= 2018 Rio de Janeiro gubernatorial election =

Brazilian state election

2018 Rio de Janeiro state election
- 7 October 2018 (first round); 28 October 2018 (second round)
- Gubernatorial election
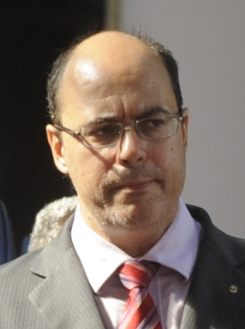

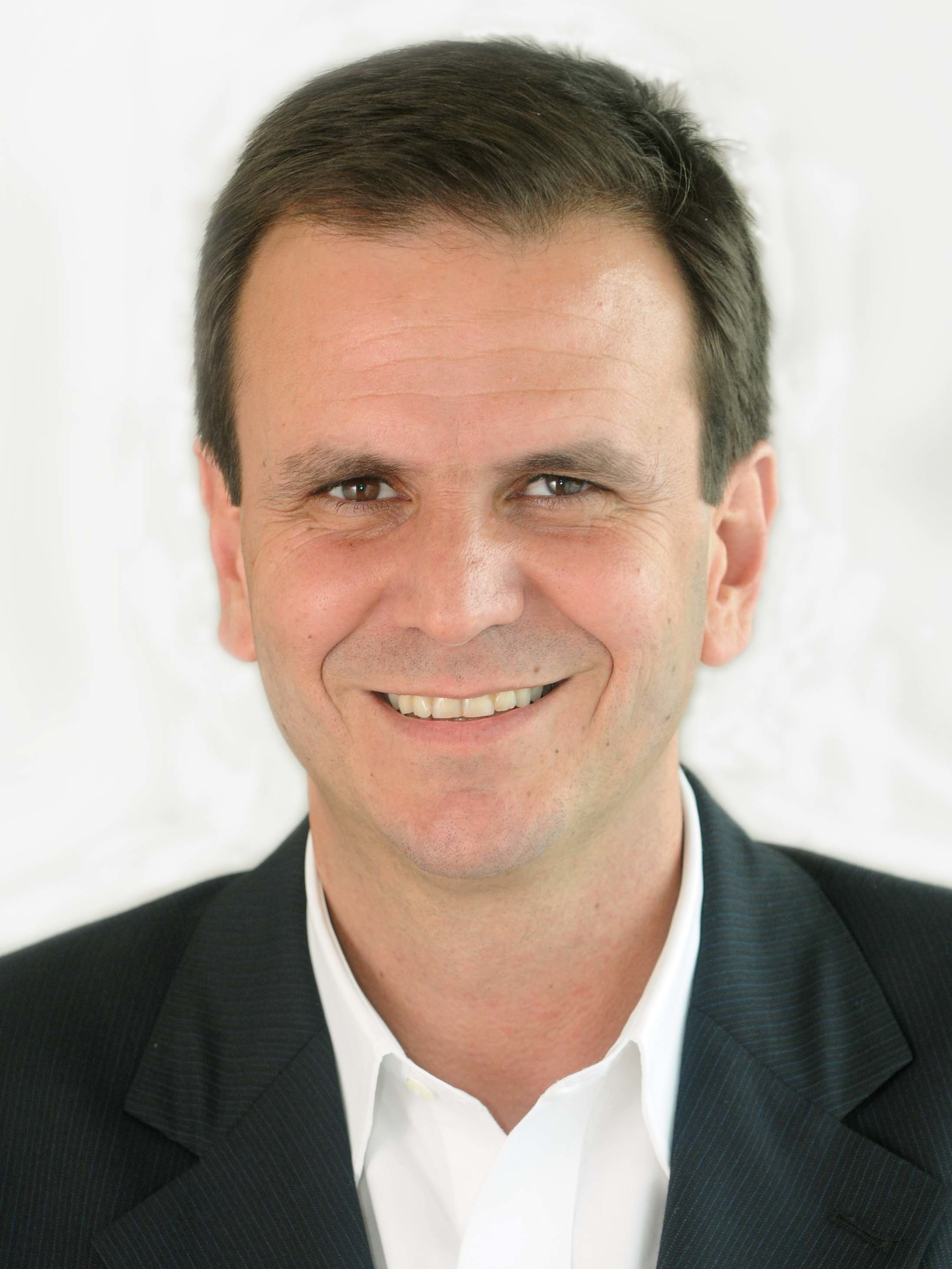
Nominee	Wilson Witzel	Eduardo Paes
Party	PSC	DEM
Alliance	More Order, More Progress	Strength of Rio
Running mate	Cláudio Castro	Comte Bittencourt
Popular vote	4,675,355	3,134,400
Percentage	59.87%	40.13%
- Candidate with the most votes per municipality in the 2nd round (92): Wilson Witzel (89); Eduardo Paes (3)
Governor before election
Francisco Dornelles (acting)
PP
Elected Governor
Wilson Witzel
PSC
- Parliamentary election
Party	Leader	Vote %	Seats	+/–
Legislative Assembly
PSL	Flávio Bolsonaro	15.62%	13	+11
DEM	Filipe Soares	7.09%	6	+6
MDB	Rafael Picciani	6.68%	5	−10
PSD	Jorge Felippe Neto	4.69%	3	−5
PT	Gilberto Palmares	4.53%	3	−3
Republicanos	Jucélia Freitas	4.33%	3	+1
PP	Dionisio Lins	3,14%	2	−2
PRP	Bruno Dauaire	2.80	2	+2
PHS	Marcos Muller	2.74%	2	+1
PSC	Márcio Pacheco	2.44%	2	+1
This lists parties that won seats. See the complete results below.

2018 Rio de Janeiro Senate election
- 7 October 2018
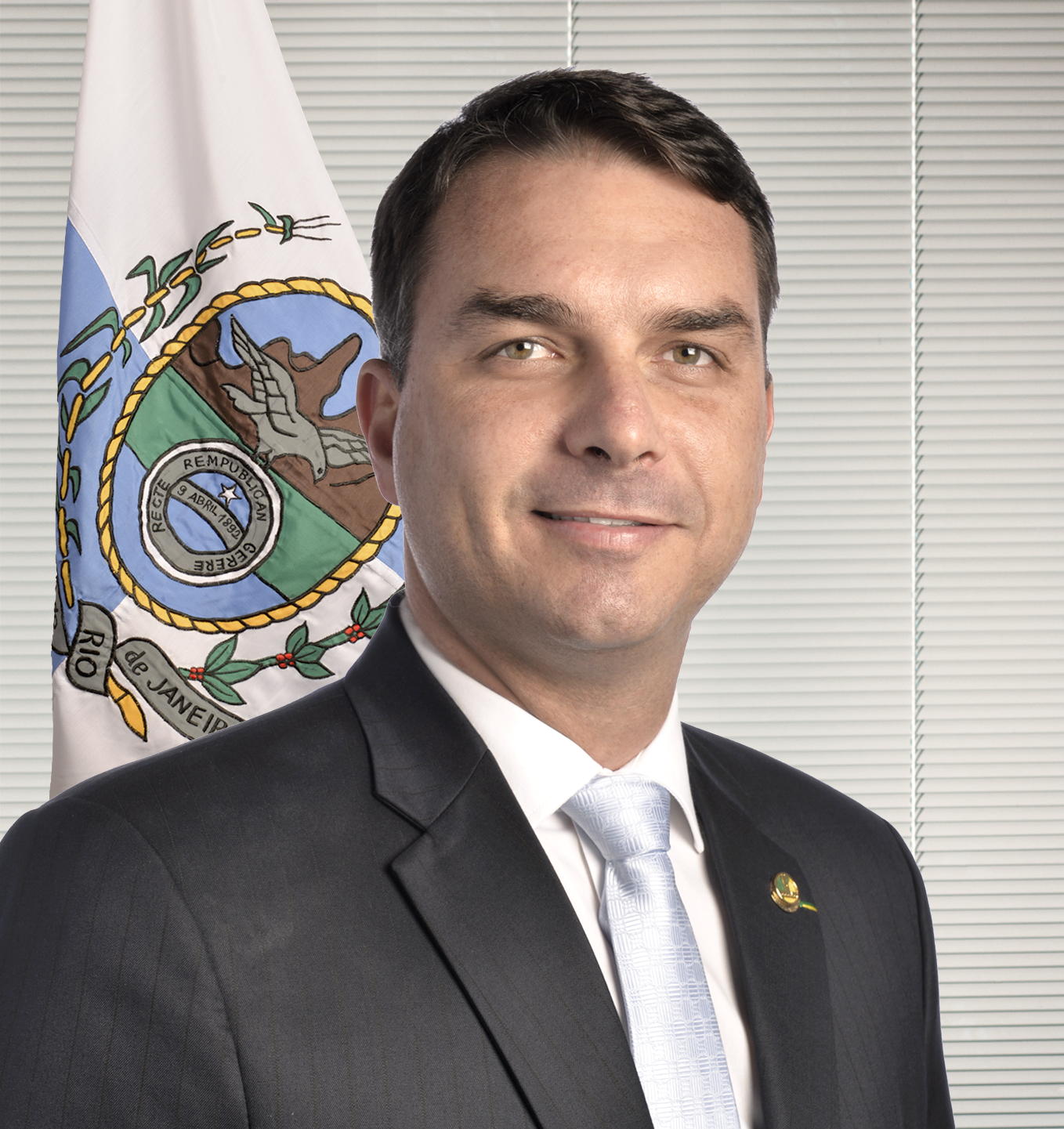

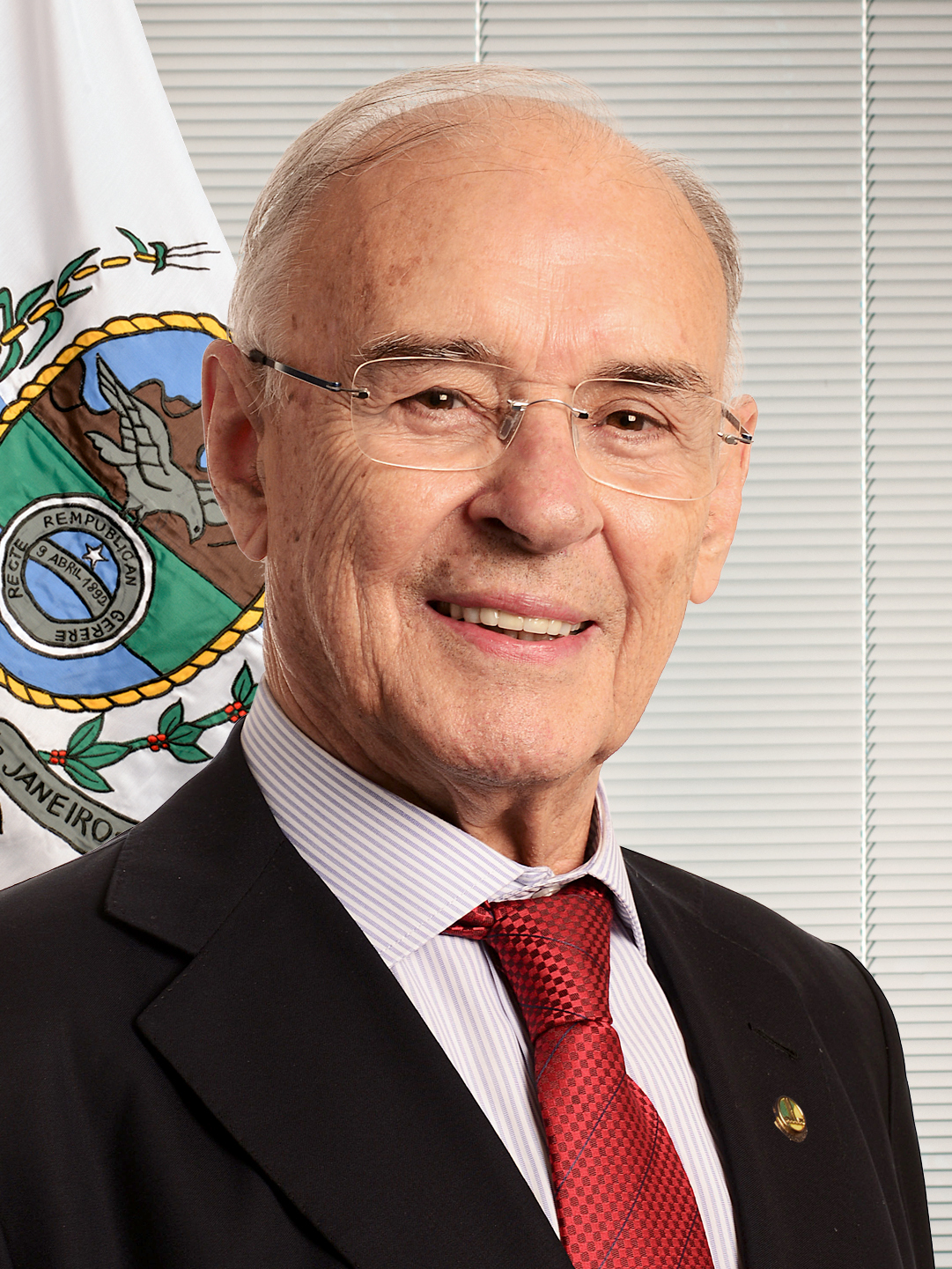

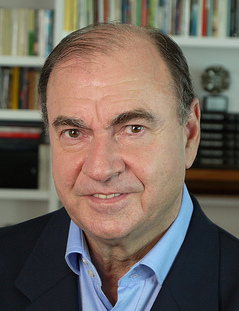
Candidate	Flávio Bolsonaro	Arolde de Oliveira	Cesar Maia
Party	PSL	PSD	DEM
Popular vote	4,380,418	2,382,265	2,327,634
Percentage	31.36%	17.06%	16.67%
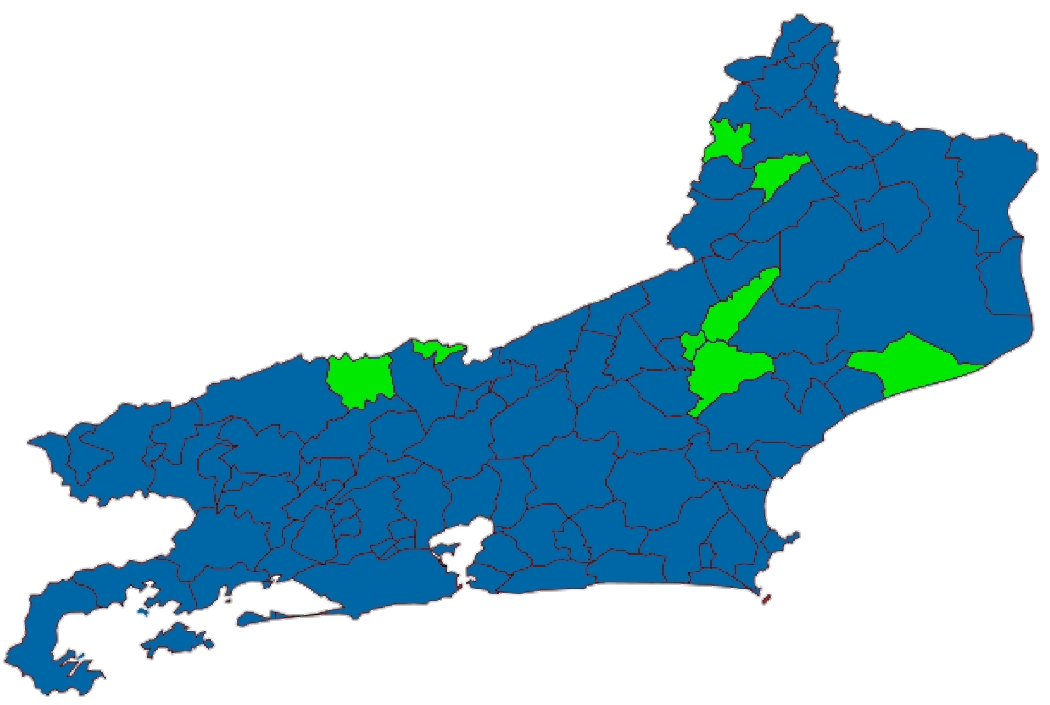
- Candidate with the most votes per municipality in the 1st round (92): Flávio Bolsonaro (84); César Maia (8)
Senators before election
Lindbergh Farias and Eduardo Lopes
PT and PRB
Elected Senators
Arolde de Oliveira and Flávio Bolsonaro
PSD and PSL

The Rio de Janeiro gubernatorial election of October 2018 was for the election of the Governor and Vice Governor of Rio de Janeiro and 70 State Deputies. People also voted for 2 of 3 Senators of the state representation in the Federal legislative power, with 45 federal deputies representatives of the Rio de Janeiro State. A second round was held after no candidate managed to secure more than 50% of the Governor votes.

The previous gubernatorial election in the state was held in October 2014. Supported by the Brazilian Democratic Movement, Luiz Fernando Pezão was re-elected in second round with 55.78% of the votes, against 44.22% of Marcelo Crivella.

In the second round runoff, Wilson Witzel was elected Governor of Rio de Janeiro.

== Gubernatorial candidates ==
=== Candidates in runoff ===
Party	Candidate	Most relevant political office or occupation	Party	Running mate	Coalition	Electoral number
Social Christian Party (PSC)	Wilson Witzel	Federal judge of the 2nd Region (2001–2018)	Social Christian Party (PSC)	Cláudio Castro	More Order, More Progress: Social Christian Party (PSC); Republican Party of the Social Order (PROS)	20
Democrats (DEM)	Eduardo Paes	Mayor of Rio de Janeiro (2009–2017)	Popular Socialist Party (PPS)	Comte Bittencourt	Strength of Rio: Democrats (DEM); Popular Socialist Party (PPS); Brazilian Social Democracy Party (PSDB); Progressistas (PP); Brazilian Labour Party (PTB); Brazilian Democratic Movement (MDB); Solidariedade; Green Party (PV); Christian Democracy (DC); Humanist Party of Solidarity (PHS); Avante; Party of National Mobilization (PMN)	25

=== Candidates failing to make runoff ===
Party	Candidate	Most relevant political office or occupation	Party	Running mate	Coalition	Electoral number
Democratic Labour Party (PDT)	Pedro Fernandes Neto	Member of the Legislative Assembly of Rio de Janeiro (2007–2019)	Brazilian Socialist Party (PSB)	Gláucio Julianelli	Renew to Change: Democratic Labour Party (PDT); Brazilian Socialist Party (PSB)	12
Workers' Party (PT)	Marcia Tiburi	Philosopher, plastic artist, university professor and writer	Communist Party of Brazil (PCdoB)	Leonardo Giordano	Popular Front: Workers' Party (PT); Communist Party of Brazil (PCdoB)	13
United Socialist Workers' Party (PSTU)	Dayse Oliveira	Teacher and political militant	United Socialist Workers' Party (PSTU)	Pedro Villas-Bôas	—N/a	16
Podemos (PODE)	Romário Faria	Senator for Rio de Janeiro (2015–present)	Party of the Republic (PR)	Marcelo Delaroli	The Strength that Comes from the People: Podemos (PODE); Party of the Republic (PR); Sustainability Network (REDE); Free Fatherland Party (PPL)	19
Brazilian Labour Renewal Party (PRTB)	André Monteiro	Warrant Officer of the Military Police of Rio de Janeiro State	Brazilian Labour Renewal Party (PRTB)	Jonas Licurgo	—N/a	28
New Party (NOVO)	Marcelo Trindade	Lawyer and professor	New Party (NOVO)	Carmen Migueles	—N/a	30
Socialism and Liberty Party (PSOL)	Tarcísio Motta	Member of the Municipal Chamber of Rio de Janeiro (2017–2023)	Socialism and Liberty Party (PSOL)	Ivanete Silva	Change is Possible: Socialism and Liberty Party (PSOL); Brazilian Communist Party (PCB)	50
Social Democratic Party (PSD)	Indio da Costa	Member of the Chamber of Deputies (2015–2019)	Social Democratic Party (PSD)	Zaqueu Teixeira	—N/a	55

=== Candidacies denied ===
Party	Candidate	Most relevant political office or occupation	Party	Running mate	Coalition	Electoral number
Workers' Cause Party (PCO)	Luiz Eugênio	Metal worker	Workers' Cause Party (PCO)	Joaquim Nogueira	—N/a	29
Progressive Republican Party (PRP)	Anthony Garotinho	Member of the Chamber of Deputies (2011–2015)	Brazilian Republican Party (PRB)	Leide Duarte	For the People to be Happy Again: Progressive Republican Party (PRP); Brazilian Republican Party (PRB); Christian Labour Party (PTC); Patriota (PATRI)	44

=== Declined candidates ===
- Paulo Hartung (MDB) - Governor of Espírito Santo 2003–2011 and since 2015; Senator for Espírito Santo 1999–2002; Mayor of Vitória 1993–1997; Federal Deputy from Espírito Santo 1987–1991; State Deputy of Espírito Santo 1983–1987.
- Marcelo Crivella (PRB) - Mayor of Rio de Janeiro since 2017; Minister of Fishing and Aquaculture 2012–2014; Senator for Rio de Janeiro 2003–2016. Candidate for Governor of Rio de Janeiro in 2006 and 2014.
- Sérgio Besserman Vianna - President of IBGE 1999–2003.
- Omar Peres (PDT) - businessman. Candidate for Mayor of Juiz de Fora in 2008.
- Rodrigo Neves (PDT) - Mayor of Niterói since 2013; State Deputy of Rio de Janeiro 2007–2013; City Councillor of Niterói 1997–2007.
- Cesar Maia (DEM) - City Councillor of Rio de Janeiro since 2013; Mayor of Rio de Janeiro 1993–1997, 2001–2009; Federal Deputy from Rio de Janeiro 1987–1992. Candidate for Senator in 2010 and 2014.
- Bernardo Rezende (NOVO) - Brazil men's national volleyball team coach 2001–2017.
- Eduardo Bandeira de Mello - President of Flamengo Rowing Club since 2013.
- Celso Amorim (PT) - Minister of Defence 2011–2015; Minister of Foreign Affairs 1993–1995, 2003–2011.
- Miro Teixeira (REDE) - Federal Deputy from Rio de Janeiro since 1987, 1971–1983; Minister of Communications 2003–2004.
- Chico Alencar (PSOL) - Federal Deputy from Rio de Janeiro.
- Vinícius Farah (MDB) - Mayor of Três Rios 2009–2017; Vice Mayor of Três Rios 2005–2009.
- Rubem Cesar Fernandes (PPS) - Director of Viva Rio.
- Mendelssohn Kieling (PMB) - Prosecutor of justice.
- Leonardo Giordano (PCdoB) - City Councillor of Niterói since 2009.
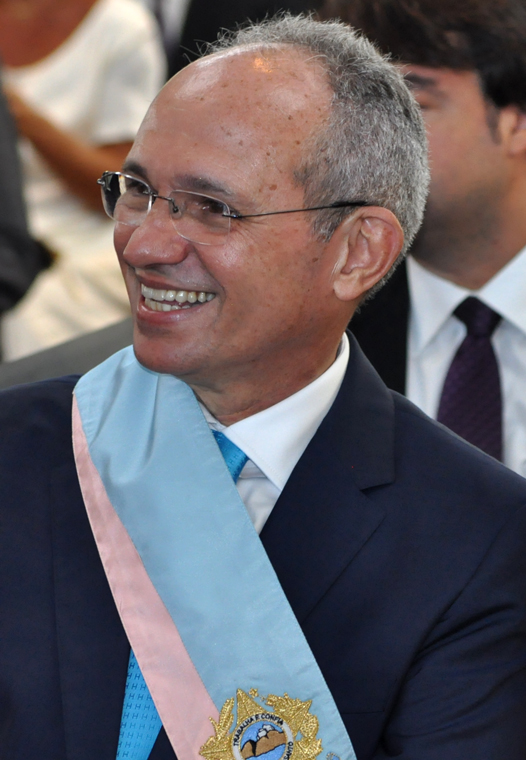
Governor of Espírito Santo
Paulo Hartung (MDB)
from Guaçuí

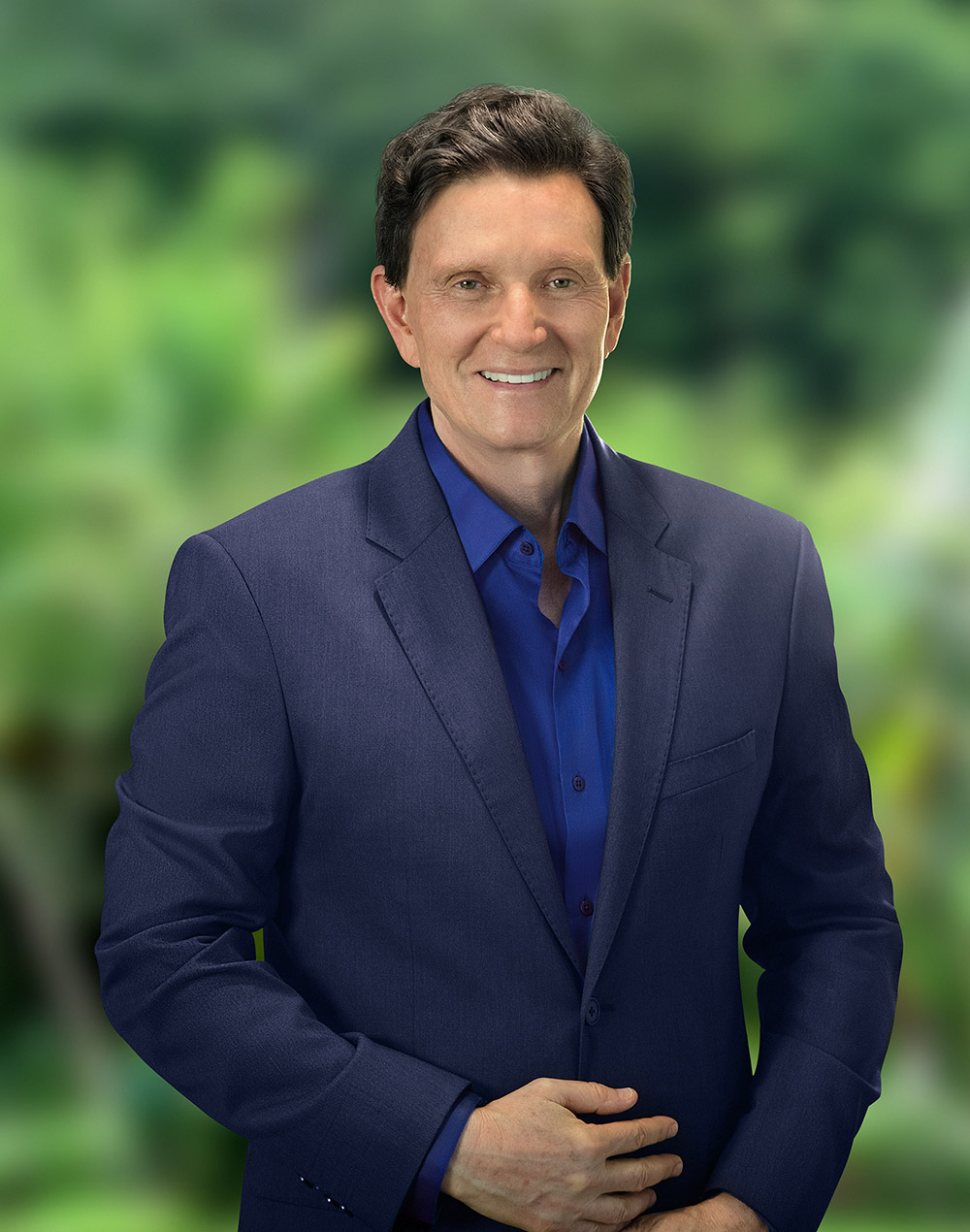
Mayor of Rio de Janeiro
Marcelo Crivella (PRB)
from Rio de Janeiro

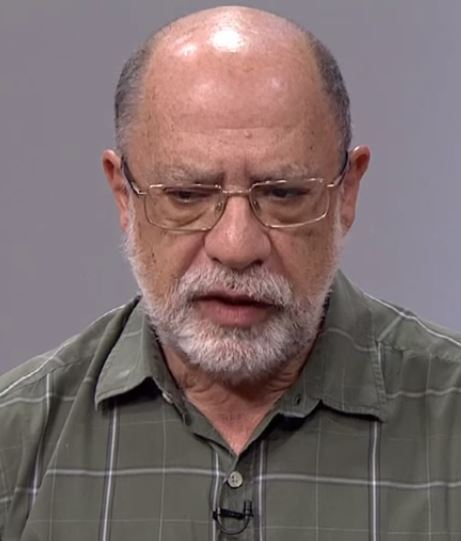
Former President of IBGE
Sérgio Besserman Vianna
from Rio de Janeiro

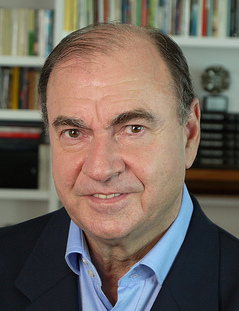
City Councillor of Rio de Janeiro
Cesar Maia (DEM)
from Rio de Janeiro

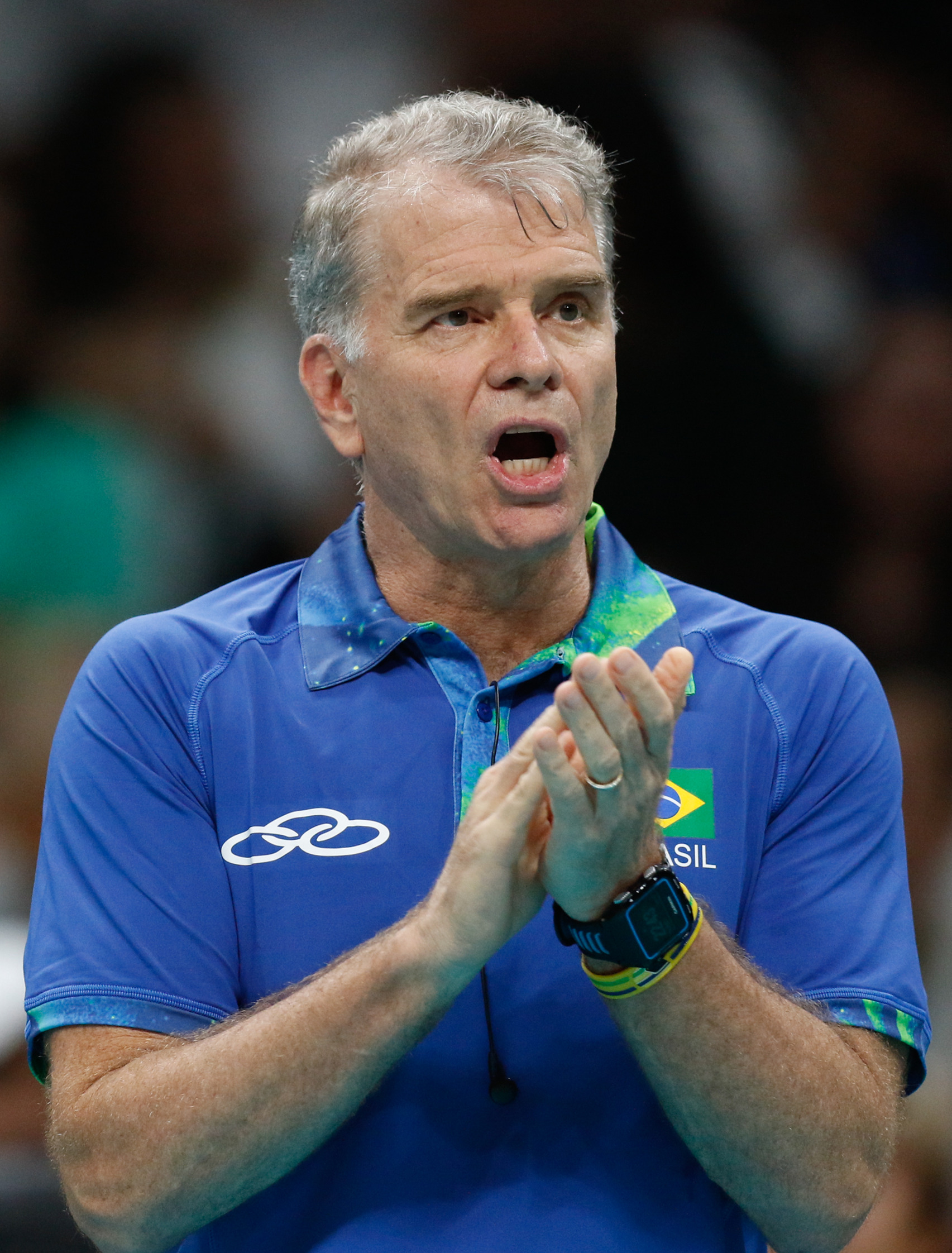
Former Brazil's volleyball team coach
Bernardo Rezende (NOVO)
from Rio de Janeiro

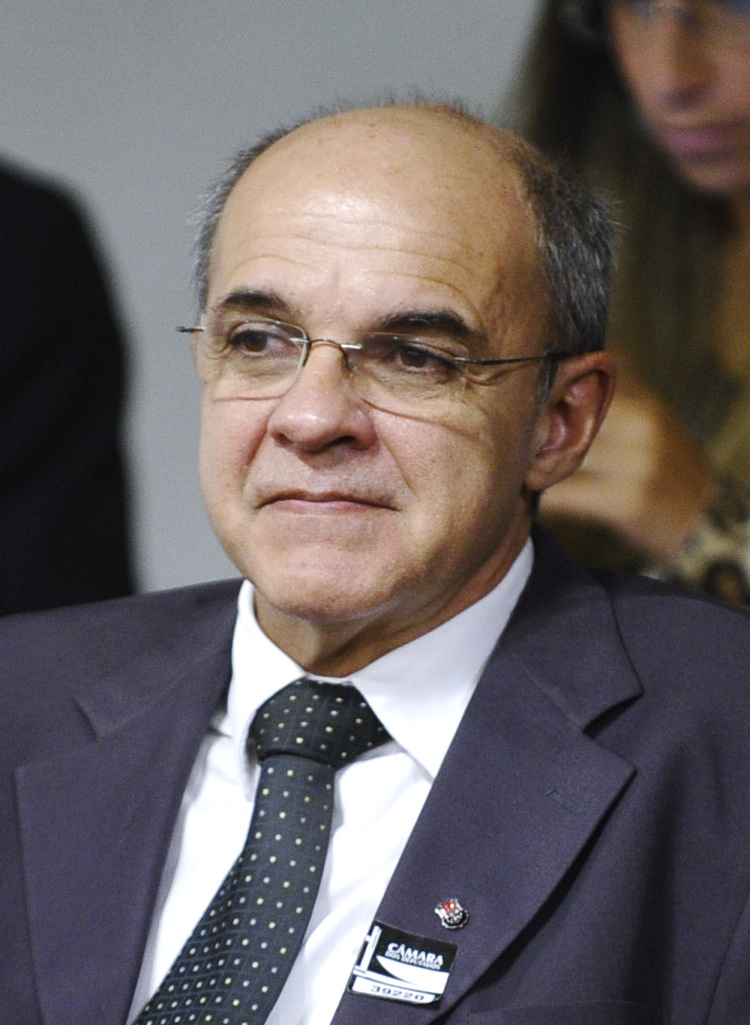
President of Flamengo
Eduardo Bandeira de Mello
from Rio de Janeiro

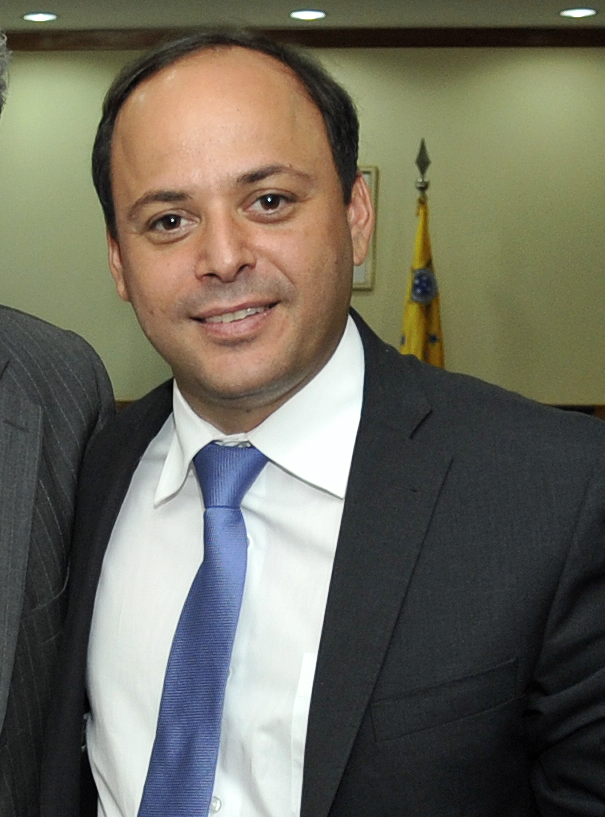
Mayor of Niterói
Rodrigo Neves (PDT)
from São Gonçalo

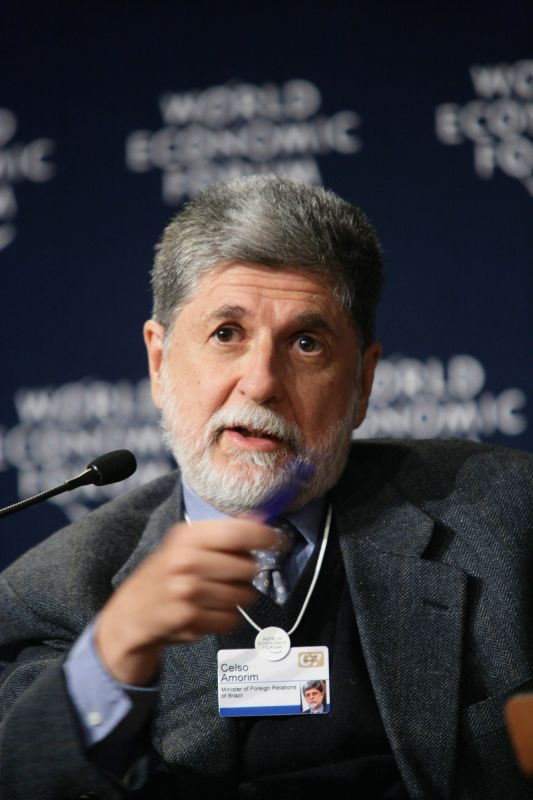
Former Minister of Defence
Celso Amorim (PT)
from Santos

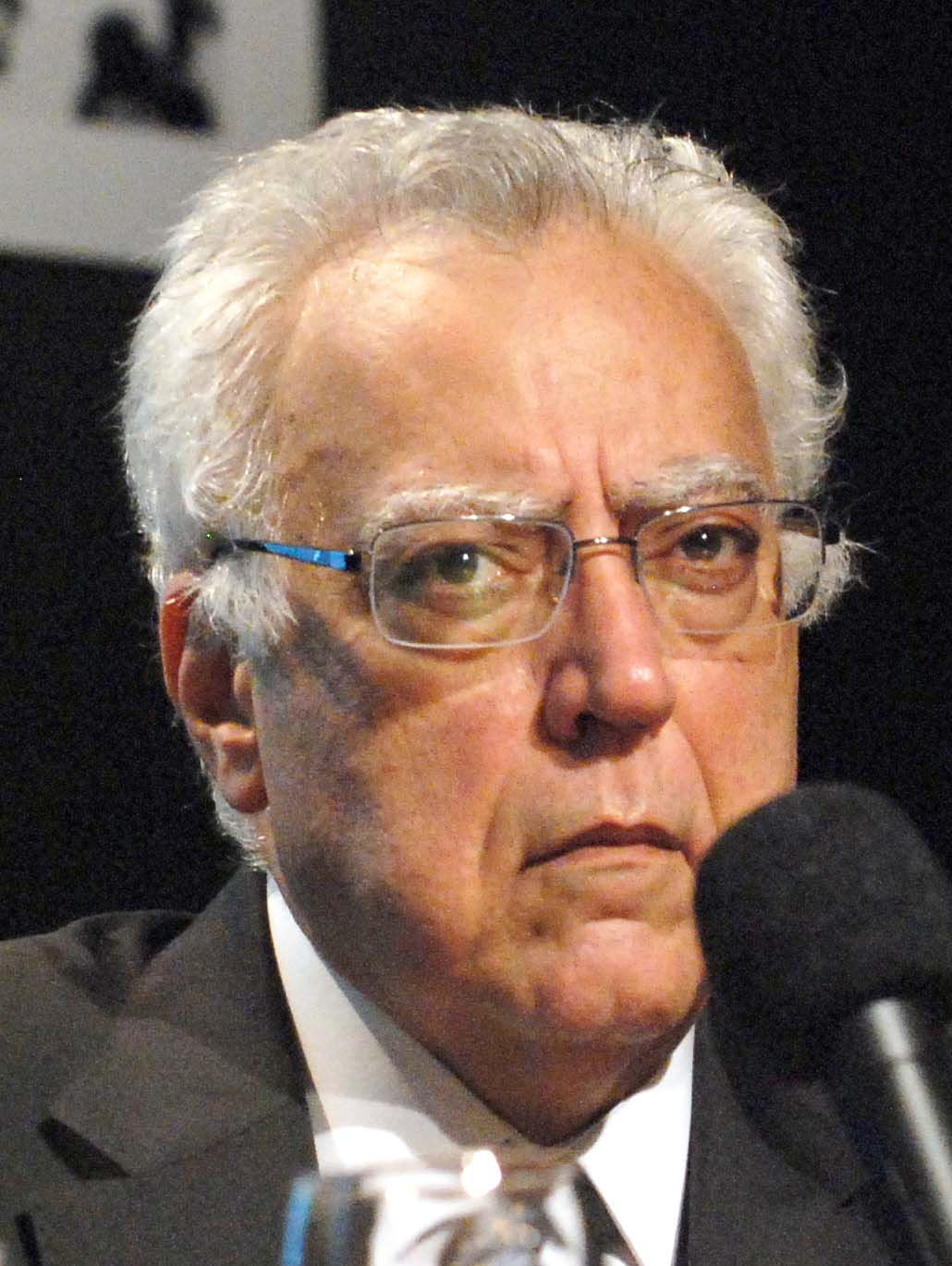
Federal Deputy
Miro Teixeira (REDE)
from Rio de Janeiro

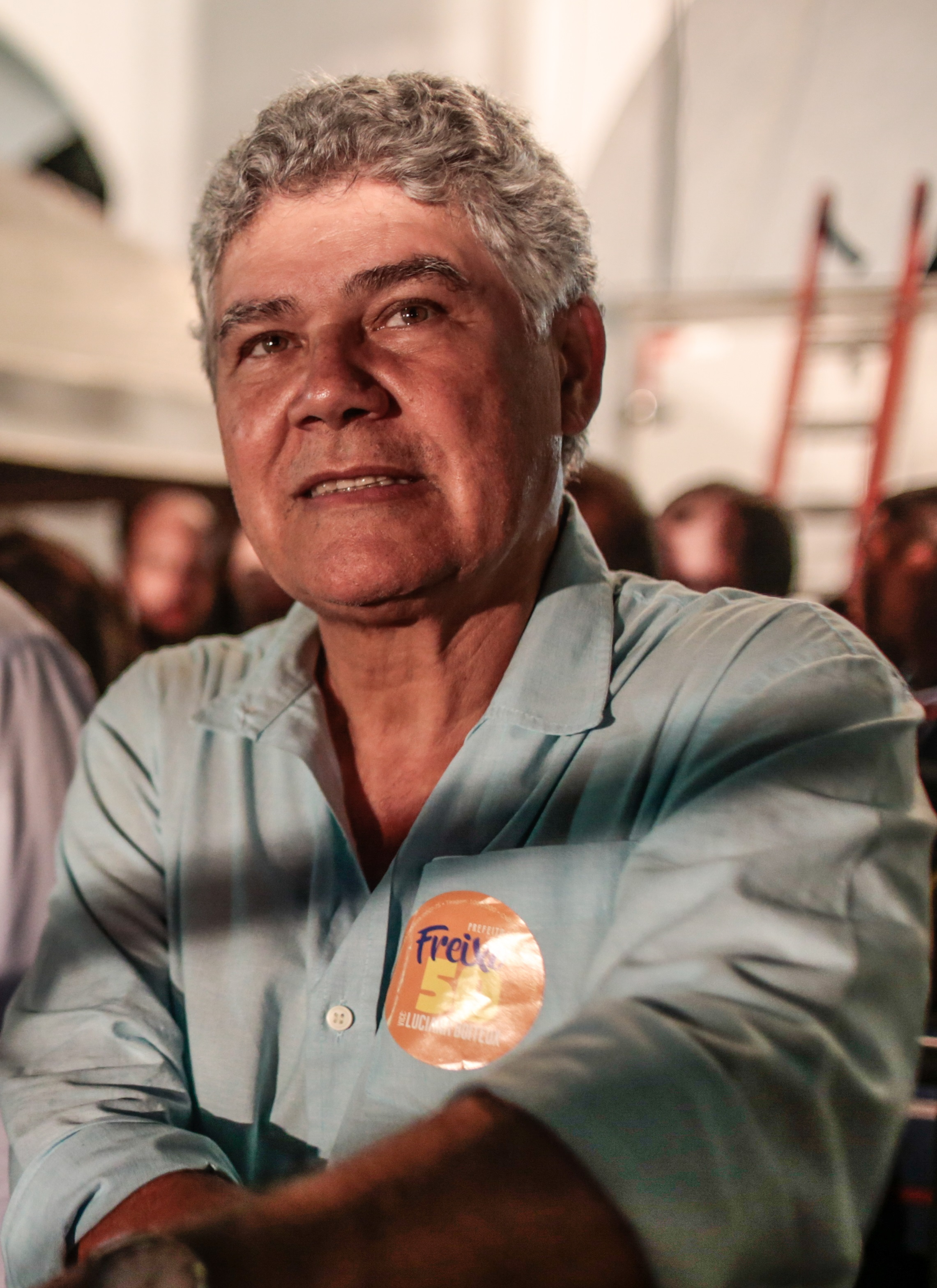
Federal Deputy
Chico Alencar (PSOL)
from Rio de Janeiro

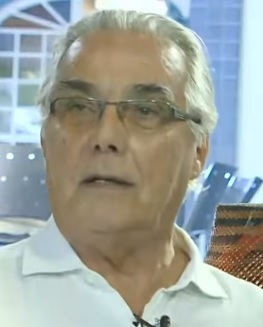
Director of the Viva Rio
Rubem Cesar (PPS)
from Rio de Janeiro

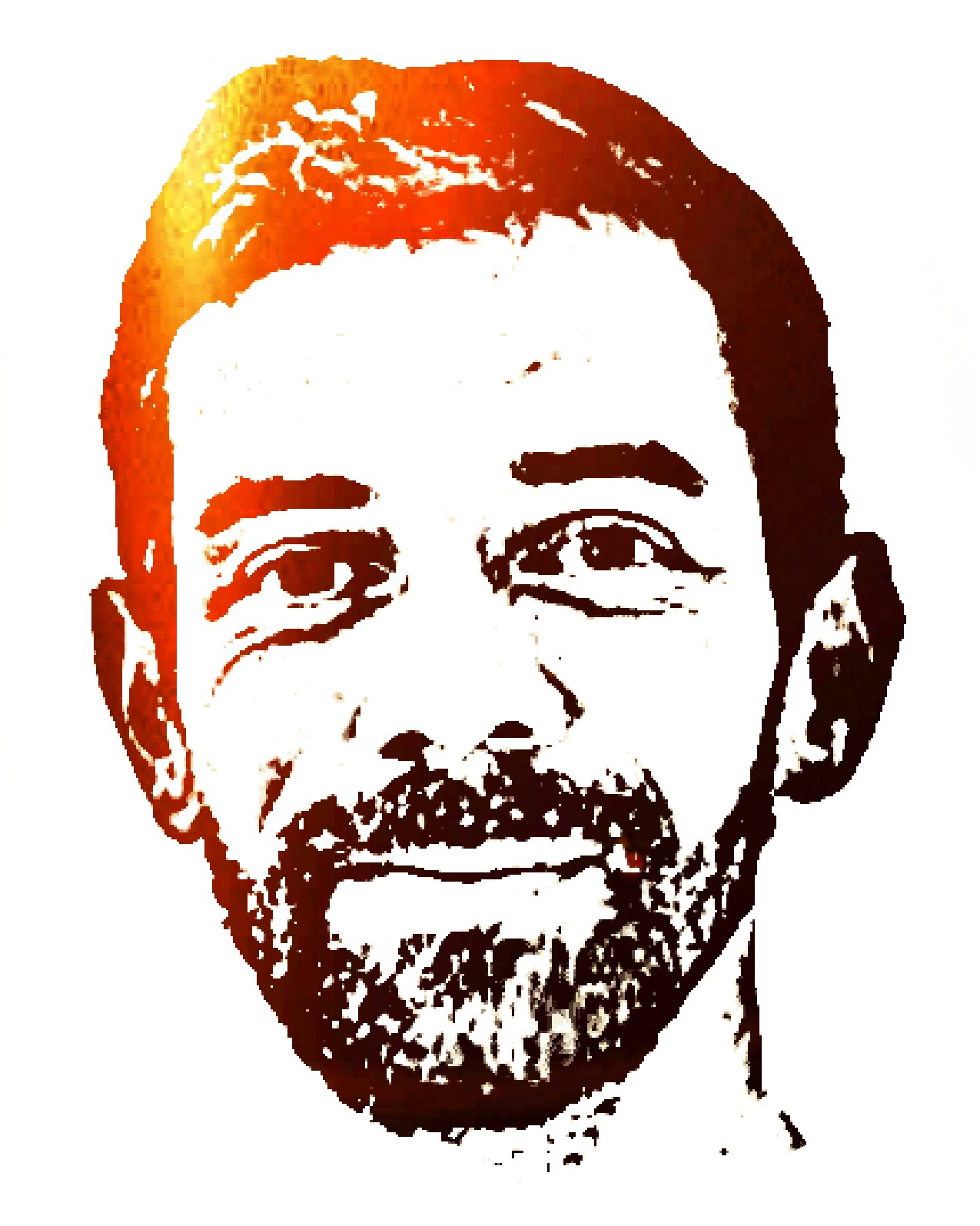
City Councillor of Niterói
Leonardo Giordano (PCdoB)
from Niterói

== Debates ==
=== Governor ===
2018 Rio de Janeiro gubernatorial election debates
No.	Date	Hosts	Moderators	Participants							
Key: P Present A Absent N Not invited Out Out of the election				PSC	DEM	PSOL	PODE	PDT	PSD	PT	PRP
Key: P Present A Absent N Not invited Out Out of the election				Witzel	Paes	Motta	Romário	Fernandes	Indio	Tiburi	Garotinho
1.1	Thursday, 16 August 2018	Rede Bandeirantes	Rodolfo Schneider	P	P	P	P	P	P	P	P
1.2	Tuesday, 28 August 2018	O Globo, Jornal Extra, Época, Estácio	Ancelmo Gois, Berenice Seara	N	P	P	A	N	P	N	P
1.3	Wednesday, 19 September 2018	SBT, Folha, UOL	Isabele Benito	P	P	P	P	P	P	P	P
1.4	Friday, 28 September 2018	RecordTV, R7	Janine Borba	P	P	P	P	P	P	P	Out
1.5	Tuesday, 2 October 2018	Rede Globo, G1	Ana Paula Araújo	P	P	P	P	P	P	P	Out
2.1	Wednesday, 17 October 2018	O Globo, Jornal Extra, Época	Berenice Seara	P	P	Out					
2.2	Thursday, 18 October 2018	Rede Bandeirantes	Rodolfo Schneider	P	P	Out					
2.3	Friday, 19 October 2018	RecordTV, R7	Janine Borba	P	P	Out					
2.4	Monday, 22 October 2022	CBN, G1	Bianca Santos	P	P	Out					
2.5	Tuesday, 23 October 2022	SBT, Folha, UOL, Super Rádio Tupi	Isabele Benito	P	P	Out					
2.6	Thursday, 25 October 2018	Rede Globo, G1	Ana Paula Araújo	P	P	Out					

== Opinion polls ==
=== Governor ===
==== First round ====
Pollster/client(s)	Date(s) conducted	Sample size	Paes DEM	Romário PODE	Garotinho PRP/PR	Motta PSOL	Indio PSD	Fernandes PDT	Witzel PSC	Pezão PMDB	Crivella PRB	Others	Abst. Undec.	Lead
2018 election	7 Oct	–	19.56%	8.70%	–	10.72%	5.95%	6.11%	41.28%	–	–	7.68%	19.34%	21.72%
Datafolha	5–6 Oct	2,667	23%	15%	–	10%	11%	5%	14%	–	–	5%	14%	8%
Ibope	4–6 Oct	2,002	26%	17%	–	7%	10%	5%	10%	–	–	8%	17%	9%
Datafolha	3–4 Oct	1,484	24%	16%	–	9%	10%	6%	10%	–	–	8%	18%	8%
Ibope	30 Sep–2 Oct	2,002	26%	19%	–	6%	10%	3%	7%	–	–	10%	20%	7%
27 Sep		The Superior Electoral Court bans Anthony Garotinho from running in the 2018 elections												
Datafolha	26–28 Sep	1,414	25%	14%	15%	6%	8%	2%	4%	–	–	6%	19%	10%
Ibope	22–24 Sep	1,512	24%	16%	16%	4%	6%	2%	4%	–	–	7%	22%	8%
Datafolha	18–19 Sep	1,358	22%	14%	12%	6%	7%	2%	4%	–	–	5%	27%	8%
Ibope	4–10 Sep	1,204	23%	20%	12%	5%	4%	2%	1%	–	–	5%	29%	3%
Datafolha	4–6 Sep	1,357	24%	14%	10%	7%	5%	3%	1%	–	–	5%	30%	10%
Datafolha	20–21 Aug	1,322	18%	16%	12%	5%	5%	3%	1%	–	–	7%	33%	2%
Ibope	17–20 Aug	1,204	12%	14%	12%	5%	3%	2%	1%	–	–	5%	46%	2%
2014 election	5 Oct 2014	–	–	–	19.73%	8.92%	–	–	–	40.57%	20.26%	10.53%	17.56%	20.31%

==== Second round ====
Pollster/client(s)	Date(s) conducted	Sample size	Witzel PSC	Paes DEM	Pezão PMDB	Crivella PRB	Abst. Undec.	Lead
2018 election	28 Oct	–	59.87%	40.13%	–	–	17.06%	19.74%
Datafolha	26–27 Oct	3,008	44%	40%	–	–	16%	4%
Ibope	25–27 Oct	2,002	45%	38%	–	–	17%	7%
Datafolha	24–25 Oct	1,481	47%	37%	–	–	17%	10%
Ibope	20–23 Oct	1,512	48%	38%	–	–	14%	10%
Datafolha	17–18 Oct	1,484	50%	33%	–	–	17%	17%
Ibope	15–17 Oct	1,512	51%	34%	–	–	14%	17%
2014 election	26 Oct	–	–	–	55.78%	44.22%	17.5%	11.56%

=== Senator ===
Pollster/client(s)	Date(s) conducted	Sample size	Maia DEM	Farias PT	Bolsonaro PSL	Alencar PSOL	Teixeira REDE	Pereira PSC	Oliveira PSD	Lopes PRB	Crivella PRB	Picciani PMDB	Others	Abst. Undec. (1st seat)	Abst. Undec. (2nd seat)	Lead
2018 election	7 Oct	–	16.67%	10.17%	31.36%	9.17%	3.09%	2.58%	17.06%	3.64%	–	–	6.27%	26.29%		14.30%
Datafolha	3–4 Oct	1,542	29%	20%	30%	15%	11%	7%	11%	3%	–	–	18%	21%	34%	1%
Ibope	30 Sep–2 Oct	2,002	27%	22%	26%	11%	10%	7%	9%	4%	–	–	22%	16%	25%	1%
Datafolha	26–28 Sep	1,414	26%	22%	25%	14%	11%	6%	9%	4%	–	–	18%	24%	40%	1%
Ibope	22–24 Sep	1,512	27%	19%	22%	11%	10%	8%	7%	3%	–	–	20%	18%	26%	5%
Datafolha	18–19 Sep	1,358	24%	21%	26%	12%	11%	7%	8%	4%	–	–	19%	46%	26%	2%
Ibope	7–9 Sep	1,204	22%	15%	19%	11%	9%	7%	4%	–	–	–	18%	27%	37%	3%
Paraná Pesquisas	25–30 Aug	1,860	15.7%	14.1%	19.7%	11.3%	8.5%	6.3%	6.5%	4.1%	–	–	11.4%	34.2%		4%
RealTime Big Data	10–12 Aug	2,000	15%	10%	24%	14%	5%	2%	4%	7%	–	–	5%	12%		9%
2010 election	3 Oct	–	11.06%	28.65%	–	–	–	–	–	–	22.66%	20.73%	16.91%	23.18%		5.99%

== Senate elections ==
=== Confirmed candidates ===
Party	Candidate	Most relevant political office or occupation	Party	Candidates for Alternate Senators	Coalition	Electoral number
Brazilian Republican Party (PRB)	Eduardo Lopes	Senator for Rio de Janeiro (2017–2019)	Brazilian Republican Party (PRB)	1st alternate senator: Jane Crivella	For the People to be Happy Again: Progressive Republican Party (PRP); Brazilian Republican Party (PRB); Christian Labour Party (PTC); Patriota (PATRI)	100
Brazilian Republican Party (PRB)	Eduardo Lopes	Senator for Rio de Janeiro (2017–2019)	Christian Labour Party (PTC)	2nd alternate senator: Luiz Guedes Junior	For the People to be Happy Again: Progressive Republican Party (PRP); Brazilian Republican Party (PRB); Christian Labour Party (PTC); Patriota (PATRI)	100
Patriota (PATRI)	Walter Cristie	Theology, pastor and entrepreneur	Progressive Republican Party (PRP)	1st alternate senator: Carla Jordes	For the People to be Happy Again: Progressive Republican Party (PRP); Brazilian Republican Party (PRB); Christian Labour Party (PTC); Patriota (PATRI)	511
Patriota (PATRI)	Walter Cristie	Theology, pastor and entrepreneur	Progressive Republican Party (PRP)	2nd alternate senator: Mauro Cunha	For the People to be Happy Again: Progressive Republican Party (PRP); Brazilian Republican Party (PRB); Christian Labour Party (PTC); Patriota (PATRI)	511
Democratic Labour Party (PDT)	José Bonifácio		Democratic Labour Party (PDT)	1st alternate senator: Maria José Lagte	Renew to Change: Democratic Labour Party (PDT); Brazilian Socialist Party (PSB)	123
Democratic Labour Party (PDT)	José Bonifácio		Democratic Labour Party (PDT)	2nd alternate senator: Alice Alves	Renew to Change: Democratic Labour Party (PDT); Brazilian Socialist Party (PSB)	123
Workers' Party (PT)	Lindbergh Farias	Senator for Rio de Janeiro (2011–2019)	Workers' Party (PT)	1st alternate senator: Edinho Silva	Popular Front: Workers' Party (PT); Communist Party of Brazil (PCdoB)	131
Workers' Party (PT)	Lindbergh Farias	Senator for Rio de Janeiro (2011–2019)	Workers' Party (PT)	2nd alternate senator: Anazir Oliveira	Popular Front: Workers' Party (PT); Communist Party of Brazil (PCdoB)	131
United Socialist Workers' Party (PSTU)	Samantha Guedes	Political militant	United Socialist Workers' Party (PSTU)	1st alternate senator: Juzerley Assunção	—N/a	160
United Socialist Workers' Party (PSTU)	Samantha Guedes	Political militant	United Socialist Workers' Party (PSTU)	2nd alternate senator: Maria Elisa Guimarães	—N/a	160
United Socialist Workers' Party (PSTU)	Cyro Garcia	Member of the Chamber of Deputies (1992–1993)	United Socialist Workers' Party (PSTU)	1st alternate senator: Julia Eberhardt	—N/a	161
United Socialist Workers' Party (PSTU)	Cyro Garcia	Member of the Chamber of Deputies (1992–1993)	United Socialist Workers' Party (PSTU)	2nd alternate senator: Sérgio Perdigão	—N/a	161
Social Liberal Party (PSL)	Flávio Bolsonaro	Member of the Legislative Assembly of Rio de Janeiro (2003–2019)	Social Liberal Party (PSL)	1st alternate senator: Paulo Marinho	—N/a	177
Social Liberal Party (PSL)	Flávio Bolsonaro	Member of the Legislative Assembly of Rio de Janeiro (2003–2019)	Social Liberal Party (PSL)	2nd alternate senator: Leonardo Rodrigues	—N/a	177
Sustainability Network (REDE)	Miro Teixeira	Member of the Chamber of Deputies (1987–)	Sustainability Network (REDE)	1st alternate senator: Sônia Rabello	The Strength that Comes from the People: Podemos (PODE); Party of the Republic (PR); Sustainability Network (REDE); Free Fatherland Party (PPL)	188
Sustainability Network (REDE)	Miro Teixeira	Member of the Chamber of Deputies (1987–)	Sustainability Network (REDE)	2nd alternate senator: Valéria Tatsch	The Strength that Comes from the People: Podemos (PODE); Party of the Republic (PR); Sustainability Network (REDE); Free Fatherland Party (PPL)	188
Social Christian Party (PSC)	Everaldo Pereira	PSC National President (2015–2023)	Social Christian Party (PSC)	1st alternate senator: Donizete Pereira	More Order, More Progress: Social Christian Party (PSC); Republican Party of the Social Order (PROS)	200
Social Christian Party (PSC)	Everaldo Pereira	PSC National President (2015–2023)	Social Christian Party (PSC)	2nd alternate senator: Laercio de Almeida	More Order, More Progress: Social Christian Party (PSC); Republican Party of the Social Order (PROS)	200
Brazilian Communist Party (PCB)		Founder of Classist Unity and member of PCB women's wing	Brazilian Communist Party (PCB)	1st alternate senator: Valmiria Guida	Change is Possible: Socialism and Liberty Party (PSOL); Brazilian Communist Party (PCB)	211
Brazilian Communist Party (PCB)		Founder of Classist Unity and member of PCB women's wing	Brazilian Communist Party (PCB)	2nd alternate senator: Ricardo Pinheiro	Change is Possible: Socialism and Liberty Party (PSOL); Brazilian Communist Party (PCB)	211
Socialism and Liberty Party (PSOL)	Chico Alencar	Member of the Chamber of Deputies (2003–2019)	Socialism and Liberty Party (PSOL)	1st alternate senator: Vanderleia Aguiar	Change is Possible: Socialism and Liberty Party (PSOL); Brazilian Communist Party (PCB)	500
Socialism and Liberty Party (PSOL)	Chico Alencar	Member of the Chamber of Deputies (2003–2019)	Socialism and Liberty Party (PSOL)	2nd alternate senator: Dodora Mota	Change is Possible: Socialism and Liberty Party (PSOL); Brazilian Communist Party (PCB)	500
Democrats (DEM)	Cesar Maia	Member of the Municipal Chamber of Rio de Janeiro (2013–present)	Democrats (DEM)	1st alternate senator: Sergio Zveiter	Strength of Rio: Democrats (DEM); Popular Socialist Party (PPS); Brazilian Social Democracy Party (PSDB); Progressistas (PP); Brazilian Labour Party (PTB); Brazilian Democratic Movement (MDB); Solidariedade; Green Party (PV); Christian Democracy (DC); Humanist Party of Solidarity (PHS); Avante; Party of National Mobilization (PMN)	255
Democrats (DEM)	Cesar Maia	Member of the Municipal Chamber of Rio de Janeiro (2013–present)	Progressistas (PP)	2nd alternate senator: Alice Tamborindeguy	Strength of Rio: Democrats (DEM); Popular Socialist Party (PPS); Brazilian Social Democracy Party (PSDB); Progressistas (PP); Brazilian Labour Party (PTB); Brazilian Democratic Movement (MDB); Solidariedade; Green Party (PV); Christian Democracy (DC); Humanist Party of Solidarity (PHS); Avante; Party of National Mobilization (PMN)	255
Brazilian Social Democracy Party (PSDB)	Aspásia Camargo	Member of the Legislative Assembly of Rio de Janeiro (2011–2015)	Progressistas (PP)	1st alternate senator: Marco Magalhães	Strength of Rio: Democrats (DEM); Popular Socialist Party (PPS); Brazilian Social Democracy Party (PSDB); Progressistas (PP); Brazilian Labour Party (PTB); Brazilian Democratic Movement (MDB); Solidariedade; Green Party (PV); Christian Democracy (DC); Humanist Party of Solidarity (PHS); Avante; Party of National Mobilization (PMN)	455
Brazilian Social Democracy Party (PSDB)	Aspásia Camargo	Member of the Legislative Assembly of Rio de Janeiro (2011–2015)	Brazilian Labour Party (PTB)	2nd alternate senator: Jorge Rodino	Strength of Rio: Democrats (DEM); Popular Socialist Party (PPS); Brazilian Social Democracy Party (PSDB); Progressistas (PP); Brazilian Labour Party (PTB); Brazilian Democratic Movement (MDB); Solidariedade; Green Party (PV); Christian Democracy (DC); Humanist Party of Solidarity (PHS); Avante; Party of National Mobilization (PMN)	455
Brazilian Labour Renewal Party (PRTB)	Mattos Nascimento	Evangelical singer and songwriter	Brazilian Labour Renewal Party (PRTB)	1st alternate senator: Felipe Pereira	—N/a	281
Brazilian Labour Renewal Party (PRTB)	Mattos Nascimento	Evangelical singer and songwriter	Brazilian Labour Renewal Party (PRTB)	2nd alternate senator: Djamim Ferreira	—N/a	281
Brazilian Woman's Party (PMB)	Gabrielle Burcci	Entrepreneur	Brazilian Woman's Party (PMB)	1st alternate senator: Sidclei Bernardo	—N/a	355
Brazilian Woman's Party (PMB)	Gabrielle Burcci	Entrepreneur	Brazilian Woman's Party (PMB)	2nd alternate senator: Silvio Mallet	—N/a	355
Social Democratic Party (PSD)	Arolde de Oliveira	Member of the Chamber of Deputies (1984–2019)	Social Democratic Party (PSD)	1st alternate senator: Carlos Portinho	—N/a	555
Social Democratic Party (PSD)	Arolde de Oliveira	Member of the Chamber of Deputies (1984–2019)	Social Democratic Party (PSD)	2nd alternate senator: Renata Guerra	—N/a	555

=== Candidacy denied ===
Party	Candidate	Most relevant political office or occupation	Party	Candidates for Alternate Senators	Coalition	Electoral number
Workers' Cause Party (PCO)	Fernando Fagundes	University professor	Workers' Cause Party (PCO)	1st alternate senator: José Márcio Tavares	—N/a	290
Workers' Cause Party (PCO)	Fernando Fagundes	University professor	Workers' Cause Party (PCO)	2nd alternate senator: Carlos Guida	—N/a	290

== Results ==
PSC candidate Wilson Witzel secured 39 percent of the vote in the October 7. His nearest rival, DEM candidate Eduardo Paes, secured 21% of the vote. Both advanced to a second round runoff which was held on October 28. In the runoff, Witzel won the election after securing 59.87% of the vote to Paes' 40.13%

=== Governor ===
Candidate	Running mate	Party	First round		Second round	
Candidate	Running mate	Party	Votes	%	Votes	%
Wilson Witzel	Cláudio Castro	PSC	3,154,771	41.28	4,675,355	59.87
Eduardo Paes	Comte Bittencourt (PPS)	DEM	1,494,831	19.56	3,134,400	40.13
Tarcísio Motta	Ivanete Silva	PSOL	819,248	10.72		
Romário Faria	Marcelo Delaroli (PR)	PODE	664,511	8.70		
Pedro Fernandes	Gláucio Julianelli (PSB)	PDT	466,954	6.11		
Indio da Costa	Zaqueu Teixeira	PSD	454,928	5.95		
Marcia Tiburi	Leonardo Giordano (PCdoB)	PT	447,376	5.85		
Marcelo Trindade	Carmen Migueles	NOVO	86,820	1.14		
Anthony Garotinho	Leide Duarte (PRB)	PRP	84,187			
André Monteiro	Jonas Licurgo	PRTB	35,327	0.46		
Dayse Oliveira	Pedro Villas-Bôas	PSTU	17,499	0.23		
Luiz Eugênio	Joaquim Nogueira Neto	PCO	2,863			
Total			7,642,265	100.00	7,809,755	100.00
Valid votes			7,642,265	79.93	7,809,755	82.94
Invalid votes			1,379,451	14.43	1,259,983	13.38
Blank votes			539,865	5.65	346,970	3.68
Total votes			9,561,581	100.00	9,416,708	100.00
Registered voters/turnout			12,401,199	77.10	12,401,199	75.93
PSC gain from PP						

Popular vote (first round)
Witzel	41.28%
Paes	19.56%
Motta	10.72%
Romário	8.70%
Fernandes	6.11%
Indio	5.95%
Tiburi	5.85%
Others	1.83%

Popular vote (second round)
Witzel	59.87%
Paes	40.13%

=== Senator ===
Candidate	Party	Votes	%
Flávio Bolsonaro	PSL	4,380,418	31.36
Arolde de Oliveira	PSD	2,382,265	17.06
Cesar Maia	DEM	2,327,634	16.67
Lindbergh Farias (incumbent)	PT	1,419,676	10.17
Chico Alencar	PSOL	1,281,373	9.17
Eduardo Lopes (incumbent)	PRB	507,850	3.64
Miro Teixeira	REDE	430,893	3.09
Everaldo Pereira	PSC	360,688	2.58
José Bonifácio	PDT	313,265	2.24
Aspásia Camargo	PSDB	248,868	1.78
Mattos Nascimento	PRTB	173,968	1.25
Marta Barçante	PCB	52,734	0.38
Cyro Garcia	PSTU	45,588	0.33
Gabrielle Burcci	PMB	27,081	0.19
Walter Cristie	PATRI	23,803	
Samantha Guedes	PSTU	13,680	0.10
Fernando Fagundes	PCO	8,816	
Total		13,965,981	100.00
Valid votes		13,965,981	73.58
Invalid votes		3,326,409	17.52
Blank votes		1,689,111	8.90
Total votes		18,981,501	100.00
Registered voters/turnout		12,401,199	153.06
PSL gain from PT			
PSD gain from PRB			

Popular vote
Bolsonaro	31.36%
Oliveira	17.06%
Maia	16.67%
Farias	10.17%
Alencar	9.17%
Lopes	3.64%
Teixeira	3.09%
Others	8.85%

=== Chamber of Deputies ===
Party	Votes	%	Seats	+/–
Social Liberal Party	1,712,541	22.18	12	▲12
Socialism and Liberty Party	644,641	8.35	4	▲1
Social Democratic Party	524,608	6.79	3	▼3
Democrats	520,033	6.74	4	▲3
Brazilian Democratic Movement	449,251	5.82	3	▼5
Brazilian Republican Party	405,665	5.25	2	Steady
Brazilian Socialist Party	284,069	3.68	1	Steady
Workers' Party	275,205	3.56	1	▼4
Party of the Republic	269,089	3.49	2	▼
Progressistas	264,188	3.42	2	▼
Democratic Labour Party	236,020	3.06	2	▲1
Social Christian Party	205,694	2.66	1	▲1
New Party	201,281	2.61	1	New
Progressive Republican Party	170,136	2.20	1	Steady
Solidariedade	161,531	2.09	1	▼1
Humanist Party of Solidarity	139,147	1.80	1	▲1
Brazilian Social Democracy Party	135,133	1.75	0	▼1
Christian Democracy	134,486	1.74	1	Steady
Avante	130,882	1.70	1	▲1
Brazilian Labour Renewal Party	105,490	1.37	0	Steady
Popular Socialist Party	94,281	1.22	1	▲1
Communist Party of Brazil	89,396	1.16	1	Steady
Sustainability Network	82,437	1.07	0	New
Podemos	75,268	0.97	0	Steady
Brazilian Woman's Party	75,113	0.97	0	New
Brazilian Labour Party	74,038	0.96	0	▼2
Patriota	73,111	0.95	0	Steady
Republican Party of the Social Order	72,580	0.94	1	▼1
Christian Labour Party	56,296	0.73	0	Steady
Green Party	21,671	0.28	0	Steady
Party of National Mobilization	16,548	0.21	0	Steady
Free Fatherland Party	14,492	0.19	0	Steady
Brazilian Communist Party	4,693	0.06	0	Steady
United Socialist Workers' Party	1,756	0.02	0	Steady
Total	7,720,770	100.00	46	–
Valid votes	7,720,770	81.49		
Invalid votes	1,120,225	11.82		
Blank votes	633,446	6.69		
Total votes	9,474,441	100.00		
Registered voters/turnout	12,401,199	76.40		
Source: UOL

=== Legislative Assembly ===
Party	Votes	%	Seats	+/–
Social Liberal Party	1,204,808	15.62	13	▲11
Democrats	546,433	7.09	6	▲6
Brazilian Democratic Movement	515,469	6.68	5	▼10
Socialism and Liberty Party	489,151	6.34	5	Steady
Social Democratic Party	361,440	4.69	3	▼5
Democratic Labour Party	349,499	4.53	3	Steady
Workers' Party	349,202	4.53	3	▼3
Brazilian Republican Party	333,668	4.33	3	▲1
Solidariedade	301,583	3.91	3	Steady
Progressistas	242,374	3.14	2	▼2
Brazilian Social Democracy Party	230,882	2.99	2	Steady
Progressive Republican Party	215,894	2.80	2	▲2
Humanist Party of Solidarity	211,225	2.74	2	▲1
New Party	208,572	2.70	2	New
Social Christian Party	187,775	2.44	2	▲
Brazilian Labour Renewal Party	180,198	2.34	1	Steady
Avante	173,006	2.24	1	Steady
Brazilian Socialist Party	165,872	2.15	1	Steady
Christian Labour Party	151,657	1.97	1	Steady
Patriota	142,300	1.85	1	▲1
Communist Party of Brazil	140,369	1.82	1	Steady
Christian Democracy	132,788	1.72	2	▲1
Party of the Republic	130,382	1.69	1	▼6
Brazilian Woman's Party	130,331	1.69	1	New
Republican Party of the Social Order	123,819	1.61	1	▲
Popular Socialist Party	112,517	1.46	1	▼1
Brazilian Labour Party	109,698	1.42	1	▼1
Podemos	106,514	1.38	1	Steady
Party of National Mobilization	57,252	0.74	0	Steady
Green Party	52,770	0.68	0	Steady
Sustainability Network	27,223	0.35	0	New
Free Fatherland Party	16,734	0.22	0	Steady
Brazilian Communist Party	6,382	0.08	0	Steady
United Socialist Workers' Party	3,426	0.04	0	Steady
Total	7,711,213	100.00	70	–
Valid votes	7,711,213	81.39		
Invalid votes	1,134,456	11.97		
Blank votes	628,772	6.64		
Total votes	9,474,441	100.00		
Registered voters/turnout	12,401,199	76.40		
Source: UOL
