= Comte Bittencourt =

Brazilian politician

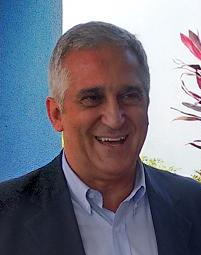

Cidadania National President
- Incumbent
- Assumed office 9 September 2023
- Preceded by: Roberto Freire

State Secretary of Education of Rio de Janeiro
- In office 25 September 2020 – 3 June 2021
- Governor: Wilson Witzel; Cláudio Castro
- Preceded by: Pedro Fernandes Neto
- Succeeded by: Alexandre Valle

Member of the Legislative Assembly of Rio de Janeiro
- In office 1 February 2003 – 1 February 2019
- Constituency: At-large

Vice Mayor of Niterói
- In office 1 January 2017 – 11 December 2017
- Mayor: Rodrigo Neves
- Preceded by: Axel Grael
- Succeeded by: Paulo Bagueira
- In office 1 January 2005 – 1 January 2009
- Mayor: Godofredo Pinto
- Preceded by: Godofredo Pinto
- Succeeded by: José Vicente Filho

Member of the Municipal Chamber of Niterói
- In office 1 January 1993 – 1 February 2003
- Constituency: At-large

Personal details
- Born: Plínio Comte Leite Bittencourt; 2 March 1957 (age 69) Rio de Janeiro, Federal District, Brazil
- Party: Cidadania (2001–present)
- Other political affiliations: PSDB (1988–2001)
- Profession: Teacher

Plínio Comte Leite Bittencourt (born 2 March 1957) is a Brazilian politician. He is affiliated with Cidadania, of which he is the current president. He served as a councilman and as vice-mayor of the city of Niterói. He later became the Secretary of Education for the state of Rio de Janeiro from 2020 to 2021. He was a vice-gubernatorial candidate for the 2018 Rio de Janeiro gubernatorial election, with Eduardo Paes as the gubernatorial candidate, losing to Wilson Witzel and Cláudio Castro.

== Biography ==
During his time as a state deputy, Bittencourt presided over the Education Commission of the Legislative Assembly of Rio de Janeiro. He is the state president of Cidadania in Rio de Janeiro. He was vice-mayor of Niterói during the mayoralty of Godofredo Pinto of the Workers' Party (PT). He was elected again as a state deputy in 2014 with 36,155 votes.

He was selected as vice-mayoral candidate, with Rodrigo Neves as mayor, due to the barring of provisional vice-mayor candidate Axel Grael by the regional Elections' Court. They were elected to their respective offices, with Neves being reelected as mayor. Due to his belief of the city needing a strong representative at the state legislative assembly in order to better address crises at the state level, he resigned from being vice-mayor in order to return being a state deputy. He continued to hold that position until 2019.

On 5 August 2018, in an announcement made during a conference at the Niterói Contemporary Art Museum, with representatives from both Cidadania (then called the PPS) and the Democratas, Bittencourt announced he was running to be vice-governor of Rio de Janeiro, with Rio de Janeiro mayor Eduardo Paes as the gubernatorial candidate. Cidadania later confirmed their support for the ticket, which would go on to reach second place, losing to the ticket led by Witzel and Castro.

Bittencourt served as the State Secretary of Education after Pedro Fernandes Neto was dismissed from the position. Bittencourt's official nomination occurred on 25 September 2020, invited by then-interim governor Cláudio Castro (PSC). He assumed the position during the height of the COVID-19 pandemic, during which discussions of school students returning to classes in-person was high in the public consciousness. He left the position in less than a year, being replaced by Alexandre Valle in 2021.

Political offices
Vacant Title last held by Godofredo Pinto	Vice Mayor of Niterói; 2005–2009	Succeeded by José Vicente Filho
Preceded by Axel Grael	Vice Mayor of Niterói; 2017	Vacant Title next held by Paulo Bagueira
Preceded by Pedro Fernandes Neto	State Secretary of Education of Rio de Janeiro; 2020–2021	Succeeded by Alexandre Valle
Party political offices
Preceded by Roberto Freire	Cidadania National President; 2023–present	Incumbent
