= Marcelo Calero =

Brazilian diplomat and politician

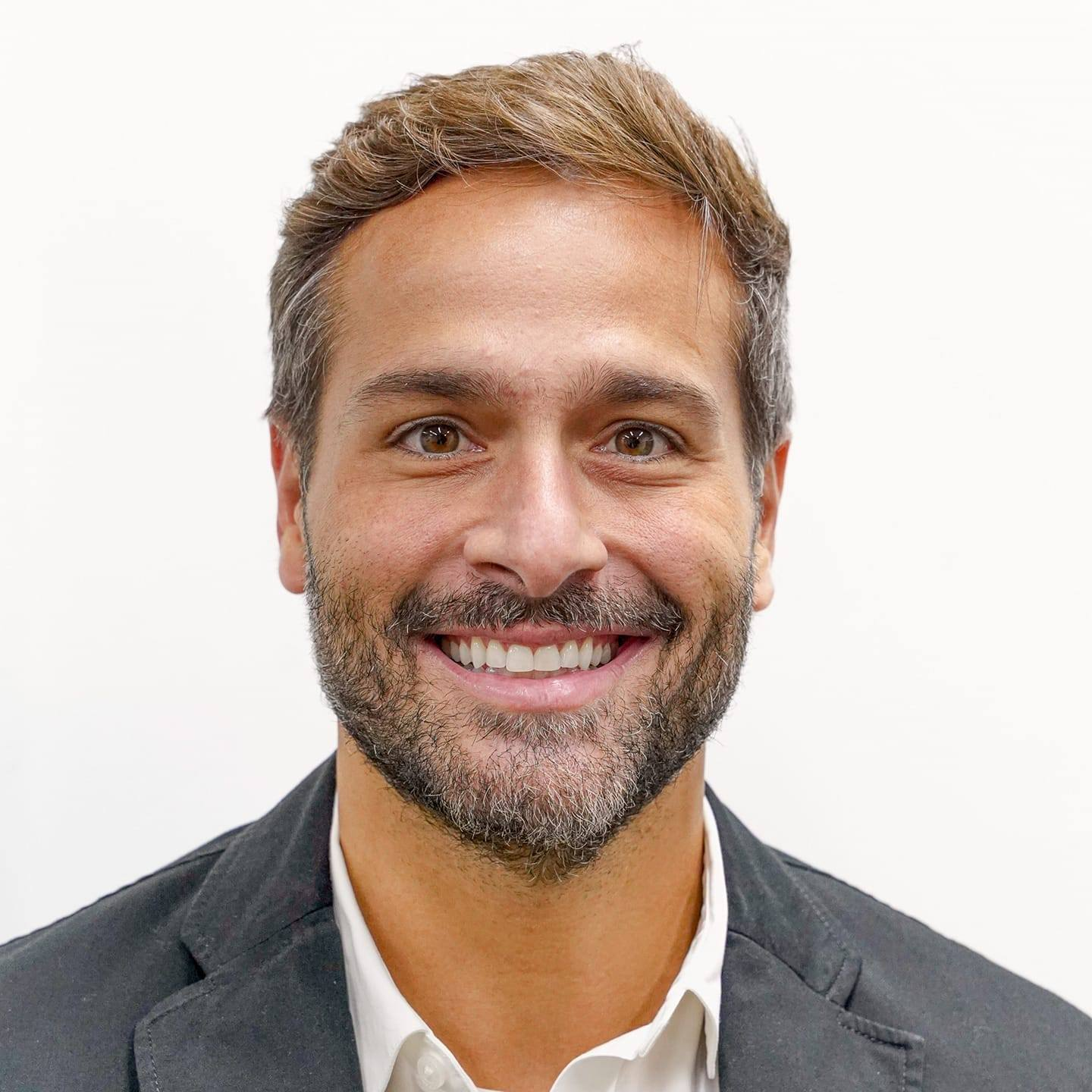
- Official portrait for the 2022 election

Secretary of Government and Public Integrity of Rio de Janeiro
- In office 1 January 2021 – 1 April 2022
- Mayor: Eduardo Paes
- Preceded by: Paulo Albino Santos Soares
- Succeeded by: Tony Chalita

Federal Deputy
- In office 1 February 2019 – 1 February 2023
- Constituency: Rio de Janeiro

Minister of Culture
- In office 24 May 2016 – 18 November 2016
- President: Michel Temer
- Preceded by: Juca Ferreira
- Succeeded by: Roberto Freire

Secretary of Culture of Rio de Janeiro
- In office 15 January 2015 – 18 May 2016
- Mayor: Eduardo Paes
- Preceded by: Sérgio Sá Leitão
- Succeeded by: Júnior Perim

Personal details
- Born: 7 July 1982 (age 44) Rio de Janeiro, Brazil
- Party: PSD (2022–present)
- Other political affiliations: PSDB (2009–2015); PMDB (2016–2018); PPS (2018–2019); Cidadania (2019–2022)
- Education: Rio de Janeiro State University (LLB)

Marcelo Calero Faria Garcia (born 7 July 1982) is a Brazilian diplomat and politician. He served as Minister of Culture under Michel Temer.

In 2018, Calero was elected as federal deputy for the Cidadania Party with the endorsement of Livres, a classical liberal political movement. He is openly gay and the second LGBTQ person to be elected as a Member of Congress.

== Biography ==
Marcelo was born at the Hospital de São Francisco da Penitência, in the Tijuca neighborhood, in Rio de Janeiro. He studied at Colégio Marista São José and, later, at the St. Ignatius College. In 2004, he graduated in Law from the State University of Rio de Janeiro (UERJ), and in 2019 he obtained a master's degree in Political Science from the Institute of Social and Political Studies of the State University of Rio de Janeiro (IESP/UERJ), where he is currently pursuing a doctorate in the same field.

He began his professional career as an intern at the multinational telecommunications and technology company Nokia, becoming a full-time lawyer after graduating. He passed the competitive exam for the Brazilian Securities and Exchange Commission (CVM), where he worked as an executive agent in 2006. He then took the competitive exam for Petrobras, where, after passing, he worked as a lawyer between 2006 and 2007. In 2007, he ranked fifth in the competitive exam for the Rio Branco Institute. After completing his training in Brasília, he was assigned to the Energy Department of the Ministry of Foreign Affairs (Itamaraty), and later worked at the Brazilian Embassy in Mexico.

=== Political career ===
==== Secretariat of Culture ====
In 2013, following a recommendation from an ambassador with whom he had worked, he was seconded to work at the Rio de Janeiro City Hall, assuming the position of Deputy Coordinator of International Relations. In that role, he participated in the organization of World Youth Day (2013), whose highlight was the visit of Pope Francis on his first international trip as Pontiff. He was invited by the mayor to assume the presidency of the Rio450 Committee, an organization created by the municipal administration to organize the celebration of the city's 450th anniversary, with a calendar of more than 600 commemorative events. During this period, he launched the Museum Passport, which offered discounts or free admission to more than 40 museums to the public.

Subsequently, he was invited to take over the Municipal Secretariat of Culture in 2015. During his time leading the department, he was responsible for projects such as: the Cultural Actions, which, with a total investment of R$ 4 million, financed 85 small-scale initiatives throughout the city; the Areninhas; the Libraries of Tomorrow, equipped with free internet access, an excellent educational program and a schedule of socio-educational events; the renovation and inauguration of the Serrador and Ziembinski theaters; the restoration of the City Museum, which reopened a few months after Calero left the position; and the opening of the Museum of Tomorrow, in the Port Zone of Rio.

He left the municipal secretariat to assume the Secretariat of Culture of the Ministry of Education in 2016, but before his inauguration, the department regained its ministerial status with the recreation of the Ministry of Culture.

==== Ministry of Culture ====
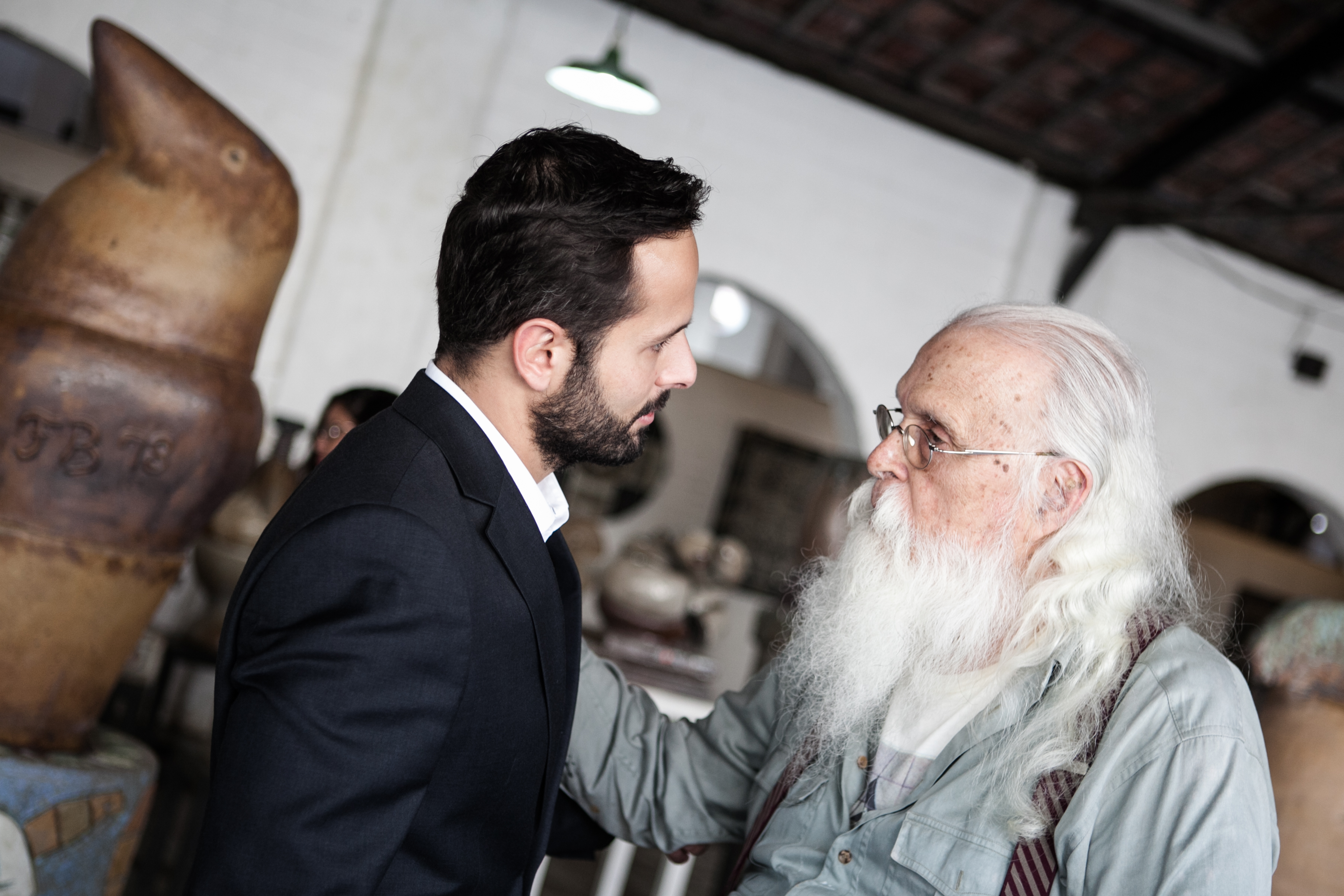
Marcelo Calero and the artist Francisco Brennand.

He assumed the post of Minister of State for Culture in May 2016, remaining in it for five months and 28 days. On November 18, 2016, he resigned from the post after denouncing attempts to interfere in matters within his ministry's purview. At the time, he stated to the Federal Police that he had been strongly pressured by Geddel Vieira Lima, Michel Temer and other members of the government to review a technical decision by the National Institute of Historic and Artistic Heritage (IPHAN), denying a license for a real estate development in Bahia, in which Geddel owned an apartment. Geddel denied the accusation and the spokesperson for the Michel Temer government denied that the president had pressured the former minister to make a decision that "violated internal rules or his convictions," although he confirmed meetings between Michel Temer and Calero to "resolve the impasse" with Geddel. The episode, however, resulted in Geddel's resignation, paving the way for his subsequent arrest, as a result of the loss of his privilegium fori. The case had international repercussions, triggering the biggest crisis of Michel Temer's government up to that point according to some sources.

==== 56th legislature of the Chamber of Deputies, Secretariat of Government and Public Integrity, and return to the Secretariat of Culture. ====
He joined the Popular Socialist Party (PPS) in 2018 and in that year's elections, in his second run for office, he was elected federal deputy. After being the only LGBTQ person in the first tier of the Temer government, he was one of three LGBTQ people elected as federal parliamentarians in 2018. On the other hand, his electoral campaign agenda did not focus on LGBTQ rights. His candidacy was associated with the political group Livres.

In January 2021, he was appointed by Mayor Eduardo Paes as Secretary of Government and Public Integrity of Rio de Janeiro, making him responsible for implementing a compliance program in the city's administration. In March 2022, Calero joined the Social Democratic Party (PSD), the same party as Paes. In addition, he often resumed his position as a federal deputy during votes deemed more important, alternating leaves of absence from his two mandates.

In February 2023, Calero returned to his position as Secretary of Culture for the city of Rio de Janeiro, being appointed again by Mayor Eduardo Paes (PSD). He also assumed the position of federal deputy as an alternate on 9 May 2023, taking leave to return to his position as Secretary of Culture for the city of Rio de Janeiro.

In January 2025, he left the Ministry of Culture and returned to the Chamber of Deputies. In February, he took leave to fulfill a one-year diplomatic mission at the Brazilian embassy in Lebanon, returning to his diplomatic career.

== Electoral performance ==
He ran for federal deputy for the Brazilian Social Democracy Party in 2010, obtaining 2,252 votes. In the 2018 elections, he managed to get elected to that position with around 50,000 votes, surpassing the vote count of Otavio Leite, who became the coalition's alternate. In addition, he was one of three LGBTQ people elected as federal parliamentarians in 2018, alongside Fabiano Contarato and Jean Wyllys. In the 2022 elections, like some of the newcomers from 2018, he failed to get elected again and is currently an alternate.

Political offices
Preceded by Sérgio Sá Leitão	Secretary of Culture of Rio de Janeiro; 2015–2016	Succeeded by Júnior Perim
Preceded by Juca Ferreira	Minister of Culture; 2016–2018	Succeeded by Roberto Freire
Preceded by Paulo Albino Santos Soares	Secretary of Government and Public Integrity of Rio de Janeiro; 2021–2022	Succeeded by Tony Chalita
