= Minister of Culture (Brazil) =

Minister of Culture of Brazil
- Ministra da Cultura
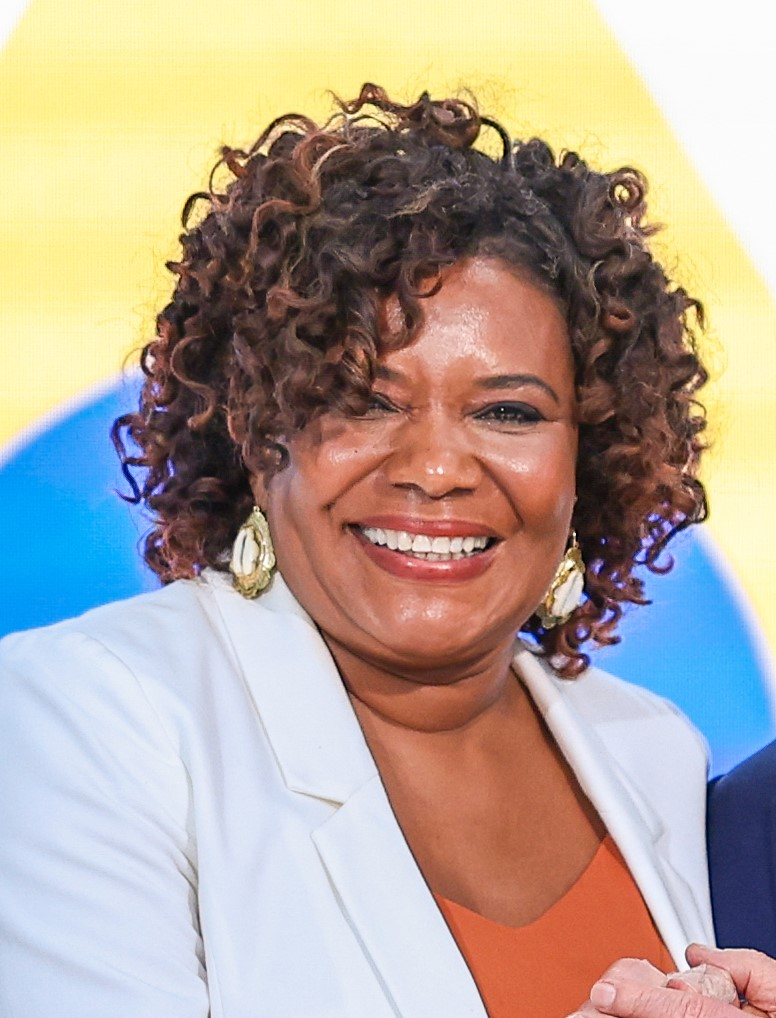
- Incumbent; Margareth Menezes since 1 January 2023
- Style: Madam Minister (informal); The Most Excellent Minister (formal); Her Excellency (diplomatic)
- Type: Ministry
- Abbreviation: MinC
- Member of: the Cabinet
- Reports to: the President
- Seat: Brasília, Federal District
- Appointer: President of Brazil
- Constituting instrument: Constitution of Brazil
- Formation: 15 March 1985; 41 years ago
- First holder: José Aparecido de Oliveira
- Salary: R$ 39,293.32 monthly
- Website: www.gov.br/cultura/

The Ministry of Culture of Brazil is a ministry of the Brazilian government, created on March 15, 1985 by the president José Sarney and extinct on May 12, 2016 by Michel Temer. Before 1985, the duties of the ministry were of authority of the Ministry of Education, which from 1953 to 1985 was called the Ministry of Education and Culture (MEC). Ministry of Culture was responsible for the letters, arts, folklore and other forms of expression of national culture and for the historical, archaeological, artistic and cultural heritage of Brazil. After being extinct, their function was incorporated into the Ministry of Education again.

There were 17 Ministers of Culture. The first was José Aparecido de Oliveira, and the last, Margareth Menezes.

== List of ministers ==
No.	Portrait	Minister	Took office	Left office	Time in office	Party	President
1	José Aparecido de Oliveira	José Aparecido de Oliveira (1929–2007)	15 March 1985	29 May 1985	75 days	MDB	José Sarney (MDB)
2	Aluísio Pimenta	Aluísio Pimenta (1923–2016)	29 May 1985	13 February 1986	260 days	PL	José Sarney (MDB)
3	Celso Furtado	Celso Furtado (1920–2004)	13 February 1986	28 July 1988	2 years, 166 days	Independent	José Sarney (MDB)
4	Hugo Napoleão	Hugo Napoleão (born 1943)	28 July 1988	19 September 1988	53 days	PFL	José Sarney (MDB)
5	José Aparecido de Oliveira	José Aparecido de Oliveira (1929–2007)	19 September 1988	15 March 1990	1 year, 177 days	MDB	José Sarney (MDB)
6	Ipojuca Pontes	Ipojuca Pontes (born 1942)	15 March 1990	10 March 1991	360 days	Independent	Fernando Collor (PRN)
7	Sérgio Paulo Rouanet	Sérgio Paulo Rouanet (1934–2022)	10 March 1991	2 October 1992	1 year, 206 days	Independent	Fernando Collor (PRN)
8	Antônio Houaiss	Antônio Houaiss (1915–1999)	20 October 1992	1 September 1993	316 days	PSB	Itamar Franco (MDB)
9	Jerônimo Moscardo	Jerônimo Moscardo (born 1940)	1 September 1993	9 December 1993	99 days	Independent	Itamar Franco (MDB)
10	Luiz Roberto Nascimento Silva	Luiz Roberto Nascimento Silva (born 1952)	9 December 1993	1 January 1995	1 year, 23 days	Independent	Itamar Franco (MDB)
11	Francisco Weffort	Francisco Weffort (1937–2021)	1 January 1995	1 January 2003	8 years, 0 days	Independent	Fernando Henrique Cardoso (PSDB)
12	Gilberto Gil	Gilberto Gil (born 1942)	1 January 2003	30 July 2008	5 years, 211 days	PV	Luiz Inácio Lula da Silva (PT)
13	Juca Ferreira	Juca Ferreira (born 1949)	30 July 2008	1 January 2011	2 years, 155 days	PV	Luiz Inácio Lula da Silva (PT)
14	Ana de Hollanda	Ana de Hollanda (born 1948)	1 January 2011	13 September 2012	1 year, 256 days	Independent	Dilma Rousseff (PT)
15	Marta Suplicy	Marta Suplicy (born 1945)	13 September 2012	11 November 2014	2 years, 59 days	PT	Dilma Rousseff (PT)
–	Ana Cristina Wanzeler	Ana Cristina Wanzeler (born 1960); Acting	11 November 2014	1 January 2015	51 days	Independent	Dilma Rousseff (PT)
16	Juca Ferreira	Juca Ferreira (born 1949)	1 January 2015	12 May 2016	1 year, 132 days	PT	Dilma Rousseff (PT)
17	Marcelo Calero	Marcelo Calero (born 1982)	24 May 2016	18 November 2016	178 days	Independent	Michel Temer (MDB)
18	Roberto Freire	Roberto Freire (born 1942)	18 November 2016	22 May 2017	185 days	PPS	Michel Temer (MDB)
–	João Batista de Andrade	João Batista de Andrade (born 1939); Acting	22 May 2017	24 July 2017	63 days	PPS	Michel Temer (MDB)
19	Sérgio Sá Leitão	Sérgio Sá Leitão (born 1967)	24 July 2017	1 January 2019	1 year, 161 days	Independent	Michel Temer (MDB)
20	Margareth Menezes	Margareth Menezes (born 1962)	1 January 2023	Incumbent	3 years, 249 days	Independent	Luiz Inácio Lula da Silva (PT)

== See also ==
- Federal institutions of Brazil
