= Roberto Freire (politician) =

Brazilian politician (born 1942)

- Freire in 2016

Cidadania National President
- In office 26 January 1992 – 9 September 2023
- Succeeded by: Comte Bittencourt

Minister of Culture
- In office 23 November 2016 – 22 May 2017
- President: Michel Temer
- Preceded by: Marcelo Calero
- Succeeded by: João Batista de Andrade (acting)

Member of the Chamber of Deputies
- In office 20 March 2015 – 1 February 2019
- Constituency: São Paulo
- In office 1 February 2011 – 1 February 2015
- Constituency: São Paulo
- In office 1 February 2003 – 1 February 2007
- Constituency: Pernambuco
- In office 1 February 1979 – 1 February 1995
- Constituency: Pernambuco

Senator for Pernambuco
- In office 1 February 1995 – 1 February 2003

Member of the Legislative Assembly of Pernambuco
- In office 1 February 1975 – 1 February 1979
- Constituency: At-large

Personal details
- Born: Roberto João Pereira Freire; 20 April 1942 (age 84) Recife, Pernambuco, Brazil
- Party: Independent (2023–present)
- Other political affiliations: MDB (1966–1979); PMDB (1979–1985); PCB (1985–1992); Cidadania (1992–2023)
- Profession: Lawyer

Roberto João Pereira Freire (born 20 April 1942) is a Brazilian lawyer and politician.

Freire was born in Recife. He is the president of Cidadania, former Federal Deputy, and former Minister of Culture appointed by president Michel Temer. He resigned from the office on 18 May 2017

== Car Wash Scandal ==
Roberto Freire resigned as minister, due to his involvement with the crimes found in the Operation Car Wash.

The biggest implicated company, Odebrecht kept an entire department to coordinate the payment of bribe to politicians. In the Car Wash Operation, officers seized several electronic spreadsheets linking the payments to nicknames. Every corrupt politician received a nickname based on physical characteristics, public trajectory, personal infos, owned cars/boats, origin place or generic preferences. Roberto Freire's nickname was 'Curitiba', alusing the city with same name.

Political offices
Preceded by Marcelo Calero	Minister of Culture; 2016–2017	Succeeded by João Batista de Andrade (acting)
Party political offices
New political party	Cidadania National President; 1992–2023	Succeeded by Comte Bittencourt
