= Eduardo Lopes (politician) =

Brazilian politician (born 1964)

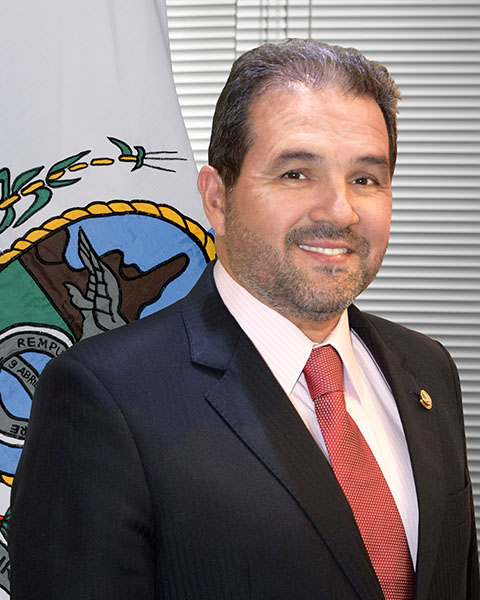

State Secretary of Agriculture, Livestock, Fishing and Supply of Rio de Janeiro
- In office 1 January 2019 – 4 October 2019
- Governor: Wilson Witzel
- Preceded by: Alex Grillo
- Succeeded by: Marcelo Queiroz

Senator for Rio de Janeiro
- In office 1 January 2017 – 1 February 2019
- Preceded by: Marcelo Crivella
- Succeeded by: Arolde de Oliveira
- In office 6 March 2012 – 14 March 2014
- Preceded by: Marcelo Crivella

Minister of Fishing and Aquaculture
- In office 17 March 2014 – 1 January 2015
- President: Dilma Rousseff
- Preceded by: Marcelo Crivella
- Succeeded by: Helder Barbalho

Personal details
- Born: Eduardo Benedito Lopes; 19 September 1964 (age 62) Santo André, São Paulo, Brazil
- Party: Republicanos (2010–present)
- Other political affiliations: PSB (2006–2010)
- Spouse: Rosana Lopes
- Occupation: Radio broadcaster

Eduardo Benedito Lopes (born 19 September 1964, in Santo André) is a Brazilian politician and a member of the Brazilian Republican Party (PRB). He served as Minister of Fishing and Aquaculture in the government of Dilma Rousseff.

Lopes was elected in 2010 as the first surrogate of senator Marcelo Crivella. Due to Crivella's resignation to assume the office of mayor of Rio de Janeiro, Eduardo assumed the office as permanent senator.

He is an evangelical and a member of the Pentecostal movement the Universal Church of the Kingdom of God (IURD).

Political offices
| Preceded by Marcelo Crivella | Minister of Fishing and Aquaculture; 2014–15 | Succeeded by Helder Barbalho |
| Preceded by Alex Grillo | State Secretary of Agriculture, Livestock, Fishing and Supply of Rio de Janeiro; 2019–present | Incumbent |
