= Axel Grael =

Brazilian forest engineer, environmentalist, sailor and politician

Mayor of Niterói
- In office 1 January 2021 – 1 January 2025
- Vice-mayor: Paulo Bagueira
- Preceded by: Rodrigo Neves
- Succeeded by: Rodrigo Neves

Secretary of Planning of Niterói
- In office 1 January 2017 – 2 June 2020

Vice-mayor of Niterói
- In office 1 January 2013 – 31 December 2016
- Preceded by: José Vicente Filho
- Succeeded by: Comte Bittencourt

Personal details
- Born: Axel Schmidt Grael; 22 July 1958 (age 66); São Paulo, Brazil
- Political party: PV (1988–2020); PDT (2020–present)

Axel Schmidt Grael (born 22 July 1958) is a Brazilian forester, environmentalist, sailor, and politician who has been the mayor of the city of Niterói since 2021. He is currently affiliated with the Democratic Labour Party (PDT). He had previously served as, among other positions, secretary of planning and vice-mayor. He comes from a prominent family of sailors, including his brothers Torben and Lars Grael, and his nephew and niece Marco and Martine Grael.

== Biography ==
Grael was born to Ingrid Schmidt, a prominent athlete in her own right, and coronel Dickson Melges Grael. He began his environmental activism with the creation of the Movimento de Resistência Ecológica (MORE), an environmental movement in the state of Rio de Janeiro and in Niterói. He led initiatives for the protection of Guanabara Bay and for the campaign for the creation of Serra da Tiririca State Park. In 1991, he was nominated as president of the State Institute of Forests (IEF). He then oversaw the Environmental Engineering State Foundation (FEEMA) in two terms, from 1999 to 2000 and again from 2007 to 2008, and was sub-secretary of the Environment of the State of Rio de Janeiro. He continued his career as a government employee, working as the foresting engineer for the city of Rio de Janeiro.

=== Political career ===
A former long-time affiliate of the Green Party (PV), he became the vice-mayoral candidate for the city of Niterói, with Rodrigo Neves as the mayoral candidate. They were elected with 132,001 votes, or 52.55% of the vote. He was again the candidate for vice-mayor with Neves as mayor in 2016; However, judge Daniela Ferro barred his registration for the candidacy due to pending settlements from his time as president of the IEF. He was replaced as vice-mayoral candidate by Comte Bittencourt. After Neves and Bittencourt won the campaign, Grael became the Secretary of Planning for the city, starting in 2017.

In January 2020, he switched his party affiliation to the PDT, the day after he confirmed his pre-candidacy to run for mayor of Niterói in that year's municipal elections. He officially became a candidate on 31 August, selecting as vice-mayoral candidate councilman and president of the municipal chamber Paulo Bagueira of Solidariedade. They were elected with 151,846 votes, or 62.56% of the vote.
