= Wilson Witzel =

Brazilian politician

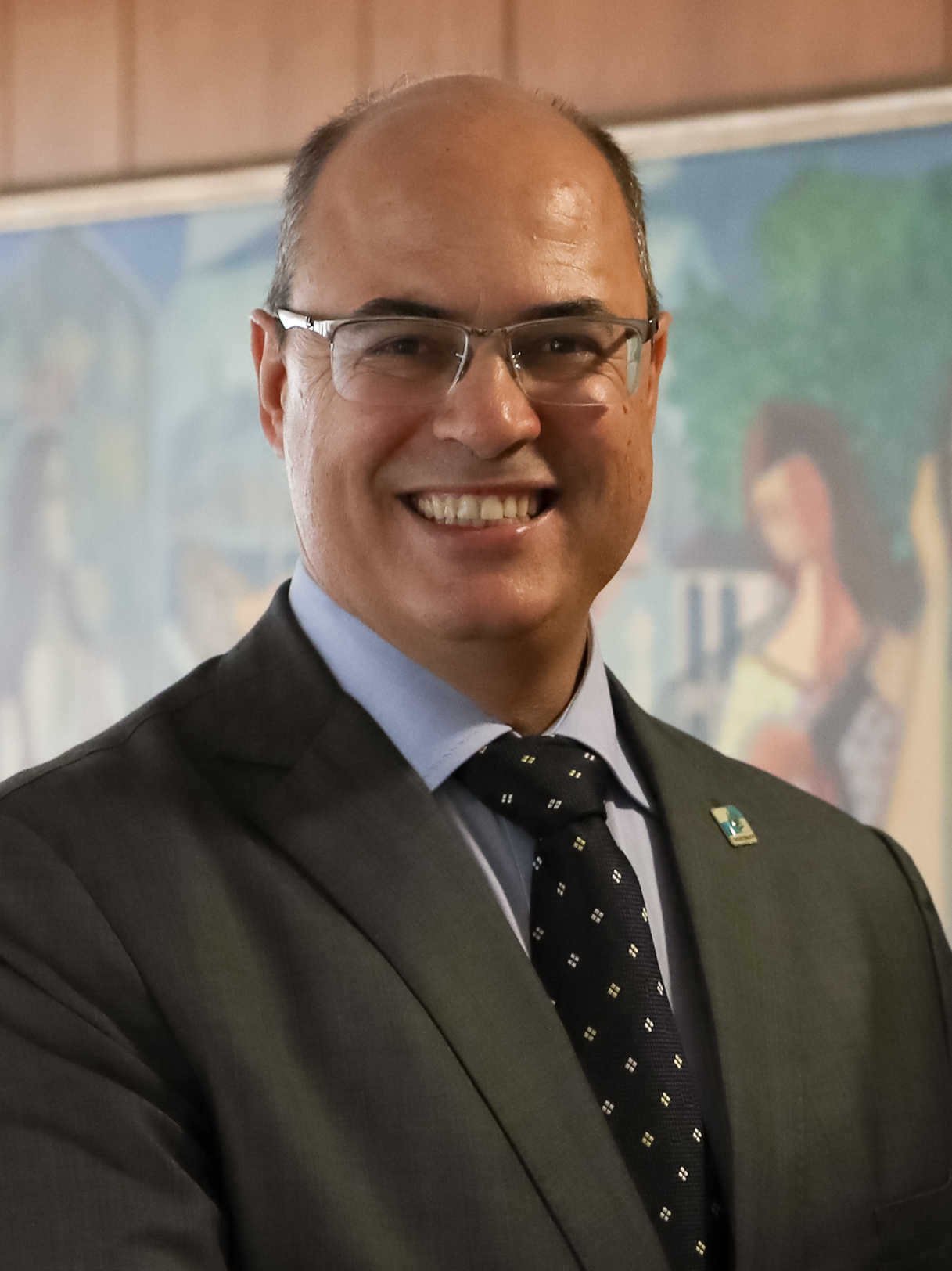

Governor of Rio de Janeiro
- In office 1 January 2019 – 30 April 2021; Suspended: 28 August 2020 – 30 April 2021
- Vice Governor: Cláudio Castro
- Preceded by: Francisco Dornelles (acting)
- Succeeded by: Cláudio Castro

Personal details
- Born: Wilson José Witzel; 19 February 1968 (age 58) Jundiaí, São Paulo, Brazil
- Party: PSC (2018–present)
- Spouse: Helena Alves Brandão (m. 2004)
- Education: Fluminense Federal University (LL.B.)
- Occupation: Politician, Lawyer, Professor of Economic Criminal Law
- Known for: Former Federal Judge
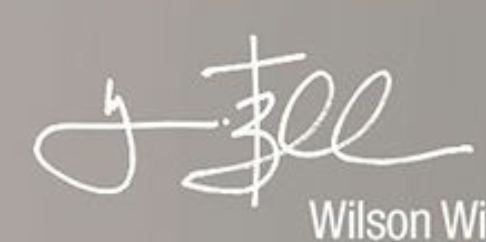
- Signature

Military service
- Allegiance: Brazil
- Branch/service: Brazilian Navy
- Rank: 2nd Lieutenant

Wilson José Witzel (born 19 February 1968) is a Brazilian politician and lawyer who was the 63rd Governor of the state of Rio de Janeiro. A member of Christian Democracy (DC), Witzel is a former federal judge and is an ex-marine. On 28 October 2018, he was elected Governor of the State of Rio de Janeiro with a four-year term beginning in January 2019, replacing Luiz Fernando Pezão, until his impeachment in April 2021 for corruption.

Witzel holds a master's in Civil Law, and has been a professor of Criminal Law for more than 20 years. As a federal judge, he served in different civil and criminal courts in Rio de Janeiro and in Vitória (Espírito Santo).

== Life and career ==
Witzel was born in 1968 in Jundiaí. He spent 17 years acting in civil and criminal courts. He was a tenured federal judge of the 6th Federal Civil Court until 2 March 2018, when he resigned to join the (PSC).

He officially announced his candidacy for the position of Governor of the State of Rio de Janeiro on 21 July 2018. His deputy was Rio de Janeiro city councilor Cláudio Castro, also of the PSC.

Witzel initially polled at just 1%, tied with André Monteiro (PRTB), Dayse Oliveira (PSTU) and Marcelo Trindade (NOVO), and was only ahead of Luiz Eugênio Honorato (PCO). He was behind Romário (PODE), Eduardo Paes (DEM), Anthony Garotinho (PRP), Tarcísio Motta (PSOL), Indio da Costa (PSD), Pedro Fernandes (PDT) and Marcia Tiburi (PT).

Polls closer to the election placed him much higher at 17%, still behind Eduardo Paes, who had 27%, and tied with Romario. This was considered surprising because Witzel was a relatively unknown in the state and had only 27 seconds of electoral advertising time. Many commentators attributed his popularity to his early endorsement of Jair Bolsonaro PSL.

On 7 October 2018, in the first round of the 2018 Rio de Janeiro gubernatorial election, Witzel received 3,154,771 votes or 41.28%, coming in first; second was Eduardo Paes, of the DEM, former mayor of Rio de Janeiro, with 1,494,831 votes or 19.56%, Tarcísio Motta came third with 10.72%. Witzel and Paes advanced to the second round. The result was considered a surprise given Witzel's low standing in the early polls.

In the second round of the elections, Wilson Witzel was endorsed by the PRTB's candidate André Monteiro, the Party of the Republic (now known as the Liberal Party), from PSD candidate Indio da Costa, who initially remained neutral saying that he did not support Witzel, but later decided to declare his support for the Witzel, and from PDT's candidate Pedro Fernandes.

On 28 October 2018, in the second round of the gubernatorial election, Witzel obtained 4,675,355 votes or 59.87%. He was thus elected Governor of the State of Rio de Janeiro for a term of 4 years starting January 2019; his opponent, Eduardo Paes, from DEM, received 3,134,400 votes or 40.13%.

An ally of president Jair Bolsonaro, Witzel was elected after promising a "slaughter" of drug gangsters. Wilson Witzel officially took office as governor on 1 January 2019. However, because Jair Bolsonaro took office as president of Brazil on the same day, Witzel's ceremony was postponed to 2 January 2019. For his ceremony, Witzel had a special "governor's sash" made to be handed over to him by then-acting governor Francisco Dornelles. The practice, however, isn't official in the state of Rio de Janeiro, and wasn't tradition in the state's ceremonies.

In September 2019, following the killing of an eight-year-old girl, hundreds protested in anger in the Complexo do Alemão favela where she was shot, and the hashtag "#aculpaedowitzel" (Portuguese: A culpa é do Witzel, lit. 'It's Witzel's fault') led trending topics in Brazil. Cartoons showing the smiling governor wiping blood from his face.

On 14 April 2020, Witzel tested positive for COVID-19 shortly after on 11 June 2020 an impeachment process was opened against Witzel alleging graft in purchase of medical supplies.

On 28 August 2020, the Superior Court of Justice suspended Witzel from office as a result of suspected fraudulent purchases during the COVID-19 pandemic.

Political offices
Preceded by Francisco Dornelles (interim)	Governor of Rio de Janeiro; 2019–2021	Succeeded by Cláudio Castro
