= Viva Rio =

- Founded: December 1993 in Rio de Janeiro
- Type: Non-profit; NGO
- Purpose: Humanitarian
- Location: Rio de Janeiro, Brazil
- Region served: Rio de Janeiro, Brazil/ Bel Air, Haiti
- Director: Rubem Cesar Fernandes
- Website: www.vivario.org.br

Viva Rio, a nongovernmental organization based in Rio de Janeiro, Brazil, was founded in December 1993 to combat the growing violence in the city. The organization has expanded into a multinational organization with a goal “to promote a culture of peace and social development through field work, research and formulation of public policies”. Its mission statement is “to integrate a divided society and develop a culture of peace, integrating with civil society and public policies, working at grassroots and internationally through: designing and testing solutions to social problems, consultancies, advocacy, training, campaigns, communication”.

The 2000 Prince Claus Awards, with the theme "Urban Heroes", gave one of three top Principal Awards to the Viva Rio organization. The Principal Award of €100,000 was presented during a ceremony at the Royal Palace in Amsterdam.

== History of Organization ==
=== Brazil ===
Viva Rio was founded in December 1993 as a reaction to the city of Rio de Janeiro's increase in the number of violent crimes committed. In 1993, according to the US State Department, extrajudicial killings of criminal suspects and minors by vigilante groups were the principle human rights problem in Brazil. The July 23, 1993, Candelaria Massacre, and the August 31, 1993, Vigário Geral massacre were two events that led leaders from different sectors of society, including those of the media, cultural groups, and merchants to gather at general meetings throughout the month of September. From these meetings emerged the idea that an institution needed to be created to promote what the city lacked; a culture of nonviolence and community development. Viva Rio was consequently founded two months later. That year, the organization created a volunteer project designed to provide low-income communities with material necessities.

In 1994, Viva Rio collaborated with Rio de Janeiro's Military Police in the organization of the government's new public security policy of community policing. The aim was to replace the repressive policing that was contributing to the violence rather than reducing it. Between 1983 and 1994 the homicide rate in the city of Rio de Janeiro grew 88%, from 41.8 to 78.1 per 100,000 people. From 1994 to 1998 homicides fell 28%, from 78.0 to 60.8 per 100,000 people. This drop in the city's homicide rate occurred parallel to the changes in policing methods largely brought about through the collaboration of Viva Rio.

One of Viva Rio's most prominent campaigns is Rio Desarma-se (Rio Disarm yourself), aimed at reducing the number of arms that are in the possession of civilians rather than government or law enforcement personnel. According to a survey done by Viva Rio and the Institute of Religious Studies, around 15 million or 90% of firearms in Brazil fall under this category. Various collection points have been set up throughout the city, and with the assistance of the Military and Civil police forces, are able to collect and destroy illegal weapons. On June 24, 2001, Viva Rio, in partnership with the municipal government of Rio de Janeiro, destroyed 100,000 firearm that had been collect and confiscated throughout the city, making it the largest simultaneous arms decommissioning in recent history. According to Brazil's Ministry of Justice, disarmament campaigns, such as those organized by Viva Rio, will become a permanent part of national gun control policy on June 1, 2011. From Viva Rio's work with gun control, the organization has expanded its network and areas of operation to include work in human rights, education, sports, environment and community development.

=== Haiti ===
In 2004, Viva Rio became a consultant to the United Nations Development Program’s Peacekeeping operation in Haiti. The United Nations has been present in Haiti since the 1991 coup. When the internal conflict re-escalated in February 2004 and turned towards street violence, the United Nations Security Council passed Resolution 1542 establishing a new peacekeeping operation in Haiti. Under these conditions Viva Rio has established itself in the capital city of Port-au-Prince and has engaged local residents through various social programs. Between 2004 and 2010 Viva Rio has coordinated, with the help of the local population, various social projects. These projects include the following: the purification and distribution of potable water; providing basic sanitation by installing latrines and waste management systems; and the establishment of a sports campaign aimed at keeping kids from gang violence. The January 2010 earthquake temporarily halted such projects. As a result, Viva Rio focused its efforts on mobilizing disaster relief. Throughout Brazil, charity events, such as Benex Festival in Rio de Janeiro, which gathered 13 tons of nonperishable goods in 2 days, have provided Haitians with basic necessities.

== Projects ==
Viva Rio is involved in multiple social projects that focus on three areas of concern: community outreach, communications and human security. These projects focus on researching a specific problem, developing solutions, and implementing them. These solutions are first implemented on a small scale, and depending on the success, are then applied on a city or regional level.

=== Community Outreach ===
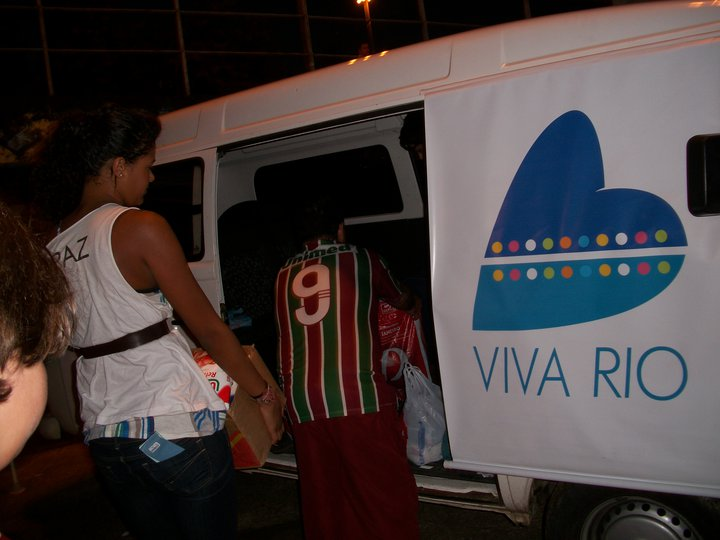
Vivario food drive

The community outreach programs are focused on the education of children and young adults throughout Rio de Janeiro. The projects include basic youth education, job market training, and projects that promote constructive activities, such as sports and gardening, within low income neighborhoods. This aims to encourage youth to engage in improving their lives as well as uplifting their communities.

Besides education, the community outreach programs involve projects that work to provide low-interest loans to entrepreneurs and local businesses in Rio de Janeiro. “VivaCred, Viva Rio’s flagship credit program has provided over US$5 million in low interest loans”. Apart from their loan programs “the VIVASEGURO program informs community members about insurance and savings”.

=== Communication ===
Viva Rio works to bring communication access of various types to the favelas (slums) of Rio de Janeiro. The installation of internet access points throughout low-income neighborhoods, allows the residents to market their commercial products to a wider audience. These projects stimulate the local economies and reduce the isolation faced by the favelas due to lack of internet and telecommunications.

Apart from stimulating economic development, Viva Rio works to bring social understanding between residents of the favelas and the rest of the population in Rio de Janeiro. By creating and supporting project such as Viva Favela, an internet communication network, residents of the favelas are able to post information about their communities. This information varies from dissatisfaction with living conditions, to the publication of social and cultural events.
