= Lindbergh Farias =

Brazilian politician

- Farias in 2022

Member of the Chamber of Deputies
- Incumbent
- Assumed office 1 February 2023
- Constituency: Rio de Janeiro
- In office 1 February 2003 – 21 December 2004
- Constituency: Rio de Janeiro
- In office 1 February 1995 – 1 February 1999
- Constituency: Rio de Janeiro

Senator for Rio de Janeiro
- In office 1 February 2011 – 1 February 2019

Mayor of Nova Iguaçu
- In office 1 January 2005 – 31 March 2010
- Vice Governor: Itamar Serpa; Sheila Gama
- Preceded by: Mário Marques
- Succeeded by: Sheila Gama

Personal details
- Born: Luiz Lindbergh Farias Filho; 8 December 1969 (age 56) João Pessoa, Paraíba, Brazil
- Party: PT (2001–present)
- Other political affiliations: PCdoB (1985–1997); PSTU (1997–2001)
- Spouse: Maria Antonia Goulart (m. 1994; div. 2018)
- Domestic partner: Gleisi Hoffmann (2020–present)
- Children: 3

Luiz Lindbergh Farias Filho, commonly known only as Lindbergh Farias (born 8 December 1969), is a Brazilian former student union leader and politician.

Lindberg became famous as student leader, specially in 1992, when he was president of the National Union of Students (UNE) and one of the main leaders of the student movement Caras-Pintadas (Painted Faces) against the then president Fernando Collor de Mello, who was his ally before Lindberg's political career. Farias attended Medicine and Law colleges, but never got a degree.

After leaving the student movement, he was elect Federal Deputy for two legislatures. He was also elect and re-elect Mayor of Nova Iguaçu, in Baixada Fluminense. In 2010, Lindbergh was elect Senator for Rio de Janeiro.

In 2014, he ran for Governor of Rio de Janeiro for the Workers' Party (PT), when he placed 4th, with 10% of the valid votes.

== Early years ==
=== Childhood ===
He was born on 8 December 1969 in João Pessoa, capital of Paraíba. Farias is son of the doctor Luiz Lindbergh Farias and the university professor Ana Maria. He was named after his father, a tribute to the grandfather of the American aviator Charles Lindbergh, who was the first man to cross the Atlantic Ocean in 1927.

Lindbergh spent his childhood in Paraíba, along with his siblings Fred, Rodrigo and Georgiana.

=== Student movement ===
His grandfather was a Communist Party voter. His father studied in Rio de Janeiro and was National Vice President of the Nationals Union of Students in 1961. According to himself, Lindbergh grew up reading about the left-wing thinking and, at the age of 14, considered himself a socialist. At 16, joined Communist Party of Brazil (PCdoB), where he acted in the youth wing, being elect National President of the Union of the Socialist Youth (UJS) a few years later.

At 17, began his studies in Medicine at Federal University of Paraíba. In 1990, joined, upon submission to selection by the entrance exam, in the Law course, and joined the Students' Central Directory (DCE). At 21, Farias was elect Secretary-General of the National Union of Students and moved to São Paulo.

In 1992, Lindbergh Fariais was elect president of UNE, marking the beginning of his political career. In that year, he met the unionist and metalworker Luiz Inácio Lula da Silva.

=== Painted Faces ===
As he became president of UNE, moved to Rio de Janeiro and, in the student movement, led the historical movement of the "Painted Faces" in 1992, which contributed for the impeachment of the then president Fernando Collor de Mello.

In an interview to Folha de S.Paulo, Lindbergh said: "We left the museum, walked through Avenida Paulista, went down to Avenida Brigadeiro Luiz Antônio and finished in front of the Law School of USP, in Largo São Francisco".

== Political career ==
Lindbergh was elect Federal Deputy for the Communist Party of Brazil in the 1994 elections, being the left-wing candidate most voted. In 1996, he was elect National President of the Union of the Socialist Youth. Adhered to the trotskyism in 1997 and joined the Unified Workers' Socialist Party (PSTU). In the Chamber of Deputies, opposed the government of Fernando Henrique Cardoso (PSDB).

Educational offices
Preceded by Patrícia de Angelis	President of UNE; 1992–1993	Succeeded by Fernando Gusmão
Political offices
Preceded by Mário Marques	Mayor of Nova Iguaçu; 2005–2010	Succeeded by Sheila Gama
Party political offices
Preceded by Vladimir Palmeira (2006)	PT nominee for Governor of Rio de Janeiro; 2014	Succeeded by Marcia Tiburi
