= Marcia Tiburi =

Brazilian philosopher, professor, writer and politician

Márcia Tiburi
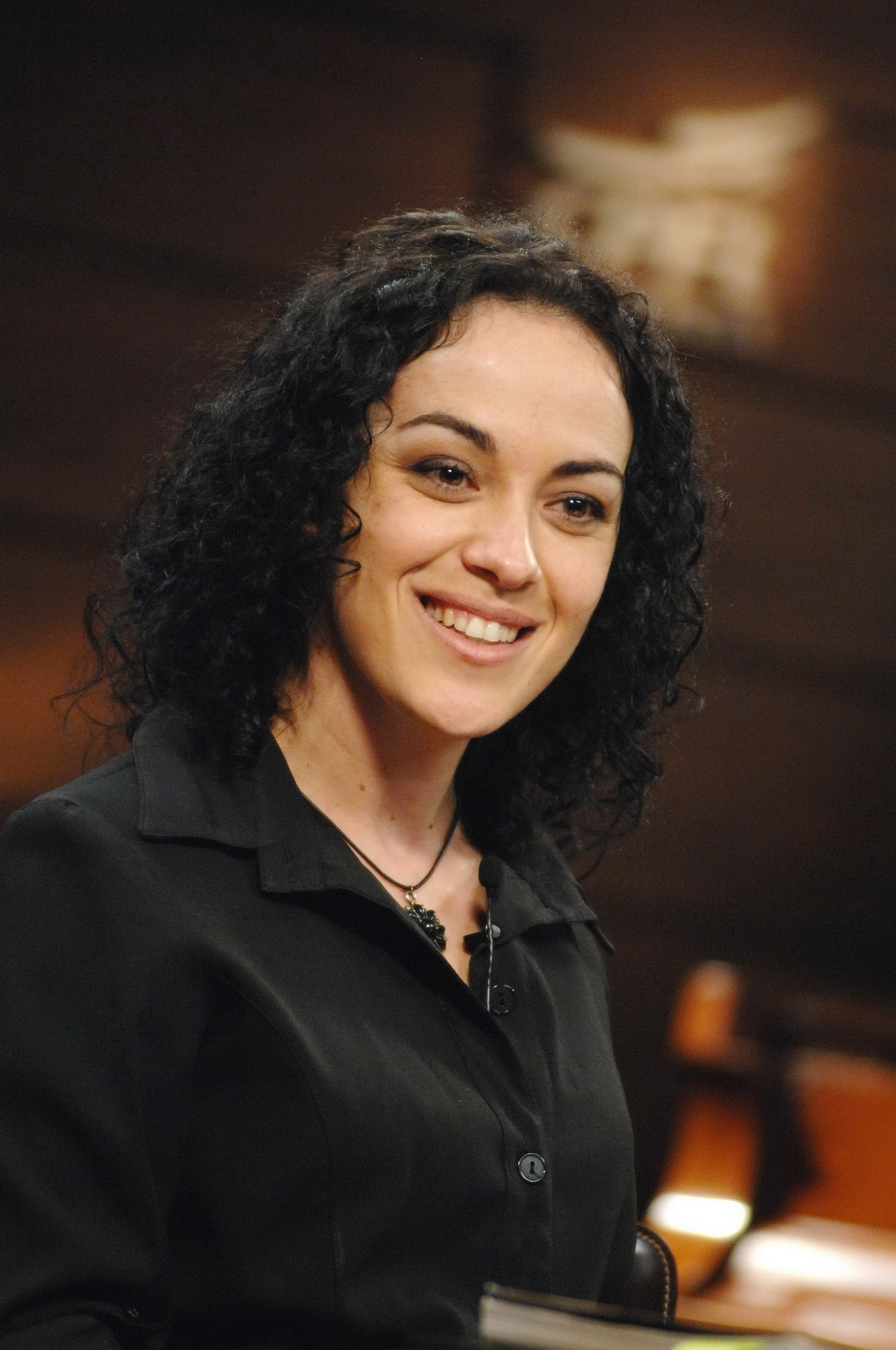
- Márcia Tiburi in 2008
- Born: Márcia Angelita Tiburi; 6 April 1970 (age 56); Vacaria, Rio Grande do Sul, Brazil
- Education: Pontifical Catholic University of Rio Grande do Sul (PhB, M.Phil.); Federal University of Rio Grande do Sul (BA, PhD)
- Occupations: Writer, philosopher, professor
- Notable work: O manto e a Magnólia; Filosofia cinza; Filosofia em Comum
- Political party: PSOL (2013–2017); PT (2018–present)
- Website: marciatiburi.com.br

Márcia Angelita Tiburi (born 6 April 1970) is a Brazilian plastic artist, professor of philosophy, literary critic, and writer. Her main areas of research are ethics, aesthetics, and the philosophy of knowledge.

In 1990, she obtained a degree in philosophy from the Pontifical Catholic University of Rio Grande do Sul and in 1996 in Arts from the Federal University of Rio Grande do Sul, a master's degree in philosophy from the Pontifical Catholic University of Rio Grande do Sul (1994) and a Ph.D. in philosophy from the Federal University of Rio Grande do Sul (1999) with an emphasis on contemporary philosophy.

She has published philosophy books, among them the anthology As Mulheres e a Filosofia (Women and Philosophy), and O Corpo Torturado (The Tortured Body), besides Uma outra história da razão (Another history of Reason). Through the publisher Escritos, she published, as coauthor, Diálogo sobre o Corpo (Dialogue on the Body), in 2004, and individually Filosofia Cinza - a melancolia e o corpo nas dobras da escrita (Gray Philosophy - melancholy and the body in the folds of writing). In 2005 she published Metamorfoses do Conceito, and her first novel in the series Trilogia íntima, Magnolia, which was a finalist of the Jabuti Prize in 2006. That same year she released the second volume A Mulher de Costas of the trilogy. She also writes for specialized magazines, as well as for the general press.

Tiburi appeared, weekly, in the television program Saia Justa, on channel GNT. In 2012, she published the novel Era Meu esse Rosto and the books Diálogo / Dança e Diálogo / Fotografia by the publisher SENAC-SP. In 2015 she published the book Como conversar com um fascista (How to Talk to a Fascist).

She is a professor of the postgraduate program in Education, Art, and History of Culture at the Mackenzie Presbyterian University.

== Political career ==
Tiburi is filiated to the Workers' Party. She ran for Governor of Rio de Janeiro in the 2018 state election, finishing in 7th place, with 5.85% of the votes.

Tiburi left Brazil in December 2018, settling in Paris; she later explained that death threats, instigated by the harassment led by the Free Brazil Movement (MBL), turning her life into a "living hell", motivated her decision. The MBL boasted about having expelled her from Brazil.

Party political offices
Preceded by Lindbergh Farias	PT nominee for Governor of Rio de Janeiro; 2014	Most recent
