= Arolde de Oliveira =

Brazilian politician (1937–2020)

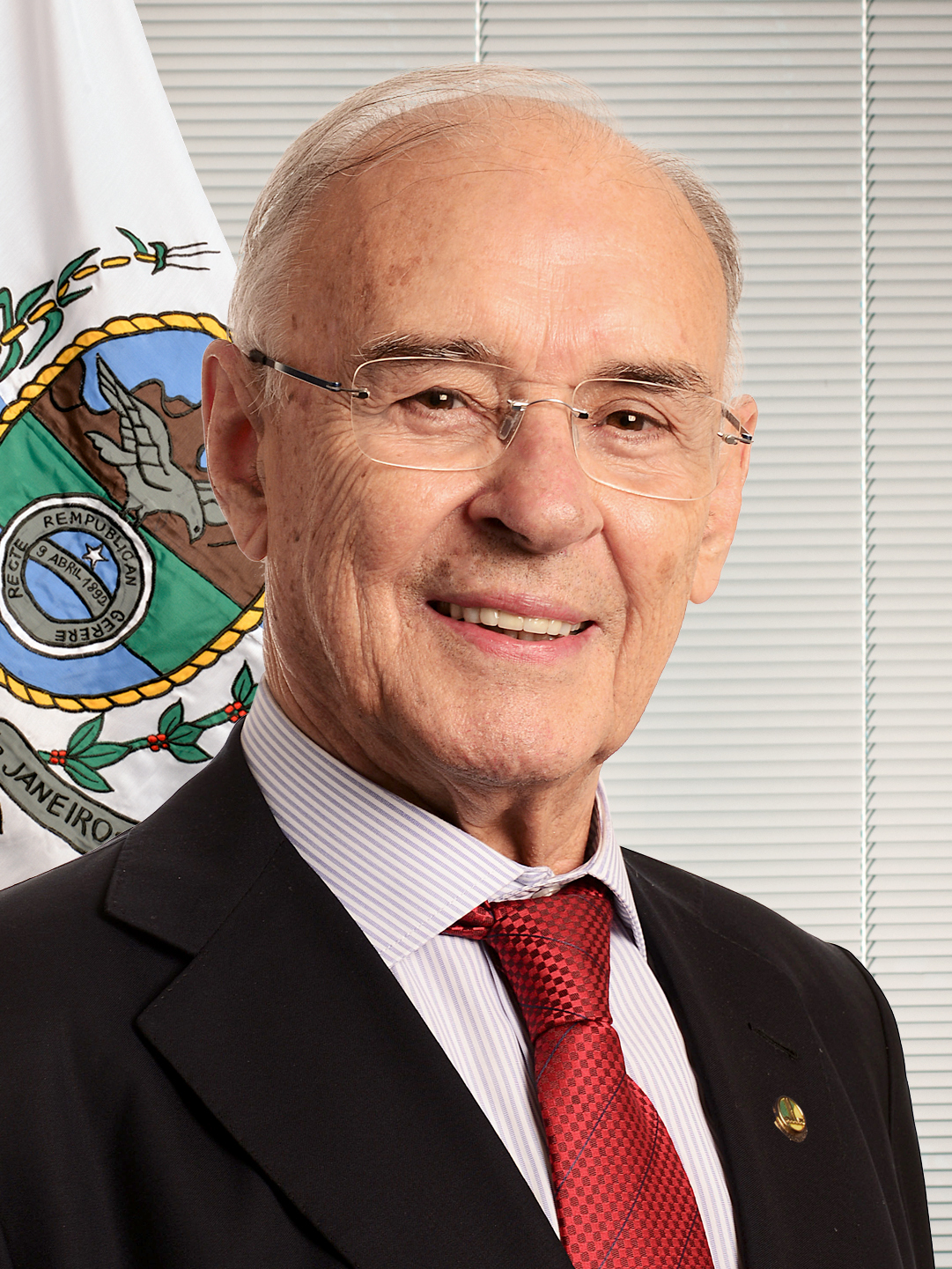
- Official portrait

Senator for Rio de Janeiro
- In office 1 February 2019 – 21 October 2020
- Preceded by: Eduardo Lopes
- Succeeded by: Carlos Portinho

Member of the Chamber of Deputies
- In office 29 November 2016 – 1 February 2019
- Constituency: Rio de Janeiro
- In office 31 October 2008 – 6 February 2015
- Constituency: Rio de Janeiro
- In office 6 April 2006 – 19 October 2006
- Constituency: Rio de Janeiro
- In office 28 February 1984 – 23 October 2002
- Constituency: Rio de Janeiro

Personal details
- Born: 11 March 1937 São Luiz Gonzaga, Rio Grande do Sul, Brazil
- Died: 21 October 2020 (aged 83) Rio de Janeiro, Rio de Janeiro, Brazil
- Cause of death: Organ failure caused by COVID-19
- Party: PDS (1980–86); DEM (1986–2011); PSD (2011–17; 2018–20); PSC (2017–2018)
- Occupation: Politician, army captain
- Profession: Engineer, economist

Military service
- Allegiance: Brazil
- Branch/service: Brazilian Army
- Rank: Captain

Arolde de Oliveira (11 March 1937 – 21 October 2020) was a Brazilian soldier, economist and politician. Although born in Rio Grande do Sul, he spent his political career representing Rio de Janeiro, having served as federal deputy for nine consecutive terms from 1986 to 2019 and federal senator from 2019 until he died of COVID-19 in October 2020.

== Early life and education ==
Born to Horácio de Oliveira and Margarida Barbosa Gonçalves, Oliveira was the oldest of six children. Born in São Luiz Gonzaga to a poor family, Oliveira moved to Porto Alegre to attend high school, and then stayed in the city to attend military school. He then moved to Resende in the state of Rio de Janeiro to attend Agulhas Negras Military Academy.

== Career ==
Oliveira attained the rank of captain in the military, and afterwards remained in the state of Rio de Janeiro, where he briefly worked as an economist and engineer before entering politics.

In 1983, Oliveria received a temporary appointment to a seat in the Chamber of Deputies. In 1986 he was elected on his own right and was re-elected eight times. In 2014, his last election to the Chamber of Deputies, he received 55,380 votes, as the PSD candidate.

In the National Constitutional Assembly (1987-1988) he was the President of the sub-commission on Science technology and Communications.

He was the municipal Secretary for Transportation for Rio de Janeiro from October 2002 to October 2008 during the administration of Mayor Cesar Maia.

During his time in Congress, Oliveira was a member of the evangelical block, and he fiercely defended socially conservative beliefs. He was an opponent of legalized abortion, legalized drugs, gambling, and gender theory. In January 2015 he became Secretary of Work and Income for the State of Rio Janeiro. Oliveira voted in favor of the impeachment against then-president Dilma Rousseff. Oliveira voted in favor of the 2017 labor reform, and would later back Rousseff's successor Michel Temer against a similar impeachment motion. In 2017 he switched parties, joining the Christian Social Party PSC, but switched back to PSD in 2018.

In the 2018 elections, Oliveira was the Social Democratic Party's candidate for senate in the State of Rio de Janeiro. During the campaign he received the Support of Jair Bolsonaro (PSL), who asked his supporters to vote for both his son Flávio Bolsonaro and Oliveira for Senate. Oliveira was elected to the Senate with 2,382,265 (17.06% of all valid votes). Oliveira was sworn in on February 1, 2019.

In the 2018 election, Oliveira was one of 6 new evangelical and Protestant politicians elected to the federal senate. Oliveira was strongly opposed to communism and same-sex marriage.

== Personal life ==
Oliveira met his future wife Yvelise while stationed in Resende, with whom he has two children.

Oliveira was a devout Baptist who had campaigned for evangelical issues while in office. Because of his faith, Oliveira was opposed to same-sex marriage.

Oliveira died on 21 October 2020, due to complications from COVID-19 during the COVID-19 pandemic in Brazil, at the Samaritan Hospital in Rio de Janeiro. Oliveira had previously stated that social isolation was "useless" and had defended the controversial usage of Chloroquine to treat the disease.
