= Mattos Nascimento =

Brazilian musician

- Born: 2 June 1954 (age 72)
- Origin: Brazil
- Genres: Gospel, pentecostal, soul
- Occupations: Singer, songwriter, composer, trombonist
- Instruments: vocal, trombone
- Years active: 1989–present
- Labels: Mattos Nascimento Discos, Nancel Produções, Avance Music (2024-atualmente)
- Website: mattosnascimento.com.br

Mattos Nascimento (born 2 June 1954) is a Brazilian musician, singer, composer and trombonist. In the 1980s he used to perform with the famous Brazilian band Os Paralamas do Sucesso. Since he became a follower of Jesus Christ on 19 November 1989 he's been dedicating himself exclusively to a solo career, recording dozens of albums. He has his own music label called "Mattos Nascimento Discos" and was the pioneer in his family to get into the gospel music scene.

== Discography ==
- Oh Glória!
- Rei dos reis
- Especial Ao Vivo
- Céu de Luz
- Você já Imaginou?
- Jesus é o Rei
- Muito Feliz
- Sou vencedor
- In Concert (vol 1 & 2)
- Parece até um Sonho
- À Sombra do Onipotente Descansará
- Levanta a Bandeira
- Jesus tem Misericórdia
- Jesus Salva e dá Vitória
- Jesus de Nazaré
- Jesus El Nazareno
- Vem
- Liberdade
- Harpa Cristã vol. 1
- Harpa Cristã vol. 2
- Na Unção do primeiro amor
- Em Àguas Profundas
- Canções Imortais
- As primeiras canções
- Grite para Todo Mundo Ouvir
- Arma Poderosa
- Inéditas – Ao Vivo
- Grite para todo o mundo ouvir
- Filho Pródigo
