= Pedro Fernandes Neto (politician) =

Brazilian politician (born 1983)

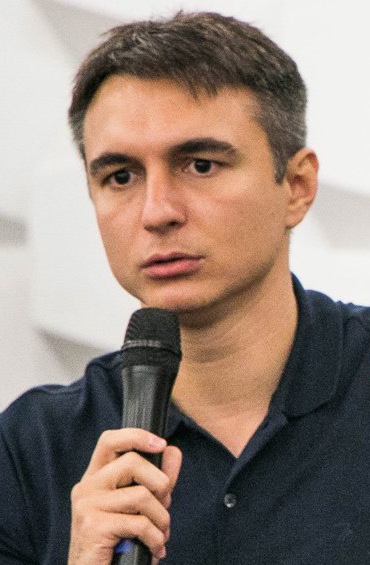

Member of the Legislative Assembly of Rio de Janeiro
- In office 1 February 2007 – 31 December 2018

Personal details
- Born: 22 April 1983 (age 43)
- Party: Podemos (since 2023)
- Relatives: Pedro Fernandes (grandfather)

Pedro Fernandes Neto (born 22 April 1983) is a Brazilian politician. From 2007 to 2018, he was a member of the Legislative Assembly of Rio de Janeiro. In the 2018 gubernatorial election, he was a candidate for governor of Rio de Janeiro. He failed to make the runoff. He is the grandson of Pedro Fernandes.
