= Ministry of Culture (Brazil) =

Federal ministry of Brazil

- Portuguese: Ministério da Cultura
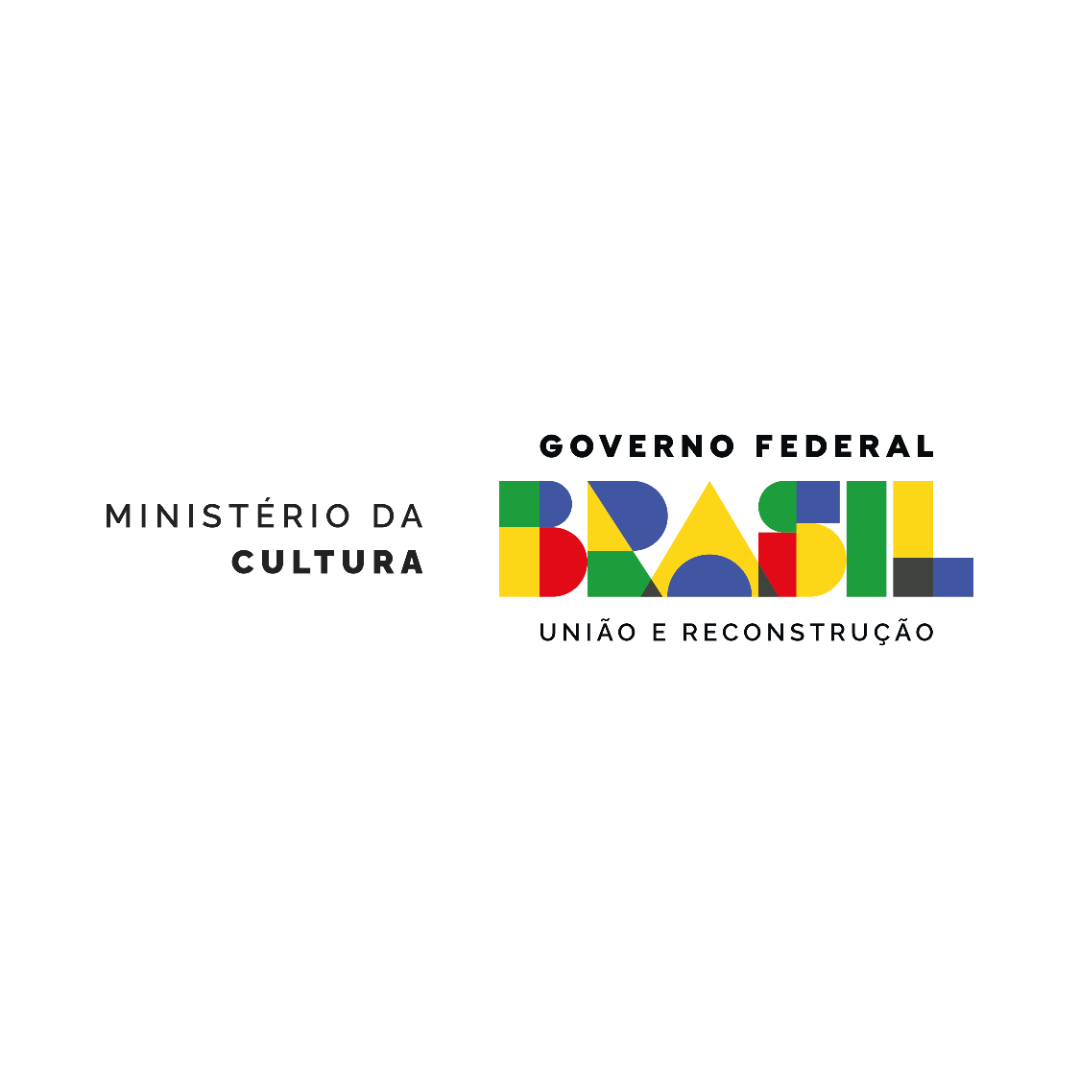

Agency overview
- Formed: 15 March 1985; 40 years ago
- Type: Ministry
- Jurisdiction: Federal government of Brazil
- Headquarters: Esplanada dos Ministérios, Bloco B Brasília, Federal District
- Annual budget: $6.3 b BRL (2023)
- Agency executives: Margareth Menezes, Minister; Márcio Tavares, Executive-Secretary; Marcos Alves de Souza, Secretary of Copyright and Intellectual Property; Henilton Parente, Secretary of Creative Economy and Cultural Promotion; Fabiano Piúba, Secretary of Graduation, Book and Reading; Joelma Gonzaga, Secretary of Audiovisual; Roberta Martins, Secretary of Culture Committees; Márcia Rollemberg, Secretary of Citizenship and Cultural Diversity
- Website: www.gov.br/cultura/

The Ministry of Culture of Brazil (Portuguese: Ministério da Cultura, MinC) is a cabinet-level federal ministry created in 1985, in the first month of president's José Sarney government, dissolved by Jair Bolsonaro in 2019 and reinstated by Luiz Inácio Lula da Silva in 2023.

== Dissolution and reinstatement ==
In April 1990, it was dissolved by president Fernando Collor de Mello and transformed into a Culture Secretary, directly linked to the presidency. This situation was reverted two years later, but, in the meantime, in 1991, the law called popularly Lei Rouanet was created by the secretary of Culture, Sérgio Paulo Rouanet. It is a law that allows companies and individuals to sponsor cultural products, up to respectively 4% and 6% of their income tax. It is a law of incentive to the culture, the most important instrument of the ministry, frequently contested.

In 1999, president Fernando Henrique Cardoso expanded the scope of the law, with more financial resources and a reorganization of its structure. Again, in 2003, president Luiz Inácio Lula da Silva restructured the ministry.

The Ministry of Culture was dissolved again on 12 May 2016 by the acting president of Brazil, Michel Temer. Its functions were merged into a new Ministry of Education and Culture. The dissolution of the ministry immediately sparked protests in numerous Brazilian cities, and included the occupation of the Gustavo Capanema Palace in Rio de Janeiro, and National Foundation of the Arts (FUNARTE) offices in Belo Horizonte, Brasília and São Paulo. Artists such as the singer Otto and Arnaldo Antunes participated in the protests. The Ministry of Culture was reinstated by the Temer government on 23 May 2016, dissolved by Jair Bolsonaro in his first day of presidency and reinstated by the Lula administration in 2023.

== Structure ==
=== Secretariats and departments ===
- Secretariat of Citizenship and Cultural Diversity
- Secretariat of the Culture Committees
- Copyright and Intellectual Property Office
- Secretariat of Creative Economy and Cultural Promotion
- Secretariat of Education, Books and Reading
- Audiovisual Secretariat

=== Foundations ===
- Casa de Rui Barbosa Foundation (FCRB)
- Palmares Cultural Foundation (FCP)
- National Arts Foundation (Funarte)
- National Library Foundation (BN)
- Brazilian Center for Educational Television Foundation (FUNTEVE)

=== Local authorities ===
- Institute of National Historical and Artistic Heritage (IPHAN)
- National Cinema Agency (Ancine)
- Brazilian Institute of Museums (IBRAM)

=== Collegiate bodies ===
- National Culture Fund Commission (CFNC)
- National Culture Incentive Commission (CNIC)
- National Cultural Policy Council (CNPC)

=== Bodies linked to the Audiovisual Secretariat ===
- Audiovisual Technical Center (CTAV)
- Brazilian Cinematheque

== See also ==
- Federal institutions of Brazil
- Minister of Culture (Brazil)
