= 2024 Rio de Janeiro municipal election =

Municipal election in Brazil

- 6 October 2024
- Mayoral election
- Opinion polls
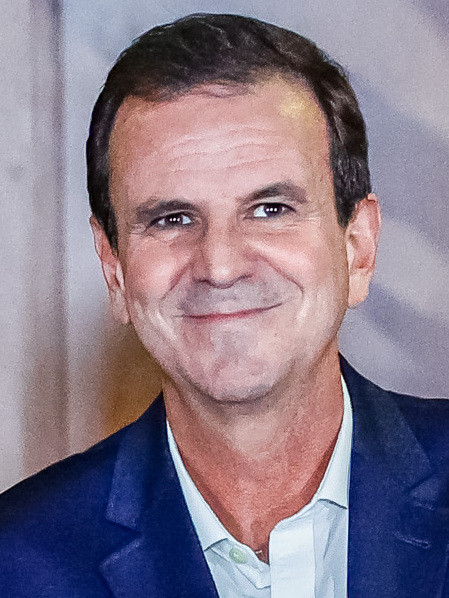

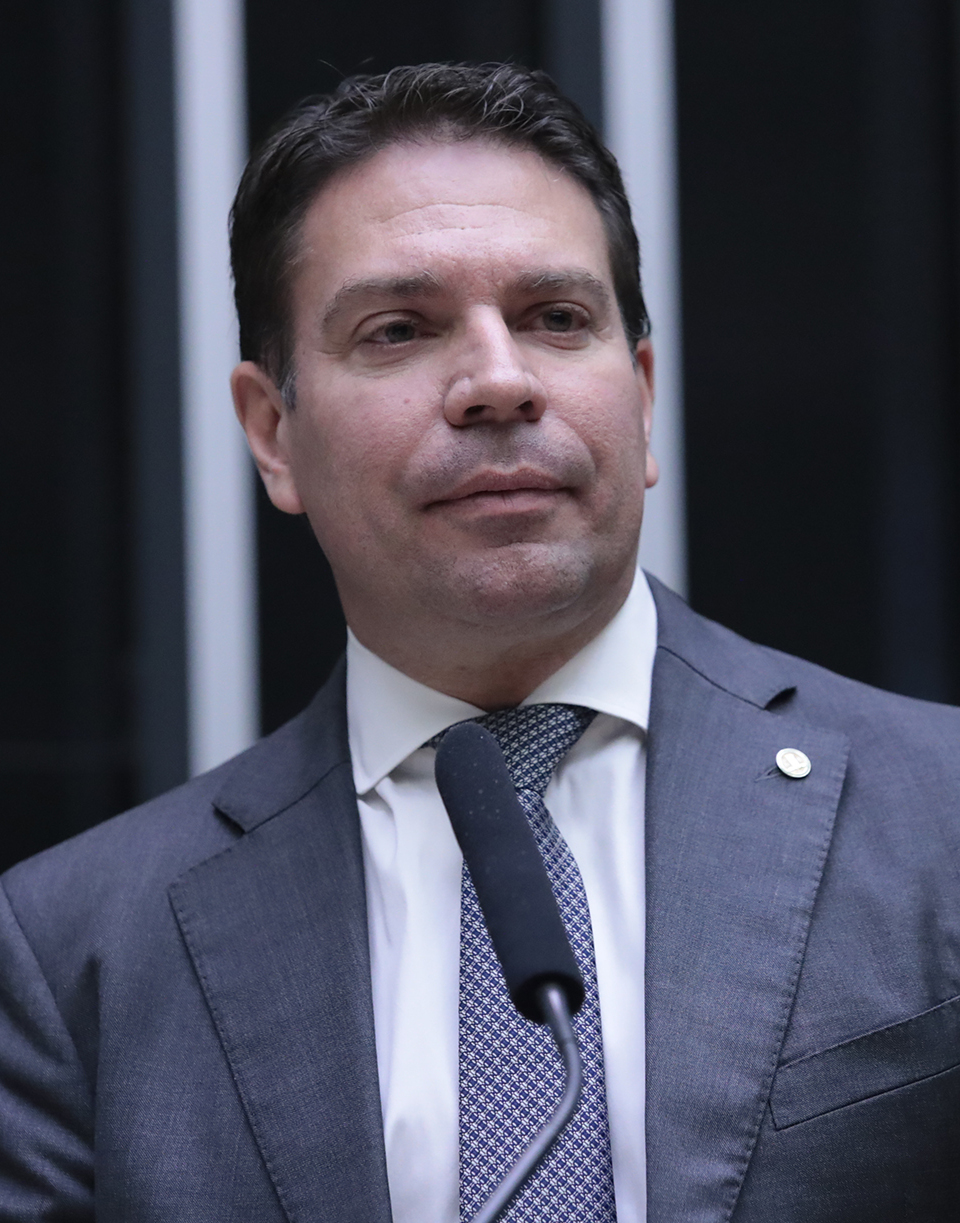
Candidate	Eduardo Paes	Alexandre Ramagem
Party	PSD	PL
Alliance	It's Rio Moving Forward	Courage to Change
Running mate	Eduardo Cavaliere	Índia Armelau
Popular vote	1,861,856	948,631
Percentage	60.47%	30.81%
- Winner by electoral zone Paes 50-59% Paes 60-69% Paes 70-79%
Mayor before election
Eduardo Paes
PSD
Elected mayor
Eduardo Paes
PSD
- Parliamentary election
Party	Leader	Vote %	Seats	+/–
Municipal Chamber
PSD	Marcio Ribeiro		16	+13
PL	Carlos Bolsonaro		7	+5
FE Brasil	Tainá De Paula		5	+2
PSOL-REDE	Rick Azevedo		4	−3
Republicanos	Tânia Bastos		3	−1
PP	Leniel Borel		3	+3
MDB	Vitor Hugo		3	+2
PODE	Marcos Dias		2	+2
PRD	Jair Da M. Gomes		1	−1
DC	Willian Coelho		1	0
PDT	Welington Dias		1	0
NOVO	Pedro Duarte		1	+1
PSDB-Cidadania	Talita Galhardo		1	−2
PSB	Tatiana Roque		1	+1
Solidarity	Dr Gilberto		1	0
UNIÃO	Jorge Canella		1	−7
This lists parties that won seats. See the complete results below.

The 2024 Rio de Janeiro municipal election took place on 6 October 2024. Voters elected a mayor, vice mayor, and 51 city council members. The incumbent mayor, Eduardo Paes of the Social Democratic Party (PSD), was reelected with his second term to begin on 1 January 2025 and end on 31 December 2028.

== Background ==
=== 2020 election ===
The last mayoral election in Rio de Janeiro, held in 2020, resulted in a largest victory of Eduardo Paes (DEM) in the second round. Paes obtained 1,629,319 votes (64.07% of the valid votes), while his opponent and former mayor Marcelo Crivella obtained 913,700 votes (or circa of 35.93% of the valid votes). Crivella attempted his own re-election and lost by a difference of 28 points.

An opinion poll conducted by Paraná Pesquisas in November 2023 asked Rio's citizens what they thought of Paes' government. His approval rate was 59.6% and those who disapproved of his management of the city were 35.3%.

== Electoral calendar ==
Electoral calendar announced by the Superior Electoral Court (TSE) on 3 January 2024
7 March – 5 April	Period of the 'party window' for councillors. During this period, the councillors are able to move to other political parties in order to run for election while not losing their respective political terms.
6 April	Deadline for all parties and party federations to obtain the registration of their statutes at the Superior Electoral Court and for all candidates to have their electoral domicile in the constituency in which they wish to contest the elections with the affiliation granted by the party.
15 May	Start of the preliminary fundraising campaign in the form of collective financing for potential candidates. During this period, candidates are not allowed to ask for votes and are still subjected to obey the rules regarding electoral propaganda on the Internet.
20 July – 5 August	On this date, party conventions begin to deliberate on coalitions and choose candidates for mayors and councillors tickets. Parties have until 15 August to register their names with the Brazilian Election Justice.
16 August	Beginning of electoral campaigns on an equal basis, with any advertising or demonstration explicitly requesting for votes before the date being considered irregular and subject to fines.
30 August –3 October	Broadcasting of free electoral propaganda on radio and television.
6 October	Date of mayoral elections.
27 October	Date of a possible second round in cities with more than 200,000 voters in which the most voted candidate for mayor has not reached 50% of the valid votes.

== Candidates ==
=== Confirmed candidates ===
Party	Mayoral candidate		Vice mayoral candidate (Note: Same party as the mayoral candidate, unless mentioned in parentheses)	Coalition	Ref.
Progressistas (PP 11)		Marcelo Queiroz: Federal Deputy (2023–present); State Deputy (2018–2019); Councillor (2013–2017)	Teresa Bergher (PSDB): Councillor (2017–present)	The Rio Has a Option: Progressistas (PP); Always Forward (PSDB, Cidadania)	
United Socialist Workers' Party (PSTU 16)	Cyro Garcia	Cyro Garcia: Federal Deputy (1992–1993)	Paula Falcão: Women's Rights Activist; Leader of the collective group Women in Struggle Movement	—N/a	
Liberal Party (PL 22)		Alexandre Ramagem: Federal Deputy (2023–present); Director of the Brazilian Intelligence Agency (2019–2022)	Índia Armelau: State Deputy (2023–present)	Courage to Change: Liberal Party (PL); Brazilian Democratic Movement (MDB); Republicanos	
Workers' Cause Party (PCO 29)		Henrique Simonard: Editor of the Workers' Cause Newspaper	Caetano Sigiliano: University Student	—N/a	
New Party (NOVO 30)	Carol Sponza	Carol Sponza: Lawyer and Master in Public Policies	Alexandre Popó: Businessman	—N/a	
Brazil Union (UNIÃO 44)		Rodrigo Amorim: State Deputy (2019–present)	Fred Pacheco (MOBILIZA): State Deputy (2023–present)	Strength to Change: Brazil Union (UNIÃO); National Mobilization (MOBILIZA); Brazilian Labour Renewal Party (PRTB)	
Socialism and Liberty Party (PSOL 50)		Tarcísio Motta: Federal Deputy (2023–present); Councillor (2017–2023)	Renata Souza: State Deputy (2019–present)	The Rio Deserves Much More: PSOL REDE Federation (PSOL, REDE); Brazilian Communist Party (PCB)	
Social Democratic Party (PSD 55)		Eduardo Paes: Mayor of Rio de Janeiro (2021–present, 2009–2017); Federal Deputy (1999–2006); Councillor (1997–1999)	Eduardo Cavaliere: State Deputy (2023–present)	It's Rio Moving Forward: Social Democratic Party (PSD); Democratic Labour Party (PDT); Brazilian Socialist Party (PSB); Brazil of Hope (PT, PCdoB, PV); Avante; Solidariedade; Act (AGIR); Podemos (PODE); Democratic Renewal Party (PRD); Christian Democracy (DC)	
Popular Unity (UP 80)		Juliete Pantoja: Teacher and Population Educator	Vinícius Benevides: Activist of the Movement for Struggle in Neighborhoods, Towns and Favelas	—N/a	

=== Withdrawn candidates ===
- Martha Rocha (PDT) – State Deputy of Rio de Janeiro (2015–present). She announced her support to Paes' reelection bid on 28 March 2024.
- Flávio Bolsonaro (PL) – State Deputy of Rio de Janeiro (2003–2019) and Senator for Rio de Janeiro (2019–present).
- Pedro Duarte (NOVO) – Councillor of Rio de Janeiro (2021–present). He'll run for re-election as a councillor in a decision taken along with his party.
- Otoni de Paula (MDB) – Federal Deputy from Rio de Janeiro (2019–present) and Councillor of Rio de Janeiro (2017–2019); he withdrew his candidacy on 14 June 2024 to take over the campaign coordination of Eduardo Paes with the Evangelical Christians.
- Dani Balbi (PCdoB) – State Deputy of Rio de Janeiro (2023–present). The Communist Party of Brazil withdrew her candidacy in order to support Paes' campaign.
- Cabo Daciolo (Republicanos) – Federal Deputy from Rio de Janeiro (2015–2019). His candidacy was withdrawn on 31 July 2024 as his party decided to support Alexandre Ramagem's candidacy.

== Outgoing Municipal Chamber ==
The result of the last municipal election and the current situation in the Municipal Chamber is given below:

Affiliation	Members		+/–
Affiliation	Elected	Current (Note: Between March and April 2024, councilors were able to change parties during the so-called "party window" without losing their respective terms.)	+/–
PSD	3	13	▲10
PSOL	7	6	▼1
MDB	1	5	▲4
PT	3	4	▲1
Republicanos	7	4	▼3
UNIÃO	didn't exist	3	▲3
PP	2	3	▲1
PL	2	3	▲1
PDT	1	2	▲1
PRD	didn't exist	1	▲1
PSDB	0	1	▲1
PV	0	1	▲1
NOVO	1	1	Steady
Solidarity	1	1	Steady
Agir	1	1 (Note: The Christian Labor Party (PTC) changed its name to Agir (Act) in March 2022.)	Steady
DC	1	1	Steady
MOBILIZA	1	1 (Note: The National Mobilization Party (PMN) changed its name to National Mobilization (MOBILIZA) in December 2023.)	Steady
PODE	1	0	▼1
PROS	1	extinct party (Note: The Republican Party of the Social Order (PROS) merged into Solidariedade in February 2023.)	▼1
Patriota	1	extinct party (Note: Brazilian Labour Party (PTB) and Patriota merged into the Democratic Renewal Party (PRD) in November 2023.)	▼1
PSL	1	extinct party (Note: Democrats (DEM) and the Social Liberal Party (PSL) merged into the Brazil Union in February 2022.)	▼1
Cidadania	2	0	▼2
PTB	2	extinct party (Note: Brazilian Labour Party (PTB) and Patriota merged into the Democratic Renewal Party (PRD) in November 2023.)	▼2
PSC	2	extinct party (Note: The Social Christian Party (PSC) merged into Podemos in June 2023.)	▼2
Avante	3	0	▼3
DEM	7	extinct party (Note: Democrats (DEM) and the Social Liberal Party (PSL) merged into the Brazil Union in February 2022.)	▼7
Total	51		

== Opinion polls ==
=== First round ===
2024

Pollster/client(s)	Date(s) conducted	Sample size	Paes PSD	Ramagem PL	Motta PSOL	Queiroz PP	Garcia PSTU	Amorim UNIÃO	Sponza NOVO	Pantoja UP	Simonard PCO	Others	Abst. Undec.	Lead
Datafolha	3–4 September	1,106	59%	11%	6%	1%	1%	2%	1%	1%	0%	—N/a	18%	48%
Real Time Big Data	30–31 August	1,000	58%	14%	8%	1%	1%	2%	1%	0%	0%	—N/a	15%	44%
30 August			Beginning of the period of electoral propaganda on radio and television.											
Quaest	25–27 August	1,140	60%	9%	5%	1%	3%	1%	1%	1%	0%	—N/a	19%	51%
Quaest	25–27 August	1,140	26%	5%	1%	—N/a	—N/a	—N/a	—N/a	—N/a	—N/a	—N/a	68%	21%
Datafolha	20–21 August	1,106	56%	9%	7%	2%	2%	3%	1%	1%	0%	—N/a	18%	47%
Datafolha	20–21 August	1,106	32%	6%	2%	—N/a	—N/a	—N/a	—N/a	—N/a	—N/a	4%	57%	26%
Futura/100% Cidades	6–11 August	1,000	61.2%	9.9%	5%	0.2%	1.5%	1.9%	0.3%	0.5%	0.1%	4.8% (Note: Cabo Daciolo (Republicanos))	14.6%	51.3%
Futura/100% Cidades	6–11 August	1,000	49.8%	10.1%	8.3%	1%	7.9%	3.7%	0.5%	0.9%	—N/a	—N/a	17.8%	39.7%
Atlas/Intel	2–7 August	1,600	45.8%	32.3%	12.9%	1.4%	0.7%	1.2%	2.6%	0.3%	0%	—N/a	2.7%	13.5%
Prefab Future	30 July	1,004	43.6%	6.9%	4%	2.3%	2.1%	1.7%	0.8%	0.6%	0%	—N/a	38%	36.7%
Prefab Future	30 July	1,004	70.3%	11.1%	6.5%	3.7%	3.4%	2.7%	1.3%	1%	0%	—N/a	(Note: Valid votes)	59.2%
30 July			Cabo Daciolo's candidacy (Republicanos) is withdrawn by his party in support of Alexandre Ramagem's (PL) candidacy.											
Pollster/client(s)	Date(s) conducted	Sample size	Paes PSD	Ramagem PL	Motta PSOL	Garcia PSTU	Amorim UNIÃO	Pantoja UP	Queiroz PP	Sponza NOVO	Simonard PCO	Others	Abst. Undec.	Lead
Agência de Notícias das Favelas (ANF)	25–27 July	774 (Note: Electoral survey conducted with residents of the Rio de Janeiro communities (South Zone, North Zone, West Zone, and Central Zone))	40%	4%	4%	3%	1%	1%	1%	—N/a	—N/a	2% (Note: Dani Balbi (PCdoB))	44%	36%
Quaest	19–22 July	1,104	49%	13%	7%	3%	3%	2%	2%	1%	0%	—N/a	19%	36%
Quaest	19–22 July	1,104	52%	14%	10%	—N/a	3%	—N/a	2%	—N/a	—N/a	—N/a	19%	38%
16 July			Dani Balbi's candidacy is withdrawn by the Communist Party of Brazil (PCdoB) in order to support Paes' reelection bid.											
Pollster/client(s)	Date(s) conducted	Sample size	Paes PSD	Ramagem PL	Motta PSOL	Daciolo Republicanos	Amorim UNIÃO	Sponza NOVO	Garcia PSTU	Queiroz PP	Balbi PCdoB	Others	Abst. Undec.	Lead
Datafolha	2–4 July	840	53%	7%	9%	—N/a	2%	0%	3%	2%	1%	3% (Note: Juliete Pantoja (UP))	19%	44%
Datafolha	2–4 July	840	55%	7%	10%	—N/a	—N/a	1%	4%	—N/a	—N/a	3%	20%	45%
Futura/100% Cidades	20–26 June	1,000	51.6%	8.4%	6.1%	—N/a	1.4%	0.3%	1.4%	0.6%	0.6%	3.8% (Note: Otoni de Paula (MDB) with 2.4%; Juliete Pantoja (UP) with 0.7% and Henrique Simonard (PCO) with 0.7%)	25.8%	43.2%
Quaest	13–16 June	1,145	51%	11%	8%	—N/a	4%	—N/a	—N/a	2%	—N/a	—N/a	24%	40%
Quaest	13–16 June	1,145	47% (Note: If endorsed by president Lula (PT))	29% (Note: If endorsed by former president Jair Bolsonaro (PL))	5%	—N/a	1%	—N/a	—N/a	—N/a	—N/a	—N/a	17%	18%
14 June			Otoni de Paula withdraws his candidacy and joins Eduardo Paes' campaign.											
11 May–5 June			Pedro Duarte withdraws his potential candidacy to run for his reelection bid as a councillor of Rio de Janeiro. Carol Sponza is announced as a potential mayoral candidate of the New Party (NOVO). Cabo Daciolo is announced as a potential mayoral candidate of the Republicans.											
Pollster/client(s)	Date(s) conducted	Sample size	Paes PSD	Ramagem PL	Motta PSOL	Otoni MDB	Amorim UNIÃO	Duarte NOVO	Garcia PSTU	Queiroz PP	Balbi PCdoB	Others	Abst. Undec.	Lead
Paraná Pesquisas	24–29 April	800	46.1%	13.6%	7.4%	3%	2.1%	1.6%	4.5%	1.9%	2.8%	—N/a	17%	32.5%
Paraná Pesquisas	24–29 April	800	46.8%	15.6%	8.1%	—N/a	—N/a	—N/a	5.1%	2.8%	3.4%	—N/a	18.3%	31.2%
Prefab Future	27–28 April	1,019	35%	3.2%	5.4%	3.1%	2.5%	1.2%	0.8%	2.6%	—N/a	—N/a	46.2%	29.6%
Prefab Future	27–28 April	1,019	65.1%	6%	10%	5.8%	4.6%	2.2%	1.5%	4.8%	—N/a	—N/a	(Note: Valid votes)	55.1%
Atlas Intel	18–23 April	1,239	42.6%	31.2%	12.7%	2.3%	—N/a	3.8%	—N/a	0.5%	1.3%	—N/a	5.5%	11.4%
Futura/100% Cidades	11–22 April	1,000	44.1%	9%	7.8%	3.4%	1%	0.9%	2.4%	0.8%	0.4%	5% (Note: Martha Rocha (PDT))	25.1%	35.1%
Futura/100% Cidades	11–22 April	1,000	42.2%	—N/a	7.2%	3.5%	—N/a	0.8%	—N/a	—N/a	1.3%	26% (Note: Flávio Bolsonaro (PL))	19%	16.2%
Futura/100% Cidades	11–22 April	1,000	48.6%	10.2%	9.8%	—N/a	—N/a	1.4%	—N/a	—N/a	1.7%	—N/a	28.3%	38.4%
Prefab Future	1–2 April	1,005	38.2%	3.9%	7.9%	3.4%	1.7%	1.4%	0.7%	3%	—N/a	—N/a	39.8%	30.3%
28 March			Martha Rocha announces her support to Paes' reelection, along with the Democratic Labour Party (PDT).											
Pollster/client(s)	Date(s) conducted	Sample size	Paes PSD	Ramagem PL	Motta PSOL	Otoni MDB	Amorim UNIÃO	Duarte NOVO	Garcia PSTU	Queiroz PP	Balbi PCdoB	Others	Abst. Undec.	Lead
Real Time Big Data	22–23 March	1,000	40%	13%	9%	6%	4%	2%	2%	1%	0%	8% (Note: Martha Rocha (PDT))	15%	27%

2023

Pollster/client(s)	Date(s) conducted	Sample size	Paes PSD	Ramagem PL	Motta PSOL	Rocha PDT	Otoni MDB	Amorim PRD	Freixo PT	Molon PSB	Queiroz PP	Duarte NOVO	Others	Abst. Undec.	Lead
AtlasIntel	25–30 December	800	36.2%	19.1%	17.8%	—N/a	6.9%	—N/a	—N/a	—N/a	—N/a	2.5%	—N/a	17.4%	17.1%
Paraná Pesquisas	17–20 November	810	44.4%	9.6%	7.2%	8.1%	—N/a	2.7%	—N/a	5.4%	0.9%	—N/a	—N/a	21.6%	34.8%
Paraná Pesquisas	17–20 November	810	43.1%	9.4%	6.8%	7.5%	4.2%	2.3%	—N/a	5.2%	0.9%	—N/a	—N/a	20.6%	33.7%
1 November			Former president of Brazil Jair Bolsonaro (PL) nominates Alexandre Ramagem (PL) as a potential candidate for mayor in the 2024 elections.												
Pollster/client(s)	Date(s) conducted	Sample size	Paes PSD	Portinho PL	Motta PSOL	Rocha PDT	Otoni MDB	Amorim PTB	Freixo PT	Luizinho PP	Pampolha UNIÃO	Duarte NOVO	Others	Abst. Undec.	Lead
Prefab Future	18–20 August	1,000	34.8%	1.1%	10.1%	—N/a	6.1%	—N/a	—N/a	2.1%	2.6%	3.1%	—N/a	44.8%	24.7%
Prefab Future	18–20 August	1,000	32.2%	0.8%	8.9%	—N/a	5.2%	2.4%	—N/a	—N/a	—N/a	2.2%	1.3% (Note: Indio da Costa (UNIÃO))	47%	23.3%
Gerp	9–14 August	600	31%	—N/a	—N/a	—N/a	—N/a	—N/a	10%	—N/a	—N/a	—N/a	10% (Note: Walter Braga Netto (PL) with 10%)	49%	21%
31 May			Flávio Bolsonaro withdraws his potential candidacy for mayor in the 2024 elections.												
Pollster/client(s)	Date(s) conducted	Sample size	Paes PSD	Flávio PL	Motta PSOL	Rocha PDT	Crivella Republicanos	Pazuello PL	Renata PSOL	Luizinho PP	Pampolha UNIÃO	Alencar PSOL	Others	Abst. Undec.	Lead
Brasmarket	17–19 April	1,100	25.4%	16.9%	6.2%	—N/a	—N/a	—N/a	—N/a	2.1%	—N/a	—N/a	4.6% (Note: Otoni de Paula (MDB))	44.9%	8.5%
Brasmarket	17–19 April	1,100	25.4%	16.5%	5.7%	4.5%	—N/a	1.6%	—N/a	1.3%	—N/a	—N/a	10.6% (Note: Bandeira de Mello (PSB) with 6.5% and Otoni de Paula (MDB) with 4.1%)	35.3%	8.9%
Brasmarket	17–19 April	1,100	27.6%	18.5%	6.5%	—N/a	2.5%	—N/a	—N/a	—N/a	—N/a	—N/a	—N/a	37.3%	9.1%
Brasmarket	17–19 April	1,100	26.7% (Note: If endorsed by president Lula (PT).)	26.8% (Note: If endorsed by his father and former president Jair Bolsonaro (PL).)	4.9% (Note: If endorsed by the federal deputy Guilherme Boulos (PSOL).)	6% (Note: If endorsed by Ciro Gomes (PDT).)	4.7% (Note: If endorsed by former president Jair Bolsonaro (PL).)	—N/a	—N/a	—N/a	—N/a	—N/a	—N/a	30.8%	0.1%
Prefab Future	27–29 March	1,565	34.5%	—N/a	4.1%	—N/a	—N/a	—N/a	—N/a	2.1%	2.6%	—N/a	3.9% (Note: Otoni de Paula (MDB))	52.8%	30.4%
Prefab Future	27–29 March	1,565	31.4%	4.5%	4%	3.6%	—N/a	1.1%	—N/a	2.1%	2.2%	—N/a	5.6% (Note: Bandeira de Mello (PSB) with 2.9% and Otoni de Paula (MDB) with 2.7%)	45.5%	26.9%
Paraná Pesquisas	2–5 March	1,000	35.5%	22.1%	7.1%	—N/a	—N/a	—N/a	—N/a	3%	2.4%	—N/a	8.5% (Note: Lindbergh Farias (PT) with 5.9% and Otoni de Paula (MDB) with 2.6%)	21.4%	13.4%
Paraná Pesquisas	2–5 March	1,000	37.2%	23.3%	9.5%	—N/a	—N/a	—N/a	—N/a	3.2%	—N/a	—N/a	3% (Note: Otoni de Paula (MDB))	23.8%	13.9%
Paraná Pesquisas	2–5 March	1,000	34.4%	—N/a	7.6%	—N/a	—N/a	—N/a	—N/a	2.9%	2.7%	—N/a	24.9% (Note: Romário (PL) with 14.3%; Lindbergh Farias (PT) with 5.4% and Otoni de Paula (MDB) with 5.2%)	27.5%	20.1%
Instituto Rio21	9–12 January	1,476	31.3%	27.7%	11.84%	5.88%	4.06%	—N/a	—N/a	—N/a	—N/a	—N/a	—N/a	19.21%	3.6%
Instituto Rio21	9–12 January	1,476	33.8%	—N/a	—N/a	7.13%	4.65%	26.13%	7.76%	—N/a	—N/a	—N/a	—N/a	20.46%	7.67%
Instituto Rio21	9–12 January	1,476	30.24%	—N/a	—N/a	7.51%	—N/a	—N/a	—N/a	13.62%	2.93%	12.63%	—N/a	33.77%	16.62%
Instituto Rio21	9–12 January	1,476	27.1%	—N/a	—N/a	7.05%	—N/a	—N/a	—N/a	13.52%	—N/a	—N/a	27.92% (Note: Marcelo Freixo (PT) with 14.52% and Carlos Portinho (PL) with 13.4%)	24.44%	12.58%
Instituto Rio21	9–12 January	1,476	34.14%	—N/a	—N/a	8.24%	—N/a	—N/a	—N/a	—N/a	—N/a	—N/a	21.01% (Note: Rodrigo Amorim (PTB) with 7.41%; Clarissa Garotinho (UNIÃO) with 7.37% and Talíria Petrone (PSOL) with 6.23%)	36.58%	25.9%
Instituto Rio21	9–12 January	1,476	33.3%	—N/a	—N/a	9.18%	—N/a	—N/a	—N/a	—N/a	—N/a	—N/a	18.28% (Note: Clarissa Garotinho (UNIÃO) with 7.72%; Tainá de Paula (PT) with 5.94% and Alexandre Freitas (PODE) with 4.62%)	39.21%	24.15%

=== Second round ===
Eduardo Paes and Alexandre Ramagem

Pollster/client(s)	Date(s) conducted	Sample size	Paes PSD	Ramagem PL	Abst. Undec.	Lead
Real Time Big Data	30–31 August 2024	1,000	60%	25%	15%	35%
Datafolha	20–21 August 2024	1,106	68%	18%	14%	50%
Atlas/Intel	2–7 August 2024	1,600	57.5%	36%	6.5%	21.5%
Quaest	19–22 July 2024	1,104	62%	25%	13%	37%
Futura/100% Cidades	20–26 June 2024	1,000	63.8%	20.1%	16.1%	43.7%
Quaest	13–16 June 2024	1,145	57%	27%	16%	30%
Atlas Intel	18–23 April 2024	1,239	51%	36.7%	12.3%	14.3%
Real Time Big Data	22–23 March 2024	1,000	55%	29%	16%	26%

Eduardo Paes and Tarcísio Motta

Pollster/client(s)	Date(s) conducted	Sample size	Paes PSD	Motta PSOL	Abst. Undec.	Lead
Datafolha	20–21 August 2024	1,106	62%	21%	17%	41%
Atlas/Intel	2–7 August 2024	1,600	47.8%	26%	26.2%	21.8%
Quaest	19–22 July 2024	1,104	57%	24%	19%	33%
Futura/100% Cidades	20–26 June 2024	1,000	61.9%	17.6%	20.5%	44.3%
Atlas Intel	18–23 April 2024	1,239	50.3%	21%	28.7%	29.3%
Real Time Big Data	22–23 March 2024	1,000	64%	20%	16%	44%

Hypothetical scenario with Martha Rocha

Eduardo Paes and Martha Rocha (withdrawn)

Pollster/client(s)	Date(s) conducted	Sample size	Paes PSD	Rocha PDT	Abst. Undec.	Lead
Real Time Big Data	22–23 March 2024	1,000	58%	27%	15%	31%

Hypothetical scenario with Flávio Bolsonaro (withdrawn)

Eduardo Paes and Flávio Bolsonaro (withdrawn)

Pollster/client(s)	Date(s) conducted	Sample size	Paes PSD	Flávio PL	Abst. Undec.	Lead
Futura/100% Cidades	11–22 April 2024	1,000	53.8%	32%	14.2%	21.8%

=== Rejection of candidates ===
In some opinion polls, the interviewee can choose more than one alternative (the so-called "multiple rejection"), therefore, the sum of the percentages of all candidates can exceed 100% of the votes in some scenarios.

Pollster/client(s)	Date(s) conducted	Sample size	Paes PSD	Motta PSOL	Ramagem PL	Garcia PSTU	Queiroz PP	Amorim UNIÃO	Pantoja UP	Simonard PCO	Sponza NOVO	Could vote in anyone	Others	Abst. Undec.
Quaest	25–27 August 2024	1,140	26%	38%	27%	43%	26%	23%	12%	11%	8%	—N/a	—N/a	—N/a
Datafolha	20–21 August 2024	1,106	19%	22%	23%	24%	15%	16%	14%	14%	16%	8% (Note: 3% of respondents said they would vote for either candidate, and 5% said they would not vote for either candidate.)	—N/a	11%
Futura/100% Cidades	6–11 August 2024	1,000	14.7%	24%	—N/a	25%	—N/a	—N/a	24%	—N/a	—N/a	—N/a	28.6% (Note: Cabo Daciolo (Republicanos))	—N/a
Prefab Future	30 July 2024	1,004	17.6%	10.4%	10.4%	10.3%	4.5%	3.3%	2.2%	1.5%	1.4%	9.1%	—N/a	29.3%
30 July 2024			Cabo Daciolo's candidacy (Republicanos) is withdrawn by his party in support of Alexandre Ramagem's (PL) candidacy.											
14 June–16 July 2024			Otoni de Paula withdraws his candidacy and joins Eduardo Paes' campaign. Dani Balbi's candidacy is withdrawn by the Communist Party of Brazil (PCdoB) in order to support Paes' election bid.											
11 May–5 June 2024			Pedro Duarte withdraws his potential candidacy to run for his re-election bid as a councillor of Rio de Janeiro. Carol Sponza is announced as the mayoral candidate of the New Party (NOVO). Cabo Daciolo is announced as a potential mayoral candidate of the Republicans.											
Pollster/client(s)	Date(s) conducted	Sample size	Paes PSD	Ramagem PL	Motta PSOL	Otoni MDB	Amorim UNIÃO	Duarte NOVO	Garcia PSTU	Queiroz PP	Balbi PCdoB	Could vote in anyone	Others	Abst. Undec.
Paraná Pesquisas	24–29 April 2024	800	25.4%	18.3%	14.1%	8.4%	11.4%	8.8%	23.4%	11.5%	8.9%	—N/a	—N/a	15%
Prefab Future	27–28 April 2024	1,019	22%	4.5%	9.1%	2%	2.6%	2.6%	10.3%	2.7%	—N/a	12%	—N/a	32.2%
Prefab Future	1–2 April 2024	1,005	16.4%	3.6%	6.4%	3.3%	1.6%	1%	9%	2.7%	—N/a	19.6%	—N/a	36.4%
1 November 2023–28 March 2024			Former president of Brazil Jair Bolsonaro (PL) nominates Alexandre Ramagem (PL) as a potential candidate for mayor in the 2024 elections.Martha Rocha announces her support to Paes' reelection, along with the Democratic Labour Party (PDT).											
Pollster/client(s)	Date(s) conducted	Sample size	Paes PSD	Portinho PL	Motta PSOL	Luizinho PP	Pampolha UNIÃO	Otoni MDB	Duarte NOVO	Amorim PTB	Queiroz PP	Could vote in anyone	Others	Abst. Undec.
Prefab Future	18–20 August 2023	1,000	20%	3.8%	10.9%	—N/a	—N/a	4.5%	1.9%	2.6%	—N/a	15.7%	10% (Note: Indio da Costa (UNIÃO))	30.6%
31 May 2023			Flávio Bolsonaro withdraws his potential candidacy for mayor in the 2024 elections.											
Pollster/client(s)	Date(s) conducted	Sample size	Paes PSD	Flávio PL	Motta PSOL	Luizinho PP	Pampolha UNIÃO	Otoni MDB	Duarte NOVO	Amorim PTB	Queiroz PP	Could vote in anyone	Others	Abst. Undec.
Prefab Future	27–29 March 2023	1,565	19.4%	35%	6.3%	1.4%	1.7%	1%	—N/a	—N/a	—N/a	4.9%	6.3% (Note: Eduardo Pazuello (PL) with 2.4%; Martha Rocha (PDT) with 2.3% and Bandeira de Mello (PSB) with 1.6%)	24%

== Results ==
=== Mayor ===
Candidate	Running mate	Party	Votes	%
Eduardo Paes (incumbent)	Eduardo Cavaliere	Social Democratic Party	1,861,856	60.47
Alexandre Ramagem	Índia Armelau	Liberal Party	948,631	30.81
Tarcísio Motta	Renata Souza	Socialism and Liberty Party	129,344	4.20
Marcelo Queiroz	Teresa Bergher (PSDB)	Progressistas	74,996	2.44
Rodrigo Amorim	Fred Pacheco (MOBI)	Brazil Union	34,117	1.11
Carol Sponza	Alexandre Popó	New Party	20,351	0.66
Juliete Pantoja	Vinicius Benevides	Popular Unity	6,828	0.22
Cyro Garcia	Paula Falcão	United Socialist Workers' Party	2,453	0.08
Henrique Simonard	Caetano Albuquerque	Workers' Cause Party	595	0.02
Total			3,079,171	100.00
Valid votes			3,079,171	88.55
Invalid votes			245,618	7.06
Blank votes			152,491	4.39
Total votes			3,477,280	100.00
Registered voters/turnout			5,009,373	69.42
PSD hold				

Popular vote (first round)
Paes	60.47%
Ramagem	30.81%
Others	8.72%

=== Municipal Chamber ===
Party or alliance		Votes	%	Seats	+/–
Social Democratic Party		771,360	25.74	16	▲13
Liberal Party		418,668	13.97	7	▲5
Brazil of Hope	Workers' Party	207,581	6.93	4	▲1
Brazil of Hope	Green Party	23,424	0.78	1	▲1
Brazil of Hope	Communist Party of Brazil	11,561	0.39	0	Steady
PSOL REDE; Federation	Socialism and Liberty Party	207,380	6.92	4	▼3
PSOL REDE; Federation	Sustainability Network	13,323	0.44	0	Steady
Progressistas		173,627	5.79	3	▲1
Brazilian Democratic Movement		169,904	5.67	3	▲2
Republicans		154,544	5.16	3	▼4
Solidariedade		99,799	3.33	1	Steady
Podemos		98,405	3.28	2	▲1
Brazil Union		92,833	3.10	1	New
Democratic Renewal Party		82,802	2.76	1	New
Democratic Labour Party		76,273	2.55	1	Steady
New Party		72,577	2.42	1	Steady
Brazilian Socialist Party		62,812	2.10	1	▲1
Agir		54,598	1.82	0	▼1
Christian Democracy		52,332	1.75	1	Steady
PSDB Cidadania; Federation	Brazilian Social Democracy Party	37,460	1.25	1	▲1
PSDB Cidadania; Federation	Cidadania	11,290	0.38	0	▼2
National Mobilization		36,095	1.20	0	▼1
Avante		33,339	1.11	0	▼3
Brazilian Woman's Party		23,022	0.77	0	Steady
Popular Unity		7,289	0.24	0	Steady
United Socialist Workers' Party		2,138	0.07	0	Steady
Brazilian Communist Party		2,010	0.07	0	Steady
Workers' Cause Party		344	0.01	0	Steady
Total		2,996,790	100.00	51	–
Valid votes		2,996,790	86.18		
Invalid votes		272,902	7.85		
Blank votes		207,588	5.97		
Total votes		3,477,280	100.00		
Registered voters/turnout		5,009,373	69.42		

==== Members elected ====
Candidate	Party	%	Votes
Carlos Bolsonaro	PL	4.30	130,480
Marcio Ribeiro	PSD	1.87	56,770
Tainá de Paula	PT	1.65	49,986
Carlo Caiado	PSD	1.57	47,671
Rafael Aloisio Freitas	PSD	1.35	40,892
Marcelo Diniz	PSD	1.32	39,967
Rosa Fernandes	PSD	1.31	39,804
Leniel Borel	PP	1.13	34,359
Felipe Michel	PP	1.05	31,773
Joyce Trindade	PSD	1.00	30,466
Cesar Maia	PSD	0.98	29,665
Rick Azevedo	PSOL	0.97	29,364
Tadeu Amorim Junior	PSD	0.95	28,743
Helena Vieira	PSD	0.94	28,626
Vera Lins	PP	0.92	27,871
Diego Vaz	PSD	0.90	27,226
Salvino Oliveira	PSD	0.89	27,062
Mônica Benício	PSOL	0.84	25,382
Felipe Boró	PSD	0.80	24,190
Zico	PSD	0.77	23,319
Fabio Poubel	PL	0.70	21,379
Marcio Santos	PV	0.70	21,122
Vitor Hugo	MDB	0.68	20,660
Tânia Bastos	Republicanos	0.67	20,424
Talita Galhardo	PSDB	0.67	20,352
Luiz Ramos Filho	PSD	0.67	20,237
Welington Dias	PDT	0.66	20,147
William Siri	PSOL	0.66	19,872
Jorge Canella	UNIÃO	0.64	19,353
Átila Nunes	PSD	0.63	19,191
Inaldo Silva	Republicanos	0.63	19,116
Willian Coelho	DC	0.62	18,777
Flávio Valle	PSD	0.61	18,613
Adejair Aguiar	PRD	0.61	18,509
Thais Ferreira	PSOL	0.57	17,206
Tatiana Roque	PSB	0.56	16,957
Renato Moura	MDB	0.54	16,278
Marcos Dias	PODE	0.53	16,209
Rogerio Amorim	PL	0.53	16,081
Paulo Messina	PL	0.53	15,977
Fabio Silva	PODE	0.52	15,846
Pedro Duarte	NOVO	0.51	15,404
Felipe Pires	PT	0.50	15,136
Maíra Marinho	PT	0.48	14,667
Fernando Armelau	PL	0.48	14,415
Rodrigo Vizeu	MDB	0.47	14,351
Rafael Satiê	PL	0.45	13,582
Gigi Castilho	Republicanos	0.44	13,492
Leonel Querino Neto	PT	0.44	13,325
Gilberto Lima	Solidarity	0.44	13,312
Diego Faro	PL	0.42	12,675
