= Luciana Novaes =

Brazilian social worker and politician (1983–2026)

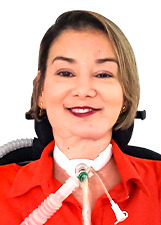
- Novaes in 2022

City Councilmember of the Municipal Chamber of Rio de Janeiro
- In office 1 January 2017 – 31 December 2020
- In office 2 February 2023 – 30 March 2026

Personal details
- Born: Luciana Gonçalves de Novaes; 5 June 1983 Nilópolis, Rio de Janeiro, Brazil
- Died: 27 April 2026 (aged 42) Rio de Janeiro, Rio de Janeiro, Brazil
- Party: Workers' Party (PT)
- Occupation: Social worker
- Profession: Politician
- Website: https://luciananovaes.com.br/

Luciana Gonçalves de Novaes (5 June 1983 – 27 April 2026) was a Brazilian social worker and politician affiliated with the Workers' Party (PT) who was elected three times as a city councillor in Rio de Janeiro; she was known for her legislative work on behalf of people with disabilities (PWDs).

== Background ==
Born in Nilópolis in the Baixada Fluminense region of Rio de Janeiro, at the age of 19, while studying nursing at Estácio de Sá University, on the Rio Comprido campus in downtown Rio de Janeiro, on 5 May 2003, she was struck in the face by a stray bullet during a break between classes; the bullet hit her jaw and destroyed the third vertebra of her spine, leaving her tetraplegic and dependent on mechanical ventilation.

Doctors told the family that she had a 1% chance of survival and that she would probably never leave hospital. She spent 21 months in hospital following the tragedy, 18 of which were in the intensive care unit (ICU). She underwent seven operations. Estácio de Sá University was ordered by the Rio de Janeiro Court of Justice to pay Luciana and her family compensation amounting to 600,000 reais.

Novaes returned to school five years later, in 2008, and earned her bachelor’s degree in Social Work in 2012. She also completed a master’s degree in Public Administration.

Her case was the subject of an episode of TV Globo’s true crime show Linha Direta, titled Above Suspicion, which explored the uncertainty surrounding who fired the shot that wounded her.

== Political career ==
Novaes began her political career whilst she was still in hospital, where she helped collect signatures from relatives of other victims of violence in order to press for changes to the Penal Code of Brazil.

In 2012, Luciana Novaes stood as a candidate for city councillor for the Workers' Party (PT), receiving 8,284 votes, which were insufficient for her to be elected. In 2014, she stood as a candidate for the state legislature, receiving 10,918 votes, once again insufficient for her election. The following year, in 2013, she began working at the General Coordination Office for Human Rights, a department within the Municipal Secretariat for Social Development of the City of Rio de Janeiro.

In 2016, she stood for election again as a city councillor, receiving 16,679 votes and being elected for the first time. She was the city’s first councillor with paraplegia. To enable her to carry out her duties, Municipal Chamber of Rio de Janeiro had to carry out accessibility works, such as installing ramps to allow the new councillor and her wheelchair to access the building. However, the reception area at the Pedro Ernesto Palace would only be adapted three years later. During her first term, she helped draft 115 bills, of which 51 were passed.

In the following election, in 2020, she stood for re-election, but was unsuccessful; she received 15,311 votes and was placed on the reserve list. In 2022, she stood as a candidate for the federal Chamber of Deputies. She was subjected to sexual harassment whilst campaigning in the city of Niterói. She received 31,052 votes, which were insufficient for her to be elected. In 2024, she stood for election to the City Council again, receiving 11,994 votes and becoming the first substitute for the coalition comprising the PT, the Green Party (PV) and the Communist Party of Brazil (PCdoB). When Councillor Tainá de Paula moved to the Municipal Department of the Environment, she was called upon to fill the vacancy.

Luciana Novaes served as chair of the Chamber’s Committee on the Rights of Persons with Disabilities and was the author of several laws in this field, such as Law 8 781/2025, which establishes Rio’s Municipal Policy on Accessible Routes to facilitate travel for people with disabilities, those with reduced mobility, and the elderly. Her work also extended to the state level, having contributed to a report used by the Public Prosecutor’s Office of the State of Rio de Janeiro in a Public Civil Action against SuperVia, with the aim of carrying out accessibility works at train stations in the metropolitan area.

I entered politics because, unfortunately, people with disabilities aren’t very visible, and the lack of accessibility in the city is still a huge problem.

== Personal life and death ==
Luciana was the youngest of four siblings, the daughter of a retired bus driver and a retired school cook from Nilópolis, a town in the Baixada Fluminense region. Luciana lived in Recreio dos Bandeirantes with her mother and sister, a neighborhood in the western part of Rio. She was a Botafogo FRfan.

On 27 April 2026, Luciana Novaes died following a intracranial aneurysm, having been admitted in December 2025 due to health complications.

The Mayor of Rio, Eduardo Cavaliere (PSD), declared three days of official mourning. Her death was mourned by the president of the Rio de Janeiro City Council, Councilman Carlo Caiado (PSD), as well as politicians Marcelo Freixo (PT), Benedita da Silva (PT), Tarcísio Motta (PSOL), and Eduardo Paes (PSD), André Ceciliano (PT), Cesar Maia (PSD) and YouTuber Felipe Neto.

== Electoral performance ==
Year	Election	Office	Party	Votes	%	Result	Ref.
2012	Rio de Janeiro municipal	City Councillor	PT	8,284	0.27%	Not elected	
2014	Rio de Janeiro state	State Deputy	PT	10,918	0.14%	Not elected	
2016	Rio de Janeiro municipal	City Councillor	PT	16,679	0.57%	Elected	
2020	Rio de Janeiro municipal	City Councillor	PT	15,311	0.58%	Alternate (Took office on 2 February 2023)	
2022	Rio de Janeiro state	State Deputy	PT	31,052	0.36%	Not elected	
2024	Rio de Janeiro municipal	City Councillor	PT	11,994	0.40%	Alternate (Took office on 2 January 2025)	
