= Dani Balbi =

Brazilian politician and academic (born 1989)

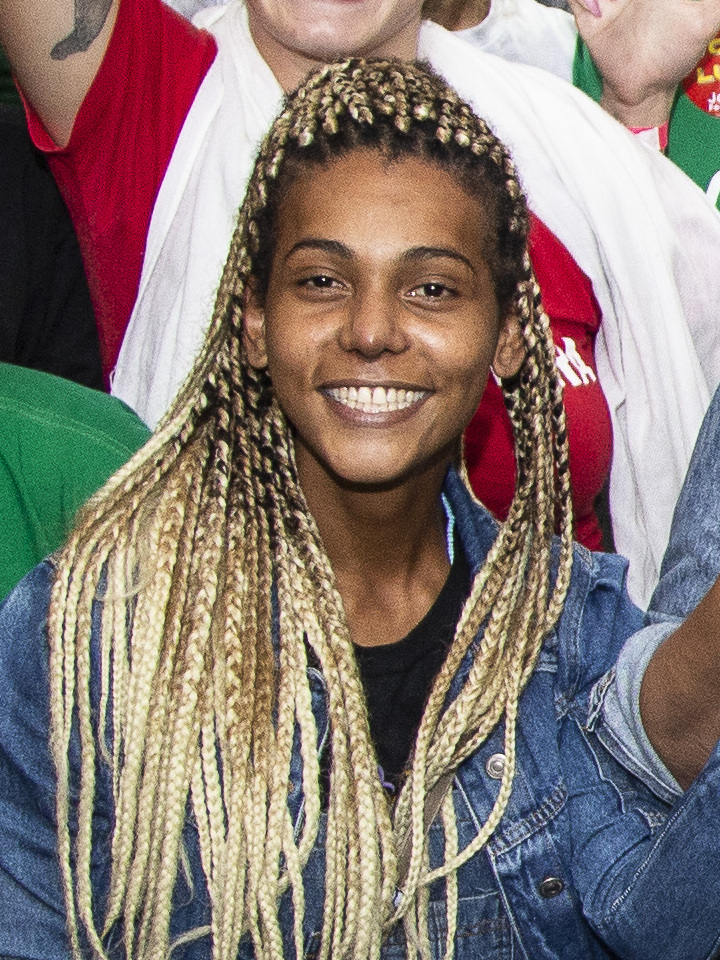

State deputy in the Legislative Assembly of Rio de Janeiro
- Incumbent
- Assumed office 2022

Personal details
- Born: Danieli Christovão Balbi; 3 April 1989 (age 37) Engenho da Rainha, Rio de Janeiro, Brazil
- Party: Communist Party
- Education: Federal University of Rio de Janeiro (UFRJ)

Danieli Christovão Balbi, better known as Dani Balbi (born 1989), is a Brazilian university professor, screenwriter, and politician representing the Communist Party of Brazil (PCdoB). She was elected state deputy for Rio de Janeiro state in the 2022 elections, becoming the first transgender parliamentarian in the state's legislative assembly.

== Early life and education ==
Balbi was born on 3 April 1989 in Engenho da Rainha, a neighbourhood in the North Zone of the city of Rio de Janeiro. She obtained a bachelor's degree in Portuguese literature in 2010 and a master's in the same subject in 2013. She completed a doctorate in the science of literature in 2019, with a scholarship from the National Council for Scientific and Technological Development. Her areas of study included linguistics, literature, and arts and she was also involved in the production of videos and television programmes, sound recording and music editing. All her studies were at the Federal University of Rio de Janeiro (UFRJ), where she became the first transgender person to be awarded a doctorate.

== Academic career ==
Balbi works as a professor of communication, Brazilian reality and cinema at the School of Communication at UFRJ.

== Political career ==
An activist from the age of 14, when she joined efforts to protect free education, which was under threat, Balbi joined the Communist Party at the age of 16 and later became part of the national leadership of the party. She has participated in student struggles, the black movement and women's movements and is a strong supporter of LGBT+ rights and public education.

In 2022 she was elected to the Rio de Janeiro Legislative Assembly (Alerj), becoming the first transgender deputy in the history of the assembly, winning 0.76% of the valid votes. In the assembly, she was elected as president of the Labour, Legislation and Social Security Committee. She works closely with the Central dos Trabalhadores e Trabalhadoras do Brasil (CTB), a national labour union. Among legislation she has proposed is that 3% of places in the state's universities should be set aside for the transsexual and transvestite population. On 28 June 2023, International LGBTQIA+ Pride Day, the state assembly building was lit with the Rainbow Flag on her initiative. One of her main concerns is to address the high level of violence against transgender people, with around 130 murders being reported in 2022.

In October 2023 she was unanimously chosen as the PCdoB candidate for the Rio de Janeiro mayoral election in October 2024, where she was expected to be the only woman in the race.
