= Cyro Garcia =

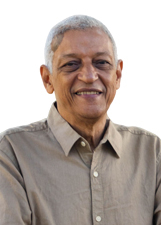

Federal deputy of Rio de Janeiro
- In office 14 October 1992 – 20 August 1993
- Preceded by: Jamil Haddad

Personal details
- Born: 26 October 1954 (age 71) Manhumirim, Minas Gerais, Brazil
- Party: PT (1980–1994); PSTU (1994–present)
- Education: Federal University of Rio de Janeiro; Fluminense Federal University
- Occupation: banker, historian, teacher, socialist activist, politician

Cyro Garcia (born 26 October 1954) is a Brazilian former bank teller, historian, teacher, socialist activist, and politician. A long time member of the United Socialist Workers' Party (PSTU), he served as a federal deputy from the state of Rio de Janeiro from 1992 to 1993.

== Biography ==
Garcia was born on 26 October 1954 in Manhumirim, in the state of Minas Gerais, to Josias Garcia da Silva and Donatilla de Souza Garcia. He graduated with a law degree from the Federal University of Rio de Janeiro Faculty of Law. He later earned his master's degree and doctorate in history from Fluminense Federal University.

Garcia was one of the founding members of the Workers' Party (PT) and the Central Única dos Trabalhadores (CUT), where he helped to direct both during the 1980s, and later led the Banker's Union of Rio de Janeiro. He became a federal deputy for ten months as he was elected as a substitute for Jamil Haddad. He was later expelled from the PT and broke off from CUT.

He would become a member of the PSTU, of which he has been a member of since its founding in 1994. One of its national directors, along with Zé Maria, the national president, Garcia is also currently the president of the party's Rio de Janeiro state branch, as well as a member of CSP-Conlutas. He is a defender of a socialism based on the principals espoused by Lenin and Trotsky.

He ran to become a federal deputy for the state of Rio de Janeiro in 2006, but obtained only 19,180 votes and was not elected. He also attempted to run for governor in 2010, obtaining more than 48,000 votes. He again would run in 2016 to become the mayor of Rio de Janeiro, obtaining 5,759 votes, or 0.19% of the vote. He was the second least voted for candidate in that election, behind only Thelma Bastos of the PCO, who had her candidacy barred by the election courts.

During the 2018 elections, Garcia was the PSTU's candidate to become a senator for Rio de Janeiro as part of the PSTU. His candidacy was announced during a state convention of the PSTU on 2 August 2018. Teacher and 2002 vice-presidential candidate Dayse Oliveira was their candidate to become the state's governor. Garcia received 45,588 votes (or 0.33% of the vote share).

It was announced on 24 July 2024 that Garcia would run for office again, this time to become the mayor of the city of Rio de Janeiro. He received 2,453 votes, or 0.08% of the vote.

== See also ==
- LIT-QI
- IV Internacional
