= Durandé =

Brazilian municipality

Coordinates: 20°12′S 41°48′W

- Municipality
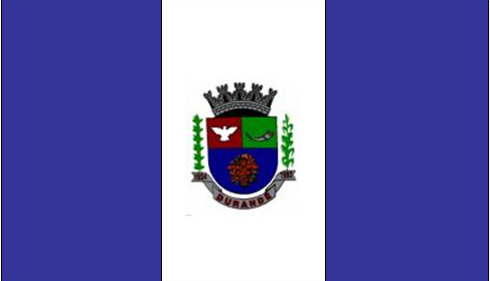
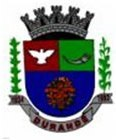
- Flag Coat of arms
- Interactive map of Durandé
- Country: Brazil
- State: Minas Gerais
- Region: Southeast
- Time zone: UTC−3 (BRT)

Location of Durandé within Minas Gerais

Durandé is a Brazilian municipality located in the state of Minas Gerais. The city belongs to the mesoregion of Zona da Mata and to the microregion of Manhuaçu. Districts within the county are St. John Figueira and São José da Figueira.

== History ==
Dores do Rio José Pedro was a settlement in the municipality of Manhumirim, elevated to district in 1877. In 1890 the police station was elevated to the category of District of peace and in 1928 transferred its district headquarters to the town of Durandé.

== Population ==
In the year 2000, Durandé had a population of 7,005. Its estimated population in 2004 was 7,596 inhabitants. The population count conducted by IBGE in April 2007, however, found 6,932 inhabitants, as published in the Official Gazette in October 2007. By 2010, the total population increased to 7,402. Men numbered 3,761 and there were 3,641 females counted. Areas considered urban accounted for 3,530 people, while 3,872 lived in rural areas. As of 2020, the estimated population was 7,870.

== Cultural events ==
Durandé holds a Café festival on 20 September, with agricultural exhibitions, a milk competition, motocross, shows, rodeos, parades, auctions, a volleyball tournament, a rustic race and other cultural activities.

== See also ==
- List of municipalities in Minas Gerais
