= Pedro Ernesto =

Brazilian surgeon and politician (1884–1942)

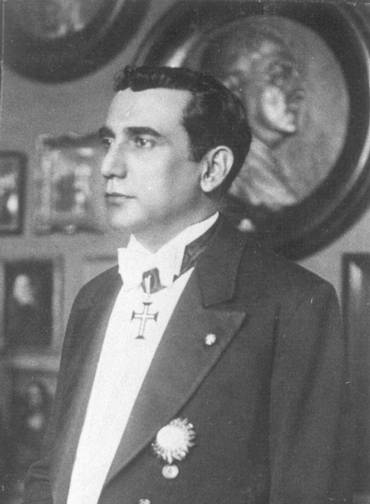
- Pedro Ernesto do Rego Baptista
- Born: 25 September 1884; Recife, Pernambuco
- Died: 10 August 1942 (aged 57); Rio de Janeiro, Rio de Janeiro
- Occupations: Physician and politician

Pedro Ernesto do Rego Baptista (25 September 1884 – 10 August 1942) was a medical surgeon who became mayor of Rio de Janeiro in mid-1931. His two terms were from 30 September 1931 to 2 October 1934; and from 7 April 1935 to 4 April 1936.

== Biography ==
Pedro Ernesto would later be known as the first Populist Brazilian politician. His victory in the elections for mayor was partly due to the backing of then-president of Brazil, Getúlio Vargas. During his term in office, he made several social and populist reforms in the fields of health care, education, and indigenous culture (to his credit stands the revival of the Samba).

He quickly became the most popular politician in Brazil, and was even considered as a suitable candidate for the future presidential elections of 1938.

In 1936, however, Ernesto was charged with participation in a communist conspiracy against the government, and was arrested. He spent the next few years defending himself against charges of treason, and was eventually absolved. By then, however, Vargas had already launched his autocratic "New State" (Estado Novo), erasing the possibility of democratic elections.

== Pedro Ernesto Medal ==
In October 1980, the Municipal Chamber of Rio de Janeiro, whose building is called "Pedro Ernesto Palace", instituted a medal with his name, considered the maximum commendation of the municipality.

It was severely questioned in 2006, after the ex-deputy Roberto Jefferson, confessed defendant and impeached for participating in the "mensalão scandal", was decorated with it by his own daughter, councilor Cristiane Brasil. The cartoonist "Jaguar" returned his medal, given eight years earlier by the then councilman Chico Alencar.
