= Índia Armelau =

Brazilian swimmer and politician

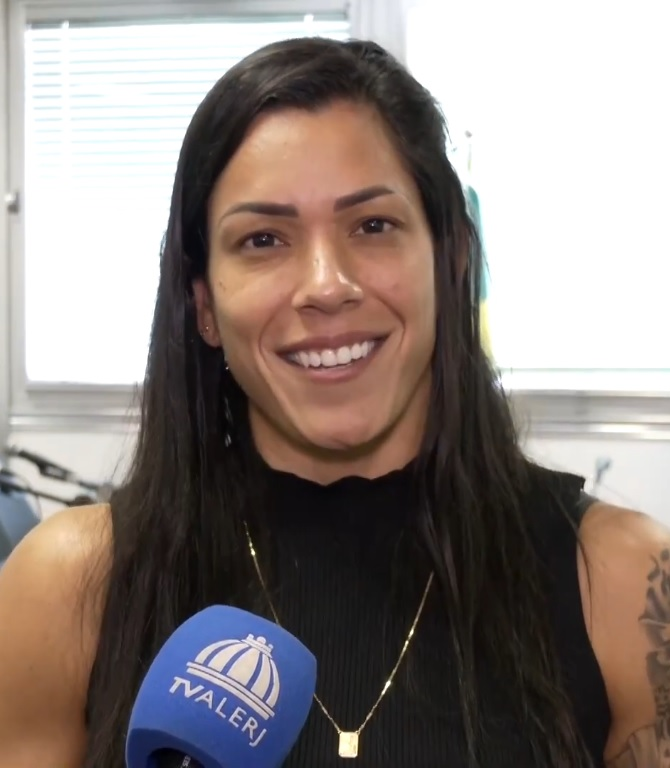

State deputy of Rio de Janeiro
- Incumbent
- Assumed office 1 February 2023

Personal details
- Born: 20 January 1988 (age 38) Manaus, Amazonas, Brazil
- Party: PL (2022–present)

Amanda Brandão Armelau, better known as Índia Armelau (born 20 January 1988), is a Brazilian former swimmer and politician, affiliated with the Liberal Party (PL). She is currently a state deputy in the state of Rio de Janeiro, being the first Indigenous woman elected to the chamber.

In 2022, she was elected for her first mandate to the legislative assembly with 57,582 votes.

== Biography ==
Armelau is of Indigenous and Italian background. She was raised in the Aparecida neighborhood of Manaus, in Amazonas state, where she began her career as a swimmer at Academia Golfinho. She was at one point invited to become part of the swimming team of Atlético Rio Negro Clube.

=== Swimming career ===
Armelau competed in base categories with CR Vasco da Gama, in Rio de Janeiro, having taken part as a member of a youth team that won state championships. As an adult, she was a member of São Paulo-based Universidade Santa Cecília's (Unisanta) swim team.

According to World Aquatics, she participated in seven tryouts for the World Aquatics Championships between 2004 and 2006. Her best result was in the 50 meter butterfly, earning sixth place twice.

Armelau participated in the Brazil Swimming Trophy competition in 2005, with a third place in the 200m freestyle and the 4x50m freestyle. Later that same year, at the José Finkel Trophy competition, she came in second place at the 100m medley, losing to Rebeca Gusmão; and also came in third place at the 100m butterfly and second place at the 4 × 100 m medley. She helped to bring Unissanta to second place in the competition overall.

She competed in the 2006 Copa Latina in São Paulo, having achieved a gold medal with the 4 × 100 m freestyle and silver during the 50m butterfly event.

=== Post-sports career ===
Armelau ended her career as an athlete in 2008 and began studying to become licensed as a teacher, graduating with a bachelor's degree in physical education. She participated in the "Musa do Cariocão 2012" contest, promoted by the CNT program Balanço Esportivo, representing Vasco da Gama. She went on to become a businesswoman in the fitness industry, being the owner of a CrossFit training center.

=== Political career ===
Armelau became known for her posts relating to politics on social media, criticizing the Workers' Party. She became a member of the PL and was elected a state deputy in the state of Rio de Janeiro in 2022, with 57,582 votes.

As a state deputy, she approved a law that instituted 31 July as "Vira-Lata day" on the official calendar of the state of Rio de Janeiro, with the objective of promoting the adoption of pets that aren't purebred. In January 2024, she presented an amendment to taxes to put 815 million reais towards infrastructure projects and the purchasing of air conditioning for state schools.

In February 2024, she voted in favor of allowing fellow deputy Lucinha to keep her position after she had been removed from office by the state, having been accused of having links to the militias.

During the 2024 Rio de Janeiro mayoral election, she was chosen to be the vice-mayoral pick for the ticket led by Alexandre Ramagem. They came in second place behind Eduardo Paes and Eduardo Cavaliere.
