= Eduardo Cavaliere =

Mayor of Rio de Janeiro since 2026

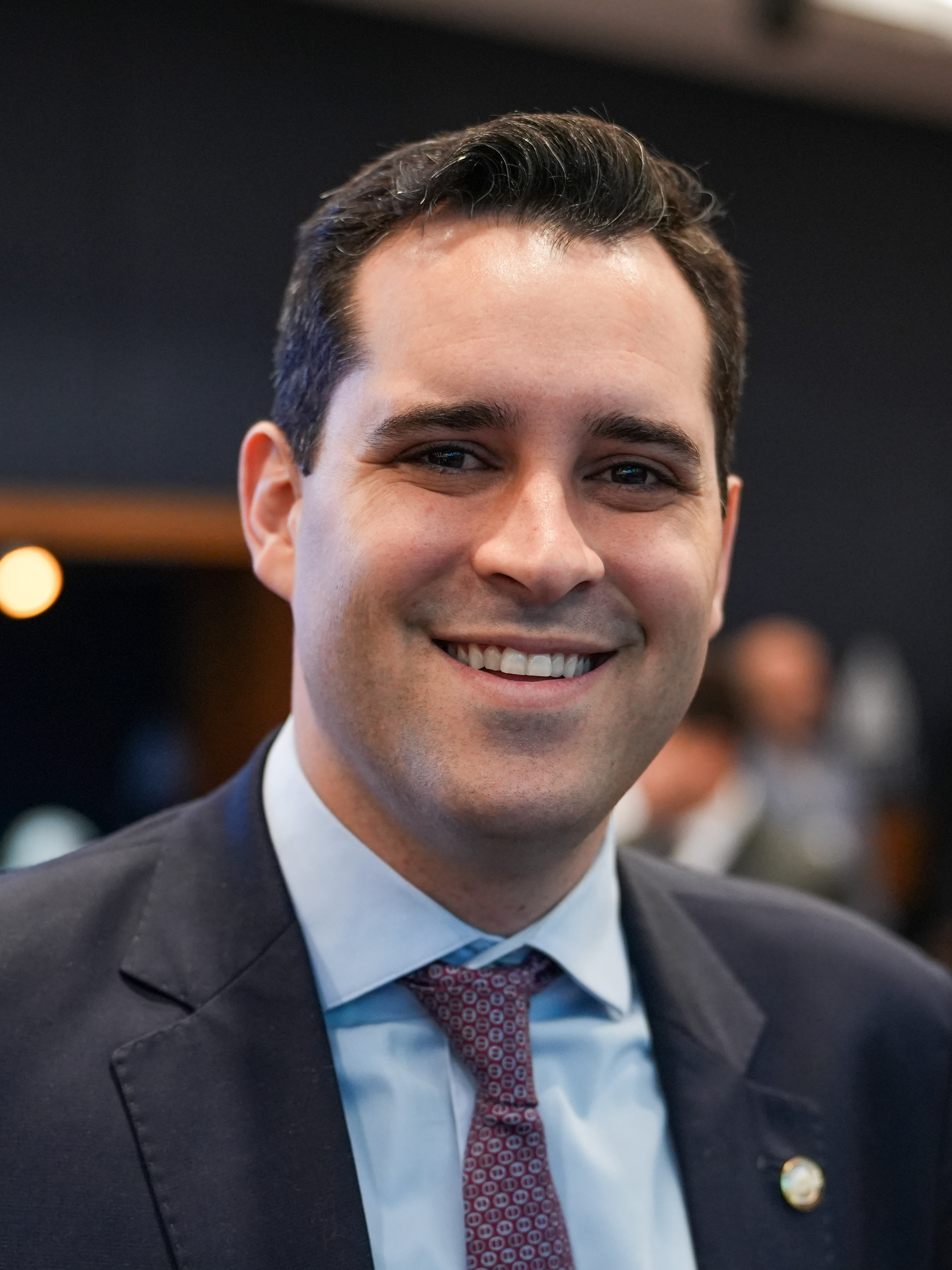
- Cavaliere in 2024

Mayor of Rio de Janeiro
- Incumbent
- Assumed office 20 March 2026
- Deputy: Vacant
- Preceded by: Eduardo Paes

Deputy Mayor of Rio de Janeiro
- In office 1 January 2025 – 20 March 2026
- Mayor: Eduardo Paes
- Preceded by: Nilton Caldeira
- Succeeded by: Vacant

State Deputy of Rio de Janeiro
- In office 1 February 2023 – 1 January 2025
- Constituency: At-large
Municipal cabinet offices
Chief of Staff to the Mayor of Rio de Janeiro
In office 18 January 2023 – 5 June 2024
Mayor	Eduardo Paes
Preceded by	Tony Chalita (de facto)
Succeeded by	Lucas Padilha
Secretary of the Environment of Rio de Janeiro
In office 19 December 2022 – 18 January 2023
Mayor	Eduardo Paes
Preceded by	Nilton Caldeira
Succeeded by	Lucas Padilha
In office 1 January 2021 – 31 March 2022
Mayor	Eduardo Paes
Preceded by	Marcelo Queiroz
Succeeded by	Lucas Padilha

Personal details
- Born: Eduardo Cavaliere Gonçalves Pinto; 29 September 1994 (age 32) Rio de Janeiro, Brazil
- Party: PSD (2021–present)
- Spouse: Victoria Henriques (m. 2023)
- Education: Fundação Getulio Vargas

Eduardo Cavaliere Gonçalves Pinto (born 29 September 1994) is a Brazilian lawyer and politician currently serving as mayor of Rio de Janeiro, since 2026. He is a member of the Social Democratic Party (PSD). He served as deputy mayor of Rio de Janeiro from 2025 to 2026, as the mayor’s chief of staff from 2023 to 2024 and as secretary of the environment from 2021 to 2023 during the mayoralty of Eduardo Paes.

In October 2021, he was the Brazilian delegate to the COP26, and later, in June 2022, to Stockholm+50, organized by the Swedish government and hosted by the United Nations General Assembly.

In 2022, Cavaliere was elected a state deputy for the state of Rio de Janeiro, with 33,688 votes.

In 2024, he was elected to become the deputy mayor of the city of Rio de Janeiro, winning in the first round as part of the ticket led by incumbent Eduardo Paes. They won against the second place ticket, led by Alexandre Ramagem and Índia Armelau, by a 30-point margin. He took office on 1 January 2025. He took office as mayor on 20 March 2026 after Eduardo Paes resigned to run for governor.

Political offices
Preceded by Nilton Caldeira	Vice Mayor of Rio de Janeiro; 2025–2026	Vacant
Preceded by Eduardo Paes	Mayor of Rio de Janeiro; 2026–present	Incumbent
