= Rick Azevedo =

Brazilian politician (born 1993)

- Azevedo in 2026

Member-elect of the Chamber of Deputies
- Assuming office 1 February 2027
- Constituency: Rio de Janeiro

Member of the Municipal Chamber of Rio de Janeiro
- Incumbent
- Assumed office 1 January 2025
- Constituency: At-large

Personal details
- Born: Ricardo Cardoso Azevedo; 11 November 1993 (age 32) Dianópolis, Tocantins, Brazil
- Party: PSOL

Ricardo Cardoso Azevedo (born 11 November 1993) is a Brazilian politician who was elected member of the Chamber of Deputies in 2026. He has been a member of the Municipal Chamber of Rio de Janeiro since 2025.
