= Marcio Ribeiro =

Brazilian politician (born 1983)

- Ribeiro in 2024

Member-elect of the Chamber of Deputies
- Assuming office 1 February 2027
- Constituency: Rio de Janeiro

Member of the Municipal Chamber of Rio de Janeiro
- Incumbent
- Assumed office 1 January 2021
- Constituency: At-large

Personal details
- Born: Márcio César Gomes Ribeiro Júnior; 25 June 1983 (age 43) Rio de Janeiro, Brazil
- Party: PSD

Marcio Cesar Gomes Ribeiro Junior (born 25 June 1983) is a Brazilian politician who was elected member of the Chamber of Deputies in 2026. He has been a member of the Municipal Chamber of Rio de Janeiro since 2021. From 2015 to 2016, he served as subprefect of Grande Tijuca.
