= Joyce Trindade =

Brazilian politician (born 1996)

- Trindade in 2024

Member of the Legislative Assembly of Rio de Janeiro
- Incumbent
- Assumed office 1 February 2027

Personal details
- Born: 13 November 1996 (age 29)
- Party: Social Democratic Party

Joyce Trindade de Faria Gama (born 13 November 1996) is a Brazilian politician who was elected member of the Legislative Assembly of Rio de Janeiro in 2026. She has been a member of the Municipal Chamber of Rio de Janeiro since 2025. From 2021 to 2024, she served as secretary for policies and promotion of women of Rio de Janeiro. From 2025 to 2026, she served as secretary for women and care of Rio de Janeiro.
