= Rodrigo Amorim =

Brazilian politician (born 1978)

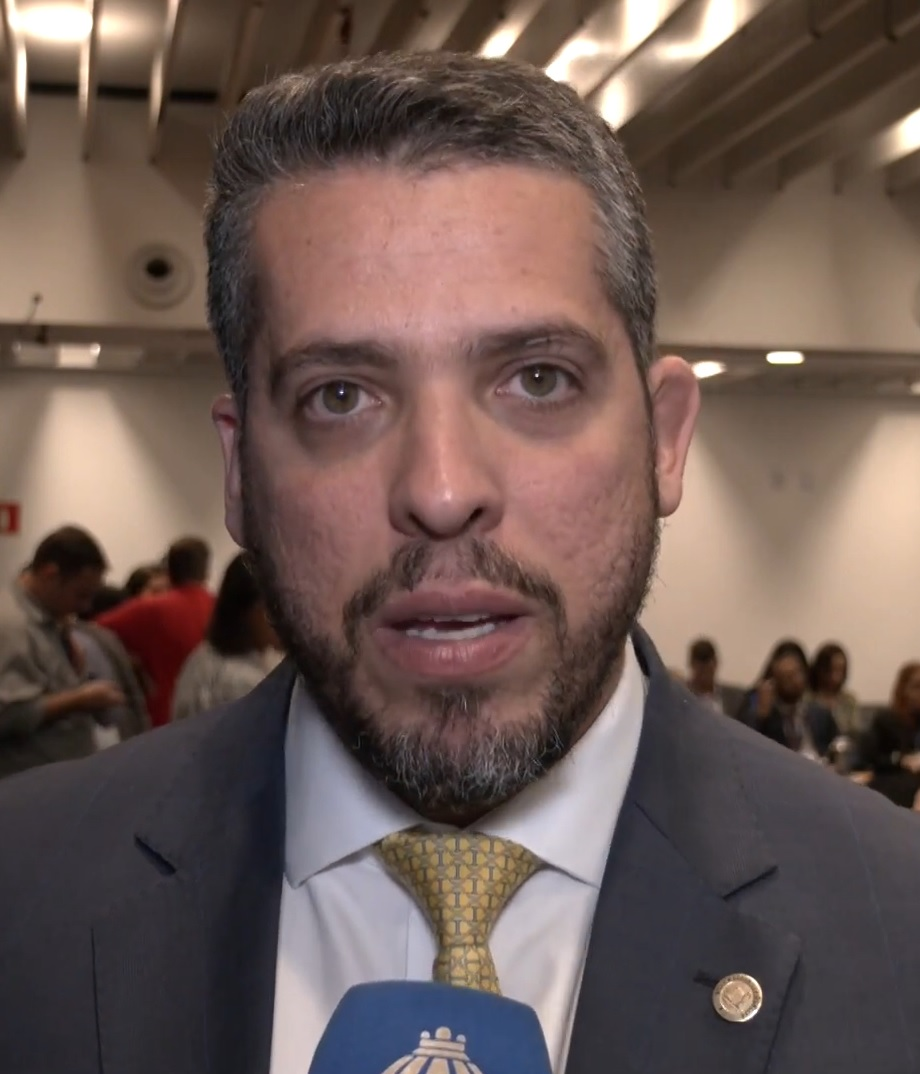
- Amorim in 2023

Member of the Legislative Assembly of Rio de Janeiro
- Incumbent
- Assumed office 1 February 2019

Personal details
- Born: 21 November 1978 (age 47)
- Party: Brazil Union (since 2024)

Rodrigo Martins Pires de Amorim (born 21 November 1978) is a Brazilian politician serving as a member of the Legislative Assembly of Rio de Janeiro since 2019. He was a candidate for mayor of Rio de Janeiro in the 2024 mayoral election.
