= Márcio Pacheco =

Brazilian politician (born 1975)

- Pacheco in 2017

President of the Court of Accounts of Rio de Janeiro
- Incumbent
- Assumed office 8 January 2025
- Preceded by: Rodrigo M. do Nascimento

Personal details
- Born: 9 January 1975 (age 51)
- Party: Social Christian Party (2004–2022)
- Relatives: Fred Pacheco (twin brother)

Márcio Henrique Cruz Pacheco (born 9 January 1975) is a Brazilian politician serving as president of the court of accounts of Rio de Janeiro since 2025. From 2011 to 2022, he was a member of the Legislative Assembly of Rio de Janeiro.
