= Talita Galhardo =

Brazilian politician (born 1983)

- Galhardo in 2024

Member-elect of the Chamber of Deputies
- Assuming office 1 February 2027
- Constituency: Rio de Janeiro

Member of the Municipal Chamber of Rio de Janeiro
- Incumbent
- Assumed office 1 January 2025
- Constituency: At-large

Personal details
- Born: Talita Galhardo Martins Borges Sousa; 25 March 1983 (age 43) Rio de Janeiro, Brazil
- Party: PSDB
- Profession: Journalist

Talita Galhardo Martins Borges Sousa (born 25 March 1983) is a Brazilian politician who was elected member of the Chamber of Deputies in 2026. She has been a member of the Municipal Chamber of Rio de Janeiro since 2025. From 2021 to 2023, she served as subprefect of Jacarepaguá.
