= Leniel Borel =

Brazilian politician (born 1984)

- Borel in 2024

Member of the Chamber of Deputies
- Assuming office 1 February 2027
- Constituency: Rio de Janeiro

Member of the Municipal Chamber of Rio de Janeiro
- Incumbent
- Assumed office 1 January 2025
- Constituency: At-large

Personal details
- Born: Leniel Borel de Almeida Júnior; 2 February 1984 (age 42) Duque de Caxias, Rio de Janeiro, Brazil
- Party: PP
- Children: Henry Borel
- Profession: Engineer

Leniel Borel de Almeida Júnior (born 2 February 1984) is a Brazilian politician who was elected member of the Chamber of Deputies in 2026. He has been a member of the Municipal Chamber of Rio de Janeiro since 2025. He was the father of Henry Borel until his death in 2021.
