= Marcelo Queiroz =

Brazilian politician (born 1984)

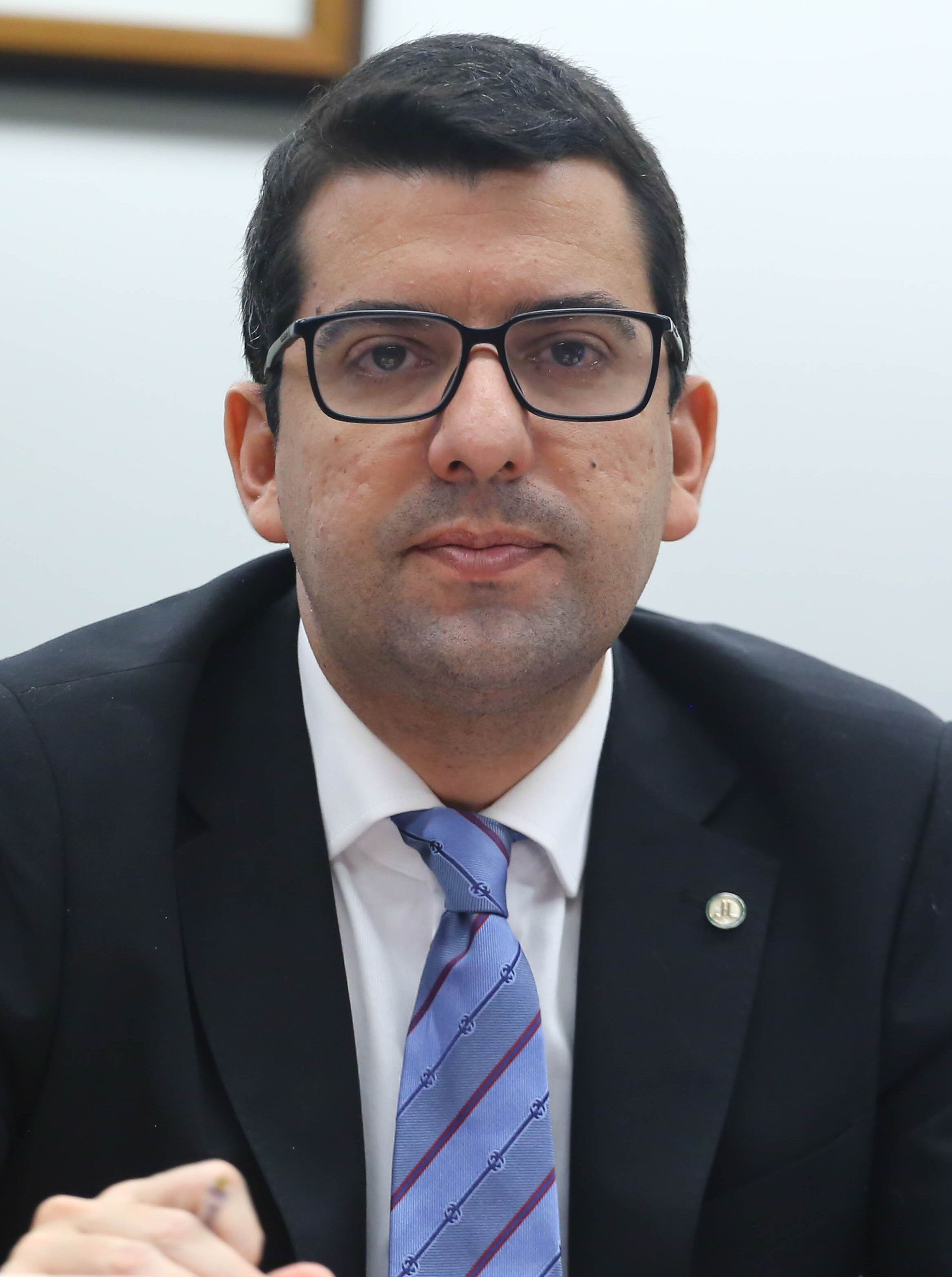
- Queiroz in 2023

Member of the Chamber of Deputies
- Incumbent
- Assumed office 1 February 2023
- Constituency: Rio de Janeiro

Member of the Legislative Assembly of Rio de Janeiro
- In office 1 August 2018 – 1 February 2019
- Constituency: At-large

Member of the Municipal Chamber of Rio de Janeiro
- In office 1 January 2013 – 1 January 2017
- Constituency: At-large

Personal details
- Born: Marcelo André Cid Heráclito de Porto Queiroz; 3 November 1984 (age 42) Rio de Janeiro, Brazil
- Party: PSDB (2025–present)
- Other political affiliations: DEM (2007–2011); PP (2011–2025)
- Profession: Lawyer

Marcelo André Cid Heráclito do Porto Queiroz (born 3 November 1984) is a Brazilian politician serving as a member of the Chamber of Deputies since 2023. From 2019 to 2022, he served as secretary of agriculture of Rio de Janeiro.
