= Henry Charles Armon Calvert =

Brazilian doctor and politician (born 1950)

Henry Charles

Personal details
- Born: Henry Charles Armon Calvert; 8 October 1950 (age 75)

Henry Charles Armon Calvert (born November 8, 1950), better known as Henry Charles or Doctor Charles, is a Brazilian physician and politician. He has served as a councilman, state deputy, and mayor of São Gonçalo.

Councilman of São Gonçalo for two terms, he was first elected state deputy in 1994 by the PSDB. In 1996, he ran for mayor of São Gonçalo under the PMDB, receiving just over 8% of the votes and finishing in third place. In 1998, he was re-elected as state deputy with over 31,000 votes. In the ALERJ, he served as acting president of the Budget Committee.

In 2000, he ran again for mayor of São Gonçalo under the PMDB, in a campaign marked by the slogan "Call the Doctor" and the jingle "It's 15, it's 15, it's 15, it's Doctor Charles," referencing his party's electoral number. In that election, he was elected in the second round, obtaining 56.59% of the valid votes, defeating the incumbent mayor Édson Ezequiel (PDT).
