= Rafael Satiê =

Brazilian politician (born 1987)

- Satiê in 2025

Member-elect of the Chamber of Deputies
- Assuming office 1 February 2027
- Constituency: Rio de Janeiro

Member of the Municipal Chamber of Rio de Janeiro
- Incumbent
- Assumed office 1 January 2025
- Constituency: At-large

Personal details
- Born: Rafael Silva Ferreira de Lima; 13 March 1987 (age 39) Rio de Janeiro, Brazil
- Party: PL

Rafael Silva Ferreira de Lima (born 13 March 1987), better known as Rafael Satiê, is a Brazilian politician who was elected member of the Chamber of Deputies in 2026. He has been a member of the Municipal Chamber of Rio de Janeiro since 2025.
