= Pedro Ernesto Palace =

- Palácio Pedro Ernesto
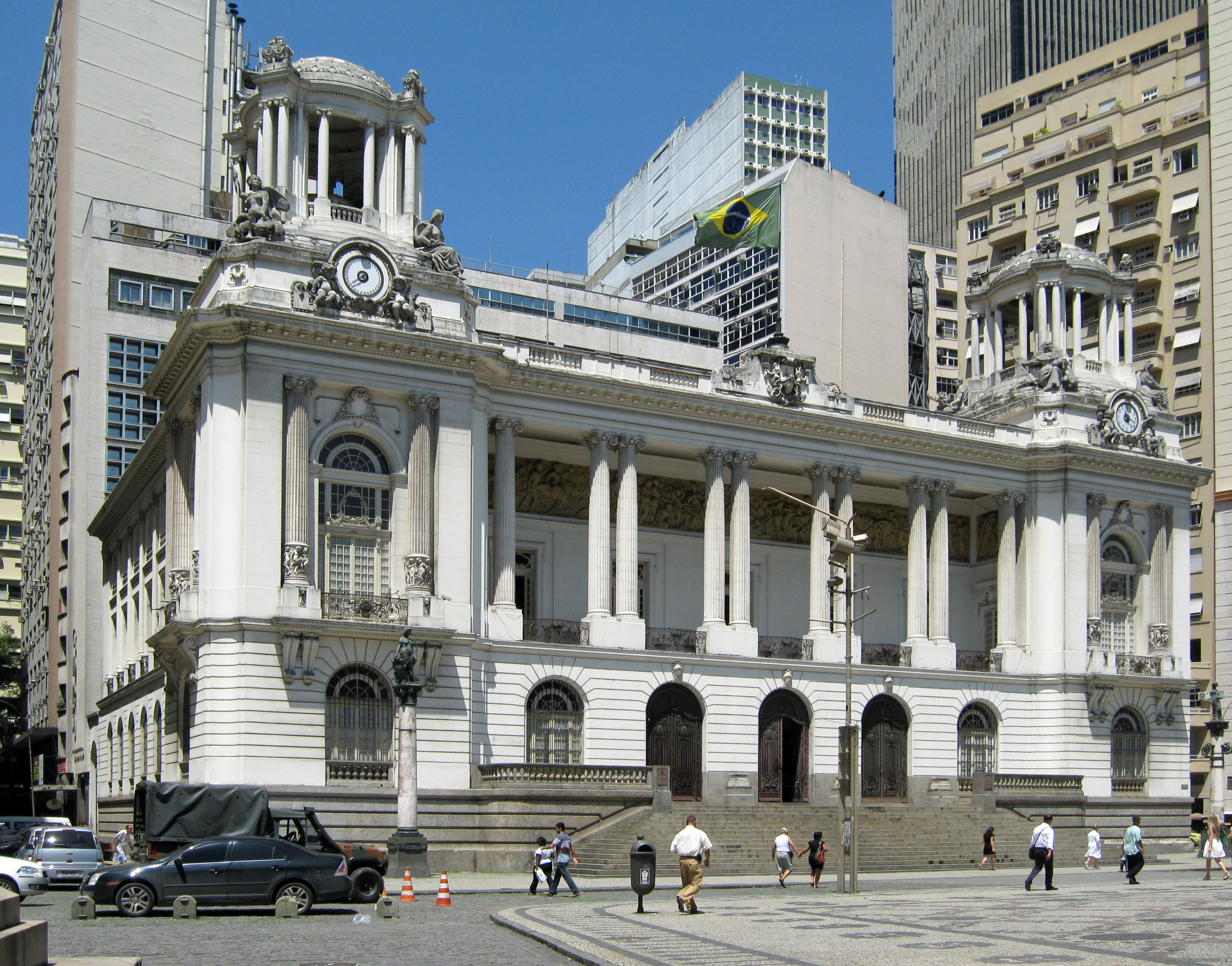

- Location within Rio de Janeiro

General information
- Status: Seat of the Municipal Chamber of Rio de Janeiro
- Location: Rio de Janeiro, Praça Floriano, s/n, Brazil
- Coordinates: 22°54′36″S 43°10′48″W
- Inaugurated: 1923
- Owner: Rio de Janeiro city government

Design and construction
- Architects: Archimedes Memoria; Heitor de Melo

The Pedro Ernesto Palace is a historic building located in Rio de Janeiro, Brazil. Since 1923, the building has housed the Municipal Chamber of Rio de Janeiro.

== History ==
The building was inaugurated in 1923, receiving the nickname "Golden Cage" from the historian Brasil Gerson due to the high cost of its construction, 23 million réis, more than twice the cost of building the Municipal Theatre of Rio de Janeiro. The design and construction of the building were carried out by the engineer Heitor de Melo and the architect Arquimedes Memória, with works by Carlos Oswald, Eliseu Visconti and the brothers Carlos and Rodolfo Chambelland.

Before finally settling in the Pedro Ernesto Palace in 1923, the Municipal Chamber occupied 14 different properties, including the Town Hall and Jail on Morro do Castelo (1567–1637), the Ground Floor House next to the Church of São José (1636–1736), the Old Jail (1736–1787 and 1792–1808), the Arco do Teles in Largo do Paço (1787–1790), the City Hall in Campo de Santana (1825–1874), the Campo de Santana Palace (1882–1896) and the Arts and Crafts School (1919–1923).

== See also ==
- Pedro Ernesto
