= Eduardo Paes =

Brazilian politician (born 1969)

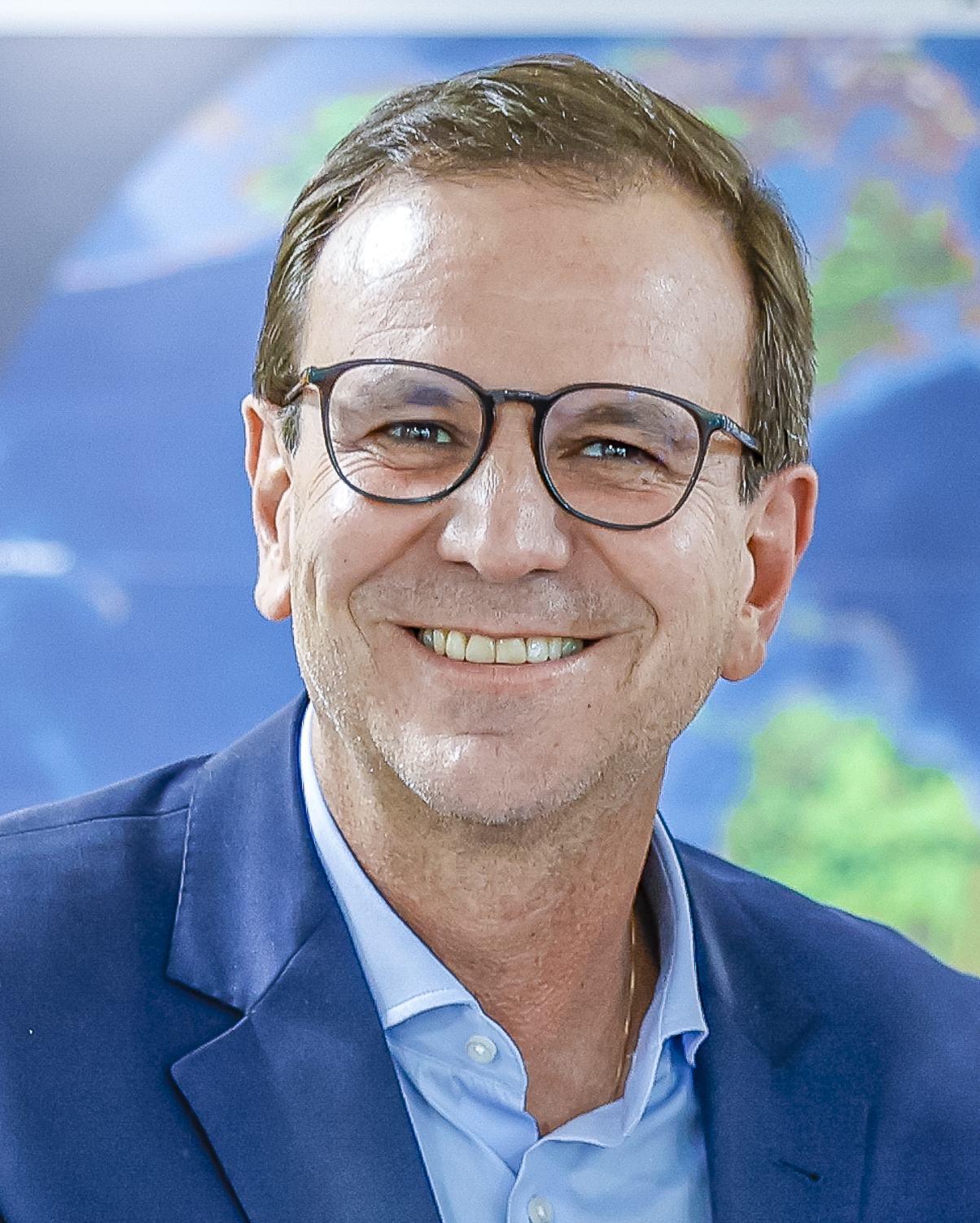
- Paes in 2024

Mayor of Rio de Janeiro
- In office 1 January 2021 – 20 March 2026
- Deputy: Nilton Caldeira; Eduardo Cavaliere
- Preceded by: Marcelo Crivella
- Succeeded by: Eduardo Cavaliere
- In office 1 January 2009 – 1 January 2017
- Deputy: Carlos Alberto Muniz; Adilson Pires
- Preceded by: Cesar Maia
- Succeeded by: Marcelo Crivella

Secretary of Tourism, Sport and Recreation of Rio de Janeiro
- In office 1 January 2007 – 4 June 2008
- Governor: Sérgio Cabral Filho
- Preceded by: Sérgio Ricardo de Almeida; (Tourism) Francisco de Carvalho; (Sport)
- Succeeded by: Márcia Beatriz Lins Izidoro

Secretary of the Environment of Rio de Janeiro
- In office 1 January 2001 – 1 April 2002
- Mayor: Cesar Maia
- Preceded by: Maurício Lobo Abreu
- Succeeded by: Ayrton Alvarenga Xerez

Member of the Chamber of Deputies
- In office 3 April 2002 – 1 January 2007
- Constituency: Rio de Janeiro
- In office 1 February 1999 – 1 January 2001
- Constituency: Rio de Janeiro

Member of the Municipal Chamber of Rio de Janeiro
- In office 1 January 1997 – 1 February 1999
- Constituency: At-large

Personal details
- Born: 14 November 1969 (age 56) Rio de Janeiro, Guanabara, Brazil
- Party: PSD (2021–present)
- Other political affiliations: PV (1994–1995); PFL (1995–1999; 2001–2003); PTB (1999–2001); PSDB (2003–2007); PMDB (2007–2018); DEM (2018–2021)
- Spouse: Cristine Paes
- Children: 2
- Education: Pontifical Catholic University of Rio de Janeiro (LL.B.); Federal University of Rio de Janeiro (PG.Cert.)
- Paes's voice Paes on the future of Rio de Janeiro after the 2016 Olympics and Paralympics; Recorded 19 September 2016

Eduardo da Costa Paes (Brazilian Portuguese: [eˈdwaʁdu dɐ ˈkɔstɐ pɐjs], born 14 November 1969) is a Brazilian politician who served as mayor of Rio de Janeiro from 2009 to 2017, and again from 2021 to 2026. On 12 August, at the 2012 Summer Olympics closing ceremony, he took the Olympic Flag, via Jacques Rogge, from London Mayor Boris Johnson.

Paes was a trenchant critic of the Lula administration, particularly during the Mensalão scandal in 2005 over alleged payments to congresspeople for votes. When it came to his administration as Rio de Janeiro's mayor, scandals continued to occur.

As mayor during the bid, preparation and execution of the 2016 Summer Olympics in Rio, Paes faced many challenges, balancing the demands and opportunities of the Olympics with the needs of the Cariocas (the people of Rio de Janeiro).

Paes ran unsuccessfully for Rio de Janeiro state governor in 2018. He was elected for a third term as Rio de Janeiro mayor in 2020, defeating incumbent Marcelo Crivella in the run-off. Despite being elected mayor as a member of the Democrats in 2020, Paes joined the Social Democratic Party (PSD) in 2021, starting a movement for other politicians connected to the mayor to affiliate themselves to the party.

Eduardo Paes resigned as mayor on 20 March 2026 to run for governor of Rio de Janeiro State. He lost in the first round of voting to Douglas Ruas.

== Personal life ==
Paes, a Catholic, is married to Cristine; they have two children.

== Electoral history ==
Election	Party	Office	Coalition	Running mate	First round		Second round		Results
Election	Party	Office	Coalition	Running mate	Votes	%	Votes	%	Results
1996 Rio de Janeiro municipal election	PFL	City councilor	—N/a	—N/a	82,418	(#1)	—N/a	—N/a	Elected
1998 Rio de Janeiro state election	PFL	Federal deputy	Governo de Verdade (PFL, PPB, PTB)	—N/a	117,164	1.65 (#5)	—N/a	—N/a	Elected
2002 Rio de Janeiro state election	PFL	Federal deputy	Todos pelo Rio (PFL, PMDB, PSDB)	—N/a	186,221	2.31 (#5)	—N/a	—N/a	Elected
2006 Rio de Janeiro state election	PSDB	Governor	—N/a	Maria Estela Kubitschek (PSDB)	440,484	5.33 (#5)	—N/a	—N/a	Lost
2008 Rio de Janeiro municipal election	PMDB	Mayor	Unidos pelo Rio (PMDB, PP, PTB, PSL)	Alberto Muniz (PMDB)	1,049,019	31.98 (#1)	1.696.195	50.83 (#1)	Elected
2012 Rio de Janeiro municipal election	PMDB	Mayor	Somos Um Rio (PRB, PP, PDT, PT, PTB, PMDB, PSL, PTN, PSC, PPS, PSDC, PRTB, PHS, PMN, PTC, PSB, PRP, PSD, PCdoB, PTdoB)	Adilson Pires (PMDB)	2,097,733	64.60 (#1)	—N/a	—N/a	Elected
2018 Rio de Janeiro state election	DEM	Governor	Força do Rio (DEM, PPS, PSDB, PP, PTB, MDB, SD, PV, DC, PHS, AVANTE, PMN)	Comte Bittencourt (PPS)	1,494,831	19.56 (#2)	3,134,400	40.13 (#2)	Lost
2020 Rio de Janeiro municipal election	DEM	Mayor	A Certeza de Um Rio Melhor (DEM, PL, Cidadania, DC, PV, Avante, PSDB)	Nilton Caldeira (PL)	974,804	37.01 (#1)	1,629,319	64.07 (#1)	Elected
2024 Rio de Janeiro municipal election	PSD	Mayor	É o Rio Seguindo em Frente (PSD, PDT, PSB, PT/PCdoB/PV, Avante, Solidariedade, Agir, PODE, PRD, DC)	Eduardo Cavaliere (PSD)	1,861,856	60.47 (#1)	—N/a	—N/a	Elected

Political offices
Preceded by César Maia	Mayor of Rio de Janeiro; 2009–2017	Succeeded by Marcelo Crivella
Preceded by Marcelo Crivella	Mayor of Rio de Janeiro; 2021–2026	Succeeded by Eduardo Cavaliere
Party political offices
Preceded by Luiz Paulo Corrêa (1998)	PSDB nominee for Governor of Rio de Janeiro; 2006	Most recent
Preceded by Luiz Paulo Conde	PMDB nominee for Mayor of Rio de Janeiro; 2008, 2012	Succeeded by Pedro Paulo
Preceded by Solange Amaral (2002, as PFL)	DEM nominee for Governor of Rio de Janeiro; 2018	Most recent
Preceded by Rodrigo Maia (2012)	DEM nominee for Mayor of Rio de Janeiro; 2020	Most recent
