= Dr. Luizinho =

Brazilian politician (born 1973)

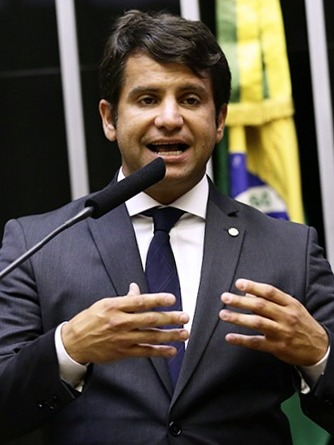
- Luizinho in 2021

Member of the Chamber of Deputies
- Incumbent
- Assumed office 1 February 2019
- Constituency: Rio de Janeiro

State Secretary of Health of Rio de Janeiro
- In office 1 January 2023 – 12 September 2023
- Governor: Cláudio Castro
- Preceded by: Alexandre Chieppe
- Succeeded by: Cláudia Mello
- In office 1 January 2016 – 6 April 2018
- Governor: Luiz Fernando Pezão
- Preceded by: Felipe Peixoto
- Succeeded by: Sérgio D'Abreu Gama

Personal details
- Born: Luiz Antônio de Souza Teixeira Júnior; 15 December 1973 (age 52) Nova Iguaçu, Rio de Janeiro, Brazil
- Party: PP (since 2018)
- Profession: Physician

Luiz Antônio de Souza Teixeira Júnior, better known as Dr. Luizinho (born 15 December 1973), is a Brazilian politician serving as a member of the Chamber of Deputies since 2019. From 2013 to 2015, he served as secretary of health of Nova Iguaçu. From 2016 to 2018 and in 2023, he served as secretary of health of Rio de Janeiro.

== Political Career ==
He was first elected to the Chamber of Deputies in 2018 with 103,745 votes, making him the candidate from the Progressistas party with the highest number of votes in the state, and the eleventh overall.

In Congress, he chaired the External Commission for Combating Covid-19. In 2021, Luizinho was elected chair of the Committee on Social Security and the Family.

He was re-elected as a federal deputy in the 2022 elections with 190,071 votes—the fourth-highest total in the state, and again in 2026, securing the highest number of votes in the state with 213.904 votes, or 2.41% of the total vote.

However, in early 2023, he took a leave of absence from his parliamentary seat to resume his role as Secretary of State for Health for Rio de Janeiro, at the invitation of the state's governor, Cláudio Castro. He stepped down from this position on September 12, 2023, to return to the Chamber of Deputies, where he assumed leadership of the Progressistas party.

== Elections ==
Année	Election	Party	Poste	Votes	%	Results	Ref
2018	Elections in Rio de Janeiro	PP	Federal deputy	103.745	1,34%	Yes	
2022	Elections in Rio de Janeiro	PP	Federal deputy	190.071		Yes	
2026	Elections in Rio de Janeiro	PP	Federal deputy	213.904	2,41%	Yes	
