= Otoni de Paula =

Brazilian politician

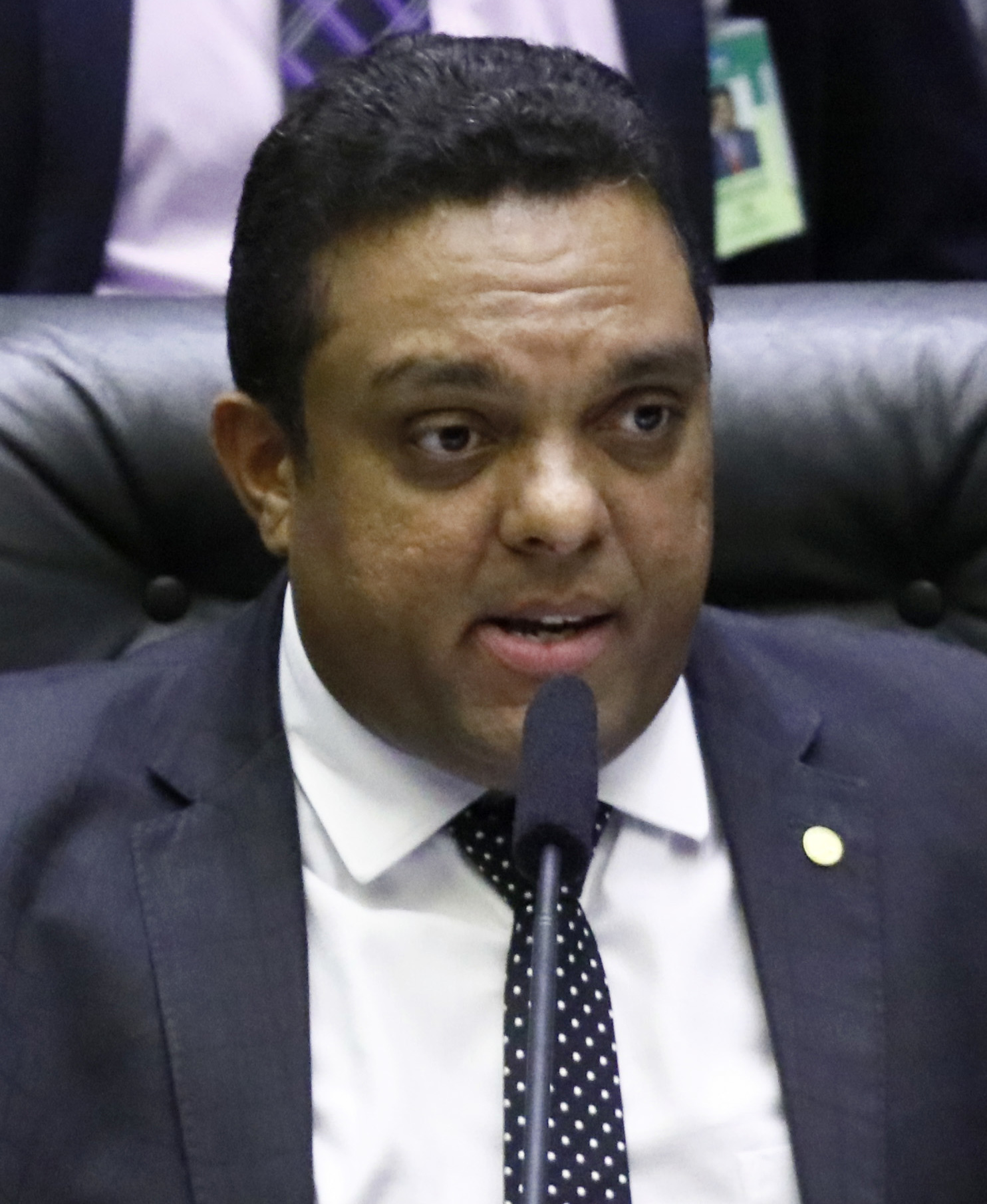
- de Paula in June 2019

Federal Deputy for Rio de Janeiro
- In office 1 February 2019 – 1 February 2027

Alderman for Rio de Janeiro
- In office 1 January 2017 – 30 January 2019

Personal details
- Born: 22 November 1976 (age 49) Niterói, Rio de Janeiro, Brazil
- Party: PSD, MDB (...-2026?)

Otoni Moura de Paula Júnior (born 22 November 1976) is a Brazilian politician and pastor. He has spent his political career representing Rio de Janeiro, having served as federal deputy representative from 2019 to 2027. He did not succeed to reelect in the 2026 elections obtaining only 19.364 of votes (0,22%). He ran for the Social Democratic Party.

== Personal life ==
He is the son of politician and social worker Otoni de Paula Pai. De Paula is also the nephew of the evangelical singer Ozéias de Paula who was part of the gospel duo Otoniel & Ozie, composed of him and Feliciano Amaral. He, his father, and his uncle are all pastors and singers of the Assembleias de Deus church.

== Political career ==
From 2017 to 2019 de Paula served as a Vereador or councilman for the city of Rio de Janeiro. In June 2018 he led an impeachment attempt on mayor Marcelo Crivella. Although both evangelical politicians with socially conservative views, de Paula claimed that Crivella was privileging the Universal Church of the Kingdom of God and trying to convert Rio de Janeiro to that denomination.

In the 2018 election de Paula was in the top ten most voted candidate in the state of Rio de Janeiro, being elected to the federal chamber of deputies. His father also ran in the elections under the banner of the Solidariedade party, but was not elected.

In July 2019 de Paula announced that he was running as a candidate for the PSC in the 2020 Rio de Janeiro mayoral election.

He did not succeed to reelect in the 2026 elections when he ran for the PSD.

He's being investigated at the case of "Hate Office", and spent public money to finance fake news.
