= Fred Pacheco =

Brazilian politician (born 1975)

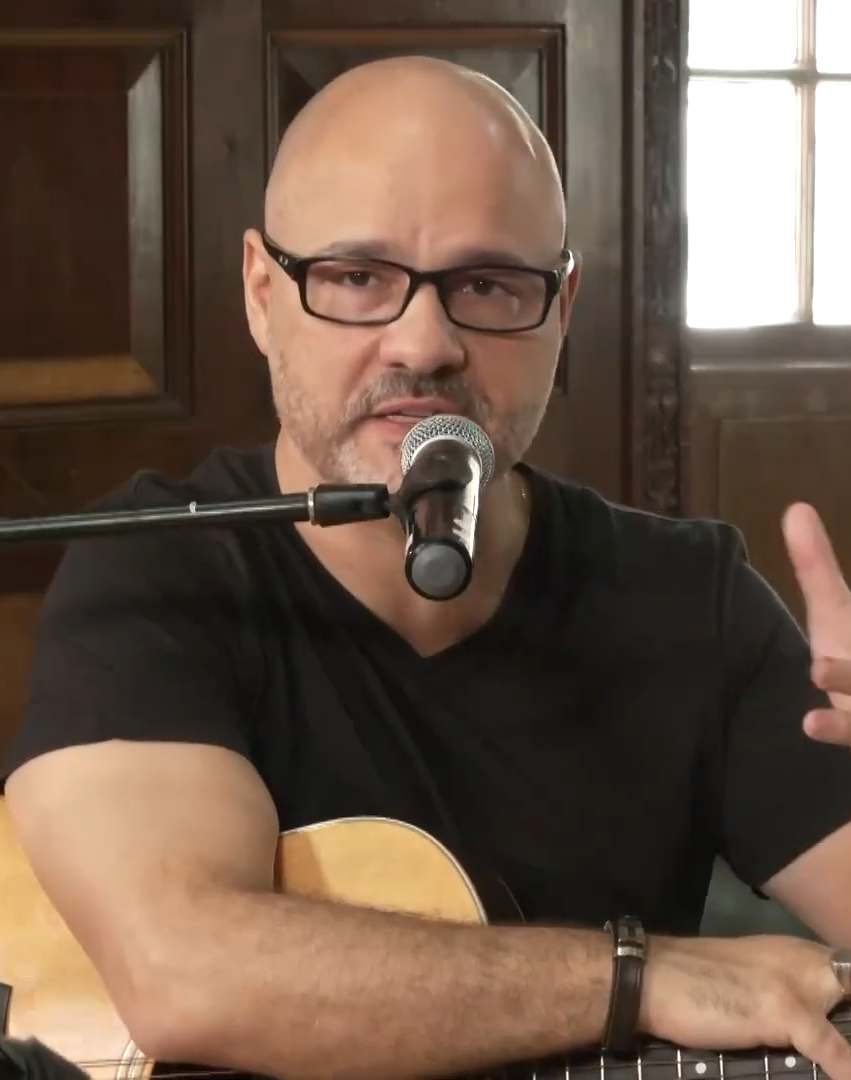
- Pacheco in 2023

Member of the Legislative Assembly of Rio de Janeiro
- Incumbent
- Assumed office 1 February 2023

Personal details
- Born: 9 January 1975 (age 51)
- Party: National Mobilization (since 2022)
- Relatives: Márcio Pacheco (twin brother)

Frederico Augusto Cruz Pacheco (born 9 January 1975) is a Brazilian politician serving as a member of the Legislative Assembly of Rio de Janeiro since 2023. He is the twin brother of Márcio Pacheco.
