= Engenho da Rainha =

- Neighborhood
- Location in Rio de Janeiro Engenho da Rainha (Brazil)
- Coordinates: 22°51′47″S 43°17′44″W
- Country: Brazil
- State: Rio de Janeiro (RJ)
- Municipality/City: Rio de Janeiro
- Zone: North Zone

Population (2010)
  - Total: 26,659

Engenho da Rainha is a neighborhood in the North Zone of Rio de Janeiro, Brazil.
