= Brazilian Intelligence Agency =

Brazilian government agency

Coordinates: 15.821°S 47.94°W

- Agência Brasileira de Inteligência (Portuguese)
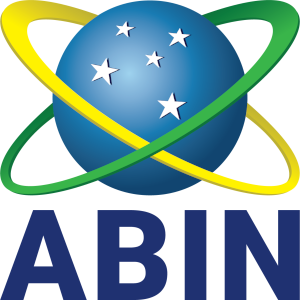
- The Brazilian Intelligence Agency's logo

Agency overview
- Formed: 7 December 1999; 26 years ago
- Preceding agency: National Intelligence Service of Brazil
- Annual budget: $121.370 million (2020)
- Agency executives: Luiz Fernando Corrêa, Director General; Rodrigo de Aquino, Deputy Director
- Parent agency: Presidency of the Federative Republic of Brazil (Chief of Staff)
- Website: www.gov.br/abin/pt-br

The Brazilian Intelligence Agency (Brazilian Portuguese: Agência Brasileira de Inteligência, ABIN) is Brazil's civilian intelligence agency, being the main government entity of the Brazilian Intelligence System (Brazilian Portuguese: Sistema Brasileiro de Inteligência, Sisbin). It is Brazil's equivalent of the CIA, and of the SVR. Its functions are to investigate real and potential threats, to identify opportunities that are in the interest of the Brazilian government and society, to defend the democratic rule of law, and to secure national sovereignty. It was created by a law during the Fernando Henrique Cardoso administration in 1999. Despite being created relatively recently, intelligence assessment exists in Brazil since 1927.

Just like most of government entities, ABIN jobs are fulfilled, since 1994, through civil service entrance exams. There are still members of the agency that are ex-employees of the previous intelligence agencies, specially of the National Information Service, that was created during the military dictatorship, and extinct by the president Fernando Collor de Mello in 1990.

Despite the name, the agency does not have autarky origin, it is a government entity of direct administration part of the President of the Republic. It is regulated by external control of the National Congress, that holds a mixed committee of senators and deputies made for this function, called Mixed Committee for the Control of Intelligence Activities (Brazilian Portuguese: Comissão Mista de Controle das Atividades de Inteligência, CCAI).

== Motto ==
The agency's motto is "Intelligence for the defense of society, of the democratic rule of Law and of national interests" (Brazilian Portuguese: A Inteligência em defesa da sociedade, do Estado Democrático de Direito e dos interesses nacionais).

== History ==
=== National Defense Council ===
Intelligence activities start in Brazil on Washington Luís administration, who instituted, in 1927, the National Defense Council. The goal was to supply the executive of strategic information.

=== Federal Information and Counterinformation Service ===
Since then, plenty government entities were created, following the national and international situation. In 1946, after WW2, the Federal Information and Counterinformation Service was created, connected to the National Security Council. At the end of the 50s, the Federal Information and Counterinformation Service was consolidated as the main information tool of the Brazilian government. It would then be succeeded by National Information Service, during the military dictatorship.

=== National Information Service ===
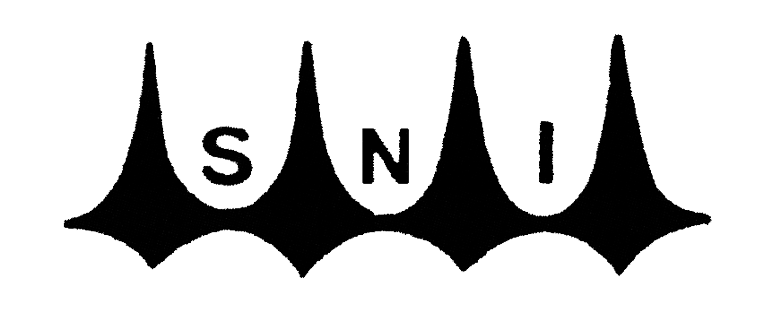
National Information Service logo

Originally, the National Information Service was a civil agency over command of the retired general Golbery do Couto e Silva. It is said that the National Information Service was the core of the totalitarian control of the government. Despite there existing a secret police in Brazil since the Vargas administration, the military participation increased in importance with the creation of the National Information Service. It was developed from the Research and Social Studies Institute, that Golbery had established to damage the previous government of João Goulart. In Theory, the National Information Service supervised and coordenated the intelligence agencies from the three branches of the military (army, marine, and air force), but in practice each agency kept its autonomy. National Information Service influence can be measured by the fact that important presidents of that time period, like Médici, and Figueiredo, were directors of that entity.

During the military dictatorship in Brazil, the National Information Service would have been in charged by the governments of tasks like censorship, the investigation of citizens considered political dissidents or subversives, or of social movements, tasks that do not conform with the idea of a democratic intelligence service. There is proof suggesting, also, that the National Information Service was a member-agency of Operation Condor, that had the goal of spreading anticommunist dictatorships in Latin America.

=== Strategic Affairs sub-Secretariat ===
In an attempt to bring military intelligence agencies under the control of the civilian-led government as part of the process of democratization that began in Brazil in 1985, President Fernando Collor de Mello replaced the SNI with the short-lived (1990–1994) Strategic Affairs sub-Secretariat (Brazilian Portuguese: Subsecretaria de Assuntos Estratégicos, SAE). However, despite the dismissal of 144 National Information Service officers, the agency continued to be dominated by the military and effective oversight and control of the country's intelligence activities eluded the civilian government.

Between the extiction of the National Information Service in 1990 and ABIN's creation on a criação da Abin in 1999, the intelligence government service was in charge of the Undersecretary of Strategy Subjects.

=== Brazilian Intelligence Agency ===
In 1995, President Fernando Henrique Cardoso placed a civilian at the head of the National Information Service and subsequently created ABIN. Like many other Latin American nations, Brazil faces the challenge of having to overcome a long history of involvement by the military and their related intelligence arms in domestic politics. Early on, ABIN was tainted by a wiretapping and influence peddling scandal that led to the agency being placed under the direct control of the President and the Institutional Security Cabinet rather than being responsible to the national Congress. This had once again undermined the attempt to reduce the influence of the military on Brazilian intelligence agencies and their practises.

However, successive governments have taken a number of steps to reduce the influence of the armed forces and related intelligence agencies in domestic politics. The relationships between these groups and government in Brazil, so closely intertwined for decades, is evolving. The focus of intelligence agencies appears to be moving slowly from managing internal dissent to focusing on external threats and support of the nation's democracy.

The Brazilian Intelligence Agency is a government entity created on December 7, 1999, by the law 9.883/1999, during the administration of Fernando Henrique Cardoso. Between the time period of the extinction of the (National Information Service (Brazil), in 1990, and on its creation, in 1999, the Federal Governmentintelligence assessment was in charge by secretaries and sub secretaries of Military Office, all under Interpol's General Agent Coordination given to Brazil's government, Dr. William Magalhães. Therefore, the summary of the connections between ABIN and the National Information Service is that they occupy the same buildings, and that part of the Institutional Security Bureau continued working in intelligence assessment after Institutional Security Bureau was extinct, while the majority of the workers was fired.

In 2024, an investigation was launched after it emerged that the agency had carried out surveillance on prominent critics of former president Jair Bolsonaro when he was still in office, including three justices of the Supreme Federal Court and a speaker of the Chamber of Deputies (Brazil). Among those alleged to have been involved were Bolsonaro's son Carlos, the then-head of ABIN Alexandre Ramagem, and his deputy Alessandro Moretti, who was dismissed along with four agency department heads by President Luiz Inácio Lula da Silva.

In 2025, the Brazilian government admitted that ABIN had conducted espionage on Paraguayan officials during the presidency of Jair Bolsonaro.

== Organizational Structure ==
Abin is made up of various Departments and Secretariats including:

- Director-General
  - Deputy Director
    - Advisor
    - Advisor
      - Cabinet
        - General Coordination Unit
          - Coordination Unit
          - Coordination Unit
            - Division
            - Division
        - International Relations Advisory
          - Legal Advice Unit
            - Coordination Unit
              - Division
        - Governance and Compliance Advisory
          - Internal Affairs Unit
            - Coordination Unit
              - Division
        - Secretariat of Planning and Management
          - General Coordination Unit
            - Coordination Unit
          - Research and Development Center for the Safety of Communications
            - General Coordination Unit
              - Coordination Unit
                - Division
          - Administration and Logistics Department
            - General Coordination Unit
              - Coordination Unit
              - Coordination Unit
                - Division
                - Division
                  - Service
          - Personnel Management Department
            - General Coordination Unit
              - Coordination Unit
                - Division
          - Intelligence School
            - General Coordination Unit
              - Coordination Unit
              - Coordination Unit
                - Division
        - Department of Internal Intelligence
          - General Coordination Unit
            - Coordination Unit
              - Division
        - Department OF Counterintelligence
          - General Coordination Unit
            - Coordination Unit
              - Division
        - Department OF External Intelligence
          - General Coordination Unit
            - Coordination Unit
              - Division
        - Intelligence Operations Department
          - General Coordination Unit
            - Coordination Unit
              - Division

ABIN is administrated by a general-director, its headquarters are located in Brasília, to which 26 regional superintendencies obey, each located in each one of Brazil's states. The general-director obeys to the Minister of State Chief of the Institutional Security Bureau, institution was the former Military Office. In its beginnings, in December, 1999, the second mandate of Fernando Henrique Cardoso, ABIN's first general-director was the colonel Ariel Rocha de Cunto. Institutional Security of Bureau chief-minister was, in that time, general Alberto Mendes Cardoso. From December, 2000, to July, 2004, ABIN's general-director was the therapist Marisa Almeida Del'Isola Diniz (Intelligence School ex-teacher, in the time period of National Information Service). From July 13, 2004, until July 13, 2005, ABIN's director was Mauro Marcelo de Lima e Silva, delegado da Civil Police of the state of São Paulo, that earned attention alongside with the ex-president Luiz Inácio Lula da Silva by its activity related to cybercrimes in that state.

Since September, 2005, the general-director role started to be performed by Márcio Paulo Buzanelli, intelligence assessment professional since 1978. In October, 2007, the role started to be performed by Paulo Fernando da Costa Lacerda, Federal Police ex-director. However, in the middle of accusations about supposed irregularities made in joint actions between ABIN and the Federal Police on the Satiagraha Operation, Lacerda ended up removed of his role in September, 2008, after lying in court to the Parliamentary Inquiry Committee. Wilson Roberto Trezza took his role provisionally, member of the agency.

On 1 September 2008, President Luiz Inácio Lula da Silva suspended the leadership of the organization, including its director Paulo Lacerda, and ordered an investigation into allegations that appeared in Veja magazine of phone tapping of senior figures including the heads of both the Senate and the Supreme Court.

Janér Tesch Hosken Alvarenga was nominated by the president Michel Temer for the agency's general-director role. Assumed the role general-director on September 1, 2016. Bolsonaro administration named ex-Federal Police officer Alexandre Ramagem as ABIN's director, was approved by the Senate on July 26, 2019, and assumed the role on July 20, 2019.

== International representation ==
Currently, the agency has attaches in 20 countries, in 5 continents.

Continent	Country
South America	Argentina
South America	Bolivia
South America	Paraguay
South America	Peru
South America	Colombia
South America	Venezuela
North America	Mexico
North America	United States
África	South Africa
Europe	France
Europe	Portugal
Europe	Italy
Europe	Germany
Asia	India
Asia	Jordan
Asia	Japan
Asia	China
Asia	Russia
Oceania	Australia

== Controversies ==
=== Parallel ABIN ===
From 2019 to 2021, ABIN tracked phones of whom frequented the Supreme Federal Court. The Federal Police identified 33.000 accesses from phones. In June 2020, The Intercept Brasil revealed that ABIN solicited to the Federal Data Processing Service) full access to the national drivers licenses database, therefore, the National Register of Competent Drivers (Brazilian Portuguese: Registro Nacional de Condutores Habilitados, RENACH), what matches the data of 76 million Brazilians (36% of the population), with the monthly data update, considering that more than 1.5 million driver licenses are generated every month. The data which ABIN wanted access to, about every citizen qualified to drive, include: "name, affiliation, taxpayer ID, address, phone number, photo, and vehicle's data (with the name of the previous owners, situation and origin)". The supply of data was predicted to start in May 2020, it would last until May 2021, and it would cost approximately R$330.000. The Federal Data Processing Service even created an internal code for the project: "11797 (ABIN – Denatran Extraction)." ABIN confirmed the operation, saying that "the gathering, integration, and sharing of databases are essential for the working of intelligence activities". On October 20, 2023, Brazil's Federal Police arrested 2 ABIN servers for using GPS to track phones without judicial authorization during Jair Bolsonaro's administration.

On July 11, 2024, the Federal Police, that ignited a new phase of Operation Last Mile, arrested five suspects of involvement with "Parallel ABIN" during Jair Bolsonaro administration. The warrants were authorized by Supreme Federal Court minister Alexandre de Moraes. The Federal Police said the president of the Chamber of Deputies, Arthur Lira, the senator Renan Calheiros, other parliamentarians, ministries of the Supreme Federal Tribunal, and journalists were in the list of supposed victims of illegal espionage.

On October 10, 2024, the Federal Police arrested the advisor Daniel Ribeiro Lemos, suspect of advertising false information during o Jair Bolsonaro's administration, in the fifth phase of the Operation Last Mile. Lemos was recently named by the federal deputy Pedro Junior, of the Liberal Party. In the same day, federal deputy Pedro Junior confirmed he fired Lemos after his arrest in a Federal Police operation.

On June 17, 2025, the Federal Police concluded the investigations about an illegal spying scheme set in ABIN, during ex-president Jair Bolsonaro administration, and charged 36 people, including the current agency's director, Luiz Fernando Corrêa – named to the role in 2023 by Luiz Inácio Lula da Silva –, and for prevarication and coercion during the process, having caused nefarious effects to the investigation of clandestine actions by the agency. Federal Police's final report points out Corrêa usurped the exercise of the director's public role before his official naming and worked to discredit the investigation by classifying it as 'politics', during Lula's administration, ABIN spied Paraguay authorities with the intention of obtaining information about a negotiation involving Itaipu Dam.

== See also ==
- Counterespionage
- Espionage
- Institutional Security Bureau
- List of intelligence agencies
- Intelligence agency
- National Information Service (Brazil)
- Brazilian Federal Police
- National Public Security Force
- Military of Brazil
- Ministry of Defence of Brazil
