= Renata da Silva Souza =

Brazilian politician

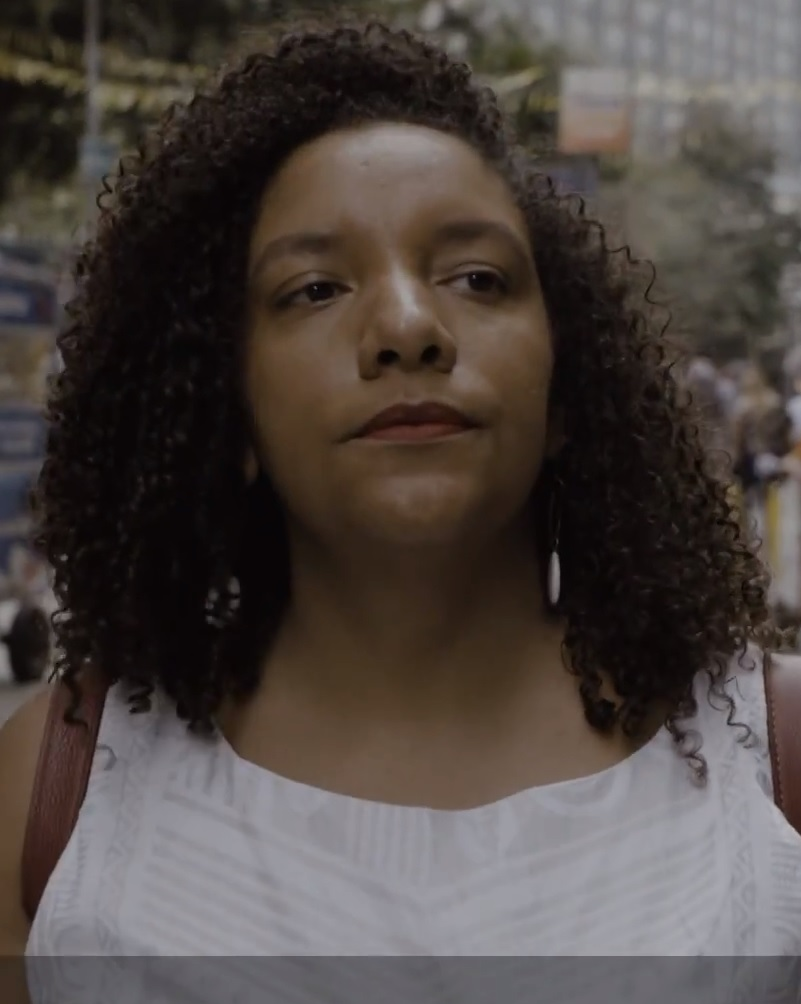

State Deputy in the Legislative Assembly of Rio de Janeiro
- Incumbent
- Assumed office 2018

Personal details
- Born: August 31, 1982 (age 43) Rio de Janeiro, Brazil

Renata da Silva Souza is a Brazilian politician. In 2018, Souza was elected a state deputy in the Legislative Assembly of Rio de Janeiro.
