= Alexandre Ramagem =

Brazilian politician and federal police officer (born 1972)

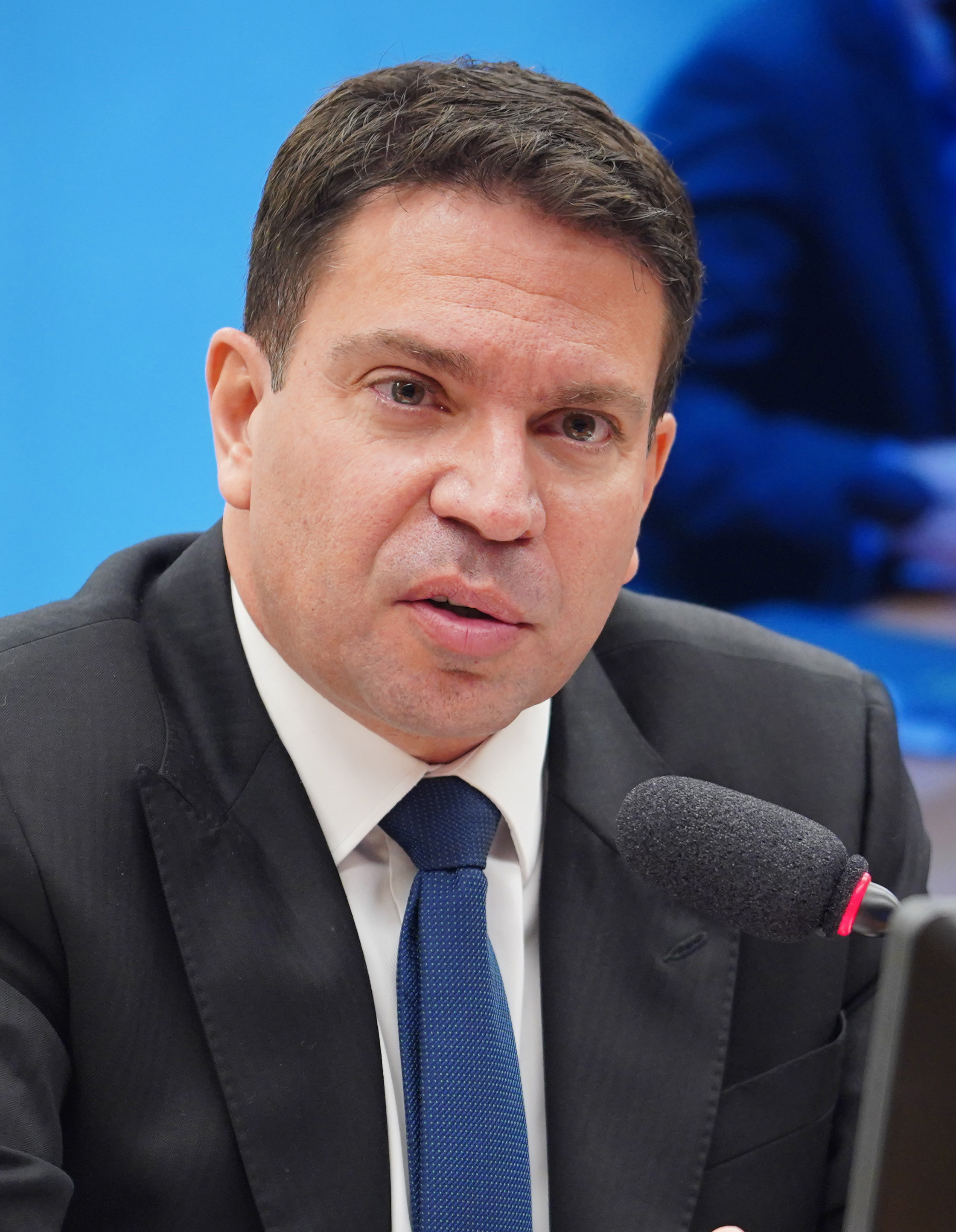

Member of the Chamber of Deputies
- In office 1 February 2023 – 18 December 2025
- Constituency: Rio de Janeiro

Director-General of the Brazilian Intelligence Agency
- In office 11 July 2019 – 31 March 2022
- President: Jair Bolsonaro
- Preceded by: Janér Tesch
- Succeeded by: Luiz Fernando Corrêa

Personal details
- Born: Alexandre Ramagem Rodrigues; 8 May 1972 (age 54) Rio de Janeiro, Brazil
- Party: PL (2022–present)
- Education: Pontifical Catholic University of Rio de Janeiro
- Profession: Federal police officer (expelled)
- Criminal information
- Status: At-large
- Convictions: Attempted violent abolition of the democratic rule of law; Attempted coup d'état; Participation in an armed criminal organization; Qualified damage; Deterioration of protected heritage property
- Trial: Trial for the 2022–2023 Brazilian coup plot (8 – 11 September 2025)
- Penalty: 16 years, 1 month and 15 days in prison
- Wanted by: Federal Police of Brazil
- Wanted since: 26 November 2025
- Time at large: 333 days

Alexandre Ramagem Rodrigues (Note: Portuguese pronunciation: [a.leˈʃɐ̃.dɾi ʁaˈma.ʒẽj̃ ʁoˈdɾi.ɡis]) (born 8 May 1972) is a Brazilian politician and federal police officer. He served under President Jair Bolsonaro as Director of the Brazilian Intelligence Agency from 2019 until 2022. Ramagem was elected to the Chamber of Deputies representing Rio de Janeiro in the 2022 election.

In September 2025, Ramagem was sentenced to 16 years in prison for his role in Bolsonaro's attempted coup, and removed from his seat in the Chamber of Deputies. He fled to the United States before he could be arrested.

== Education ==
Ramagem attended the Pontifical Catholic University of Rio de Janeiro (PUC-Rio), graduating in 2000.

== Career ==
Ramagem was coordinator of the Rio+20, the 2014 FIFA World Cup and the 2016 Summer Olympics. In 2018, Ramagem was security chief of Jair Bolsonaro after he got elected until the date of his inauguration.

Ramagem served as Director-General of the Brazilian Intelligence Agency (ABIN) from 2019 to 2022. In 2024, it was reported that he has been investigated for misusing the powers of the office during his tenure to spy on political opponents.

In 2020, Ramagem was nominated to serve as Director-General of the Federal Police of Brazil, following the dismissal of Director-General Maurício Valeixo, as well as the resignation of Sergio Moro as Minister of Justice and Public Security. His nomination was made official on 28 April 2020, but his swearing-in was suspended by the Supreme Federal Court a day later, with Supreme Court Justice Alexandre de Moraes citing "abuse of power through misuse of authority", as Ramagem was a close associate of the Bolsonaro family. On the same day, Bolsonaro cancelled his nomination.

Ramagem was elected as a member of the Chamber of Deputies for the state of Rio de Janeiro in 2022 as a member of the Liberal Party. He became a candidate for mayor of Rio de Janeiro in the 2024 election, with Índia Armelau as his vice-mayoral pick.

=== Spy ring and coup convictions ===
In January 2024, computers, phones, and documents were seized from Ramagem's home and offices as part of a federal police investigation into alleged spying. Police claimed that the National Intelligence Centre, a "parallel intelligence agency" set up within ABIN during the Bolsonaro administration, had used Israeli software to monitor 30,000 citizens critical of the government; this included two Supreme Federal Court judges, Alexandre de Moraes and Gilmar Mendes. He was formally indicted in June 2025, with investigators alleging he was responsible for establishing the spy ring and ordering the use of geolocation software to track government opponents.

On 11 September 2025, Ramagem was convicted in a 4-to-1 vote by the Supreme Federal Court of multiple crimes, including participation in the 2022–2023 Brazilian coup plot. He was sentenced to 16 years, 1 month and 15 days in prison; he was also removed from his positions as a Federal Police delegate and deputy in the National Congress.

==== Flight to the United States ====
Before he could be arrested, Ramagem secretly fled to the United States, despite a prohibition on leaving the country by the Supreme Federal Court. Federal police believed he had taken a plane to Boa Vista, Roraima, then rented a car and drove across the border to either Venezuela or Guyana, eventually arriving in Miami, Florida. The Brazilian government filed an extradition request for Ramagem on 30 December 2025. Ramagem claimed that the US government had consented to his fleeing there, quoting an unnamed US official as saying: "It's good that we have a friend who is safe, safe, here in the United States".

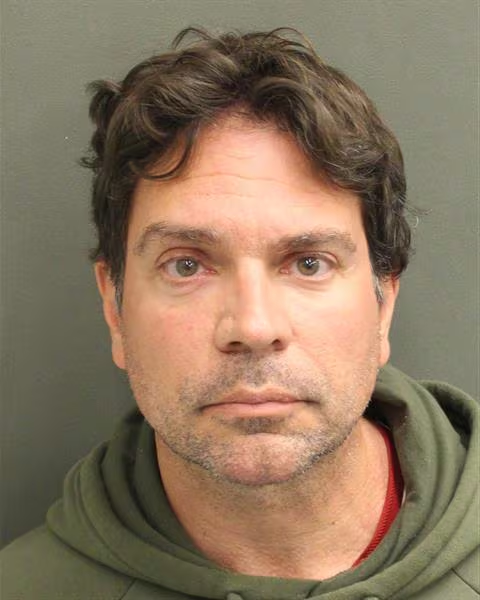
Ramagem after being arrested on 13 April 2026.

On 13 April 2026, Ramagem was arrested in the US by Immigration and Customs Enforcement. He had reportedly been detained by police in Orlando for a traffic offense and later referred to immigration while in custody. According to Paulo Figueiredo, Ramagem had filed an application for asylum which was still outstanding at the time of his arrest. Ramagem was released from ICE custody on 16 April after three days of detention.

== Notes ==
Government offices
Preceded by Janér Tesch	Director-General of the Brazilian Intelligence Agency; 2019–2022	Succeeded by Luiz Fernando Corrêa
