= Carlo Caiado =

Brazilian politician (born 1981)

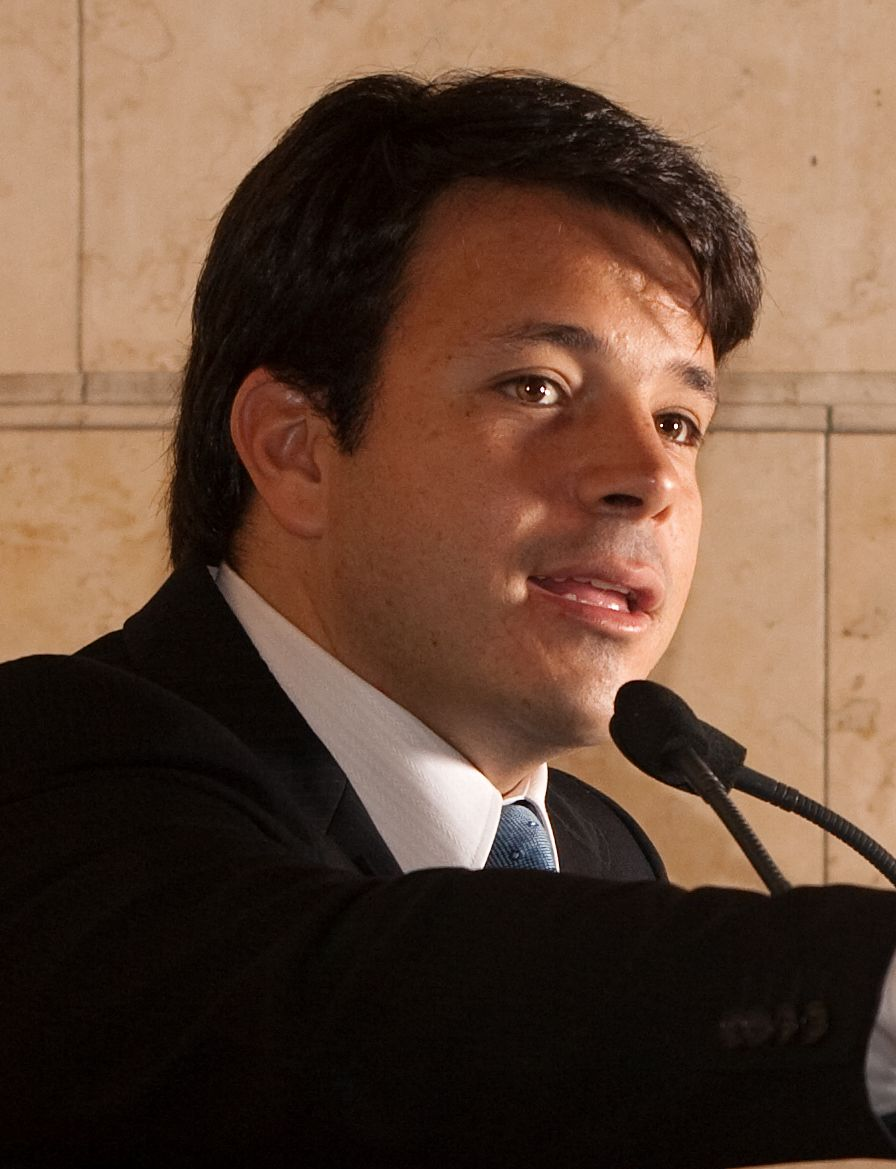
- Caiado in 2019

President of the Municipal Chamber of Rio de Janeiro
- Incumbent
- Assumed office 1 January 2021
- Preceded by: Jorge Felippe

Personal details
- Born: 9 January 1981 (age 45)
- Party: Social Democratic Party (since 2022)
- Relatives: Ronaldo Caiado (third cousin)

Carlo Caiado (born 9 January 1981) is a Brazilian politician. He has been a member of the Municipal Chamber of Rio de Janeiro since 2004, and has served as president of the chamber since 2021. From 2019 to 2020, he was a member of the Legislative Assembly of Rio de Janeiro. He is a third cousin of Ronaldo Caiado.
