= Manhumirim =

Brazilian municipality located in the state of Minas Gerais

Coordinates: 20°21′28″S 41°57′28″W

- Municipality
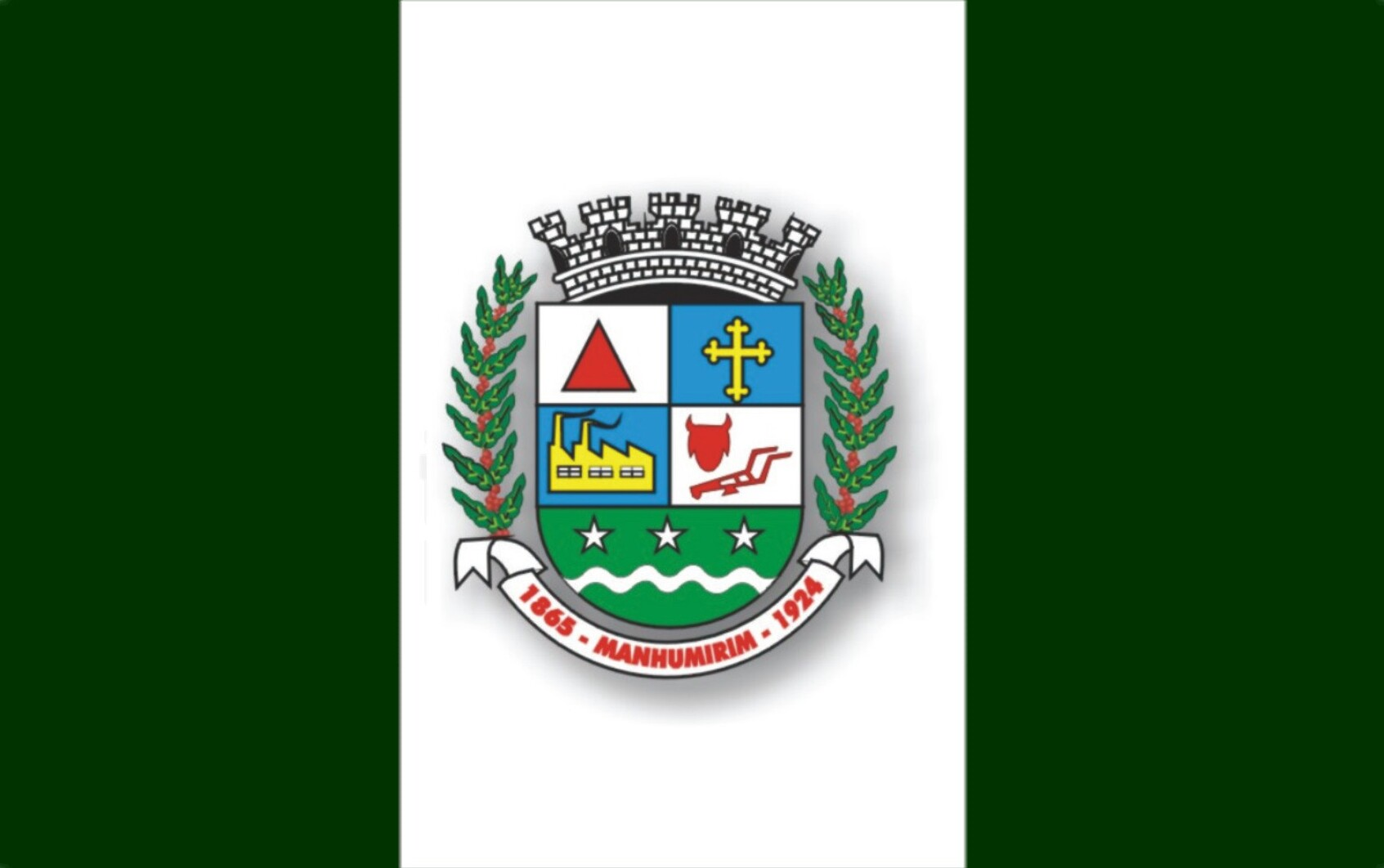
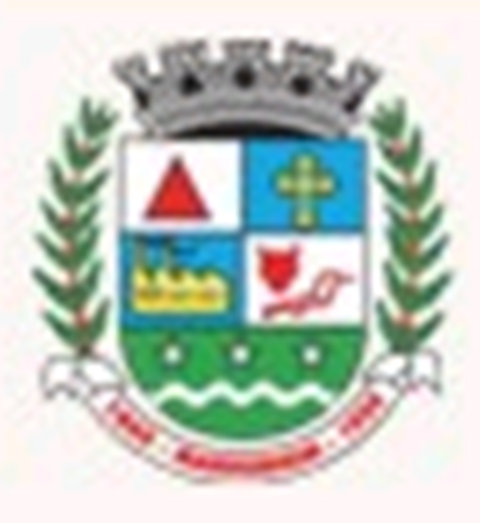
- Flag Coat of arms
- Interactive map of Manhumirim
- Country: Brazil
- State: Minas Gerais
- Region: Southeast
- Time zone: UTC−3 (BRT)

Location of Manhumirim within Minas Gerais

Manhumirim is a Brazilian municipality located in the state of Minas Gerais. The city belongs to the mesoregion of Zona da Mata and to the microregion of Manhuaçu. The city is considered a Transit city. The Omnibus connects Manhumirim to other neighboring cities such as Alto Jequitiba, Alto Caparao, Reducto, and Manhuacu. As of 2020, the estimated population was 22,802.

== See also ==
- List of municipalities in Minas Gerais
