= Municipal Chamber of Rio de Janeiro =

Legislative body of the Municipality of Rio de Janeiro

Municipal Chamber of Rio de Janeiro Câmara Municipal do Rio de Janeiro
- 10th legislature
- Coat of arms of the city of Rio de Janeiro

Type
- Type: Unicameral
- Term limits: None

History
- Founded: 1565
- New session started: January 1, 2023

Leadership
- President: Carlo Caiado, PSD since January 2, 2021

Structure
- Seats: 51
- Length of term: Four years

Elections
- Voting system: Open list proportional representation
- Last election: November 15, 2024
- Next election: 2028

Meeting place
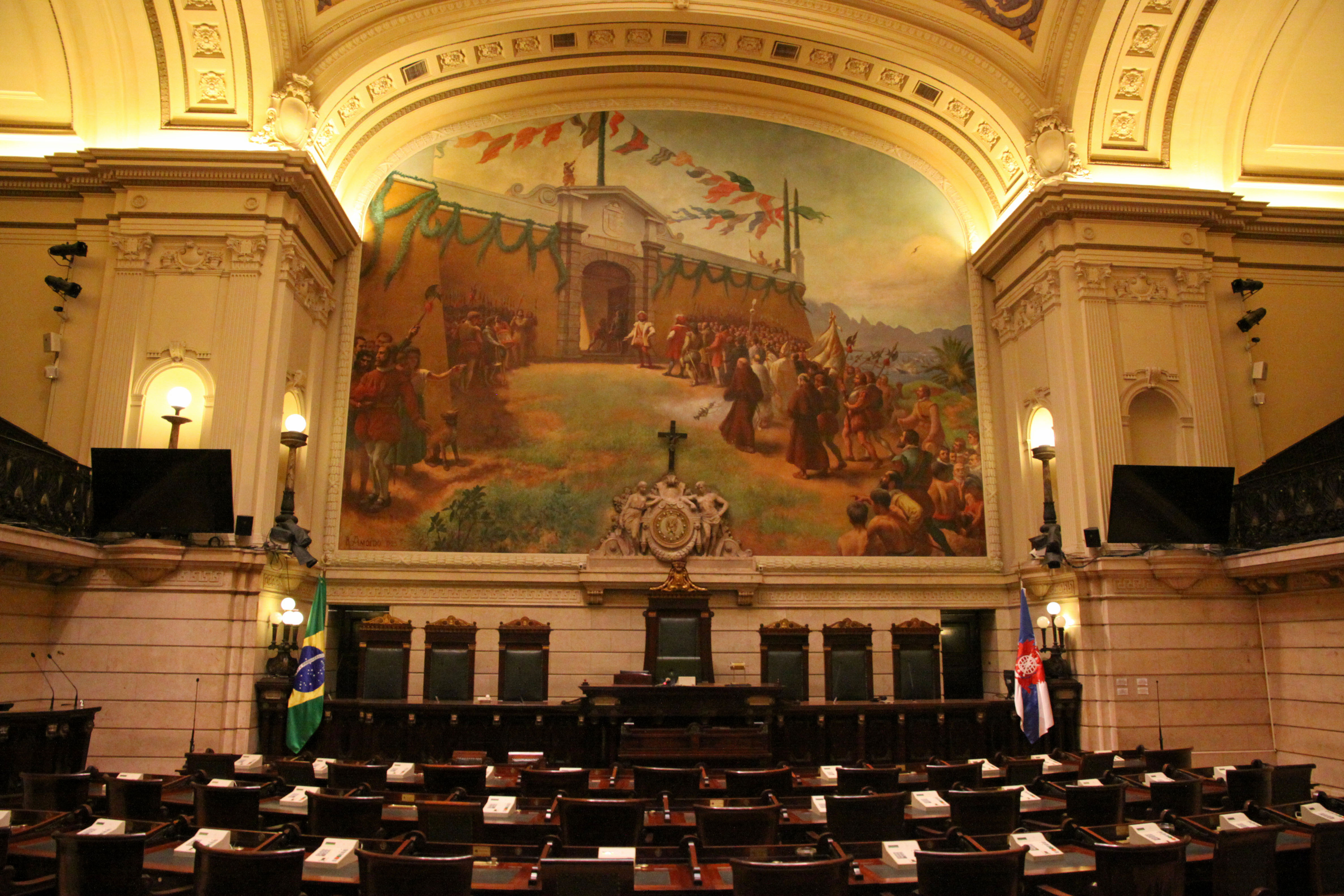
- Pedro Ernesto Palace, Rio de Janeiro, Brazil; 22°54′36″S 43°10′36″W

Website
- http://www.camara.rj.gov.br/

The Municipal Chamber of Rio de Janeiro (Portuguese: Câmara Municipal do Rio de Janeiro) is the unicameral legislative body of the city of Rio de Janeiro. It was founded in 1565 by the Portuguese colonists.
