= 2020 Rio de Janeiro municipal election =

Municipal election in Brazil

- 15 November 2020 (first round); 29 November 2020 (second round)
- 2020 Rio de Janeiro Mayoral election
- Opinion polls
- Turnout: 67.21% (first round); 64.55% (second round)
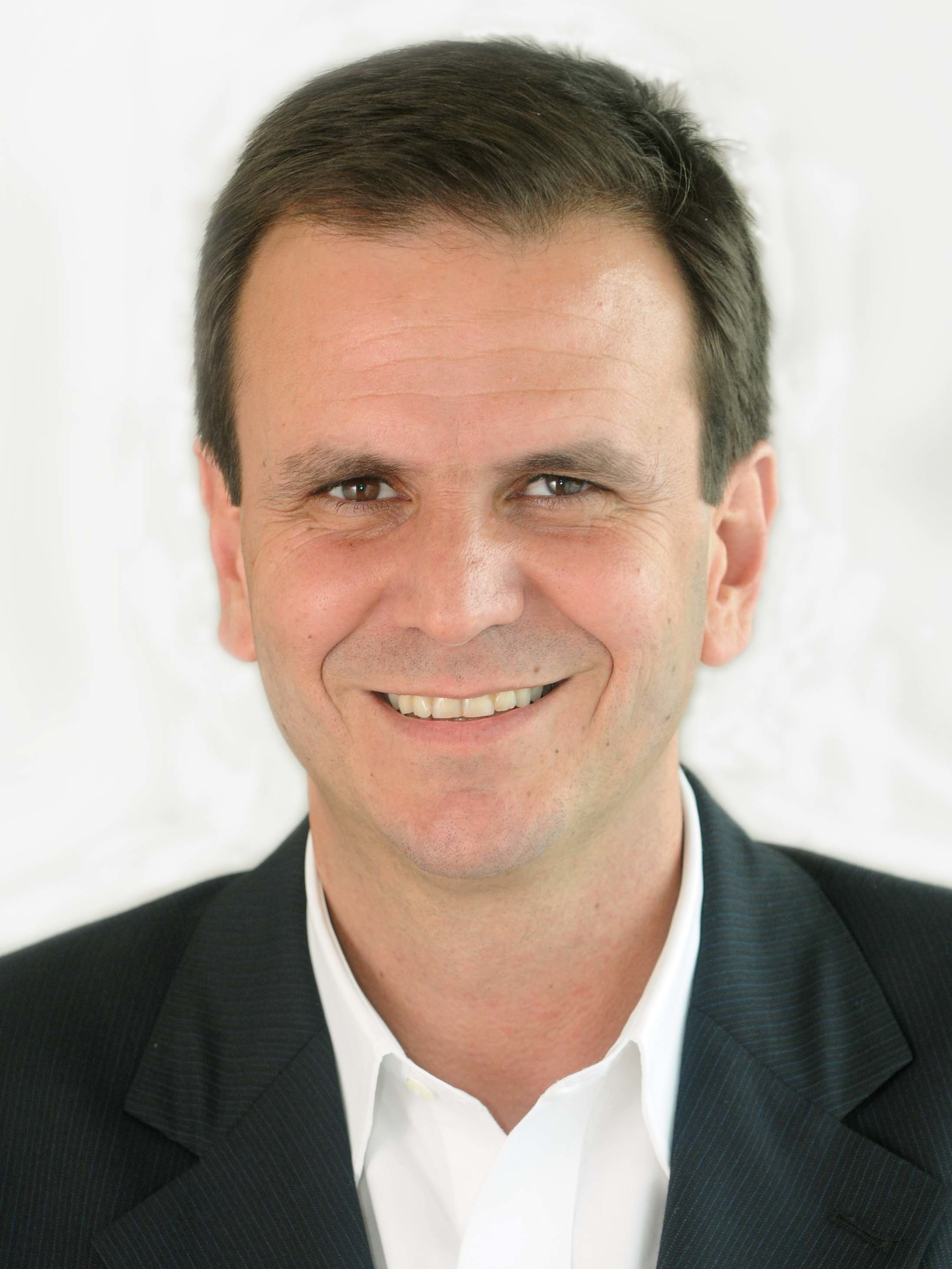

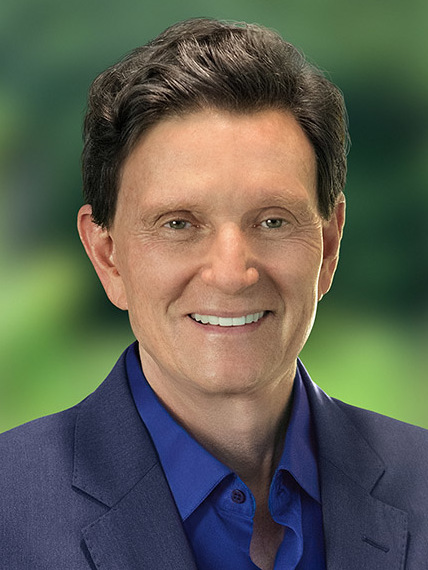
| Candidate | Eduardo Paes | Marcelo Crivella |
| Party | DEM | Republicanos |
| Alliance | The Certainty of a Better Rio | With God, for the Family and for Rio |
| Popular vote | 1,629,319 | 913,700 |
| Percentage | 64.07% | 35.93% |
Mayor before election
Marcelo Crivella
Republicanos
Elected mayor
Eduardo Paes
DEM
- Parliamentary election
| Party | Leader | Vote % | Seats | +/– |
Municipal Chamber
| Republicanos | | 11.07 | 7 | +4 |
| PSOL | Tarcísio Motta | 10.95 | 7 | +1 |
| DEM | | 10.37 | 7 | +3 |
| PSD | | 4.65 | 3 | +1 |
| PT | Reimont Otoni | 4.43 | 3 | +1 |
| Avante | | 4.40 | 3 | +2 |
| PL | | 4.17 | 2 | +2 |
| Cidadania | | 3.81 | 3 | +3 |
| PSC | Elitusalem Gomes | 3.78 | 2 | −1 |
| PTB | | 3.23 | 2 | −1 |
| Solidarity | | 2.89 | 1 | −1 |
| PMN | | 2.75 | 1 | −1 |
| PSL | | 2.53 | 1 | +1 |
| PDT | Fernando William | 2.37 | 1 | −1 |
| PTC | | 2.27 | 1 | +1 |
| DC | | 2.27 | 1 | +1 |
| MDB | | 1.84 | 1 | −9 |
| PSDB | | 0.73 | 0 | −3 |
This lists parties that won seats. See the complete results below.

The 2020 Rio de Janeiro municipal election took place in the city of Rio de Janeiro, Brazil in November 2020 to elect a mayor, a vice mayor, and 51 city councillors for the administration of the city. On the 29 November 2020 run-off election, former mayor Eduardo Paes, of the Democrats (DEM), defeated incumbent mayor Marcelo Crivella of the Republicans (REP), who lost his bid for re-election.

== Candidates ==
=== Candidates in runoff ===
| # | Party | Mayoral candidate | Political office(s) | Vice-Mayoral candidate | Coalition |
|---|---|---|---|---|---|
| 10 | Republicans (REP) | Marcelo Crivella (REP) | Mayor of Rio de Janeiro 2017–present; Senator for Rio de Janeiro 2003–2017, Minister for Fishing and Aquaculture 2012–2014 | Andréa Firmo (REP) | With God, for the Family and for Rio; REP, PATRI, SD, PODE, PP, PRTB, PTC, PMN |
| 25 | Democrats (DEM) | Eduardo Paes (DEM) | Mayor of Rio de Janeiro 2009–2017; State Secretary of Tourism, Sport and Leisure of Rio de Janeiro 2007–2008; Federal Deputy from Rio de Janeiro 1999–2007; City Councillor of Rio de Janeiro 1997–1999; Sub-Mayor of Barra da Tijuca and Jacarepaguá 1993–1997. | Nilton Caldeira (PL) | The Certainty of a Better Rio; DEM, PL, PSDB, PV, DC, AVANTE, CDN |

=== Candidates failing to make runoff ===
| # | Party | Mayoral candidate | Political office(s) | Vice-Mayoral candidate | Coalition |
|---|---|---|---|---|---|
| 12 | Democratic Labour Party (PDT) | Martha Rocha (PDT) | State Deputy of Rio de Janeiro 2015–present | Anderson Quack (PSB) | United for Rio; PDT, PSB |
| 13 | Workers' Party (PT) | Benedita da Silva (PT) | Federal Deputy from Rio de Janeiro 1987–95, 2011–present; Governor of Rio de Janeiro 2002–03; Vice Governor of Rio de Janeiro 1999–2002; Senator for Rio de Janeiro 1995–1998; City Councillor of Rio de Janeiro 1983–1987 | Rejane de Almeida (PCdoB) | It's the People's Time; PT, PCdoB |
| 15 | Brazilian Democratic Movement (MDB) | Paulo Messina (MDB) | City Councillor of Rio de Janeiro 2017–present | Sheila Barbosa (MDB) | MDB |
| 16 | United Socialist Workers' Party (PSTU) | Cyro Garcia (PSTU) | Federal Deputy from Rio de Janeiro 1993; President of the Rio de Janeiro Bank Clerks' Union 1989–1990, 1991–1993, 1996–1997; President of the Rio de Janeiro branch of the United Socialist Workers' Party, 1994–present | Elisa Guimarães (PSTU) | PSTU |
| 17 | Social Liberal Party (PSL) | Luiz Lima (PSL) | Federal Deputy of Rio de Janeiro 2019–present | Fernando Veloso (PSD) | Rio Has Options; PSL, PSD |
| 18 | Sustainability Network (REDE) | Eduardo Bandeira de Mello (REDE) | President of Flamengo Rowing Club 2013–2018 | Andrea Gouvêa Vieira (REDE) | REDE |
| 20 | Social Christian Party (PSC) | Glória Heloiza (PSC) | Judge of the 2nd Court of the Childhood, Youth and the Elderly of the Justice Court of Rio de Janeiro 1996–2020 | Mauro Santos (PSC) | Social Christian Party (PSC) |
| 29 | Workers' Cause Party (PCO) | Henrique Simonard (PCO) | Student activist | Caetano Sigiliano (PCO) | PCO |
| 30 | New Party (NOVO) | Fred Luz (NOVO) | CEO of Flamengo Rowing Club 2014–2018 | Giselle Gomes (NOVO) | NOVO |
| 35 | Brazilian Woman's Party (PMB) | Sued Haidar (PMB) | President of the Party of the Brazilian Woman 2015–present | Jéssica Natalino (PMB) | PMB |
| 50 | Socialism and Liberty Party (PSOL) | Renata Souza (PSOL) | State Deputy of Rio de Janeiro 2019–present | Íbis Silva Pereira (PSOL) | A Rio of Hope; PSOL, PCB, UP |
| 90 | Republican Party of the Social Order (PROS) | Clarissa Garotinho (PROS) | Federal Deputy from Rio de Janeiro 2015–present; State Secretary for Development, Employment and Innovation 2017–2018; State Deputy of Rio de Janeiro 2011–2015; City Councillor of Rio de Janeiro 2009–2011 | Jorge Coutinho (PROS) | PROS |

=== Withdrawn candidates ===
- Alessandro Molon (PSB) - Federal Deputy from Rio de Janeiro since 2011; State Deputy of Rio de Janeiro 2003–2011. Candidate for Mayor of Rio de Janeiro in 2016.
- Arolde de Oliveira (PSD) - Senator from Rio de Janeiro since 2019; Federal Deputy from Rio de Janeiro 1984–2019.
- Bruno Kazuhiro (DEM) - National President of the Democrats' Youth since 2014.
- Cabo Daciolo (PL) - Federal Deputy from Rio de Janeiro 2015−2019. Candidate for President of Brazil in 2018.
- Carlo Caiado (DEM) - City Councillor of Rio de Janeiro 2013–2019; State Deputy of Rio de Janeiro since 2019.
- Hélio Lopes (PSL) - Federal Deputy from Rio de Janeiro since 2019.
- Hugo Leal (PSD) - Federal Deputy for Rio de Janeiro 2007–present; State Deputy of Rio de Janeiro 1999–2006.
- Luiz Paulo Corrêa da Silva (PSDB) - State Deputy of Rio de Janeiro since 2003; Vice Governor of Rio de Janeiro 1995–1999.
- Marcelo Calero (CDN) - Federal Deputy from Rio de Janeiro since 2019; Minister of Culture 2016.
- Marcelo Freixo (PSOL) - Federal Deputy from Rio de Janeiro since 2019; State Deputy of Rio de Janeiro 2007–2019.
- Mariana Ribas (PSDB) - Municipal Secretary of Culture of Rio de Janeiro; Director of Ancine 2018−2019.
- Otoni de Paula (PSC) - Federal Deputy from Rio de Janeiro since 2019; City Councillor of Rio de Janeiro 2017–2019.
- Paulo Marinho (PSDB) - Businessman.
- Paulo Rabello de Castro (PSC) - Former president of BNDES 2017–2018; former president of IBGE 2016–2017.
- Pedro Fernandes Neto (PSC) - State Secretary of Education of Rio de Janeiro since 2019; State Deputy of Rio de Janeiro 2007–2019; Municipal Secretary of Social Assistance and Human Rights of Rio de Janeiro 2017–2018; State Secretary of Science, Technology, Innovation and Social Development of Rio de Janeiro 2017; State Secretary of Social Assistance and Human Rights of Rio de Janeiro 2014, 2017; Municipal Secretary of the Environment of Rio de Janeiro 2008.
- Rodrigo Amorim (PSL - State Deputy of Rio de Janeiro since 2019.
- Indio da Costa (Independent) - Federal Deputy from Rio de Janeiro 2007–2011, 2015–2019; Municipal Secretary of Urbanism, Infrastructure and Housing of Rio de Janeiro 2017–2018; Municipal Secretary of Administration of Rio de Janeiro 2001–2006; City Councillor of Rio de Janeiro 1997–2006.
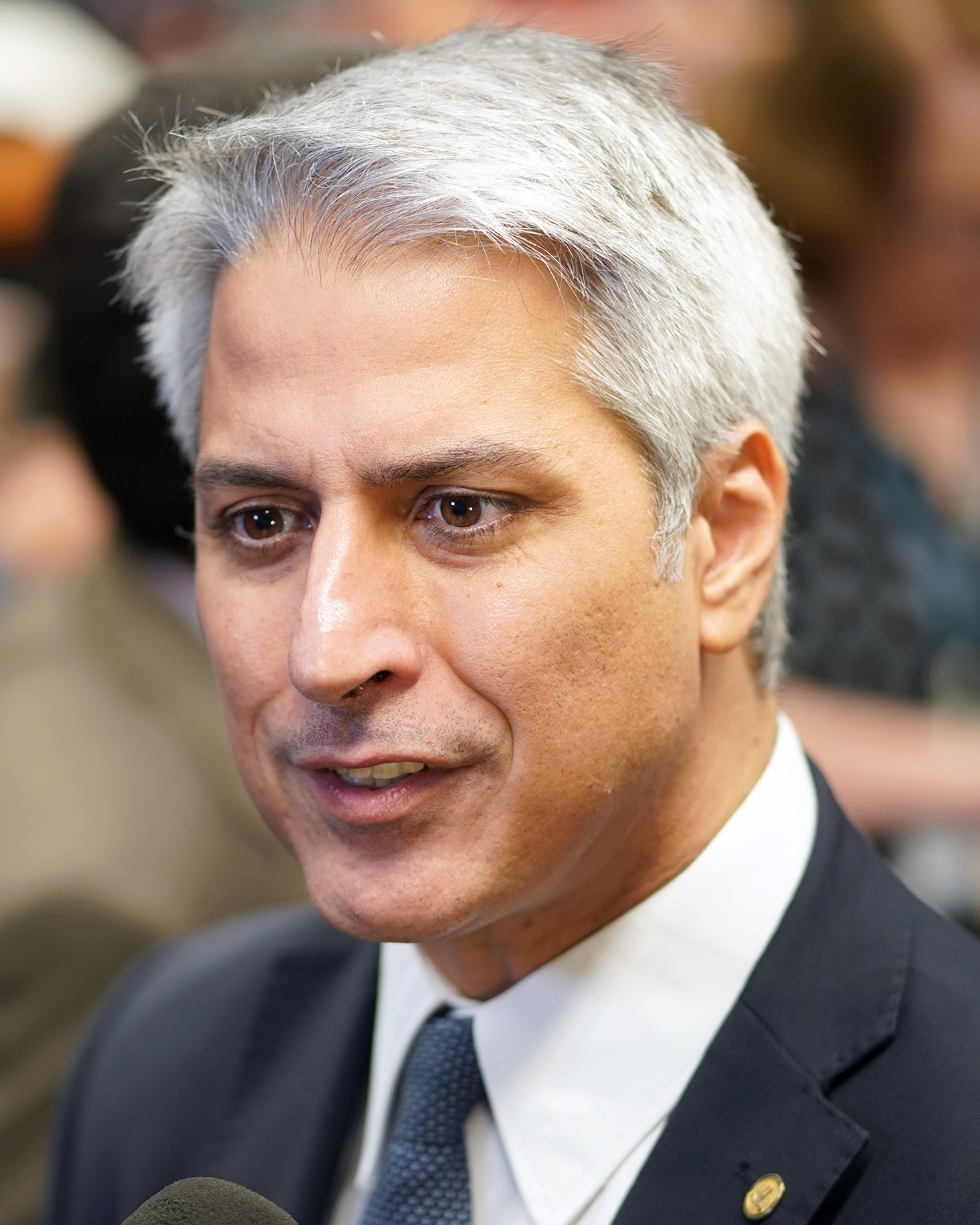
Federal Deputy
Alessandro Molon (PSB)
from Belo Horizonte

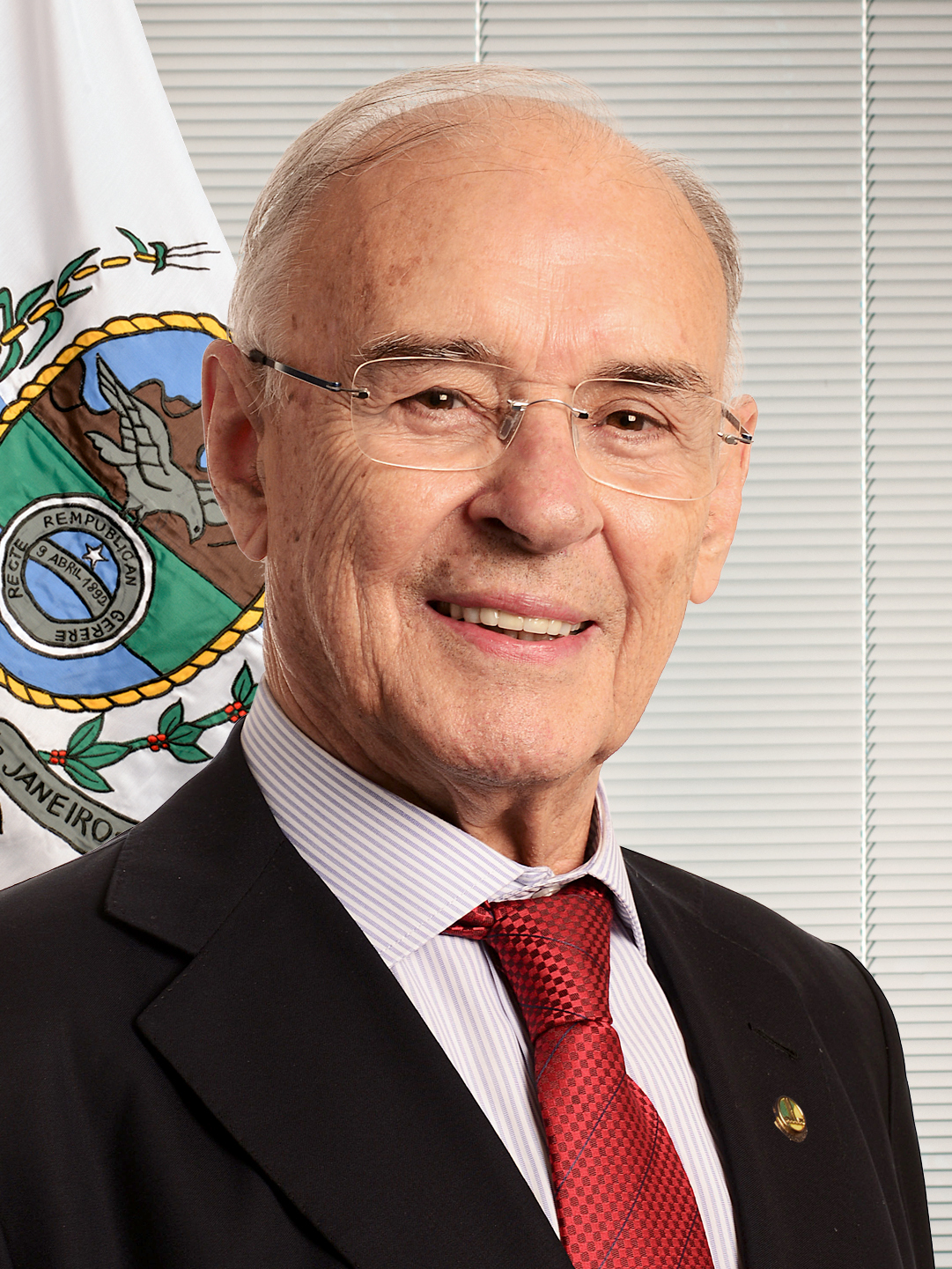
Senator
Arolde de Oliveira (PSD)
from São Luiz Gonzaga

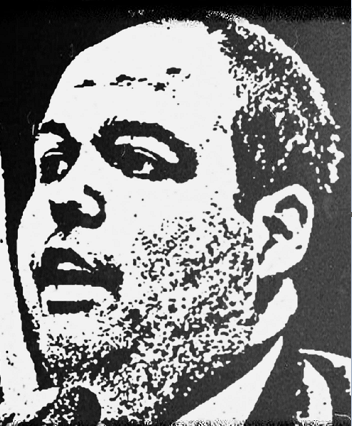
President of Democrats' Youth
Bruno Kazuhiro (DEM)
from Rio de Janeiro

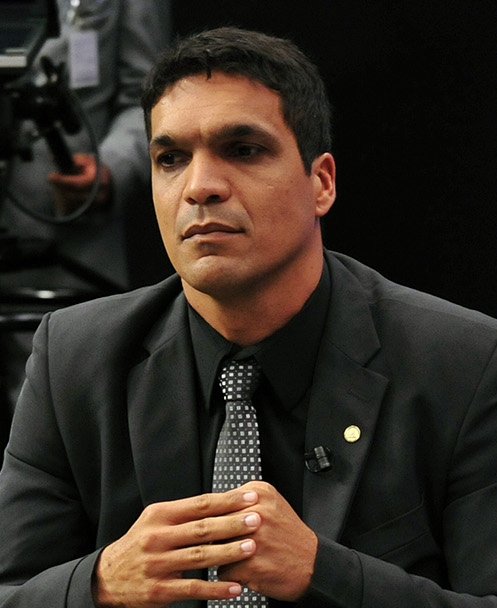
Former Federal Deputy
Cabo Daciolo (PL)
from Florianópolis

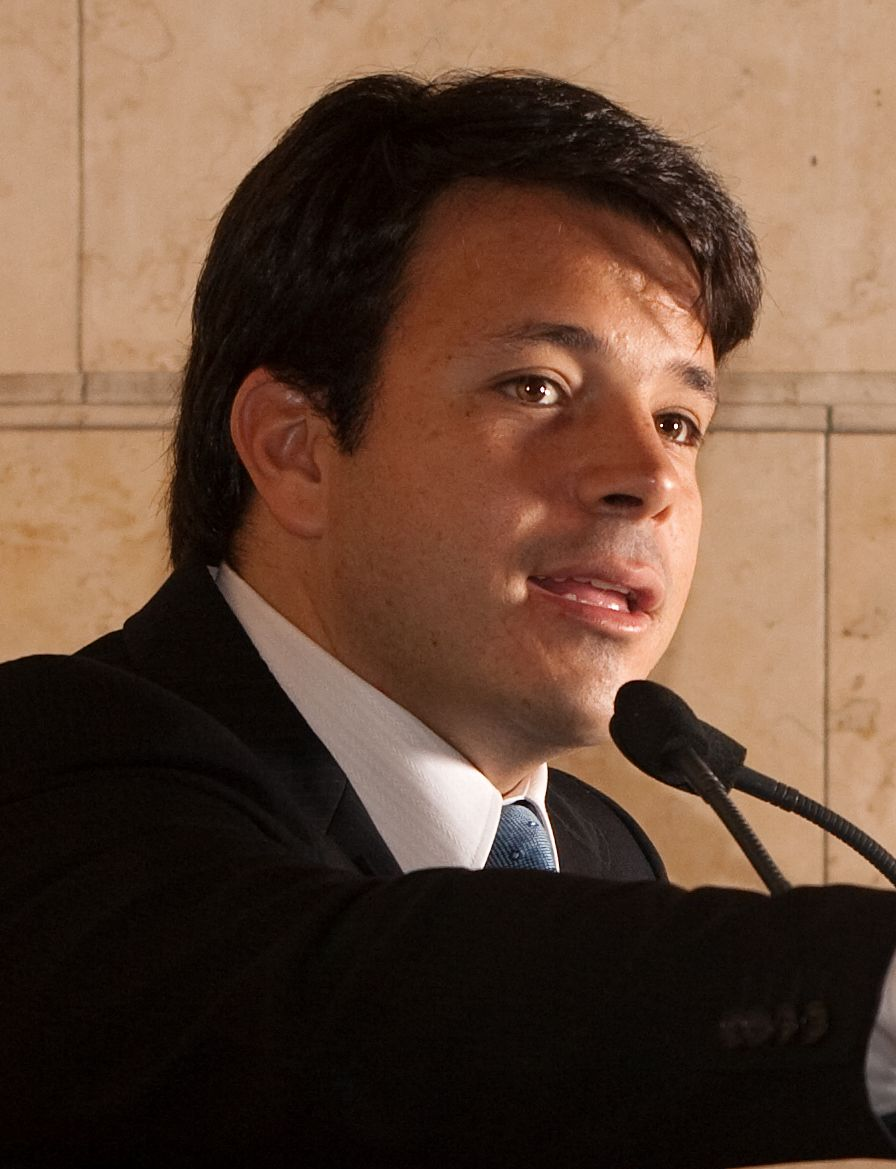
State Deputy
Carlo Caiado (DEM)
from Goiânia

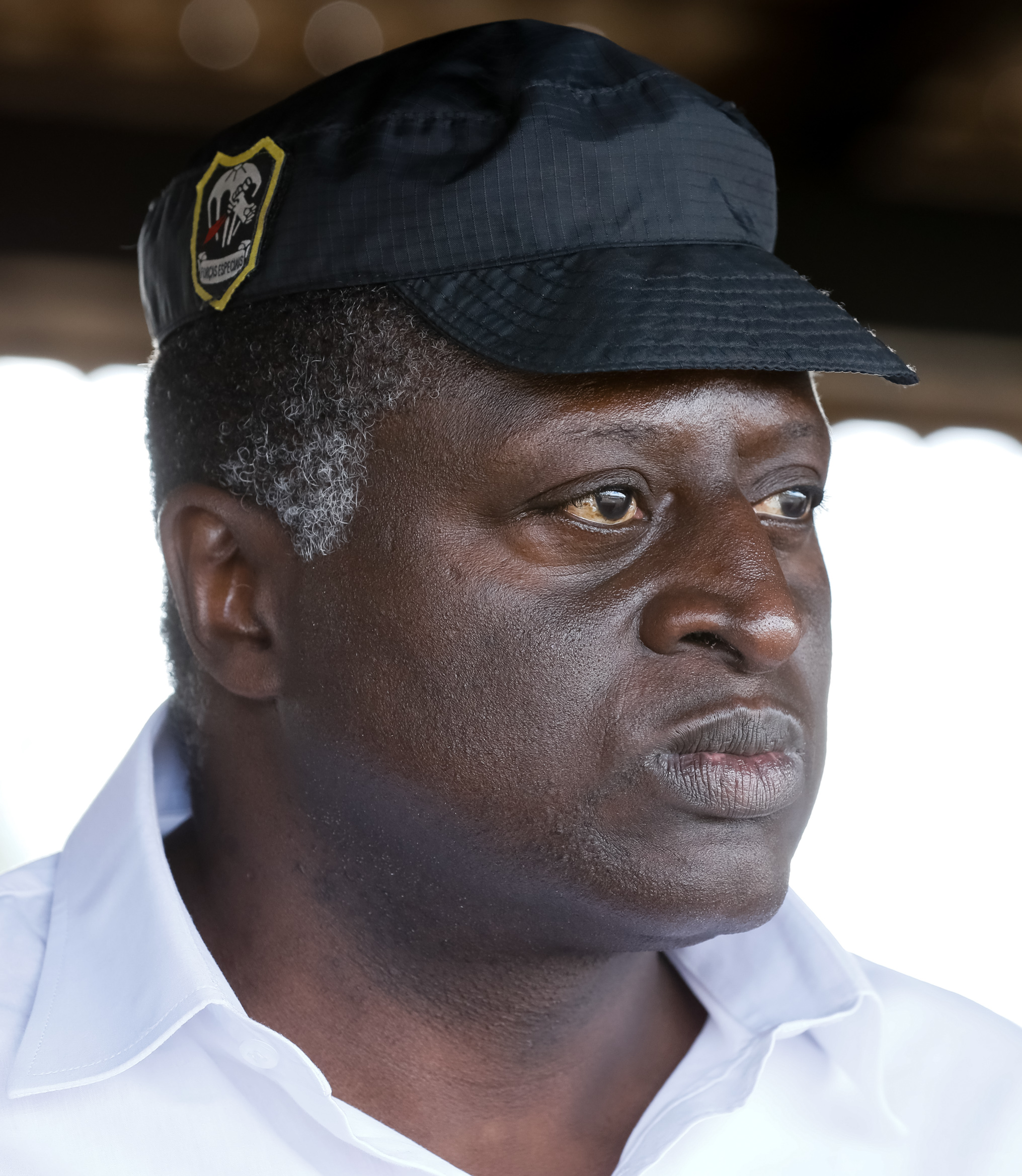
Federal Deputy
Hélio Lopes (PSL)
from Rio de Janeiro

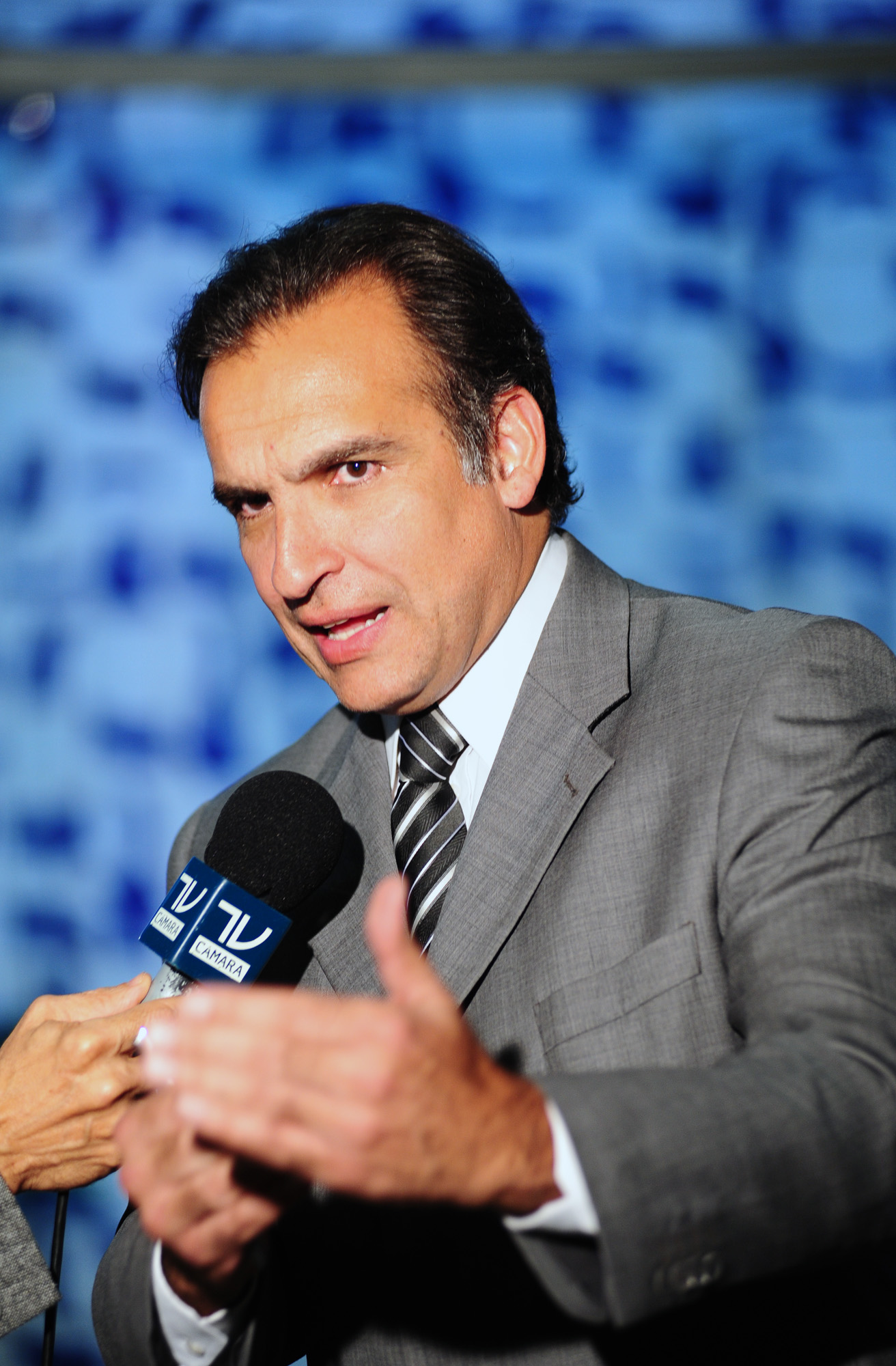
Federal Deputy
Hugo Leal (PSD)
from Rio de Janeiro

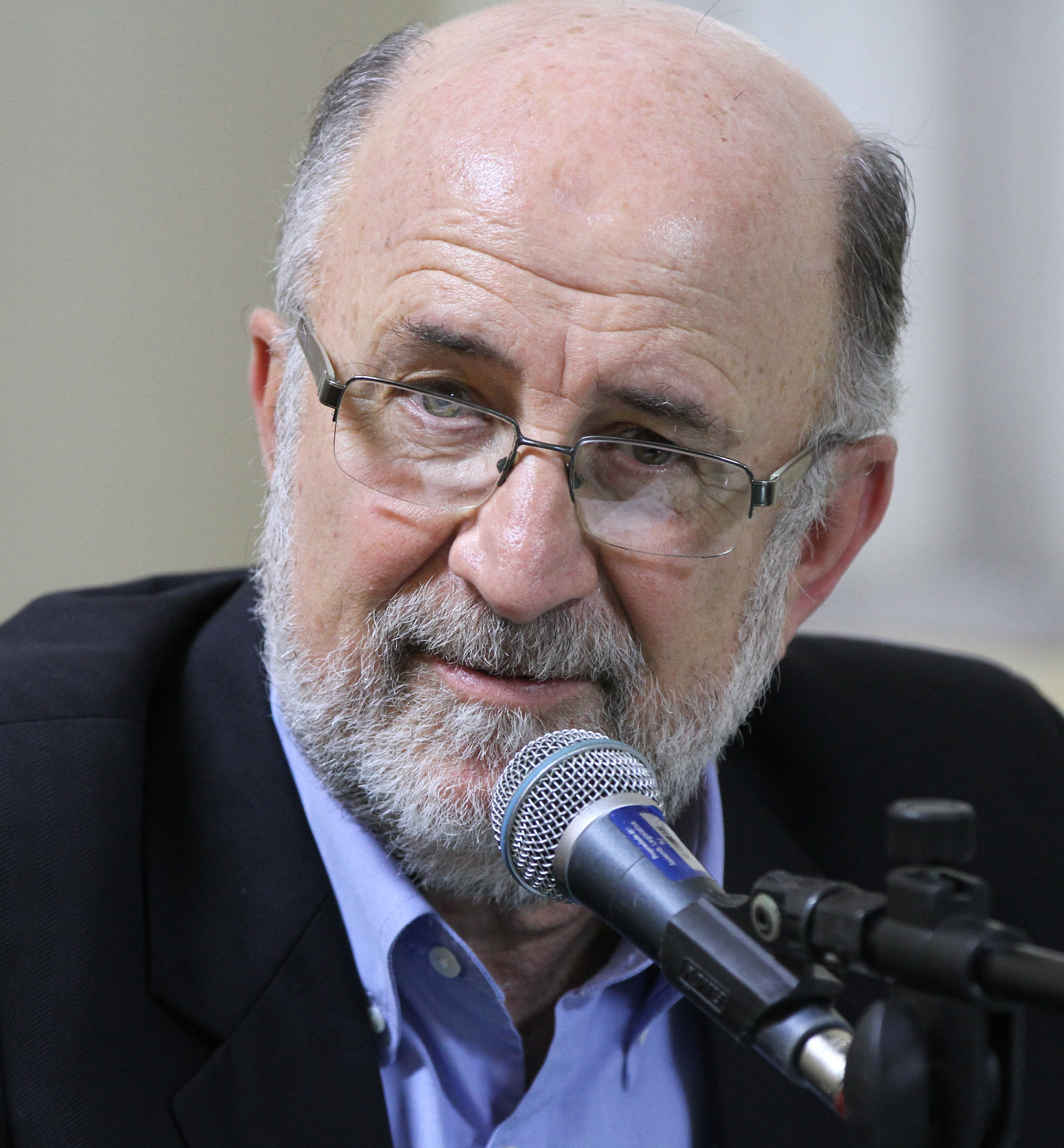
State Deputy
Luiz Paulo Corrêa da Rocha (PSDB)
from Rio de Janeiro

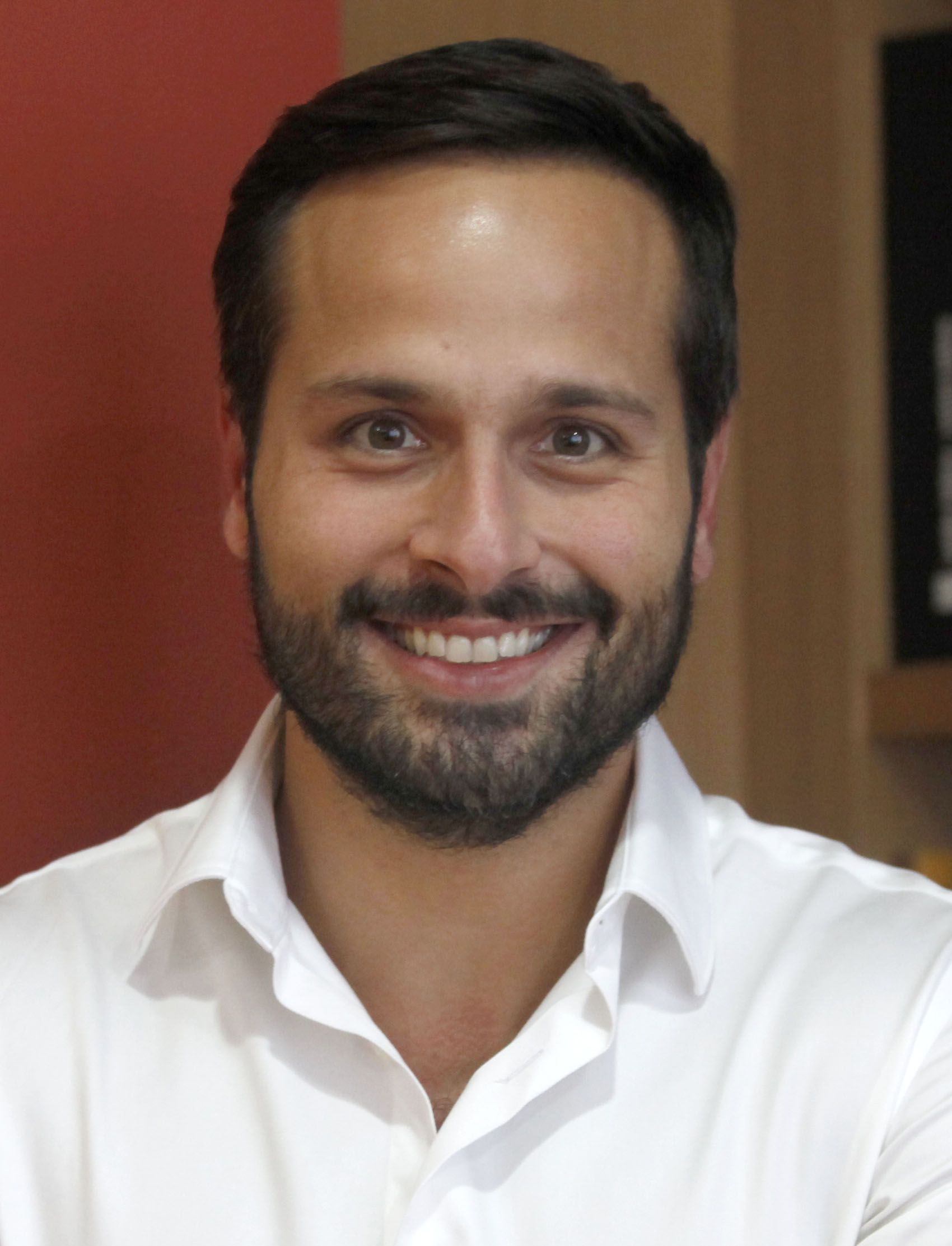
Federal Deputy
Marcelo Calero (CDN)
from Rio de Janeiro

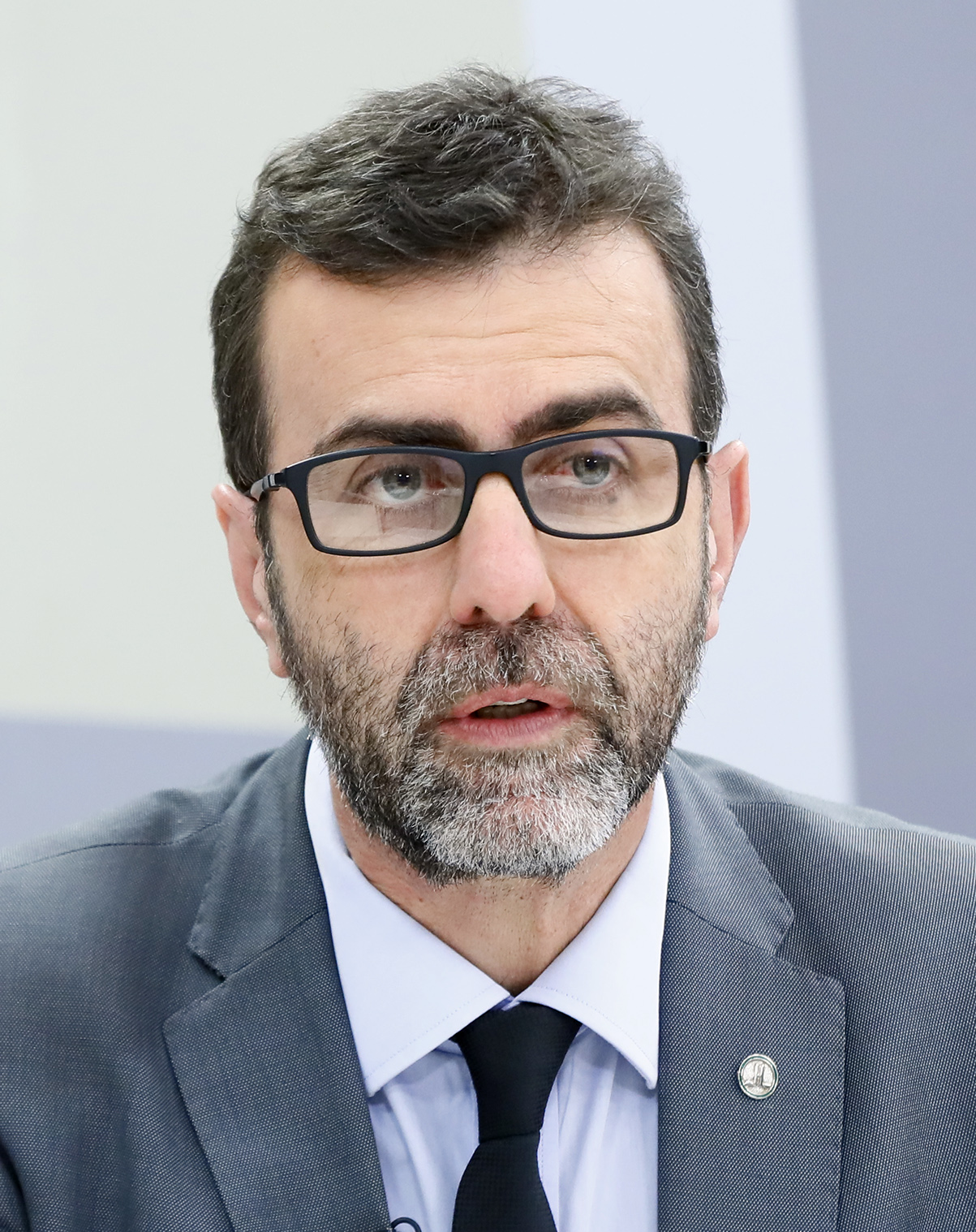
Federal Deputy
Marcelo Freixo (PSOL)
from São Gonçalo

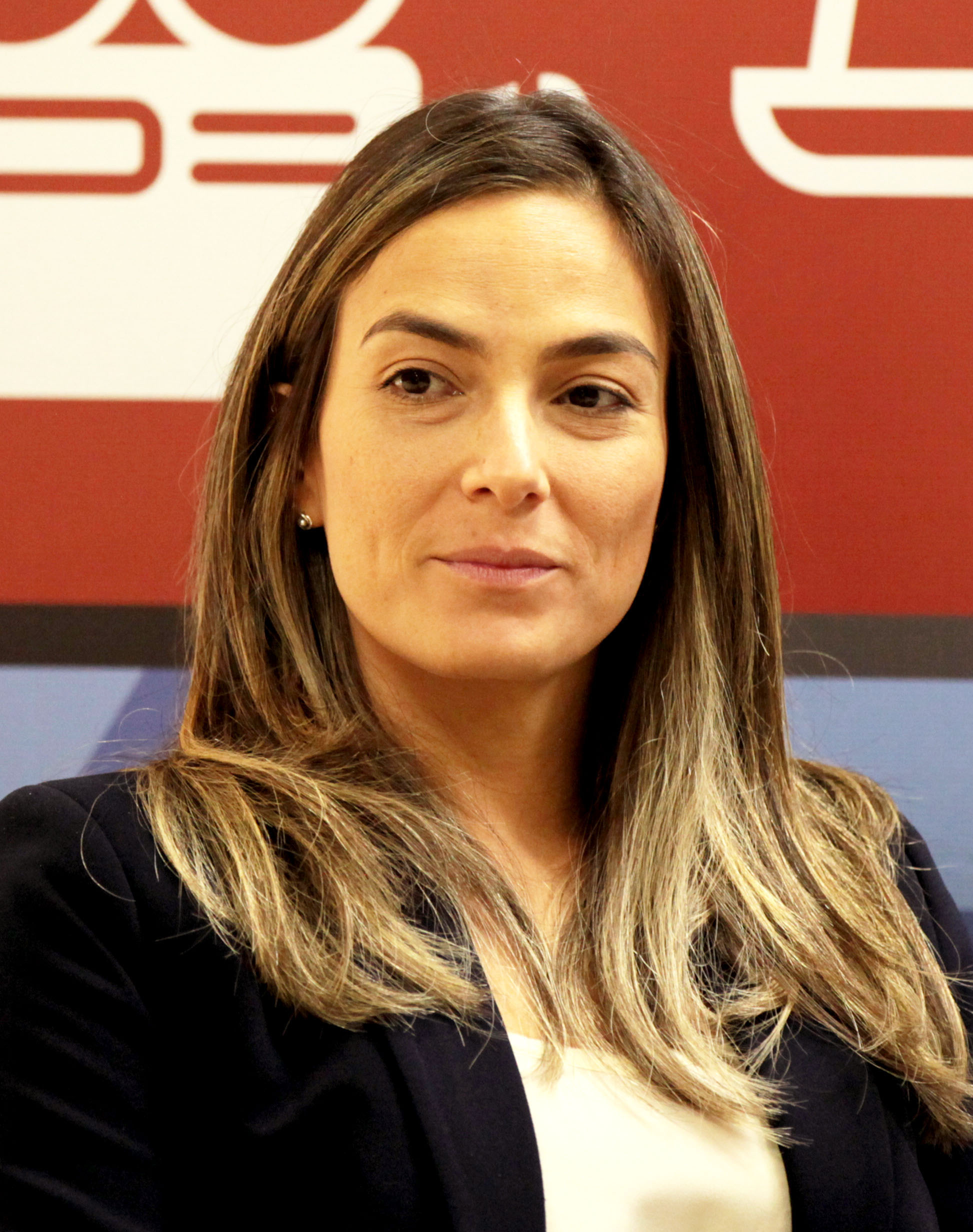
Former Municipal Secretary
Mariana Ribas (PSDB)
from Rio de Janeiro

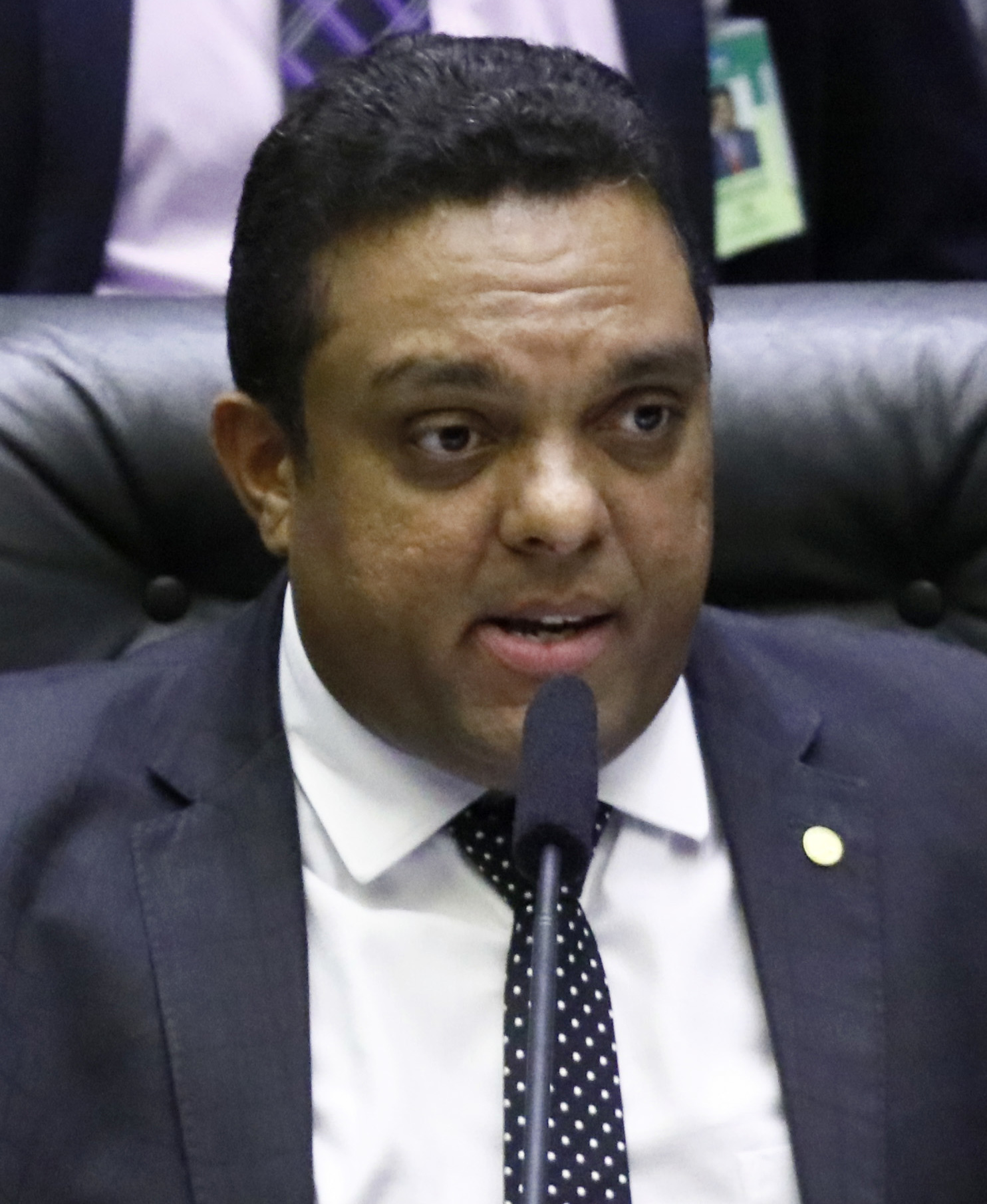
Federal Deputy
Otoni de Paula (PL)
from Niterói

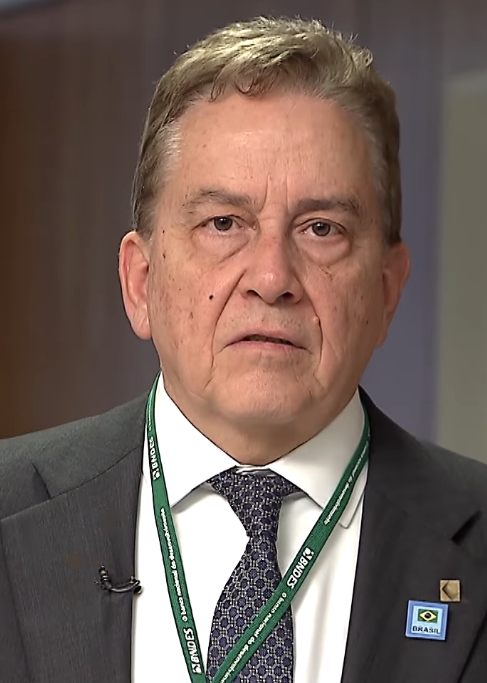
Former President of BNDES
Paulo Rabello de Castro (PSC)
from Rio de Janeiro

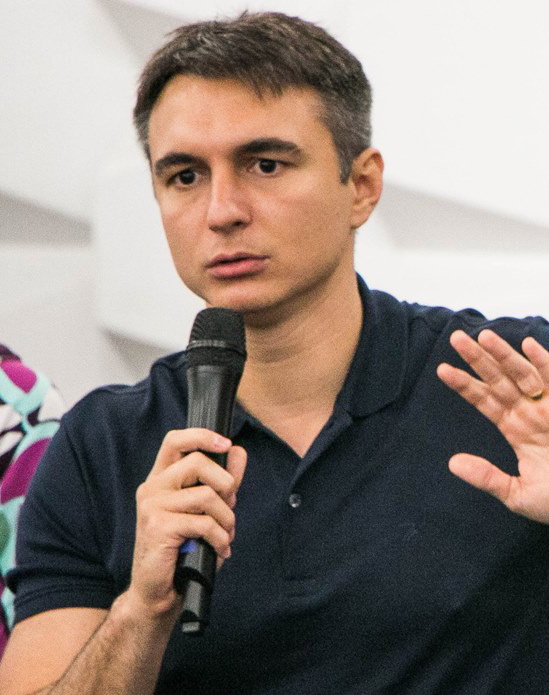
State Secretary of Education
Pedro Fernandes Neto (PSC)
from Rio de Janeiro

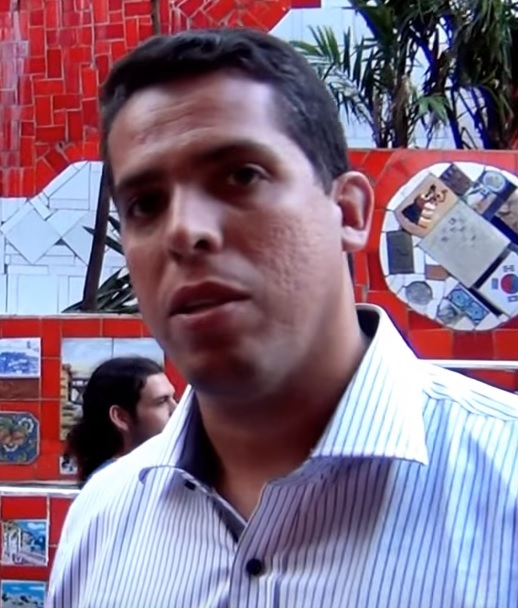
State Deputy
Rodrigo Amorim (PSL)
from Rio de Janeiro

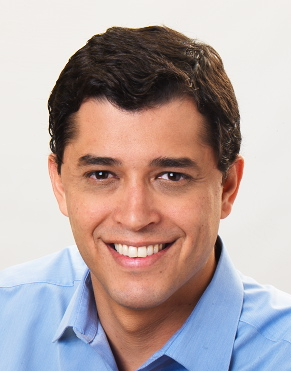
Former Federal Deputy
Indio da Costa
from Rio de Janeiro

== Opinion polls ==
Polling aggregates
- Active candidates
- Eduardo Paes (DEM)
- Marcelo Crivella (REP)
- Martha Rocha (PDT)
- Benedita da Silva (PT)
- Luiz Lima (PSL)
- Renata Souza (PSOL)
- Others
- Abstentions/Undecided

View source data.

=== First round ===
==== Published after the campaign's start ====
| Pollster/client(s) | Date(s) conducted | Sample size | Paes DEM | Crivella REP | Rocha PDT | Silva PT | Mello REDE | Garotinho PROS | Lima PSL | Souza PSOL | Garcia PSTU | Messina MDB | Luz NOVO | Heloiza PSC | Haidar PMB | Simonard PCO | Abst. Undec. | Lead |
|---|---|---|---|---|---|---|---|---|---|---|---|---|---|---|---|---|---|---|
| 2020 Election | 15 Nov | 2,633,322 | 37.01% | 21.90% | 11.30% | 11.27% | 2.48% | 0.46% | 6.85% | 3.24% | 0.11% | 2.93% | 1.76% | 0.52% | 0.15% | 0.02% | 19.23% | 15.11% |
| Ibope (exit poll) | 15 Nov (Note: Exit poll conducted on election day.) | 5,000 | 33% | 17% | 9% | 12% | 2% | 1% | 5% | 2% | <1% | 2% | 1% | <1% | <1% | <1% | 15% | 16% |
| IBOPE | 12–14 Nov | 1,204 | 35% | 14% | 9% | 11% | 3% | 0% | 5% | 2% | 0% | 2% | 2% | 0% | 0% | 0% | 16% | 21% |
| Paraná Pesquisas | 29 Oct–1 Nov | 910 | 27.7% | 14.1% | 14% | 8.2% | 3.2% | 1.2% | 4.2% | 1.9% | 0.7% | 1.2% | 1.2% | 0.4% | 0.2% | 0.1% | 21.8% | 13.6% |
| RealTime BigData | 26–28 Oct | 1,000 | 31% | 12% | 13% | 10% | 3% | 3% | 4% | 4% | 0% | 1% | 2% | 0% | 0% | 1% | 15% | 18% |
| IBOPE | 28–30 Oct | 1,204 | 32% | 14% | 14% | 9% | 2% | 0% | 4% | 2% | 0% | 1% | 1% | 0% | 0% | 0% | 20% | 18% |
| Datafolha | 20–21 Oct | 1,008 | 28% | 13% | 13% | 10% | 3% | 1% | 4% | 5% | 2% | 0% | 1% | 1% | 0% | 0% | 20% | 15% |
| RealTime BigData | 14–17 Oct | 1,050 | 31% | 11% | 9% | 7% | 3% | 1% | 2% | 2% | 0% | 1% | 1% | 0% | 0% | 0% | 32% | 20% |
| IBOPE | 13–15 Oct | 1,001 | 30% | 12% | 8% | 7% | 3% | 1% | 3% | 3% | 2% | 1% | 0% | 0% | - | 0% | 28% | 18% |
| RealTime Big Data | 13–15 Oct | 1,000 | 31% | 15% | 12% | 10% | 5% | 3% | 2% | 3% | 0% | 1% | 1% | 0% | <1% | <1% | 24% | 16% |
| DataFolha | 5–6 Oct | 900 | 30% | 14% | 10% | 8% | 3% | 1% | 1% | 3% | 2% | 1% | 1% | <1% | <1% | <1% | 25% | 16% |
| IBOPE | 30 Sep–2 Oct | 805 | 27% | 12% | 8% | 7% | 2% | 2% | 1% | 2% | 3% | <1% | <1% | <1% | <1% | <1% | 35% | 15% |
| Exame/Ideia | 25–29 Sep | 800 | 26% | 17% | 12% | 10% | 4% | 2% | 1% | 2% | 1% | 1% | 1% | 1% | 1% | 0% | 22% | 9% |
| Paraná Pesquisas | 20–24 Sep | 910 | 25.1% | 13.6% | 11.8% | 7.3% | 3.6% | 2.2% | 1.9% | 1,6% | 1.0% | 0.9% | 0.8% | 0.7% | 0.7% | 0.1% | 28.0% | 11.5% |

==== Published before the campaign's start ====
| Pollster/client(s) | Date(s) conducted | Sample size | Paes DEM | Crivella REP | Rocha PDT | Daciolo PL | Alencar PSOL | Motta PSOL | Freixo PSOL | Molon PSB/REDE | Mello REDE | Silva PT | Others | Abst. Undec. | Lead |
|---|---|---|---|---|---|---|---|---|---|---|---|---|---|---|---|
| Paraná Pesquisas | 15–19 Aug | 910 | 29.5% | 15.7% | 10.1% | 5.2% | - | – | - | – | - | 7.4% | 7.7% | 24.5% | 14.5% |
| Paraná Pesquisas | 15–19 Aug | 910 | 28.6% | 15.4% | 9.3% | 5.1% | – | – | - | - | - | 7.0% | 11.9% | 22.9% | 13.2% |
| Instituto VER | 20–23 May | 1,000 | 31.3% | 10.8% | 6.8% | – | 4.5% | – | – | 2.9% | – | 2.1% | 2.2% | 39.3% | 20.5% |
| Instituto VER | 20–23 May | 1,000 | 25.1% | 9.6% | 6.0% | – | – | 3.8% | – | 3.1% | – | 6.6% | 1.5% | 42.8% | 15.5% |
| 15 Mar 2020 | | Marcelo Freixo drops out of the race | | | | | | | | | | | | | |
| Paraná Pesquisas | 14–19 Mar | 910 | 27.9% | 13.1% | 10.1% | – | – | – | 13.4% | – | 3.6% | 4.3% | 7.5% | 20.9% | 14.5% |
| Paraná Pesquisas | 14–19 Mar | 910 | 29.5% | 13.1% | 12.0% | – | – | – | 14.5% | – | 4.3% | – | 4.0% | 22.6% | 15.0% |
| Datafolha | 11–13 Dec 2019 | 872 | 22% | 8% | 7% | – | – | – | 18% | 2% | 6% | 4% | 5% | 27% | 3% |
| 2016 election | 2 Oct 2016 | – | – | 27.78% | – | – | – | – | 18.26% | 1.43% | – | – | 52.50% | 18.27% | 9.52% |

=== Second round ===
| Pollster/client(s) | Date(s) conducted | Sample size | Paes DEM | Crivella REP | Abst. Undec. | Lead |
|---|---|---|---|---|---|---|
| 2020 election | 29 Nov | – | 64.07% | 35.93% | 18.80% | 28.14% |
| Ibope | 23–25 Nov | 1,001 | 53% | 28% | 19% | 25% |
| Datafolha | 16–18 Nov | 1,254 | 54% | 21% | 25% | 33% |
| Ibope | 16–18 Nov | 1,001 | 53% | 23% | 23% | 30% |
| RealTime Big Data/CNN Brasil | 16–17 Nov | 1,050 | 71% | 29% | – | 43% |

== Debates ==
2020 São Paulo mayoral election debates
| No. | Date and location | Hosts | Moderators | Participants (Note: Debates broadcast on television or radio were legally required to invite all candidates whose parties or coalitions had at least five members in the National Congress based on the most recent election. The candidates listed in this table satisfied this condition.) | | | | | | | | | | |
| Key: P Present A Absent Out Out of the election | | | | DEM | Republicanos | PT | PSL | PSC | PDT | PROS | PSOL | MDB | NOVO | REDE |
| Key: P Present A Absent Out Out of the election | | | | Paes | Crivella | Silva | Lima | Heloiza | Rocha | Garotinho | Souza | Messina | Luz | Mello |
|---|---|---|---|---|---|---|---|---|---|---|---|---|---|---|
| 1.1 | Thursday, 1 October 2020; Rio de Janeiro, Vila Isabel | Band | Carlos Andreazza | P | P | P | P | P | P | P | P | P | P | P |
| 2.1 | Tuesday, 17 November 2020; Rio de Janeiro, Ventura Corporate Towers | CNN Brazil | Monalisa Perrone | A | P | Out | | | | | | | | |
| 2.2 | Thursday, 19 November 2020; Rio de Janeiro, Vila Isabel | Band | Mariana Procópio | P | P | Out | | | | | | | | |
| 2.3 | Friday, 27 November 2020; São Paulo, Jacarepaguá | Globo | Ana Paula Araújo | P | P | Out | | | | | | | | |

== Municipal Chamber ==
The result of the last municipal election and the current situation in the Municipal Chamber is given below:

| Affiliation | Members | |
| Affiliation | Elected | Current |
|---|---|---|
| MDB | 10 | 1 |
| PSOL | 6 | 6 |
| DEM | 4 | 8 |
| Republicanos | 3 | 6 |
| PSDB | 3 | 0 |
| PSC | 3 | 3 |
| PTB | 3 | 1 |
| PT | 2 | 2 |
| PDT | 2 | 2 |
| PP | 2 | 6 |
| Solidarity | 2 | 2 |
| PHS | 2 | 0 |
| PSD | 2 | 3 |
| PMN | 2 | 1 |
| NOVO | 1 | 0 |
| PROS | 1 | 1 |
| Patriota | 1 | 1 |
| Avante | 1 | 1 |
| PODE | 1 | 2 |
| DC | 0 | 1 |
| Cidadania | 0 | 2 |
| PL | 0 | 1 |
| PTC | 0 | 1 |
| Total | 51 | |

== Results ==
=== Mayor ===
| Candidate | Running mate | Party | First round | | Second round | |
| Candidate | Running mate | Party | Votes | % | Votes | % |
|---|---|---|---|---|---|---|
| Eduardo Paes | Nilton Caldeira (PL) | DEM | 974,804 | 37.01 | 1,629,319 | 64.07 |
| Marcelo Crivella (incumbent) | Andréa Firmo (PRTB) | Republicanos | 576,825 | 21.90 | 913,700 | 35.93 |
| Martha Rocha | Anderson Quack (PSB) | PDT | 297,751 | 11.30 | | |
| Benedita da Silva | Rejane de Almeida (PCdoB) | PT | 296,847 | 11.27 | | |
| Luiz Lima | Fernando Veloso (PSD) | PSL | 180,336 | 6.85 | | |
| Renata Souza | Íbis Pereira | PSOL | 85,272 | 3.24 | | |
| Paulo Messina | Shiela Barbosa | MDB | 77,093 | 2.93 | | |
| Bandeira de Mello | Andréa Gouvêa | REDE | 65,296 | 2.48 | | |
| Fred Luz | Giselle Gomes | NOVO | 46,246 | 1.76 | | |
| Glória Heloiza | Mauro Santos | PSC | 13,816 | 0.52 | | |
| Clarissa Garotinho | Jorge Coutinho | PROS | 12,178 | 0.46 | | |
| Suêd Haidar | Jessica Natalino | PMB | 3,833 | 0.15 | | |
| Cyro Garcia | Elisa Guimarães | PSTU | 3,025 | 0.11 | | |
| Henrique Simonard | Caetano Sigiliano | PCO | 589 | 0.02 | | |
| Total | | | 2,633,911 | 100.00 | 2,543,019 | 100.00 |
| Valid votes | | | 2,633,911 | 80.77 | 2,543,019 | 81.20 |
| Invalid votes | | | 413,962 | 12.69 | 431,104 | 13.77 |
| Blank votes | | | 213,138 | 6.54 | 157,610 | 5.03 |
| Total votes | | | 3,261,011 | 100.00 | 3,131,733 | 100.00 |
| Registered voters/turnout | | | 4,851,887 | 67.21 | 4,851,887 | 64.55 |
Source: G1

Popular vote (first round)
| Paes | 37.01% |
| Crivella | 21.90% |
| Rocha | 11.30% |
| Silva | 11.27% |
| Lima | 6.85% |
| Souza | 3.24% |
| Others | 8.42% |

Popular vote (second round)
| Paes | 64.07% |
| Crivella | 35.93% |

=== Municipal Chamber ===
| Party | Votes | % | Seats | +/– |
|---|---|---|---|---|
| Republicanos | 294,298 | 11.15 | 7 | ▲3 |
| Socialism and Liberty Party | 289,102 | 10.96 | 7 | ▲1 |
| Democrats | 275,298 | 10.43 | 7 | ▲3 |
| Workers' Party | 142,047 | 5.38 | 3 | ▲1 |
| Social Democratic Party | 123,054 | 4.66 | 3 | ▲1 |
| Avante | 116,350 | 4.41 | 3 | ▲2 |
| Progressistas | 112,866 | 4.28 | 2 | Steady |
| Liberal Party | 110,152 | 4.17 | 2 | ▲2 |
| Cidadania | 100,458 | 3.81 | 2 | ▲2 |
| Social Christian Party | 99,891 | 3.79 | 2 | ▼1 |
| Brazilian Labour Party | 86,813 | 3.29 | 2 | ▼1 |
| Solidariedade | 77,423 | 2.93 | 1 | ▼1 |
| New Party | 74,445 | 2.82 | 1 | Steady |
| Party of National Mobilization | 73,825 | 2.80 | 1 | ▼1 |
| Patriota | 67,843 | 2.57 | 1 | Steady |
| Social Liberal Party | 66,895 | 2.53 | 1 | ▲1 |
| Christian Labour Party | 64,673 | 2.45 | 1 | ▲1 |
| Christian Democracy | 64,371 | 2.44 | 1 | ▲1 |
| Democratic Labour Party | 62,614 | 2.37 | 1 | ▼1 |
| Podemos | 60,012 | 2.27 | 1 | Steady |
| Brazilian Democratic Movement | 50,519 | 1.91 | 1 | ▼9 |
| Republican Party of the Social Order | 46,753 | 1.77 | 1 | Steady |
| Brazilian Labour Renewal Party | 37,422 | 1.42 | 0 | Steady |
| Brazilian Socialist Party | 35,806 | 1.36 | 0 | Steady |
| Brazilian Woman's Party | 27,506 | 1.04 | 0 | Steady |
| Communist Party of Brazil | 27,436 | 1.04 | 0 | Steady |
| Brazilian Social Democracy Party | 19,795 | 0.75 | 0 | ▼3 |
| Sustainability Network | 15,710 | 0.60 | 0 | Steady |
| Green Party | 6,533 | 0.25 | 0 | Steady |
| Popular Unity | 3,754 | 0.14 | 0 | New |
| Brazilian Communist Party | 3,467 | 0.13 | 0 | Steady |
| United Socialist Workers' Party | 1,683 | 0.06 | 0 | Steady |
| Workers' Cause Party | 153 | 0.01 | 0 | Steady |
| Total | 2,638,967 | 100.00 | 51 | – |
| Valid votes | 2,638,967 | 80.93 | | |
| Invalid votes | 381,614 | 11.70 | | |
| Blank votes | 240,094 | 7.36 | | |
| Total votes | 3,260,675 | 100.00 | | |
| Registered voters/turnout | 4,851,887 | 67.20 | | |
Source: G1
