= Bella Gonçalves =

Brazilian politician

Isabella Gonçalves Miranda
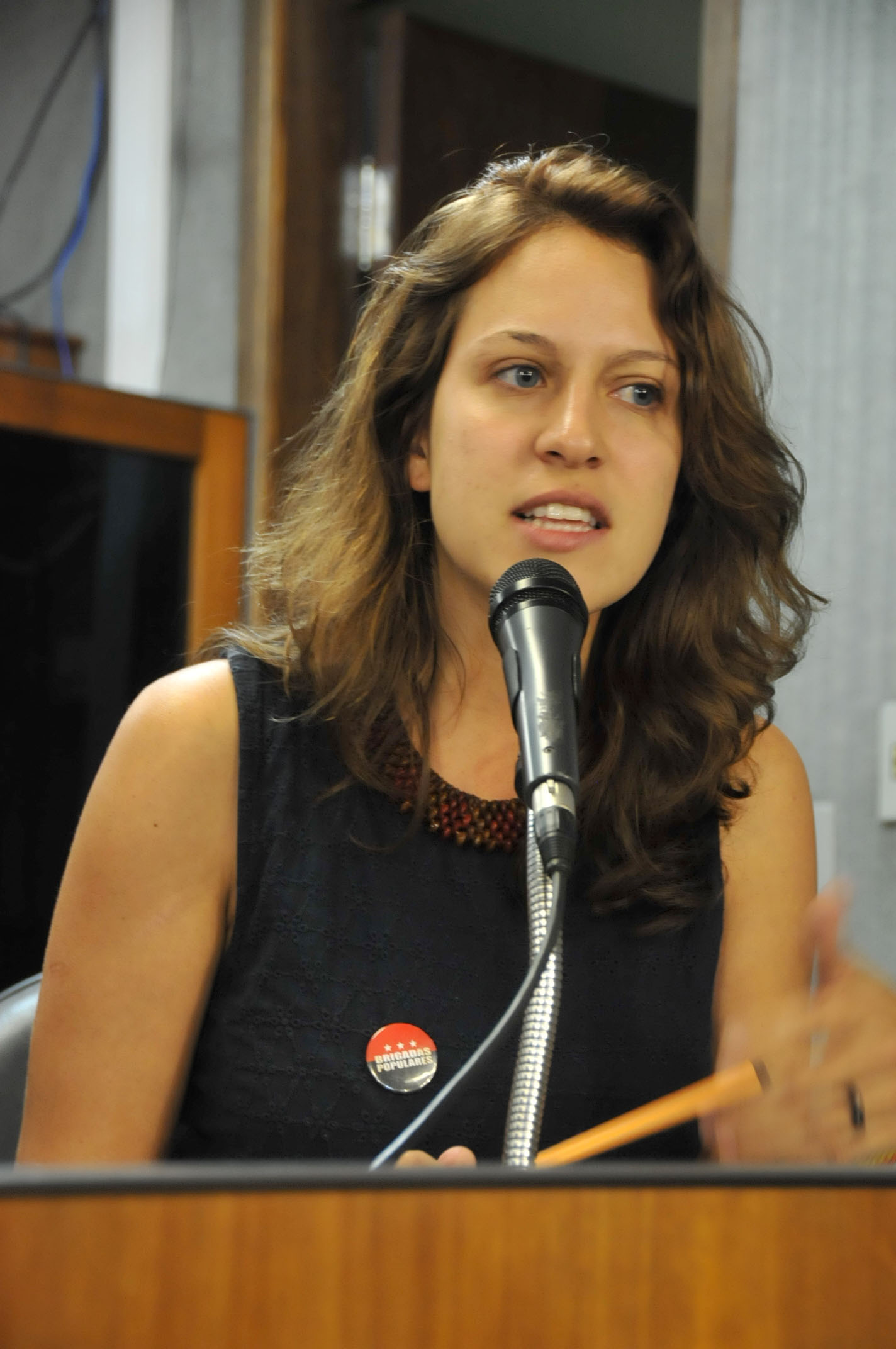
- Bella Gonçalves in 2016

State Deputy of Minas Gerais

Personal details
- Born: 20 November 1988 (age 37) Belo Horizonte, Minas Gerais, Brazil
- Education: Federal University of Minas Gerais

Isabella Gonçalves Miranda (born 20 November 1988), better known as Bella Gonçalves, is a Brazilian political scientist and politician. She served as a city councilor in Belo Horizonte representing the Socialism and Liberty Party (PSOL). Isabella also held the position of president of the city section of PSOL and was an active member of the Brigadas Populares, advocating for the right to the city. Notably, she became the first openly lesbian city councilor in Belo Horizonte. She was elected as a State Representative of Minas Gerais in 2022.

== Academic background ==
Bella holds a degree in Social Sciences from the Federal University of Minas Gerais (2012) and earned her doctorate in Postcolonialisms and Global Citizenship from the Center for Social Studies at the University of Coimbra (CES) in Portugal, as well as in Political Science from UFMG (2019). During her doctoral studies, Bella Gonçalves defended a thesis titled "Brasil em Movimento: o fim da Nova República e a crise da esquerda brasileira" (Brazil in Motion: The End of the New Republic and the Crisis of the Brazilian Left). During her university years, she was involved in the University Extension Project "Polos de Cidadania" at UFMG.

== Politics ==
In 2008, during her studies in Social Sciences and while participating in the "Polos de Cidadania" program, she initiated contact with local social movements. She actively engaged in the struggle for land regularization using the legal instrument of collective usucaption of the Vila Acaba Mundo favela. She also contributed to discussions and cooperatives in the Vale do Jequitinhonha region, focusing on women's rights.

=== Brigadas Populares ===
In 2009, she joined the Brigadas Populares, a "militant, popular, and mass organization" that operates with a socialist, class-oriented, feminist, antiracist, anti-imperialist, anti-punitivist, and nationalist-revolutionary approach. The organization is active in diverse locations such as occupations, peripheries, neighborhoods, community organizations, collectives, unions, schools, and universities. It currently has a presence in states including Bahia, Ceará, Distrito Federal, Espírito Santo, Minas Gerais, Rio de Janeiro, Santa Catarina, São Paulo, and Pará. She was one of the founders of the "Comitê Popular dos Atingidos pela Copa" (Popular Committee of Those Affected by the World Cup), which played a key role in organizing the resistance of families affected by the construction works related to the 2014 FIFA World Cup. She supported various housing struggles, including the Dandara Occupation and the Izidora occupations, among others, in the Metropolitan Region of Belo Horizonte. She also supported the resistance of workers at the Feira do Mineirinho (Mineirinho Market) and the Barraqueiros do Mineirão (vendors near the Mineirão Stadium), who were affected by the hosting of the World Cup in Brazil. She was also a member of the "Fora Lacerda" movement, which opposed the business-oriented administration of Mayor Márcio Lacerda between 2009 and 2016.

She participated in the popular protests of June 2013 in Brazil.

=== 2016 elections ===
Bella was part of the "Muitas (Pela Cidade que Queremos)" movement, which in 2016 launched various candidacies for municipal elections. This movement combined a diversity of perspectives to create a space for political engagement in Belo Horizonte. Under the motto "Votou em Uma, Votou em Todas" (Voted for One, Voted for All), she was the third most voted candidate in the PSOL/PCB coalition, making her the first alternate. She was subsequently invited to join the "Gabinetona" as a co-councilor, along with the elected councilors Áurea Carolina and Cida Falabella. In 2018, with the election of Áurea Carolina to the Chamber of Deputies, Bella Gonçalves assumed the position of councilor.

=== 2020 elections ===
In the municipal elections of 2020, she was reelected to the municipal council with 6,954 votes.

As a councilor, she was part of the CPI (Parliamentary Inquiry Commission) on BHTrans in 2021, which uncovered the formation of a cartel in the bidding process for public transportation in Belo Horizonte, established in 2008. She later served as the chairwoman of the Human Rights Committee in the Belo Horizonte Municipal Council.

=== 2022 elections ===
In the 2022 elections, she was elected as a State Deputy of Minas Gerais for PSOL, receiving 43,768 votes.

== Boaventura de Sousa Santos' sexual harassment case ==
In 2023, Bella Gonçalves announced she had been sexually assaulted by Boaventura de Sousa Santos while she was a PhD student at the Centre for Social Studies of the University of Coimbra (CES), in Coimbra, Portugal.
