= Fernando Genro =

Brazilian footballer (born 1988)

Personal information
- Full name: Fernando Marcel Genro Robaina
- Date of birth: 22 January 1988 (age 38)
- Place of birth: Porto Alegre, Brazil
- Position: Forward

Youth career
- 1998–2008: Grêmio

Senior career*
Years	Team	Apps	(Gls)
2009	Cerâmica		
2010	Guarani de Venâncio Aires		
2010	Puertollano		
2010	Ferroviário	11	(4)
2011	Canoas		

International career
- Brazil U15
- * Club domestic league appearances and goals

Fernando Marcel Genro Robaina (born 22 January 1988) is a Brazilian former footballer who played as a forward.

== Early life ==
Genro was born in Porto Alegre to lawyer and politician Luciana Genro, who ran for president of Brazil in 2014, and Roberto Robaína, who is also a member of the Socialism and Liberty Party. His parents divorced while he was still a young child. He is the grandson of Tarso Genro, a former leader of the Workers' Party in Brazil.

== Club career ==
Genro was introduced to football through his paternal grandmother, who enrolled him in his first futsal school. He joined the youth academy of Grêmio, spending ten years before quitting the club in 2008 to begin practicing politics.

He returned to football in 2009, signing with Cerâmica, who were then playing in the Campeonato Gaúcho Segunda Divisão, the second tier of football in Rio Grande do Sul. He had a brief spell with Guarani de Venâncio Aires in early 2010, before moving to Spain to join lower-league side Puertollano.

He ended 2010 with Ferroviário, where he scored four goals in eleven Campeonato Cearense appearances. Ahead of the 2011 season, he signed for Campeonato Gaúcho side Canoas.

== International career ==
Genro represented Brazil at under-15 level.

== Post-football career ==
Having struggled with the hardline attitude of his coach at Canoas, Genro decided to leave football after one season at the club. He had already signed up to become a member of the Socialism and Liberty Party while playing football, and he began to study law at the Pontifical Catholic University of Rio Grande do Sul. Having graduated in 2017, he worked at the Criminal Execution Court, as an advisor to a judge.

In 2017, following a request by Genro, Brazilian YouTuber Arthur do Val was told to remove a video he had uploaded on the Mamãefalei channel - linked to the Movimento Brasil Livre - in which he criticised Luciana Genro and her family, including accusing Fernando of embezzling R$30,000. In September 2022, do Val was ordered to pay Genro R$30,000 in compensation for fake news relating to the accusation in 2017.

Genro is a licensed lawyer.

== Football career statistics ==
Appearances and goals by club, season and competition
Club	Season	League			State League		Cup		Other		Total	
Club	Season	Division	Apps	Goals	Apps	Goals	Apps	Goals	Apps	Goals	Apps	Goals
Ferroviário	2010	–			11 (Note: Appearances in the Campeonato Cearense)	4	0	0	0	0	11	4
Career total			0	0	11	4	0	0	0	0	11	4
