= Sâmia Bomfim =

Brazilian politician (born 1989)

- Bomfim in 2024

Member of the Chamber of Deputies
- Incumbent
- Assumed office 1 February 2019
- Constituency: São Paulo

Member of the Municipal Chamber of São Paulo
- In office 1 January 2017 – 1 February 2019
- Constituency: At-large

Personal details
- Born: Sâmia de Souza Bomfim; 22 August 1989 (age 37) Presidente Prudente, São Paulo, Brazil
- Party: PSOL (2011–present)
- Domestic partner: Glauber Braga (2020–present)
- Education: Faculty of Philosophy, Languages and Human Sciences, University of São Paulo
- Profession: Public servant
- Website: samiabomfim.com.br

Sâmia de Souza Bomfim (born 22 August 1989) is a Brazilian politician. She has spent her political career representing São Paulo, having served as federal deputy since 2019.

== Personal life ==
Prior to entering politics Bomfim worked as a civil servant. She identifies as a feminist. She cites her inspirations as fellow PSOL politicians and activists Marielle Franco and Jean Wyllys. She is also inspired by her close friend Vinicius Luz. Bomfim is considered a supporter of LGBT rights and took part in the 2019 São Paulo Pride parade.

In 2016 Bomfim participated protests demanding the resignation of Eduardo Cunha and protesting rape culture in Brazil.

In January 2020, Bomfim publicly announced that she was in a relationship with Glauber Braga, federal deputy for the PSOL of Rio de Janeiro. In December 2020, Bomfim announced she was pregnant with the couple's first child, Hugo. In June 2021, the couple's first child was born.

== Political career ==
Bomfim is the youngest woman ever elected to the Municipal Chamber of São Paulo, at the age of 27, and the first woman to be directly elected to the federal Chamber of Deputies for the Socialism and Liberty Party. In the 2018 general election, Bomfin was one of the most voted candidates with 249,887 votes, being elected to the federal Chamber of Deputies.

== Murder of her brother ==
In the early hours of 5 October 2023, the physician Diego Ralf Bomfim, Sâmia's brother, was shot at a kiosk located in the neighborhood of Barra da Tijuca, in Rio de Janeiro. He and two other physicians were killed and a third was injured and hospitalized. One of the hypothesis of the Rio de Janeiro Civil Police investigation is that the three doctors were killed by mistake and that the physician Perseu Ribeiro Almeida, one of the victims, was mistaken for a local crime boss from the region of Jacarepaguá.

However, the Minister of Justice and Public Security of Brazil, Flávio Dino, wrote on his social media that the crime may also be motivated by the political activism of Sâmia and her husband, Glauber Braga, who is a federal deputy representing the state of Rio de Janeiro in the National Congress. He ordered the Federal Police of Brazil to follow the probe.

Chamber of Deputies (Brazil)
Preceded by Fernanda Melchionna	Chamber PSOL Leader; 2020–21	Succeeded by Talíria Petrone
