= Socialist Workers' Current =

Socialist Workers' Current Corrente Socialista dos Trabalhadores
- Founded: 1992
- Split from: Socialist Convergency
- Newspaper: Combate Socialista (Socialist Combat)
- Ideology: Marxism; Socialism; Trotskyism
- Political position: Far-left
- National affiliation: PSOL
- International affiliation: IWU-FI
- Colours: Red

Website
- www.cstpsol.com

Socialist Workers' Current (Portuguese: Corrente Socialista dos Trabalhadores, CST) is a far-left Trotskyist political organisation in Brazil, created in 1992 by a split of the Socialist Convergence. CST is an active tendency of the Socialism and Liberty Party (PSOL) and the Brazilian section of the International Workers' Unity – Fourth International. CST split from Worker's Party (PT) when its federal deputy Babá was expelled from PT, after voting against the pension reform proposed by ex-president Lula. Among the largest currents in PSOL, CST is the most leftist tendency.
