= Luciana Genro =

Brazilian politician

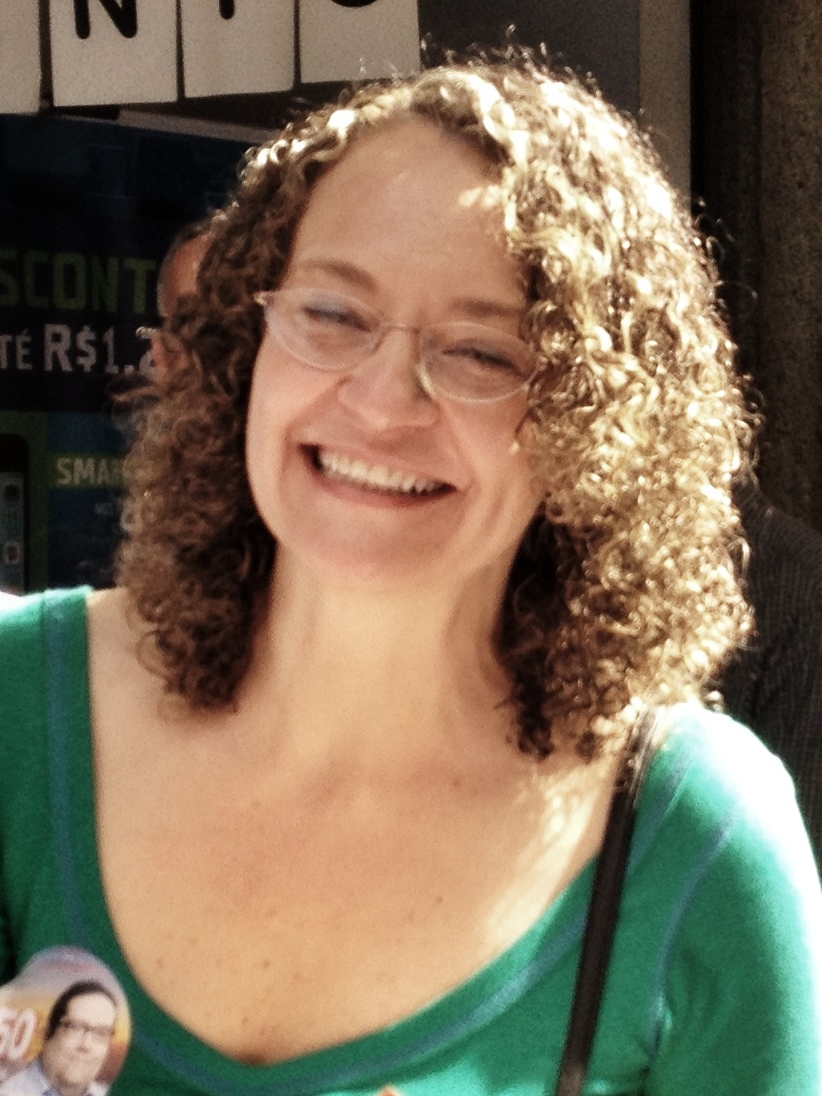

Member of the Legislative Assembly of Rio Grande do Sul
- Incumbent
- Assumed office 1 January 2019
- Constituency: At-large
- In office 1 February 1995 – 1 February 2003
- Constituency: At-large

Member of the Chamber of Deputies
- In office 1 February 2003 – 1 February 2011
- Constituency: Rio Grande do Sul

Personal details
- Born: Luciana Krebs Genro; 17 January 1971 (age 55) Santa Maria, Rio Grande do Sul, Brazil
- Party: PSOL (2005–present)
- Other political affiliations: PT (1985–2005)
- Spouse(s): Roberto Robaína (m. 1987; div. 1991) Sérgio Bueno (m. 1997)
- Children: Fernando Genro Robaína (b. 1988)
- Parents: Tarso Genro (father); Sandra Krebs (mother)
- Education: University of the Rio dos Sinos Valley (Unisinos)
- Occupation: Attorney, politician, professor

Luciana Krebs Genro (Santa Maria, Rio Grande do Sul, January 17, 1971) is a Brazilian politician, state deputy and one of the founders of the Socialism and Freedom Party (PSOL). In 2014, she was the PSOL nominee for President of Brazil. She came in 4th place, receiving more than 1.6 million votes nationally. She is the daughter of Tarso Genro, a Workers' Party (PT) politician and former governor of Rio Grande do Sul.

== Biography ==
=== Early life and career ===
Luciana began her political career in the student movement in Porto Alegre and was part of the Socialist Convergence, at the time of the current Workers' Party (PT). She was elected in 1994, at the age of 23, for her first term as state deputy, and re-elected in 1998 with twice the previous vote. In the Legislative Assembly, she stood out for denouncing corruption at Corsan, when directed by Berfran Rosado, and for defending various processes of struggles of teachers, students, workers and other social movements.

=== Electoral history and founding of PSOL ===
In 2002, she was elected for the first time as a federal deputy by her state, in the same elections in which Luiz Inácio Lula da Silva rose to the Presidency of the Republic. Right at the beginning of the government, she disagreed with PT policies after coming to power, particularly with the government's pension reform proposal in 2003. She voted against and was expelled from the party by José Dirceu and José Genoíno, who are now detained after the Mensalão scandal.

She started, with Heloísa Helena and other dissident deputies, the founding process of PSOL, consolidated in 2005. The following year, she was re-elected federal deputy, already by the new party. In her two terms in the Chamber of Deputies, she devoted herself especially to bills in the economic field, such as the regulation of the tax on large fortunes. In 2008, she ran for mayor of Porto Alegre and took fourth place, with 9% of the votes.

=== 2014 presidential campaign and aftermath ===
Luciana was a candidate for the Presidency of Brazil in the 2014 elections. In her campaign, she defended a program of deep reform of the economic and political systems, agrarian reform, civil rights and freedoms, among others. She ended the contest in 4th place, with more than 1.6 million votes. Luciana Genro was a candidate for mayor of Porto Alegre in 2016. She confirmed her interest in the dispute after her name appeared first in a poll that measures voting intentions. However, she finished the race in 5th place.

In 2018, she was pushed by some in PSOL to run for President again; however, she chose not to run, with Guilherme Boulos serving as the party's nominee. Instead, she was elected state deputy of Rio Grande do Sul on the Brazilian General Election.

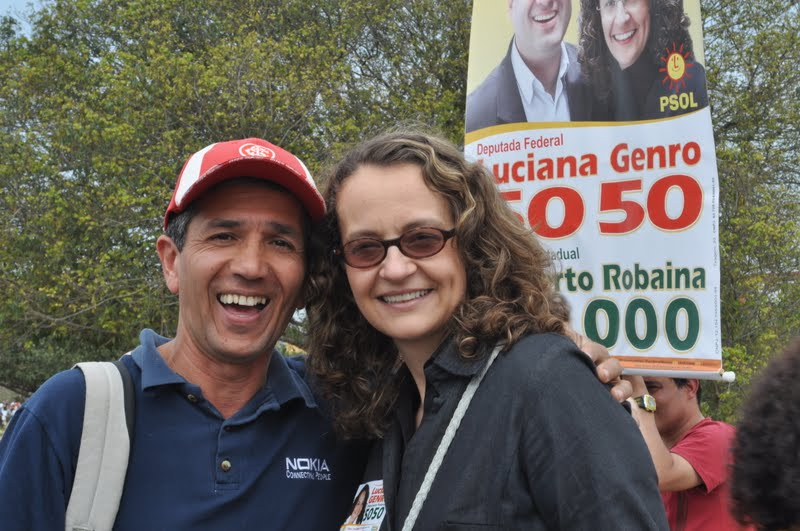
Genro and Roberto Robaina in 2010.

In March 2022 she was amongst the 151 international feminists who signed Feminist Resistance Against War: A Manifesto, in solidarity with the Russian Feminist Anti-War Resistance. (Note: This manifesto was criticized by both Ukrainian feminists and members of the Feminist Anti-War Resistance themselves.)

== Personal life ==
Genro is the daughter of Tarso Genro and Sandra Krebs. Despite having significantly different political views, Luciana maintains a good relationship with her family. She is also the granddaughter of Adelmo Simas Genro, a member of the historical Brazilian Labor Party who was murdered by the military dictatorship, and niece of Adelmo Genro Filho, a journalist now deceased.

Luciana Genro has one son, Fernando Marcel Genro Robaina, born in 1988. Fernando's father is Roberto Robaina, a party director of PSOL with whom Luciana lived together for three and a half years. She separated from Robaina in 1991 and married journalist Sérgio Bueno in 1997. She identifies as an atheist.

== Notes ==
Party political offices
Preceded by Plínio de Arruda Sampaio	PSOL nominee for President of Brazil; 2014	Succeeded by Guilherme Boulos
Chamber of Deputies (Brazil)
New political party	Chamber PSOL Leader; 2005−2006; 2008−2009	Succeeded by Babá
Preceded by Chico Alencar	Chamber PSOL Leader; 2005−2006; 2008−2009	Succeeded by Ivan Valente
