= Genro =

Genro may refer to:

- Genro (surname)
- Genrō (元老), Japanese title
