= Luciene Cavalcante =

Brazilian politician (born 1979)

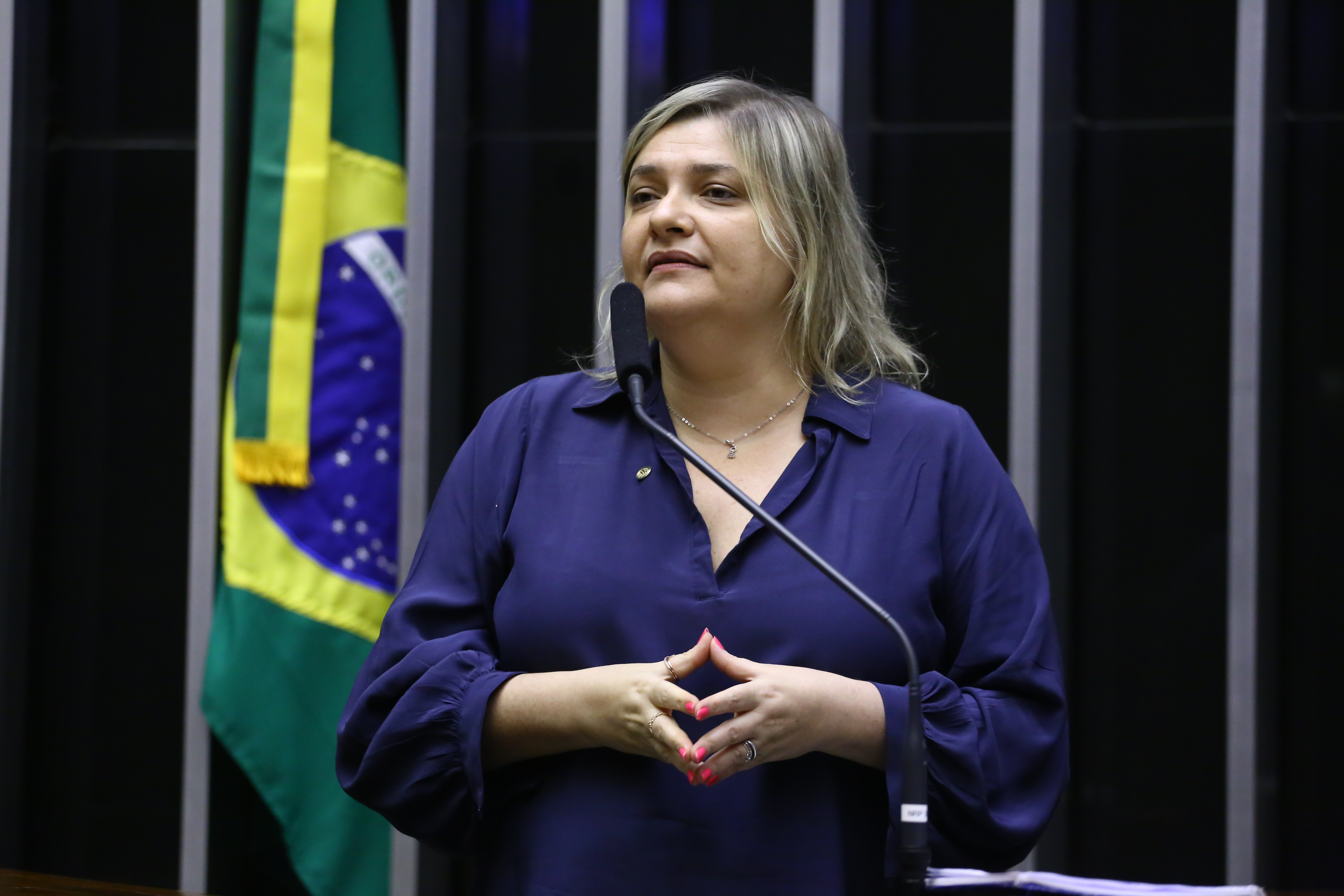
- Cavalcante in 2023

Member of the Chamber of Deputies
- Incumbent
- Assumed office 3 February 2023
- Constituency: São Paulo

Personal details
- Born: Luciene Cavalcante da Silva; 21 December 1979 (age 46) São Paulo, Brazil
- Party: PSOL (since 2007)
- Profession: Pedagogue, lawyer

Luciene Cavalcante da Silva (born 21 December 1979) is a Brazilian politician serving as a member of the Chamber of Deputies since 2023. She previously worked as a teacher and principal.
