= Ivan Valente =

Brazilian politician, teacher and engineer (born 1946)

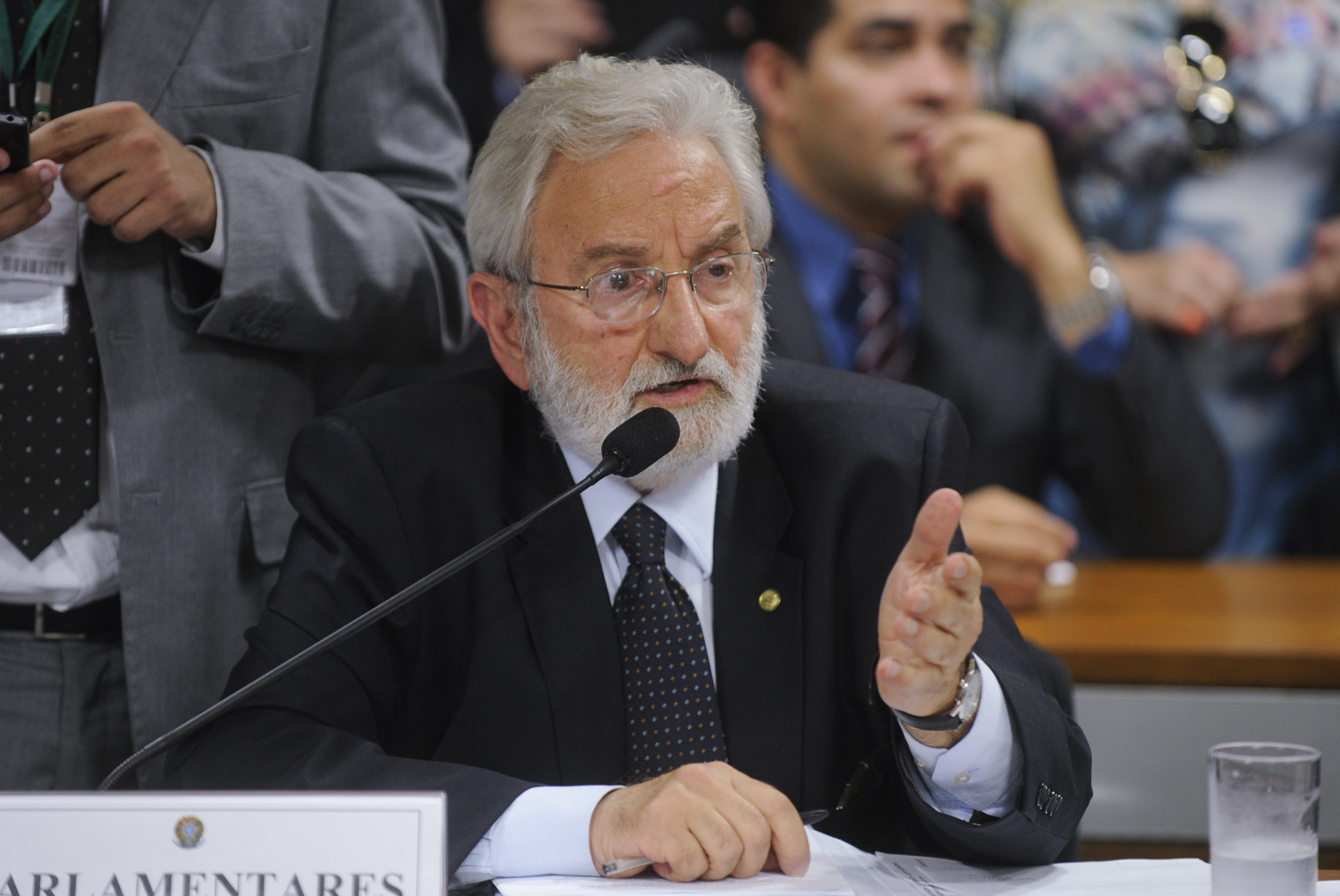

Member of the Chamber of Deputies
- Incumbent
- Assumed office 1 February 1995
- Constituency: São Paulo

Leader of PSOL in the Chamber of Deputies
- In office 1 February 2019 – 4 February 2020
- Preceded by: Chico Alencar
- Succeeded by: Fernanda Melchionna

State Deputy of São Paulo
- In office 15 March 1987 – 1 February 1995
- Constituency: At-large

National President of PSOL
- In office 4 December 2011 – 1 December 2013
- Preceded by: Afrânio Boppré
- Succeeded by: Luiz Araújo

Personal details
- Born: Ivan Valente; 5 July 1946 (age 80) São Paulo, São Paulo, Brazil
- Party: PSOL (2005–present)
- Other political affiliations: PT (1980–2005)
- Occupation: Engineer, teacher, politician
- Website: www.ivanvalente.com.br

Ivan Valente (born 5 July 1946) is a Brazilian politician, teacher and engineer. He has been a member of the Socialism and Liberty Party (PSOL) since 2005 and is a federal deputy for the state of São Paulo. He is the party leader at the Chamber of Deputies, and was PSOL's president from 2011 to 2013.

Chamber of Deputies (Brazil)
Preceded by Chico Alencar	Chamber PSOL Leader; 2019–2020	Succeeded by Fernanda Melchionna
Party political offices
Preceded by Afrânio Boppré	National President of PSOL; 2011–2013	Succeeded by Luiz Araújo
New political party	PSOL nominee for Mayor of São Paulo; 2008	Succeeded by Carlos Giannazi
Preceded by Carlos Giannazi	PSOL nominee for Vice Mayor of São Paulo; 2016	Succeeded by Luiza Erundina
