= Genro (surname) =

Genro is a surname. It mainly occurs in Brazil.

Notable people with this surname include:

- Luciana Genro (born 1971), Brazilian politician
- Tarso Genro (born 1947), Brazilian politician
