= Dani Monteiro =

Brazilian politician (born 1991)

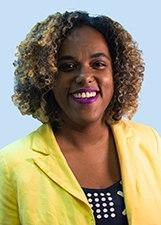
- Monteiro in 2022

Member of the Legislative Assembly of Rio de Janeiro
- Incumbent
- Assumed office 1 February 2019

Personal details
- Born: 12 August 1991 (age 35)
- Party: Socialism and Liberty Party (since 2015)

Daniella Monteiro da Silva (born 12 August 1991) is a Brazilian politician serving as a member of the Legislative Assembly of Rio de Janeiro since 2019. She has served as chairwoman of the human rights committee since 2021.
