= Chico Alencar =

Brazilian politician and historian

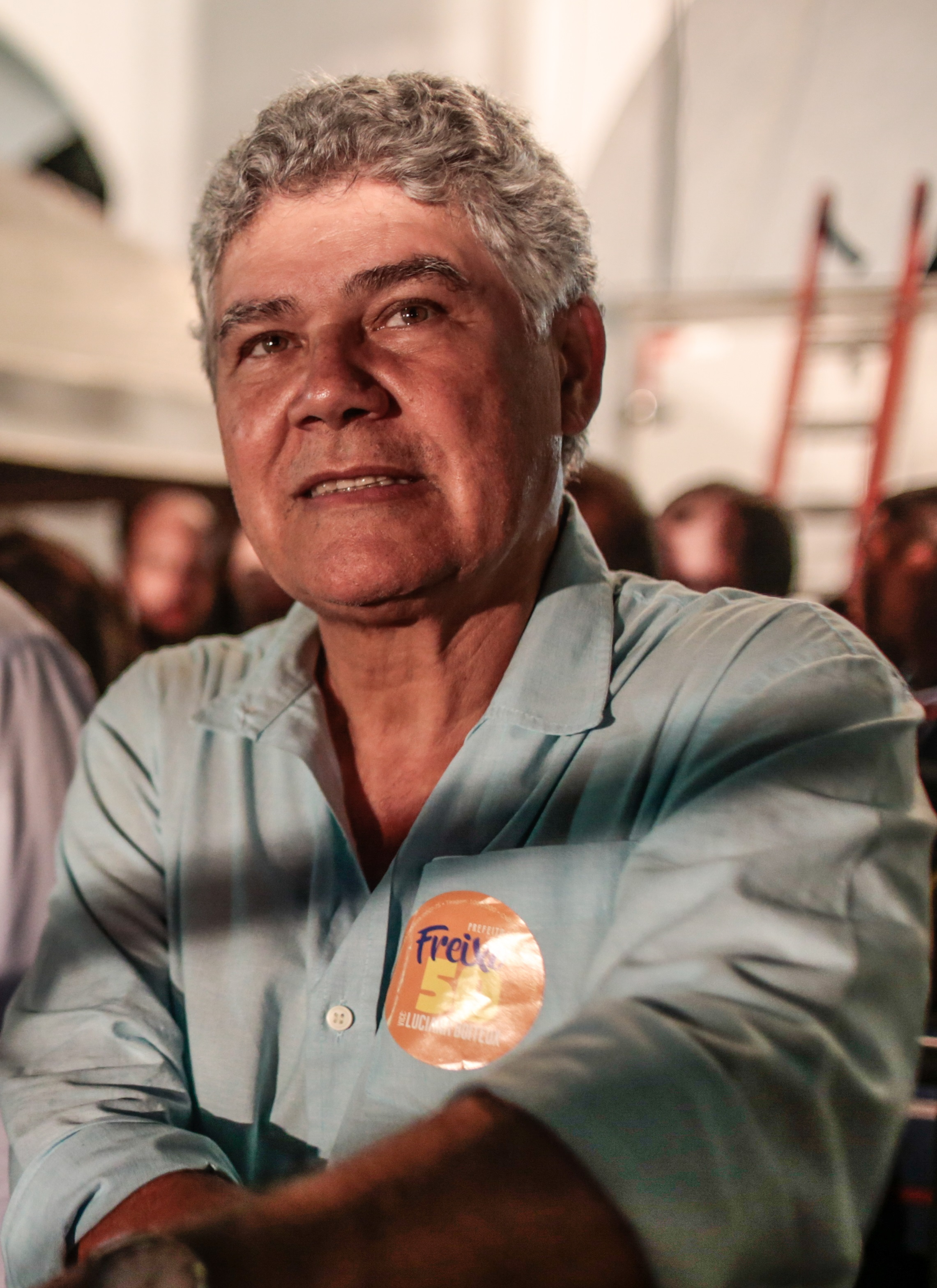

Member of the Chamber of Deputies
- Incumbent
- Assumed office 1 February 2023
- Constituency: Rio de Janeiro
- In office 1 February 2003 – 1 February 2019
- Constituency: Rio de Janeiro

Councillor of Rio de Janeiro
- In office 1 January 2021 – 1 February 2023
- Constituency: At-large
- In office 1 January 1989 – 1 January 1997
- Constituency: At-large

State Deputy of Rio de Janeiro
- In office 1 January 1999 – 1 January 2003
- Constituency: At-large

Personal details
- Born: Francisco Rodrigues de Alencar Filho; 19 October 1949 (age 76) Rio de Janeiro, Federal District, Brazil
- Party: PSOL (2005–present)
- Other political affiliations: MDB (1974–76); PT (1987–2005)
- Parents: Francisco Rodrigues de Alencar (father); Jacintha Garcia Duarte (mother)
- Education: Fluminense Federal University; Getulio Vargas Foundation
- Website: chicoalencar.com.br

Francisco Rodrigues de Alencar Filho, known as Chico Alencar (born 19 October 1949), is a Brazilian politician, historian, and writer, affiliated with the Socialism and Liberty Party (PSOL).

Alencar was first elected as a Councillor, representing the city of Rio de Janeiro for two consecutive terms (1989-92 and 1993-97). He was also elected as a state deputy, representing the state of Rio de Janeiro at the Legislative Assembly of Rio de Janeiro for a single term (1999-2003) and as a federal deputy representing the state of Rio de Janeiro at the Chamber of Deputies of Brazil for four consecutive terms (2003-07; 2007-11; 2011-15 and 2015-19).

He left the Workers' Party (PT) in 2005, along with one of his partners Plínio de Arruda Sampaio, after the expulsion of Luciana Genro, Heloísa Helena and Babá from the party. He was elected by journalists, five times in a row, the best federal deputy of Brazil, receiving the Prêmio Congresso em Foco (Congress in Focus Prize) award. On 17 April 2016, he voted against the opening of the impeachment process of former president Dilma Rousseff.

He was again elected as a Councillor of Rio de Janeiro on 2020 Rio de municipal election with 49,422 votes, staying in office at the Municipal Chamber of Rio de Janeiro for two years (2021-23) until he was reelected for a fifth term as a federal deputy on 2022 Rio de Janeiro state elections, with 115,023 votes.

== Electoral history ==
=== Chamber of Deputies ===
Election
Election	Party	Votes	%	Position in Rio de Janeiro State	Result
2002	PT	169,131	2.10	No. 6	Elected
2006	PSOL	119,069	1.49	No. 8	Elected
2010	PSOL	240,724	3.01	No. 2	Elected
2014	PSOL	195,964	2.57	No. 4	Elected
2022	PSOL	115,023	1.33	No. 12	Elected

=== Municipal Chamber of Rio de Janeiro ===
Election
Election	Party	Votes	%	Position in Rio de Janeiro Municipality	Result
1988	PT	15,964	0.63	No. 8	Elected
1992	PT	19,487	0.71	No. 6	Elected
2020	PSOL	49,422	1.88	No. 5	Elected

=== 2018 Rio de Janeiro senatorial election ===
Election
Election	Party	Votes	%	Position	Result
2018	PSOL	1,281,373	9.17	No. 5	Not Elected

=== Legislative Assembly of Rio de Janeiro ===
Election
Election	Party	Votes	%	Position in Rio de Janeiro State	Result
1998	PT	70,096	0.99	No. 3	Elected

=== Rio de Janeiro mayoral elections ===
Election
Election	Party	Votes	%	Position	Result
1996	PT	641,526	21.67	No. 3	Not Elected
2008	PSOL	59,362	1.88	No. 7	Not Elected
