= Guilherme Cortez =

Brazilian politician

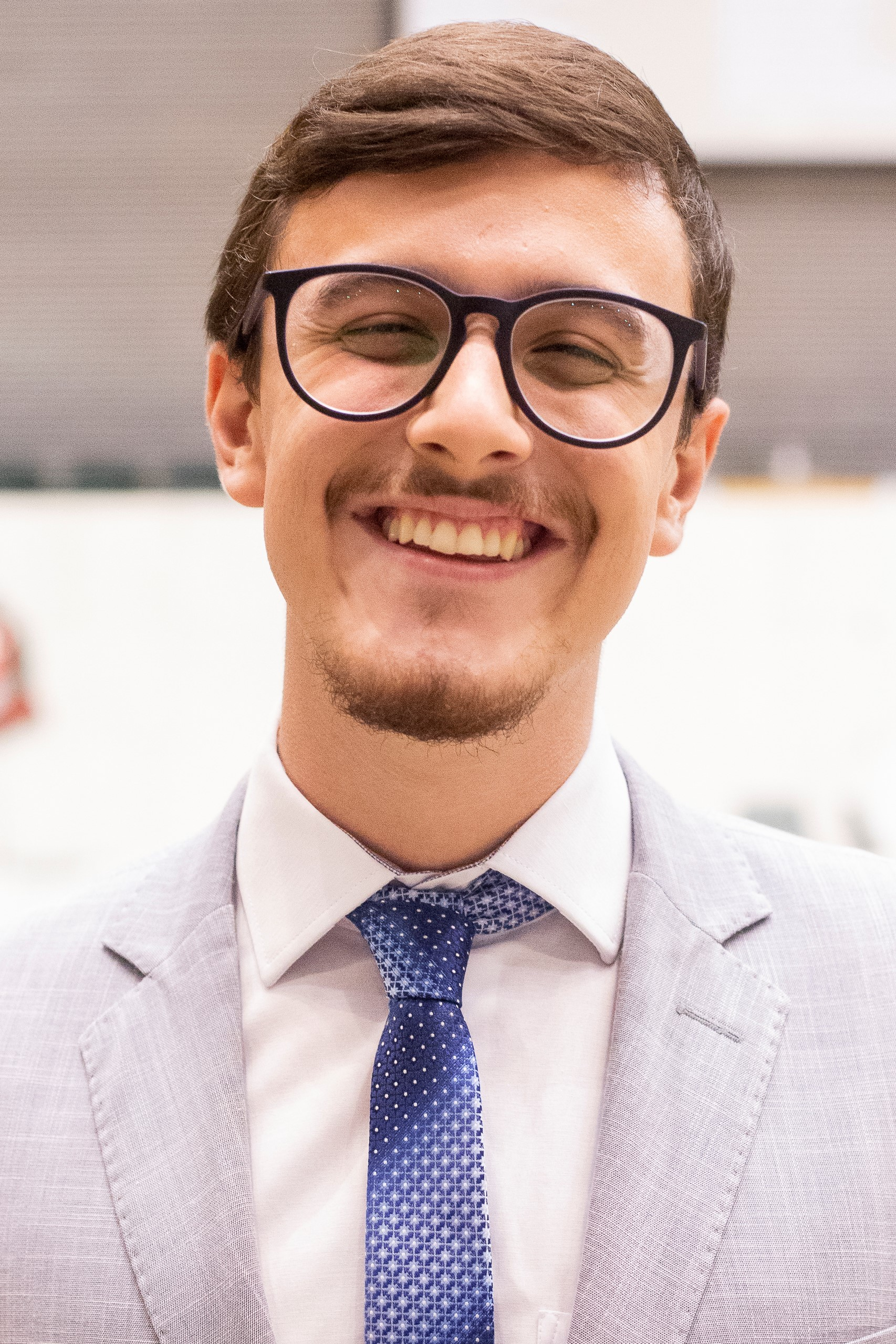
- Cortez in 2023

Member-elect of the Chamber of Deputies
- Assuming office 1 February 2027
- Constituency: São Paulo

Member of the Legislative Assembly of São Paulo
- Incumbent
- Assumed office 15 March 2023
- Constituency: At-large

Personal details
- Born: Guilherme da Costa Aguiar Cortez; 16 December 1997 (age 28) São Paulo, Brazil
- Party: PSOL (2015–present)
- Education: São Paulo State University
- Profession: Lawyer
- Website: guilhermecortez.com.br

Guilherme da Costa Aguiar Cortez (born 16 December 1997) is a Brazilian activist, lawyer and politician. Affiliated to the Socialism and Liberty Party (PSOL), he was elected state deputy of São Paulo in 2022, with 45,094 votes.

== Biography ==
=== First years and education ===
Cortez was born in São Paulo, the state capital, in 1997. During high school, he became involved in the secondary student movement and took part in the school occupations against the reorganization of the state education system in 2015, which was backed by the then governor of the state, Geraldo Alckmin (PSDB).

He moved to Franca, in the interior of the state, to study law at the city's São Paulo State University (Unesp). At university, he helped to set up the Central Student Directory (DCE) and became involved in the student movement. During his university years, he took part in the general strike against the labor reform in 2017, the demonstrations against the cuts in investment in education in 2019 and the actions for the impeachment of Jair Bolsonaro in 2021.

=== Politics ===
He began his political activism at the age of 16, joining the Socialism and Liberty Party (PSOL), and joining Afronte, the party's youth wing. Was a candidate for councillor for the municipality of Franca in the 2020 municipal election. Despite the significant number of votes, reaching the 4th highest vote in the election, Cortez was not elected, as his party did not reach the electoral quota needed to secure a seat on the city council. During the party convention held on 30 July 2022, he was chosen by PSOL to run in the 2022 legislative elections for the position of state deputy of São Paulo.

He was elected on 2 October 2022 to one of the six seats won by the PSOL REDE Federation, with 45,094 votes.

At the very beginning of his first term as a State Representative, Guilherme was elected deputy vice leader of the opposition in the Legislative Assembly of São Paulo (Alesp) with Ênio Tatto (PT) as a leader, a bloc made up of parliamentarians from the Workers' Party (PT), the Communist Party of Brazil (PCdoB), the Brazilian Socialist Party (PSB), the Sustainability Network (REDE) and PSOL against the Tarcísio de Freitas government.

In 2024, he was a candidate for mayor of Franca. The PSOL candidate used images of President Luiz Inácio Lula da Silva in his campaign product. The municipal directory of the PT in Franca, which had its own candidate with Mariana Negri, went to court and won so that Cortez would not use the image of the PT leader in his campaign. Cortez finished in third place and did not advance to the second round - he was the left's most voted candidate in the election. In 2026, he ran for the office of federal deputy representing São Paulo. After receiving more than 275,000 votes, he was the ninth-highest vote-getter in the election in São Paulo.

=== Clash with Ricardo Salles ===
On 20 August 2022, Guilherme rose to national prominence when he clashed with former Environment Minister Ricardo Salles (PL) during a campaign event in the municipality of Franca. The action was filmed and made the headlines of several press outlets, with repercussions in national media.

==== Electoral performance ====
| Year | Election | Position | Party | Coalition | Running Mate | Votes | % | Result | Ref. |
|---|---|---|---|---|---|---|---|---|---|
| 2020 | Municipal in Franca | City Councilor | PSOL | No coalition | | 2,890 | 2.01% | Not elected | |
| 2022 | São Paulo State Elections | State Deputy | PSOL | PSOL REDE Federation | Toninho Vespoli; Mariana Conti | 45,094 | 0.19% | Elected | |
| 2024 | Municipal in Franca | Mayor | PSOL | Franca do Futuro (Coalition: PSOL REDE Federation, PDT) | Bel Nascimento | 22,818 | 14.65% | Not elected | |
| 2026 | São Paulo State Elections | Federal Deputy | PSOL | PSOL REDE Federation | | 275,450 | 1.16% | Elected | |

== Personal life ==
Cortez is bisexual.
