= Fernanda Melchionna =

Brazilian politician

- Melchionna in 2026

Member of the Chamber of Deputies
- Incumbent
- Assumed office 1 February 2019
- Constituency: Rio Grande do Sul

Member of the Municipal Chamber of Porto Alegre
- In office 1 January 2009 – 1 February 2019
- Constituency: At-large

Personal details
- Born: Fernanda Melchionna e Silva; 2 February 1984 (age 42) Alegrete, Rio Grande do Sul, Brazil
- Party: PSOL (2008–present)
- Other political affiliations: PT (2004–2008)
- Profession: Bank clerk, librarian
- Website: fernandapsol.com.br

Fernanda Melchionna e Silva (born 2 February 1984) is a Brazilian politician and former bank clerk and librarian. She has spent her political career representing the state of Rio Grande do Sul, having served as federal deputy representative since 2019.

== Personal life ==
Melchionna became involved in politics at the age of 13, when along with her parents, she protested the neo-liberal policies and privatization of business of then president of Brazil Fernando Henrique Cardoso.

Prior to becoming a politician Melchionna worked as a bank clerk. She also has a degree in librarianship from the Federal University of Rio Grande do Sul.

== Political career ==
Melchionna was the most voted candidate in the 2016 election for the council of Porto Alegre, receiving 14,630 votes. Melchionna and her family were originally members of the Workers' Party, but she left after being dissatisfied with the politics of Lula da Silva.

In the 2018 election Melchionna was the tenth most voted candidate in the state of Rio Grande do Sul, being elected to the federal chamber of deputies.

Chamber of Deputies (Brazil)
Preceded by Ivan Valente	Chamber PSOL Leader; 2020	Succeeded by Sâmia Bomfim
