= Brigadas Populares =

Popular Brigades Brigadas Populares
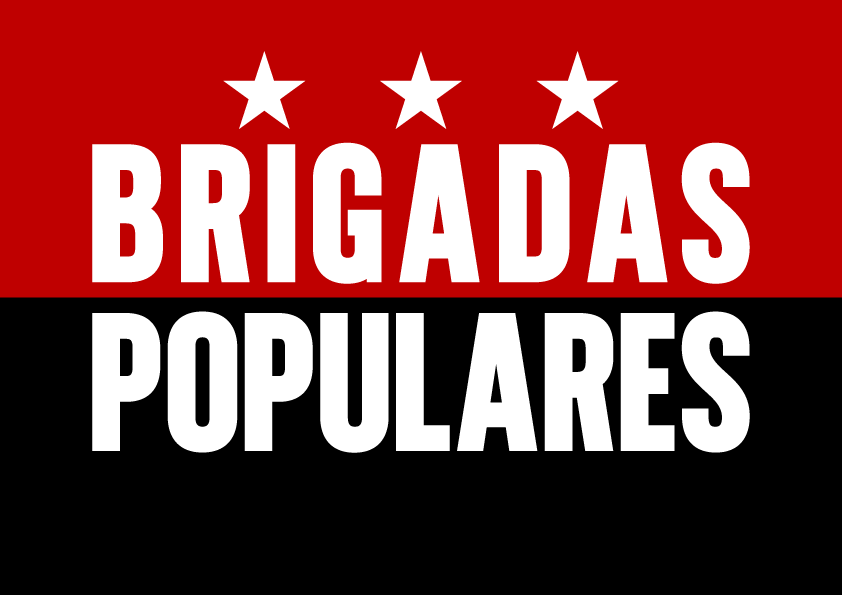
- Abbreviation: BPs
- Founded: 2011
- Ideology: Socialism; Marxism; Left-wing nationalism Anti-imperialism; Left-wing populism
- Political position: Left-wing
- Colors: Red; Black

Website
- Official website

The Popular Brigades (Portuguese: Brigadas Populares, BPs) is a socialist Brazilian political organization founded in September 18, 2011, in São Paulo. It emerged from the merger of four previous organizations and pursues strategic goals such as ending Brazil's dependency as well as the establishment of a sovereign and popular political regime. This philosophy is systematized in the organization's motto: Open Political Unity for a New Majority (Portuguese: Unidade aberta por uma nova maioria), which means the formation of a broad political field capable of consolidating itself as an alternative for the emancipation of the Brazilian people against a political regime built by the "Casa Grande" ("Big House", a reference to the slave owners and the dominat majority) and the "Casa Branca" (the White House, a reference to foreign imperialist influence in the country).

== Identity ==
The identity of the organization is defined by its political activities, which are oriented towards the "militant, popular and of the masses." The Popular Brigades seek a militancy of a territorial characteristic, organizing different social groups especially those that cannot sustain the needs of daily life. There is also a focus on advancing the interests of those living in the peripheries.

Currently, it composes part of the Fearless People's Front (Portuguese: Frente Povo Sem Medo), along with movements and organizations such as the Movement of Homeless Workers (MTST), the Landless Workers' Movement, the Fight Movement in Neighborhoods, Villages and Favelas (MLB), the Marxist Left, the Communist Pole Luiz Carlos Prestes and entities related to the Socialism and Freedom Party (PSOL), in addition to numerous other entities. Also, since 2016, according to the decision of the IV National Assembly of the Popular Brigades, they are part of "INTERSINDICAL - Central of the Working Class", a national trade union center.

== Activities ==
The Popular Brigades is known for its aggressive campaigns for urban reform (especially occupations), gender equality, student and union movements, the fight against racism, police violence, the antiprisonal and antipunitivist agenda (acting in the prison system), environmental fight against mining abuses, and several other issues. It has successfully advanced key movements such as the ocupações, this involved organized squats as a strategy for the poor to gain access to housing, which the organization stressed is a social right guaranteed by the Brazilian constitution. In June 2011, for instance, Brigadas Populares - together with other social movements - occupied a Social Services government building, which was leased to the Fasano hotel for the World Cup. The group demanded that the city needs more housing projects instead of hotels. They emerged victorious after a State Court ruled that the lease was null and void.

In 2018, a Popular Brigades militant, Andréia de Jesus, was elected as a State Deputy in Minas Gerais, with over 17 thousand votes, becoming the first ever black woman to be elect to the State House of Minas Gerais. She is in the Socialism and Liberty Party (PSOL).
