= Hélio Fernando Barbosa Lopes =

Brazilian politician and military officer (born 1969)

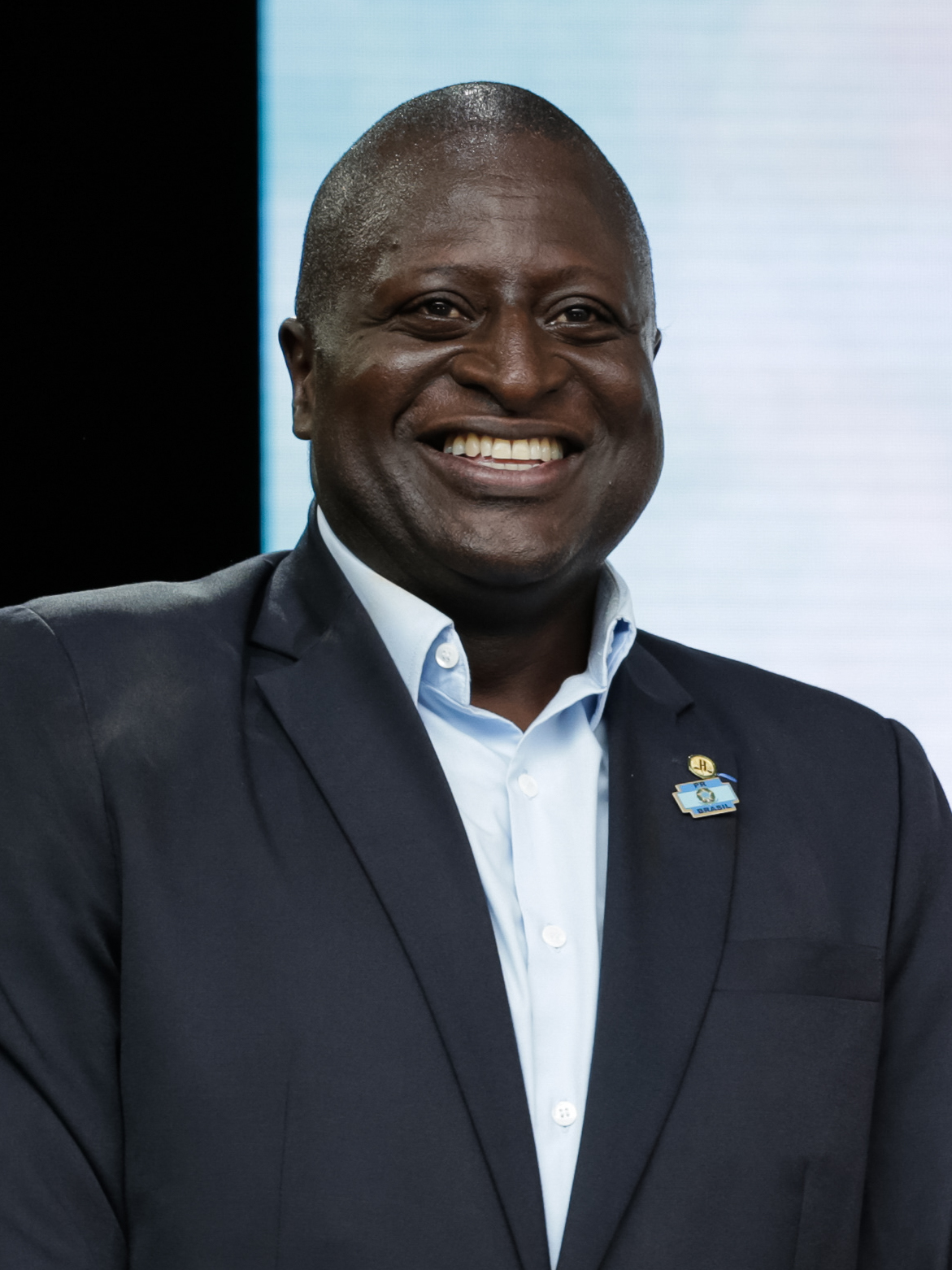

Member of the Chamber of Deputies for Rio de Janeiro
- Incumbent
- Assumed office February 1, 2019

Member of the Municipal Chamber of Nova Iguaçu
- In office January 1, 2017 – February 1, 2019

Personal details
- Born: March 28, 1969 (age 57) Rio de Janeiro, Brazil
- Party: PRP (2004–2014); PTN (2014–2016); PSC (2016–2018); PSL (2018–2022); Brazil Union (2022); Liberal Party (2022-present)
- Education: University of Southern Santa Catarina Brazilian Army Specialized Instruction School
- Occupation: Military and Politician

Military service
- Allegiance: Brazil
- Branch/service: Brazilian Army
- Years of service: 1992–2019
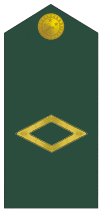
- Rank: Sub-lieutenant
- Unit: Eastern Military Command; 1st Battalion of Military Police; Criminal Investigation Squad

Hélio Fernando Barbosa Lopes (Rio de Janeiro, March 28, 1969), also known as Hélio Negão (literally: big black Hélio) and Hélio Bolsonaro, is a Brazilian politician and former military officer.

A member of PSL (Social Liberal Party), he ran in the 2018 election and was elected Federal Deputy. He received the most votes in the state of Rio de Janeiro, and is the most-voted Afro-Brazilian in Rio de Janeiro and Brazilian history. Lopes is known for being a close friend of Jair Bolsonaro.

== Political life ==
Lopes ran in 2004 as a PRP member to the position of alderman in the municipality of Queimados in the state of Rio de Janeiro, but was not elected, having obtained only 277 votes. In 2014 he ran as a PTN member to the position of Federal Deputy for the state of Rio de Janeiro, but had his candidacy rejected. In 2016 he ran as PSC's candidate to the position of alderman in the municipality of Nova Iguaçu in the state of Rio de Janeiro, but was again not elected, having obtained only 480 votes.

In 2018, Lopes was a candidate from his current party, PSL, to the position of Federal Deputy for the state of Rio de Janeiro, receiving direct support from his friend and fellow party member, Jair Bolsonaro, who was elected President of Brazil. He received 345,234 votes (4.47% invalid votes) for Congress, thus becoming the most-voted candidate for Federal Deputy in the state of Rio de Janeiro in the general elections of 2018, and also the most-voted Brazilian of predominantly African descent in the history of Rio de Janeiro and Brazil.
