= João Batista Oliveira de Araujo =

Brazilian politician

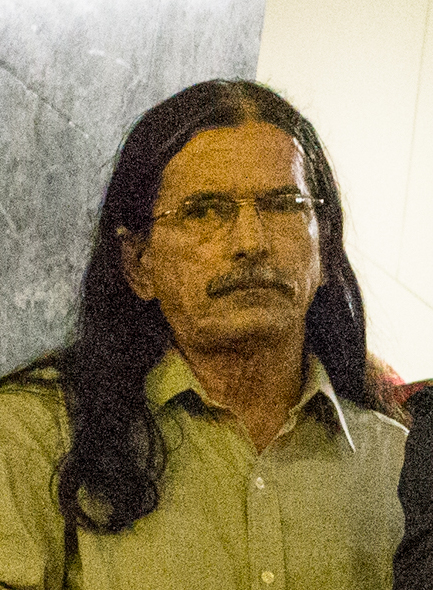

João Batista Oliveira de Araujo, also known as Babá, is a Brazilian politician. He is a former member of the Workers' Party (PT), and a founding member of the Socialism and Liberty Party (PSOL), in which he is affiliated to Socialist Workers' Current tendency.
