= Talíria Petrone =

Brazilian politician

- Petrone in 2025

Member of the Chamber of Deputies
- Incumbent
- Assumed office 1 February 2019
- Constituency: Rio de Janeiro

Member of the Municipal Chamber of Niterói
- In office 1 January 2017 – 1 February 2019
- Constituency: At-large

Personal details
- Born: Talíria Petrone Soares; 9 April 1985 (age 41) Niterói, Rio de Janeiro, Brazil
- Party: PSOL (2011–present)
- Education: State University of Rio de Janeiro; Fluminense Federal University
- Profession: Teacher

Talíria Petrone Soares (Portuguese pronunciation: [tɐliˈɾiɐ peˈtɾoni ˈswaɾis]; born 9 April 1985) is a Brazilian politician. She has spent her political career representing Rio de Janeiro, having served as federal deputy representative since 2019.

== Personal life ==
Petrone is the daughter of a musician and a teacher. She graduated with a degree in history from the Rio de Janeiro State University and with a master's degree in social work from Fluminense Federal University. Prior to entering politics, she worked as a public school teacher.

She identifies as an Afro-Brazilian, socialist, feminist, and supportive of LGBT rights. She was a close friend and inspired by late politician and activist Marielle Franco.

== Political career ==
Petrone was the most voted candidate in the 2016 election for the council of Niterói, receiving 5,121 votes. In the 2018 election Petrone was the eighth most voted candidate in the state of Rio de Janeiro, with 107,317, being elected to the federal chamber of deputies. Petrone said that she received threats from opposition supporters. In June 2019 Brazilian civil police made arrest in a plot to assassinate Petrone, which was being hatched and planned from a dark web platform starting in 2018.

In March 2022 Petrone was amongst 151 international feminists signing Feminist Resistance Against War: A Manifesto, in solidarity with the Russian Feminist Anti-War Resistance. (Note: This manifesto was criticized by both Ukrainian feminists and members of the Feminist Anti-War Resistance themselves.)
