= Socialism and Liberty Party =

Political party in Brazil

Socialism and Liberty Party Partido Socialismo e Liberdade
- Abbreviation: PSOL
- President: Paula Coradi
- Founded: 6 June 2004
- Split from: Workers' Party
- Headquarters: SDS, Edificio Venâncio V, Loja 28, Brasília
- Membership (2023): 291,552 (2019)
- Ideology: Democratic socialism; Socialism of the 21st century; Progressivism
- Political position: Left-wing to far-left
- National affiliation: PSOL REDE Federation
- International affiliation: Different groups in PSOL have different international affiliations.
- Colours: Yellow; Red; Purple; Orange
- TSE Identification Number: 50
- Chamber of Deputies: 12 / 513
- Federal Senate: 0 / 81
- Governorships: 0 / 27
- State Assemblies: 22 / 1,024
- Mayors: 0 / 5,570
- City Councillors: 80 / 56,810

Party flag

Website
- psol50.org.br

The Socialism and Liberty Party (Portuguese: Partido Socialismo e Liberdade, Brazilian Portuguese: [paʁˈtʃidu sosi.aˈlizmu i libeʁˈdadʒi, - sosjaˈlizmw -]; PSOL [ˈpsɔw, piˈsɔw]) is a left-wing political party in Brazil. The party describes itself as socialist and democratic.

The party leader is Paula Coradi and the federal deputies Ivan Valente, Talíria Petrone, Sâmia Bomfim, Fernanda Melchionna, Glauber Braga, Luiza Erundina, Erika Hilton, Chico Alencar, Célia Xakriabá, Jones Manoel, Guilherme Cortez, Pastor Henrique Vieira, Tarcísio Motta and Luciene Cavalcante, as well as the minister of the Native People Sônia Guajajara, with a number of well-known Brazilian left-wing leaders and intellectuals, such as Milton Temer, Hamilton Assis, Michael Löwy, Luciana Genro, Vladimir Safatle, Renato Roseno, Carlos Nelson Coutinho, Ricardo Antunes, Francisco de Oliveira, João Machado, Pedro Ruas and others.

PSOL was formed after Heloísa Helena, Luciana Genro, Babá and João Fontes were expelled from the Workers' Party after voting against the pension reform proposed by Luiz Inácio Lula da Silva. They opposed the decisions of Lula's government, considering them to be too conservative, and the Workers' Party alliances with controversial right-wing politicians, such as the former presidents José Sarney and Fernando Collor.

After collecting more than 438,000 signatures, PSOL became Brazil's 29th officially recognized political party, the first to do so by this method. The logo, a smiling sun, was designed by famed cartoonist and children's author Ziraldo.

== Ideology and support ==
The ideology of the party varies between the left and the far left. The programmatic elements found in the party are related to socialism, anti-capitalism, and anti-imperialism. There are Marxist, Trotskyist, eco-socialist, and labor unionist tendencies within the party. Among other things, the party program includes the reduction of working hours, agrarian and urban reform, increased spending on health, education and infrastructure, and a break with the International Monetary Fund. It also seeks to decriminalize abortion. Because it is a party formed by trends that possess the political spectrum of the left in common, they represent distinct divisions in question of origin, geographical location and composition of its leaderships. The formation of tendencies provided for in the party statute can be freely organized without direct interference from the party leadership, allowing autonomy of intra-party groups, provided they follow the political prerogatives of the party's statute and program.

=== Internal tendencies ===
Abbreviation	Name in Portuguese	Name in English	Ideology	International affiliation
APS-NE	Ação Popular Socialista - Nova Era	Socialist People's Action - New Era	Democratic socialism	
	Rebelião Ecossocialista	Ecosocialist Rebellion	Trotskyism; Mandelism; Eco-socialism	Fourth International (reunited)
	Centelhas	Sparks	Trotskyism; Mandelism; Eco-socialism	Fourth International (reunited)
	Fortalecer o PSOL	Strengthen PSOL	Trotskyism, Left-wing populism	
	Insurgência	Insurgency	Trotskyism; Mandelism; Eco-socialism	Fourth International (reunited)
LSR	Liberdade, Socialismo e Revolução	Freedom, Socialism and Revolution	Trotskyism	International Socialist Alternative
MES	Movimento Esquerda Socialista	Socialist Left Movement	Trotskyism; Morenism	Fourth International (reunited)
PS	Primavera Socialista	Socialist Spring	Democratic socialism	
	Resistência	Resistance	Trotskyism	
	Revolução Solidária	Solidarity Revolution	Left-wing populism	
SBVT	Subverta	Subvert	Trotskyism; Mandelism; Eco-socialism; Buen vivir	Fourth International (reunited)

PSOL also allows certain unregistered political parties to launch candidates through its TSE registry number. These organizations, however, cannot participate in the party's congresses. This is some organization that used PSOL electoral legend in some moment:

Abbreviation	Name in Portuguese	Name in English	Ideology
BP	Brigadas Populares	People's Brigades	Marxism–Leninism, Left-wing nationalism, Socialism of the 21st Century, Bolivarianism
MRT	Movimento Revolucionário de Trabalhadores	Workers' Revolutionary Movement	Trotskyism
PCR	Partido Comunista Revolucionário	Revolutionary Communist Party	Marxism–Leninism, Stalinism, Guevarism, Hoxhaism, Anti-revisionism
PCLCP	Polo Comunista Luiz Carlos Prestes	Luiz Carlos Prestes Communist Hub	Marxism–Leninism, Left-wing nationalism
RAiZ	Raiz - Movimento Cidadanista	Roots - Citizens' Movement	Eco-socialism, Teko Porã, Ubuntu
RC	Refundação Comunista	Communist Refoundation	Revolutionary socialism
PCBR	PCBR	Revolutionary Brazilian Communist party	Anti-Revisionism

== Members of the National Congress ==
As of April 2026.

=== Federal Deputies ===
Name	State	Internal tendency
Célia Xakriabá	Minas Gerais	Independent
Duda Salabert	Minas Gerais	Independent
Chico Alencar	Rio de Janeiro	Independent
Glauber Braga	Rio de Janeiro	Independent
Henrique Vieira	Rio de Janeiro	Revolução Solidária
Talíria Petrone	Rio de Janeiro	Subverta
Tarcísio Motta	Rio de Janeiro	Independent
Fernanda Melchionna	Rio Grande do Sul	MES
Erika Hilton	São Paulo	Revolução Solidária
Sônia Guajajara	São Paulo	Independent
Luciene Cavalcante	São Paulo	Revolução Solidária
Luiza Erundina	São Paulo	Independent
Sâmia Bomfim	São Paulo	MES

=== State Deputies ===
Name	State	Internal tendency
Hilton Coelho	Bahia	APS-NE
Renato Roseno	Ceará	Ecossocialistas
Camila Valadão	Espírito Santo	MES
Fábio Félix	Federal District	MES
Max Maciel	Federal District	Maloka Socialista
Lívia Duarte	Pará	Primavera Socialista
Dani Monteiro	Rio de Janeiro	Revolução Solidária
Flávio Serafini	Rio de Janeiro	Subverta
Professor Josemar	Rio de Janeiro	MES
Renata Souza	Rio de Janeiro	Revolução Solidária
Yuri Moura	Rio de Janeiro	Revolução Solidária
Luciana Genro	Rio Grande do Sul	MES
Matheus Gomes	Rio Grande do Sul	Semear
Marquito	Santa Catarina	Independent
Bancada Feminista	São Paulo	Semear
Carlos Giannazi	São Paulo	Revolução Solidária
Ediane Maria	São Paulo	Revolução Solidária
Guilherme Cortez	São Paulo	Semear
Mônica do Movimento Pretas	São Paulo	MES
Linda Brasil	Sergipe	Independent

== Elections ==
=== 2006 ===
PSOL launched Heloísa Helena to run for president in the 2006 elections. The vice-presidential candidate was intellectual César Benjamin. The party ran in a left-wing ticket along with two other parties: Trotskyist United Socialist Workers' Party (PSTU) and Marxist–Leninist Brazilian Communist Party (PCB).

The alliance was extended to gubernatorial elections. In Minas Gerais, for instance, Vanessa Portugal, from the PSTU, ran for governor with PSOL's support, although not with PCB's. Prominent PSOL gubernatorial candidates were Plínio de Arruda Sampaio in São Paulo, Milton Temer in Rio de Janeiro and Roberto Robaina in Rio Grande do Sul. However, they were all defeated.

Heloísa Helena finished the presidential race in third place, receiving 6.5 million votes throughout the country (6.85% of the valid votes). Three federal deputies, Luciana Genro, Chico Alencar and Ivan Valente, managed to get re-elected.

=== 2010 ===
In the 2010 candidate for presidential election Plínio de Arruda Sampaio received 888.000 votes (0.87%). Plinio presented an agrarian reform project in 1964 when he was federal deputy, but the 1964 Military Coup ended the project and Plinio lost his mandate. Although he received very few votes Plinio became famous after the elections because he was qualified as an anti-candidate.

PSOL elected three deputies again, Chico Alencar, Ivan Valente and Jean Wyllys.

Toninho do PSOL from Federal District got the best gubernatorial result. He finished in third place with 14.25%.

=== 2012 ===
In 2012 PSOL got its best results so far. Clécio Luís and Gelsimar Gonzaga were elected mayors in Macapá, Amapá's state capital, and Itaocara.

In the northern second largest city Belém and in Rio de Janeiro, PSOL finished second and elected four city councillors – the second largest group in those councils. In Belem Edmilson Rodrigues got 43.39% and in Rio de Janeiro Marcelo Freixo got 28.15%, almost 1 million votes.

Other places like São Paulo, Fortaleza, Campinas, Belo Horizonte, Curitiba, Salvador, Natal, Florianópolis, Niterói, São Gonçalo and Pelotas, PSOL got respectable results in 2012, 49 city councillors from PSOL were elected.

=== 2014 ===
PSOL initially nominated Randolfe Rodrigues, the Senator for Amapá, as their candidate for president in 2014, with former federal deputy and party co-founder Luciana Genro as his running mate. Federal deputy Chico Alencar of Rio de Janeiro and attorney Renato Roseno also ran for the party's nomination. However, he was replaced at the top of the ticket by Genro, a member of the Left Socialist Movement faction. She got 1,612,186 votes finishing in 4th place.

Genro's campaign received the support of important Brazilian intellectuals and celebrities. These included like Chico de Oliveira, Rogério Arantes, Vladimir Safatle, Michel Löwy, Gregorio Duvivier, Valesca Popozuda, Zélia Duncan, Karina Buhr, Clara Averbuck, Marina Lima, Juca Kfouri, Preta Gil, Laerte Coutinho, Marcelo Yuka and the international popstar Jessica Sutta. Her candidacy was well-regarded in the LGBT community.

PSOL elected 5 federal deputies and 12 state deputies. Marcelo Freixo (RJ) received the highest vote for a state deputy in Brazil with 350,408 votes. Carlos Giannazi was the leftist most voted in São Paulo with 164,929 votes.

Gubernatorial candidates Tarcísio Motta (RJ) with 8.92% (14.62% in city of Rio Janeiro) and Robério Paulino (RN) with 8.74% (22.45% in capital Natal) got excellent results. Senate candidate Heloísa Helena (AL) got 31.86%, but she lost the election to former Brazilian president Fernando Collor de Mello, who was impeached.

=== 2018 ===
In 2018, PSOL chose prolific labor leader Guilherme Boulos as their nominee for the presidency. Boulos's close affiliation with former President Lula led to concern that his nomination would erode PSOL's distinct identity. It was alleged that party leadership pushed Boulos at the expense of other pre-candidates for the party's nomination, including economist (and son of 2010 presidential nominee Plínio de Arruda Sampaio) Plínio de Arruda Sampaio Jr., activist and educator Hamilton Assis, and academic Nildo Ouriques. Indigenous leader Sônia Guajajara, who initially sought the party's nomination, was chosen to serve as his vice presidential running mate.

=== 2022 ===
On 30 April, PSOL made official its support for the pre-candidacy of Luiz Inácio Lula da Silva (PT) for the presidency. The party approved its support during electoral conference. On the 7 May, PT made official the pre-candidacy of ex-president Lula and ex-governor of São Paulo Geraldo Alckmin (PSB) to run for president. In June, a group of PSOL affiliates created a dissident movement of the party in protest against the support to the pre-candidacy of former president Luiz Inácio Lula da Silva (PT) and former governor Geraldo Alckmin (PSB) for the presidency.

== Electoral results ==
=== Presidential elections ===
Election	Candidate	Running mate	Coalition	First round		Second round		Result
Election	Candidate	Running mate	Coalition	Votes	%	Votes	%	Result
2006	Heloísa Helena	César Benjamin	PSOL; PCB; PSTU	6,575,393	6.8% (#3)	-	-	Lost ✗
2010	Plínio de Arruda Sampaio	Hamilton Assis	N/A	886,816	0.87% (#4)	-	-	Lost ✗
2014	Luciana Genro	Jorge Paz	N/A	1,612,186	1.55% (#4)	-	-	Lost ✗
2018	Guilherme Boulos	Sônia Guajajara	PSOL; PCB	617,122	0.58% (#10)	-	-	Lost ✗
2022	Luiz Inácio Lula da Silva (PT)	Geraldo Alckmin (PSB)	PT; PCdoB; PV; PSOL; REDE; PSB; Solidariedade; Avante; Agir	57,259,405	48.4% (#1)	60,325,504	50.9% (#1)	Won ✓
2026	Luiz Inácio Lula da Silva (PT)	Geraldo Alckmin (PSB)	PT; PCdoB; PV; PSB; PDT; PSOL; REDE	53,879,538	45.16% (#2)	64,256,232	51.79% (#1)	Won ✓

=== Legislative elections ===
Election	Chamber of Deputies				Federal Senate				Role in government
Election	Votes	%	Seats	+/–	Votes	%	Seats	+/–	Role in government
2006	1,149,619	1.23%	3 / 513	New	351,527	0.42%	1 / 81	New	Opposition
2010	1,142,737	1.18%	3 / 513	0	3,041,854	1.78%	2 / 81	▲1	Opposition
2014	1,745,470	1.79%	5 / 513	▲2	1,045,275	1.17%	1 / 81	▼1	Independent (2015–2016)
2014	1,745,470	1.79%	5 / 513	▲2	1,045,275	1.17%	1 / 81	▼1	Opposition (2016–2018)
2018	2,783,669	2.83%	10 / 513	▲5	5,273,853	3.08%	0 / 81	▼1	Opposition
2022 (Note: Ran in federation with the Sustainability Network.)	3,852,246	3.52%	12 / 513	▲2	675,244	0.68%	0 / 81	0	Coalition
2026	5,321,161	4.67%	14 / 513	▲2	8,028,938	3.87%	0 / 81	0	Coalition

Preceded by 45 – BSDP (PSDB)	Numbers of Brazilian Official Political Parties; 50 – SOLP (PSOL)	Succeeded by 55 – SDP (PSD)
