= 2026 in Brazil =

Events in the year 2026 in Brazil.

== Incumbents ==
=== Federal government ===
- President
  - Luiz Inácio Lula da Silva
- Vice President
  - Geraldo Alckmin
- President of the Chamber of Deputies
  - Hugo Motta
- President of the Federal Senate
  - Davi Alcolumbre
- President of the Supreme Federal Court
  - Edson Fachin

== Events ==
=== January ===
- 2 January – A truck collides with a bus in Rio Grande do Sul, killing 11 people and injuring seven others.
- 8 January –
  - President Lula vetoes a bill that would have reduced the prison sentence of former president Jair Bolsonaro over the 2022–2023 Brazilian coup plot from 27 years to two.
  - A court in Minas Gerais sentences a former Roman Catholic priest based in Contagem to 24 years' imprisonment for raping a minor in 2016.
- 14 January – Four people are killed in a police operation against the Comando Vermelho in the Salgueiro favela of Rio de Janeiro.
- 22 January – Anvisa bans the sale, distribution, manufacturing, import, advertising, and use of medications based on tirzepatide from unlicensed companies.

=== February ===
- 3 February – A bus veers off a road and overturns in São José da Tapera, Alagoas, killing 16 people.
- 6–22 February – Brazil at the 2026 Winter Olympics
  - 14 February – Ski racer Lucas Pinheiro Braathen becomes the first athlete representing Brazil and a South American country to win a medal in the Winter Olympics after achieving gold in the men’s giant slalom at the 2026 Winter Olympics in Italy.
- 16 February – A bus overturns along the BR-153 near Marilia, São Paulo State, killing six people.
- 21 February – Brazil and India sign an agreement to strengthen cooperation on critical minerals and rare earth elements.
- 23 February – Brazil announces that it will revoke a decree expanding the waterways in the Amazon rainforest under a federal privatization program following protests by Indigenous groups.
- 23 February – At least 64 people are killed while five others are reported missing following flash flooding in Juiz de Fora and Ubá, Minas Gerais.
- 25 February – The Supreme Federal Court convicts five people, including police chief Rivaldo Barbosa and politicians Chiquinho Brazão and his brother Domingos Brazão, for the 2018 assassination of Rio de Janeiro city councilor Marielle Franco and her driver and sentences them to up to 76 years' imprisonment.

=== March ===
- 4 March –
  - Banco Master scandal: The Supreme Federal Court orders the arrest of former Banco Master president and major shareholder Daniel Vorcaro in a potential fraud case worth up to 12 billion reais.
  - The Federal Senate ratifies the EU–Mercosur Partnership Agreement.
- 5 March – A nursing home collapses in Belo Horizonte, killing eight people and leaving four missing.
- 10 March – Ski racer Cristian Ribera becomes the first athlete representing Brazil to win a medal in the Paralympics after achieving silver in the para-cross-country skiing men's seated sprint at the 2026 Winter Paralympics in Italy.
- 14 March –
  - President Lula revokes the visa of US diplomat Darren Beattie after the latter tries to visit former president Jair Bolsonaro in prison.
  - Three Israeli nationals are arrested after clashing with pro-Palestine demonstrators in Itacare.
- 17 March – A law restricting access to social media by minors comes into effect.
- 18 March – Eight people, including Comando Vermelho commander Claudio Augusto dos Santos, are killed in police raids across Rio de Janeiro.
- 20 March – Fernando Haddad resigns as finance minister after announcing that he would run for governor of Sao Paulo.

=== April ===
- 29 April – The Federal Senate rejects Attorney-General Jorge Messias' nomination to the Supreme Federal Court in a 34–42 vote, the first time since 1894 that a presidential nominee to the court has been rejected.
- 30 April – Congress overrides president Lula's veto of a bill that would have reduced former president Bolsonaro's prison sentence.

=== May ===
- 1 May – The EU–Mercosur Partnership Agreement comes into effect.
- 14 May – After 68 years on the air, Eldorado FM radio is ceasing operations in São Paulo.
- 5 May – Two people are killed in a school shooting in Rio Branco, Acre.
- 28 May – The United States designates the Primeiro Comando da Capital and the Comando Vermelho as terrorist organizations.

=== June ===
- 8 June – Police in Roraima rescue 108 Cuban migrants attempting to enter the country from Guyana and arrest five suspected human traffickers.
- 11 June–19 July – Brazil participates at the 2026 FIFA World Cup.
- 13 June – A 21-year-old woman dies after two rope jumping instructors throw her from a bridge in Limeira without harnessing her to safety equipment.
- 14 June – Six people, including American musician Oliver Tree, are killed when two helicopters collide over Rio de Janeiro.
- 16 June –
  - The Supreme Federal Court sentences Eduardo Bolsonaro to four years and two months' imprisonment for trying to involve the United States in the trial of his father, former president Jair Bolsonaro, over the 2022–2023 Brazilian coup plot.
  - Twenty-five people, including 18 Venezuelan nationals, are arrested in Roraima as part of an operation against the Tren de Aragua.

=== July ===
- 24 July – The United States imposes a 12.5% tariff on Brazil, citing the presence of alleged forced labour in the supply chain. The United States Government also imposes tariffs ranging between 10 and 12.5% on 59 other countries.
- 27 July – The Theatro da Paz in Belem and the Amazon Theatre in Manaus are designated as UNESCO World Heritage Sites.

=== August ===
- 8 August – A helicopter crashes into the Tijuca National Park near Rio de Janeiro, killing four people including three Colombian nationals.
- 13 August – Eight illustrations by Henri Matisse that were stolen in a 2025 heist from the Mário de Andrade Library in São Paulo are recovered by police at a house in São Bernardo do Campo.
- 18 August – Petrobras announces the discovery of a petroleum field off the coast of Amapá.
- 19 August – A minibus collides with a truck near Ipiranga, Paraná, killing 23 people.

=== September ===
- 17 September – President Lula signs a decree to increase the benefits of the Bolsa Familia program by 15%.
- 20 September – The Superior Electoral Court rejects a petition to extend voting time amidst Simchat Torah, which falls on 4 October, the day of the nation's first round of elections.
- 21 September – A helicopter crashes in Santa Catarina, killing all five people on board including singer Rick Sollo.
- 25 September – President Lula issues a provisional order banning online gambling and sports betting.

=== October ===
- 4 October
  - 2026 Brazilian general election (first round): No presidential candidate wins a majority in the first round, with Flavio Bolsonaro gaining 47% of the vote over incumbent president Luiz Inácio Lula da Silva's 45%.
  - 2026 Brazilian gubernatorial elections
- 9 October – Police kill a man who threatens 13 children with a knife at a school in Curitiba for more than two hours.
- 25 October – 2026 Brazilian general election (second round): Lula da Silva is reelected as president with 51% of the vote against Flavio Bolsonaro.

=== November ===
- 6 November – The roof of a four-story building collapses in São Paulo, injuring four people.
- 21 November – Former president Jair Bolsonaro was moved into an intensive care unit, after being admitted in the previous day for abdominal pain and an acute intestinal obstruction.

== Holidays ==
- 1 January – New Year's Day
- 16–17 February – Carnival
- 3 April – Good Friday
- 21 April – Tiradentes's Day
- 1 May – Labour Day
- 4 June – Feast of Corpus Christi
- 7 September – Independence Day
- 12 October – Our Lady of Aparecida
- 2 November – All Souls' Day
- 15 November – Republic Day
- 20 November – Black Consciousness Day
- 25 December – Christmas Day
- 31 December — New Year's Eve

== Deaths ==
- January 6 – Alex Felipe, 32, futsal player (Sporting CP, Norilsk Nickel, national team)
- January 10 – Isabel Veloso, 19, social media influencer
- January 24 – Constantino de Oliveira Júnior, 57, founder and CEO (2004–2012) of Gol Linhas Aéreas
- February 4 – Ricardo Schnetzer, 72, voice actor
- February 13 – José Álvaro Moisés, 81, political scientist.
- April 17 – Oscar Schmidt, 68, Hall of Fame basketball player (JuveCaserta, Corinthians, national team).
- April 18 – Oscar Andrade, 68, deputy (1996–2003).
- April 19 – Gerardo Renault, 96, Minas Gerais MLA (1968–1978), deputy (1978–1986).
- April 27 – Luciana Novaes, 42, social worker, politician, and Rio de Janeiro city councilwoman.
- May 4 – Hermano da Silva Ramos, 100, French-Brazilian racing driver (Formula One).
- May 2 – Raimundo Rodrigues Pereira, 85, journalist.
- May 5 – Guto Graça Mello, 78, composer and music producer.
- May 23 – Gabriel Ganley, 22, bodybuilder and social media influencer.
- June 9 – Orlando Senna, 86, film director (Iracema: Uma Transa Amazônica).
- June 11 – Brito, 86, football player.
- June 14 –
  - Oliver Tree, 32, American singer-songwriter.
  - Lucas Frota, 27, record producer, musician, and DJ.
- June 19 – Brasão, 44, footballer (Athletico Paranaense, Santa Cruz, Salgaocar).
- July 3 – Lydia Möcklinghoff, 45, German ecologist and zoologist.
- July 7 – Benedito Ruy Barbosa, 95, telenovela writer (Pantanal, O Rei do Gado, Terra Nostra).
- July 16 – Renato Machado, 83, newscaster and journalist (TV Globo).
- July 26 – Octavio Gallotti, 95, minister (1984–2000) and president (1991, 1993–1995) of the Supreme Federal Court.
- August 3 – Allan Nascimento, 34, mixed martial artist (UFC).
- August 18 – Glória Menezes, 91, actress.
- September 9 – Jackson Nascimento, 102, football player (Athletico Paranaense, Corinthians) and manager (Athletico Paranaense).
- September 14 – Aracy Amaral, 96, art historian and curator, director of the Pinacoteca do Estado de São Paulo (1975–1979) and the Museum of Contemporary Art, University of São Paulo (1982–1986).
- September 15 –
  - Amelinha Teles, 81, journalist and political activist.
  - Paulo César Martin, 62, journalist and radio host (Folha de S.Paulo, TV Globo, Conrad Editora).
- September 22 – Rick Sollo, 59, singer-songwriter (Rick & Renner) and Sertanejo music producer.
- September 26 – Pedro Antônio Marchetti Fedalto, 100, Roman Catholic prelate, auxiliary bishop (1966–1970) and archbishop (1970–2004) of Curitiba.
- October 13 – Netinho, 60, singer.
- October 18 –
  - Lua Blanco, 39, actress (Rebelde, Soulbound) and singer (Rebeldes).
  - Benito di Paula, 84, singer-songwriter ("Charlie Brown").
- November 6 – Bismarck, 36, footballer (Fortaleza, Espérance de Tunis).
- November 13 – Claudette Soares, 91, singer.

== See also ==
- History of Brazil (1985–present)
- Mercosur
- Organization of American States
- Organization of Ibero-American States
- Community of Portuguese Language Countries
- Miss Bumbum
