= Rivaldo (given name) =

Rivaldo is a masculine given name. Many football players have their name as Rivaldo. It was originally from Portugal and Brazil.

It has become popular in countries like Portugal, Brazil, Spain, Russia, United States, Argentina, and Italy.

== Notable people ==
Rivaldo may refer to:

- Rivaldo (Rivaldo Vítor Borba Ferreira; born 1972), Brazilian former footballer
- Rivaldo Barbosa (chief of police), Brazilian chief of police
- Rivaldo Barbosa de Souza (born 1985), Brazilian footballer
- Rivaldo Coetzee (born 1996), South African footballer
- Rivaldo Costa Amaral Filho (born 1978), Brazilian footballer
- Rivaldo Fairweather (born 2002), American football player
- Rivaldo González (born 1987), Paraguayan footballer
- Rivaldo Morais (born 2000), Cape Verdean footballer
