= Luiz Mariano =

Brazilian police officer (1938–2000)

Luiz Mariano dos Santos

Personal details
- Born: October 12, 1938 Rio de Janeiro, Brazil
- Died: January 29, 2000 (aged 61) Rio de Janeiro, Brazil
- Profession: Police officer, football coach

Luiz Mariano dos Santos (October 12, 1938 – January 29, 2000) was a Brazilian police officer and football coach.

== Biography ==
A member of the Scuderie Detetive Le Cocq, he was one of the people responsible for the death of bandit Cara de Cavalo. Many members of the Escuderia Le Cocq, whose objective was to repress crime, executed bandits over time, leading them to be given the acronym EM, in popular usage, referring to death squad.

Delegate Sivuca, among others, was part of the Special Police responsible for Getúlio Vargas' personal guard, but after this police force was replaced with the State of Guanabara in 1960, he joined others like Detetive, the Civil Police of the New State, which through the Secretary of Public Security Luís França became part of the "twelve golden men" of the Rio de Janeiro police, with the objective of "cleaning up the city". With the death of Detective Milton Le Cocq by bandit Cara de Cavalo, they created the Scuderie Detetive Le Cocq, which was symbolized by a skull with two crossed tibia bones underneath, and the acronym E.M., which, in fact, symbolized the Motorized Squadron that Sivuca once belonged to when he was part of the Special Police. Cara de Cavalo was killed at the time (in the 1960s) with more than 50 shots, with police officers Sivuca and Luís Mariano among his executioners..

In 1990, he was granted citizenship of the State of Rio de Janeiro; in 1992, he took over the Police Internal Affairs Department. During the 1990s, he was the director of the General Department of Specialized Police (DGPE) of the Civil Police. Outside of the DGPE, he was a member of Portuguesa Carioca and a football coach of São Cristóvão and Botafogo, which gave the black and white team from Rio the nickname "Time do Camburão" (Time of the Police Van), for having two police officers at the head of its Technical Department: Luiz Mariano, as coach, and Hélio Vígio, as physical trainer.

Mariano died on 29 January in Rio de Janeiro, at the age of 61.
