= Rivaldo Barbosa =

Rivaldo Barbosa may refer to:

- Rivaldo Barbosa (chief of police) (born 1969), Brazilian professor and chief of police
- Rivaldo (footballer, born 1985), Brazilian former footballer
