= Sivuca (police officer) =

Brazilian police officer (1930 - 2021)

José Guilherme Godinho Ferreira

State Deputy of Rio de Janeiro
- In office 15 March 1990 – 31 December 1994
- In office 1 January 1995 – 31 December 1998

Personal details
- Born: September 22, 1930; Valença, Bahia, Brazil
- Died: August 15, 2021 (aged 90); Rio de Janeiro, Brazil
- Political party: Liberal Front Party (PFL); Progressive Reform Party (PPR)
- Profession: Politician and police officer

José Guilherme Godinho Ferreira (September 22, 1930 — August 15, 2021), also known as Sivuca, was a Brazilian police officer and politician.

== Biography ==
A member of the Scuderie Detetive Le Cocq, he was one of those responsible for the death of the bandit Cara de Cavalo. Many of the members of the Escuderia Le Cocq, whose objective was to repress crime, executed bandits over time, which led to them being given the acronym EM, in popular terms, referring to the death squad. “A good bandit is a dead bandit!” was the successful slogan of the electoral campaign used by José Guilherme Godinho, Sivuca, when he was Police Chief of Rio de Janeiro, to be elected State Deputy in the mid-80s (1986), and public posts in the center of RJ had posters with this slogan.slogan.

Delegate Sivuca was part of the Special Police, which was responsible for the personal guard of Getúlio Vargas, but with the abolition of this police force with the creation of the State of Guanabara in 1960, he joined the Civil Police of the New State, along with others, as a Detective, which, through the Secretary of Public Security Luís França, became part of the “twelve golden men” of the Rio de Janeiro police, with the objective of “cleaning up the city”. With the death of Detective Milton Le Cocq by the famous bandit Cara de Cavalo, they created the Scuderie Detetive Le Cocq, which was symbolized by a skull with two crossed tibia bones underneath, and the acronym E.M., which, in fact, symbolized the Motorized Squadron that Delegate Sivuca himself had once been part of when he was part of the Special Police. Legend has it that the bandit Cara de Cavalo was killed at the time (in the 1960s) with more than 50 shots, with police officers Sivuca and Luís Mariano among his executioners.

He was elected state deputy for the Liberal Front Party (PFL) in the 1990 state elections in Rio de Janeiro and reelected in the 1994 state elections in Rio de Janeiro, for the Progressive Reform Party (PPR).

In 2021, Sivuca died at the age of ninety in Rio de Janeiro, due to complications related to COVID-19, amid the COVID-19 pandemic in Brazil.
