= Rádio Clube (Ponta Grossa) =

Rádio Clube (ZYX955)
Ponta Grossa, Paraná; Brazil
- Broadcast area: Campos Gerais of Paraná

Programming
- Language: Brazilian Portuguese
- Format: News/talk
- Affiliations: Rádio Bandeirantes

Ownership
- Owner: Carlos Alberto Mayer; (Rádio Clube Pontagrossense Ltda)

History
- First air date: January 21, 1940
- Former call signs: PRJ2
- Former frequencies: 1250 kHz (1940–2017)

Technical information
- Licensing authority: ANATEL
- Class: A3
- ERP: 6.24 kW
- Transmitter coordinates: 25°05′46″S 50°09′31″W

Links
- Webcast: Live Player
- Website: prj2.com.br

Rádio Clube (also known as Rádio Clube Pontagrossense or informally PR-J2) is a Brazilian radio station from Ponta Grossa, Paraná, an affiliate of Bandeirantes Radio Network. The station covers, in addition to Ponta Grossa, municipalities such as Carambeí, Castro, Ipiranga, Palmeira, Jaguariaíva and Telemaco Borba, operating since August 10, 2017 at 94.1 MHz FM. It is the oldest radio station in activity in the Paraná.

== History ==
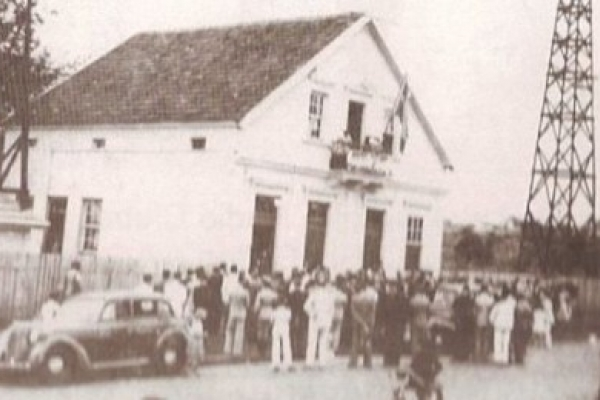
First address of the station, to the right the tower of the same

The station was founded by entrepreneurs Abilio Holzmann and Manoel Machuca (the first to use the microphone) on January 21, 1940, together with former governor Manoel Ribas, the Maneco Falcão. It is the oldest radio in the interior of Paraná and the second oldest in the state. In fact the station had obtained the authorization to operate on September 15, 1939, but officially began its operations a year later. It initially operated with 250 watts on 1250 kHz, with the first studio in the Street Ernesto Vilela, 96, the transmission tower is next. Its original call sign was PRJ2, so to this day it is also called that. Subsequently, other radio stations appeared, forming the Paranaense Network of Broadcasters, with stations in Paraná and Santa Catarina (Paranaguá, Curitiba, Rio Negro, Canoinhas, Lapa, Irati and Londrina). Holzmann besides being in the direction, would accompany the journalistic and sportive team.

In 1982, Machuca and Holzmann sold to a political group. The Holzmann Group stayed with the Central Radio (now Massa FM). Some employees remained during this transition period.

On April 19, 2018, Rogério Serman, who had a leading audience program in the morning, died, the speaker was also vice mayor and programming director of the radio. By the bill (PL) 213/2018 the councilman Sebastião Mainardes (DEM) proposes to pay homage to the former politician and broadcaster giving his name to the Lake of Olarias.
