= Mônica Benício =

Brazilian architect and politician

- Benício in 2019

Councilwoman for Rio de Janeiro
- Incumbent
- Assumed office 1 January 2021

Personal details
- Born: Mônica Tereza Azeredo Benício; 1 February 1986 (age 40) Rio de Janeiro, Brazil
- Party: PSOL
- Spouse: Marielle Franco (d. 2018)
- Education: Pontifical Catholic University of Rio de Janeiro

Mônica Tereza Azeredo Benício (born 1 February 1986) is a Brazilian architect, urbanist, feminist, and LGBT+ rights and human rights activist. She is currently a councilwoman with the Socialism and Liberty Party (PSOL) in the city of Rio de Janeiro, having assumed office in 2021. She is the widow of councilwoman Marielle Franco.

== Biography ==
Benício was born in Conjunto Esperança, one of the 16 favelas of the Complexo da Maré neighborhood of Rio de Janeiro. In 2004, she graduated from local schools and matriculated in the community pre-vestibular at the Centro de Estudos e Ações Solidárias da Maré (CEASM). In 2007, she began graduate studies in psychology, two years after transferring to the Architecture and Urbanism school of the Pontifical Catholic University of Rio de Janeiro, PUC-Rio.

In 2014, she graduated, her graduate thesis being comUNIDADE - Requalification of the Area of Conflict in the Favela of Maré. In 2019, she presented her masters dissertation at the same university, titled Every world. Just one world. A Maré of the city: violence, public spaces, and urban intervention.

In 2020, she was elected councilwoman for the city of Rio de Janeiro, being the 11th most voted for candidate. She ran on a feminist, antifascist, and people-centered campaign.

In 2022, law 7291/2022, put together by Benício, came into effect, which instituted the Municipal Program of Confronting Femicide. The law, which confronts and attempts to prevent femicide. That same year, she proposed a law that established the Municipal Day of Lesbian Visibility, which came into effect later that year. The law was originally proposed by her partner Marielle Franco and had presented the proposed law in the Municipal Chamber in 2017, but it had been voted down. She is also the author of law 7326/2022 that instituted the Program of Support and Welcoming of LGBTQIA+ People to address the violence against and the social vulnerability of LGBTQIA+ people, through different means to help.

== Personal life ==
Marielle and Monica met during a trip with friends, when they were 18 and 24 years old, respectively. During this time, they had previously only had relationships with men. In 2005, they began to date. During their time together over the years, they had periods of separation in their relationship. These periods were caused by lesbophobia within their families and by society at large, which led Marielle to pursue relationships with men during the times they were separated. In 2015, they formalized their union together. At the time of Marielle's assassination, the couple lived together in Tijuca with Marielle's child from a previous relationship. The two had planned to get married on 7 September 2019.

After Marielle's assassination, Monica took up the mantle of her partner's social justice activism, travelling abroad to talk about the legacy and memory of her partner in search of international support, with hopes of identifying the people who murdered her and those who ordered the assassination.
