= Assassination of Marielle Franco =

2018 murder in Rio de Janeiro, Brazil

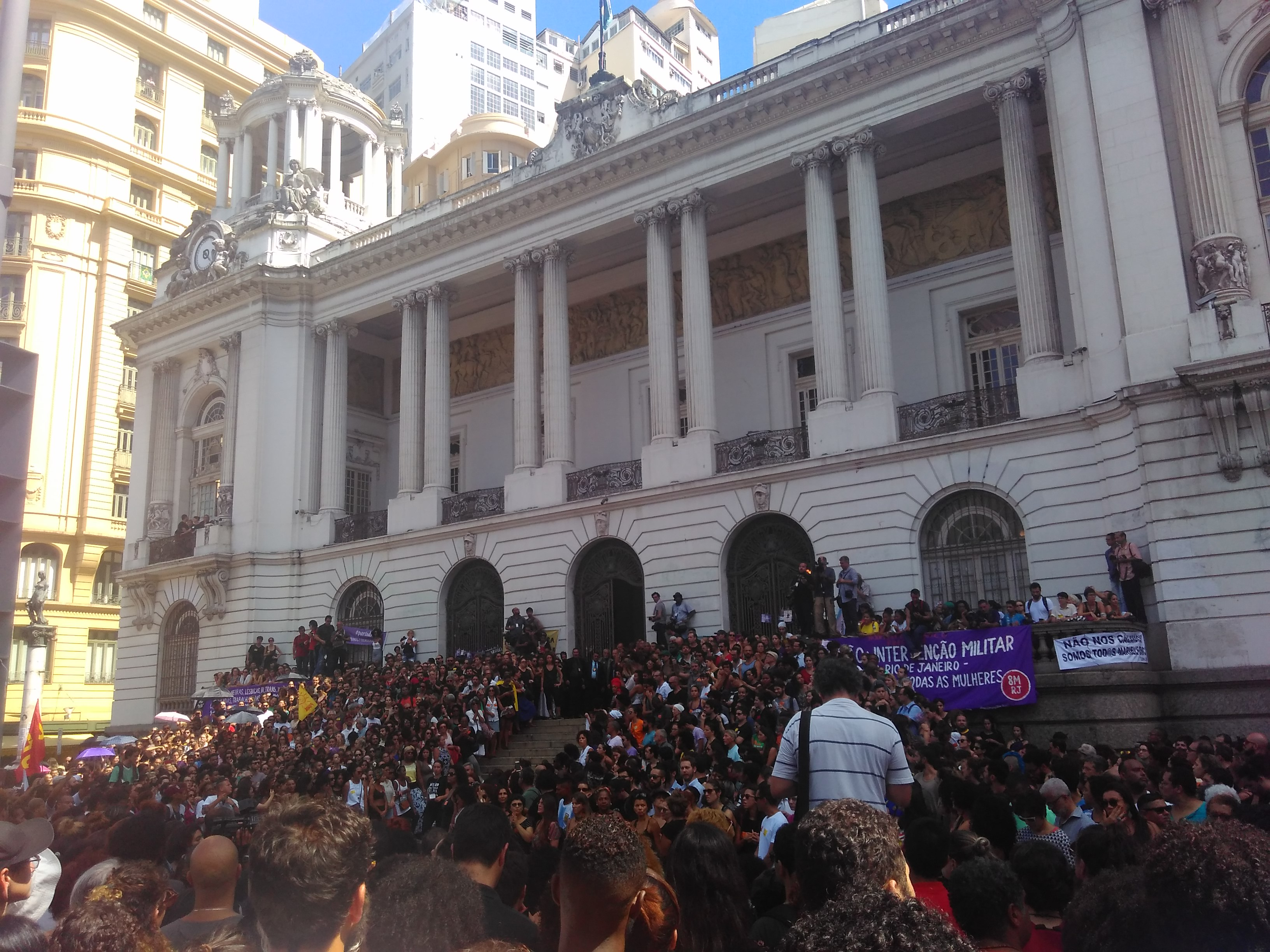
- Funeral at Pedro Ernesto Palace
- Location: Estácio, Rio de Janeiro, Brazil
- Date: 14 March 2018 (8 years ago); 09:30 pm (UTC-3)
- Target: Marielle Franco; Anderson Gomes
- Weapon: HK MP5
- Deaths: 2
- Injuries: 1
- No. of participants: 2 (Ronnie Lessa, Élcio Vieira de Queiroz)

Marielle Franco, a Brazilian politician and activist, was fatally shot on 14 March 2018, in Estácio, Rio de Janeiro, Brazil. The assassins were in a car that pulled up alongside the Rio de Janeiro councilwoman's car and fired several shots, which also killed the driver, Anderson Gomes. Former military police officers Ronnie Lessa and Élcio Vieira de Queiroz confessed to the killings and, on 31 October 2024, were convicted by a jury and sentenced to 59 and 78 years in prison, respectively.

On 24 March 2024, brothers Domingos Brazão and Chiquinho Brazão were arrested after being denounced as masterminds of the attack against Marielle Franco. Detective Rivaldo Barbosa was also arrested, suspected of obstructing the investigations and also intellectually orchestrating the crime. On 25 February 2026, Chiquinho and Domingos Brazão were unanimously convicted by the Supreme Court for ordering the hit against Marielle and Anderson Gomes and both were sentenced to 76 years in prison.

== Assassination ==
Marielle arrived at the Casa das Pretas, on rua dos Inválidos, in Lapa, to mediate a debate promoted by the Socialism and Liberty Party (PSOL) with young black women, around 7:00 pm. According to images obtained by the police, a Cobalt with a Nova Iguaçu license plate, a city in the Baixada Fluminense region of Rio de Janeiro, was parked near the venue.

Around 11:00 pm, Marielle left the Casa das Pretas with an aide and a driver and was soon followed by a car of the same model that had been parked near the site. Around 11:30 PM, on Joaquim Paralhes Street in Estácio, thirteen shots were fired from a vehicle pulled up next to Marielle's car. Nine hit the car frame and four hit the windows. The councilwoman was hit by three shots to the head and one to the neck and the driver was shot at least three times in the back, killing them both. The aide was hit by shrapnel, taken to a hospital, and was later released. Police stated that they believe her car was pursued for about four kilometers. The executioners fled the scene without taking any property.

== Investigation ==
Images taken from local cameras revealed that a second vehicle might have provided cover for the criminals who fired the shots. In addition, other images showed two men sitting inside a vehicle for two hours at the site of an event that the councilwoman had attended shortly before. According to the police, the ammunition used, a 9mm caliber, cannot be sold to civilians in general. Rede Globo reported that the ammunition belonged to a batch sold to the Federal Police, a fact confirmed by the Civil Police. Investigators believed that the councilwoman was followed from the Lapa event, for four kilometers, until she passed through a place of less traffic, where the attack took place.

Chief of police Rivaldo Barbosa was investigating the possibility of an execution, since the passengers' belongings were not taken by the shooters and the councilwoman was an activist in poor communities, having been active in defense of the human rights of the residents of these localities, especially black people and women, and had even denounced killings by police officers. On the Saturday before the crime, Marielle had denounced on social networks the 41st Military Police Battalion, in Acari, which had been indicated by the Public Security Institute as the deadliest in the previous five years.

Forensics discovered that the 9mm caliber ammunition that killed the Rio de Janeiro councilwoman was from the same batch as part of the projectiles used in the largest massacre in the state of São Paulo. The murders of seventeen people occurred in Barueri and Osasco Greater São Paulo, on 13 August 2015. Three military police officers and a civil guard were convicted of these killings. According to the Civil Police of Rio de Janeiro, this lot had been sold to the Federal Police of Brasília by the company Companhia Brasileira de Cartuchos on 29 December 2006. Technical analysis also revealed that the ammunition was original. That is, it was not reloaded because the primer, which causes the propellant to ignite, was original. The Federal Police opened an investigation to determine the origin of the ammunition and how it arrived in Rio de Janeiro.

The Extraordinary Minister of Public Security, Raul Jungmann, said that the ammunition used was stolen from the Post Office headquarters in Paraíba, years before. PF sources said that the lot with two million rounds was widely distributed among the corporation's units and that the units in São Paulo and the Federal District received the largest amount, more than two hundred thousand rounds each. In addition, the minister said that the Federal Police had already appointed a fingerprint and DNA expert to examine the ammunition, and would compare the results with its database, in order to find out who committed the crime.

On 18 March, the police received an anonymous tip and discovered, in Minas Gerais, a car that could have been used in the murder of the councilwoman. The car, with Rio de Janeiro plates, was suspected to have been abandoned on 15 March, but since the police only received the tip on Saturday, the vehicle was seized around 9 pm that day. Rede Globo also released new images, in which one can see the white car that Marielle was riding in passing and being followed by two silver-colored vehicles. The police are also investigating the hypothesis that Marielle's assassins had been monitoring the councilwoman through social networks, since she made a call on the Internet the day before the event on Rua dos Inválidos, from where she left before she was murdered.

On 1 April, O Globo newspaper published a story in which two witnesses, who were not interviewed by police, gave details of the crime scene. The journalists heard separately from the two witnesses who had similar versions of the crime. They said that the assassins' car rammed the vehicle driving Marielle, almost driving up onto the sidewalk. Contrary to the camera images, these people only saw one car at the scene. Also according to their accounts, a black man was in the back seat and extended his arm out, carrying a long-barreled gun with a device that looked like a silencer. The car then swerved and fled down Joaquim Palhares Street, not Joao Paulo Primeiro Street, as the police suspected. The witnesses claimed that military police officers ordered them away from the scene of the murder, without listening to them. GloboNews asked the Civil Police about the attitude of not hearing the witnesses, but did not receive a response from them. However, an investigator told the newspaper that the councilwoman's projects were under analysis and that the agendas were considered to generate conflicts with certain groups, including militiamen. The week before, Rio de Janeiro's Security Secretary, General Richard Nunes, admitted that political motivations for the crime were undeniable.

On 10 April, the investigators in charge of the case found fingerprints on partial fragments of the 9mm shells used in the murder. The shells were found at the corner of João Paulo I and Joaquim Palhares streets, in Estácio, where the attack took place. Eight were from the same lot sold by Companhia Brasileira de Cartuchos to the Federal Police Department in Brasilia and distributed throughout the country. The ninth shell was part of an imported shipment, and, according to investigators, had special characteristics, similar to a projectile fired in a homicide that took place elsewhere in the metropolitan region of the state. The fingerprints were fragmented, which made it difficult to compare them with the fingerprints stored in the databases of the Civil and Federal Police, but it would still be possible to compare them with the fingerprints of suspects in the crime.

On 6 May, RecordTV aired a report that pointed out errors in the investigation. The station reported that the car used by the victims was abandoned in the courtyard of the homicide police station for 40 days without all the evaluations and exams being completed. According to the report, the bodies of the councilwoman and the driver did not undergo X-ray examinations, since the state did not have the equipment. The TV program also predicted - which would be days later confirmed by the police - that Marielle and Anderson were not killed by a pistol as investigators thought, but by a HK MP5 submachine gun, which are not easily seized from criminals, being used by elite troops. Record also recalled that City Hall cameras on the street where the crime occurred were turned off days before the double homicide. Alleging secrecy, authorities and official bodies did not want to comment on the report.

On 8 May, a witness told police that Councilman Marcello Siciliano and former military police officer Orlando Oliveira de Araújo Curicica wanted Councilwoman Marielle Franco dead. According to the witness, the motivation was Marielle's community actions in areas of interest to the militia in the West Zone. The information was reported in the newspaper O Globo, according to which the witness said that she was forced to work for Orlando and told in detail the entire planning of the execution. The person cited as a witness reported that he was present at meetings between Orlando and Siciliano, since June 2017. Also according to the account, Orlando had said in a meeting that the councilwoman was getting in his way and commented to Siciliano that the situation needed to be resolved quickly. In three statements, the witness reported dates, times and meetings between the two men, and provided the names of four men chosen for the murder, which are now being investigated by the police. The order for the assassination was given from inside the cell of the Bangu 9 penitentiary, where Siciliano was being held.

On 11 May, the police conducted a reenactment of the crime, which took five hours between late night and early morning. The goal was to reenact the moment when the assassins shot at the car that Marielle and Anderson were in, shooting with real weapons and ammunition, so that witnesses could hear the sound of the weapon used in the crime. The police concluded that the assassins used an HK MP5 submachine gun, a weapon capable of firing eight hundred rounds per minute. Four witnesses participated in the crime simulation, including Marielle Franco's parliamentary aide, who was the sole survivor and moved out of Brazil shortly after the councilwoman's murder.

In October, there was a breakthrough in the investigation. The Public Ministry of Rio de Janeiro (MPRJ) announced that the use of information technology allowed the identification of the shooter's biotype. In addition, the analysis of images discovered other places where the car of the suspects had been driven by. The Ministry notified the councilwoman's family, but did not announce the information publicly. The prosecutors also visited the imprisoned Orlando Curicica and the Attorney General of the Republic, Raquel Dodge, referred to the MPRJ the testimony given by him to the prosecutors, whose content was also kept private, to maintain the secrecy of the investigation, which was a concern to all the authorities involved.

On 3 July 2019, the Civil Police and the Navy announced an operation to find the weapons that would have been used in the crime. The suspicion originated from the testimony of a boatman in the Quebra-Mar area, in Barra. According to him, a man, later identified as Márcio Montavano, a.k.a. Márcio Gordo - who would have taken the weapons from addresses linked to retired military police officer Ronnie Lessa, who is pointed out as the ringleader of the crime - hired him for a trip to the Tijucas Islands, to practice underwater fishing. According to the police, in addition to Márcio, Lessa's wife Elaine, her brother Bruno, and a man named Josinaldo were also involved. According to the boatman's statement, the contractor put a heavy cardboard box into the boat, inside of which were smaller boxes, and a suitcase. Then the man opened the suitcase, took out six rifles, and threw the weapons and the box overboard. Then he gave the boatman three hundred reais to pay for the transport, called a cab, and left. The police knew that this was a friend of Lessa's.

Also in July 2019, the minister and president of the Supreme Federal Court (STF), Dias Toffoli, suspended the investigation regarding the murder of Marielle. Toffoli's decision temporarily affected all inquiries in the country, on the grounds that they were founded on financial intelligence reports made with information obtained without judicial authorization. That is, they were information shared by the Council for Financial Activities Control (Coaf) and the Tax Authorities, without authorization from the Justice Department.

By September, it was known, according to a report by the Security and Intelligence Coordination of the Public Prosecutor's Office of the State of Rio de Janeiro, that Military Police reserve sergeant Ronnie Lessa, accused of the murder, was a militia leader in the west zone of Rio de Janeiro, owned a clandestine bingo parlor in Barra da Tijuca and planned, before his arrest, to expand his water distribution business to areas dominated by drug traffickers in the city. The report was the basis for a request accepted by the Justice of Rio de Janeiro to transfer Lessa to the federal prison system.

On 9 February 2020, the police killed, in a confrontation, the militiaman Adriano Magalhães da Nóbrega, known as Captain Adriano and the appointed head of a group of professional killers called Escritório do Crime, which brought together police officers and former police officers who committed homicides in exchange for money, and also head of a militia in Rio de Janeiro. He was a former captain of the Special Operations Battalion (Bope) of Rio de Janeiro's Military Police and was one of those indicted in Operation Untouchables. Authorities cited Adriano in the murder of Marielle Franco, but he was not included in the inquiry investigating her death. Although he was heard in the inquiry, he was not considered a suspect.

On 30 June,the delegate in charge of the investigation into Marielle's death, Daniel Rosa, put an end to the suspicion that hung over the militia organization called Escritório do Crime. The "Office" was already under investigation due to suspicion of having carried out many executions, and it was believed that the execution of the councilwoman could be one of them, due to the group's proximity to Ronnie Lessa. It still had not been proven that Lessa was part of the criminal organization. Even so, the investigation took this direction after the testimony of Orlando Curicica, who was arrested on suspicion of participating in Marielle's murder. According to Rosa, the members of the militia group did carry out an execution that night, but that of another person, Marcelo Diotti. The crime took place in a restaurant in Barra da Tijuca, and a detailed investigation, with conflicting timelines, removed the possibility that these men had participated in the murder of the councilwoman.

In mid-July 2020, after two years with no answers as to how the executioners of the councilwoman had access to ammunition restricted for use by the Federal Police, the prosecutor in charge of the case requested the closure of the case, which had been opened at the request of the Federal Public Prosecutor's Office. However, the prosecutor Eduardo Benones did not accept the closure and requested further investigation, arguing that the investigation was not only aimed at holding public agents accountable but that it was primarily intended to be a response by the Brazilian State to the many questions about a crime "whose character is notoriously transcendental". To this end, the Ministry requested an expert examination of the ammunition, to find out if it was an original load, and a request for an explanation from the manufacturer of the projectiles, who allegedly produced a volume larger than permitted by the Army.

In mid-December, the Civil Police and the Public Ministry found an important clue to solve the crime. According to the report, Eduardo Almeida Nunes de Siqueira, a resident of Muzema, a favela dominated by the militia, cloned a car of the same model that was used in the homicide. In addition, Siqueira was defended by the same lawyer as Ronnie Lessa, who is considered to be Marielle's executioner. He confessed that he cloned many vehicles, including a 2014 silver Cobalt, which was exactly the type of car used by the gunmen. Siqueira did not know how the car was used, but he saw a lot of similarities between what he cloned and what was used in the crime. The police were also following other lines of investigation, such as the confirmation that the order to kill Marielle came from the former firefighter, former councilman, and militiaman Cristiano Girão, aiming to take revenge on federal deputy Marcelo Freixo, since Girão was one of the names on the list of the militia CPI made by the congressman.

In July 2021, there were important changes in the crime investigation team. In the Civil Police, Edson Henrique Damasceno, without official explanation, became the head of the Homicide Precinct, which investigates all violent deaths in the state. Damasceno was the fourth in charge of the police investigation timeline. At the same time, the prosecutors Simone Sibilio and Letícia Emile left the task force of the Public Prosecutor's Office of Rio de Janeiro, which was also investigating the attack. They reported fear and dissatisfaction with "external interferences", but did not give details about these forces. In addition, the body of Adriano da Nóbrega was exhumed, and forensics found contradictions between the autopsy findings and the accounts of the military police officers who killed him in official action.

== Arrests and convictions ==
On 30 May 2018, police arrested Thiago Bruno Mendonça, known as "Thiago Macaco," who was accused of killing Carlos Alexandre Pereira Maria, "O Cabeça," a collaborator of Councilman Marcello Siciliano. Thiago Macaco is also quoted in the testimony of an ex-militiaman named as a key witness in the case. According to the source, Thiago is linked to Orlando de Curicica, head of the Boiúna militia, currently in prison. The two allegedly participated in planning the murder of the congresswoman, who was hindering the business of the paramilitary group in the West Zone. These businesses were also of interest to Siciliano, who denied the accusations. The witness also said that Thiago Macaco was responsible for cloning the silver Cobalt used by the killers to commit the crime. The agents had already served the temporary arrest of Rondinele de Jesus Da Silva, "Roni", on 19 May, for the same offense.

On 24 July 2018, police arrested former police officer Alan Nogueira, known as "Crazy Dog", and former firefighter Luís Cláudio Barbosa. Both were denounced by a whistleblower, who also implicated them in a double murder case. They were identified as members of the militia group Orlando Oliveira de Araújo, known as Orlando da Curicica, who operates in the city's West Zone. The double murder was allegedly committed at a farm owned by Orlando. A military police officer and an ex-military police officer, also members of the militia, according to police, were deceived and killed with shots to the head. Afterward, their bodies were burnt beyond recognition. The delegate said that he could not yet connect the two to the execution of the councilwoman and that the investigation was still confidential. The cited militia controls, besides Curicica, the regions of Taquara, Vargem Pequena, Vargem Grande, and Terreirão. The militia's activities include extortion of merchants and residents, such as charging fees for the sale of gas and mineral water, as well as control of slot machines.

The first arrest warrants were issued on 13 December 2018. Civil police officers from the homicide division executed fifteen warrants in the state of Rio de Janeiro and outside of it, all directed against militiamen. In Angra dos Reis, Morro da Constância, during the execution of one of these warrants, the team was cornered by criminals. According to official information, the agents were under strong threat, in a place of vulnerability and extreme risk, being rescued by civil and military police action. The warrants were part of an investigation linked to the murder of Marielle but were conducted in parallel. At the time, nine months had elapsed since the crime.

On 22 January 2019, police arrested Military Police Major Ronald Paulo Alves Pereira on suspicion of involvement in the murder. In addition, he was to stand trial in the case of the Chacina da Via Show, in which four young men were executed by military police officers. The case had been suspended and reopened. According to official information, he was being investigated based on suspicion of being a member of the so-called "Escritório do Crime" (Office of Crime). He was also accused of running illegal businesses, such as land grabbing and loan sharking.

On 12 March 2019, as part of "Operation Lume", police arrested two military police officers suspected of participating in the murder. The preventive arrest warrants were executed against retired Military Police Sergeant Ronnie Lessa, 48, and Élcio Vieira de Queiroz, who had already been expelled from the Military Police of Rio de Janeiro. According to the accusation made by the Public Ministry, which worked together with the police, Lessa pulled the trigger for the 13 shots that killed Marielle and her driver Anderson, while Queiroz was the driver of the vehicle used in the crime. Also according to the Public Ministry, the crime was meticulously planned three months in advance. At the home of a friend of Ronnie Lessa, 117 disassembled M-16 rifles were found, the friend said he had kept the rifles without knowing what they were and the seizure of these rifles became the largest weapons seizure in the history of Rio de Janeiro.

On 31 May, police arrested Rafael Carvalho Guimarães and Eduardo Almeida Nunes, who were being investigated for the possible cloning of the Cobalt car used in the murder of the councilwoman. The arrests were part of Operation Entourage, which targeted the militia of Orlando Curicica, which dominated regions of the West Zone of Rio de Janeiro. According to the police, their function in Curicica's organization was to clone cars so that the gang could move around and commit crimes without attracting attention. In addition, military police officer Rodrigo Jorge Ferreira, known as Ferreirinha, was arrested and accused of obstructing investigations into the crime. The operation involved 300 police officers and eight people were arrested. The hypothesis that Curicica was one of the principal of the crime has grown stronger. The crimes committed by the organization, which is very well structured, were mostly carried out with the use of violence, including the execution of witnesses and assassination attempts against authorities in charge of investigations.

In July 2020, after the arrest of Carlos Augusto de Moraes Afonso, a businessman linked to the Free Brazil Movement, known on the Internet as Luciano Ayan, was discovered to be responsible for spreading a false news story that accused Marielle Franco of having had a relationship with drug dealer "Marcinho VP", as well as having ties to the Comando Vermelho criminal faction.

In October, former police officer Elcio Vieira de Queiroz was sentenced to five years in prison and payment of a fine for carrying ammunition and possession of firearms, ammunition, and magazines on the day he was arrested, on 12 March 2019. On that date, civil police officers and two prosecutors went to Queiroz's house to serve an arrest warrant, for his suspected involvement in the death of the councilwoman and her driver, and another search and seizure order, to collect possible evidence of the crime. During the search they found eight 5.56 mm caliber rifle ammunition in his car and, in his house, they found a Glock .380 caliber pistol with five magazines and 46 ammunition, as well as a Taurus .40 caliber pistol with three magazines and 72 ammunition. The sentence would have been served in an open regime if Queiroz had not already been in preventive custody for the murders, in the Federal Penitentiary of Porto Velho. The sentence was issued on 11 September by Judge André Felipe Veras de Oliveira, of the 32nd Criminal Court in Rio de Janeiro.

On 7 August 2022, Ronnie Lessa, who was being held in preventive detention at the Campo Grande Maximum Security Federal Penitentiary, was sentenced to five years in prison for attempted international arms trafficking. According to the sentence, he should begin serving his sentence in a closed regime, and preventive detention motivated by the homicide would be maintained. The justification for the sentence was the quantity and purpose of the equipment seized. Furthermore, according to the text of the sentence, the imported material was intended to make it difficult to identify the origin of shots fired from AR-15 rifles, commonly used by criminal organizations that control vast territories in the city of Rio de Janeiro, where they terrorize, injure and kill residents and public security agents indiscriminately. For example, this equipment serves to reduce the glare caused by rifle shots, generally used by professional shooters, in order to attract less attention when they shoot. In February 2023, the Military Police of Rio de Janeiro confirmed the expulsion of Ronnie Lessa from the corporation.

On 7 December 2023, Luiz Paulo de Lemos Júnior, known as "Chupeta", was arrested for being identified by investigators as the driver of Ronnie Lessa, defendant in the murder of councilwoman Marielle Franco and member of the "Escritorio do Crime" faction. Later on 28 February 2024, the Federal Police and the Special Task Force for the Repression of Organized Crime (Gaeco), of the Public Prosecutor's Office of Rio de Janeiro (MPRJ), arrested the owner of a scrapyard Edilson Barbosa dos Santos, known as "Orelha", accused of destroying the silver GM Cobalt car in a scrapyard in Morro da Pedreira, in the North Zone of Rio. The car was reportedly the one used on the day of the crime.

On 24 March 2024, police arrested federal lawmaker João Francisco Inácio Brazão and his brother Domingos Brazão, an auditor for Rio de Janeiro's Court of Accounts, on suspicion of ordering Franco's killing. Former Rio's Police Chief Rivaldo Barbosa, who was appointed to the office on the eve of Franco's assassination by then-Rio's security interventor Walter Braga Netto in the 2018 federal intervention in Rio de Janeiro (despite repeated objections from Rio's police intelligence) and on that post investigated Franco's assassination himself, was also arrested on the grounds of obstruction of justice and corruption, all of them were taken to the Federal Penitentiary of Brasilia, known as "Papuda", to serve their sentences. On 27 March, the Brazão brothers were transferred to other prisons, Chiquinho was taken to Campo Grande and Domingos to Porto Velho, while delegate Rivaldo Barbosa remains imprisoned in the capital of Brasília. The choice of penitentiaries was made by the Ministry of Justice.

Also in March 2024, Giniton Lages, another Rio Police Chief who also investigated Franco's assassination, was targeted by a search warrant for his house accused of obstruction of justice for working as an informant to the masterminds of Franco's assassination. Lages reportedly worked to (and eventually did) gain confidence from Franco's family to get privileged information about her inner circle and block attempts to reach the actual crime's masterminds, including forcing a testimony by a convicted cop in which he falsely admits another criminal was the assassination's mastermind. Lages also wrote a book about the investigation's behind-the-scenes titled Who Ordered Marielle's Killing? whose purpose was, according to Lages, "to help the society better prepare to deal with similar cases in the future."

On 9 May, the Attorney General's Office (PGR) indicted brothers Domingos and Chiquinho Brazão and police chief Rivaldo Barbosa for ordering the murder of councilwoman Marielle Franco. On the afternoon of the same day, Minister Alexandre de Moraes of the Federal Supreme Court (STF) lifted the confidentiality of the case. Later, on 28 May, the Rio de Janeiro courts convicted former police officer Rodrigo Ferreira, known as "Ferreirinha", and lawyer Camila Nogueira for obstructing the investigation into the murder of city councilwoman Marielle Franco and driver Anderson Gomes. The two were sentenced to 4 years and 6 months in prison. Although they were authorized to begin serving their sentences in a semi-open regime, the judge ordered that the sentence be served in a closed regime.

On 30 September, Edilson Barbosa dos Santos, a chop shop owner was the first defendant of the case to be convicted. He was sentenced to five years in prison over obstruction of justice for getting a car used in the shooting dismantled.

On 31 October 2024, a court sentenced Ronnie Lessa and Élcio Vieira de Queiroz to 59 and 78 years in prison, respectively, for Franco's assassination. On 25 February 2026, the Supreme Federal Court convicted the five defendants for Franco's assassination and sentenced both Brazão brothers to 76 years' imprisonment.

=== Summary table ===
The trial of the Brazão brothers, Rivaldo Barbosa, Ronald Alves, and Robson Calixto took place between 24–25 February 2026 before the First Panel of the Supreme Federal Court. The justices presiding over the case voted in the following order:

- Alexandre de Moraes (rapporteur)
- Cármen Lúcia
- Cristiano Zanin
- Flávio Dino (president of the First Panel)

Defendants	Criminal charges					Sentence
Defendants	Double aggravated homicide (Note: Murder with three aggravating circumstances of Marielle Franco and Anderson Gomes)	Attempted aggravated homicide (Note: Attempted murder of Fernanda Chaves.)	Criminal organization	Obstruction of justice	Passive corruption	Sentence
Domingos Brazão	Guilty; 4–0	Guilty; 4–0	Guilty; 4–0	—N/a	—N/a	76 years, 3 months
João Francisco Brazão	Guilty; 4–0	Guilty; 4–0	Guilty; 4–0	—N/a	—N/a	76 years, 3 months
Ronald Alves	Guilty; 4–0	Guilty; 4–0	—N/a	—N/a	—N/a	56 years
Rivaldo Barbosa	Not Guilty; 0–4	Not Guilty; 0–4	—N/a	Guilty; 4–0	Guilty; 4–0	18 years
Robson Calixto	—N/a	—N/a	Guilty; 4–0	—N/a	—N/a	9 years

== Impact ==
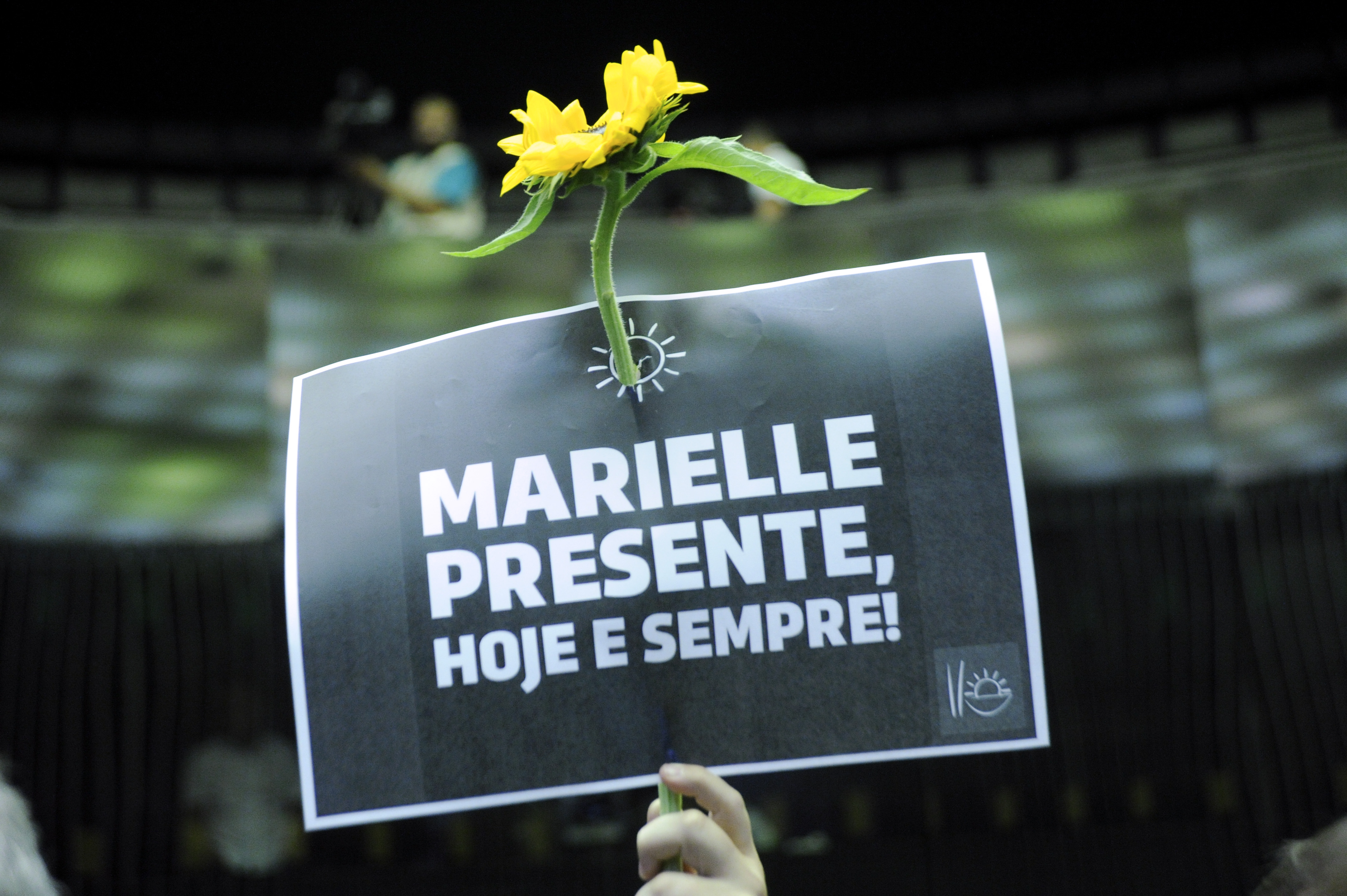
A protester holding a sign to honor Marielle at a solemn session in the Chamber of Deputies on 15 March 2018

Roberto Romano, philosopher, and professor of Ethics at Unicamp, said that the crime was an indication of the fragility of democratic institutions in Brazil, warning about a supposed threat of the return of the military dictatorship, given the closeness between the democratic state and the state of exception in the country. He also compared the case to the murder of the American missionary Dorothy Stang in 2005, in Pará, which would reveal the gaps in the advances in the promotion of human rights in Brazil. The philosopher believed that the episode should promote a change in the treatment of the security crisis, with medium and long term measures, such as the improvement of education and policies to reduce social inequality in the country, which he did not believe, given the federal government's handling of the case.

All the presidential candidates quickly expressed their opinions, regrets and condolences to the families of the victims, with the exception of Jair Bolsonaro, that he was unable to speak because of food poisoning, according to the deputy's press agent, but the same press agent also informed that his opinion would be seen as "polemic", and, therefore, the politician would prefer not to speak. On 20 March, he publicly declared that he would maintain his silence, criticizing the selective silence of other politicians and calling attention to the lack of public safety in Rio.

The Attorney General of the Republic, Raquel Dodge, said that her office was committed to the investigation of the assassination, by monitoring the investigations and evaluating the federalization of the case. For her, attacks against political leaders and corruption were examples of attacks on democracy and the level of impunity was still high in the country. Dodge was in Rio de Janeiro on 15 March, where she attended a meeting to monitor the investigation work of the crime.

The National President of the Brazilian Bar Association, Claudio Lamachia, issued a note on 15 March, in which he denounced the assassination as a crime against society as a whole and a direct offense to the values of the democratic rule of law. He also pointed out that the Federal Council of the Bar Association was following the case and hoped for agility in the investigation and exemplary punishment for the groups involved.

The Portuguese Parliament unanimously approved a vote of regret for the death of Franco, expressing "the strongest condemnation of the violence and political and hate crimes that increase every day in Brazil". The vote was announced on the day of the crime by the leader of the Left Bloc, Catarina Martins, during the fortnightly debate with the prime minister, and was endorsed by the president of the Parliament, Ferro Rodrigues, and by the deputy André Silva, in a text that highlighted the political militancy of the councilwoman in favor of minorities and for denouncing police violence.

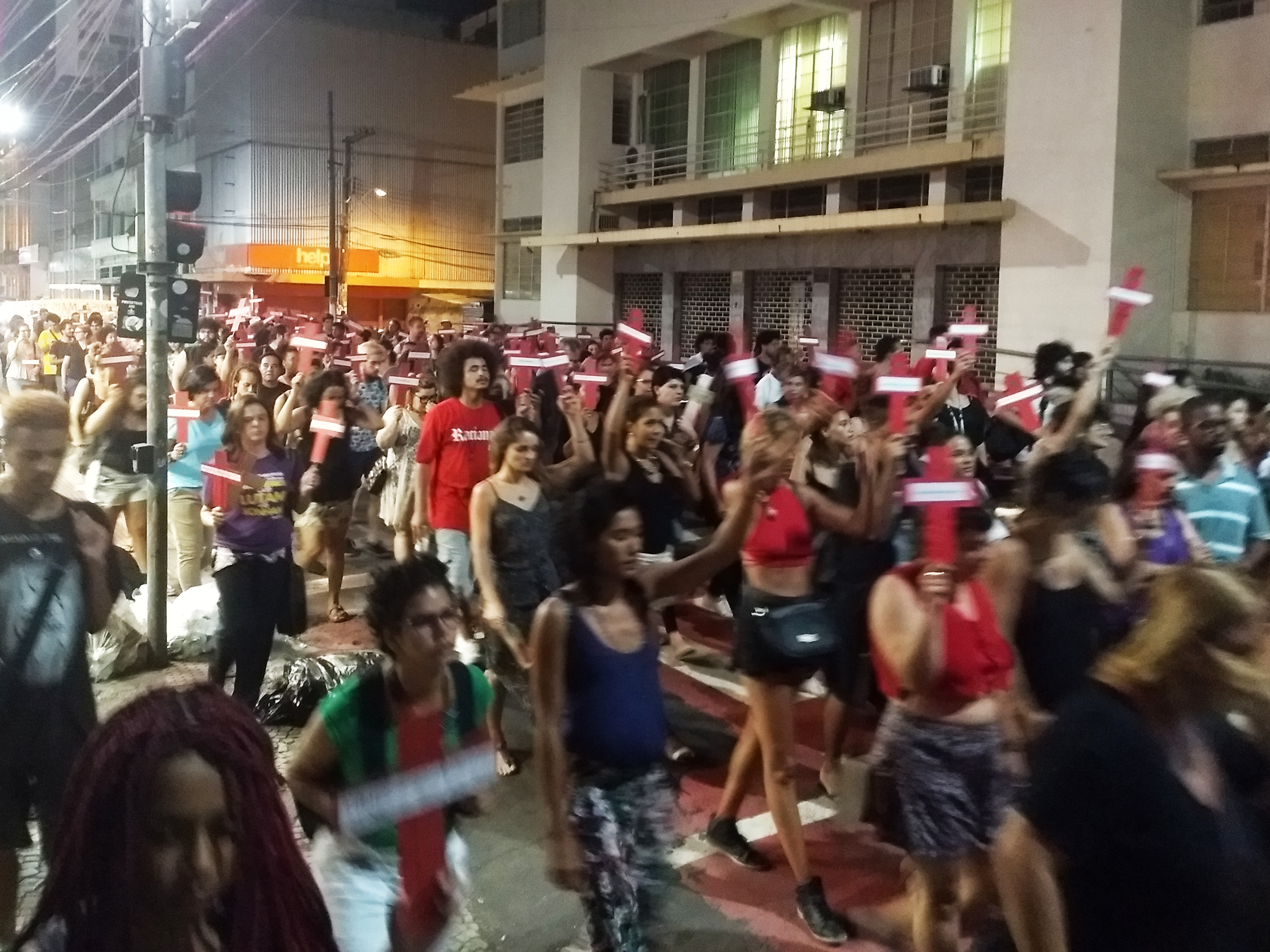
March held in Vitória in honor of Marielle Franco and Anderson Pedro Gomes

Judge Marília Castro Neves, from the Court of Justice of Rio de Janeiro, presented another version of the crime. In a message written on Facebook, the judge said that Marielle was not only a militant, but that she was engaged with criminals, had been elected by the Red Command and had failed to comply with campaign agendas, consequently being murdered for not paying debts. The judge's message generated protests and Juliano Medeiros, national president of PSOL, announced that he would demand the magistrate's condemnation at the National Justice Council.

There were also demonstrations on social networks, with Twitter as the main platform for discussion. According to the Getulio Vargas Foundation, there were 567,000 mentions of the politician's name. The peak occurred about two hours after the murder, around 11:50 pm, with 594 "tweets" per minute. The research pointed out that 88 percent of them were messages of mourning and highlighting Marielle's trajectory, with a high suspicion that the crime was an execution and that it was promoted by military police officers. The users remembered that the councilwoman, on the eve of her death, accused the Military Police of the murder of a teenager and criticized the Military Police in Acari, a neighborhood in Rio's North Zone. At the same time, a smaller portion of web users made demonstrations against the left and defended tougher security measures, also criticizing the political exploitation of the case by the PSOL.

The ideological warfare on social networks led a law firm, EJS Advogadas, to track down the slanderous content, having received more than two thousand complaints by e-mail by 19 March. The goal announced was to send all the messages, with their authors identified, to an investigation at the Civil Police's Department for Repression of Computer Crimes or to a public retraction in court. Tarcísio Motta, Marielle's colleague in the Chamber, said it was necessary to hold accountable those who were propagating hate speech and reproducing or creating false news that undermined the honor of the councilwoman. Marielle's sister stated that the spreaders of false information would be held accountable, asking for more respect for the family, their grief, and the image of her late sister. In the following weeks, the family filed a lawsuit due to the excess of derogatory messages. In response, the court ordered the removal of posts containing slanderous or false content about Franco on Facebook and YouTube. In addition, it demanded that Facebook prevent the publication of new posts offensive to Marielle and to inform her whether the profiles of Luciano Ayan, Luciano Henrique Ayan and Movimento Brasil Livre sponsored the reported posts.

Another manifestation was that of the director José Padilha, who said that the violence in Rio de Janeiro was a recurrent process, in which an enormous number of people were silently murdered in the last twenty years. He also said that the police were unprepared, corrupt, and extremely violent, and that there was no social assistance in poor communities, all of which led to the high number of deaths. Padilha cited the current ideological war, which has led people to adhere to their own cognitive bias, instead of paying attention to more tangible and general problems. Still according to the filmmaker, the current condition could not be credited only to poverty, since, as he said, there are countries poorer than Brazil with lower violence rates, and the police in Rio de Janeiro kill forty times more than the police in the United States as a whole. He concluded by reminding that the problem only received progressive media attention, bringing to light the underlying situation, when a serious case happened, like the death of the councilwoman, the Candelária and Vigário Geral massacres.

On 13 April, thirty days after the crime, Amnesty International released a statement demanding that the Brazilian authorities speed up their investigations, which until then had not indicated any suspects. The entity asked for priority in the case, because, according to it, every day that the crime remains unsolved, the threats against human rights defenders in Brazil increase. Thus, the text of the statement called for "an immediate, thorough, impartial and independent investigation, which not only identifies the shooters, but also the intellectual authors of the crime". Renata Neder, research coordinator at Amnesty International, said the federal and Rio de Janeiro states owed a response commensurate with the gravity of the murder.

On 14 March 2021, there was a celebration to remember the three years since the murder, with the unveiling of a plaque, in Cinelândia, in front of the City Hall of Rio de Janeiro, in the city center, in an initiative of the City Hall. The plaque is similar to the ones used to identify the city's streets and squares and bears the words "Vereadora Marielle Franco". There are also two phrases: "(1979-2018) Black woman, slum woman, LGBT and human rights defender"; "Brutally murdered on 14 March 2018 for fighting for a more just society." And a black banner was also extended in front of Rio de Janeiro City Hall, which contained a question, "Who ordered Marielle to be killed?" Many authorities were present. Mayor Eduardo Paes stressed that no one should be murdered because of their ideology, their worldview. The councilwoman's mother, Marinete Silva, said that the plaque did not reduce the family's pain, but that it was a symbol of hope and activism, keeping Marielle alive. Marinete added that she remained believing in the solution of the case and trusted the investigations conducted by the State Public Ministry.

== Controversies ==
=== Judicial rebuke of Rede Globo ===
In November 2018, the homicide division of the Civil Police and the Public Prosecutor's Office of Rio de Janeiro filed a lawsuit demanding that Rede Globo be prohibited from broadcasting any information from the police investigation into the murders of Franco and her driver. Magistrate Gustavo Gomes Kalil, head of the Fourth Criminal Court of Rio de Janeiro, accepted the request, ruling that Rede Globo leaked the contents of the case file in a "prejudicial" manner, exposing data from the investigations and witnesses. However, the data so far disclosed by Rede Globo was reported without exposing personal information, with some being presented anonymously. Globo considered that the judicial decision was excessive and that it seriously hurt the freedom of the press.

The Brazilian Association of Investigative Journalism (Abraji) released a note:

Abraji considers that the judge's decision violates the right of Brazilians to the free circulation of information of public interest. The imposition of censorship is an affront to the Constitution. The freedom of the press, fundamental to democracy, should be protected by all instances of the Judiciary, but it is often ignored by judges who, months or years later, are disallowed by higher courts. In the meantime, the citizens' right to be informed is suspended, which generates irreparable damage to society. The case in question is an example of this absurd practice, which needs to end. It is up to the Judiciary to preserve constitutional rights, not to attack them.

=== Lack of journalistic questioning ===
Writing for the Analysis & Opinion column at Jornal Já, journalist, former executive editor of Exame magazine, editor and director of Gazeta Mercantil, and editor-in-chief of Jornal da Globo, José Antônio Severo, criticized the fact that the case was not questioned by the press until March 2020:

It was necessary for FGV and UnB professor Nelson Barbosa to come down from his chair and put his finger on the wound with the big question: why was Marielle Franco killed?

The day after the column by former Finance and Planning Minister of President Dilma Rousseff in Folha de S.Paulo, it seems that the media woke up and on Saturday's pages dotted with references to the unexplained motives for the crime.

An essential question came in, which until that day was not even mentioned in the analyses and narratives about the assassination, which circulated all over the world.

With the judicialization of the case, to bring the accused, Ronnie Lessa and Élcio Queiroz, to the jury court, it was necessary to introduce this question: why kill the woman?

The reason given in the record is 'of hate crime'.

Certainly in the times of the great police reporters of the past, such as the late Pena Branca (Otávio Ribeiro), Vanderlei Soares or the still active Percival de Souza, in his days at Jornal da Tarde, this issue would have already been raised in the investigative journalism pages.

In addition, the Association of Petrobras Engineers (AEPET) denounced the omission of the Marielle Franco Institute in relation to the investigations targeting the Army's federal servicemen.

=== Mention about Jair Bolsonaro by the doorman of Vivendas da Barra ===
According to an exclusive report on 29 October 2019, broadcast by Jornal Nacional, which had access to details of the case, the name of the President of the Republic was mentioned in a statement made by the doorman of the Vivendas da Barra Condominium, where Jair Bolsonaro and Ronnie Lessa, one of the main suspects of having murdered Marielle Franco and Anderson Gomes, live.

According to the doorman, the other suspect in the crime, Élcio de Queiroz, who would be the driver of the car used in the crime, entered the condominium on 14 March 2018, hours before the murder, claiming that he was going to house number 58, which belongs to Bolsonaro. With that, the doorman would have contacted the villa, pondering about allowing Queiroz to enter the condo. According to the doorman, the authorization was given by someone inside the house, whom he called "Mr. Jair".

After entering the condominium, the vehicle would have gone to house number 66, which belongs to Ronnie Lessa, who would be the main suspect in the shooting, according to the Public Prosecutor's Office, and not to Bolsonaro's house. The doorman then called a second time to house number 58 and a person who answered the intercom confirmed that the car would go to house number 66.

After the repercussion, the second son of Jair Bolsonaro, Carlos, went to the administration of the condominium where he obtained authorization to access the recordings of the calls from the concierge. Soon after, Carlos Bolsonaro published in his social networks the audios of the moment when the doorman authorizes Élcio de Queiroz to enter; in the audio, the doorman calls house 66, from where he receives authorization from Ronnie Lessa to let Élcio de Queiroz enter the condominium. For having access to the audios from the condominium, the political opposition accused Carlos of invasion of privacy and interference.

On the same day that Carlos released the audio from the condo doorway showing Ronnie Lessa authorizing the entry of Élcio Queiroz, the Public Ministry of Rio de Janeiro held a press conference where he said that the doorman lied in his statement to the Civil Police and that the expert recordings are not compatible with the version given by the doorman. The Public Ministry also said that the investigation confirmed that the voice on the intercom was Ronnie Lessa's and not Jair Bolsonaro's, as the doorman claimed; and although the control spreadsheet written by the doorman shows Bolsonaro's house number (58), the intercom record shows a call to house number 66.

The following month, the doorman who had quoted Bolsonaro stated in a statement to the Federal Police that he had made a mistake in quoting the president. On 11 February 2020, a Civil Police expert concluded that the voice of the doorman who let Élcio Queiroz in is not the same as the voice of the doorman who quoted Bolsonaro in the statement; the report was signed by six experts who confirmed that there was no alteration in the recordings and confirmed that the voice that let Élcio in was Ronnie Lessa's.

Jornal Nacional searched the records of the Chamber of Deputies and found a contradiction in the doorman's statement. Jair Bolsonaro, then a congressman, was in Brasilia that day, as records of attendance at two votes in the plenary showed: at 2 pm and 8:30 pm. Therefore, he could not have been in Rio, which raised doubts about who answered the intercom at the President's house that day.

Shortly after the report, Bolsonaro, who was in Saudi Arabia on an official visit, did a Facebook live to demonstrate his indignation with the report. In it, he accused the Governor of Rio de Janeiro, Wilson Witzel, of having leaked confidential information to Globo, since the case was being kept secret.

"I'll say more, your governor Witzel.... It also says here in Veja (magazine) that you allegedly leaked this process, which is in secret from Justice, to Globo. You only got elected governor because you were always together with Flávio Bolsonaro, my son. When you got to the government, the first thing you did was to make an enemy of him".

— -Jair Bolsonaro, as reported by BBC Brazil

The President also accused the Rio Civil Police of having orchestrated a "farce" and said he believed that the doorman may have been led to sign something that did not correspond to his true statement. "Either the doorman lied, or they induced the doorman to commit the false testimony, or they wrote something that the doorman then signed below (without checking the content)," he said.

=== Confession of interference by the governor of Rio de Janeiro ===
On 4 May 2020, the governor of Rio de Janeiro, Wilson Witzel, admitted in an interview on the program Roda Viva, on TV Cultura, that he interfered in the Civil Police operations in relation to the suspects of the attack. Witzel stated that he asked Police Officer Giniton Lages to arrest, in March 2019, retired military police officer Ronnie Lessa and former military police officer Élcio de Queiroz, on charges of acting in the double homicide. These arrests, as the governor admitted, were recommended despite the fact that there is still no confirmation of the possible mastermind of the crime. Witzel explained that he did not have access to the investigation, but he used his experience as a federal judge and suggested the arrests when the police chief said that he already knew who the perpetrators were. The intention was to open a new phase of the investigation, with the purpose of discovering the mastermind. Witzel's confession came amid accusations against President Jair Bolsonaro of interference in the Federal Police.

=== Messages to Bolsonaro's former aide ===
In May 2023, the Federal Police launched Operation Venire to investigate suspicions of inserting false data into the Conecte SUS system in favor of Bolsonaro, and arrested Lieutenant Colonel Mauro Cid (Bolsonaro's former aide) and former Major Ailton Barros (former candidate for state deputy for the PL), among others under investigation. A discussion between the two was discovered in which Barros acted as an intermediary in favor of former councilman Marcello Siciliano. Siciliano, then investigated for participating in planning/ordering the murder, requested a meeting with the United States consul in Rio de Janeiro in exchange for the insertion of data.

== Bibliography ==
- Bruno Paes Manso (2020). A República das Milícias: Dos Esquadrões da Morte à Era Bolsonaro (in Portuguese). Editora Todavia. p. 304. ISBN 9786556920672.

== See also ==
- Brazilian militias

== Notes ==
Notes
