= Bruno Paes Manso =

Brazilian journalist and writer

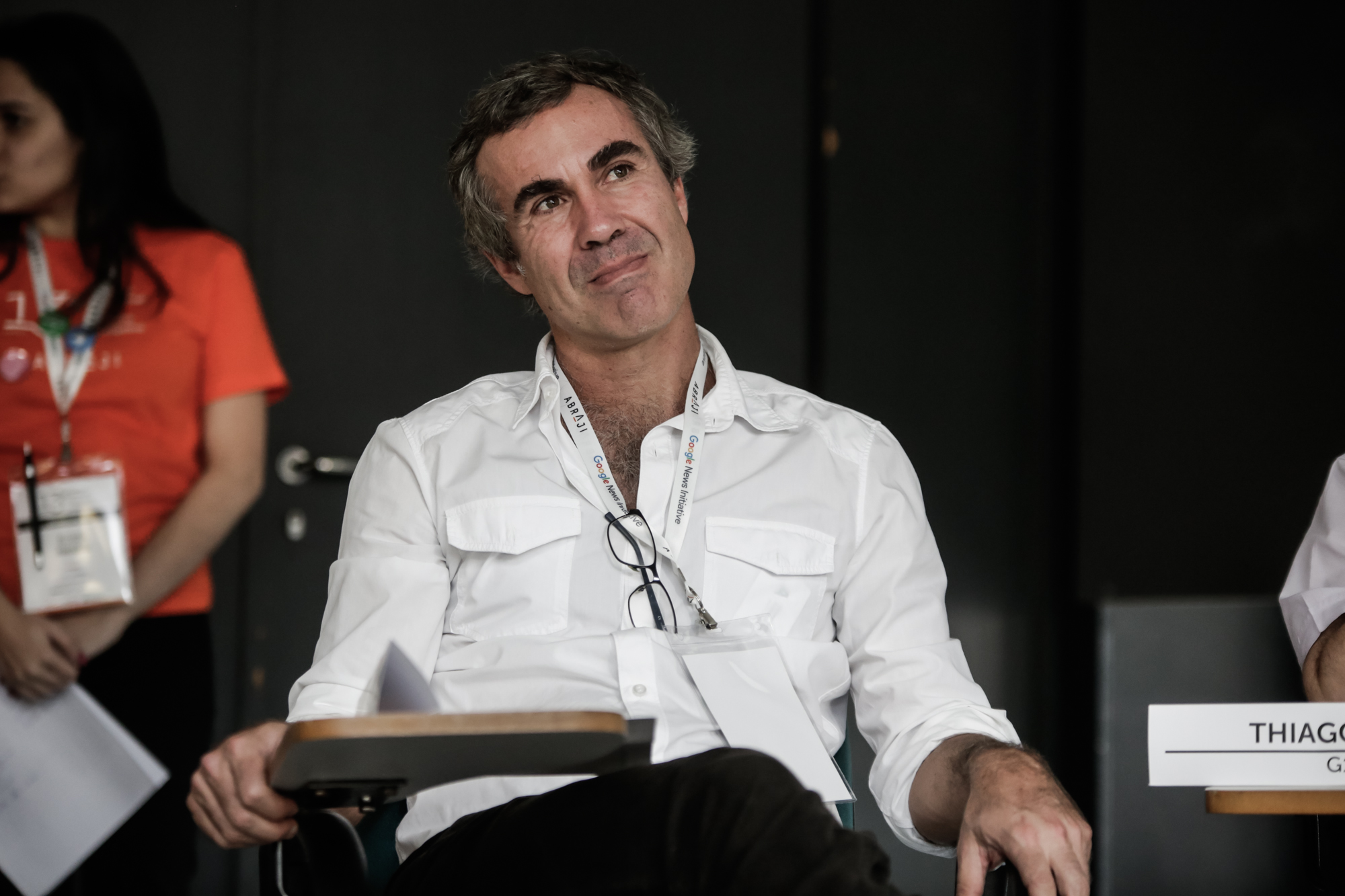
- Bruno Paes Manso at the University of São Paulo's Center for the Study of Violence
- Citizenship: Brazilian
- Education: University of São Paulo
- Occupations: writer journalist researcher
- Known for: Investigative journalism Criminology
- Awards: Jabuti Award (2021); Vladimir Herzog Award (2006)

Bruno Paes Manso is a Brazilian economist, journalist, researcher, and writer. His research focuses on studying urban violence in Brazil and the links between criminals and political power in the country.

== Biography ==
=== Education ===
Born in São Paulo, Bruno earned a degree in economics from the School of Economics, Business and Accounting of the University of São Paulo (FEA-USP) in 1995. At the same time, he studied journalism at the Pontifical Catholic University (PUC-SP), graduating in 1997.

Under the guidance of Lúcio Kowarick, he completed his master’s degree in political science at the University of São Paulo with a thesis titled Homicides and Murderers: Reflections on Contemporary Urban Life in São Paulo. In 2012, he defended his doctoral dissertation in political science, also at USP, titled The Rise and Fall of Homicides in São Paulo between 1960 and 2010: An Analysis of the Mechanisms of Homicidal Choice and Criminal Careers.

=== Career ===
His book A República das Milícias: Dos Esquadrões da Morte à Era Bolsonaro, published by Todavia publishing house in October 2020, was the result of research he conducted during his postdoctoral studies on the territorial disputes among Rio de Janeiro militias and their history of violence. The book recounts the author’s encounters with various militia members, investigating the activities of their organizations in Rio de Janeiro, the formation of death squads, the use of torture by the militias, and the murders of Tim Lopes and Marielle Franco, among other topics that seek to describe the landscape of militarized crime in Rio de Janeiro. The book garnered significant national attention and achieved high sales figures. In 2021, the book won the Jabuti Award in the “biography, documentary, and reporting” category. The work was also adapted into a podcast, featuring previously unpublished accounts, and is available for free on the Globoplay platform.

More recently, on September 21, 2023, Paes Manso also published the book A Fé e o Fuzil: Crime e Religião no Brasil do Século XXI, which seeks to link the activities of evangelical churches in Brazil with organized crime and urban violence, exploring how faith can serve as both a reason for distancing oneself from crime and a factor incorporated into criminal practices, and revealing the influence of religion on the internal structures and practices of organized crime in Brazil.

Other notable works include A Guerra: A Ascensão do PCC e o Mundo do Crime no Brasil, co-authored with researcher Camila Nunes Dias, on the activities of the criminal faction Primeiro Comando da Capital (PCC), its influence on crime throughout Brazil, and its disputes with rival factions, such as the Comando Vermelho (CV), as recounted by members of these organizations; and O Homem X: Uma Reportagem sobre a Alma do Assassino, which won the 2006 Vladimir Herzog Award in the “best investigative book” category, while working as a reporter for the newspaper O Estado de S. Paulo.

== Prizes ==
Year	Prize	Work	Category	Result	Ref.
2006	Vladimir Herzog Award	O Homem X: Uma Reportagem sobre a Alma do Assassino	Book-Report	Won	
2021	Jabuti Award	A República das Milícias: Dos Esquadrões da Morte à Era Bolsonaro	Biography, documentary, and reporting	Won	

== Books ==
- O Homem X: Uma Reportagem sobre a Alma do Assassino (Rio de Janeiro: Record, 2005)
- Mascarados: A Verdadeira História dos Adeptos da Tática Black Bloc (São Paulo: Geração Editorial, 2014) — co-authored with Esther Solano e Willian Novaes
- A Guerra: A Ascensão do PCC e o Mundo do Crime no Brasil (São Paulo: Todavia, 2018) — co-authored with Camila Nunes Dias
- A República das Milícias: Dos Esquadrões da Morte à Era Bolsonaro (São Paulo: Todavia, 2020)
- A Fé e o Fuzil: Crime e Religião no Brasil do Século XXI (São Paulo: Todavia, 2023)
- Viver é perigoso: Minha travessia no Rio (São Paulo: Editora Planeta, 2026) – co-authored with Marcelo Freixo
