= Vivendas da Barra Condominium =

Condominium in Rio de Janeiro

Vivendas da Barra Condominium Condomínio Vivendas da Barra
- Condominium
- Interactive map of Vivendas da Barra Condominium

Vivendas da Barra Condominium is a condominium located in the Barra da Tijuca neighborhood, in the western zone of the city of Rio de Janeiro. It is one of the oldest condominiums of the neighborhood, with its construction having begun in 1960. Its entrance is located at 3100 Lúcio Costa Avenue.

It was in one of the houses in the Vivendas da Barra Condominium where the 38th President of Brazil, Jair Messias Bolsonaro, lived for several years until he moved to the Palácio da Alvorada, after being elected president. His house is located on C Street and has 230 square meters. As of 2019, one of Jair Bolsonaro's sons, Carlos Bolsonaro, also resided in the condominium. In 2023, Jair Bolsonaro, while no longer President, started to renovate his house in the condominium.

On March 12, 2019, agents from the Homicide Division of the Civil Police of the State of Rio de Janeiro (PCERJ) and the Special Group for Combating Organized Crime (Gaeco) entered the Vivendas da Barra Condominium in order to arrest Ronnie Lessa, a retired military police officer accused of firing the 13 shots of 9-millimeter caliber that killed Rio de Janeiro councilwoman Marielle Franco and driver Anderson Gomes on March 14, 2018. Lessa's house in the condominium is located on the same street as Jair Bolsonaro's house, 70 steps away.
