= Mariel Mariscot =

Brazilian police officer (1940–1981)

Mariel Araújo Mariscot de Mattos

Personal details
- Born: June 2, 1940 Niterói, Guanabara, Brazil
- Died: October 8, 1981 (aged 41) Rio de Janeiro, Brazil
- Spouse: Elza de Castro (1970–1978)
- Profession: Police officer; actor

Mariel Araújo Mariscot de Mattos (June 2, 1940 – October 8, 1981) was a Brazilian police officer and actor. He worked in Rio de Janeiro in the 1960s, and was part of the Scuderie Detetive Le Cocq and of the Esquadrão da Morte (Death Squad).

== Biography ==
Born to Ariel and Maria Araújo Mariscot de Mattos, he became prominent as a police officer in the 1970s.

As a child, he moved with his family when they moved to Salvador, Bahia. When he was three years old, his father died of an incurable disease. For the next five years, his mother raised two children, Roberto and Mariel, on her own. In 1948, his mother married Wilson de Azevedo Brito, a third sergeant in the Brazilian Army, and the family returned to the city of Rio de Janeiro, settling in the Bangu neighborhood. Despite his sergeant's salary, Mariel's stepfather relied on the income of Mariel's mother, who sewed for others. The boys helped by hemming skirts for their mother’s sewing work. After some time, his stepfather was promoted to first sergeant and was able to provide a higher salary for the family. By then, Mariel was already a teenager. He studied at night, worked, and trained in swimming in the morning and water polo in the afternoon, both at Bangu Atlético Clube.

Mariel was known for his flamboyant style and relationships with women. He also appeared in the film Ali Babá e os Quarenta Ladrões.

He was shot and killed by a hired hitman on October 8, 1981, as he parked his car for a meeting with other illegal "jogo do bicho" lottery operators in downtown Rio de Janeiro.

Mariscot was portrayed by Jece Valadão in the 1979 biographical film Eu Matei Lúcio Flávio. He was also portrayed by Renato Góes in the 2025 biographical film O Homem de Ouro.

== See also ==
- Scuderie Detetive Le Cocq
