= José Álvaro Moisés =

Brazilian political scientist and writer (1945–2026)

José Álvaro Moisés (September 4, 1945 – February 13, 2026) was a Brazilian political scientist, academic, journalist and writer.

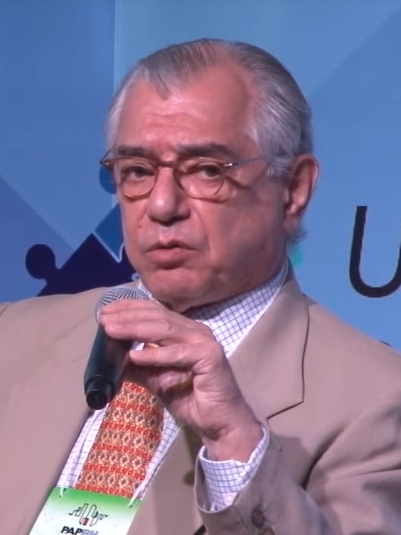
Moisés in 2016

== Life and career ==
Moisés was born September 4, 1945 in Campinas. He was a full professor of Political Science at the Faculty of Philosophy, Languages and Literature, and Human Sciences (FFLCH) of the University of São Paulo (USP) and director of the Center for Public Policy Research at USP. He was also a member of the Executive Committee of the International Political Science Association.

On February 13, 2026, Moisés drowned at Itamambuca Beach, in Ubatuba, on the north coast of São Paulo. According to the Maritime Fire Brigade, he was found unconscious on the strip of sand. He was pronounced dead at the scene.
