= Marielle Franco =

Brazilian politician and activist (1979–2018)

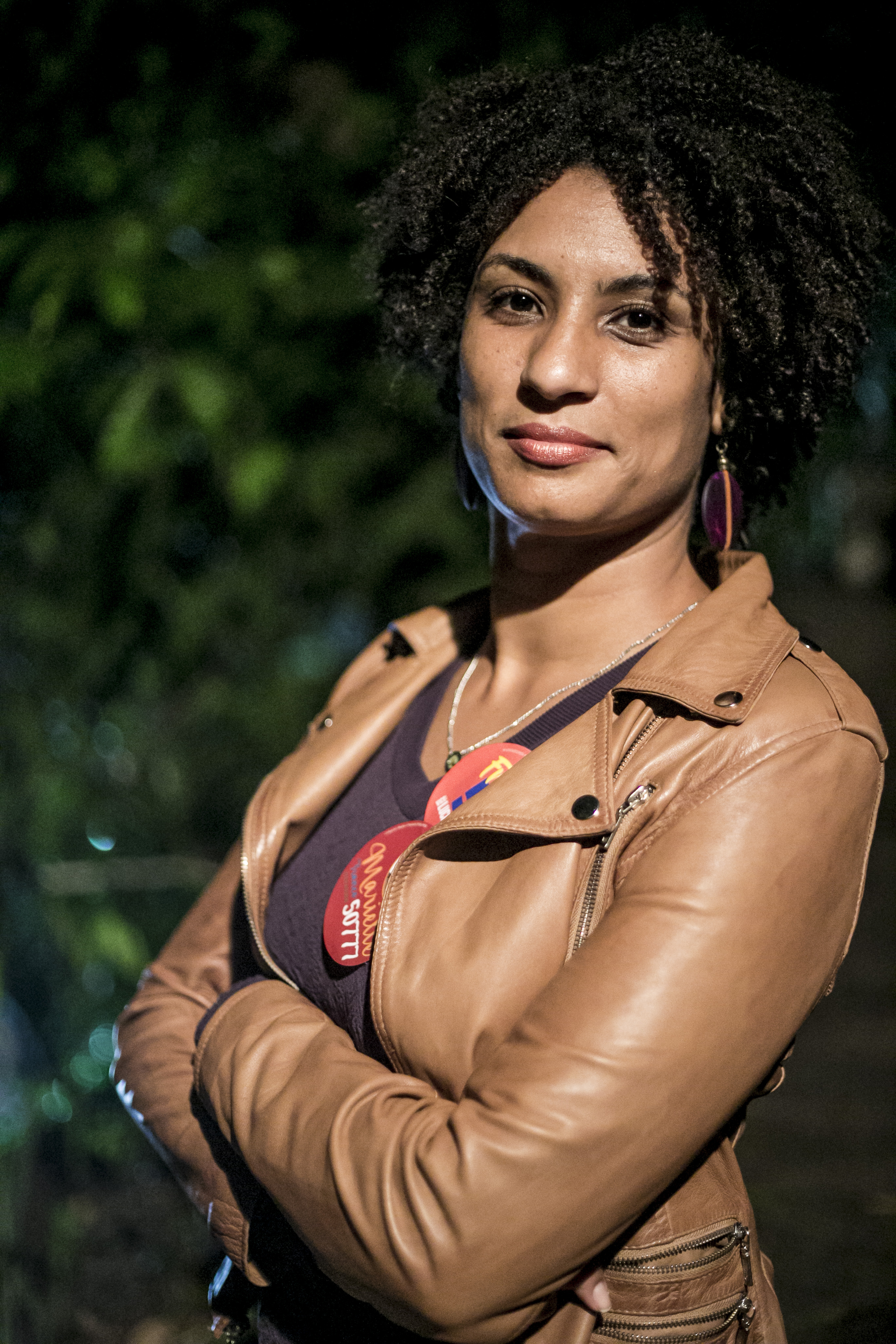
- Franco in 2016

Councillor of Rio de Janeiro
- In office 1 January 2017 – 14 March 2018
- Affiliation: PSOL
- Constituency: At-large

Personal details
- Born: Marielle Francisco da Silva; 27 July 1979 Rio de Janeiro, Brazil
- Died: 14 March 2018 (aged 38) Rio de Janeiro, Brazil
- Cause of death: Assassination by gunshot
- Party: PSOL (2007–2018)
- Domestic partner(s): Mônica Benício (2004–2018)
- Relations: Anielle Franco (sister)
- Children: 1
- Education: Pontifical Catholic University of Rio de Janeiro; Fluminense Federal University
- Occupation: Politician, sociologist

Marielle Franco (Portuguese pronunciation: [maɾiˈɛli ˈfɾɐ̃ku]; born Marielle Francisco da Silva, 27 July 1979 – 14 March 2018) was a Brazilian politician, sociologist, feminist, socialist and human rights activist. Franco served as a city councillor of the Municipal Chamber of Rio de Janeiro for the Socialism and Liberty Party (PSOL) from January 2017 until her assassination.

On 14 March 2018, while in a car after delivering a speech in the north of Rio de Janeiro, Franco and her driver were shot multiple times and killed by two former police officers travelling in another vehicle. Franco had been an outspoken critic of police brutality and extrajudicial killings, as well as the February 2018 federal intervention by Brazilian president Michel Temer in the state of Rio de Janeiro, which resulted in the deployment of the army in police operations. In March 2019, Ronnie Lessa and Élcio Vieira de Queiroz were arrested and charged with the murder of Marielle Franco and her driver. They confessed to the double homicide and were also convicted of the attempted murder of Fernanda Chaves, Franco's Press Secretary, who was also in the car at the time.

== Early life ==
Franco was raised in Maré, a slum in northern Rio de Janeiro, where she also resided for most of her life, and began to work to contribute to the household income in 1990 when she was 11 years old. She had a sister, Anielle.

Marielle gave birth to her first and only child in 1998 when she was 19 years old. Franco raised her daughter without the father's help and worked as a pre-school teacher on a minimum wage.

In 2004, Franco, who throughout her career fought for LGBTQ rights, started a romantic relationship with Mônica Benício. In 2017, the couple decided to move in together in the Tijuca neighborhood with Luyara, Marielle's daughter. Their wedding was scheduled for the end of 2018.

== Education ==
In 2000, she began her pre-university studies. Following the death of a friend from a stray bullet in 2000, Franco began working in human rights activism.

In 2002, she entered the Pontifical Catholic University of Rio de Janeiro on a scholarship and continued working and raising her daughter as she worked towards a degree in social sciences. She subsequently earned a master's degree in public administration from the Fluminense Federal University. Her master's thesis (titled "UPP: The Reduction of the Favela to Three Letters") concerns the law enforcement program to retake control of Rio's favelas from gangs.

== Political career ==
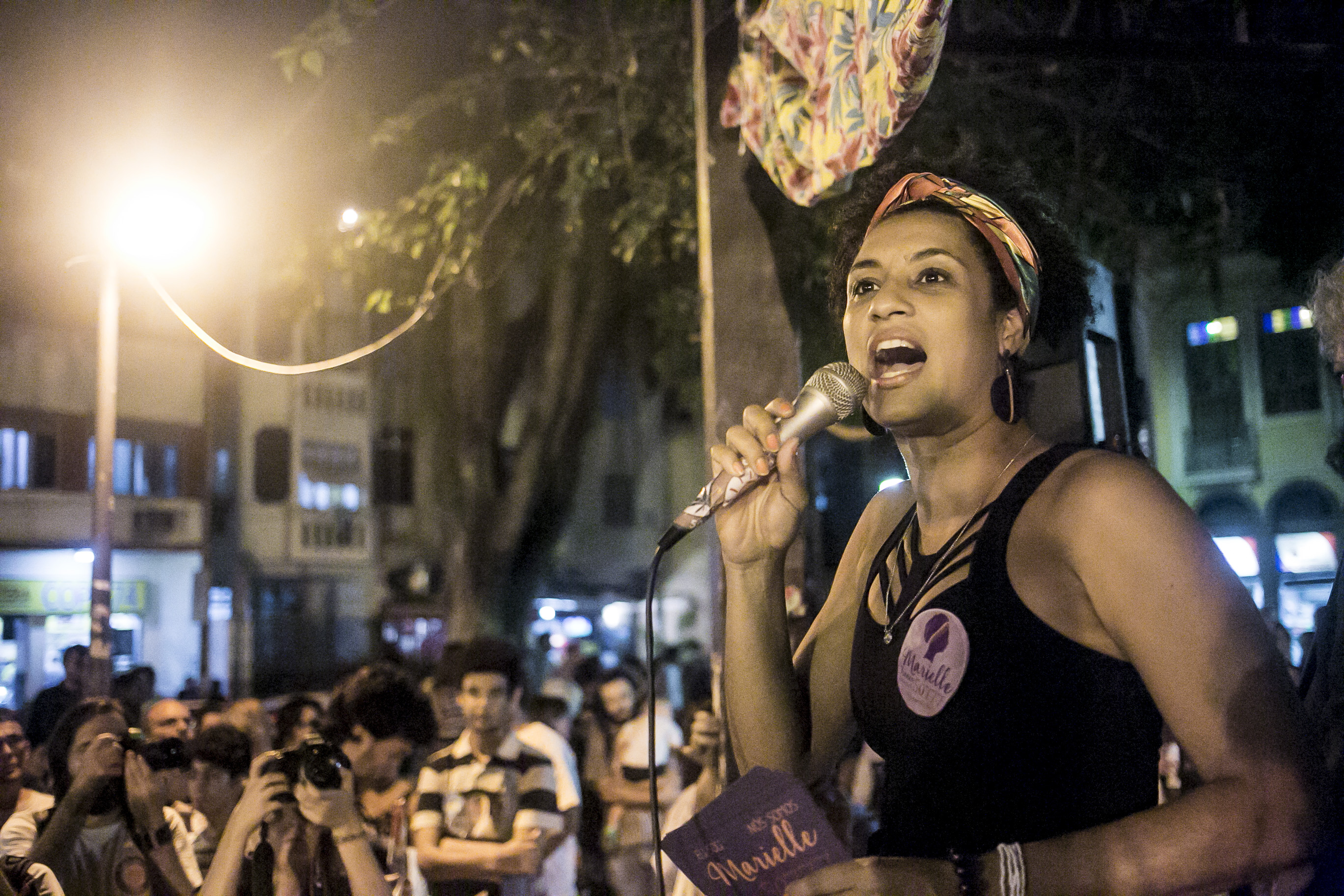
Marielle Franco in August 2016

Beginning in 2007, Franco worked as a consultant for the state representative Marcelo Freixo, and she coordinated the state legislature's Committee for the Defense of Human Rights and Citizenship. She also worked for civil society organizations, including the Brazil Foundation and the Maré Center for Solidarity Studies and Action.

In 2016, Franco ran for a seat on the Rio de Janeiro city council in the municipal elections. As a black woman and single mother from the favelas, Franco positioned herself as a representative and defender of poor black women and people from the favelas. With over 46,500 votes, Franco was one of the 51 representatives elected, receiving the fifth highest vote total out of more than 1,500 candidates.

As a city council member, Franco fought against violence against women, for reproductive rights, and for the rights of favela residents. She chaired the Women's Defense Commission and formed part of a four-person committee that monitored the federal intervention in Rio de Janeiro. Working with the Rio de Janeiro Lesbian Front, Franco presented a bill to create a day of lesbian visibility in Rio de Janeiro in August 2017, but the bill was defeated by a vote of 19–17.

== Final days and assassination ==
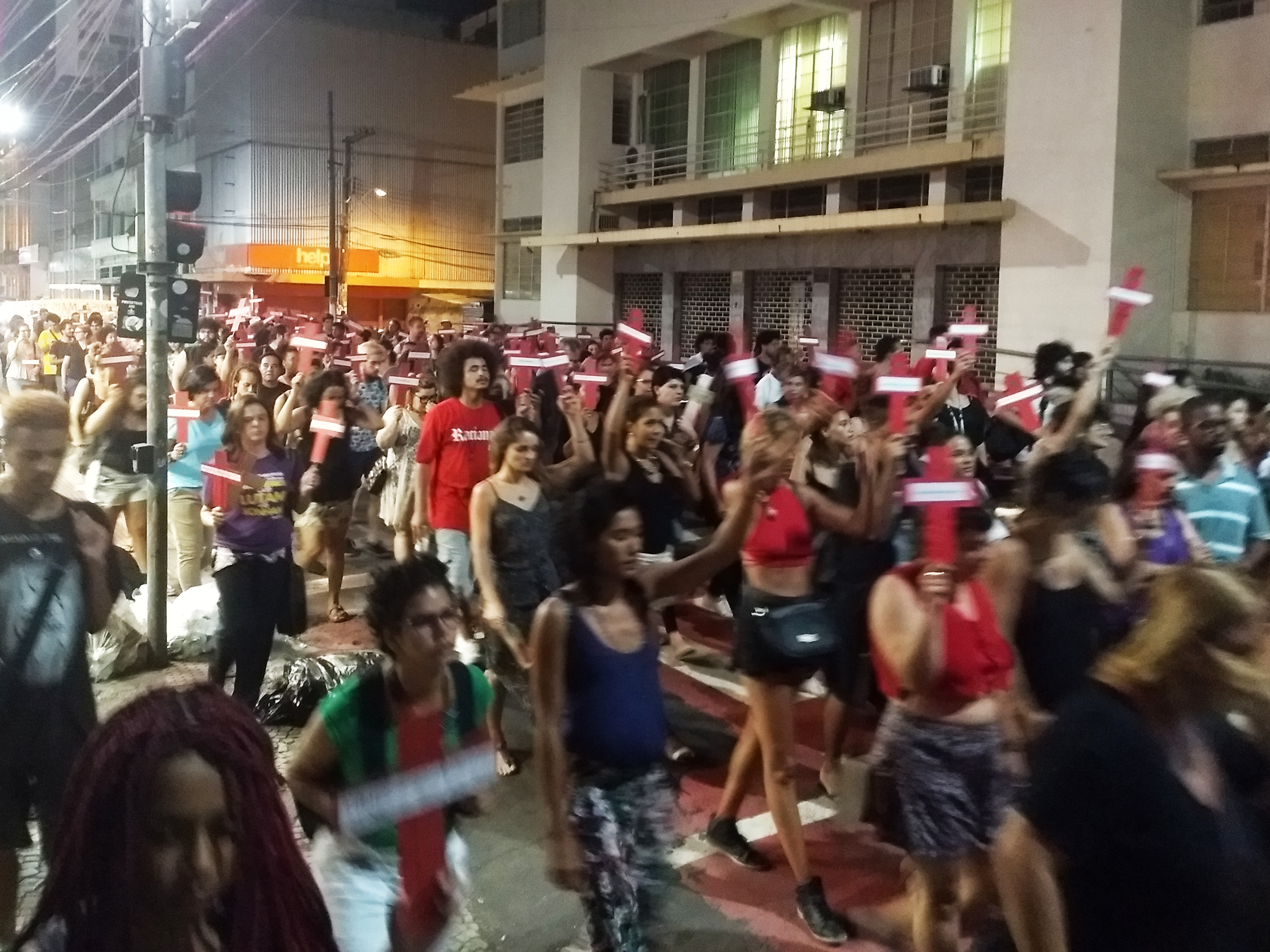
Protest held in Vitória to honor the memory of Marielle Franco and Anderson Pedro Gomes

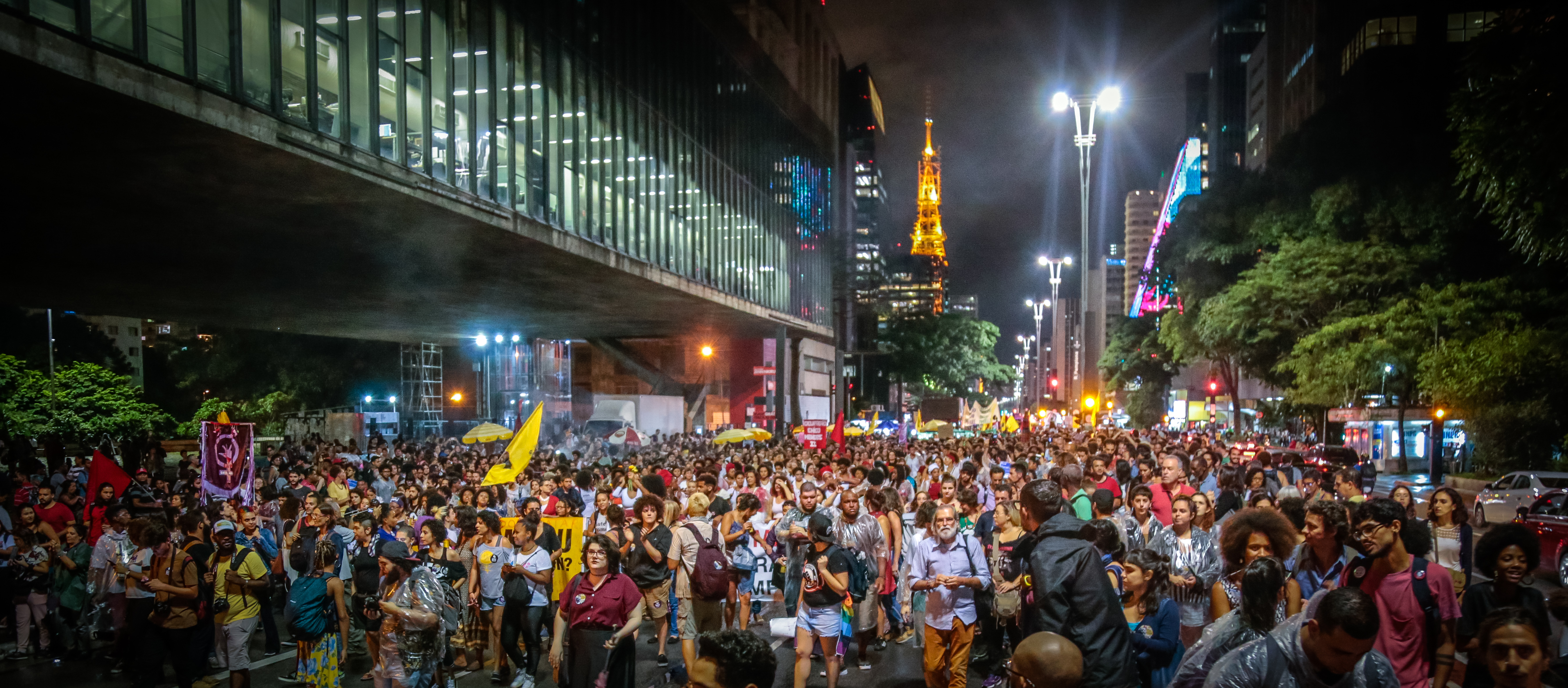
Protest in March 2019 calling for justice for Marielle against those who killed her

On 13 March 2018, Franco spoke out on Twitter against the police violence in Rio de Janeiro: "Another homicide of a young man that could be credited to the police. Matheus Melo was leaving church when he was killed. How many others will have to die for this war to end?"

The next day, Franco attended a round-table discussion titled "Young Black Women Moving [Power] Structures" (Portuguese: Jovens Negras Movendo Estruturas). Less than two hours after leaving the round-table, she and her driver, Anderson Pedro Gomes, were fatally shot by two men who were driving another car. The men fired nine shots at them, four of which struck Franco – three in the head and one in the neck. Franco's press officer was next to her in the back seat and was injured, but survived.

Marcelo Freixo, a Rio de Janeiro legislative assembly member from PSOL who came to the scene shortly after hearing of her killing, determined that the bullets had been directed at her in a clear execution. According to the Rio de Janeiro police, the direction of the nine shots supports the hypothesis that Franco was assassinated. The bullets that killed Franco are from a batch bought by the federal police in Brasília in 2006; Minister of Public Security Raul Jungmann later said that they were stolen from a post office storage facility in Paraíba, but the ministry subsequently retracted this explanation after the Post Office publicly denied it.

In January 2019, police arrested Ronald Paulo Alves Pereira and issued a warrant for Adriano Magalhães da Nóbrega, both suspects in Franco's assassination. Each suspect received honors from president Jair Bolsonaro's son Flávio Bolsonaro in the early 2000s. Nóbrega's wife and mother were still being employed in Flávio Bolsonaro's office in 2018.

In March 2019, police arrested two suspects, former members of the military police allegedly tied to a vigilante militia, for the murder. Prior to their arrest, both suspects had pictures taken with former President Jair Bolsonaro, and one was his neighbor at a luxury apartment complex in Rio. In November 2019, following leaked reports that President Bolsonaro had been in touch with one of the main suspects of the shooting, a number of Brazilian media outlets reported that police were investigating possible ties of his second son, Carlos, to the case. In 2020, then-governor of Rio de Janeiro Wilson Witzel admitted on television to having interfered in investigations of her death.

On 31 October 2024, a court sentenced former police officers Ronnie Lessa and Élcio Vieira de Queiroz to 59 and 78 years in prison, respectively, for Franco's assassination.

=== Reactions ===
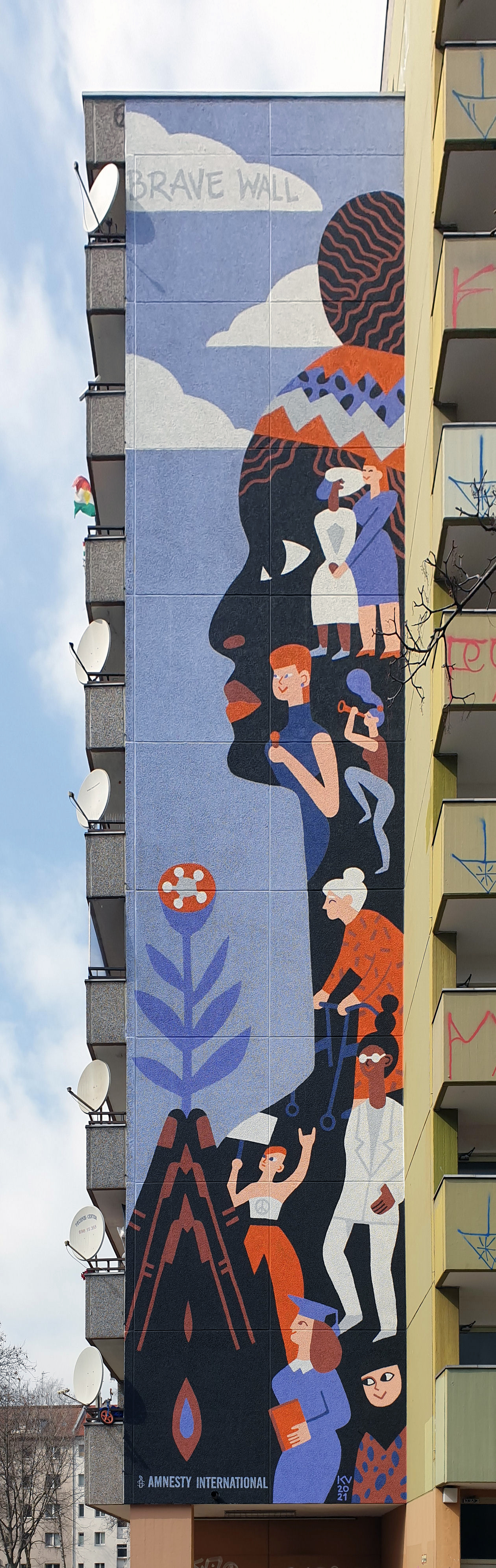
Mural "Marielle Franco" in Berlin-Kreuzberg

Thousands took to the streets in coordinated protests across Brazil, and both Amnesty International and Human Rights Watch condemned her killing. In the United States, Black feminist scholars published a statement honouring Marielle as "yet another martyr" for the Movement for Black Lives.

Journalist Glenn Greenwald, whose husband David Miranda was a fellow City Council member at the time of her assassination and was a close personal friend of Franco's, listed what he referred to as the "most important subjects to cover" regarding Franco's assassination stating:

Her relentless and brave activism against the most lawless police battalions, her opposition to military intervention, and, most threateningly of all, her growing power as a black, gay woman from the favela seeking not to join Brazil's power structure, but to subvert it.

The double murder of Marielle and her driver Anderson was the subject of condemnation across the political spectrum in Brazil. All presidential candidates in Brazil during the 2018 campaign condemned the crime, except for former President Jair Bolsonaro, who repeatedly declined to comment on the case; his campaign alleged that his views on the subject would be too controversial, despite his being the campaign that most focused on security issues prior to election day.

In 2022, President Lula announced the appointment of her sister, Anielle Franco, as Minister of Racial Equality.

On 25 February 2026, the Supreme Federal Court convicted five people, including politicians Chiquinho Brazão and his brother Domingos Brazão, for Franco's assassination and sentenced them to up to 76 years' imprisonment.

== Legacy ==
A digital art workshop was held in Nairobi, Kenya titled "Portraits of Marielle: Creating Bridges between Kenya and Brazil" with young Kenyan artists participating, and the artworks were displayed at the Maré Museum in Rio de Janeiro on 10 November 2018.

Amnesty International included Franco's name in its campaign for those who wrote for human rights and lost their lives, while an update was made and an online tribute listed Franco among over 400 human rights advocates for women by the Association for Women's Rights in Development.

A docu-series titled Marielle – O Documentário was released by Globoplay on 13 March 2020.

Version 19 of antiX, a Linux distribution based on Debian Stable, is named after Marielle Franco.

== Personal life ==
Franco was bisexual. In 2017, she moved to the Rio de Janeiro neighbourhood of Tijuca with her partner, Monica Tereza Benicio, and her (Franco's) 18-year-old daughter, Luyara Santos. Marielle and Monica had met during a trip with friends when they were 18 and 24 years old, respectively. They had been dating for 13 years, although the relationship had often been interrupted due to the non-acceptance of their families and friends. During the interruptions, Monica had relationships with other women and men and Marielle with other men. Franco and Benicio had been planning to marry in September 2018.

== See also ==
- List of assassinations § Brazil
