= Scuderie Detetive Le Cocq =

Brazilian paramilitary organization

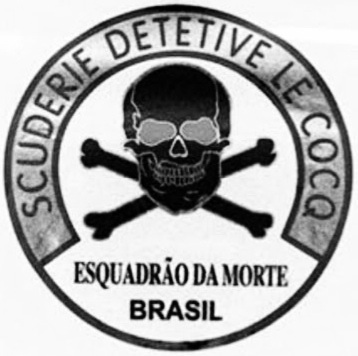
- Founded: 1965
- Country: Brazil
- Status: Extinguished by court decision in 2004

Scuderie Detetive Le Cocq or Esquadrão Le Cocq was a paramilitary organization created by police officers in Rio de Janeiro in 1965 and which operated mainly in the 1960s, 1970s and 1980s, being extinguished by court order in 2004. This organization killed at least 1,500 people in Espírito Santo and is considered the first extermination group in Rio de Janeiro and the most famous in Brazil. In 2015, police officers using the name of the organization, under the name Associação Filantrópica Scuderie Detetive Le Cocq, carried out a pamphlet campaign to encourage the use of the hotline.

== History ==
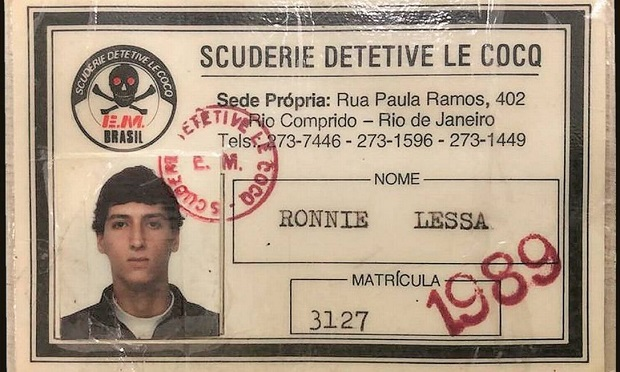
Ronnie Lessa (member of the Death Squad)

The Scuderie Le Cocq was created to avenge the death on duty of Milton Le Cocq, a famous police detective from the state of Rio de Janeiro (formerly the Federal District), a member of Getúlio Vargas' personal guard and cousin of Brigadier Eduardo Gomes. He was allegedly killed by Manoel Moreira, known as Cara de Cavalo, a criminal who operated in the Favela do Esqueleto in the 1960s, while protecting bankers from the animal gambling game so that their gambling points would not be stolen. According to reports at the time, however, Cara de Cavalo did not react to the shots fired by Le Cocq and three other police officers, and the shot that killed the detective came from the very car he was in.

The death mobilized several police officers who volunteered to participate in the investigations. Cara de Cavalo was found and killed a few days later, with more than 50 gunshots. Among the executioners were Luiz Mariano and José Guilherme Godinho Ferreira, known as Sivuca, who would later be elected state deputy for Rio de Janeiro, with the slogan "a good bandit is a dead bandit", later supplemented by "and buried standing up, so as not to take up too much space". The initials "E.M." in the coat of arms of the Scuderie Le Cocq stand for "Motorized Squad", a division of the Special Police to which detective Milton Le Cocq belonged when he was a member of the special police, and not the death squad. The emblem of the Scuderie Le Cocq was a skull on top of crossbones. With the extinction of the Special Police, Le Cocq, along with his colleagues Sivuca and Euclides, moved to the Civil Police.

== Twelve Golden Men ==
The association was led by the so-called "Twelve Golden Men", who were twelve famous police officers chosen by the Secretary of Public Security of Rio de Janeiro, Luis França, to "clean up" the city and eliminate criminals, transvestites and homeless people. The group was made up of the following civil police officers:

1. Aníbal Beckman dos Santos, known as "Cartola"
2. Elinto Pires
3. Euclides Nascimento Marinho
4. Hélio Guahyba Nunes
5. Humberto de Matos
6. Jaime de Lima
7. José Guilherme Godinho, known as Sivuca
8. Lincoln Monteiro
9. Mariel Mariscot
10. Neils Kaufman, known as "Diabo Loiro"
11. Nelson Duarte
12. Vigmar Ribeiro

== Other members ==
- Luiz Mariano

== See also ==
- Hélio Bicudo
- Carlos Manato
- Ronnie Lessa
