= Iracema: Uma Transa Amazônica =

- Brazilian poster
- Directed by: Jorge Bodanzky; Orlando Senna
- Written by: Jorge Bodanzky; Hermanno Penna; Orlando Senna
- Based on: Iracema by José de Alencar
- Produced by: Orlando Senna
- Starring: Paulo César Pereio
- Cinematography: Jorge Bodanzky
- Edited by: Jorge Bodanzky; Eva Grundman
- Music by: Jorge Bodanzky; Achim Tappen
- Release date: 1974
- Running time: 91 minutes
- Countries: Brazil; West Germany
- Language: Brazilian Portuguese

Iracema: Uma Transa Amazônica ([iʁaˈsemɐ ˈumɐ ˈtɾɐ̃zamaˈzonikɐ], "Iracema: An Amazonian Transaction") is a 1974 Brazilian Cinema Novo film directed by Jorge Bodanzky and Orlando Senna and very loosely inspired by Iracema: The Legend of Ceará, an 1865 novel by José de Alencar. The film takes place in the state of Pará. The title can refer to a deal or transaction, to the Trans-Amazonian Highway, but also to sexual intercourse.

== Production ==
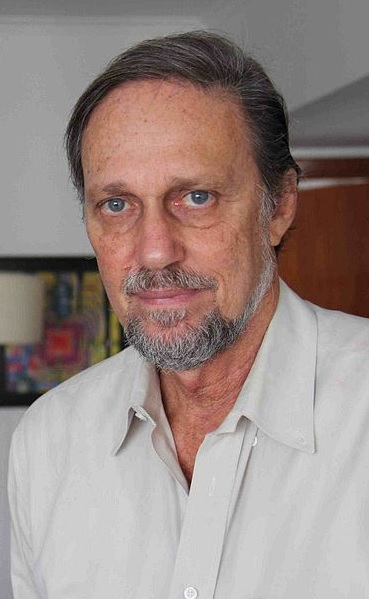
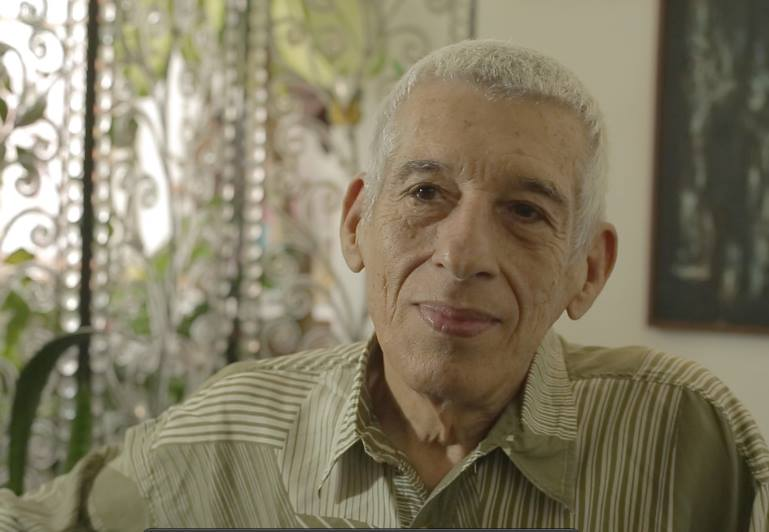
The two directors, Jorge Bodanzky (left) and Orlando Senna (right)

The film combines scripted scenes with Paulo César Pereio (the only professional actor) and documentary footage of forests being cut down, and peasants, workers and prostitutes speaking to the camera. It was filmed in 16 mm to allow filming in remote locations and to convey a chaotic, out-of-control sense of the Amazon.

== Plot ==
A White Brazilian truck driver, Tião, and a 15-year-old cabocla (mixed-race) prostitute, Iracema, drive through an Amazon that is facing rapid changes.

== Release and reception ==
Iracema was banned in Brazil (then under military rule) due to its explicit sexual content and critique of society. Its first showing abroad was at the 1975 Taormina Film Fest in Sicily, where it was nominated for the Golden Charybdis award. It showed at the International Critics' Week at the 1976 Cannes Film Festival.

Iracema was screened at the 1980 Festival de Brasília, winning prizes for Best Film, Best Actress (Edna de Cássia), Best Supporting Actress (Conceição Senna) and Best Editing (Eva Grundman and Jorge Bodanzky).

The New York Times wrote that Iracema "is a jaundiced view of the great Brazilian dream as represented by the trans-Amazon highway and the journey to the junk heap by its title character."

In 2015, Iracema was named as the 21st best Brazilian film of all time on the Abraccine Top 100 Brazilian films list.
