= Isabel Veloso =

Brazilian social media influencer (2006–2026)

- Born: May 18, 2006
- Died: January 10, 2026 (aged 19); Curitiba, Paraná, Brazil

Isabel Veloso (May 18, 2006 – January 10, 2026) was a Brazilian social media influencer, known for sharing her treatment routine for Hodgkin's lymphoma.

== Early life and career ==
Veloso was a native of Dois Vizinhos, a city in southern Brazil in Paraná.

She became known on social media for sharing her treatment routine for Hodgkin's lymphoma, a type of cancer, diagnosed when she was 15 in 2021.

On Instagram, she had accumulated more than 3.7 million followers.

== Death ==
Veloso died at Hospital Erasto Gaertner in Curitiba, on January 10, 2026, as a result of complications related from a bone marrow transplant. She was 19. She was survived by her son and her husband Lucas Borbas. She wrote a letter to her son before she died.

She was mourned in Francisco Beltrão.
