= Rivaldo Barbosa (chief of police) =

Brazilian chief of police (born 1969)

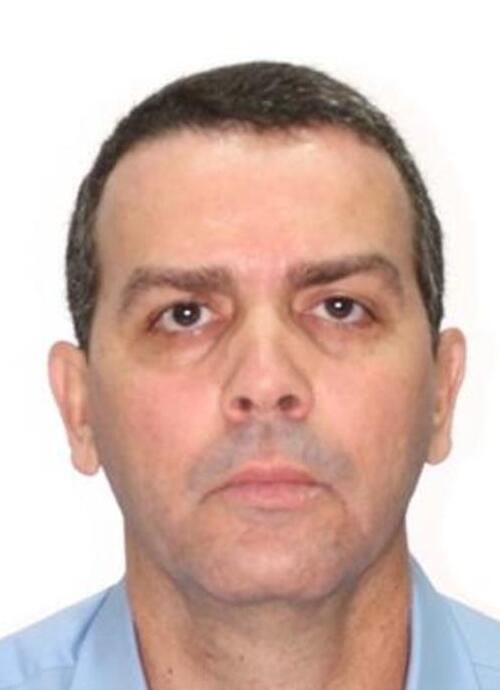

Rivaldo Barbosa de Araújo Júnior (born 31 May 1969) is a Brazilian professor and chief of police who served as Chief of the Civil Police from 13 March 2018 until December of the same year. He assumed the position one day before the assassination of Marielle Franco, following an invitation from the then–Federal Interventionist Walter Braga Netto. He is considered suspect of involvement in the assassination of councilwoman Marielle Franco and driver Anderson Gomes, more specifically of obstructing the investigations.

== Life ==
Rivaldo Barbosa de Araújo Júnior was born in the city Rio de Janeiro on 31 May 1969, to Rivaldo Barbosa de Araújo and Yolanda Palhares de Araújo. He graduated in law from UNISUAM in 1997 and pursued an MBA in Intelligence and Strategy from Salgado de Oliveira University. As of March 2024, he was a professor of criminal law at Estácio de Sá University; according to information on his LinkedIn profile, he has been professor at a "private university" since 2003.

Around 2008, Barbosa was responsible for the arrest, without a single shot fired, of João Rafael da Silva, better known as Joca, a partner of Antônio Francisco Bonfim Lopes, also known as Nem da Rocinha. He also investigated the disappearance of the mason helper Amarildo de Souza, which occurred in July 2013.

He was appointed chief of the Civil Police during the federal intervention in public security in Rio de Janeiro, decreed by then-President Michel Temer. He assumed the position one day before the assassination of Marielle Franco, following an invitation from the then–Federal Interventionist Walter Braga Netto.

As of March 2024, Barbosa was married and the father of two children.

== Assassination of Marielle Franco ==
On 24 March 2024, Barbosa was arrested, alongside Chiquinho Brazão and Domingos Brazão, on suspicions of involvement in the assassination of councilwoman Marielle Franco and driver Anderson Gomes, more specifically of obstructing the investigations; in 2019, he was accused by the Federal Police of receiving R$ 400,000 to obstruct the case. Marielle's family allegedly trusted Barbosa; Marielle's mother stated his arrest was her biggest surprise. She declared that Marielle herself trusted Barbosa's work.

On 25 February 2026, the Supreme Federal Court convicted five people, including Barbosa, for Franco's assassination. Barbosa was sentenced to 18 years' imprisonment for passive corruption and obstruction of justice.

== See also ==
- Ronnie Lessa
