= Rivaldo Morais =

Cape Verdean footballer (born 2000)

Personal information
- Full name: Rivaldo Boaventura Morais
- Date of birth: 18 September 2000 (age 26)
- Place of birth: Bærum, Norway
- Height: 1.84 m (6 ft 0 in)
- Position: Right-back

Team information
- Current team: Manama

Youth career
- 2009–2011: Estrela Amadora
- 2011–2012: Casa Pia
- 2012–2018: Damaiense
- 2018–2019: CD Portalegrense
- 2019–2020: Cova da Piedade

Senior career*
Years	Team	Apps	(Gls)
2020–2022	GD Coruchense	25	(2)
2022–2026	Farense	13	(0)
2023–2024	→ Oliveira do Hospital (loan)	24	(0)
2026–	Manama	0	(0)

International career^{‡}
2025–	Cape Verde	1	(0)
- * Club domestic league appearances and goals as of 20 May 2026 ‡ National team caps and goals as of 3 June 2025

Rivaldo Boaventura Morais (Portuguese: [ʀi.ˈval.du bo.ɐ.vẽ.ˈtu.ɾɐ mu.ˈɾajʃ]; born 18 September 2000) is a professional footballer who plays as a right-back for Bahraini club Manama. Born in Norway, he represents the Cape Verde national team.

== Early life ==
Morais was born in Norway to a Cape Verdean family, and lived there until the age of 3 when he moved to the Netherlands. At the age of 7, he moved to Portugal where he began playing football.

== Club career ==
Morais is a youth product of the Portuguese clubs Estrela Amadora, Casa Pia, Damaiense, CD Portalegrense and Cova da Piedade. He began his senior career with GD Coruchense in 2020 and played with them in the Campeonato de Portugal. In 2022, he transferred to Farense where he was assigned to their U23s, before joining Oliveira do Hospital on loan in the 2023–24 season in the Liga 3 (Portugal). He returned to Farense for the 2024–25 season where they were newly promoted to the Primeira Liga. On 11 August 2024, he made his senior and professional debut with Farense in a 2–1 Primeira Liga loss to Moreirense.

On 13 August 2026, Morais moved to Manama in Bahrain.

== International career ==
Born in Norway, Morais is of Cape Verdean descent. In October 2024, he was called up to the Cape Verde national team for a set of 2025 Africa Cup of Nations qualification matches. He debuted in a friendly 3–0 win over Malaysia on 3 June 2025.
