= Chiquinho Brazão =

Brazilian politician (born 1962)

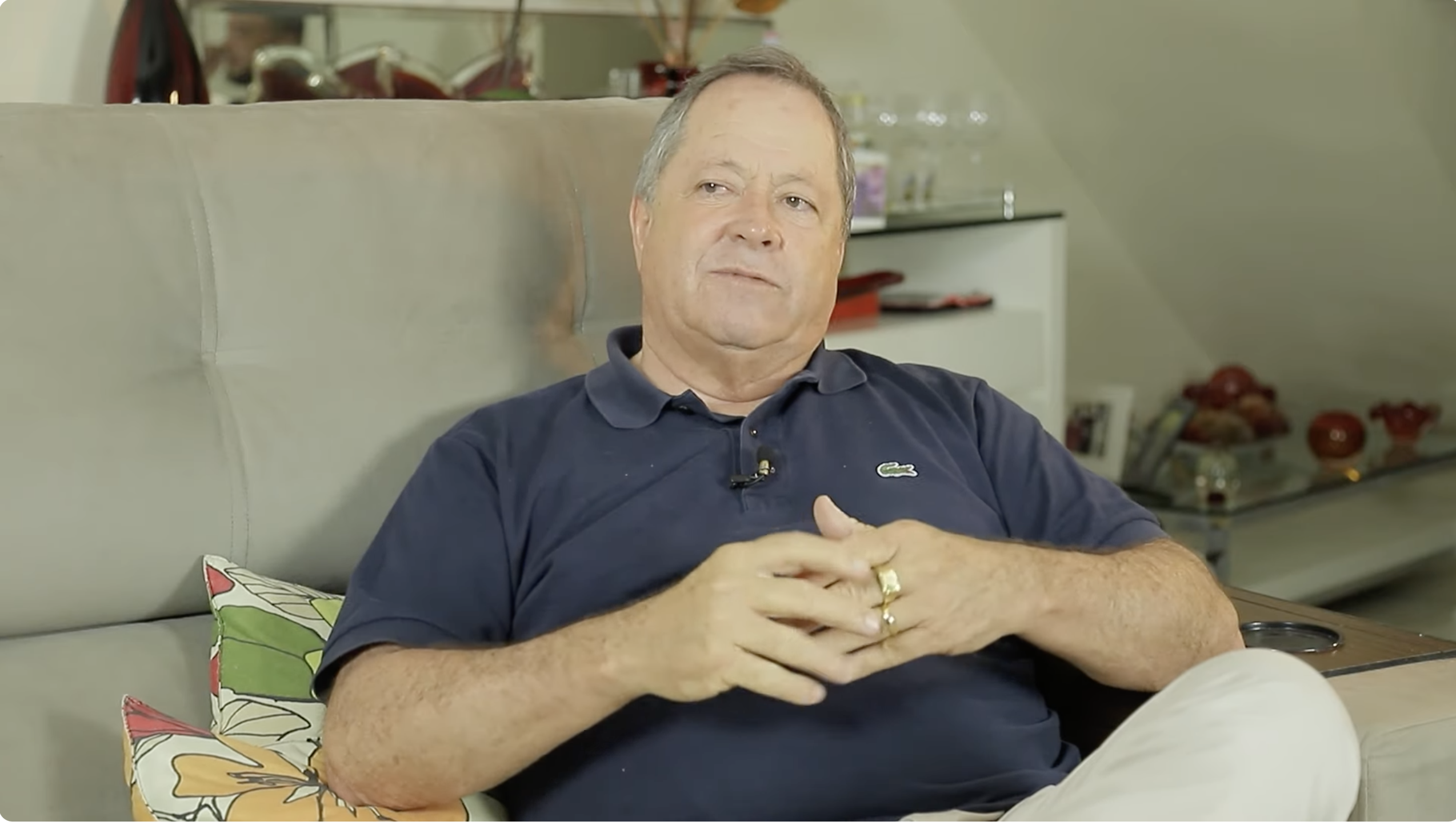

Federal Deputy
- In office 1 February 2019 – 24 April 2025; Suspended: 24 March 2024 – 24 April 2025
- Constituency: Rio de Janeiro

Councillor of Rio de Janeiro
- In office 1 January 2005 – 1 February 2019
- Constituency: At-large

Personal details
- Born: João Francisco Inácio Brazão; 22 February 1962 (age 64) Rio de Janeiro, Brazil
- Party: Independent (since 2024)
- Other political affiliations: MDB (2003–2018); Avante (2018–2022); UNIÃO (2022–2024)
- Occupation: Merchant, entrepreneur, politician
- Criminal information
- Known for: Assassination of Marielle Franco
- Status: Home arrest
- Convictions: Double homicide, attempted murder, armed criminal organization
- Penalty: 76 years and 3 months in prison

João Francisco Inácio Brazão (born 22 February 1962), better known as Chiquinho Brazão, is a Brazilian businessman and politician.

He was elected to the Brazilian Chamber of Deputies in the 2018 elections for Avante with a total vote of 25,817. Brazão is brother to Domingos Brazão and Pedro Brazão, well-known politicians.

Along with his brother Domingos Brazão, he was one of those accused of ordering the murder of councilwoman Marielle Franco. In 2025, due to Chiquinho Brazão's health condition, the minister of the Federal Supreme Court, Alexandre de Moraes, granted house arrest. He had been imprisoned in the Campo Grande Federal Penitentiary since 2024.

== Assassination of Marielle Franco ==
On 24 March 2024, Brazão was arrested, alongside his brother Domingos Brazão and chief of police Rivaldo Barbosa, on suspicions of involvement in the assassination of councilwoman Marielle Franco and driver Anderson Gomes.

On 25 February 2026, a panel of the Supreme Federal Court convicted five people, including the Brazão brothers, for Franco's assassination and sentenced them to up to 76 years' imprisonment.
