= Raimundo Rodrigues Pereira =

Brazilian journalist (1940–2026)

Raimundo Rodrigues Pereira (September 8, 1940 – May 2, 2026) was a Brazilian journalist.

== Life and career ==
Pereira was born in Exu on September 8, 2026. He was part of the team that launched Veja magazine. He was a reporter for the magazines Realidade, Ciência Ilustrada, Istoé and the newspaper Folha da Tarde. He directed the newspaper Movimento, and the magazine Senhor.

Pereira died on May 2, 2026, at the age of 85.
