= Orlando Senna =

Brazilian film director (1940–2026)

Orlando Sales de Senna (April 25, 1940 – June 9, 2026) was a Brazilian film director.

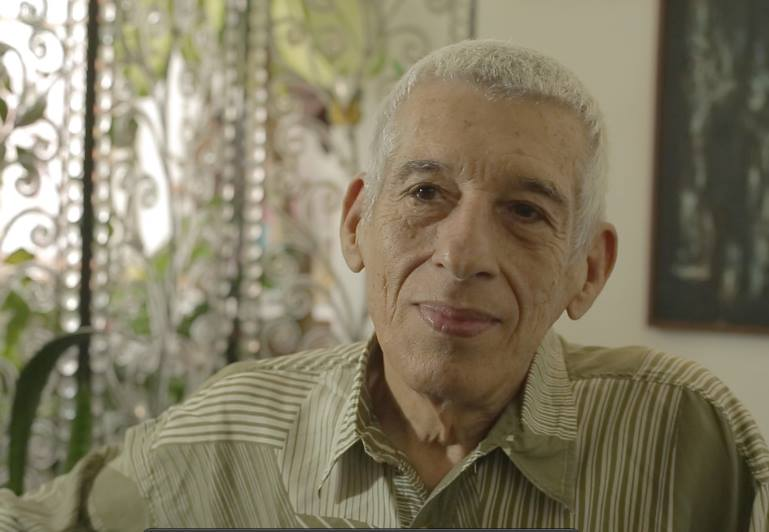
Orlando Senna

== Life and career ==
Senna acted as co-director of the 1975 film Iracema: Uma Transa Amazônica, together with Jorge Bodanzky, which was censored during the Brazilian military regime. He was linked to the Cinema Novo movement.

Senna died on June 9, 2026, at the age of 86.
