= Ronnie Lessa =

Convicted assassin of Marielle Franco

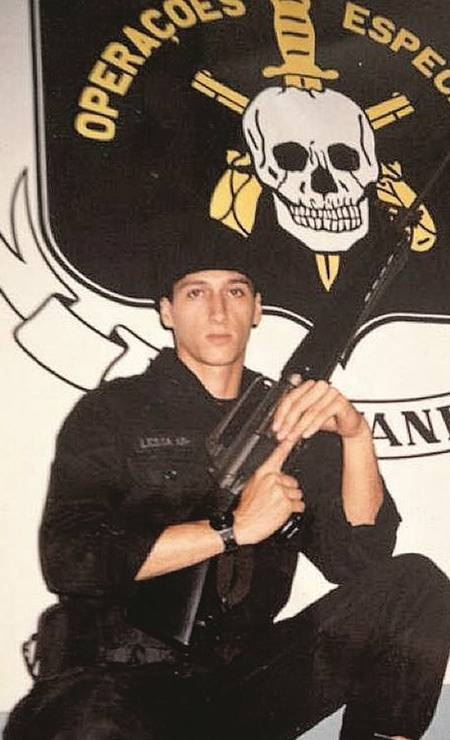
- Ronnie Lessa in the 1990s
- Born: July 15, 1970 (age 56)
- Occupation: Military police officer (until February 2023)
- Known for: Involvement in the assassination of Marielle Franco
- Convictions: Two counts of triple qualified homicide; Murder attempt; Possession of stolen car
- Penalty: 78 years, 9 months

Details
- Date apprehended: March 12, 2019

Ronnie Lessa (born July 15, 1970), rarely and erroneously referred to as Rony or Roni Lessa, is a former military police officer from Rio de Janeiro, retired in 2010, mainly known for being one of the main suspects involved in the assassination of councilwoman Marielle Franco and driver Anderson Gomes, which occurred in Rio de Janeiro on March 14, 2018. He is also known for his connection with the militia in the state.

Prior to the Marielle case, he became notorious for his work as a military and civilian police officer, receiving commendations. In 2009, he survived an assassination attempt but had part of his leg amputated, which ultimately led to his retirement. In 2022, he was convicted of international arms trafficking and is under investigation for the execution of two people in 2000, in an unrelated case to Marielle's murder.

== Early life ==
Before joining the Military Police, Lessa worked as a tattoo artist in the Méier neighborhood, in the northern zone of Rio de Janeiro. Before being arrested, he lived in the Vivendas da Barra Condominium, near the house of Jair Bolsonaro. Ronnie Lessa is married to Elaine Lessa, who, like her husband, is accused of international arms trafficking.

== Police career ==
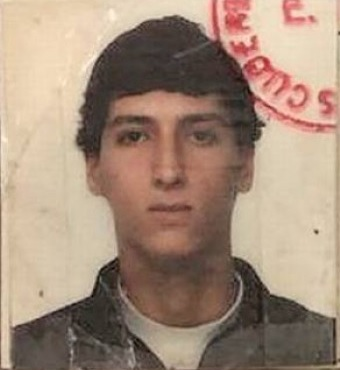
Ronnie Lessa in 1989

In 1989, Lessa joined the Scuderie Detetive Le Cocq, a death squad created in 1965 to avenge the death of detective Milton Le Cocq d'Oliveira and that aimed at avenging the deaths of police officers as well. He distinguished himself in police operations in drug-trafficking dominated favelas by taking possession of seized assets from the traffickers. In 1991, he joined the Military Police and was transferred to the Civil Police in 2003, where he served until his retirement in 2010. During his service in these law enforcement agencies, he received honors at Alerj (State Legislative Assembly of Rio de Janeiro) and a commendation at the City Council of Rio de Janeiro. According to the 2019 account from an experienced civil police officer who worked with Lessa and preferred not to be identified for safety reasons:

He felt like a soldier in the midst of the Vietnam War. We conducted several operations together with a large part of the specialized police stations of the Civil Police. Bullets were flying, and their group appeared in the worst situations. Lessa was a serial killer. He had taken several shots, but he remained standing. He was a true war soldier. A killing machine.

In 2009, Ronnie Lessa suffered serious injuries after a grenade detonated inside his car in the neighborhood of Bento Ribeiro. In an interview with Veja magazine, when asked about his relationship with Jair Bolsonaro, Lessa said that he was assisted by the then federal deputy to receive treatment at the Brazilian Beneficent Association for Rehabilitation.

Lessa is also under investigation for the execution of two individuals that allegedly took place during a police operation in the Parque Colúmbia favela in September 2000.

=== Conviction and expulsion from the force ===
In March 2019, after the arrest of Ronnie Lessa on suspicion of involvement in the homicide of Marielle Franco and Anderson Gomes, the Civil Police found 117 disassembled rifles at the home of a friend of Ronnie Lessa. This was the largest seizure of this type of weapon in the history of Rio de Janeiro. The resident of the house stated that he kept the equipment at Lessa's request, leading to an investigation for arms trafficking.

In August 2022, Lessa was sentenced to thirteen years in prison for international arms trafficking. In February 2023, due to the conviction for arms trafficking, Lessa was expelled from the Military Police.

== Assassination of Marielle Franco ==
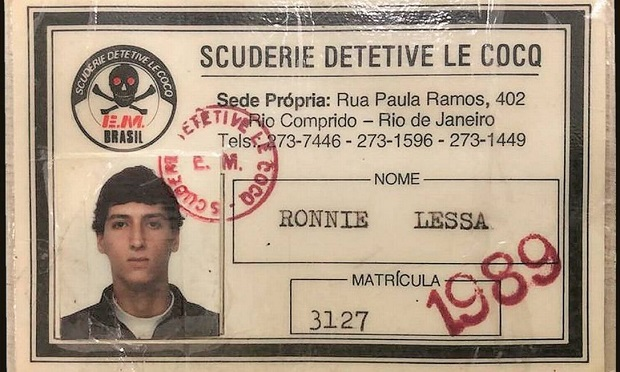
Ronnie Lessa (member of Esquadrão da Morte)

Ronnie Lessa was accused of being the shooter in the attack on the vehicle in which the councilwoman was traveling. According to information released by the police and the media at the time, he was alleged to have been the perpetrator of the shots that killed Marielle and Anderson.

Until September 2019, it was known, according to a report from the Security and Intelligence Coordinator of the Public Prosecutor's Office of the State of Rio de Janeiro, that retired military police sergeant Ronnie Lessa, accused of the assassination, was the leader of a militia in the western zone of Rio de Janeiro. He was the owner of an illegal bingo hall in Barra da Tijuca and had plans, before his arrest, to expand his water distribution business into areas controlled by drug traffickers in the city. The report provided the basis for a request accepted by the Rio de Janeiro Justice to transfer Lessa to the federal prison system.

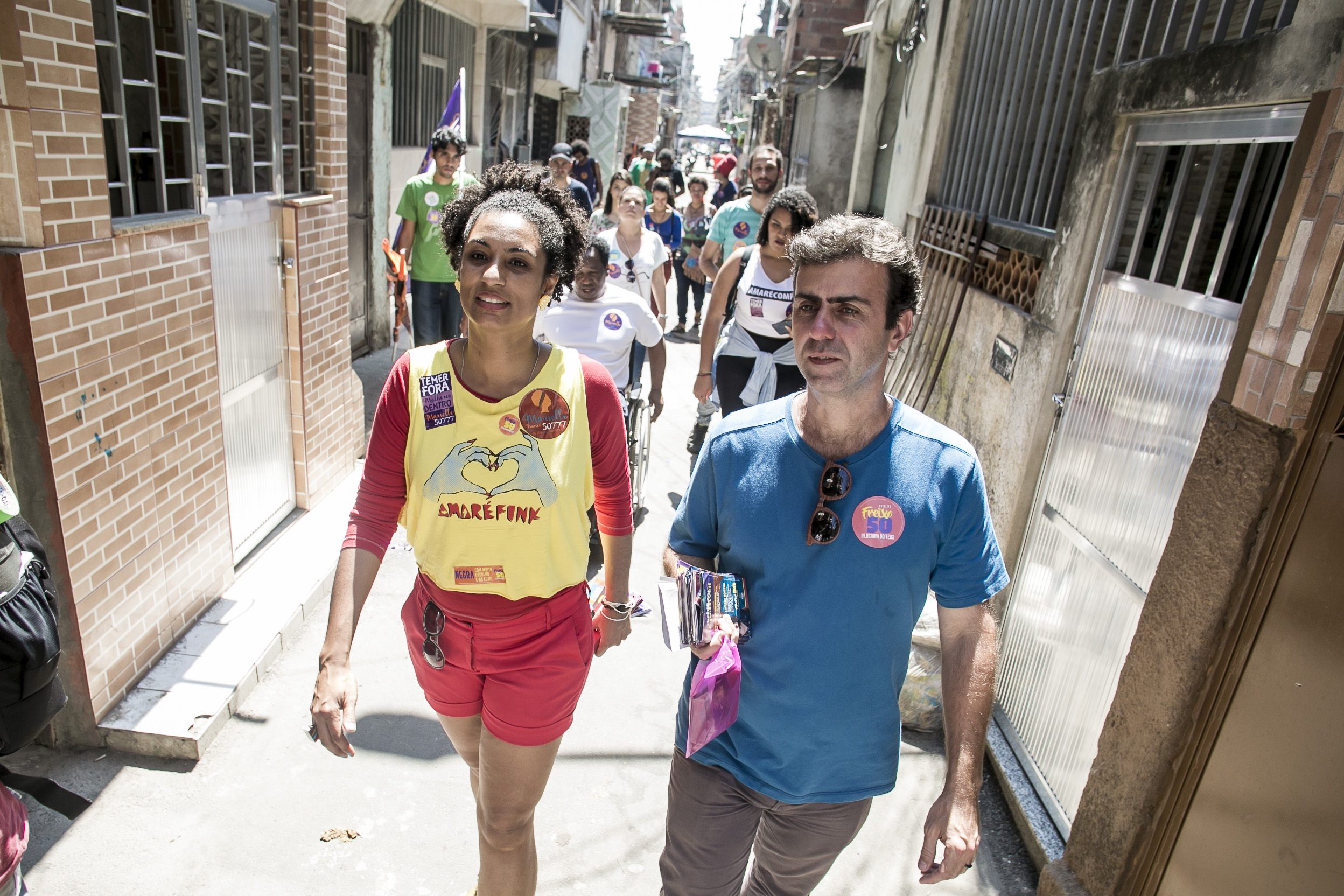
Marielle Franco and Marcelo Freixo

In mid-December 2020, the Civil Police and the Public Prosecutor's Office found an important lead to solve the crime. According to the report, Eduardo Almeida Nunes de Siqueira, a resident of Muzema, a favela controlled by the militia, cloned a car of the same model that was used in the homicide. Additionally, Siqueira was represented by the same lawyer as Ronnie Lessa, who is considered the executor of the councilwoman. He confessed to cloning many vehicles, including a silver 2014 Cobalt, which was exactly the type of car used by the gunmen. Siqueira did not know how the car was used, but he noticed a significant resemblance between what he cloned and what was used in the crime. The police were also pursuing other lines of investigation, such as confirming that the order to kill Marielle came from former firefighter, ex-councilman, and militia member Cristiano Girão, with the aim of seeking revenge against federal deputy Marcelo Freixo, as Girão was one of the frequent names on the list of Militias' CPI (Congressional Inquiry) drawn up by the parliamentarian.

=== Collaboration of Élcio de Queiroz ===
In July 2023, Élcio de Queiroz entered into a plea bargain with the Federal Police and the Public Prosecutor's Office and provided detailed information on how the crime was committed. According to information reported in the media, the crime had been premeditated since 2017, and there was even an unsuccessful attempt in the same year. When the murder actually took place, everything began with a meeting between Lessa and Élcio at the former's condominium. They strategically positioned themselves in a car and pursued the councilwoman's vehicle, firing shots when the vehicle slowed down. After carrying out the crime, they went to a bar and drank until the early hours of the morning. The next day, they completed the operation by disposing of the car used in the crime, taking care to alter it before doing so.
