= Ipiranga, Paraná =

Coordinates: 25°01′26″S 50°35′02″W

- Municipality
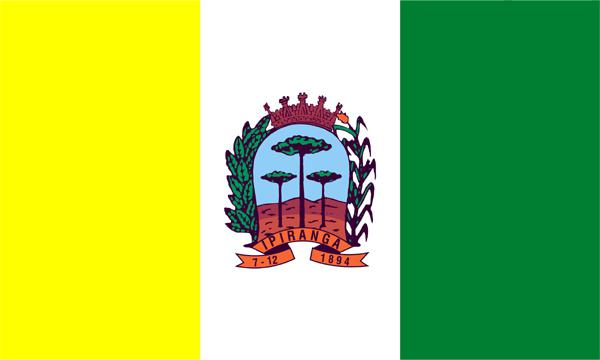
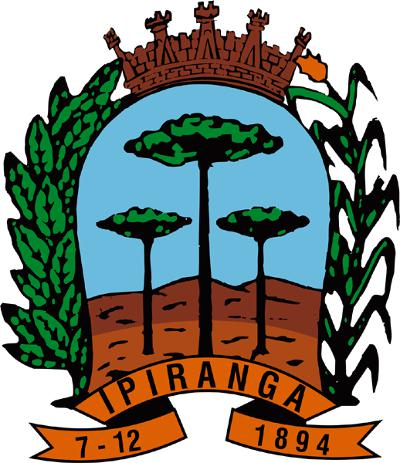
- Flag Coat of arms
- Interactive map of Ipiranga, Paraná
- Country: Brazil
- Region: Southern
- State: Paraná
- Mesoregion: Sudeste Paranaense

Population (2020)
  - Total: 15,251
- Time zone: UTC−3 (BRT)

Ipiranga, Paraná is a municipality in the state of Paraná in the Southern Region of Brazil.

== See also ==
- List of municipalities in Paraná
