= Domingos Brazão =

Brazilian politician (born 1965)

- Born: 7 March 1965 (age 60)
- Occupations: Politician, former state congressman and adviser

Domingos Inácio Brazão (born 7 March 1965), mononymously known as Brazão, is a Brazilian politician, former state congressman and adviser to Rio de Janeiro's court of auditors.

== Assassination of Marielle Franco ==
On 24 March 2024, Brazão was arrested, alongside his brother Chiquinho Brazão and chief of police Rivaldo Barbosa, on suspicions of involvement in the assassination of councilwoman Marielle Franco and driver Anderson Gomes.

On 25 February 2026, a panel of the Supreme Federal Court convicted five people, including the Brazão brothers, for Franco's assassination and sentenced them to up to 76 years' imprisonment.
