= Milton Le Cocq =

Brazilian police officer (1920 – 1964)

Milton Le Cocq d'Oliveira

Personal details
- Born: June 10, 1920 Rio de Janeiro, Brazil
- Died: August 27, 1964 (aged 44) Rio de Janeiro, Brazil
- Profession: Police officer

Milton Le Cocq d'Oliveira (June 10, 1920 – August 27, 1964), known as Detective Le Cocq, was a police detective in the state of Rio de Janeiro (formerly the Federal District), and a member of Getúlio Vargas' personal guard.

== Biography ==
Of French descent, he was one of the most notable Brazilian detectives and gained prominence for his ability to solve complex cases throughout his career. He was described as the best detective in the Rio de Janeiro police force at the time. In 1962, he was responsible for the manhunt that killed the notorious criminal José Miranda Rosa, better known as Mineirinho.

Described as "an idol within the police force", Le Cocq was killed on August 27, 1964, during a confrontation with the criminal Cara de Cavalo. His death led to the mobilization of two thousand police officers and culminated in the death of Cara de Cavalo, shot 52 times.

The Scuderie Detetive Le Cocq, the most famous Brazilian death squad, was created to avenge the death of Detective Le Cocq and named in his honor.

== Bibliography ==
- PENGLASE, B.; KIMZEY, R. Final Justice: Police and Death Squad Homicides of Adolescents in Brazil. Reino Unido: Human Rights Watch, 1994. 112 p. ISBN 1564321231.
