= 2022 Minas Gerais general election =

Regional elections in Brazil

2022 Minas Gerais state election
- 2 October 2022 (first round)
- Opinion polls
- Gubernatorial election
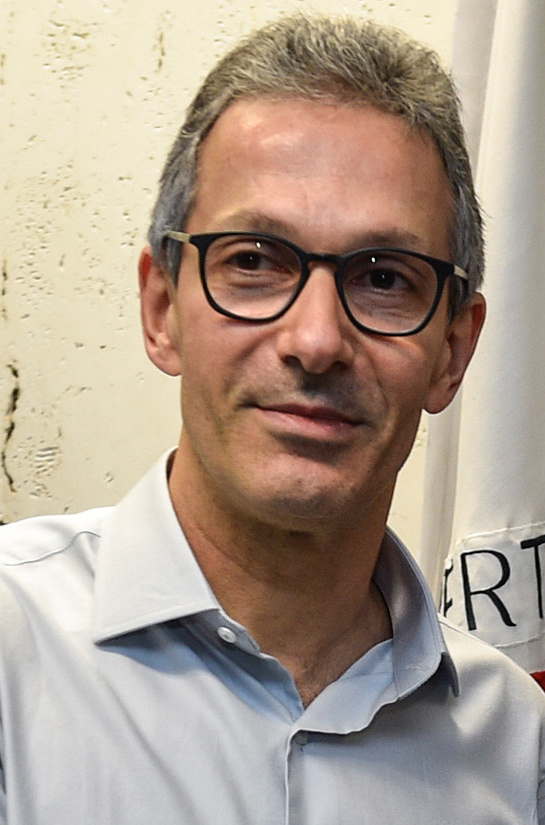

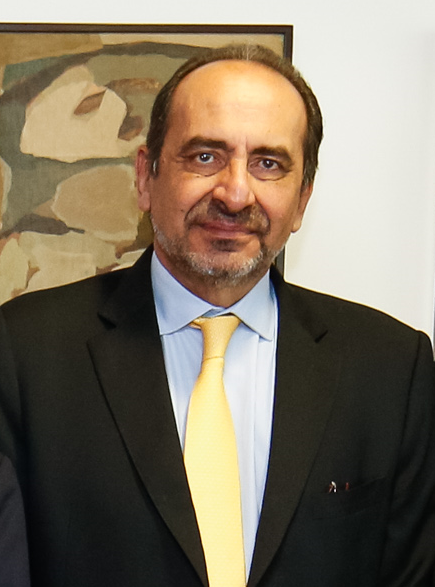

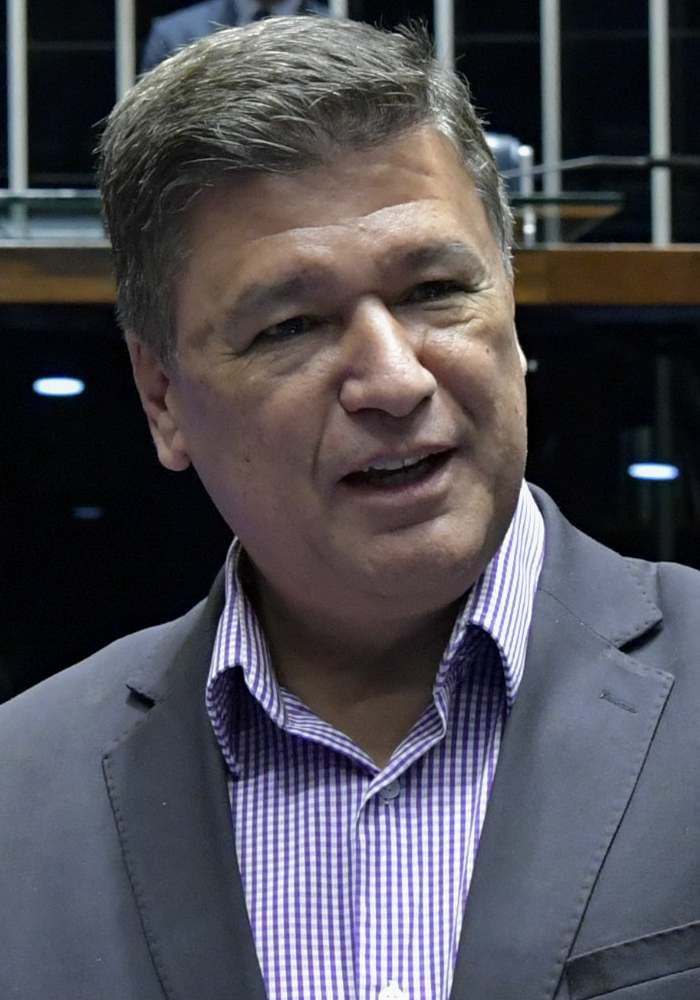
Candidate	Romeu Zema	Alexandre Kalil	Carlos Viana
Party	NOVO	PSD	PL
Alliance	Minas on the Tracks	Together for the People of Minas Gerais	Loyalty for Minas
Running mate	Mateus Simões	André Quintão	Colonel Wanderley
Popular vote	6,094,136	3,805,182	783,800
Percentage	56.18%	35.08%	7.23%
- Romeu Zema Alexandre Kalil Carlos Viana
Governor before election
Romeu Zema
NOVO
Elected Governor
Romeu Zema
NOVO
- Parliamentary election
- All 77 seats of the Legislative Assembly
Party	Leader	Current seats
Legislative Assembly
PT	n/a	10
PSD	n/a	10
PL	n/a	9
PV	n/a	7
Cidadania	n/a	4
PSDB	n/a	4
MDB	n/a	4
UNIÃO	n/a	3
Avante	n/a	3
PDT	n/a	3
Patriota	n/a	3
Republicanos	n/a	3
PSB	n/a	2
PODE	n/a	2
NOVO	n/a	2
PSC	n/a	2
PP	n/a	1
REDE	n/a	1
PCdoB	n/a	1
PROS	n/a	1
Solidarity	n/a	1
PTB	n/a	1
- Senatorial election
- 2 October 2022 (one-only round)
- Opinion polls
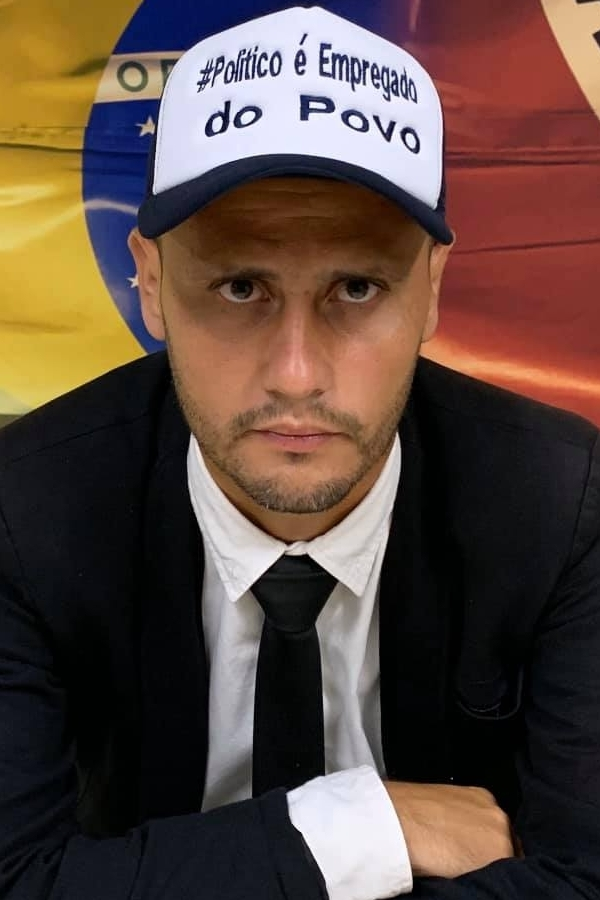

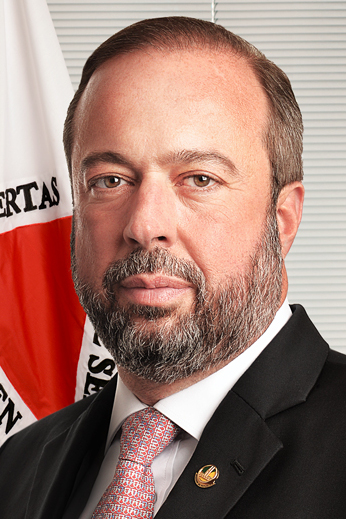

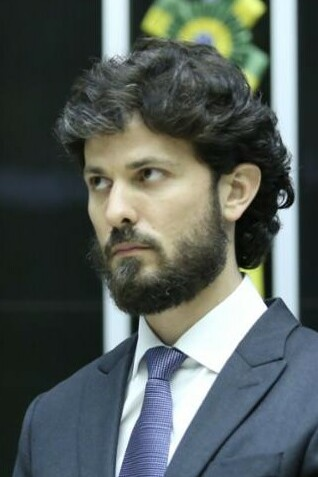
Candidate	Cleitinho Azevedo	Alexandre Silveira	Marcelo Aro
Party	PSC (Note: Elected under the banner of the Social Christian Party, Cleitinho affiliated with Republicanos before his inauguration in February of 2023.)	PSD	PP
Popular vote	4,268,193	3,679,392	2,025,573
Percentage	41.52%	35.79%	19.70%
- Cleitinho Azevedo Alexandre Silveira Marcelo Aro
Senator before election
Alexandre Silveira
PSD
Elected Senator
Cleitinho Azevedo
Republicanos

The 2022 Minas Gerais state elections took place in the state of Minas Gerais, Brazil on 2 October 2022. Voters elected a governor, vice governor, one senator, 53 representatives for the Chamber of Deputies, and 77 Legislative Assembly members. The incumbent governor, Romeu Zema, a member of the New Party, was eligible for a second term, and intended to run for reelection.

For the election to the Federal Senate, the seat occupied by Alexandre Silveira, from the Social Democratic Party (PSD), was at dispute. Silveira took office in February 2022 with the resignation of the incumbent elected in 2014, Antônio Anastasia (PSDB). Anastasia took office as a justice of the Federal Court of Accounts of Brazil (TCU).

== Electoral calendar ==
Note: This section only presents the main dates of the 2022 electoral calendar, check the TSE official website (in Portuguese) and other official sources for detailed information.

Electoral calendar
15 May	Start of crowdfunding of candidates
20 July to 5 August	Party conventions for choosing candidates and coalitions
16 August to 30 September	Period of exhibition of free electoral propaganda on radio, television and on the internet related to the first round
2 October	First round of 2022 elections
7 October to 28 October	Period of exhibition of free electoral propaganda on radio, television and on the internet related to a possible second round
30 October	Possible second round of 2022 elections
until 19 December	Delivery of electoral diplomas for those who were elected in the 2022 elections by the Brazilian Election Justice

== Gubernatorial election ==
Political parties have until 15 August 2022 to formally register their candidates.

=== Potential candidates ===
Candidate name and party		Most recent political office	Party logo	Details	Ref.
Alexandre Kalil; Social Democratic Party (PSD)		Mayor of Belo Horizonte (2017–2022)		Born in Belo Horizonte, Minas Gerais in 1959. Former president of Clube Atlético Mineiro, a football club based in Belo Horizonte, Brazil	
Romeu Zema; New Party (NOVO)	Romeu Zema	Governor of Minas Gerais (since 2019)		Born in Araxá, Minas Gerais in 1964. Businessman and current governor of Minas Gerais.	
Carlos Viana; Liberal Party (PL)	Carlos Viana	Senator for Minas Gerais (since 2019)		Born in Braúnas, Minas Gerais in 1963. Brazilian journalist.	
Marcus Pestana; Brazilian Social Democracy Party (PSDB)		Federal Deputy for Minas Gerais (2011–2019)		Born in Juíz de Fora, Minas Gerais in 1960. Councillor of Juíz de Fora (1983–1988).	
Lorene Figueiredo; Socialism and Liberty Party (PSOL)		No prior public office		Born in the city of Rio de Janeiro in 1966. Teacher and candidate for mayor in 2020 Juíz de Fora mayoral election.	
Miguel Corrêa; Democratic Labour Party (PDT)		Federal Deputy for Minas Gerais (2007–2019)		Born in Belo Horizonte, Minas Gerais in 1978. Entrepreneur and teacher.	
Renata Regina; Brazilian Communist Party (PCB)		No prior public office		Born in Belo Horizonte, Minas Gerais in 1986. Activist and candidate for federal deputy for Minas Gerais in 2018 Minas Gerais gubernatorial election.	
Pastor Altamiro Alves; Brazilian Labour Party (PTB)		No prior public office		Evangelical pastor.	
Vanessa Portugal; United Socialist Workers' Party (PSTU)		No prior public office		Born in Boa Esperança, Minas Gerais in 1970. Teacher and candidate for senator in 2018 Minas Gerais gubernatorial election.	
Indira Xavier; Popular Unity (UP)		No prior public office		Coordinator of the Tina Martins Women's House.	

=== Withdrawn candidates ===
- Saraiva Felipe (PSB) - Federal deputy for Minas Gerais (1995–2019) and minister of health of Brazil (2005–2006). His political party, the Brazilian Socialist Party (PSB) withdrew the former minister's candidacy for the state government to support Alexandre Kalil.
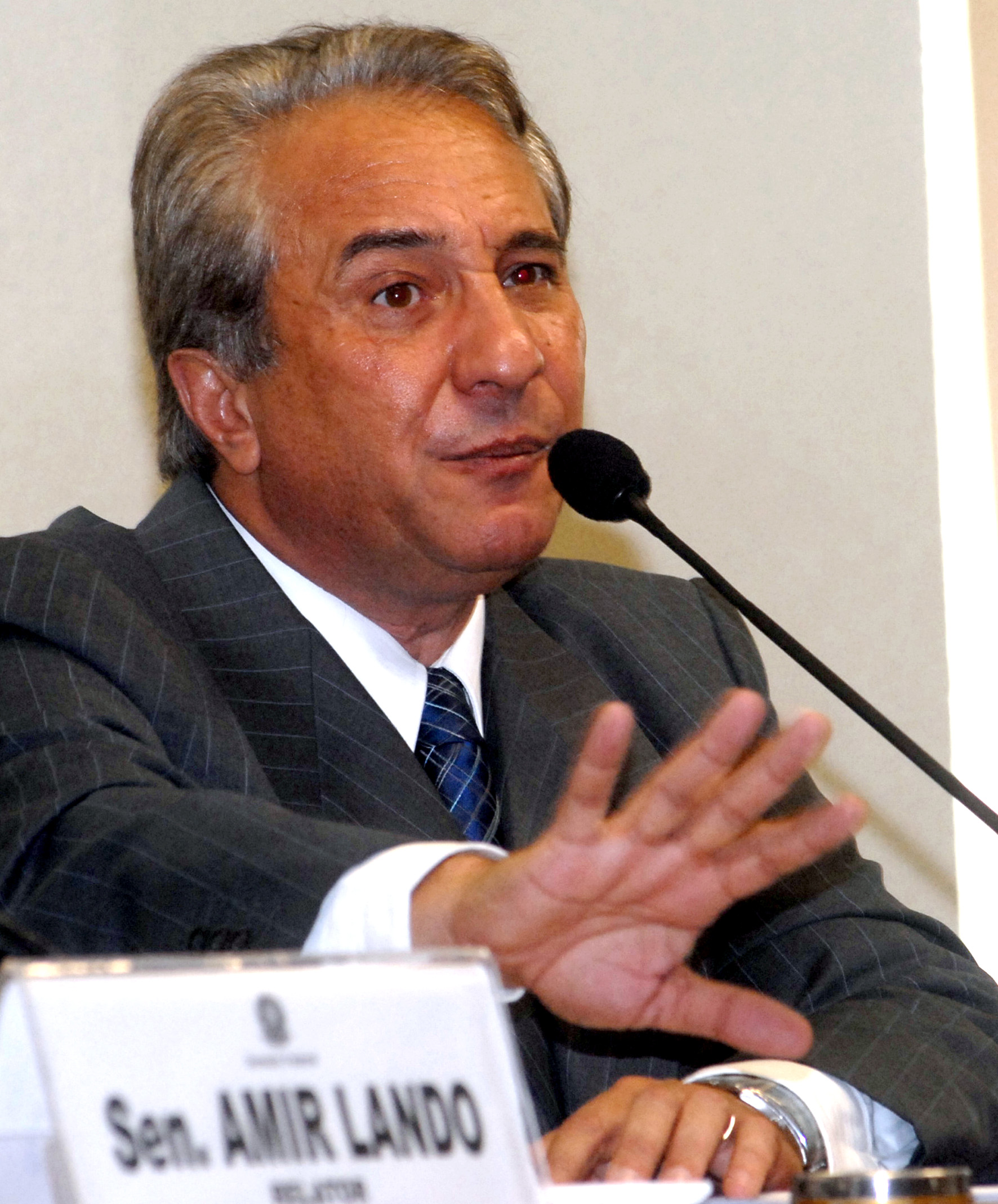
Minister of Health
Saraiva Felipe (PSB)

== Senatorial election ==
Political parties have until 15 August 2022 to formally register their candidates.

Potential candidates

Candidate name and party	Most recent political office	Party logo	Details	Ref.
Aécio Neves; Brazilian Social Democracy Party (PSDB)	Federal Deputy for Minas Gerais (since 2019)		Born in Belo Horizonte, Minas Gerais in 1960. Senator for Minas Gerais (2011–2019) and governor of Minas Gerais (2003–2010).	
Cleitinho Azevedo; Social Christian Party (PSC)	State Deputy of Minas Gerais (since 2019)		Born in Divinópolis, Minas Gerais in 1982.	
Alexandre Silveira; Social Democratic Party (PSD)	Senator for Minas Gerais (since 2022)		Born in Belo Horizonte, Minas Gerais in 1970. Former police chief and merchant.	
Paulo Piau; Brazilian Democratic Movement (MDB)	Mayor of Uberaba (2013–2021)		Born in Patos de Minas, Minas Gerais in 1953. Agriculturist.	
Carlos Melles; Liberal Party (PL)	Minister of Sport and Tourism of Brazil (2000–2002)		Born in São Sebastião do Paraíso, Minas Gerais in 1947. Agriculturist and politician.	
Marcelo Álvaro Antônio; Liberal Party (PL)	Federal Deputy for Minas Gerais (since 2019)		Born in Belo Horizonte, Minas Gerais in 1974. Minister of tourism of Brazil (2019–2020).	
Reginaldo Lopes; Workers' Party (PT)	Federal Deputy for Minas Gerais (since 2003)		Born in Bom Sucesso, Minas Gerais in 1973. Economist.	
Sara Azevedo; Socialism and Liberty Party (PSOL)	No prior public office		Born in Belém, Pará in 1985. Teacher and candidate for federal deputy in 2014, running mate of Dirlene Marques in 2018 Minas Gerais gubernatorial election and candidate for councillor of Belo Horizonte in 2020.	
Gilson Lopes; Communist Party of Brazil (PCdoB)	Councillor of Belo Horizonte (2013–2021)		Born in Belo Horizonte, Minas Gerais in 1963. Former president of the National Confederation of Workers in Educational Establishments (CONTEE).	

== Legislative Assembly ==
The result of the last state election and the current situation in the Legislative Assembly of Minas Gerais is given below:

Affiliation	Members		+/–
Affiliation	Elected	Current	+/–
PSD	4	10	▲6
PT	10	10	Steady
PL	2	9	▲7
PV	5	7	▲2
Cidadania	1	4	▲3
PSDB	7	4	▼3
MDB	7	4	▼3
UNIÃO	New	3	▲3
Avante	2	3	▲1
PDT	2	3	▲1
Patriota	2	3	▲1
Republicanos	3	3	Steady
PSB	1	2	▲1
PODE	2	2	Steady
NOVO	3	2	▼1
PSC	3	2	▼1
PP	1	1	Steady
REDE	1	1	Steady
PCdoB	1	1	Steady
PROS	1	1	Steady
Solidarity	2	1	▼1
PTB	3	1	▼2
PSOL	1	0	▼1
DC	1	0	▼1
PRP	1	0	▼1
PRTB	1	0	▼1
DEM	1	0	▼1
PHS	3	0	▼3
PSL	6	0	▼6
Total	77		–

== Opinion polling ==
=== First round ===
The first round was scheduled to take place on 2 October 2022.

Pollster/client(s)	Date(s) conducted	Sample size	Zema NOVO	Kalil PSD	Viana PL	Pestana PSDB	Corrêa PDT	Vanessa PSTU	Lorene PSOL	Others	Abst. Undec.	Lead
Instituto Equilíbrio Brasil	5–7 Jul 22	1.460	51,8%	24,1%	3,8%	3,3%	1,2%	–	–	–	15,8%	27,7%
EXAME/IDEIA	1–6 Jul 22	1.000	46%	25%	5%	6%	1%	1%	2%	2% (Note: Renata Regina (PCB) with 1% and Saraiva Felipe (PSB) with 1%)	13%	21%
Genial/Quaest	2–5 Jul 22	1.480	44%	26%	2%	1%	1%	1%	1%	–	24%	18%
Genial/Quaest	2–5 Jul 22	1.480	46%	29%	5%	–	–	–	–	–	20%	17%
Genial/Quaest	2–5 Jul 22	1.480	26%	42%	15%	–	–	–	–	(Note: Possible electoral scenario in which the presidential candidate Lula (PT) supports Alexandre Kalil (PSD) for the government of Minas Gerais, Luiz Felipe d'Avila (NOVO) supports Romeu Zema for reelection and Bolsonaro (PL) supports Carlos Viana (PL) for the government.)	17%	16%
Datafolha	29 Jun–1 Jul 22	1.204	48%	21%	4%	1%	2%	3%	1%	3% (Note: Renata Regina (PCB) with 2% and Saraiva Felipe (PSB) with 1%)	18%	27%
28 June 2022	The Brazilian Socialist Party (PSB) decides to withdraw Saraiva Felipe's candidacy for the government to support Alexandre Kalil.											
Pollster/client(s)	Date(s) conducted	Sample size	Zema NOVO	Kalil PSD	Viana PL	Pestana PSDB	Corrêa PDT	Saraiva PSB	Lorene PSOL	Others	Abst. Undec.	Lead
Instituto F5 Atualiza Dados	13–16 Jun 22	1.560	45,7%	28,4%	4,1%	1,5%	1,8%	0,2%	0,3%	2,4% (Note: Vanessa Portugal (PSTU) with 1,3% and Renata Regina (PCB) with 1,1%)	15,6%	17,3%
DataTempo	27 May–1 Jun 22	2.000	45,7%	22,1%	4%	1,6%	1,4%	–	1%	2,1% (Note: Renata Regina (PCB) with 2,1%)	22%	23,6%
DataTempo	27 May–1 Jun 22	2.000	47,4%	24,2%	–	1,5%	1,8%	–	1,2%	2,9%	21%	23,2%
DataTempo	27 May–1 Jun 22	2.000	24,4%	40,4%	15,5%	–	–	–	–	(Note: Possible electoral scenario in which the presidential candidate Lula (PT) supports Alexandre Kalil (PSD) for the government of Minas Gerais, Luiz Felipe d'Avila (NOVO) supports Romeu Zema for reelection and Bolsonaro (PL) supports Carlos Viana (PL) for the government.)	19,7%	16%
Real Time Big Data	27–28 May 22	1.500	43%	29%	7%	3%	1%	1%	1%	(Note: Renata Regina (PCB) with 0%)	15%	14%
Paraná Pesquisas	8–13 May 22	1.680	46,8%	26,8%	5,4%	–	–	–	–	2,8% (Note: Marcus Pestana (PSDB) with 1,7%; Renata Regina (PCB) with 0,6%; Miguel Corrêa (PDT) with 0,3% and Lorene Figueiredo (PSOL) with 0,2%)	18,2%	20%
Paraná Pesquisas	8–13 May 22	1.680	47,7%	27,3%	5,4%	–	–	–	–	1,1% (Note: Renata Regina (PCB) with 0,6%; Miguel Corrêa (PDT) with 0,3% and Lorene Figueiredo (PSOL) with 0,2%)	18,5%	20,4%
Paraná Pesquisas	8–13 May 22	1.680	48,5%	27,5%	5,5%	–	–	–	–	–	18,6%	21%
10 May 2022	The Brazilian Social Democracy Party (PSDB) breaks the political alliance with Romeu Zema and the candidacy of Marcus Pestana for the state government is announced.											
Pollster/client(s)	Date(s) conducted	Sample size	Zema NOVO	Kalil PSD	Viana PL	Janones AVANTE	Salabert PDT	Lopes PT	Lacerda Ind.	Others	Abst. Undec.	Lead
Genial/Quaest	7–10 May 22	1.480	41%	30%	9%	–	–	–	–	–	21%	11%
Genial/Quaest	7–10 May 22	1.480	22%	43%	16%	–	–	–	–	(Note: Possible electoral scenario in which the presidential candidate Lula (PT) supports Alexandre Kalil (PSD) for the government of Minas Gerais, Luiz Felipe d'Avila (NOVO) supports Romeu Zema for reelection and Bolsonaro (PL) supports Carlos Viana (PL) for the government.)	19%	21%
DataTempo	30 Apr–5 May 22	2.000	43,5%	22,8%	4,2%	–	–	–	–	–	13,1%	20,7%
Itatiata / Instituto Ver	14–17 Apr 22	1.500	44%	22%	5%	–	–	–	–	–	29%	22%
Itatiata / Instituto Ver	14–17 Apr 22	1.500	32%	33%	13%	–	–	–	–	(Note: Possible electoral scenario in which the presidential candidate Lula (PT) supports Alexandre Kalil (PSD) for the government of Minas Gerais, Luiz Felipe d'Avila (NOVO) supports Romeu Zema for reelection and Bolsonaro (PL) supports Carlos Viana (PL) for the government)	22%	1%
Quaest/Genial	11–16 Mar 22	1.480	34%	21%	5%	7%	–	–	–	10% (Note: Cleitinho Azevedo (Cidadania) with 6%; Vittorio Medioli (Ind.) with 2%; Daniel Sucupira (PT) with 1% and Miguel Corrêa (PDT) with 1%)	23%	13%
Quaest/Genial	11–16 Mar 22	1.480	40%	26%	6%	–	–	–	–	4% (Note: Vittorio Medioli (Ind.) with 4%)	24%	14%
Quaest/Genial	11–16 Mar 22	1.480	42%	28%	–	–	–	–	–	6% (Note: Vittorio Medioli (Ind.) with 6%)	24%	14%
Quaest/Genial	11–16 Mar 22	1.480	49%	33%	–	–	–	–	–	(Note: Possible electoral scenario in which there is no support from any of the presidential candidates: Lula (PT) or Jair Bolsonaro (PL) for the candidates for the government of Minas Gerais)	18%	16%
Quaest/Genial	11–16 Mar 22	1.480	35%	49%	–	–	–	–	–	(Note: Possible electoral scenario in which the presidential candidate Lula (PT) supports Alexandre Kalil (PSD) for the government of Minas Gerais, and Bolsonaro (PL) supports Romeu Zema (NOVO) for reelection)	16%	14%
Real Time Big Data	12–15 Mar 22	1.500	40%	23%	4%	–	–	–	–	5% (Note: Vittorio Medioli (Ind.) with 3% and Daniel Sucupira (PT) with 2%)	28%	17%
F5/EM	14–17 Feb 22	1.560	46,8%	17,4%	3,7%	7,3%	–	–	–	–	24,8%	29,4%
Paraná Pesquisas	3–5 Nov 21	1.540	46,5%	22,5%	2,2%	5,7%	2,8%	2,1%	1,7%	1,4% (Note: Áurea Carolina (PSOL) with 0,8% and Marcelo Álvaro Antônio (PSL) with 0,6%)	15%	24%
DataTempo/CP2	29 Oct–3 Nov 21	1.402	45,1%	22,5%	–	–	–	2,9%	–	9,8% (Note: Rodrigo Pacheco (PSD) with 5,3%, Áurea Carolina (PSOL) with 2,6% and Paulo Brant (PSDB) with 1,9%)	19,7%	22,6%
DataTempo/CP2	24–27 Sep 21	1.392	40,4%	19,1%	–	–	–	4,2%		13,4% (Note: Others (unspecified) with 6,3%, Rodrigo Pacheco (PSD) with 5% and Áurea Carolina (PSOL) with 2,1%)	22,9%	21,3%
Real Time Big Data	21–22 Sep 21	1.000	38%	23%	2%	7%	–	2%	–	3% (Note: Áurea Carolina (PSOL) with 3%)	25%	15%
DataTempo/CP2	17–20 Jul 21	1.300	46,2%	18,8%	–	–	–	3,5%	–	11,5% (Note: Others (unspecified) with 8,5% and Rodrigo Pacheco (PSD) with 3%)	19,8%	27,4%
DataTempo/CP2	17–20 Jul 21	1.300	50,2%	23,9%	–	–	–	4,8%	–	3,7% (Note: Áurea Carolina (PSOL) with 3,7%)	17,3%	26,3%

=== Second round ===
The second round (if necessary) was scheduled to take place on 30 October 2022.

Zema vs. Kalil

Pollster/client(s)	Date(s) conducted	Sample size	Zema NOVO	Kalil PSD	Abst. Undec.	Lead
EXAME/IDEIA	1–6 Jul 22	1.000	55%	31%	14%	24%
Genial/Quaest	2–5 Jul 22	1.480	50%	34%	16%	16%
DataTempo	27 May–1 Jun 22	2.000	52,2%	31,5%	16,3%	20,7%
Real Time Big Data	27–28 May 22	1.500	48%	35%	17%	13%
Genial/Quaest	7–10 May 22	1.480	48%	35%	17%	13%
DataTempo	30 Apr–5 May 22	2.000	49,8%	32,7%	17,6%	17,1%
Itatiata / Instituto Ver	14–17 Apr 22	1.500	48%	29%	23%	19%
Quaest/Genial	11–16 Mar 22	1.480	49%	33%	19%	16%
Real Time Big Data	12–15 Mar 22	1.500	47%	27%	26%	20%
DataTempo/CP2	29 Oct–3 Nov 21	1.402	56,2%	28,1%	15,8%	28,1%
DataTempo/CP2	24–27 Sep 21	1.392	50,8%	35,6%	13,6%	15,2%

Zema vs. Viana

Pollster/client(s)	Date(s) conducted	Sample size	Zema NOVO	Viana PL	Abst. Undec.	Lead
EXAME/IDEIA	1–6 Jul 22	1.000	60%	25%	14%	35%
Genial/Quaest	2–5 Jul 22	1.480	61%	15%	24%	46%
DataTempo	27 May–1 Jun 22	2.000	60,3%	16,2%	23,6%	44,1%
Genial/Quaest	7–10 May 22	1.480	59%	18%	23%	41%
DataTempo	30 Apr–5 May 22	2.000	57,7%	17,8%	24,5%	39,9%
Itatiata / Instituto Ver	14–17 Apr 22	1.500	55%	13%	32%	42%
Quaest/Genial	11–16 Mar 22	1.480	57%	18%	26%	39%

Kalil vs. Viana

Pollster/client(s)	Date(s) conducted	Sample size	Kalil PSD	Viana PL	Abst. Undec.	Lead
EXAME/IDEIA	1–6 Jul 22	1.000	40%	30%	30%	10%
DataTempo	27 May–1 Jun 22	2.000	42,6%	19%	38,4%	23,6%
DataTempo	30 Apr–5 May 22	2.000	44,2%	21,8%	34,1%	22,4%

Zema vs. Medioli

Pollster/client(s)	Date(s) conducted	Sample size	Zema NOVO	Medioli Ind.	Abst. Undec.	Lead
Quaest/Genial	11–16 Mar 22	1.480	59%	14%	27%	45%

Zema vs. Pacheco

Pollster/client(s)	Date(s) conducted	Sample size	Zema NOVO	Pacheco PSD	Abst. Undec.	Lead
DataTempo/CP2	29 Oct–3 Nov 21	1.402	58,9%	18,8%	22,4%	40,1%

=== Senator ===
Pollster/client(s)	Date(s) conducted	Sample size	Cleitinho PSC	Lopes PT	Silveira PSD	Marcelo PL	Aro PP	Aécio PSDB	Julvan MDB	Salabert PDT	Others	Abst. Undec.	Lead
Instituto Equilíbrio Brasil	5–7 Jul 22	1.460	19,2%	–	6,3%	2,4%	0,6%	8,3%	–	7,2%	10,9% (Note: Coronel Cláudia (PL) with 8,2% and Mateus Simões (NOVO) with 2,7%)	45,1%	8,3%
EXAME/IDEIA	1–6 Jul 22	1.000	2%	6%	8%	1%	3%	14%	–	4%	5,3% (Note: Carlos Melles (PL) with 2%, Paulo Piau (MDB) with 2%, Pastor Altamiro Alves (PTB) with 1%, Sara Azevedo (PSOL) with 0,2% and Gilson Reis (PCdoB) with 0,1%)	58%	6%
Genial/Quaest	2–5 Jul 22	1.480	19%	–	7%	3%	2%	–	–	–	7% (Note: Sara Azevedo (PSOL) with 4% and Paulo Piau (MDB) with 3%)	62%	12%
Genial/Quaest	2–5 Jul 22	1.480	19%	–	10%	3%	4%	–	–	–	–	63%	9%
Genial/Quaest	2–5 Jul 22	1.480	15%	–	35%	16%	10%	–	–	–	(Note: Possible electoral scenario in which the incumbent senator Alexandre Silveira (PSD) would be supported by the former president Lula (PT) and the candidate for the government of Minas Gerais, Alexandre Kalil (PSD). Also in this scenario, the former Minister of Tourism of Brazil, Marcelo Álvaro Antônio (PL) would be supported by the President Jair Bolsonaro and incumbent Senator Carlos Viana, both affiliated to the Liberal Party (PL). The federal deputy Marcelo Aro (PP) would be supported by the incumbent governor Romeu Zema (NOVO) and the state deputy of Minas Gerais, Cleitinho Azevedo wouldn't be supported by anyone.)	24%	19%
Instituto F5 Atualiza Dados	13–16 Jun 22	1.560	12,8%	–	3,8%	5,6%	2,1%	18,5%	–	0,9%	5,9% (Note: Paulo Piau (MDB) with 2,5%; Carlos Melles (PL) with 1,8% and Sara Azevedo (PSOL) with 1,6%)	50,4%	5,7%
DataTempo	27 May–1 Jun 22	2.000	11,6%	–	4,2%	4,8%	1,8%	24,8%	–	–	5,4% (Note: Sara Azevedo (PSOL) with 5,4%)	47,3%	13,2%
Pollster/client(s)	Date(s) conducted	Sample size	Cleitinho PSC	Lopes PT	Silveira PSD	Marcelo PL	Aro PP	Melles DEM	Julvan MDB	Salabert PDT	Others	Abst. Undec.	Lead
Real Time Big Data	27–28 May 22	1.500	12%	–	7%	3%	1%	–	1%	7%	16% (Note: Aécio Neves (PSDB) with 16%)	53%	4%
Real Time Big Data	27–28 May 22	1.500	14%	–	9%	4%	2%	–	2%	7%	–	62%	5%
Paraná Pesquisas	8–13 May 22	1.680	–	8,3%	6,3%	3,9%	2,1%	–	–	5,3%	20,8% (Note: Aécio Neves (PSDB) with 20,8%)	53,3%	12,5%
Paraná Pesquisas	8–13 May 22	1.680	–	9,2%	8,1%	5,6%	4,9%	–	–	–	–	72,2%	1,1%
Quaest/Genial	7–10 May 22	1.480	17%	9%	8%	5%	2%	–	–	–	–	59%	8%
Quaest/Genial	7–10 May 22	1.480	–	–	13%	8%	5%	–	–	–	–	74%	5%
Quaest/Genial	7–10 May 22	1.480	–	12%	–	10%	7%	–	–	–	–	71%	2%
Quaest/Genial	7–10 May 22	1.480	–	10%	10%	8%	5%	–	–	–	–	68%	Tie
31 March 2022	Cleitinho Azevedo leaves Cidadania and decides to join Social Christian Party (PSC).												
Pollster/client(s)	Date(s) conducted	Sample size	Cleitinho Cidadania	Lopes PT	Marcelo PL	Melles DEM	Silveira PSD	Julvan MDB	Salabert PDT	Aro PP	Others	Abst. Undec.	Lead
Itatiata / Instituto Ver	14–17 Apr 22	1.500	14%	10%	4%	–	5%	–	–	3%	–	64%	4%
Quaest/Genial	11–16 Mar 22	1.480	13%	10%	4%	–	8%	1%	6%	2%	–	56%	3%
Quaest/Genial	11–16 Mar 22	1.480	18%	–	7%	–	10%	3%	–	–	–	62%	8%
Quaest/Genial	11–16 Mar 22	1.480	18%	12%	8%	–	–	4%	–	–	–	58%	6%
Real Time Big Data	12–15 Mar 22	1.500	–	13%	6%	–	2%	1%	3%	–	–	75%	5%
F5/EM	14–17 Feb 22	1.560	10,3%	8,3%	3,2%	2,9%	2,7%	2,4%	1,9%	1,3%	–	67%	2%
3 Feb 2022	Antonio Anastasia takes office as a justice of the Federal Court of Accounts of Brazil.												
Pollster/client(s)	Date(s) conducted	Sample size	Anastasia PSD	Cleitinho Cidadania	Lopes PT	Marcelo PL	Melles DEM	Silveira PSD	Julvan MDB	Salabert PDT	Others	Abst. Undec.	Lead
DataTempo/CP2	26 Nov–1 Dec 21	1.404	28,9%	–	7,3%	1,6%	–	2,1%	–	–	9,7% (Note: Vanessa Portugal (PSTU) with 4,6%; Mário Heringer (PDT) with 2,2%; Kaká Menezes (REDE) with 1,6% and Marcelo Aro (PP) with 1,3%)	50,3%	19,2%
Real Time Big Data	21–22 Sep 21	1.000	18%	–	–	2%	–	–	–	–	11% (Note: Rogério Correia (PT) with 6%; Agostinho Patrus (PV) with 4% and Marcelo Aro (PP) with 1%)	69%	7%

== Results ==
=== Governor ===
Candidate	Running mate	Party	Votes	%
Romeu Zema (incumbent)	Mateus Simões	NOVO	6,094,136	56.20
Alexandre Kalil	André Quintão (PT)	PSD	3,805,182	35.09
Carlos Viana	Wanderley Amaro (Republicanos)	PL	783,800	7.23
Marcus Pestana	Paulo Brandt	PSDB	60,637	0.56
Lorene Figueiredo	Ana Azevedo	PSOL	44,898	0.41
Paulo Tristão	Antônio Otávio	PMB	15,774	0.15
Indira Xavier	Edna Gonçalves	UP	15,604	0.14
Renata Regina	Tuani Guimarães	PCB	12,514	0.12
Vanessa Portugal	Jordano Carvalho	PSTU	12,009	0.11
Lourdes Francisco	Sebastião Pessoas	PCO	2,012	
Total			10,844,554	100.00
Valid votes			10,844,554	85.78
Invalid votes			1,089,431	8.62
Blank votes			707,694	5.60
Total votes			12,641,679	100.00
Registered voters/turnout			16,283,828	77.63
NOVO hold				

Popular vote
Zema	56.18%
Kalil	35.08%
Viana	7.23%
Others	1.51%

=== Senator ===
Candidate	Party	Votes	%
Cleiton Azevedo	PSC	4,268,193	41.52
Alexandre Silveira (incumbent)	PSD	3,679,392	35.79
Marcelo Aro	PP	2,025,573	19.70
Sara Azevedo	PSOL	113,304	1.10
Bruno Miranda	PDT	105,650	1.03
Altamiro Alves	PTB	47,018	0.46
Dirlene Marques	PSTU	37,317	0.36
Naomi de Almeida	PCO	3,229	0.03
Total		10,279,676	100.00
Valid votes		10,279,676	81.30
Invalid votes		1,319,017	10.43
Blank votes		1,044,998	8.26
Total votes		12,643,691	100.00
Registered voters/turnout		16,283,828	77.65
PSC gain from PSD			

Popular vote
Azevedo	41.52%
Silveira	35.79%
Aro	19.70%
Others	2.98%

=== Chamber of Deputies ===
Party or alliance		Votes	%	Seats	+/–
Liberal Party		2,383,410	21.32	11	▲10
Brazil of Hope	Workers' Party	1,587,693	14.20	10	▲2
Brazil of Hope	Green Party	160,174	1.43	0	Steady
Brazil of Hope	Communist Party of Brazil	39,658	0.35	0	Steady
Avante		924,208	8.27	5	▲2
PSD		766,629	6.86	4	▲1
Brazil Union		669,076	5.98	3	New
Progressistas		655,458	5.86	3	▲1
Patriota		543,201	4.86	3	▲1
Democratic Labour Party		425,633	3.81	2	Steady
Brazilian Democratic Movement		403,038	3.60	2	▼2
Republicanos		371,939	3.33	2	Steady
Podemos		338,977	3.03	2	▲1
Always Forward	Brazilian Social Democracy Party	314,097	2.81	2	▼3
Always Forward	Cidadania	78,386	0.70	0	Steady
Social Christian Party		258,888	2.32	1	Steady
PSOL REDE Federation	Socialism and Liberty Party	204,915	1.83	1	Steady
PSOL REDE Federation	Sustainability Network	107,345	0.96	0	Steady
Republican Party of the Social Order		185,985	1.66	1	▼1
New Party		185,099	1.66	0	▼2
Solidariedade		181,577	1.62	1	Steady
Brazilian Labour Party		125,334	1.12	0	Steady
Brazilian Socialist Party		110,298	0.99	0	▼3
Party of National Mobilization		84,938	0.76	0	▼1
Brazilian Communist Party		31,514	0.28	0	Steady
Brazilian Labour Renewal Party		19,441	0.17	0	Steady
Agir		6,537	0.06	0	Steady
Christian Democracy		4,808	0.04	0	Steady
United Socialist Workers' Party		4,551	0.04	0	Steady
Popular Unity		4,523	0.04	0	New
Brazilian Woman's Party		3,034	0.03	0	Steady
Workers' Cause Party		734	0.01	0	Steady
Total		11,181,098	100.00	53	–
Valid votes		11,181,098	88.43		
Invalid votes		618,607	4.89		
Blank votes		843,986	6.68		
Total votes		12,643,691	100.00		
Registered voters/turnout		16,289,828	77.62		

=== Legislative Assembly ===
Party or alliance		Votes	%	Seats	+/–
Brazil of Hope	Workers' Party	1,522,760	13.78	12	▲2
Brazil of Hope	Green Party	407,441	3.69	4	▼1
Brazil of Hope	Communist Party of Brazil	115,403	1.04	1	Steady
Liberal Party		1,306,136	11.82	9	▲7
Social Democratic Party		1,143,330	10.35	9	▲5
Progressives		833,221	7.54	6	▲5
Republicans		475,080	4.30	3	Steady
Brazil Union		451,748	4.09	3	New
Forward		449,270	4.07	3	▲1
Social Christian Party		433,134	3.92	3	Steady
New Party		377,651	3.42	2	▼1
Patriot		371,263	3.36	3	▲1
Party of National Mobilization		369,047	3.34	3	▲3
Brazilian Democratic Movement		314,743	2.85	2	▲5
Democratic Labour Party		313,735	2.84	2	Steady
Always Forward	Brazilian Social Democracy Party	299,427	2.71	1	▼6
Always Forward	Citizenship	253,678	2.30	3	▲2
PSOL REDE Federation	Sustainability Network	289,675	2.62	2	▲1
PSOL REDE Federation	Socialism and Liberty Party	136,262	1.23	1	Steady
Brazilian Socialist Party		237,408	2.15	1	Steady
Republican Party of the Social Order		218,897	1.98	1	Steady
Christian Democracy		211,746	1.92	1	Steady
We Can		192,418	1.74	1	▼1
Solidarity		153,241	1.39	1	▼1
Brazilian Labour Party		79,467	0.72	0	▼3
Brazilian Woman's Party		37,832	0.34	0	Steady
Brazilian Labour Renewal Party		29,122	0.26	0	▼1
Brazilian Communist Party		9,675	0.09	0	Steady
Popular Unity		9,228	0.08	0	New
United Socialist Workers' Party		5,815	0.05	0	Steady
Workers' Cause Party		789	0.01	0	Steady
Total		11,048,642	100.00	77	–
Valid votes		11,076,602	87.61		
Invalid votes		636,171	5.03		
Blank votes		930,918	7.36		
Total votes		12,643,691	100.00		
Registered voters/turnout		16,289,828	77.62		
