= Lohanna França =

Brazilian biochemist, professor, and politician

- Lohanna in 2026

Member of the Legislative Assembly of Minas Gerais
- Incumbent
- Assumed office February 1, 2023

City Councillor of Divinópolis
- In office January 1, 2021 – January 30, 2023

Personal details
- Born: Lohanna Souza França Moreira de Oliveira; January 31, 1995 (age 31) Vila Velha, Espírito Santo, Brazil
- Citizenship: Brazilian
- Party: Green Party (2022–present)
- Other political affiliations: Cidadania (2019–2022); PPS (2011–2019)
- Education: Federal University of São João del-Rei
- Website: lohannafranca.com.br

Lohanna Souza França Moreira de Oliveira (born January 31, 1995) is a Brazilian teacher, feminist activist, and politician affiliated with the Green Party (PV). She currently serves as a state deputy for Minas Gerais.

== Biography ==
Lohana was born in Vila Velha, in the interior of Espírito Santo. During his childhood, she lived between Itaúna and Divinópolis, cities in the interior of Minas Gerais, and in his youth she settled in Divinópolis. During her youth, she was active in volunteer groups such as the Rotaract Club, the Movimento Acredito, the student movement, and the youth group at the city’s Catholic church.

She earned her degree in biochemistry from the Federal University of São João del-Rei (UFSJ). She became a chemistry teacher in the city of Divinópolis.

== Politics ==
Lohanna França in 2023.

She entered politics through the RenovaBR think tank. A member of the Cidadania party, she ran for city councilor in Divinópolis. In the 2020 election, she was elected after receiving more than 5,000 votes. In that election, she received the most votes of any candidate in the city and, at age 25, became the youngest city councilor in the city’s history.

In April 2022, she joined the Green Party (PV). That same year, she ran for state representative in Minas Gerais. After receiving more than 67,000 votes, she was elected to the position. With this electoral victory, the Green Party won four seats in the Legislative Legislative Assembly of Minas Gerais (ALMG), one fewer than in the 2018 election.

In 2026, she ran for the office of federal representative from Minas Gerais. After receiving more than 100,000 votes, she was the PV candidate with the most votes.

=== Electoral performance ===
Year	Position	Party	Votes	Result	Ref.
2020	City Councilwoman from Divinópolis	Cidadania	5 462	Elected	
2022	State Deputy from Minas Gerais	PV	67 178	Elected	
2026	Federal representative from Minas Gerais	PV	108 182	Elected	

== Personal life ==
She has been married to lawyer Flavio Zica since 2023. She identifies as Catholic. She is a feminist.
