= Cleitinho Azevedo =

Brazilian politician

Governor-elect of Minas Gerais
- Assuming office 6 January 2027
- Lieutenant: Luís Eduardo Falcão (elect)
- Succeeding: Mateus Simões

Senator for Minas Gerais
- Incumbent
- Assumed office 1 February 2023
- Preceded by: Lael Varella

Member of the Legislative Assembly of Minas Gerais
- In office 1 February 2019 – 1 February 2023
- Constituency: At-large

Member of the Municipal Chamber of Divinópolis
- In office 1 January 2017 – 1 February 2019
- Constituency: At-large

Personal details
- Born: Cleiton Gontijo de Azevedo; 15 April 1982 (age 44) Divinópolis, Minas Gerais, Brazil
- Party: Republicanos (2022–present)
- Other political affiliations: Cidadania (2016–2022); PSC (2022)
- Relatives: Gleidson Azevedo (twin brother)
- Profession: Entrepreneur, musician, politician

Cleiton Gontijo de Azevedo, often referred to as just Cleitinho (born 15 April 1982), is a Brazilian businessman, musician, and politician. He has been a senator from the state of Minas Gerais since 2023. He previously served as a state deputy in Minas Gerais, as well as a councilman in his hometown of Divinópolis. He is currently affiliated with the Republicanos.

Cleitinho's brother is Eduardo Azevedo, who is currently a state deputy in Minas Gerais. In 2016, he was elected as a councilman in Divinópolis in 2016. He was elected as a state deputy as part of Cidadania with 115,492 votes. He left Cidadania in 2022 and became affiliated with the Social Christian Party (PSC) to run for the federal senate. He was elected to the Senate in 2022 with 41.52% of the vote, beating out other major candidates, including incumbent Alexandre Silveira and Marcelo Aro, for the seat.

== Election history ==
Year	Election	Party	Office	Coalition	Partners	Party	Votes	Percent	Result
2016	Municipal Election of Divinópolis	PPS	Councillor	—N/a			3,023	2.62%	Elected
2018	State Elections of Minas Gerais	PPS	State Deputy	Together to Rebuild Minas (PSDB, PPS, DEM, PP, PSD)	—N/a		115,492	1.14%	Elected
2022	State Elections of Minas Gerais	PSC	Senator	—N/a	Alex Diniz	PSC	4,268,193	41.52%	Elected
2022	State Elections of Minas Gerais	PSC	Senator	—N/a	Wander de Souza	PSC	4,268,193	41.52%	Elected
2026	State Elections of Minas Gerais	Republicanos	Governor	Minas Belongs to the People (Republicanos, PODE)	Luís Eduardo Falcão	Republicanos	6,321,590	55.40%	Elected

Political offices
Preceded by Mateus Simões	Governor of Minas Gerais; Taking office 2027	Elect
