= Constitutional Amendment to End the 6x1 Work Schedule =

2026 Brazilian constitutional amendment

- Protest against the 6x1 work scale on the International Workers' Day

Brazilian National Congress
- Citation: EMC 141/2026
- Territorial extent: Brazil
- Passed by: Chamber of Deputies
- Passed: 27 May 2026
- Passed by: Federal Senate
- Passed: 14 October 2026
- Signed by: Davi Alcolumbre, President of the Senate; Hugo Motta, President of the Chamber
- Signed: 16 October 2026

Legislative history

Initiating chamber: Chamber of Deputies
- Bill title: Constitutional Amendment Bill no. 221 of 2019
- Bill citation: PEC 221/2019
- Introduced by: Dep. Reginaldo Lopes (PT-MG)
- Introduced: 11 December 2019
- Committee responsible: PEC 221/19 Special
- First reading: 11 December 2019
- Considered by the PEC 221/19 Special Committee: 27 May 2026
- Voting summary: 34 voted for; 4 voted against
- Third reading: 27 May 2026
- Voting summary: 472 voted for; 22 voted against
- Passed: 27 May 2026
- Voting summary: 461 voted for; 19 voted against

Revising chamber: Federal Senate
- Bill title: Constitutional Amendment Bill no. 221 of 2019
- Bill citation: PEC 221/2019
- Received from the Chamber of Deputies: 28 May 2025
- Committee responsible: Constitution, Justice and Citizenship
- First reading: 21 August 2026
- Considered by the Constitution, Justice and Citizenship Committee: 2 September 2026
- Voting summary: 23 voted for; 4 voted against
- Third reading: 14 October 2026
- Voting summary: 75 voted for; 1 voted against
- Passed: 14 October 2026
- Voting summary: 75 voted for; 1 voted against

Amends
- Constitution of Brazil

Amended by
- Constitutional Amendment Bill no. 8 of 2025

Summary
- Amends Article 7, item XII of the Federal Constitution, reducing the work week to 36 hours over 10 years.

Keywords
- Consolidation of Labor Laws
- Status: Not yet in force

EMC 141/2026, mostly known as Constitutional Amendment to End of 6x1 Work Schedule (Portuguese: PEC do Fim da Escala 6x1), is a constitutional amendment that seeks to reduce the weekly working hours in Brazil, eliminating the 6x1 model (six consecutive days of work followed by one day of rest) and establishing two paid rest days for workers, without salary reduction. It also makes it optional for the two days off to occur on consecutive days in the same week, allowing them to be granted on non-consecutive days.

Historically endorsed by trade union movements, labour centers and left-wing parties, the bill gained strength in the National Congress after an increase of complaints on physical and mental exhaustion of workers subjected to long working times, specially in commerce and services sectors, besides double burden of women. The report passed by the Chamber special committee on 27 May 2026 provides a gradual transition from a 44-hour to a 40-hour work week, maintaining rights such as paid vacations, FGTS and thirteenth salary. In the voting session, political parties historically linked to advocating for a reduction in working hours, such as the Workers' Party (PT) and the Socialism and Liberty Party (PSOL), of which deputies Reginaldo Lopes (PT-MG) and Erika Hilton (PSOL-SP) are authors of the bill, voted in favor of the proposal, while the Liberal Party (PL) cast the largest number of votes against the bill.

During its processing, the bill suffered setbacks and attacks from part of Bolsonarist and right-wing deputies, of which acted to prevent an approval already negotiated in the special committee and to generate political wear and tear around the proposal. Amongst the tactics used by the Liberal Party, was a "counter-bill" for an immediate approval of a four-day workweek, with the intention to create a possible economic crisis in the country. However, such strategies were not succeeded.

Millions of Brazilians, sectors of civil society and artists endorsed the amendment bill, with protests in favor held in many cities of Brazil, specially in the capitals of São Paulo, Rio de Janeiro and Minas Gerais and in cities in the countryside of São Paulo, such as Campinas and Osasco. Following the widely negative reaction from the public and workers' representative bodies, many deputies, specially from Centrão, retreated and removed their endorsements to the counterproposals presented by the opposition.

== History ==
=== Background ===
President Lula giving a speech on International Workers' Day in Vale do Anhangabaú, São Paulo

Protestors against the 6x1 working time in Maceió, Alagoas

Protest against the 6x1 working time in Cinelândia, Rio de Janeiro

President Lula with a cap endorsing the proposal in a meeting with labour unions

Supported by progressive lawmakers and by president Luiz Inácio Lula da Silva cabinet members, the bill became known as one of the main labour issues since 1988 Constitution. Labour unions and left-wing organizations classified the proposal as a "civilizing measure" and a "historical reparation" after decades of working times considered excessive and exploitative. The subject gained national repercussion in 2024, boosted by the "Life Beyond Work Movement" (Movimento Vida Além do Trabalho, VAT), organized by Rio de Janeiro councillor Rick Azevedo (PSOL), who supported changes in the Consolidation of Labor Laws (CLT) and reduction of weekly working hours without reduction in salary.

The bill was filed in the National Congress by deputy Erika Hilton (PSOL-SP), author of PEC 8/2025, which provided the end of the 6x1 working time and the implementation of a 4x3 working time. In parallel, deputy Reginaldo Lopes (PT-MG) already had filed a similar bill, processing in the Chamber since 2019, PEC 221/2019. Later, both texts were attached and began to be processed jointly in the Chamber of Deputies. According to Hilton, the bill process represented a "victory for social movements" and the popular pressure surrounding the reduction of the work week. The deputy affirmed that the bill sought to discuss an "obsolete working structure", while labour movements endorsed the end of 6x1 work week as a measure to promote mental health, weekly rest and family life of Brazilian workers.

During the processing of the bill, trade and labour unions organized protests supporting the proposal, while the federal government participated in the negotiations to draft a consensus text between the Chamber and the Executive branch. According to the National Confederation of Financial Sector Workers (Contraf-CUT), the report presented by deputy Léo Prates (Republicanos-BA) fixed "non-negotiable" issues by the government and social movements, such as the reduction of week hours from 44 to 40 hours, the end of 6x1 working time and full maintenance of wages.

=== Chamber of Deputies ===
Deputies Reginaldo Lopes and Erika Hilton during a session of the bill's special committee.

Initially introduced in 2019 by deputy Reginaldo Lopes, the first bill, PEC 221/2019, sought to reduce the workload to 36 hours per week, after a 10-year transition. The bill stalled in the Chamber for years, but the issue gained traction following the creation of a second bill, PEC 8/2025, introduced by deputy Erika Hilton, seeking to institute a 4x3 system (four working days and three rest days). During the processing in the Chamber, both bills were merged into a substitute bill authored by deputy Léo Prates, the rapporteur, with the first technically being approved (with the text amended) and the second being archived.

On the other side, right-wing and far-right deputies began to campaign against the proposal, claiming possible economic impacts, rising costs for employers and risks to the labour market. These lawmakers also introduced amendments that could delay the reduction of the weekly working hours up to 10 years, besides expanding mechanisms for employer flexibility.

Progressive deputies using shirts reading "Fim da escala 6x1"

During the processing of the bill, Liberal Party lawmakers – party which already tried to block another bill introduced by president Lula da Silva to expand the income tax exemption bracket for those earning up to R$ 5,000, passed in 2025. – introduced an alternative proposal for a 4x3 working time, effective immediately, aiming to embarrass the federal government, block the approval of the main bill in the special committee and generating political wear and tear around the proposal. The alternative bill, considered "irresponsible" by Brazil Union and Progressistas, was rejected by the House.

Deputies celebrate the passing of the bill in Ulysses Guimarães plenary chamber.

On 27 May 2026, the bill passed on the Chamber Special Committee by 34 votes to 4; only Liberal (PL) and New Party (NOVO) members voted against. On the same day, the bill was tabled on the plenary chamber, which needed 308 votes to pass in two ballots. On the first ballot, the voting was 472 to 22; on the second ballot, 461 to 19. Therefore, the bill proceeded for a Senate review.

One of the deputies speaking in the parlor, Pastor Sargento Isidório (Avante-BA), made an unusual comment: holding a Bible, he celebrated that workers will have more time to "have sex in peace and with more tranquility".

==== Plenary ====
Held in two ballots, the bill passed in a first ballot by 472 votes in favor and 22 against. There were 18 absent deputies and one obstruction. On the second ballot, it passed by 461 in favor and 19 against, with 33 absences.

Voting; Chamber of Deputies; Approval of PEC 221/2019
First ballot →	27 May 2026	Second ballot →	27 May 2026
Required majority →	308 out of 513	Required majority →	308 out of 513
Yes: • PL (83); • PT (65); • PSD (47); • UNIÃO (46); • PP (42); • Republicanos (41); • MDB (32); • PODE (27); • PSB (17); • PSDB (17); • PSOL (12); • PCdoB (11); • PDT (8); • PV (6); • Solidariedade (6); • Avante (5); • REDE (4); • PRD (2); • Cidadania (1)	472 / 513	Yes: • PL (81); • PT (65); • UNIÃO (47); • PSD (41); • PP (40); • Republicanos (39); • MDB (33); • PODE (27); • PSB (16); • PSDB (16); • PSOL (12); • PCdoB (11); • PDT (8); • PV (6); • Solidariedade (6); • Avante (5); • REDE (4); • PRD (2); • Cidadania (1)	461 / 513
No: • PL (11); • NOVO (4); • MDB (2); • UNIÃO (2); • Missão (1); • PP (1); • PSD (1)	22 / 513	No: • PL (9); • NOVO (4); • MDB (2); • Missão (1); • PP (1); • PSD (1); • UNIÃO (1)	19 / 513
Absents: • MDB (4); • PP (4); • PL (3); • Republicanos (2); • UNIÃO (2); • Cidadania (1); • PDT (1); • PSDB (1)	18 / 513	Absents: • PL (7); • PP (6); • PSD (6); • Republicanos (4); • MDB (3); • PSDB (2); • UNIÃO (2); • Cidadania (1); • NOVO (1); • PSB (1)	33 / 513
Obstruction: • NOVO (1)	1 / 513	Obstruction	0 / 513

==== Aftermath ====
After the bill passed the Chamber, the House President Hugo Motta (Republicanos-PB) stated that the support of president Luiz Inácio Lula da Silva was essential for the bill's approval. According to Motta, the coordination between the federal government and its allied base and party leaders helped consolidate sufficient political support for the bill's approval in the Chamber of Deputies.

I'm very honored and happy to preside over the Chamber of Deputies in this historic moment when the Brazilian Parliament is delivering to the country a reform focused on people's lives. We debated, we dialogued, we disagreed, and we built possible consensuses. I also note that President Lula's support in this journey was essential.

— Hugo Motta

He added that reducing working hours is "promoting health":

History shows us that civilization advances have already faced resistance. This was the case when the decision was made to create the Work Booklet. It was also the case when the country adopted the end of slavery; opponents said the country couldn't handle it. But Brazil opted for progress, a result of our political decisions.

Therefore, reducing working hours is not just about reorganizing schedules. It's a structural measure to promote health. It's a public policy.

Reducing working hours is not the villain of productivity. We need to recognize a reality: Brazil is among the countries with the longest working hours in the world. At the same time, it has lived with stagnant productivity for decades. This shows that productivity cannot continue to be measure solely by the number of hours worked.

— Hugo Motta

In turn, President Lula da Silva said that ending the 6x1 work schedule is "a civilizational achievement", promising to work on the political coordination to get the proposal approved by the Senate.

More than just adding hours to the clock, we are giving workers back the right to spend time with their families. To rest. To life beyond work. The two days off per week mean more time to study, have fun, take care of their health, and watch their children grow up. It is a victory above all for women who, historically and unjustly, face longer and unequal working hours. A measure that was only possible thanks to the immense mobilization of society.

— Luiz Inácio Lula da Silva

=== Senate ===
==== Plenary ====
Voting; Federal Senate; Approval of PEC 221/2019
First ballot →	14 October 2026	Second ballot →	14 October 2026
Required majority →	49 out of 81	Required majority →	49 out of 81
Yes: • PSD (14); • PL (12); • MDB (9); • PT (9); • PP (7); • PSB (7); • Republicanos (5); • PSDB (4); • PODE (3); • UNIÃO (2); • Avante (1); • PDT (1); • No party (1)	75 / 81	Yes: • PSD (14); • PL (12); • MDB (9); • PT (9); • PP (7); • PSB (7); • Republicanos (5); • PSDB (4); • PODE (3); • UNIÃO (2); • Avante (1); • PDT (1); • No party (1)	75 / 81
No: • Republicanos (1)	1 / 81	No: • Republicanos (1)	1 / 81
Absents: • PL (3); • PP (1)	4 / 81	Absents: • PL (3); • PP (1)	4 / 81
Not voting: • UNIÃO (1)	1 / 81	Not voting: • UNIÃO (1)	1 / 81

== See also ==
- Constitutional Amendment of the Public Expenditure Cap
- Gig worker
