= Romeu Zema =

Brazilian businessman and politician (born 1964)

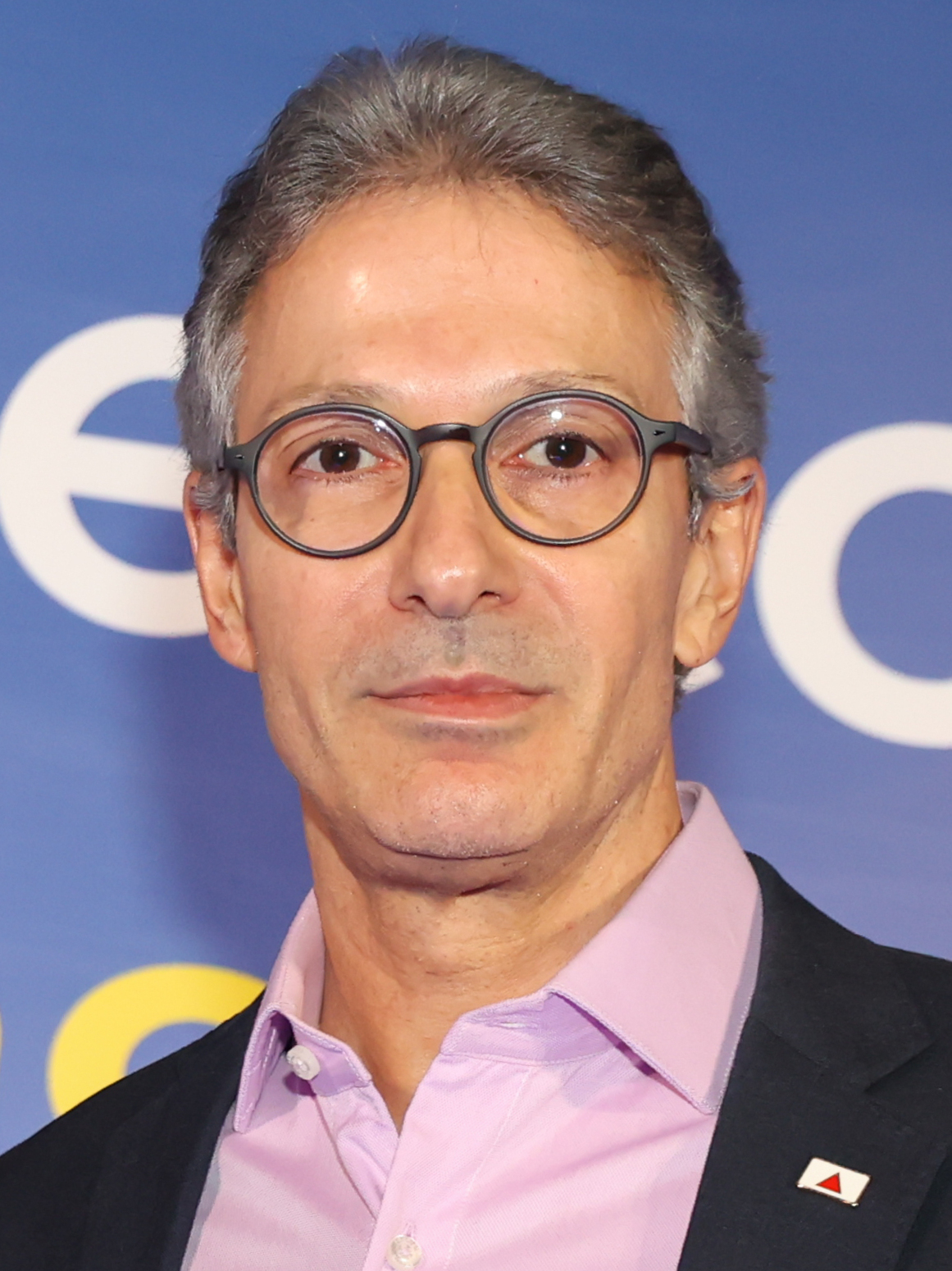
- Zema in 2025

Governor of Minas Gerais
- In office 1 January 2019 – 22 March 2026
- Vice Governor: Paulo Brant (2019–2023); Mateus Simões (2023-2026)
- Preceded by: Fernando Pimentel
- Succeeded by: Mateus Simões

Personal details
- Born: 28 October 1964 (age 61) Araxá, Minas Gerais, Brazil
- Citizenship: Brazil; Italy
- Party: NOVO (since 2018)
- Other political affiliations: PR (2000–2018)
- Spouse: Ivana Scarpellini (divorced)
- Children: 2
- Education: Getúlio Vargas Foundation

Romeu Zema Neto (born 28 October 1964) is a Brazilian businessman, administrator, and politician affiliated with the NOVO party. The Governor of the state of Minas Gerais until he resigned to run for the presidency, Zema served as the head of the Zema Group, an industrial conglomerate, from 1990 to 2016. First elected in 2018, he won 42.73% of the valid votes, qualifying for a second round against Antônio Anastasia. Winning with 72.80% of the votes, he was inaugurated in 2019.

In 2022, he won a decisive re-election against sports commentator and mayor of Belo Horizonte, Alexandre Kalil, with 56.18% in the first round. Zema has been touted by some as a possible presidential candidate for the 2026 Brazilian presidential election, given his alliance with Jair Bolsonaro in the 2018 and 2022 Brazilian presidential elections.

He is also considered one of the fiercest critics of current president Luiz Inácio Lula da Silva, as he has accused Lula of harming and sabotaging Minas Gerais on several occasions, which has led to public clashes between the two, with accusations being exchanged on both sides.

The political views of Zema have been described as economically liberal and politically a pragmatic conservative.

== Business career ==
Zema was born in Araxá, Minas Gerais, to Romeu Zema Neto and Maria Lúcia Zema. His paternal great-grandfather, Domenico Zema, was an Italian immigrant from Reggio Calabria. Zema lived in considerable wealth due to the Zema Group, a conglomerate set up by his Italian great-grandfather. He worked as a gas station attendant, clerk, stock clerk, cashier, buyer, seller, marketing analyst, commercial analyst and manager at various points in his life. After 26 years at the head of the company, Zema stepped down in 2016. Zema has a degree from the Getúlio Vargas Foundation in business administration.

== 2018 election ==
=== First round ===
Map of the first round results (Zema in orange)

Zema was a member of the Liberal Party for all of his political affiliation but changed to run for NOVO in the 2018 Minas Gerais gubernatorial election. He polled low, given NOVO's relatively low profile, initially with 3%, tying with the REDE candidate. His main opponents in PSDB and incumbent governor Fernando Pimentel, of the Worker's Party, held 10 point leads. However, Zema began to gain traction.

In the closing remarks of the Globo debate, Romeu Zema stated that "those who want change, of course, can vote for the different candidates, which are Amoêdo and Bolsonaro." NOVO's national directory saw this statement as partisan infidelity on the part of Zema, because of his defense of the Bolsonaro campaign. However, the state directorate put this as a misunderstanding, highlighting the party's inexperience in matters of political relevance, such as large-scale debates. Some analysts attributed Romeu Zema's unexpected success in the first round to this statement. Romeu Zema officially declared support for Jair Bolsonaro during the campaign in the second round, a factor that led him to suffer criticism from the population, being booed and called an "opportunist" when participating in a campaign act in favor of Bolsonaro. On 7 October 2018, the first round of the general elections was held in Brazil, and Romeu Zema reached the mark of 42.73% of valid votes against 29.06% for Antônio Anastasia and 23.12% for Fernando Pimentel.

=== Second round ===
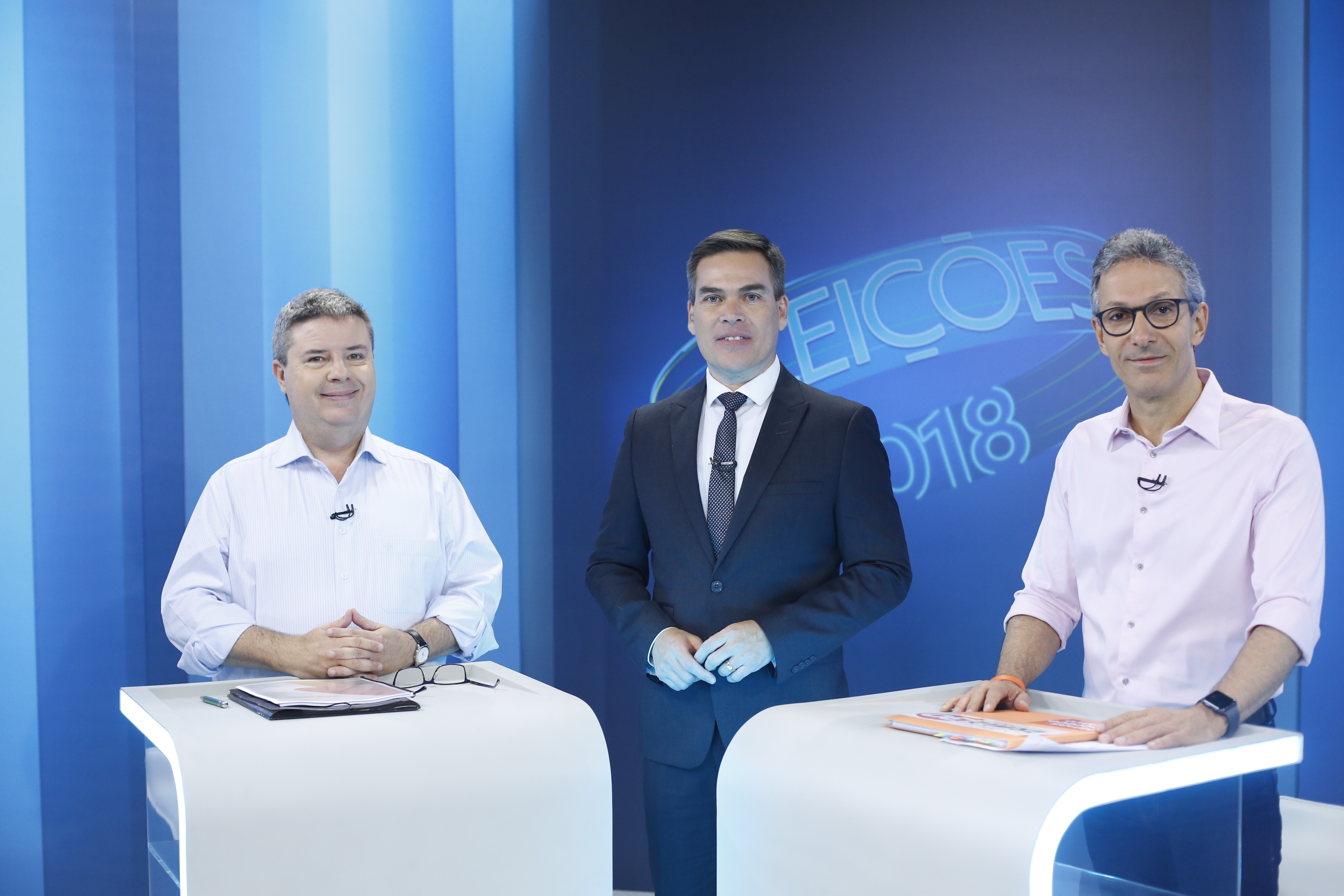
Antônio Anastasia (PSDB) and Zema in the second round Debate on TV Globo

In the second round of the elections, Zema received the support of João Batista dos Mares Guia (REDE). PSL, the party of presidential candidate Jair Bolsonaro, decided not to support the candidacy of Romeu Zema in Minas Gerais. After being asked about accepting support from governor Fernando Pimentel, Zema initially stated that he would not refuse the defeated governor's support as long as he did not ask for secretariats in return. On social media, Antônio Anastasia criticized Zema's position stating that "he wanted PT on his side", even though the Workers' Party candidate was not part of the second round of the election. On social media, Zema said that Anatasia's video was "fake news" and that he would not make a deal with PT. Later, Pimentel and his party declared neutrality in the second round.

Zema was elected in the second round of the 2018 elections as the 39th Governor of Minas Gerais, being driven by the search for renewal in politics and the anti-PT movement, mixed with Bolsonaro's growth in the 2018 elections. Some analysts pointed out that Zema's victory in the elections was the result of a polarized political attrition between PT and PSDB, responsible for the state for the last 16 years. In this sense, Zema would have taken advantage of the wave of renewal and the population's will to change in the face of the economic crises of the period.

== First term ==
=== Inauguration ===
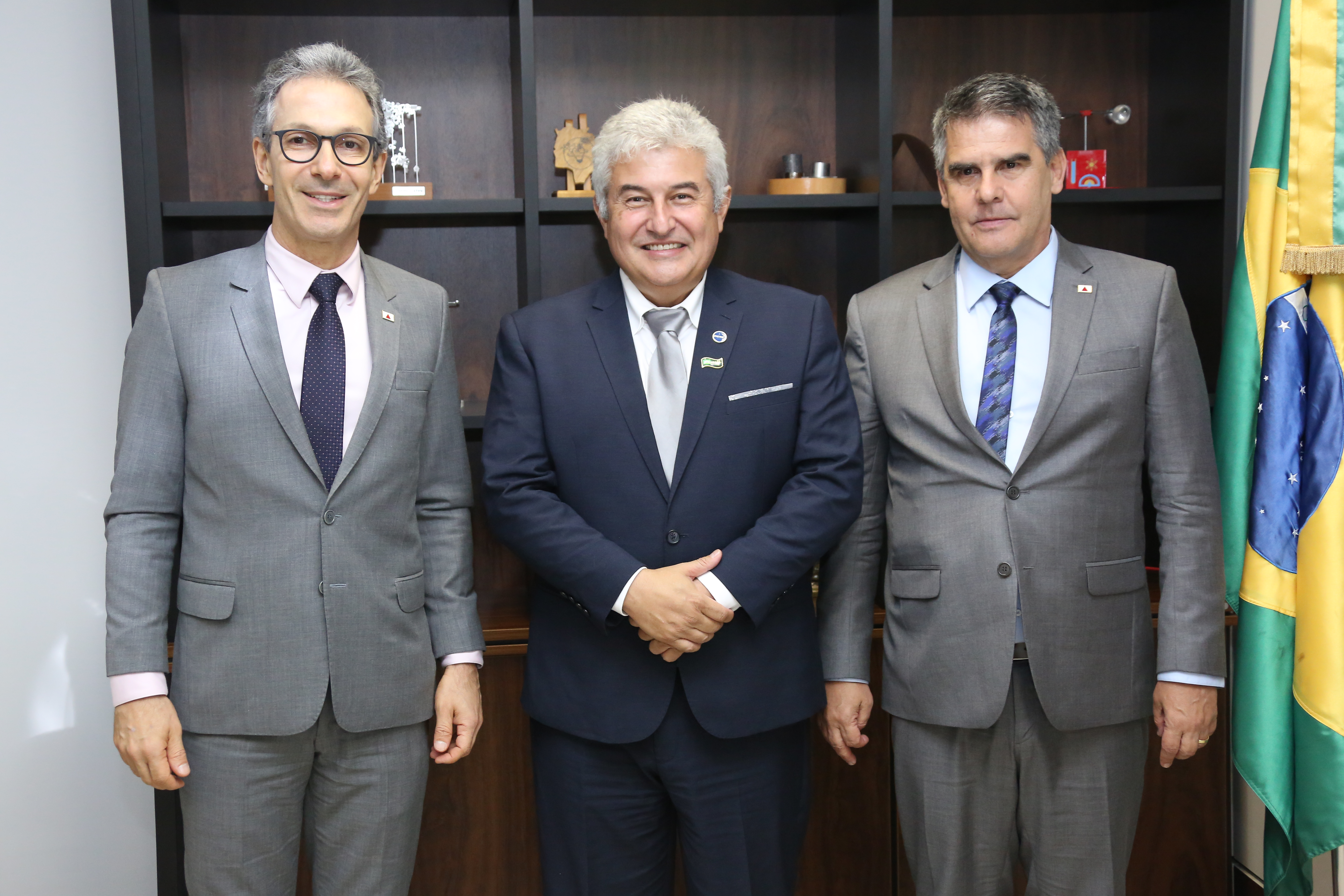
Zema with his vice-governor Paulo Brant and Marcos Pontes, Minister of Science

Zema was inaugurated on 19 December 2018, along with vice governor Paulo Brant (elected for NOVO and later changed to PSDB), an engineering professor, in the Palácio das Artes in Belo Horizonte. The ceremony also installed two senators elected in the same elections, Carlos Viana (elected for PHS and later changed to PL) and Rodrigo Pacheco (DEM), and the 77 state deputies elected in the same election. Zema did not attend Jair Bolsonaro's inauguration, even though he had various forms of transportation at his disposal, largely bough in his predecessor term. Zema had heavily campaigned against what he deemed "frivolous government spending" like the transportation in the election.

=== Government spending ===
Zema had campaigned on cutting government spending and returning taxes to voters. He struggled however, because his party only had 5 state deputies.

==== Secretariat overhaul ====
After taking office, Zema sought to approve the new organization of the Minas Gerais' secretariat that would reduce the number of secretariats from 21 to 12 and eliminate 3,600 commissioned positions, stating that he would save 1 billion reais during his 4 years in government. After 4 months of negotiations, in May, the reform was approved by the Legislative Assembly of Minas Gerais, but Zema vetoed the ban on "jetons", something that increased the salaries of state secretaries that he had criticized in the electoral campaign; defending his change of opinion, Zema argued that "after verifying the effective reality of the state, he attested to its usefulness".

==== Civil servant spending ====
In 2020, due to pressure from the Military Police of Minas Gerais, Zema sent a bill that gave a 41% salary readjustment for public security servants in 3 years, but PT's parliamentary bench was successful in expanding the readjustment for all employees, something that would significantly increase the state's public deficit. After approval by the assembly, Zema almost entirely vetoed the text, maintaining the 13% readjustment only for public security servants. Zema suffered harsh criticism for his performance, with the media commenting that it would be the "biggest political crisis of the government", the national NOVO recommending the complete veto of the project, the government secretary Olavo Bilac Pinto Neto asked for his resignation due to considering the government's articulation unfeasible, and vice governor Paulo Brant announcing his switch from NOVO to PSDB for considering that the party had "chosen to remain on the sidelines of coalitions" rather than its ideals.

==== Pension reform ====
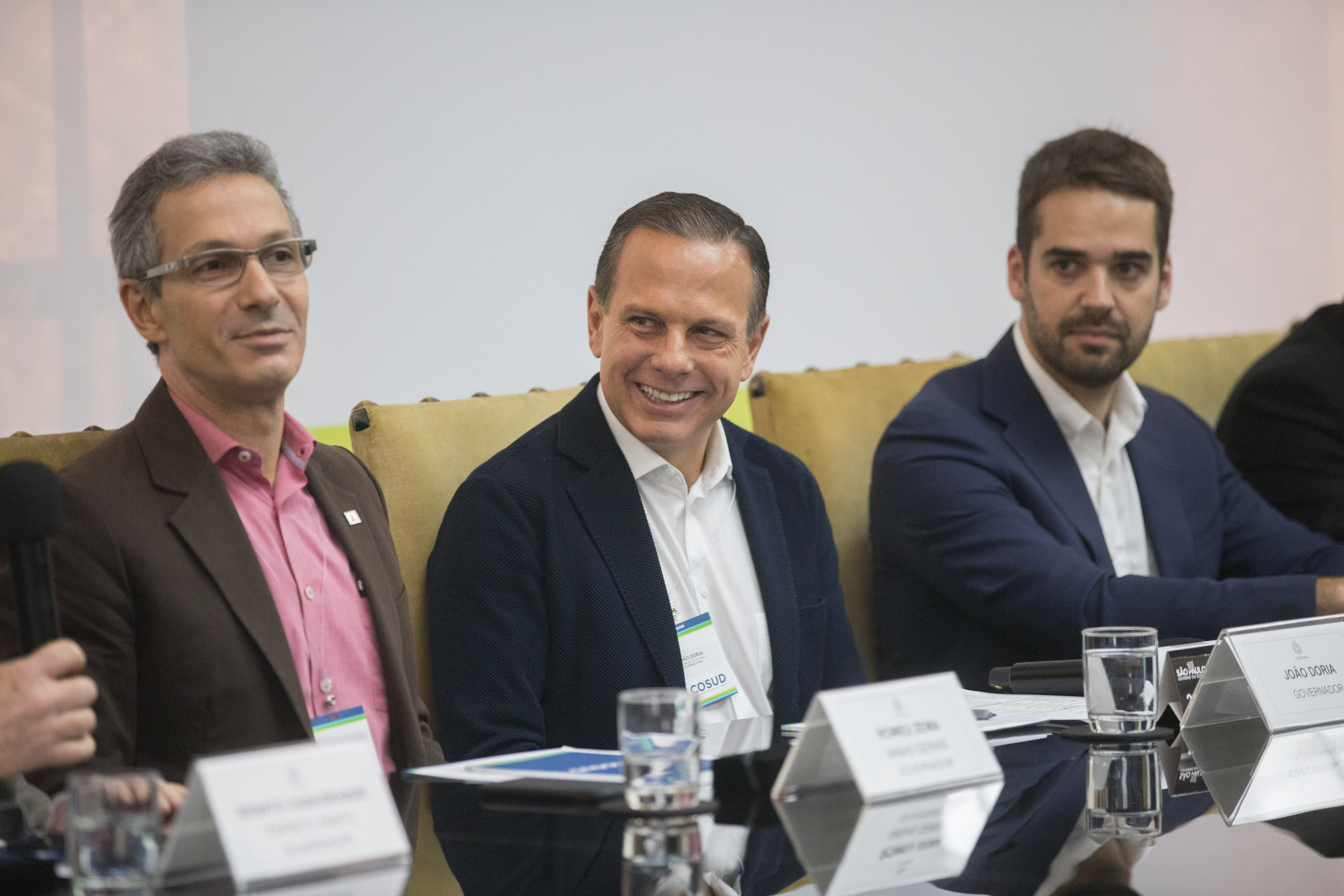
Zema with governors João Doria and Eduardo Leite (both PSDB) at an infrastructure integration conference in 2019

Still in 2020, even after the crises left by the readjustment of public security servants' salary and in the face of the COVID-19 pandemic, the Zema government had the goal of approving the reform of the state pension, with the aim of improving, in the long term, the situation of public accounts in Minas Gerais; the state has one of the worst fiscal deficits in the country. For this, Zema made some changes in his political allies, passing Igor Eto, who was the Secretary-General to the Secretary of Government, and bringing Mateus Simões to the Secretary-General of the State, who was until then City Councilor of Belo Horizonte. Both Mateus Simões and Igor Eto are members of NOVO. Governor Zema also brought in a new government leader, state deputy Raul Belém (PSC). Despite the original proposal sent by the government having been modified by the Legislative Assembly, the Zema government was successful in passing the pension reform with a minimum age of 65 for men and 62 for women.

=== COVID-19 ===
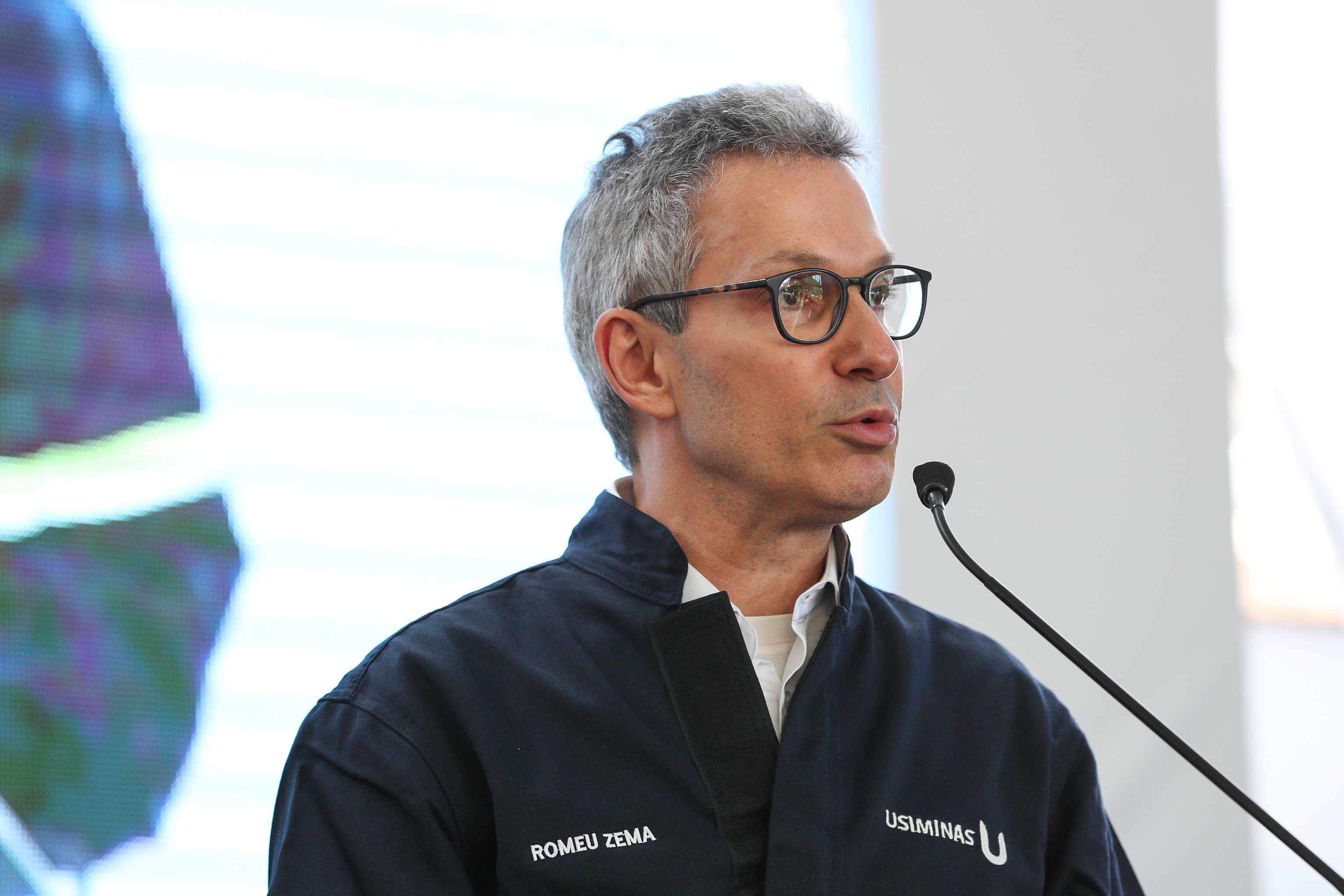
Zema on a speech during a visit to a Usiminas factory in Ipatinga, in August 2020

After the advent of the COVID-19 pandemic, Zema issued lockdown orders that were criticised by NOVO's national directory, who claimed that the measures "negatively affected business".

In later 2020, the underreporting of COVID cases in Minas Gerais was criticized by the press. Zema stated that tests for COVID-19 were "just to satisfy the curiosity of researchers, while not assisting in public health". Despite the presence of underreporting, this was a trend throughout Brazil due to an increase in cases of Acute Respiratory Syndrome (SARS). In September 2020, Minas Gerais was considered the state with the lowest rate of deaths per inhabitant in Brazil.

In 2021 it was reported that Zema's government was under investigation by Augusto Aras, the Attorney General of Brazil, for its handling of state PPE purchases that may have benefited certain companies rather than achieving the lowest price. Zema denied any wrongdoing.

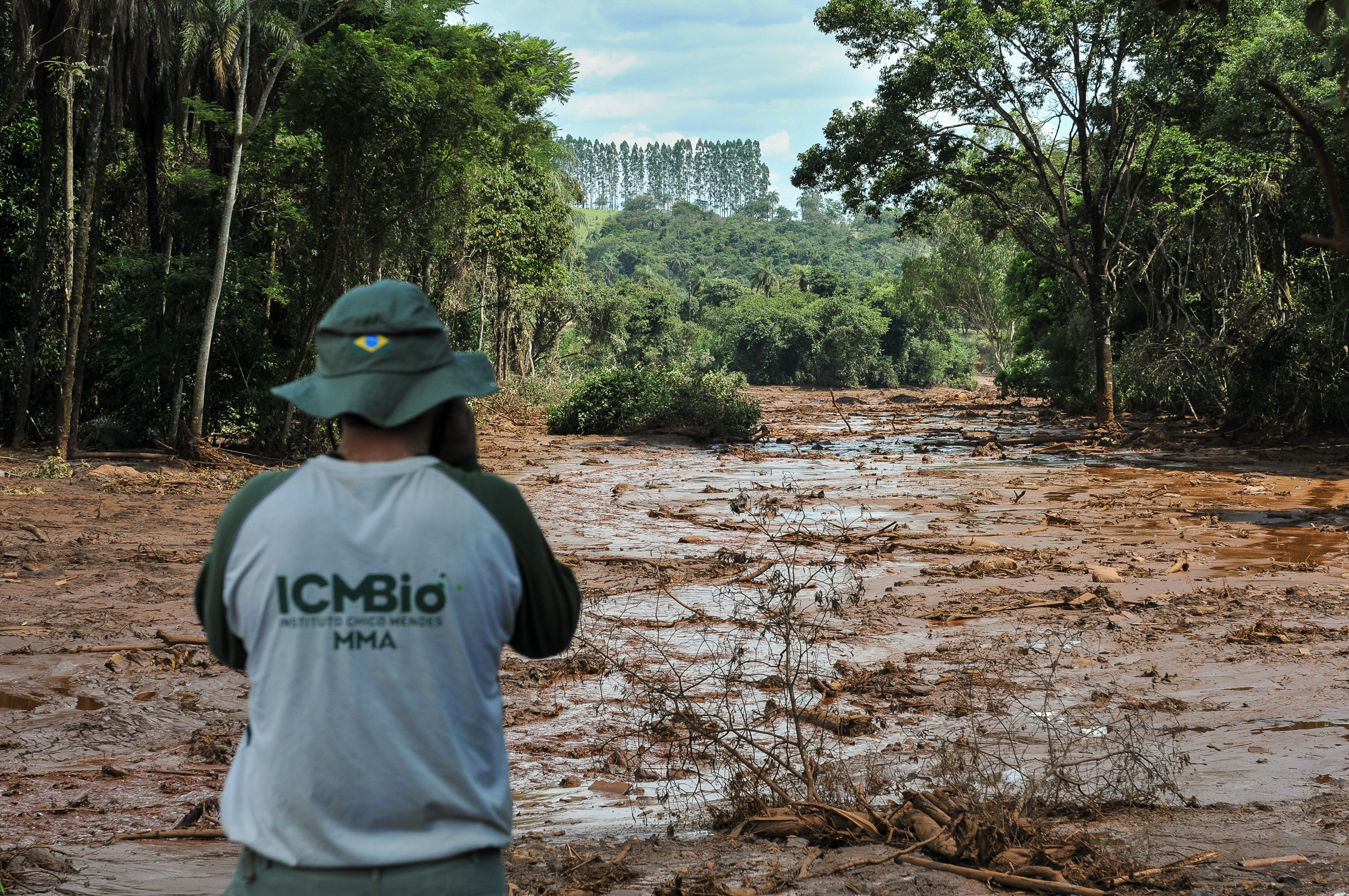
Damage after the collapse of the Brumadinho Dam in 2019

=== Response to the Brumadinho dam disaster ===
On 25 January 2019, a dam operated by Vale S.A. in the municipality of Brumadinho collapsed, killing at least 259 people.

In 2021, the Zema government closed an agreement with Vale S.A. for the damage caused by the dam's rupture, in which the company will pay the State 37.68 billion reais; the money was set to be used in infrastructure works for the affected region. The Movement of People Affected by Dams organized a protest against the agreement, which the group considered unfair, while other actors welcomed the speed of the process.

== 2022 election ==
=== Campaign ===
==== Platform ====
Before the election, Zema Released the following platform.

- Construction and operation of regional hospitals through concession and public-private partnerships
- Expansion of the free offer of technical and integral education courses
- Reform of state schools, with the acquisition of equipment and furniture
- Integration actions between the police and integration of public security information bases
- Expansion of the digital duty to ensure full-time police assistance
- Expansion of concession programs and public-private partnerships, including for the operation of highways, airports and metropolitan transport, and privatization of state-owned companies
- Creation of a state fund for the granting of credits to family farmers
- Incentives for clean energy and the use of non-fossil fuels
- Expansion of the concessions program for managing parks and conservation units
- Providing vocational education courses for youth and adults in poverty
- Granting of credit, paid for by the state, to cover urgent housing demands

==== Victory ====
Zema retained high levels of popularity throughout his first term, never dipping below 40% while much of the population. This led to a tough challenge that his two main opponents Alexandre Kalil and Carlos Viana failed to meet.

Zema only attended some of the debates and pointed to differing forms of misinformation in his campaign while maintaining a form of neutrality in the first round of the presidential elections, barely interacting with his party's nominee Felipe D'Avila, given one of his opponents was from Bolsonaro's party.

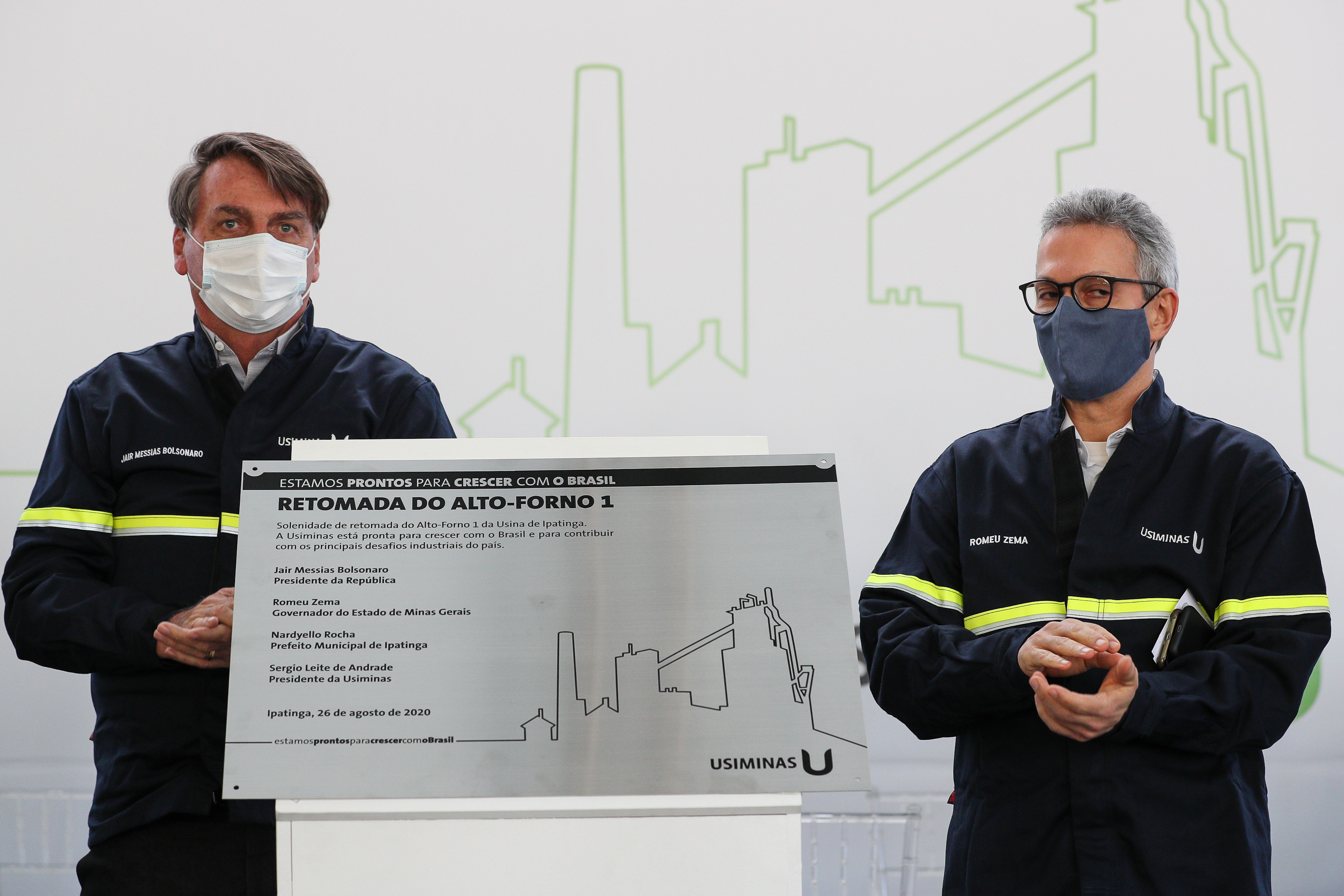
Zema with Bolsonaro at the Usiminas factory in Ipatinga in 2020

Kalil's alliance with the PT, did little to sway Lulazema voters, who split their ballots between the right and left.

Zema was reelected in the first round, avoiding a distracting second round, but failed to achieve the landslide he had achieved in 2018, winning 56.18% of the vote, for the first time forming a coalition for his re-election.

=== Support for Bolsonaro ===
While Zema officially supported Felipe D'Avila, his party's nominee in the first round, he made no secret his support for Bolsonaro in the second, endorsing him just days after the first vote.

While he promised to corral support, along with Claudio Castro, he seemed to be making lackluster efforts, more trying to build a national profile in 2026. While he got some mayors, he has already begun distancing himself according to some, who think that Zema expects Bolsonaro to lose.

== Controversies ==
=== Comments on domestic violence ===
On March 9, 2020, during the launch of a state government program to support victims of domestic violence, Zema referred to domestic violence as “a natural instinct of human beings.”

=== Comments on Brazil's regions ===
On August 6, 2023, Zema discussed the divide between Brazil's North and Northeast with its South, Southeast, and West with the newspaper O Estado de S. Paulo. In the interview, Zema said:

Other regions of Brazil, with states that are much smaller in terms of economy and population, unite and manage to vote and approve a series of projects in Brasília. And we, who represent 56% of Brazilians, but who are always on our own, looking only your backyard, we lost. It was clear in this tax reform that we have already started to show our weight ... We also need social actions. So will the South and Southeast keep contributing far more than they receive in return? This cannot be intensified, year by year, decade by decade. If not, you will fall into that story, the rural producer who only starts giving good treatment to the cows that produce little and leaves aside those that are producing a lot. Soon the ones that produce a lot will start to demand the same treatment. It is necessary to treat everyone the same way.

— Romeu Zema, O Estado de S.Paulo

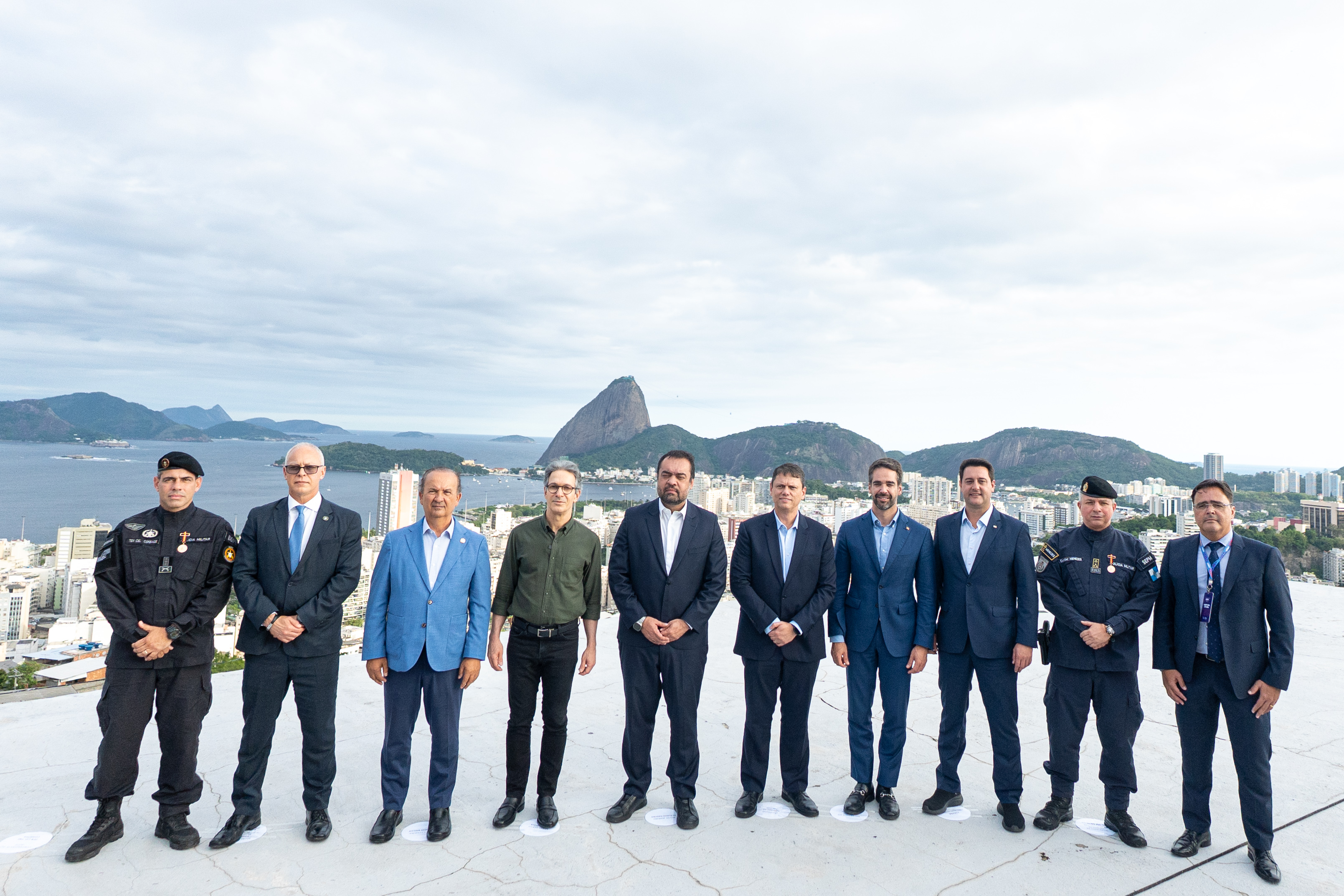
Zema together with BOPE-RJ members and Eduardo Leite, Tarcísio de Freitas, Cláudio Castro, Jorginho Mello and Ratinho Júnior, governors of the Southeast and South regions

Zema was denounced by left-wing politicians across Brazil and even by allies from the Northeast. Gilson Machado, a minister in the Bolsonaro cabinet, said that he "vehemently repudiate[s] any speech that even ventilates the separation of our country."

Marina Silva, the Minister of the Environment said that "without the Amazon, there is no way to have agriculture, there is no way to have industry, there is no way for Brazil to even have life in the South, Southeast and Midwest, because science says it would be a desert like the Atacama or Sahara deserts. Therefore, it is not a matter of quantity in terms of population weight, it is a matter of working with the principle of environmental justice and the GDP of the ecosystem services that are generated by this region."

Others took a stronger stance, like Flávio Dino, the Minister of Justice, who said that Zema is "a traitor to the Constitution [and thus] is a traitor to the homeland."

Other politicians like Eduardo Leite, the Governor of Rio Grande do Sul, initially supported Zema, who after critiscm stated "We will all be stronger the more we are one Brazil. I do not believe that Governor Zema has said anything different from that. If he said it, he does not represent me. We never thought until today that the states of the North and Northeast had united against the other states of the country. On the contrary, the union of these states around the agenda that is of common interest to them served as a inspiration so that we can finally do the same. It has nothing to do with a front of States against States or region against region."

Zema himself said after the outcry that "the union of the South and Southeast will never be to diminish other regions. It is not to be against anyone, but in favor of joining efforts. Dialogue and management are fundamental for the country to have more opportunities. The distortion of facts causes division, but the strength of the Brazil is at work in unity."

=== Alleged government impropriety ===
As part of its lawsuit calling for the invalidation of Zema's candidacy, the Brazilian Woman's Party accused Zema of using the government secretariat to invite the party to join his electoral coalition.

Charles Soares de Sousa, the Zema-appointed superintendent of the Minas Gerais Supram, intervened to cancel a fine against Gute Schit, a mining company linked to a consulting firm Sousa had provided services for.

=== Child labor ===
On May 1, 2026, Zema argued that children should be able to work in Brazil. Brazilian law prohibits child labor work for those under 16 years of age.

== Personal life ==
Zema was married to Ivana Scarpellini and had two children, Catharina and Domenico. They are divorced.

Romeu Zema also has Italian citizenship, however, in 2019, his Italian passport was revoked amid an investigation that revealed fraud in the issuance of documents by several Brazilians. Finally, the citizenship, having been finalized and reapproved, was granted, amid criticisms of dual loyalties.

== Election history ==
| Year | Election | Party | Office | Coalition | Partners | Party | Votes | Percent | Result |
|---|---|---|---|---|---|---|---|---|---|
| 2018 | State Elections of Minas Gerais | NOVO | Governor | —N/a | Paulo Brant | NOVO | 4,138,967 | 42.73% | Runoff |
| 2018 | State Elections of Minas Gerais | NOVO | Governor | —N/a | Paulo Brant | NOVO | 6,963,806 | 71.80% | Elected |
| 2022 | State Elections of Minas Gerais | NOVO | Governor | Minas on the Tracks (NOVO, Avante, PP, SD, PODE, Patriota, PMN, MDB, DC, Agir) | Mateus Simões | NOVO | 6,094,136 | 56.20% | Elected |

Political offices
| Preceded by Fernando Pimentel | Governor of Minas Gerais; 2019−2026 | Succeeded by Mateus Simões |
