= Marcelo Aro =

Brazilian politician (born 1987)

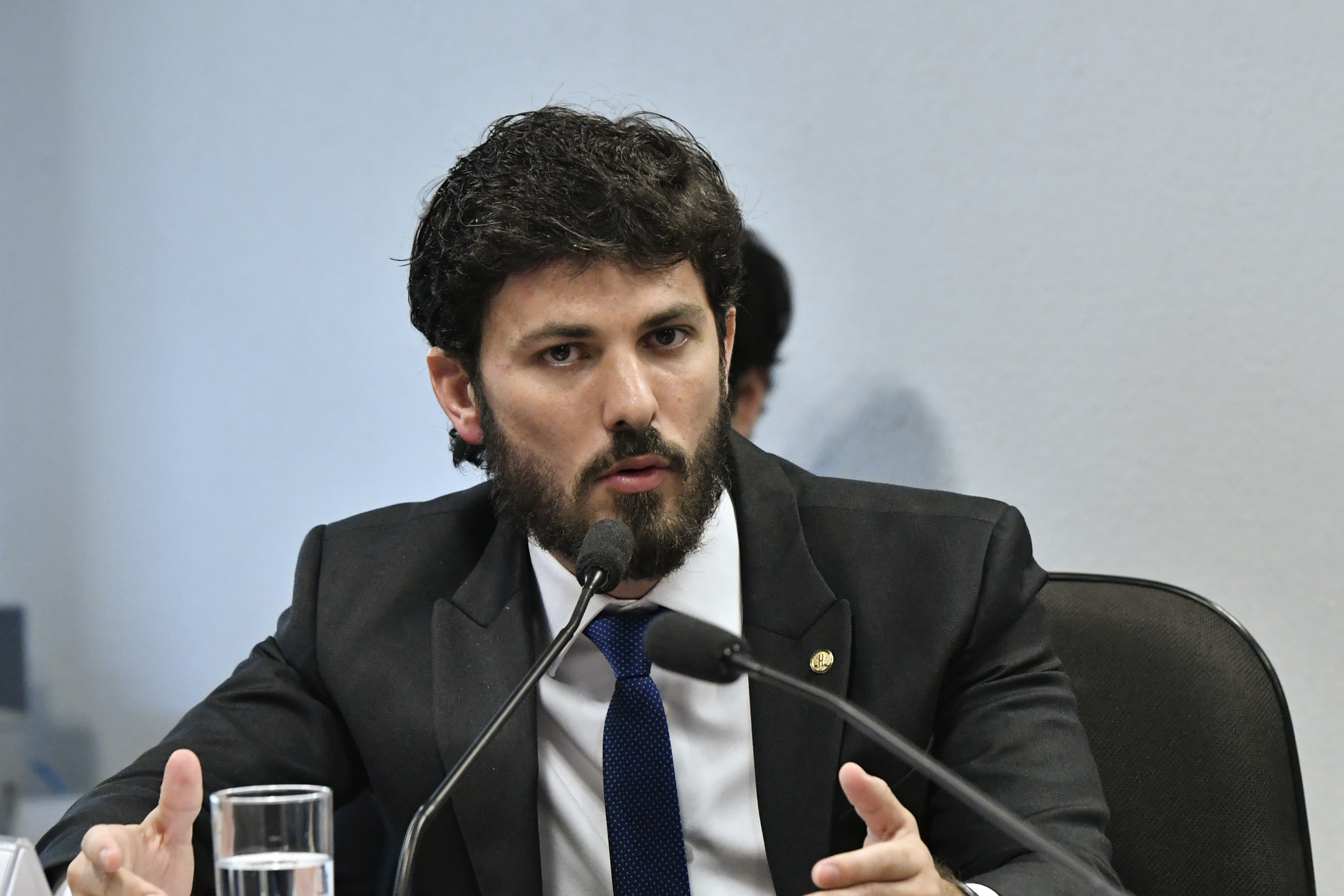
- Aro in 2019

Member of the Chamber of Deputies
- In office 1 February 2015 – 1 February 2023
- Constituency: Minas Gerais

Personal details
- Born: Marcelo Guilherme de Aro Ferreira; 12 June 1987 (age 38) Belo Horizonte, Minas Gerais, Brazil
- Party: PP (since 2019)
- Other political affiliations: PHS (2010–2018)
- Occupation: Journalist, lawyer

Marcelo Guilherme de Aro Ferreira (born 12 June 1987) better known as simply Marcelo Aro is a Brazilian politician and journalist. He has spent his political career representing Minas Gerais, having served as state representative since 2015.

== Personal life ==
Aro was born to Jose Guilherme Ferreira Filho and Marli Aparecida de Aro. Prior to becoming a politician Aro worked as a journalist.

== Political career ==
At the age of just 25, Aro was voted into the city council of his home city with 9,412 in the 2012 local election. In the 2014 Brazilian general election, Aro was elected to the federal chamber of deputies with .

Aro voted in favor of the impeachment motion of then-president Dilma Rousseff. Aro would vote against a similar corruption investigation into Rousseff's successor Michel Temer, and he voted in favor of the 2017 Brazilian labor reforms.

In January 2018 Aro became the president of the Humanist Party of Solidarity. After the 2018 Brazilian general election however the Humanist party failed to win enough seats to secure funding, and subsequently merged with the Podemos party. In January of the following year Aro joined the Progressive party. He ran for senator in 2022, but was beaten by Cleitinho Azevedo.
