= Gleidson Azevedo =

Brazilian politician (born 1982)

- Azevedo in 2024

Member of the Chamber of Deputies
- Incumbent
- Assumed office 1 February 2027
- Constituency: Minas Gerais

Personal details
- Born: 15 April 1982 (age 44)
- Party: Republicans
- Relatives: Cleitinho Azevedo (twin brother)

Gleidson Gontijo Azevedo (born 15 April 1982) is a Brazilian politician who was elected member of the Chamber of Deputies in 2026. From 2021 to 2026, he served as mayor of Divinópolis. He is the twin brother of Cleitinho Azevedo.
