= Ismar Madeira =

Brazilian journalist (born 1967)

- Born: June 18, 1967 (age 59); Foz do Iguaçu, Paraná, Brazil
- Occupation: Journalist

Ismar Madeira Cunha Júnior, better known as Ismar Madeira (born June 18, 1967), is a Brazilian journalist.

== Biography and career ==
Born in Foz do Iguaçu, Paraná, Madeira moved at the age of 4 with his family to Brasília, where he stagied in the assessory of social communication of the Brazilian National Indigenous People Foundation and in Rádio Nacional. In 1989, Madeira was hired by TV Brasília (in the time, afffiliated with Rede Manchete), where he worked as the editor of the newscasts Tele Manchete and Tele Manhã.

In 1990, Madeira joined to TV Globo Brasília, where he was reporter and presenter of the local edition of Globo Esporte. He also did reports to DFTV and to Esporte Espetacular, until be called to the team of the newscast Bom Dia DF, in 1992.

In 1995, Madeira moved to Belo Horizonte, Minas Gerais, joining in the following year to TV Globo Minas. On the station, he presented Bom Dia Minas and also was occasional presenter of MGTV. In 2018, Madeira left the station after 22 years to become, in the following year, correspondent of the network in New York City, United States. He stayed on the function until June 2025, being replaced by Nilson Klava. Since then, Madeira integrates the team of reporters of TV Globo São Paulo.
