= Reginaldo Lopes =

Brazilian politician

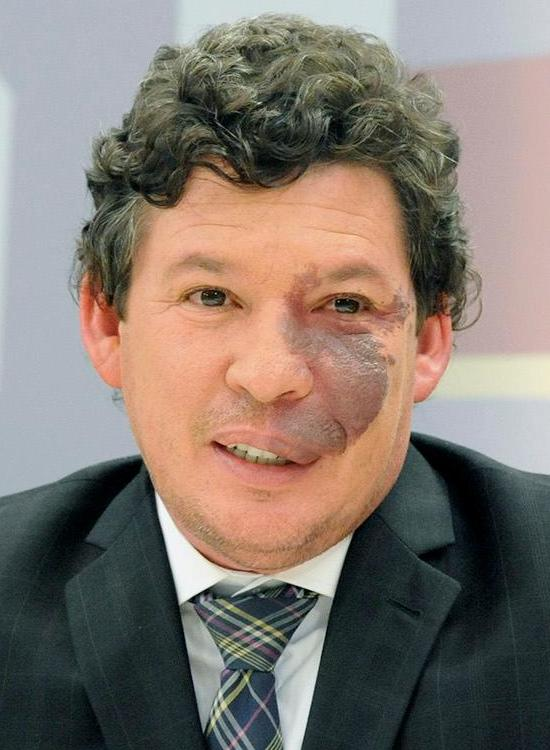

Member of the Chamber of Deputies
- Incumbent
- Assumed office 1 February 2003
- Constituency: Minas Gerais

Personal details
- Born: Reginaldo Lázaro de Oliveira Lopes; 2 April 1973 (age 53) Bom Sucesso, Minas Gerais, Brazil
- Party: PT (since 1993)
- Profession: Economist

Reginaldo Lázaro de Oliveira Lopes (born 2 April 1973) is a Brazilian economist and politician. He serves as a federal deputy for the Workers' Party (PT) for Minas Gerais. He is the current leader of the PT caucus in the Chamber of Deputies.

== Early life and education ==
Lopes was born on 2 April 1973 in Bom Sucesso, Minas Gerais. He attended the Federal University of São João del-Rei, where he received his degree in economics. Lopes is the author of the Access to Information Law (LAI).

== Political career ==
He was elected federal deputy in the 2002 elections with 64,000 votes. He was reelected in 2006, 2010, and 2014, where he received 310,226 votes and was the most-voted candidate in Minas Gerais.

In 2016, Lopes was a candidate for mayor of Belo Horizonte, leading a coalition formed by the PT and the Communist Party of Brazil. During the campaign, federal deputy Jô Moraes served as his running mate. He ultimately lost the race, coming in fourth place with 7% of the total vote.

In the 2018 elections, he was reelected for his fifth term as federal deputy.

In 2022 he assumed the leadership of the Workers' Party in the Chamber of Deputies, succeeding deputy Bohn Gass. He became the youngest parliamentarian to assume the position of leader of the PT bench.
