= Carlos Viana =

Brazilian journalist and politician

Senator for Minas Gerais
- Incumbent
- Assumed office 1 February 2019

Personal details
- Born: 22 March 1963 (age 63) Braúnas, Minas Gerais, Brazil
- Party: PODE (since 2023)
- Other political affiliations: PSC (2003–2009); PMN (2009–2018); PHS (2018–2019); PSD (2019–2021); MDB (2021–2022); PL (2022–2023)
- Occupation: Journalist and politician

Carlos Alberto Dias Viana (born 22 March 1963) is a Brazilian journalist and politician, affiliated with Podemos (PODE) and currently a senator for Minas Gerais.

== Journalistic career ==
Carlos Viana has a degree in journalism and a postgraduate degree in Strategic Marketing Management from the Center for Administrative Research at UFMG. Viana began his professional career at the age of 24, when he was chosen as the Brazilian representative of the company Deutsche Lufthansa AG to develop dissemination projects about Germany in the state of Minas Gerais, for six years. Carlos Viana carried out several activities and courses abroad, having visited 16 countries and taking thousands of Brazilians to know the German landscapes and professional fairs. At the time, the Lufthansa office in Belo Horizonte became one of the most profitable in all of Brazil.

In television, he started as a reporter for Rede Minas, TV Globo Minas, and Rede Bahia. After returning to Minas Gerais in 1999, he gained visibility as a reporter and presenter of Jornal da Alterosa, shown by the Minas Gerais television network TV Alterosa. In 2004, Viana left the position of presenter and assistant editor at Jornal da Alterosa, to present and edit Alterosa Urgente, a program that premiered on June 16, 2004 on TV Alterosa, and which aimed to show the news of greatest interest in Minas Gerais, with instant information about the most important things happening in Belo Horizonte.

In October 2004 he went to the United States where, in the city of Cliffside Park, New Jersey, he served as editor-in-chief of National – The Brazilian Newspaper.

Upon returning to Brazil, he was hired by Rádio Itatiaia in 2007 to present the program Plantão da Cidade. During this same period, he acted as anchor of the journalism and police coverage program Balanço Geral, shown on TV Record Minas, a program he directed for almost a year.

In 2008, Viana left the presentation of the program and Record Minas, and returned to TV Alterosa, to once again present Alterosa Urgente. This new visit to the station was quick, when after three months the journalist left the station.

A few months later, Viana returned to Record Minas where he presented the MG Record until June 2018.

On the radio, Viana acted as presenter of Plantão da Cidade, a program broadcast by Rádio Itatiaia, until December 15, 2018.

In print journalism, Viana had stints in newspapers in the capital of Minas Gerais as a reporter for vehicles, in addition to signing for two years a column specializing in aviation in one of the largest circulation newspapers in Minas Gerais.

== Political career ==
Affiliated to the Humanist Party of Solidarity (PHS) in April 2018, he announced that he would be a candidate for one of the two senator seats in the state elections in Minas Gerais in 2018. He was elected along with Rodrigo Pacheco.

In December 2018, he announced his joining the Social Democratic Party (PSD), having his membership paid in February 2019. In December 2021, Viana joined the Brazilian Democratic Movement (MDB). In April 2022, he decided to leave the Brazilian Democratic Movement (MDB) and join the Liberal Party to support Bolsonaro at the 2022 election.

In February 2023, he left the Liberal Party (PL) to join Podemos (PODE).
