= André Quintão =

Brazilian politician (born 1964)

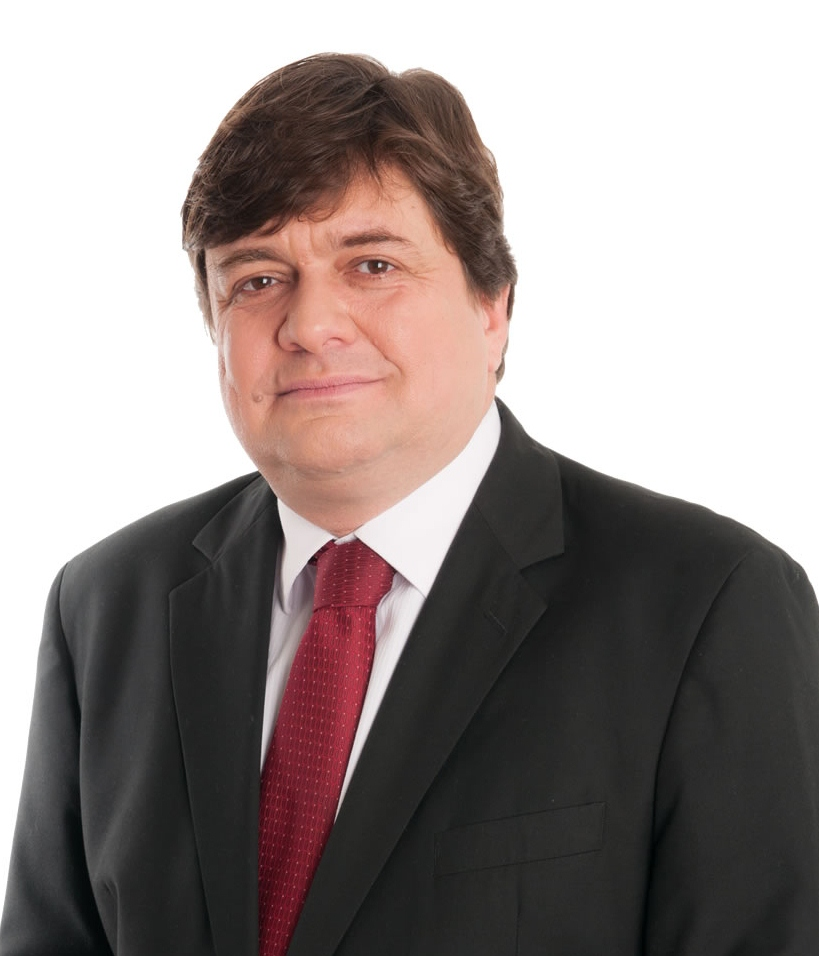
- Quintão in 2014

Member of the Legislative Assembly of Minas Gerais
- In office 1 February 2003 – 31 January 2023

Personal details
- Born: 5 August 1964 (age 61)
- Party: Workers' Party

André Quintão Silva (born 5 August 1964) is a Brazilian politician serving as secretary of social assistance of the Ministry of Social Development since 2023. From 2003 to 2023, he was a member of the Legislative Assembly of Minas Gerais.
