= 2018 Minas Gerais general election =

Regional elections in Brazil

2018 Minas Gerais state election
- 7 October 2018 (first round); 28 October 2018 (second round)
- Opinion polls
- Gubernatorial election
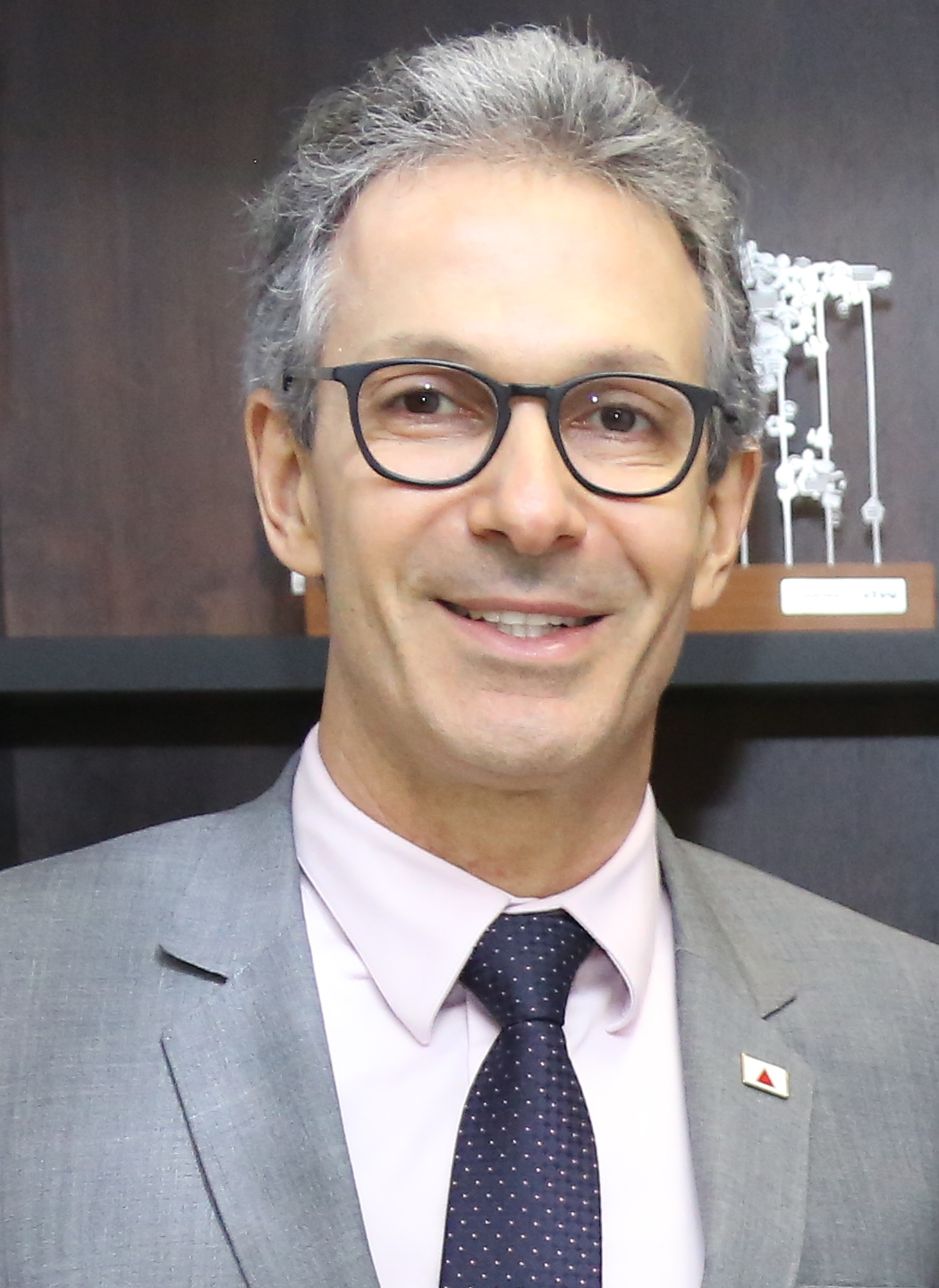

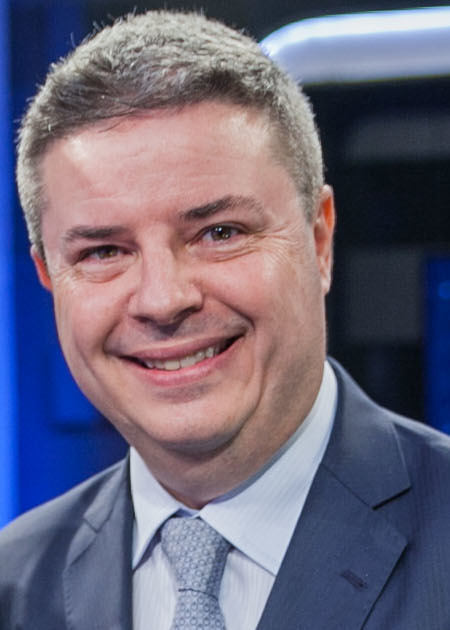
Candidate	Romeu Zema	Antonio Anastasia
Party	NOVO	PSDB
Running mate	Paulo Brant	Marcos Montes
Popular vote	6,963,806	2,734,452
Percentage	71.80%	28.20%
- Romeu Zema; Antonio Anastasia
Governor before election
Fernando Pimentel
PT
Elected Governor
Romeu Zema
NOVO
- Parliamentary election
Party	Leader	Vote %	Seats	+/–
Legislative Assembly
MDB		7.37	7	−3
Republicanos		7.16	3	+1
PSL		7.05	6	+6
PSDB		6.60	7	−2
PHS		4.13	3	+2
PTB		3.94	3	−1
PSC		3.90	3	+1
PV		3.32	5	+1
DEM		2.96	1	−1
Solidarity		2.78	2	+2
This lists parties that won seats. See the complete results below.

The 2018 state elections in Minas Gerais were held on 7 October, as part of the general elections in the Federal District and in 26 states, to elect one Governor and Vice Governor, two Senators and four substitutes for Senator, 53 Federal Deputies, and 77 State Deputies. In the election for Governor, entrepreneur Romeu Zema (NOVO) finished in first place with 42.73% of the valid votes, followed by Senator Antonio Anastasia (PSDB) with 29.06%. Incumbent Governor Fernando Pimentel (PT) couldn't re-elect, placing third place with 23.12% of the votes. As the first place didn't reach 50% of the votes, a second round took place on 28 October. Zema was elect Governor with 71.80% of the votes, and Anastasia placed second with 28.20%.

For the Federal Senate, the then Federal Deputy Rodrigo Pacheco (DEM) and the journalist and presenter Carlos Viana (PHS) were elect to fill the seats of Aécio Neves (PSDB) and Zezé Perrella (MDB). They had, respectively, 20.49% and 20.22% of the votes. Dinis Pinheiro (SD) place third with 18.42% of the votes, and former president Dilma Rousseff (PT), who had been impeached two years before, placed fourth with 15.35% of the votes.

== Gubernatorial candidates ==
=== Candidates in runoff ===
Party	Candidate	Most relevant political office or occupation	Party	Running mate	Coalition	Electoral number
New Party (NOVO)	Romeu Zema (NOVO)	Former Head of Zema Group	New Party (NOVO)	Paulo Brant (NOVO)	—N/a	30
Brazilian Social Democracy Party (PSDB)	Antônio Anastasia	Senator for Minas Gerais (2015–2022)	(PSD)	Marcos Montes (PSD)	Rebuild Minas: Brazilian Social Democracy Party (PSDB); Social Democratic Party (Brazil, 2011) (PSD); Democrats (DEM); Solidariedade; Brazilian Labour Party (PTB); Popular Socialist Party (PPS); Party of National Mobilization (PMN); Social Christian Party (PSC); Christian Labour Party (PTC); Patriota; Brazilian Woman's Party (PMB)	45

=== Candidates failing to make runoff ===
Party	Candidate	Most relevant political office or occupation	Party	Running mate	Coalition	Electoral number
Workers' Party (PT)	Fernando Pimentel (PT)	Governor of Minas Gerais (2015–2019)	Communist Party of Brazil (PCdoB)	Jô Moraes (PCdoB)	On the People's Side: Workers' Party (PT); Communist Party of Brazil (PCdoB); Brazilian Socialist Party (PSB); Christian Democracy (DC)	13
Brazilian Democratic Movement (MDB)	Adalclever Lopes (MDB)	State Deputy of Minas Gerais (2003–2019)	Green Party (PV)	Adriana Buzelin (PV)	#MinasHasAWay: Brazilian Democratic Movement (MDB); Green Party (PV); Democratic Labour Party (PDT); Podemos (PODE); Republican Party of the Social Order (PROS); Brazilian Republican Party (PRB)	15
United Socialist Workers' Party (PSTU)	Jordano Carvalho (PSTU)	Metalworker and steelworker	United Socialist Workers' Party (PSTU)	Victoria de Fatima (PSTU)	—N/a	16
Sustainability Network (REDE)	João Batista dos Mares Guia (REDE)	State Deputy of Minas Gerais (1983–1987)	Sustainability Network (REDE)	Giovanni Corrêa (REDE)	The Best for Minas: Sustainability Network (REDE); Brazilian Labour Renewal Party (PRTB)	18
Workers' Cause Party (PCO)	Alexandre Flach	Lawyer	Workers' Cause Party (PCO)	Sebastião Pessoa (PCO)	—N/a	29
Socialism and Liberty Party (PSOL)	Dirlene Marques (PSOL)	Retired public worker	Socialism and Liberty Party (PSOL)	Sara Azevedo	Socialist Minas Front: Socialism and Liberty Party (PSOL); Brazilian Communist Party (PCB)	50
Avante	Claudiney Dulim (Avante)	Lawyer and professor	Avante	Leandro Ramon (Avante)	—N/a	77

== Opinion polls ==
=== Governor ===
==== First round ====
Pollster/client(s)	Date(s) conducted	Sample size	Anastasia PSDB	Veiga PSDB	Pimentel PT	Zema NOVO	Others	Abst. Undec.	Lead
2018 election	7 Oct	–	29.06%	–	23.12%	42.73%	5.09%	20.67%	13.67%
Datafolha	3–4 Oct	1,585	32%	–	21%	15%	10%	22%	11%
Datafolha	26–28 Sep	1,387	32%	–	23%	19%	7%	21%	9%
Ibope	24–26 Sep	2,002	35%	–	21%	8%	8%	27%	14%
Datafolha	4–6 Sep	1,289	32%	–	22%	5%	7%	35%	10%
Ibope	24–26 Aug	1,204	24%	–	14%	3%	7%	51%	10%
2014 election	5 Oct 2014	–	–	41.89%	52.98%	–	5.13%	16.93%	11.09%

==== Second round ====
Pollster/client(s)	Date(s) conducted	Sample size	Zema NOVO	Anastasia PSDB	Abst. Undec.	Lead
2018 election	28 Oct	–	71.80%	28.20%	19.61%	43.60%
Ibope	25–27 Oct	2,002	58%	27%	15%	31%
Ibope	20–23 Oct	1,512	57%	29%	15%	28%
Datafolha	17–18 Oct	1,473	58%	24%	19%	34%
Ibope	15–17 Oct	1,512	57%	29%	14%	28%
Paraná Pesquisas	9–10 Oct	1,750	64.7%	23.1%	12.1%	41.6%

=== Senator ===
Pollster/client(s)	Date(s) conducted	Sample size	Rousseff PT	Viana PHS	Pinheiro SD	Pacheco DEM	Neves PSDB	Franco PPS	Others	Abst. Undec. (1st seat)	Abst. Undec. (2nd seat)	Lead
2018 election	7 Oct	–	15.35%	20.22%	18.42%	20.49%	–	–	25.51%	27.74%		0.27%
Datafolha	26–28 Sep	1,384	28%	14%	10%	17%	–	–	41%	31%	49%	11%
Ibope	24–26 Sep	2,002	26%	15%	15%	14%	–	–	48%	55%	63%	11%
Ibope	9–11 Sep	1,512	28%	12%	7%	7%	–	–	39%	20%	30%	16%
Datafolha	4–6 Sep	1,289	26%	11%	7%	9%	–	–	46%	40%	61%	15%
Datafolha	20–21 Aug	1,214	25%	11%	5%	6%	–	–	53%	37%	63%	14%
2010 election	3 Oct 2010	–	–	–	–	–	39.47%	26.74%	33.79%	19.06%		12.73%

== Debates ==
2018 Minas Gerais gubernatorial election debates
No.	Date and time	Hosts	Moderators	Participants							
Key: P Present A Absent N Not invited W Withdrawn Out Out of the race				NOVO	PSDB	PT	MDB	REDE	PSOL	Avante	PSB
Key: P Present A Absent N Not invited W Withdrawn Out Out of the race				Zema	Anastasia	Pimentel	Lopes	Guia	Marques	Dulim	Lacerda
1.1	Thursday, 16 August 2018, 22:00	Rede Bandeirantes	Inácia Soares	N	P	P	Out	P	P	P	P
1.2	Saturday, 18 August 2018, 23:00	TV Alterosa, Uai	Benny Cohen	N	P	P	P	P	P	P	W
1.3	Saturday, 29 September 2018, 13:25	RecordTV, R7, Super Notícia FM	Eduardo Ribeiro	N	P	P	P	P	P	P	W
1.4	Tuesday, 2 October 2018, 22:05	TV Globo, G1	Ismar Madeira	P	P	P	P	N	P	P	W
2.1	Thursday, 18 October 2018, 22:30	Rede Bandeirantes	Inácia Soares	P	P	Out					
2.2	Saturday, 18 October 2018, 13:20	RecordTV, R7, Super Notícia FM	Carla Cecato	P	P	Out					
2.3	Tuesday, 23 October 2018, 17:45	TV Alterosa, Uai	Benny Cohen	P	A	Out					
2.4	Thursday, 25 October 2018, 22:05	TV Globo, G1	Ismar Madeira	P	P	Out					

== Results ==
=== Governor ===
Candidate	Running mate	Party	First round		Second round	
Candidate	Running mate	Party	Votes	%	Votes	%
Romeu Zema	Paulo Brant	NOVO	4,138,967	42.73	6,963,806	71.80
Antônio Anastasia	Marcos Montes (PSD)	PSDB	2,814,704	29.06	2,734,452	28.20
Fernando Pimentel (incumbent)	Jô Moraes (PCdoB)	PT	2,239,379	23.12		
Adalclever Lopes	Adriana Buzelin (PV)	MDB	268,683	2.77		
Dirlene Marques	Sara Azevedo	PSOL	133,986	1.38		
João Batista dos Mares Guia	Giovanni Corrêa	REDE	56,856	0.59		
Claudiney Dulim	Leandro Ramon	Avante	18,330	0.19		
Jordano Carvalho	Victoria de Fátima	PSTU	15,742	0.16		
Alexandre Flach	Sebastião Pessoa	PCO	4,088			
Total			9,686,647	100.00	9,698,258	100.00
Valid votes			9,686,647	79.33	9,698,258	80.39
Invalid votes			1,726,473	14.14	1,889,549	15.66
Blank votes			797,534	6.53	476,476	3.95
Total votes			12,210,654	100.00	12,064,283	100.00
Registered voters/turnout			15,695,210	77.80	15,695,210	76.87
NOVO gain from PT						
Source: G1

Popular vote (first round)
Zema	42.73%
Anastasia	29.06%
Pimentel	23.12%
Others	5.09%

Popular vote (second round)
Zema	71.80%
Anastasia	28.20%

=== Senator ===
Candidate	Party	Votes	%
Rodrigo Pacheco	DEM	3,616,864	20.49
Carlos Viana	PHS	3,568,658	20.22
Dinis Pinheiro	Solidariedade	3,251,175	18.42
Dilma Rousseff	PT	2,709,223	15.35
Rodrigo Paiva	NOVO	1,342,645	7.61
Miguel Corrêa	PT	1,282,946	7.27
Fábio Cherem	PDT	899,824	5.10
Duda Salabert	PSOL	351,874	1.99
Elio Lacer	PPL	307,197	1.74
Tulio Lopes	PCB	92,165	0.52
Kaka Menezes	REDE	86,771	0.49
Alcindor Damasceno	PPL	56,129	0.32
Vanessa Portugal	PSTU	53,272	0.30
Edson André	Avante	29,869	0.17
Ana Alves	PCO	25,675	
Total		17,648,612	100.00
Valid votes		17,647,433	72.26
Invalid votes		4,566,929	18.70
Blank votes		2,206,967	9.04
Total votes		24,421,329	100.00
Registered voters/turnout		31,390,420	77.80
DEM gain from PSDB			
PHS gain from MDB			
Source: G1

Popular vote
Pacheco	20.49%
Viana	20.22%
Pinheiro	18.42%
Rousseff	15.35%
Paiva	7.61%
Corrêa	7.27%
Cherem	5.10%
Others	5.53%

=== Chamber of Deputies ===
Party	Votes	%	Seats	+/–
Workers' Party	1,343,833	13.33	8	▼2
Social Liberal Party	1,100,263	10.92	6	▲6
Brazilian Social Democracy Party	769,033	7.63	5	▼2
Avante	616,562	6.12	3	▲2
Brazilian Democratic Movement	610,205	6.05	4	▼2
New Party	461,859	4.58	2	New
Social Democratic Party	457,320	4.54	3	Steady
Humanist Party of Solidarity	394,033	3.91	2	▲1
Republican Party of the Social Order	377,657	3.75	2	▲2
Progressistas	372,000	3.69	2	▼3
Party of the Republic	355,184	3.52	1	▼2
Brazilian Republican Party	354,433	3.52	2	▲1
Brazilian Socialist Party	335,216	3.33	3	Steady
Democratic Labour Party	298,899	2.97	2	Steady
Democrats	285,912	2.84	1	▼1
Patriota	277,469	2.75	2	▲2
Socialism and Liberty Party	241,908	2.40	1	▲1
Podemos	233,631	2.32	1	Steady
Social Christian Party	202,230	2.01	1	Steady
Brazilian Labour Party	148,428	1.47	0	▼1
Solidariedade	131,080	1.30	1	Steady
Green Party	126,374	1.25	0	▼1
Brazilian Labour Renewal Party	115,623	1.15	0	Steady
Popular Socialist Party	108,242	1.07	0	Steady
Communist Party of Brazil	71,706	0.71	0	▼1
Christian Democracy	55,761	0.55	0	Steady
Party of National Mobilization	54,068	0.54	1	Steady
Christian Labour Party	52,458	0.52	0	▼1
Sustainability Network	41,782	0.41	0	New
Brazilian Woman's Party	26,643	0.26	0	New
Progressive Republican Party	23,003	0.23	0	▼1
Free Fatherland Party	17,176	0.17	0	Steady
Brazilian Communist Party	12,247	0.12	0	Steady
United Socialist Workers' Party	5,782	0.06	0	Steady
Total	10,078,020	100.00	53	–
Valid votes	10,078,020	82.53		
Invalid votes	1,284,839	10.52		
Blank votes	848,270	6.95		
Total votes	12,211,129	100.00		
Registered voters/turnout	15,695,210	77.80		
Source: Superior Electoral Court

=== Legislative Assembly ===
Party	Votes	%	Seats	+/–
Workers' Party	1,189,187	11.75	10	Steady
Brazilian Democratic Movement	746,112	7.37	7	▼3
Brazilian Republican Party	724,626	7.16	3	▲1
Social Liberal Party	712,957	7.05	6	▲6
Brazilian Social Democracy Party	668,049	6.60	7	▼2
Social Democratic Party	418,249	4.13	4	Steady
Humanist Party of Solidarity	417,651	4.13	3	▲2
Brazilian Labour Party	398,959	3.94	3	▼1
Social Christian Party	394,159	3.90	3	▲1
New Party	372,346	3.68	3	New
Green Party	336,213	3.32	5	▲1
Democrats	299,902	2.96	1	▼1
Solidariedade	281,184	2.78	2	▲2
Podemos	279,618	2.76	2	▼1
Democratic Labour Party	257,410	2.54	2	▼2
Avante	243,184	2.40	2	▼1
Brazilian Socialist Party	240,779	2.38	1	▼2
Brazilian Labour Renewal Party	221,983	2.19	1	▲1
Patriota	217,775	2.15	2	▲1
Communist Party of Brazil	217,040	2.14	1	▼2
Party of the Republic	201,924	2.00	2	▼1
Popular Socialist Party	199,971	1.98	1	▼2
Republican Party of the Social Order	189,560	1.87	1	Steady
Christian Democracy	177,674	1.76	1	▲1
Progressistas	161,627	1.60	1	▼2
Socialism and Liberty Party	124,439	1.23	1	▲1
Progressive Republican Party	110,356	1.09	1	▲1
Christian Labour Party	104,695	1.03	0	▼1
Sustainability Network	98,796	0.98	1	New
Party of National Mobilization	64,472	0.64	0	▼1
Brazilian Communist Party	19,585	0.19	0	Steady
Free Fatherland Party	14,842	0.15	0	Steady
United Socialist Workers' Party	9,077	0.09	0	Steady
Brazilian Woman's Party	4,741	0.05	0	New
Total	10,119,142	100.00	77	–
Valid votes	10,119,142	82.87		
Invalid votes	1,269,867	10.40		
Blank votes	822,222	6.73		
Total votes	12,211,231	100.00		
Registered voters/turnout	15,695,210	77.80		
Source: Superior Electoral Court
