= Bom Sucesso, Minas Gerais =

Bom Sucesso
- Municipality
- The Municipality of Bom Sucesso
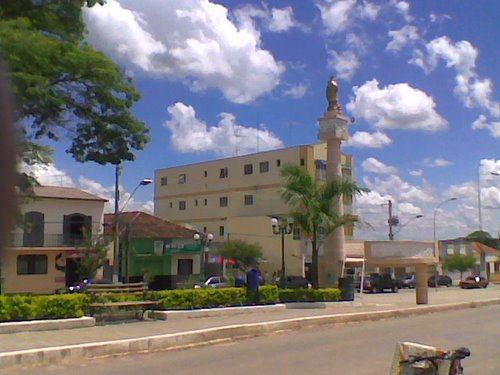
- Main church of Bom Sucesso

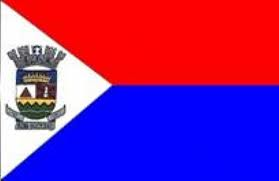
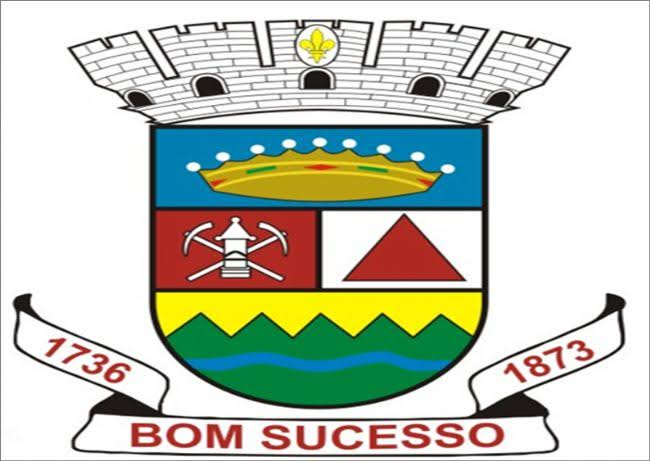
- Flag Coat of arms
- Motto: Crescimento com Justiça e Solidariedade (Development with Justice and Solidarity)
- Location of Bom Sucesso in Minas Gerais
- Coordinates: 21°01′58″S 44°45′28″W
- Country: Brazil
- Region: Southeast
- State: Minas Gerais
- Founded: September 8, 1736

Government
  - Mayor: Aloísio Roquim (DEM)

Area
  - Total: 706.192 km^{2} (272.662 sq mi)
- Elevation: 952 m (3,123 ft)

Population (2020)
  - Total: 17,607
  - Density: 24.46/km^{2} (63.4/sq mi)
- Time zone: UTC−3 (BRT)
- HDI (2000): 0.754 – medium

Bom Sucesso is a municipality in the Brazilian state of Minas Gerais.

== Notable people ==
Igor Julio (born 1998) Brazilian footballer currently playing for Brighton and Hove Albion

== See also ==
- List of municipalities in Minas Gerais
