= Braúnas =

Coordinates: 19.0558°S 42.7158°W

- Municipality
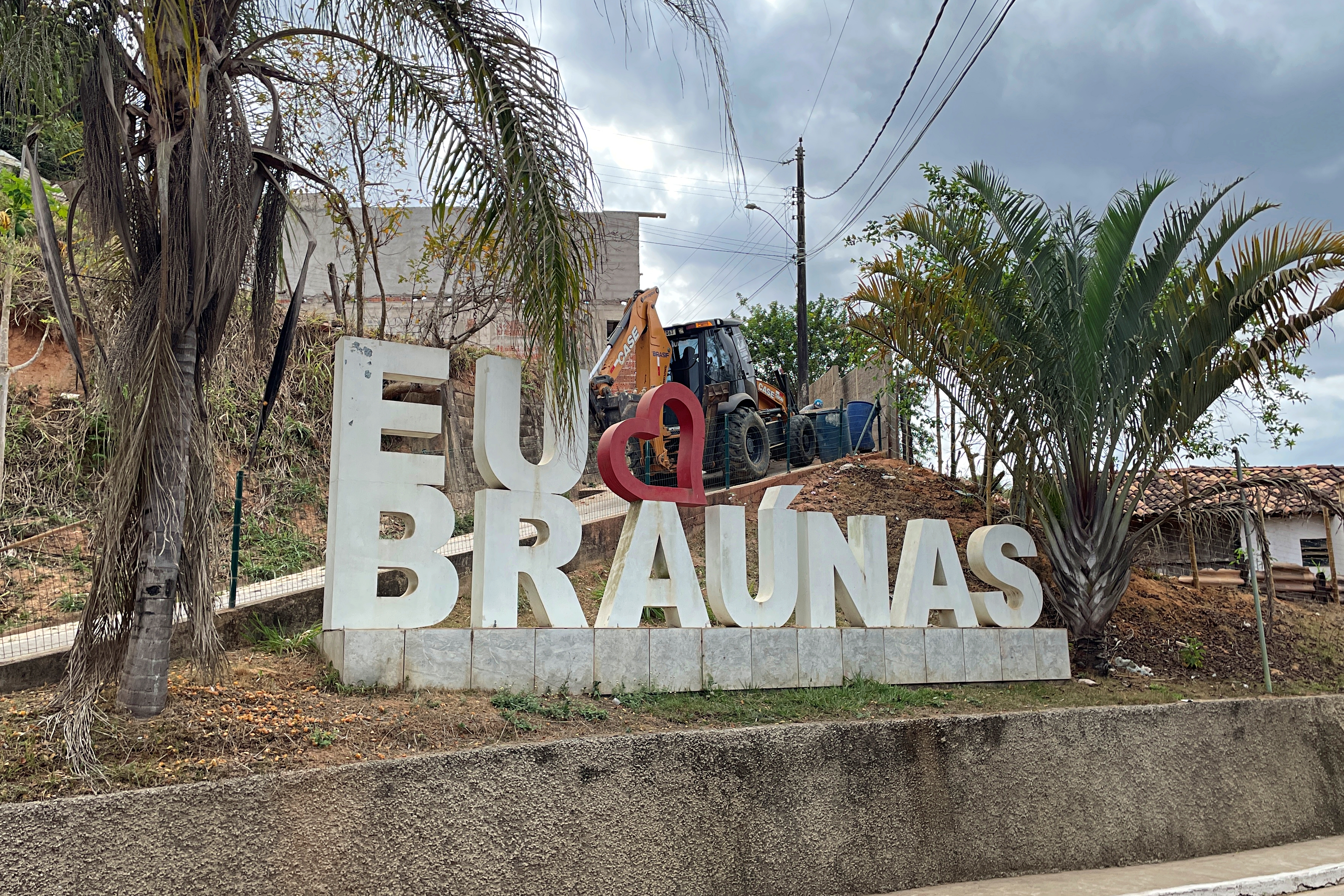
- Braúnas

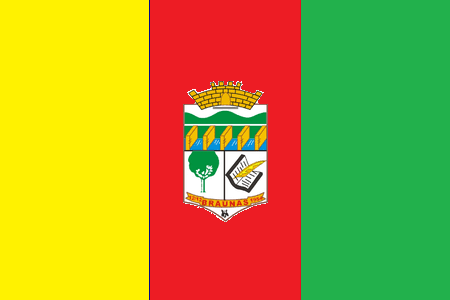
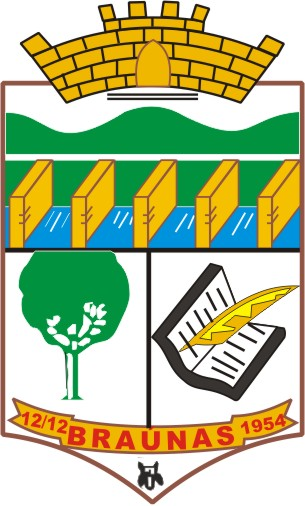
- Flag Coat of arms
- Interactive map of Braúnas
- Country: Brazil
- Region: Southeast
- State: Minas Gerais
- Mesoregion: Vale do Rio Doce

Population (2022 Census)
  - Total: 4,441
  - Estimate (2025): 4,445
- Time zone: UTC−3 (BRT)

Braúnas is a municipality in the state of Minas Gerais in the Southeast region of Brazil.

== See also ==
- List of municipalities in Minas Gerais
