= Miguel Corrêa =

Brazilian politician (born 1978)

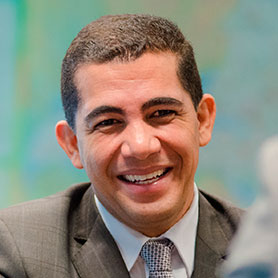
- Corrêa in 2018

Member of the Chamber of Deputies
- In office 1 February 2007 – 31 January 2019
- Constituency: Minas Gerais

Personal details
- Born: 11 June 1978 (age 47)
- Party: Democratic Labour Party (since 2022)

Miguel Corrêa da Silva Júnior (born 11 June 1978) is a Brazilian politician. From 2007 to 2019, he was a member of the Chamber of Deputies. In the 2018 general election, he was a candidate for the Federal Senate.
