= Autism in Brazil =

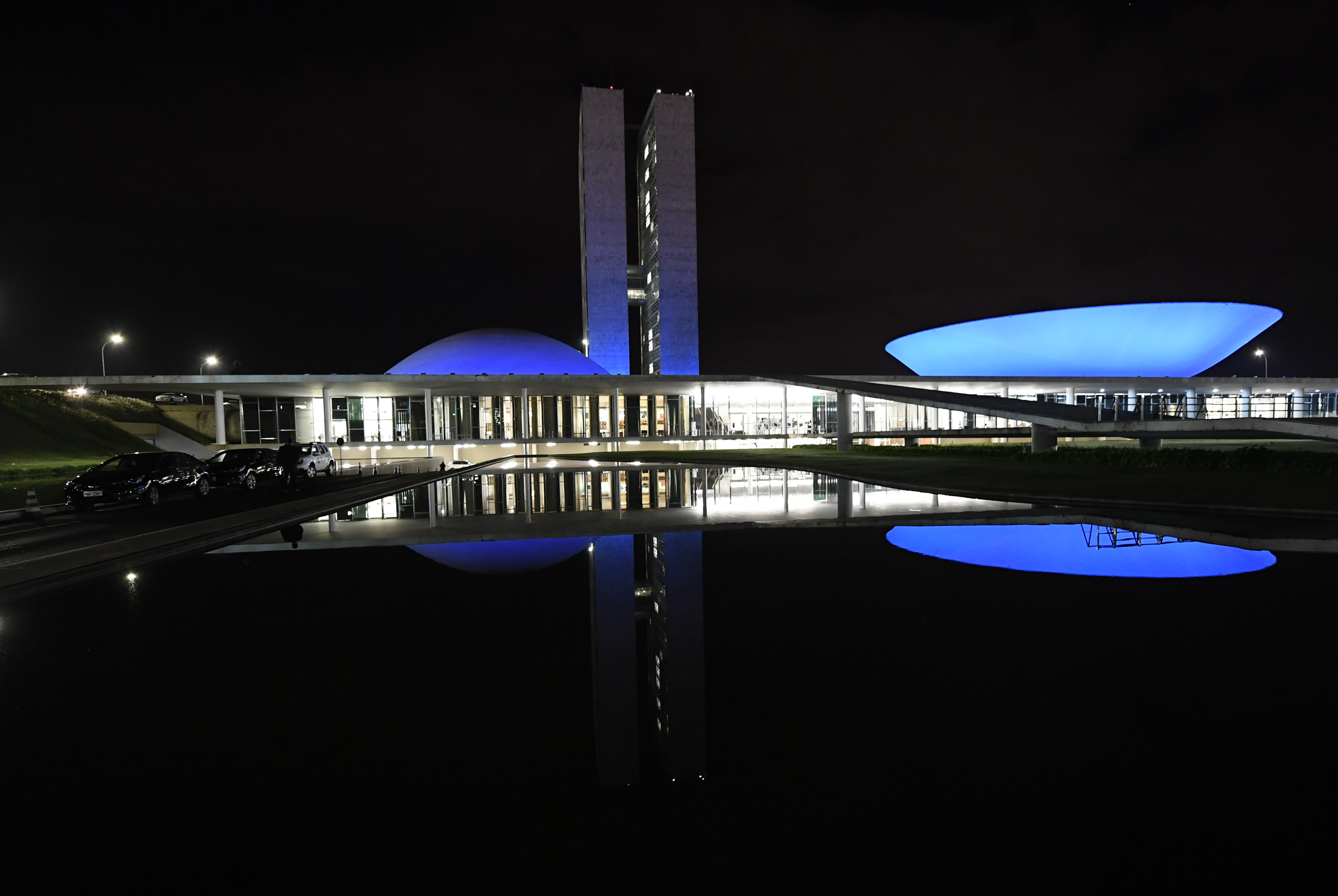
National Congress during World Autism Awareness Day 2019.

Autism in Brazil has had a number of manifestations since the 20th century. It was introduced through child psychiatry with the predominant influence of psychoanalysis in medical care in the mid-1950s. The development of a community based on autism was late, with the founding of the Associação de Amigos do Autista (AMA) in 1983. Since then, autism has become a topic of interest for family members, health professionals and autistic people with the predominance of a neurobiological view of the diagnosis.

Before there were initiatives aimed at diagnosis, autism appeared in newspaper headlines translated by news agencies. In the 1970s, some of the first congresses and institutions focussed on autism emerged. In the 1980s, the disorder began to gain greater public visibility with the emergence of associations founded by mothers and fathers, such as AMA and, later, the Associação Brasileira de Autismo (Abra). In the 1990s and 2000s, the popularisation of autism developed in different states of the country, while the first legislation was developed. At the end of the 2000s, discussions began about creating a national law on autism. In the 2010s, the National Policy for the Protection of the Rights of People with Autism Spectrum Disorders was sanctioned, while autistic people began to participate with greater emphasis in institutional activism, as well as the creation of media about autism.

The autism scene in Brazil is also characterised by tensions and conflicts between activists and organisations on issues such as health interventions, special education and autism representation. Until the 2020s, there was no prevalence of autism in the Brazilian population. For this reason, estimates based on figures from the US Centers for Disease Control and Prevention (CDC) were common in manifestos and journalistic texts.

== Descriptions and statistics ==
Looking at the historical panorama, researchers Francisco Ortega, Rafaela Zorzanelli and Clarice Rios say that autism in Brazil represents a scenario of "wars" that are inserted in the definition of what autism is, in mental health policies and in media narratives. The authors also point out that, historically, psychoanalysis has lost ground, while behavioural approaches have become the main ones in the field. In 2022, the Ministry of Health described autism as "a disorder characterised by the alteration of the individual's neurodevelopmental functions, interfering with the capacity for communication, language, social interaction and behaviour", with an emphasis on early diagnosis and "development of stimuli".

Numbers from Abra in 1997 estimated 600,000 people with "classic autism" in Brazil. In February 2011, the first autism epidemiology study in Latin America was published, with data from 2010, led by child psychiatrist Marcos Tomanik Mercadante. The study were based on a pilot project with a sample of 20,000 people in a neighbourhood in the São Paulo city of Atibaia, and measured the prevalence of one case of autism for every 368 children aged between 7 and 12. In the following years, different estimates of autism in Brazil were presented based on figures from the US Centers for Disease Control and Prevention (CDC). In 2014, it was estimated that there were 2 million autistic Brazilians, while by 2023 the number had risen to almost 6 million.

In 2019, in order to cover the gap in the number of autistic people in Brazil, Law 13.861/19 was sanctioned, which aimed to provide official data on the country. For this reason, the 2022 Brazilian census was the first to contain information on autism.

== History ==
=== 1950–1980: Background ===
According to historian Bruna Alves Lopes, there were few records of autism in Brazil until the 1980s. In the 1940s, when the work of psychiatrist Leo Kanner introduced autism as an independent diagnosis, Brazil already had a significant influence of psychoanalysis in child care. The psychoanalytic field began to penetrate the country in the 1920s and achieved hegemony within psychiatry itself by the mid-1950s. At the same time, the idea that the cause of autism was a lack of bonding between the parents (especially mothers) and the child emerged with Kanner in 1948, but it was psychoanalyst Bruno Bettelheim who developed it throughout the 1950s and 1960s.

In Brazil, the first journalistic publications related autism were made up of stories translated by news agencies from countries such as the United States and the United Kingdom and characterised the diagnosis as a disease. Some of them were influenced by a psychoanalytic bias, considering autistic children as belonging to cold and distant parents, while others addressed it as one of the symptoms of schizophrenia. Bettelheim's thinking had a significant influence on the journalistic content of these periods, with rare exceptions that cited Kanner's work and even behaviourist approaches. Most of them don't mention relevant and positive roles in relation to the families of autistic people.

At the same time, the professionals of autism was aligned with child psychiatry and child disability. In 1956, the Associação Paulista de Psiquiatria Infantil e Higiene Mental was created, and in 1965 the Associação Brasileira de Deficiência Mental. In the city of Porto Alegre, the Comunidade Terapêutica Leo Kanner was set up in 1963. For a large part of the population, autistic care took place in non-specialised institutions, such as the Pestalozzi Society, founded in 1932, and the Associação de Pais e Amigos dos Excepcionais (APAE), with units all over the country, and organised in 1962.

In the 1970s, discussions about autism in Brazil have grown, culminating years later in the formation of a community. In June 1970, the Centro de Estudos da Casa de Saúde Dr. Eiras, in Rio de Janeiro, held a debate on the diagnosis based on a film. Similar events began to take place over the years in institutions across the country, such as round tables based on films about autism, lectures, congresses and courses promoted by national and international professionals in psychiatry and other fields of knowledge, as well as the publication of the first national research on autism. Journalistic publications from this period began to mention the family's contribution to autism treatment more frequently. In 1978, Casa Azul was founded in Rio de Janeiro, probably the first organisation to offer exclusive therapeutic care for autistic children in Brazil. In the same year and in the same city, the Casarão Special Education Centre was also founded by a mother of an autistic child.

=== 1980–1993: First family associations and movements ===
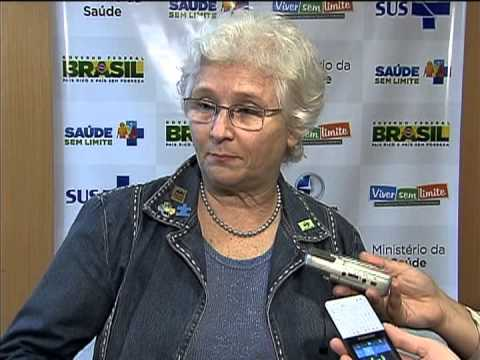
Marisa Furia (pictured in 2013) was one of the founders of AMA.

Autism as a movement began to consolidate in Brazil in the 1980s. It was during this period that family members, especially mothers, dissatisfied with the psychoanalytic blame they received for their children's disorder, began to advocacy to gain access to health services. Especially in large capitals such as São Paulo, Rio de Janeiro and Brasília, family members began to write letters to major newspapers such as Jornal do Brasil and draw the attention of public authorities to the cause of autism.

In April 1980, Rede Globo transmitted in TV the film Son-Rise: A Miracle of Love, which was a ratings success and prompted to rerun it several times throughout the decade. Some family members went so far as to claim that the film was a milestone for autism awareness in the decade. The film, however, highlights a therapeutic programme Son-Rise, which over the years has been shown to be ineffective in the treatment of autism.

The first legalised autism association in Brazil was the Associação de Amigos do Autista (AMA), founded in 1983 by Marisa Fúria and Ana Maria Ros de Melo and formed by clients of doctor Raymond Rosenberg, who shared the anguish of not having more in-depth information about their children's diagnosis and treatment. The first meetings took place in Rosenberg's office and, shortly afterwards, the organisation had a school operating in the backyard of a Baptist church. There are also reports from family activists about autism associations without legal registration already existed in cities such as Belo Horizonte and Rio de Janeiro.

From the second decade of the 1980s onwards, the pioneering autism organisations had the common characteristic of striving for internationalisation and also for spreading the word about autism on national territory. The AMA got the support of actor Antônio Fagundes, who recorded a national TV commercial about the diagnosis for free in 1987. During this period, family activists travelled to foreign countries to learn about new forms of treatment and search for resources. The parents had several reference researchers. One of them was Bernard Rimland. In addition, the work of Ole Ivar Lovaas with Applied Behaviour Analysis also began to be disseminated. Originally, the autism movement was concentrated around mothers and fathers of autistic people, a trend that continued over the decades. Other phefirstna also began to contribute to the development of the autism scene in Brazil during the creation of the New Republic, such as the creation of the Sistema Único de Saúde (SUS) with the Brazilian Constitution of 1988 and psychiatric reform.

In 1988, the Associação Brasileira de Autismo (Abra) was founded in Belo Horizonte, with small organisations from other Brazilian states initially joining with the aim of consolidating a movement with national representation. Under this same unifying character, the Associação Terapêutica Educacional para Crianças Autistas (Asteca) promoted the First National Autism Congress in 1989 together with other organisations (with an audience of around 1,300 people). That year, there were already 23 autism associations in the country. In 1991, the second edition of the congress was attended by more than 2000 people, national speakers and international figures such as the psychiatrist and psychoanalyst René Diatkine and Eric Schopler, creator of the Treatment and Education of Autistic and Related Communication Handicapped Children (TEACCH) programme. During the event, Schopler, based on the research of the time, criticised the use of psychoanalysis to treat autism. The AMA implemented TEACCH over the following years, under the supervision of foreign professionals.

In addition to autism associations, family members began producing various materials to raise awareness of autism. In Rio, the Association of Parents of Autistic People in Rio de Janeiro (Aparj) launched Autismo em Revista in 1989, the first publication of its kind in Brazil. In addition, there was frequent dissemination of translated foreign articles and books, as well as talks to help families. During this period, the paediatrician Christian Gauderer launched the book Autismo, década de 80, a frequent reference for researchers and parents at the time. The AMA, in turn, began to have centres in various Brazilian states in all regions.

=== 1994–2008: National expansion and recognition ===
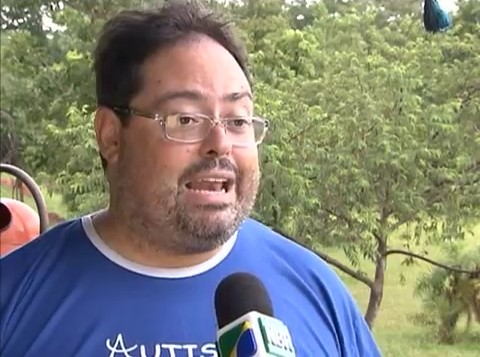
Fernando Cotta (2013) was the founder of the Movimento Orgulho Autista Brasil.

In the global history of autism, the 1990s were characterised by changes in the classification of autism diagnoses, and the central role of the internet in activism and, in Brazil, the period was marked by the development of educational policies. During Itamar Franco's presidency, special education was restructured, which coincided with the Salamanca Declaration. The pioneering organisations continued their activities, sometimes with financial problems and sometimes with new members joining. In this context, the AMA won that year's UNESCO Human Rights Prize in 1998, handed over by president Fernando Henrique Cardoso.

On 13 December 1998, a discussion list about autism was launched on Yahoo!. It was the most influential space for virtual interaction in Brazil about autism, where parents shared stories and doubts about the diagnosis. One of the characteristics of these virtual interactions, according to historian Bruna Alves Lopes, was solidarity between mothers, interaction with people from all over the country and a new characterisation of autism activism, despite the precariousness of the internet connection at the time, marked by dial-up connections. The group remained active and productive for years, even distributing information materials about autism. In 2006, members of the group even launched a translated version of an ABA training manual and some of its members founded various associations throughout Brazil, including the Associação de Familiares e Amigos da Gente Autista (Afaga).

On 18 June 2005, Autism Pride Day, family activists of autistic people in the Federal District held an information blitz about autism on the BR-040/050 highway. This group would later become the organisation Movimento Orgulho Autista Brasil (MOAB). Through MOAB, it was the first time that the topic of neurodiversity entered the discussions on autism in Brazil. In 2008, in Fortaleza, the Associação Brasileira para a Ação por Direitos das Pessoas com Autismo (Abraça) was founded by those in charge of the Casa da Esperança therapeutic institution with the collaboration of activists from other organisations, such as MOAB and Afaga.

=== 2009–present: Legislation and autistic activism ===
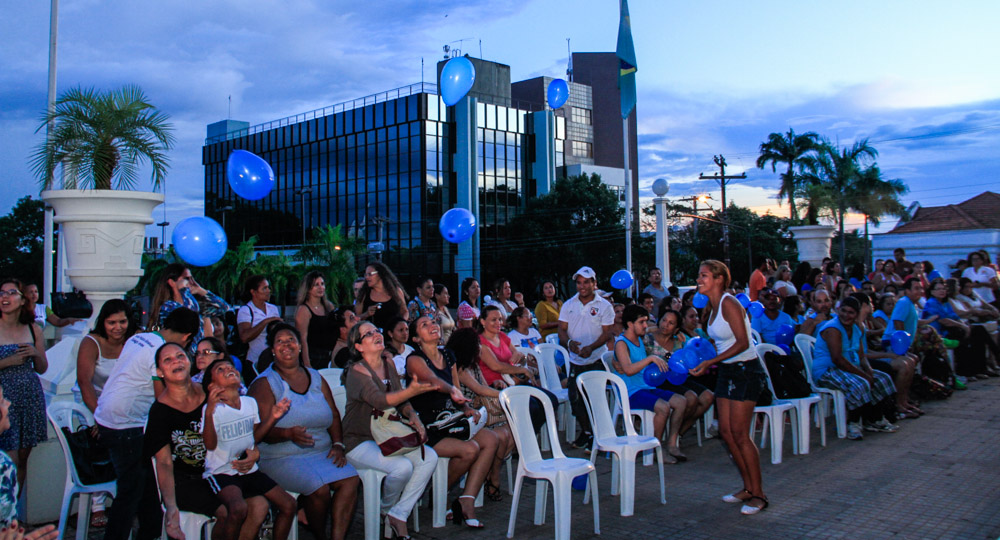
Event related to World Autism Awareness Day 2014, in Rio Branco, Acre.

At the end of 2009, a group of relatives of autistic people, belonging to organisations such as Moab, began to liaise with federal deputies and senators in Brasilia. According to Berenice Piana, the activist Ulisses Batista was in communication with Cristovam Buarque, asking for a public hearing on autism. She, in turn, met Paulo Paim, who was responsible for directing the Human Rights Commission to hold a hearing. The event took place on 24 November 2009, and has developed over the years into a public policy. The text of the law began to be written with the participation of various activists. According to Piana, the text was ready by March 2010, and thus filed. It was approved by the committee in 2011 and went to the plenary in June of that year.

On 27 December 2012, during Dilma Rousseff's government, the National Policy for the Protection of the Rights of People with Autism Spectrum Disorders was instituted, whereby autistic people were classified as people with disabilities. The policy also became known as the Berenice Piana Law, at the suggestion of then-senator Paulo Paim. The legislation had a significant impact on autism in Brazil and on the greater discussion of the disorder in the country. However, the legislation also caused controversy due to the president's vetoes of sections relating to special education and the granting of special hours to civil servants with autistic children. In addition, the treatment of autistic people in Psychosocial Care Centres, an agenda defended by some associations and movements, was the target of disagreements from other activists. The issue even became part of public hearings in the following years in the Chamber of Deputies.

During the 2010s, the participation of people diagnosed with autism in activism grew, with the emergence of blogs, video channels and books written by autistic people and organizations formed by autistics. Topics such as autism in women, sexuality and inclusion in the labour became more frequent. In 2016, Abraça promoted the 1st Brazilian Meeting of Autistic People, an unprecedented event in Fortaleza organised and dedicated solely to autistic people and, at the same time, the association became the first autism organisation in the country with an autistic president, Fernanda Santana. Solo activism by family members of autistic people has also grown, with the rise of names such as journalist Andréa Werner and television presenter Marcos Mion.

In the 2020s, autism legislation in Brazil began to expand beyond the federal level, with states such as Rio Grande do Sul and Pará promoting state policies aimed at autism. Different states in the country independently also began to pass legislation extending the validity period of autism reports, with activists justifying that the process of updating reports was exhausting and pointless, given that autism is a disorder without a cure. In 2021, the autism report debate gained national visibility with a bill aimed at all permanent disabilities. In 2023, the federal government sanctioned the Hidden Disabilities Sunflower of identification for people with hidden disabilities.

In 2021, autistic university students began to create autistic collectives at public universities across Brazil. The movement's first exponents were collectives at the University of São Paulo (USP) and the State University of Campinas (Unicamp). The following year, people involved with the autistic collectives got together with other activists and founded the Associação Nacional para Inclusão das Pessoas Autistas (Ania/BR).

== References in popular culture ==
=== Autistic people ===
Over the years, public figures from outside autism activism share that they were on the autistic spectrum, such as digital colourist Marina Amaral, journalist and podcaster Amanda Ramalho, actress Letícia Sabatella, geographer Elias Jabbour, comic book artist Ana Mei, Brazilian funk singer MC Beth, actor Thiago Picchi, neuroscientist Suzana Herculano-Houzel, palaeontologist Tito Aureliano, comedian and presenter Danilo Gentili, and journalist Renata Simões.

On the discovery of autism, Simões went so far as to say that "Self-knowledge is the great tool for freedom. Because the moment you understand what is yours and what you operate on, [you say] 'no, this isn't mine, it's something you want to throw at me' (...) What is mine, my personality, what is my diagnosis and what is other people's? The moment you discover that, it becomes much easier to exist."

Other figures also claim to be autistic, such as YouTuber and anarcho-capitalist activist Paulo Kogos, who is commonly identified as being active in far-right groups. Despite this, Kogos did not declare himself autistic when he ran for state representative in the 2022 Brazilian elections.

=== Press ===
Historically, the autism agenda has been publicised through the press, whether in readers' letters or television reports. In terms of the print media, the diagnosis has become a topic of growing interest over the decades, with an increasing neurobiological emphasis in traditional media. In a study based on journalistic articles published between 2000 and 2012, the authors noted two main emphases: "denouncing the lack of specialised services and disseminating foreign studies and methodologies". The researchers also stated that these two pillars underpin much of the activism of autistic family members.

In the autism community, members of the Associação de Pais de Autistas do Rio de Janeiro (Aparj) launched Autismo em Revista in 1989, which circulated on a limited basis over the years. In April 2010, Revista Autismo was created. Free of charge and in print and digital formats, the magazine did not have a set periodicity, but in early 2019 it switched to a quarterly periodicity, with national distribution in all Brazilian states, being published in March, June, September and December. From 2020 onwards, it ran an annual national campaign with a defined theme for World Autism Awareness Day, with the first theme being "#Respectro - Respect for the whole spectrum." The same year saw the creation of the Autism Channel, which houses the magazine and the company's other digital initiatives, such as the Autism-focused Social Entrepreneurship (ESA) programme.

From the 2020s onwards, autism also became the subject of columns in national newspapers. One of these was Dentro do Espectro, by Renata Simões, in O Estado de S. Paulo. Journalist Johanna Nublat published the column Vidas Atípicas, in Folha de S.Paulo.

=== Politics ===
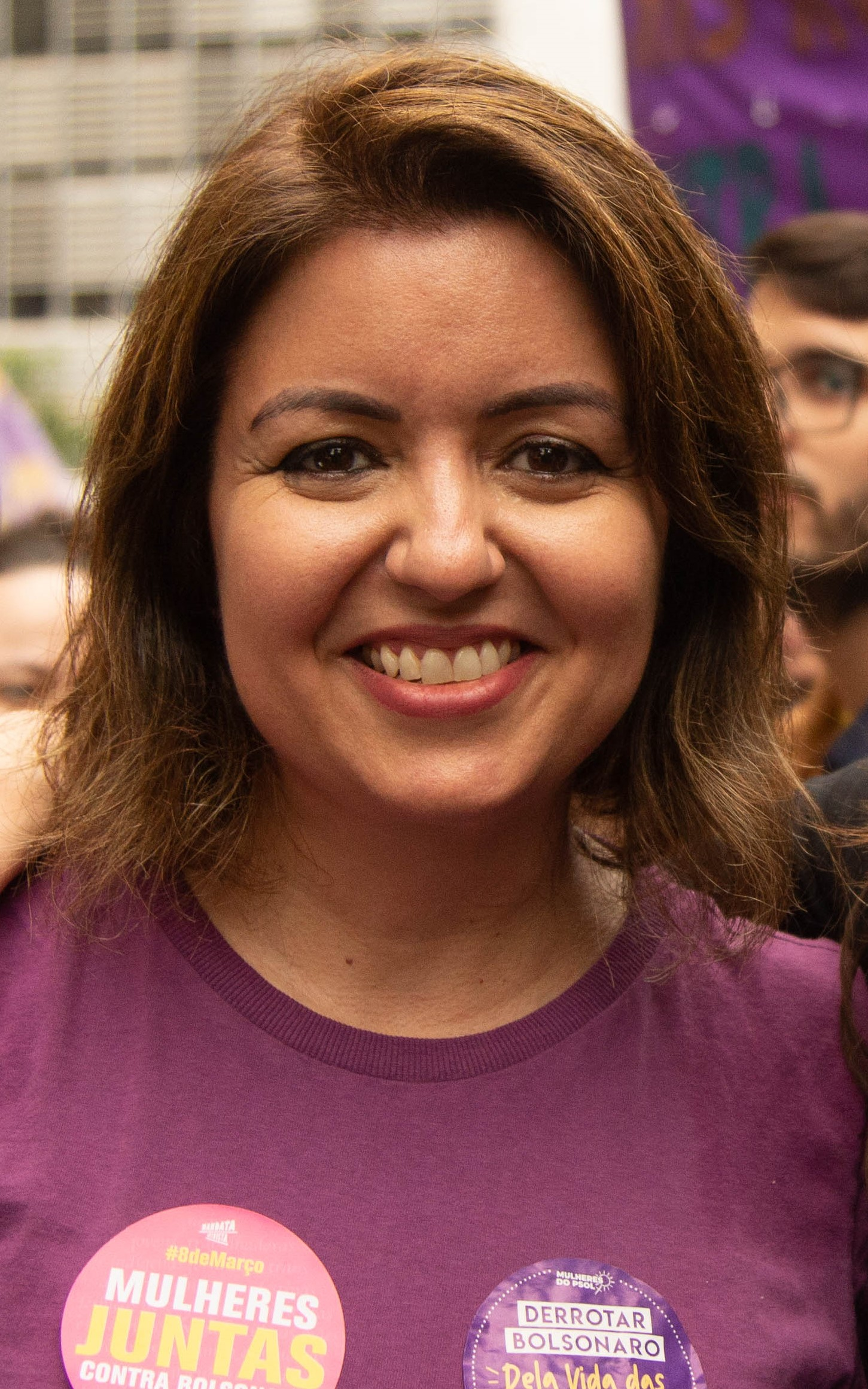
Journalist Andréa Werner was elected to the state legislature more than 10 years after her work in the autism movement.

In addition to the political relations that have taken place over the decades around the autism agenda, activists from the autism scene have begun to insert themselves into political candidacies at municipal, state and federal levels in Brazil. According to data from Agência Pública, 19 candidates for councillor in Brazil's 2020 municipal elections declared themselves autistic. On that occasion, an autistic candidate and father from Guarulhos, who was not self-declared as a person with a disability, was elected. In 2022, after two failed attempts in other elections, journalist Andréa Werner managed to be elected state deputy for the state of São Paulo. Months after her election, Werner publicly shared that she has autistic. The following year, federal deputy Amom Mandel revealed that he had known he was on the autism spectrum since the age of 14 and said that his decision to go public with his diagnosis came about because he had been attacked.

With the popularity of the autism issue in Brazil, activists have begun to argue that politicians are opportunistic when it comes to the cause of autism in order to attract votes from people linked to the cause in election processes and that has occurred excessive presentation of bills. An investigation by the newspaper O Estado de S. Paulo in 2023 identified more than 200 bills and Constitutional Amendment Proposals related to autism.

According to the Brazilian Election Justice, autistic people have preference in the electoral shifts, and it is necessary to declare the diagnosis to the president of the polling station.

=== Sports ===
As in most countries, sports are also part of the routine and daily life of autistic people, whether in the context of education or the cultural elements associated with sporting activities. In the educational scenario, physical education has been pointed out as a way of paying attention to aspects such as psychomotricity, cognitive and bodily development, as well as the motor coordination of autistic people, who are generally considered to be clumsy. On the other hand, as a generally social activity, taking part in these activities can be considered a challenge for some Brazilian autistic people.

In the 2020s, in the context of football, autistic people began to develop autism-focused fans. The first case was the Autistas Alvinegros, from Sport Club Corinthians Paulista, who founded an adult autistic supporters' club in 2022. The initiative has gained ground in several Brazilian clubs, both in the creation of such supporters' clubs and in the adaptation of stadiums with accessibility and sensory booths, as well as the use of autism symbols on the uniforms of first-team players.

In 2022, the Federal Government launched the TEAtivo programme, with a focus on physical activities for autistic children and adolescents. Autism is still the subject of events, courses and actions promoted by national institutions focused on disability, such as the Brazilian Paralympic Committee.

=== Videos and podcasts ===
The first channel about autism produced by an autistic person in Brazil was by Nelson Marra, active between 2015 and 2016. Since 2015, channels have emerged starring figures such as Sophia Mendonça, Selma Sueli Silva, Marcos Petry, Leo Akira, Willian Chimura and Thais Cardoso. Among professionals, the likes of Mayra Gaiato, Clay Brites, Lucelmo Lacerda and Thiago Lopes have stood out.

The first podcast about autism in Brazil was Rádio Autismo, launched in 2007 and produced by Casa da Esperança. In 2014, the organisation also created the Autismo Brasil Podcast, which was active until 2017. In 2018, the first podcast made solely by autistic people was launched, Introvertendo. Over the years, other productions of the genre have also emerged, such as Lógica Autista and Atípicas. In 2023, the Esquizofrenoias podcast released Amanda no Espectro, an exclusive season about autism.

=== Films and series ===
Autism in Brazil has been represented in multiple films, series, soap operas, documentaries and other audiovisual productions, whether they focus on the diagnosis or feature autistic characters. One of the highlights was the character Benê, from Malhação: Viva a Diferença, also represented in the series As Five. In 2013, the soap opera Amor à Vida featured the character Linda. The production's approach to the construction of the character was criticised. In 2019, the adaptation Éramos Seis featured the autistic character Justina.

With regard to films and documentaries, works such as Em um mundo interior (2018), which dealt with the experiences of multiple autistic people, and Meu Amigo Lorenzo (2024), about the friendship between a filmmaker and an autistic teenager.

== See also ==
- Epidemiology of autism
