= Lucas Gómez =

Lucas Gómez may refer to:

- Lucas Gómez (footballer) (born 1987), Argentine footballer
- Lucas Gómez (tennis) (born 1995), Mexican tennis player

== See also ==
- Lucas Gomes (disambiguation)
