= Lucas Gomes =

Lucas Gomes can refer to:

- Lucas Gomes Arcanjo (1971–2016), Brazilian police officer, murder victim
- Lucas Leite (born 1982), Brazilian grappler
- Lucas Gomes (footballer, born 1990) (1990–2016), Brazilian footballer
- Lucas Farias (born 1994), Brazilian footballer
- Lucas Gomes (footballer, born 1995), Brazilian footballer
- Lucas Rodrigues Manardo Gomes (born 199), Brazilian futsal player
