= Introvertendo =

Brazilian podcast

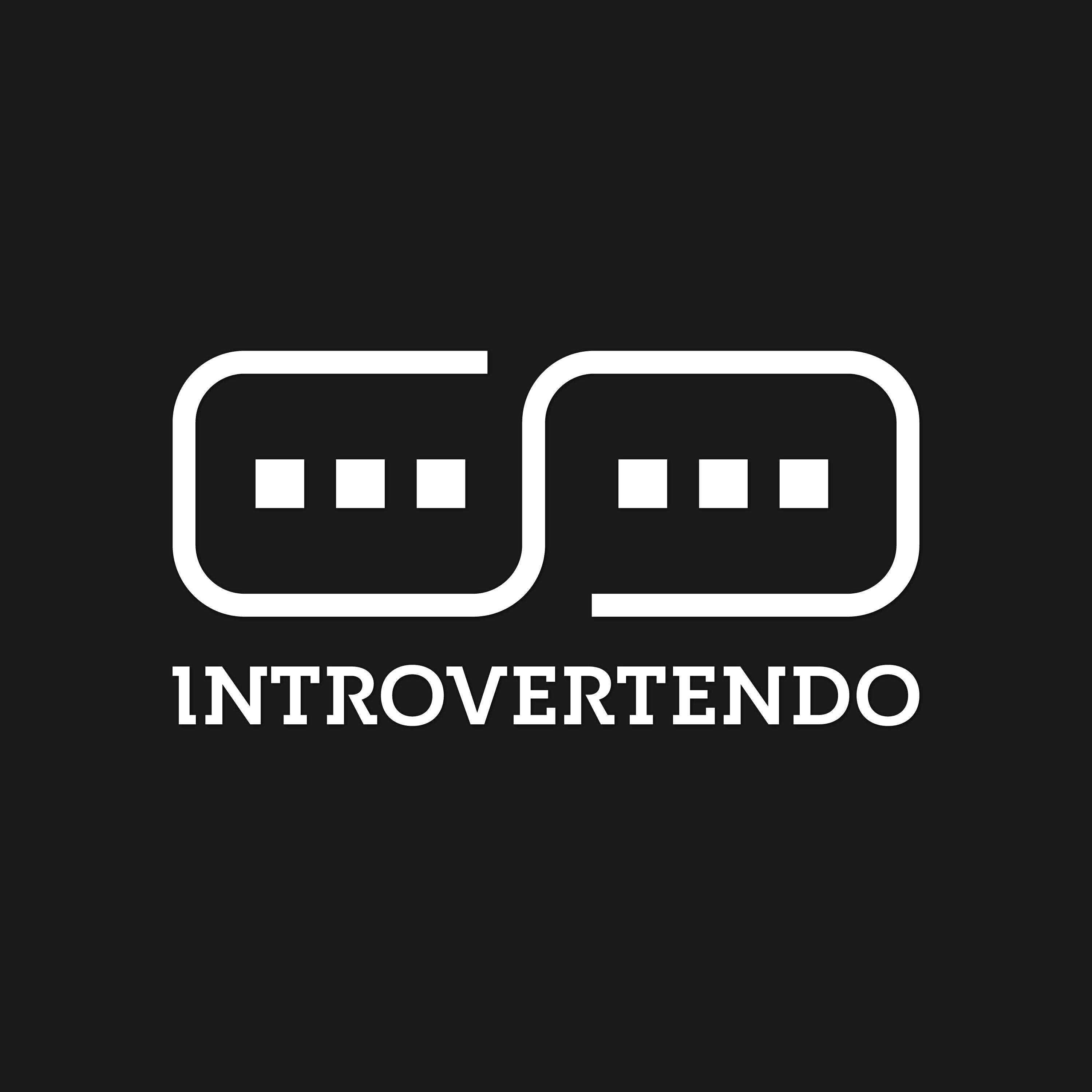

Presentation
- Hosted by: Brendaly Januário; Gustavo Borges; Marx Osório
- Genre: Mental health
- Directed by: Tiago Abreu
- Language: Portuguese
- Updates: Weekly
- Length: 40 minutes
- Country of origin: Goiânia, Brazil

Production
- Direction: Nicolas Melo
- Production: NAIA Autismo
- Theme music composed by: Adriano Quadros
- Audio format: MP3
- No. of episodes: 261

Publication
- Original release: 11 May 2018
- Provider: NAIA Autismo

Related
- Related shows: Podcast com Som; Inclusive

Introvertendo, occasionally credited as Introvertendo - Autismo por Autistas (In portuguese: Introverting - Autism by Autistics), is a Brazilian podcast launched in May 2018. With content about autism, it became notable for being the first podcast made by autistic people in Brazil.

Originally created by autistic students from the Federal University of Goiás, Introvertendo addressed autism issues in adult life. The programme began its activities independently, with weekly episodes related to autism and other topics of interest to the members, all presented by Tiago Abreu. In 2020, after changes in the podcast's staff, other members started presenting it. That same year, the podcast began to be produced by Superplayer & Co, and its audience grew, coming to be considered one of the best programmes of 2020 in a portuguese list by Apple Podcasts. In 2025, the show was revived with new hosts — Brendaly Januário, Gustavo Borges, and Marx Osório — under the production of the Núcleo de Arte e Inclusão do Autista (NAIA Autismo).

Throughout its history, Introvertendo has become known as one of the forerunners in the discussion of autism by autistic people in Brazil on the podcasting scene, which has influenced later productions in the same format. The debate on topics such as cultural representations and sexuality from an autistic perspective has come to be seen as a different way of observing the daily lives of people on the autism spectrum. The podcast has a range of accessibility features, especially on its website, which includes audio description, transcription of all episodes and a Brazilian Sign Language plug-in.

== History ==
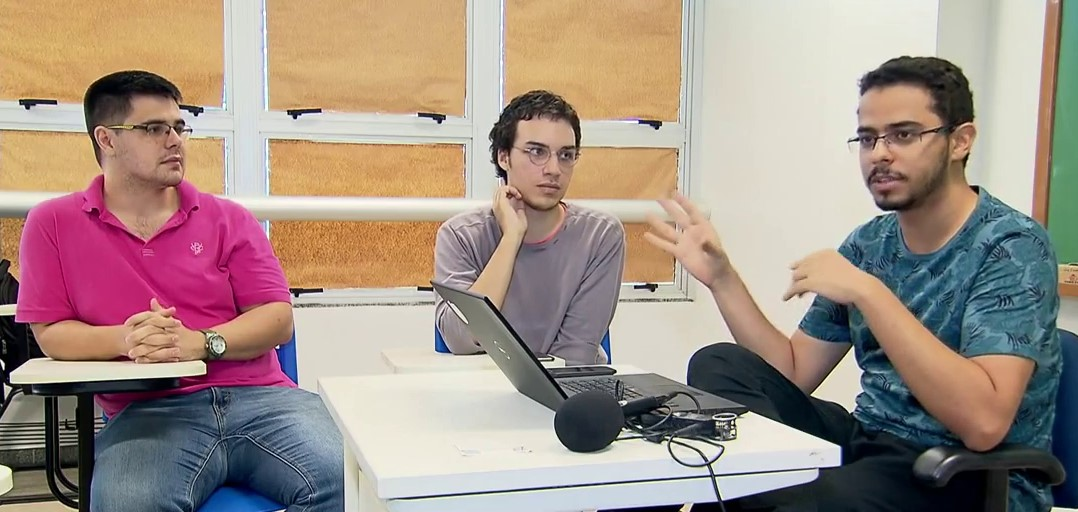
Otávio, Luca and Tiago in an interview (2018).

In April 2016, a therapeutic group for people diagnosed with Asperger syndrome, an autism spectrum disorder, was created at the Federal University of Goiás, in Goiânia, Brazil. The group was formed by five people – Luca, Marcos, Michael, Otavio and Tiago – that later became the founders of Introvertendo.

The first Introvertendo episode was released in May 2018. It was the first Brazilian podcast produced by autistic people.

In 2019, Introvertendo hosts started publishing in Revista Autismo. In September 2019, Introvertendo received an award from Expocom, delivered by Sociedade Brasileira de Estudos Interdisciplinares da Comunicação.

In 2020, Introvertendo was no longer an independent production, and started being distributed by Superplayer & Co. In March of the same year, a Brazilian Sign Language version of the podcast was launched.

In 2023, the Introvertendo team announced that the programme would come to an end. The final episode aired on 22 September 2023.

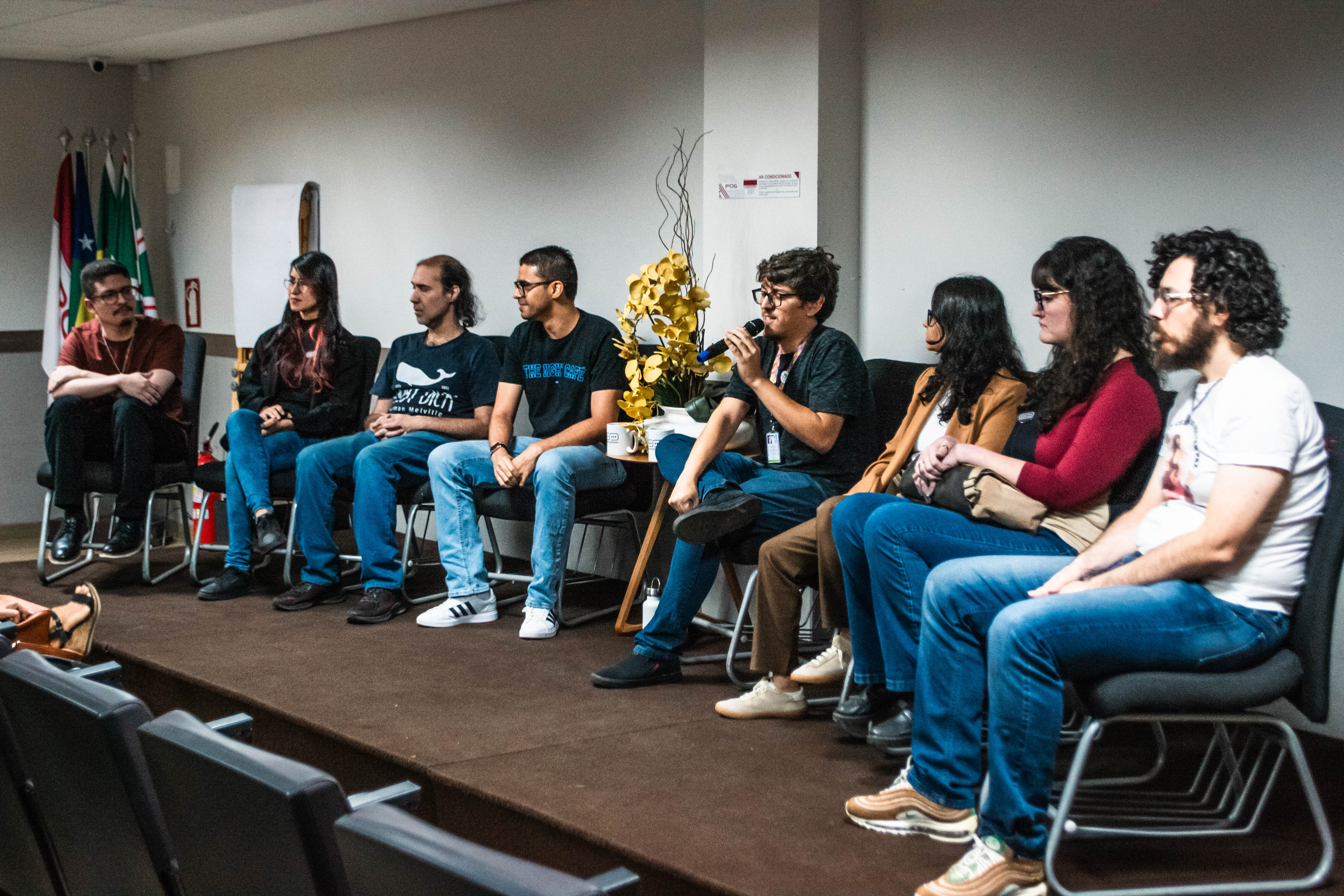
Members of the second generation of Introvertendo during the launch event in Goiânia.

In 2024, Introvertendo received the Orgulho Autista Brasil Award from the Movimento Orgulho Autista Brasil (MOAB) in the category “News coverage broadcast on radio or podcast". Tiago Abreu, one of the podcast’s original founders, considered the possibility of launching a second generation of Introvertendo. He consulted members of the original team, who authorized the idea. The new hosts chosen were Gustavo Borges, Marx Osório, and Brendaly Januário. Adriano Quadros, who had contributed to audio editing during the podcast’s earlier years, returned to lead both audio and video editing. Video production was handled by Nicolas Melo and Alexandre Stacciarini at the studios of Faculdade Realiza, in Aparecida de Goiânia.

The reboot was announced on May 11, 2025, the seventh anniversary of the podcast. The first episode, about autism personal diagnosis, was released on June 18, 2025, coinciding with Autistic Pride Day. The launch was held during the 2nd Adult Autistics Meeting of Goiânia, which included a public screening of the debut episode and a Q&A session with the new team.

== Format ==
Over the years, Introvertendo has been a continuously released podcast, with weekly episodes, usually on Fridays. The structure most often explored by the show was the free conversations between the members, usually on topics that were included in the title of episode. Among the topics most frequently covered by the show were late diagnosis of autism in adults, inclusion at school and university, challenges of social interactions and characteristics of autism. Until the end of 2019, the podcast also explored topics outside of autism, such as episodes on religion, the FIFA World Cup and afterlife. From episode 20 to episode 80, all the episodes with a number ending in 0 dealt with the discography of some artist or band, such as Paul McCartney, David Bowie, Fleetwood Mac, Manic Street Preachers and the britpop movement.

Another feature of the programme was the inclusion of reading emails sent by fans, who could be other autistic people, but also family members, professionals and other people interested in the subject of autism. In 2022, emails were replaced by audios, which could be sent via WhatsApp or Instagram. Introvertendo was available on various podcast download and streaming platforms, such as Apple Podcasts, Spotify, Castbox, Amazon Music and Deezer.

Over the five years, the programme featured more than 150 guests, most of them related to the brazilian autism community. Among the notable names who have appeared in episodes are figures such as Andréa Werner, Márcia Wayna Kambeba, Mauricio de Sousa, Nicolas Brito Sales, Renata Simões and Tito Aureliano. Members of associations and organisations related to autism also appeared on the podcast, such as members of the Movimento Orgulho Autista Brasil (MOAB), Associação Brasileira para a Ação por Direitos das Pessoas Autistas (Abraça), Instituto Autismo & Vida, Associação Nacional para Inclusão das Pessoas Autistas (Ania), Organização Neurodiversa pelos Direitos dos Autistas (Onda) and Núcleo de Arte e Inclusão do Autista (Naia).

== Cast ==
=== Current members ===
Hosts and members

- Brendaly Januário (2025–present)
- Gustavo Borges (2025–present)
- Marx Osório (2025–present)
- João Victor Ramos (2025–present)
- Izabella Pavetits (2025–present)
- Maysa Antunes (2025–present)
- Bruno Frederico Müller (2025–present)

Contributors and collaborators

- Tiago Abreu – general direction, audio and video editing, mixing (2025–present)
- Nicolas Melo – video direction (2025–present)
- Adriano Quadros – audio and video editing, mixing, soundtrack (2025–present)
- Alexandre Stacciarini – video assistant, video editing, design (2025–present)
- Michael Ulian – video assistant, transcription (2025–present)
- Ana Júlia – content planning (2025–present)
- Anderson Gomes – general assistant (2025–present)

=== 2018—2023 members ===
Last members

- Luca Nolasco (2018–2023)
- Michael Ulian (2018–2023)
- Tiago Abreu (2018–2023)
- Thaís Mösken (2018–2023)
- Paulo Alarcón (2018–2023)
- Willian Chimura (2020–2023)
- Carol Cardoso (2021–2023)

Former members

- Abner Mattheus (2018)
- Letícia Lyns (2018)
- Guilherme Pires (2018–2019)
- Marcos Carnielo Neto (2018–2020)
- Yara Delgado (2019–2021)
- Mariana Sousa (2020–2021)
- Otávio Crosara (2018–2023)
