= Pontifical Catholic University of Minas Gerais =

Private university in Belo Horizonte, Brazil

- Pontifícia Universidade Católica de Minas Gerais
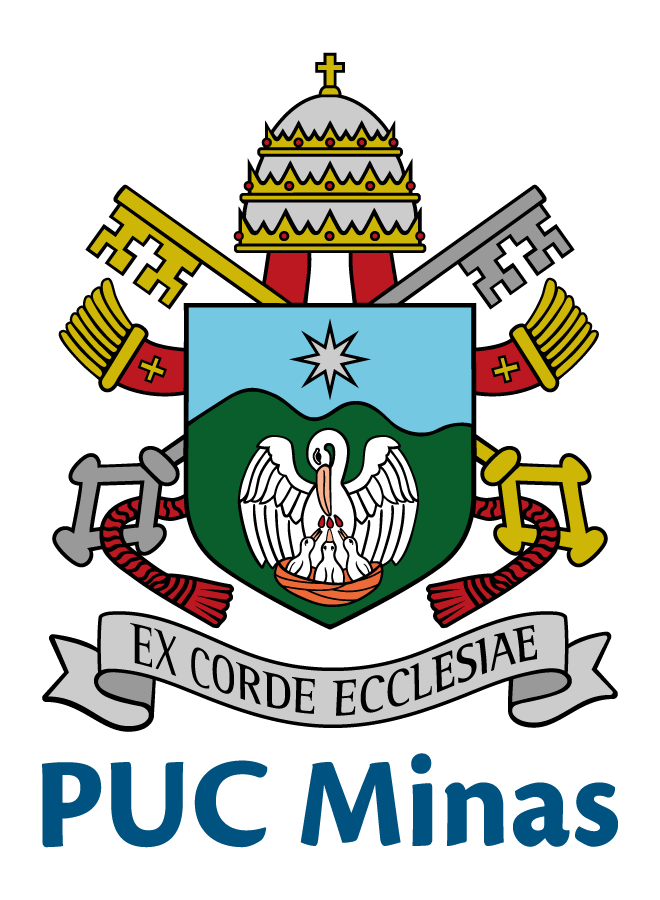
- Coat of arms of the university
- Other names: PUC-MG; PUC Minas
- Motto: Conhecimento que transforma (in english:Knowledge that transforms)
- Type: Private, non-profit
- Established: 12 December 1958
- Affiliations: Roman Catholic Church
- Chancellor: Walmor Oliveira de Azevedo
- Rector: Prof. Dr. Padre Luiz Henrique Eloy e Silva
- Faculty: 1,271
- Administrative staff: 2,959
- Students: 80,078
- Undergraduates: 40,827
- Postgraduates: 39,251
- Location: Belo Horizonte (headquarters), Arcos, Betim, Contagem, Poços de Caldas, Serro, Minas Gerais, Brazil; 10.6500°S 52.9500°W
- Campus: Urban
- Colors: Blue and grey
- Website: pucminas.br

The Pontifical Catholic University of Minas Gerais (Portuguese: Pontifícia Universidade Católica de Minas Gerais, PUC-MG) is a private and non-profit Brazilian Catholic university in Belo Horizonte, state of Minas Gerais. In 2006, 2010, 2011, 2013 and 2014, PUC-MG was chosen the best private university in Brazil. It is maintained by the Catholic Archdiocese of Belo Horizonte.

== Overview ==
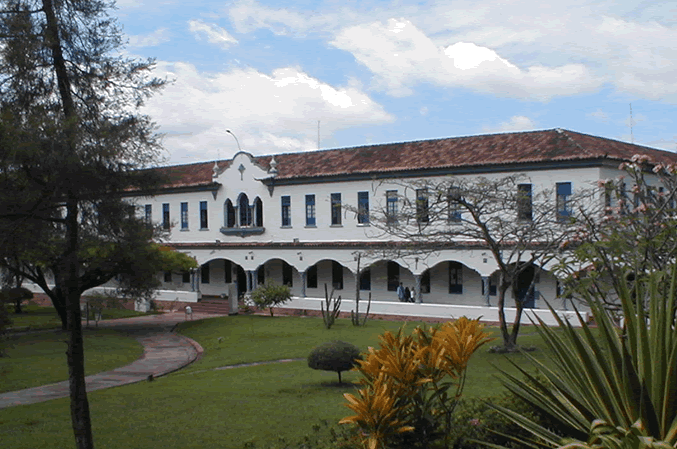
Campus in Coração Eucarístico district

The Catholic University is a higher education institution in Minas Gerais, where it owns more than 100 buildings to host labs, libraries, a museum, a TV channel, a long-distance teaching center, multimedia rooms, theaters, auditoriums, a veterinary hospital, a clinic for psychotherapy, dental and psychological treatment and others.

One of the best universities in Brazil, PUC-MG was rated 4 by the Brazilian Ministry of Education index for higher education schools. The highest rating is 5 which is almost exclusively awarded to public universities.

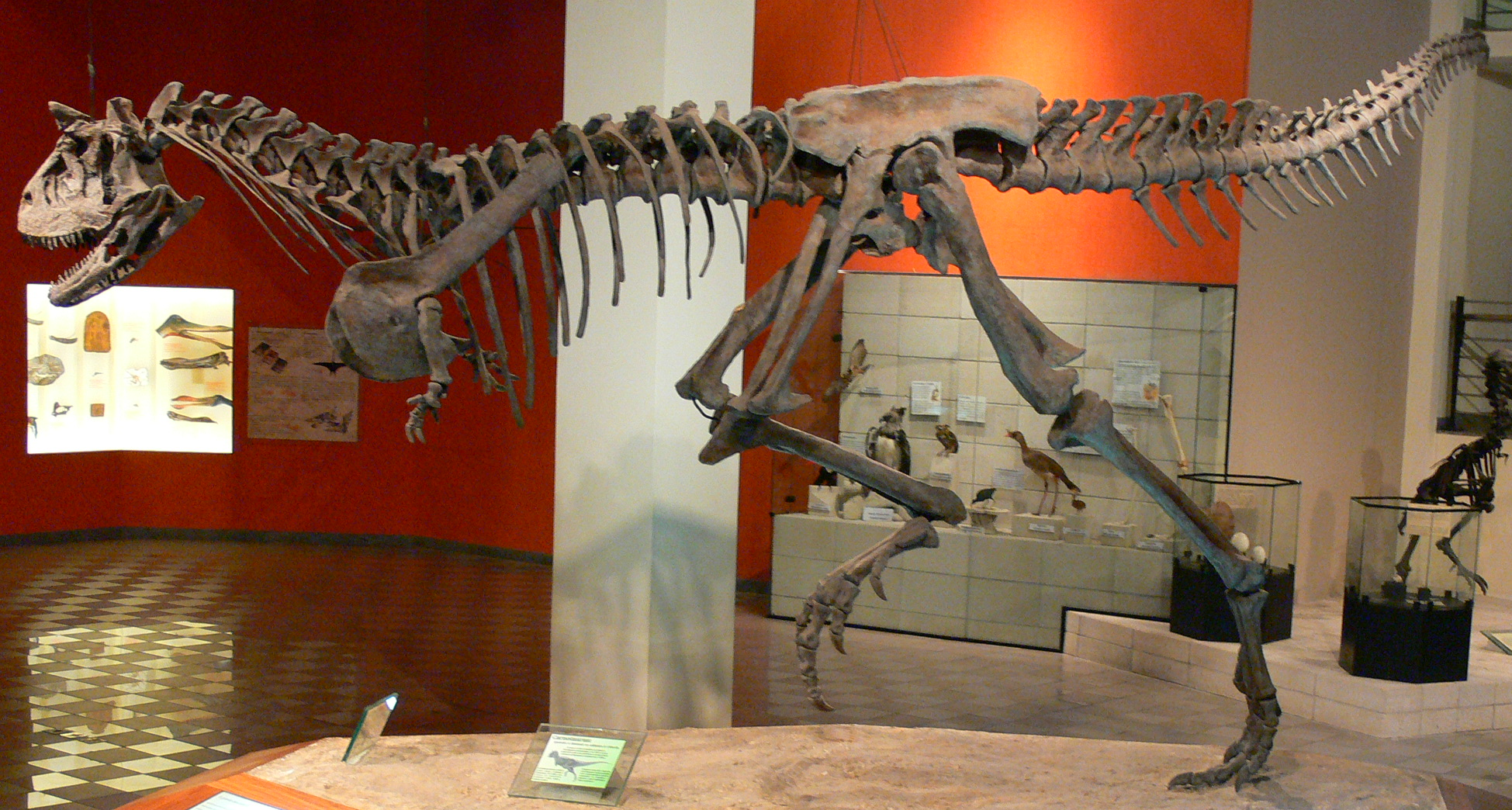
Carnotaurus Skeleton replica in PUC MG Museum of Natural Sciences

The PUC-MG received, for the second consecutive year, an award given by the Federation of Industries of Minas Gerais (FIEMG) by Euvaldo Lodi Institute for having the best practices of training and the integration of students in companies. The award was received by the coordinator of the Integrated Training University, Professor Evanilde Maria Martins, at a ceremony held in the auditorium of FIEMG.

In 2003, the PUC Minas was the first private university in Brazil to house a laboratory to perform climatological studies. It is the Centre of Excellence in Climatology (Centro de Climatologia PUC Minas TempoClima), which was created through a partnership between the university and Cemig (Companhia Energética de Minas Gerais). The TempoClima Center features equipment for receiving weather information and one laboratory course with emphasis on Geography.

Its objective is the development of weather forecasts three days in advance for the 853 municipalities of Minas Gerais, warning of severe storms and predictions for use by agriculture, road and rail transport, electricity, industry and tourism.

== Campuses ==
Besides the headquarters in Coração Eucarístico district, in Belo Horizonte, PUC-MG owns campuses in the districts of Barreiro, São Gabriel and Lourdes and in the cities of Arcos, Betim, Contagem, Poços de Caldas and Serro.

== Notable professors and alumni ==
=== Alumni ===
Notable Pontifical Catholic University of Minas Gerais alumni include:

- Cármen Lúcia, Chief Justice of the Supreme Federal Court
- José Bonifácio Borges de Andrada (pt), former Attorney General of Brazil
- Clésio Andrade, Senator from Minas Gerais and businessman
- Aécio Neves, economist and Governor of Minas Gerais
- Fernando Pimentel, economist, and Governor of Minas Gerais
- Rodrigo Pacheco, Lawyer, Senator for Minas Gerais, and President of the Brazilian Senate
- Chico Pinheiro, former journalist of TV Globo
- Adriana Araújo, journalist of Record TV
- Patrus Ananias, lawyer and House Representative for Minas Gerais
- Alberto Taveira Corrêa, prelate of the Roman Catholic Church
- Wladimir Ribeiro, a former international butterfly and backstroke swimmer
- Dora Castanheira, volleyball player
- Natália Guimarães, Brazilian actress, TV host, journalist and model
- Selma Sueli Silva, author, businesswoman, internet celebrity and former radio personality
- Andréa Werner, journalist and politician.

== See also ==
- Brazil University Rankings
- Universities and Higher Education in Brazil
