= Aécio Neves =

Brazilian politician

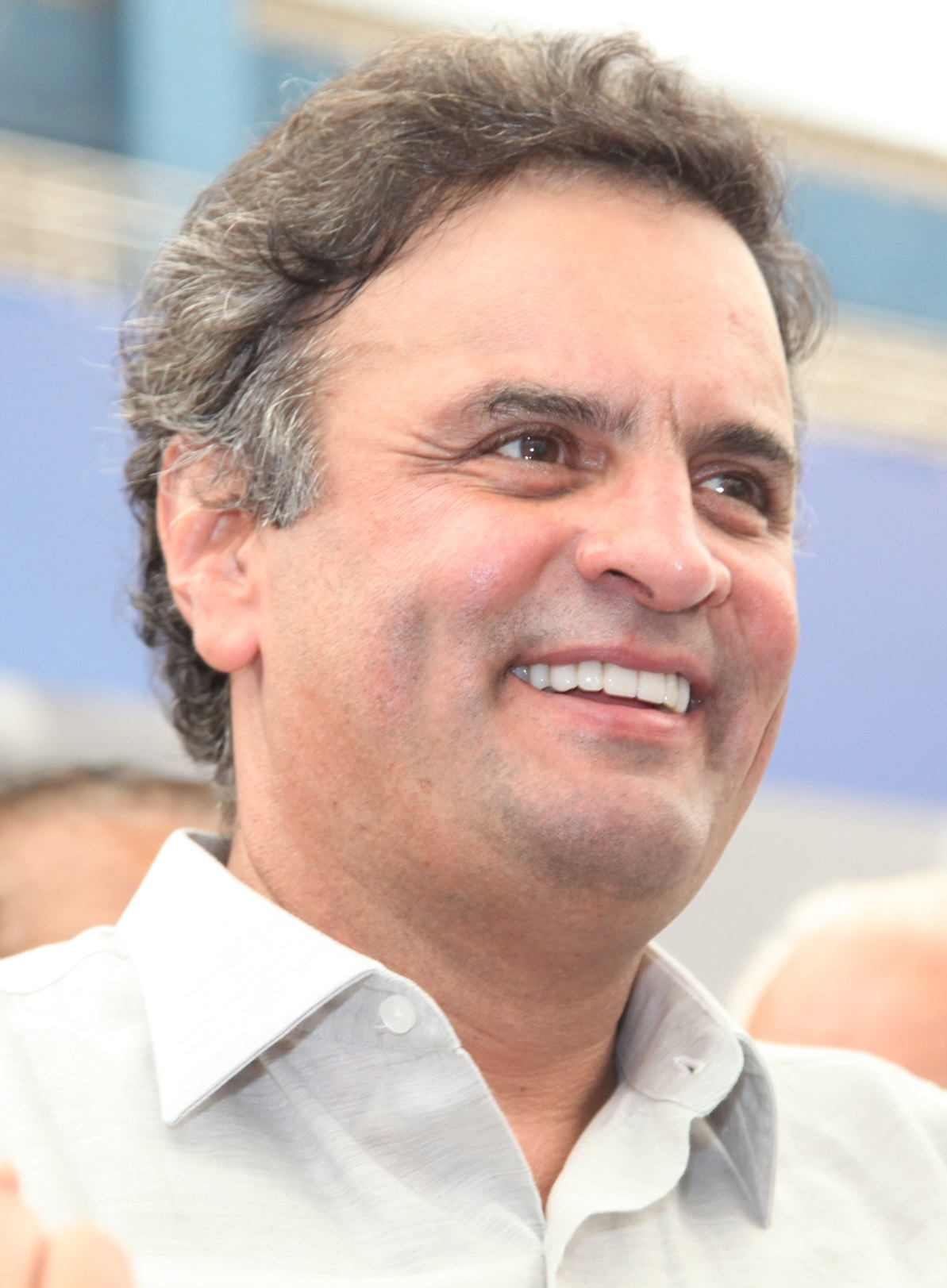
- Neves in 2014

Member of the Chamber of Deputies
- Incumbent
- Assumed office 1 February 2019
- Constituency: Minas Gerais
- In office 1 February 1987 – 17 December 2002
- Constituency: Minas Gerais

Senator for Minas Gerais
- In office 1 February 2011 – 1 February 2019
- Preceded by: Eduardo Azeredo
- Succeeded by: Rodrigo Pacheco

Governor of Minas Gerais
- In office 1 January 2003 – 31 March 2010
- Vice Governor: Clésio Andrade (2003–07); Antônio Anastasia (2007–10)
- Preceded by: Itamar Franco
- Succeeded by: Antônio Anastasia

President of the Chamber of Deputies
- In office 14 February 2001 – 17 December 2002
- Preceded by: Michel Temer
- Succeeded by: João Paulo Cunha
Party offices
National President of the Brazilian Social Democracy Party
Incumbent
Assumed office 27 November 2025
Preceded by	Marconi Perillo
In office 18 May 2013 – 18 May 2017
Preceded by	Sérgio Guerra
Succeeded by	Tasso Jereissati (Acting)

Personal details
- Born: Aécio Neves da Cunha; 10 March 1960 (age 66) Belo Horizonte, Minas Gerais, Brazil
- Party: PSDB (1988–present)
- Other political affiliations: PMDB (1980–1988)
- Spouses: Andréa Falcão (m. 1991; div. 1998) Letícia Weber (m. 2013)
- Children: 3
- Relatives: Tancredo Neves (grandfather)
- Education: Pontifical Catholic University of Minas Gerais (B.Ec.)

Aécio Neves da Cunha (Note: He should be called/styled Mr. Neves da Cunha, however, due to the fame of his maternal grandfather, he is best known only as Mr. Neves.) (Brazilian Portuguese: [aˈɛsiw ˈnɛviz da ˈkũɲɐ]; born 10 March 1960) is a Brazilian economist, politician and president of the Brazilian Social Democracy Party (PSDB). He was the 17th Governor of Minas Gerais from 1 January 2003 to 31 March 2010, and is currently a member of the Brazilian Chamber of Deputies. He lost in the runoff presidential election against Dilma Rousseff in 2014.

== Biography ==
Born in Belo Horizonte in the state of Minas Gerais, Neves was the youngest governor in the state's history. He began his political career as a personal secretary of his grandfather, Tancredo Neves, who was elected President of Brazil in 1985, but died before taking office. Aécio Neves served the World Federation of Democratic Youth in 1985 and four terms as an elected deputy for the Brazilian Social Democracy Party in the Federal Chamber of Deputies from 1 February 1987 to 14 December 2002, representing Minas Gerais. He was also President of the Chamber of Deputies in 2001/02.

As governor, Aécio Neves introduced the "Management Shock", a set of sweeping reforms designed to bring the state budget under control by reducing government expenditure and promoting investment. Having been tipped as a potential candidate for the Brazilian Presidential elections in 2010, Neves announced his intention to stand aside from the race at the end of 2009. He ran for the Brazilian Federal Senate instead, and was elected a Senator representing the State of Minas Gerais. He took office as a Senator of the Republic on 1 February 2011.

Aécio was a columnist at Brazilian newspaper Folha de S.Paulo until June 2014. On 5 October 2014, he received the second largest number of votes (at 34%) in the Brazilian presidential election, placing him in the runoff election to be held on 26 October 2014, against the first place candidate and former Brazilian president, Dilma Rousseff, who received 42% of the votes.

=== Early years ===
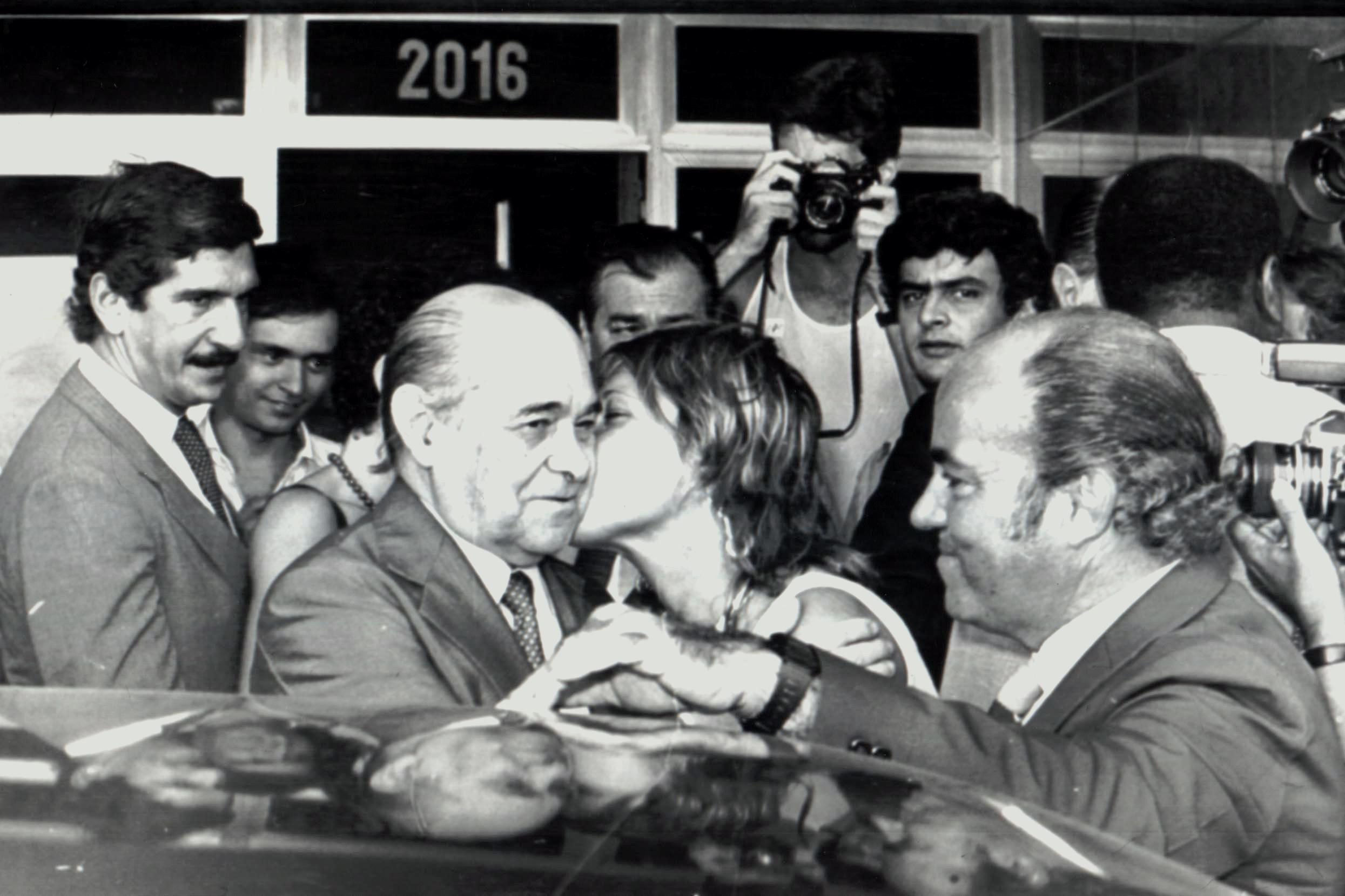
Tancredo Neves and Aécio Neves (behind right) in 1984, during the presidential elections.

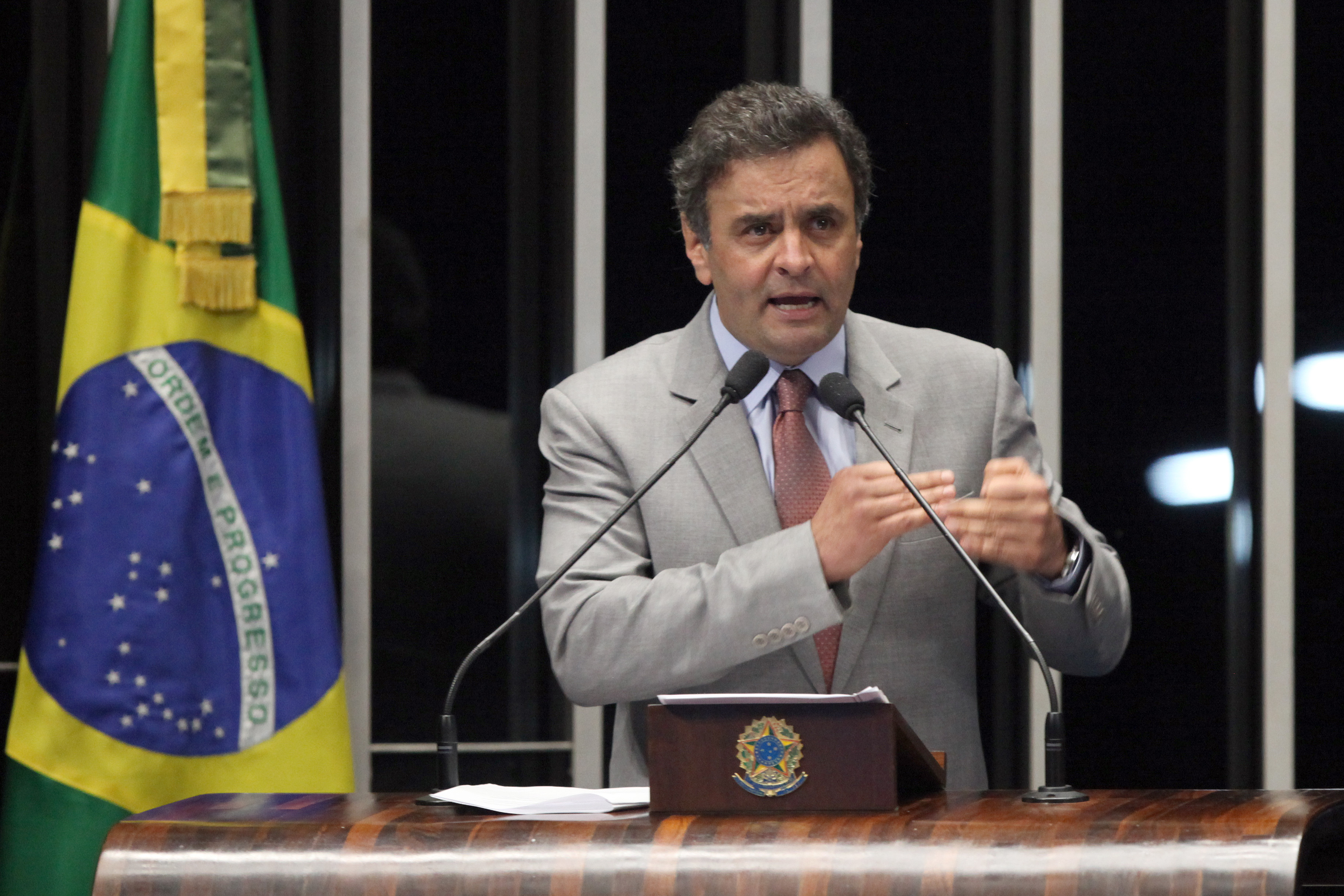
Aécio at the Senate on 25 June 2013

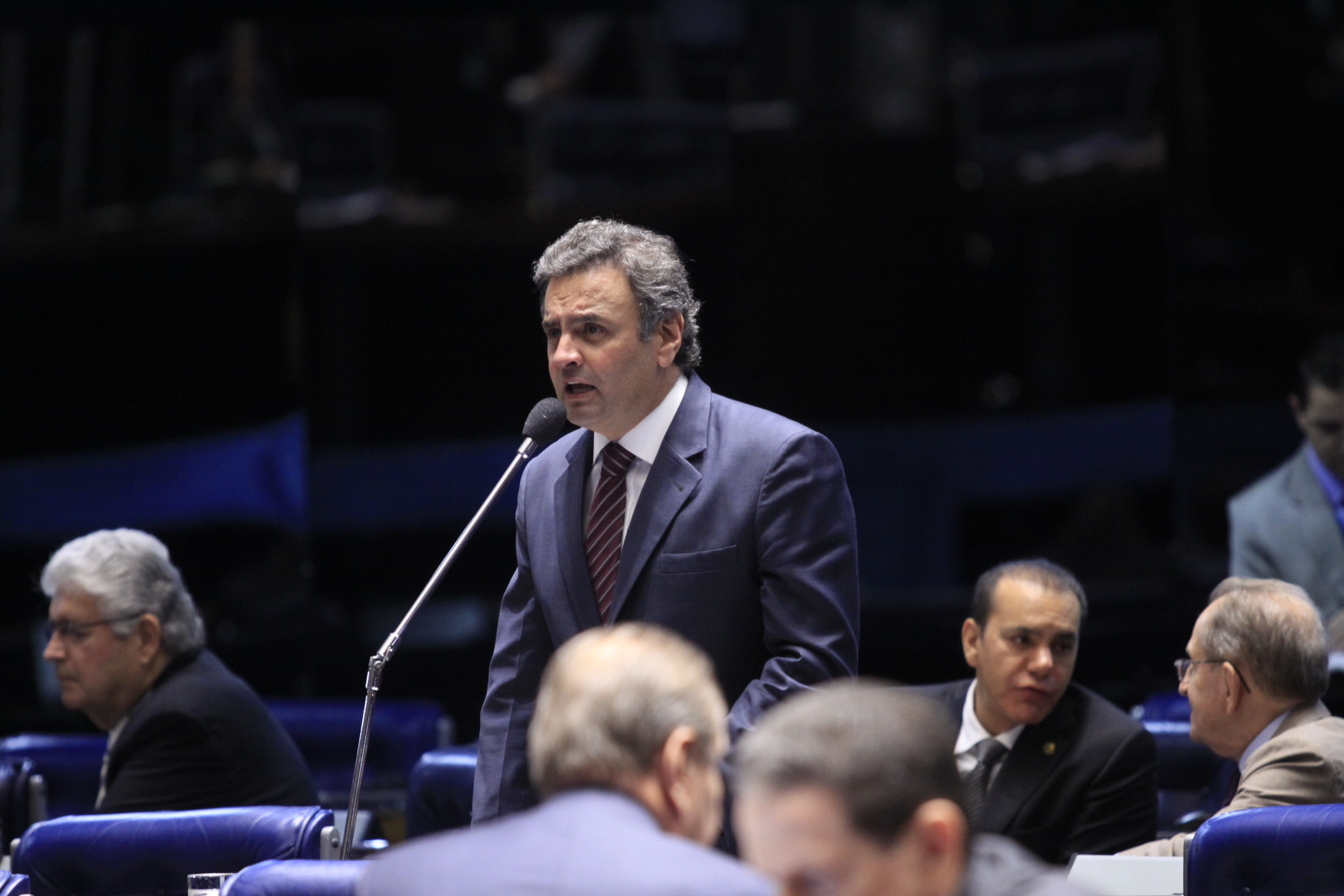
Aécio is giving a speech at the Senate in April 2013.

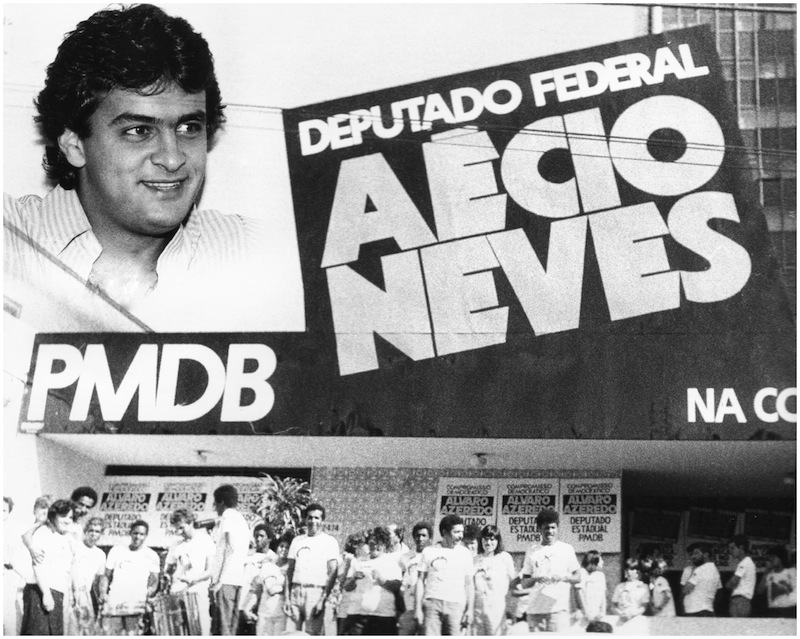
Aecio's electoral committee in his first federal deputy election in 1986.

Aécio Neves is son of politician Aécio Ferreira da Cunha and Inês Maria. Neves hails from a family of traditional politicians in Minas Gerais. His maternal grandfather, Tancredo Neves, was a key figure in the re-democratization of Brazil, served as governor of Minas Gerais and elected via electoral college. Neves’ paternal grandfather, Tristão Ferreira da Cunha, and his father Aécio Cunha were congressmen representing the state of Minas Gerais. His paternal grandfather, Tristão Ferreira da Cunha, a native of Teófilo Otoni, a northern city in Minas Gerais, was also a politician as well as a lawyer and a professor. He was Secretary of Agriculture, Industry and Commerce in the state government of Juscelino Kubitschek (1951–1955). Aécio Cunha, son of Tristão and father of Aécio, was state deputy between 1955 and 1963 and federal representative between 1963 and 1987.

Neves moved to Rio de Janeiro with his parents when his was 10 years old. He had his first job at the Administrative Council for Economic Defense of the Ministry of Justice in Rio de Janeiro. In 1981 his maternal grandfather convinced Neves to return to Belo Horizonte. He moved into an apartment that he shared with his maternal grandfather and father and transferred to Pontifical Catholic University of Minas Gerais, where he studied economics.

In 1982 Aécio began working in his grandfather's campaign for the state government, attending meetings and rallies in more than 300 towns. Tancredo Neves was elected governor of Minas Gerais, and in 1983, Aécio served as his private secretary. In the following years, Aécio participated in the movement "Diretas Já" and in Tancredo Neves’ presidential campaign. Tancredo Neves won the Brazilian presidency via electoral college in 1985. After the elections Aécio Neves accompanied the president-elect on visits to democratic countries, a political strategy used to enhance the retransition to democracy in Brazil. They visited the United States and US President Ronald Reagan, France with President François Mitterrand, Italy and Sandro Pertini, Prime Minister Bettino Craxi, King Juan Carlos of Spain and Pope John Paul II. Aécio Neves was appointed Secretary of Special Affairs of the Presidency by President-elect Tancredo Neves, but due to his early death, and José Sarney assuming office the job was cancelled.

=== Congressman ===
In 1986 he ran for the National Constituent Assembly as a member of Brazilian Democratic Movement Party (PMDB). He received 236,019 votes, which at the time was the largest vote for a congressman elected from Minas Gerais. In the Constituent Assembly he became vice the chairman of the Sovereignty and Rights and Guarantees of Men and Women and was also one of the authors of the amendment that turned Brazil's voting age to 16 years.

In his second term (1991–1995) he voted for the impeachment of President Fernando Collor de Mello. In 1992 Aécio ran for mayor of Belo Horizonte, but was defeated. It was his only electoral defeat until his unsuccessful bid for the Presidency in 2014. Neves was reelected to Congress for a third term in 1994. The term lasted from 1995 to 1998, during which he was elected president of PSDB Minas Gerais. In 1997, he became PSDB's leader in Congress.

=== President of the Chamber of Deputies ===
In 2001 Neves was elected president of the Chamber of Deputies. He had run against Aloízio Mercadante (PT-SP), Inocêncio Oliveira (PFL-PE), Valdemar Costa Neto (PL-SP) and Nelson Marquezelli (PTB-SP) and received more votes than all his competitors combined. He serves as president of Congress from 14 February 2001 until 17 December 2002. As president of Congress he assumed, temporarily, the presidency of Brazil starting on 26 June 2001.

Under his leadership he promoted the so-called Ethical Package, a set of measures aimed at moralizing parliamentary action. Neves led the vote of the end of congressional immunity for common crimes, the establishment of a code of ethics and propriety and the Ethics Committee. He also provided the processing and votes of bills on the Internet so that the public could monitor the processing of the legislative process. He also cut congressional spending and sent saved money back to the federal government.

=== Senator ===
Neves, along with former President Itamar Franco, was elected senator on 3 October 2010 with 7,565,377 votes. Neves is a member of the Senate committees on political reform, constitutional affairs, justice and citizenship. He participated in the Economic Affairs Committee. As a parliamentarian Neves has advocated the development of a new federal pact, the strengthening of parliamentary action with the restriction on the use of provisional measures, the reduction of taxes and the change in the calculation used for payment of mining royalties.

On 18 May 2017, Neves was suspended from the position of Senator by Minister of the Supreme Court Edson Fachin, at the request of the Attorney General's office that also requested his arrest after the information that he requested R$2 million from the owners of meat processing company JBS. On 30 June 2017, Justice Marco Aurélio Mello authorized the return of Aécio to the Senate. On 26 September 2017, Judges Luís Roberto Barroso, Rosa Weber, and Luiz Fux suspended the Senator again. Vice-president of the Federal Senate, Senator Cássio Cunha Lima stated that he "believe[s] that the Senate will take down the decision of the Supreme Court", justifying that the decision of the Court turned the suspension of Aécio into a house arrest, which needs authorization of the Senate.

On 17 October 2017, Federal Senate voted 44 to 26 for the return of Senator Neves to his seat.

On 17 April 2018, the Supreme Court accepted a judicial complaint to investigate Neves for corruption and obstruction of justice after he was recorded requesting R$2 million from JBS and after his family members got the money.

== Main achievements ==
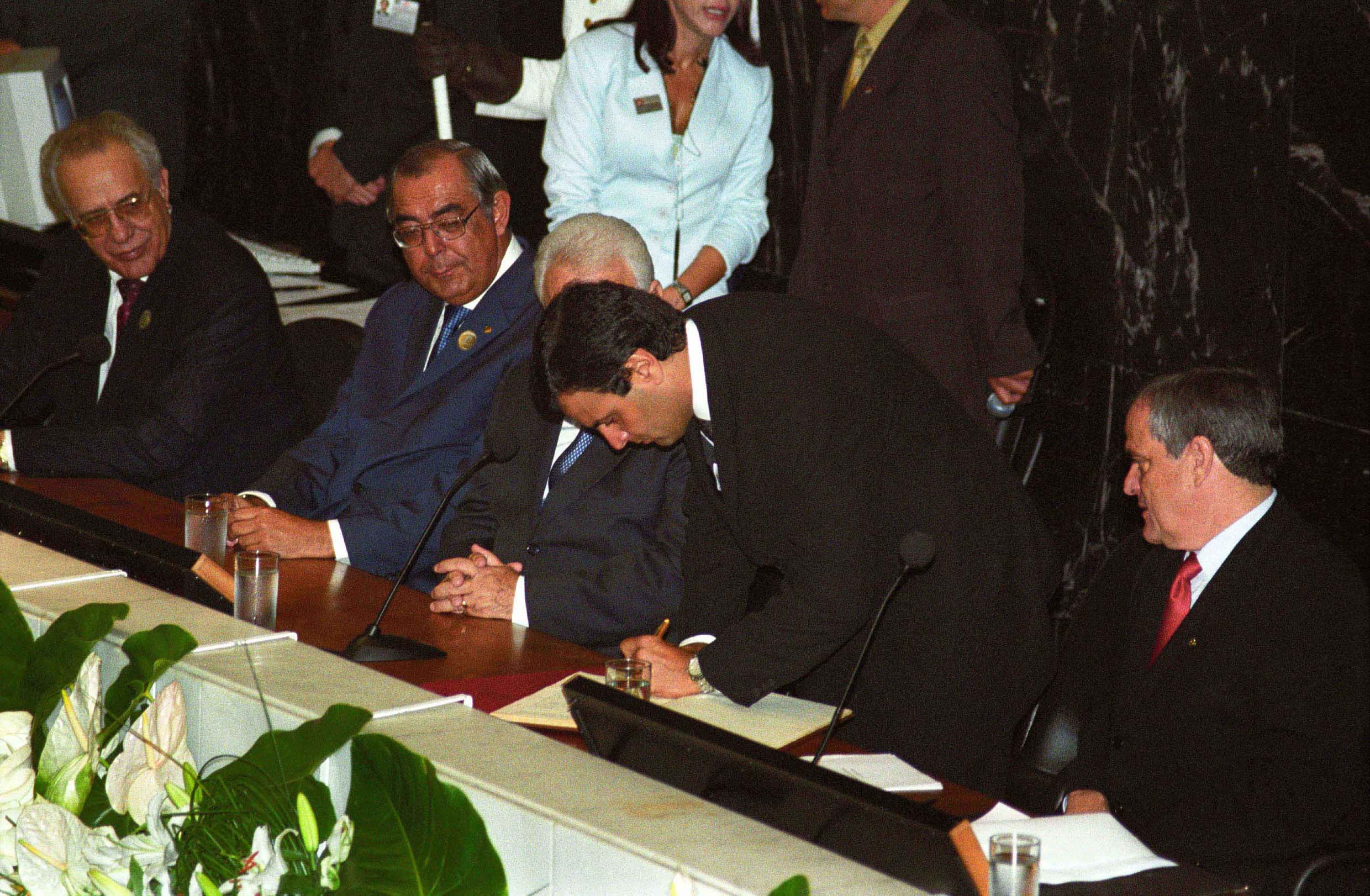
Neves upon becoming governor of Minas Gerais on 1 January 2003.

=== Governor ===
On 6 October 2002 Neves was elected governor of Minas Gerais. On 28 March 2006, Aécio announced his candidacy and soon after was reelected, Neves became the second longest-serving governor in state history. The Government of Minas Gerais expropriated a piece of land owned by Neves's great-uncle, estimated at R$1 million. His great-uncle requested R$20 million for the indemnification. The State appealed the value in the Justice and the indemnification was annulled.

As governor he hired 98,000 public employees without any public selection and with allegedly illegal procedures. During his administration, the salaries of school teachers in Minas Gerais reached the lowest level of the whole country. The basic salary of medical doctors was R$1,050, the second lowest of the country.

Neves attempted to censor Google, Yahoo!, and Bing search results related to rumors about drug abuse and misappropriation of public health funds.

=== Social development ===
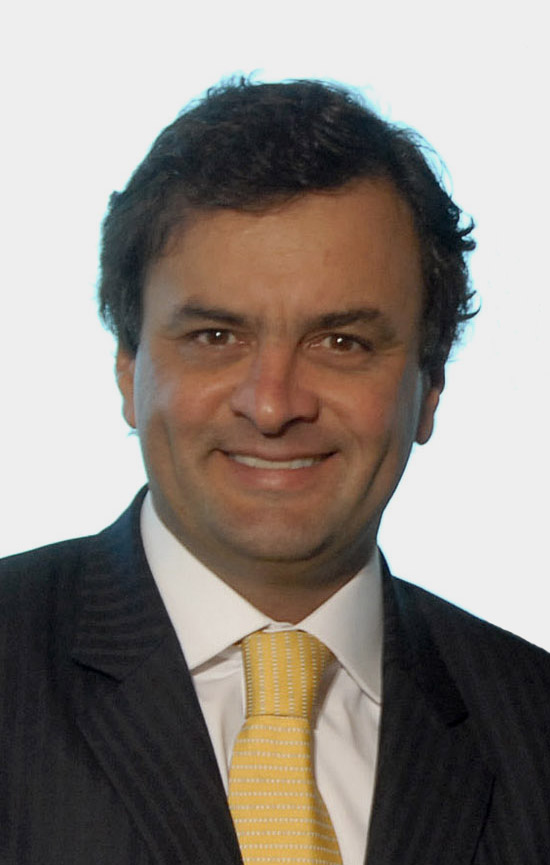
Governor of Minas Gerais in 2007.

Among the social programs implemented by Aécio are the Project to Combat Rural Poverty (PCRP), developed with total funding of US$70 million, divided into two payments of US$35 million, from the World Bank. The project covers 188 municipalities in Northern Minas Gerais and some districts. The communities are responsible for organizing and defining its priorities. The projects range from the construction of kindergartens to the establishment of handicraft associations or fish farms.

Neves launched the Youth Savings Program in March 2007 with the goal to support 50,000 high school students from the state system who live in areas of high social risk by 2010. Every student received a sum of R$3,000 at the end of the third year of high school, which can be used in their professional career. To receive the money, the high school graduates must take a series of commitments on school performance, such as attendance, good grades, and personal behavior. They cannot, for example, engage in criminal activity and should perform community service. Over 30,000 students have participated in the program and have received English classes, computer skills and professional training.

=== Transportation ===
The Neves government created the Paving Program Links and Access Road program in 2004 with own resources and funding from the Interamerican Development Bank. The program included the paving of accesses to 225 municipalities that had previously been connected only by dirt roads.

=== Administrative City Tancredo Neves ===
Administrative City Tancredo Neves, built to be the new headquarters of State Government, was inaugurated by Neves on 4 March 2010, on what would have been Tancredo Neves’ 100th birthday. The set of five buildings was designed by Oscar Niemeyer and is located on the grounds of the former Hipódromo Serra Verde on the border of the municipalities of Belo Horizonte, Vespasiano and Santa Luzia.

=== Management Shock ===
One of the main points of Aécio's government is the so-called "Management Shock", a set of measures to make the government spend less on itself and invest more in people. In the long term, Management Shock seeks to reduce corruption and to improve the quality and productivity of state government bodies. The program also provides investment in the training of civil servants of the state.

In 2003, Neves created "Stay Alive", a program to reduce homicides in the state. Per year, 13,000 high-risk students and young adults from areas with the highest homicides throughout the state participate in the program. In the areas the program covers, homicide rates have dropped more than 50%. The program focuses on workshops on sport, culture, productive inclusion and communication to divert young people from crime.

On 21 January 2009, the state government inaugurated the "Reference Center for Pregnant Women in Jail", built in Vespasiano - MG. This is the first prison in the country to house pregnant inmates and their babies until they complete one year. Aécio launched the first prison in the country built and administered through a public-private partnership.

== Candidacy for Presidency in 2014 ==
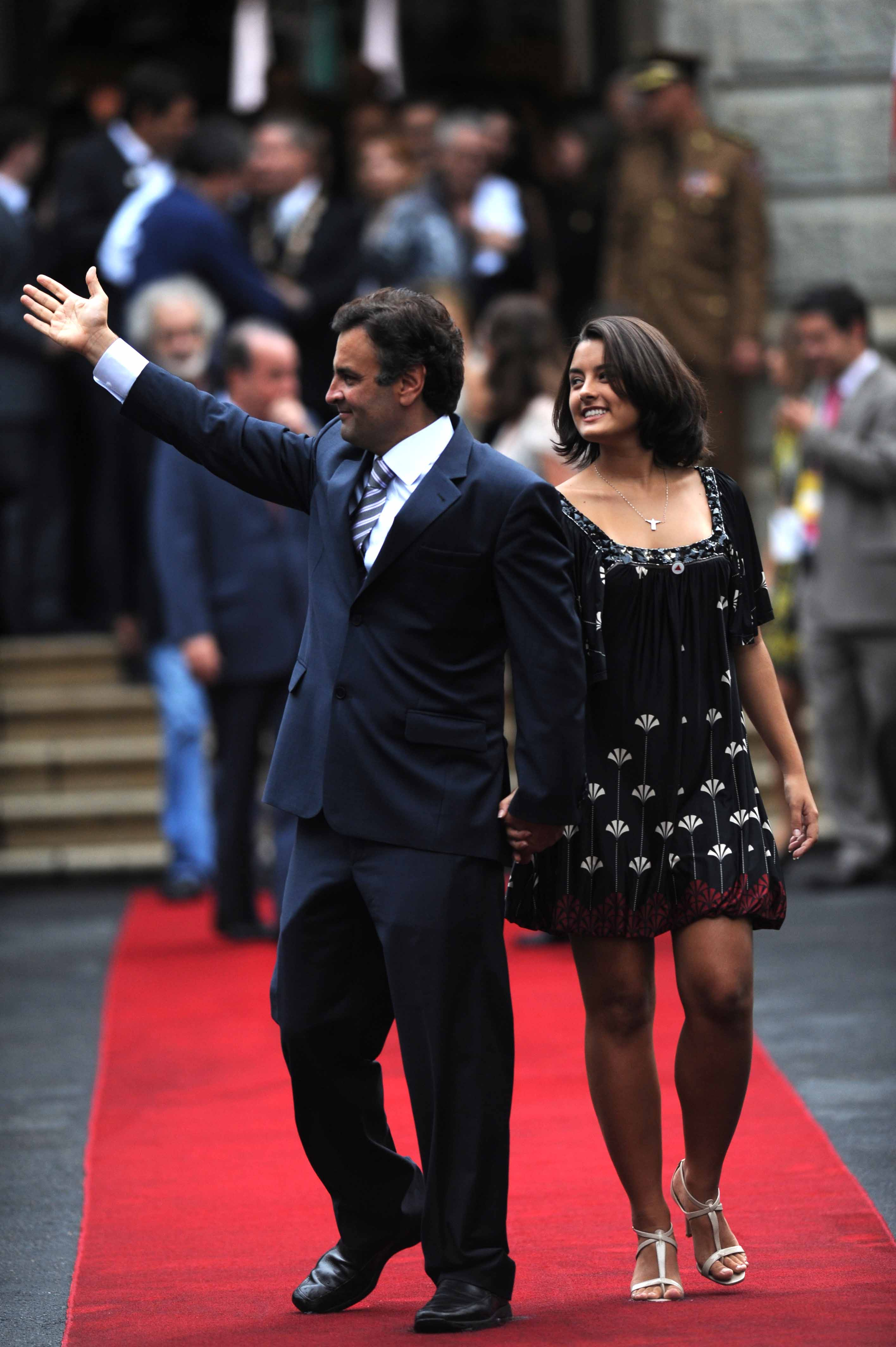
Neves and his daughter Gabriela in March 2010.

In December 2012, former Brazilian president Fernando Henrique Cardoso appointed Aécio Neves as candidate of the Brazilian Social Democracy Party for the 2014 presidential elections. In the October 2014 election, Neves received the second greatest number of votes in the first round, defeating former Environment Minister Marina Silva. He narrowly lost in the second round, a run-off against incumbent Dilma Rousseff on 26 October 2014, 48.4% to Rousseff's 51.6%.

== Controversies ==
=== Operation Car Wash ===
Neves was investigated in several corruption cases related to the "Car Wash" probe into kickbacks to politicians. Aécio Neves was quoted by four whistleblowers during investigations into Operation Car Wash. Alberto Youssef said he heard the former deputy José Janene tell Aécio's sister that he would give him the collection of funds from Furnas, a mixed economy company linked to the Ministry of Mines and Energy. The collection and distribution of bribes would have occurred between 1996 and 2000, during the government of Fernando Henrique Cardoso. On 25 August 2015, the CPI of Petrobras, Youssef reiterated that Aécio received money diverted from Furnas. A Supreme Court Judge, by the end of 2015, closed the case for insufficient information.

In July 2015, another witness, Carlos Alexandre de Souza Rocha, also known as Ceará, said he took R$300,000 to a director of UTC in Rio de Janeiro and the money would go to the senator. The director said that Aecio was "the most annoying" of his bribe collectord. In February 2016, the same Supreme Court Judge closed the case, again for insufficient information. However, due to lack of evidence, the prosecution decided not to proceed with the accusations.

On 3 February 2016, Fernando Moura, in a statement, said he heard reports of an alleged kickback from Furnas to Aécio Neves. Per Moura, who made a whistle-blowing agreement with the police, Dimas Toledo's appointment to the position of director of Furnas was made by Aécio in 2002. Moura was appointed by the "Speedy Wash" as a lobbyist. Dimas Toledo told him that "in Furnas was the same": "It'll be a third [of the bribery] to the government of São Paulo, one third of the national government and a third Aécio".

In March 2016, under a whistle-blowing agreement, Senator Delcídio Amaral made reference to supposed illegal activities of Aécio in the investigation conducted by the Legislature Branch (CPI) of Congress. Delcídio has information on deals made between him and Aécio during investigation of the Brazilian post office in 2006. In June 2016, the Supreme Federal Court authorised investigations related to alleged kickbacks from Furnas to proceed against Aécio Neves.

=== JBS case ===
In 2017 Aécio appeared again in other whistle-blowing agreements. Executives said JBS had paid Neves 80 million reais in illegal funding for that campaign as well as 2 million more recently to support a new "abuse of authority" law that seeks to make it easier for suspects and defendants to sue investigators, prosecutors and judges. Neves was recorded soliciting the 2 million reais ($638,000) from Joesley Batista, chairman of meatpacking company JBS SA. Batista told the authorities that Neves implied that the money would be used to pay for his defence in the Lava Jato (Carwash) investigations but the money never went to his lawyers. Instead, part of the money, received by the senator's cousin, ended up in a company owned by Zezé Perrella a cousin of Aécio who was also implicated in the biggest drug traffic scandal in Brazilian History.

In 2018, five justices of the Supreme Court unanimously decided to put Neves on trial for allegedly receiving from JBS 2 million reais ($590,000) in kickbacks.

=== Expired driver's license and refusal to take the breathalyzer test ===
In 2011, Neves was stopped by the police for having an expired driver's license and refused to take a breathalyzer test.

=== Drug addiction ===
Whenever he is asked, Neves replies that he "never used cocaine". His denial; however, is universally disputed in Brasil. For example, in 2008, fans shouted in the game Brazil against Argentina in the Mineirão stadium packed, comparing Neves to Diego Maradona, whose career was marked by dependence on cocaine: "Hey Maradona go f.... yourself, Aécio Neves sniffs more than you do!"

Neves, for several years, tried to disassociate his persona from the rumor of drug use and overcome a past reputation as a party-loving playboy with a penchant for luxury. Neves proposed a review of relations with supposed "narco state" Bolivia, as well as tighter control of the Brazil-Bolivia border. In 2009, requested by one of the most important political member of his party, Mr. Serra, an article was published on page 3 of the newspaper, O Estado de S. Paulo. The title of the article was: "“Pó, pará, governador?”" (Powder, stop, governor?) a play on words that was understood by many in the world of politics and among journalists as a clear allusion to the alleged use of the drug by the Senator.

During the 2014 campaign for president, had to face several news and situations opposing the remake "Drug-free-image"; for example, one of his key ally had 450 kilos of cocaine in his helicopter landing and arrested close to Neves' private family airport. The pilot was an employee of the house of deputies in the State of Minas Gerais, as a personal assistant to Gustavo Perrella, Neves' cousin. Despite the helicopter being the property of a private company, Perrella used his petrol allowances to fill the tanks of it. Despite it being the second biggest seizure of drugs in 2013, the mainstream media didn't show much interest in the story. Independent journalists in Brazil covered the incident on their newspapers and TV channels. Mr. Perrella was again involved in crime in 2017, when Joesely Batista said to have recorded senator Aecio Neves requesting two million reais in bribes. According to Globo, federal police filmed the payment to the senator's cousin. The money was then tracked to a bank account of a company that belongs to the Senator Zeze Perrella who's also related to the biggest drug traffic apprehension of Brazilian history.

Neves drug-image situation worsened when Lindsay Lohan got involved in Brazilian politics. She tweeted to 8.5 million followers: "'Brasil needs change and I support Aecio Neves!", which has since been deleted, as has the Facebook post. Due to her addiction problems, Lohan supporting her candidate was not that great of a marketing move to help Neves image.

In March 2016, the senator's drug-use-fame was revived when the body of Lucas Arcanjo was found dead à lá Herzog. Mr. Arcanjo was famously known by accusations of various crimes against the Senator, crimes such as drug trafficking, purchase of habeas corpus and murder.

== Personal life ==
Neves was born into a political family in the city of Belo Horizonte, capital of southeast Minas Gerais state, in 1960.

Neves married model Letícia Weber, from the state of Rio Grande do Sul, in 2013. They had twins, Bernardo and Julia, in September 2014. He has another daughter, Gabriela Falcão Neves, born in 1991 from his first marriage (1991–1998) with lawyer Andrea Falcão.

Andrea Neves, Aecio's sister, was arrested by the Federal Police in Brumadinho, in the Metropolitan Region of Belo Horizonte. Andrea Neves was arrested on suspicion that she had asked for money from businessman, Joesley Batista, on behalf of her brother. Frederico Pacheco de Medeiros, cousin of Senator Aécio Neves, was also arrested in Nova Lima because he was responsible for receiving the requested money from Joesley Batista.

== Elections ==
Year	Election	Party	Office	Coalition	Partners	Party	Votes	Percent	Result
1986	State Elections of Minas Gerais	PMDB	Federal Deputy	—N/a			236,019	—N/a	Elected
1990	State Elections of Minas Gerais	PSDB	Federal Deputy	—N/a			42,412	—N/a	Elected
1994	State Elections of Minas Gerais	PSDB	Federal Deputy	—N/a			105,385	2.17%	Elected
1998	State Elections of Minas Gerais	PSDB	Federal Deputy	—N/a			185,051	2.57%	Elected
2002	State Elections of Minas Gerais	PSDB	Governor	United Minas (PSDB, PFL, PPB, PV, PSL, PTN, PAN, PRTB, PHS)	Clésio Andrade	PFL	5,282,043	57.68%	Elected
2006	State Elections of Minas Gerais	PSDB	Governor	Minas Cannot Stop (PSDB, PFL, PP, PL, PSB, PTB, PPS, PSC, PAN, PHS)	Antonio Anastasia	PSDB	7,482,809	77.03%	Elected
2010	State Elections of Minas Gerais	PSDB	Senator	We Are Minas Gerais (PSDB, PP, DEM, PR, PSB, PDT, PTB, PPS, PSC, PMN, PSDC, PSL)	Elmiro Santiago	DEM	7,565,377	39.47%	Elected
2010	State Elections of Minas Gerais	PSDB	Senator	We Are Minas Gerais (PSDB, PP, DEM, PR, PSB, PDT, PTB, PPS, PSC, PMN, PSDC, PSL)	Tilden Santiago	PSB	7,565,377	39.47%	Elected
2014	Presidential election	PSDB	President	Change Brazil (PSDB, SD, PMN, PEN, PTN, PTC, DEM, PTdoB, PTB)	Aloysio Nunes	PSDB	34,897,211	33.55%	Runoff
2014	Presidential election	PSDB	President	Change Brazil (PSDB, SD, PMN, PEN, PTN, PTC, DEM, PTdoB, PTB)	Aloysio Nunes	PSDB	51,041,155	48.36%	Not elected
2018	State Elections of Minas Gerais	PSDB	Federal Deputy	Reconstruction Now (PSDB, PSD, Solidariedade, PPS, DEM, PP)	—N/a		106,702	1.08%	Elected
2022	State Elections of Minas Gerais	PSDB	Federal Deputy	—N/a			85,341	0.76%	Elected

== See also ==
- List of scandals in Brazil

Political offices
Preceded by Michel Temer	President of the Chamber of Deputies; 2001–2002	Succeeded by João Paulo Cunha
Preceded by Itamar Franco	Governor of Minas Gerais; 2003–2010	Succeeded by Antônio Anastasia
Party political offices
Preceded by Sérgio Guerra	President of the Brazilian Social Democracy Party; 2013–2017	Succeeded by Tasso Jereissati (acting)
Preceded by Marconi Perillo	President of the Brazilian Social Democracy Party; 2025–present	Incumbent
Preceded by José Serra	PSDB nominee for President of Brazil; 2014	Succeeded by Geraldo Alckmin
