= Aécio Ferreira da Cunha =

Brazilian politician

Aécio Ferreira da Cunha (4 January 1927 in Teófilo Otoni – 3 October 2010 in Belo Horizonte) was a Brazilian politician.

Son of politician Tristão Ferreira da Cunha, he married Inês Maria de Faria, daughter of President Tancredo Neves, they had a son, Aécio Neves, was member of Neves da Cunha oligarchy.
