= Sophia Mendonça =

Brazilian author

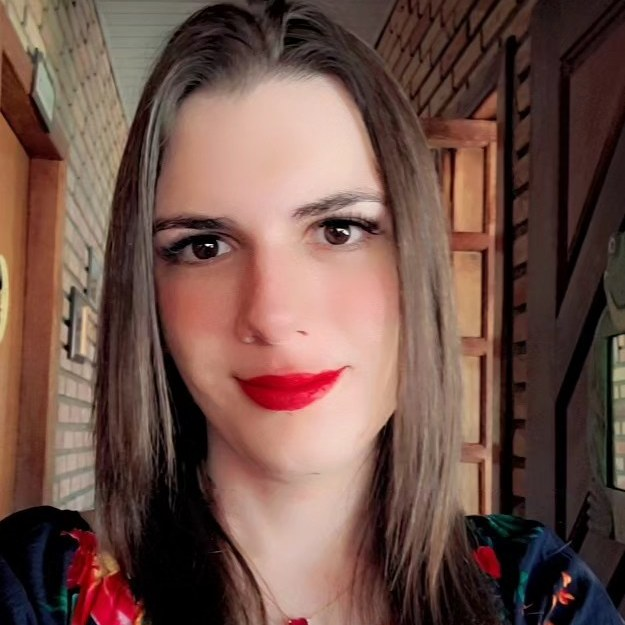
- Born: 2 June 1997 (age 29); Belo Horizonte, Brasil
- Occupation: Author
- Writing career
- Period: 2015–present
- Genres: Novel, Journalism

Sophia Silva de Mendonça is a Brazilian author who focuses on the experience of being autistic and trans and how that affects communication and sociality between individuals and groups.

== Career ==
Mendonça was diagnosed with asperger syndrome at the age of 11, which led her to having an interest in the process of socialization and how people communicate with each other. During her years in university studying for a degree in communication, she wrote a blog named Tudo Bem Ser Different (It's Okay To Be Different) and was the host on the University Center of Belo Horizonte weekly radio program Mundo Asperger. She also in her first year wrote her first book over the course of six months titled Outro Olhar – Reflexões de Um Autista (Another Look – Reflections of an Autistic).

She went on to receive a master's degree in communication, territorialities and vulnerabilities from the Federal University of Minas Gerais. Her works revolve around autism and neurodiversity, affective and loving accessibility, gender issues, virtual ethnography, communication through digital media and life narratives. She completed a postdoctoral communications degree in March 2022, with her thesis being titled "A interseccionalidade entre autismo e transgeneridade: diálogos afetivos no Twitter" ("The intersectionality between autism and transgenderity: affective dialogues on Twitter").

She continued to conduct journalism work in similar topic areas, founding alongside her mother first the YouTube channel O Mundo Autista and then other social media, before creating the newsgroup of the same name in partnership with the news portal UAI.

== Awards ==
In 2016, she received the Grande Colar from the Mérito Legislativo government of Belo Horizonte. In 2019, Mendonça received the Boas Práticas (Good Practices) award from Erasmus+, the European Union program for the fields of Education, Training, Youth and Sport for the period 2014 to 2020, with the aim of supporting the implementation of the Agenda European policy for social justice, inclusion, growth and employment.

== Personal life ==
She only found out she was autistic at the age of 13, two years after she was diagnosed. In 2021 in an interview with the university newspaper for the Pontifical Catholic University of Minas Gerais, Mendonça said that this diagnosis was liberating, but that the biggest "ghost" that accompanied her in life was not autism, but gender dysphoria, which is why she began to feel happier after her gender transition in 2020, since she sees gender expression as a way to communicate primarily with herself. She had gender reassignment surgery in June 2022. Since 2015, she has been a member of Soka Gakkai International, a Buddhist organization

== Bibliography ==
- — (November 19, 2015). Outro Olhar: Reflexões de um Autista [Another Look: Reflections of an Autistic] (in Portuguese). Manduruvá Edição Especiais. p. 68. ISBN 9788591993406.
- — (September 29, 2016). Danielle, Asperger (in Portuguese). Manduruvá Edição Especiais. p. 72. ISBN 9788591993413.
- —; Silva, Selma Sueli (September 17, 2018). Dez Anos Depois: Crônicas, Poemas, Artigos e Contos [Ten years later: Chronicles, Poems, Articles and Stories] (in Portuguese). Manduruvá Edição Especiais. p. 97. ISBN 9788591993475.
- — (March 22, 2019). Neurodivergentes: Autismo na Contemporaneidade [Neurodivergents: Autism in Contemporary Times] (in Portuguese). Manduruvá Edição Especiais. p. 100. ISBN 9788590681434.
- — (August 24, 2019). Entre Fadas e Bruxos [Between Fairies and Wizards] (in Portuguese). RM Books. p. 14. ISBN 9788590681472.
- — (February 6, 2020). Ikeda: Um Século de Humanismo [Ikeda: A Century of Humanism] (in Portuguese). RM Books. p. 120. ISBN 9786590182739.
- —; Romano, Raquel (December 4, 2020). Expressão Criadora [Creative Expression] (in Portuguese). Mundo Asperger. p. 50. ISBN 9786599271601.
- —; Silva, Selma Sueli (March 8, 2022). Autismo no Feminino: A voz da mulher autista [Autism in Females: The voice of the autistic woman] (in Portuguese). Asperger's World. p. 322. ISBN 9786599271618.
- —; Silva, Selma Sueli (March 23, 2023). Diversos diálogos: Autismo(s), meios e mediações [Various dialogues: Autism(s), means and mediations] (in Portuguese). Federal University of Minas Gerais. p. 90. ISBN 9786586963489.
- — (May 10, 2023). Metamorfoses - Autismo e diversidade de gênero [Metamorphoses - Autism and gender diversity] (in Portuguese). Páginas Editora. p. 158. ISBN 9786550792404.

== Filmography ==
| Year | Title | Notes | Ref. |
|---|---|---|---|
| 2015-2017 | Mundo Asperger | Host | |
| 2015-present | Mundo Autista | Host | |
| 2019 | Para Sempre Arte | Host | |
| 2019-2021 | Introvertendo | Recurring role | |
| 2020 | Brasil das Gerais | Guest | |
| 2020 | De Brincadeira | Host | |
| 2021 | AutWork | Director | |
| 2022 | Amores (a)Típicos | Host | |
| 2022 | Vozes da Maturidade | Host | |
| 2022 | Espectros | Guest | |
| 2022 | Dazumana: Ciência Sem Jaleco | Guest | |
| 2022 | TransParente | Host | |
| 2022-present | Mundo Autista D&I | Host | |
| 2023 | Desvendando Mitos e Verdades sobre o Autismo | Host | |
| 2023 | Gêmeas Trans: Uma Nova Vida | Recurring role | |
