= Tilden Santiago =

Brazilian politician (1940–2022)

Member of the Chamber of Deputies
- In office 1 February 1991 – 31 January 2003

Ambassador of Brazil to Cuba
- In office 25 April 2003 – 23 January 2007

Personal details
- Born: 13 July 1940 Nova Era, Minas Gerais, Brazil
- Died: 2 February 2022 (aged 81) Belo Horizonte, Minas Gerais, Brazil
- Party: PT (1980-2007); PSB (2008-2019); PSOL (2020-2021); Cidadania (2021-2022)

Tilden José Santiago (13 July 1940 – 2 February 2022) was a Brazilian politician and diplomat. He served as a federal deputy for Minas Gerais from 1991 to 2023 and ambassador to Cuba from 2003 to 2007. He was also special advisor to the presidency of CEMIG.

== Political career ==
Graduating in Philosophy and Journalism, Santiago joined the Ação Libertadora Nacional (ALN) after the 1964 military coup, and became one of the founders of the Central Única dos Trabalhadores (CUT) and the Workers' Party (PT). He was ordained a priest in 1967, abandoning the priesthood in the 1970s.

Santiago worked in the government of Itamar Franco as secretary of the Environment and Sustainable Development. He was a federal deputy for three consecutive terms.

In 2002, Santiago came third in the election for Senator in Minas Gerais, an election in which the two most voted were elected. He received 3,301,171 votes, equivalent to 20.57% of the total. For assuming a position at the state-owned company CEMIG during the state government Aécio Neves in 2007, his membership in the Workers' Party was suspended. In the second half of 2008, Santiago joined the Brazilian Socialist Party (PSB).

Santiago was the Brazilian ambassador to Cuba during President Lula's first term (2003–2006). His position as ambassador generated some controversy.

In July 2010, Santiago was announced as the second alternate on Aécio Neves' Senate ticket. The first alternate was Elmiro Nascimento, from the DEM, while the other seat for the Senate race went to former president of the Republic Itamar Franco, a member of the PPS, who died in 2011.

In 2012, Santiago was threatened with expulsion from the PSB for denouncing the party for fraud in the election in Contagem, in which the party supported Durval Ângelo (PT), while Santiago declared support for Carlin Moura (PCdoB).

== Death ==
Santiago died of COVID-19 on 2 February 2022, at the age of 81.
