= Tristão Ferreira da Cunha =

Brazilian politician, lawyer and scholar

Personal details
- Born: 27 July 1890 Teófilo Otoni, Brazil
- Died: 2 January 1974 (aged 83) Rio de Janeiro, Brazil

Tristão Ferreira da Cunha (Teófilo Otoni, 27 July 1890 – Rio de Janeiro, 2 January 1974) was a Brazilian politician, lawyer and scholar.

In 1934, he was elected constituent state deputy for the Partido Republicano Mineiro, but his term was interrupted by the establishment of the Estado Novo regime.

He was father of Aécio Ferreira da Cunha and grandfather of Aécio Neves.
