= Paulo Kogos =

Brazilian activist

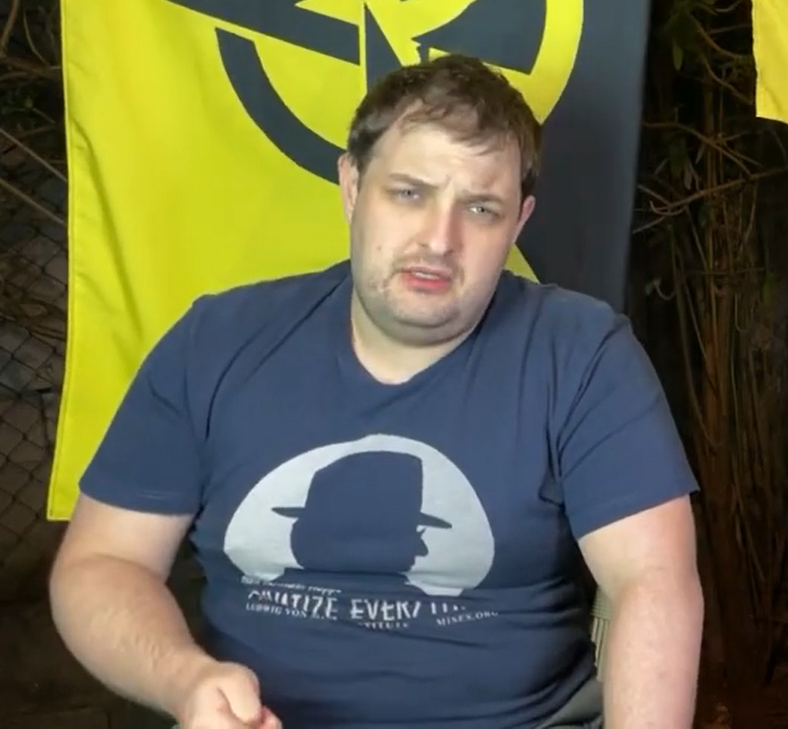
- Kogos in 2021
- Born: Paulo Hugenneyer Kogos; May 20, 1986 (age 40); São Paulo, Brazil
- Education: Insper
- Occupation: YouTuber

YouTube information
- Channel: Ocidente em Fúria
- Genres: Political criticism; Far-right politics
- Subscribers: 193 thousand
- Views: 6.3 million
- Last updated: April 16, 2026

Paulo Hugenneyer Kogos (born May 20, 1986) is a Brazilian political activist, YouTuber and digital influencer who is a self-proclaimed far-right activist. Kogos is notable for participating in demonstrations against social isolation during the COVID-19 pandemic. He defines himself as a sedevacantist catholic and a conservative. A right-libertarian and admirer of the Austrian School of Economics, he also used to identify as an anarcho-capitalist, but abandoned that label around 2023 in favor of a "ontolibertarian" identity.

== Personal life ==
Paulo Kogos is the son of gynaecologist Waldemar Kogos and dermatologist Ligia Kogos. The latter is known as the "Queen of Botox" and has among her clients Marcela Temer, Beth Szafir, and Amaury Jr.

Kogos states that he has Asperger syndrome, although he has not received a diagnosis.

=== Military service and education ===
Kogos claims that he studied at the Reserve Officers' Training Centre (CPOR) in 2005, graduating to reserve officer aspirant in the communications branch of the Brazilian Army.

He holds a degree in Business Administration from Insper – where he was editor-in-chief of Insper Post, the university's journal – and a supposed postgraduate degree in Economics from Mackenzie University. In April 2020, Kogos was reportedly in his second year of undergraduate studies in philosophy at the São Bento Monastery, São Paulo.

== Political activism ==
=== Views ===
Paulo Kogos became known for his controversial political statements on his YouTube channel Ocidente em Fúria. He advocates, among other points, separatism, the return of the Inquisition and the Crusades, and the defense of the Catholic Church against "moral devastation." He supports Jair Bolsonaro and has stated that he was "brave" for denouncing Christophobia at the 75th session of the UN General Assembly.

In an interview with Pânico, by Jovem Pan, Kogos declared himself an "extreme of the extreme right." Also, Kogos said that he had always leaned towards the political right, even appreciating the Brazilian military dictatorship, and that he had embraced anarcho-capitalism after studying the Austrian school of economics.

In an interview with O Estado de S. Paulo, Kogos identified himself as an "anarcho-capitalist with monarchical tendencies" and said that he sees in a democracy the "loss of moral restraints and ethical limits." He defends a Christian society with free markets, order, and hierarchy based on the principle of social inequality, where some people are better suited to serve. Authority would be exercised by "small governments formed by a natural elite."

=== COVID-19 pandemic ===
Some journalists accuse Paulo Kogos of being a COVID-19 denialist. He has described COVID as "a virus slightly worse than a little flu" and stated that the World Health Organisation "should be militarily wiped out by armed commandos." He has used his YouTube channel to discredit COVID vaccination.

Even though João Doria, the then-governor of São Paulo, is his family's friend, Kogos began to declare himself a fierce opponent of Doria and the social isolation measures he had decreed, promoting a campaign of opposition. On April 12, 2020, he took part in a demonstration on Paulista Avenue carrying a fake coffin. Following the incident, he was criticized on social media for disrespecting the victims of COVID-19. In his defense, Kogos stated that the coffin represented the burial of Doria's political career, Nazism, communism, and what he called "PSDBism." A few days later, he posted a video apologizing to the governor.

In the same month of April, Kogos had his Twitter account deleted for posting inappropriate content.

=== 2022 São Paulo legislative election ===
In April 2020, Kogos said that he was firmly opposed to party politics, denying any interest in running for elections, but in 2022, he joined the Brazilian Labor Party (PTB) to run for a seat in the Legislative Assembly of São Paulo. He received 33,109 votes, placing first in his party, but failed to be elected since the PTB did not reach the electoral quota.

== Social media activity ==
A study by the Faculty of Social and Human Sciences of NOVA University Lisbon identified Paulo Kogos' YouTube channel as one of the dominant voices in the ecosystem of Brazilian right-populist movements on that platform. The ForceAtlas2 algorithm and the Modularity and Weighted Average Degree metrics allowed the detection of an entire community centered on his channel. It is inserted in the network dominated by Movimento Brasil Livre and the other dominated by anarcho-capitalist channel Ideias Radicais, acting as a bridge between both groups' communities.

== Literary references ==
Paulo Kogos appears in the libertarian children's book Anya e o Mistério do Sumiço do Cãozinho Galt in the role of Kogros the Terrible, "a boy who thought he was an ogre."
