= Clésio Andrade =

Brazilian politician and businessman

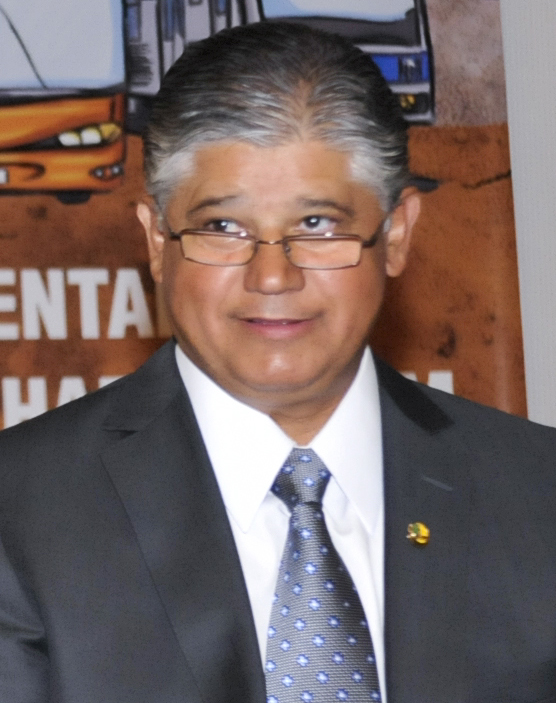

Senator from Minas Gerais
- In office February 1, 2011 – July 15, 2014

Vice-Governor of Minas Gerais
- In office January 1, 2003 – December 31, 2006

Personal details
- Born: October 12, 1952 (age 74) Juatuba, Minas Gerais
- Party: Brazilian Democratic Movement Party
- Profession: Businessman

Clésio Soares de Andrade (born October 12, 1952) is a Brazilian politician and businessman. He represented Minas Gerais in the Federal Senate from 2011 to 2014. Previously, he was Vice-Governor of Minas Gerais from 2003 to 2006. He is a member of the Brazilian Democratic Movement Party.

As president of the National Confederation of Transport (CNT) he has defended tax cuts for public transport corporations.
