= Selma Sueli Silva =

Brazilian journalist

Selma Sueli Silva (September 17, 1963) is a Brazilian journalist, writer and radio personality.

== Career ==
Silva worked as a producer and presenter on several radio stations in Minas Gerais, where it is estimated that she reached a large audience. In an earlier period of her career, she also worked as a chief advisor at INSS/MG. She also works as a podcaster, addressing themes as autism in elderly people and motherhood on autism. In 2025, she began her master's degree in Literature at Federal University of Pelotas.

Selma Sueli Silva is recognized for being one of the creators of the portal "O Mundo Autista", launched in 2015, which has become a relevant digital platform with content created by people within the autistic spectrum in Brazil.

Her work in literature includes an autobiography, Minha vida de Trás para Frente (2017), the journalistic book Camaleônicos (2019) and Autismo no Feminino (2022). On fiction, she wrote the psychologic horror about motherhood Nem Tudo é o que Parece (2024).

== Awards ==
In 2023, the Mundo Autista channel, hosted by Silva and Sophia Mendonça, won the Digital Microinfluencers Award, in the people with disabilities category, during the fifth edition of the award, by popular and technical votes.

== Personal life ==
In 2016, Selma Sueli Silva was diagnosed with Autism Spectrum Disorder (ASD). This personal experience motivated her to share her experiences and reflections on autism through writing and digital platforms.

== Books ==
- Minha vida de trás para Frente (2017)
- Dez anos Depois (2018)
- Camaleõnicos (2019)
- Autismo no Feminino (2022)
- Diversos Diálogos (2022)
- Nem Tudo é o que Parece (2024)
