= Lucas Gomes Arcanjo =

Brazilian police officer

- Born: April 30, 1971; Belo Horizonte, Brazil
- Died: March 26, 2016 (aged 44); Belo Horizonte, Brazil
- Cause of death: Found dead at home with tie around neck
- Occupation: police officer
- Employer: Traffic Department of Minas Gerais State
- Known for: Accusations against Aécio Neves

Lucas Gomes Arcanjo (April 30, 1971 – March 26, 2016) was a police officer who served as civil police for the State Traffic Department of Minas Gerais and was also a candidate for a seat in the Chamber of Deputies for the Brazilian Labour Renewal Party. Arcanjo was famously known in online social networks by several accusations against the senator, Aécio Neves (PSDB). In many different YouTube videos, the police officer accused the politician of involvement with various crimes, such as drug trafficking, purchase of habeas corpus and murder. In one of the video recordings, he said that a body was found on Neves' cousin's property in Cláudio municipality with indications of a coup de grâce execution. Arcanjo gained support from well-known actress Tássia Camargo, who reinforced the accusations of the police officer against the senator. The officer was the victim of four attempts on his life as an answer to the complaints made. On March 26, 2016, he was found dead in his home with a tie around his neck tied to his bedroom window. Family members rule out the possibility of suicide.
