= Elias Jabbour =

Brazilian geographer, academic, and Marxist intellectual

- Jabbour in 2025

Member-elect of the Chamber of Deputies
- Assuming office 1 February 2027
- Constituency: Rio de Janeiro

Personal details
- Born: Elias Marco Khalil Jabbour; 12 December 1975 (age 50) São Paulo, Brazil
- Party: PCdoB (1991–present)
- Education: University of São Paulo
- Occupation: Geographer, university professor, writer
- Scientific career
- Fields: Geopolitics
- Thesis: Projeto nacional, desenvolvimento e socialismo de mercado na China de hoje (2010)
- Doctoral advisor: Armen Mamigonian

Elias Marco Khalil Jabbour (born 1975) is a Brazilian geographer, university professor, Marxist intellectual, and writer, known for his studies on the economic development of China and for his theoretical contribution to the formulation of the concept of the New Project Economy (Note: Translator's note: The Portuguese term projetamento has no established or standardized equivalent in English, since it's not even common in Portuguese. In the existing English-language literature by the author, different renderings have been used, including "New Design Economy" and "New Projectment Economy," reflecting exploratory translation choices rather than a settled terminology. In this article, "New Project Economy" is adopted as a conceptual translation, intended to convey the central idea of an economy structured around state-led projects and planning, without introducing a non-standard or morphologically anomalous neologism in English.) (Nova Economia do Projetamento, in Portuguese). He serves as president of the Pereira Passos Municipal Institute of Urbanism (IPP), as a professor at the Faculty of Economic Sciences of the Rio de Janeiro State University (UERJ), and holds a PhD in Human Geography from the University of São Paulo (USP).

== Education and career ==
=== Academic background ===
Jabbour earned his undergraduate degree in Geography from USP in 1997 and later completed a master's degree (2005) and a doctorate (2010) in human geography at the same institution. His doctoral dissertation, entitled National project, development and market socialism in China today, analyzed the relationship between national projects, development, and the socialist market model in contemporary China.

In 2014, Jabbour became an associate professor at the Faculty of Economic Sciences of UERJ and has since taught in the Graduate Programs in Economic Sciences (PPGCE) and International Relations (PPGRI). His research focuses on the role of the state, innovation, and long-term planning in contemporary socialist experiences, particularly the Chinese case.

=== Professional activity ===
Between April 2006 and February 2007, Jabbour served as an economic advisor to the Presidency of the Chamber of Deputies.

In 2022, Jabbour was invited by former Brazilian president Dilma Rousseff, then president of the New Development Bank (NDB, also known as the BRICS Bank), to assume the position of Director of Research at the institution, headquartered in Shanghai, China. He took a leave of absence from his academic duties at UERJ to occupy the post, with an expected tenure of two years. Acting between 2023 and 2024 as Senior Consultant to the NDB Presidency, Jabbour made analytical contributions on China's role in the development of strategic technologies such as artificial intelligence and their geopolitical implications.

In December 2024, he was invited by Rio de Janeiro mayor Eduardo Paes to serve as president of the Pereira Passos Municipal Institute of Urbanism (IPP), as reported by columnist Mônica Bergamo in Folha de S.Paulo.

== Political activity ==
Jabbour is affiliated with the Communist Party of Brazil (PCdoB) and is active as a theoretical contributor and intellectual militant.

=== Debates and interviews ===
From 2024 onward, Jabbour began appearing regularly in debates and interviews on podcasts and YouTube channels. His participation in a widely viewed debate with Elias Jabbour and Pablo Marçal on the Inteligência Ilimitada podcast, where they discussed topics such as public security, economics, communism, democracy, religion, and science in Brazil. The debate drew online attention, with Jabbour broadly perceived as more substantiated in economic arguments, while Marçal faced criticism for relying on motivational rhetoric. Key moments included Jabbour's defense of science and public policy, his rebuttal of claims about communism and religious freedom, and his critique of Brazil's tax system and inequality.

== Theoretical contributions ==
Jabbour is one of the formulators of the theory of the New Project Economy, developed in partnership with economist Alberto Gabriele. The concept describes a hybrid form of planning and market coordination characterized by technological innovation, state guidance, and coordination between public and private enterprises. The theory was detailed in the article Initial considerations on the "New Design Economy", published in the journal Geosul.

== Recognition ==
Jabbour has been awarded honorary citizenship by the cities of Niterói (in 2023), Belém (in 2025), and Rio de Janeiro (in 2025).

In 2022, Jabbour received the Special Book Award of China for his contribution to international understanding of the Chinese development model, particularly for the book China: o socialismo do século XXI.

== Selected works ==
- Jabbour, Elias (2006). China: Desenvolvimento e Socialismo de Mercado (in Brazilian Portuguese) (2 ed.). Florianópolis: LABEUR, GCN, CFH, UFSC. ISBN 978-6500417784.
- Jabbour, Elias (2010). China hoje: Projeto nacional, desenvolvimento e socialismo de mercado (in Brazilian Portuguese). Anita Garibaldi. ISBN 978-85-7277-106-1.
- Jabbour, Elias (2020). China: Socialismo e Desenvolvimento – sete décadas depois (in Brazilian Portuguese). Anita Garibaldi. ISBN 978-65-990905-5-4.
- Jabbour, Elias; Gabriele, Alberto (2021). China: O socialismo do século XXI (in Brazilian Portuguese). São Paulo: Boitempo. ISBN 978-65-5717-109-7.
- Gabriele, Alberto; Jabbour, Elias (2022). Socialist economic development in the 21st century: a century after the bolshevik revolution. London; New York: Routledge. ISBN 978-1-032-21222-7.

== See also ==
- Market socialism
- Marxism–Leninism
- Economy of China
- Anti-imperialism
- Anti-communism
- Criticism of neoliberalism
