= Juatuba =

Municipality in Minas Gerais, Brazil

Coordinates: 19°57′07″S 44°20′34″W

- Municipality
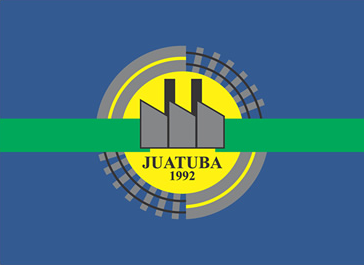
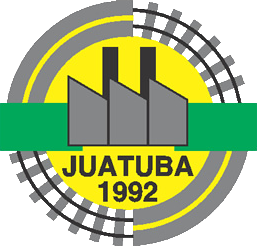
- Flag Coat of arms
- Interactive map of Juatuba
- Country: Brazil
- State: Minas Gerais
- Region: Southeast

Population (2022 Census)
  - Total: 30,716
  - Estimate (2025): 33,249
- Time zone: UTC−3 (BRT)

Location of Juatuba within Minas Gerais

Juatuba is a Brazilian municipality located in the state of Minas Gerais. The city belongs to the mesoregion Metropolitana de Belo Horizonte and to the microregion of Belo Horizonte. In 2025 the estimated population was 33,249.

== See also ==
- List of municipalities in Minas Gerais
