= Lucas Gomes (footballer, born 1995) =

Brazilian footballer

Personal information
- Full name: Lucas Augusto Silva Gomes
- Date of birth: 16 June 1995 (age 31)
- Place of birth: Londrina, Brazil
- Height: 1.78 m (5 ft 10 in)
- Position: Forward

Youth career
- 2012: Ranchariense
- 2013: União São João
- 2013: CA Votuporanguense

Senior career*
Years	Team	Apps	(Gls)
2017	Presidente Prudente		
2018	FK Egnatia	6	(0)
2018	Colorado AC	0	(0)
- * Club domestic league appearances and goals as of 14:44, 20 July 2018 (UTC)

Lucas Augusto Silva Gomes (born 16 June 1995) is a Brazilian footballer who plays as a forward.

== Career statistics ==
=== Club ===
As of 20 July 2018.

Club	Season	League			Cup		Other		Total	
Club	Season	Division	Apps	Goals	Apps	Goals	Apps	Goals	Apps	Goals
FK Egnatia	2017–18	Albanian First Division	6	0	0	0	0	0	6	0
Colorado AC	2018	–			0	0	1 (Note: Appearances in the Campeonato Paranaense A3)	0	1	0
Career total			6	0	0	0	1	0	7	0
