= Márcia Wayna Kambeba =

Brazilian poet

- Born: Márcia Vieira da Silva; 1979 (age 46–47); Tabatinga, Amazonas, Brazil
- Education: Amazonas State University; Federal University of Amazonas
- Occupations: Writer, poet, geographer
- Political party: PSOL
- Spouse: José Carlos
- Children: 1

Márcia Vieira da Silva, better known as Márcia Wayna Kambeba (born 1979), is a Brazilian poet and geographer.

== Biography ==
Of Omágua and Kambeba background, Kambeba was born in a Ticuna village (or aldeia) in the locality of Belém do Solimões, which is currently in the town of Tabatinga (formerly Benjamin Constant). She lived there until she was 8 years old, when she moved with her family to São Paulo de Olivença. Her grandmother, Assunta, was a teacher at the aldeia where she was born, and who introduced her to poetry, an interest that would be reinforced by the state of the first school she attended, in São Paulo de Olivença, and by one of her other major influences, "Tia Sueli". She graduated with a degree in geography from Amazonas State University (UEA). She earned her master's degree from the Federal University of Amazonas and did research on the territory and identity of her ethnicity.

As a poet, she adopted the Indigenous name Wayna. Her poetry shows similarities with cordel literature and reflects the violence inflicted on the Indigenous peoples and the conflicts brought on by life in the city.

In 2020, she became a candidate for councilwoman in the city of Belém, the capital of the state of Pará, as a member of PSOL. She was not elected, but with the victory of fellow PSOL member and mayoral candidate Edmilson Rodrigues, she was named the following year as an ouvidor for the city, composing Rodrigues' secretariat. She became the first Indigenous person to be appointed to a first-ranking position in the city. While in the position, as the representation of the demands of the city's population, she had support from ten collaborators, half of them being Indigenous.

== Personal life ==
Kambeba is married to mechanic and office owner José Carlos, with whom they have a child, Carlos. Carlos is autistic and has drawn illustrations in her books. The two worked together in the book Kumiça Jenó: Narrativas Poéticas dos Seres da Floresta, released in 2021.

== Bibliography ==
- 2013 - Ay kakyri Tama - Eu moro na cidade - Grafisa ISBN 978-8598349633
- 2020 - Saberes da Floresta - Jandaíra ISBN 978-6587113104
- 2021 - Kumiça Jenó: Narrativas Poéticas dos Seres da Floresta ISBN 978-1949868333
