= Amom Mandel =

Brazilian politician (born 2001)

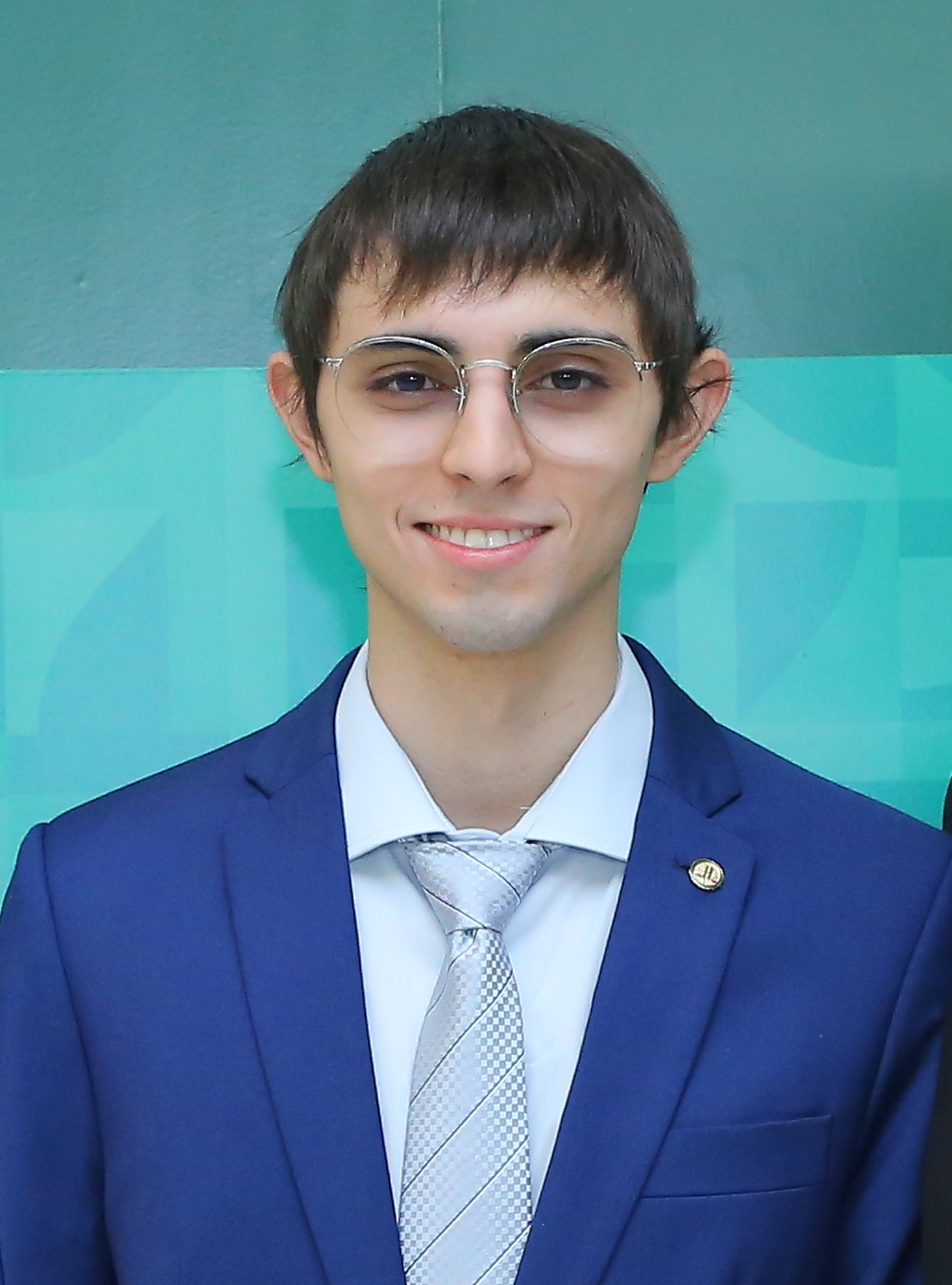
- Mandel in 2023

Member of the Chamber of Deputies
- Incumbent
- Assumed office 1 February 2023
- Constituency: Amazonas

Member of the Municipal Chamber of Manaus
- In office 1 January 2021 – 26 January 2023
- Constituency: At-large

Personal details
- Born: Amom Mandel Lins Filho; 2 January 2001 (age 25) Recife, Pernambuco, Brazil
- Party: Republicanos (2026–present)
- Other political affiliations: PODE (2020–2022); Cidadania (2022–2026)

Amom Mandel Lins Filho (born 2 January 2001) is a Brazilian politician serving as a member of the Chamber of Deputies since 2023. From 2021 to 2023, he served as city councillor of Manaus. He is the first known person with autism to become a federal deputy in Brazil.
