= Andréa Werner =

Brazilian journalist and politician (born 1975)

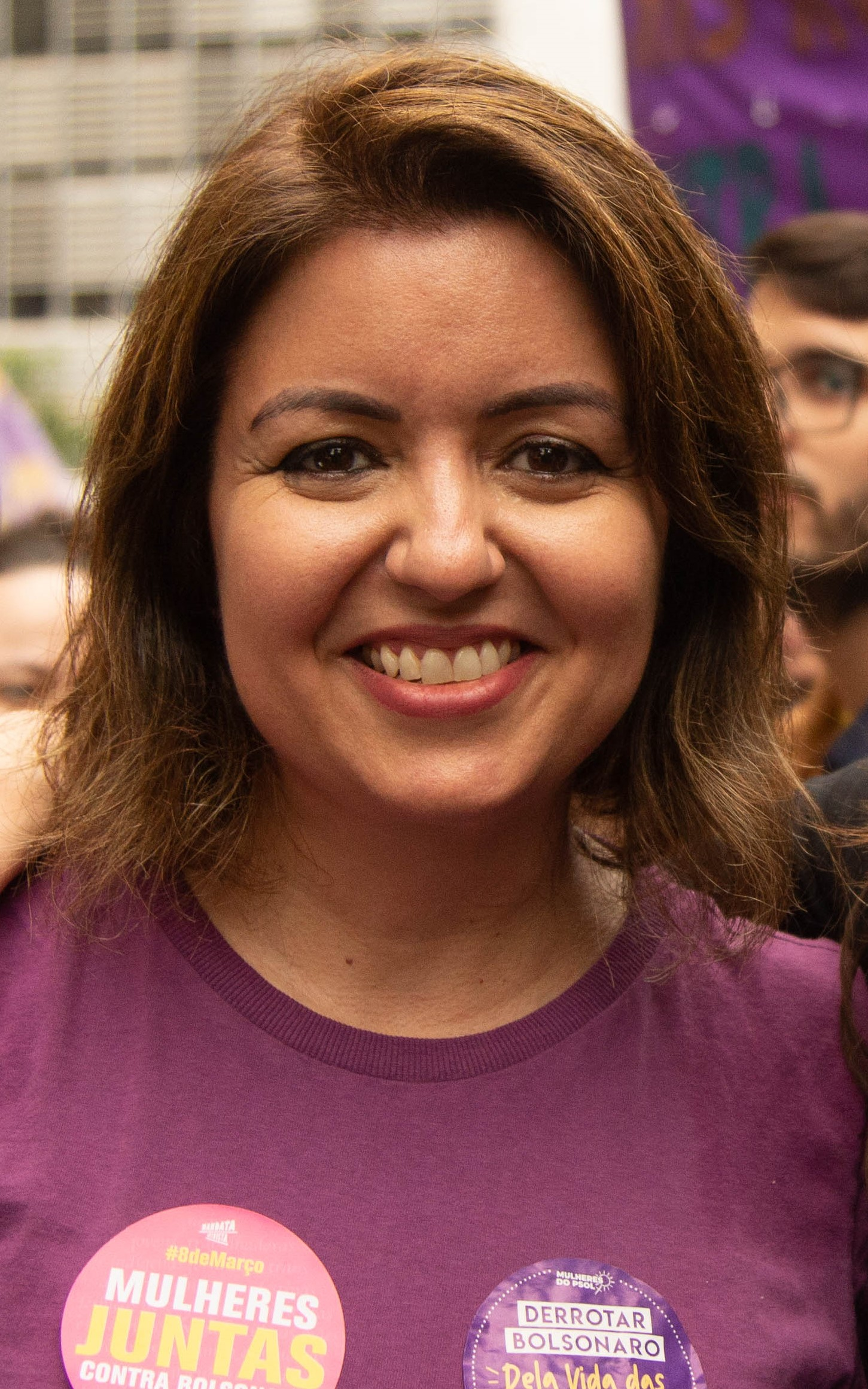
- Andréa Werner in March 2020.

Legislative Assembly of São Paulo
- Incumbent
- Assumed office 15 March 2023

Personal details
- Born: Andréa Werner Silva Bonoli; November 30, 1975 (age 50) Belo Horizonte, Minas Gerais, Brazil
- Citizenship: Brazilian
- Party: PSB (2021–present)
- Other political affiliations: PSOL (until 2021)
- Children: 1
- Education: Pontifical Catholic University of Minas Gerais
- Profession: Journalist
- Website: www.andreawerner.com.br

Andréa Werner Silva Bonoli (born November 30, 1975) is a Brazilian journalist, politician, and activist for the rights of people with autism, and a member of the Brazilian Socialist Party (PSB). She has been a state deputy for São Paulo since 2022.

== Early life and education ==
Born in Belo Horizonte, the capital of the state of Minas Gerais, Andréa earned a degree in journalism from Pontifical Catholic University of Minas Gerais (PUC-MG).

== Personal life and the relationship with autism ==
In 2010, after her son was diagnosed with autism, she began studying the condition and subsequently created the blog Lagarta Vira Pupa with the intention of sharing her experiences as the mother of a child with autism. The project gained prominence within the Brazilian autism community by addressing topics such as diagnosis, acceptance of autism, mental health, and policy. Andréa began speaking at autism events and on television programs, and in 2016, she published the book Lagarta Vira Pupa: A vida e os aprendizados ao lado de um lindo garotinho autista [Caterpillar becomes a pupa:Life and learnings beside a beautiful autistic boy]. In 2017, she published the children's book Meu amigo faz iiiii [My friend says 'iiii'].

Werner was also a columnist for Crescer magazine, part of the Grupo Globo. In January 2021, Andréa Werner announced the founding of an organization called Instituto Lagarta Vira Pupa, made up of mothers of children with disabilities and women with disabilities, including those on the autism spectrum.

As an adult, Andréa was diagnosed with attention deficit hyperactivity disorder (ADHD). In 2023, she underwent a new professional evaluation and publicly revealed that she had been diagnosed with autism.

== Political career ==
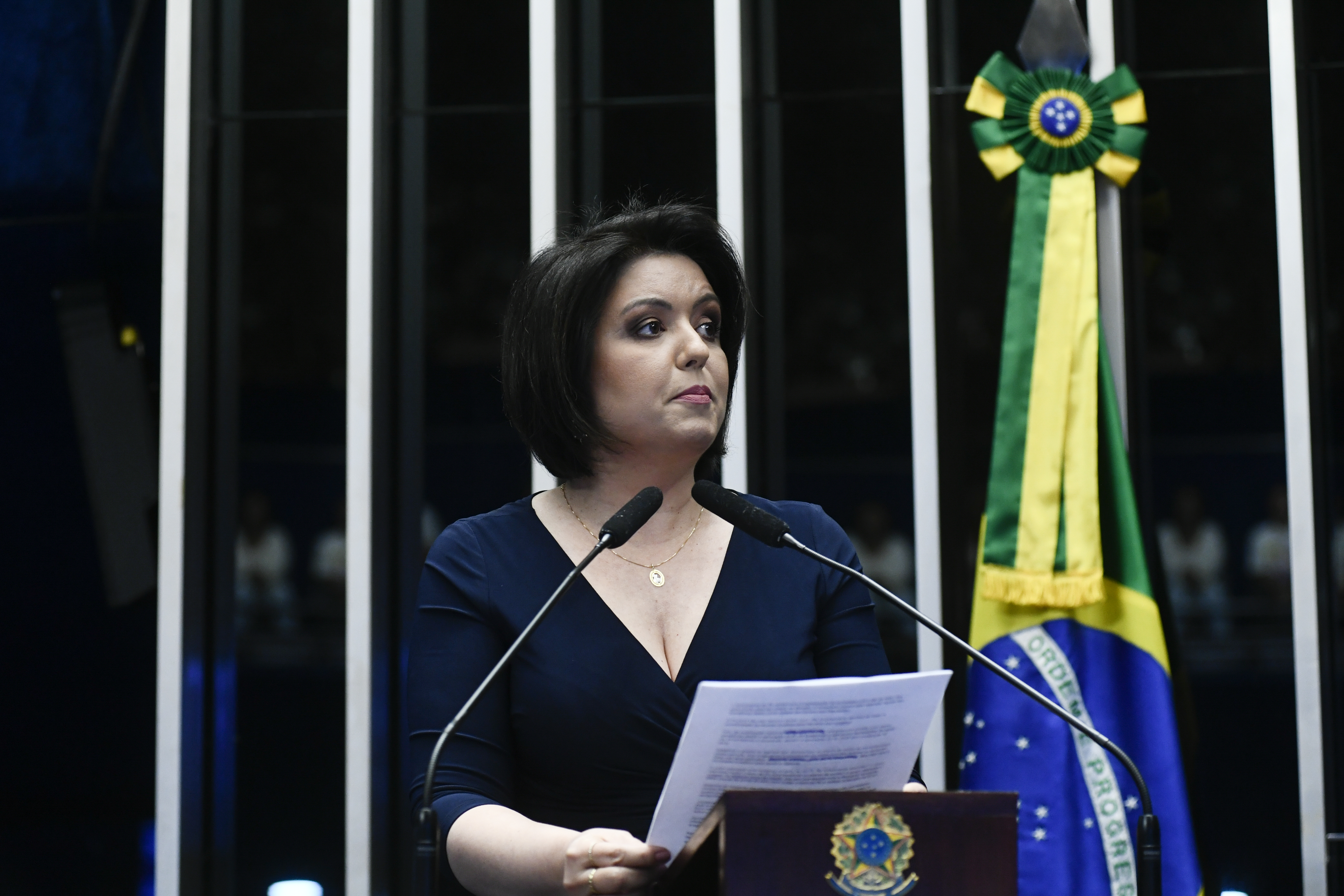
Andréa Werner in the Federal Senate in 2022.

Werner ran for federal deputy representing São Paulo for the Socialism and Liberty Party (PSOL) in the 2018 Brazilian elections, campaigning on an agenda focused on the rights of people with disabilities. She received 43,142 votes but was not elected.

In 2020, Andréa Werner ran for city councilor in São Paulo on the PSOL ticket. She received 17,565 votes and was again not elected.

In 2021, Werner announced that she was leaving the PSOL and joining the Brazilian Socialist Party (PSB), alongside Márcio França and Marcelo Freixo, to increase her chances of being elected to public office. She ran for state representative for São Paulo in the 2022 elections, and was elected with 88,820 votes. In 2026, she ran for federal deputy representing São Paulo. After receiving just over 45,000 votes, she was not elected to the office.

=== Electoral performance ===
Year	Position	Party	Votes	Result	Ref.
2018	Federal Representative for São Paulo	PSOL	43 142	Not elected	
2020	São Paulo City Councilmember	PSOL	17 565	Not elected	
2022	State deputy from São Paulo	PSB	88 820	Elected	
2026	Federal Representative for São Paulo	PSB	45 627	Not elected	

== Books ==
- Lagarta Vira Pupa: A vida e os aprendizados ao lado de um lindo garotinho autista. São Paulo: Vika Books, 2016.
- Meu amigo faz iiiii. São Paulo: Pingue Pongue, 2017.
