= Revista Autismo =

Brazilian magazine

- Editor-in-chief: Paiva Junior
- Categories: Health
- Frequency: Semiannual
- Circulation: 20.000 (2012) (Brazil)
- Publisher: ONG Consciencia Solidaria
- First issue: September 2010
- Country: Brazil
- Based in: Atibaia, SP, Brazil
- Language: Portuguese
- Website: RevistaAutismo.com.br

Revista Autismo ("Autism Magazine" in English) is a Brazilian magazine, free, pressed and digital, created in 2010, made by volunteering parents of children with autism. It is the first magazine about autism in Latin America and the first in the world on this syndrome.

In an unprecedented initiative, a group of parents of autistic children created the Revista Autismo. All this was done only thanks to volunteer work and donations. The magazine is free, being circulated throughout Brazil and the first copy was published in September 2010.

The founders are the journalist Paiva Junior (editor-in-chief) and the advertising Martim Fanucchi (art-editor), both fathers of autistic children. A lot of other parents collaborate with the magazine work, donations and sharing knowledge about ASD.

== See also ==
- Autism
