= Ivair Nogueira do Pinho =

Brazilian politician (1951–2021)

Member of the Legislative Assembly of Minas Gerais
- In office 1995 – 1 February 2011

Mayor of Betim
- In office 1991–1992

Deputy Mayor of Betim
- In office 1989–1990

Personal details
- Born: 6 November 1951; Betim, Fourth Brazilian Republic
- Died: 31 March 2021 (aged 69); Belo Horizonte, Brazil
- Political party: PMDB

Ivair Nogueiro do Pinho (6 November 1951 – 31 March 2021) was a Brazilian politician, civil engineer, and businessman.

== Biography ==
He first served as Deputy Mayor of Betim from 1989 to 1990 before becoming Mayor, serving from 1991 to 1992. He was then elected to the Legislative Assembly of Minas Gerais, where he served from 1995 to 2011, although he left his post from 1 January 1999 to 30 March 2000 to serve as Secretary of State for Sports in the cabinet of Itamar Franco.

Ivair Nogueiro do Pinho died of COVID-19 in Belo Horizonte on 31 March 2021 at the age of 69.
