= Fiat Uno =

Supermini manufactured and marketed by Fiat

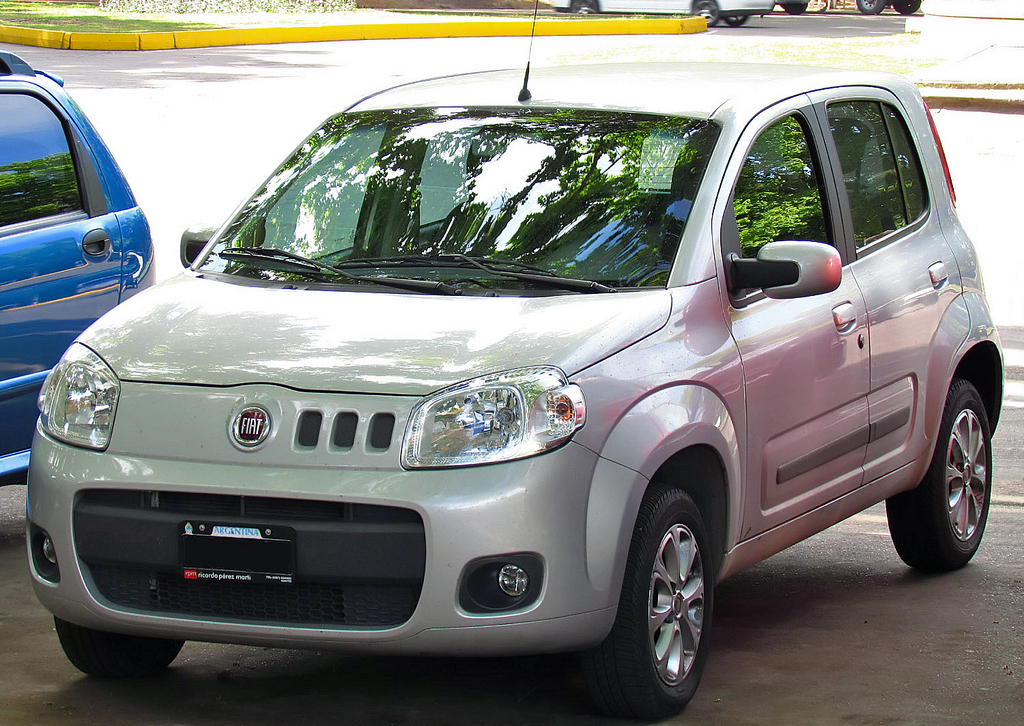

Overview
- Manufacturer: Fiat (Note: Fiat Auto (1983–2007) Fiat Group (2007–2014) FCA Italy (2014–2021))
- Also called: Fiat Mille; Innocenti Mille Clip; Fiat Grand Raid (Ecuador); Fiat Ranch (Colombia); Fiat Uno Origin
- Production: 1983–2021

Body and chassis
- Class: Supermini (B) (Type 146); City car (A) (Type 327)
- Layout: Front-engine, front-wheel-drive

Chronology
- Predecessor: Fiat 127
- Successor: Fiat Punto

The Fiat Uno is a supermini manufactured and marketed by Fiat. Launched in 1983, the Uno was produced over a single generation (with an intermediate facelift, 1989) in three and five-door hatchback body styles until 1995 in Europe and until 1 January 2014 in Brazil. Designed by Giorgetto Giugiaro of Italdesign, the Uno strongly recalled the high-roof, up-right packaging of Giugiaro's 1978 Lancia Megagamma concept, in a smaller configuration.

With over 8,800,000 built, it is the eighth most produced automobile platform in history, after the Volkswagen Beetle, Ford Model T, Fiat 124, 1965–1970 GM B platform, 1981–1997 GM J platform, 1961–1964 GM B platform, and 1977–1990 GM B platform.

The Uno name was reintroduced in 2010 in South America for the Fiat Mini (Economy) platform based car built in Brazil.

== First generation (1983) ==
First generation (Type 146)
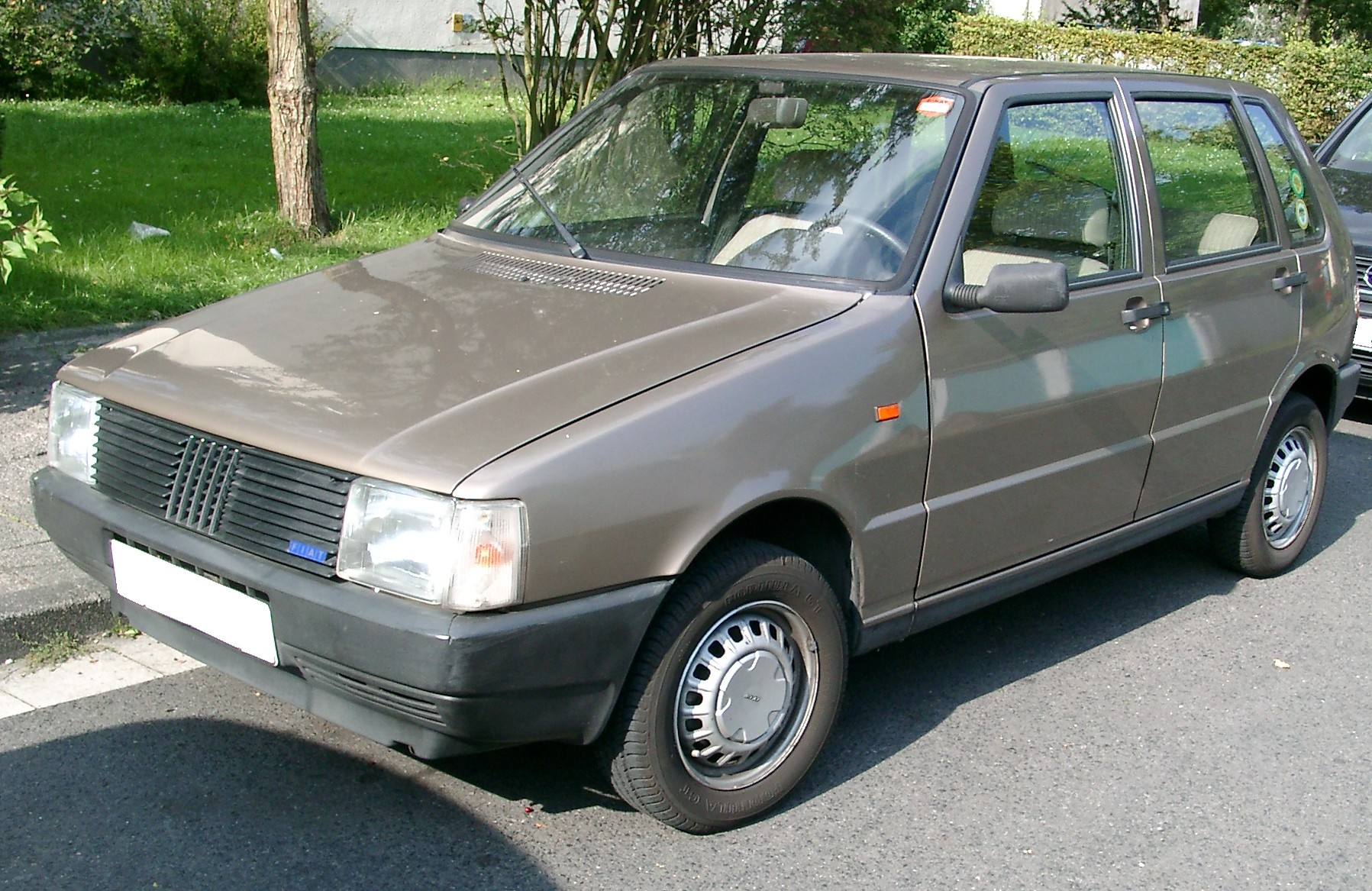
- A first generation five-door Uno

Overview
- Also called: Fiat Mille (Brazil); Innocenti Mille; Yugo Uno 45R (Yugoslavia)
- Production: 1983–1995 (Italy); 1984–2014 (Brazil); 1989–2004 (Argentina); 1988–1994 (Yugoslavia); 1989–1995 (Indonesia); 1992–1996 (Philippines); 1995–2000 (India); 1995–2000 (Turkey); 1995–2002 (Poland); 1995–2003 (Morocco)
- Assembly: Italy: Turin; Brazil: Betim; Argentina: Córdoba (Sevel/Fiat Córdoba); Ecuador: Manta; Indonesia: Jakarta (Gaya Motor); Morocco: Casablanca (Somaca); Philippines: Makati (Francisco Motors Corporation); Poland: Tychy (Fiat Auto Poland); South Africa: Pretoria; Turkey: Bursa (Tofaş); Yugoslavia: Kragujevac (Zastava)
- Designer: Giorgetto Giugiaro at Italdesign

Body and chassis
- Body style: 3/5-door hatchback 3-door panel van
- Platform: Type One
- Related: Fiat Duna; Fiat Elba; Fiat Fiorino (2nd series)

Powertrain
- Engine: Petrol: 903 cc 100-series I4; 999 cc FIRE I4; 1108 cc FIRE I4; 1116 cc 128 SOHC I4; 1301 cc 128 SOHC I4; 1301 cc 128 SOHC turbo I4; 1372 cc 146.C1 I4; 1372 cc 146.A8 turbo I4; 1498 cc 149.C1 I4; Diesel: 1301 cc 146.B1 I4; 1367 cc 146.B3 turbo I4; 1697 cc 146.B2 I4
- Transmission: 4- or 5-speed manual; Selecta CVT

Dimensions
- Wheelbase: 2,362 mm (93.0 in)
- Length: 3,645–3,689 mm (143.5–145.2 in)
- Width: 1,549–1,562 mm (61.0–61.5 in)
- Height: 1,405–1,422 mm (55.3–56.0 in)
- Curb weight: 711–910 kg (1,567–2,006 lb)

Chronology
- Predecessor: Fiat 127
- Successor: Fiat Punto (Europe); Fiat Palio; Fiat Mobi

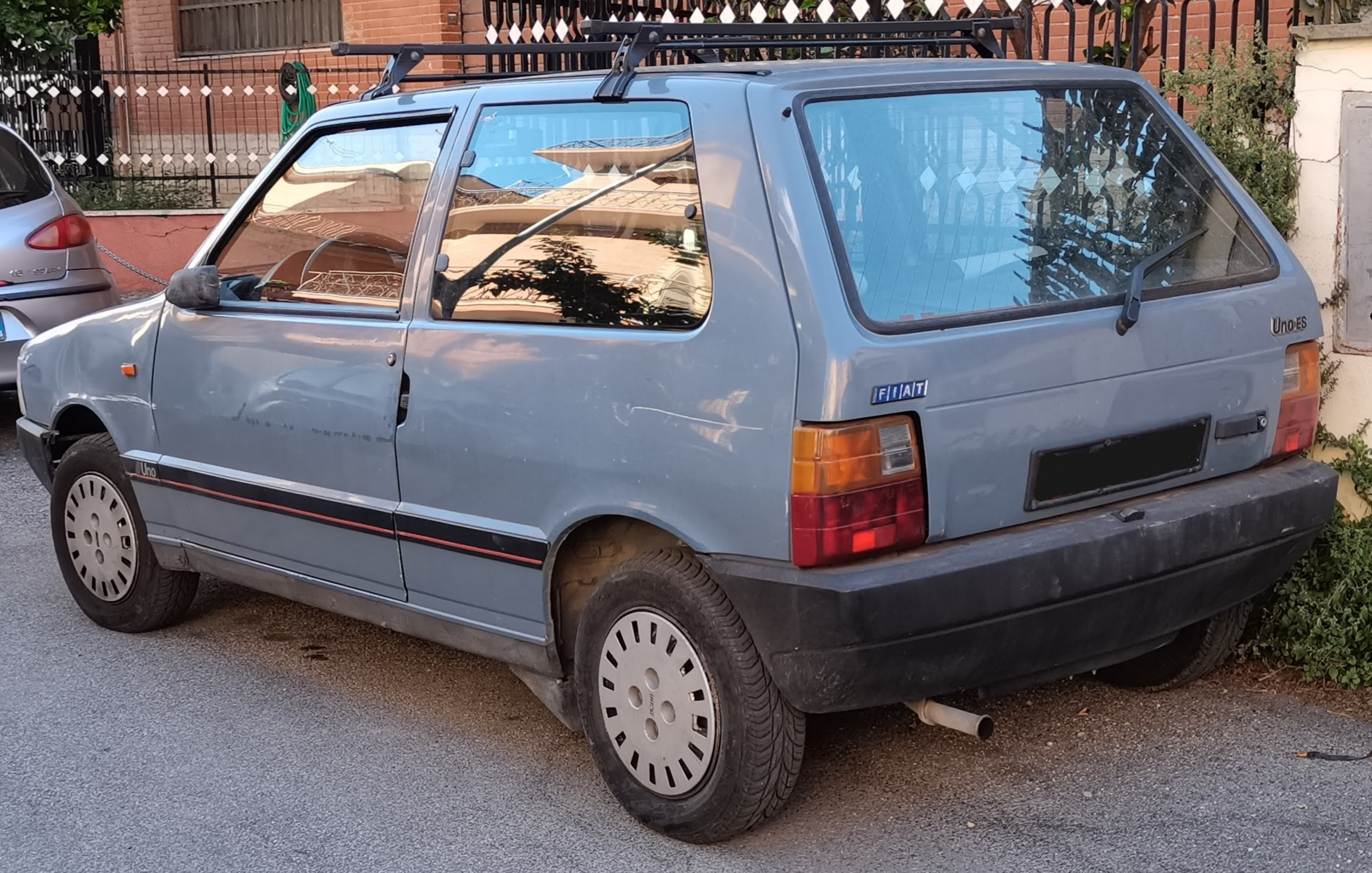
Fiat Uno 3-door

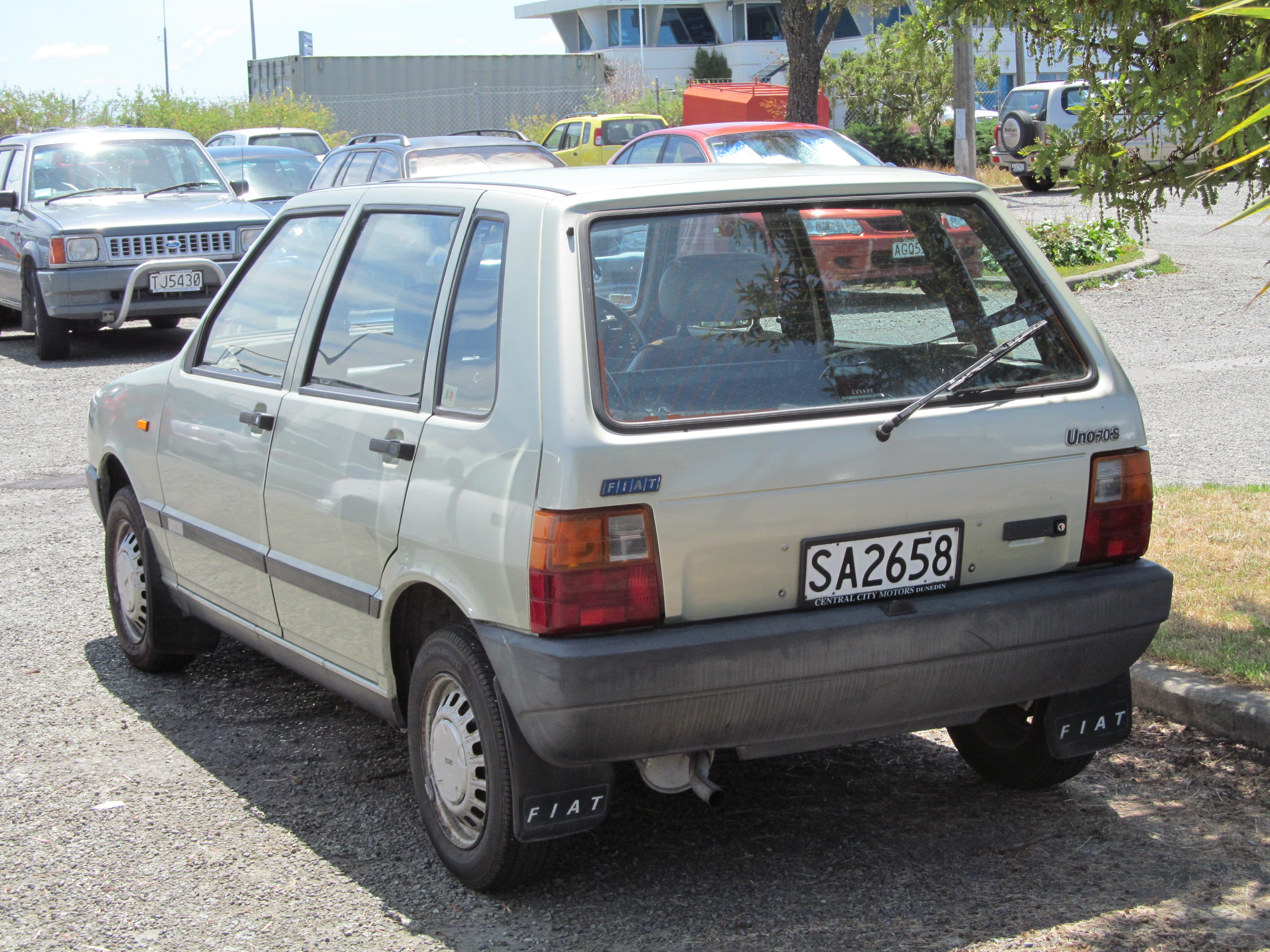
Fiat Uno 5-door

The Fiat Uno (Type 146) was launched in January 1983 to replace the Fiat 127. The tall, square body used a Kamm tail, achieved a drag coefficient of 0.34 and was noted for its interior space, fuel economy as well as its ride and handling. The project name was Tipo Uno ("Type 1"), as it followed the Tipo Zero (Panda). Following on from the Ritmo, manufacture of the Uno depended on the "Robogate" robotic body assembly system from Fiat's automation supplier Comau.

Launched a month before the Peugeot 205, a noted competitor, the Uno went on sale just after General Motors launched its new Opel Corsa supermini (marketed as the Vauxhall Nova in the UK). United Kingdom sales began in June 1983, with more than 20,000 sold in its first full year and peaking at more than 40,000 sales in 1988.

In December 1983, the Uno was European Car of the Year for 1984, finishing narrowly ahead of the Peugeot 205.

Initially, the Uno was offered with the 0.9 litre (903 cc) 100-series OHV, carried over from the 127, and 1.1 litre (1116 cc) and 1.3 litre (1301 cc) 128-series SOHC petrol engines and transmissions. Typical for Fiats of the era, the Uno's badging did not reflect engine size but indicated the metric horsepower output, rounded to the nearest five: 45, 55, 60, 70, or 75. The Uno was available as either a three- or five-door hatchback. It also featured ergonomic switchgear clusters each side of the main instrument binnacle, user-operable with hands on the steering wheel, with only a single steering column stalk to control the turn signals and horn - thus dispensing from Fiat's traditional three-stalk system that had been employed on its cars since the late 1960s.

The Uno had MacPherson strut independent front suspension and twist-beam rear suspension with telescopic dampers and coil springs.

From 1985, the 1.0 litre (999 cc) SOHC Fully Integrated Robotised Engine (FIRE) powerplant was offered, replacing the 0.9 litre unit. This was a lighter engine, built with fewer parts, and gave improved performance and economy. The most luxurious version, the single-point injected 75 SX i.e., had remote door locks, integrated front foglamps, and the oval exhaust tip also used on the Turbo.

=== Turbo i.e. ===
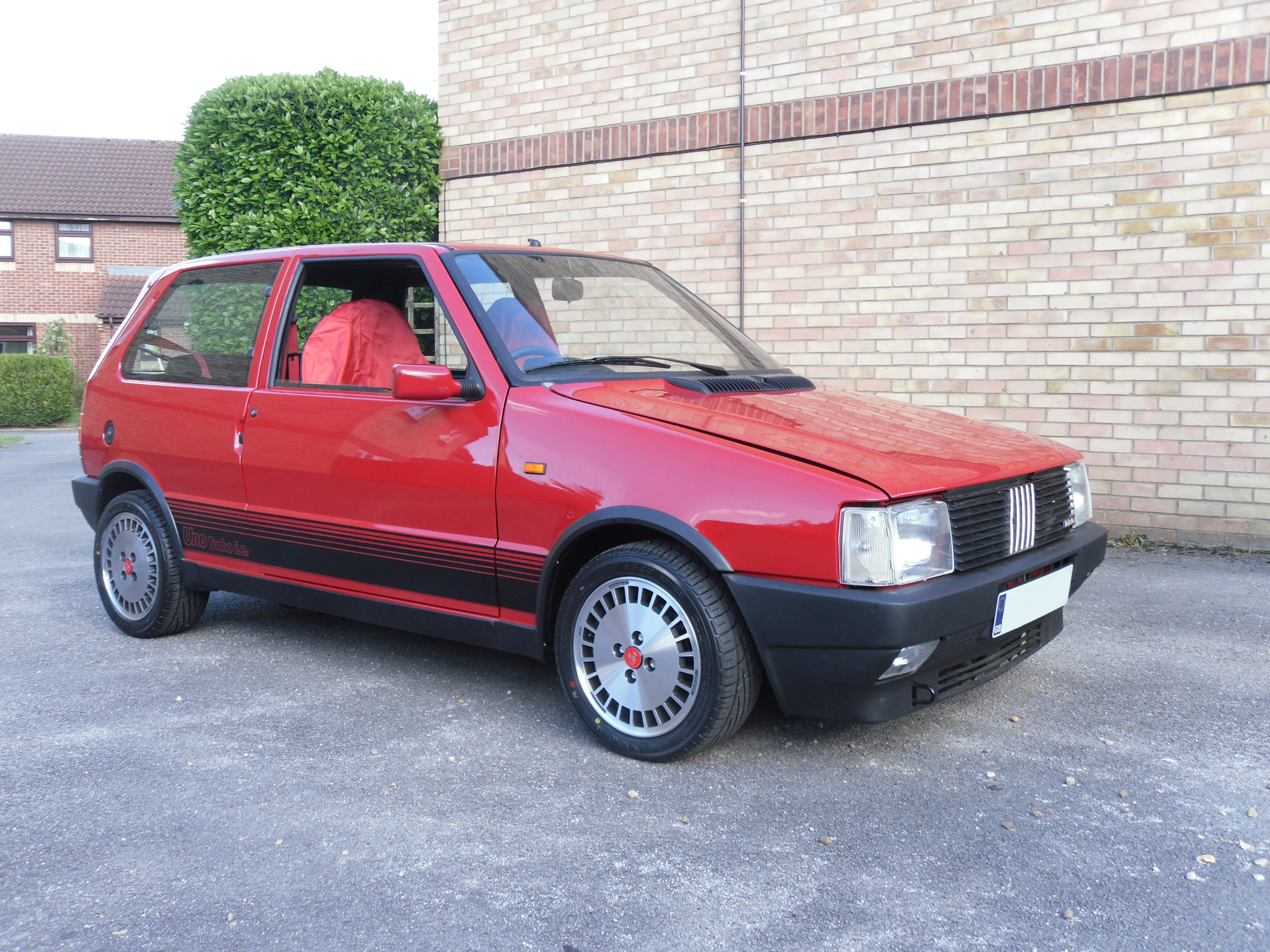
A 1988 Fiat Uno Turbo i.e. (UK-registered)

In April 1985, the hot hatch version of the first series Uno – the Uno Turbo i.e. – was launched as a three-door only derivative. The Turbo i.e. model used a Ritmo/Strada-derived 1.3 128-series engine with Bosch multi-point fuel injection, Magneti Marelli electronic ignition and a water-cooled IHI turbocharger with an intercooler to reduce intake air temperatures. Engine capacity was initially stated as 1299 cc but this was revised early on in production to 1301 cc. This change was a result of Italy's highway system allowing a higher speed limit to cars of more than 1300 cc. In both forms the engine offered 105 PS (77 kW; 104 hp) but owners report that the 1301 cc version was notably more responsive and had greater torque than the earlier 1299 cc unit. Cars built from 1985 to late 1987 were fitted with a Ritmo/Strada-derived five-speed gearbox. This was then replaced by a newly developed 'C510' five-speed gearbox, featuring a more durable differential and improved gearchange linkage. Ratios were unchanged between the two units. The Turbo reached 205 km/h (127 mph), establishing it as one of the fastest hot hatches of the 1980s.

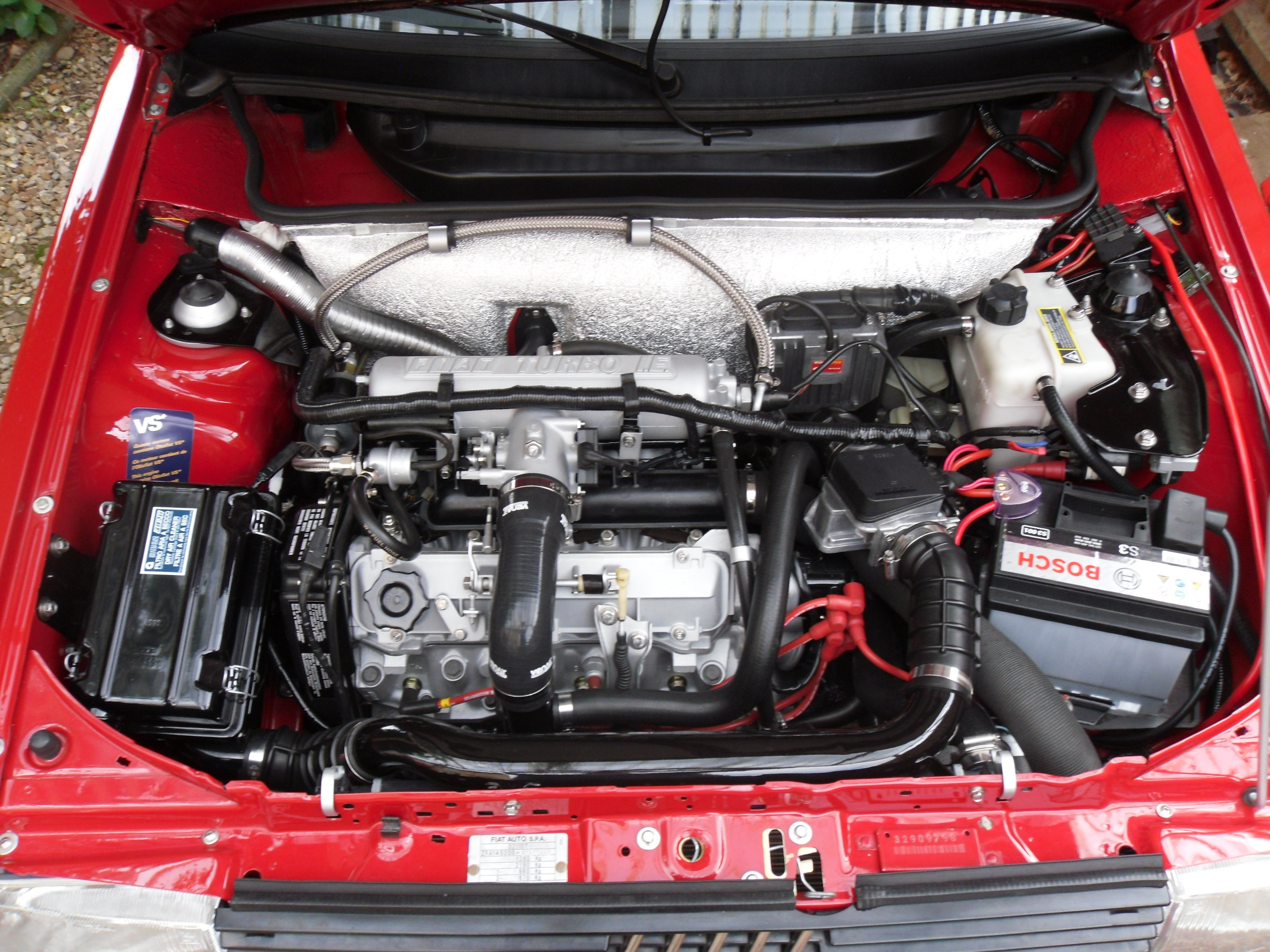
First Series Turbo i.e. Model Engine Bay

Externally, the Turbo i.e. model featured black plastic sill trims, arch extensions, fibreglass tailgate with spoiler, tinted side glass, side decals, revised front bumper with foglamps and inlets/scoops to direct air to the oil cooler and intercooler. Suspension was lowered and uprated, 13" alloy wheels with Pirelli P6 tyres were fitted and the brakes upgraded to vented discs on the front and solid discs on the rear.

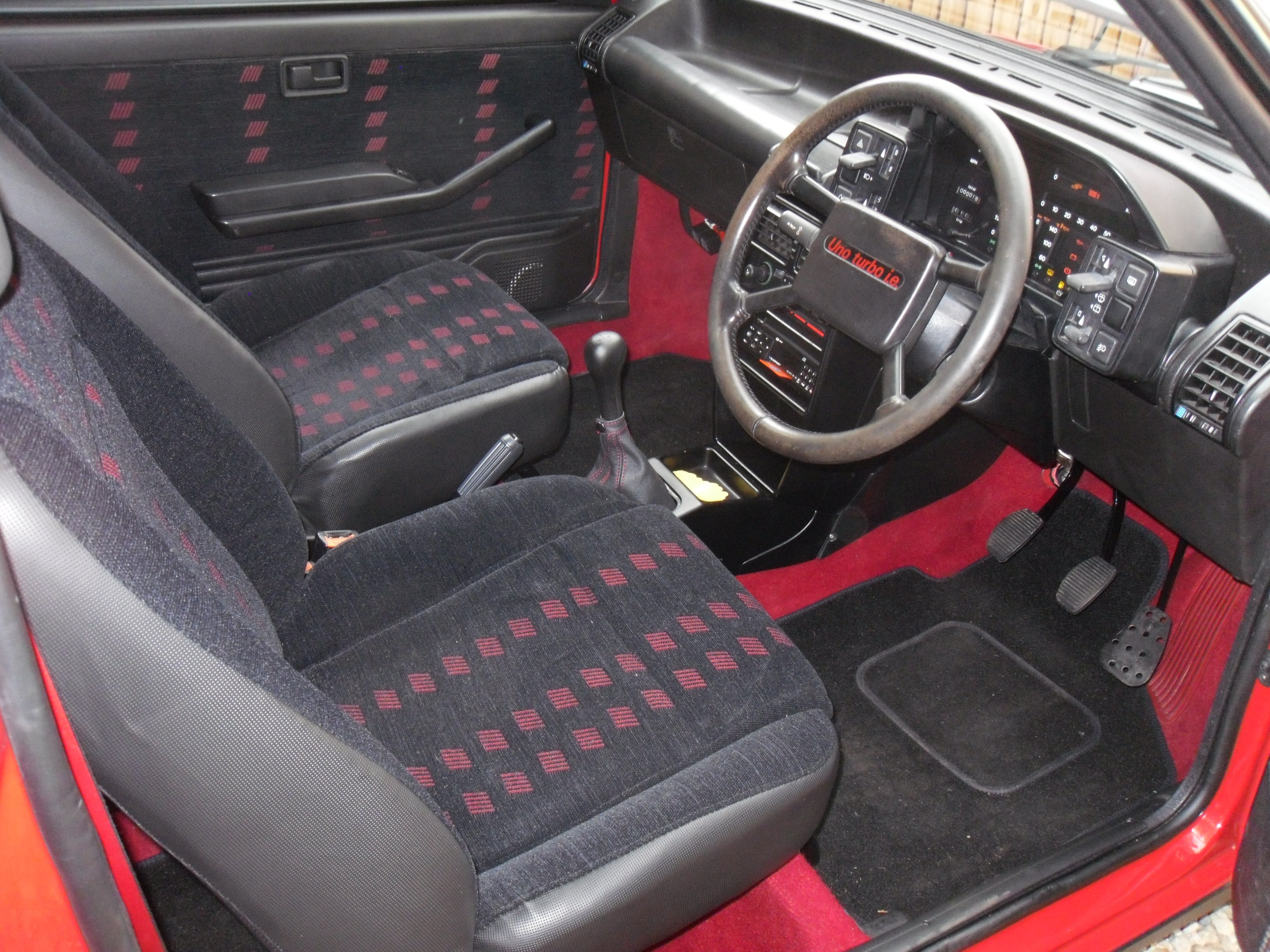
First Series Turbo i.e. Model Interior

The Turbo i.e. featured 'sports' seats, red carpet and an extended centre-console. Later models featured red seatbelts.

Options on the Turbo i.e. model included polished Cromodora wheels, electric windows, a manual sunroof and a digital instrument panel, the latter with bar-graphs for fuel level, coolant temperature, boost pressure, etc., and a digital speed display, switchable between km/h and mph.

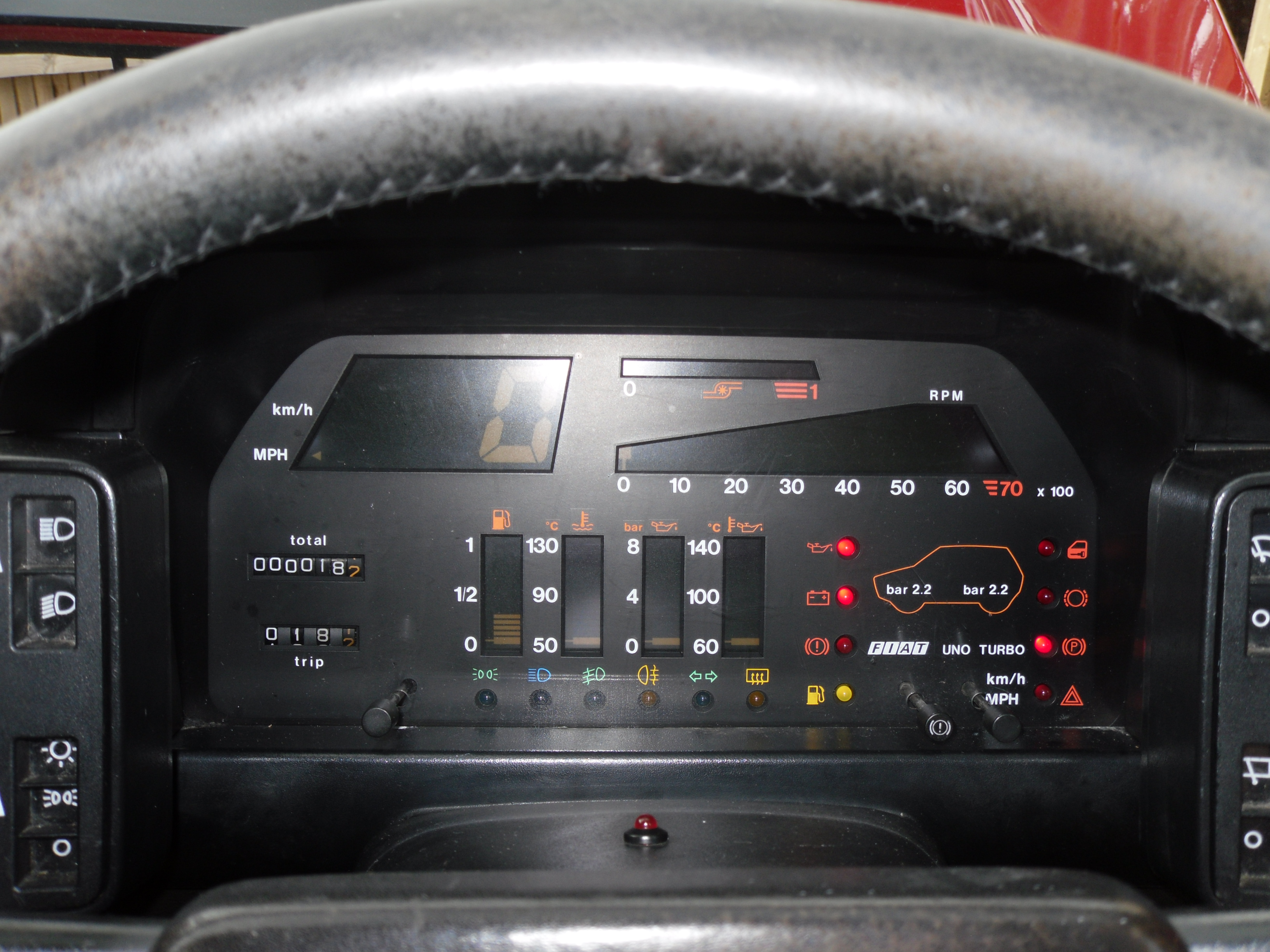
First Series Uno Turbo i.e. Model Digital Instrument Display

An option on later first series Turbo i.e. models included a simple form of ABS that only operated on the front wheels. The system operated once per ignition cycle, requiring an ignition-initiated reset, had the system been triggered.

=== Diesel and Selecta models ===
In mid-1983, the 1.3-litre diesel which had already been seen in the Fiorino and the 147 was installed in the Uno as well, originally only for the Italian market. The Brazilian-built engine was derived from 124-series engines, and was never sold in the United Kingdom. It was added to other European markets beginning in early 1984. Daily production in mid-1983 was 280 cars, out of a daily total of 2000. It was sold as the Uno D (three doors) or the Uno DS ("Super", five doors). This badging was the only external giveaway, while in the interior an oil pressure gauge was added. It also received extra sound insulation under the hood and along the firewall. The engine has 45 PS (33 kW), as did the smallest 903 cc petrol unit, but with considerably higher torque. There was a weight penalty: 121 kg (267 lb) for the Diesel rather than 79 kg (174 lb) for the 903. Additional accessories and sound deadening measures accounted for the remainder of the 100 kg (220 lb) weight difference, almost all of it over the front wheels.

In 1986, a 1.7 litre diesel engined 60DS version was launched together with the Uno Selecta continuously variable transmission (CVT) automatic. The 1.7L naturally aspirated diesel was the only diesel Uno sold in the UK. The CVT transmission was a co-development with Dutch Van Doorne and Ford, (Fiat owned a 24% stake of Van Doorne at that time). There was also a 1.4-liter turbodiesel (Uno Turbo D), which offered 72 PS (53 kW). This model was quick for a small diesel at the time, and had better acceleration than the petrol-engined Uno 70, while fuel consumption was about a third lower. Noise levels were actually marginally lower than those of the 70 SX. The suspension was firmer to accommodate the heavier engine, while an oil temperature gauge was standard fitment.

=== Uno CS ===
The Uno was also produced in Brazil, called Uno CS, and imported in some European countries. But it was a totally different car: it was riding on a Fiat 147-derived platform, with four-wheel MacPherson suspension (with transverse leaf spring at the rear). Visual differences from the European Uno were the fuel cap, placed on the left, and the bonnet, of a clamshell design and hinged at the front. It also had its own engines, part of the "Brazil" engine series.

=== Yugo Uno 45R ===
From 1988 to 1994, the first series Uno was assembled in Kragujevac, Yugoslavia by Zastava. It was fitted with a 903 cc 45 PS (33 kW) engine also used in the Yugo 45. Only the three-door version was available. Due to a higher price than the Yugo, the Uno 45R was discontinued in 1994, after 2,620 examples had been produced.

=== Facelift ===
First shown at the Frankfurt Motor Show in September 1989, the Uno received a facelift with revised front styling and revised tailgate, the latter improving the drag coefficient to Cd 0.30. The interior was revised with a new dashboard which dispensed with the pod-style switchgear in favour of conventional stalks on the steering column. The 1.1 litre engine was replaced by a FIRE version, and a Fiat Tipo-derived 1.4 litre (1,372 cc) engine replaced the 128/Ritmo/Strada-derived 1.3 litre in both naturally aspirated and turbo versions. A 1.4 litre Uno Turbo could reach a claimed 204 km/h (127 mph), while the 1.0 version only managed 140–145 km/h (87–90 mph) depending on which transmission was fitted. The Uno Turbo i.e. variant was also restyled, upgraded with a Garret T2 turbine, Bosch LH Jetronic fuel injection and better aerodynamics.

Uno production ended in Italy in 1995 with 6,032,911 manufactured in Fiat's Italian factories. From 1994 to 2002, Uno was manufactured in Poland for Fiat Auto Poland. Polish-made Unos were marketed in Italy until 1997 as the Innocenti Mille Clip. Polish production initially took place in Bielsko-Biała, and from 2000 to 2002 in Tychy. Engines available were three petrol units (all naturally aspirated and fuel injected) – 0.9 litre from Seicento (years 1999–2002 only), 1.0 fire, 1.4 and one naturally aspirated diesel unit of 1.7 litres.

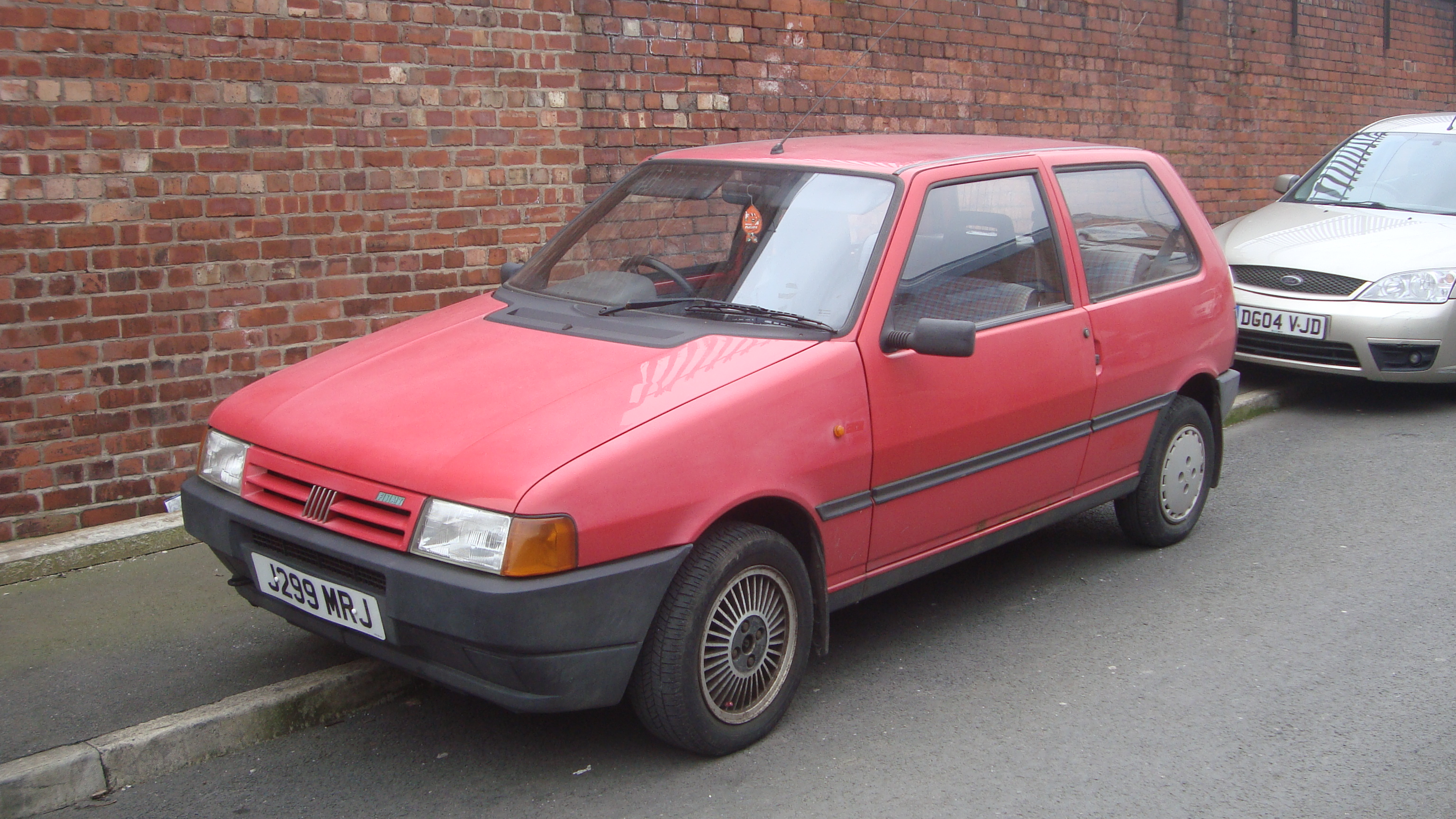
Facelift (3-door)

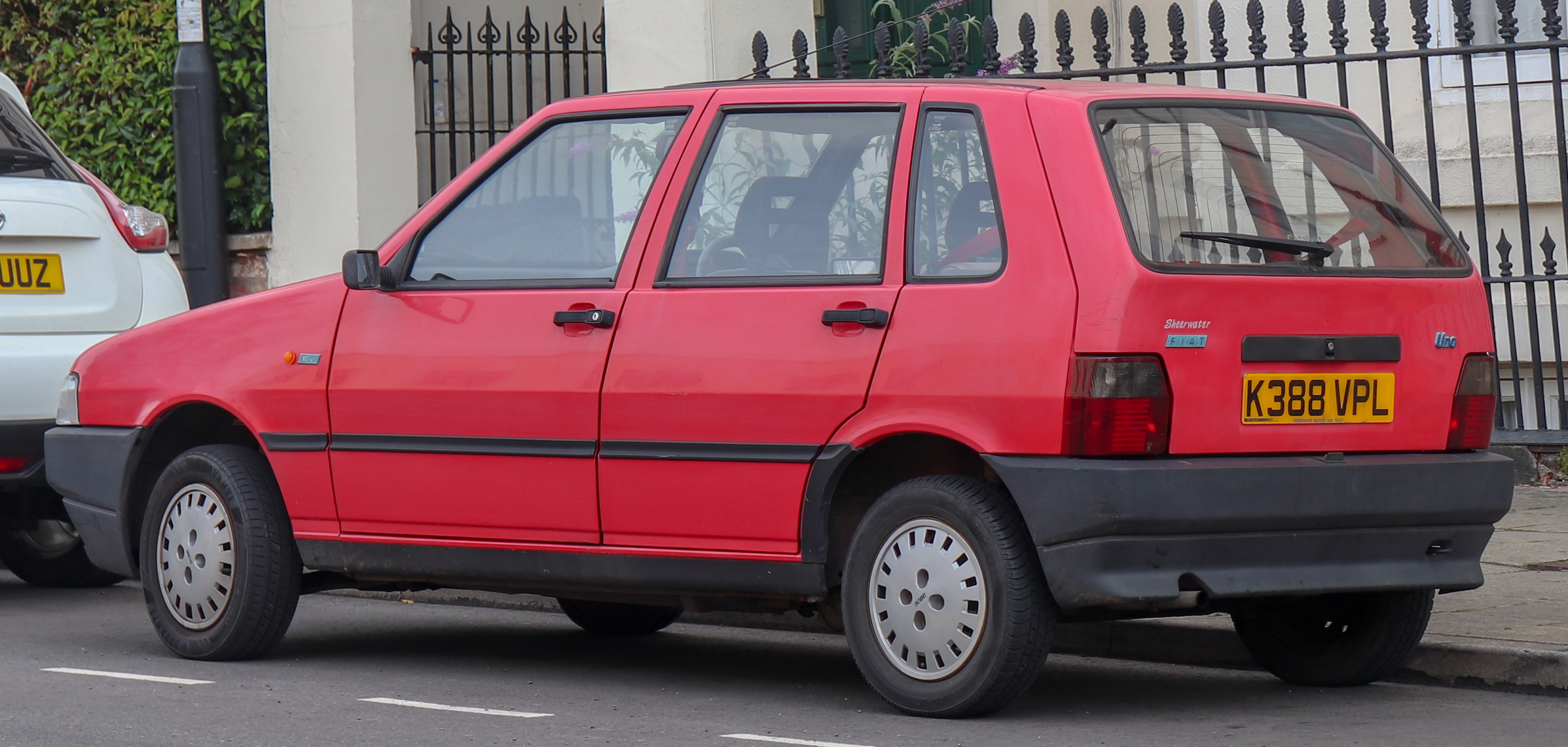
Facelift (5-door)

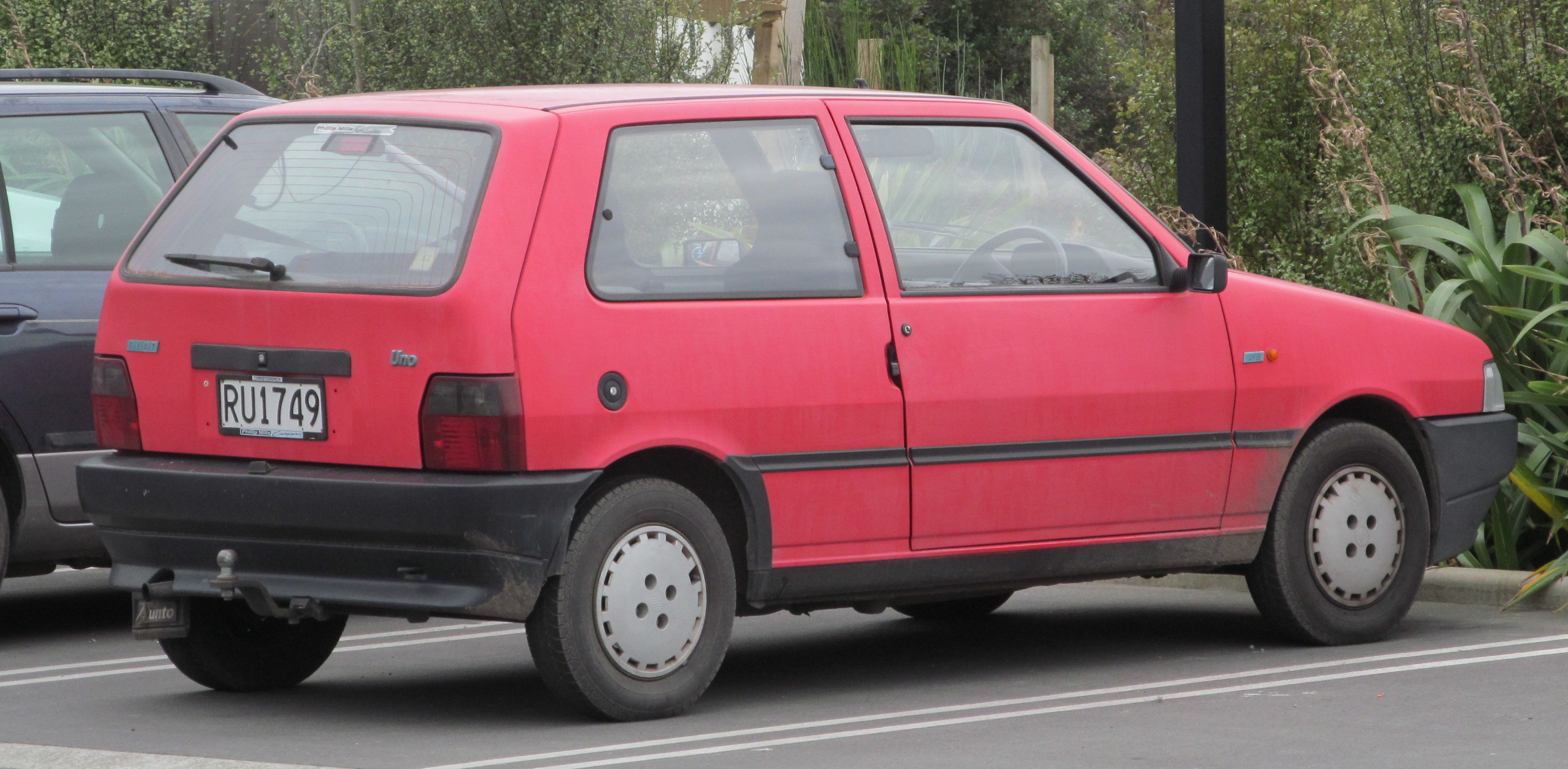
Facelift (3-door)

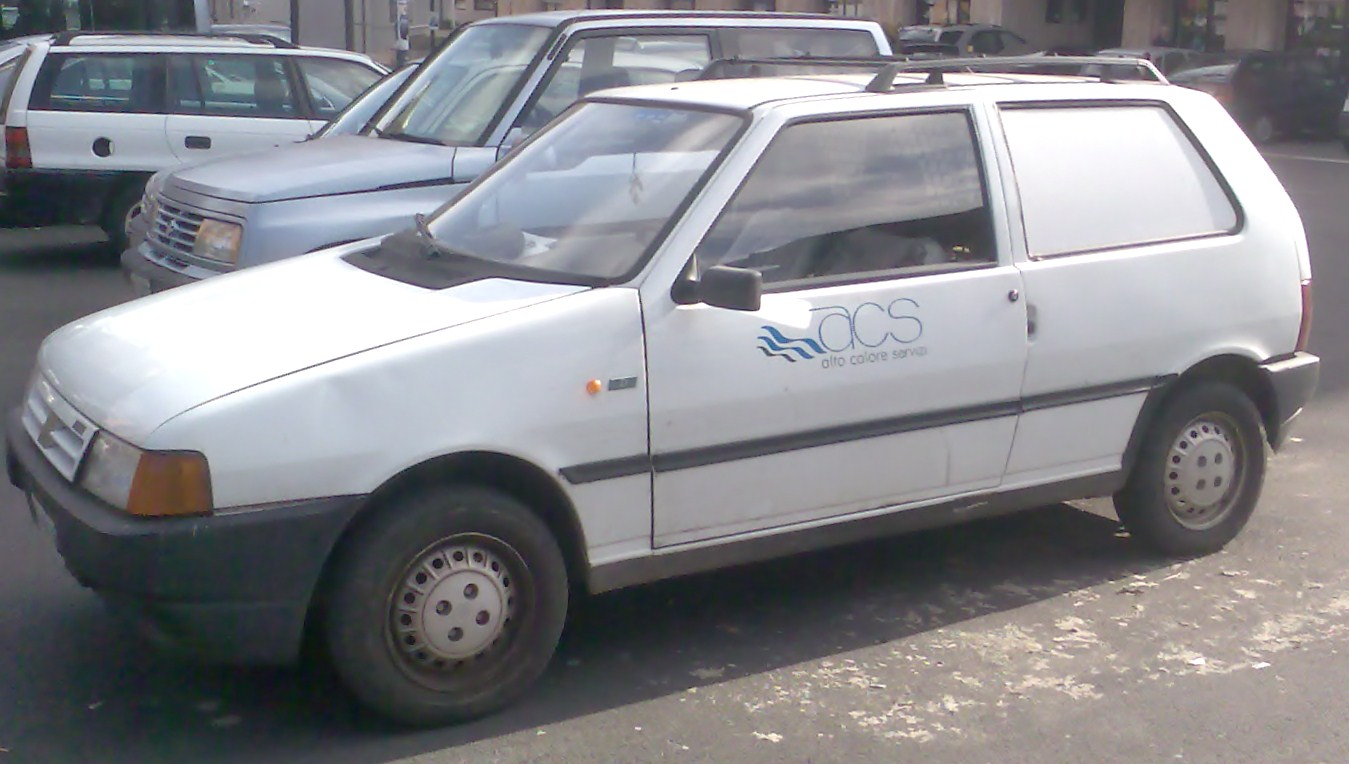
Fiat Uno Van

=== Engines (first and second series) ===
==== Petrol ====
Engine	Layout	Displacement	Valves	Power	Torque	Production
0.9 39	I4	899 cc	8 OHV	39 PS (29 kW) at 5500 rpm	65 N⋅m (48 lb⋅ft) at 3000 rpm	1999–2002
0.9 45	I4	903 cc	8 OHV	45 PS (33 kW) at 5600 rpm	67 N⋅m (49 lb⋅ft) at 3000 rpm	1983–1993
1.1 55	I4	1116 cc	8 OHC	55 PS (40 kW) at 5600 rpm	86 N⋅m (63 lb⋅ft) at 2900 rpm	1983–1985
1.3 70	I4	1301 cc	8 OHC	68 PS (50 kW) at 5700 rpm	100 N⋅m (74 lb⋅ft) at 2900 rpm	1983–1985
1.1 60	I4	1116 cc	8 OHC	58 PS (43 kW) at 5700 rpm	87 N⋅m (64 lb⋅ft) at 3000 rpm	1985–1992
1.0 45 Fire	I4	999 cc	8 OHC	45 PS (33 kW) at 5000 rpm	80 N⋅m (59 lb⋅ft) at 2750 rpm	1985–1994
1.1 60 Fire	I4	1108 cc	8 OHC	57 PS (42 kW) at 5500 rpm	89 N⋅m (66 lb⋅ft) at 3000 rpm	1989–1993
1.3 Turbo i.e.	I4	1299/1301 cc	8 OHC	105 PS (77 kW) at 5750 rpm	146 N⋅m (108 lb⋅ft) at 3200 rpm	1985–1990
1.3 70	I4	1301 cc	8 OHC	65 PS (48 kW) at 5600 rpm	100 N⋅m (74 lb⋅ft) at 3000 rpm	1985–1992
1.0 45 i.e.	I4	999 cc	8 OHC	45 PS (33 kW) at 5250 rpm	74 N⋅m (55 lb⋅ft) at 3250 rpm	1992–2002
1.4 70 i.e.	I4	1372 cc	8 OHC	72 PS (53 kW) at 6000 rpm	106 N⋅m (78 lb⋅ft) at 3000 rpm	1990–2002
1.5 75 i.e. CAT	I4	1498 cc	8 OHC	75 PS (55 kW) at 5600 rpm	113 N⋅m (83 lb⋅ft) at 3000 rpm	1987–1993
1.1 50 i.e. cat	I4	1108 cc	8 OHC	50 PS (37 kW) at 5250 rpm	84 N⋅m (62 lb⋅ft) at 3000 rpm	1991–1994
1.4 Turbo i.e.	I4	1372 cc	8 OHC	118 PS (87 kW) at 6000 rpm	161 N⋅m (119 lb⋅ft) at 3500 rpm	1990–1998

==== Diesel ====
Engine	Layout	Displacement	Valves	Power	Torque	Production
1.3D	I4	1301 cc	8 SOHC	45 PS (33 kW) at 4,200 rpm	76 N⋅m (56 lb⋅ft) at 2,000 rpm	1983–1989
1.4 TD	I4	1367 cc	8 SOHC	72 PS (53 kW) at 4,800 rpm	128 N⋅m (94 lb⋅ft) at 2,500 rpm	1986–1995
1.7 60D	I4	1697 cc	8 SOHC	58 PS (43 kW) at 4,600 rpm	100 N⋅m (74 lb⋅ft) at 2,900 rpm	1986–1995

=== Continuing global production (1995–2014) ===
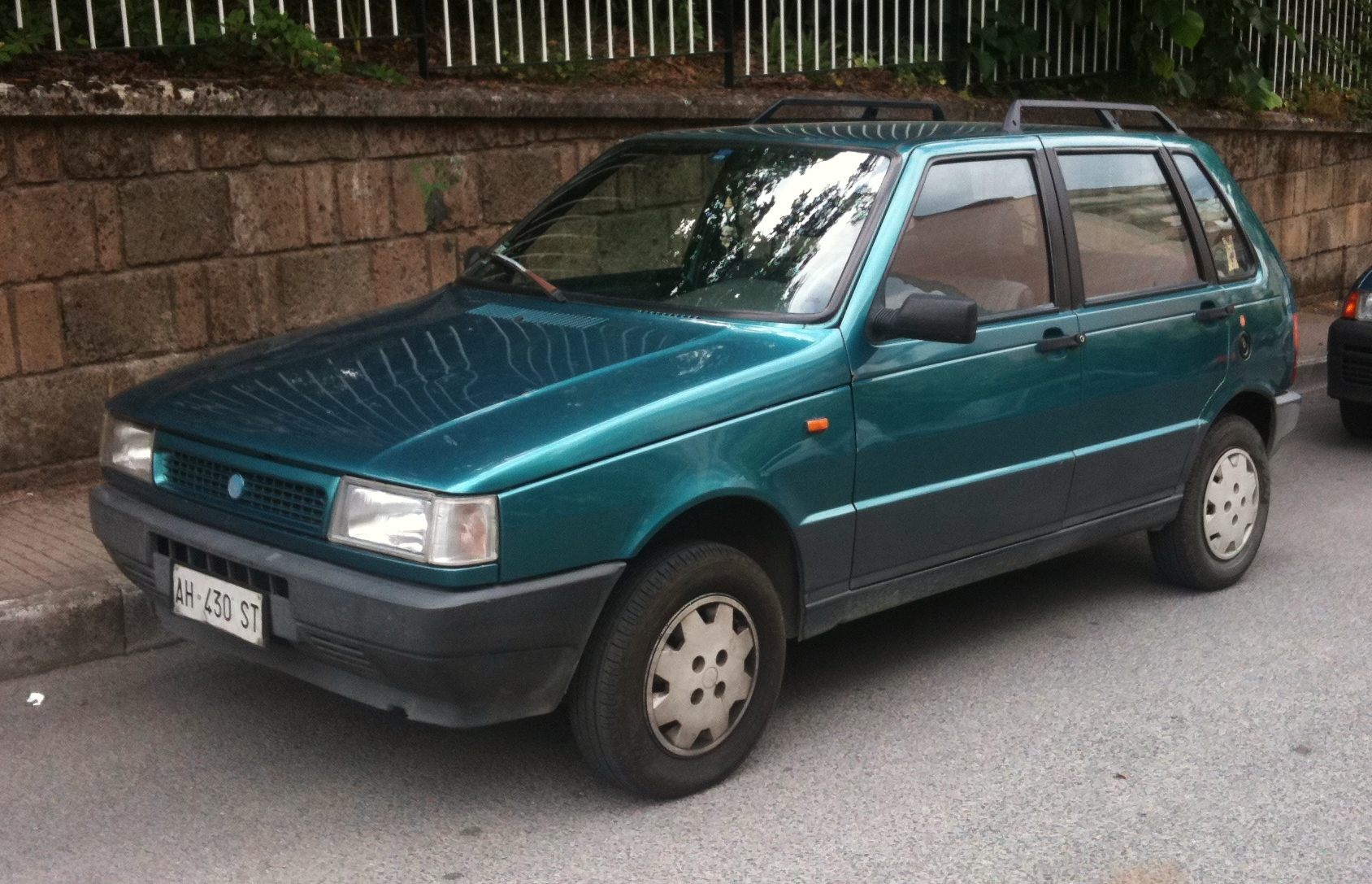
Brazilian-built Uno, sold as "Innocenti Mille" in Italy

After Western European production and sales ceased, the Uno continued to be manufactured and sold in many other regions.

==== Argentina ====
In Argentina, the 3-door Fiat Uno was produced by Sevel Argentina from March 1989 to 2000, 179,767 units were built. The Uno's Fiasa engines ranged from the 1,049 cc 52 PS (38 kW) petrol four to a 1.3 and 1.5 litre version, with a 1.3-litre 45 PS (33 kW) diesel engine also available. The 1.6-litre Lampredi SOHC 87 PS (64 kW) SCV/SCR version sat at the top of the range. A 1.7 liter diesel with 58 PS (43 kW) was added in 1992 and soon displaced the 1.3 option.

A sedan version with four doors was also produced from 1988 to 2001 under the name Duna and the station wagon version as Duna Weekend, more than 270.000 units were built in Fiat's Córdoba plant.

==== Brazil ====
The car was made in Brazil until January 2014 in three versions: Mille Economy, Uno Furgão (panel van) and Fiorino Furgão. A total of 3.6 million Unos and Milles were built in Brazil during its 30-year production run. During the 1990s it was imported in Italy as "Innocenti Mille".

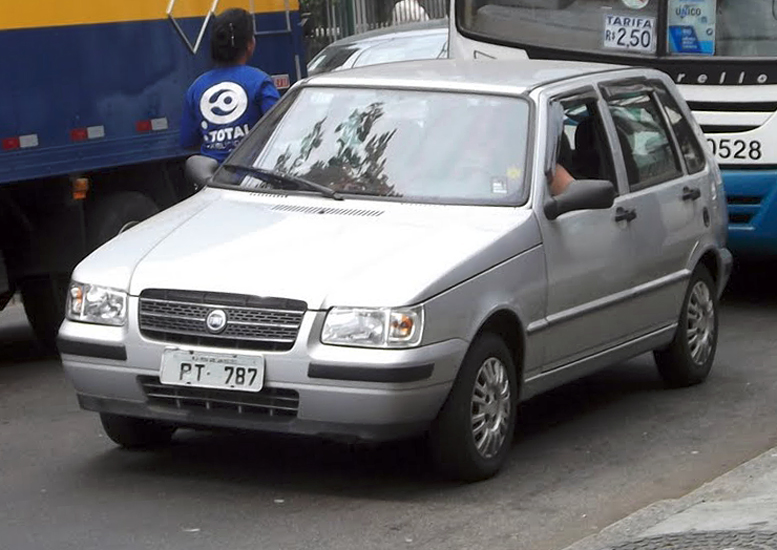
2004 facelift Fiat Uno

In the second half of the 1980s and the first half of the 1990s, the Uno was also available as a sedan, a pick-up, and in a wagon version. These are called Prêmio, Fiorino Pick-Up, and Elba respectively.

The Brazilian Uno featured an independent, transverse leaf spring suspension at the rear, based on that of the tried and tested Brazilian Fiat 147 (similar to the Italian Fiat 127). The clamshell design of the bonnet was also unique, since the Brazilian Uno kept the spare tyre located in the engine bay, like the old Fiat 147, thus saving extra space for the luggage in the boot. It was originally sold with 1.05, 1.3 or 1.5 litre petrol engines (also in versions made to run on ethanol), and a 1.6 litre was added to the lineup in 1989. The now redundant 1.5 was cancelled, but another 1.5 was introduced in 1991, this one derived from the 1.3.

The Brazilian Fiat Uno family was topped by a sporting turbocharged 1.4-litre inline-four version (118 HP), the Uno Turbo i.e. This model was available between 1994 and 1996 and was part of the regularly available lineup; 1801 units were produced.

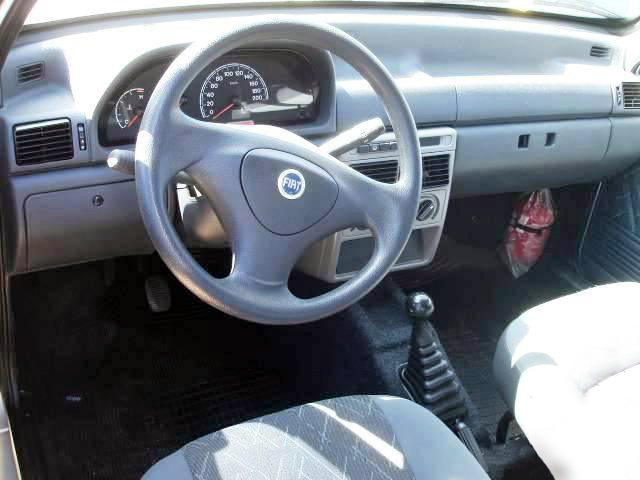
Modified interior of the 2004 facelift Fiat Uno

From 1990 to 2014, a 1.0 litre version was sold as the Fiat Mille, as a budget entry-level model, and received its most recent facelift for the 2004 model year. A Fire engine was used since 2001. The 2005 Brazilian range has received a Flex Fuel system, enabling the car to use ethanol or gasoline as fuel, both pure or in any proportion mixture; also, there is a version fitted for unpaved roads called Mille Way, which includes higher and a more resilient suspension, larger wheels and side cladding.

Despite the launch of the new Brazilian-built Uno in 2010, production of the Mille Economy and Mille Way continued until January 2014, only with a 1.0 litre engine. The Uno Furgão van was a light commercial version of the three-door Uno hatchback with blinded rear windows and no rear seat. It and the Fiorino Furgão were available with a 1.25 litre Fire engine.

===== Engines =====
Petrol

Engine	Layout	Displacement	Valves	Power	Torque	Compression ratio	Production
Mille	I4	994 cc	8 SOHC	48 PS (35 kW) at 5,700 rpm	7.4 kg⋅m (73 N⋅m; 54 lb⋅ft) at 3,000 rpm	8.5:1	1990.09–1994
Mille Electronic	I4	994 cc	8 SOHC	56 PS (41 kW) at 6,000 rpm	8.2 kg⋅m (80 N⋅m; 59 lb⋅ft) at 3,250 rpm	9.5:1	1995
1.0 Fire Flex	I4	999 cc	8 SOHC	Petrol: 65 PS (48 kW); Ethanol: 66 PS (49 kW) at 6,000 rpm	Petrol: 9.1 kg⋅m (89 N⋅m; 66 lb⋅ft); Ethanol: 9.2 kg⋅m (90 N⋅m; 67 lb⋅ft) at 2,500 rpm	12.15:1	2005–2014
1.3 CS, S, SX	I4	1,297 cc	8 SOHC	58 PS (43 kW) at 5,200 rpm	10.0 kg⋅m (98 N⋅m; 72 lb⋅ft) at 3,000 rpm	8.0:1	1984.07–1986 (SX until 1987)
1.3 Fire Flex	I4	1,242 cc	8 SOHC	Petrol: 70 PS (51 kW); Ethanol: 71 PS (52 kW) at 5,500 rpm	Petrol: 11.4 kg⋅m (112 N⋅m; 82 lb⋅ft); Ethanol: 11.6 kg⋅m (114 N⋅m; 84 lb⋅ft) at 2,500 rpm	11.0:1	2005–2013
1.5 i.e.	I4	1,497 cc	8 SOHC	67 PS (49 kW) at 5,000 rpm	12.0 kg⋅m (118 N⋅m; 87 lb⋅ft) at 3,000 rpm	8.5:1	1994–1995
1.5R	I4	1,497 cc	8 SOHC	85 PS (63 kW) at 5,500 rpm	13.5 kg⋅m (132 N⋅m; 98 lb⋅ft) at 3,000 rpm	???	1987–1989
1.5R - Ethanol	I4	1,497 cc	8 SOHC	86 PS (63 kW) at 5,500 rpm	13.7 kg⋅m (134 N⋅m; 99 lb⋅ft) at 3,000 rpm	???	1987–1989
1.6R	I4	1,581 cc	8 SOHC	Petrol: 84 PS (62 kW) at 5,700 rpm Ethanol: 84 PS (62 kW) at 5,600 rpm	Petrol: 13.2 kg⋅m (129 N⋅m; 95 lb⋅ft); Ethanol: 13.7 kg⋅m (134 N⋅m; 99 lb⋅ft) at 3,250 rpm	8.3:1	1990.11–1992
1.6R MPI ACT	I4	1,581 cc	8 SOHC	94 PS (69 kW) at 5,750 rpm	13 kg⋅m (130 N⋅m; 94 lb⋅ft) at 3,500 rpm	9.5:1	1993–1995
1.4 Turbo i.e.	I4	1,372 cc	8 SOHC	118 PS (87 kW) at 5,750 rpm	17.5 kg⋅m (172 N⋅m; 127 lb⋅ft) at 3,500 rpm	7.8:1	1994–1995

==== India ====
After an abortive launch in 1996 when its CKD joint partner PAL delivered only 617 cars of the 30,000 ordered, Fiat started its venture as a 50-50 Industrial Joint Venture between Fiat Group Automobiles S.p.A. (Fiat) and Tata Motors Limited in January 1997. At present the company employs about 600 employees in its Ranjangaon facility in the Pune District of Maharashtra.

==== Morocco ====
The Fiat Uno was also assembled in Morocco until 2003 by SOMACA (Société Marocaine des Constructions Automobiles), and was a popular choice of car for "petit-taxi" use.

==== Turkey ====
The Uno was first assembled in Turkey in 1994 and the production ran until 2000. Only the five-door bodystyle was assembled in Turkey. The engine options were 1.4, and 1.4 i.e. The fully equipped version was named Uno Hobby; it offered power steering and AC. It also differed from regular Unos in being available only in one colour option, sky blue with silver bumpers.

==== South Africa ====
In South Africa, the Uno was assembled under licence by Nissan from 1990 until 1998 and then by Fiat from 1998 up until 2006. Unos manufactured by Nissan had the word "licence" underneath the Fiat badge on the rear end and models included the 1,108 cc FIRE, 1,372 cc PACER, PACER SX and 1,372 cc TURBO. Later on there were also a number of special editions produced which included the Beat (1,372 cc), the Rio (1,108 cc) and for a short period the Cento (999 cc). After Fiat re-entered the South African market in 1998 Unos were rebadged as either the (1,108 cc) Mia or (1,372 cc) Tempo. They also featured the Fiat centenary badge from that point on. By the time initial production of the Uno ended in 2006 only the (1,108 cc) Mia was available for sale. 110,000 units were produced between 1990 and 2002.

In 2007, the Fiat Uno was redesigned and it re-entered the South African new car market. The car was now marketed and distributed by Fiat themselves. The model line-up includes the Uno Way, which has a higher suspension than the regular Uno and colour-coded bumpers. It is based on the 1983–1990 design, and is powered by a 1.2 litre 4-cylinder petrol engine.

==== Philippines ====
Local manufacturer Francisco Motors, primarily known as a manufacturer of the Jeepney, partnered with Fiat to create a joint venture called Italcar Pilipinas Inc. in 1990. They assembled the Fiat Uno from 1992–1996 under the People's Car Program, which was an incentive by the government of President Corazon Aquino to stimulate car production in the Philippines. The joint venture hoped to compete with the Toyota Corolla and Nissan Sentra with the Uno in the taxicab market, which accounted for many sales. The Uno was not popular and production decreased yearly until the venture was terminated in 1996.

==== Poland ====
Production in Fiat's factory in Poland ran until 2002. 173,382 units were built from June 1995 to October 2002. It was imported in Italy as Innocenti Mille Clip.

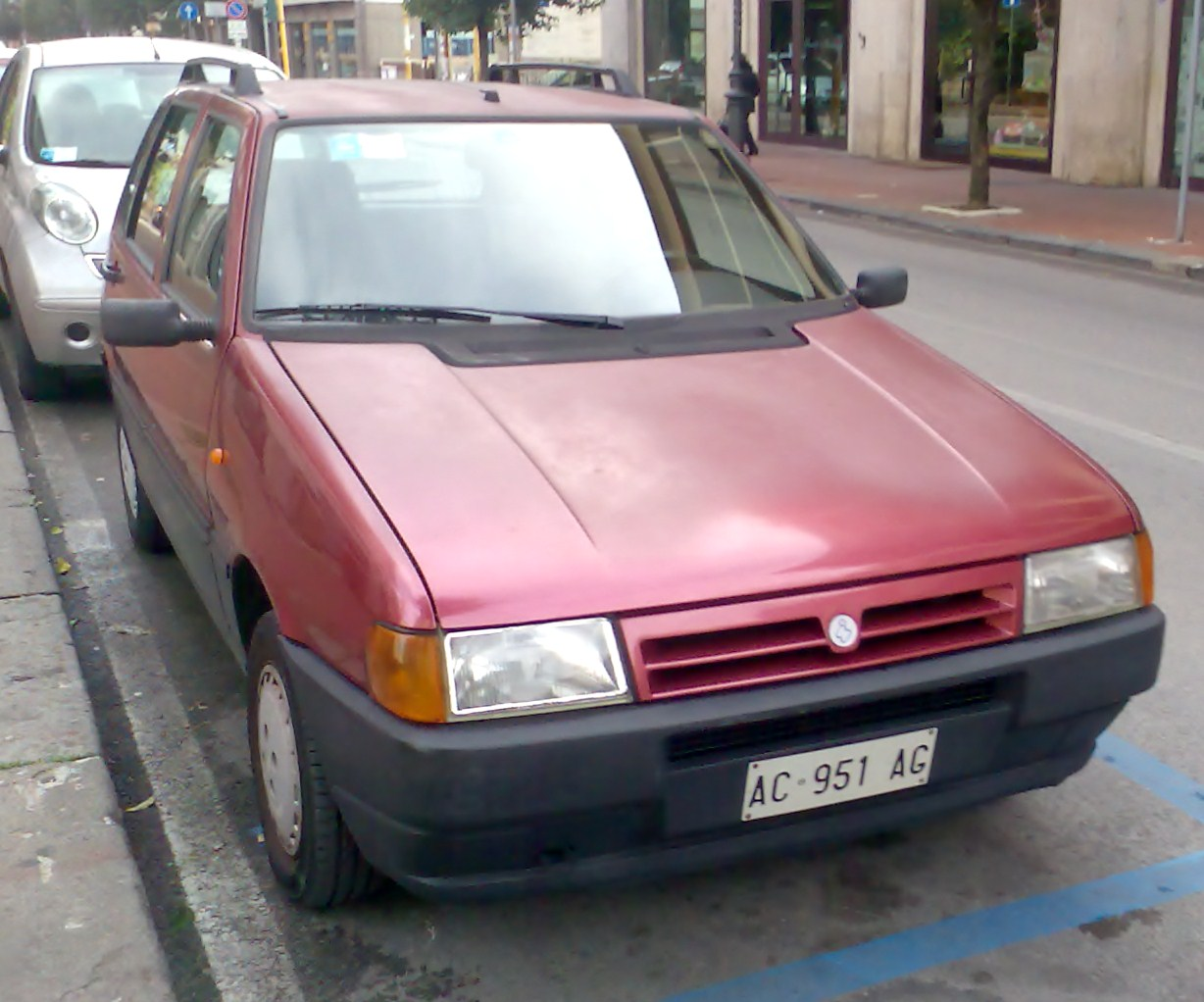
A Polish Uno marked Innocenti for the Italian market

==== Pakistan ====
The Fiat Uno is also assembled from complete knock down (CKD) kits in Pakistan by Raja Motor Company. Production started in 2001 and continued until 2004 when the manufacturing plant had to be closed down. Only the diesel variant of the car was made available under the 1.7D model. Although large scale manufacturing of the car has ceased, stocks of CKD are still being assembled and sold at present.

=== Sales performance ===
==== United Kingdom ====
Around 300,000 examples of the Uno were sold in Britain between 1983 and 1995, with the MK1 proving more popular than the MK2. It was one of the most popular imported cars in Britain during the 1980s, peaking at more than 40,000 sales in 1988. However, by March 2019 there were just 232 examples of either generation still in use.

== Second generation (2010) ==
Second generation (Type 327)
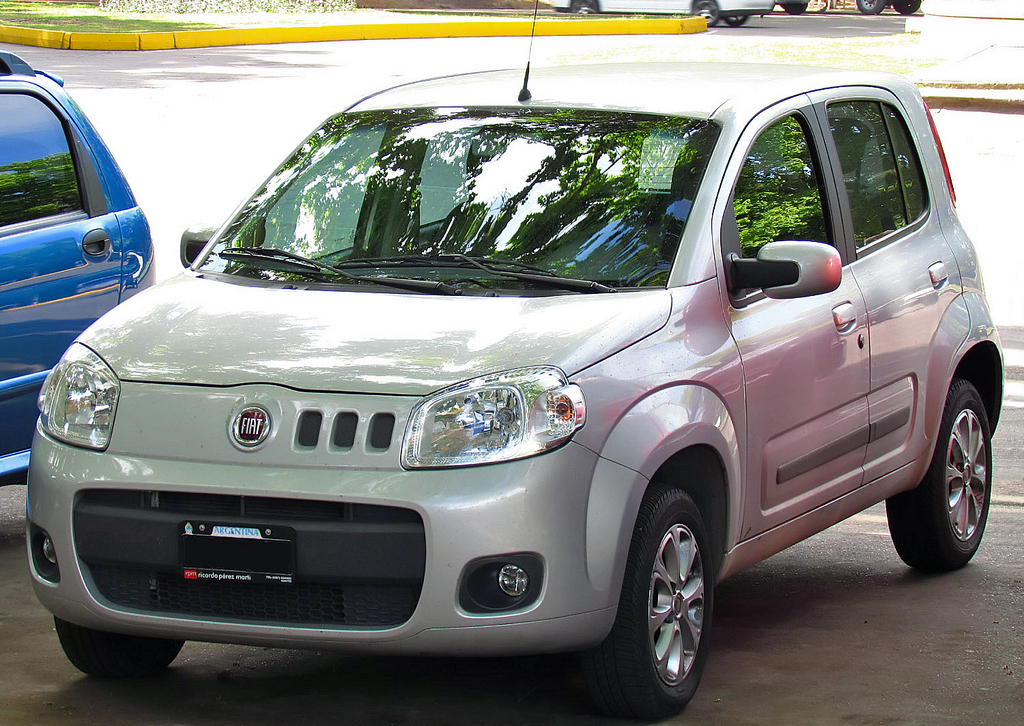

Overview
- Production: 2010–2021
- Assembly: Brazil: Betim (FCA Brasil)

Body and chassis
- Class: City car (A)
- Body style: 3/5-door hatchback
- Platform: FCA Economy
- Related: Fiat Palio (326); Fiat Grand Siena; Fiat Fiorino (327); Fiat Mobi

Powertrain
- Engine: flex fuel: 1.0 L FireFly I3; 1.0 L FIRE Evo I4; 1.3 L FireFly I4; 1.4 L FIRE Evo I4
- Transmission: 5-speed manual 5-speed Dualogic semi-auto

Dimensions
- Wheelbase: 2,376 mm (93.5 in)
- Length: 3,770 mm (148.4 in)
- Width: 1,640 mm (64.6 in)
- Height: 1,490 mm (58.7 in)

Chronology
- Predecessor: Fiat Mille (Brazil)
- Successor: Fiat Mobi

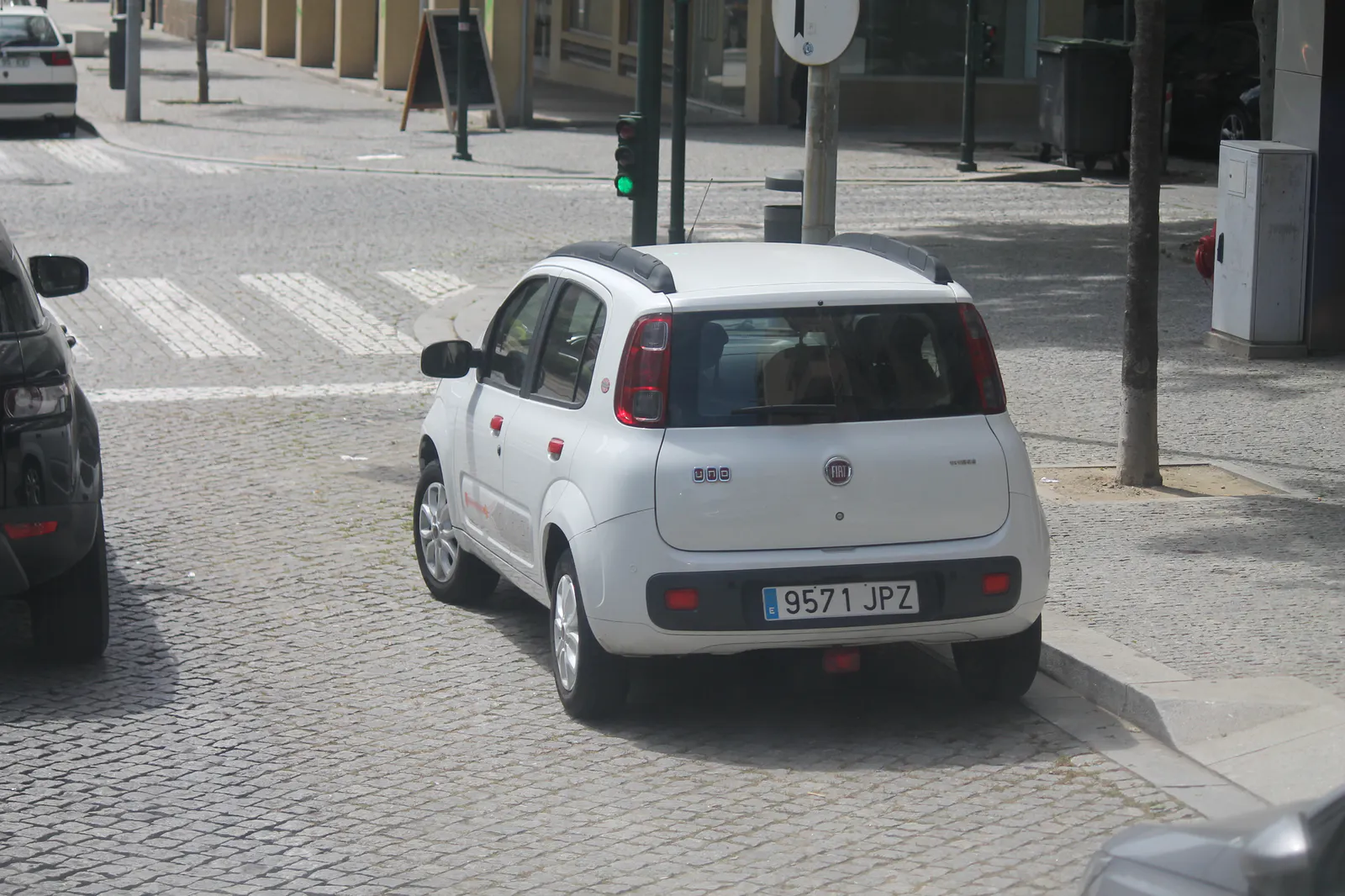
Fiat Uno College 2014

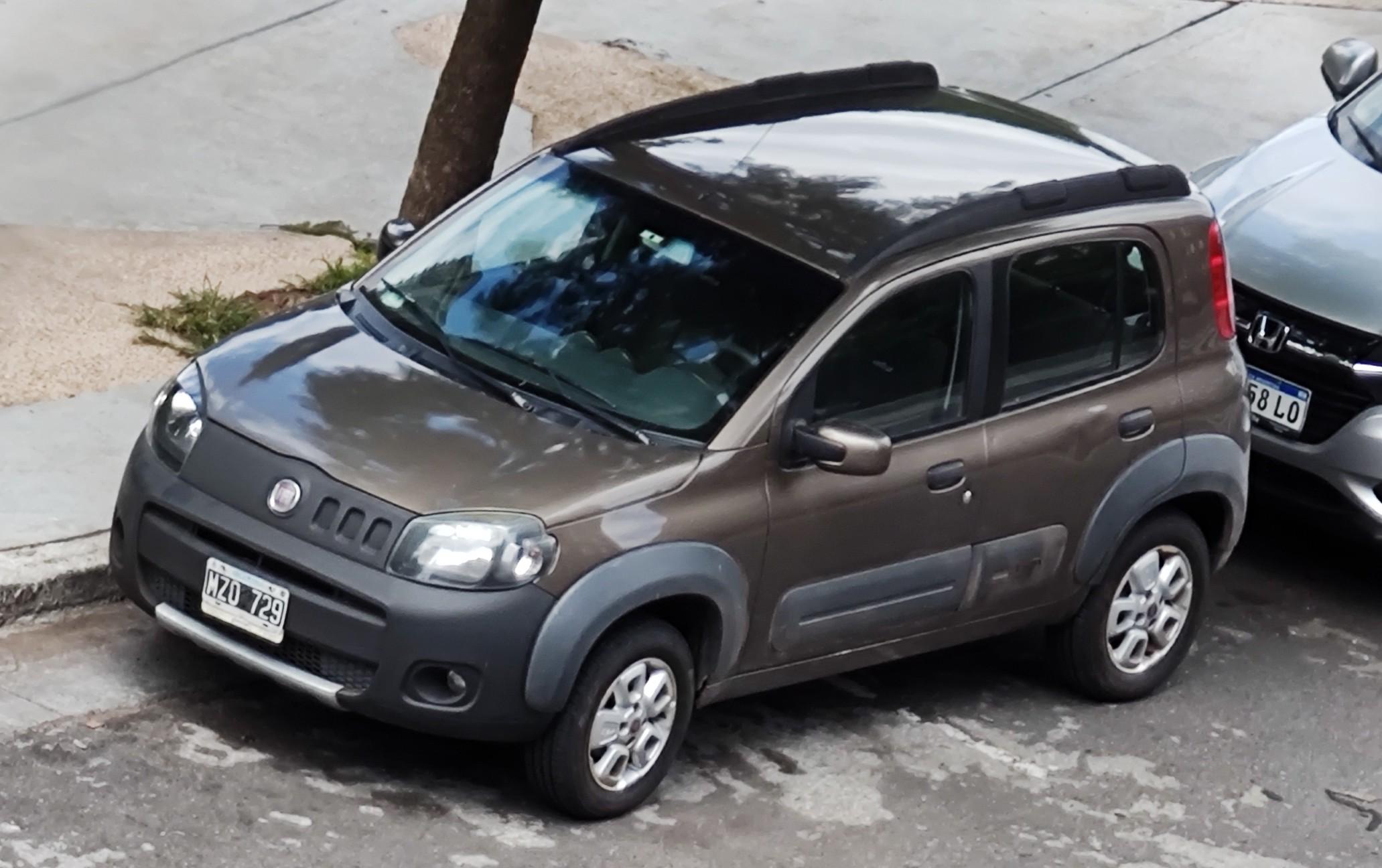
Fiat Uno Way 2013 In Argentina

The Fiat Uno name was resurrected for project Type 327, the Brazilian-built "Novo Uno" (New Uno). The new Uno is engineered at Brazil and co-designed with Turin's Centro Stile Fiat, and is basically a more urban interpretation of the Fiat Panda style on a Fiat Palio. It is larger and roomier than the first, but smaller and cheaper than the second. The car has two options of engines: the 1.0 Fire Evo (74 hp) and the 1.4 Fire Evo (87 hp), both able to use ethanol, gasoline or a mix of both fuels.

It was sold in Brazil and several other South American countries. The Novo Uno remained for Latin America only, and was not exported to Europe.

In December 2013, Fiat launched the new Uno-based Fiorino panel van (project Type 327). In September 2014, Fiat unveiled a facelift for the Uno and introduced the Start & Stop system in the 1.4 Fire engine.

In 2016, Fiat launched another facelift for the Uno and introduced the Firefly engine, available as a 1.0 or a 1.3-litre engine.

In 2018, Fiat removed the Way and Sporting trims and their versions with the GSR semi-automatic transmission, and added a new "Drive" version to be the new base model and only kept that and the "Attractive" version only with the 1.0 Firefly engine. In mid-2018, the Way version was brought back in with both 1.0 and 1.3 engines.

In 2021 the model was no longer offered with the Firefly engine, reverting to the old 1.0 73/75 PS Fire Evo, and now only in the Attractive version – the Way, Sporting, and Drive versions were discontinued. Production ended at the end of 2021 with the Fiat Uno Ciao limited edition, built in 250 units. Fiat Brazil manufactured a total of 4,379,356 Fiat Unos at its Betim plant across all generations.

=== Safety ===
A Brazilian Fiat Uno was tested by Latin NCAP in 2011 and was rated highly unsafe, scoring only one star for adult occupants and two stars for children. Another test made in 2013 rated zero stars.

Latin NCAP 1.0 test results Fiat Novo Uno Evo - NO Airbags (2011, based on Euro NCAP 1997)
Test	Points	Stars
Adult occupant:	2.00/17.0	1 /5 stars
Child occupant:	20.73/49.00	2 /5 stars

=== Fiat Uno Cabrio (Concept) ===
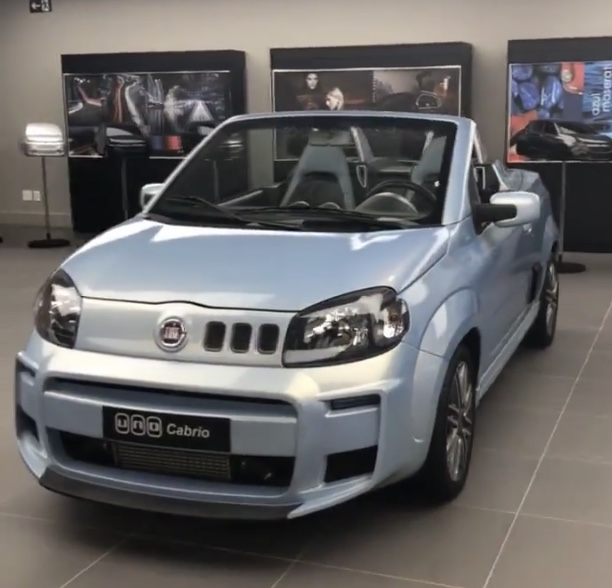
Fiat Uno Cabrio at Centro Stile FCA Latam

At the São Paulo International Motor Show in October 2010 the Uno Cabrio concept car was presented; the prototype has two seats and a body kit. The engine is the 1.4 Fire T-Jet 16V that produced 152 HP.

== Sales ==
Year	Brazil
1988	38,196
1989	42,563
1990	63,640
1991	94,861
1993	147,012
1994	221,627
1995	250,464
1996	203,249
1997	92,973
2001	114,539
2002	96,760
2003	96,965
2004	92,813
2005	119,496
2006	115,129
2007	128,502
2008	141,874
2009	168,499
2010	229,108
2011	273,552
2012	255,812
2013	184,376
2014	122,269
2015	79,360
2016	34,646
2017	34,332
2018	15,239
2019	20,034
2020	22,942
2021	20,558
2022	784
2023	40
2024	20
