= Pedro Ivo Ferreira Caminhas =

Brazilian politician (1952–2021)

Member of the Legislative Assembly of Minas Gerais
- In office 4 January 2001 – 2011

Deputy Mayor of Betim
- In office 1 January 2009 – 1 January 2013

Betim City Councilor
- In office 1993–2001

Personal details
- Born: 7 September 1952; Araçuaí, Fourth Brazilian Republic
- Died: 11 April 2021 (aged 68); Betim, Brazil
- Political party: PODE

Pedro Ivo Ferreira Caminhas (7 September 1952 – 11 April 2021) was a Brazilian politician.

== Biography ==
A member of Podemos, he served on the Legislative Assembly of Minas Gerais from 2001 to 2011 after having served on the City Council of Betim from 1993 to 2001. He was also Deputy Mayor of Betim from 2009 to 2013.

Pedro Ivo Ferreira Caminhas died of COVID-19 in Betim on 11 April 2021 at the age of 68.
