= Chiara Biondini =

Brazilian politician (born 2002)

Member of the Legislative Assembly of Minas Gerais
- Incumbent
- Assumed office 1 February 2023

Personal details
- Born: 22 February 2002 (age 24)
- Party: Progressistas
- Parent: Eros Biondini (father)

Chiara Teixeira Biondini (born 22 February 2002) is a Brazilian politician serving as a member of the Legislative Assembly of Minas Gerais since 2023. She is the daughter of Eros Biondini.
