= Fiat Mobi =

City car produced by Fiat

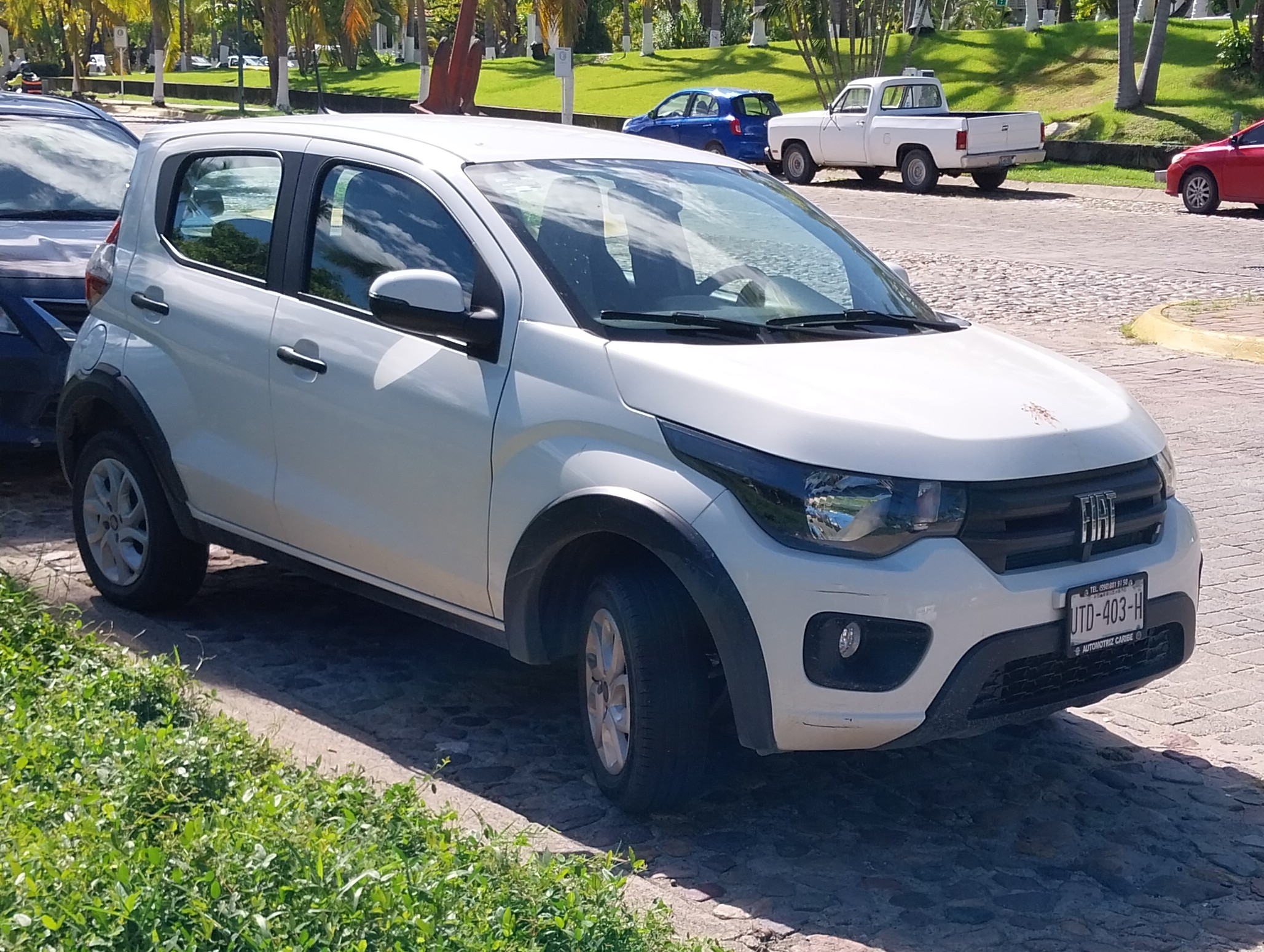

Overview
- Manufacturer: Fiat Automobiles
- Production: 2016–present
- Assembly: Brazil: Betim, Minas Gerais

Body and chassis
- Class: City car (A)
- Body style: 5-door hatchback
- Platform: FCA Economy
- Related: Fiat Novo Uno

Powertrain
- Engine: Petrol: 1.0 L FIRE Evo I4 flex fuel; 1.0 L FireFly I3 flex fuel

Dimensions
- Wheelbase: 2,305 mm (90.7 in)
- Length: 3,566 mm (140.4 in)
- Width: 1,633 mm (64.3 in)
- Height: 1,490 mm (58.7 in)
- Curb weight: 907 kg (2,000 lb)

Chronology
- Predecessor: Fiat Mille; Fiat Uno (2010)

The Fiat Mobi is a city car produced by the Italian car manufacturer Fiat since 2016; is available exclusively for the South American market. The Mobi hatchback in the A-segment manufactured in Betim, Minas Gerais, Brazil. It was released on 13 April 2016. This Brazilian project was derived from the same platform as the second generation Fiat Uno, in addition to the engine and transmission.

It was created to be a direct competitor of Volkswagen Up!, with similar dimensions and characteristics, including the rear glass cover in the Up! since 2011.

== Overview ==
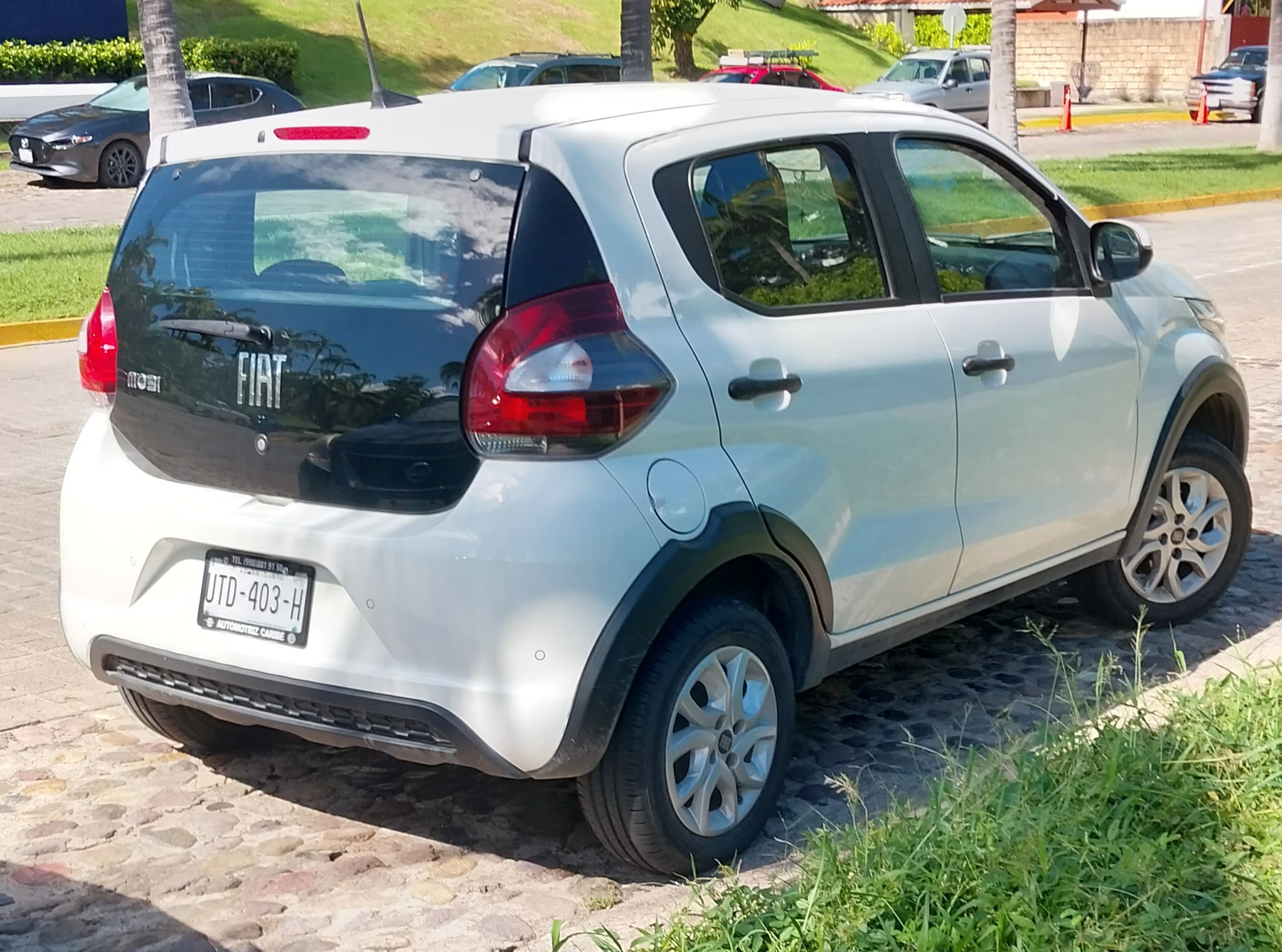
Rear view

In November 2014, rumours began about an alleged city car, which was codenamed "Project 341" or "X1H", which would be launched by Fiat in the beginning of 2016. On 13 April 2016, Fiat presented the Mobi's first official prototype, after various images released on the Internet and the information that had already appeared on some automotive magazines, confirming the rumours about this new vehicle.

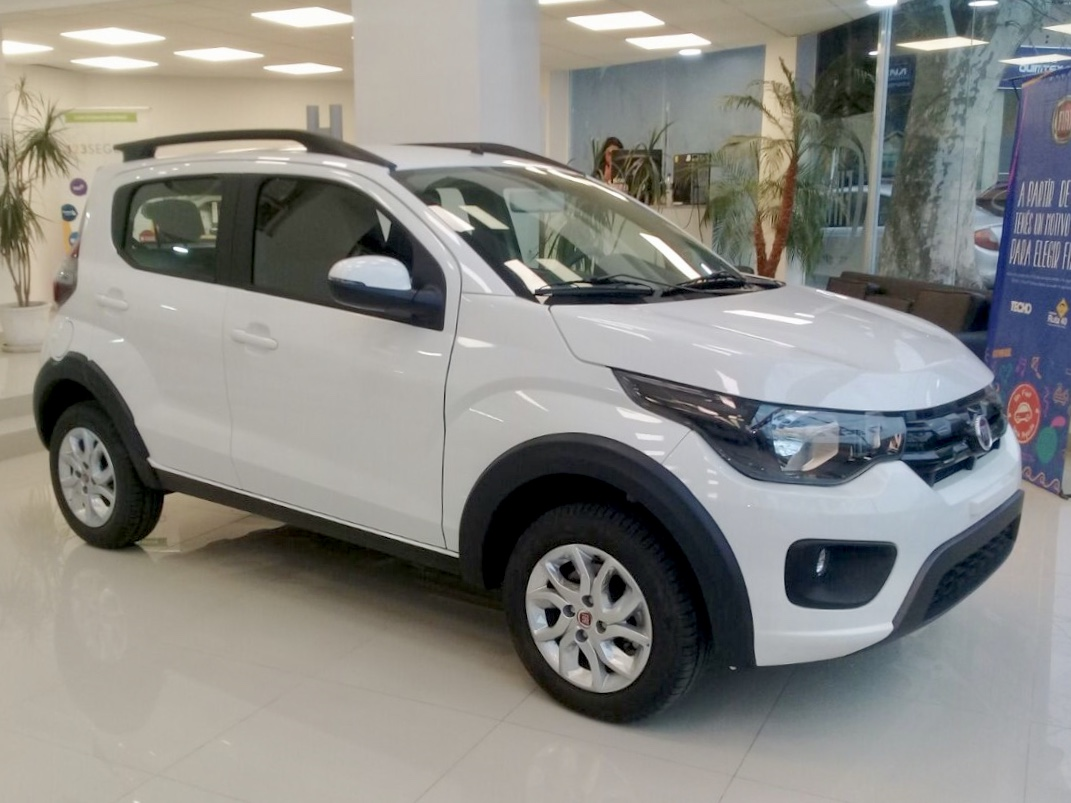
Fiat Mobi Way

It replaces the Fiat Mille, and replace the basic version of Fiat Uno called the Vivace and would come to compete with the other market leaders in the A-segment of the market with other models like Volkswagen up! and the Renault Kwid. The "X1H," which would also be derived from the Uno, would share its platform, engine, and transmission.

It is the second smallest Fiat for the South American market, with dimensions even lower than the Fiat Uno and Fiat Palio, only being larger than the Fiat 500.

The only engine available initially is the four-cylinder FIRE Evo Flex 1.0 75 HP ethanol blend, which yields 75 or 73 hp (55 or 54 kW) t 6250 rpm when fueled with ethanol and gasoline respectively, and 97 and 93 N⋅m (72 and 69 lb⋅ft) of torque at 3850 rpm. The FIRE engine was updated in 2022 to comply with the PROCONVE Level 7 emission protocol.

The Mobi initially shipped with a five-speed manual transmission, which was replaced with an automated manual gearbox along with the release of a new 1.0L three cylinder Firefly engine. The exterior of Mobi is somewhat similar to that of the Fiat Panda, but has a front grille inspired by Fiat Fullback, Fiat Toro, and Fiat Tipo.

It's offered in three different versions called Mobi Easy, Mobi Easy Pack Top, and Mobi Way, each with different internal and technological features.

== Safety ==
The Mobi has front disc brakes.

The Mobi in its most basic Latin American version with 2 airbags and no ESC received 1 star for adult occupants and 2 stars for infants from Latin NCAP 2.0 in 2017.

Latin NCAP 2.0 test results Fiat Mobi + 2 Airbags (2017, based on Euro NCAP 2008)
Test	Points	Stars
Adult occupant:	19.20/34.0	1 /5 stars
Child occupant:	26.98/49.00	2 /5 stars

== Sales ==
Calendar year	Brazil	Mexico	Argentina	Uruguay
2016	28,731	N/A	3,250	N/A
2017	54,270	5,265	16,910	N/A
2018	49,491	4,516	12,435	N/A
2019	53,444	3,545	5,264	679
2020	46,617	2,549	3,138	229
2021	65,855	3,441	1,071	932
2022	72,760	1,605	2,393	3
2023	73,433	2,601		
2024	67,375	2,285		
2025	73,013			
Subtotal	584,989	20,921	44,461	1,843
Total	652,214			
