= Tadeuzinho =

Brazilian politician (born 1986)

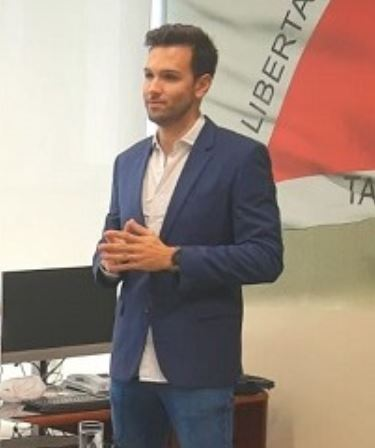
- Tadeuzinho in 2024

President of the Legislative Assembly of Minas Gerais
- Incumbent
- Assumed office 1 February 2023
- Preceded by: Agostinho Patrus

Personal details
- Born: 2 September 1986 (age 39)
- Party: Brazilian Democratic Movement
- Parent: Luiz Tadeu Leite (father)

Luiz Tadeu Martins Leite, better known as Tadeuzinho (born 2 September 1986), is a Brazilian politician. He has been a member of the Legislative Assembly of Minas Gerais since 2011, and has served as president of the assembly since 2023. He is the son of Luiz Tadeu Leite.
