= Leonardo Fernandes Moreira =

Brazilian politician (1974–2020)

Leonardo Fernandes Moreira (July 20, 1974 – December 1, 2020) was a Brazilian businessman and politician who served as a member of the Legislative Assembly of Minas Gerais for two consecutive terms from 2003 until 2011.

Fernandes was the son of Edmar Moreira, another former member of the Legislative Assembly of Minas Gerais. The elder Moreira became famous in Brazil was constructing a large castle as his home.

In 2020, Leonardo Fernandes Moreira was hospitalized for 43 days at Monte Sinai Hospital in Juiz de Fora following an emergency appendectomy. Fernandes died at the hospital of a heart attack on December 1, 2020, at the age of 46. He was survived by his wife and three children.
