= Luiz Humberto Carneiro =

Brazilian politician (1953–2021)

Member of the Legislative Assembly of Minas Gerais
- In office 1 January 2003 – 17 April 2021

Personal details
- Born: 24 March 1953; Uberlândia, Fourth Brazilian Republic
- Died: 17 April 2021 (aged 68); Uberlândia, Brazil
- Political party: PSDB

Luiz Humberto Carneiro (24 March 1953 – 17 April 2021) was a Brazilian politician and farmer. A member of the Brazilian Social Democracy Party (PSDB), he served on the Legislative Assembly of Minas Gerais from 2003 to 2021.

== Biography ==
Born in Uberlândia, Carneiro grew up in a family of farmers, a profession which he continued. His public life began in 1990 when he joined the Rural Union of Uberlândia, of which he was president until 1998. He served as Municipal Secretary of Agriculture of Uberlândia from 1991 to 1995 and Municipal Secretary of Housing from 1995 to 1999.

Carneiro was elected to the Legislative Assembly of Minas Gerais in 2002 and re-elected in 2006 and 2010. In 2005, he was chosen to lead the PSDB in the Legislative Assembly, continuously being re-elected to the position until 2010. He also led the block of support for former Minas Gerais Governor Aécio Neves. He then supported the next Governor, Antônio Anastasia.

In 2012, Carneiro ran for Mayor of Uberlândia, but was defeated by Workers' Party candidate Gilmar Machado, who received 68.72% of the vote.

Luiz Humberto Carneiro died of COVID-19 in Uberlândia on 17 April 2021, at the age of 68.
