= Agostinho Patrus =

Brazilian politician (born 1971)

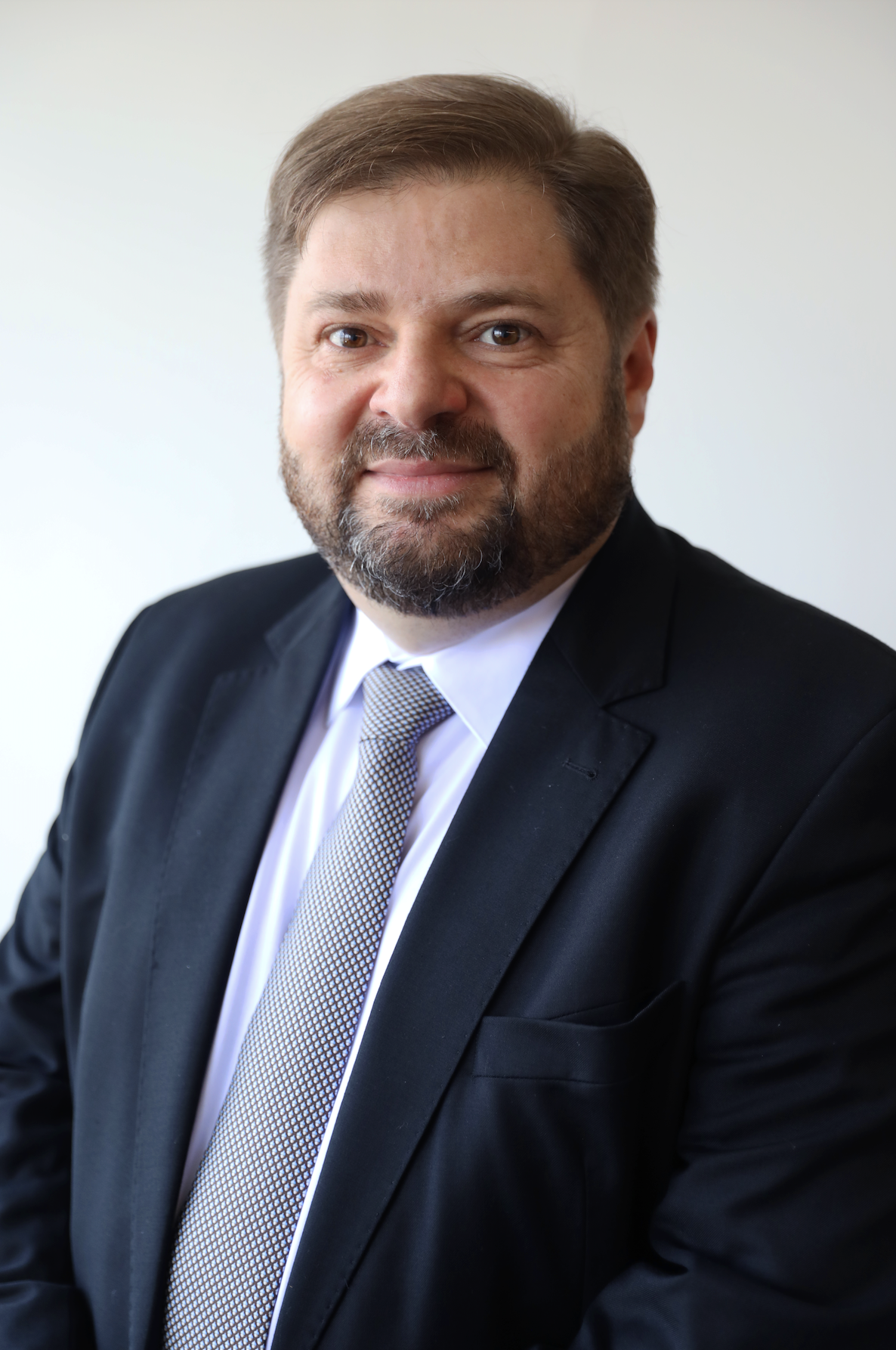
- Patrus in 2025

President of the Legislative Assembly of Minas Gerais
- In office 1 February 2019 – 31 January 2023
- Preceded by: Adalclever Lopes
- Succeeded by: Tadeuzinho

Personal details
- Born: 1 July 1971 (age 55)
- Party: Independent (since 2023)
- Other political affiliations: Social Democratic Party (until 2023)
- Parent: Agostinho Patrus (father)

Agostinho Célio Andrade Patrus (born 1 July 1971) is a Brazilian politician serving as vice president of the Court of Accounts of Minas Gerais since 2025. He was a member of the Legislative Assembly of Minas Gerais from 2007 to 2022, and served as president of the assembly from 2019 to 2022.
