= Sandra Meira Starling =

Brazilian politician (1944–2021)

Member of the Chamber of Deputies of Brazil
- In office 1 February 1991 – 31 January 1999
- Constituency: Minas Gerais

Member of the Legislative Assembly of Minas Gerais
- In office 1 February 1987 – 31 January 1991

Personal details
- Born: 16 January 1944; Belo Horizonte, Brazil
- Died: 14 December 2021 (aged 77); Belo Horizonte, Brazil
- Political party: PT

Sandra Meira Starling (16 January 1944 – 14 December 2021) was a Brazilian politician. A member of the Workers' Party, she served in the Chamber of Deputies from 1991 to 1999 and the Legislative Assembly of Minas Gerais from 1987 to 1991.
