= Eros Biondini =

Brazilian politician (born 1971)

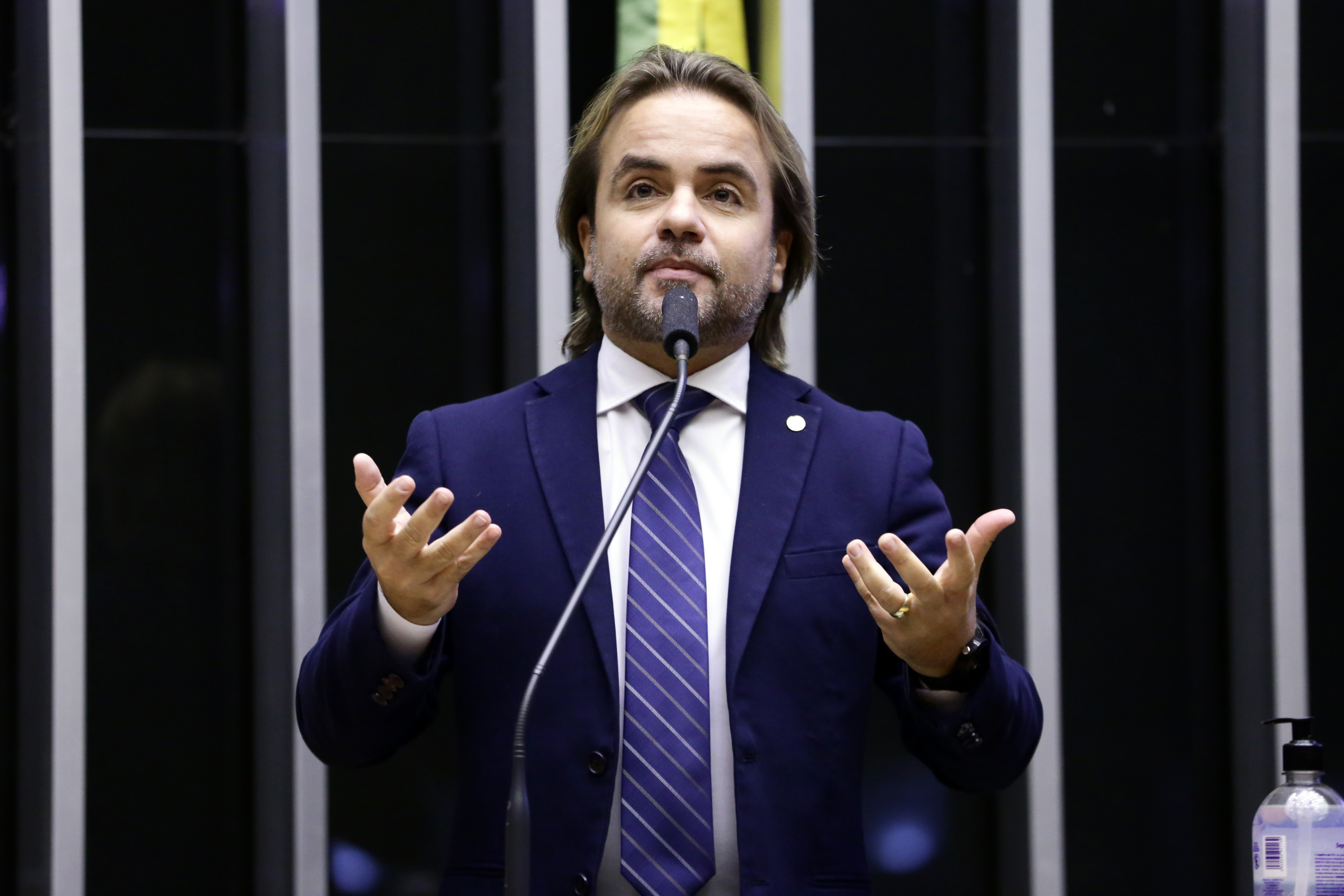

Member of the Chamber of Deputies
- Incumbent
- Assumed office 1 February 2011
- Constituency: Minas Gerais

Legislative Assembly of Minas Gerais
- In office 1 February 2007 – 1 February 2011
- Constituency: At-large

Personal details
- Born: 20 May 1971 (age 55) Belo Horizonte, Minas Gerais, Brazil
- Party: PL (2022–present)
- Other political affiliations: PHS (2001–2009); PTB (2009–2016); PROS (2016–2022)
- Children: 2, including Chiara
- Education: Federal University of Minas Gerais (BVSC)
- Occupation: Politician, musician
- Profession: Veterinarian

Eros Ferreira Biondini (born 20 May 1971) is a veterinarian, Roman Catholic singer, presenter and Brazilian politician.

== Biography ==
Eros Biondini was born in 1971 in Belo Horizonte, Minas Gerais. He holds a bachelor's degree in veterinary medicine from the Federal University of Minas Gerais (UFMG) and a post-graduate lato sensu in the Legislative Branch from the Pontifical Catholic University of Minas Gerais. He is married to Adriana Biondini, with whom he has two children.

Eros is a member of the Catholic Charismatic Renewal. He is the founder of the New World Mission, which is the creator of "Christ is the Show", a major Catholic musical event. New World Mission also produced the program "More Brazil" presented on TV Canção Nova, which enjoyed a three year broadcast run.

== Political career ==
In 2006, Eros Biondini obtained 68.359 thousand votes and became deputy state by the state of Minas Gerais by PHS. In his state mandate he was vice-president of the Committees of Tourism, Industry, Commerce and Cooperativism and of Popular Participation of the Legislative Assembly of Minas Gerais.

In 2010, was elected federal deputy, by the PTB, obtaining 208,058 votes in the litigation. In the year of 2013, Biondini assumed the Secretary of Sports and the Youth of the State of Minas Gerais, during the government of Antônio Anastasia.

In 2014, was reelected Federal Deputy with 179,073 votes.

In the Chamber of Deputies, he was first vice-president of the permanent committees of Work, Administration and Public Service and Consumer Defense. He was also an alternate member of the Social Security and Family Commission. Biondini participated as alternate member of the Special Commission on Political Reform and the Commission on Climate Disasters, head of the CPI on Sexual Exploitation of Children and Adolescents, rapporteur of the Special Subcommittee on Monitoring, Oversight and Control of Telecommunications Services and also coordinated the Mixed Parliamentary Front in Defense of Therapeutic Communities and APACS.

In March 2016, Biondini changed from the PTB to the Republican Party of the Social Order (PROS) assuming the state presidency of the party.

Biondini voted in favor of the Impeachment of Dilma Rousseff. Later, he was favorable to the PEC of the Ceiling of the Public Expenditure. In April 2017 Biondini voted against the labor Reform. In August 2017 he voted in favor of the process in which it was requested to open investigation of the then President Michel Temer. Also in November of the same year, Biondini voted for the approval of PEC 181/15, that makes crime abortion.

In 2018, he was re-elected Federal Deputy with 157,394 votes.

== Discography ==
=== with Banda Nova Aliança ===
- É Tempo (1998)
- Viver Como Irmãos (1999)
- Ao Vivo no Maracanãzinho (2000)

=== Solo career ===
- Tesouros (2002)
- Mundo Novo (2004)
- Minha História (2006)
- Tempo da Graça (2008)
- Felicidade (2010)
- Marcas de Amor (2013)
- Ir Além (2017)
