= Legislative Assembly of Minas Gerais =

Legislative assembly of Minas Gerais, Brazil

Coordinates: 19°55′52″S 43°57′1″W

Legislative Assembly of Minas Gerais Assembleia Legislativa de Minas Gerais
- 20th Legislature
- Minas Gerais coat of arms

Type
- Type: Unicameral

Leadership
- President: Tadeuzinho, MDB since 1 February 2023
- Government Leader: João Magalhães, MDB
- Majority Leader: Roberto Andrade, PSB
- Minority Leader: Cristiano Silveira, PT

Structure
- Seats: 77
- Political groups: Minas em Frente Block (24): PSD (11); PP (6); UNIÃO (3); NOVO (2); MOBILIZA (1); Podemos (1); Democracy and Struggle Block (20): PT (11); PV (5); REDE (2); PCdoB (1); PSOL (1); Avança Minas Block (22): Republicans (4); Avante (3); Cidadania (3); PRD (3); MDB (2); PDT (2); PSB (2); PSDB (2); Solidarity (1); No block (11): PL (11)

Elections
- Voting system: Proportional representation
- Last election: 2 October 2022
- Next election: 4 October 2026

Meeting place
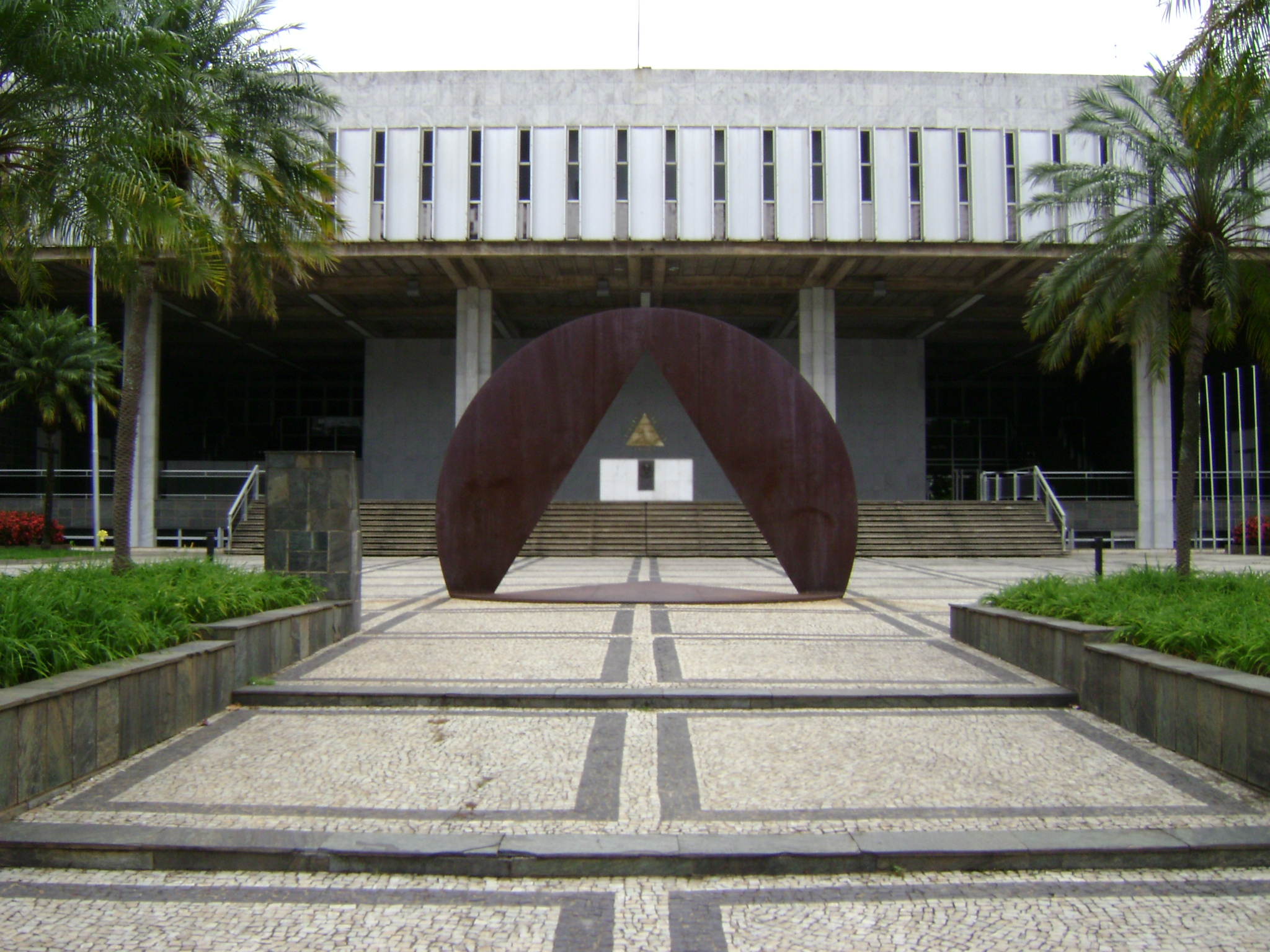
- Palácio da Inconfidência, Belo Horizonte

Website
- www.almg.gov.br

The Legislative Assembly of Minas Gerais (Portuguese: Assembleia Legislativa de Minas Gerais) is the state legislature of Brazil's Minas Gerais state. It consists of 77 state deputies elected by proportional representation and is based in Belo Horizonte, the state capital. The Assembly has been based at the Palácio da Inconfidência since the building's 1972 opening; it was made a national heritage site in 2009.

Deputies elected in the 2018 Brazilian state elections took office in February 2019 as part of the 19th Legislature. Their terms will end in February 2023. Agostinho Patrus of Brazil's Green Party is currently the Assembly president.

== History ==
Brazil's 1824 Constitution, the first since claiming independence from Portugal in 1822, began establishing governmental and legislative powers; Ouro Preto, then the capital of Minas Gerais, was chosen as the province's main administrative hub. It was written to the benefit of wealthy landowners and put native Brazilians, many of them Indigenous or Black, at a disadvantage, particularly because early laws allowed for slavery. An 1834 Amendment allowed its provinces, including Minas Gerais, to establish provincial legislation. At the time of the provincial legislature's establishment, Minas Gerais had more enslaved people than any other province in Brazil.

In 1889, Emperor Pedro II, the final monarch of the Empire of Brazil, was quietly overthrown by the military, who established the First Brazilian Republic, formally known as the United States of Brazil. Wealthy men who had previously owned slaves, as well Minas Gerais and São Paulo, Brazil's largest and richest provinces, headed the coup d'état and the subsequent creation of a republic. Emperor Pedro II was replaced by Marshal Deodoro da Fonseca, the first president of the new oligarchy.

The Empire's constitution was nullified and the Republic's federalist constitution replaced it in 1891. Provinces became states and, due to the decentralization of the government and increased state power, began local elections of their own political representatives and legislative bodies. Minas Gerais' first state constitution was also established in 1891 and was used, with amendments added later, until 1989. The constitution created the bicameral Minas Gerais Congress and consisted of a Chamber of Deputies and a Senate. Oligarchs from São Paulo and Minas Gerais took turns as president of the Republic during this period, as they held a significant amount of power in Brazil.

Following the Revolution of 1930, failed presidential candidate Getúlio Vargas was able to take control of the government and shift the country into the New Republic era. This meant the dissolution of state legislatures and state power in the National Congress declined. The constitution did, however, introduce proportional representation, which still exists in Brazilian politics today. The 1935 Minas Gerais Constitution revived the state's unicameral, 48-person Assembly, albeit with diminished power. In 1937, Vargas seized absolute power and brought the country into Estado Novo, Brazil's first dictatorship. Estado Novo's first constitution was put in place immediately and was inspired by Poland's 1935 authoritarian constitution. This constitution did away with political parties, further decreased state legislative power by making them into "administrative divisions of a unitary state," and ended free elections.

In 1945, Vargas was pushed aside and Brazil returned briefly to a democracy. A democratic constitution was introduced and promised full political freedom, reduction of centralized power, and state rights to elect local political representatives. In 1947, the Constituent Assembly of Minas Gerais was revived, this time with 72 deputies.

The 1964 military coup plunged the country into another dictatorship, this one lasting for more than 20 years. Institutional Acts were introduced and viewed as superior to the constitution. Again, political rights were oppressed, elections were skewed, state autonomy was limited, and political parties were quashed, which created a heavily controlled bipartisan government. In 1967, Minas Gerais' weakened Assembly majoritatively consisted of members of ARENA, one of the two political parties allowed under the Acts. In 1984, civil unrest demanding a return to democracy began cropping up around the country. While dissent from Brazilians continued, José Sarney stepped in as president when his platform partner Tancredo Neves died. Sarney reestablished elections in 1986 to repopulate the National Assembly. A new constitution was passed in 1988 and was the most strongly "democratic Constitution in the history of [the] country." The new constitution restored power to the states, democratic elections, and other freedoms oppressed during the military dictatorship. States could have their own symbols, including flags, and legislative bodies, who could pass state laws. In 1989, the Legislative Assembly was again revived, this time with 77 deputies.

=== Location ===
The Assembly was located in Ouro Preto for the first century or so of its existence in a free Brazil. The Assembly's library was established in 1892 and resided for 5 years in the building now hosting the Federal University of Ouro Preto's pharmacy school. In 1897, as a symbol of progress, the state capital moved from Ouro Preto to Cidade de Minas, now Belo Horizonte. The Assembly moved into a building on Avenida Afonso Pena and its library settled at Praça da República, now known as the Praça Afonso Arinos. They later moved to a building on Rua Tamoios following a 1959 fire before settling in the newly built Palácio da Inconfidência in 1972.

== Organization ==
The Legislative Assembly of Minas Gerais (ALMG) is made up of 77 deputies. The number of members is established "correspond[ing] to triple the representation of the State in the Chamber of Deputies and, when the number 36 is reached, it will be increased by as many Federal Deputies [minus] twelve." Deputies are elected for four-year terms, called legislatures. Each year of the legislature has a single legislative session. The Plenary is the "deliberative body," where state deputies meet to discuss and vote on proposed bills. The plenary is the highest court within the Assembly, with administrative authority over committees, the assembly table, party leaders, and the cabinet. Some plenary events are open discussions with the public.

Examples of Assembly responsibilities include:

- Budget planning and budget guidelines;
- Government debt;
- Development plan;
- Oversight of the effectiveness of Minas Gerais' military policy and the fire brigade;
- Urban planning;
- Creation and/or withdrawal of civil service positions;
- Organization of the state's Public Ministry and State Attorney Office, Public Defender's Office, Court of Auditors, military police, civil police, and other public administration;
- Judicial organization and division
- Acquisition and/or disposal of state property
- Election of the Board of the Assembly;
- Preparation of Internal Regulations;
- Provision of support for the Assembly and its functioning, as well as the police;
- Issuance of a license to sue a state deputy;
- Payment to civil employees;
- Swearing-in of state governor and vice-governor
- Requesting federal intervention;
- Authorization of legal action against and judgement and prosecution of the governor, vice-governor, and/or secretary of state;
- Installment of 5 of 7 councillors on the Court of Auditors;
- Election of 4 members of the governing council;
- Approval of inter-municipal agreements;
- Monitor and control the acts of the Executive Power;
- Authorization of referendums

=== Committees ===
Committees are small groups of deputies working together on a single project or focus; committee foci include public administration, financial and budget inspection, and transportation. Propositions currently under consideration are debated in these sessions. Opinions formed by committee members are powerful; at times, authorities and specialists from the general public are invited to weigh in and offer a different point of view.

The 20th Legislature (2023–2027) has 23 permanent committees:

- Agriculture and Agroindustry
- Constitution and Justice
- Consumer and Taxpayer Defense
- Convention on the Rights of Persons with Disabilities
- Culture
- Defense of Women's Rights
- Economic Development
- Education, Science, and Technology
- Environment and Sustainable Development
- Ethics and Parliamentary Decorum
- Financial and Budgetary Inspection
- Health
- Human Rights
- Mines and Energy
- Municipal Affairs and Regionalisation
- Preventing and Combating the Use of Crack and Other Drugs
- Public Administration
- Public Participation
- Public Security
- Redaction
- Sport, Leisure, and Youth
- Transport, Communication, and Public Works
- Work, Pension, and Social Assistance

== Current legislature ==
=== Board of the Assembly ===
The Board of the Assembly is made up of the following politicians for the 2025–2027 term:

Office	Name	Party	Years
President	Tadeu "Tadeuzinho" Leite	Brazilian Democratic Movement	2023–present
1st VP	Marilene "Leninha" Alves	Workers' Party	
2nd VP	Nacib Duarte Bechir	Social Democratic Party	
3rd VP	Betinho Pinto Coelho	Green Party	
1st Secretary	Gustavo Santana	Liberal Party	
2nd Secretary	Alencar da Silveira Júnior	Democratic Labour Party	2023–2025
3rd Secretary	João Vítor Xavier	Cidadania	

=== Blocks ===
Each political party that has at least five deputies forms a group called a bench. A block is a group made up of at least 16 deputies. Blocks must be in place for legislative work to begin. Benches and blocks both have a leader and vice-leader, though party representatives with less than 5 members cannot be either. Parties with large numbers of members can form a block but the limit is one per party.

As of February 2025, the Assembly has three official blocks:

- Minas em Frente; Government block - 6 parties, 24 deputies
  - Social Democratic Party (10) (Note: In September 2025, Gustavo Valadares left PMN and joined PSD.), Progressistas (6), Brazil Union (3), New Party (2), National Mobilization (2), Podemos (1)
- Avança Minas; Government block - 9 parties, 22 deputies
  - Republicans (4), Avante (3), Cidadania (3), Democratic Renewal Party (3), Brazilian Democratic Movement (2), Democratic Labour Party (2) (Note: Alencar da Silveira Jr. resigned in December 2025 and was replaced by Carlos Pimenta), Brazilian Socialist Party (2), Brazilian Social Democracy Party (2), Solidarity (1)
- Democracia e Luta; Opposition block - 5 parties, 20 deputies
  - Workers' Party (11), Green Party (5), Sustainability Network (2)Communist Party of Brazil (1), Socialism and Liberty Party (1)

== Notable members ==
- Rondon Pacheco (1919–2016), 1947–1951
- Aécio Ferreira da Cunha (1927–2010), 1954–1987
- Aureliano Chaves (1929–2003), 1959–1985
- Bonifácio José Tamm de Andrada (1930–2021), 1959–1965, 1966–1975, 1979–2019
- Hélio Garcia (1931–2016), 1963–1967
- Sandra Meira Starling (1944–2021), 1987–1991
- Nilmário Miranda (1947– ), 1991–2018
- Ivair Nogueira do Pinho (1951–2021), 1995–1999, 2001–2019
- Pedro Ivo Ferreira Caminhas (1952–2021), 2001–2011
- Luiz Humberto Carneiro (1953–2021), 2003–2021
- João Leite da Silva Neto (1955– ), 1995–present
- Zezé Perrella (1956– ), 2007–2010
- Eros Biondini (1971– ), 2007–2011
- George Hilton (1971– ), 1999–2007
- Leonardo Fernandes Moreira (1974–2020), 2003–2011
- Áurea Carolina (1983– ), 2018–
