= Betim =

- Municipality
- Municipality of Betim
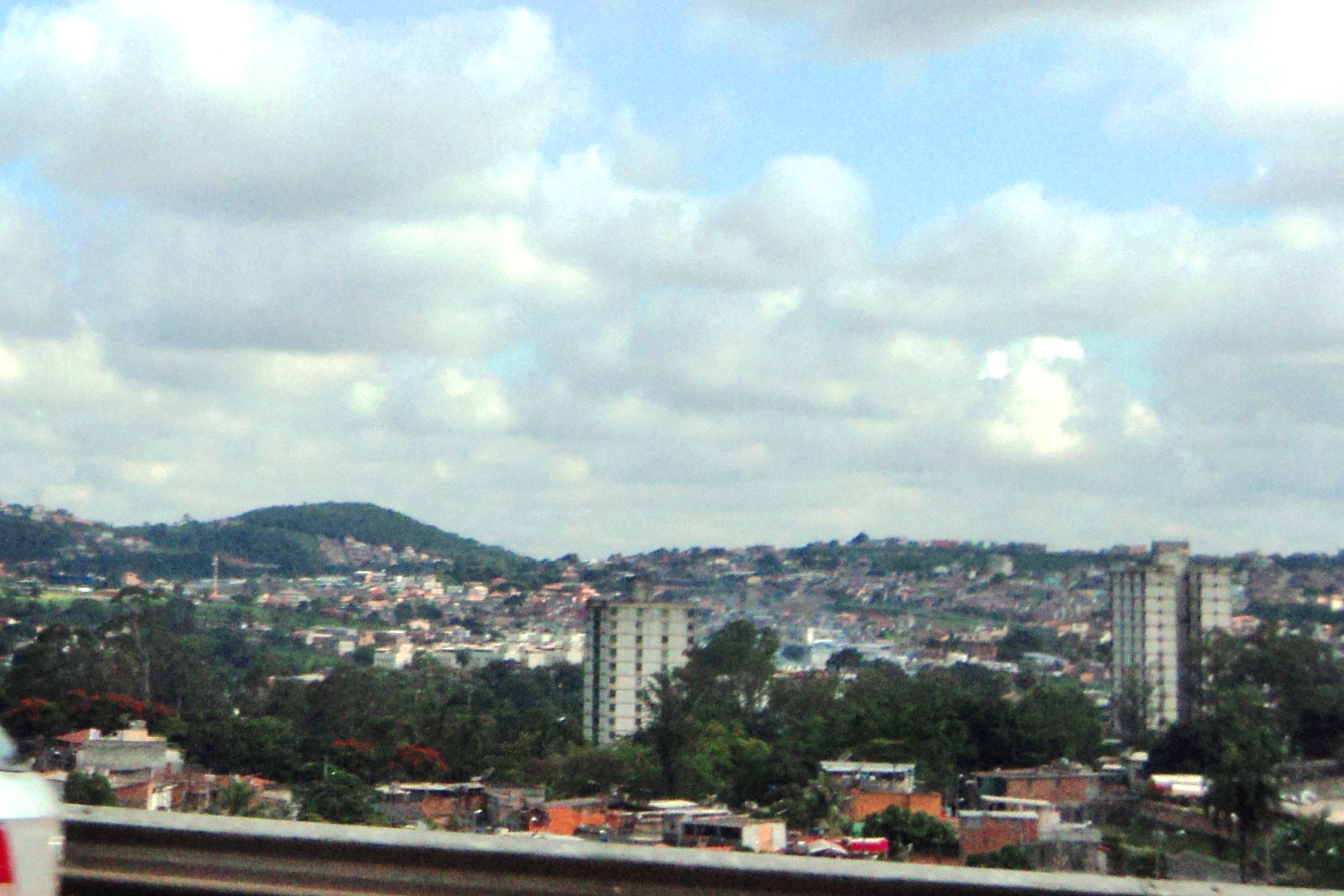
- Partial view of Betim

- Flag Coat of arms

- Location in Minas Gerais
- Coordinates: 19°58′04″S 44°11′52″W
- Country: Brazil
- Region: Southeast
- State: Minas Gerais
- Founded: December 17, 1938

Government
  - Mayor: Vittorio Medioli (PHS)

Area
  - Total: 342.85 km^{2} (132.38 sq mi)
- Elevation: 830 m (2,720 ft)

Population (2022)
  - Total: 411,846
  - Estimate (2025): 431,433
  - Density: 1,176.6/km^{2} (3,047/sq mi)
- Demonym: Betinense
- Time zone: UTC−3 (BRT)
- Postal Code: 32500-000
- Area code: (+55) 31
- HDI (2010): 0.749 – high
- Website: betim.mg.gov.br

Betim is a city in Minas Gerais, Brazil. The city belongs to the mesoregion Metropolitan of Belo Horizonte (BH) and to the microregion of Belo Horizonte. It is the fifth largest city in Minas Gerais and one of the 50 largest cities in the Southeast of Brazil.

Betim is home to several Petrobras oil refineries, as well as Fiat's largest factory, which opened in 1976. The city has an important role not only in the state's economy, but in the whole country's as well.

== Geography ==
Betim is located on the southwest of Belo Horizonte IGR, with Rio Paraopeba flowing through its south. Its average elevation is 830 meters above the sea level.

=== Climate ===
Betim has Humid Subtropical Climate (Cwa). It sees the most rainfall in December, with 268.5 mm of average precipitation; and the least rainfall in July, with 5.5 mm of average precipitation.

Climate data for Betim
Month	Jan	Feb	Mar	Apr	May	Jun	Jul	Aug	Sep	Oct	Nov	Dec	Year
Mean daily maximum °C (°F)	29 (84)	30 (86)	29 (84)	28 (82)	26 (79)	25 (77)	26 (79)	27 (81)	28 (82)	29 (84)	28 (82)	28 (82)	28 (82)
Daily mean °C (°F)	24 (75)	25 (77)	24 (75)	23 (73)	21 (70)	19 (66)	19 (66)	20 (68)	22 (72)	23 (73)	23 (73)	23 (73)	22 (72)
Mean daily minimum °C (°F)	20 (68)	20 (68)	20 (68)	18 (64)	16 (61)	14 (57)	13 (55)	15 (59)	17 (63)	19 (66)	19 (66)	20 (68)	18 (64)
Average rainfall mm (inches)	231.8 (9.13)	149.8 (5.90)	125.6 (4.94)	46.3 (1.82)	19.6 (0.77)	11.4 (0.45)	5.5 (0.22)	10.5 (0.41)	36.5 (1.44)	85.8 (3.38)	176.4 (6.94)	268.5 (10.57)	1,167.7 (45.97)
Average rainy days (≥ 1 mm)	18.8	13.3	13.8	6.3	3.4	1.8	1.0	1.9	5.3	10.6	17.1	21.2	114.5
Mean daily daylight hours	13.2	12.7	12.2	11.6	11.2	10.9	11.1	11.5	12.0	12.6	13.1	13.3	12.1
Source: Weatherspark.com

== Notable people ==
- Jonathas de Jesus, professional footballer.

== See also ==
- List of municipalities in Minas Gerais
- Ramacrisna
