= 2024 Belo Horizonte mayoral election =

- 6 October 2024 (first round); 27 October 2024 (second round)
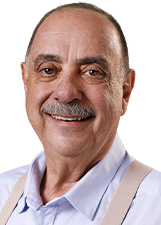

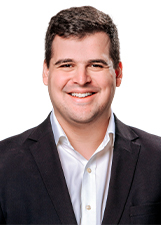
Nominee	Fuad Noman	Bruno Engler
Party	PSD	PL
Alliance	Courage to Change	BH Always Forward
Running mate	Álvaro Damião	Coronel Claudia
Popular vote	670,574	577,537
Percentage	53.73%	46.27%
- Winner by electoral zone Noman(18)
Mayor before election
Fuad Noman
PSD
Elected mayor
Fuad Noman
PSD
- Municipal Chamber election
Party	Leader	Vote %	Seats	+/–
Municipal Chamber
PL	Pablo Almeida	13.02%	6	+5
FE Brasil	Pedro Rousseff	11.07%	6	+4
PSD	Helinho da Farmácia	7.61%	3	−3
PODE	Lucas Ganem	6.66%	3	+1
PSOL-REDE	Iza Lourença	6.20%	3	+1
PP	Professora Marli	6.09%	2	−1
Republicanos	Osvaldo Lopes	5.85%	3	+2
NOVO	Fernanda Pereira Altoé	5.74%	3	0
PRD	Wanderley Porto	4.78%	2	−1
Solidarity	Rudson Paixão	4.25%	2	+2
MDB	Loíde Gonçalves	3.65%	2	+2
DC	Flávia Borja	3.60%	1	+1
UNIÃO	Janaina Cardoso	3.50%	1	−1
PSDB-Cidadania	L. Ângelo da Itatiaia	3.17%	1	−2
PDT	Bruno Miranda	2.91%	1	−2
Avante	Juninho Los Hermanos	2.87%	1	−2
MOBILIZA	Neném Da Farmácia	2.71%	1	0
This lists parties that won seats. See the complete results below.

The 2024 Belo Horizonte municipal election took place in the city of Belo Horizonte, Brazil on 6 October 2024. Voters elected 41 councillors. A second round was held on October 27 as no candidate achieved 50% in the first round for mayor.

The incumbent mayor is Fuad Noman of the Social Democratic Party. Noman became mayor after the resignation of Alexandre Kalil to unsuccessfully run for governor of Minas Gerais in the 2022 Minas Gerais gubernatorial election.

State Deputy Bruno Engler of the Liberal Party, who achieved second place in 2020, and Noman advanced to a second round, defeating Mauro Tramonte of the Republicanos, the candidate of governor Romeu Zema.

Though Zema supported Engler in the second round, Noman was reelected in the second round, defeating Engler by a little less than 100,000 votes.

== Electoral calendar ==
Electoral calendar announced by the Superior Electoral Court (TSE) on 3 January 2024
7 March – 5 April	Period of the 'party window' for councillors. During this period, the councillors are able to move to other political parties in order to run for election while not losing their respective political terms.
6 April	Deadline for all parties and party federations to obtain the registration of their statutes at the Superior Electoral Court and for all candidates to have their electoral domicile in the constituency in which they wish to contest the elections with the affiliation granted by the party.
15 May	Start of the preliminary fundraising campaign in the form of collective financing for potential candidates. During this period, candidates are not allowed to ask for votes and are still subjected to obey the rules regarding electoral propaganda on the Internet.
20 July – 5 August	On this date, party conventions begin to deliberate on coalitions and choose candidates for mayors and councillors tickets. Parties have until 15 August to register their names with the Brazilian Election Justice.
16 August	Beginning of electoral campaigns on an equal basis, with any advertising or demonstration explicitly requesting for votes before the date being considered irregular and subject to fines.
30 August –3 October	Broadcasting of free electoral propaganda on radio and television.
6 October	Date of mayoral elections.
27 October	Date of a possible second round in cities with more than 200,000 voters in which the most voted candidate for mayor has not reached 50% of the valid votes.

== Results ==
=== First round ===
Popular vote (first round)
Bruno	34.38%
Fuad	26.54%
Tramonte	15.22%
Gabriel	10.55%
Duda	7.68%
Rogério	4.37%
Others	1.26%

=== Full results ===
Candidate	Running mate	Party	First round		Second round	
Candidate	Running mate	Party	Votes	%	Votes	%
Fuad Noman (incumbent)	Álvaro Damião (UNIÃO)	PSD	336,442	26.54	670,574	53.73
Bruno Engler	Coronel Claudia	PL	435,853	34.38	577,537	46.27
Mauro Tramonte	Luísa Barreto (NOVO)	Republicanos	192,991	15.22		
Gabriel Azevedo	Paulo Brant (PSB)	MDB	133,728	10.55		
Duda Salabert	Professor Francisco Forreaux	PDT	97,315	7.68		
Rogério Correia	Bella Gonçalves (PSOL)	PT	55,393	4.37		
Carlos Viana	Renata Rosa	PODE	12,712	1.00		
Indira Xavier	Geraldo Neres	UP	2,462	0.19		
Wanderson Rocha	Andréa Ferreira	PSTU	667	0.05		
Lourdes Francisco	Marília Garcia	PCO	231	0.02		
Total			1,267,794	100.00	1,248,111	100.00
Valid votes			1,267,794	90.28	1,248,111	92.03
Invalid votes			70,263	5.00	61,885	4.56
Blank votes			66,228	4.72	46,236	3.41
Total votes			1,404,285	100.00	1,356,232	100.00
Registered voters/turnout			1,993,024	70.46	1,993,024	68.05
