= 2020 Belo Horizonte mayoral election =

2020 Belo Horizonte municipal election
- 15 November 2020
- Mayoral election
- Opinion polls
- Turnout: 88.88%
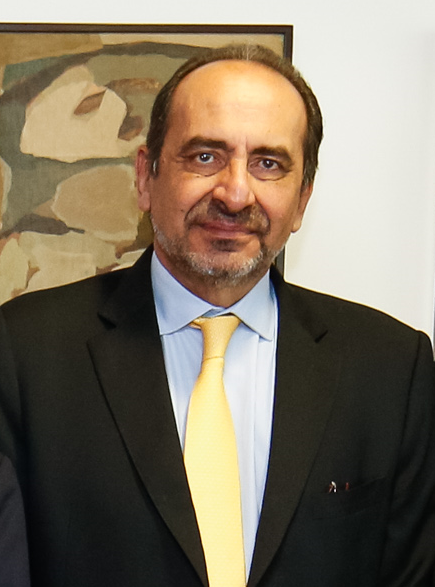

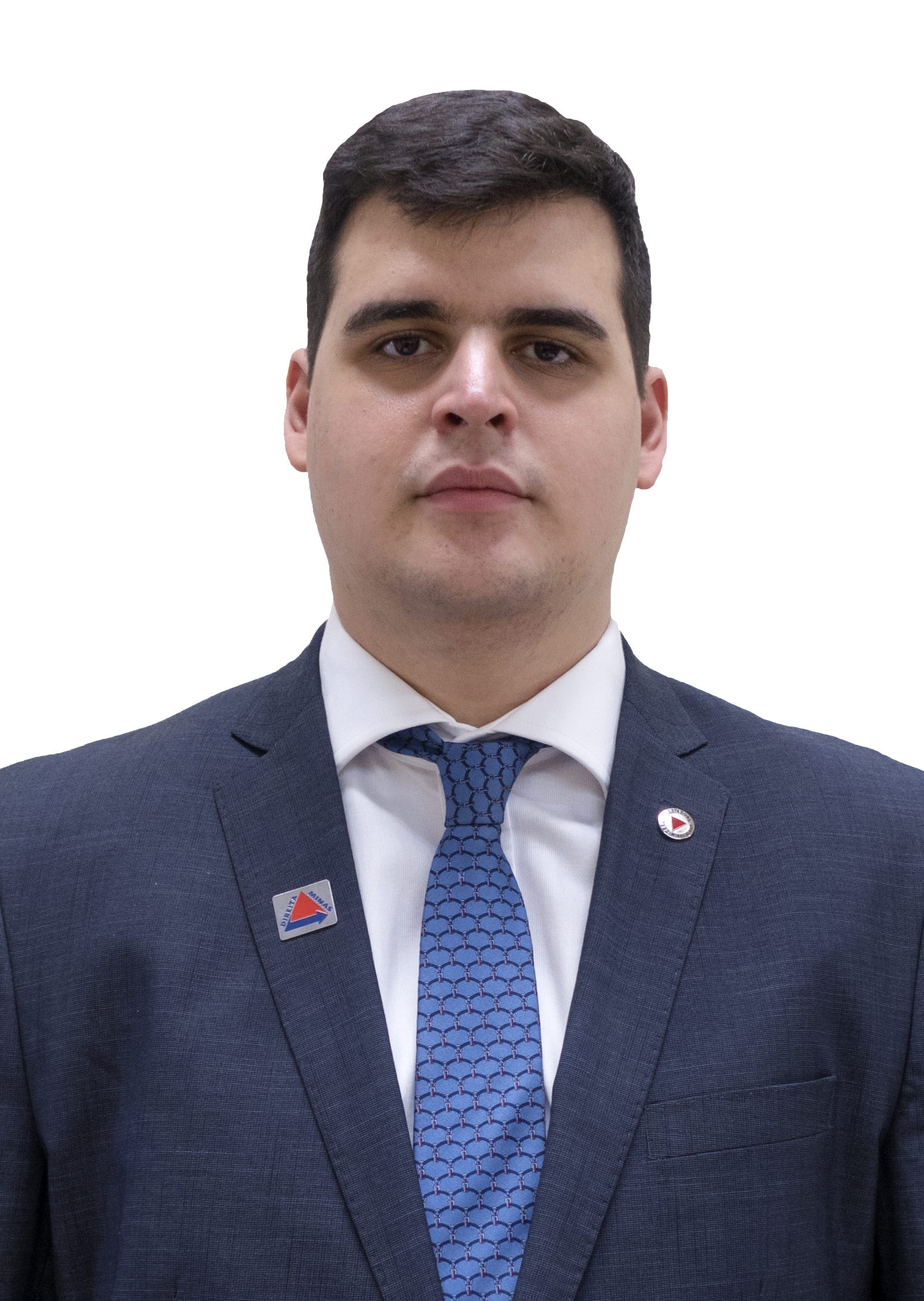
Candidate	Alexandre Kalil	Bruno Engler
Party	PSD	PRTB
Running mate	Fuad Noman	Mauro Quintão
Popular vote	784,307	123,215
Percentage	63.36%	9.95%
- Alexandre Kalil
Mayor before election
Alexandre Kalil
PSD
Elected mayor
Alexandre Kalil
PSD
- Parliamentary election
Party	Leader	Vote %	Seats	+/–
Municipal Chamber
PSD	Autair Gomes	11.46	6	+4
PP	None	6.68	4	+3
PDT	None	6.38	3	+1
NOVO	Bernardo Ramos	5.18	3	+2
REDE	None	4.41	1	+1
Patriota	Gabriel Marques	3.83	2	+2
PRTB	None	3.61	1	+1
Cidadania	Marilda Portela	3.51	2	+1
PODE	Nely Aquinos	2.87	1	−3
PMN	None	2.82	1	−2
MDB	Reinaldo Gomes	1.86	1	−1
PSDB	Henrique Braga	1.83	1	−2
PSB	Edmar Branco	1.64	0	−3
DC	None	1.58	0	−1
PCdoB	Gilson Reis	1.47	0	−1
DEMOCRATA	None	0.55	0	−1
This lists parties that won seats. See the complete results below.

The 2020 Belo Horizonte municipal election took place in the city of Belo Horizonte, Brazil, taking place on 15 November 2020 in a single round. Voters voted to elect the Mayor, the Vice Mayor and 41 city councillors for the administration of the city. The result was a single round victory for incumbent mayor Alexandre Kalil of the Social Democratic Party (PSD), winning 784,307 votes and a share of 63.36% of the popular, defeating state deputy Bruno Engler of the Brazilian Labour Renewal Party (PRTB), who took 123,215 votes and a share of 9.95% of the popular vote.

Originally, the elections would occur on 4 October (first round) and 25 October (second round, if necessary). However, with the growing of cases and deaths caused by the COVID-19 pandemic in Brazil, the dates were delayed.

== Political context and pandemic ==
The 2020 municipal elections were directly affected by the COVID-19 pandemic, forcing the parties to remodel their campaign strategies. The Superior Electoral Court authorized the parties to do digital conventions, in order to avoid crowds. Some parties launched their pre-candidacies through digital media. Besides that, from this election, the Constitutional Amendment 97/2017 took force, prohibiting party coalitions in legislative elections (federal, state or municipal).

== Candidates ==
Party	Candidate	Most recent political office or occupation	Party	Running mate	Most recent political office or occupation	Coalition	Electoral number
Republicans	Lafayette de Andrada	State Deputy from Minas Gerais (since 2019)	Republicans	Marlei Rodrigues	No prior political office	n/a	10
Workers' Party (PT)	Nilmário Miranda	Secretary of Human Rights (2003–2005)	Workers' Party (PT)	Luana de Souza	No prior political office	n/a	13
United Socialist Workers' Party (PSTU)	Wanderson Rocha	No prior political office	United Socialist Workers' Party (PSTU)	Firminia Rodrigues	No prior political office	n/a	16
Cidadania	João Vítor Xavier	State Deputy from Minas Gerais (since 2011)	Democrats (DEM)	Leonardo Bortoletto	No prior political office	True BH; Cidadania, DEM, PSB, PL, PMN, PSL, PODE, PSC, PTB	23
Brazilian Labour Renewal Party (PRTB)	Bruno Engler	State Deputy of Minas Gerais (since 2019)	Brazilian Labour Renewal Party (PRTB)	Mauro Quintão (Note: Quintão replaced Colonel Cláudia Romualdo (PRTB) after her candidacy for Vice Mayor was rejected by the Regional Electoral Court.)	No prior political office	n/a	28
Workers' Cause Party (PCO)	Marilia Domingues	No prior political office	Workers' Cause Party (PCO)	Silvanio Vilaça	No prior political office	n/a	29
New Party (NOVO)	Rodrigo Paiva	No prior political office	New Party (NOVO)	Patrícia Albergaria	No prior political office	n/a	30
Brazilian Woman's Party (PMB)	Edmar Xavier	No prior political office	Brazilian Woman's Party (PMB)	Paula Maia	No prior political office	n/a	35
Brazilian Social Democracy Party (PSDB)	Luisa Barreto	No prior political office	Brazilian Social Democracy Party (PSDB)	Juvenal Araújo	Acting Minister of Human Rights (2018)	n/a	45
Socialism and Liberty Party (PSOL)	Áurea Carolina	Federal Deputy from Minas Gerais (since 2019)	Popular Unity (UP)	Leonardo Péricles	No prior political office	Left-wing Front BH in Movement; PSOL, UP, PCB	50
Patriota	Marcelo Souza e Silva	No prior political office	Patriota	Leandro Moreira	No prior political office	n/a	51
Social Democratic Party (PSD)	Alexandre Kalil	Mayor of Belo Horizonte (2017–2022)	Social Democratic Party (PSD)	Fuad Noman	Secretary of Finances (2017–2020)	Courage and Labour; PSD, MDB, PV, REDE, Avante, PDT, DC, PP	55
Communist Party of Brazil (PCdoB)	Wadson Ribeiro	Federal Deputy from Minas Gerais (2011–2019)	Communist Party of Brazil (PCdoB)	Kátia Vergilio	No prior political office	n/a	65
Solidariedade	Wendel de Mesquita	State Deputy of Minas Gerais (since 2019)	Solidariedade	Sandra Bini	No prior political office	n/a	77
Republican Party of the Social Order (PROS)	Fabiano Cazeca	No prior political office	Christian Labour Party (PTC)	Paula Gomes	No prior political office	The Competence BH Needs; PROS, PTC	90

== Opinion polls ==
=== Published after the campaign's start ===
Pollster/client(s)	Date(s) conducted	Sample size	Kalil PSD	Xavier Cidadania	Carolina PSOL	Paiva NOVO	Engler PRTB	Others	Abst. Undec.	Lead
2020 election	15 Nov	1,237,764	63.36%	9.22%	8.33%	3.63%	9.95%	9.12%	11.12%	53.41%
Datafolha	10–11 Nov	1,036	63%	8%	5%	2%	4%	6%	14%	55%
Datafolha	10–11 Nov	1,036	55%	8%	5%	1%	3%	6%	25%	50%
Ibope	7–9 Nov	1,001	59%	7%	3%	1%	1%	5%	22%	52%
Datafolha	3–4 Nov	868	65%	7%	6%	1%	4%	8%	14%	58%
Datafolha	3–4 Nov	868	57%	4%	3%	–	2%	5%	29%	53%
Ibope	26–29 Oct	1,001	63%	8%	5%	1%	3%	6%	22%	55%
Datatempo/CP2	26–29 Oct	1,500	63.6%	5.5%	3.0%	1.4%	3.4%	7.0%	16.1%	58.1%
Datatempo/CP2	26–29 Oct	1,500	58.9%	2.7%	1.9%	0.7%	1.9%	3.3%	30.6%	56.2%
Paraná Pesquisas	20–23 Oct	802	59.5%	8.0%	4.6%	2.0%	3.9%	4.9%	16.9%	50.9%
Datafolha	20–21 Oct	868	60%	7%	5%	1%	3%	8%	14%	53%
Datafolha	20–21 Oct	868	49%	3%	3%	–	2%	5%	37%	46%
RealTime BigData	14–17 Oct	1,050	56%	7%	6%	4%	4%	4%	19%	49%
RealTime BigData	14–17 Oct	1,050	47%	2%	2%	2%	1%	1%	45%	45%
Ibope	13–15 Oct	1,001	59%	7%	3%	1%	1%	5%	22%	52%
Datatempo/CP2	12–14 Oct	800	64.8%	4.4%	3.3%	1.2%	1.7%	5.5%	19.4%	60.4%
Datatempo/CP2	12–14 Oct	800	58.4%	1.5%	1.9%	0.5%	1.0%	2.8%	35.2%	56.5%
Datafolha	5–6 Oct	800	56%	6%	3%	2%	3%	9%	20%	50%
Datafolha	5–6 Oct	800	37%	1%	2%	1%	1%	5%	53%	35%
Ibope	30 Sep–2 Oct	805	58%	4%	3%	2%	3%	8%	23%	54%
Ibope	30 Sep–2 Oct	805	43%	1%	2%	–	2%	5%	47%	41%

=== Published before the campaign's start ===
Pollster/client(s)	Date(s) conducted	Sample size	Kalil PSD	Xavier Cidadania	Carolina PSOL	Paiva NOVO	Engler PRTB	Others	Abst. Undec.	Lead
Paraná Pesquisas	25–29 Sep	820	56.5%	6.6%	4.5%	3.0%	2.4%	9.4%	18.1%	49.9%
Paraná Pesquisas	22–25 Jul	820	55.9%	6.5%	4.1%	3.0%	2.1%	7.0%	21.2%	49.4%
Paraná Pesquisas	22–25 Jul	820	56.5%	6.7%	4.4%	3.7%	2.1%	10.6%	21.7%	49.8%

== Results ==
=== Mayor ===
Candidate	Running mate	Party	Votes	%
Alexandre Kalil (incumbent)	Fuad Noman	PSD	784,307	63.36
Bruno Engler	Mauro Quintão	PRTB	123,215	9.95
João Vítor Xavier	Leonardo Bortoletto (DEM)	Cidadania	114,130	9.22
Áurea Carolina	Leonardo Péricles (UP)	PSOL	103,115	8.33
Rodrigo Paiva	Patricia Albergaria	NOVO	44,977	3.63
Nilmário Miranda	Luana de Souza	PT	23,331	1.88
Luisa Barreto	Juvenal Araújo	PSDB	17,161	1.39
Wendel Mesquita	Sandra Bini	Solidariedade	9,266	0.75
Lafayette de Andrada	Marlei Rodrigues	Republicanos	7,327	0.59
Marcelo Souza e Silva	Leandro Moreira	Patriota	4,105	0.33
Fabiano Cazeca	Paula Gomes (PTC)	PROS	2,517	0.20
Wadson Ribeiro	Kátia Vergilio	PCdoB	2,211	0.18
Wanderson Rocha	Firminia Rodrigues	PSTU	907	0.07
Edmar Xavier	Paula Maia	PMB	865	0.07
Marilia Rodrigues	Adilson Rosa	PCO	330	0.03
Total			1,237,764	100.00
Valid votes			1,237,764	88.88
Invalid votes			95,575	6.86
Blank votes			59,212	4.25
Total votes			1,392,551	100.00
Registered voters/turnout			1,943,184	71.66
Source: G1

Popular vote
Kalil	63.36%
Engler	9.95%
Xavier	9.22%
Carolina	8.33%
Others	9.12%

=== Municipal Chamber ===
Party	Votes	%	Seats	+/–
Social Democratic Party	133,874	11.54	6	▲4
Progressistas	78,012	6.72	4	▲3
Democratic Labour Party	74,554	6.43	3	▲3
Avante	61,674	5.32	3	▲1
New Party	60,575	5.22	3	▲2
Socialism and Liberty Party	51,814	4.47	2	Steady
Sustainability Network	51,519	4.44	1	▲1
Solidariedade	46,958	4.05	0	Steady
Workers' Party	46,220	3.98	2	Steady
Patriota	44,728	3.86	2	▲2
Brazilian Labour Renewal Party	42,202	3.64	1	▲1
Cidadania	41,006	3.53	2	▼2
Republican Party of the Social Order	38,569	3.32	1	Steady
Democrats	38,440	3.31	1	Steady
Christian Labour Party	34,768	3.00	1	Steady
Brazilian Labour Party	33,931	2.92	1	Steady
Podemos	33,523	2.89	1	▼7
Party of National Mobilization	32,925	2.84	1	▼2
Social Liberal Party	25,832	2.23	1	Steady
Social Christian Party	25,305	2.18	1	Steady
Liberal Party	22,424	1.93	1	Steady
Brazilian Democratic Movement	21,724	1.87	1	▲1
Brazilian Social Democracy Party	21,404	1.84	1	▲1
Republicanos	20,642	1.78	1	▼1
Brazilian Socialist Party	19,108	1.65	0	▼3
Christian Democracy	18,467	1.59	0	Steady
Communist Party of Brazil	17,138	1.48	0	▼1
Green Party	14,289	1.23	0	Steady
Popular Unity	5,203	0.45	0	New
United Socialist Workers' Party	1,675	0.14	0	Steady
Brazilian Communist Party	1,449	0.12	0	Steady
Workers' Cause Party	193	0.02	0	Steady
Total	1,160,145	100.00	41	–
Valid votes	1,160,145	83.82		
Invalid votes	113,306	8.19		
Blank votes	110,705	8.00		
Total votes	1,384,156	100.00		
Registered voters/turnout	1,943,184	71.23		
Source: G1
