= 2024 Brazilian municipal elections =

Local elections in Brazil

- 6 October 2024 (first round); 27 October 2024 (second round)

5,570 mayors; 56,810 councillors
	First party	Second party	Third party
Leader	Gilberto Kassab	Baleia Rossi	Valdemar Costa Neto
Party	PSD	MDB	PL
Popular vote	14,337,811	14,282,599	15,597,429
Councillors	6,622	8,109	4,957
Councillors +/–	▲922	▲757	▲1,494
Mayors	891	863	518
Mayors +/–	▲225	▲63	▲168
	Fourth party	Fifth party	Sixth party
Leader	Antônio Rueda	Ciro Nogueira	Gleisi Hoffmann
Party	UNIÃO	PP	PT
Popular vote	10,740,310	9,843,584	8,707,811
Councillors	5,482	6,942	3,127
Councillors +/–	▼65	▲571	▲460
Mayors	591	752	252
Mayors +/–	▲25	▲58	▲66
- Results by municipality

Municipal elections took place in Brazil on 6 October 2024, with any runoffs scheduled for 27 October.

== Schedule ==
Voters will choose mayors, vice mayors, and city councillors of 5,570 municipalities in the country. Party conventions to nominate candidates should take place from 20 July to 5 August.

On 16 August, the electoral campaign starts. Free advertisements on radio and television begin on 30 August. According to current electoral law, the two-round system - if the most voted candidate doesn't get 50% +1 of valid votes –is only available in cities with more than 200,000 voters.

In 2024, nearly 154 million people were eligible to vote –of which 20 million were not required to, according to the Superior Electoral Court, which represented a 5.4% increase from the previous municipal elections in 2020.

70-year-old or older people, who were not required to vote, accounted for 15,000,000 voters, that is, 10% of total voters, the highest such figure in 16 years in Brazil.

== Results ==
=== National results ===
Party or alliance		Votes	%	Seats			
Party or alliance		Votes	%	Mayors	+/-	Councillors	+/-
Liberal Party		15,597,429	13.95	518	▲168 (Note: 6 were elected in the second round.)	4957	▲1494
Social Democratic Party		14,337,811	12.83	891	▲225 (Note: 9 were elected in the second round.)	6622	▲922
Brazilian Democratic Movement		14,282,599	12.78	863	▲63 (Note: 7 were elected in the second round.)	8109	▲757
Brazil Union		10,740,310	9.61	591	▲25 (Note: 6 were elected in the second round.)	5482	▼65
Progressives		9,843,584	8.81	752	▲58	6942	▲571
Brazil of Hope	Workers' Party	8,707,811	7.79	252	▲66 (Note: 4 were elected in the second round.)	3127	▲460
Brazil of Hope	Green Party	545,196	0.49	14	▼32	488	▼323
Brazil of Hope	Communist Party of Brazil	274,122	0.25	19	▼27	354	▼350
Republicans		7,251,862	6.49	440	▲224 (Note: 3 were elected in the second round. On October 8, 2024, the votes cast for the candidate Professor Joziel (DC) in the election for mayor of São João de Meriti were annulled. Thus, the candidate Léo Vieira (Republicans) was considered elected in the first round.)	4642	▲2068
Brazilian Socialist Party		6,464,174	5.78	312	▲59	3583	▲573
Always Forward	Brazilian Social Democracy Party	4,607,809	4.12	276	▼250 (Note: 3 were elected in the second round.)	3002	▼1397
Always Forward	Cidadania	1,096,357	0.98	33	▼108	437	▼1145
Podemos		3,425,068	3.06	129	▼95 (Note: 5 were elected in the second round.)	2329	▼701
Democratic Labour Party		3,113,471	2.79	151	▼166 (Note: 2 were elected in the second round.)	2503	▼927
PSOL REDE Federation	Socialism and Liberty Party	2,578,411	2.31	0	▼5	80	▼13
PSOL REDE Federation	Sustainability Network	129,569	0.12	4	▼1	172	▲23
Avante		2,115,774	1.89	136	▲54 (Note: One mayor, David Almeida in Manaus, was elected in the second round for Avante.)	1525	▲483
Brazilian Labour Renewal Party		1,818,984	1.63	1	▼5	97	▼197
New Party		1,548,657	1.39	19	▲18 (Note: One mayor, Sérgio Victor in Taubaté, was elected in the second round for NOVO.)	263	▲234
Solidariedade		1,249,448	1.12	63	▼62	1251	▼862
Democratic Renewal Party		1,058,160	0.95	77	▼189	1413	▼914
Brazilian Woman's Party		415,799	0.37	2	▲1	109	▲63
National Mobilization		255,192	0.23	21	▲8	360	▲161
Act		110,680	0.10	3	▲2	296	▲82
Christian Democracy		107,093	0.10	2	▲1	253	▲131
Popular Unity		56,330	0.05	0	Steady	0	Steady
United Socialist Workers' Party		30,198	0.03	0	Steady	0	Steady
Workers' Cause Party		9,364	0.01	0	Steady	0	Steady
Brazilian Communist Party		3,813	0.00	0	Steady	0	▼
Total		111,775,075	100.00	5569	–	58396	–
Valid votes		111,775,075	91.06				
Invalid votes		7,054,302	5.75				
Blank votes		3,915,103	3.19				
Total votes		122,744,480	100.00				
Registered voters/turnout		147,918,483	82.98				

=== Results in capitals ===
Capital	State	Mayor	Party	Vice Mayor	Party	2nd Place	Party
Aracaju	SE	Emília Corrêa	PL	Ricardo Marques	CID	Luiz Roberto	PDT
Belém	PA	Igor Normando	MDB	Cássio Andrade	PSB	Éder Mauro	PL
Belo Horizonte	MG	Fuad Noman	PSD	Álvaro Damião	UNIÃO	Bruno Engler	PL
Boa Vista	RO	Arthur Henrique	MDB	Ten. Cel. Zeitoune	PL	Catarina Guerra	UNIÃO
Campo Grande	MS	Adriane Lopes	PP	Dra. Camilla	AVANTE	Rose Modesto	UNIÃO
Cuiabá	MT	Abilio Brunini	PL	Coronel Vânia	NOVO	Lúdio Cabral	PT
Curitiba	PR	Eduardo Pimentel	PSD	Paulo Martins	PL	Cristina Graeml	PMB
Florianópolis	SC	Topázio Neto	PSD	Maryanne Mattos	PL	Marquito	PSOL
Fortaleza	CE	Evandro Leitão	PT	Gabriella Aguiar	PSD	André Fernandes	PL
Goiânia	GO	Sandro Mabel	UNIÃO	Coronel Claudia	AVANTE	Fred Rodrigues	PL
João Pessoa	PB	Cícero Lucena	PP	Léo Bezerra	PSB	Marcelo Queiroga	PL
Macapá	AP	Antônio Furlan	MDB	Mário Neto	PODE	Paulo Lemos	PSOL
Maceió	AL	João Henrique Caldas	PL	Rodrigo Cunha	PODE	Rafael Brito	MDB
Manaus	AM	David Almeida	AVANTE	Renato Junior	AVANTE	Capitão Alberto Neto	PL
Natal	RN	Paulinho Freire	UNIÃO	Joanna Guerra	REP	Natália Bonavides	PT
Palmas	TO	Eduardo Siqueira Campos	PODE	Pastor Carlos	AGIR	Janad Valcari	PL
Porto Alegre	RS	Sebastião Melo	MDB	Betina Worm	PL	Maria do Rosário	PT
Porto Velho	RR	Léo Moraes	PODE	Magna dos Anjos	PODE	Mariana Carvalho	UNIÃO
Recife	PE	João Campos	PSB	Victor Marques	PCdoB	Gilson Machado Neto	PL
Rio Branco	AC	Tião Bocalom	PL	Alysson Bestene	PP	Marcus Alexandre	MDB
Rio de Janeiro	RJ	Eduardo Paes	PSD	Eduardo Cavaliere	PSD	Alexandre Ramagem	PL
Salvador	BA	Bruno Soares Reis	UNIÃO	Ana Paula Matos	PDT	Kleber Rosa	PSOL
São Luís	MA	Eduardo Braide	PSD	Esmênia Miranda	PSD	Duarte Júnior	PSB
São Paulo	SP	Ricardo Nunes	MDB	Mello Araújo	PL	Guilherme Boulos	PSOL
Teresina	PI	Silvio Mendes	UNIÃO	Jeová Alencar	REP	Fábio Novo	PT
Vitória	ES	Lorenzo Pazolini	REP	Cris Samorini	PP	João Coser	PT
