= Mayors in Brazil =

Head of government of a municipality in Brazil

In Brazil, the mayor is the chief executive of the smallest territorial unit—the municipality (Portuguese: município)—and holds executive powers of the local government, in a "strong mayor-council" arrangement. In Portuguese, the mayor is called the prefeito (if male) or prefeita (if female), while the government itself is termed the prefeitura.

The current system of mayor and council (called the câmara municipal) dates from the 1930 Revolution and the Vargas era, albeit with changes how elections are conducted. Until 1982, Brazilian mayors were usually elected by the local population, with the exception of state capitals, international border towns, and "national security zones" (which included strategic mining places).

With the end of the military dictatorship and enacting of the 1988 Constitution, all mayors and councillors in the nation are elected every four years. Mayors are elected by a first past the post system in most municipalities—however, if it has more than 200,000 registered voters, an outright majority is needed to win or the vote will go to a second round runoff election. The most recent election was held in 2024.

The federal capital, Brasília, has no mayor; instead, executive duties are carried out by the governor of the Federal District.

The insular district of Fernando de Noronha, which belongs to the state of Pernambuco, does not have a mayor but has an administrator appointed by the governor. The administrator performs the duties of a mayor during a four-year term, and like Brasília, the district does not have municipal elections.

In Brazil, mayors of larger cities, such as Rio de Janeiro and São Paulo, have considerable influence in national politics and are usually potential presidential candidates.

== Mayors of Brazilian state capitals as of July 2025 ==
Town	State	Mayor	Photo	Party
Southeast capitals
Belo Horizonte	Minas Gerais	Álvaro Damião *		Brazil Union (UNIÃO)
Rio de Janeiro	Rio de Janeiro	Eduardo Paes		Social Democratic Party (PSD)
São Paulo	São Paulo	Ricardo Nunes **		Brazilian Democratic Movement (MDB)
Vitória	Espírito Santo	Lorenzo Pazolini		Republicans (PRB)
South capitals
Curitiba	Paraná	Eduardo Pimentel		Social Democratic Party (PSD)
== Florianópolis ==	Santa Catarina	Topázio Neto		Social Democratic Party (PSD)
Porto Alegre	Rio Grande do Sul	Sebastião Melo		Brazilian Democratic Movement (MDB)
Northeast capitals
Aracaju	Sergipe	Emília Corrêa		Liberal Party (PL)
Fortaleza	Ceará	Evandro Leitão		Workers' Party (PT)
João Pessoa	Paraíba	Cícero Lucena		Progressives (PP)
Maceió	Alagoas	João Henrique Caldas		Liberal Party (PL)
Natal	Rio Grande do Norte	Paulo Eduardo Freire		Brazil Union (UNIÃO)
Recife	Pernambuco	João Henrique Campos		Brazilian Socialist Party (PSB)
Salvador	Bahia	Bruno Soares Reis		Brazil Union (UNIÃO)
São Luís	Maranhão	Eduardo Braide		Social Democratic Party (PSD)
Teresina	Piauí	Silvio Mendes		Brazil Union (UNIÃO)
North capitals
Belém	Pará	Igor Normando		Brazilian Democratic Movement (MDB)
Boa Vista	Roraima	Arthur Henrique		Brazilian Democratic Movement (MDB)
Macapá	Amapá	Antônio Furlan		Brazilian Democratic Movement (MDB)
Manaus	Amazonas	David Almeida		Avante
Palmas	Tocantins	Eduardo Siqueira Campos		Podemos
Porto Velho	Rondônia	Hildon de Lima Chaves		Social Democratic Party (PSD)
Rio Branco	Acre	Tião Bocalom		Liberal Party (PL)
Center-West capitals
Campo Grande	Mato Grosso do Sul	Adriane Lopes		Progressives (PP)
Cuiabá	Mato Grosso	Abilio Brunini		Liberal Party (PL)
Goiânia	Goiás	Sandro Mabel		Brazil Union (UNIÃO)

* Álvaro Damião of the (UNIÃO) succeeded Fuad Noman in 2025, after the death of the incumbent.

** Ricardo Nunes of the (MDB) succeeded Bruno Covas in 2021, after the death of the incumbent.

== See also ==
- List of mayors of Rio de Janeiro
- List of mayors of São Paulo
- Câmara municipal (Brazil) (city council)
