= Leonardo Péricles =

Brazilian politician

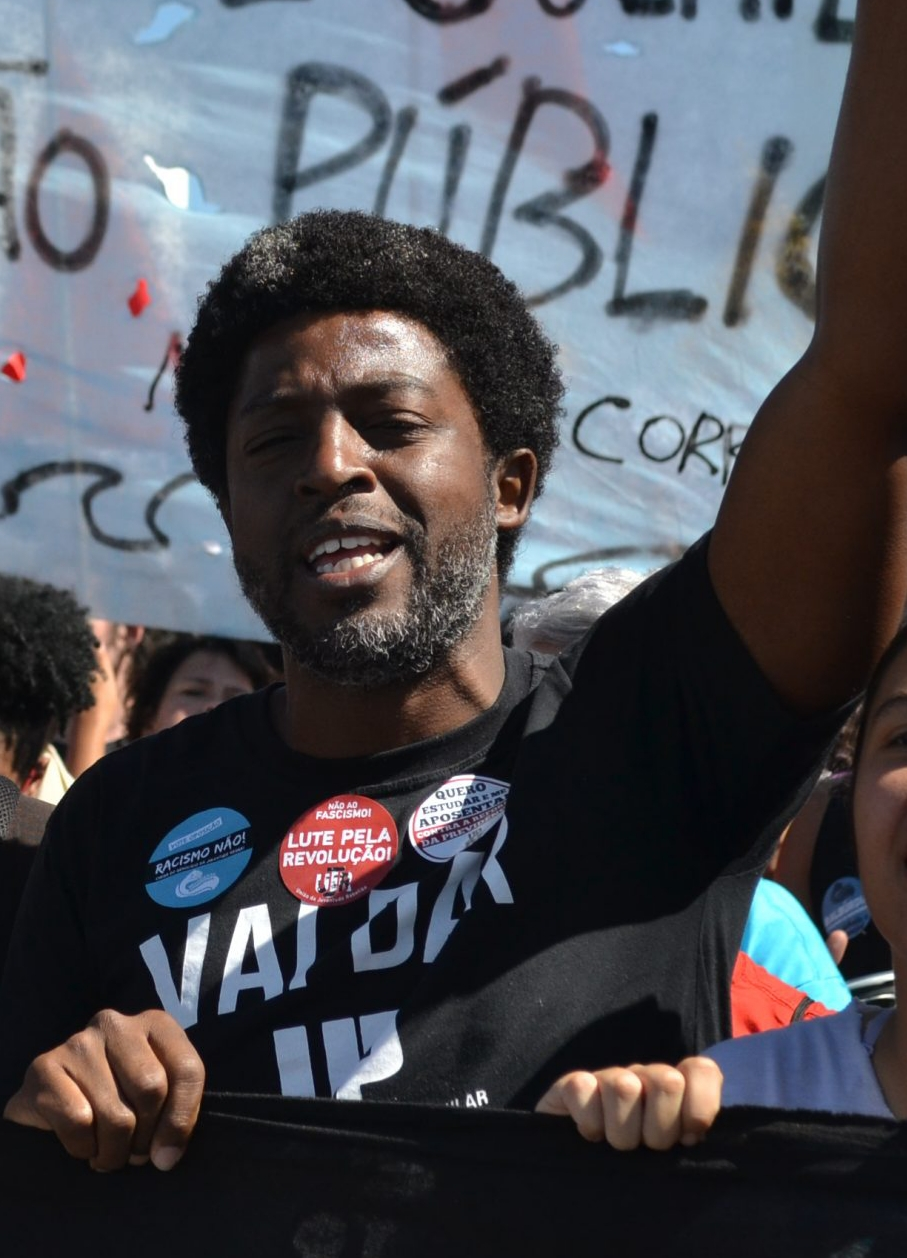
- Born: Leonardo Péricles Vieira Roque; 26 August 1981 (age 45); Belo Horizonte, Minas Gerais, Brazil
- Political party: UP (2019–present)
- Other political affiliations: PSOL (2005–2007; 2011–2019); PDT (2007–2011)

Leonardo Péricles Vieira Roque (born 26 August 1981), also known as Leo Péricles, is a Brazilian politician. He is the president and founder of the Popular Unity (UP).

He was the Popular Unity candidate for President of Brazil during the 2022 General Election.

== Biography ==
Son of Lourdes Rosária and Francisco Vieira, Leonardo was born in Belo Horizonte, but grew up in the outskirts of Contagem. He studied electronics at Father Eustáquio School, where he was a scholarship holder, during high school. In 2005 he started a course in Library Science at the Federal University of Minas Gerais (UFMG), but did not finish it.

During high school he founded the Metropolitan Association of Secondary School Students of Belo Horizonte (AMES-BH), being its first president, and was also the director of the Brazilian Union of Secondary School Students (UBES) in Minas Gerais.

In 2008 he ran for councilman for the Democratic Labor Party (PDT) in Belo Horizonte, but was not elected.

While studying Librarianship, he became the president of the Academic Directory of the course and also the director of the National Union of Students (UNE) between 2009 and 2010.

Since 2011 he has been part of the Movement of Struggle in Neighborhoods, Villages and Slums (MLB). He is currently one of MLB's national leaders.

In 2012 he moved to the Eliana Silva Occupation, in the Barreiro region, where he met Poliana Souza, whom he married and has two children. The family resides in the same occupation to this day.

From 2014 he served as National President of Popular Unity (UP), which obtained party registration in December 2019 with about 1.2 million signatures.

In the 2020 municipal elections, UP considered launching Leonardo as mayor of Belo Horizonte, but chose to run as vice-mayor for candidate Áurea Carolina (PSOL). The party came in 4th place in the municipal elections, with 8.33% of the votes (103,115 votes).

At the convention between November 12 and 14, 2021, the party delegates unanimously approved Léo Péricles' pre-candidacy for the Presidency of the Republic in 2022.

On July 24, 2022, he was chosen by UP to run for the Presidency of the Republic, with Samara Martins as the vice-presidential candidate.

== Electoral performance ==
Year	Election	Party	Office	Coalition	Partners	Party	Votes	Percent	Result
2008	Municipal Election of Belo Horizonte	PDT	Councillor	"BH Can Do More" (PDT, PCB)	—N/a		654	0.05%	Surrogate
2020	Municipal Election of Belo Horizonte	UP	Vice Mayor	"Left-Wing Front BH in Movement" (PSOL, UP, PCB)	Áurea Carolina	PSOL	103,115	8.33%	Not elected
2022	Presidential election	UP	President	—N/a	Samara Martins	UP	53,519	0.05%	Not elected

Party political offices
New political party	UP nominee for Mayor of Belo Horizonte; 2020	Most recent
New political party	UP nominee for President of Brazil; 2022	Most recent
