= Iza Lourença =

Brazilian politician

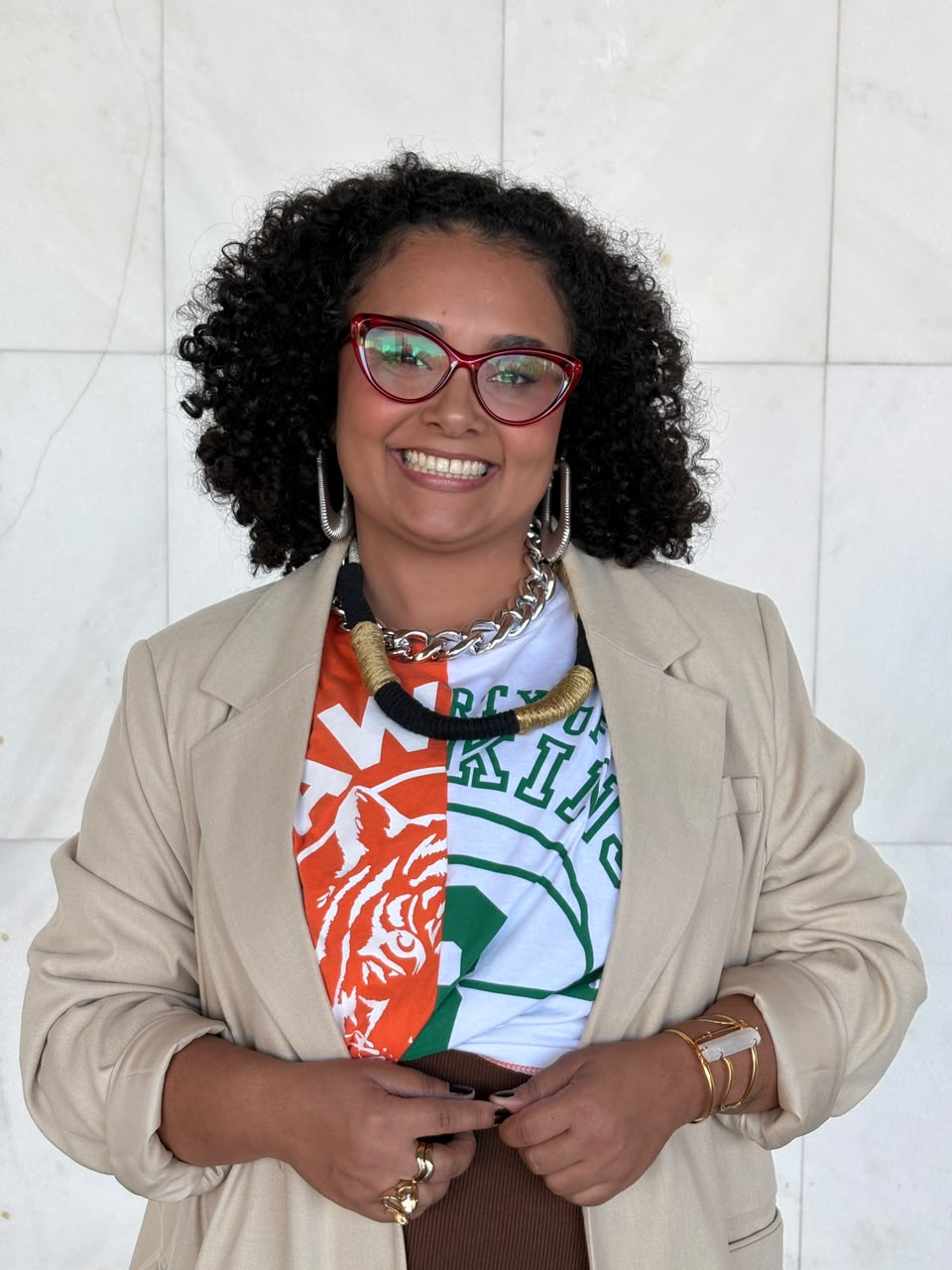
- Iza Lourença in July 2026

City Councillor of Belo Horizonte
- Incumbent
- Assumed office 2021

Personal details
- Born: Izabella Lourença de Amorim Romualdo; 1 September 1993 (age 33) Belo Horizonte, Minas Gerais, Brazil
- Party: PSOL (2016–present)
- Education: Federal University of Minas Gerais
- Profession: Metro ticket clerk
- Website: izalourenca.com.br

Izabella Lourença de Amorim Romualdo, better known as Iza Lourença (born 1 September 1993 in Belo Horizonte), is a Brazilian politician. She holds a degree in Social Communication from the Federal University of Minas Gerais (UFMG) and is a city councillor of Belo Horizonte for the Socialism and Liberty Party (PSOL). In 2024, she became the first Black woman re-elected as city councillor in the capital of Minas Gerais, with 21,485 votes, making her the third most-voted candidate in the municipality.

In 2020, she was elected city councillor with 7,771 votes, becoming the most-voted Black woman in the city. A feminist, anti-racist activist and campaigner for youth rights and socio-environmental justice, Iza was the first openly bisexual councillor to take office in the Municipal Chamber of Belo Horizonte; as of April 2026, she had introduced 67 bills and passed 29 laws for Belo Horizonte.

== Political career ==
From 2011 to 2016, during her undergraduate studies, she took part in the student movement, serving two terms as general coordinator of the Central Students' Directory (DCE) and of the University Council of UFMG. In 2016, she joined PSOL, believing in the need to act politically against the impeachment of former president Dilma Rousseff (PT), the first woman elected president of Brazil. In 2018, she created Consciência Barreiro – a popular education course preparing students for the National High School Exam (Enem). In 2019, she was elected rank-and-file director of the Union of Metro Transport Workers of Minas Gerais (Sindimetro/MG).

In 2020, she created the social project Flores de Resistência ("Flowers of Resistance"), which seeks to guarantee menstrual dignity for women and menstruating people in situations of social vulnerability on the outskirts of Belo Horizonte, distributing ecological pads and other personal hygiene products.

In her 2020 campaign for city councillor of Belo Horizonte, she took part in the collective movement As Muitas, headed by Áurea Carolina as candidate for mayor. Upon taking office for her first term in 2021, she joined GabinetonaBH, a collective mandate in Belo Horizonte's legislative branch, together with then-councillors Bella Gonçalves and Cida Falabella. Iza remained in GabinetonaBH until 2026, when the project ended after Cida Falabella took over the Municipal Secretariat of Culture of Belo Horizonte.

In 2022, Iza ran for federal deputy for Minas Gerais for PSOL, winning 51,304 votes, and in 2018 she ran, also for PSOL, for state deputy, reaching 12,505 votes. In 2014, she ran for federal deputy for Minas Gerais for the PSTU, receiving 1,223 votes. Within PSOL, she is part of the political faction Semear.

== Gender-based political violence ==
During her first term, Iza took a leading role in political confrontations with conservative sectors and consolidated herself as the main voice of resistance to the far right in the Belo Horizonte City Council. Because of her parliamentary work, Iza and her daughter, only 4 years old, received rape and death threats, and for almost a year had their freedom restricted.

In August 2024, the Civil Police closed the investigation after the arrest of the main suspect behind the threats and forwarded the case to the Public Prosecutor's Office of Minas Gerais. In view of the challenge faced by women, especially Black women, in remaining in politics, Iza, together with other parliamentarians, passed Law 11,818 in 2024 to confront gender-based political violence. The law also protects women who hold leadership positions, not only in the legislature.

During the 2024 electoral campaign, a flag bearing Iza's photo was violently torn by a man who, according to security camera footage, did not want to be identified. Another flag was burned, also by a man hiding his own face. The Federal Police (PF) opened an inquiry to investigate the electoral crime of damage to campaign material and gender-based political violence against her re-election campaign. The Program for the Protection of Human Rights Defenders (PPDDH) followed the case.

== Fare-free public transport in Belo Horizonte ==
Iza Lourença consolidated herself as the main spokesperson of the movement for the implementation of free public transport (tarifa zero) in Belo Horizonte. Together with collectives and social movements, the councillor introduced Bill 60/2025 in the City Council, which was signed by 22 members. However, after pressure from mayor Álvaro Damião, the bill was defeated in the chamber's first round of voting. Despite this, popular pressure, combined with political efforts, secured the implementation of fare-free transport on Sundays and holidays on all municipal lines of the capital of Minas Gerais.

== Mandato-Movimento ==
Mandato-Movimento ("Mandate-Movement") is the name given to the mandate exercised by the parliamentarian in Belo Horizonte, as it is built in partnership with the city's social and cultural movements. Its main causes are the promotion of women's rights and LGBTQ+ rights, anti-racism and the promotion of the life and freedom of Black and peripheral youth, the defense of public education, and the environmental and climate justice struggle.
