= Fernando Pimentel =

Brazilian politician and economist (born 1951)

His Excellency Fernando Pimentel
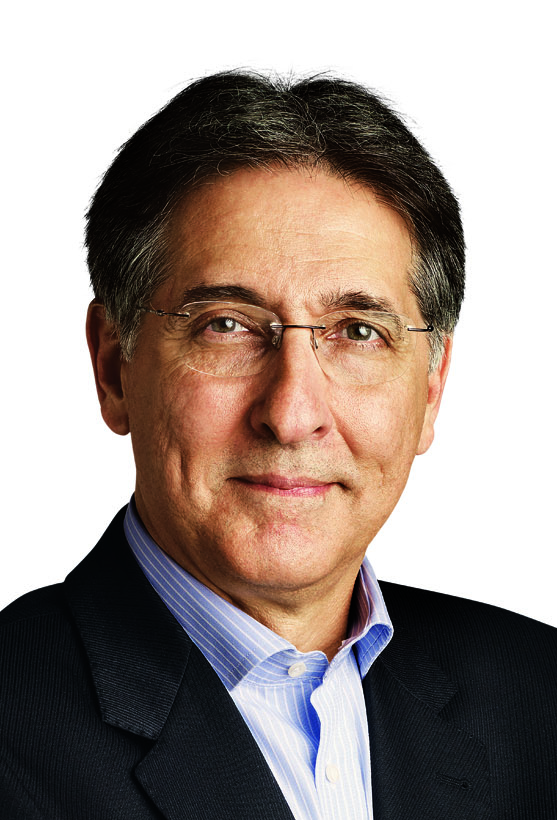

Governor of Minas Gerais
- In office 1 January 2015 – 1 January 2019
- Vice Governor: Antônio Andrade
- Preceded by: Alberto Pinto Coelho Júnior
- Succeeded by: Romeu Zema

Minister of Development, Industry and Foreign Trade
- In office 1 January 2011 – 12 February 2014
- President: Dilma Rousseff
- Preceded by: Miguel Jorge
- Succeeded by: Mauro Borges Lemos

Mayor of Belo Horizonte
- In office 8 November 2001 – 1 January 2009
- Preceded by: Célio de Castro
- Succeeded by: Márcio Lacerda

Personal details
- Born: Fernando Damata Pimentel; 31 March 1951 (age 75) Belo Horizonte, Minas Gerais, Brazil
- Party: PT (2000–present)
- Education: Pontifical Catholic University of Minas Gerais (L.); Federal University of Minas Gerais (M.D.)
- Occupation: Politician
- Profession: Economist
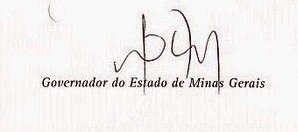
- Signature

Fernando Damata Pimentel (born 31 March 1951) is a Brazilian politician and economist. He is a member of the Workers' Party (PT). He was the Mayor of Belo Horizonte from 2001 to 2009, the Minister of Development, Industry and Foreign Trade in the Cabinet of former Brazilian president Dilma Rousseff from 2011 to 2014 and the Governor of Minas Gerais from 2015 to 2019.

== Ministry of Development ==
From 2011-2014 he was the minister of Development, Industry and Foreign Trade during the Presidency of Dilma Rousseff of whom he had been a close friend since their time as students.

He was accused and condemned for influence peddling and money laundering to 10 years and 6 months. but succeeded to be innocented in 2022 in the revision process for insufficient proves.

== Governor of Minas Gerais ==
In 2014, he announced his departure from the Ministry of Development to run for governor of Minas Gerais for the Workers' Party (PT). On October 5, he was elected governor of Minas Gerais in the first round, with 52.98% of the valid votes, defeating candidate Pimenta da Veiga, from the Brazilian Social Democracy Party (PSDB). He took office on January 1, 2015.

== Reelection 2018 ==
Pimental was a candidate for his own succession in 2018, but only came in 3rd place with 23.12% of the votes behind Romeu Zema (NOVO) and Antonio Anastasia (PMDB) and was eliminated.

His government was overshadowed by a hole in public finances of Minas Gerais, that was estimated at R$30–99.5 billion at the end of his term. During his government the state of Minas Gerais had to declare the state of public calamity for Minas Gerais to be able to pay the salaries of the public serveants. and a conviction for corruption, influence peddling and money laundering during his time as Minister of Development, Industry and Foreign Trade during the term of Dilma Rousseff in 2019

== Life ==
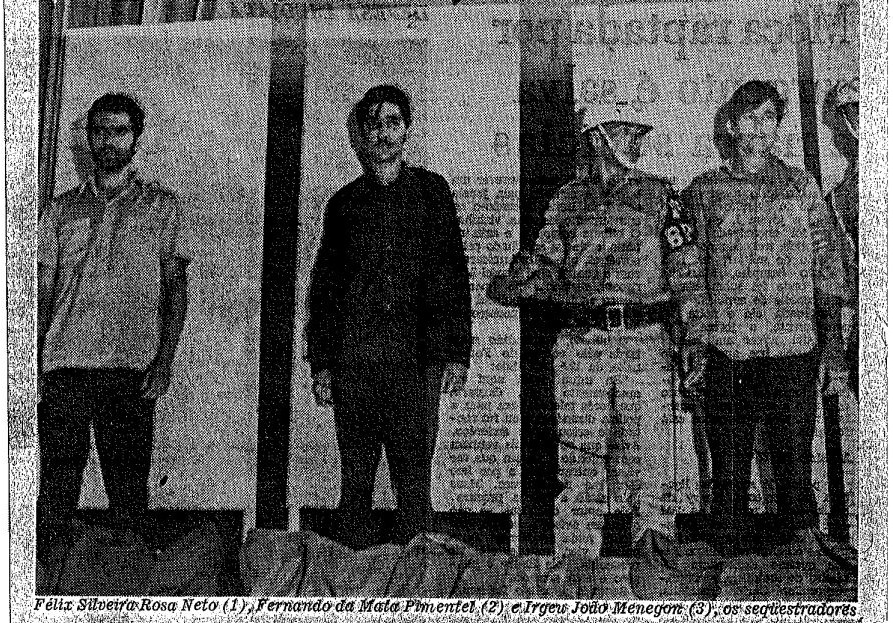
Fernando Damata Pimentel

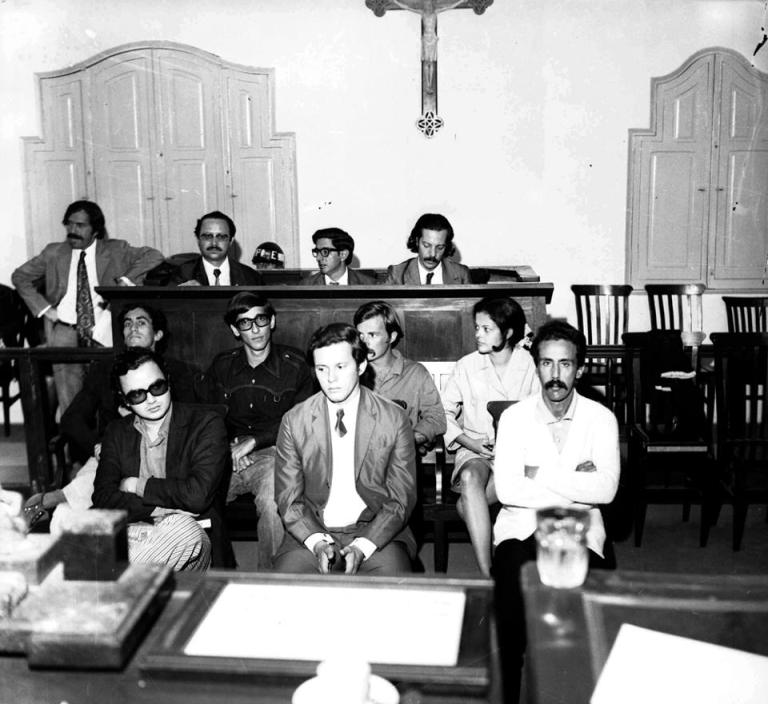
Fernando Pimentel and Dilma Rousseff in 1972

Fernando Pimentel studied Economy at the Federal University of Minas Gerais. He is a member of the PT, a party he helped to create.

He has been married twice and has two adopted children.

=== Academic career ===
He has held a teaching position and engaged in scholarly activity as coordinator of the Extension Center of the Faculty of Economic Sciences, UFMG. Since August 1978, he has been an assistant professor in their Department of Economics. He is also an active member of the professional categories of entities, has held the vice-presidency of the Association of University Teachers of Belo Horizonte (1985–1987) and he was president of the Regional Economy of Minas Gerais (1991–1992), having been reelected twice; Furthermore, he was a counselor of the same for an overlapping time, between 1990 and 1992. He was also director of the Union of Economists of Minas Gerais (1986–1992).

== See also ==
- List of mayors of Belo Horizonte

Political offices
Preceded by Célio de Castro	Mayor of Belo Horizonte; 2001–09	Succeeded by Marcio Lacerda
Preceded by Miguel Jorge	Minister of Development, Industry and Foreign Trade; 2011–14	Succeeded by Mauro Borges Lemos
Preceded by Alberto Pinto Coelho	Governor of Minas Gerais; 2015–19	Succeeded by Romeu Zema
