= Nely Aquino =

Brazilian politician (born 1972)

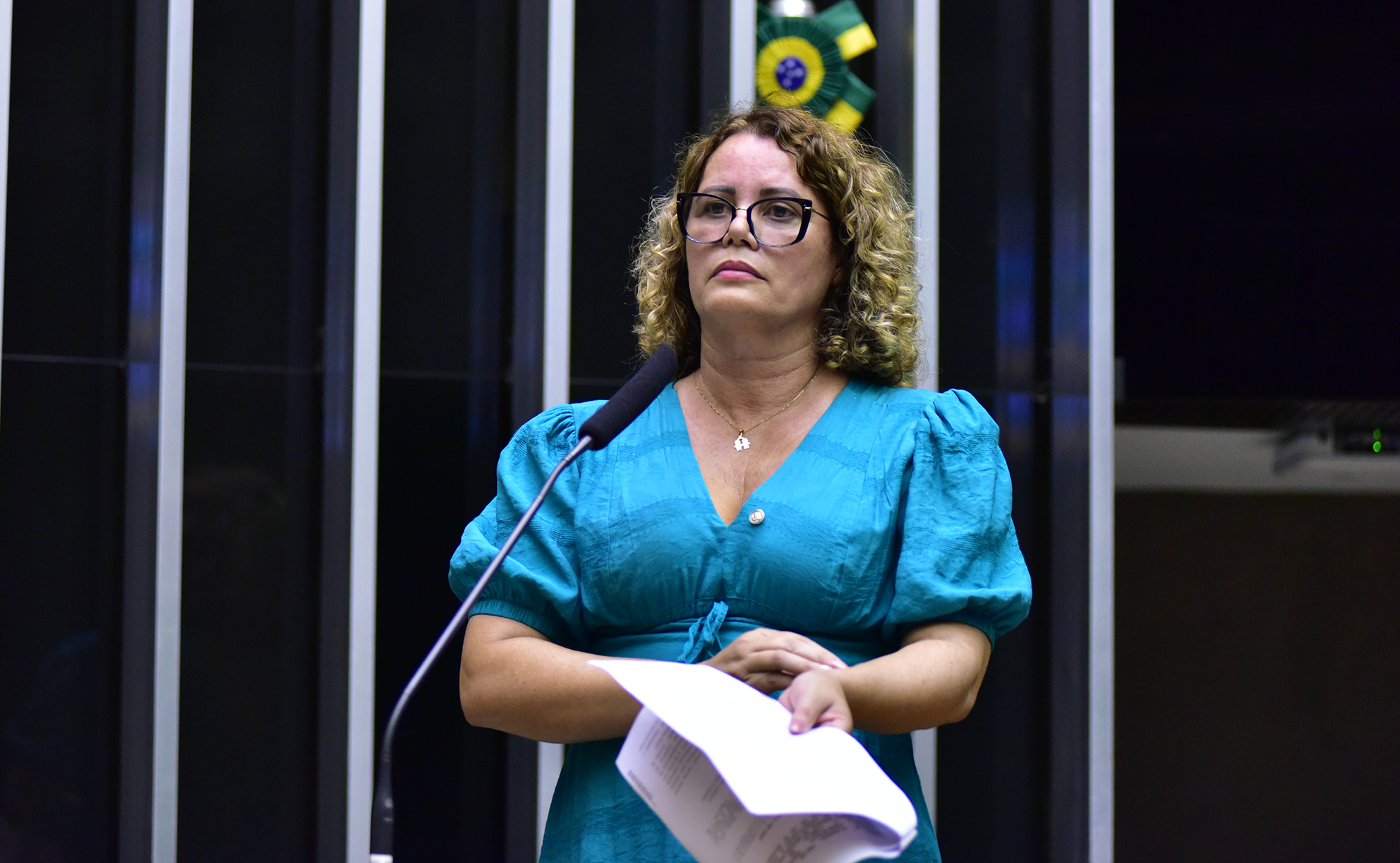
- Aquino in 2024

Member of the Chamber of Deputies
- Incumbent
- Assumed office 1 February 2023
- Constituency: Minas Gerais

Personal details
- Born: 17 November 1972 (age 53)
- Party: Podemos (since 2020)

Neli Pereira de Aquino (born 17 November 1972) is a Brazilian politician serving as a member of the Chamber of Deputies since 2023. From 2019 to 2022, she served as chairwoman of the Municipal Chamber of Belo Horizonte.
