= Célio de Castro =

Brazilian politician, professor, and doctor

49th Mayor of Belo Horizonte, Brazil
- In office January 1, 1997 – November 2002
- Preceded by: Patrus Ananias
- Succeeded by: Fernando da Mata Pimentel

Personal details
- Born: July 11, 1932 Carmópolis de Minas, Brazil
- Died: July 20, 2008 (aged 76) Belo Horizonte, Brazil
- Party: Workers' Party (Brazil) (PT)
- Profession: Doctor and Professor

Célio de Castro (July 11, 1932 - July 20, 2008) was a Brazilian politician, professor and doctor. He served as the Mayor of Belo Horizonte, the capital of the state of Minas Gerais, from January 1, 1997, until November 2002.

Célio de Castro died at Hospital Mater Dei in Belo Horizonte of multiple organ failure on July 20, 2008, at the age of 76.

Political offices
Preceded by Patrus Ananias	Mayor of Belo Horizonte; January 1, 1997 – November 2002	Succeeded by Fernando da Mata Pimentel
