= Capitão Alberto Neto =

Brazilian politician (born 1982)

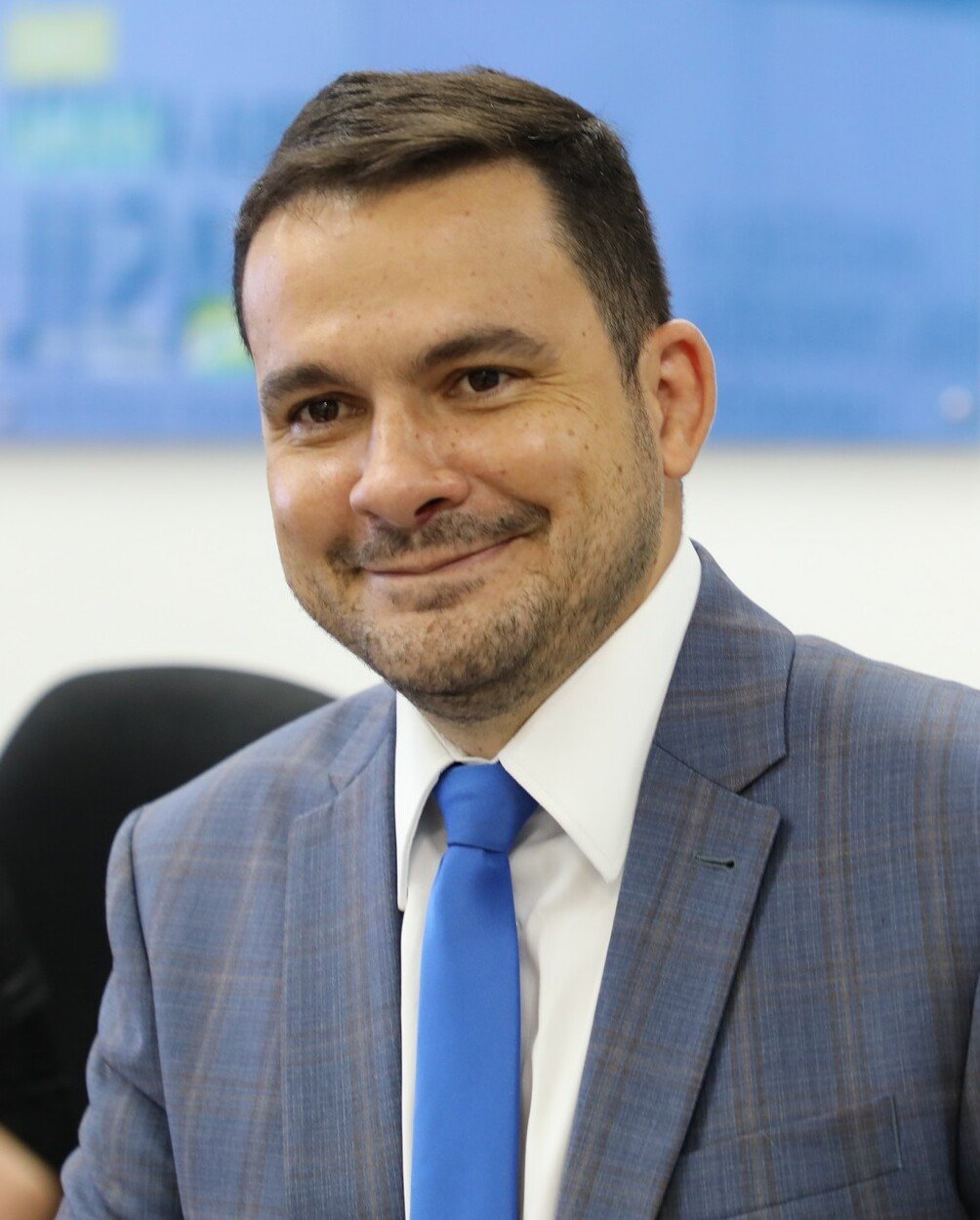
- Neto in 2021

Member of the Chamber of Deputies
- Incumbent
- Assumed office 1 February 2019
- Constituency: Amazonas

Personal details
- Born: 5 May 1982 (age 44)
- Party: Liberal Party (since 2022)

Alberto Barros Cavalcante Neto, better known as Capitão Alberto Neto (born 5 May 1982), is a Brazilian politician serving as a member of the Chamber of Deputies since 2019. He was a candidate for mayor of Manaus in the 2020 and 2024 elections.
