= Duda Salabert =

Brazilian politician and literature teacher

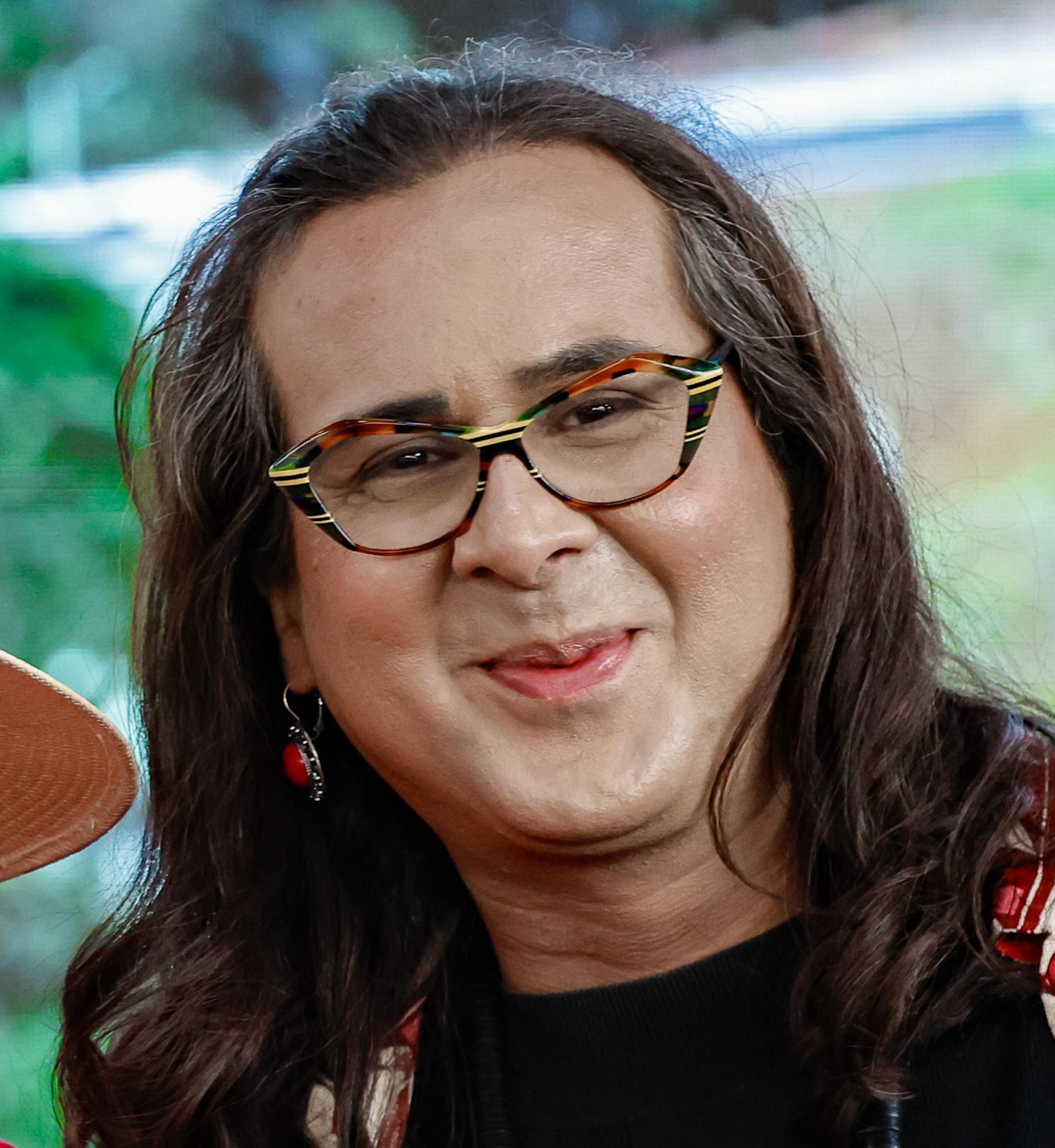
- Salabert in 2025

Member of the Chamber of Deputies
- Incumbent
- Assumed office 1 February 2023
- Constituency: Minas Gerais

Councillor of Belo Horizonte
- In office 1 January 2021 – 1 February 2023
- Constituency: At-large

Personal details
- Born: Duda Salabert Rosa; 2 May 1981 (age 45) Belo Horizonte, Minas Gerais, Brazil
- Party: PSOL (2017–2019 , 2026–present)
- Other political affiliations: PDT (2019–2026)
- Spouse: Raíssa Novaes (m. 2011)
- Education: Minas Gerais State University
- Occupation: Teacher

Duda Salabert Rosa (born 2 May 1981) is a Brazilian politician, environmentalist, and teacher. In 2020, she became the first transgender person to serve on the city council of Belo Horizonte after campaigning as a Democratic Labour Party candidate. She was elected with over 37,000 votes, more than any city council candidate in the history of Minas Gerais at the time.

Since 2023, she has represented the state of Minas Gerais as a federal deputy. A member of the Socialism and Liberty Party (PSOL) from 2017 to 2019, she rejoined the PSOL in 2026.

== Personal life ==
Salabert began working as a teacher in 2002. She cofounded Transvest, a non-governmental organization focused on getting trans people on university and fighting transphobia in general.

Duda is a lesbian, married to Raíssa. In 2019, they had a child and chose a gender-neutral name for them.

Duda is vegan.

In 2025, Salabert announced that she had been diagnosed with autism spectrum disorder (ASD) and giftedness. The deputy reported that the diagnostic investigation took place through a neuropsychological evaluation, after years of dealing with depressive episodes.

In August 2026, a court in Salvador sentenced influencer Bianca Barreto to two years in prison and 20,000 reais in fines for transphobia, after she posted a video stating that Salabert was "a guy who says he is a trans woman but is married to a woman and has a son or daughter." On social media, Salabert criticized the ruling and stated that she had not initiated the lawsuit against Barreto.

== Political activity ==
In 2018, Salabert campaigned as a Socialism and Liberty Party candidate to represent the state of Minas Gerais in the Brazilian Senate. Salabert said that she had received invitations to campaign for other offices but chose the Senate as a form of provocation, noting that the etymology of the term senate relates to men and that "if it is a space made for gentlemen, a travesti woman seeking this space is extremely provocative". (Note: Original quote in Portuguese: "Eu aceitei pelo caráter simbólico. Senado, na sua etimologia, significa 'senhores'. Se é um espaço feito para senhores, uma mulher travesti disputando esse espaço é extremamente provocativo.") She additionally stated that she had been targeted on social media and that she feared escalation to physical violence. She was 36 years old at the time. Salabert received more than 350,000 votes, not winning the election but becoming the first transgender person to run for the Brazilian Senate.

In April 2019, Salabert left the Socialism and Liberty Party, criticizing the party for "structural transphobia" and anthropocentrism.

In 2020, Salabert was elected to the city council of Belo Horizonte after campaigning as a member of the Democratic Labour Party. She was the first transgender person elected to the Belo Horizonte city council, and with 37,000 votes in support, the most-voted-for city council candidate in Minas Gerais history at the time. In December 2020, the school where Salabert taught received an email threatening both her and the school if she remained in her position, and she was fired.

In June 2021, Salabert announced that she would campaign for a Senate seat in 2022. She had previously pledged to serve for her entire 4-year term on the Belo Horizonte city council, but stated that she had been advised by the United Nations and the Inter-American Commission on Human Rights to seek a position in the federal government so that she could be protected by the Polícia Federal after having received death threats.

In 2022 Salabert and Erika Hilton became the first two openly transgender people elected to the National Congress of Brazil, with both of them elected to its Chamber of Deputies.

On March 31, 2026, she announced that she would leave the Democratic Labour Party and return to PSOL.
