= Marcio Lacerda =

Brazilian politician (born 1946)

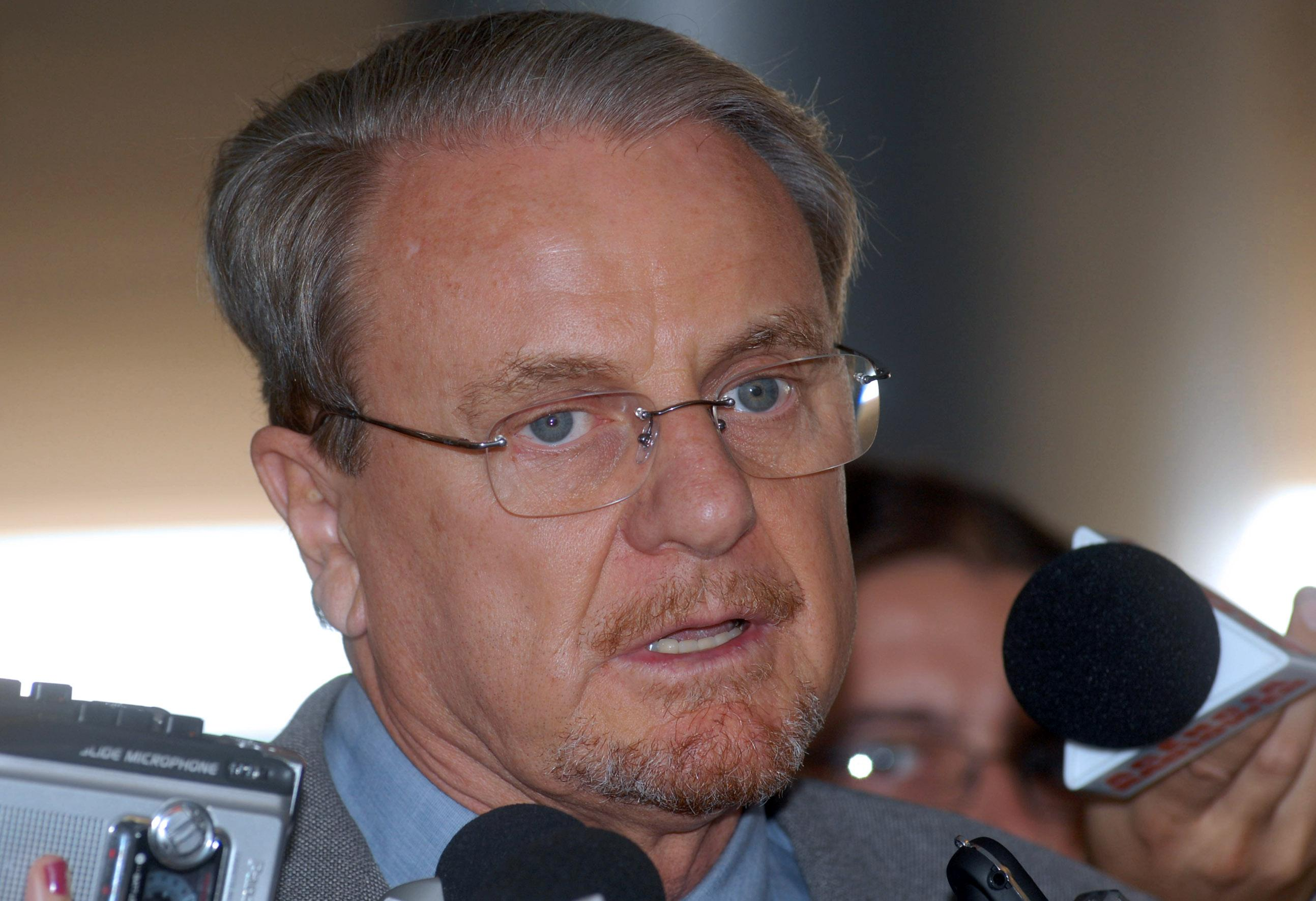
Marcio Lacerda, 2008

Marcio Araújo de Lacerda (born on Leopoldina, Minas Gerais on January 22, 1946) is the former Mayor of Belo Horizonte in the state of Minas Gerais, Brazil. Marcio Lacerda is a member of the Brazilian Socialist Party (PSB).

== See also ==
- List of mayors of Belo Horizonte

Political offices
Preceded by Fernando da Mata Pimentel	Mayor of Belo Horizonte; 2009 - 2017	Succeeded by Alexandre Kalil
