= Pedro Rousseff =

Brazilian politician (born 1999)

- Rouseff in 2024

Federal Deputy-elect
- Assuming office 1 February 2027
- Constituency: Minas Gerais

Councillor of Belo Horizonte
- Incumbent
- Assumed office 1 January 2025
- Constituency: At-large

Personal details
- Born: Pedro Farah Rousseff; 5 November 1999 (age 26) Belo Horizonte, Minas Gerais, Brazil
- Party: PT (since 2022)
- Relatives: Dilma Rousseff (great-aunt)

Pedro Farah Rousseff (born 5 November 1999) is a Brazilian politician who was elected member of the Chamber of Deputies in 2026. He has been a member of the Municipal Chamber of Belo Horizonte since 2025. He is the great-nephew of Dilma Rousseff.
