= Catarina Guerra =

Brazilian politician

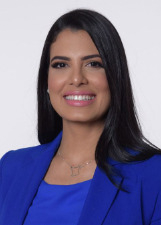

State deputy of Roraima
- Incumbent
- Assumed office 1 February 2019

Personal details
- Born: Catarina de Lima Guerra da Silva; 28 January 1986 (age 40) Boa Vista, Roraima, Brazil
- Party: Solidariedade (before 2022); UNIÃO (2022–present)

Catarina de Lima Guerra da Silva (born 28 January 1986) is a Brazilian lawyer and politician. She is currently a state deputy in the state of Roraima, affiliated with Brazil Union. Guerra has also participated in beauty pageants in Latin America, including in Reina Hispanoamericana. She ran to become the mayor of Boa Vista in 2024, but lost to Arthur Henrique.

== Electoral history ==
Year	Election	Candidate	Party	Coalition	Vice	Votes	%	Result
2018	Roraima state elections	State Deputy	Solidariedade	Roraima cannot stop (Solidariedade, DC)	—	4,897	1.83%	Won
2022	Roraima state elections	State Deputy	UNIÃO	—	—	6,939	2.35%	Won
2024	Boa Vista municipal elections	Mayor	UNIÃO	A new Boa Vista, good for everyone (PDT, UNIÃO, Republicanos, NOVO, PSD, PP, Avante)	Sargento Damosiel (PDT)	40,410	22.81%	Lost
