= Pablo Almeida =

Brazilian politician (born 1993)

Member of the Legislative Assembly of Minas Gerais
- Incumbent
- Assumed office 1 February 2027

Personal details
- Born: 13 June 1993 (age 33)
- Party: Liberal Party (since 2023)

Phablo Gomes Almeida (born 13 June 1993) is a Brazilian politician who was elected member of the Legislative Assembly of Minas Gerais in 2026. He has been a member of the Municipal Chamber of Belo Horizonte since 2025.
