= Janad Valcari =

Brazilian politician (born 1988)

- Valcari in 2024

Member-elect of the Chamber of Deputies
- Assuming office 1 February 2027
- Constituency: Tocantins

Member of the Legislative Assembly of Tocantins
- Incumbent
- Assumed office 1 February 2023
- Constituency: At-large

Member of the Municipal Chamber of Palmas
- In office 1 January 2021 – 1 February 2023
- Constituency: At-large

Personal details
- Born: Janad Marques de Freitas Valcari; 5 February 1988 (age 38) Palmeirópolis, Goiás, Brazil
- Party: PP (2026–present)
- Other political affiliations: PMB (2018–2020); PODE (2020–2022); PL (2022–2026)
- Profession: Teacher

Janad Valcari (born 5 February 1988) is a Brazilian politician who was elected member of the Chamber of Deputies in 2026. She has been a member of the Legislative Assembly of the State of Tocantins since 2025.
