= Cássio Andrade =

Brazilian politician (born 1981)

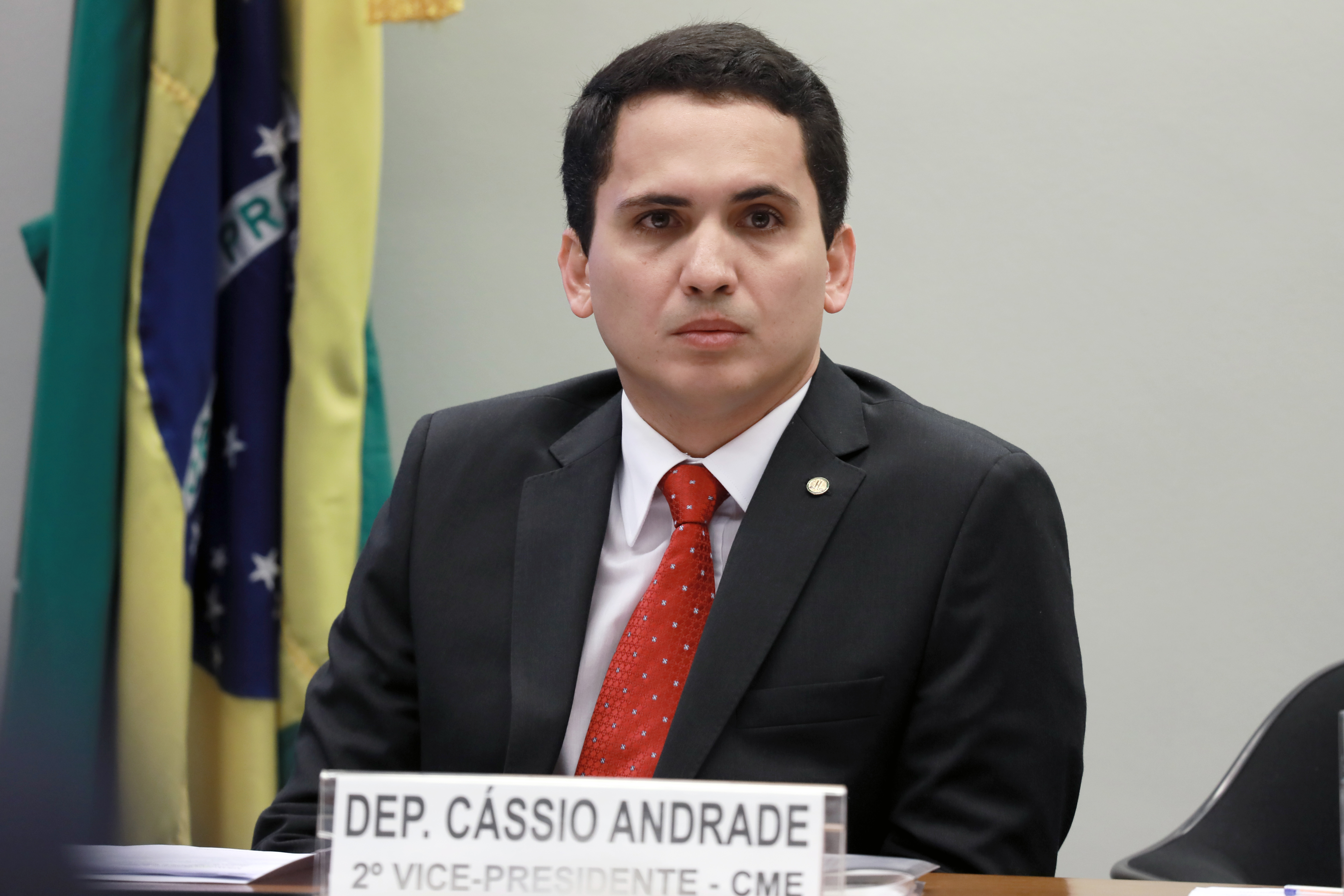
- Andrade in 2019

Member of the Chamber of Deputies
- In office 1 February 2019 – 31 January 2023
- Constituency: Pará

Personal details
- Born: 12 September 1981 (age 44)
- Party: Brazilian Democratic Movement (since 2025)
- Parent: Ademir Andrade (father)

Cássio Coelho Andrade (born 12 September 1981) is a Brazilian politician serving as deputy mayor of Belém since 2025. From 2019 to 2023, he was a member of the Chamber of Deputies. He is the son of Ademir Andrade.
