= Theyby =

Baby or child raised as gender-neutral

Theyby (plural theybies) and non-binary baby are neologisms for a baby or child raised in a way that is gender-neutral, allowing children to explore their own gender and expression on their own terms, and also referring to the accompanying parenting style. The terms and movement were initially popularized in 2018, preceding several reports of babies in 2017 being born without being assigned a gender. The practice of raising babies as gender neutral has been reported as early as 2009 and 2011. The term theyby, however, was first used in 2017. The term is a blend of the pronoun 'they' and 'baby'. Until children raised as theybies figure out their gender and pronouns, they are referred to by the parents using they/them pronouns.

== Origins and motivations ==
In many modern civilizations, a binary gender classification exists and is generally enforced from birth. In recent years, there has been increasing scrutiny of gendered socialization in parenting communities, with some questioning the extent to which the gender binary is innate versus just being the only option presented. Parents of theybies' motivations for choosing to raise their child this way include supporting gender diversity, improving self-discovery of gender, reducing sexism, and reducing the developmental effects of gender stereotypes on children. Additionally, many assert that "what their child has 'between their legs'" is not relevant to their gender presentation and is, simply, "nobody's business".

Some parents of children who are LGBT subscribe to a "born this way" view on sexual orientation and gender identity, contrasting the belief that parenting choices can "make" children non-heterosexual. This argument has been echoed by parents who practice gender-neutral parenting, they use this view to emphasize their children may or may not necessarily identify as LGBT when they are old enough to know on their own who they are, as they believe identity is innate and not changed by their upbringing.

The varying degrees to which parents attempt to reduce the effects of gendered socialization can depend on how hostile their community is when confronted with those who choose to parent outside the gender binary. LGBT parents report higher levels of anxiety when making the decision to raise their child as a theyby or to allow them to explore gender from a young age. This is due to the higher scrutiny these parents face from critics who believe that being raised by two parents who are the same gender will "make" a child gay. These parents have also acknowledged that in some situations they even go against their personal beliefs about gender-neutrality for their children or are inconsistent with their resistance of stereotypes due to their feeling of higher scrutinization.

== Associated parenting style ==
Aside from not disclosing their child's biological sex at birth (the most literal practice of raising a theyby), there are a variety of approaches of differing vigilances that parents have adopted when introducing gender neutrality into their parenting. The majority of parents who have shared their experiences with gender-neutral parenting or raising a theyby report that they believe in a child-centered approach to parenting.

One of the most common ways gender-neutral parenting has been practiced is through varying children's toy options. The vast majority of children's toys are strictly separated by gender, with different skills being prioritized between the two. Toys marketed as "for girls" tend to focus on encouraging domesticity, vanity, and general emotional awareness. Alternatively, toys "for boys" most often focus on increasing spatial reasoning skills, encouraging physicality, and normalizing aggression. By encouraging only specific skillsets for each gender, they both end up having gaps in life skills that make their options later in life more limited. This has contributed to the current societal norm of men working and generally being in positions of more power, and women taking care of their children and handling domestic duties. To combat these gaps, parents have started offering their children some toy options that are gender-neutral and some toys geared towards each gender, all framed as equally preferable choices. This variety of options is often offered in other important aspects of childhood development such as clothing and extracurricular activities.

== Legal recognition ==
In the United States, various states have passed legislation allowing for gender-neutral identifiers on birth certificates, including:

	Notes
California	Gender neutral designation permitted at birth
Colorado	Initial birth certificates must say "Male" or "Female". However, an amended birth certificate can be issued to change the "sex designation" to "X". For minors, a sex designation change request must be endorsed by "a professional medical or mental health care provider licensed in good standing" stating that the person has undergone appropriate treatment "for the purpose of gender transition" or that the person "has an intersex condition".
Connecticut	Requires some documentation of treatment clinically appropriate for the purpose of gender transition (surgery is not required)
D.C.	Requires some documentation of treatment clinically appropriate for the purpose of gender transition (surgery is not required)
Illinois	Requires some documentation of treatment clinically appropriate for the purpose of gender transition (surgery is not required)
Maine	Gender neutral designation permitted at birth
Michigan	No gender-neutral option is provided on the form for birth registration. However, the "sex designation" can later be requested to be changed to "X". For minors, younger than 14, a parent or a legal guardian must consent to the change.
Nevada	
New Jersey	
New Mexico	
New York	
Ohio	Court order required to initiate change
Oregon	
Rhode Island	
Utah	Court order required to initiate change
Vermont	
Washington	No gender-neutral option is provided on the form for birth registration. However, the "sex designation" can later be requested to be changed to "X". For minors, a sex designation change request must be endorsed by a "licensed health care provider or licensed mental health care provider, whose scope of practice allows them to determine that the requested change is consistent with the minor's identity".

It is also possible to receive a "U" gender marker for babies in Canada.

== Criticism ==
There has been criticism towards the concept of theybies, including from Christian organizations. Common criticisms include that it is a selfish choice on the part of the parent, equating a choice on gender to be a choice of anatomy, that it is harmful to keep the gender "secret" from other people, and the possibility of increased child bullying.

Although the principle and reports do not set an age limit before children can decide their gender, some critics consider an age limit before children can choose their gender a key component of theybies, and suggest that such an age limit is unethical.

== See also ==
- Sex assignment at birth
- Intersex
- Non-binary gender
