= List of mayors of Belo Horizonte =

Mayor of Belo Horizonte
- Prefeito de Belo Horizonte

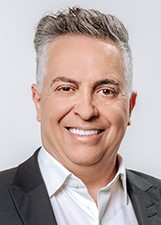
- Incumbent; Álvaro Damião since 26 March 2025
- Term length: Four years, renewable once
- Inaugural holder: Adalberto Ferraz
- Formation: 29 December 1897; 128 years ago
- Deputy: Vice Mayor

This is a list of the mayors of the city of Belo Horizonte, Brazil.

== Mayors ==
Office term numberº	Name	Term start	Term end
1	Adalberto Dias Ferraz da Luz	December 29, 1897	September 7, 1898
2	Américo Werneck	September 9, 1898	October 27, 1898
3	Venceslau Brás	October 27, 1898	January 31, 1899
4	Francisco Antônio de Sales	February 1, 1899	September 2, 1899
5	Bernardo Pinto Monteiro	September 19, 1899	September 7, 1902
6	Cel. Francisco Bressane Azevedo	September 7, 1902	October 28, 1905
7	Cícero Ribeiro Ferreira Rodrigues	April 20, 1905	May 10, 1905
8	Antônio Carlos Ribeiro de Andrada	October 30, 1905	September 7, 1906
9	Benjamin Jacob	September 7, 1906	April 16, 1909
10	Benjamin Franklin Silviano Brandão	April 16, 1909	September 7, 1910
11	Olinto Deodato dos Reis Meireles	September 7, 1910	September 7, 1914
12	Cornélio Vaz de Melo	September 7, 1914	September 7, 1916
13	Afonso Vaz de Melo	September 7, 1916	September 7, 1922
14	Flávio Fernandes dos Santos	September 7, 1922	September 7, 1926
15	Francisco Campos	September 7, 1926	October 16, 1926
16	Cristiano Monteiro Machado	October 16, 1926	November 28, 1929
17	Alcides Lins	November 28, 1929	September 7, 1930
18	Luís Barbosa Gonçalves Pena	September 7, 1930	December 18, 1932
19	Otávio Goulart Pena	December 22, 1932	December 15, 1933
20	José Soares de Matos	December 15, 1933	April 8, 1935
21	Otacílio Negrão de Lima	April 8, 1935	April 18, 1938
22	José Osvaldo de Araújo	April 18, 1938	October 19, 1940
23	Juscelino Kubitschek de Oliveira	October 19, 1940	October 30, 1945
24	João Gusman Júnior	October 30, 1945	February 4, 1946
25	Pedro Laborne Tavares	February 4, 1946	August 16, 1946
26	Gumercindo Couto e Silva	August 17, 1946	December 26, 1946
27	Emídio Beruto	December 26, 1946	March 21, 1947
28	João Franzen de Lima	March 21, 1947	December 12, 1947
29	Otacilio Negrão de Lima	December 12, 1947	February 1, 1951
30	Américo Renné Gianetti	February 1, 1951	September 6, 1954
31	Sebastião de Brito	September 6, 1954	February 1, 1955
32	Celso Melo de Azevedo	February 1, 1955	May 31, 1957
33	Alberto Valadares Ferreira da Silva	June 1, 1957	June 30, 1957
32	Celso Melo de Azevedo	July 1, 1957	January 31, 1959
34	Amintas Ferreira de Barros	January 31, 1959	January 31, 1963
35	Pe. Clóvis de Sousa e Silva	1962	1963
36	Jorge Carone Filho	January 31, 1963	January 31, 1965
37	Osvaldo Pieruccetti	January 31, 1965	January 31, 1967
38	Luís Gonzaga de Sousa Lima	January 31, 1967	March 18, 1971
37	Osvaldo Pieruccetti	March 18, 1971	April 10, 1975
39	Luís Verano	April 10, 1975	April 3, 1979
40	Maurício de Freitas Teixeira Campos	April 3, 1979	May 14, 1982
41	Júlio Arnoldo Laender	May 14, 1982	April 12, 1983
42	Hélio Carvalho Garcia	April 12, 1983	August 14, 1984
43	Antônio Carlos Flores Carone	August 14, 1984	August 23, 1984
44	Ruy José Viana Lage	August 23, 1984	January 1, 1986
45	Sérgio Mario Ferrara	January 1, 1986	January 1, 1989
46	João Pimenta da Veiga Filho	January 1, 1989	April 1, 1990
47	Eduardo Brandão de Azeredo	April 1, 1990	January 1, 1993
48	Patrus Ananias de Sousa	January 1, 1993	January 1, 1997
49	Célio de Castro	January 1, 1997	November 8, 2002
50	Fernando Pimentel	November 8, 2002	January 1, 2009
51	Marcio Lacerda	January 1, 2009	January 1, 2017
52	Alexandre Kalil	January 1, 2017	March 28, 2022
53	Fuad Noman	March 28, 2022	March 26, 2025
54	Álvaro Damião	March 26, 2025	Incumbent

== See also ==
- Belo Horizonte history
- Belo Horizonte history (in Portuguese)
- List of mayors of largest cities in Brazil (in Portuguese)
- List of mayors of capitals of Brazil (in Portuguese)
