= Record Minas =

- Belo Horizonte, Minas Gerais; Brazil
- Channels: Digital: 28 (UHF); Virtual: 2

Programming
- Affiliations: Record

Ownership
- Owner: Grupo Record; (Rádio e Televisão Record S.A.)

History
- First air date: May 12, 1991
- Former names: TV Sociedade (1991-1993); TV Record Minas (1993-2016); RecordTV Minas (2016-2023)
- Former channel numbers: Analog: 2 (VHF, 1991–2017)

Technical information
- Licensing authority: ANATEL
- ERP: 6 kW
- Transmitter coordinates: 19°58′15.4″S 43°55′47.3″W

Links
- Public license information: Profile
- Website: recordminas.tv.br

Record Minas (channel 2) is a Record-owned-and-operated station licensed to Belo Horizonte, capital of the state of Minas Gerais. The station covers its metropolitan area and much of the state's inland. Its studios are located in the Floresta neighborhood, while its transmitting antenna is located at Serra do Curral, at Belvedere.

== History ==
The VHF channel 2 allocation was first used by TV Alterosa from 1962 to 1977, when it moved to channel 5. The frequency was left unused until 1991. That year, TV Sociedade, owned by former state senator Newton Cardoso, signed on as a Record affiliate; two years later, members of the Universal Church of the Kingdom of God bought some of the station's shares and renamed it TV Record Minas, becoming an O&O in the process. As of 2007, Edir Macedo, the leader of both the UCKG and the Record network, controlled 50% of the shares. In 2000, the station moved to its current premises at the Floresta neighborhood.

In 2009, the station started working for its repositioning in order to reach vice-leadership in ratings. This was consolidated the following year when, on October 28, a special event was held at Ilustríssimo, revealing its new local programming. On January 3, 2011, the station registered an all-time high in its ratings, reporting 7.34 points in the station's IBOPE measurement. Its news operation was leading the ratings in 2016.

== Programming ==
As of January 2025, the station produces more than 38 hours of local programming per week: MG no Ar, Balanço Geral MG, Cidade Alerta Minas, MG Record and Balanço Geral Edição de Sábado. Since 2016, it has been the vice-leader in terms of ratings, as of 2024, reaching at least 854,000 viewers a day.
