= Pimenta da Veiga =

Former communications minister of Brazil

João Pimenta da Veiga Filho
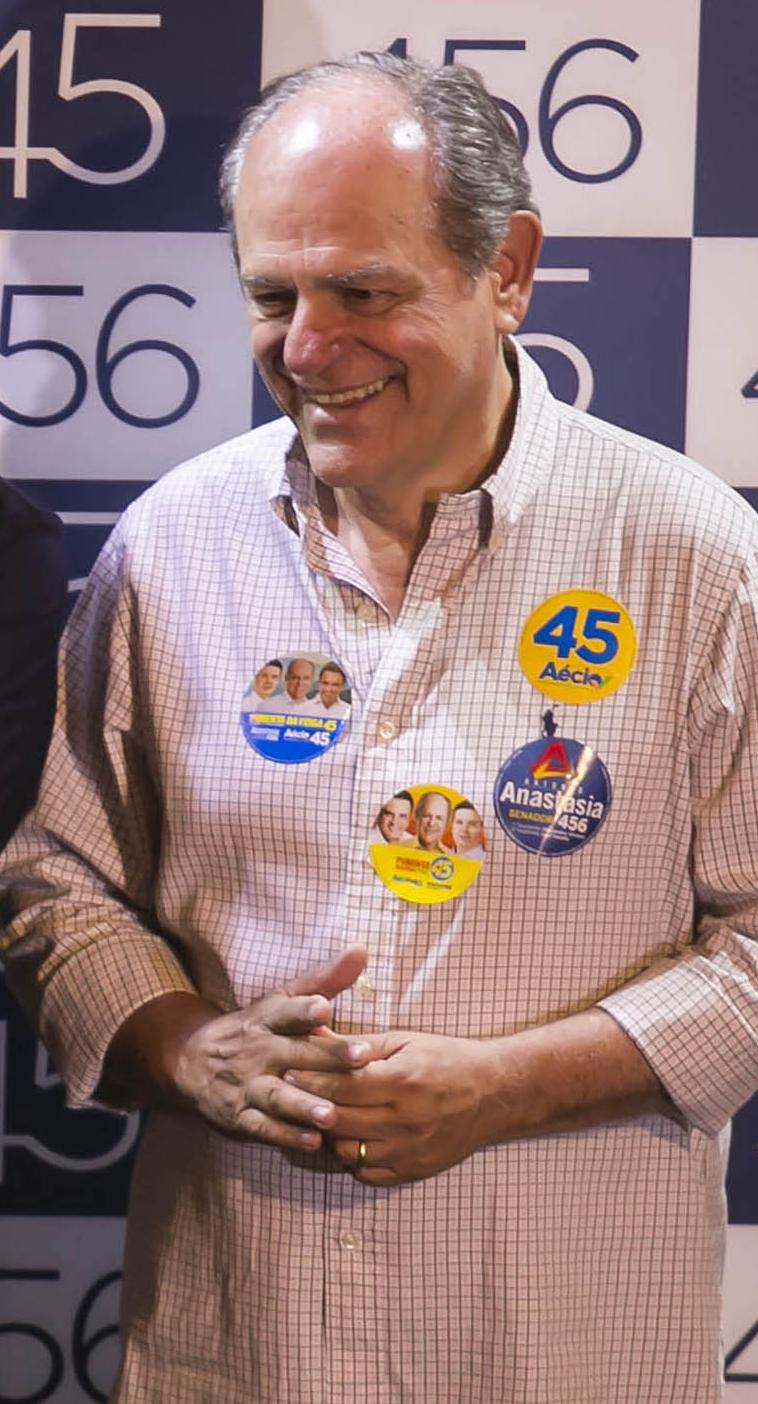

Mayor of Belo Horizonte
- In office 1 January 1989 – 1 April 1990
- Preceded by: Sérgio Ferrara
- Succeeded by: Eduardo Azeredo

Personal details
- Born: 1947 (age 77–78); Belo Horizonte
- Occupation: Lawyer; politician

João Pimenta da Veiga Filho (Jr.) is a former communications minister of Brazil.

Pimenta da Veiga was born in 1947, in Belo Horizonte. Graduated in Law and Social Sciences from the Federal University of Rio de Janeiro in the year of 1972.

He was elected for the Chamber of Deputies for the state of Minas Gerais for the mandates of 1979/83, 1983/87 and 1987/91. In the Chamber of Deputies Pimenta da Veiga participated as an effective member in the Committees for Education and Culture, Law and Constitution, Mines and Energy, and presided over the Special Committee for the New Civil Code, in 1983. He headed the PMDB (Party of the Brazilian Democratic Movement) in the Chamber of Deputies in the period 1985/86. Pimenta da Veiga was one of the founder members of PSDB (Brazilian Social Democratic Party). He was the Party leader in the Chamber in 1988 and its President in January/February 1989. In 1988, he was elected Mayor of Belo Horizonte and indicated as candidate for Governor of the state of Minas Gerais, in 1990.

In 1994, Pimenta da Veiga was elected National President of PSDB and in the last polls he won a seat in the Chamber representing the state of Minas Gerais for the mandate of 1999/2003.

Nominated as Minister of Communications on January 1 by the President of the Republic.

Nowadays he has retired from politics and is working as a lawyer in Brasília-DF.
