= Alexandre Kalil =

Brazilian politician and sports administrator

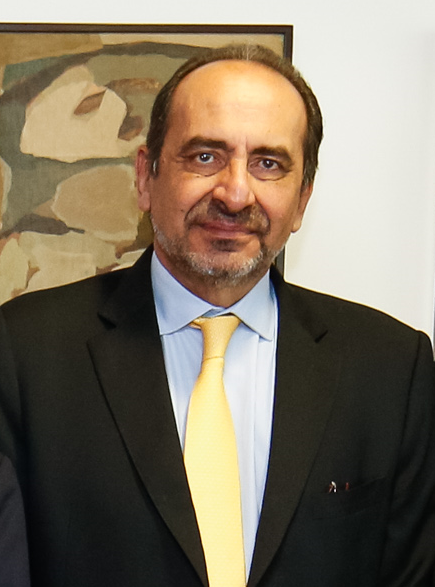

Mayor of Belo Horizonte
- In office January 1, 2017 – March 28, 2022
- Vice Mayor: Paulo Lamac; Fuad Noman
- Preceded by: Marcio Lacerda
- Succeeded by: Fuad Noman

President of Clube Atlético Mineiro
- In office 2008–2014
- Preceded by: Luiz Otávio Valadares
- Succeeded by: Daniel Nepomuceno

Personal details
- Born: March 25, 1959 (age 67) Belo Horizonte, Minas Gerais, Brazil
- Party: PDT (2025–present)
- Other political affiliations: PSDB (2001–13); PSB (2013–15); PHS (2016–19); PSD (2019–2024); Republicanos (2024-2025)
- Occupation: Politician
- Profession: Sports administrator

Alexandre Kalil (Belo Horizonte; March 25, 1959) is a Brazilian politician and sports administrator. He served as mayor of Belo Horizonte from 2017 to 2022. He served as president of Clube Atlético Mineiro, a football club based in Belo Horizonte, Brazil that competes in Campeonato Brasileiro, the top tier of the Brazilian football league system, as well as in the Campeonato Mineiro, the premier state league of Minas Gerais. Alexandre Kalil is the president under whom the club has won more official trophies, with six, including its only Copa Libertadores and Recopa Sudamericana. He was succeeded by Daniel Nepomuceno, who took over as president of the club in 2014.

Alexandre is of Syrian descent, he is the only son of former club president Elias Kalil. Alexandre Kalil's career in Atletico started in the early 1980s, managing its volleyball team. He was also the football director and the president of the deliberation council.

Alexandre Kalil studied Civil Engineering until the fourth of the five-year course, and left to work in the family engineering company, Erkal, founded by his father Elias and his uncle Roberto Kalil. He registered its candidacy to the Chamber of Deputies in 2014, but gave up campaigning, allegedly tired of politics. Later, he joined the PHS and announced he would run for mayor with the "No More Politicians" motto, presenting himself as an alternative to Brazil's crumbling political system. Running a small-scale campaign, he defeated traditional parties like the ruling PMDB, of president Michel Temer and the Workers' Party and won a narrow second-round victory over João Leite, a former goalkeeper of Clube Atlético Mineiro and a current state legislator of the Brazilian Social Democracy Party.

== See also ==
- List of mayors of Belo Horizonte

Sporting positions
| Preceded by Luiz Otávio Valadares | President of Clube Atlético Mineiro; 2008–2014 | Succeeded by Daniel Nepomuceno |
Political offices
| Preceded by Marcio Lacerda | Mayor of Belo Horizonte; 2017–2022 | Succeeded by Fuad Noman |
