= Fuad Noman =

Brazilian writer, economist and politician (1947–2025)

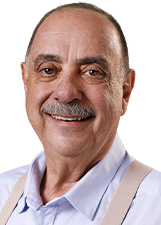
- Noman in 2024

53rd Mayor of Belo Horizonte
- In office 28 March 2022 – 26 March 2025
- Preceded by: Alexandre Kalil
- Succeeded by: Álvaro Damião

Secretary of Transport and Construction of Minas Gerais
- In office 1 January 2007 – 30 June 2010

Secretary of Finance of Minas Gerais
- In office 1 January 2003 – 31 December 2006

Personal details
- Born: Fuad Jorge Noman Filho; 30 June 1947 Belo Horizonte, Minas Gerais, Brazil
- Died: 26 March 2025 (aged 77) Belo Horizonte, Minas Gerais, Brazil
- Party: PSDB (2003–2017); PSD (2019–2025)
- Spouse: Monica Drumond
- Children: 2

Fuad Jorge Noman Filho (30 June 1947 – 26 March 2025) was a Brazilian economist and politician who was the mayor of the city of Belo Horizonte from 2022 until his death in 2025. He came into office after the resignation of former mayor Alexandre Kalil, whom he was vice-mayor under from 2021 to 2022. He was affiliated with the Social Democratic Party (PSD).

== Biography ==
Noman was born in 1947, and was of Syrian background. He graduated from Centro Universitário de Brasília with a degree in economic sciences, with a specialization in economic programming and budgetary execution. He also received an honorary doctorate from the State University of Montes Claros. He was married to Monica Drumond and has two sons, Paulo and Gustavo, with 4 grandchildren. He was an advisor to and benefactor of Clube Atlético Mineiro.

=== Political career ===
Noman started his career in government working for the Central Bank of Brazil. He became executive-secretary to the Chief of Staff's office during the presidency of Fernando Henrique Cardoso, and later would do consulting work with the International Monetary Fund (IMF). He later became first the finance secretary of the state of Minas Gerais, then later the Transport and Works secretary, both under the administrations of Aécio Neves and Antonio Anastasia. He later was the president of the state-owned gas company Gasmig, as well as the Extraordinary State Minister for the Coordination of Investments.

In 2017, Noman became the finance secretary of the city of Belo Horizonte with Kalil as mayor. He was later elected vice-mayor in 2020 in the first round, succeeding Paulo Lamac. After Kalil resigned in 2022 to run for governor, Noman became mayor. He was elected to a term in his own right in 2024, winning against Bruno Engler of the Liberal Party (PL).

Noman's administration marked a shift away from the policies adopted by the prior Kalil administration, which led to tensions with municipal advisors appointed by Kalil. Among his administration's more notable actions was the reduction of the value paid by the municipality towards the granting of right to build permits in the city, which had been instituted by the municipal administrator of the city master plan after having been approved by the Kalil administration. The policy led to the reduction of payments made towards new buildings along the Avenida do Contorno, one of the main arterial roads in downtown Belo Horizonte, by half. The change in policy ran against studies made by Noman's administration itself, but after pressure from lobbying groups such as FIEMG, however, the policy was maintained, approved, and sanctioned.

== Death ==
Shortly after taking office again, Noman was hospitalized due to respiratory issues on 3 January 2025. His vice-mayor, Álvaro Damião, assumed the duties of mayor while Noman was on medical leave. Noman died in office on 26 March of cardiopulmonary arrest and respiratory failure. He was 77. Noman died 83 days into his second term. He was succeeded by Damião.

== Published works ==
Noman was also the author of two erotic romantic novels, Greed and The Bitter and the Sweet.

Political offices
Preceded by Alexandre Kalil	Mayor of Belo Horizonte; 2022–2025	Succeeded by Álvaro Damião
