= Popular Unity (Brazil) =

Brazilian political party

Popular Unity Unidade Popular
- President: Leonardo Péricles
- Vice President: Samara Martins
- Founded: 16 June 2016 (10 years ago)
- Registered: 10 December 2019 (6 years ago)
- Headquarters: SQN 316, Bloco K, 330, Brasília
- Newspaper: A Verdade (The Truth)
- Ideology: Socialism
- Political position: Left-wing
- Colors: Black and white
- TSE Identification Number: 80

Website
- unidadepopular.org.br

Popular Unity (Portuguese: Unidade Popular, UP), also known as Popular Unity for Socialism (Portuguese: Unidade Popular pelo Socialismo, UPS), is a Brazilian political party founded on 16 June 2016, which had its right to launch candidacies recognized by the Superior Electoral Court (TSE) on 10 December 2019. As a socialist party, it is connected to homeless workers' movements and defends the nationalization of the banking system, social control of all monopolies, capitalist consortia, and the means of production at-large, as well as rural land reform and collectivization.

In the 2018 Brazilian general election, Popular Unity supported the Socialism and Liberty Party presidential bid of Guilherme Boulos and Sônia Guajajara. Its first National Congress was held in Belo Horizonte from 23 to 24 March 2019. Its slogan is "party of the poor, with the poor, and for the poor". On 10 December 2019, the TSE approved the party's registration and assigned the number 80 for pollings.

== History ==
=== Electoral Registration Process ===
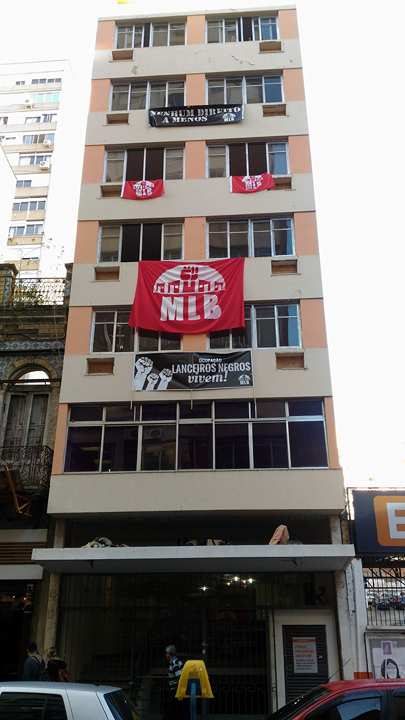
Ocupação Lanceiros Negros Vivem, in Porto Alegre, with MLB flags on the façade. MLB helped collect signatures for the foundation of UP.

Other movements, such as the Revolutionary Communist Party's Union of Rebellion Youth (UJR), the Movement of Struggle in the Neighborhoods, Vilas and Slums (MLB), the Class Struggle Movement, and the Olga Benário Women's Movement (MMOB) have joined the registration efforts.

The collection of signatures of support for registration of the party before the TSE was started in 2014. According to paragraph 2 of article 7 of TSE Resolution 23,465, the minimum support must correspond to at least 0.5% of the votes cast in the last general election for the Chamber of Deputies (approximately 500,000), not counting blank and invalid votes, distributed in one third, or more, of the states, with a minimum of 0.1% of the electorate that voted in each state. As of 27 October 2018, it had over 418,000 validated signatures of support. According to the organization, more than a million support forms were filled out.

The party's statute was published in the Diário Oficial da União on 3 September 2014, signed by its president, Leonardo Péricles Vieira Roque, coordinator of the Movement of Struggle in Bairros, Vilas and Favelas (MLB). Its symbol is three raised fists, symbolizing unity of action and democratic centralism, on a black or white background on which are written the name and the acronym of the organization.

Since 2014, the party's popularity has progressively increased among students and organized labor, acquiring national expression from its opposition to the government of Michel Temer, and then to Jair Bolsonaro in the 2018 Brazilian presidential election.

In the 2018 election, UP, still unable to field a presidential candidate, declared its support for the presidential candidacy of Guilherme Boulos and his running mate Sônia Guajajara, an electoral slate launched by the Socialism and Freedom Party (PSOL). According to the organization, the support for the slate is due to the fact that it is "the only one willing to adopt the proposed wealth tax and repeal the treasonous measures of Michel Temer's government, among them the Labor Reform and the freeze of social investments."

Its first congress was held in Belo Horizonte on 23–24 March, 2019. Its slogan is "party of the poor, with the poor, and for the poor". The party's application for registration was filed with the Superior Electoral Court in August 2019 and approved on 10 December of the same year. The party was given the number 80 for voting at the polls.

=== 2020 municipal elections ===
The 2020 Brazilian municipal elections were the first that the party participated in. According to the party's national President, Leonardo Péricles, the party's plan was to launch the maximum number of candidates for mayor in the main Brazilian capitals in 2020.

	City Hall	State	Candidates	Coalition	Votes (number)	position
1	Mauá	São Paulo	Amanda Bispo	-	2.04% (3,950)	7th
2	Maceió	Alagoas	Lenilda Luna	-	1.28% (4,875)	8th
3	Fortaleza	Ceará	Paula Colares	-	0.07% (893)	10th
4	Teresina	Piauí	Pedro Laurentino	Pelo Poder Popular (UP / PCB)	0.11% (457)	11th
5	João Pessoa	Paraíba	Rafael Freire	-	0.24% (865)	12th
6	Goiânia	Goiás	Fabio Júnior	-	0.17% (1,052)	14th
7	Recife	Pernambuco	Thiago Santos	-	0.15% (1,232)	8th
8	Caruaru	Pernambuco	Rafael Wanderley	-	0.22% (374)	6th
9	Jaboatão dos Guararapes	Pernambuco	Serginaldo Santos	-	0.34% (839)	9th
10	Itabirito	Minas Gerais	Sara Boratti	-	3.08% (864)	4th
11	Nova Lima	Minas Gerais	Jobert "Jobão" Fernando de Paula	UP/PSOL	1.45% (764)	7th
12	Cabo Frio	Rio de Janeiro	Prof. Fernando De Oliveira	-	0.35% (356)	11th
13	Itabuna	Bahia	Pedro Eliodório	-	0.19% (193)	10th
14	Teixeira de Freitas	Bahia	Pablo Franstêscouly	-	0.13% (98)	7th

Besides its own candidacies, the party joined the coalition of the PSOL candidate in Porto Alegre, Federal Deputy Fernanda Melchionna. Previously, the party had considered launching Priscila Voigt as a candidate. In Rio de Janeiro, UP supported the candidacy of Rio de Janeiro state representative Renata Souza. In São Paulo, Popular Unity joined the PSOL coalition supporting the candidacy of Guilherme Boulos, on the same ticket as Luiza Erundina. In Belo Horizonte, the party's national President, Leonardo Péricles, was a candidate for Vice-Mayor on the slate of Federal Deputy Áurea Carolina (PSOL). In Florianópolis, the party was part of the Popular Front, together with PSOL, PT, PDT, PCdoB, PSB and REDE, as well as the PCLCP and UCB organizations. In Belém, the party was part of the coalition of the elected PSOL candidate, Edmilson Rodrigues.

For the elections, the party received R$1.2 million (US$ 300,000) from the electoral fund.

During the 2020 municipal elections, Popular Unity was the Brazilian political party with the highest proportional number of black candidates, by virtue of 70% (seventy percent) of its candidates for mayor and councilor being black men and women.

=== 2022 presidential election ===
On 14 November 2021, Leonardo Péricles had his nomination confirmed as a pre-candidate in the 2022 Brazilian presidential election. At the same event, he was also elected as national President of the party.

== Ideology ==
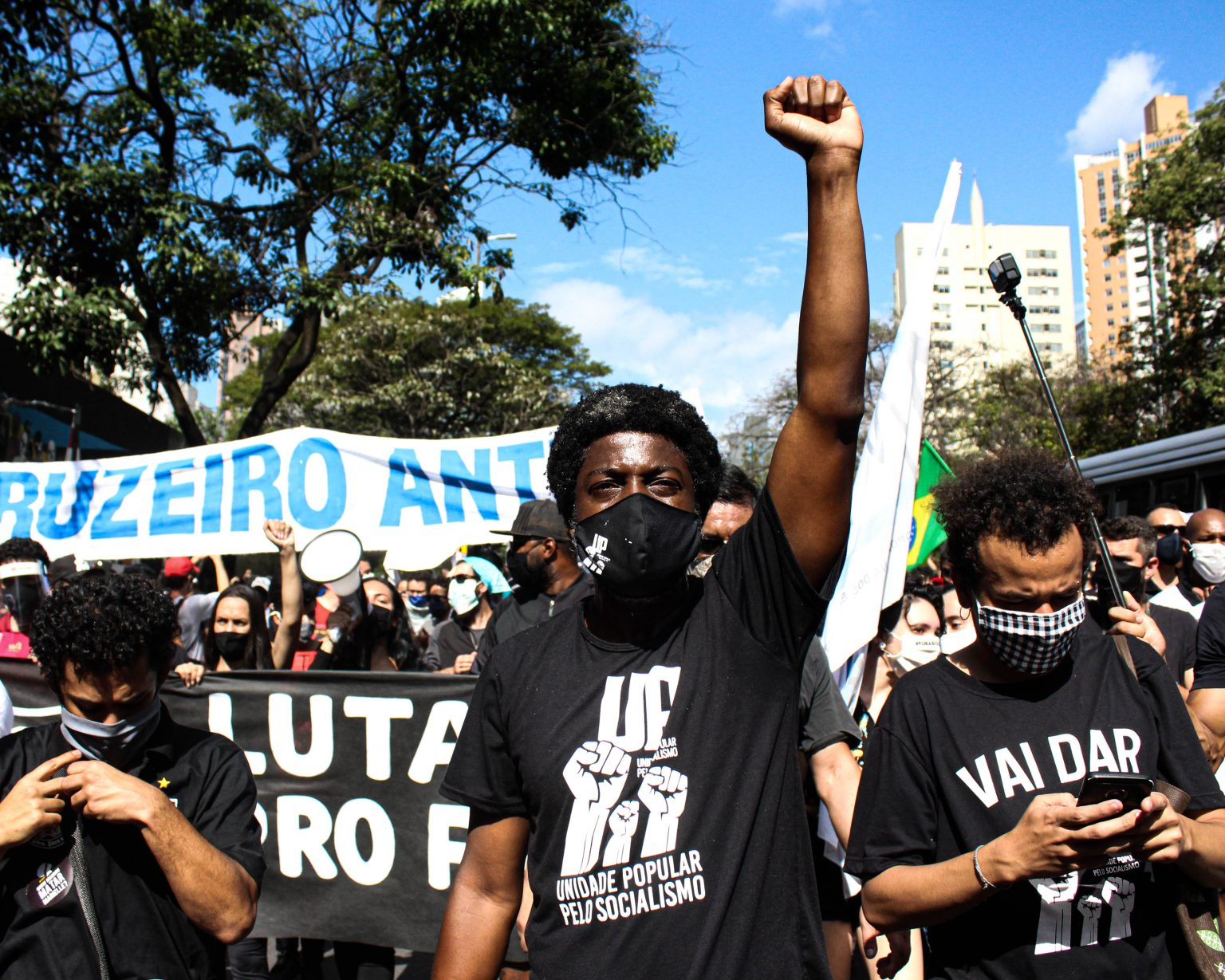
Leonardo Péricles, the party's national President

The party is linked to movements that work in defense of subsidized housing and defends the nationalization of the banking system, social control of all capitalist monopolies and consortia and of the means of production in the strategic sectors of the economy, and agrarian reform. In addition, the party is also in favor of subjecting judges and magistrates to electoral sifting and of nationalizing public transportation.

The party advocates for socialist ideals and the overcoming of capitalism, as well as fighting international financial capital and the privileges of the wealthy. According to its national president, Leonardo Péricles:

The UP proposes to be a group that contributes to the reorganization of the left-wing in the middle of the poor people in defence of a revolutionary program, but which, at the same time, dialogues with the people. Who should we fight? The international financial capital and the rich, the classes which dominate Brazil, that, ever since the era of slavery, bring racism, sexism, authoritarianism and, especially, the anti-poor politics that make Brazil dependent, humiliated and plundered as it is today.

— Leonardo Péricles, president of the Popular Unity

== Election results ==
=== Presidential election ===
Election	Candidate	Running mate	Coalition	First round		Second round		Result
Election	Candidate	Running mate	Coalition	Votes	%	Votes	%	Result
2022	Leonardo Péricles (UP)	Samara Martins (UP)	None	53,519	0.05%	–	–	Lost ✗
2026	Samara Martins (UP)	Raquel Brício (UP)	None	122,667	0.10%	–	–	Lost ✗

=== Legislative elections ===
Election	Chamber of Deputies				Federal Senate				Role in government
Election	Votes	%	Seats	+/–	Votes	%	Seats	+/–	Role in government
2022	55,780	0.05%	0 / 513	New	291,294	0.29%	0 / 81	New	Extra-parliamentary
2026	45,431	0.04%	0 / 513	0	431,082	0.21%	0 / 81	0	Extra-parliamentary

Preceded by 77 – SOLIDARIEDADE	Number of Brazilian Official Political Parties; 80 – PU (UP)	Last
