= Municipal Chamber of Belo Horizonte =

Municipal Chamber of Belo Horizonte Câmara Municipal de Belo Horizonte

Type
- Type: Unicameral
- Seats: 41

Website
- www.cmbh.mg.gov.br

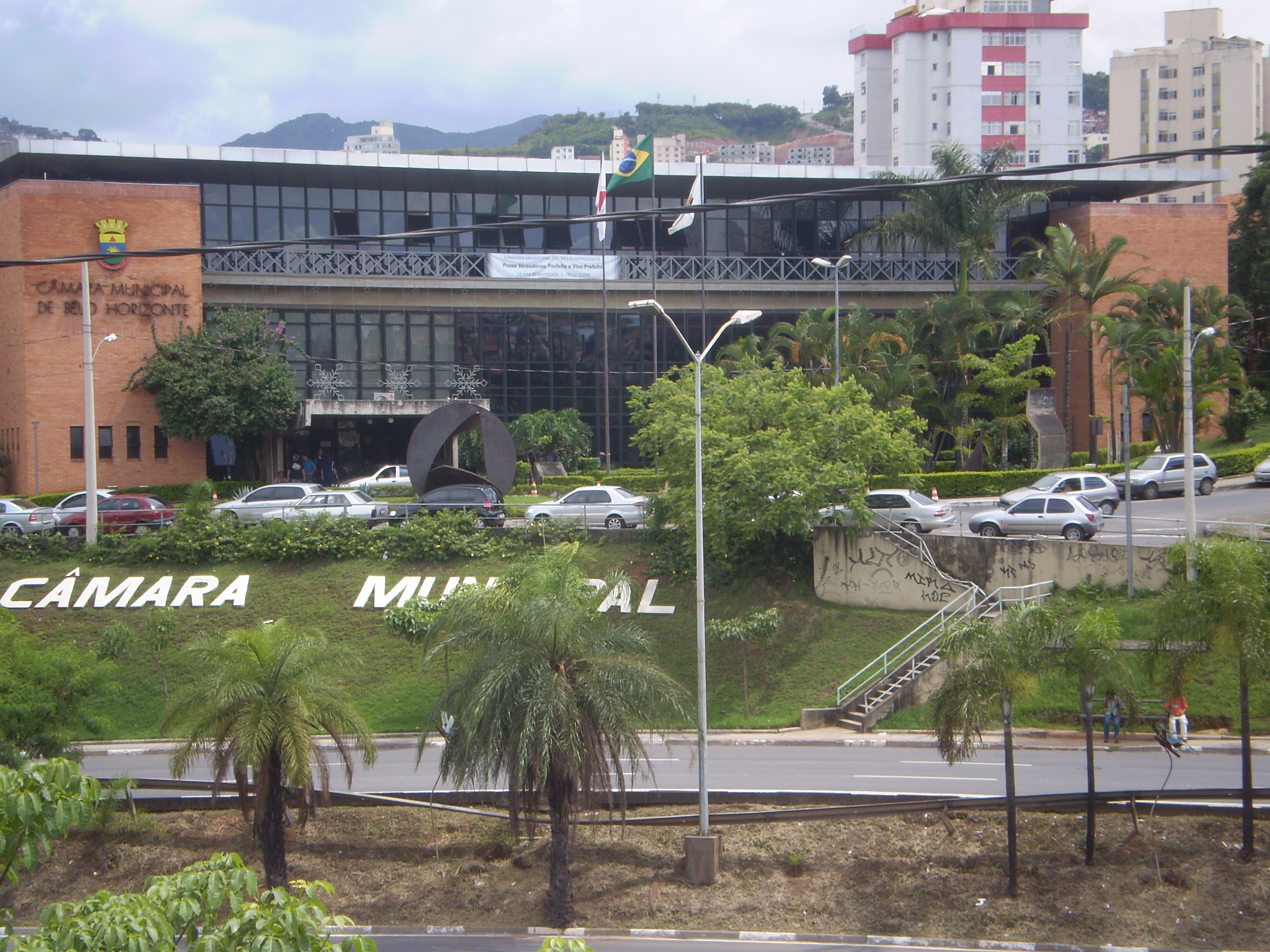
Municipal Chamber building

The Municipal Chamber of Belo Horizonte is the legislative body of the government of Belo Horizonte, the capital of the state of Minas Gerais in Brazil.

It is unicameral and is composed of 41 councilors.

== History ==
The city of Belo Horizonte was founded on December 12, 1897. After its creation, the municipality was indirectly governed by the state governor (then president of the state) who personally chose who would be the mayor.

The first legislative body was the Deliberative Council of Belo Horizonte, with its activities started in 1900, which despite its members being chosen directly by popular vote, only discussed and voted on the municipal budget and taxes proposed by the mayor. Initially, the activities of the Deliberative Council were held in a room in the Chamber of Deputies. In 1914, the building on the corner of Rua da Bahia and Avenida Augusto de Lima, now the Fashion Museum, was inaugurated to house the Deliberative Council and the Municipal Public Library.

In 1930, after the 1930 Revolution, the Deliberative Council was closed. With the 1934 Constitution, the opening of legislative houses was once again allowed, which would only be opened in 1936 in Belo Horizonte, with more powers to deal with local affairs. With the installation of the Estado Novo in 1937, the legislative bodies were once again closed through the new Constitution of 1937.

The 1946 constitution determined the reopening of municipal legislative bodies and in 1947 the Municipal Chamber of Belo Horizonte began operating. During the military regime, the chamber had its functions reduced, but not extinguished. It remained at its headquarters on Rua da Bahia until 1977, when it was transferred to the then-Francisco Bicalho Palace, on Rua dos Tamoios. In 1988, it was relocated to the current headquarters, which are at 3100 Avenida dos Andradas.

== Structure ==
The chamber is made up of 41 councilors, divided between the Board of Directors, the General Directorate, the Institutional Communication Superintendence, the Human Resources Directorate, the Administration and Finance Directorate, and the Legislative Directorate.

== Members (2021-2024) ==
- UNIÃO Álvaro Damião
- UNIÃO Léo
- PSOL Bella Gonçalves
- PSOL Iza Lourença
- AVANTE Bim da Ambulância
- AVANTE Juninho Los Hermanos
- AVANTE Professor Claudiney Dulim
- NOVO Braulio Lara
- NOVO Fernanda Pereira Altoé
- NOVO Marcela Trópia
- PDT Bruno Miranda
- PDT Duda Salabert
- PDT Miltinho CGE
- PTB Ciro Pereira
- PSD Cláudio do Mundo Novo
- PSD Helinho da Farmácia
- PSD Fernando Luiz
- PSD Ramon Bibiano da Casa de Apoio
- PSC Dr. Célio Frois
- PP Marcos Crispim
- PP Flávia Borja
- PP José Ferreira
- PP Professora Marli
- PP Wesley
- PP Wilsinho da Tabu
- PP Rogerio Alkimim
- PP Rubão
- PL Nikolas Ferreira
- PL Walter Tosta
- REPUBLICANOS Jorge Santos
- PATRI Irlan Melo
- PATRI Wanderley Porto
- CIDADANIA Marilda Portela
- PSDB Henrique Braga
- PODE Nely Aquino
- PT Pedro Patrus
- PT Macaé Evaristo
- AGIR Professor Juliano Lopes
- REDE Gilson Guimarães
- MDB Reinaldo Gomes Preto Sacolão
- Without party Gabriel
