= Bruno Engler =

Brazilian politician

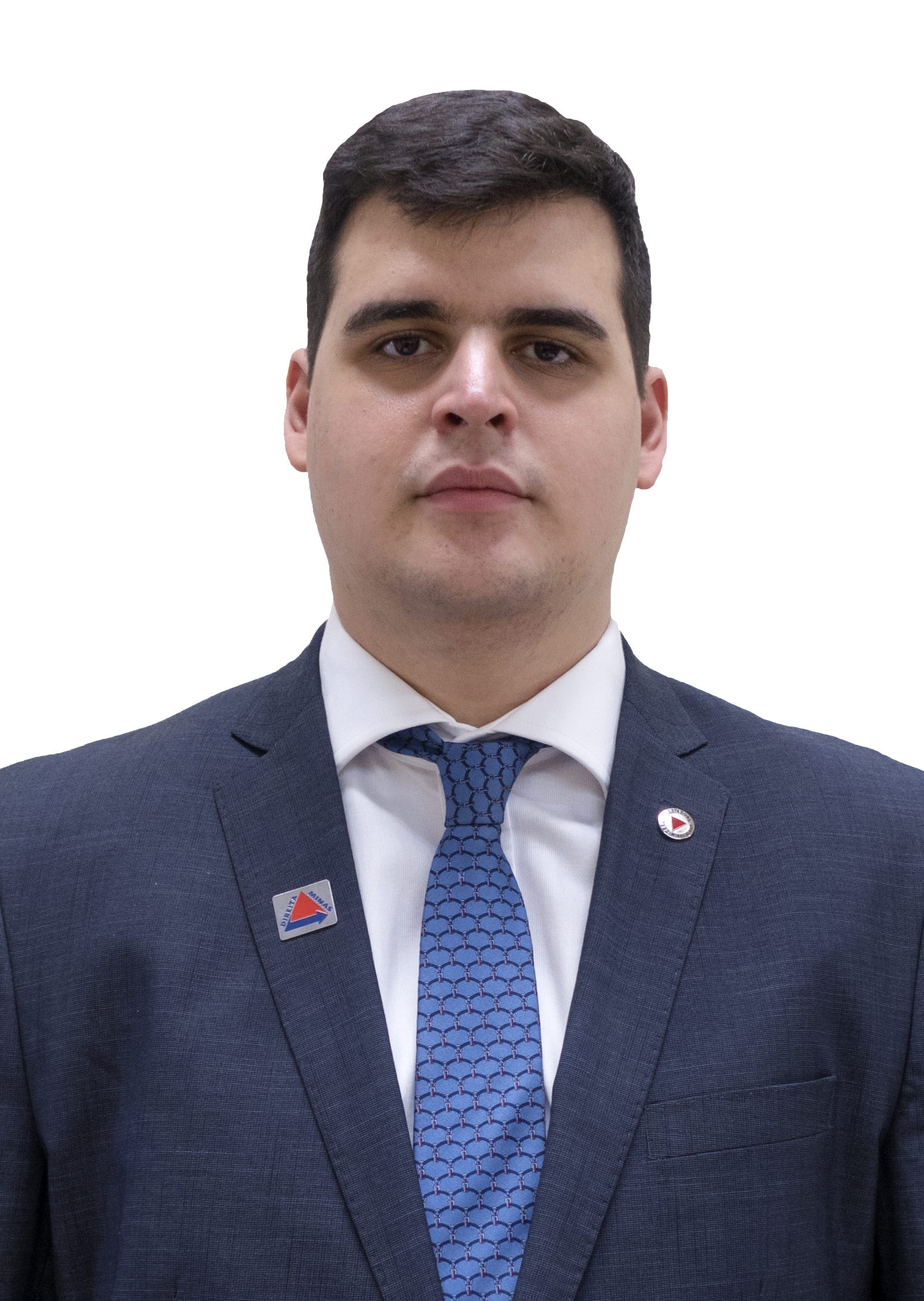

State Deputy of Minas Gerais
- Incumbent
- Assumed office 1 February 2019

Personal details
- Born: Bruno de Castro Engler Florencio de Almeida; 17 June 1997 (age 29) Curitiba, Paraná, Brazil
- Party: PL (2022–present)
- Other political affiliations: PSC (2016–18); PSL (2018–20); PRTB (2020–22)

Bruno de Castro Engler Florencio de Almeida (born in Curitiba, Paraná, on 17 June 1997) is a Brazilian deputy for the state of Minas Gerais. He was elected in 2018. His seat is in Belo Horizonte. He is affiliated with the Liberal Party (PL). He is anti-communist and a friend of conservative president Jair Bolsonaro.
