= Áurea Carolina =

Brazilian politician

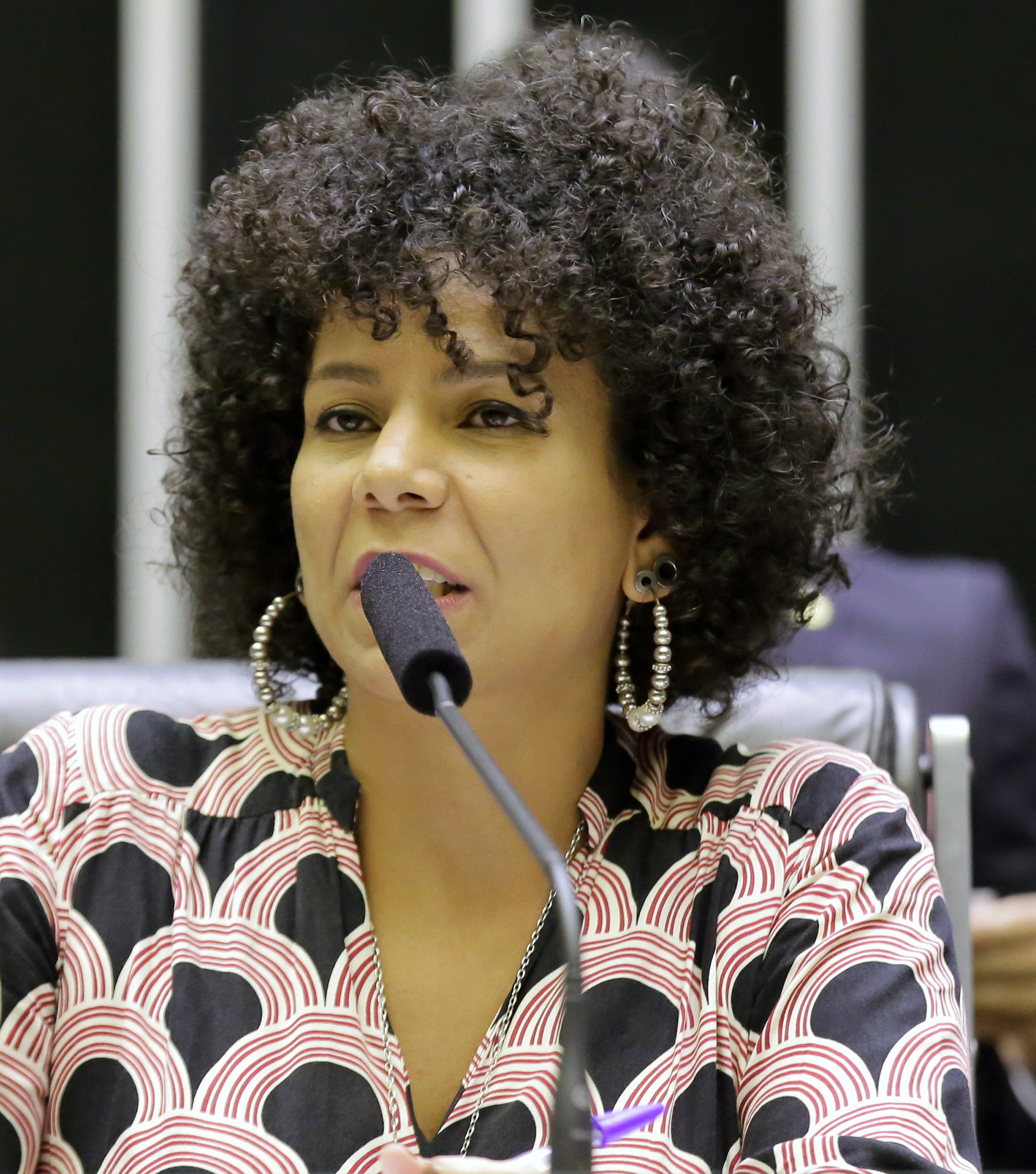
- Carolina in 2019

Federal Deputy from Minas Gerais
- Incumbent
- Assumed office 1 February 2019

City Councillor of Belo Horizonte
- In office 1 January 2017 – 9 November 2018

Personal details
- Born: 20 November 1983 (age 42) Tucuruí, Pará, Brazil
- Party: PSOL (2015–present)
- Education: Federal University of Minas Gerais; Autonomous University of Barcelona
- Profession: Social scientist, political scientist

Áurea Carolina de Freitas e Silva (born 20 November 1983) is a Brazilian politician, political scientist and sociologist. Although born in Pará, she has spent her political career representing Minas Gerais, having served as federal deputy representative since 2019.

== Personal life ==
Carolina holds a degree in social sciences from the Federal University of Minas Gerais, a specialist degree in gender and equality from the Autonomous University of Barcelona, and a master's degree in political science from the Federal University of Minas Gerais.

In March 2019, Carolina was recognized as one of the 100 most influential black Brazilians in politics.

She identifies as an Afro-Brazilian, feminist, and supporter of LGBTQ rights.

== Political career ==
Carolina was the most voted candidate in the 2016 election for the council of Belo Horizonte, receiving 17,420 votes.

Carolina was elected to the federal chamber of deputies in the 2018 election, the fifth most voted candidate in the state of Minas Gerais, with 162,740 votes.
