= Álvaro Damião =

Brazilian sports journalist and politician

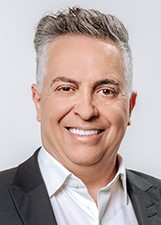
- Damião in 2024

54th Mayor of Belo Horizonte
- Incumbent
- Assumed office 26 March 2025
- Preceded by: Fuad Noman

Vice Mayor of Belo Horizonte
- In office 1 January 2025 – 26 March 2025
- Mayor: Fuad Noman
- Preceded by: Fuad Noman
- Succeeded by: Vacant

Councilman of Belo Horizonte
- In office 1 January 2017 – 31 December 2024

Personal details
- Born: Álvaro Damião Vieira da Paz; 27 September 1970 (age 56) Belo Horizonte, Minas Gerais, Brazil
- Party: PSB (2012–2018); DEM (2018–2022); UNIÃO (2022–present)
- Occupation: Sports journalist, politician

Álvaro Damião Vieira da Paz (born 27 September 1970) is a Brazilian sports journalist and politician who is currently the mayor of Belo Horizonte. After becoming the vice mayor on 1 January 2025, he became the mayor on 26 March 2025, after the death of then-mayor Fuad Noman. He is currently affiliated with Brazil Union (UNIÃO).

== Biography ==
Damião was born and raised in the Concórdia neighborhood of Belo Horizonte. Starting at a young age, he demonstrated an interest in communication. He began his career as a sports journalist, where he built up a career covering a wide array of sporting events, including five FIFA World Cups, two Olympics, three Pan-American Games, and three Copa Américas.

Damião accompanied the main football teams from Minas Gerais, namely América, Atlético and Cruzeiro, on their journeys, along with the Brazil national football team. While on radio, he became known as part of the team at Rádio Itatiaia, becoming one of the most recognized voices in sports journalism in the state of Minas Gerais. On television, he has presented programs such as Alterosa Agora and Bola na Área, both on TV Alterosa, and also had stints with Record Minas.

== Political career ==
While a member of the Brazilian Socialist Party (PSB), Damião began his political career in 2016, when he became a city councilman in Belo Horizonte. As a show of his strong popularity, he was reelected in 2020, this time as part of the Democrats (DEM). During his time as councilor, he was known for initiatives aimed at urban mobility and the promotion of sporting and cultural events in the state capital.

In 2024, he was elected as vice-mayor of Belo Horizonte as part of the ticket headed by Fuad Noman, the candidate from the Social Democratic Party (PSD), who was elected to a term in his own right in the second round. Damião took the lead in the municipal government of Belo Horizonte, starting at the end of 2024 when he was named as Secretary of the municipal government on 27 December. This was confirmed in the Official Publication of the City. The nomination occurred after the exoneration of Anselmo Domingos, who lost the position for giving support to Juliano Lopes, at that point a candidate for city chamber president. Shortly after taking office on 4 January 2025, he would go on to assume the duties of mayor after Noman was hospitalized and went on medical leave. After Noman died on 26 March 2025, Damião assumed the mayoralty.
