= Gabriele =

Gabriele is both a given name and a surname. Notable people with the name include:

== Given name ==
- Gabriele Adinolfi (born 1954), Italian far right ideologue and writer
- Gabriele Adorno (1320–1398), Doge of Genoa
- Gabriele Agnolo (died 1510), Italian architect
- Gabriele Albertini (born 1950), Italian politician
- Gabriele Aldegani (born 1976), Italian footballer
- Gabriele Allegra (1907–1976), Italian Roman Catholic priest and theologian
- Gabriele Altweck (born 1963), German cyclist
- Gabriele Ambrosetti (born 1973), Italian footballer
- Gabriele Ambrosio (1844–1918), Italian sculptor
- Gabriele Amorth (1925–2016), Italian Roman Catholic priest and exorcist
- Gabriele Angella (born 1989), Italian footballer
- Gabriele Annan (1921–2013), British author, and literary and film critic
- Gabriele Antonini (1938–2018), Italian actor
- Gabriele Araudo (born 1974), Italian ice sledge hockey player
- Gabriele Askamp (born 1955), German swimmer
- Gabriele Badorek (born 1952), East German handball player
- Gabriele Balducci (born 1975), Italian cyclist
- Gabriele Barbaro (born 1950), Italian long-distance runner
- Gabriele Bartoletti (born 1984), Italian footballer
- Gabriele Basilico (1944–2013), Italian photographer
- Gabriele von Baumberg (1768–1839), Austrian writer and poet
- Gabriele Becker (born 1975), German sprinter
- Gabriele Bella (1730–1799), Italian Baroque painter
- Gabriele Bellodi (born 2000), Italian footballer
- Gabriele Berg (born 1963), German biologist
- Gabriele Bertaccini (born 1985), Italian chef and television personality
- Gabriele Bianchi (1901–1974), Italian classical composer and conductor
- Gabriele Bongiorni (born 1959), Italian footballer
- Gabriele Bosisio (born 1980), Italian cyclist
- Gabriele Bühlmann (born 1964), Swiss sport shooter
- Gabriele von Bülow (1802–1887), German noblewoman
- Gabriele Buschmeier (1955–2020), German musicologist
- Gabriele Giordano Caccia (born 1958), Italian Roman Catholic archbishop
- Gabriele Caliari (1568–1631), Italian Renaissance painter
- Gabriele Capellini, Italian Renaissance painter
- Gabriele Casalegno (born c. 1923), Italian rugby league and rugby union player
- Gabriele Castagnola (1828–1883), Italian artist
- Gabriele Cattani (born 1950), Italian astronomer
- Gabriele Cioffi (born 1975), Italian footballer
- Gabriele Colombo (born 1972), Italian cyclist
- Gabriele Corbo (born 2000), Italian footballer
- Gabriele Corcos (born 1972), Italian chef
- Gabriele D'Annunzio (1863–1938), Italian writer, poet, journalist and playwright
- Gabriele Dachs, cancer researcher in New Zealand
- Gabriele Dara (1826–1885), Italian politician and writer
- Gabriele Debbia (born 1968), Italian motorcycle racer
- Gabriele de' Gabrielli (1445–1511), Italian Roman Catholic bishop and cardinal
- Gabriele del Grande (born 1982), Italian journalist, blogger and activist
- Gabriele della Genga Sermattei (1801–1861), Italian cardinal
- Gabriele Delli Colli (born 1966), Italian Formula One and motorsport engineer
- Gabriele Dell'Otto (born 1973), Italian illustrator and writer
- Gabriele De Nard (born 1974), Italian long-distance runner
- Gabriele Detti (born 1994), Italian swimmer
- Gabriele Dietrich (born 1943), German-Indian scholar and philosopher
- Gabriele Eckart (born 1954), German writer
- Gabriele Evertz (born 1945), German-born American artist
- Gabriele Fabris (born 1988), Italian footballer
- Gabriele Fähnrich (born 1968), East German gymnast
- Gabriele Faerno (died 1561), Italian writer
- Gabriele Falloppio (1523–1562), Italian anatomist and physician
- Gabriele Ferretti (1795–1860), Italian cardinal
- Gabriele Ferro (born 1988), Italian motorcycle racer
- Gabriele Ferro (conductor) (born 1937), Italian conductor
- Gabriele Ferzetti (1925–2015), Italian actor
- Gabriele Fiamma (died 1585), Italian Roman Catholic bishop
- Gabriele Finaldi (born 1965), British art historian and curator
- Gabriele Fontana (born 1958), Austrian opera singer
- Gabriele Gast (born 1943), East German spy
- Gabriele Grossi (born 1972), Italian footballer
- Gabriele Gardel (born 1977), Swiss racing driver
- Gabriele Gatti (born 1953), Sammarinese politician
- Gabriele Geissler (1944–2006), East German table tennis player
- Gabriele Giolito de' Ferrari (c. 1508–1578), Italian printer
- Gabriele Groneberg (born 1955), German politician
- Gabriele Grunewald (born 1986), American middle-distance runner
- Gabriele Günz (born 1961), East German high jumper
- Gabriele Haefs (born 1953), German writer and translator
- Gabriele Hammelrath (born 1953), German politician
- Gabriele Haupt (born 1942), East German cross-country skier
- Gabriele C. Hegerl (born 1962), climatologist
- Gabriele Heinen-Kljajic (born 1962), German politician
- Gabriele Heinisch-Hosek (born 1961), Austrian politician
- Gabriele Hess (born 1971), German cross-country skier
- Gabriele Hinzmann (born 1947), East German discus thrower
- Gabriele Hirschbichler (born 1983), German speed skater
- Gabriele Hooffacker (born 1959), German journalist
- Gabriele Janke (born 1956), German fencer
- Gabriele Just (born 1936), German chess player
- Gabriele Kaiser, German mathematics educator
- Gabriele Kelm, German rower
- Gabriele Klein (born 1957), German sociologist
- Gabriele Koch (born 1948), German potter
- Gabriele Kohlisch (born 1963), German luger and bobsledder
- Gabriele Köllmann, German slalom canoeist
- Gabriele Kraushofer, Austrian sport shooter
- Gabriele Kröcher-Tiedemann (1951–1995), German urban guerrilla activist
- Gabriele Krone-Schmalz (born 1949), German journalist and writer
- Gabriele Kuby (born 1944), German writer and sociologist
- Gabriele Kühn (born 1957), German rower
- Gabriele Lancieri (born 1975), Italian racing driver
- Gabriele Lavia (born 1942), Italian actor, film director and theatre director
- Gabriele Lesser (born 1960), German historian and journalist
- Gabriele Lösekrug-Möller (born 1951), German politician and former member of the Bundestag
- Gabriele Moreno Locatelli (1959–1993), Italian pacifist
- Gabriele Lorenzo (born 2006), Italian para swimmer
- Gabriele Löwe (born 1958), German sprinter
- Gabriele von Lutzau (born 1954), German hijacking survivor
- Gabriele Magni (born 1973), Italian fencer
- Gabriele Mandel (1924–2010), Italian psychologist, writer and artist
- Gabriele Manfredi (1681–1761), Italian mathematician
- Gabriele Manganaro, American engineer
- Gabriele Marchegiani (born 1996), Italian footballer
- Gabriele Marcotti (born 1973), Italian journalist
- Gabriele Marotta (born 1967), Italian racing driver
- Gabriele Marranci (born 1973), Italian anthropologist
- Gabriele Maruotti (born 1988), Italian volleyball player
- Gabriele Meinel, German cross-country skier
- Gabriele Mehl (born 1967), German rower
- Gabriele Mirabassi (born 1967), Italian jazz clarinetist
- Gabriele Missaglia (born 1970), Italian cyclist
- Gabriele Moncini (born 1996), Italian footballer
- Gabriele Morelli (born 1996), Italian footballer
- Gabriele Morganti (born 1958), Italian footballer and manager
- Gabriele Mucchi (1899–2002), Italian painter
- Gabriele Muccino (born 1967), Italian film director
- Gabriele Münter (1877–1962), German painter
- Gabriele Nasci (1887–1947), Italian general
- Gabriele Nebe (born 1967), German mathematician
- Gabriele Nelli (born 1993), Italian volleyball player
- Gabriele Nissim (born 1950), Italian journalist, historian and writer
- Gabriele Oettingen (born 1953), American psychologist
- Gabriele Oriali (born 1952), Italian footballer
- Gabriele Paleotti (1522–1597), Italian cardinal
- Gabriele Palme (born 1964), German handball player
- Gabriele Paoletti (born 1978), Italian footballer
- Gabriele Paolini (born 1974), Italian television personality
- Gabriele Paonessa (born 1987), Italian footballer
- Gabriele Pauli (born 1957), German politician
- Gabriele Pepe (1779–1849), Italian soldier
- Gabriele Perico (born 1984), Italian footballer
- Gabriele Perthes (born 1948), German swimmer
- Gabriele Pin (born 1962), Italian footballer and manager
- Gabriele Pontangeli (died 1478), Italian Roman Catholic bishop
- Gabriele Ponte (born 1982), Italian DJ
- Gabriele Poso (born 1978), Italian musician
- Gabriele Possanner (1869–1940), Austrian physician
- Gabriele Preuß (born 1954), German politician
- Gabriele Puccio (born 1989), Italian footballer
- Gabriele Rabel (1880–1963), Austrian physicist and botanist
- Gabriele Rangone (died 1486), Italian cardinal
- Gabriele Rauscher (born 1970), German freestyle skier
- Gabriele Reinsch (born 1963), East German discus thrower
- Gabriele Reismüller (1920–1969), German actress
- Gabriele Reuter (1859–1941), German writer
- Gabriele Rohde (1904–1946), Danish League of Nations official
- Gabriele Rolando (born 1995), Italian footballer
- Gabriele Rollnik (born 1950), German terrorist
- Gabriele Rosenthal (born 1954), German sociologist
- Gabriele Rossetti (1783–1854), Italian poet and scholar
- Gabriele Rossetti (sport shooter) (born 1995), Italian sport shooter
- Gabriele Rotermund, German rower
- Gabriele Rubini (born 1983), Italian rugby union player
- Gabriele Rumi (1939–2001), Italian Formula One team owner
- Gabriele Sabatini (born 1976), Italian footballer
- Gabriele Salvatores (born 1950), Italian film director and screenwriter
- Gabriele Salviati (1910–1987), Italian sprinter
- Gabriele Santini (1886–1964), Italian conductor
- Gabriele Schnaut (1951–2023), German opera singer
- Gabriele Schöpe (born 1944), German diver
- Gabriele Schreckenbach, German opera singer
- Gabriele von Schrenck-Notzing (1872–1953), German baroness and aviator
- Gabriele Sella (1963–2010), Italian cyclist
- Gabriele Setario, 16th-century Italian Roman Catholic bishop
- Gabriele Seyfert (born 1948), German figure skater
- Gabriele Sforza (1423–1457), Italian Roman Catholic archbishop
- Gabriele Sima (1955–2016), Austrian opera singer
- Gabriele Simongini (born 1963), Italian art historian and art critic
- Gabriele Smargiassi (1798–1882), Italian painter
- Gabriele Stauner (born 1948), German politician
- Gabriele Tagliaventi (born 1960), Italian architect
- Gabriele Tarquini (born 1962), Italian racing driver
- Gabriele Taylor (born 1927), English philosopher
- Gabriele Tinti (disambiguation), multiple people
- Gabriele Torsello (born 1970), Italian journalist
- Gabriele Tredozi (born 1957), Italian engineer and Formula One designer
- Gabriele Uhlenbruck (born 1965), German field hockey player
- Gabriele Valvassori (1683–1761), Italian Baroque architect
- Gabriele Veneziano (born 1942), Italian theoretical physicist
- Gabriele Vezzosi (born 1968), Italian mathematician
- Gabriele Vianello (1938–2026), Italian basketball player
- Gabriele Volpi (born 1943), Italian-born Nigerian businessman
- Gabriele Wetzko (born 1954), German swimmer
- Gabriele Wohmann (1932–2015), German writer
- Gabriele Wülker (1911–2001), German politician
- Gabriele Wurzel (born 1948), German lawyer and politician
- Gabriele Zeilinger (1917–2011), Austrian fencer
- Gabriele Zerbi (1445–1505), Italian physician
- Gabriele Zerbo (born 1994), Italian footballer
- Gabriele Zimmer (born 1955), German politician

== Surname ==
- Al Gabriele, American comic book artist
- Angel Gabriele (1956–2016), American comic book artist
- Corrado Gabriele (born 1966), Italian politician
- Daniele Gabriele (born 1994), German-Italian footballer
- Fabrizio Gabriele (born 1985), Italian rower
- Ketty Gabriele (born 1981), Italian mobster
- Lisa Gabriele, Canadian writer, television producer and journalist
- Teresa Gabriele (born 1979), Canadian basketball player

== See also ==
- Gabrio, related Italian given name
- Gabrielė, a feminine Lithuanian given name
- Gabriel (disambiguation)
- Gabrielle (disambiguation)
