= Gabriela (given name) =

Gabriela is a feminine given name that appears in Portuguese, Spanish, Czech, Slovak, Romanian, Latvian, Polish and Bulgarian. It is a form of the Hebrew name Gabriel, meaning "God is my strength". Related names include Gabriella, Gabriele, Gabrielė, Gabrielle, Gabi and Gabe.

Notable people with the name include:

== Arts and entertainment ==
- Gabriela Adameșteanu (born 1942), Romanian writer, journalist and translator
- Gabriela Anders (born 1972), Argentine singer and pianist
- Gabriela Avigur-Rotem (born 1946), Argentine–Israeli novelist
- Gabriela Beňačková (born 1947), Slovak opera singer
- Gabriela Böhm (born 1964), Argentinian filmmaker
- Gabriela Brimmer (1947–2000), Mexican writer and activist
- Gabriela Bustelo (born 1962), Spanish novelist and translator
- Monique Gabriela Curnen (born 1970), American actress
- Gabriela Dauerer (born 1958), German painter
- Gabriela Duarte (born 1974), Brazilian actress
- Gabriela Dzuríková (born 1973), Slovak actress
- Gabriela Eibenová (born 1972), Czech opera singer
- Maria Gabriela de Faría Chacón (born 1992), Venezuelan actress and singer
- Gabriela Flores, Argentine actress
- Gabriela Lena Frank (born 1972), American composer and pianist
- Gabriela Frías (born 1971), Mexican journalist and business anchor
- Gabríela Friðriksdóttir (born 1971), Icelandic artist and sculptor
- Gabriela Gunčíková (born 1993), Czech singer
- Gabriela von Habsburg (born 1956), Georgian sculptor and diplomat
- Gabriela Isler (born 1988), Venezuelan beauty pageant titleholder
- Gabriela Kratochvílová (born 1990), Czech model and beauty pageant titleholder
- Gabriela Kownacka (1952–2010), Polish actress
- Gabriela Kulka (born 1979), Polish musician
- Gabriela Loran (born 1993), Brazilian actress
- Gabriela Marcinková (born 1988), Slovak actress
- Gabriela Markus (born 1988), Brazilian model
- Gabriela Medina (actress) (1935–2025), Chilean actress
- Gabriela Míčová (born 1975), Czech actress
- Gabriela Mistral, pseudonym of Lucila Godoy Alcayaga (1889–1957), Chilean poet, educator and diplomat
- Gabriela Montero (born 1970), Venezuelan-American pianist
- Gabriela Moura (born 2004), Brazilian influencer
- Gabriela Moyseowicz (born 1944), Polish composer and pianist
- Gabriela N (born 1993), Maltese singer-songwriter
- Gabriela Osvaldová (born 1953), Czech actress and lyricist
- Gabriela Ortiz (born 1964), Mexican music educator and composer
- Gabriela Preissová (1862–1946), Czech writer and playwright
- Gabriela Scherer (born 1981), Swiss opera singer
- Gabriela Spanic Utrera (born 1973), Venezuelan actress
- Cecilia Gabriela Vera Sandoval (born 1961), Mexican actress
- Gabriela Velasco (1941–2019), Chilean actress and TV presenter
- Gabriela Vergara (born 1974), Venezuelan model and actress
- Gabriela Villalba (born 1985), Ecuadorian singer and actress
- Gabriela Vránová (1939–2018), Czech actress and voice actress
- Gabriela Zapolska (1857–1921), Polish novelist, playwright and actress

== Sports ==
- Gabriela Andersen-Schiess (born 1945), Swiss long-distance runner
- Gabriela Chmelinová (born 1976), Czech tennis player
- Gabriela Chlumecká (born 1975), Czech footballer
- Gabriela Dabrowski (born 1992), Canadian tennis player
- Gabriela Drăgoi (born 1992), Romanian artistic gymnast
- Gabriela Gajanová (born 1999), Slovak middle-distance runner
- Gabriela Grillo (born 1952), German equestrian
- Gabriela Guimarães (born 1994), Brazilian volleyball player
- Gabriela Hanuláková (1957–2024), Slovak track and field athlete
- Gabriela Kouassi (born 1979), French-Ivorian hepathlete
- Gabriela Liz (born 1961), Argentine field hockey player
- Gabriela Marginean (born 1987), Romanian basketball player
- Gabriela Medina (sprinter) (born 1985), Mexican sprinter
- Gabriela Navrátilová (born 1976), Czech tennis player
- Gabriela Ņikitina (born 1994), Latvian swimmer
- Gabriela Orvošová (born 2001), Czech volleyball player
- Gabriela Paz Franco (born 1991), Venezuelan tennis player
- Gabriela Pando (born 1970), Argentine field hockey player
- María Gabriela Pazos (born 1967), Argentine field hockey player
- Gabriela Peeva (born 2010), Bulgarian rhythmic gymnast
- Gabriela Pérez del Solar Cuculiza (born 1968), Peruvian volleyball player
- Gabriela Potorac (born 1973), Romanian artistic gymnast
- Gabriela Jaquez (born 2003), Mexican-American basketball player
- Gabriela Sabatini (born 1970), Argentine tennis player
- Gabriela Sánchez (field hockey) (born 1962), Argentine field hockey player
- Gabriela Satková (born 2001), Czech slalom canoeist
- Gabriela Sedláková (born 1968), Slovak middle-distance runner
- Gabriela Soukalová (born 1989), Czech biathlete and TV presenter
- Gabriela Stacherová (born 1980), Slovak slalom canoer
- Gabriela Svobodová (born 1953), Czech cross country skier
- Gabriela Szabo (born 1975), Romanian track and field athlete
- Gabriela Traykova (born 2010), Bulgarian rhythmic gymnast
- Gabriela Trușcă (born 1957), Romanian artistic gymnast and coach

== Other ==
- Gabriela Basařová (1934–2019), Czech chemist
- Gabriela Crețu (born 1965), Romanian politician
- Gabriela Cuevas Barron (born 1979), Mexican politician
- Gabriela Dudeková (born 1968), Slovak historian
- Gabriela Konevska-Trajkovska (1971–2010), Macedonian politician
- Gabriela Masłowska (born 1950), Polish politician
- Gabriela Ngirmang (1922–2007), Palauan activist
- Gabriela Pană Dindelegan (born 1942), Romanian linguist
- Gabriela Parra-Olea (born 1967), Mexican herpetologist
- Gabriela Rosa (born 1966), American politician
- Gabriela Rothmayerová (born 1951), Slovak writer and politician
- Gabriela Shalev (born 1941), Israeli jurist
- Gabriela Silang (1731–1763), Filipino military leader

== See also ==
- Yoko Kanno, formerly also known under pseudonym Gabriela Robin (born 1963), Japanese composer
- The Cheeky Girls, Romanian pop music duo formed with Gabriela and Monica Irimia
