= Gaby =

Gaby is a unisex given name, often short for Gabrielle, Gabriella or Gabriel.

Gaby may refer to:

== Women ==
- Gaby Aghion (1921–2014), French fashion designer and founder of the fashion house Chloé
- Gaby Espino (born 1977), Venezuelan actress and model
- Gaby Hoffmann (born 1982), American actress
- Gaby Hoffmann (songwriter), songwriter (under the pseudonym Deaffy) and former manager of the heavy metal band Accept
- Gaby Lewis (born 2001), Irish cricketer
- Gabriela Pérez del Solar, Peruvian volleyball player, publicist and politician
- Gaby Roslin (born 1964), British presenter
- Gabrielle van Zuylen (1933–2010), French garden designer and garden writer
- Gaby Wood (born 1971), English journalist and literary critic

== Men ==
- Gaby Canizales (born 1960), American former welterweight boxing world champion
- Gaby Charroux (born 1942), French politician
- Gaby Colebunders (born 1972), Belgian politician
- Gaby Layoun (born 1964), Lebanese politician
- Gaby Mudingayi (born 1981), Belgian footballer
- Gaby Sánchez (born 1983), American Major League Baseball player

== Stage name ==
- Gaby (singer), Panamanian Reggae en Español and Reggaeton singer and rapper Winston Alfaro Brown Jr. (born 1965)
- Gabriel Aragón (1920–1995), Spanish clown better known as Gaby
- Gaby Deslys (1881–1920), French dancer, singer and actress born Marie-Elise-Gabrielle Caire

== See also ==
- Gabby (disambiguation)
