= Gabriella (given name) =

- Gender: feminine
- Name day: January 26

Origin
- Origin: Hebrew
- Meaning: "God is my strength" or "strong woman of God"

Other names
- Related names: Gabriela, Gabriele, Gabrielė, Gabrielle, Gabriel, Gabe, Brie, Gabbie, Gabb, Gab, Ellie, Gabs, Gabi , Gabby

Gabriella is a feminine given name used in various languages. Its English spelling originates as an Italian feminine given name from the Hebrew name Gabriel. Girls who are named Gabriella often take on a shorter version of the name, such as Bella, Ella, Gab, Gabby, Gabbie and Gabbi.

== List of people with the given name Gabriella ==
=== Entertainment ===
- Gabriella Leigh Bechtel (born 1997), known professionally as Gabbriette, American model and musician
- Gabriella Brum (born 1960), German model who won the 1980 Miss World beauty pageant
- Gabriella Charlton, reality television personality and actress who works in Tamil-language television and film
- Gabriella Cilmi (born 1991), Australian-Italian singer based in Melbourne
- Gabriella Cristiani (born 1950), Italian film editor who won the 1987 Academy Award for Best Film Editing
- Gabriella Ferri (1942–2004), Italian singer whose self-titled album was released in 1970
- Gabriella Gatehouse (born 1994), Brazilian-British model and beauty queen
- Gabriella Gatti (1908–2003), Italian operatic soprano
- Gabriella Giorgelli (born 1942), Italian film actress
- Gabriella Halikas, American model
- Gabriella Hall (born 1966) (aka Gabriella Skye and Laura Saldivar), model and actress
- Gabriella Hámori (born 1978), Hungarian actress
- Gabriella Henderson, known as Ella Henderson (born 1996), English singer
- Gabriella Leon (born 1996), English actress
- Gabriella Licudi (1941–2022), Moroccan-born British former actress
- Gabriella Mann (born 1995), Swedish fashion model, auditor and beauty pageant titleholder who was crowned Miss Earth Sweden 2020
- Gabriella Martinelli, Italian-Canadian film and television producer
- Gabriella Pallotta (born 1938), Italian film actress
- Gabriella Pession (born 1977), Italian actress
- Gabriella Tóth (born 1988), Hungarian singer
- Gabriella Tucci (1929–2020), Italian operatic soprano
- Gabriella Wilde (born 1989), British actress
- Gabriella Wright (born 1982), English actress and model

=== Literature and art ===
- Gabriella Ambrosio (born 1954), Italian author and former journalist
- Gabriella Belli (born 1952), Italian art historian
- Gabriella Csire (born 1938), Hungarian children's literature author
- Gabriella Demczuk, Lebanese-American artist and documentary photographer
- Gabriella Goliger, Canadian novelist and short story writer who published books in 2001 and 2010
- Gabriella Håkansson (born 1968), Swedish novelist
- Gabriella Porpora (born 1942), Italian painter who co-founded the Gruppo 12 art movement

=== Science ===
- Gabriella Conti Armellini (1891-1974), Italian astronomer
- Gabriella Pinzari, Italian mathematician
- Gabriella Tarantello (born 1958), Italian mathematician

=== Sports ===
- Gabriella Bigler (born 2008), American pararower
- Gabriella Coradine (born 2005), Brazilian rhythmic gymnast
- Gabriella Csapó-Fekete (born 1954), Hungarian volleyball player
- Gabriella Dorio (born 1957), Italian runner and 1984 Olympic gold medal winner
- Gabriella Fagundez (born 1985), Swedish swimmer who holds several national records
- Gabriella Gáspár (born 1979), Hungarian former handballer
- Gabriella Kain (born 1981), Swedish team handball goalkeeper
- Gabriella Kindl (born 1979), Hungarian and Montenegrin handball player
- Gabriella Lengyel (born 1960), Hungarian volleyball player
- Gabriella Mészáros (1913–1994), Hungarian gymnast
- Gabriella Papadakis (born 1995) French ice dancer who won a silver medal at the 2018 Winter Olympics
- Gabriella Paruzzi (born 1969), retired Italian cross-country skier who competed from 1991 to 2006
- Gabriela Sabatini (born 1970) Argentinian former world class tennis player in 1980’s and 90’s.
- Gabriella Silva (born 1988), Brazilian butterfly swimmer and model
- Gabriella Smith (swimmer) (born 2006), New Zealand para swimmer
- Gabriella Szabó (born 1975), Romanian runner
- Gabriella Szabó (born 1986), Hungarian sprint canoeist who won a silver medal at the 2008 Summer Olympics
- Gabriella Szűcs (born 1984), Hungarian team handball player
- Gabriella Szűcs (water polo) (born 1988), Hungarian water polo player
- Gabriella Tóth (footballer) (born 1986), Hungarian football midfielder
- Gabriella Wood (born 1997), Trinidadian international level judoka

=== Religion, politics, royalty and history ===
- Blessed Sister Maria Gabriella Sagheddu (1914–1939), Italian Trappist nun
- Gabriella Selmeczi (born 1965), Hungarian jurist and politician
- Princess Maria Gabriella of Savoy (born 1940), daughter of Italy's last king, and an historian
- Lady Gabriella Windsor (born 1981) (aka Ella Windsor), English journalist and a member of the British Royal Family
- Princess Gabriella, Countess of Carladès (born 2014), second in line to the Monegasque throne
- Gabriella Romero, American politician

=== Business ===
- Gabriella Meister, German billionaire businesswoman

== Fictional characters ==
- Gabriella, deaf-mute Latina mermaid in episodes of the 1992–1994 Little Mermaid animated TV series
- Gabriella, a fictional character from the animated preschool TV series Sid the Science Kid
- Gabriella Dante, character in the 1999–2007 cable TV series The Sopranos
- Gabriella Einarsdotter, fictional character in the Bert Diaries series of books
- Gabriella Espinosa, a fictional character from the animated TV series Big City Greens
- Gabriella Montez, character in the 2006–2008 Disney channel High School Musical movie series

== See also ==
- Gabbi
- Gabriela (given name)
- Gabrielle (given name)
- Gabriel (given name)
