= Gabrielle (given name) =

- Pronunciation: gæ-bree-elle
- Gender: Feminine

Origin
- Origin: Hebrew
- Meaning: "able-bodied one of God"; or "messenger of God"

Other names
- Short forms: Gabby, Gab, Gabs, Brie, Gabbs, Gabi, Gaby, Brielle, Rielle, Gabgab, Belle, Bella, Gia, Elle, Ellie, Lily
- Related names: Gabriel, Gabriele, Gabrielė, Gabriela, Gabriella, Gabie, Gabby, Gaby, Gabi, Gabbie, Gabe

Gabrielle is the French feminine form of the given name Gabriel (Hebrew: גַבְרִיאֵל) which translates to "God is my strong man".

== People with the given name Gabrielle ==
- Gabrielle (singer) (born 1969), English singer
- Gabrielle Alioth (born 1955), Swiss author
- Gabrielle Andrews (born 1996), American tennis player
- Gabrielle Anwar (born 1970), English actress
- Gabrielle Aplin (born 1992), English singer-songwriter
- Gabrielle Armstrong-Scott, New Zealand platform diver
- Gabrielle Asset Brieger (1905–2003), American scientist
- Gabrielle-Suzanne Barbot de Villeneuve (1695–1755), French author
- Gabrielle Beaumont (1942–2022), British film and television director
- Gabrielle Bell (born 1976), British-born American alternative cartoonist
- Gabrielle Bellocq (1920–1999), French artist
- Gabrielle Bertrand (1923–1999), Canadian politician
- Gabrielle Blunt (1919–2014), English actress
- Gabrielle Borthwick (1866–1952), British motorist and mechanic
- Gabrielle Bossis (1874–1950), French nun
- Gabrielle Bou Rached (born 1985), Lebanese model and actress
- Gabrielle Brady, Australian filmmaker
- Gabrielle Brooks (born 1990), English actress
- Gabrielle Brune (1912–2005), English actress
- Gabrielle Carey (1959–2023), Australian writer
- Gabrielle Carteris (born 1961), American actress
- Coco Chanel, Gabrielle Bonheur Chanel, (1883–1971), French fashion designer
- Gabrielle Christian (born 1984), American actress and singer
- Gabrielle Colonna-Romano (1888–1981), French stage and film actress
- Gabrielle Daleman (born 1998), Canadian figure skater
- Gabrielle David (born 1999), Canadian ice hockey player
- Gabrielle Daye (1911–2005), English television and film actress
- Gabrielle Destroismaisons (born 1982), Canadian singer
- Gabrielle Dorziat (1880–1979), French stage and film actress
- Gabby Douglas, Gabrielle Douglas (born 1995), American gymnast and Olympian
- Gabrielle Drake (born 1944), British actress
- Gabrielle Enthoven (1868-1950), English playwright
- Gabrielle d'Estrées (1573–1599), French mistress of King Henry IV of France
- Gabrielle Ferrari (1851–1921), French-Italian pianist and composer
- Gabrielle Fitzpatrick (born 1967), Australian film and television actress
- Gabrielle "Rosey" Flecher (born 1975), American Olympic snowboarder
- Gabrielle Fontan (1873–1959), French stage and film actress
- Gabrielle Gachet (born 1980), Swiss ski mountaineer
- Gabby Giffords (born 1970), American politician
- Gabrielle Glaister (born 1960), English actress
- Gabrielle Gutierrez (born 2005), American actress
- Gabrielle Hanna, known as Gabbie Hanna (born 1991), American Internet personality, author, singer-songwriter and actress
- Gabrielle Hardie (born 2009), American gymnast
- Gabrielle Harrison (born 1964), Australian politician
- Gabrielle Huria (born 1962), New Zealand Māori leader
- Gabrielle Kirk McDonald (born 1942), American lawyer and jurist
- Gabrielle Jeffery (1886–1940), British suffragist and founder of the Catholic Women's Suffrage Society
- Gabrielle Kirk McDonald (born 1942), American lawyer and jurist
- Gabrielle Lamb, American dancer and choreographer
- Gabrielle Lambert (born 1993), Canadian soccer player
- Gabrielle Lazure (born 1967), American-Canadian actress
- Gabrielle LeDoux (born 1948), American politician
- Gabrielle Léger (1916–1998), Canadian wife of the 21st Governor General of Canada, Jules Léger
- Gabrielle Leithaug (born 1985), Norwegian pop singer
- Gabrielle Lester, English classical violinist and orchestra leader
- Gabrielle Logan, known as Gabby Logan (born 1973), English TV presenter and former gymnast
- Gabrielle Lord (born 1946), Australian crime writer
- Gabrielle Louis-Carabin (born 1946) Guadeloupe politician and member of the National Assembly of France
- Gabrielle Lutz (1935–2011), French slalom and sprint canoer
- Gabrielle Miller (born 1973), Canadian actress
- Gabrielle Miller (Australian actress) (born 1986), Australian actress
- Gabrielle Onguene (born 1989), Cameroonian footballer, Olympic athlete
- Gabrielle Patterson (1905–1968) British aviator in Air Transport Auxiliary, Britain's first woman flying instructor
- Gabrielle Petit (1893–1916), Belgian spy for the British Secret Service during WWI
- Gabrielle Petit (feminist) (1860–1952), French feminist activist, anticlerical, libertarian socialist, newspaper editor
- Gabrielle Petito (1999–2021), American crime victim
- Gabrielle Pizzi (1940–2004), Australian art dealer
- Gabrielle Radziwill (1877–1968), Lithuanian noblewoman, nurse, and women's rights activist
- Gabrielle Ray (1883–1973), English stage actress, dancer and singer
- Gabrielle Reece (born 1970), American professional volleyball player and model
- Gabrielle Réjane (1856–1920), French stage and film actress
- Gabrielle Renard (1878-1959), French nanny
- Gabrielle Renaudot Flammarion (1877–1962), French astronomer
- Gabrielle Réval (1869-1938), French novelist, essayist
- Gabrielle Richens (born 1974), English model and television personality
- Gabrielle Robinne (1886–1980), French stage and film actress
- Gabrielle de Rochechouart de Mortemart, (1633–1693), Marchioness of Thianges and French noblewoman
- Gabrielle Rose (actress) (born 1954), Canadian actress
- Gabrielle Rose (swimmer) (born 1977), American-Brazilian freestyle, medley and breaststroke swimmer and Olympic athlete
- Gabrielle Elizabeth Frances Ross (born 1975), British fashion designer and businesswoman
- Gabrielle Roth (1941–2012), American dancer, author and musician
- Gabrielle Roy (1909–1983), Canadian author
- Gabrielle Scollay (born 1990) Australian actress
- Gabrielle Soumet (1814-1886), French dramatist, poet, and feminist writer
- Gabrielle M. Spiegel (born 1943), American professor, historian of medieval France
- Gabrielle Stanton (born 1968), American television producer and screenwriter
- Gabrielle Stebbins, American politician from Vermont
- Gabrielle Suchon (1631–1703), French moral philosopher and Catholic feminist
- Gabrielle Tana, British film producer
- Gabrielle Tayac, American historian and curator
- Gabrielle Thomas (born 1996), American sprinter
- Gabrielle Union (born 1972), American actress
- Gabrielle Upton (born 1964), Australian politician
- Gabrielle Upton (screenwriter) (1921–2022), Canadian-born American screenwriter and actress
- Gabrielle Vernier (born 1997), French rugby player
- Gabrielle Walcott (born 1984), Trinidad and Tobago model and beauty pageant contestant
- Gabrielle Walsh (born 1989), American actress
- Gabrielle Weidner (1914–1945), Dutch resistance fighter who played active role in the French Resistance movement during the World War II
- Gabrielle West (born 1985), American actress
- Gabrielle Williams, Australian politician
- Gabrielle Williams (1963–2023), Australian writer
- Gabrielle Wittkop, French writer and translator
- Gabrielle Wodnil (1880–1933), British novelist and songwriter
- Gabrielle Wolohojian (born 1960), American judge
- Gabrielle Wortman (born 1989), American rock musician
- Gabrielle Zevin (born 1977), American author and screenwriter
- Gabrielle van Zuylen (1933–2010), French garden designer and garden writer

=== Fictional characters ===
- Gabrielle, from the television series Sesame Street
- Gabrielle, from the television series Xena: Warrior Princess
- Gabrielle Delacour, Fleur Delacour's sister in the Harry Potter series
- Gabrielle de Lioncourt, Lestat de Lioncourt's mortal mother and vampire daughter
- Gabrielle Jacobs, from the television series Shortland Street
- Gabrielle Solis, one of the housewives from the Desperate Housewives series
