= Porpora (surname) =

Porpora is an Italian surname. Notable people with this surname include:

- Francesco Antonio Porpora (1575–1640), Italian Roman Catholic prelate
- Gabriella Porpora (born 1942), Italian artist
- Kenny Porpora (born either 1986 or 1987), American author
- Nicola Porpora (1686–1768), Italian composer
- Mauro Porpora (born 1969), Italian paralympic athlete
- Paolo Porpora (1617–1673), Italian painter

== See also ==
- Donato Porpora, a major antagonist in Tokyo Ghoul
