= Gaby (disambiguation) =

Gaby is a unisex given name. It may also refer to:

- Gaby, Aosta Valley, an Italian comune (municipality)
- Gabriela Mistral mine, also known as Gaby, a copper mine in Chile's Atacama Desert
- Île Gaby, an island in the Kerguelen islands, France
- 1665 Gaby, an asteroid
- Gaby (film), a 1956 film by Curtis Bernhardt

== See also ==
- Gabbie or Gabby, another given name
- Gabby (film series), a 1940-1941 American animated cartoon series and the title character
- Gabi (disambiguation)
- Gabbie Stadium, Sydney, Australia, a sports stadium
