= Manganaro =

Manganaro may refer to:

- Manganaro's
- Aldo Manganaro, Italian athlete
- Gabriele Manganaro, American engineer
