= Gabrielle =

Gabrielle may refer to:

- Gabrielle (given name), a French female given name derived from Gabriel

== Film and television ==
- Gabrielle (1954 film), a Swedish film directed by Hasse Ekman
- Gabrielle (2005 film), a French film directed by Patrice Chéreau
- Gabrielle (2013 film), a Canadian film directed by Louise Archambault
- Gabrielle (Xena: Warrior Princess), a character in the television series Xena: Warrior Princess
- Gabrielle (TV series), a daytime talk show

== Music ==
- Gabrielle (singer) (born 1969), English singer
  - Gabrielle (album), her self-titled second album
- "Gabrielle" (Hootenanny Singers song), song by Hootenanny Singers, 1964
- "Gabrielle" (Johnny Hallyday song), 1976
- Gabrielle Leithaug (born 1985), Norwegian X Factor contestant and singer known as Gabrielle
- "Gabrielle", a 1980 single by The Nips
- "Gabrielle", a 2020 single by Brett Eldredge
- "Gabrielle", a song from the album Nymphetamine by Cradle of Filth
- "Gabrielle", a song from the album Love Me for a Reason by The Osmonds
- "Gabrielle", a song from the album Shinola, Vol. 1 by Ween

== Others ==
- Tropical Storm Gabrielle (disambiguation)
- Gabrielle, a temporary nickname for Dysnomia, the moon of the dwarf planet Eris
- Gabrielle, an 1849 play by Émile Augier

== See also ==
- Gabriel (disambiguation)
- Gabriele, a given name and surname
