= Grabbi =

Grabbi is an Italian surname. Notable people with the surname include:

- Corrado Grabbi (born 1975), Italian footballer
- Giuseppe Grabbi (1901–1970), Italian footballer

== See also ==
- Gabbi
