= Sociedad Gabriela Mistral =

Women's organisation that campaigned for women's suffrage in Guatemala

Sociedad Gabriela Mistral (Gabriela Mistral Society), was a women's organization in Guatemala, founded in 1925. It is known for the role it played in the campaign for women's suffrage.

During the Second Federal Republic of Central America June 1921 and January 1922, women's suffrage was introduced on 9 September 1921, however the reform became moot when the Federal Republic of Central America was dissolved not long after.

The Sociedad Gabriela Mistral was founded to campaign for women's rights, and named after Gabriela Mistral. It was founded by a woman who was denied the right to study at the university, and initially worked for women's rights to university education. The Sociedad succeeded with its campaign to achieve women's access to university in Guatemala. The Sociedad continued addressing other women's issues, initially educational, professional, and finally campaigning for women's suffrage.
