= Brielle (given name) =

- Gender: Feminine

Origin
- Origin: English
- Meaning: Short form of Gabrielle

Other names
- Related names: Gabriel, Gabrielle

Brielle is a modern English feminine given name, a short form of the French name Gabrielle.

== Popularity ==
The name is increasing in popularity in the United States. It has ranked among the top 1,000 names in the United States since 1991, among the top 500 names since 2004, and among the top 200 names since 2010. It was the 99th most popular given name for American girls in 2020 and the 118th name for girls in 2021.

== People with the given name ==
- Brielle Davis (born 1984), an Australian recording artist
- Brielle Von Hugel, a contestant on American Idol

== Others ==
- Aparna Brielle (born 1994), an American actress
- Gianna Brielle Perez (known as Gigi Perez; born 2000), an American singer-songwriter

== Fictional characters ==
- Brielle Brooks (Bloodline), a Marvel Comics character and the daughter of Blade
