= Eugen Šváb =

Slovak swing musician (1936–2024)

- Also known as: Šaci
- Born: 26 November 1934; Gelnica, Czechoslovakia
- Died: 29 February 2024 (aged 89); Cologne, North Rhine-Westphalia, Germany
- Genres: Swing
- Instrument(s): Voice, percussions

Eugen Šváb (26 November 1934 – 29 February 2024) was a Slovak swing singer and percussionist.

== Biography ==
Eugen Šváb was born 26 November 1934 in Gelnica. He family was of German ancestry. After the World War II, the family moved to Košice, where his father worked as a court clerk and young Eugen apprenticed in industrial design.

Already as a teenager, Šváb played at weddings and celebrations with a band consisting of his fellow apprentices. Over the course of the 1950s and 1960s Šváb, better known under the pseudonym Šaci, became established among the most visible swing artists in Slovakia, performing both solo and with other musicians.

During the Prague Spring, Šváb received an offer to perform in Finland, however his flight was cancelled after the closing of borders following the Warsaw Pact invasion of Czechoslovakia. Šváb managed to leave the country via train to Vienna and travel to Finland, where he was joined by his wife and younger daughter. His older daughter, however, had to stay behind with his parents and following the family's emigration to West Germany, she became separated from her sibling and parents for decades. Šváb was sentenced in absence to five years in jail for emigrating without a permit.

In Germany, Šváb worked as a designer for the Ford Motor Company and put his music career on hold. Following the Velvet Revolution, Šváb divided his time between Germany and Slovakia, where he recorded several albums and performed nearly until his death. In 2016 he co-authored his autobiography Nič nie je náhodou (Nothing happens by accident).

Šváb died in Cologne on 29 February 2024, at the age of 87.
