= Gabby =

Gabby is a given name, usually a short form of Gabriel or Gabrielle or Gabriella.

Gabby or Gabbie may refer to:

== People ==
=== Actors ===
- Gabby Concepcion (born 1964), Filipino actor and businessman
- Gabby Eigenmann (born 1978), Filipino actor, singer, host and model
- George "Gabby" Hayes (1885–1969), American actor
- Gabby Millgate, Australian actress, writer and comedian
- Gabourey Sidibe (born 1983), American actress and author
- Gabby West (born 1985), American actress

=== Athletes ===
==== Baseball players ====
- Gabby Hartnett (1900–1972), American professional baseball player and manager
- Gabby Kemp (1919–1993), American Negro league second baseman and manager
- Gabby Street (1882–1951), American catcher, manager, coach, and radio broadcaster

==== Footballers ====
- Gabriel Agbonlahor (born 1986), English former professional footballer
- Gabby Collingwood (born 1999), Australian rules footballer
- Gabby George (born 1997), English women's footballer
- Gabby Kessler (born 1994), American former soccer player
- Gabby McGill (born 2000), English footballer
- Gabby Newton (born 2001), Australian rules footballer
- Gabby Seymour (born 1996), Australian rules footballer
- Gabriela Villagrand (born 1999), American-born Panamanian footballer

==== Gymnasts ====
- Gabby Douglas (born 1995), American artistic gymnast
- Gabrielle Jupp (born 1997), British artistic gymnast
- Gabby Logan (born 1973), British presenter and former international rhythmic gymnast
- Gabby May (born 1993), Canadian artistic gymnast
- Gabby Perea (born 2002), American artistic gymnast

==== Other athletes ====
- Gabby Adcock (born 1990), English badminton player
- Gabrielle Andrews (born 1996), American tennis player
- Gabby DeLoof (born 1996), American swimmer
- Gabby Espinas (born 1982), Filipino basketball player
- Gabbie Hughes (born 1999), American ice hockey player
- Gabbie Marshall (born 2000), American former college basketball player
- Gabby Marshall (born 1996), English netball player
- Gabby Mayo (born 1989), American sprinter
- Gabby O'Sullivan (born 1994), Australian rules footballer and basketball player
- Gabbie Plain (born 1998), Australian former All-American college softball pitcher
- Gabby Price (born 1949), American football player and coach
- Gabrielle Reece (born 1970), American professional volleyball player, sports announcer, fashion model and actress
- Gabrielle Sinclair (born 1993), Australian netball player
- Gabby Sullivan (born 1998), New Zealand cricketer
- Gabby Sutcliffe (born 2002), Australian cricketer
- Gabrielle Thomas (born 1996), American sprinter
- Gabby Traxler (born 1998), Canadian racing cyclist
- Gabby Williams (born 1996), American-French basketball player

=== Artists and entertainers ===
==== Musicians ====
- Gabby Abularach, American musician
- Gabby Alipe, vocalist and guitarist with the Filipino rock band Urbandub
- Gabby Barrett (born 2000), American country music singer and songwriter
- Gabby La La (born 1979), vocalist and multi-instrumentalist
- Gabby Glaser, musician with the alternative rock/rap-rock group Luscious Jackson
- Gabbie Hanna (born 1991), American influencer, singer-songwriter, and former YouTuber
- Gabbie Nolen (born 1982), American country music singer-songwriter
- Gabby Pahinui (1921–1980), slack-key guitarist and singer of Hawaiian music
- Mighty Gabby (born 1948), Barbadian calypsonian and folk singer

==== Other artists and entertainers ====
- Gabby O'Connor (born 1974), Australian installation artist
- Gabby Revilla (born 1982), film producer
- Gabby Rivera, American writer and storyteller

=== Businesspeople and politicians ===
- Gabby Giffords (born 1970), American politician and gun control advocate
- Gabby Levy (born 1945), Israeli diplomat
- Eugenio Lopez III (born 1952), Filipino-American businessman
- Mark Lopez (Filipino executive) (born 1972), chairman of ABS-CBN Corporation
- Gabby Nsiah Nketiah (born 1943), Ghanaian businessman and politician

=== Other people ===
- Gabby Chaves (born 1993), Colombian-American racing driver
- Guy Gabaldon (1926–2006), United States Marine
- Gabby Gabreski (1919–2002), Polish-American career pilot in the United States Air Force
- Gabby Petito (1999–2021), American vlogger murdered by her fiancé
- Gabby Westbrook-Patrick (born 1996), New Zealand-born Australian model

== Fictional characters ==
- Gabby Gabby, from the Toy Story franchise
- Gabby Gator, an animated cartoon character in several cartoons produced by Walter Lantz
- Gabby Goat, an animated cartoon character in the Warner Bros. Looney Tunes series of cartoons'
- Gabby Sharpe, fictional character from the British Channel 4 soap opera, Hollyoaks
- Gabby Thomas, fictional character from the British ITV soap opera, Emmerdale
- Gabby Girl, the main protagonist of Gabby's Dollhouse
- Gabby, a character in The Shadows Over Loathing

== See also ==
- Gabby (disambiguation)
- Gaby (disambiguation)
- Gabi (disambiguation)
