= Doris Dana =

American translator (1920–2006)

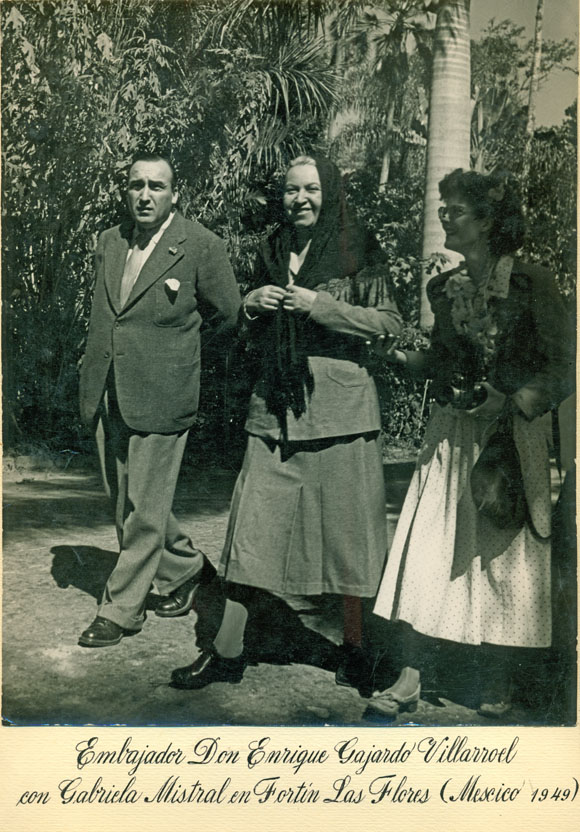
- Dana (right) in 1949
- Born: 1920; New York, US
- Died: 28 November 2006 (aged 85 or 86); Naples, Florida, US
- Occupations: Translator, author
- Writing career
- Period: 1946–57

Doris Dana (1920 – 28 November 2006) was an American translator known for having been Gabriela Mistral's partner, the Chilean Nobel Prize winner. Dana inherited Mistral's estate following Mistral's death in January 1957.

== Biography ==
Dana was born into a wealthy family of New York society in 1920. They lost almost all of their money and property in the wake of the Wall Street crash of 1929. Because part of those funds had already been set aside in trust funds for the education of Dana and her two sisters, they received a thorough education at the Lenox School. Her younger sister, Leora Dana, went on to become a stage and screen star; her older sister, Ethel Dana, became a medical doctor in California. Doris Dana received a bachelor's degree in classics (Latin) from Barnard College, Columbia University.

She briefly taught night school in New York City, before writing script "treatments" in New York City during the 1950s. After until Mistral's death in 1957 she never worked full-time again.

Dana was a personal friend of Gabriela Mistral with whom she lived from 1953 until Mistral's death in 1957. Although they first met in New York in 1946, Mistral did not remember that meeting. Dana began a correspondence with her in February 1948 that led to an invitation to visit the poet at her then-residence in Santa Barbara, California. The two women intermittently traveled together in Mexico and Italy from the end of 1948 to the end of 1952, at which point Dana purchased a house in Long Island, where she supervised Mistral's end-of-life care. After the poet's death in January 1957, Doris Dana translated and edited one bilingual edition of the Selected Poems of Gabriela Mistral from Spanish to English.

In 2006, Dana died and left behind what is known as el legado, or the legacy, an archive of Mistral's unpublished manuscripts, letters, taped recordings of poems, and photographs of Dana and Mistral. Many of the letters left in this archive were published by the University of New Mexico in 2018 in the book Gabriela Mistral's Letters to Doris Dana. In these letters, it is revealed that Dana and Mistral were lovers from 1948 until Mistral's death in 1957. Despite these claims, Doris Dana, who was 31 years younger than Mistral, explicitly denied in her final interview that their relationship was ever romantic or erotic, describing it as that of a stepmother and stepdaughter. Dana also denied being a lesbian and expressed skepticism regarding Mistral's sexual orientation.

== Works ==
Apart from the organization of Mistral's papers and the administration of the writer's estate, all three of Doris Dana's works are books drawn from the Mistral legacy, which she controlled for fifty years:

- Crickets and Frogs, a short fable for children.
- The Elephant and His Secret/El Elefante Y Su Secreto, another short fable for children.
