= Sonetos de la Muerte =

Work by Gabriela Mistral

Sonetos de la Muerte (Sonnets of Death) is a work by the Chilean poet Gabriela Mistral, first published in 1914. She used a nom de plume as she feared that she may have lost her job as a teacher. The work was awarded first prize in the Juegos Florales, a national literary contest.

The Sonnets of Death were inspired by the suicide of Mistral's former lover, Romelio Ureta, in which she claims for his love, argues jealousy and discusses their reunion after their deaths. However Mistral's relationship with Ureta is a matter of significant controversy. It is claimed by Chilean experts, such as Cedomil Goic, that the publication of the Sonnets of Death marks the beginning of modern poetry in Chilean literature.

== Sonnets ==
The three sonnets that compose the work include 42 emotionally intense verses and present a complex poetic structure. The order in which the sonnets are numbered does not correspond to the chronological sequence of the events they describe, which contributes to the dramatic effect of the collection.

One of the sonnets features a dialogue between the poetic speaker and God, in which the speaker pleads for death or the return of her beloved. This moment positions both the speaker and God as accomplices in an act of symbolic murder, deepening the themes of grief and divine complicity. The final sonnet suggests a confession before divine judgment, where the speaker awaits God's verdict, consumed by guilt and seeking expiation.

Although traditionally interpreted through a biographical lens, focusing on Mistral’s personal loss, recent readings have highlighted the work's rich symbolic and theological dimensions.
