= Gelnica =

Gelnica Gölnicbánya
- Municipality
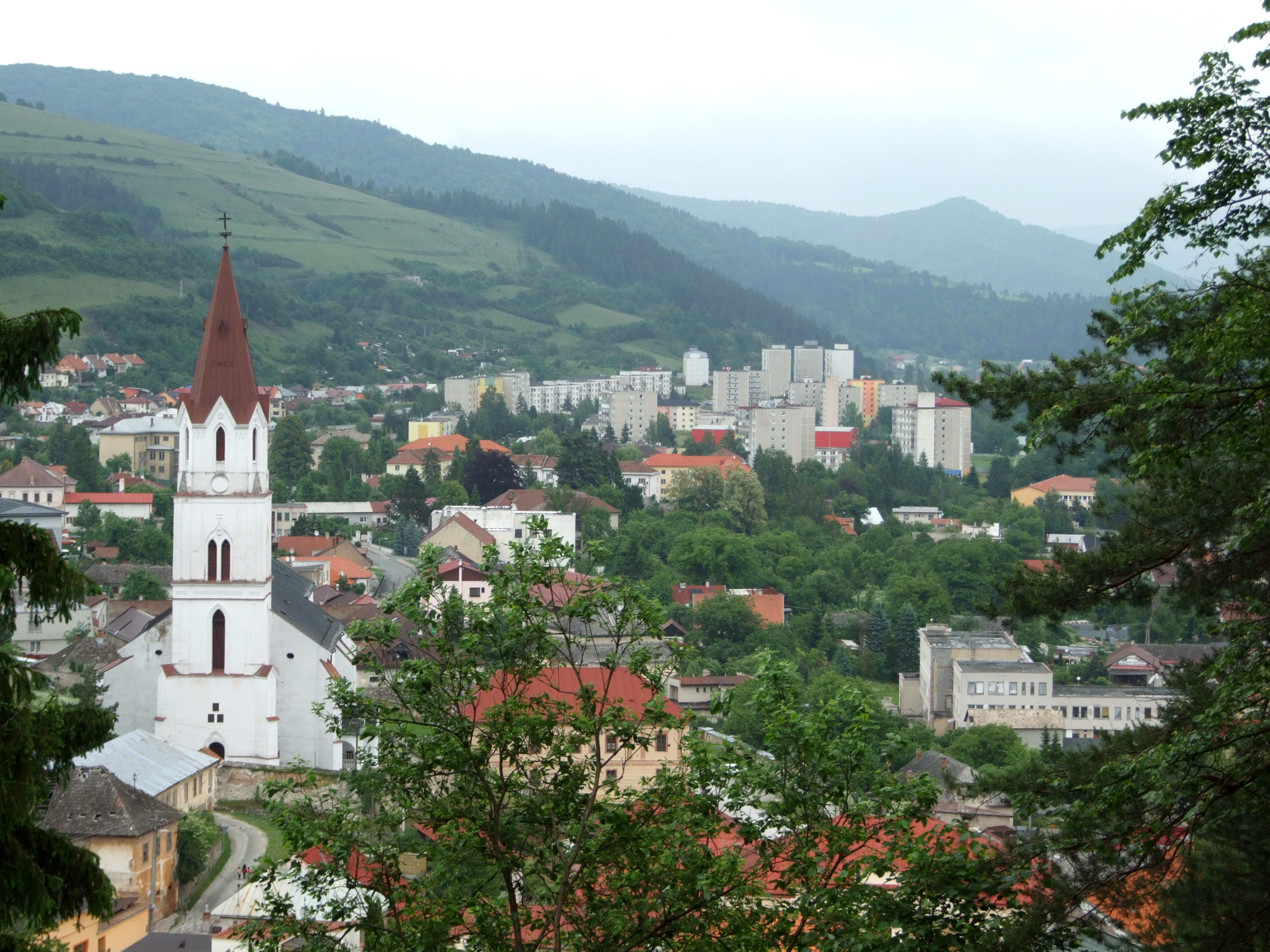

- Flag Coat of arms

- Location of Gelnica in the Košice Region Location of Gelnica in Slovakia
- Coordinates: 48.85°N 20.94°E
- Country: Slovakia
- Region: Košice Region
- District: Gelnica District
- First mentioned: 1246

Government
  - Mayor: Dušan Tomaško

Area
  - Total: 57.65 km^{2} (22.26 sq mi)
- Elevation: 365 m (1,198 ft)

Population (2025)
  - Total: 5,689
- Time zone: UTC+1 (CET)
  - Summer (DST): UTC+2 (CEST)
- Postal code: 560 1
- Area code: +421 53
- Vehicle registration plate (until 2022): GL
- Website: www.gelnica.sk

Gelnica (Hungarian: Gölnicbánya, German: Göllnitz) is a town in the Košice Region of Eastern Slovakia. It has a population of 6,076.

== Names ==
The name comes from the name of the river Hnilec derived from Slavic word hnilý (rotten). The initial g in the German form Göllnitz indicates that the name was adopted by Germans before the spirantisation of Slavic g to h in Slovak (around the 12th century). The current Slovak name Gelnica comes from this secondary German form. The Hungarian Gölnicbánya (bánya – mine) refers to the town's mining activity.

== Geography ==
The municipality lies at an altitude of 365 metres (1,198 ft) and covers an area of 57.65 km^{2} (22.26 sq mi) (2025).

It is located in the northern part of the Slovak Ore Mountains, in the Hnilec river valley, which flows a few kilometres downstream into Hornád. The town lies at the both banks of Hnilec, has an altitude of 375 metres (1,230 feet), and is located around 38 kilometres (24 miles) from Košice.

== History ==
Carpathian Germans chiefly from Bavaria began to settle the formerly Slavic settlement during the 13th century. By 1264 it was an established mining town and became a royal mining town of the Kingdom of Hungary by 1276, from where the first mentioned is recorded (as "Gelnic"). For many years Gelnica was a chief mining town in Szepes County of the Kingdom of Hungary. Silver, copper, but also gold, quicksilver, lead and iron ore were mined in the mines. Between 1465–1520, Gelnica lost most of its privileges. The town's population in the second half of the 16th century is estimated at 1000 people, whereby the ratio of Germans and Slovaks, who were the main ethnic groups, is estimated to have been 3:1. In 1910, the town's population of 3833 inhabitants consisted of 2095 Germans, 1098 Slovaks and 606 Hungarians. The German population was expelled in 1945.

== Sights ==
The town includes the ruins of a medieval castle, destroyed by a fire in 1685. Other attractions include a Gothic church and Renaissance town hall, both remodelled along Baroque lines, and a mining museum.

== Population ==
Historical population
| Year | Pop. | ±% |
|---|---|---|
| 1970 | 4,640 | — |
| 1980 | 5,100 | +9.9% |
| 1991 | 6,277 | +23.1% |
| 2001 | 6,404 | +2.0% |
| 2011 | 6,202 | −3.2% |
| 2021 | 5,951 | −4.0% |
Source: Censuses

Population statistic (10 years)
| Year | 1995 | 2005 | 2015 | 2025 |
|---|---|---|---|---|
| Count | 6361 | 6171 | 6140 | 5689 |
| Difference | | −2.98% | −0.50% | −7.34% |

Population statistic
| Year | 2024 | 2025 |
|---|---|---|
| Count | 5775 | 5689 |
| Difference | | −1.48% |

It has a population of 5689 people (31 December 2025).

=== Ethnicity ===
Census 2021 (1+%)
| Ethnicity | Number | Fraction |
|---|---|---|
| Slovak | 5471 | 91.93% |
| Not found out | 320 | 5.37% |
| Romani | 167 | 2.8% |
| Total | 5951 | |

In year 2021 was 5951 people by ethnicity 5471 as Slovak, 320 as Not found out, 167 as Romani, 55 as German, 28 as Rusyn, 22 as Czech, 14 as Other, 9 as Vietnamese, 9 as Ukrainian, 7 as Hungarian, 5 as Chinese, 5 as Russian, 4 as Turkish, 2 as English, 1 as Jewish, 1 as Romanian, 1 as Canadian and 1 as Croatian.

Note on population: The difference values of population numbers in the table "Population statistic" and in the sections "Ethnicity" & "Religion" is caused by the use of various statistical methods.

=== Religion ===
Census 2021 (1+%)
| Religion | Number | Fraction |
|---|---|---|
| Roman Catholic Church | 3502 | 58.85% |
| None | 1577 | 26.5% |
| Not found out | 338 | 5.68% |
| Greek Catholic Church | 200 | 3.36% |
| Evangelical Church | 174 | 2.92% |
| Total | 5951 | |

In year 2021 was 5951 people by religion 3502 from Roman Catholic Church, 1577 from None, 338 from Not found out, 200 from Greek Catholic Church, 174 from Evangelical Church, 49 from Eastern Orthodox Church, 31 from Christian Congregations in Slovakia, 17 from Apostolic Church, 12 from Jehovah's Witnesses, 9 from Buddhism, 8 from Other, 7 from Islam, 5 from Paganism and natural spirituality, 5 from Other and not ascertained christian church, 5 from Ad hoc movements, 4 from Calvinist Church, 3 from Seventh-day Adventist Church, 2 from Baptists Church, 1 from Jewish community, 1 from Hinduism and 1 from United Methodist Church.

== Twin towns — sister cities ==
Gelnica is twinned with:

- Horní Suchá, Czech Republic
- Gennep, Netherlands
- Rudnik nad Sanem, Poland
- Le Pradet, France
- Novodnistrovsk, Ukraine

== Notable people ==
- Gabriela Rothmayerová (born 1951), writer and politician
- Eugen Šváb (1936–2024), swing musician

== See also ==
- List of municipalities and towns in Slovakia
