= Gabrielle Bossis =

French Catholic laywoman

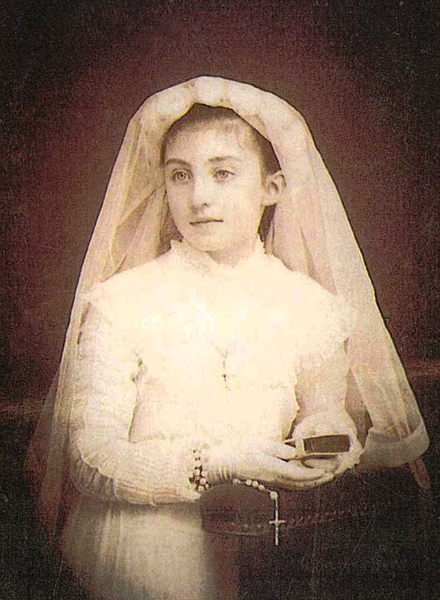
- Born: 1874
- Died: 1950 (aged 75–76)
- Known for: Christian mysticism

Gabrielle Bossis (French: [ɡabʁijɛl bɔsi]; 1874–1950) was a French Catholic laywoman, nurse, playwright, actress and mystic, best known for her mystical work Lui et Moi, published in a very abridged English translation as He and I.

== Life ==
Gabrielle Bossis was born 26 February 1874 in her parents' town house Nantes, the youngest of four children of a wealthy bourgeois family. Her father owned property and ran a business selling boat repair parts. She attended a convent school in Nantes. Her father died in 1898, her mother would bring the family to spend winters in Nice. Her mother died in 1908, and her sister Clémence in 1912. Her inheritance allowed her to set up a business making church ornaments for the Missions.

She obtained a nursing degree. During World War I, she was a nurse for four years, first in a hospital and then at the front near Verdun.

In 1923, at the request of the parish priest of Le Fresne-sur-Loire, she wrote a play called Czar, which was a great success. From 1923 to 1936, Bossis wrote thirteen three act comedies. She not only wrote plays, but also directed and played leading roles in them. She wrote many other works, in which witty and cheerful content is combined with a moral and religious underpinning. She soon became famous and toured with her plays not only France, but also other countries in Europe, North Africa, North America and Canada.

She always dressed in white, with wide-brimmed hats and old-fashioned dresses. Even when traveling, she never missed daily Mass if at all possible. With the German occupation in 1940, Bossis found refuge in Curzon. Her house in Nantes was bombed in 1943.

In August 1949, Bossis underwent surgery for breast cancer; by March 1950, the cancer had spread to her lungs. She died June 9, 1950.

== Lui et moi ==
At the age of 62, in August 1936, on the ship Ile de France, on her way to Canada, she heard for the first time a mysterious inner voice, which from then on accompanied her until her death. The words, which she accepts as coming from Jesus Christ, she jotted down and wrote 10 notebooks in 13 years. In 1944 her notes were presented to Bishop Villepelet and four years later in 1948 she published anonymously the first volume with a selection of her notes, which received an enthusiastic reception In France, where 50 editions of Lui et moi were published by 1967. They were published with a preface by Villepelet.

=== Quotes ===
Some quotes from the book, written as Jesus to Bossis:

"Keep me company more and more. You can never know what it means to me to be treated as an intimate friend. It is so rare. I delight in this as a human being."

"Do not fail to give Me your sufferings. They help sinners."

"I asked you to wake up in the arms of the Father because each one of your mornings is a new creation."

"I asked you to fall asleep in the Holy Spirit because your last conscious breath should be in love."

"Try to understand My yearning for you, for all My children."

"You see that you can do nothing by yourself. Throw yourself into My arms every morning and ask Me for strength to pay attention to the little details. Life is made up of little things, you know. Don't count on yourself any more. Count on me."

"For some I am unknown. For others, a stranger, a severe master, or an accuser. Few people come to me as to one of a loved family. And yet my love is there, waiting for them. So tell them to come, to enter in, to give themselves up to love just as they are... I'll restore. I'll transform them. And they will know a joy they have never known before. I alone can give that joy.”
