= Gabriela Mistral mine =

Copper mine in Chile

Gabriela Mistral
- Location within Antofagasta Region Location within Chile
- Location: Sierra Gorda, Antofagasta Region, Chile; 23°24′38.87″S 68°49′7.87″W
- Products: Copper
- Production: 105,800 tons of copper
- Financial year: 2023
- Opened: 2008
- Company: Codelco

Gabriela Mistral mine or Gaby is an open-pit copper mine in the Atacama Desert of northern Chile. It lies at an altitude of 2,660 meters above sea level in the inland commune of Sierra Gorda. Codelco owns and operates the mine. In 2023 it produced 105,800 tons of copper, but it has an estimated maximum production potential of 170,000 tons of copper each year. Since 2013 it has been powered by the solar power plant of Pampa Elvira.

The mine opened in 2008 was owned and operated by Minera Gaby S.A., a subsidiary of Codelco, until 2013 when it was incorporated directly to Codelco becoming a division of the company.

According to Codelco about 1/5 of the employees of the mine are women and about 1/10 of the employees belong to one of the indigenous peoples in Chile.

It is named after the poet Gabriela Mistral (1889–1957).
