= Gabriele Tinti =

Gabriele Tinti may refer to:

- Gabriele Tinti (actor) (1932–1991), Italian actor
- Gabriele Tinti (poet) (born 1979), Italian writer
