= Gabriela Rothmayerová =

Slovak politician, writer and journalist

Member of the National Council of the Slovak Republic
- In office 1990–1994

Personal details
- Born: 14 March 1951 (age 74); Trnava, Czechoslovakia
- Political party: Party of the Democratic Left
- Spouse: Emil Polák
- Children: 1
- Education: Comenius University
- Occupation: Politician, writer, journalist

Gabriela Rothmayerová (born 14 March 1951) is a Slovak journalist, writer and politician. From 1990 to 1994 she served as a Member of the National Council.

== Biography ==
Gabriela Rothmayerová was born on 14 March 1951 in Gelnica to a mining family as the sixth of seven children. After graduating from a local high school in 1969, she started working in the East Slovak Ironworks and writing for a local newspaper. From 1970 to 1975 she studied journalism at the Comenius University.

Following her graduation from the university, Rothmayerová worked as a journalist for the daily Smena. She was also the editor of the youth magazine Ohník.

Following the Velvet Revolution, Rothmayerová was elected to the Federal Assembly on the list of the reformed Communist Party, which rebranded itself as the Party of the Democratic Left. She represented this party also in the National Council of Slovakia following the Dissolution of Czechoslovakia.

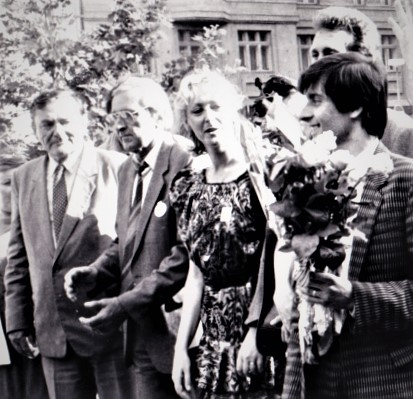
Rothmayerová campaigning with Vladimír Mináč and Peter Weiss, early 1990s

In 1994 Rothmayerová quit politics and returned to journalism. In 1994 she became the editor of the Pravda daily and in 1997 she joined the Slovenský rozhlas. In 2012 she became an advisor to the prime minister of Slovakia Robert Fico.

Rothmayerová debuted as a writer in 1982 with a collection of short stories Lastovičie hniezdo. In 1992 she published a series of her reflections of her political career Zo zápisnika poslankyne. In the 2000s, she published three novels reflecting the social situation in Slovakia at the time. In the late 2010s, she started working on a biography of the last prime minister of the Slovak Socialist Republic Peter Colotka.

In 2022 and 2023 Rothmayerová wrote a series of articles blaming Ukraine and the United States for the Russian invasion of Ukraine.

== Personal life ==
Rothmayerová is married to the journalist Emil Polák. They have one son.
