= Gabriele Rabel =

Austrian physicist and botanist

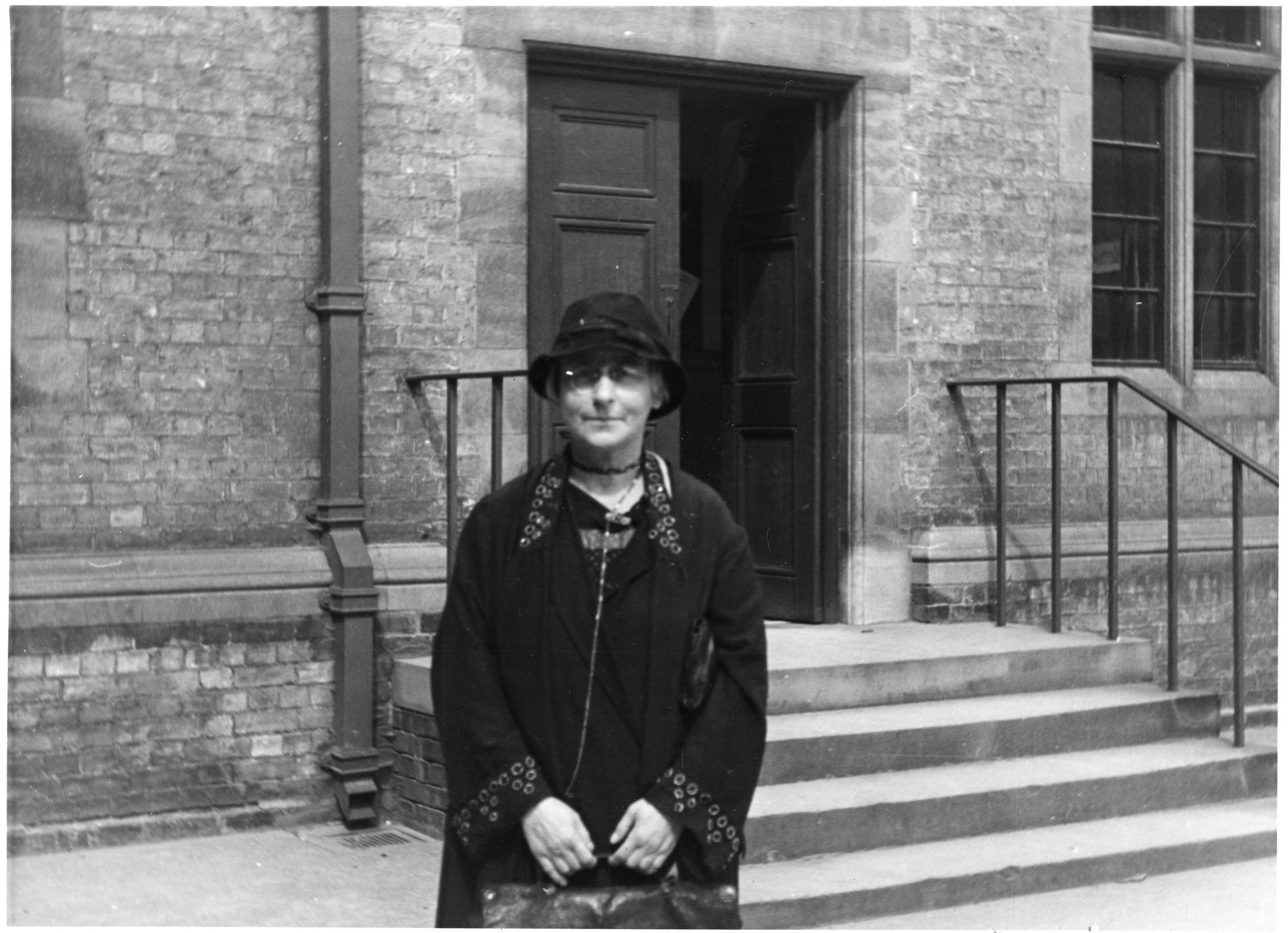
- Gabriele Rabel in Cambridge in 1938
- Born: 1880; Vienna, Austria
- Died: August 1963 (aged 82–83); Cambridge, England
- Education: University of Vienna
- Occupations: Physicist, botanist

Gabriele Rabel (1880 – 27 August 1963) was an Austrian physicist and botanist.

== Biography ==
Gabriele Rabel was born the youngest of three to a prosperous Viennese lawyer in 1880.

Rabel studied under Richard Wettstein at the University of Vienna, studying plants. She went on to do experimental work on the color adaptation of certain low plants to their surroundings. Eventually moving on to studying theoretical physics in Leipzig and in Berlin with Albert Einstein and Max Planck, getting her P.hD. in physics for a thesis entitled "The Intensity of Certain Lines of the H-Spectrum as Dependent on Gas Pressure". Rabel's recollections of Planck have provided great insight into him as a lecturer.

In 1923, Rabel was diagnosed with manic depression and lived in a sanatorium for two years where she started studying philosophy, working with Hermann Keyserling and Rudolf Steiner.

After becoming intrigued by philology, she conducted research at the Goethe Archives in Weimar. There, in 1927, she published Goethe und Kant and books about Johann Wolfgang von Goethe and Immanuel Kant. In 1932, she became a regular contributor to Science Service while still working as a scientist in Germany. As a contributor, she wrote summaries of topics ranging from paleontology to syphilis, continental drift to psychotherapy and poetry.

In May 1940, Rabel moved to England to avoid the economic and political situation developing in Germany prior to World War II. She lived in the United States for four years lecturing. During the 1930s and 1940s she wrote about evolution, genetics, and Charles I of Austria, and lived in Cambridge.

She died on 27 August 1963 in Cambridge, England. Her papers are held at the Churchill Archives Centre, found in Churchill College, Cambridge.

== Notable works ==
- Rabel, Gabriele, Goethe and Kant (1927) Selbstverlag
- Rabel, Gabriele, translator, Kant: Selections (1963)
