= Gabrielle Tayac =

American historian and curator

- Occupations: Historian, Curator and Activist
- Known for: National Museum of the American Indian, League of Indigenous Sovereign Nations, Spirit Aligned.

Gabrielle Tayac is a historian and curator at the Smithsonian National Museum of the American Indian. She is a member of the Piscataway Indian Nation and Tayac Territory, a state-recognized tribe in southern Maryland. Tayac is active in matters of Indigenous land and water rights as well as U.S. government treaty compliance.

== Early life and education ==
Tayac was born in Greenwich Village, New York City. She received her BS in social work and American Indian studies from Cornell University in 1989 and her PhD in sociology from Harvard University in 1999. She is the niece of Piscataway Chief Billy Redwing Tayac.

== Professional life ==
Tayac began her career at the National Museum of the American Indian as a research consultant in 1999. Previously, she had worked to develop a school curriculum that would present the complexity of native peoples and address contemporary issues such as intellectual property. Tayac helped develop the museum's education department, and her research assisted in shaping its educational role and framework.

After the museum's inauguration in 2004, Tayac joined the full-time staff as a curator. She co-curated one of the museums inaugural permanent exhibits, "Our Lives: Contemporary Life and Identity." She was the sole curator of the exhibit "Return to a Native Place: Native Peoples of the Chesapeake Region", which opened in 2007. She also co-curated the traveling exhibit "IndiVisible: African-Native American Lives in the Americas". Her latest exhibit, "Native New York: Where Nations Rise", is scheduled to open in 2019.

== Activism ==
Tayac has been active on various matters relating to Native American civil rights and tribal sovereignty. She is a co-founder of the League of Indigenous Sovereign Nations, a hemispheric alliance of Native peoples. Currently, she serves as communications director for the Spirit Aligned Leadership Program.

In 2014, Tayac marched with the Cowboy Indian Alliance to protest the proposed Keystone XL pipeline. In 2016, she participated in protests against the imprisonment of Leonard Peltier, a member of the American Indian Movement arrested in the Pine Ridge Reservation protests in the 1970s. In 2017, Tayac provided one of the opening remarks at the People's Climate March on President Trump's 100th day in office.
