= Gabriela Moyseowicz =

Polish composer and pianist

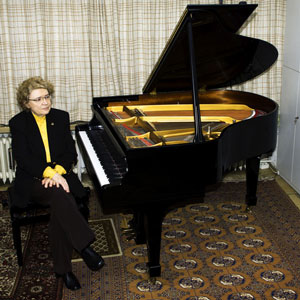
Gabriela Moyseowicz

Gabriela Maria Moyseowicz (born 4 May 1944 in Lwów) is a Polish composer and pianist.

== Biography ==
Gabriela Moyseowicz played piano skillfully at the age of three. She was recognized as a musical prodigy at music schools in Gdańsk, Bytom and Gliwice. At the age of 13, Gabriela composed a 25-minute concerto for two pianos. She performed it before a group of respected professors-musicians in Kraków and was instantly admitted to the prestigious Academy of Music in Kraków. The concerto was both classical & romantic in style. The work and a number of superb fugues she composed as school-exercises were the first indicators of the scope of the composer’s talent.

A renowned musical critic in Kraków^{1} highly praised the first atonal composition of Gabriela - “The Piano Sonata No. 1” (1960). Also, the atonal chamber work “Media Vita” (1961) was met with a warm reaction by both the public and musical critics.

From 1962 Moyseowicz attended composition classes at the Academy of Music in Kraków and the State Conservatory in Katowice, and graduated from the latter in 1967. She was awarded the degree of Master of Arts after submitting her second piano concerto. A stormy discussion resulted, among the local professors, over Gabriela’s dissertation in which she had presented her artistic attitudes.

In 1974 Moyseowicz moved to West Berlin, where she worked for thirty years as an organist and choir director at a Catholic church. She made several recordings of her own music for the German Radio (WDR, NDR). Two CDs with orchestral and piano compositions, respectively, were released. Scores of over twenty of Moyseowicz’s compositions were released by a famed musical editor in Berlin.

== Appraisal ==
Although Moyseowicz has always been at ease with the tonal system, it has not been her main artistic goal to compose tonal music. The ideas of the “sclerotic avant-garde of the sixties”^{2} were never attractive for her. From her teens she searched for her own way and managed to develop an original style that has nothing to do with any “modern” or “fashionable” ideas of the second half of the 20th century. Gabriela’s compositions are thoroughly atonal, but listeners have, very often, an impression to hear the tonal music. It is a secret of Gabriela’s workshop that she is able to extract from the highly complex sound material sequences of ear-friendly modern contemporary classical music. The composer uses instruments with the great respect to their design, destination and limitations, yet she produces extraordinary effects. Her dazzling music is rich in invention and imagination. “Gabriela Moyseowicz is a genial composer whose work merits more attention”^{6}. The opinions like this have been expressed on several occasions by musical professionals and music lovers. The work of Gabriela Moyseowicz has been subjected to analyses by several authors^{3,4,6,7(8)}.

== Works ==
Gabriela Moyseowicz has composed a variety of atonal instrumental and vocal works^{3,7(8)}. They include piano-, violin- and cello-sonatas, piano concertos, one symphony, one oratorium, cantatas, songs, etc. Tonal compositions include church songs, a capriccio for string orchestra, piano variations and other occasional works.
