= Gabrielle Armstrong-Scott =

New Zealand diver (born 1996)

Personal information
- Born: 1996 (age 29–30) Wellington, New Zealand

Sport
- Sport: Swimming
- Strokes: Platform diving
- Club: Princeton University

Gabrielle Armstrong-Scott (born 1996) was New Zealand's top ranked platform diver, ranked 22nd in the world in 2010.

== Career ==
At age nine, Armstrong-Scott broke her first New Zealand record and at age 13 competed at the Diving World Cup. She has broken a total of 19 NZ records in both the Junior and Open categories. She was the youngest competitor at the 2010 Commonwealth Games at the age of 14 years and 34 days and is the second youngest ever to compete for New Zealand.

She was also a member of the 2015–16 Princeton University diving team, taking an internship with the United Nations upon graduation.
