= Gabriele Mandel =

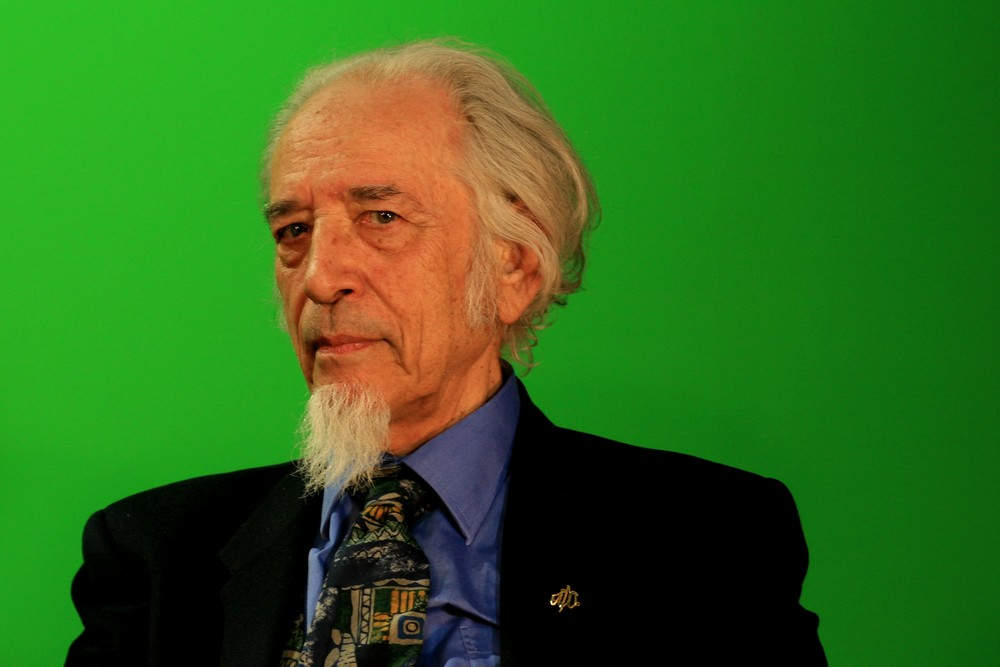
- Born: February 12, 1924; Bologna
- Died: July 1, 2010 (aged 86); Milan

Gabriele Mandel (12 February 1924 in Bologna – 1 July 2010 in Milan) was an Italian Islamist, psychologist, writer, and artist of Afghan descent. He was also known as Gabriele Mandel Khān and as Gabriele Sugana.

Mandel was a Sufi guide (shaikh), of the Jerrahi Order.

== Early life and education ==
Mandel was the son of the Jewish writer Carlotta Rimini and the Sufi and historian Yusuf Roberto Mandel (of Turco-Afghan descent). His godfather was the poet Gabriele D'Annunzio. A Muslim, Mandel promoted interfaith dialogue and peace-building throughout his life.

In his youth Mandel studied music at the Conservatory of Vicenza, graduating in violin and harmony. After WWII (during which, along with his father, he was imprisoned and tortured by Nazis) he studied classical languages and literature and did extensive archaeological field research in India and in the Middle East, which he subsequently published. Later he developed scientific interests and graduated first in psychology and then as a medical doctor at the Faculty of Medicine of Pavia.

== Career ==
After the training he began working as a psychotherapist, an activity that he continued during his life, in parallel with that of ceramist and writer. He wrote nearly two hundred books –many of which were translated into several languages- on subjects ranging from art history and calligraphy to Sufism. His ceramics have been exhibited throughout the world.

== Publications ==
He was the author of some 200 books published by major Italian presses (Rizzoli, Mondadori, Rusconi, Longanesi, Edizioni San Paolo, Franco Maria Ricci, Bompiani, etc.), many of which have been translated into several languages, including English.

=== Books in English (selected) ===
- Japanese Alphabet: The 48 Essential Characters (2008), Abbeville Press ISBN 978-0-7892-0959-7
- Arabic Script: Styles, Variants and Calligraphic Adaptations (2006), Abbeville Press ISBN 978-0-7892-0879-8
- Concise Guide to Tarot (1995), Grange Books; ISBN 978-1856275927
- The Complete Paintings of Botticelli (1986), Penguin Classics of World Art; ISBN 978-0140086485
- Tantra - rites of love (1979), Rizzoli; ASIN: B001NOH50U
- How to recognize Islamic art (1979), Macdonald Educational; ISBN 978-0140052381
- The Life and Times of Genghis Khan; Portraits of Greatness (1970), Littlehampton Book Services Ltd; ISBN 978-0600338246
- The Life and Times of Mohammed; Portraits of Greatness (1969), Hamlyn; ASIN: B002AHV1QS
- The Life and Times of Buddha; Portraits of Greatness (1968), Hamlyn; ISBN 978-0600031536
- Siena, the city of the Palio (1959), Silvana Publisher; ASIN: B0007IYUOM

=== Books in Italian (selected) ===
- Alfabeto giapponese (2007), Milano, ed. Mondadori; ISBN 978-8837049881
- Islam (2006), (Dizionari delle Religioni) ed. Electa Mondadori; ISBN 978-8837041021
- Il Mathnawì di Jalàl àlDìn Rùmì (2006), edizione Bompiani, sei volumi; ISBN 8845256448
- La musicoterapia dei sufi (2006) edizioni Arcipelago ISBN 978-8876953231
- Edizione economica del Corano (2005) ed. UTET; ISBN 978-8802074832
- La via al Sufismo nella spiritualità e nella pratica (2004) edito da Bompiani ISBN 978-8845212758
- Storia del Sufismo (2001). Edizioni Bompiani; ISBN 978-8845291180
- L'alfabeto ebraico (2000). Mondadori, Milano; ISBN 978-8804479970
- L'alfabeto arabo (2000). Mondadori, Milano; ISBN 978-8837073831
- La magia nell'Islàm (1997). Simonelli Editore; ISBN 978-8886792059
- Alla ricerca dell'Io. Lezioni di storia della psicologia (1985). Arcipelago Edizioni; ISBN 978-8876950148
- Essere e fare. Lezioni di storia e psicologia dell'arte (1984). Arcipelago Edizioni; ISBN 978-8876950186

== Awards ==
=== In Italy ===
- Commander of the Order of Merit of the Italian Republic (Ordine al Merito della Repubblica Italiana) on 17 November 1975.

=== In Turkey ===
- The Amphitheater 4 of the Selçuk University in Konya was named "Prof. Dr. Gabriel Mandel Khan" on 3 May 2010.
