= Gabrielė =

- Gender: Female
- Language: Lithuanian

Origin
- Region of origin: Lithuania

Other names
- Related names: Gabrielius (masculine form), Gabriel, Gabrielle, Gabriela, Gabriella

Gabrielė is a Lithuanian feminine given name. People bearing the name Gabrielė include:

- Gabrielė Jankutė (born 1993), Lithuanian track cyclist
- Gabrielė Leščinskaitė (born 1996), Lithuanian biathlete
- Gabrielė Petkevičaitė-Bitė (1861–1943), Lithuanian educator, writer, and activist
