= Gabriella Lengyel =

Hungarian volleyball player (born 1960)

Personal information
- Nationality: Hungarian
- Born: 18 August 1960 (age 64); Szeged, Hungary

Sport
- Sport: Volleyball

Gabriella Lengyel (born 18 August 1960) is a Hungarian volleyball player. She competed in the women's tournament at the 1980 Summer Olympics.
