= Gabriela Böhm =

American filmmaker (born 1964)

Gabriela S. Böhm
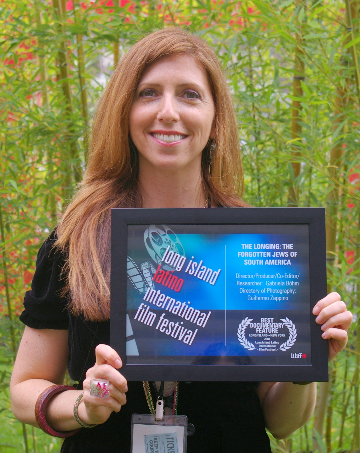
- Böhm at the LILLIFF Film Festival (2007)
- Born: 1964 (age 61–62); Buenos Aires, Argentina
- Occupation: Film director/producer
- Years active: 2000—Present

Gabriela Böhm (Hebrew: גבריאלה בוהם; born 1964) is an independent documentary filmmaker from Buenos Aires, Argentina now living in Los Angeles.

== Background ==
Born in Buenos Aires, Argentina to immigrant parents — survivors of the Holocaust — she completed high school and the army in Israel before she moved to the United States. Böhm is fluent in Spanish, English and Hebrew. She studied painting, sculpture, art history, photography and film at A Midrasha Le Morim Leomanut Art School in Israel (1985–1986), got a BFA from New York University Tisch School of the Arts (1990) and is an MFA candidate in documentary film at the Maine Media College.

=== Film career ===
Her first feature-length documentary, Passages (2000), which she wrote, directed and produced with her company Böhm Productions, won the Best Documentary award at the Woodstock Film Festival. This personal film was a search into her family's history in an attempt to pass on its legacy to her unborn son.

Böhm also wrote, directed, produced and co-edited The Longing: The Forgotten Jews of South America (2007), which has won numerous awards including Best Documentary at the Long Island Latino International Film Festival, a Telly Award for Religion and Spirituality, and Best Latino Film at the Santa Fe Film Festival. The film tells the story of modern-day Crypto-Jews (or marranos) forced to convert to Catholicism during the Inquisition in Spain and Portugal and who are now returning to their Jewish faith. The film has screened internationally at film festivals in the US, Canada, South America, Europe and Israel.

Böhm wrote, directed, produced and co-edited Raquel: a marked woman (2014) which has screened in the US, Canada, Europe and Israel. Synopsis: Raquel's story is from another time, but resonates today. A mother, she was torn from her children and tricked into prostitution. In the early 20th century, thousands of Eastern European Jewish women were lured to Argentina and forced into prostitution. Others gave up. Not Raquel. Bravely, she exposed her oppressors.

The film has been honored with a Bronze Telly Award — Non-Broadcast Film/Video — History/Biography (2015). Other awards include: Silver Prize, Robinson International Short Film Competition (2015), Best Short Documentary/Punta del Este Jewish Film Festival (2015), Founders Award: The Joyce Forum/San Diego Jewish Film Festival (2015), Best in Fest Selection/ Palm Springs International ShortFest (2014) and Best Short Documentary/Warsaw Jewish Film Festival (2014).

She also directed, produced, wrote and edited Voice-Less, a short experimental film that screened at many US film festivals.

== Personal life ==
Today Böhm is an American citizen, and she lives with her son in Los Angeles.

== Filmography ==
- Raquel: a marked woman (2014) - 34 min
- The Longing: the Forgotten Jews of South America (2007) - 75 min
- Passages (2000) - 65 min
- The Wild Side - short documentary
- Voice-less (1990) - short film
