= Gabriella Demczuk =

Lebanese-American artist and documentary photographer

- Born: Stockholm, Sweden
- Education: Goldsmiths University of London, The George Washington University
- Occupations: Artist, documentary photographer
- Website: www.gabriellademczuk.com

Gabriella Demczuk is a Lebanese-American artist and documentary photographer.

== Biography ==
Gabriella Demczuk was born in Stockholm, Sweden. After spending some time in Luxembourg and Belgium, she later moved to the United States, settling in Baltimore. She received her graduate degree in research architecture from the Centre for Research Architecture at Goldsmiths University of London and her undergraduate degree in fine arts and journalism from The George Washington University. She also studied photography at the Parsons School of Art and Design in Paris.

== Career ==
A regular contributor to The New York Times, Time and CNN, her work has spanned Washington politics, immigration and the US border, the legacy of slavery, environmental policy, as well as portrait commissions. She has also been published in The Washington Post, NPR, The Baltimore Sun, Smithsonian, Politico, and The New Yorker, among others. She has been recognized by the White House News Photographers Association, American Photo, the Magenta Foundation, the Society of Professional Journalists and Pictures of the Year International (POYi). In 2015, Gabriella was named Photoboite's 30 Under 30 Women Photographers.
