= Gabbi =

Gabbi is a given name and surname. Notable people with the name include:

- Gabbi Angella or Gabriele Angella, Italian association footballer
- Gabbi Cunningham (born 1998), American hurdler
- Gabbi Garcia (born 1998), Filipino actress, singer, model, vlogger and recording artist
- Gabbi Jennings or Gabrielle Jennings
- Gabbi Tuft, American professional wrestler
- Wamiqa Gabbi (born 1993), Indian film actress

== See also ==
- Gabby, a name
- Gabbai, person who assists in the running of synagogue services in some way
