= Gabriele Koch =

Gabriele Koch (born 1948 Germany) is a studio potter. Koch studied at the University of Heidelberg 1967–73 and later attended Goldsmiths, University of London, completing a diploma in Art and Design, Ceramics 1979–81.

"earth, water, air and fire. Gabriele Koch's lovely pots speak of all those elements as vividly as any I know." Sir David Attenborough

Koch's work is in several museum collections including the Victoria and Albert Museum, London, the Fitzwilliam Museum, Cambridge, and the Ashmolean Museum, Oxford.
