= Gabriela Avigur-Rotem =

Israeli–Argentine novelist (born 1946)

- גבריאלה אביגור-רותם
- Born: 1946 (age 79–80); Buenos Aires, Argentina
- Education: Tel Aviv University
- Occupation: Novelist
- Years active: 1980–present
- Employers: University of Haifa; Ben-Gurion University of the Negev

Gabriela Avigur-Rotem (Hebrew: גבריאלה אביגור-רותם; born 1946) is an Israeli–Argentinean novelist.

== Early and personal life ==
Born in Buenos Aires, Argentina in 1946, Avigur-Rotem moved to Israel in 1950. She is Jewish. Avigur-Rotem studied Hebrew and English literature at Tel Aviv University.

== Career ==
Avigur-Rotem released her debut poetry collection in 1980, followed by her first novel in 1992. Over the years, she has received numerous honours, including the Anna Rabinowitz Prize for Poetry (1990) and the Prime Minister's Prize for Hebrew Literary Works on two occasions (1992 and 2001). Her novel Heatwave and Crazy Birds (2001) earned both the Goldberg Prize and Keshet Media Group's Gold and Platinum Book Prizes, while later recognition included the Women's International Zionist Organization (2006) and the Geffen Award for Every Story Is a Sudden Cat (2014). She hosts writing workshops at the University of Haifa and Ben-Gurion University of the Negev, and also edits works for Haifa University Publishing House. She is known for writing exclusively in Hebrew. Author Risa Domb praised Avigur-Rotem's analysis of linguistic changes in the language throughout Israel's existence.
