= Gabrio =

Gabrio is an Italian origin word which is used as both a masculine given name and a surname. Notable people with the name include:

== Given name ==
- Gabrio Casati (1798–1873), Italian politician
- Gabrio Castrichella (born 1972), Italian tennis player
- Gabrio Piola (1794–1850), Italian mathematician and physicist
- Gabrio Serbelloni (1509–1580), Italian army general
- Gabrio Zandonà (born 1977), Italian sailor

== Surname ==
- Gabriel Gabrio (1887–1946), French actor
