= Gabriele Poso =

Gabriele Poso (born 22 October 1978) is an independent artist, percussionist, multi-instrumentalist and composer from Lecce, Salento in Italy. In 1998 he began study of percussion at the “Timba” school of music in Rome under Roberto Evangelista.

In 2001, he moved to San Juan, Puerto Rico to continue his musical studies at the Universitad Interamericana De Puerto Rico and a master class at l'Havana Cuba at the Escuela National De Arte. In Puerto Rico he began collaborating with American producer Osunlade and in 2008 released his first solo album From The Genuine World for Yoruba Records.

He performed around the world at the Mod Club Theatre, Toronto for The Canada Day Celebration, the MTV World Festival in Istanbul, the One Day Off Festival in Belgium and clubs such as Jazz Cafe, Neighbourhood and Cargo, in London, Club Djoon in Paris and Una Mas in Montreal.

In 2012 he released solo project Roots of Soul with a single "Sunshine", for German label INFRACom! records. Playing with him were Osunlade and Nailah Porter.

== Discography ==
=== Albums ===
- From The Genuine World Yoruba Records (2008)
- Genuine Remixes Yoruba Records (2008)
- The Yoruba Soul Orchestra – Live Yoruba Records (2012)
- Roots Of Soul INFRACom! (2012)
- Roots Of Soul Remix INFRACom! (2012)
- Invocation Agogo Records (2014)
- "Electric Invocation" Agogo Records (2015)
- "The Languages Of Tambores" BBE records (2017)

=== Appears on ===
- DJ Jazzy Jeff feat. Erro—Rock With You (2002)
- Osunlade—Rebirth (2009)
- Osunlade—Mix the Vibe: King Street Goes Yoruba (2009)
- Louie Vega and Boddhi Satva—Life is a Lesson (2010)
- Various—Yoruba Gold (Osunlade Presents) (2010)
- Various—Sun Set Sessions Deluxe Vol.2 (2010)
- Osunlade—Man ov Wirdz (2011)
- Various—The Hurst Selection Vol.2 (2012)
- Various—Remixed and Recovered (2013)
