= Gaby (singer) =

- Also known as: Gaby El Meneaíto, El Meneaíto, El Meneíto
- Born: Winston Alfaro Brown Jr. October 3, 1965 (age 60); Río Abajo, Panama City, Panama
- Genres: Reggae en Español; Reggaeton; Latin trap
- Occupations: Rapper; Singer; Songwriter
- Instrument: Vocals
- Years active: 1988–1998, 2016–present
- Labels: RCA Records; BMG; Tamayo Records; Kinnaps Records; Jams Records

Winston Alfaro Brown Jr. (born October 3, 1965), better known by his stage name Gaby, is a Panamanian Reggae en Español and Reggaeton singer and rapper. He is also known as El Meneaíto or El Meneíto. He is best known for his 1992 single "Meneaíto" which was a major hit record throughout South and Central America. Gaby left the music scene in 1998. However, he made a return in 2016. Gaby currently resides in Miami Florida.

== Early life ==
Gaby was born on October 3, 1965, in Río Abajo, a corregimiento within the city of Panama City, Panama. Gaby also has two other siblings.

His parents' occupations had a strong influence over the paths Gaby took in life. His father was a professional baseball player and made it to the Triple A Houston Astros. His mother worked in a music store in Panama called Palacio Musical. Gaby also played baseball, as well as soccer, throughout his teenage years. This culminated in him being the captain of his high school soccer team while attending Instituto Técnico Don Bosco.

Gaby also spent a lot of time at work with his mother which exposed him to a wide array of new music on a regular basis. He, along with many other Panamanian youth, was exposed to Jamaican reggae and dancehall artists like Buju Banton, Red Dragon, and Yellowman who were chanting and singing over instrumentals called riddims.

After high school, Gaby majored in graphic design for three years at the Universidad de Panamá before leaving school to begin his music career.

== Career ==
Gaby, as well as many other Panamanian musicians of the day, found inspiration in local artists like Renato who were performing lyrics in español over Jamaican riddims. This style of music, birthed in Panama, was called Reggae en Español and paved the way for Reggaeton. Gaby, and his partner Orlando Lindsay, teamed up for several music-based hustles. They started out hosting parties with Orlando as the DJ and Gaby as the rapper. They used a similar template as the popular local artists in that Orlando would play the instrumental riddims of popular records by Jamaican artists and Gaby freestyled in español over the top.

Gaby and Orlando eventually established a mobile disco called SOS (Super Original Sound) and host picnics at parks during the nighttime called "paseo nocturnos". Gaby and Orlando utilized a unique marketing campaign to generate interest in the picnics.

In 1987, Gaby formed a local group called "Sweet Edition". The group released their self-titled first album with Tamayo Records in 1987. This album contained the original version of "El Meneíto". It was originally recorded over the "Duck Riddim" by the Jamaican record producer, King Jammy. Sweet Edition released a second album called DURO DE MATAR in 1989, but found their music careers disrupted by the United States invasion of Panama.

In 1990, Tamayo Records released "El Meneíto" to other countries through the Colombian label "Discos Fuentes". The song was placed on a compilation that included Latin music such as salsa, merengue and Colombian cumbia. The song became a massive success all throughout South America and Hispanic communities in North America. It spent 11 months as the number one song in Venezuela without Gaby being aware that his record had become a hit.

Gaby was introduced to the Colombian cumbia act, Binomio de Oro de América. Gaby met Luis Phillips and he convinced Gaby to join with other Reggae en Español artists to do a posse cut called "Las 4 Potencias Del Reggae". It featured Gaby, Jam & Suppose, Reggae Sam, and Renato. The group found success and became music ambassadors for Panama. They recorded a compilation album together called INDESTRUCTIBLES 100%. The album was recorded, and produced by Gary H Mason aka: Big Daddy G in the United States at Lazur Studios, and Engineered by Patrick Giraudi. The vocals were recorded in Panama but all the original instrumentation was produced and recorded by Big Daddy G. in the United States. It was distributed internationally by BMG.

This album included newly created and recorded instrumentation and newly created and recorded lyrics of the song entitled "El Meneaíto". This was Gaby's first international hit. The music video “El Meneaito” produced and directed by Gary Mason went on to become a major worldwide hit. Gaby, and the rest of the crew, toured extensively throughout South and Central America for years afterwards. weet Edition would win the Premios Ronda award in Venezuela.

== Comeback ==
In 1995, the relationship between Gaby and his manager, Luis, deteriorated to the point that they were no longer able to work together. Despite his best efforts, Gaby was unable to rebuild the same level of momentum from previous years and was unable to support himself, or his family, as a musician. In 1998, Gaby moved with his family to Germany to make a fresh start. In Germany, he worked as a personal trainer, circling back to the athletic ways of his youth. He remained in Germany for nine years. He moved to Las Vegas in 2007 and worked at the Trump Hotel.

Gaby made intermittent attempts to do music again, but did not become serious about performing until 2016. He received a phone call from a friend from Panama named Alberto Smith. Alberto informed Gaby that the Panama Urban Music Awards wanted to present him with a Lifetime Achievement Award. Gaby was dealing with the loss of his father and the end of his marriage. Gaby attended the Panama Urban Music Awards and was pleasantly surprised to find that he was remembered as an icon of Panamanian urban music.

He returned to reintroduce himself to the Panamanian audience. Alberto also introduced him to Maesa Mazur. Maesa, an urban artist in Ecuador, brought him to Ecuador where he found a receptive audience.

Gaby has recorded and released several new singles, made a number of recent media appearances, and has done a number of live performances since 2016.

== Confusion between Gaby and El General ==
Because they are both from Rio Abajo, are both a part of the same generation of Reggae en Español artists, and El General is considered the international face for Panamanian Reggae music, there has been a bit of confusion as to which of them is the author of "El Meneaíto".

== Discography ==
=== Studio albums ===
- Sweet Edition - Sweet Edition - Tamayo Records (1987)
- Duro de Matar - Sweet Edition - Tamayo Records (1989)
- Meneaíto Vol II - Gaby - RCA Studios (1993)
- Bad Boys - Compilation - Jams Records (1995)

=== Singles ===
- "El Meneíto in Duck Riddim" - Gaby - Tamayo Records (1988)
- "El Meneaíto" - Gaby - BMG/Ragga Force (1990)
- "Jump Dance" - Gaby - Kinnaps Records (1993)
- "Instinto Animal" - Gaby - SR (2017)
- "Ella Quiere" - Gaby - SR (2018)
