= Gabriella Gatti =

Italian operatic soprano

- Gabriella Gatti (photo with 1943 dedication)
- Occupation: opera soprano singer

Gabriella Gatti (July 5, 1908 – October 22, 2003) was an Italian operatic soprano, primarily based in Italy and associated with the Italian repertory.

Born Gabriella Pesci in Rome, where she studied voice and piano. She made her stage debut in 1934, at the Teatro dell'Opera di Roma in Monteverdi's Orfeo. Thereafter she quickly appeared in all the major opera houses throughout Italy, most often in Rome and Florence, but also sang at the Teatro alla Scala in Milan, from 1938 to 1947. She was admired in roles such as; Countess Almaviva, Semiramide, Mathilde, Desdemona, etc.

She sang Marie at the Italian premiere of Wozzeck in Rome, in 1942.

She can be heard in a few recordings, notably in Le nozze di Figaro, opposite Sesto Bruscantini, Alda Noni, Italo Tajo, and as Fenena in Nabucco.

== Sources ==
- Grove Music Online, Rodolfo Celletti, Oxford University Press, April 2008.
