= Gabriele Wurzel =

German lawyer, administrative officer and politician

Gabriele Wurzel (born 17 September 1948 in Offenbach am Main) is a German lawyer, administrative officer and politician (CDU). After graduating from high school in Wiesbaden in 1967, she began law studies at the universities in Mainz and Würzburg, which she completed in 1972 with the First State Law Examination. She has occupied different administrative offices, like from 1990 to 1991, she was State Secretary at the Ministry of the Interior of Rhineland-Palatinate, State Secretary and Head of the State Chancellery of Mecklenburg-Vorpommern from 1992 to 1994 and State Secretary for Federal Affairs and Plenipotentiaries of the Federal State of Mecklenburg-Vorpommern from 1994 to 1998.
