= Gabriele Kaiser =

German mathematics educator

Gabriele Kaiser is a German mathematics educator. She is a professor of mathematics education at the University of Hamburg.

Kaiser completed a doctorate in 1986 and a habilitation in 1997 at the University of Kassel. Her doctoral dissertation, Anwendungen im Mathematikunterricht - Konzeptionen und Untersuchungen zur unterrichtlichen Realisierung, was supervised by Werner Blum. She became a professor at Hamburg in 1998, and served as vice dean of education from 2010 to 2016. Since 2005 she has been editor-in-chief of the journal ZDM Mathematics Education, and she is the editor or co-editor of 28 books on mathematics education.

Kaiser was a speaker at the 2002 International Congress of Mathematicians. In 2012, a festschrift was published in her honor.
