= Gabriela N =

- Born: Gabriela Ann Xuereb; 18 March 1993 (age 33); Xewkija, Gozo, Malta.
- Genres: Dance-pop; Electropop; Pop; Dubstep; Hip hop; Rock; Urban
- Occupations: Singer-songwriter; rapper; dancer; activist
- Instruments: Vocals
- Years active: 2001–present

Gabriela N (Italian pronunciation: [ˌɡabriˈɛn]) (born Gabriela Ann Xuereb; 18 March 1993) is a Gozitan singer, songwriter, rapper, model and activist.

== Career ==
In 2010, Gabriela entered Malta EuroSong for the first time and made it to the Top 50 (Phase 2) with two songs. That same year, she released a single entitled "Where Are You Now" and her debut album Rising Star, with lyrics in both Maltese and English. Gabriela was a supporting act for The Cheeky Girls in early 2011, and later that year she was featured on the Malta to Midem compilation album alongside 17 other Maltese artists.

In 2014, the World Academy of Arts, Literature, and Media chose Gabriela to represent Malta in an international musical project.

Gabriela recorded "Walk in Style", a message song dedicated to victims of bullying. Gabriela released another single, "Lie to Me", in late 2016.

== Personal life ==
Gabriela has an older brother, Ivan (born 1987). She is reportedly related to Monsignor Alfred Xuereb.

== Discography ==
- Rising Star (2010)
- WALK IN STYLE (2014)
- LIE TO ME (2016)
