= Kenny Porpora =

American activist

Kenny Porpora (born 1987) is an American author, speaker, and LGBTQ+ advocate.

His first book, The Autumn Balloon, was published in 2015 by Hachette Book Group. USA Today gave the book four out of four stars and said "Porpora's coming-of-age memoir is a brilliant debut from a fine writer with an intriguing way of viewing the world. It's also a story of how the hand a kid is dealt need not foretell his destiny." Kirkus Reviews called the memoir "a piercing first book".

The Autumn Balloon was unanimously selected for the Target Book Club and became a New York Times bestseller in the non-fiction category. As of 2026, the memoir has sold more than 100,000 copies.

Porpora has worked as a ghostwriter and developmental editor for Hachette Book Group, Penguin Random House, Wiley & Sons, and Amazon/Topple, and he has collaborated with Creative Artists Agency. His essays can be found in The New York Times, Newsweek, BuzzFeed and Salon.

== Personal life ==
Porpora is gay and lives with obsessive–compulsive disorder and autism.
