= Gabriele Preuß =

German politician

Gabriele Preuß MEP

Member of the European Parliament
- In office 2014–2019
- Constituency: Germany

Personal details
- Born: 27 September 1954 (age 71) Dortmund, North Rhine-Westphalia, Germany
- Party: German; Social Democratic Party; European Union; Party of European Socialists

Gabriele Preuß (born 27 September 1954) is a German politician who served as a Member of the European Parliament (MEP) from 2014 until 2019. She is a member of the Social Democratic Party, part of the Party of European Socialists.

== Life ==
Prior to entering European politics, Preuß undertook training at the Westphalia Chamber of Trades and the Northern Westphalia Chamber of Industry and Trade. She became a master craftsman and also later worked in administration. She was also involved in local politics, serving as a Member of Gelsenkirchen Municipal Council from 1999 until 2014. This included serving as Mayor from 2004 until 2014.

== Parliamentary service ==
- Member, Committee on Petitions (2014-2019)
- Member, Committee on Transport and Tourism (2014-2019)
- Member, Delegation to the EU-Turkey Joint Parliamentary Committee (2014-2019)
- Member, Delegation to the ACP–EU Joint Parliamentary Assembly (2016-2019)

In addition to her committee assignments, Preuß served as a member of the European Parliament Intergroup on Western Sahara.

== Other activities ==
- German United Services Trade Union (ver.di), Member
- Socialist Youth of Germany – Falcons, Member
