= Gabriele Lesser =

German journalist (born 1960)

- Born: 16 May 1960 (age 66); Frankfurt, West Germany
- Occupations: Historian, journalist

Gabriele Alexandra Lesser (born 16 May 1960 in Frankfurt am Main) is a historian and journalist, who specializes in the history of World War II and the occupation of Poland, the Baltic countries, and Ukraine 1939–1945.

As Warsaw-based correspondent of newspapers published in Germany (Die Tageszeitung), Austria (Der Standard), and Switzerland (Tages-Anzeiger) she publishes regularly news and analysis about Ukraine, Poland, Estonia, Latvia, Lithuania, and the Kaliningrad oblast. She wrote and edited several books about the contemporary Poland, the history of the Underground University in Kraków in World War II and a guidebook about Masuria and the Masurian Lake District.
