= Gabriela Mistral =

Chilean author and diplomat (1889–1957)

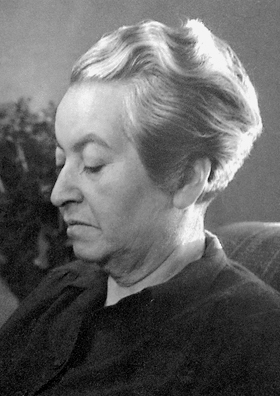
- Born: Lucila de María del Perpetuo Socorro Godoy Alcayaga; 7 April 1889; Vicuña, Chile
- Died: 10 January 1957 (aged 67); Hempstead, New York
- Occupations: Educator, Diplomat, Poet.
- Writing career
- Language: Spanish
- Period: 1914–1957
- Notable awards: Nobel Prize in Literature; 1945
- Gabriela Mistral's voice Recorded c. 1940-57

Lucila Godoy Alcayaga (Latin American Spanish: [luˈsila ɣoˈðoj alkaˈʝaɣa]; 7 April 1889 – 10 January 1957), known by her pseudonym Gabriela Mistral (Spanish: [ɡaˈβɾjela misˈtɾal]), was a Chilean poet-diplomat, journalist and educator. She read widely in theosophy, became a member of the secular or Third Franciscan order in 1925, but rarely attended mass. She was the first Latin American author to receive a Nobel Prize in Literature in 1945, "for her lyric poetry which, inspired by powerful emotions, has made her name a symbol of the idealistic aspirations of the entire Latin American world". Some central themes in her poems are nature, betrayal, love, a mother's love, sorrow and recovery, travel, and Latin American identity as formed from a mixture of Native American and European influences. She also wrote an immense body of prose, about 800 articles that circulated throughout the Spanish-speaking world, on a range of topics: geography, education, profiles of her fellow writers, politics, and more. Her image is featured on the 5,000 Chilean peso banknote.

== Early life ==
Mistral was born in Vicuña, Chile, but grew up in Montegrande, an Andean village where she attended a primary school taught by her older sister, Emelina Molina. Despite the financial problems caused by Emelina later on, Mistral held great respect for her. Her father, Juan Gerónimo Godoy Villanueva, was also a schoolteacher but deserted the family when she was three years old and died alone and estranged in 1911. Poverty was a constant presence in her early life. Although her family's poverty and frequent moves kept her from regularly attending school, at the age of fifteen she began supporting herself and her mother, Petronila Alcayaga, a seamstress, by working as a teacher's aide in Compañía Baja, a seaside town near La Serena, Chile.

From 1904 to 1908, Mistral published some early poems, including Ensoñaciones ("Dreams"), Carta Íntima ("Intimate Letter"), and Junto al Mar ("By the Sea"), in the local newspapers El Coquimbo: Diario Radical and La Voz de Elqui, using different pseudonyms and variations of her name.

In 1906, Mistral might have met Romelio Ureta, a railway worker, who took his own life in 1909. Whether the poet had any direction connection with Ureta is murky: subsequent investigators have cast doubt on the episode, which her closest family members denied. The emotions reflected on this suicide are marked in other poems that she later published as Desolación (1922), her first volume which was and is still celebrated throughout the Spanish-speaking world. Mistral won first prize in the national literary contest Juegos Florales held in Santiago, the capital of Chile. Exploring themes of death and life more broadly than previous Latin American poets, she expanded her poetic horizons. While Mistral had passionate friendships with both men and women, which influenced her writing, she kept her emotional life private.

After winning the Juegos Florales, she rarely used her given name, Lucila Godoy, for her publications. She constructed her pseudonym from the names of two of her favorite poets, Gabriele D'Annunzio and Frédéric Mistral, the French winner of the 1904 Nobel Prize in Literature, or, according to another account, as a combination of the Archangel Gabriel and the mistral wind of Provence.

In 1922, Mistral published her debut book, Desolación ("Desolation"), with assistance from Federico de Onis, the director of the Hispanic Institute of New York. The collection of poems explored themes such as motherhood, religion, nature, morality, and love for children. Her personal sorrows were reflected in the poems, solidifying her international reputation. Departing from the modernist trends in Latin America, Mistral's work was hailed by critics as straightforward yet simplistic. Two years later, in 1924, she released her second book, Ternura ("Tenderness").

== Career as an educator ==
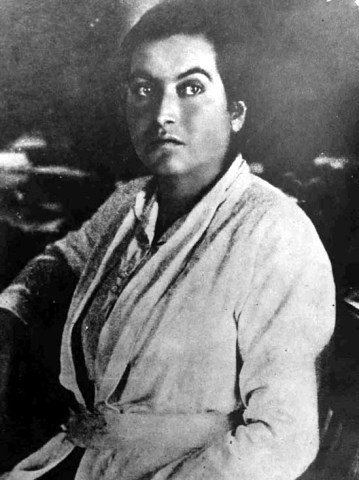
Gabriela Mistral during her youth

During her adolescence, the scarcity of trained teachers, especially in rural areas, allowed anyone willing to work to find employment as a teacher. However, the young woman faced challenges in accessing good schools due to her lack of political and social connections. In 1907, she was rejected from the Normal School without explanation, which she later attributed to the school's chaplain, Father Ignacio Munizaga, who was aware of her publications advocating for educational reform and increased access to schools for all social classes.

Although her formal education ended in 1900, she secured teaching positions with the help of her older sister, Emelina, who had likewise begun as a teacher's aide and was responsible for much of the poet's early education. Through her publications in local and national newspapers and magazines, as well as her willingness to relocate, she advanced from one teaching position to another. Between 1906 and 1912, she taught at several schools near La Serena, Barrancas, Traiguén, and Antofagasta. In 1912, she began working at a liceo (high school) in Los Andes, where she remained for six years, frequently visiting Santiago. In 1918, Pedro Aguirre Cerda, the Minister of Education and future President of Chile, appointed her as the director of the Sara Braun Lyceum in Punta Arenas. She subsequently moved to Temuco in 1920 and then to Santiago in 1921, defeating a candidate associated with the Radical Party to become the director of Santiago's Liceo #6, the country's newest and most prestigious girls' school.

The controversy surrounding Gabriela Mistral's nomination for the coveted position in Santiago influenced her decision to accept an invitation to work in Mexico in 1922, under the guidance of Mexico's Minister of Education, José Vasconcelos. There, she contributed to the nation's plan to reform libraries and schools and establish a national education system. During this time, she gained international recognition through her journalism, public speaking, and the publication of her work Desolación in New York. She later published Lecturas para Mujeres (Readings for Women), a collection of prose and verse celebrating girls' education, featuring works by Latin American and European writers.

After spending nearly two years in Mexico, Mistral traveled to Washington D.C., where she addressed the Pan American Union, and then continued her journey to New York and Europe. In Madrid, she published Ternura (Tenderness), a collection of lullabies and rondas intended for children, parents, and fellow poets. She returned to Chile in early 1925, formally retiring from the country's education system and receiving a pension. Just in time, as the legislature had recently granted the demands of the teachers' union, led by Mistral's rival Amanda Labarca Hubertson, stipulating that only university-trained teachers could be appointed in schools. Despite her limited formal education, Mistral received the academic title of Spanish Professor from the University of Chile in 1923, which highlighted her remarkable self-education and her intellectual abilities, nurtured by the vibrant culture of newspapers, magazines, and books in provincial Chile.

Pablo Neruda, Chile's second Nobel Prize laureate in literature, met Mistral when she relocated to his hometown, Temuco. She introduced him to her poetry and recommended readings, leading to a lifelong friendship between the two poets.

== International work and recognition ==
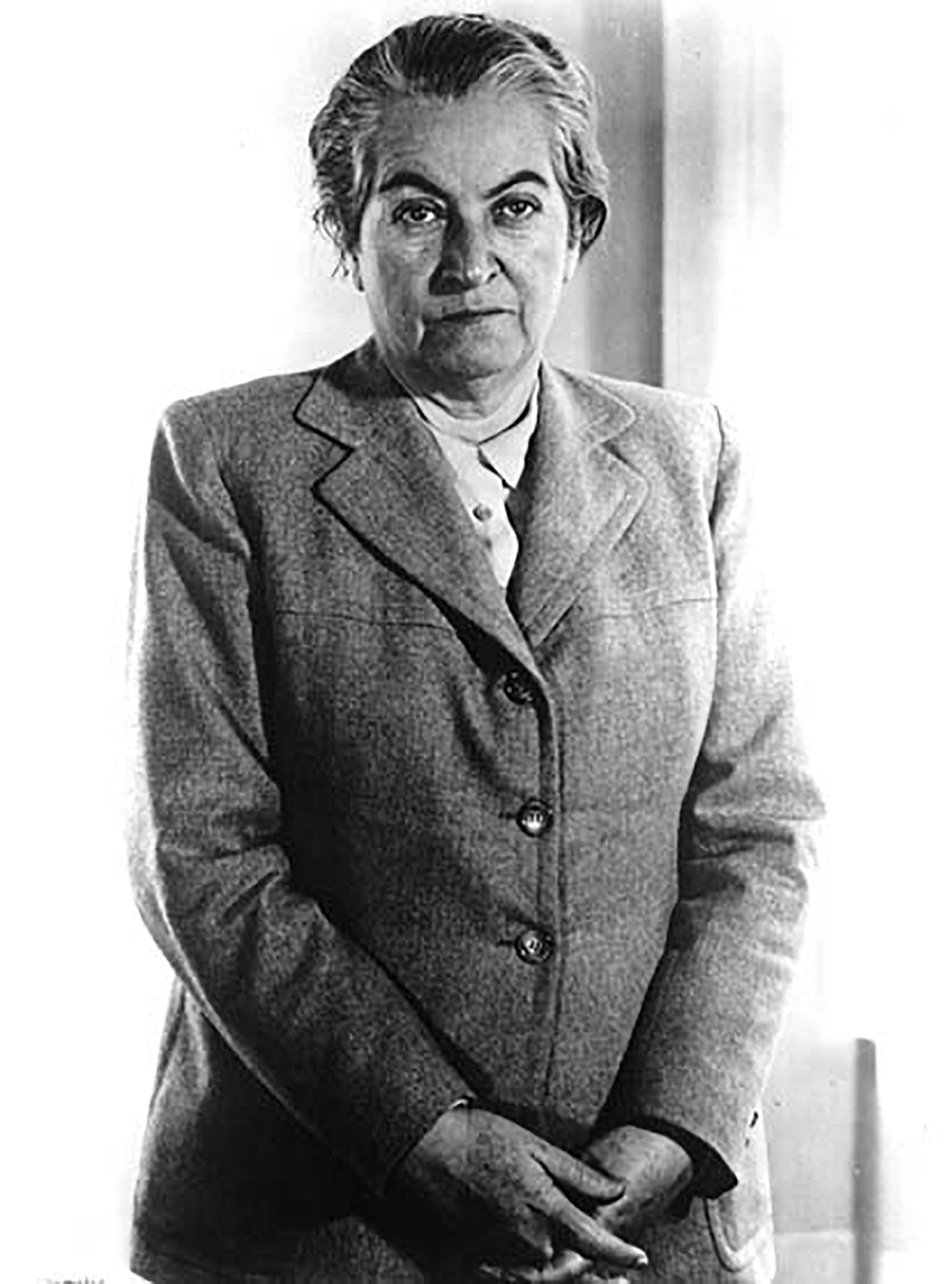
Gabriela during the 1950s

Mistral's international stature made it unlikely for her to remain in Chile. In mid-1925, she was invited to represent Latin America in the newly formed Institute for Intellectual Cooperation of the League of Nations. In early 1926, she relocated to France, effectively becoming an exile for the rest of her life. Initially, she made a living through journalism and giving lectures in the United States and Latin America, including Puerto Rico, the Caribbean, Brazil, Uruguay, and Argentina.

Between 1926 and 1932, Mistral primarily resided in France and Italy. During this period, she worked for the League for Intellectual Cooperation of the League of Nations, attending conferences throughout Europe and the Americas. She held a visiting professorship at Barnard College of Columbia University in 1930–1931, briefly worked at Middlebury College and Vassar College in 1931, and received a warm reception at the University of Puerto Rico at Rio Piedras, where she gave conferences and wrote in 1931, 1932, and 1933.

Like many Latin American artists and intellectuals, Mistral served as a consul from 1932 until her death, working in various locations including Naples, Madrid, Lisbon, Nice, Petrópolis, Los Angeles, Santa Barbara, Veracruz, Rapallo, and New York City. While serving as consul in Madrid, she had occasional professional interactions with fellow Chilean consul and Nobel Prize recipient Pablo Neruda. Mistral was among the early writers to recognize the importance and originality of Neruda's work, which she had read since he was a teenager and she a school director in his hometown of Temuco.

Mistral published hundreds of articles in magazines and newspapers throughout the Spanish-speaking world. She had notable confidants such as Eduardo Santos, President of Colombia, all the elected Presidents of Chile from 1922 to her death in 1957, Eduardo Frei Montalva (who would be elected president in 1964), and Eleanor Roosevelt.

Her second major volume of poetry, Tala, was published in 1938 in Buenos Aires with the assistance of her longtime friend and correspondent Victoria Ocampo. The proceeds from the sale were dedicated to children orphaned by the Spanish Civil War. This volume contains poems that celebrate the customs and folklore of Latin America and Mediterranean Europe, reflecting Mistral's identification as "una mestiza de vasco", acknowledging her European Basque-Indigenous Amerindian background.

On 14 August 1943, Mistral's 17-year-old nephew, Juan Miguel Godoy, whom she considered as a son and called Yin Yin, took his own life. The grief from this loss, along with her responses to the tensions of World War II and the Cold War in Europe and the Americas, are reflected in her last volume of poetry published during her lifetime, Lagar, which appeared in a truncated form in 1954. Her partner Doris Dana edited and published a final volume of poetry, Poema de Chile, posthumously in 1967. Poema de Chile depicts the poet's return to Chile after death, accompanied by an indigenous boy from the Atacama desert and an Andean deer, the huemul. This collection of poetry foreshadows the interest in objective description and re-vision of the epic tradition that would emerge among poets of the Americas, all of whom Mistral carefully read.

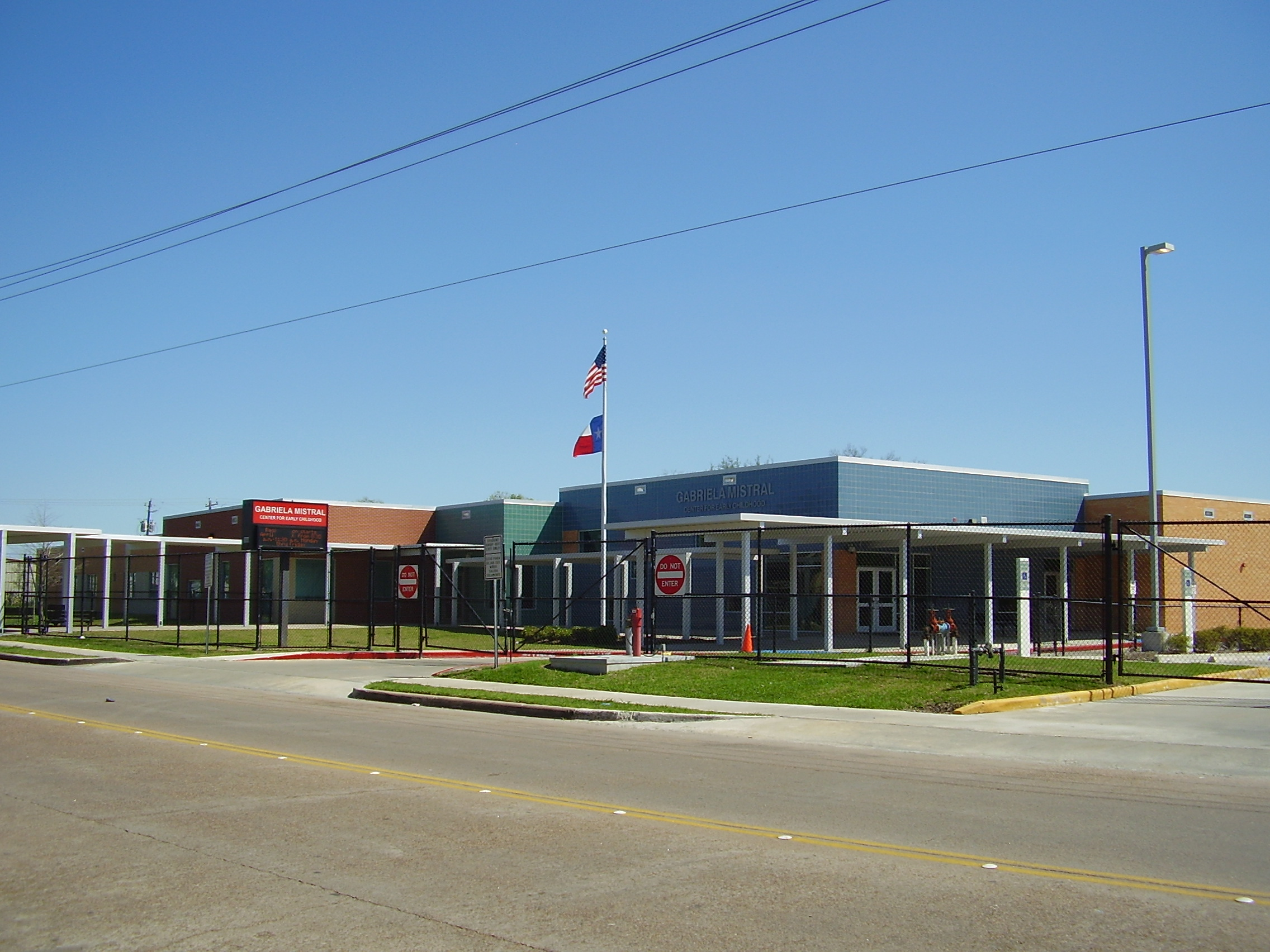
Gabriela Mistral Early Childhood Center in Houston

On 15 November 1945, Mistral became the first Latin American and the fifth woman to receive the Nobel Prize in Literature. King Gustav of Sweden presented her with the award in person on 10 December 1945. In 1947, she received an honorary doctorate from Mills College in Oakland, California. In 1951, she was awarded the National Literature Prize in Chile.

Poor health limited Mistral's travel in her final years. She resided in the town of Roslyn, New York, and then transferred to Hempstead, New York, where she died from pancreatic cancer on 10 January 1957 at the age of 67. Her remains were returned to Chile nine days later, and the Chilean government declared three days of national mourning, with hundreds of thousands of mourners paying their respects.

Some of Mistral's best-known poems include Piececitos de Niño, Balada, Todas Íbamos a ser Reinas, La Oración de la Maestra, El Ángel Guardián, Decálogo del Artista, and La Flor del Aire. She also wrote and published approximately 800 essays in magazines and newspapers. Mistral was renowned as a correspondent and highly regarded orator, both in person and through radio broadcasts.

Mistral may be most widely quoted in English for Su Nombre es Hoy ("His Name is Today"):

We are guilty of many errors and many faults, but our worst crime is abandoning the children, neglecting the fountain of life. Many of the things we need can wait. The child cannot. Right now is the time his bones are being formed, his blood is being made, and his senses are being developed. To him we cannot answer 'Tomorrow,' his name is today.

== Characteristics of her work ==
Mistral's work incorporates gray tones and conveys recurring feelings of sadness and bitterness, reflecting her difficult childhood marked by deprivation and a lack of affection at home. Despite this, her writings also reveal her deep affection for children, which she developed during her early years as a teacher in a rural school. Catholicism, a significant influence in Mistral's life, is also evident in her literature; however, she maintains a neutral stance toward religion. Her writing skillfully combines religious themes with emotions of love and piety, solidifying her position as one of the most esteemed representatives of Latin American literature in the 20th century.

== Death, posthumous tributes and legacy ==
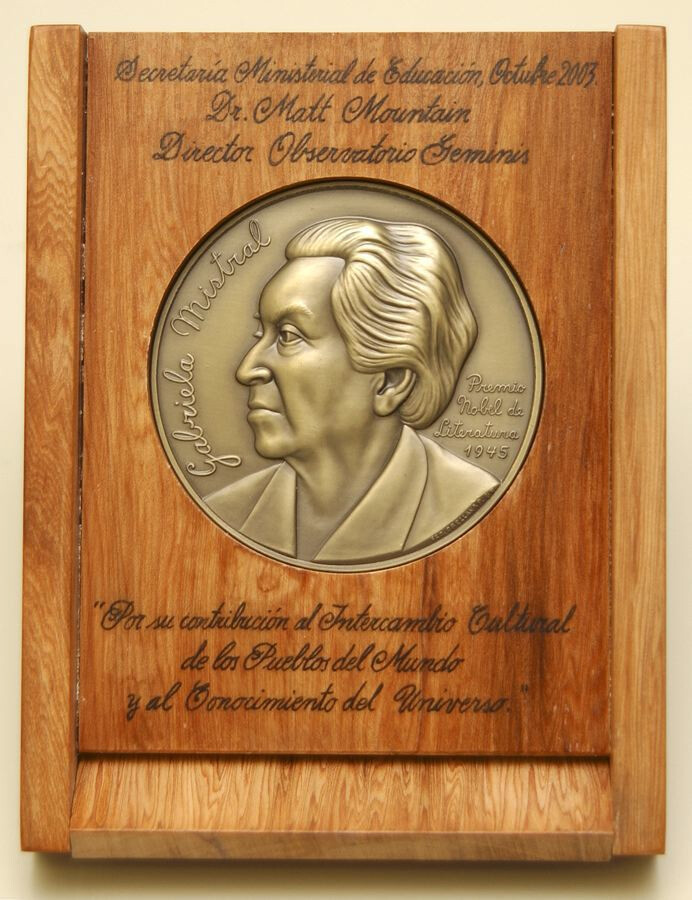
Gabriela Mistral Medal given to Matt Mountain

During the 1970s and 1980s, the military dictatorship of General Augusto Pinochet appropriated Gabriela Mistral's image, portraying her as a symbol of "submission to authority" and "social order". Author Licia Fiol-Matta challenged the traditional views of Mistral as a saint-like celibate and suffering heterosexual woman, suggesting that she was a lesbian instead. In 2007, after the death of Mistral's alleged last romantic partner, Doris Dana, her archive was discovered, containing letters exchanged between Mistral and various occasional female lovers. The publication of these letters in the book Niña errante (2007), edited by Pedro Pablo Zegers, supported the notion of a long-lasting romantic relationship between Mistral and Dana during Mistral's final years. The letters were later translated into English by Velma García and published by the University of New Mexico Press in 2018. Despite these claims, Doris Dana, who was 31 years younger than Mistral, explicitly denied in her final interview that their relationship was ever romantic or erotic, describing it as that of a stepmother and stepdaughter. Dana also denied being a lesbian and expressed skepticism regarding Mistral's sexual orientation.

Mistral suffered from diabetes and heart problems, and she ultimately died of pancreatic cancer at the age of 67 on 10 January 1957, in Hempstead Hospital on Long Island, New York, with Doris Dana by her side.

On 7 April 2015, Google commemorated Gabriela Mistral's 126th birthday, honoring the Chilean poet and educator with a special doodle.

== Themes ==
Gabriela Mistral has greatly influenced Latin American poetry. In a powerful speech by Swedish writer Hjalmar Gullberg, a member of the Swedish Academy, he provided insights into the perspective and emotions of Gabriela Mistral. Gullberg discussed how the language of troubadours, once unintelligible to Frédéric Mistral's own mother, became the language of poetry. This language continued to thrive with the birth of Gabriela Mistral, whose voice shook the world and opened the eyes and ears of those willing to listen.

Gullberg noted that after experiencing the suicide of her first love, Gabriela Mistral emerged as a poet whose words spread across South America and beyond. While little is known about her first love, his death influenced Mistral's poems, which often explored themes of death, despair, and possibly a resentment towards God. Her collection of poems titled Desolación, inspired by the loss of her first love and later the death of a beloved nephew, impacted many others. The fifteenth poem in Desolación expressed sorrow for the loss of a child and resonated with those who experienced the pain of losing loved ones.

However, Gabriela Mistral's books do not solely focus on themes of death, desolation, and loss. She also explored themes of love and motherhood, not only in relation to her beloved railroad employee and nephew but also in her interactions with the children she taught. Her collection of songs and rounds, titled Ternura, reflects her love for the children in her school. Published in Madrid in 1924, these heartfelt words were embraced by four thousand Mexican children who sang them as a tribute to Mistral. Her dedication to her children earned her the title of the Poet of Motherhood.

Having lived through two world wars and other violent conflicts, Mistral's experiences paved the way for her third major collection, Tala (meaning "ravage" according to Gullberg). Tala encompasses a blend of sacred hymns, simple songs for children, and poems that touch on subjects like water, corn, salt, and wine. Gullberg pays homage to Mistral, acknowledging her as the great singer of sorrow and motherhood in Latin America. Mistral's collections of poems and songs beautifully express her care for children and the sorrows she endured as a teacher and poet in Latin America. Every word in her work evokes themes of sorrow and motherhood.

== Awards and honors ==
- 1914: Juegos Florales, Sonetos de la Muerte
- 1945: Nobel Prize in Literature
- 1951: Chilean National Prize for Literature

The Venezuelan writer and diplomat who worked under the name Lucila Palacios took her nom de plume in honour of Mistral's original name.

== Works ==
- 1914: Sonetos de la muerte ("Sonnets of Death")
- 1922: Desolación ("Despair"), including "Decalogo del artista", New York : Instituto de las Españas
- 1923: Lecturas para Mujeres ("Readings for Women")
- 1924: Ternura: canciones de niños, Madrid: Saturnino Calleja
- 1934: Nubes Blancas y Breve Descripción de Chile (1934)
- 1938: Tala ("Harvesting"), Buenos Aires: Sur
- 1941: Antología: Selección de Gabriela Mistral, Santiago, Chile: Zig Zag
- 1952: Los sonetos de la muerte y otros poemas elegíacos, Santiago, Chile: Philobiblion
- 1954: Lagar, Santiago, Chile
- 1957: Recados: Contando a Chile, Santiago, Chile: Editorial del PacíficoCroquis mexicanos; Gabriela Mistral en México, México City: Costa-Amic
- 1958: Poesías completas, Madrid : Aguilar
- 1967: Poema de Chile ("Poem of Chile"), published posthumously
- 1992: Lagar II, published posthumously, Santiago, Chile: Biblioteca Nacional

== Works translated into other languages ==
=== English ===
Several selections of Mistral's poetry have been published in English translation, including those by Doris Dana, Langston Hughes, and Ursula K. Le Guin.

- Selected Poems of Gabriela Mistral, trans. Langston Hughes (Bloomington: Indiana University Press, 1957)
- Selected poems of Gabriela Mistral, trans. Doris Dana (Johns Hopkins Press, 1971), ISBN 978-0801811975
- Selected Poems of Gabriela Mistral, trans. Ursula Le Guin (University of New Mexico Press, 2003), ISBN 978-0826328182
- Madwomen: The Locas mujeres Poems of Gabriela Mistral, trans. Randall Couch (University of Chicago Press, 2008, paper 2009), ISBN 978-0-226-53191-5
- Gabriela Mistral: This Far Place, trans. John Gallas, Contemplative Poetry 8 (Oxford: SLG Press, 2023), ISBN 978-0728303409
- "Fog", trans. Stuart Cooke In Virginia's Sisters: An Anthology of Women's Writing, (London: Aurora Metro Books, 2023), ISBN 9781912430789

Two editions of her first book of poems, Desolación, have been translated into English and appear in bilingual volumes.

- Desolation: A Bilingual Edition of Desolación (1923), trans. Michael P. Predmore and Liliana Baltra (Pittsburgh: Latin American Literary Review Press, 2014), ISBN 9781891270246
- Desolación (1922): Centennial Bilingual Edition, trans. Inés Bellina, Anne Freeland, and Alejandra Quintana Arocho, (New York: Sundial House, Columbia University Press, 2023), ISBN 9798987926437

=== Nepali ===
Some of Mistral's poems are translated into Nepali by Suman Pokhrel, and collected in an anthology titled Manpareka Kehi Kavita.

== See also ==
- Barnard College, repository for part of Mistral's personal library, given by Doris Dana in 1978.
- Gabriela Mistral mine, copper mine in Chile's Atacama Desert
- List of female Nobel laureates
- NGC 3324, together with IC 2599 known as the Gabriela Mistral Nebula
