= Gabriella Porpora =

Italian multimedia artist (born 1942)

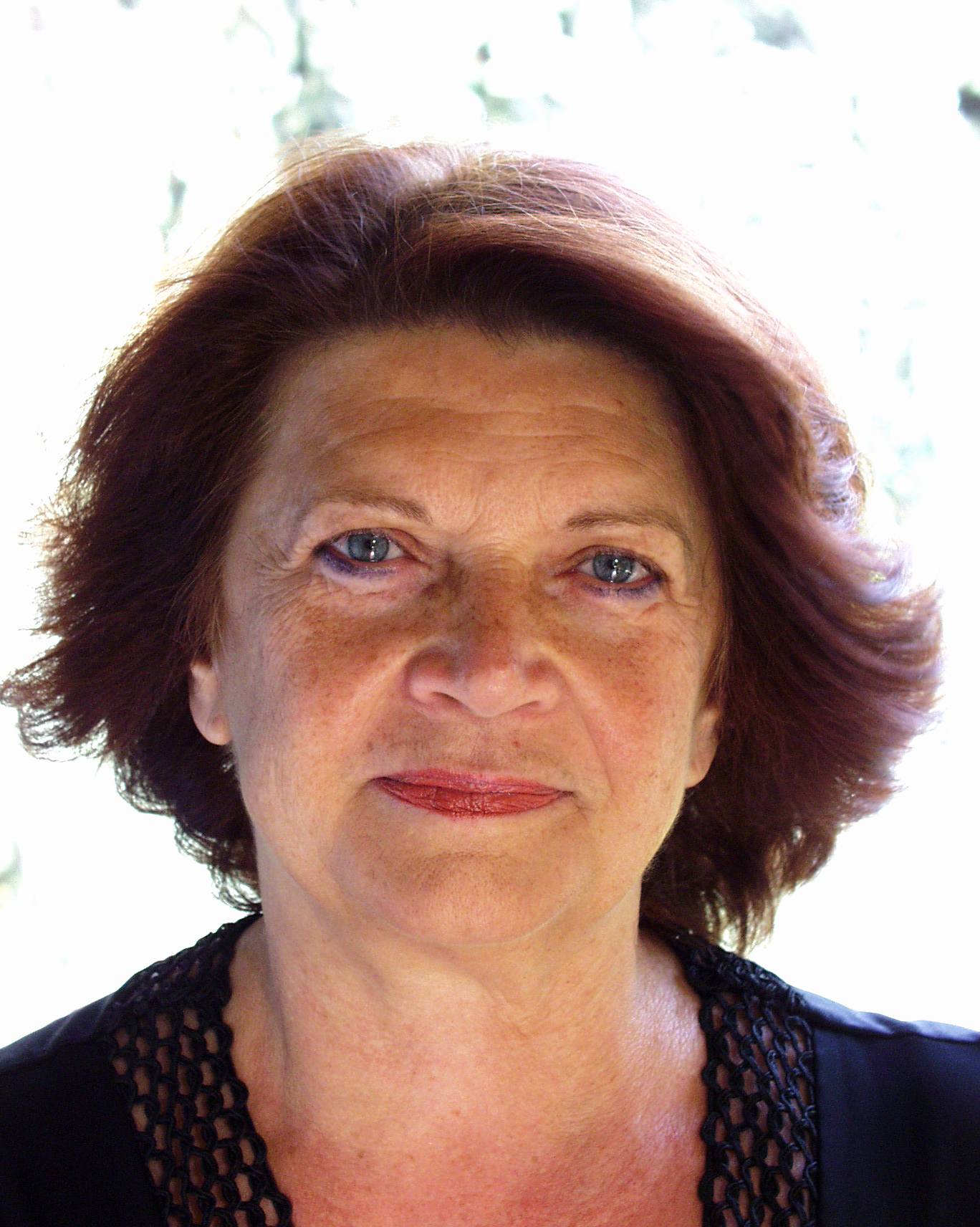
- Porpora in 2004
- Born: Gabriella Porpora; 22 June 1942 (age 83); Rome, Italy
- Education: Academy of Fine Arts, Rome
- Known for: Painting
- Movement: Informal Art, Poor Art, Land Art
- Awards: Arte Dannata
- Patrons: Giorgio de Chirico, Francis Bacon (painter), Robert Rauschenberg, Marcel Duchamp

Gabriella Porpora (born 22 June 1942) is an Italian multimedia artist who works with paint, plexiglass, and wood.

== Life ==
Porpora was born in Rome to a Roman mother and a Neapolitan father, she founded with 12 other artists, the Gruppo 12 art movement. Her artwork can be inserted in the steps of Avant-garde art movements. Her artworks are experimental, often innovative.

She has sculpted original art-crafts called "Pictoscultures". She is still active in many exhibitions, primarily in Italy.

== Selected works ==
- In volo, SunShine and Seduction (2003)
