= Gabriele Manganaro =

Gabriele Manganaro is an electrical engineer at MediaTek Inc. in Woburn, Massachusetts, USA. He was named a Fellow of the Institute of Electrical and Electronics Engineers (IEEE) in 2016 for his work in the design of high-speed data converters.
