= Gabi =

Gabi or GABI may refer to:

== People ==
=== Women ===
- Gabi or Gabbriette, American model and musician Gabriella Leigh Bechtel (born 1997)
- Gabrielle Gabi Ash (born 1998), Australian freestyle skier
- Elisha Gabriell Gabi Bade (born 1996), Filipina basketball player
- Gabriela Gabi Barbieri (born 2003), Brazilian professional football goalkeeper
- Gabi Bauer (born 1962), German journalist and television presenter
- Gabi Burgstaller (born 1963), Austrian politician
- Gabriella Gabi Butler (born 1998), American cheerleader, YouTuber and television personality
- Gabi Canales (fl. 2003–2005), American politician and attorney
- Gabriele Gabi Dachs, Namibian-born New Zealand academic and cancer researcher
- Gabriella Gabi DeMartino (born 1995), American singer-songwriter
- Gabi DiCarlo (born 1985), American stock car racing driver
- Gabrielle Gabi Garcia (born 1985), Brazilian mixed martial artist and grappler
- Gabriela Gabi Gonçalves (born 1999), Brazilian politician
- Gabriela Guimarães (born 1994), Brazilian volleyball player
- Gabi Habetz, German racing cyclist, German National Road Race champion in 1981
- Gabrielle Gabi Hollows (born 1953), Australian orthoptist
- Gabi Jacobs (born 1996), American discus thrower
- Gabriela Gabi Moura (born 2004), Brazilian influencer
- Gabriela Gabi Mazetto (born 1997), also known as simply Gabi, Brazilian skateboarder
- Gabriela Gabi Müller (born 1974), Swiss sprint canoer in the mid-1990s
- Gabi Ngcobo, 21st-century South African curator, artist and educator
- Gabrijela Gabi Novak (1936–2025), Croatian pop and jazz singer
- Gabriela Gabi Nunes (born 1997), Brazilian footballer
- Gabrieli Gabi Pessanha (born 2000), Brazilian jiu-jitsu grappler
- Gabrielle Gabi Portilho (born 1995), Brazilian footballer
- Gabrielle Gabi Rennie (born 2001), New Zealand footballer
- Gabriele Gabi Rockmeier (born 1973), German sprinter
- Gabriele Gabi Roth (born 1967), German hurdler
- Gabi Schottroff (born 1997), Swiss volleyball player
- Gabriela Szabo (born 1975), Romanian middle-distance runner
- Gabriella Gabi Tóth (born 1988), Hungarian television personality, dancer and singer
- Gabriele Gabi Weber (born 1955), German politician
- Gabriella or Gabi Wilson (born 1997), stage name H.E.R., American R&B singer-songwriter
- Gabriele Gabi Zange (born 1961), East German speed skater
- Gabriela Gabi Zanotti (born 1985), Brazilian footballer
- Gabriele Gabi Zimmer (born 1955), German politician
- Marília Gabriela (born 1948), also known as just Gabi, Brazilian journalist, TV host, actress, writer and former singer

=== Men ===
- Gabi (footballer, born 1981), Portuguese footballer Gabriel José Pinto Couto
- Gabi (footballer, born 1983), Spanish footballer Gabriel Fernández Arenas
- Gabi (footballer, born 2000), Portuguese footballer Márcio Gabriel Ferreira Pereira
- Gabriel Gabi Ashkenazi (born 1954), Israeli general and politician
- Gavril Gabi Balint (born 1963), Romanian sports pundit and former football manager and player
- Gabi Adrian Boitan (born 1999), Romanian tennis player
- Gabriel Gabi Delgado-López (1958–2020), Spanish-born German singer, composer, lyricist, producer and co-founder of the German electronic band Deutsch Amerikanische Freundschaft
- Gavriel Gabi Kanichowsky (born 1997), Israeli footballer
- Gabriel Gabi Le Roux, South African keyboardist, composer and music producer
- Gabriel Gabi Neumark (1946–2000), Israeli basketball player
- Gabriel Gabi Teichner (born 1945), Israeli basketball player
- Gabriel Popescu (footballer) (born 1973), Romanian footballer
- Gabriel Gabi Riera (born 1985), Andorran footballer
- Gabriel Silva (footballer, born 1997), also known as simply Gabi, Brazilian footballer
- Gabriel Tamaș (born 1983), Romanian footballer
- Gabriel Gabi Tolkowsky (1939–2023), Belgian-Israeli diamond cutter
- Gabi Hun, a stage name of American rock musician Gábor Szakácsi (born 1990)
- Gabi Gazit, Israeli journalist, television personality and radio host born Gabriel Greenstein (born 1947)
- Diosdado Gabi (born 1979), Filipino boxer

== Arts and entertainment ==
- Gabi (film), a 2012 South Korean film
- Gabi Braun, a character in the Attack on Titan Japanese manga series
- Gabi Hernandez, a character in the soap opera Days of Our Lives
- Gabi Martinez, a character in the soap opera Sunset Beach
- The protagonist of Gabi on the Roof in July, a 2010 American independent film

== Places ==
- Gabi, Niger, a commune and village
- Gabi, Bohol, a barangay in Ubay, Bohol, Philippines
- A barangay in Cordova, Cebu, Philippines
- Mount Gabi, an underwater mountain near the southwestern tip of Western Australia

== Other uses ==
- Gabi (clothing), a blanket made of chiffon used in Ethiopia
- Gabi (dog), a German Shepherd who became famous for fighting an escaped zoo jaguar in 1987
- Gabi (elephant) (born 2005), first elephant conceived in Israel through artificial insemination
- Gabi (robot), a South Korean AI-powered humanoid robot
- Ficus pleurocarpa, a fig also known as the gabi fig
- Great American Biotic Interchange (GABI), a paleozoographic event resulting from the formation of the Isthmus of Panama
- A term for taro in the Philippines

== See also ==
- Gabi-Gabi language, a language of Queensland, Australia
- Gabii, in Latium, Italy
- Gaby (disambiguation)
