= Gabriel (disambiguation) =

Gabriel is a messenger angel or an archangel in the Abrahamic religions.

Gabriel may also refer to:

== People ==
- Gabriel (given name), a given name
- Gabriel (surname)
- Saint Gabriel (disambiguation)
- Gabriel, pen name of the Scottish cartoonist Jimmy Friell
- Gabriel (judge royal), a nobleman in the Kingdom of Hungary
- Gabriel (footballer, born 1984), full name João Gabriel da Silva, Brazilian defender
- Gabriel (footballer, born 1988), full name Gabriel Rodrigues de Moura, Brazilian defender
- Gabriel (footballer, born July 1992), full name Gabriel Girotto Franco, Brazilian midfielder
- Gabriel (footballer, born September 1992), full name Gabriel Vasconcelos Ferreira, Brazilian goalkeeper
- Gabriel (footballer, born 1995), full name Gabriel Costa França, Brazilian defender
- Gabriel (footballer, born 1998), full name Gabriel José Ferreira Mesquita, Brazilian goalkeeper
- Gabriel Paulista (born 1990), Brazilian football defender
- Gabriel Barbosa (born 1996), Brazilian football forward, also known as Gabigol
- Gabriel Magalhães (born 1997) Brazilian football defender
- Gabriel Prosser, organizer of an anti-slavery revolt, 1800
- Gabriel Souza (born 1997), Brazilian football goalkeeper
- Gabriel Jesus (born 1997), Brazilian football forward
- Gabriel Martinelli (born 2001), Brazilian football forward
- Gabriel Bortoleto (born 2004), Brazilian Formula 1 driver

== Places ==
- Gabriel Lake, a source of the Opawica River in Québec, Canada
- Gabriel Island, Nunavut, Canada
- Mount Gabriel, Ireland
- San Gabriel, California, United States
- Stoke Gabriel, a village in Devon, England
- Plaza de Gabriel Lodares, a square in Albacete, Castile-La Mancha, Spain

== Art, entertainment and media ==
- .Gabriel, a 2010 opera by Robert J. Bradshaw
- Gabriel, an 1839 play by George Sand

== Film ==
- Gabriel (1976 film), a film by Canadian-American painter Agnes Martin
- Gabriel (2007 film), 2007 supernatural action film
- Gabriel (2014 film), 2014 thriller drama film

== Music ==
=== Artists ===
- Gabríel (rapper), Icelandic rapper

=== Albums ===
- Gabriel (Believer album), 2009
- Gabriel, 2022 by Keshi

=== Songs ===
- "Gabriel" (Joe Goddard song), 2011
- "Gabriel" (Najoua Belyzel song), 2005
- "Gabriel" (Roy Davis Jr. and Peven Everett song), 1997
- "Gabriel", a 2001 song by UK electronic music duo Lamb on the album What Sound

== Other uses ==
- Gabriel (New-Gen), a fictional character in American comic books by Marvel Comics
- Gabriel (missile), an Israeli anti-ship missile
- HMS Gabriel, various ships of the Royal Navy of the United Kingdom
- Gabriel (amplifiers), American manufacturer of audio equipment

== See also ==
- Gabriel's Horn, a paradox in geometry
- Gabriel's Rebellion
- Gabriela (disambiguation)
- Gabriele, a given name and a surname
- Gibril (disambiguation)
- Jibril (disambiguation)
