= Gabriel (surname) =

Gabriel is a surname of English, French, German, and Spanish origin from the angel and corresponding given name.

== Arts ==
- Ada Vorhaus Gabriel (1898–1975), American artist
- Albert Gabriel (1883–1972), French architect, archaeologist and art historian academic
- Alfons Gabriel (1894–1975), Austrian geographer and travel writer
- Ange-Jacques Gabriel (1698–1782), French architect
- Caroline Sylvia Gabriel (1912–1997), British artist
- Charles H. Gabriel (1856–1932), writer of gospel songs and composer of gospel music
- Ethel Gabriel (1921–2021), one of America's first female music record producers
- Edith Mabel Gabriel (1882–1972), British sculptor
- Gene Gabriel (born 1970), Cuban-American actor
- George Gabriel (born 1971), multi-instrumentalist, composer, and musician
- Gilbert Gabriel, African-English multi-instrumental musician and lyricist
- Gunter Gabriel (1942–2017), German singer and composer
- Jacques Gabriel (1667–1742), French architect
- Jacques Gabriel (painter) (1934–1988), Haitian painter
- John Gabriel (actor) (1931–2021), American actor
- Josh Gabriel, electronic dance music DJ and producer
- Juan Gabriel (1950–2016), Mexican singer and songwriter
- Louis Gabriel (1857–1927) (full name Charles Louis Gabriel), Australian photographer and medical practitioner
- Maddison Gabriel (born 1994), Australian model
- Marius Gabriel (born 1954), romance and mystery writer, artist and musician
- Marta Gabriel, Polish heavy metal musician
- Mike Gabriel (born 1954), American animator and film director
- Pascal Gabriel (born 1956), Belgian-born musician based in London
- Peter Gabriel (born 1950), English musician and singer
- Ralph Henry Gabriel (1890–1987), American historian and writer
- Ruth Gabriel (born 1975), Spanish actress
- Sargon Gabriel (born 1947), Assyrian musician
- Seychelle Gabriel (born 1991), American film and television actress and singer
- Thomas Gabriel (composer) (born 1957), German organist and composer

== Politics ==
- Brigitte Gabriel (born 1964), Lebanese American journalist, author, activist
- Charles A. Gabriel (1928–2003), Chief of Staff of the United States Air Force
- Hiram Gabriel (1825–1918), American politician
- James Gabriel (politician), Canadian Mohawk politician
- Mariya Gabriel, (born 1979), Bulgarian politician
- Mark A. Gabriel, writer on Islamic affairs
- Philip Gabriel, American professor and translator from Japanese
- Rony Gabriel (born 1994), Brazilian politician
- Sigmar Gabriel (born 1959), German politician and former chairman of the Social Democratic Party of Germany

== Sports ==
- Christian Gabriel (born 1975), German chess grandmaster
- Dillon Gabriel (born 2000), American football player
- Doug Gabriel (born 1980), American football player
- Jan C. Gabriel (1940–2010), American motorsport announcer
- Ján Gabriel (born 2010), Slovak professional footballer
- Jimmy Gabriel (1940–2021), Scottish football midfielder
- JJ Gabriel (born 1980), English football player
- John Gabriel (basketball), American executive in the National Basketball Association
- Justin Gabriel (born 1981), South African professional wrestler
- Kurtis Gabriel (born 1993), Canadian ice hockey player
- Petr Gabriel (born 1973), Czech footballer
- Roman Gabriel (1940–2024), American football player
- Shannon Gabriel (born 1988), Trinidadian cricketer
- Taylor Gabriel (born 1991), American football player
- Tony Gabriel (born 1948), Canadian football player
- Wenyen Gabriel (born 1997), South Sudanese-American basketball player for Maccabi Tel Aviv of the Israeli Basketball Premier League

== Others ==
- Eric Gabriel (1927–2015), British mechanical engineer
- James N. Gabriel (1923–1991), American lawyer and judge
- José Gabriel (1896–1957), Spanish-born Argentine writer and essayist
- R'Bonney Gabriel (born 1994), American fashion designer, model and beauty queen of Miss Universe 2022
- Richard P. Gabriel (born 1949), American computer programmer
- Siegmund Gabriel (1851–1924), German chemist
- Yohannan Gabriel (1758–1833), Chaldean bishop of Salmas from 1795 to 1833
- Willi Gabriel (1893–1968), German World War I flying ace

== See also ==
- Gabriel (given name)
- Gibril (disambiguation)
- Jibril (disambiguation)
