= Saint Gabriel =

Saint Gabriel may refer to:

== Saints ==
- Gabriel, archangel

=== Eastern Orthodox ===
- Gabriel the Iberian (died 10th century), Georgian Athonite monk
- Gabriel of Lesnovo (died 11th century), Bulgarian hermit
- Vsevolod-Gavriil of Pskov (fl. 12th century), Prince of Novgorod, of Pereyaslavl and of Pskov
- Gabriel II of Constantinople (died 1659), Ecumenical Patriarch of Constantinople for one week in 1659, Metropolitan of Prousa and new hieromartyr
- Gabriel of Belostok (1684–1690), Russian child martyr
- Gavriil Bănulescu-Bodoni (1746–1821), Archbishop of Chișinău (1812–1821)
- Gabriel Urgebadze (1929–1995), Georgian monk and fool for Christ

=== Oriental Orthodox ===
- Gabriel of Beth Qustan (574–668)

=== Roman Catholic ===
- Gabriel Lallemant (1610–1649), a Jesuit missionary and Canadian Martyr
- Gabriel-Taurin Dufresse (1750–1815), a French missionary and martyr saint of the Paris Foreign Missions Society
- Gabriel of Our Lady of Sorrows (1838–1862), a Passionist clerical student

== Places ==
In Canada

- Saint-Gabriel, Quebec
- Saint-Gabriel-Lalemant, Quebec
- Saint-Gabriel-de-Brandon, Quebec
- Saint-Gabriel-de-Rimouski, Quebec, known simply as Saint-Gabriel before 1998
- Saint-Gabriel-de-Valcartier

In France

- Saint-Gabriel-Brécy, a commune in the department of Calvados
- Saint-Gabriel (ancient Ernaginum), a hamlet within the commune of Tarascon, in southern France

In the United States

- St. Gabriel, Louisiana

In Turkey

- Mor Gabriel Monastery, the oldest surviving Syriac Orthodox monastery in the world near Midyat

== Institutions ==
- Auberge Le Saint-Gabriel, the oldest inn in North America, located in Montreal, Canada
- Saint Gabriel's School, a school in Santiago de Chile, Chile
- Saint Gabriel's Secondary School, an all-boys Catholic secondary school in Singapore
- Saint Gabriel International School, a Chinese educational institution in Pasig, Philippines
- St. Gabriel's Church, various institutions
- Saint Gabriel's College, various institutions

== See also ==
- Gabriel (disambiguation)
- San Gabriel (disambiguation) - Spanish spelling of Saint Gabriel
