= Joaquín Godoy Cruz =

Chilean politician (1837–1901)

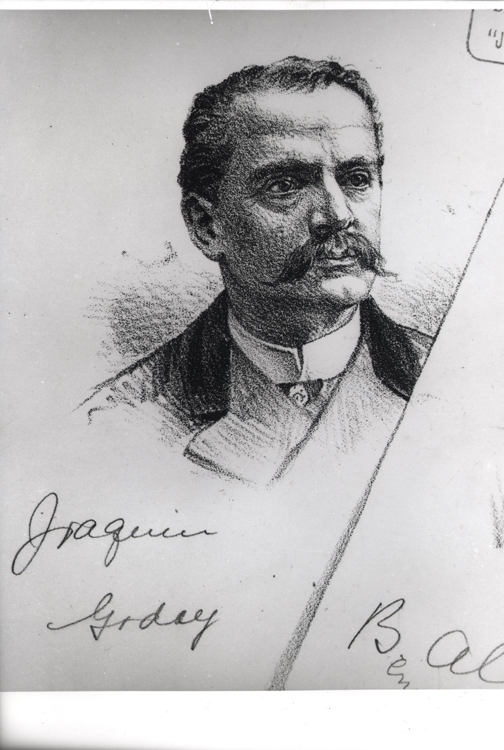

Minister of Foreign Affairs and Colonization
- In office 1886 – June 28, 1887
- Preceded by: Francisco Freire
- Succeeded by: Miguel Luis Amunátegui

Personal details
- Born: December 7, 1837 Santiago, Chile
- Died: August 27, 1901 Brazil

José Joaquín Godoy Cruz (Santiago, December 7, 1837 — Brazil, August 27, 1901) was a Chilean lawyer, diplomat, Minister of Foreign Affairs and the Interior during the government of José Manuel Balmaceda and senator. He served as auditor of the Chilean Navy, chargé d'affaires in Peru and signed the truce with Spain in Washington, D.C. in 1871. He played a key role in the formation and direction of the Information and Intelligence Service of the Chancellery before and during the War of the Pacific.

== Early life ==
He was the son of Pedro Godoy Palacios and María Cruz Vergara, and brother of the lawyer Domingo Godoy Cruz.

As minister plenipotentiary of Chile in Peru, he married Mariana Prevost y Moreira, belonging to a noble and important Peruvian family. Their son, Santiago Godoy Prevost, also became a lawyer and a public notary in Valparaíso.

== Career ==
In 1866 he was War Auditor of the Chilean Navy, a position he held until 1868. He was sent to the Chilean Legation in Lima at the end of 1868. In 1871 he was assigned as Minister Plenipotentiary of Chile in Washington, D.C. to agree on a truce pact between Spain and Chile, returning in 1872 as minister plenipotentiary in Lima, Peru. He held this position until 1879. He was transferred to Ecuador and Brazil with the same appointment while the War of the Pacific lasted. While he was a minister in Peru, in 1873 he learned unofficially three days after the signing of the existence of a Treaty of defensive alliance between Peru and Bolivia agreed upon by the government of Manuel Pardo and Agustín Morales respectively, this treaty in its first reaches considered Argentina. This information was sent to the Chilean government.

The government commissioned Godoy to obtain a confirmatory copy of said treaty, with this Godoy formed an information network creating a secret intelligence service, being its precursor, administrator and acting head. Confirmation of said treaty came from Carlos Walker Martínez, who served as minister plenipotentiary in Bolivia.

From 1873 to 1874, he had to face Peruvian intentions to intervene militarily alongside Argentina in favour of Bolivia, as expressed in a letter from the Minister of Foreign Affairs of Peru, José de la Riva-Agüero, to his representative in Bolivia, Aníbal Víctor de la Torre y Vidaurre.

After the arrival of the Chilean armored ships Cochrane and Blanco Encalada to Antofagasta, Peru, in naval inferiority, adopted a policy of diplomatic caution and in the Treaty of Friendship, Commerce and Navigation of 1877 between Chile and Peru, it agreed on the equivalence of commercial rights for citizens and companies from both countries, franchises for the trade of import and export products and resort to arbitration in case of differences. Additionally, rules were proposed to reduce the effects of a hypothetical war between both countries, regulating possible wars with third countries in the same way. The treaty was not ratified by the Chilean Congress.

Bolivia requested Peru to declare the casus foederis. Peru offered Chile and Bolivia to mediate in the matter. Both governments accepted the offer. When mediator José Antonio de Lavalle in Santiago and Peruvian President Ignacio Prado were questioned by the Chilean government about the existence of a secret alliance treaty between Peru and Bolivia, the Peruvian government publicly acknowledged the existence of the treaty for the first time. After the Bolivian attempt to impose the Ten Cents Tax, it was he who received from the president of Peru Mariano Ignacio Prado the official confirmation of the existence of the secret defensive alliance treaty, which was the pretext for Chile to declare the war against Peru on April 5, 1879. With the confirmation of the existence of such a secret agreement, the mediation by Lavalle in Chile ended.

=== War of the Pacific ===
Once the war was declared, Godoy was expelled from Peru and moved to Ecuador with the mission of achieving an alliance against Peru, which he could not obtain, but he managed to ensure that the government remained neutral despite the majority of the population being opposed to Chile. The abundant and detailed intelligence information obtained by an efficient network of informants and executives in Peru, Bolivia and Europe was vital for the Chilean military strategy in the war already unleashed. Thanks to his administration, it was possible to block the purchase of war material that Peru made in shipyards and weapons factories in Europe, supported by the management of Alberto Blest Gana, who was able to acquire, through astute triangulations, abundant modern war material for the Chilean Army during the conflict. In the Army, the secret service was nicknamed the "political office" and the link between the chancellery and the armed forces was Rear Admiral Patricio Lynch.

During the Lima campaign he accompanied the army as minister plenipotentiary and was present at the meeting that had to decide whether the attack on Chorrillos would be frontal or enveloping, as well as at the meeting with diplomatic representatives to agree on the Armistice of San Juan.

Godoy entered Lima with the Chilean Army on January 17 and was able to find in the Ministry of Foreign Affairs of Peru what Gonzalo Bulnes calls the "Godoy Papers", these are the communications between successive ministers and their respective representatives abroad and that have served to clarify the events that occurred during those years. After the occupation of Lima, the government appointed him plenipotentiary minister in Lima in mid-May 1881 where he attempted to negotiate with Francisco García Calderón, but he delayed the talks assuming that the United States would intervene in favour of Peru. On August 4, 1881, Godoy did not persist in negotiating and asked Patricio Lynch to disarm, in every sense of the word, the García Calderón government and he himself returned to Chile.

To counteract the interventionist maneuvers of the U.S. Secretary of State James G. Blaine and his representative in Lima, Stephen A. Hurlbut, he was sent by the government along with José Abelardo Núñez to North America to clarify through the press the reasons for the extension of the war. He traveled to replace Marcial Martínez Cuadros who was sent to England. After the death of James A. Garfield, his successor Chester Alan Arthur abandoned the policy that had supported the Peruvian rejection of the territorial cession.

Godoy was positively impressed by public opinion in the United States. In a report to President Santa María he wrote:

29 September 1882: Since I have known this country, it has been my firm belief that iniquitous, reckless, or simply imprudent international political plans will not prevail in it: that adventurous attempts may arise, and that there will be no shortage of those who support them with energy, with audacity, i even with a certain skill, but that they, whoever their assistants may be, and no matter how highly placed they are in social or political circles, will infallibly crash in the end after a more or less difficult and prolonged struggle, if you will, against the enlightened, upright public opinion, outstandingly endowed with good sense and the spirit of equity that prevails in this country.

In December 1882, during the Breña campaign, he met with Nicolás de Piérola in the U.S. and although in the meantime Piérola would have accepted the territorial transfer, he demanded that Chile pay the Peruvian debts. Piérola, after the interview, interrupted his return to Peru and returned to France.

In March 1883 he informed the government in Santiago that Secretary of State Frederick Theodore Frelinghuysen, in view of possible European intervention, had pressured him for Chile to end the war in any way. According to Bulnes, that was the reason invoked by some as to why the Treaty of Ancón that ended the war had so many inconsistencies resulting from the rush. Bulnes denies such an inference. After the war, the Chancellery secret service was dissolved and its members continued with their peacetime occupations.

=== Post-war ===
Some time later Godoy was Chile's ambassador to Ecuador and Brazil, and in 1886, he became Minister of Foreign Affairs and the Interior of President José Manuel Balmaceda. Later he was Chile's Minister Plenipotentiary in France and after the Revolution of 1891, he was left stateless for being a former Balmacedista. He settled in Argentina until 1895 and retired to Brazil.

He died in Brazil, and his remains were repatriated and buried in the General Cemetery of Santiago, on October 16, 1902.

== Legacy ==
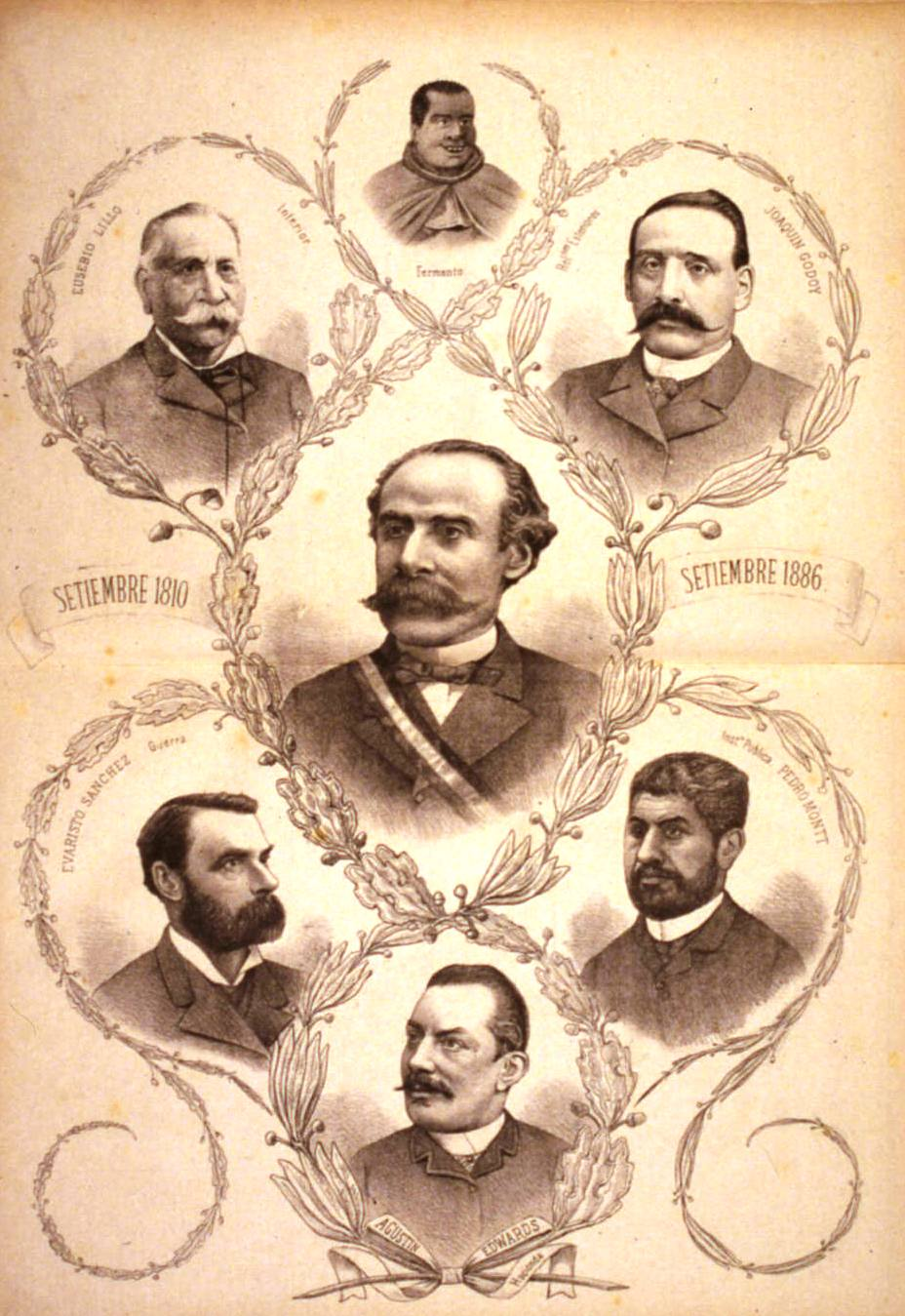
Godoy in Balmaceda's cabinet.

Chilean historian Guillermo Parvex indicates that Godoy was a cultured, social and very affable person. He maintained close friendships with Peruvian presidents José Balta, Manuel Pardo and Mariano Ignacio Prado, who received him without prior appointment in their offices by simply notifying their personal secretaries.

Fellow historian Mario Barros van Buren considers him one of the most talented members of the "Generation of 1865" that was promoted by Abdón Cifuentes since 1867 and that would represent Chile during the period of the War of the Pacific: Alberto Blest Gana, Francisco Astaburuaga Cienfuegos, Carlos Walker Martínez, Carlos Morla Vicuña, Marcial Martínez Cuadros, Maximiano Errázuriz Valdivieso, etc.

Despite his achievements, in family life, he was known for the mistreatment of his wife and his children, the latter receiving death threats from his own father for defending their mother. In her statements, she assured that "the treatment she was subjected to in the domestic home became a real burden, and the public, and even the press, became aware of it, since her husband could not easily hide the bad treatment that he inflicted". In March 1889, they appeared before the Chilean justice system to request a perpetual divorce, since his wife was unable to withstand the attacks that he publicly inflicted on her. This is how this public fact reached the ears of the Chilean President himself at the time, Domingo Santa María, through a letter from Cornelius Ambrose Logan, a U.S. diplomatic official, where he declared Mr. Godoy's private conduct in Washington, D.C. to be "incorrect, and how inconvenient and unhappy the condition of their domestic relations." The attacks committed by Godoy were known internationally. Despite this, he continued in relevant public positions, such as the position of Minister of Foreign Affairs of President José Manuel Balmaceda.

Currently, in the commune of La Reina, a street bears his name.
