= Juan Lira Bianchi =

Chilean politician

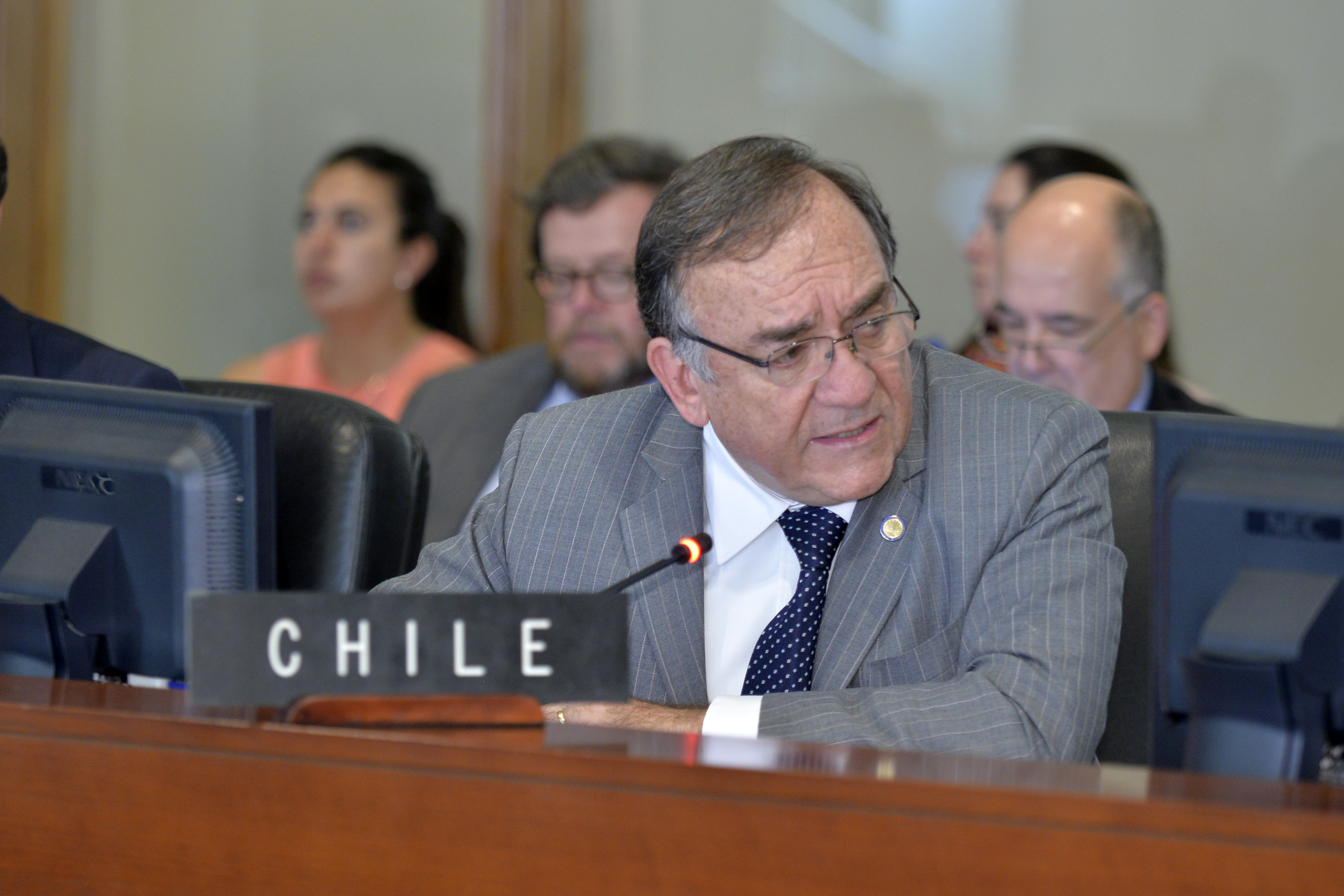

Executive Director of AGCID
- In office August 2016 – July 2020

Ambassador of Chile to Peru
- In office 2001–2006
- Preceded by: Carlos Martínez
- Succeeded by: Cristián Barros

Personal details
- Born: January 1, 1951 Santiago, Chile
- Awards: See relevant section

Juan Pablo Lira Bianchi (born 1951), is a retired Chilean diplomat. In his diplomatic career, he held positions as Chile's ambassador to Colombia (1994–1997), Peru (2001–2006), Ecuador (2010–2014) and permanent representative of Chile to the Organization of American States (2014-2016). He served as executive director of the Chilean Agency for International Development Cooperation (AGCID) from August 2016 to July 2020.

== Biography ==
He graduated from high school at the exclusive Colombian school Gimnasio Moderno, in Bogotá.

He was part of the Ministry of Foreign Affairs of Chile from August 1971 to January 1974. In September 1975, when he was living in Quito, Ecuador, he participated in the United Nations Children's Fund (UNICEF) in that city. until December 1977. Then he was a technical consultant to the Marginal Rural Development Fund (FODERUMA) at the Central Bank of Ecuador from September 1978 to October 1980.

In October 1981 he became deputy general manager of the companies “Inmobiliaria Mallorca S.A.” and “Pusuqui S.A.” in Quito, Ecuador, until December 1985, when he returned to Chile.

He was a researcher at the Center for Development Studies (CED) in Santiago, Chile from March 1986 to September 1991. In April 1990 he became executive secretary of the Foreign Policy Studies Circle (CEPEX), where he served until December 1991. That year Patricio Aylwin, President of Chile at the time, appointed him ambassador on March 1, 1992. Working in the Ministry of Foreign Affairs, he served as chief of staff to the undersecretary of foreign affairs from September 1991 to March 11, 1994. Later he was chief of staff to the minister of foreign affairs from March 11 to March 18. April 1994.

His next position was as ambassador extraordinary and plenipotentiary of Chile in Colombia, where he lived from May 25, 1995, to June 28, 1997. On July 1, 1997, he returned to Chile to assume the position of director of ceremonial and protocol, which he held until March 11, 2000. Then, on March 11, 2000, he assumed the position of chief of staff of the minister of foreign affairs until February 25, 2001. At the same time he was also a counselor of the International Cooperation Agency (AGCI) from March 11, 2000, to March 8, 2001.

He was later appointed ambassador extraordinary and plenipotentiary of Chile in Peru, where he arrived on March 10, 2001, and served in that position until May 14, 2006. He later took over as director of South America from May 22, 2006, to March 21, 2008. He then served as director general of foreign policy from March 24, 2008, to July 8, 2009.

On July 20, 2009, he assumed office as Extraordinary and Plenipotentiary Ambassador of Chile in Ecuador, where he lived until 2014. Then, in May 2014, he assumed the permanent delegation of Chile to the Organization of American States (OAS) in Washington, D.C., a position he held until July 2016. After his return to Chile once his mission to the OAS concluded, he retired from the foreign service and was appointed on an interim basis as director of the AGCID, a position that he later obtained through a public competition in mid-2016. He was officially appointed in 2017 by then-president Michelle Bachelet.

== Awards ==
- Grand Cross of the Order of Boyacá (1997)
- Grand Cross of the Order of Rio Branco (1997)
- Grand Cross of the National Order of Merit (1998)
- Order of the Aztec Eagle with sash (1998)
- Grand Officer of the Order of Merit of the Republic of Poland (1999)
- Grand Cross of the Order of Merit of the Federal Republic of Germany with star (1999)
- Grand Cross of the National Order of José Matías Delgado (1999)
- Grand Cross of the Order of Vasco Núñez de Balboa (1999)
- Grand Cross of the National Order of Honorato Vásquez (1999)
- Grand Officer of the Order of Merit of the Italian Republic (2000)
- Grand Cross of the Order of the Sun of Peru 2000
- Grand Cross of the Order of the Liberator General San Martín (2001)
- Grand Cross of the Order of San Carlos (2001)
- Grand Cross of the National Order of Merit (2001)
- Grand Cross of the Order of Merit for Distinguished Services (2006)
- Grand Cordon of the Order of Independence (Jordan) (2008)
- Shield of Police Merit (2014)
