= Andrés Barbé =

Chilean diplomat (b. 1954)

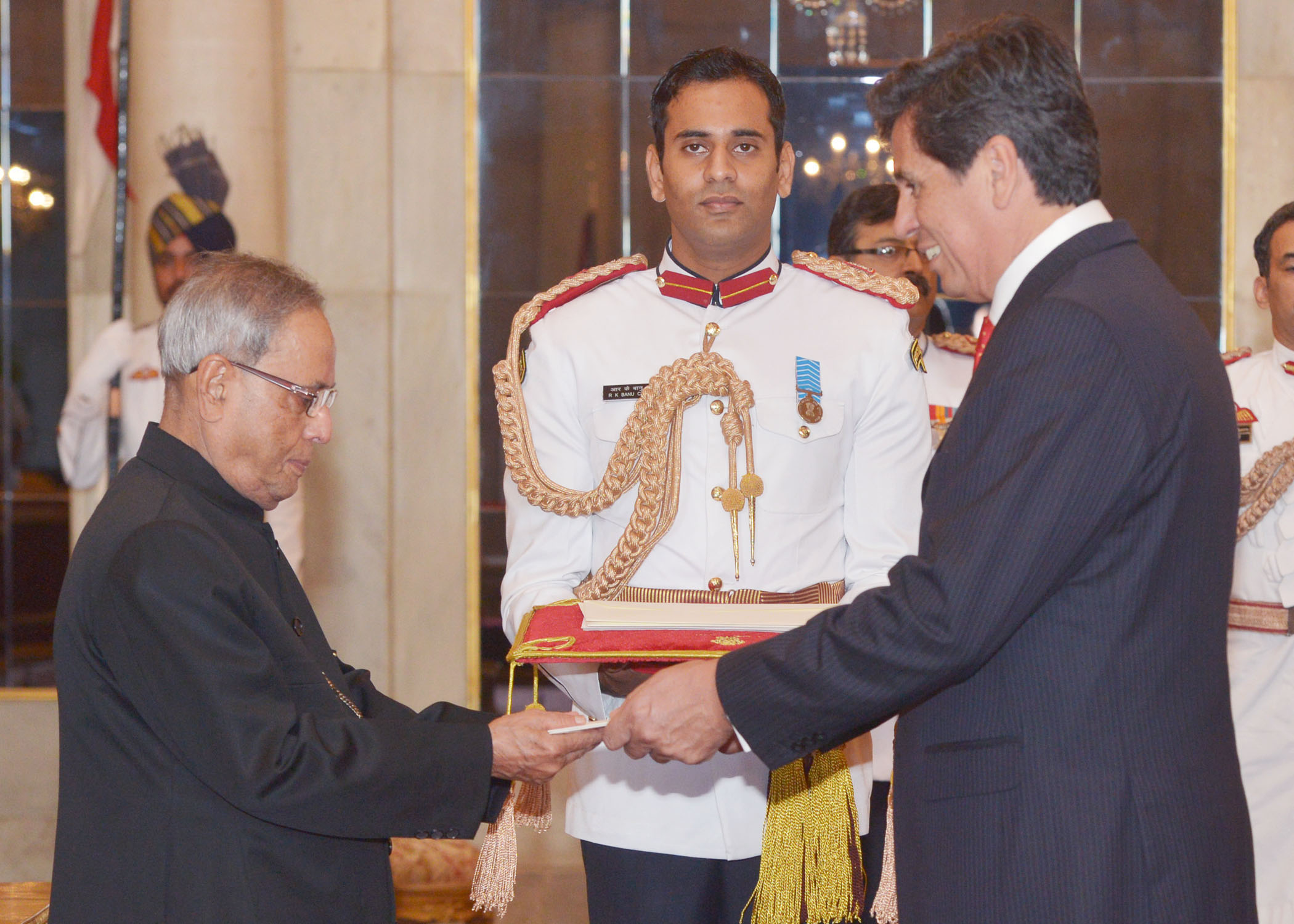

Ambassador of Chile to Peru
- In office June 20, 2020 – April 22, 2022
- Preceded by: Roberto Ibarra
- Succeeded by: Óscar Fuentes Lira

Ambassador of Chile to India
- In office 2014–2018
- Preceded by: Cristián Barros
- Succeeded by: Juan Angulo Monsalve

Personal details
- Born: Andrés Augusto Barbé González; 1954

Andrés Augusto Barbé González (born 1954) is a Chilean diplomat. He served as his country's ambassador to India from 2014 to 2018, and to Peru from 2020 to 2022.

== Career ==
Barbé graduated from the University of Chile with a degree in History and is a graduate of the Andrés Bello Diplomatic Academy. His studies were in Trade and Investment at Carleton University, Canada, and African History at the University of Nairobi.

Abroad, Barbé has been chargé d'Affaires in Kenya and has held positions in the Chilean Embassies in Argentina, Canada, Ecuador, Colombia and Peru.

In the Ministry of Foreign Affairs, he has been Director of Information Technology and Communications, deputy director of the Planning Directorate and Head of the Department of Studies in Personnel Management and Head of the Foreign Ministry at the Chilean Embassy in Argentina.
