= Bucătaru =

Bucătaru is a Romanian language occupational surname derived from word bucătar, or "cook". It may refer to:

- Gabriel Bucataru, Romanian-American founder of Gabriel guitar amplifier manufacturer
- Olga Bucătaru, Romanian actress
