= List of ambassadors of Chile to Peru =

Ambassador Extraordinary and Plenipotentiary of Chile to Peru
- Coat of Arms of Chile
- Incumbent; Óscar Fuentes Lira since July 21, 2022
- Inaugural holder: Joaquín Campino
- Formation: 1822

The Ambassador Extraordinary and Plenipotentiary of Chile in Peru is the official representative of the Government in Santiago de Chile to the Government of Peru. The ambassador operates the Chilean embassy located in the district of San Isidro, located in Lima.

Both countries established relations in 1822 and maintained them in an amicable manner until the War of the Pacific in 1879, which has left a feeling of Anti-Chilean sentiment in Peru since. This situation improved somewhat however after the signing of the 1929 Treaty of Lima, although a minor territorial dispute between both states remains to this day.

Relations between both countries were first severed during the aforementioned War of the Pacific, being reestablished in its immediate aftermath. During the Chilean–Peruvian territorial dispute over the Chilean-controlled territories of Tacna and Arica, Peru twice severed relations with Chile: first in 1901 until 1906 over the Chilenization policies carried out by Chile over the territories, and then in 1910 until 1928 after the expulsion of Peruvian priests from the city of Tacna.

== List of representatives ==
Accreditation	Ambassador	Observations	President	Term end
1822: Chile recognises the Peruvian government on October 8
October 8, 1822	Joaquín Campino	Minister Plenipotentiary	Bernardo O'Higgins	
A League, Alliance and Confederation treaty was signed between the two governments on December 22, 1822; Treaty complemented on April 26, 1823 with an aid treaty which regulated the financing of the liberation campaign.
1825	Manuel Rengifo	As chargé d'affaires.	Agustín Eyzaguirre	
1825	Joaquín Campino	As chargé d'affaires.	Agustín Eyzaguirre	
1827	Pedro Trujillo	As Minister Plenipotentiary.	Ramón Freire	
1828	Miguel Zañartu Santa María	As chargé d'affaires.	Ramón Freire	
1834	Ventura Lavalle González	Consul in Lima.	Fernando Errázuriz	1835
1835	Ventura Lavalle González	As chargé d'affaires.	Fernando Errázuriz	
November 17, 1837	Antonio José de Irisarri	Signatory of the Treaty of Paucarpata.	Fernando Errázuriz	November 17, 1837
1838	Mariano Egaña		Fernando Errázuriz	
1839	Miguel de la Barra	As chargé d'affaires.	Fernando Errázuriz	
1840	Manuel Camilo Vial	As chargé d'affaires.	Fernando Errázuriz	1840
1840	Ventura Lavalle González		Fernando Errázuriz	
1842	Pedro Delgado y Cotera	Consul in Lambayeque	Manuel Bulnes	
1844	Manuel Camilo Vial Formas	As chargé d'affaires.	Manuel Bulnes	
1845	Manuel José Cerda	As chargé d'affaires.	Manuel Bulnes	
1847	Diego José Benavente		Manuel Bulnes	
1849	Bernardo José de Toro	As chargé d'affaires.	Manuel Bulnes	
1852	Carlos Bello	As chargé d'affaires.	Manuel Montt	
1852	Victorino Garrido	As chargé d'affaires.	Manuel Montt	
1855	Ramón Luis Irarrázaval		Manuel Montt	
1860	Francisco Astaburuaga Cienfuegos	As chargé d'affaires.	Manuel Montt	
1861	Juan Herrera	As chargé d'affaires.	José Joaquín Pérez	
1863	José Victorino Lastarria		José Joaquín Pérez	
1864	Domingo Santa María		José Joaquín Pérez	
1864	José N. Hurtado de Mendoza	As chargé d'affaires.	José Joaquín Pérez	
1864	Manuel Montt Torres		José Joaquín Pérez	
1865	Marcial Martínez Cuadros	As chargé d'affaires.	José Joaquín Pérez	
1866	Marcial Martínez Cuadros		José Joaquín Pérez	
1868	Joaquín Godoy Cruz	As chargé d'affaires.	José Joaquín Pérez	
1870	Adolfo Ibáñez	As chargé d'affaires.	José Joaquín Pérez	
1870	Adolfo Ibáñez		José Joaquín Pérez	
1872	Joaquin Godoy Cruz		Federico Errázuriz	1879
Chile declares war on Peru and Bolivia on April 5, 1879, formally starting the War of the Pacific.
1881	Eulogio Altamirano		Domingo Santa María	1881
1881	José Francisco Vergara		Domingo Santa María	1881
1881	Jovino Novoa Vidal	As Minister Plenipotentiary during the occupation of Lima	Domingo Santa María	1886
Treaty of Ancón signed on October 20, 1883, formally ending the War of the Pacific.
1886	Benicio Álamos González		José M. Balmaceda	
1891	Ángel Custodio Vicuña		Jorge Montt	
1891	Javier Vial Solar		Jorge Montt	
1894	Máximo Ramón Lira		Jorge Montt	
1897	Vicente Santa Cruz Vargas		Federico Errázuriz	1898
1898	José Domingo Amunátegui Rivera		Federico Errázuriz	
1900	Ángel Custodio Vicuña		Federico Errázuriz	
1901	Beltrán Mathieu		Aníbal Zañartu	1901
1901	Víctor Vidaurre Leal Searle	As chargé d'affaires.	Aníbal Zañartu	
Relations severed by Peru from 1901 to 1905 due to the Chilenization of Tacna, Arica and Tarapacá.
1906	Luis Ortúzar	As chargé d'affaires.	Pedro Montt	
1906	Rafael Balmaceda Fernández		Pedro Montt	
1908	José Miguel Echenique	As Minister Plenipotentiary	Pedro Montt	1910
Relations severed by Peru in 1910 due to the expulsion of Peruvian priests from Tacna. Relations renewed at the formal request of July 9, 1928, by Frank B. Kellogg on July 11 (Chile) and 13 (Peru).
1928	Emiliano Figueroa	As ambassador.	Carlos Ibáñez	1929
1929	Conrado Ríos		Carlos Ibáñez	1930
1930	Ernesto Bertrand Vidal	As chargé d'affaires.	Carlos Ibáñez	
1930	Miguel Zañartu Santa María		Carlos Ibáñez	
1930	Manuel Rivas Vicuña		Pedro Opazo	
1934	Luis Subercaseaux		Carlos Dávila	
1939	Alfredo Duhal de Vásquez		Pedro Aguirre	
1940	Alberto Codou Ortiz		Pedro Aguirre Cerda	
1942	Luis Subercaseaux		Juan Antonio Ríos	
1945	José Francisco Urrejola		Juan Antonio Ríos	
1952	Enrique Gallardo Nieto		Carlos Ibáñez	
1953	Alfonso Bulnes Calvo		Carlos Ibáñez	
1953	Eduardo Cruz-Coke		Jorge Alessandri	
1960	Jorge Errázuriz Echenique		Jorge Alessandri	
1965	Horacio Walker		Eduardo Frei Montalva	
1968	Sergio Larraín		Eduardo Frei Montalva	1971
1971	Luis Jerez Ramírez		Salvador Allende	
1973	Eduardo Bravo Woodhouse	As chargé d'affaires.	Augusto Pinochet	
1973	Gastón Illanes Fernández		Augusto Pinochet	
1973	Máximo Errázuriz Ward	Named on November 16, 1973; accredited on January 9, 1974	Augusto Pinochet	
1976	Demetrio Infante Figueroa		Augusto Pinochet	
1976	Francisco Bulnes Sanfuentes		Augusto Pinochet	1979
1981	José Miguel Barros		Augusto Pinochet	1983
1983	Juan José Fernández Valdés		Augusto Pinochet	
1990	Alejandro Magnet		Patricio Aylwin	
1994	Carlos Martínez Sotomayor		Eduardo Frei Ruiz-Tagle	1997
2001	Juan Lira Bianchi		Ricardo Lagos	2006
March 11, 2006	Cristián Barros		Michelle Bachelet	2008
2008	Fabio Vio		Michelle Bachelet	2014
2014	Roberto Ibarra		Michelle Bachelet	2020
February 11, 2020	Andrés Barbé González		Sebastián Piñera	April 22, 2022
July 21, 2022	Óscar Fuentes Lira	Fuentes presented his credentials on July 21, 2022.	Gabriel Boric	March 11, 2026

== See also ==
- List of ambassadors of Peru to Chile
