= Havrilla =

Havrilla is a Rusyn surname. It is a derivate of the personal name Havrylo, Rusyn equivalent of Gabriel. Notable people with the surname include:

- Dennis Havrilla (born 1987), American football player
- Jo Ann Havrilla, American actress
