= Jovino Novoa Vidal =

Chilean politician (1822–1892)

Jovino Novoa
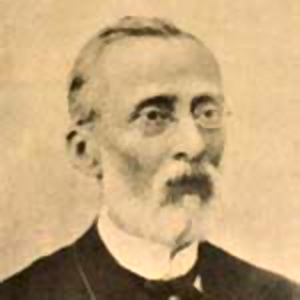

Minister Plenipotentiary of Chile to Peru
- In office 1881–1886
- Preceded by: José Francisco Vergara
- Succeeded by: Benicio Álamos González

Minister Plenipotentiary of Chile to Spain
- In office 1882–1884
- Preceded by: Relations reestablished
- Succeeded by: Patricio Lynch

Minister of Finance
- In office October 3, 1859 – October 1, 1861
- Preceded by: Matías Ovalle
- Succeeded by: Manuel Rengifo

Personal details
- Born: 1822 Concepción, Chile
- Died: February 14, 1892 Santiago, Chile
- Party: Liberal Party
- Education: University of Chile

Jovino Novoa Vidal (Concepción, 1822 — Santiago, February 14, 1892) was a Chilean lawyer, diplomat and liberal politician. He served several times as a parliamentarian, in addition to having been mayor of the province of Valparaíso from 1858 to 1860 and, then Minister of Finance between 1859 and 1861, both during the administration of President Manuel Montt. During the War of the Pacific (1879), he served as minister plenipotentiary in Lima, for which he signed the Treaty of Ancón, remaining in office until 1886. Simultaneously he functioned as ambassador of Chile to the Kingdom of Spain, signing the 1883 Chilean–Spanish Treaty, which put an end to the state of war between both nations in force since the Spanish–South American War (1864-1866).

== Early life ==
Novoa was born in 1822 in Concepción, the son of Manuel Fernando Vásquez de Novoa López and Carmen Vidal Gómez. He married Mercedes Risopatrón and in his second marriage he became engaged to his cousin Carolina Novoa Arteaga, having children.

His secondary studies were completed at the National Institute; and he continued with his law degree at the University of Chile, being sworn in as a lawyer on March 8, 1845.

== Professional career ==
In 1850 he began his judicial career as a Judge of Letters of San Fernando, appointed during the last years of the administration of President Manuel Bulnes, being later promoted as Judge of Crime of Valparaíso in 1854 and mayor of the province of the same name, in 1858.

In 1859 he was appointed Minister of Finance, a position he served from October 3 of that year until October 1, 1861, during the end of the government of Manuel Montt. In this position he signed the national loan to finish the railway from Valparaíso to Santiago that was inaugurated in 1859.

In 1868 he defended the Supreme Court against the accusation made in the Senate of the Republic and obtained its acquittal. In 1878 he was appointed member of the Faculty of Law of the University of Chile, on May 7 of that year. At his incorporation he spoke about the "Judiciary, its independence and its responsibility."

After the occupation of Lima, he was appointed minister plenipotentiary in Peru, and as legal advisor to Admiral Patricio Lynch and as depositary of the sovereignty of Chile, whom he represented in the preliminary negotiations and in the signing of the Treaty of Ancón, signed in Lima on October 20, 1883. In this period, he was also commissioned to send newspapers published in Lima, to Santiago de Chile, during the occupation from 1881 to 1885.

Upon returning to the country, he was appointed member of the Arbitration Courts in charge of ruling on foreign claims that gave rise to the War of the Pacific.

== Political career ==
He was elected deputy owner for Valparaíso, for the period 1861–1864. He opted for Valparaíso, having also been elected for Coelemu. He served as a replacement deputy in the Permanent Commission of Finance and Industry. In the following elections, he was re-elected deputy owner, but for Parral, for the period 1864–1867. He did not join until June 28, 1864. He joined the Permanent Commission of Finance and Industry.

Three years later, he was elected deputy owner for Linares, for the period 1870–1873; The elections of April 3, 1870 were declared null and void by the Chamber and ordered to be repeated. While the court considered this situation, he presumptively functioned as deputy owner, among others. He did not take the oath. According to Los constituyentes de 1870, by Justo and Domingo Arteaga Alemparte, he participated in the Constituent Congress of 1870, whose objective was reforms to the Fundamental Charter of 1833.

He returned to the Lower house in 1876, when he was elected deputy owner for Santiago, for the period 1876–1879. He was a member of the Permanent Commission of Finance and Industry.

Once again elected deputy owner, but for Casablanca, for the period 1879–1882. On that occasion, he continued to be a member of the Permanent Commission of Finance and Industry; and he was a member of the Conservative Committee for the recess 1879–1880; 1880–1881; and 1881–1882.

During the government of Domingo Santa María, he also served as Chile's minister plenipotentiary in Spain, when the Peace Treaty with Spain was signed in Lima, where he represented Chile and Enrique Vallés represented Spain. The previous treaty, signed in Madrid in 1844, had expired due to the Chincha Islands War of 1865.

At that same time, he was elected as senator for Colchagua, in the period 1882–1888. He was disqualified from serving as such, because he accepted a public appointment and was included in the case of the final part of Article 32 of the Constitution. After finishing his position to which he was appointed, he appeared for the parliamentary elections of 1885, being elected deputy owner for Talca, for the period 1885–1888. He was a replacement deputy in the Permanent Commission of Constitution, Legislation and Justice; and member of the Conservative Commission for the 1887-1888 recess.

In the parliamentary elections of 1888, he was reelected senator-proprietary, but this time again for Colchagua, for the period 1888–1894. In this period, he was a member of the Permanent Commission of Finance and Industry, of which he was president; and he was a member of the Conservative Committee for the recess 1888–1889; 1889–1890; and 1890–1891.

He died in Santiago, on February 14, 1892, without being able to finish his senatorial period.

Political offices
Preceded by -	Senator for Colchagua; June 1, 1888–February 14, 1892; June 1, 1882–1884	Succeeded by -
Preceded by -	Deputy for Talca Department; June 1, 1885–June 1, 1888	Succeeded by -
Preceded by Relations reestablished	Minister Plenipotentiary to Spain; 1882–1884	Succeeded by Patricio Lynch
Preceded by José Elías Balmaceda	Deputy for Casablanca; June 1, 1879–June 1, 1882	Succeeded by Basilio Soffia Otaegui
Preceded by -	Deputy for Santiago; June 1, 1876–June 1, 1879	Succeeded by -
Preceded by -	Deputy for Linares Department; June 1, 1870–June 1, 1873	Succeeded by -
Preceded by -	Deputy for Parral Department; June 28, 1864–June 1, 1867	Succeeded by -
Preceded by -	Deputy for Valparaíso Department; June 1, 1861–June 1, 1864	Succeeded by -
Preceded by Matías Ovalle Errázuriz	Minister of Finance; October 3, 1859–October 1, 1861	Succeeded by Manuel Rengifo Vial
Preceded by Manuel Valenzuela Castillo	Commander-in-chief of the Navy; 1859	Succeeded by Juan Vidaurre-Leal Morla
