= Djibo (name) =

- Gender: Masculine

Other names
- Related names: Gabe, Gabriel, Djibril

Djibo is a common masculine name in Muslim countries, and is a diminutive form of Djibril (alternatively Djibrilla, Jibrīl, Jibrīlla, Jibril, Jibreel or Jabrilæ, the Arabic name for Gabriel. In English the equivalent name is Gabe.

== Notable people named Djibo ==
- Djibo Bakary was a socialist politician and important figure in the independence movement of Niger.
- Djibo Leyti Kâ is a Senegalese politician and the Secretary-General of the Union for Democratic Renewal (URD).

== As a surname ==
- Martine Djibo, Ivorian educator and politician
