= Friell =

Friell is a surname. Notable people with the surname include:

- Jimmy Friell (1912–1997), Scottish cartoonist
- Vincent Friell (1960–2024), Scottish actor
