= Djibo (disambiguation) =

Djibo is a town in northern Burkina Faso, and the capital of the Djibo department.

Djibo may also refer to:

- Djibo (name), a given name (and list of people with that name)
- Djibo Department, a department of Soum Province, Burkina Faso
- Djibo Airport, an airport serving the town of Djibo
