= Fuente de las Ranas (Albacete) =

Fountain in Spain

Coordinates: 38°59′49″N 1°51′08″W

The Fuente de las Ranas (English: Fountain of the Frogs) is an emblematic fountain located in center of the Spanish city of Albacete. Built in memory of Dionisio Guardiola, was inaugurated in 1916 in the center of the current Plaza de Gabriel Lodares, having chaired several places in the city until, in 2007, it was moved to its current location, the roundabout between the Paseo de la Libertad, the Avenida de la Estación, the Paseo de la Cuba and Calle Alcalde Conangla.

== History ==
The Fuente de las Ranas was built in memory of Dionisio Guardiola after being proposed in 1913 by the Society of Water of Albacete to the City Hall of Albacete as a tribute to the important contribution had made this Republican lawyer in the construction of water supply system of the city. The fountain was placed in the Plaza de Gabriel Lodares, then called Plaza de Canalejas, in 1916.

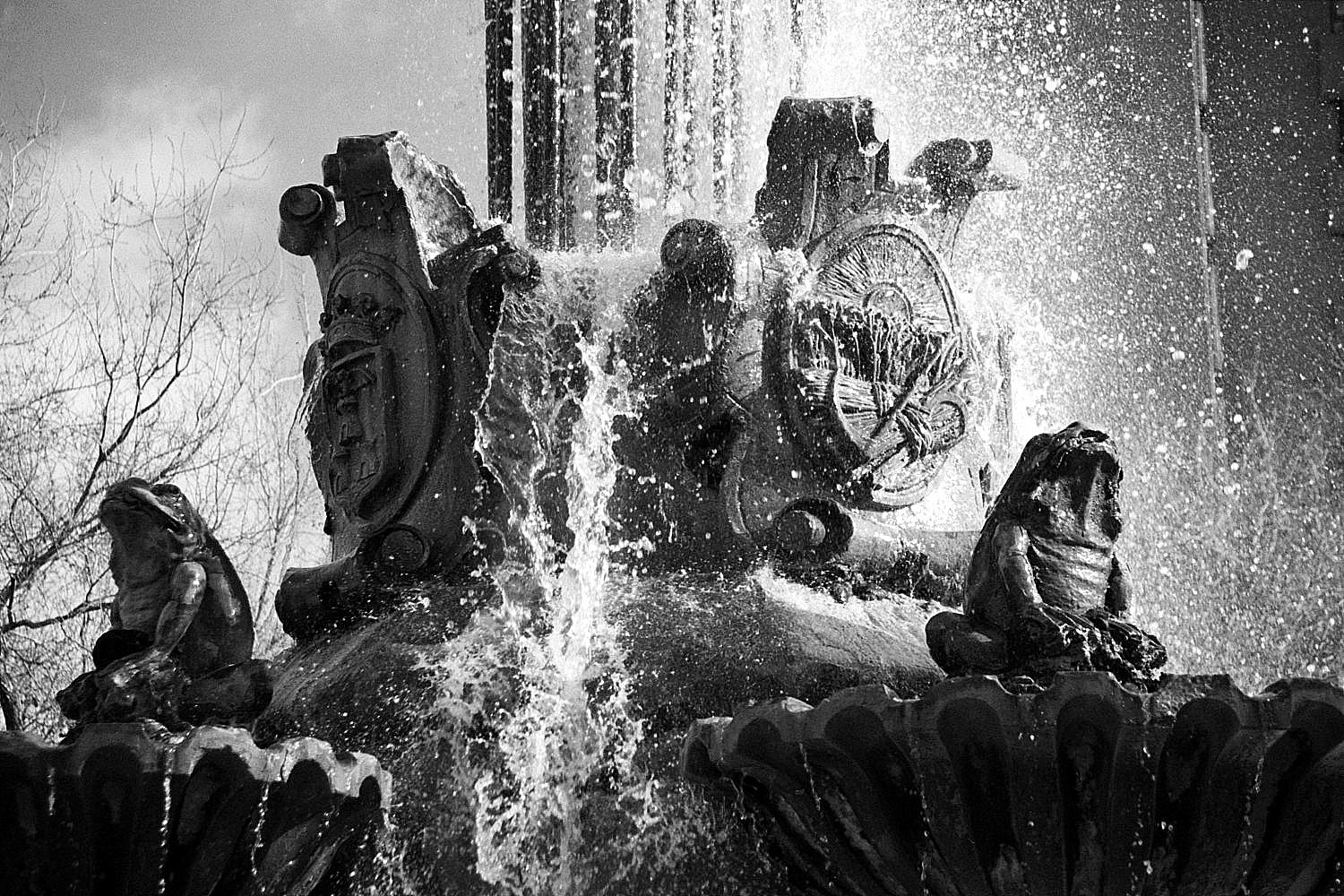
Detail of the frogs, shells and scrolls from the Fuente de las Ranas

In 1935, it was transferred to the Parque Abelardo Sanchez that, at the time, was called Parque de Canalejas. In 1950 was retired and stored at the Matadero Municipal. In 1980 was recovered in the Parque Lineal until, in 2007, after the construction of underground parking El Sembrador, was located on the roundabout between the Paseo de la Libertad, the Avenida de la Estación, the Paseo de la Cuba and Calle Alcalde Conangla.

== Features ==
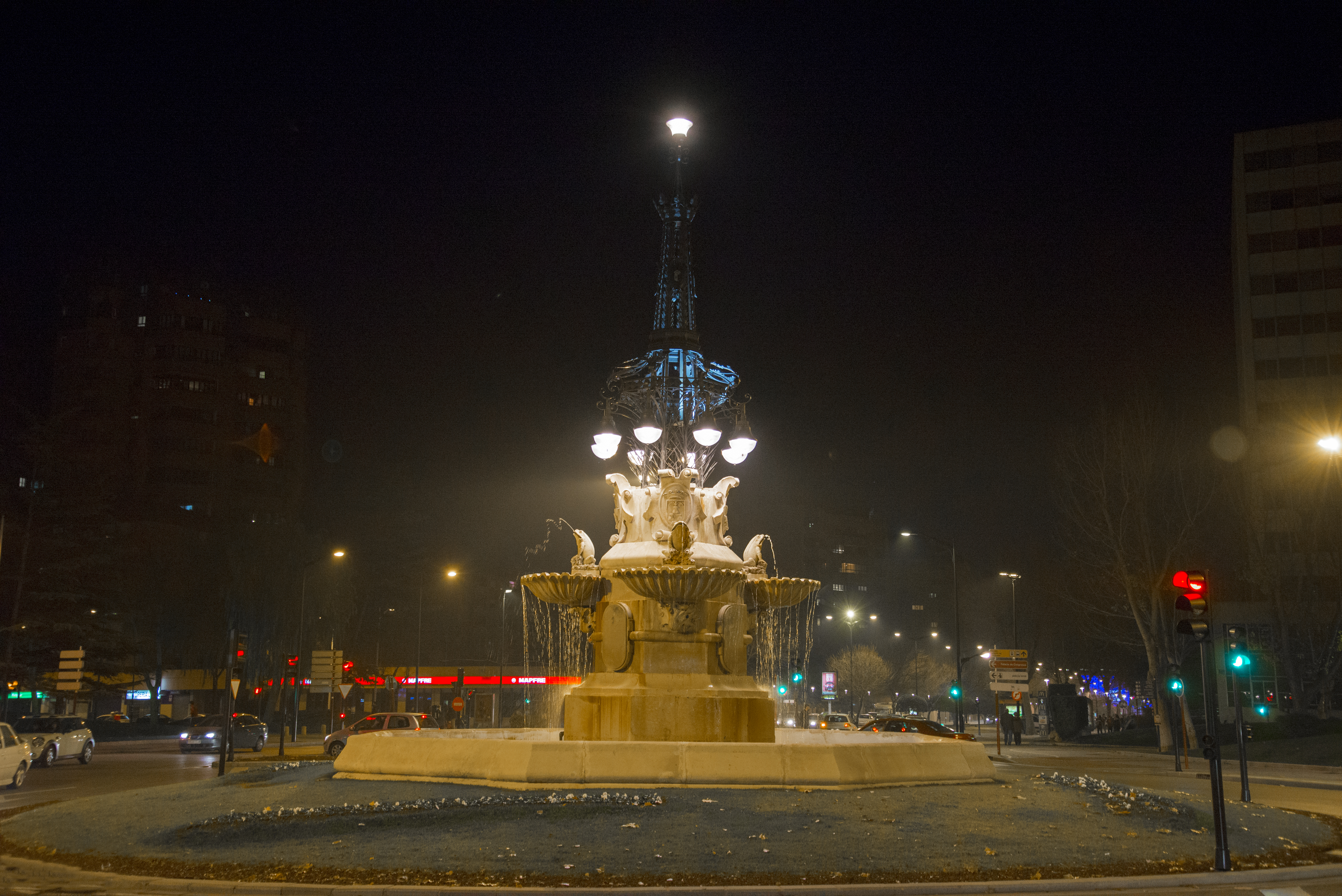
Night view of the Fuente de las Ranas

The fountain was named by the four frogs that adorn it. The mechanism of water of the fountain is as follows: the frogs expel the water through the mouth into the shells located under the same finally falling into an octagonal pond that forms the basis of the fountain.

It has four scrolls located over the frogs representing the agriculture, the commerce and the industry, the Coat of Arms of Albacete and a dedication of the Society of Drinking Waters of Albacete to Dionisio Guardiola. wrought iron lights consists of nine luminaries and nine pendants and the coat of arms of Albacete, Castilla-La Mancha and Spain.
