= Gabe =

Gabe is a given name and a short form of the given name Gabriel; it is also a surname. Notable people and characters with the name include:

== Given name ==
- Gabe Alvarez (born 1974), Mexican baseball player and coach
- Gabe Brown (born 2000), American basketball player
- Gabe Carimi (born 1988), American football player
- Gabe Cramer (born 1994), American baseball pitcher
- Gabe Davis (born 1999), American football player
- Gabe Gauthier (born 1984), American hockey player and coach
- Gabe Gleeson, Australian record producer and musician performing as Indian Summer
- Gabe Gonzalez (born 1972), American baseball player
- Gabe Gross (born 1979), American baseball player and coach
- Gabe Hall, American college football player
- Gabe Holmes (born 1991), American football player
- Gabe Ikard (born 1990), American football player
- Gabe Jacas (born 2004), American football player
- Gabe Jackson (born 1991), American football player
- Gabe Jeudy-Lally (born 2001), American football player
- Gabe Kaplan (born 1945), American actor and comedian
- Gabe Kapler (born 1975), American baseball player and manager
- Gabe Klobosits (born 1995), American baseball player
- Gabe Lazo (born 1984), American basketball coach
- Gabe Levin (born 1994), American-Israeli basketball player
- Gabe Lopez (1994 or 1995–2026), American singer-songwriter and producer
- Gabe Madsen (born 2001), American basketball player
- Gabe Martin (born 1992), American football player
- Gabe Molina (born 1975), American baseball player
- Gabe Nabers (born 1997), American football player
- Gabe Newell (born 1962), American businessman, managing director of Valve
- Gabe Northern (born 1974), American football player and coach
- Gabe Paul (1910–1988), American baseball executive
- Gabe Patterson (1919–1991), American athlete
- Gabe Pruitt (born 1986), American basketball player
- Gabe Ruth, pseudonym of Australian record producer and musician Gabe Gleeson
- Gabe Saporta, Uruguayan-American musician
- Gabe Speier (born 1995), American baseball pitcher
- Gabe Vincent (born 1996), Nigerian-American basketball player
- Gabe Watson (born 1983), American football player
- Gabe White (born 1971), American baseball player
- Gabe Wilkins (born 1971), American football player
- Gabe Wright (born 1992), American football player
- Gabe York (born 1993), American basketball player

== Surname ==
- Dora Gabe, Bulgarian poet
- Rhys Gabe (1880–1967), Welsh rugby union player

== Fictional characters ==
- Gabe, a character in the book Locked in Time
- Gabe, a character in the movie Romper Stomper
- Gabe, a character in the video game Cliffhanger
- Gabe, a character in the film Get a Clue
- Gabe, a character in the film Thinner
- Gabe, a character in the TV series Gotham
- Gabe, a robot in the comic strip The 86ers
- Gabe, an angel in the webtoon Adventures of God
- Gabe, aka Johnathan Gabriel, in the comic strip Penny Arcade
- Gabe Duncan, a character in the television show Good Luck Charlie
- Gabe Jones, a Marvel Comics character first appearing in Sgt. Fury and his Howling Commandos
- Gabe Lewis, a Regional Director of Sales in The Office (U.S. TV series)
- Gabe Logan, a protagonist in the Syphon Filter video game series

== See also ==
- Gabe's
- Gabès
- Gabriel (disambiguation)
