= Jubril =

Jubril is the name of:

- Jubril Aminu, Nigerian cardiologist
- Jubril Martins-Kuye, Nigerian politician
- Jubril Okedina, English footballer

== See also ==
- Jibril (disambiguation)
