= José Nicolás Hurtado de Mendoza y Jaraquemada =

Chilean politician (1836–1908)

José Nicolás Hurtado de Mendoza
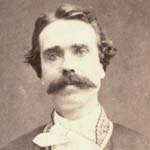
- Born: 1836; Melipilla, Chile
- Died: September 8, 1908
- Education: University of Chile

José Nicolás Hurtado de Mendoza y Jaraquemada (Melipilla, 1836 — September 8, 1908) was a Chilean lawyer, diplomat and politician who held the position of chargé d'affaires in Peru, at the beginning of the crisis that led to the Spanish–South American War (1864–1866). During the occupation of the Chincha Islands he presented a settlement proposal that was rejected by Peru and is named in the Vivanco–Pareja Treaty.

== Early life ==
He was the son of Nicolás Hurtado de Mendoza y Martínez de la Torre and María Mercedes Jaraquemada y Avaria, brother of the deputy Manuel Antonio Hurtado de Mendoza y Jaraquemada.

He completed his studies at the National Institute. He studied law at the University of Chile, where he qualified as a lawyer on July 15, 1857. He married Teresa Eyzaguirre de la Cavareda on June 4, 1863.

== Career ==
He joined as a senior officer of the Ministry of Foreign Affairs. In 1864, he was chargé d'affaires in Peru. The following year he was envoy extraordinary and minister plenipotentiary in Ecuador. In 1870, he became a member of the Faculty of Legal and Social Sciences of the University of Chile.

Hurtado de Mendoza held other ranks throughout his lifetime, such as:

- Mayor of Tarapacá (October 18, 1881 – June 1882)
- Member of the Public Instruction Corps (1887)
- Substitute deputy for Valparaíso (1861–1864). He joined on June 18, 1861, after the deputy owner Manuel Andrés Orrego left his post.
- Substitute deputy for Linares, (1864–1867). He replaced the deputy owner, Cornelio Saavedra Rodríguez, who did not join until August 30, 1864.
- Deputy owner for Illapel (1876–1879; 1879–1882).
- Deputy owner for Santiago (1882–1885)

He was a member of the Permanent Commission of Government and Foreign Relations; and member of the Conservative Commission for the recess of 1882–1883.
