= San Gabriel =

San Gabriel, Spanish for Saint Gabriel, may refer to:

== North America ==
Mexico

- San Gabriel, Durango
- San Gabriel, Guanajuato
- San Gabriel, Jalisco
- San Gabriel Chilac, Puebla
- San Gabriel Mixtepec, Oaxaca

United States

- San Gabriel, California
  - Mission San Gabriel Arcángel in San Gabriel, California
- The San Gabriel River (California), site of the 1847 Battle of Rio San Gabriel in the Mexican–American War
- The San Gabriel River (Texas), site of the 1839 Battle of the San Gabriels in the Texas-Indian Wars
- The San Gabriel Valley in California
- The San Gabriel Mountains in California
- San Gabriel, Texas

== South & Central America ==
Ecuador

- San Gabriel, Ecuador

Guatemala

- San Gabriel, Suchitepéquez

== Other ==
Philippines

- San Gabriel, La Union

== See also ==
- Saint Gabriel (disambiguation)
