= Cristián Barros =

Chilean diplomat (born 1952)

Cristián Barros Melet
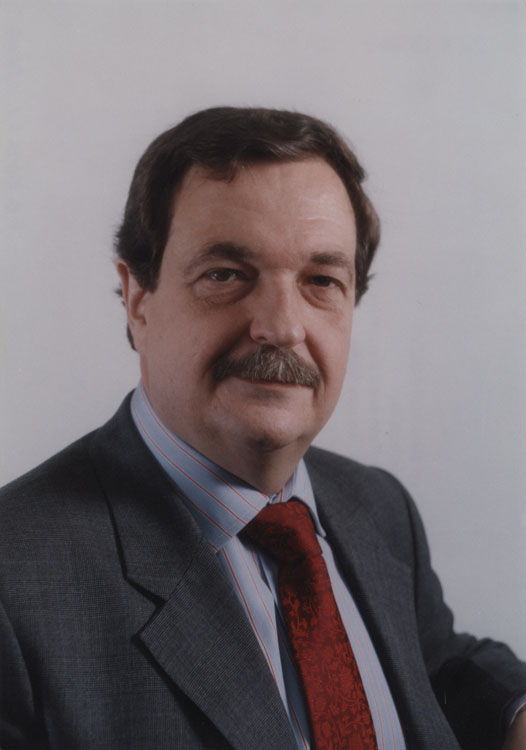

Permanent Representative of Chile to the United Nations
- In office 2014–2018
- Appointed by: Michelle Bachelet
- Preceded by: Octavio Errázuriz Guilisasti
- Succeeded by: Milenko Skoknic Tapia

Ambassador of Chile to India
- In office 2010–2014
- Appointed by: Sebastián Piñera
- Succeeded by: Andrés Barbé

Ambassador of Chile to Italy
- In office 2008–2010
- Appointed by: Michelle Bachelet
- Preceded by: Gabriel Valdés
- Succeeded by: Oscar Godoy

Ambassador of Chile to Peru
- In office 2006–2008
- Appointed by: Michelle Bachelet
- Succeeded by: Fabio Vio

Personal details
- Born: October 9, 1952 (age 73) Santiago, Chile
- Education: Universidad de Chile; Andrés Bello Diplomatic Academy
- Occupation: Diplomat, politician

Cristián Barros Melet (born 9 October 1952) is a Chilean diplomat who was the Permanent Representative of Chile to the United Nations in New York since 16 April 2014 to 2018. He also served as Ambassador to India (2010–14), Italy (2008–10), Peru (2006–08), United Kingdom (2000–02) and Denmark (1993–96). He also served as Undersecretary for Foreign Affairs (2002–06) in the government of Ricardo Lagos.

== Biography ==
Born in Santiago de Chile, Barros was educated at Saint Gabriel's School. After graduating from Law at the University of Chile in Santiago, Barros also attended the Andrés Bello Diplomatic Academy in 1973. In 1974, he entered the Foreign Service Consular Directorate. From 1978 he served in the Administration Office of the Ministry of Foreign Affairs until 1979. In 1979, he took his first diplomatic posting as Deputy Consul in Mendoza, Argentina. In 1980, he was posted as consul in Bariloche, Argentina. Between 1983 and 1985 he worked in the American Division of the Department of Bilateral Policy. In 1985 he was appointed Chile's Consul-General in Chicago, United States until 1988. From 1989 to 1990 he was First Secretary in the Embassy of Chile in Canada, when he became Chief of Staff to the Director General of Foreign Policy.

In 1991 he was appointed as Director of Personnel and between 1992 and 1993 served as Chief Administrative Officer of the Ministry. In 1993, he was appointed as Ambassador to Denmark, serving until 1996. From 1996 to 1998 he was Administrative Director of the Ministry and from 1998 to 1999 took over as Director General of Foreign Policy. From 2000 to 2002 he was Ambassador to the United Kingdom, with accreditation to Ireland. In 2002, he was appointed by President Ricardo Lagos as Undersecretary for Foreign Affairs, serving until 2006. From 2006 to 2008 he served as Ambassador to Peru and from 2008 to 2010 was ambassador to Italy, with accreditation to Malta. While in Italy he also sat as Chile's Permanent Representative to the Food and Agriculture Organization. In 2010 he was appointed Ambassador to India, with accreditation to Sri Lanka, Bangladesh and Nepal. In 2014, Barros was appointed to succeed Octavio Errázuriz as Permanent Representative of Chile to the United Nations and presented his credentials to Secretary-General Ban Ki-moon on 16 April 2014. Barros was President of the United Nations Security Council in January 2015.

== Honours ==
- 1993: Grand Cross of the Order of Merit of Portugal.
- 1996: Grand Cross of the Order of the Dannebrog (Denmark).
- 1998: Grand Cross of the Order of May (Argentina).
- 1999: Grand Cross of the National Order of Merit (Brazil).
- 1999: Grand Cross of the Order of the Sun of Peru.
- 2003: Knight Grand Cross of the Order of Orange-Nassau (Netherlands).
- 2004: Knight Grand Cross of the Order of Isabella the Catholic (Spain).
- 2004: Grand Cross of the Order of the Liberator General San Martin (Argentina).
- 2004: Grand Officer of the Order of Ouissam Alaouite (Morocco).
- 2005: Member (1st Class) of the Order of Service Merit (Korea)
- 2006: Grand Cross of the Order of Vasco Núñez de Balboa (Panama).

Diplomatic posts
Preceded by Juan Lira Bianchi	Ambassador of Chile to Peru; 2006 – 2008	Succeeded by Fabio Vio Ugarte
Preceded by Octavio Errázuriz	Permanent Representative of Chile to the United Nations; 2014 – 2018	Succeeded by Milenko Skoknic
