= Jibril (disambiguation) =

Jibril (Arabic: جِبْرِيل) is an Arabic variant of Gabriel, and a common Arabic given name and surname.

Jibril may refer to:

== Given name ==
- Jibril Aminu (1939–2025), Nigerian cardiologist and politician
- Jibril Rajoub (born 1953), also known by his kunya Abu Rami, Palestinian political and militant figure
- Jibril Yakubu, Administrator of Zamfara State after it was created from part of Sokoto State in October 1996
- Jibril, a character from the No Game No Life series

== Middle name ==
- Abdul Rahman Ahmed Jibril Baroud (1937–2010), Palestinian poet
- Cameron Jibril Thomaz (born 1987), better known by the stage name Wiz Khalifa, American rapper

== Surname ==
- Ahmed Jibril (1938–2021), founder and leader of the Popular Front for the Liberation of Palestine – General Command
- Jihad Ahmed Jibril (1961–2002), leader of the military wing of the Popular Front for the Liberation of Palestine – General Command
- Mahmoud Jibril (1952–2020), Prime Minister of Libya for seven and a half months during the Libyan Civil War
- Mas’ud El-Jibril, Nigerian Senator and politician
- Mohammed Kabiru Jibril (1958–2017), Nigerian senator and politician

== Other uses ==
- Jibril (film), a 2018 film

== See also ==
- Jubril (disambiguation)
- Gabriel (disambiguation)
- Gibril (disambiguation)
- Djibril (disambiguation)
- Jibril Agreement (May 21, 1985), a prisoner exchange between the Israeli government and the Popular Front for the Liberation of Palestine - General Command
