= Treaty of Friendship, Commerce and Navigation Between Chile and Peru (1877) =

Treaty between Chile and Peru (1877)

The Treaty of Friendship, Commerce and Navigation between Chile and Peru was a draft treaty aimed at strengthening relations between Chile and Peru and benefiting both countries' citizens.

== Background ==
The project was signed on December 22, 1876, in Lima by representatives José Antonio García y García and Joaquín Godoy Cruz. The Congress of Peru approved the treaty, but in Chile it was not ratified by Congress.

== See also ==
- Treaty of Defensive Alliance (Bolivia–Peru)
- War of the Pacific

== Bibliography ==
- Proyecto de Tratado de Amistad, Comercio y Navegación entre Perú y Chile in the Library of the National Congress of Chile
