= Fabio Vio =

Chilean diplomat

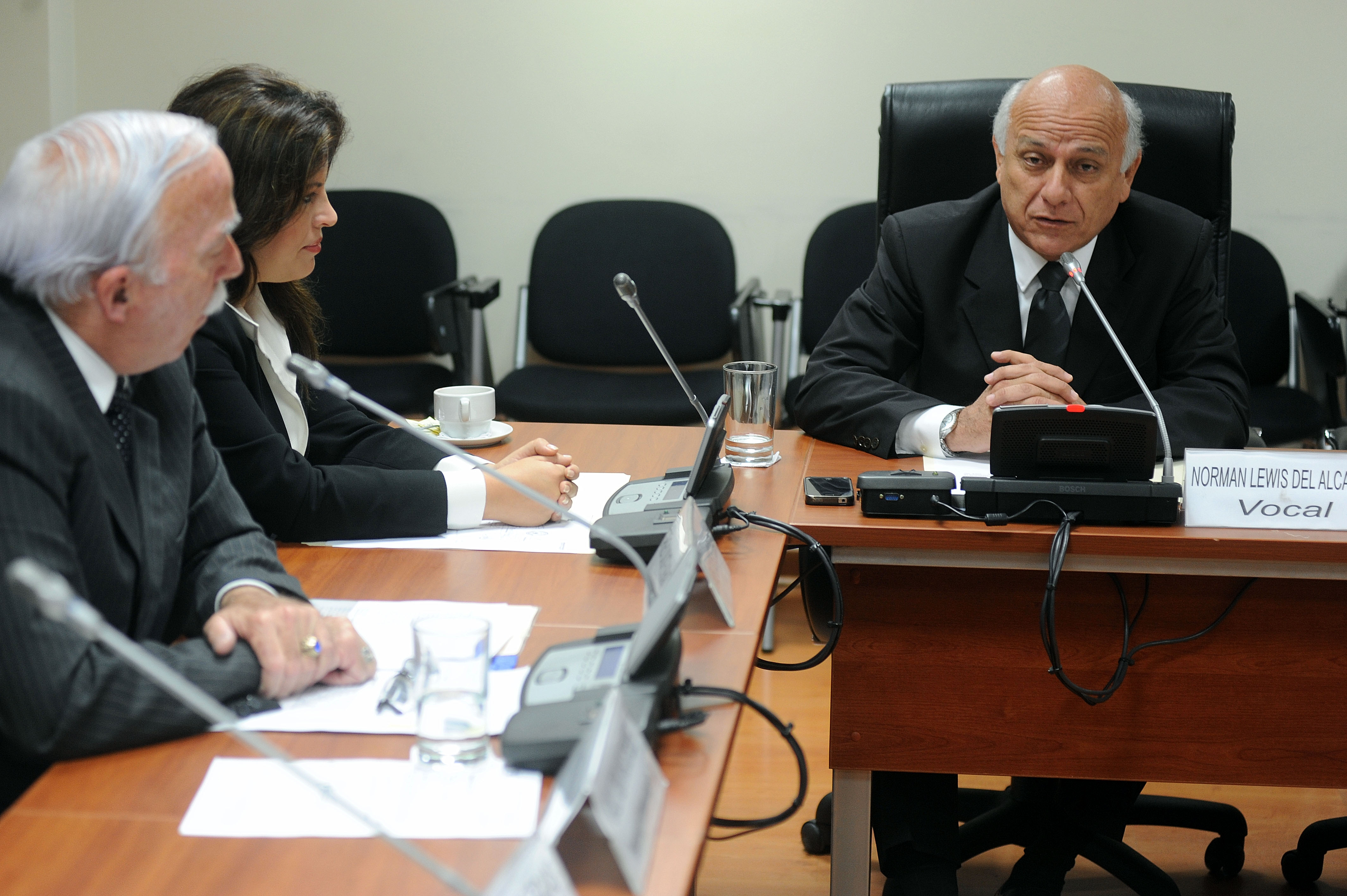

Ambassador of Chile to Peru
- In office 2008–2014
- Preceded by: Cristián Barros
- Succeeded by: Roberto Ibarra

Ambassador of Chile to Paraguay
- In office 2008–2008
- Preceded by: Emilio Tagle
- Succeeded by: Cristian Maqueira

Ambassador of Chile to Venezuela
- In office 2002–2006
- President: Ricardo Lagos
- Preceded by: Marcos Álvarez

Ambassador of Chile to Poland
- In office 28 June 2000 – 2002
- President: Ricardo Lagos

Ambassador of Chile to France
- In office 11 December 1997 – 28 June 2000
- President: Eduardo Frei Ruíz-Tagle (1994−2000); Ricardo Lagos (2000−2006)
- Preceded by: Juan Manuel Morales
- Succeeded by: Marcelo Schilling

Personal details
- Born: 1 January 1949 (age 77) Valparaíso, Chile
- Education: Pontifical Catholic University of Valparaíso (BA)
- Profession: Lawyer

Fabio Vio Ugarte (born 1949) is a Chilean lawyer who has served as ambassador of Chile in different countries. He has also gained prominence in Chile as an international analyst, specifically on the affairs of Peru.

Besides his native language, he also speaks English and French.

== Diplomatic career ==
In 1992, he was appointed Head of Bilateral Policy of the Ministry of Foreign Affairs. In 1994, he was appointed Director-General of Foreign Policy of Foreign Affairs, a position he held until November 1997.

From 1994 to 1997, he was a full member of the Council of Foreign Policy of his country as well as national coordinator of the Rio Group and national coordinator of the Conference of Ibero-American countries. From 1995 to 1997, he represented Chile as guarantor in the territorial controversy between Peru and Ecuador. As such, he signed the Brasilia Presidential Act in 1995.

In 1994, Vio was the Coordinator of Chile at the Summit of the Americas held in Miami. In 1996, he was Pro-Tempore Secretary of the Ibero-American Summit held in Santiago de Chile. In 1997, he represented to his country before the same pro-tempore mechanism of Mercosur.

From 1998 to 2000, he was the representative of Chile to the OECD Development Center. Similarly, from 1997 to 2000, Vío was ambassador to France.

From 2002 to 2006 he was ambassador of Chile to Hugo Chávez's Venezuela in replacement of the radical Marcos Álvarez, who recognized Pedro Carmona Estanga's de facto government after the 2002 coup attempt.

In 2008, he was appointed by President Michelle Bachelet as ambassador of Chile to Paraguay. Then, in October of that, Vio was appointed as ambassador to Peru.

== Decorations ==
- Commander of the Ordre national du Mérite from France.
- Commander of the Legion of Honour from France.
- Commander of the Order of May from Argentina.
- Commander of the Order of Civil Merit from Spain.
- Commander of the Order of Rio Branco from Brazil.
- Grand Cross of the Order of the Polar Star from Sweden.
- Grand Officer of the Order of San Carlos from Colombia.
- Grand Cross of the National Order of Merit from Ecuador.
- Decoration of Honour for Services to the Republic of Austria.
- Order of Merit of the Italian Republic
- Grand Cross of the Order of the Sun of Peru.
