= Marcial Martínez Cuadros =

Chilean politician (1832–1918)

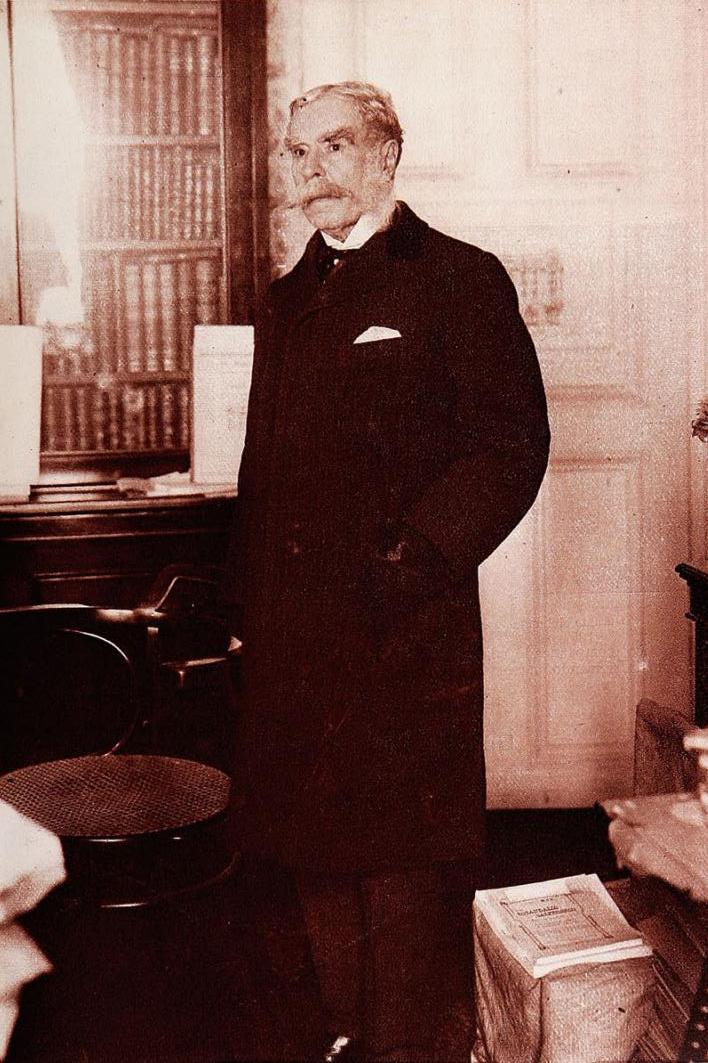

Vicepresident of the Senate
- In office October 6, 1884 – June 3, 1885

Personal details
- Born: July 30, 1832 La Serena, Chile
- Died: February 8, 1918 Santiago, Chile

Marcial Martínez Cuadros (La Serena, July 30, 1832 — Santiago, February 8, 1918) was a Chilean lawyer and liberal politician.

== Early life ==
He was the son of Victoriano Martínez and María Josefa Cuadros Pumarada. He married Constanza de Ferrari Prieto.

He studied humanities at the La Serena Institute; Then he was awarded a scholarship to study at the boarding school of the National Institute of Santiago, where he joined the Law course (1847). While studying Law he followed the Natural Sciences course under the direction of Ignacy Domeyko.

He received his law degree on August 11, 1855. His thesis was "Latitud de un Precepto de la Novísima Recopilación", and he was called to fill the rapporteurship of the Supreme Court of Justice.

In 1862 he joined the Faculty of Humanities of the University of Chile, where he collaborated as a teacher, dean and researcher of History.

== Career ==
He was elected Deputy for Curicó, Santa Cruz and Vichuquén (1864–1867), and at the time he joined the permanent commission of Government and Foreign Relations.

Later he was deputy for Constitución, Chile, Cauquenes and Chanco, in two consecutive periods (1867–1873). He was part of the permanent Election Qualifying Commission and the Government and Foreign Relations Commission.

He was appointed Minister Plenipotentiary of Chile in Washington, D.C., when the international policy of the United States tried to intervene in favour of the American company "Peruvian Company" during the War of the Pacific. Chilean historian Gonzalo Bulnes describes his style as naive, with fellow historian Mario Barros van Buren agreeing:

Anyone could be a victim of error like Minister Martinez, having just arrived in the country, without relationships, with little knowledge of the language, flattered in his vanity as a man and as an official by the demonstrations of the warmest sympathy.

He was elected Senator for the province of Aconcagua (1894–1900). He was a member of the permanent commission of Education and Charity, and that of Foreign Relations.

== Other activities ==
He collaborated in the press, especially in El Mercurio, Revista Forense, Anales de la Universidad, Boletín de Minería and other scientific publications; He wrote several pamphlets on topics of interest to him.

In 1880 he was a member of the Council of Public Instruction, until May 9, 1881. The University of Chile sent him on its behalf to the 4th Centenary of the University of Edinburgh, founded in 1582.

He was president of the Scientific Society of Chile; member of the Royal Spanish Academy; member of the Academy of Jurisprudence and Legislation of Madrid; member of the Society of Writers and Artists of Madrid; member of the Association of Men of Letters of Paris; member of the Cologne and International Institute of Brussels; of the Corps of Lawyers of Lima and Buenos Aires; of the Geographical Society of Porto; from the American Academy of Political and Social Science in Philadelphia; of the Berlin Society of Comparative International Law; and the Primary Education Society in Chile.

Doctor of Laws, a degree awarded by Yale University and another doctorate he received from the University of Edinburgh. King Luís I of Portugal decorated him with the Grand Ribbon of the Order of the Immaculate Conception of Vila Viçosa, which gave him the right to use the title of viscount. In Italy, he received the title of Arcadian of Rome.
