= Jacques Gabriel (painter) =

Haitian painter (1934–1988)

Jacques Gabriel (1934–1988) was a Haitian painter. A Port-au-Prince native, Gabriel studied at The New School for Social Research in New York City and received a scholarship to study in Paris, France. His works have been exhibited in the United States, Italy, Jamaica, Haiti, and at the Museum of Modern Art in Paris. In 1954, he joined Foyer des Arts Plastiques. He learned watercolors from Alex Jeanty, designing from Néhémy Jean and oils from Dorcely. Many authors from his native country mentioned him in his books. Gerald Alexis mentioned him in his book Peintres Haitiens. Alexis said

Gabriel's rigor and clear colors contrast with his strong, colorful personality

== Death ==
He died in 1988.
