= HMS Gabriel =

Five ships of the Royal Navy have borne the name HMS Gabriel, after the angel Gabriel. Two others were planned:

- HMS Gabriel (1410) was a ship purchased in 1410 and given away in 1413.
- HMS Gabriel (1416) was a ship launched in 1416. Her fate is unknown.
- HMS Gabriel (1417) was a balinger launched in 1417.
- HMS Gabriel (1575) was a discovery vessel in service in 1575.
- HMS Gabriel was to have been a Marksman-class destroyer, but she was renamed HMS Ithuriel before her launch in 1916.
- HMS Gabriel (1915) was a Marksman-class destroyer launched in 1915 and sold in 1921.
- HMS Gabriel was to have been an Algerine-class minesweeper, ordered in 1943 but cancelled in 1944.

== See also ==
- HMS Gabriel Harfleur
- HMS Gabriel Royal
