= Gibril (disambiguation) =

Gibril is an Egyptian Arabic variant of Gabriel. Gibril is the Egyptian equivalent of the traditional Arabic transliteration Jibril. For an Islamic interpretation of Gabriel / Jibril / Gibril, see Gabriel#Islam.

Gibril is also a common Arabic given name and surname. Notable people with the given name or surname include:

Given name

- Gibril Sankoh (born 1983), Sierra Leonean football (soccer) player
- Gibril Wilson (born 1981), American football player of Sierra Leonean origin

Middle name

- Musa Gibril Bala Gaye (born 1946), Gambian politician, economist, banker and diplomat

Fictional entities

- Gibril, an Azure Striker Gunvolt 2 character

== See also ==
- Gabriel (disambiguation)
- Jibril (disambiguation)
