= St. Gabriel's Church =

St Gabriel's Church may refer to one of these churches dedicated to the archangel Gabriel:

== Israel ==
- an alternative name for the Greek Orthodox Church of the Annunciation in Nazareth

== New Zealand ==
- St Gabriel's Church, Pawarenga

== United Kingdom ==
- St Gabriel's Church, Blackburn
- St Gabriel's Church, Bristol

=== London ===
- St Gabriel's Church, Aldersbrook
- St Gabriel's Church, Canning Town
- St Gabriel's, Cricklewood
- St Gabriel Fenchurch
- St Gabriel's Church, North Acton
- St Gabriel's Church, Pimlico
- St Gabriel's, Warwick Square

=== West Midlands ===
- St Gabriel's Church, Deritend
- St Gabriel's Church, Walsall
- St Gabriel's Church, Weoley Castle

== United States ==
=== Florida ===
- St. Gabriel's Episcopal Church (Titusville, Florida)

=== New York ===
- St. Gabriel's Roman Catholic Church (Bronx, New York)
- St. Gabriel's Church (Manhattan)
- St. Gabriel's Church (New Rochelle, New York)

=== Pennsylvania ===
- Old St. Gabriel's Episcopal Church, Douglassville
