= 1883 Chilean–Spanish Treaty =

Peace treaty between Chile and Spain

Treaty of Peace and Friendship between the Republic of Chile and Spain
- Type: Peace treaty
- Signed: 12 June 1883
- Location: Lima, Peru
- Effective: 21 May 1884
- Signatories: Chile; Spain
- Languages: Spanish

The Treaty of Peace and Friendship between the Republic of Chile and Spain (Spanish: Tratado de Paz y Amistad entre la República de Chile y España) was a peace treaty signed between Chile and Spain in the Peruvian city of Lima, then occupied by Chile. The treaty put an end to the state of war that existed between both states since the Chincha Islands War.

== Background ==
In 1867, Spain and Chile had reached a preliminary agreement to receive the warships embargoed by the British neutrality laws, which caused the diplomatic incident between Peru and Chile in 1868.

In 1871, an armistice was signed in Washington, D.C. between Spain and allies Peru and Chile. Later, at the beginning of the War of the Pacific, Spain signed the two treaties in Paris with Peru (August 14, 1879) and Bolivia (August 21, 1879), which ended the state of war.

In 1881, the Chilean government allowed the arrival of Spanish merchant ships to its ports in recognition of the protection provided by Spanish merchants to the Chilean victims of the Battle of Iquique.

== Treaty ==
The representatives for the treaty were Jovino Novoa for Chile and Enrique Vallés for Spain, who signed the treaty in the Peruvian city of Lima, during its occupation by Chile.

The treaty itself contains 5 articles that dictate peace, repeal the armistice of 1871, order to communicate it to the president of the United States and order to exchange the ratifications within a year.

Chilean president Domingo Santa María put it into effect in Chile on May 21, 1884.

== See also ==
- Treaty of Defensive Alliance (Chile–Peru)
- Treaty of Defensive Alliance (Bolivia–Peru)
