= Caroline Sylvia Gabriel =

British artist and painter

- Born: 19 August 1912; London, England
- Died: 1977 (aged 64–65)
- Education: Slade School of Art
- Known for: Painting, sculpture

Caroline Sylvia Gabriel (19 August 1912 - 1997) was a British artist and educator who published a number of text books.

== Biography ==
Gabriel was born in London and attended the North London Collegiate School before studying at the Slade School of Art where she was taught by Randolph Schwabe. Early in her artistic career she mostly painted in oils but later turned to sculpture, carving pieces in both wood and stone. Gabriel taught at Avery Hill College of Education and also conducted evening classes and published educational textbooks. She exhibited at the Royal Academy, with the Royal Society of British Artists and with the Society of Portrait Sculptors. She also exhibited with the New English Art Club and the Women's International Art Club. Brighton Museum & Art Gallery hold examples of her work.
