= Rony Gabriel =

Brazilian politician (born 1994)

Member of the Chamber of Deputies
- Incumbent
- Assumed office 1 February 2027
- Constituency: Rio Grande do Sul

Personal details
- Born: 11 July 1994 (age 32)
- Party: Podemos

Rony de Assis Gabriel (born 11 July 1994) is a Brazilian politician who was elected member of the Chamber of Deputies in 2026. He has been a municipal councillor of Erechim since 2025.
