= Carlos Martínez Sotomayor =

Chilean politician (1929–2006)

Carlos Martínez
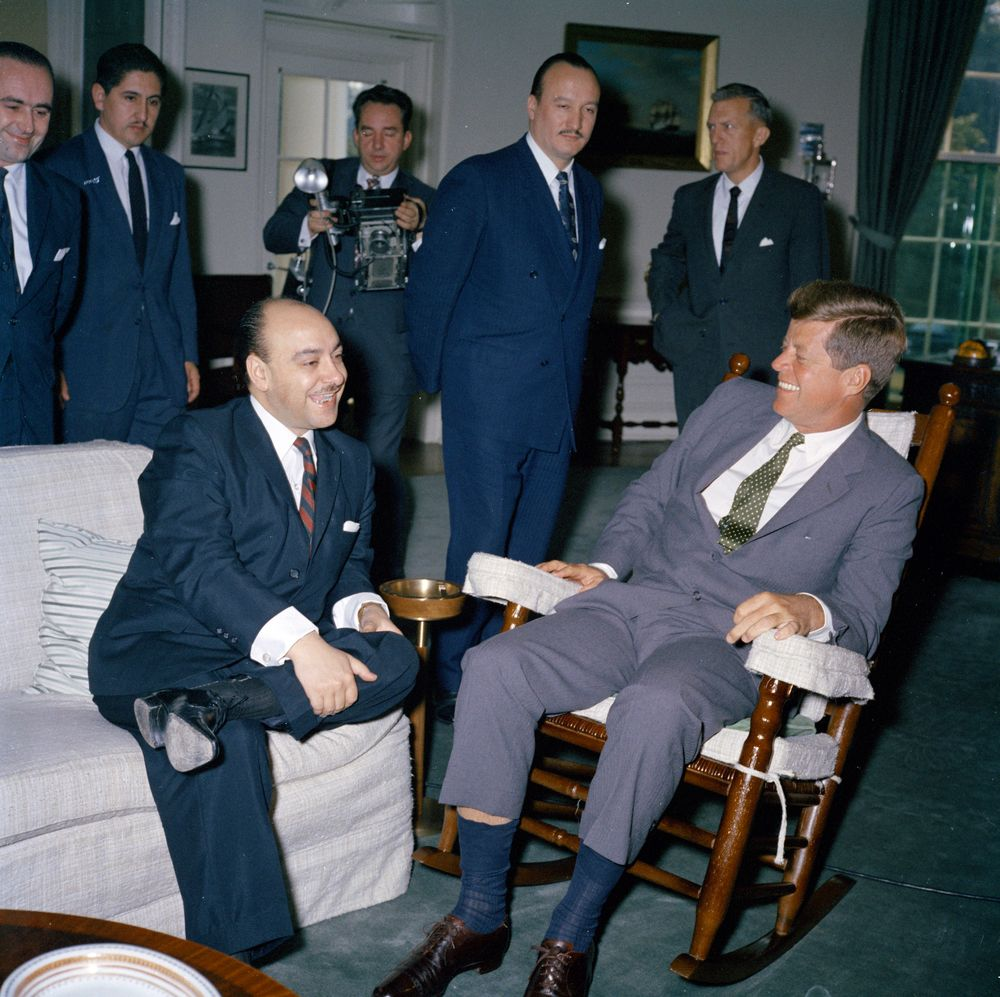
- Martínez with John F. Kennedy in 1961

Ambassador of Chile to Peru
- In office 1994–1997
- President: Eduardo Frei Montalva
- Preceded by: Alejandro Magnet
- Succeeded by: Francisco Pérez Walker

Ambassador of Chile to Brazil
- In office 11 March 1990 – 11 March 1994
- President: Patricio Aylwin
- Preceded by: Raúl Schmidt Dussaillant
- Succeeded by: Heraldo Muñoz

Minister of Foreign Affairs
- In office 26 August 1961 – 14 September 1963
- President: Jorge Alessandri
- Preceded by: Germán Vergara
- Succeeded by: Julio Philippi Bihl

Personal details
- Born: 7 August 1929 Copiapó, Chile
- Died: 24 February 2006 (aged 76) Santiago, Chile
- Party: Radical Party
- Education: University of Chile

Carlos Martínez Sotomayor (Copiapó, August 7, 1929 — Santiago, February 24, 2006) was a Chilean lawyer, academic, diplomat and politician. He served as Minister of Foreign Affairs during the government of President Jorge Alessandri.

== Early life ==
He was born in the Chilean commune of Copiapó on August 7, 1929, son of Carlos Martínez and Ester Sotomayor. He completed his primary and secondary studies at the Barros Arana National Boarding School in Santiago. He continued his studies in law at the University of Chile, where he graduated as a lawyer. In this house of studies he became involved in politics, becoming president of the youth wing of the Radical Party (PR).

He married Ana Emilia del Carmen Nogueira Cifuentes, with whom he had two children.

== Career ==
In the political sphere, on August 26, 1961, at the age of thirty-two, he became Minister of Foreign Affairs of his country at the request of President Jorge Alessandri, a position he held until September 14, 1963. Then, in 1964, he chaired the Chilean delegation to the first World Conference on Trade and Development. The following year, he was appointed as Chile's permanent representative to the United Nations (UN).

He became a member of the Economic and Social Council, the Commission on Human Rights and the UN Decolonization Committee. Since the end of 1974, he acted as general director of the United Nations Children's Fund (UNICEF) for the Americas based in Santiago and later, coordinator of the Regional Program on Marine Resources and Development of Latin America and the Caribbean, in the Economic Commission for Latin America and the Caribbean (ECLAC).

In 1989, in the context of the end of the military dictatorship of General Augusto Pinochet, he was his party's pre-candidate for the presidency of the Republic in view of the presidential election of that year.

Next, in 1990, he was appointed by President Patricio Aylwin as Chile's ambassador to Brazil, a function he held until the end of the government in 1994. He carried out the same work during the administration of President Eduardo Frei Ruiz-Tagle, but in Peru, from 1994 to 1997.

He was also a member of the Council of the University of Chile, of the board of directors of the University of Concepción and of the Council of the Institute of Chile. In addition, he was a corresponding member of the Royal Academy of Moral and Political Sciences of Spain.

He was the author of several books and numerous essays that deal with issues related to politics and international relations with Latin America. Among the published works, the following stand out: Las Naciones Unidas y la descolonización, El nuevo Caribe: La independencia de las colonias británicas, Reflexiones y testigos políticos, Chile en el ámbito de la cultura occidental. Throughout his professional and diplomatic career he was distinguished with decorations of merit, Honoris Causa doctorates, among which the Grand Cross of the Order of the Southern Cross stands out. Furthermore, in 1998, the University of Chile awarded him its highest distinction, the Rector Juvenal Hernández Jaque Medal.

He chaired the Chilean Academy of Social, Political and Moral Sciences of the Institute of Chile. In addition, he was a professor at the Institute of International Studies and a member of the Foreign Policy Council of the Chilean Foreign Ministry.

He died in Santiago on February 24, 2006, after having undergone surgery for a brain tumor, at the age of 76. His remains were laid to rest in the "San Francisco de Sales" parish and his funeral took place on the 26th at the Parque del memoria Cemetery after a mass held at 10 a.m.
