= Plaza de Gabriel Lodares =

Coordinates: 38.9904°N 1.8565°W

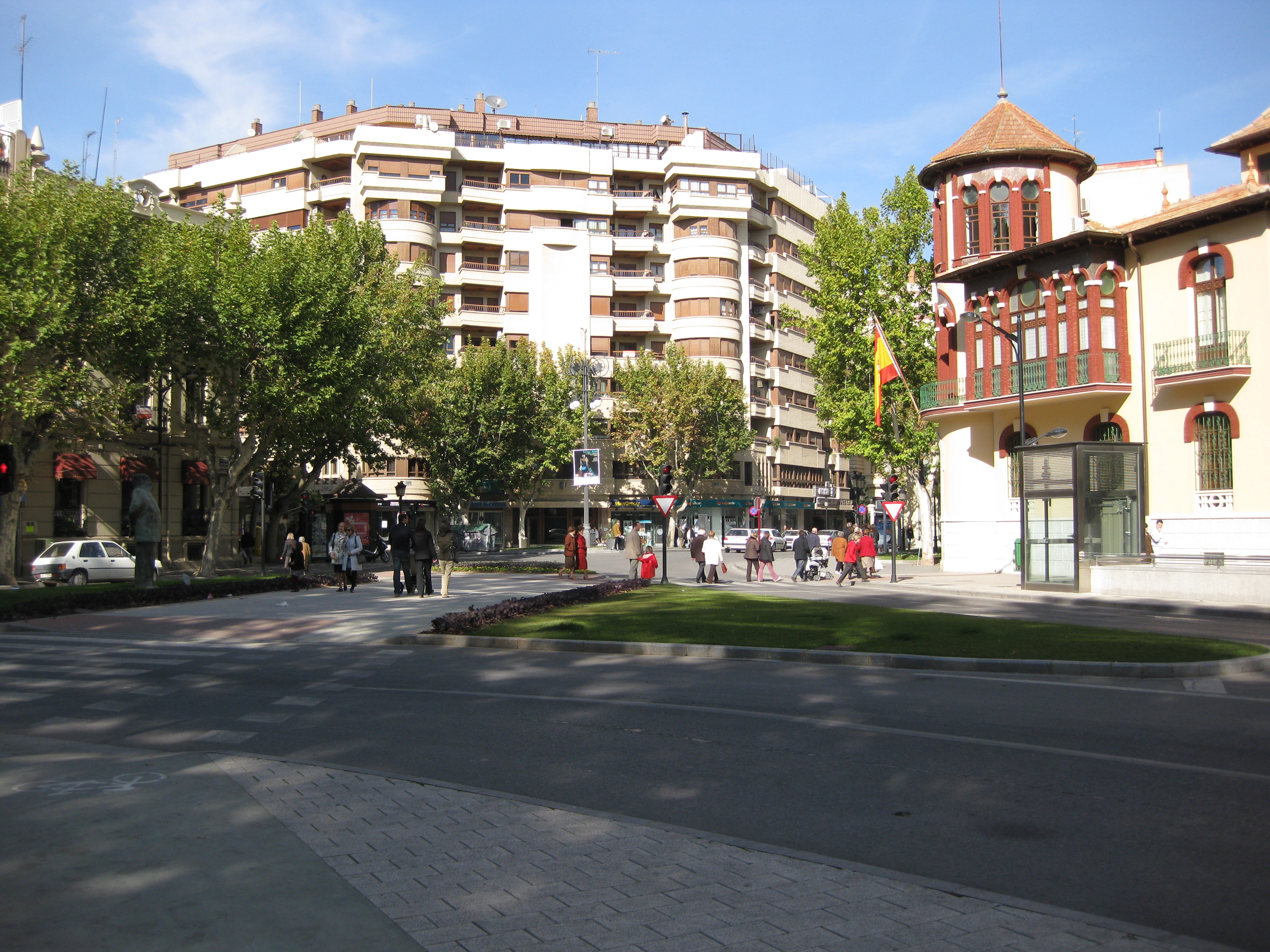
Plaza de Gabriel Lodares.

The Plaza de Gabriel Lodares (formerly called Plaza de Canalejas) is a square of Albacete (Spain) located in the center of the city.

It is located at the confluence of the calles Tesifonte Gallego, Paseo Simón Abril, Avenida de España y Octavio Cuartero, and is the main gateway to Parque Abelardo Sánchez.

Home to important buildings such as the headquarters of the Ministry of Defense in Albacete, the Casa de Archillas or the central delegation of Caja Castilla-La Mancha in the city. It is one of the busiest places of Albacete. In the past was called Plaza de Canalejas.

== History ==
The square is named after Gabriel Lodares Mayor of Albacete from 1900 to 1901 and from 1904 to 1906. The emblematic Fuente de las Ranas of Albacete was in the center of the square between 1916 and 1936.

The square houses the headquarters of the Ministry of Defense in Albacete, a unique building designed by the architect Daniel Rubio in 1920. It began as a sanatorium and later became a recruiting center for conscription and Military Government.

== The square today ==
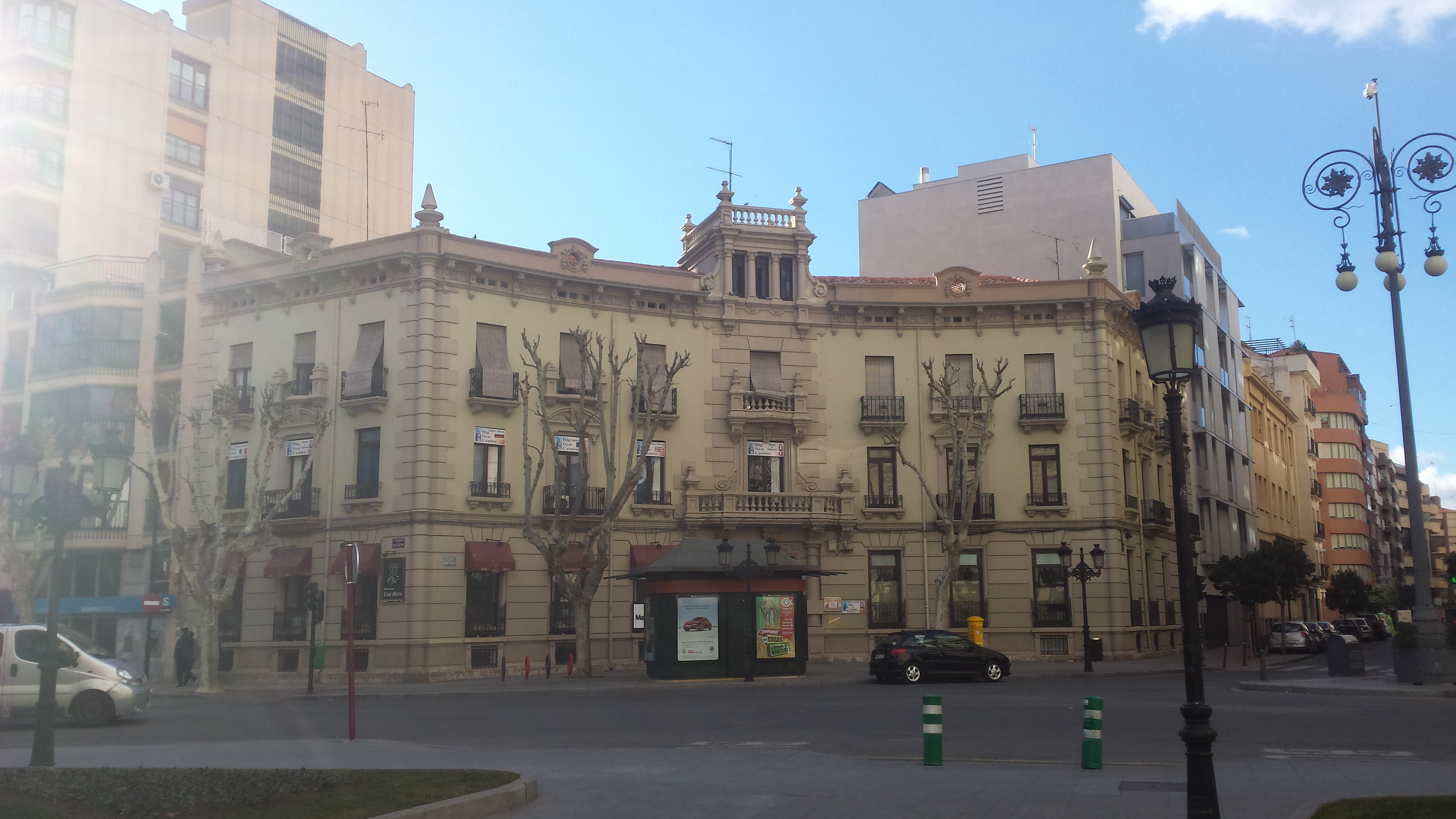
Casa de Archillas

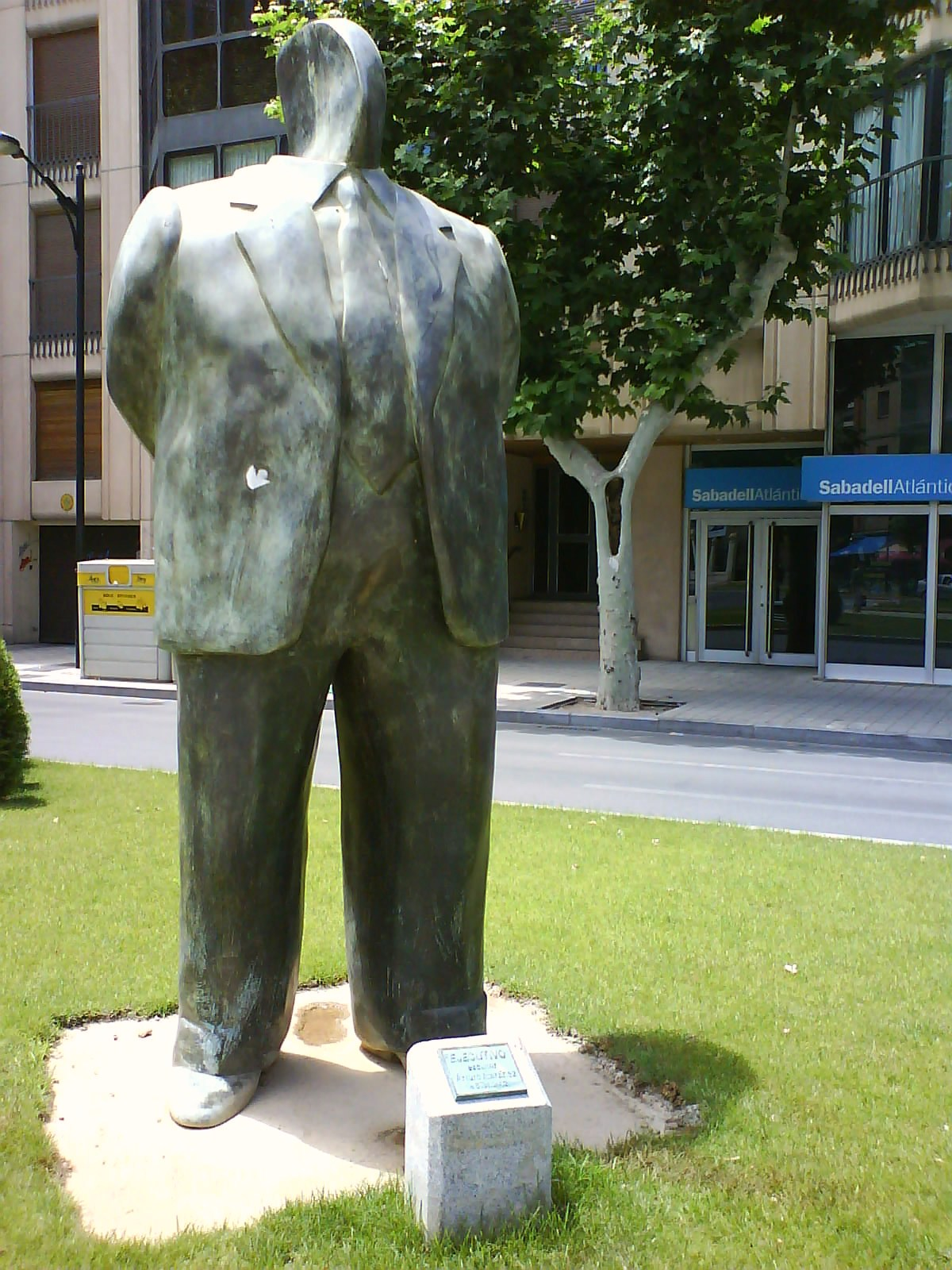
El Ejecutivo

The square has undergone in recent years to a number of improvements that have given its current appearance. It is one of the busiest areas of Albacete, confluence of some of the most important arteries of the city, such as Avenida de España or the calle Ancha. Is also the main gateway to parque Abelardo Sánchez, the lungs of the city.

Houses the headquarters of the Ministry of Defense in Albacete, the central delegation of Caja Castilla-La Mancha (CCM) and several modernisme buildings like the Casa de Archillas, emblematic palace of the 20th century.

== Culture ==
During the Christmas is located, in the center of the square, a large Christmas tree.

In Ash Wednesday is celebrated the Entierro de la Sardina, in which a falla shaped sardine (Doña Sardina) is moved with funeral procession from the Plaza de Gabriel Lodares to the Plaza del Altozano, where it is tried, convicted and burned
