= Gabriel (amplifiers) =

Amplifier manufacturer

Gabriel was an American manufacturer of boutique guitar amplifiers. Founded by former Romanian, now American citizen Gabriel Bucataru in 2005, the company produced expensive, hand-built, all-tube amplifiers that have earned praise from professional reviewers--Vintage Guitar hailed the "impeccable built quality" and the "high end/high quality vibe" of the Voxer 33, and Guitar Player called the Voxer 18 "ultra-rich" and "with more versatility than many vintage amps can muster."
In 2014 they announced that they have stopped all production.

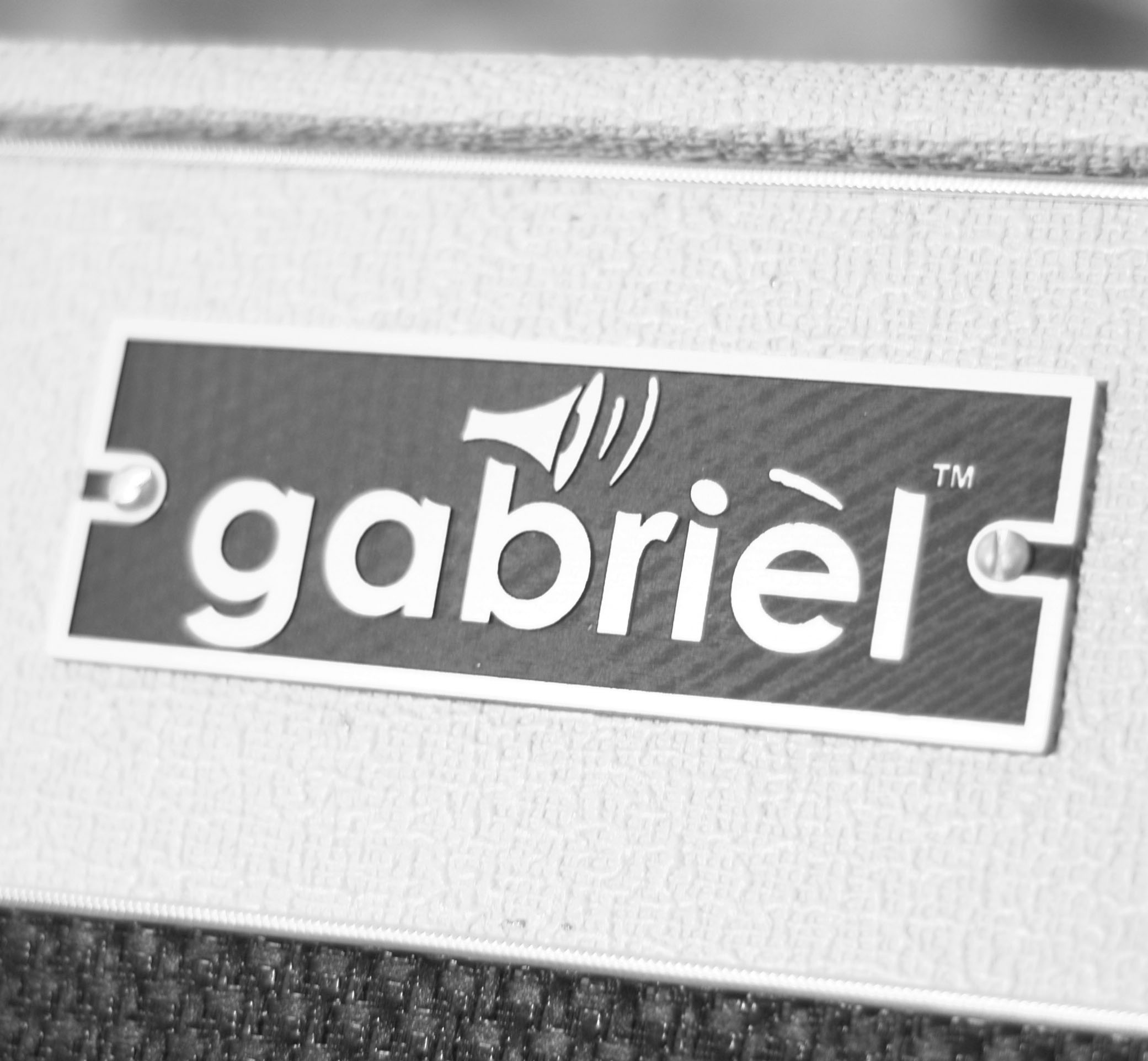
Gabriel's Sound Garage Logo

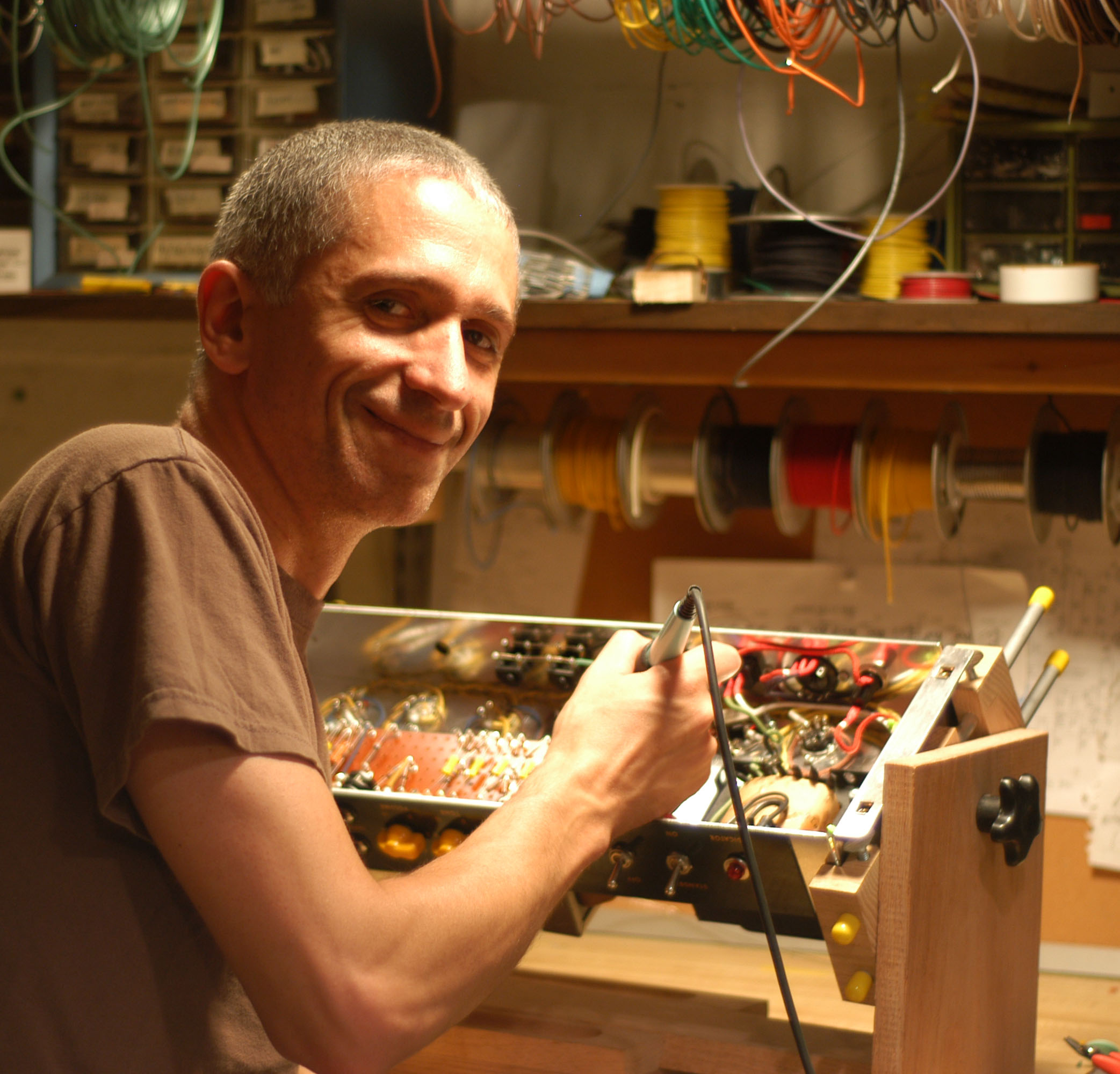
Founder/Owner Gabriel Bucataru at work in the Sound Garage

== Models ==
- Voxer 18, a two-channel 18-watt amplifier available as combo and as head (with a 2x12" cabinet). Channel one utilizes a 12AX7 for a Marshall-type sound, and channel two an EF86 for a Vox-type sound. The amp is also available in a "lite" version, with only the EF86 channel.
- Voxer 33, a two-channel 33-watt amplifier available as a head, or as a 1x12" or 2x12" combo.
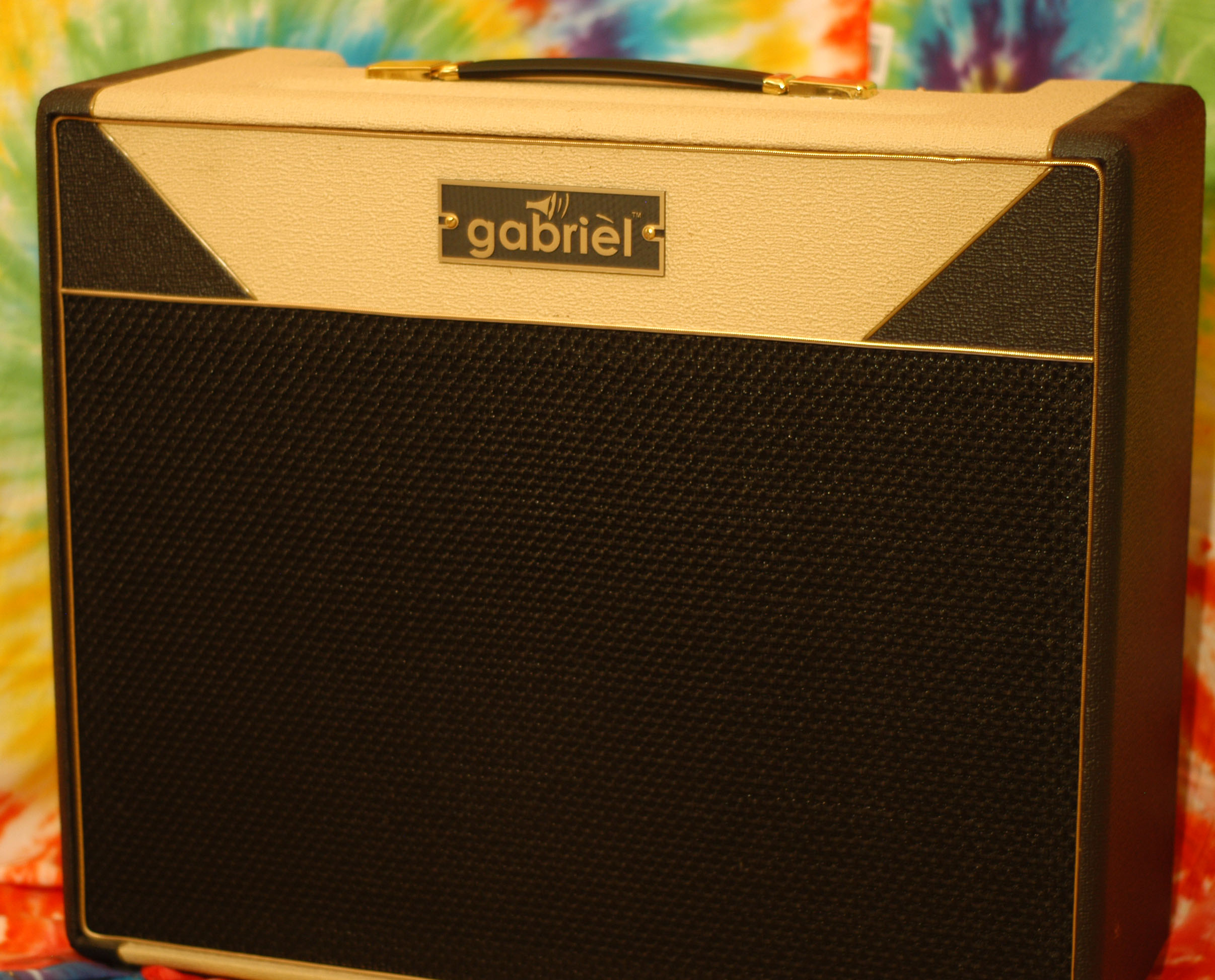
Gabtone Model V33 1x12" Combo Amp

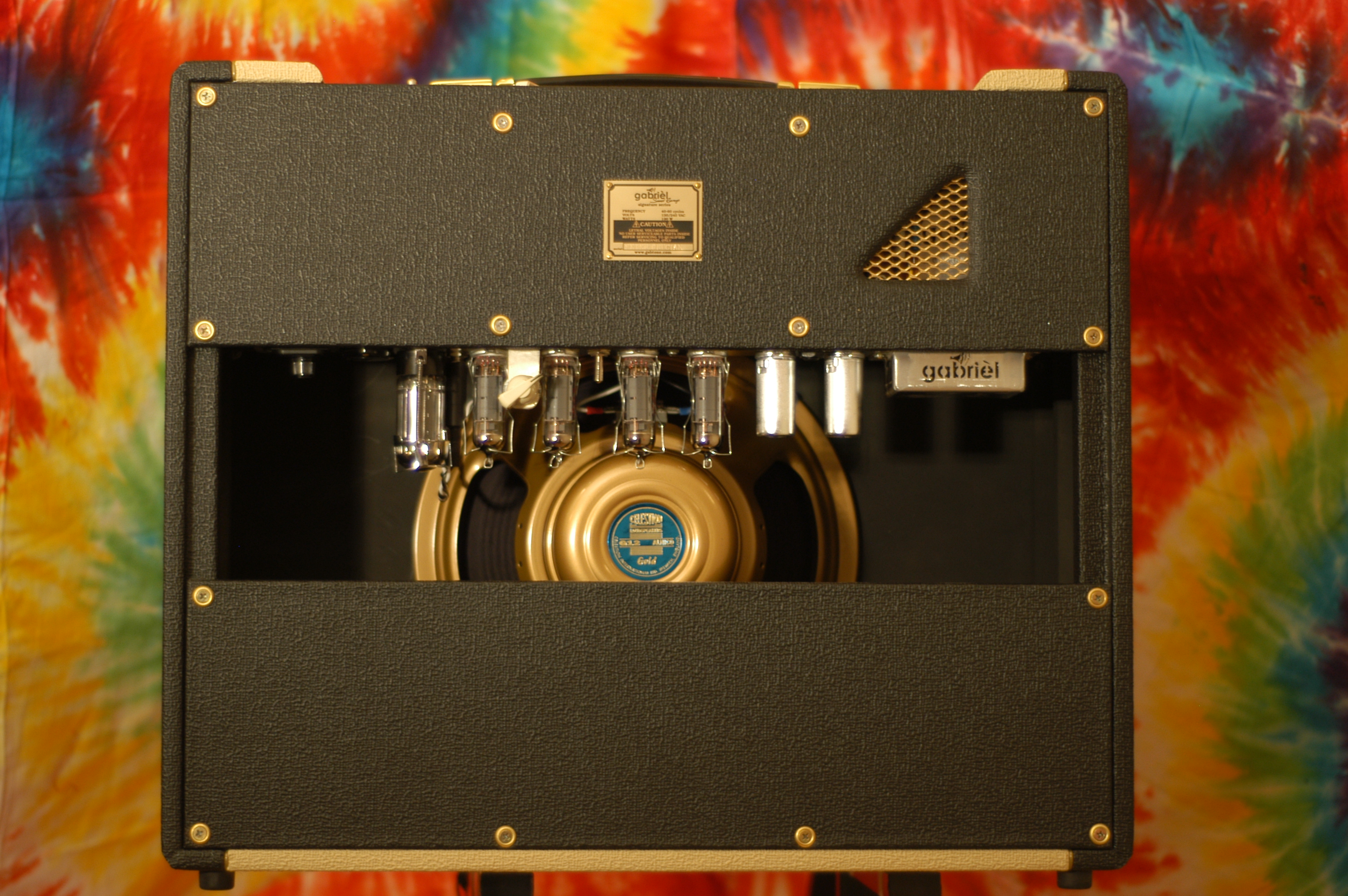
Back Side of Gabtone V33

== Notable users ==
- Vernon Reid of the rock group Living Colour
- Lyle Workman
- Pete Anderson
- MercyMe guitarists Michael Scheuchzer and Barry Graul
