= Djibril =

Djibril may refer to:

- A form of the given name Gabriel
- Djibril Cissé (born 1981), French footballer
- Djibril Coulibaly (footballer, born 1987), Malian footballer
- Djibril Coulibaly (footballer, born 2008), French footballer
- Djibril Sonko, Senegalese politician
- Djibril Sow (born 1997), Swiss footballer
- Djibril Thiam (born 1986), Senegalese basketball player
- Lord Djibril, a fictional character in the anime Mobile Suit Gundam SEED Destiny
