= Mario Barros van Buren =

Chilean historian and lawyer

- Born: October 28, 1928; Santiago, Chile
- Died: 2004 (aged 75–76); Chile
- Political party: Legión Nacional Funcionalista (1950–1952); Movimiento Revolucionario Nacional Sindicalista

Mario Barros van Buren (1928–2004) was a Chilean historian and lawyer.

== Biography ==
He studied at the Colegio de los Sagrados Corazones in Santiago, to begin his law studies at the Pontifical Catholic University of Chile, from which he graduated in 1952 with a memoir on the theory of just war. That same year he began working at the Ministry of Foreign Affairs, which sent him the following year to continue his studies at the University of Virginia.

In 1979 he received the "Hispanic Culture" award from the Spanish State.

In 1984, during the Ronald Reagan administration, he was rejected as Chilean ambassador to the United States for having been editor of a magazine considered anti-Semitic from 1948 to 1952. The claim was disputed by the subsecretary of the ministry, Humberto Julio, claiming that it was "absolutely false" that the U.S. government had made such a rejection while abstaining at the same time from answering whether such a nomination had actually taken place. The next day, Foreign Minister Jaime del Valle Alliende recognised that such a rejection did in fact take place, saying that what Julio had said was true, in the sense that Barros had not been "rejected either tacitly or explicitly."

== Selected works ==
Barros is known for his numerous works on the history of Chile. Among them:

- El derecho a la guerra (Teoría de la guerra justa según los escolásticos), Editorial Fach, Santiago (1959).
- El Ministerio de Relaciones Exteriores, apuntes para una historia administrativa, Editorial Minre, Santiago (1971).
- Raza y Espíritu, (Hispanic Culture Award, 1979)
- Historia diplomática de Chile (1541-1938), Prologue by Jaime Eyzaguirre, Barcelona, Ediciones Ariel (1970).
- La misión Eastman en el Ecuador, Editorial Casa de la Cultura Ecuatoriana, Quito (1966).
- Nuestras relaciones con Argentina, published in the Revista de Marina #842 (Jan-Feb 1998).
- La actividad naval durante la Guerra Civil Española, published in the Revista de Marina #830 (Jan-Feb 1996).
- El océano Pacífico. Una visión histórica, published in the Revista de Marina #817 (Nov-Dec 1993).
- La actividad naval del Reino de Chile, published in the Revista de Marina #816 (Sep-Oct 1993).
- Colón y la realidad europea, published in the Revista de Marina #810 (Sep-Oct 1992).
- Guerra civil y operaciones navales. El caso de Mauricio Hervey en 1891, published in the Revista de Marina #805 (Nov-Dec 1991).
- Presentación: Relaciones internacionales, published in the Revista de Marina #802 (May-Jun 1991).
- La estela del Bounty, published in the Revista de Marina #791 (Jul-Ago 1989).
- Limitación de armas, published in the Revista de Marina #784 (May-Jun 1988).
- La flota del Mar del Sur, published in the Revista de Marina #766 (May-Jun 1985).
- El pensamiento internacional de Portales, published in the Revista de Marina #757 (Nov-Dec 1983).
- La Diplomacia Chilena en la II Guerra Mundial. Lom Ediciones (1989).
