= Jimmy Friell =

Scottish cartoonist

James Friell (13 March 1912 in Glasgow – 4 February 1997 in Ealing) was a Scottish cartoonist who worked for the then Daily Worker. He used the nom de plume Gabriel because he wanted to herald the end of capitalism. Friell started drawing for the Daily Worker in 1936 railing against the evils of Hitler and Mussolini. In 1956, disillusioned, he left the paper after his cartoon comparing the Russian tanks in Budapest to the Anglo-French invasion of Egypt was rejected. He walked out along with many of the Daily Worker's editorial staff. "I couldn't conceive carrying on cartooning about the evils of capitalism and imperialism," Friell wrote, "and ignoring the acknowledged evils of Russian Communism."
