= Saint Gabriel's School =

Saint Gabriel’s School
- Type: Private
- Established: 1931
- Endowment: U.S. $ n/a
- Undergraduates: n/a
- Postgraduates: n/a
- Location: Santiago de Chile, RM., Chile
- Campus: Urban, n/a acres/n/a ha

Saint Gabriel’s School caters to some 2000 pupils aged 4–18 and offers courses to IGCSE and IB in the Senior School.

The school is coeducational and bilingual, with a secular philosophy, located in two branches since 2020 (four until 2019) and with one sports field. The last one mentioned is located in a residential area of up-town Santiago, with sports hall, club house, volleyball, football, rugby, hockey pitches included.

Saint Gabriel's is a member of ABSCH (Association of British Schools in Chile), IBO (International Baccalaureate Organisation), Founder Member of the National Committee of the United World Colleges (UWC) and member of LAHC (Latin American Heads Conference).

== External exams ==
The school offers external exams taken during different phases of the educational process of the students which gives them international recognition of their studies.

- PET
- IGCSE
- IB
