= Gabriel (given name) =

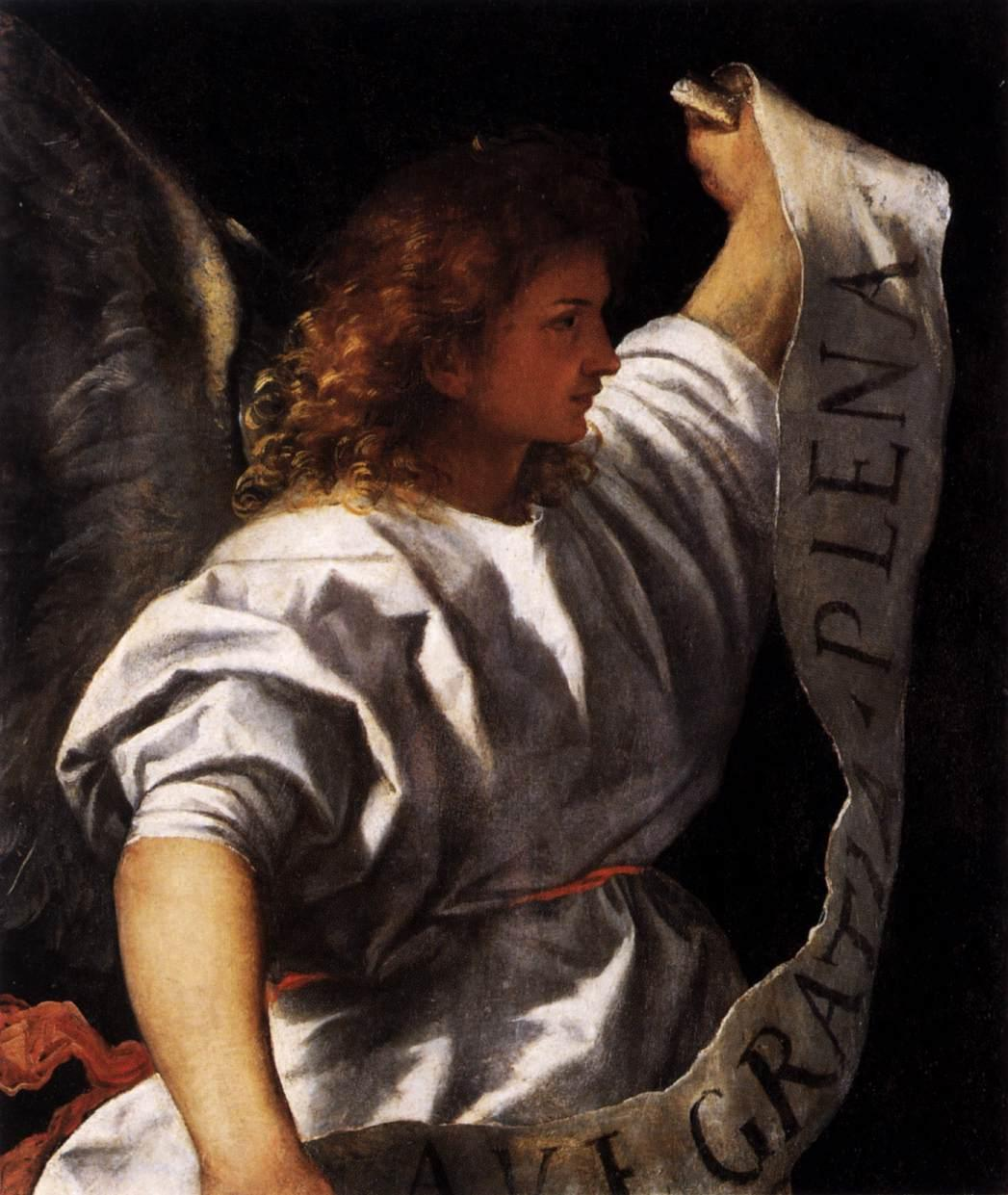
- Angel Gabriel
- Pronunciation: English: /ˈɡeɪbriəl/ GAY-bree-əl; French: [ɡabʁijɛl] Portuguese: [ɡɐbɾiˈɛɫ] Brazilian Portuguese: [ɡabɾiˈɛw] Spanish: [ɡaˈβɾjel]
- Language: Hebrew

Origin
- Origin: Hebrew גַבְרִיאֵל
- Meaning: "God is my strength"
- Region of origin: Israel

Other names
- Variant forms: Gabriella; Gabrielle; Gabrijel; Gabryel; Gabor; Jibril; Dzhabrail
- Nicknames: Gabe, Gabby

Gabriel is a given name from various borrowings of the Biblical Hebrew name of the archangel Gaḇrīʾēl (גַבְרִיאֵל), meaning "God is my strength".

== People named Gabriel ==
=== Royal houses, nobility and clergy ===
- Gabriel of Kakheti (died 881), Prince and Chorepiscopus of Kakheti
- Gabriel of Melitene (died c. 1102), Armenian general and ruler of Melitene
- Gabriel von Salamanca-Ortenburg (1489–1539), Spanish nobleman
- Gabriel de la Cueva, 5th Duke of Alburquerque (c. 1515–1571), Spanish nobleman and military leader
- Gabriel de Lorges, Count of Montgomery (1530–1574), French nobleman
- Gabriel de Luetz (died 1553), French Ambassador to the Ottoman Empire
- Gabriel de Rochechouart, 1st Duke of Mortemart (1600–1675), French nobleman
- Gabriel de Guilleragues (1628–1684), French politician
- Gabriel, 7th Duke of Aveiro (1667–1745), Spanish nobleman
- Gabriel II of Constantinople (died 1659), Ecumenical Patriarch of Constantinople
- Gabriel III of Constantinople (died 1707), Ecumenical Patriarch of Constantinople
- César Gabriel de Choiseul, Duke of Praslin (1712–1785), French officer, diplomat and statesman
- Infante Gabriel of Spain (1752–1788), Spanish Infante
- Prince Gabriel Constantinovich of Russia (1887–1955), Russian prince
- Prince Gabriel of Bourbon-Two Sicilies (1897–1975), Italian prince
- Prince Gabriel of Thurn and Taxis (1922–1942), German prince
- Gabriel Urgebadze (1929–1995), Georgian Orthodox monk
- Prince Gabriel of Belgium (born 2003), Belgian prince

=== Artists and entertainers ===
- Gabriel Bateman (born 2004), American actor
- Gabriel Braga Nunes (born 1972), Brazilian actor
- Gabriel Byrne (born 1950), Irish actor
- Gabriel Casaccia (1907–1980), Paraguayan novelist
- Gabriel Chevallier (1895–1969), French writer and novelist
- Gabriel o Pensador (born Gabriel Contino, 1974), Brazilian singer-songwriter and rapper
- Gabriel de Saint-Aubin (1724–1780), French artist
- Gabriel Fauré (1845–1924), French composer, organist, pianist and teacher
- Gabriel García Márquez (1927–2014), Colombian novelist
- Gabriel Iglesias (born 1976), American comedian and actor
- Gabriel Macht (born 1972), American actor
- Gabriel Morrissette (born 1959), Canadian illustrator
- Gabe Saporta (born 1979), Uruguayan-American musician
- Gabriel Soria (1908–1971), Mexican film director
- Gabriel von Max (1840–1915), Austrian painter
- Gabriel von Seidl (1848–1913), German architect

=== Athletes ===
- Gabriel Agbonlahor (born 1986), English football player
- Gabriel Almeida (born 1996), Brazilian footballer
- Gabriel Arteaga (born 1976), Cuban judoka
- Gabriel Bandeira (born 1999), Brazilian Paralympic swimmer
- Gabriel Barbosa (born 1996), Brazilian football player
- Gabriel Batistuta (born 1969), Argentine football player
- Gabriel Bortoleto (born 2004), Brazilian racing driver
- Gabriel Chade (born 1980), Argentine football assistant referee
- Gabe Cramer (born 1994), Israeli-Canadian-American baseball player
- Gabe Cupps (born 2004), American basketball player
- Gabriel Davalillo (born 2007), Venezuelan baseball player
- Gabe Davis (born 1999), American football player
- Gabriel de Moura (born 1988), Brazilian football player
- Gabriel Deck (born 1995), Argentine basketball player
- Gabriel Diallo (born 2001), Canadian tennis player
- Gabby Espinas (born 1982), Filipino basketball player
- Gabriel Eugénio Souza (born 1997), Brazilian football player
- Gabriel Europaeus (born 2005), Finnish footballer
- Gabriel Favale (born 1967), Argentine football referee
- Gabriel Geay (born 1996), Tanzanian distance runner
- Gabriel Enrique Gómez (born 1984), Panamanian footballer
- Gabriel Girón (born 1988), Mexican basketball player
- Gabriel Gonzaga (born 1979), Brazilian martial artist
- Gabriel Gudmundsson (born 1999), Swedish footballer
- Gabe Hall (born 2001), American football player
- Gabriel Hamer-Webb (born 2000), English rugby union player
- Gabriel Heinze (born 1978), Argentine football player
- Gabriel Hernández (disambiguation), several people
- Gabriel Jesus (born 1997), Brazilian football player
- Gabe Jeudy-Lally (born 2001), American football player
- Gabriel Johansson (born 2000), Swedish footballer
- Gabe Kapler (born 1975), American baseball manager
- Gabriel Landeskog (born 1992), Swedish ice hockey player
- Gabriel Lundberg (born 1994), Danish basketball player
- Gabriel Magalhães (born 1997), Brazilian football player
- Gabriel Martinelli (born 2001), Brazilian football player
- Gabriel Mendoza (born 1968), Chilean football player
- Gabriel Messner (born 1997), Italian snowboarder
- Gabriel Milito (born 1980), Argentine football player
- Gabriel Minadeo (born 1967), Argentine field hockey coach
- Gabriel Moiceanu (1934–2025), Romanian cyclist
- Gabriel Monteiro Vasconcelos (born 1996), Brazilian football player
- Gabriel Morency (born 1970), Canadian sports broadcaster
- Gabe Norwood (born 1985), Filipino basketball player
- Gabriel Obertan (born 1989), French football player
- Gabriel Oksanen (born 2006), Finnish-American football player
- Gabriel Olaseni (born 1992), British basketball player
- Gabriel Paulista (born 1990), Brazilian football player
- Gabriel Plascencia (born 2001), American football player
- Gabriel Popescu (footballer) (born 1973), Romanian football player
- Gabriel Rajkovic (born 2011), Norwegian footballer
- Gabriel Reis (born 1984), Brazilian water polo player
- Gabriel Rubio (born 2003), American football player
- Gabriel Sillanpää (born 2005), Finnish footballer
- Gabi Teichner (born 1945), Israeli basketball player
- Gabriel Varga (born 1985), Canadian kick boxer
- Gabriel (footballer, born September 1992), Brazilian football player
- Gabriel José Ferreira Mesquita (born 1998), Brazilian football player
- Gabe York (born 1993), American basketball player

=== Other ===
- Gabriel Al-Salem (1967–2010), American businessman and author
- Gabriel Arrúe (born 1999), Spanish politician
- Gabriel Attal (born 1989), prime minister of France (2024)
- Gabriel Aubry (born 1975), Canadian model
- Gabriel Biologia (born 1995), Brazilian politician
- Gabriel Boric (born 1986), former president of Chile (2022–2026)
- Gabriel de Broglie (1931–2025), French historian and politician
- Gabriel Cervantes, American politician
- Gabriel Costenaro (born 1993), Brazilian politician
- Daniel Gabriel Fahrenheit (1686–1736), Polish physicist and engineer
- Gabriel Garang Aher Arol, South Sudanese politician
- Gabriel Hardy, Canadian politician
- Gabriel Kaplan (born 1944), American comedian and poker player
- Gabriel Kisch (1917–1998), Romanian murder victim
- Gabriel Lippmann (1845–1921), Luxembourgish-French physicist and inventor
- Gabriel Marcel (1889–1973), French philosopher and playwright
- Gabriel Nkgweng, South African politician
- Gabriel Tomatis (born 1999), French politician
- Gabriel I. H. Williams, Liberian journalist
- Gabriel Weston (born 1970), English surgeon, author and television presenter

== Fictional characters ==
- Gabriel, the main antagonist of the video game Ultrakill
- Gabriel, the main antagonist of the YouTube series "The Mandela Catalogue"
- Gabriel, the recurring antagonist in the third season of the 1987 TV series Beauty and the Beast
- Gabriel, the protagonist of the video game Fable: The Journey
- Gabriel, one of the missing children from Five Nights at Freddy's
- Gabriel, a recurring character on the television series Supernatural
- Gabriel the Warrior, one of the main characters in Minecraft: Story Mode
- Gabriel Agreste, the main antagonist in Miraculous: Tales of Ladybug & Cat Noir, and the father of Adrien Agreste
- Gabriel Allon, the main protagonist of a series of books by Daniel Silva
- Gabriel Angelos, one of the main characters in the video game series Warhammer 40,000: Dawn of War
- Gabriel Ashlocke, the main antagonist of the second series of Mutant X
- Gabriel Belmont, the protagonist of the video game Castlevania: Lords of Shadow and its two sequels
- Gabriel Birid, the protagonist of the series Gabriel's Fire which was later revamped as Pros and Cons
- Gabriel Boutin, a character in Sally Green's trilogy Half Bad
- Gabriel Churchkitten, a fictional cat in the novels by Margot Austin
- Gabriel Cohuelo, also known as Velocidad, a Marvel Comics character
- Gabriel "Gabe" Duncan, one of the main characters in the Disney series Good Luck Charlie
- Gabriel "Gabe" Goodman, a character in the Broadway musical Next to Normal
- Grocer Gabriel, a character in the 2023 television series Rubble & Crew
- Gabriel Gray, the real name of the character Sylar, from the television series Heroes
- Gabriel 'Gabe' Jones, a character in Marvel Comics, and a member of the Howling Commandos
- The title character of Gabriel Knight, a PC game series
- Gabriel Lawrence, a character from the Ghost Whisperer
- Gabe Lewis, one of the supporting characters from The Office
- Gabriel Logan, the protagonist of the video game series Syphon Filter
- Gabriel "Gabo" Magtibay, a character from the 2026 Philippine television drama action comedy Coco Martin's Sigabo
- Gabriel May, the female protagonist's evil parasitic twin in James Wan's 2021 supernatural horror movie Malignant
- Gabriel Oak, one of the protagonists from Thomas Hardy novel Far from the Madding Crowd
- Gabriel Ignacio "Nachito" Ramirez, a character from Primos
- Gabriel Reyes, a playable character in the video game, Overwatch, under the alias "Reaper"
- Gabriel Rorke, the main antagonist of the video game Call of Duty: Ghosts
- Gabriel Santiago, a character in the Android: Netrunner universe
- Gabriel Santoro, of the novel Third and Indiana
- Gabriel Stokes, a character from the comic book series The Walking Dead and the TV series of the same name
- Gabriel Summers, a Marvel Comics villain better known as Vulcan
- Gabriel Tenma White, a character from Gabriel Dropout
- Gabriel "Gabe" Ugliano, Percy Jackson's stepfather in The Lightning Thief
- Gabriel Van Helsing, the protagonist of the 2004 film Van Helsing
- Gabriel Vaughn, the protagonist of the 2014 TV series Intelligence
- Gabriel, the baby protected by Jonas in The Giver

== See also ==
- Gabriela (disambiguation)
- Gabriella (disambiguation)
- Gabrielle (disambiguation)
- Gibril (disambiguation)
- Jibril (disambiguation)
