= Saudade Braga =

Brazilian politician (died 2024)

Mayor of Nova Friburgo
- In office 2001–2008

Personal details
- Born: 27 November 1948 Natal, Brazil
- Died: 8 May 2024 (aged 75)
- Party: Brazilian Socialist Party
- Relations: Glauber Braga (son)
- Children: Ivana and Glauber
- Education: Federal University of Rio Grande do Norte

Maria da Saudade Medeiros Braga (1948–2024) was a Brazilian politician. A doctor, she became the first female mayor of Nova Friburgo, serving two terms from 2001 to 2008. As a councilor and mayor, she focused her attention on education and improving public participation in government.

== Biography ==
Braga was born in Natal, in Rio Grande do Norte on 27 November 1948. She attended Federal University of Rio Grande do Norte and graduated with a degree in medicine in 1972. She moved to Nova Friburgo after her graduation. There, she worked as a doctor, primarily in rural areas. With her husband Roberto she had two children, Ivana and Glauber Braga.

=== Political life ===
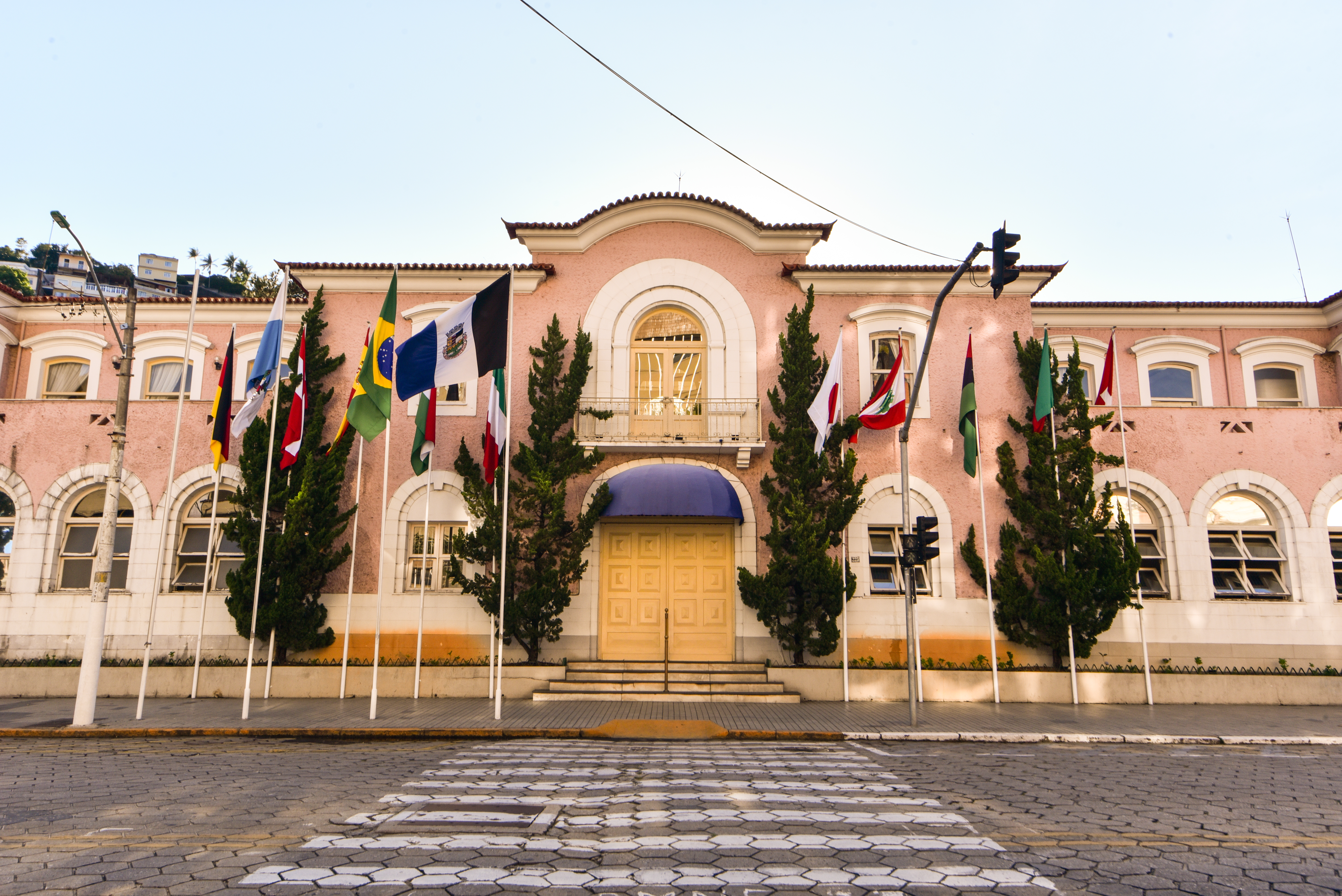
Nova Friburgo City Hall

Braga entered political life in 1988. She served as a councilor from 1992 to 1996, and then became the first female mayor of Nova Friburgo, from 2001 to 2008. In the 2000 election, Braga, a member of the Brazilian Socialist Party (PSB), was declared the winner after receiving 46,764 votes, an unprecedented number at the time.

As mayor, she was responsible for overseeing the new conservation corridor in Praça do Suspiro, developments to the Municipal Theatre, as well as improvements to the Raul Sertã Municipal Hospital. She focused her work on improving public participation in government, as well as improving education in her municipality.

=== False corruption charge and smear campaign ===
In 2012, she was convicted of corruption for advancing a rent payment to the city's Chess club to prevent the eviction of their premises. At the time, the chess club managed a municipal programme for senior citizens. She was sentenced to two years in prison. When the case was reviewed, Braga was unanimously acquitted on appeal. At the time, there were suggestions the false charge was politically motivated, even though Braga was out of office at the time. When her son Glauber Braga was an officeholder, the false claim of her corruption conviction went viral in the Brazilian press. Saudade Braga was additionally subject to further false claims politically motivated against her son, including that she was impeached for embezzling school lunch money and buying votes for her son's electoral campaigns.

=== Later life, death and legacy ===
On 8 March 2019, Braga was honored with the Heloneida Studart Citizen Woman Medal from the Nova Friburgo City Council for her contributions to political life in the municipality.

In 2021, Braga's son Glauber announced his mother was suffering from Alzheimer's disease, which had worsened during the COVID-19 pandemic. Braga died of Alzheimer's at age 75 on 8 May 2004. She was interred at Cemitério de São João Batista. After her death, Nova Friburgo mayor Johnny Maycon declared three days of public mourning in honor of Braga's contributions to the municipality's public life.

In November 2024, Braga's son Glauber Braga resigned from his position as president of the Participatory Legislation Committee after being subject to an ethics investigation. In April, Glauber Braga was accused of breaching decorum after expelling Free Brazil Movement member Gabriel Costenaro from the chamber. Braga claimed that he was provoked to breach decorum when Costenaro approached him and insulted his mother. At the time Saudade Braga was hospitalized and would die the following month.

In December 2024, Nova Friburgo opened “Galeria Dra. Saudade Braga", a public gallery honoring the contributions of councilwomen in Nova Friburgo in an effort to promote more women in politics.
