= Outsourcing law in Brazil =

Law in Brazil

Outsorcing law
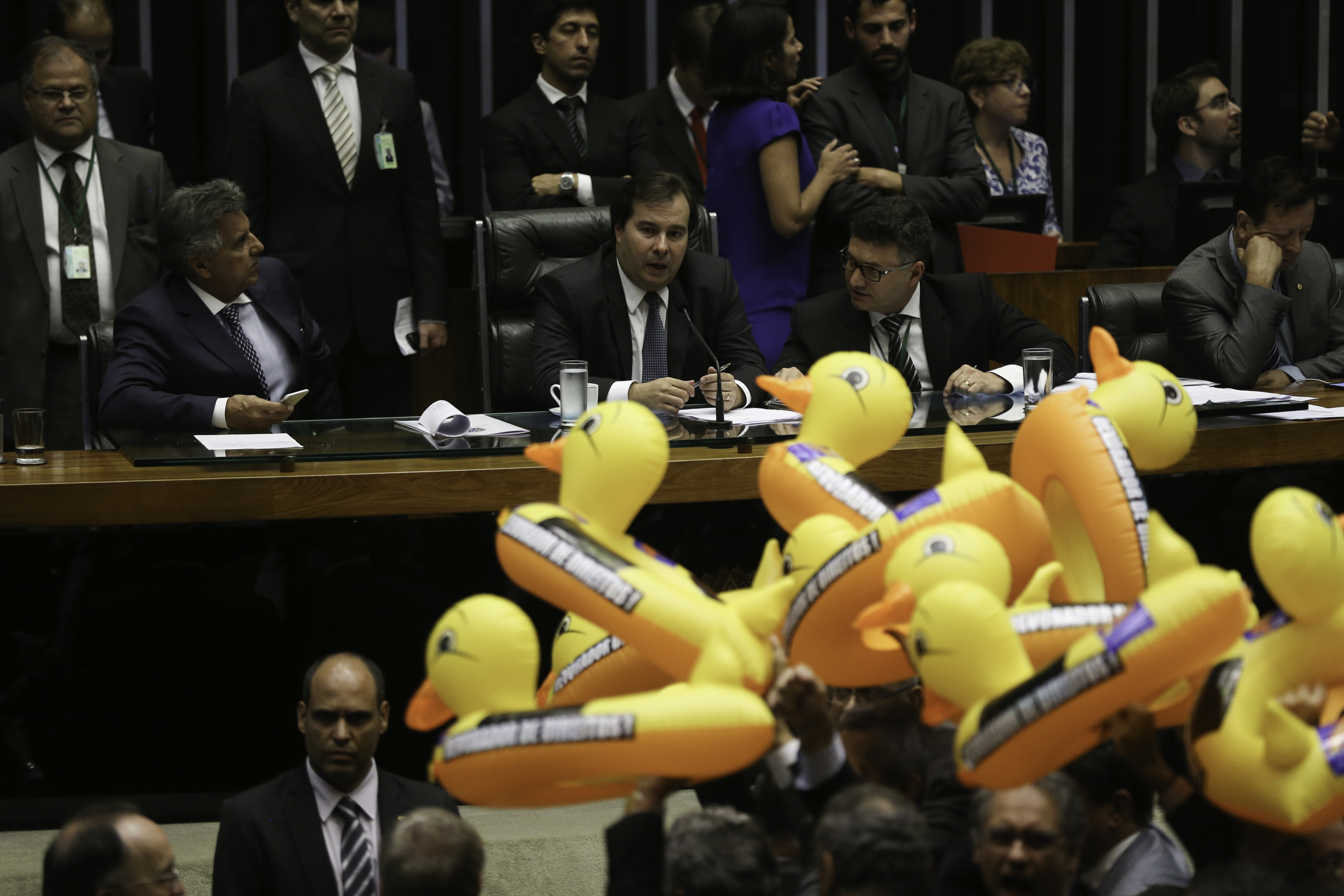
- Chamber opposition protests against the bill

National Congress of Brazil
- Long title: Disposes about labour affairs in temporary job companies and outsourcing companies and gives other providences
- Citation: PL 4302/1998
- Territorial extent: Whole of Brazil
- Passed by: Chamber of Deputies
- Passed: December 13, 2000
- Passed by: Federal Senate
- Passed: December 16, 2002
- Signed by: President Michel Temer
- Signed: March 31, 2017

Legislative history

First chamber: Chamber of Deputies
- Bill title: PL 4302/1998
- Introduced by: President Fernando Henrique Cardoso
- Introduced: March 19, 1998
- First reading: April 15, 1998
- Second reading: December 7, 2000

Second chamber: Federal Senate
- Bill title: PLC 3/2001
- Bill citation: PLC 3/2001
- Received from the Chamber of Deputies: January 3, 2001
- First reading: February 16, 2001
- Second reading: December 5, 2001
- Third reading: December 12, 2002

Keywords
- Labour law; Outsourcing
- Status: In force

The outsourcing law in Brazil, or Law Nº 13,429/2017, is a Brazilian law sanctioned (with three vetoes) on March 31, 2017 by president Michel Temer that allows companies to hire outsourced employees to work on primary activities, instead of secondary activities (such as maintenance or cleaning). Until then, there was no specific legislation regarding outsourcing, but decisions of the Labor Justice determined that outsourcing should only be allowed for secondary activities.

In the Chamber of Deputies, the bill 4,302 of 1998 was approved on March 22 of that same year.

The main proposal (outsourcing for primary activities) was kept. The bill also determined that, in cases of labor actions, the outsourced company ought to pay for the rights questioned in justice, if there is condemnation. The main vetoed part allowed the extension of the 270-day term of temporary employment. According to the government, that would allow the possibility of indefinite extension of the temporary employment contract. The other two vetoes, according to the government, were relative to laws there were already in the Constitution.

== Reception ==
=== Against ===
The leader of the Socialism and Liberty Party in the Chamber of Deputies, Glauber Braga, declared that "it's not about granting rights to the outsourced worker. It's about outsourcing all and any activity of the labor market, worsening labor relations and worsening rights". Moreover, the Anamatra (an association related to labor justice) saw the liberation of limitless outsourcing as unconstitutional, because the constitution defines a worker as a person not in those conditions.

=== For ===
The National Conference of Industry (CNI) said that the separation between secondary and primary work is only applied in Brazil and brings legal uncertainty. "The dichotomy between secondary and primary, without a clear definition of what is one and what is the other, motivates conflicts and increases the distance between Brazil and other countries. Furthermore, the choice of what to outsource must be of the company itself", stated Sylvia Lorena, executive-manager of CNI.

== See also ==
- 2015–2017 Brazilian economic crisis
- Brazil labor reform (2017)
- Brazil Fiscal reform (2016)
