= Glauber Braga =

Brazilian politician

- Braga in August 2017

Member of the Chamber of Deputies
- Incumbent
- Assumed office 1 February 2011 (Note: Suspended from 11 December 2025 to 16 June 2026.)
- Constituency: Rio de Janeiro

Personal details
- Born: Glauber de Medeiros Braga; 26 June 1982 (age 44) Nova Friburgo, Rio de Janeiro, Brazil
- Party: PSOL (2015–present)
- Other political affiliations: PSB (2001–2015)
- Domestic partner: Sâmia Bomfim (2020–present)
- Education: Euroamerican University Center

Glauber de Medeiros Braga (born 26 June 1982) is a Brazilian politician. He has spent his political career representing Rio de Janeiro, having served as federal deputy since 2011.

== Personal life ==
Braga is the son of Roberto Ricardo Braga and Maria da Saudade Medeiros Braga. His mother was a noted left-wing politician. Braga has described Carlos Marighella, Plínio de Arruda Sampaio, Luís Carlos Prestes, Olga Benário Prestes, and Zumbi as his role models.

In January 2020, Braga publicly announced that he was in a relationship with Sâmia Bomfim, federal deputy for the PSOL of São Paulo. In December 2020, Bomfim announced she was pregnant with the couples' first child, Hugo.

== Political career ==
Braga voted against the impeachment motion of then-president Dilma Rousseff. Braga voted in opposition to the 2017 Brazilian labor reform, and would vote in favor of opening a corruption investigation into Rousseff's successor Michel Temer.

Braga was a vocal opponent of law Nº 13,429/2017, signed by Temer which allowed companies to hire outsourced employees from outside the company for primary activities. Braga said "it's not about granting rights to the outsourced worker. It's about outsourcing all and any activity of the labor market, worsening labor relations and worsening rights".

In February 2020 Braga got into an argument with justice minister and judge Sergio Moro, as the two publicly traded insults in the Chamber of deputies. Braga called "militant henchman" who was defending Flávio Bolsonaro from corruption allegations while Moro claimed Braga was unqualified and that the PSOL party was the one protecting criminals. Éder Mauro then insulted Braga's mother Saudade Braga before the chairman Marcelo Ramos decided to call off the hearing.

During the heated debate on the proposal of amnesty for Bolsonaro on 9 December 2025, Glauber Braga briefly occupied the Speaker's chair in lower House of Brazilian Parliament, which he said was a protest against a "coup offensive".
