= Monkey Before Skeleton =

Painting by Gabriel von Max

Affe vor Skelett
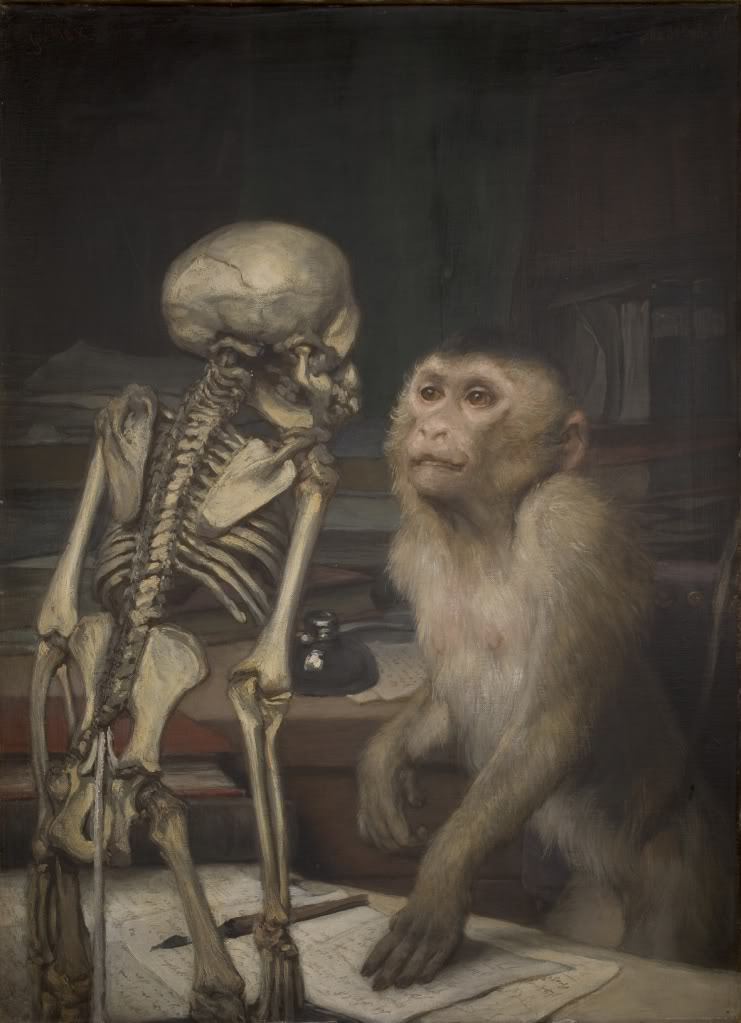
- Artist: Gabriel von Max
- Year: circa 1900
- Type: Oil, on canvas
- Dimensions: 61 cm × 44.5 cm (24 in × 17.5 in)

Monkey Before Skeleton (German:Affe vor Skelett) is the title of a painting by the Bohemian painter Gabriel von Max from around 1900. The 61 cm × 44.5 cm large work of art, painted with oil paints on canvas, shows a monkey facing a skeleton against the backdrop of a darkened interior. As part of Max's late work, the motif of the monkey can be found in a number of other depictions, which were created from 1871 until the artist's death in 1915. The painting is now in private ownership in Hamburg.

== Image description ==
The standing rhesus monkey is positioned frontally and in close proximity to the skeleton, which the viewer in front of the painting can only see from the rear. The monkey tied to the lower body is held in the moment of movement with economical but curious gestures. With his left hand he supports himself on the written notes and papers on the table in front of him. His right, on the other hand, appears less active and, in its angled and curled position, flatters more of the monkey's characteristic nature. A black quill pen is placed on the inscribed booklet, close to hand.

The skeleton is that of a juvenile chimpanzee. It is bent slightly forward in a similar posture, but is stabilized by a rod at the end of the spine. An inkwell and written leaves are shown in the center of the picture, which is framed by the primate and skeleton on the side. A striking red book can be seen through the skeleton. This motif is continued with two further books bound in red, ascending towards the back.

In the background, there are also a multitude of bound writings and loose sheets of paper on the table and shelves, which end in shadowy outlines with increasing distance and darkness of the room.

== Image interpretation ==
Differentiating from the medieval use of the monkey motif to indicate rascality or instinctuality, the primacy is shown here as a thinker who explores a skeleton. Lost in thought, the monkey's gaze turns slightly cross-eyed on the skeleton, which as a vanitas symbol indicates its own transience. It can be recognized as the object and result of research that is now next to the labeled sheet of evolution. The author of the documents shown remains uncertain.

Comparable to a monkey in front of a skeleton, color fidelity and attention to detail are decisive elements in most of his monkey paintings, which suggest naturalness and testify to the artist's recourse to living as well as prepared animals as study models. From 1870 the painter kept a group of monkeys in his own household, which he observed and studied. Detailed descriptions of their behavior, their cognitive progress and illnesses emerged. Many animals died due to the weather conditions in Munich, with the artist nailing some of the dead animals to wood to use as models for his paintings. Dissections too were carried out by him and then recorded in drawings. Some of the monkeys were given names such as his favorites Paly and Puk, who at times also wore clothes and ate at the same table. However, the artist did not travel to non-European countries, as he noted in his notebook from 1908: "I never got beyond Europe's cultural savages."

Despite the artist's concern to reproduce the nature of the monkeys realistically, as evidenced by the fine color transitions and accents of light, the painting Monkey in front of a skeleton looks a bit glossed over. This suggests the high rank and influence of history painting at the time . However, the monkey was no longer portrayed as an actor in the role of man, as was the case with the clothed monkeys of the Singerien, for example was common, but perceived as living beings with abilities that are hardly or not at all preserved in the human disposition. The boundaries between humans and animals are explored in more detail, whereby it is now also important to grasp the essence and thus the truthfulness of the monkey. Nevertheless, the reality shown is constructed in the painting, whereby the symbolic content of the primate persists in a modified form.

As a collector and intellectual, Gabriel von Max combined art with science in order to address issues of human ancestry and further development. Shortly before, the German sculptor Hugo Rheinhold followed a similar approach, who set similar thematic priorities (bronze sculpture of a monkey with a skull, 1892).

== Classification and literary models ==
Exploring the origins of man is a crucial component in Gabriel von Max's oeuvre. However, this backward-looking search is associated with a belief in the future that is based on technical innovation, such as the discovery of X-rays in 1895, and Darwinian theories. Various publications by Jean-Baptiste de Lamarck, Charles Darwin, Thomas Henry Huxley and the German zoologist Ernst Haeckels serve as literary sources . The latter creates a lively exchange of letters to discuss current studies, which also expresses mutual respect and admiration. Ernst Haeckel received the painting on his 60th birthday Pithecanthropus alalus, which finds its place in its private rooms.

As far as visions and visions of the future are concerned, however, the artist's interest in occultism and spiritualism should also be pointed out, which particularly determines the artist's first creative phase. As a strict opponent of vivisection, he continued to write down his observations and studies on the basis of notes throughout his life. The artist wrote in a letter to his youngest son Corneille Max on September 5, 1899 : "Now the natural scientists and vivisectors are meeting in Munich - these materialists all have a lot to answer for: the miserableness of Christianity is the result." The artist's aversion to epistemological materialism is clear here and expressing pure rationality. The monkey paintings are therefore on the one hand to be understood as documentation of his scientific work, which serves the continuation of the research topics, but on the other hand also illustrate psychological and spiritual ideas.

The relationship between humans and the environment is characterized by great advances in the area of zoology and the keeping and protection of animals in the 19th century . Gabriel von Max therefore proclaims, among other things, a closer relationship to nature and the animal world, which puts the existing hierarchical thinking of people behind, but does not inhibit scientific progress. Arthur Schopenhauer's writings are therefore also groundbreaking. In 1841, in his essay On the Basics of Morality, he formulated a new compassionate understanding of values towards other living beings.

== Literature ==
- Solly Zuckerman: The Ape in Myth & Art. Verdigris Press, London 1998, ISBN 978-1-902335-00-1 .
- Louise Lippincott, Andreas Blühm (eds.): Fierce friends. Artists and animals, 1750–1900. Exhibition catalog Van Gogh Museum Amsterdam / Carnegie Museum of Art Pittsburgh 2005–2006. Merrell Publishers, London a. a. 2005, ISBN 978-1-85894-300-8 .
- Louise Lippincott, Andreas Blühm (Ed.): Tierschau. How our picture of the animal came about. Exhibition catalog Wallraf-Richartz-Museum & Fondation Corboud, Cologne 2007, ISBN 978-3-930054-55-8 .
- Franziska Uhlig: Counter-magic. Gabriel von Max's interest in monkeys. In: Karin Althaus and Helmut Friedel (eds.): Gabriel von Max. Malerstar, Darwinist. Exhibition catalog in the Lenbachhaus and Kunstbau Munich 2010–2011. Hirmer Verlag, Munich 2010, pp. 316–329, ISBN 978-3-7774-3031-7 .
- Filip Aleš, Roman Musil: A true homunculus in the animal world. Gabriel von Max 'Affenbilder, in: Umění, 4 (2010), pp. 294–311.
- Jo-Anne Birnie Danzker (Ed.): Gabriel von Max. Exhibition catalog Frye Art Museum Seattle 2011. Frye Art Museum: In association with University of Washington Press, Seattle (Washington) 2011, ISBN 978-0-295-99146-7 .
- Francesca Kaes: The monkey in the picture. Monkey painting between observation and imagination in the work of Gabriel von Max. Unv. Bachelor thesis, Ruprecht-Karls-Universität Heidelberg 2011.
- Francesca Kaes: The Soul of the Monkey. Unv. Lecture, Geneva 2011.
- Angela Schürzinger: Gabriel von Max 'monkey pictures. On the influence of the theory of evolution conveyed by Charles Darwin and Ernst Haeckel. Master's thesis, LMU Munich: History and Art Studies, 39, 2012.
- Vernon Reynolds: Hugo's Philosophical Ape. IPPL [International Primate Protection League] News. 35 (2), Sept. 2008: 16–18, (as of February 23, 2012).
- Thomas Bach: Object of the Month November 2010. From the Ernst-Haeckel-Haus Jena (EHH). (As of February 23, 2012).
