= Gabriel Almeida =

Brazilian footballer (born 1996)

Personal information
- Full name: Gabriel Fernando Morais Casseres de Almeida
- Date of birth: 3 September 1996 (age 30)
- Place of birth: Santos, Brazil
- Height: 1.74 m (5 ft 9 in)
- Position: Attacking midfielder

Youth career
- 2003–2005: Sporting CP
- Tottenham Hotspur
- Flamengo
- 2011–2013: Manchester City
- 2013–2015: Corinthians
- 2015–2016: Atlético Paranaense
- 2016–2018: Internacional

Senior career*
Years	Team	Apps	(Gls)
2019	Bragantino	0	(0)
2020	Tupynambás	0	(0)
2020	Stretford Paddock FC	3	(0)
- * Club domestic league appearances and goals

Gabriel Fernando Morais Casseres de Almeida (born 3 September 1996) is a Brazilian professional footballer who plays as an attacking midfielder.

== Career ==
Almeida started his youth career in the ranks of Portuguese club Sporting CP, before moving to England with Tottenham Hotspur and then back to his homeland with Flamengo. 2011 saw Almeida return to England with Manchester City. He remained for fifteen months. However, midway through, in 2013, Almeida almost joined City's rivals, Manchester United. The move fell through, before his eventual departure in August 2013; despite the club's interest in a new contract. In January 2021, it was reported that City, who immediately refuted the claim, had paid Almeida's father in order to circumvent Premier League rules on signing youth players.

He then, back in Brazil, had spells with Corinthians, Atlético Paranaense and Internacional up until December 2018. In January 2019, Almeida started his senior career with Série B's Bragantino. He made his professional debut in a Campeonato Paulista draw with Ponte Preta on 27 March 2019; a month that saw him go unused on the bench five times. In January 2020, Almeida moved across Brazil to Tupynambás. He did not appear competitively in the Campeonato Mineiro, though was on the substitutes bench for a defeat to Tombense on 23 January.

On 5 October 2020, during the COVID-19 pandemic, Almeida returned to English football for the third time after joining Lancashire and Cheshire AFL side Stretford Paddock FC. Almeida made his debut for Stretford Paddock on 17 October against Hadfield Athletic. Further appearances occurred versus Moston Brook and Urmston Town Juniors.

== Career statistics ==
As of 13 January 2021.

Appearances and goals by club, season and competition
Club	Season	League			Cup		State League		League Cup		Continental		Other		Total	
Club	Season	Division	Apps	Goals	Apps	Goals	Apps	Goals	Apps	Goals	Apps	Goals	Apps	Goals	Apps	Goals
Bragantino	2019	Série B	0	0	0	0	1 (Note: Appearance(s) in the Campeonato Paulista)	0	—		—		0	0	1	0
Tupynambás	2020	Campeonato Mineiro	—		0	0	0	0	—		—		0	0	0	0
Stretford Paddock FC	2020–21	Lancashire and Cheshire AFL	3	0	0	0	—		0	0	—		0	0	3	0
Career total			3	0	0	0	1	0	0	0	—		0	0	4	0
