= Margot Austin =

American children's book illustrator

- Born: Margaret Helser; September 18, 1907; Portland, Oregon, U.S.
- Died: June 25, 1990 (age 82); New Fairfield, Connecticut, U.S.
- Education: National Academy of Design
- Occupations: Children's book illustrator, author

Margot M. Helser Austin (September 18, 1907 – June 25, 1990) was an American children's book illustrator, best known for her Churchmouse stories, a series of illustrated books about animals who live at a church.

== Early life and education ==
Margaret "Margot" Helser was born in Portland, Oregon, the daughter of Peter Frederick Helser and Maria (Maud) Campbell Helser (later Swisher). Esther Pohl Lovejoy signed her 1907 Oregon birth certificate. Her mother was a stenographer, born in Canada. Her parents divorced when she was young, and she was raised in her maternal grandparents' household in Portland. She attended St. Mary's Academy and the National Academy of Design in New York. She also studied with the Art Students League of New York.

== Career ==
Austin illustrated many children's books and contributed to magazines including Jack and Jill Magazine. Among her many books was a series about small animals in the church of Parson Pease-Porridge, beginning with E. P. Dutton's 1941 publication of Peter Churchmouse. Author Merab Eberle called Austin's Gabriel Churchkitten "an enchanting bit of abysmal foolishness" in a 1942 review. "Miss Austin writes with an instinctive tenderness and in a refreshing style," wrote one reviewer in 1944. "There is a gentle radiance about her charcoal drawings."

Austin's illustrations were exhibited at the Portland Art Museum in 1943. Her book Gabriel Churchkitten was adapted as an animated film short in 1944. The Churchmouse Stories were published in a single volume in 1956.

== Personal life ==
Margot Helser married fellow artist Darrel Raymond Austin in 1933. They had a son, Darrel Jr. She died in 1990 at the age of 82 in her home in New Fairfield, Connecticut. There is a box of her illustrations and publishing paperwork in the University of Minnesota Libraries.

== Publications ==
=== As author and illustrator ===
- Moxie & Hanty & Bunty (1939)
- Barney's Adventure (1941)
- Peter Churchmouse (1941)
- Effelli (1942)
- Gabriel Churchkitten (1942)
- Trumpet Churchdog (1943)
- Manuel’s Kite String, and other Stories (1943)
- Lutie (1944)
- Gabriel Churchkitten and the Moths (1948)
- Poppet (1949)
- The Three Silly Kittens (1950)
- Growl Bear (1951)
- First Prize for Danny (1952)
- William's Shadow (1954)
- Brave John Henry (1955)
- Churchmouse Stories (1956)
- Archie Angel (1957)
- Cousin's Treasure (1960)

=== As author ===
- Once Upon a Springtime (1940)
- Tumble Bear (1940)
- Willamette Way (1941)

=== As illustrator ===
- A Friend for Growl Bear
- David’s Silver Dollar (1940)
- Mother Goose Rhymes (1940)
- My Brimful Book (1960)
- The Very Young Mother Goose (1963)
