= Gabriel Al-Salem =

American international management consultant, author, and adventurer

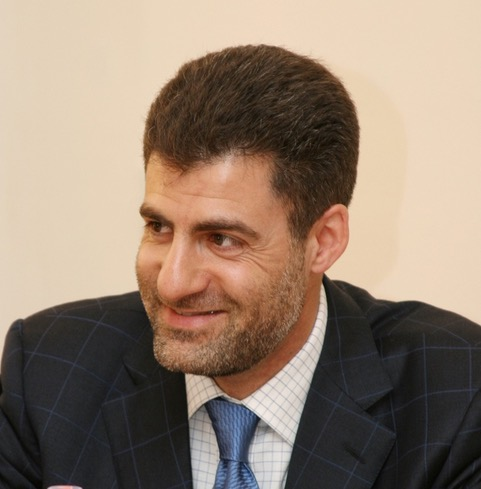
- Born: February 1, 1967; Oakland, California
- Died: November 27, 2010 (aged 43); Almaty, Kazakhstan
- Occupation: International management consultant
- Known for: Developing the consulting industry in Central Asia

Gabriel Al-Salem (February 1, 1967 – November 27, 2010) was an American international management consultant, author, and adventurer who had a large influence in establishing management consulting as a profession in Eurasian transitional economies and instituting the use of the internet for business in Kazakhstan.

Al-Salem worked as the director for the Business Advisory Services (currently Advice for Small Business) Programme of the European Bank for Reconstruction and Development in Central Asia for ten years. He contributed to the development of the consulting industry in the Central Asian region and was the first to provide formal training on business ethics to the consultants of Central Asia.

== Early life and education ==
Al-Salem was born in Oakland, California to Bader Al-Salem (1939—2012), a Kuwaiti architect, and Margarete Dorsch (born 1939), a German national and a professor of French and German. Al-Salem grew up with his mother in the United States. He attended elementary school in Columbia, Missouri, and in 1978, Al-Salem and his mother moved to Lindsborg, Kansas, where he lived until 1984. Al-Salem spent most of his senior year of high school in Versailles, France and part of it in Berlin, Germany. Upon his return from the year abroad he started his undergraduate studies at the University of Kansas (KU), majoring in Russian language and political science. Al-Salem spent the first semester of his junior year at KU in Bonn, Germany, where he completed an internship in the office of Egon Bahr, a German SPD politician and the specialist for east–west relations in the German government, and the second semester at the Leningrad State University (today Saint Petersburg State University). After graduating from KU, Al-Salem spent half a year touring with a children's theater company across the United States. Subsequently, he attended a semester-long seminar on the European Union in Tilburg, the Netherlands.

Al-Salem pursued an MA in Russian area studies at Georgetown University, where he also worked as a research assistant for his professor Angela Stent. He graduated in 1993, and his thesis focused on the implications of German reunification on Europe's relations with Russia and the countries of the former Soviet Union.

== Career ==
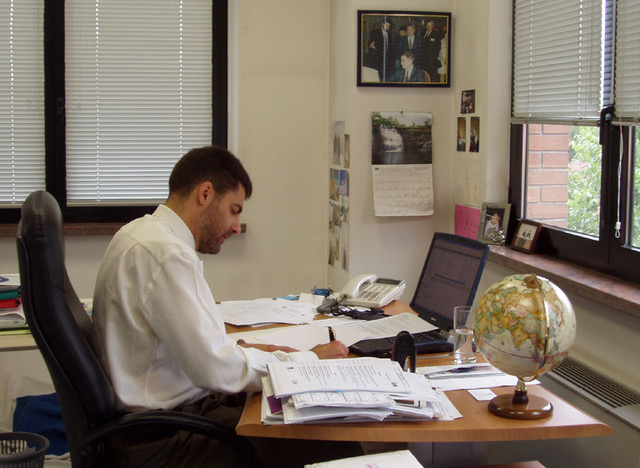
Gabriel Al-Salem in his office in Almaty, Kazakhstan.

Al-Salem worked on multiple international development projects around the world in the areas of privatization and economic reform. From 1994 to 1997, he worked as a project director for Ernst & Young LLP in Kazakhstan, where he led ongoing consultations to the government of Kazakhstan on privatization strategy, policy and implementation and provided assistance to the government in offering shares of key industrial enterprises to international investors through the Kazakhstan Stock Exchange.

From 1998 to 1999, Al-Salem worked as an associate for A.T. Kearney Management Consulting in Moscow, Russia and Berlin, Germany, where he led consulting engagements in Russia, Southeast Asia, the Middle East and the United States in market analysis, global benchmarking, and acquisition target identification. Moreover, he served as a trainer in the firm's Consulting Skills Training program.

From 1999 to 2001, Al-Salem worked as a manager for KPMG Consulting in Washington, D.C., where he served as the project manager and senior advisor on engagements in Vietnam, Montenegro (former Yugoslavia) and Mongolia.

From 2001 until his death, he worked as the Regional Director for Central Asia in the Business Advisory Services Programme of the European Bank of Reconstruction and Development. Here, he launched and directed a commercially oriented consulting services provision program that assisted more than 1,000 enterprises in hiring local consultants in Central Asia to solve business problems.

In September 2010, Al-Salem was awarded the title of Certified Management Consultant by the International Council of Management Consulting Institutes (ICMCI), joining the less than one percent of management consultants who meet the highest global standards and ethical canons of the profession.

In 2011, the ICMCI deemed Al-Salem's work in Central Asia "commendable and of pioneering nature" and awarded him the honorable title Member of the Meridian Order.

== Personal life ==
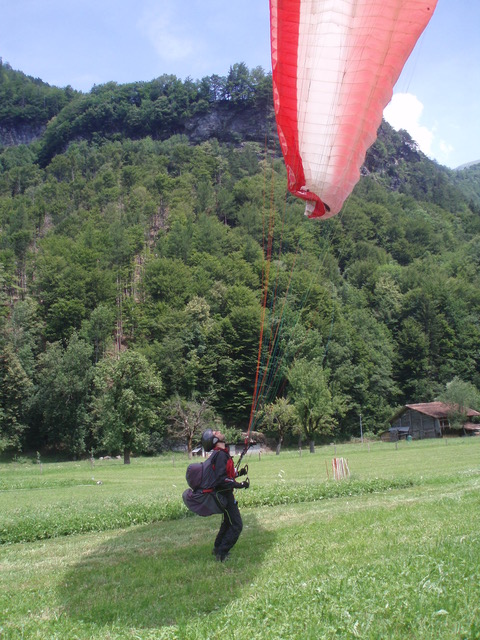
Gabriel Al-Salem with his paraglider.

=== Marriage and family ===
While studying at the Leningrad State University, Al-Salem met his wife, Viktoria Olskaia. They got married on May 23, 1992, and traveled the world working on various economic development projects. On January 16, 2000, their daughter, Anya Al-Salem, was born in Washington, D.C.

=== Activities ===
Al-Salem was an active mountaineer, skier, paragliding pilot, actor and musician. In 2002, he climbed the 7,010 meter mountain Khan Tengri. Moreover, he had over 150 hours of paragliding experience and competed in a number of paragliding competitions from 2005 to 2010. He was the first paragliding pilot to fly down from Talgar, a northern peak in the Tian Shan mountain range, after a multi-day ascent. In 2008, his writing on his experience paragliding over the Great Wall of China was published on the Wing China website and in the Cross Country magazine.

=== Death ===
On November 27, 2010, Al-Salem died in a paragliding accident on the northern slope of the Ushkonyr mountain in Almaty, Kazakhstan. He is buried in the Coronado Heights Cemetery near his hometown of Lindsborg, Kansas.

== Legacy ==
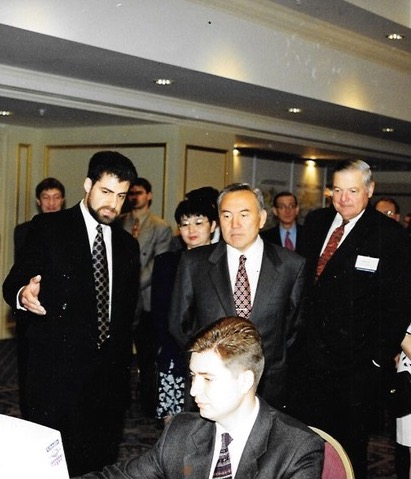
Gabriel Al-Salem demonstrating the website KAZECON to Kazakhstan's then-president Nursultan Nazarbayev at the Investors' Meeting in Almaty, Kazakhstan in 1997.

After Al-Salem's death in 2010, his colleagues created the annual Gabriel Al-Salem Award for Excellence in Consulting in honor of his work. Al-Salem's wife, Viktoria Olskaia, supported this initiative by establishing the Gabriel Al-Salem Foundation.

Al-Salem was recognized as one of the pioneers in the development of the internet sector in Kazakhstan due to his role in creating one of the first successful Kazakh business websites (KAZECON) in 1997 as part of the USAID-funded "Capital Markets Development and Privatization in Kazakhstan" project. The website won the nomination for social projects in the competition "FT Business Website of 1997" run by the Financial Times and the telecommunication company UUNET UK. Within one year the site had 500,000 page views and 15,000 frequent users and was considered a milestone for the development of the internet in Kazakhstan.
