= Gabriel von Max =

German painter (1840–1915)

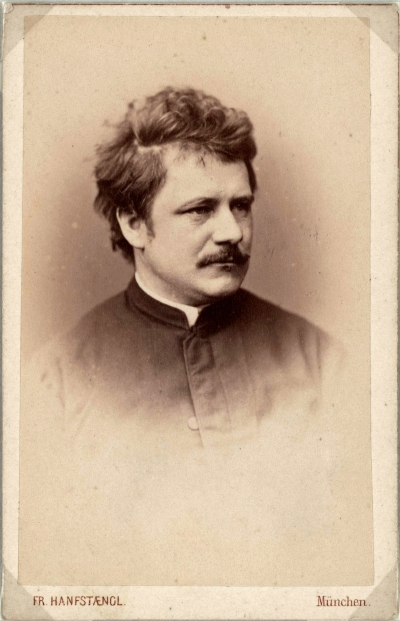
Gabriel von Max

Gabriel Cornelius Ritter von Max (23 August 1840 in Prague, Kingdom of Austria – 24 November 1915 in Munich) was a Prague-born Austrian-German painter, and professor of history painting at the Royal Academy of Fine Arts. He was also a collector of anthropological artifacts. His collection included between 60,000 and 80,000 objects from Zoology, Anthropology, Ethology, and Prehistory. The collection is displayed in the Reiss Engelhorn Museum in Mannheim.

== Biography ==
He was born Gabriel Cornelius Max, the son of the sculptor Josef Max and Anna Schumann. He received his first artistic training in history painting from his father.

He studied between 1855 and 1858 at the Prague Academy of Arts with Eduard von Engerth. His studies included parapsychology (somnambulism, hypnotism, spiritism), Darwinism, Asiatic philosophy, the ideas of Schopenhauer, and various mystical traditions. The spiritual-mystical movement was emphasized by the writings of Carl du Prel, and the Munich painter Albert Keller was also an influence.

Through Engerth's recommendation, Max was accepted at the Vienna Academy in 1858, where he studied with Karl von Blaas, Karl Mayer (painter), Christian Ruben and Carl Wurzinger. From 1863 to 1867 he studied at the Munich Academy with Karl Theodor von Piloty. Through fellow students Hans Makart and Franz Defregger he met Franz von Lenbach.

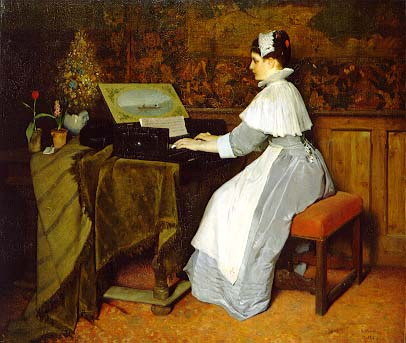
Still Life (Girl at a Spinet) (1871)

Gabriel von Max was a significant artist to emerge from the Piloty School, because he abandoned the themes of the Grunderzeitliche (genre and history), in order to develop an allegorical-mystical pictorial language, which became typical of Secessionist Art. His first critical success was in 1867 with the painting "Martyr at the Cross": that painting transformed the "Unglücksmalerei" (dark palette) of Piloty into a religious-mystical symbolism using a psychological rendering of its subject. He continued to use the dark palette of the Piloty school well into the 1870s, later moving toward a more muted palette, using fewer, clearer colors. Characteristic of the ethereal style of Gabriel Max is "The Last Token" (in the Metropolitan Museum), and "Light" (in the Odessa Museum of Western and Eastern Art, Ukraine).

On May 24, 1873, Max married Emma Kitzing (1840-1929), a Munich native whom he had met in 1864, in Traunstein. She gave birth to a daughter, Ludmilla (1874-1961), and two sons; the later painters Cornelius Georg (1875-1924) and Columbus Josef (1877-1970). In the same year he acquired a plot of land at what is now Paul-Heyse-Strasse 33 in Munich and had his brother-in-law in law, the architect Bela Benzcur, build a spacious city villa with a studio building behind it. Here he lived in seclusion with his wife and children. Summers he spent in Ammerland a part of Münsing on Lake Starnberg.

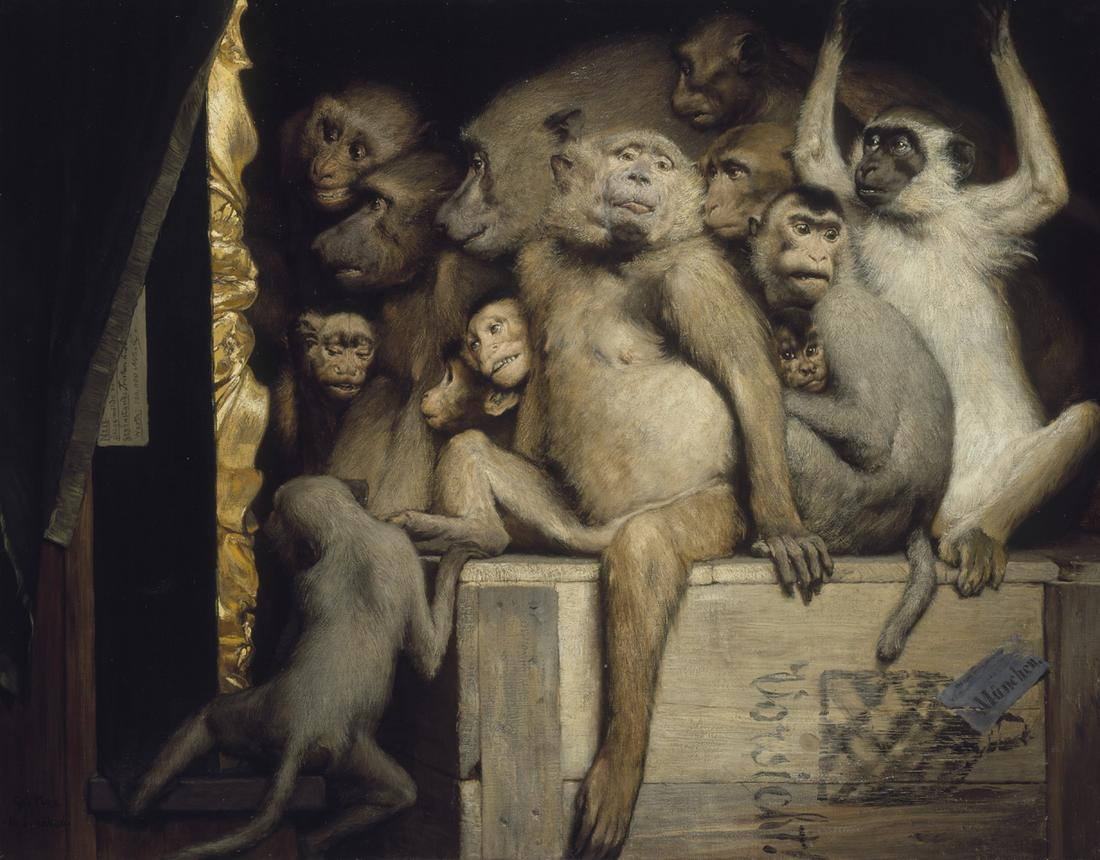
Monkeys as Judges of Art, 1889

From 1869 to about 1873, Max kept a herd of monkeys in a garden house in Schwanthalerstraße in Munich, which he photographed and sketched. The animals were cared for by his mother and his sister Caroline, who lived with him in Munich. They did not tolerate the Munich climate well and died rather quickly. Later he used the material for large paintings in which he sometimes depicted the animals as people. Max, along with his colleagues, often used photographs to guide painting. The great number of monkey photographs in his archive testify to their use as direct translation into his paintings.

In 1878 Max was appointed professor of history painting at the Munich Academy, but he gave this post back in 1883 because it took up too much of his time. He preferred to devote himself to his scientific research. In 1884 he joined the Lodge Germania of the Theosophical Society. He belonged to the preferred selection of contemporary artists whom the "Committee for the Procurement and Evaluation of Stollwerck Pictures" proposed to the Cologne chocolate producer Ludwig Stollwerck to commission for designs. Max enjoyed considerable success during his lifetime and could command almost any price for his paintings, but at the beginning of the 1890s, his star began to decline. Modern art movements such as Impressionism excited the public more than his classical painting. Max continued to paint, but it was now only a bread-and-butter occupation in order to further expand his costly anthropological collection.

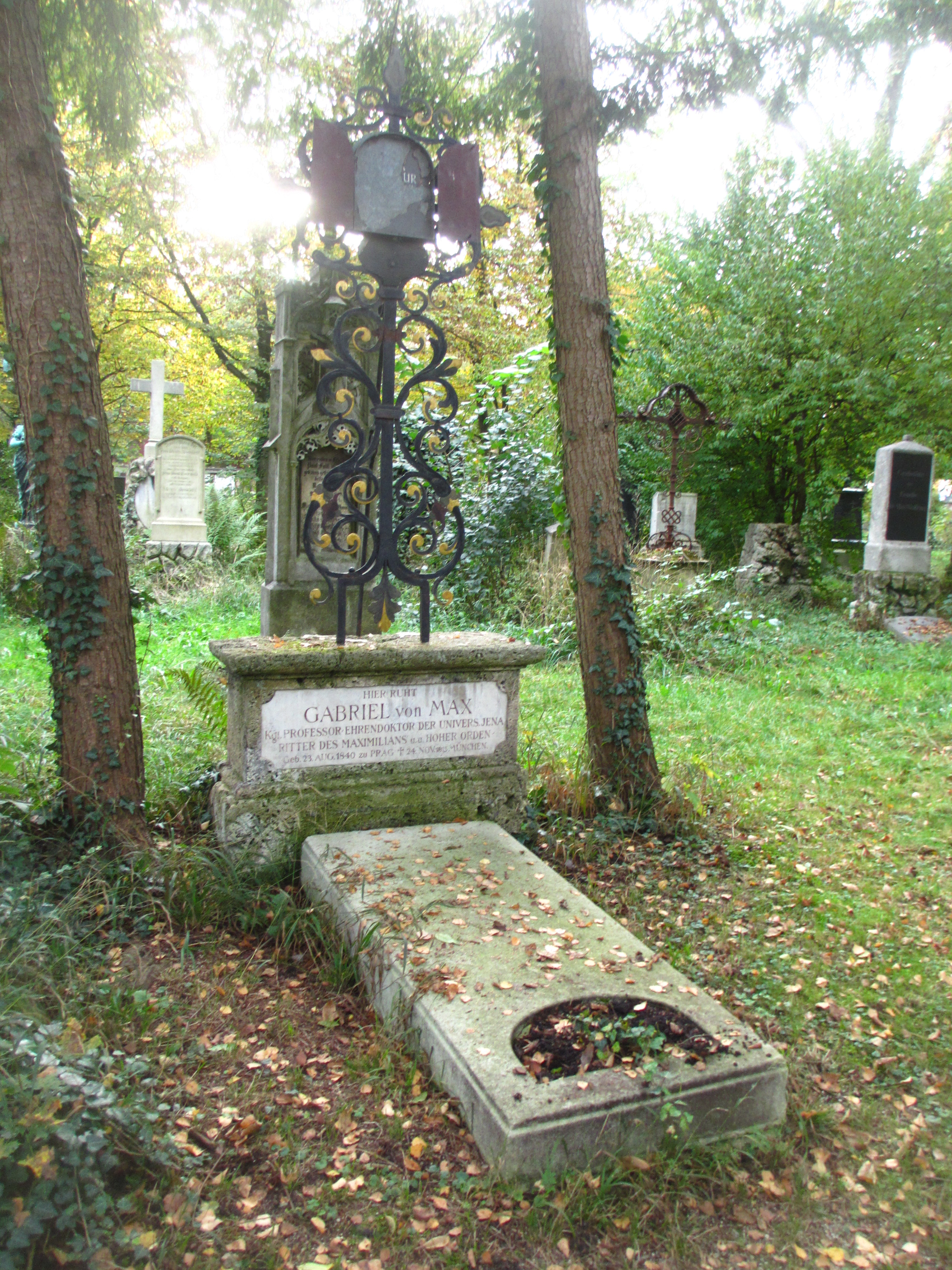
Gabriel Max's grave

In 1890, he divorced his first wife Emma and since then lived with his longtime lover Ernestine Harlander (1863-1938), with whom he had been having an affair since 1885/86. He married her in Munich in 1893. The spacious artist's villa with studio at Holzbergstraße 10 in Ambach on Lake Starnberg, which the couple bought in 1893, is now a listed building. Max and his wife retreated here more and more often to lead a secluded life. After his elevation to the Bavarian personal nobility effective December 2, 1900, he was only rarely in Munich, where he still maintained his collection in the studio building on Paul-Heyse-Strasse. He also became 1894 for a short time a Fellow of The Theosophical Society. He died in Munich in 1915 and is buried in the Old Southern Cemetery in Munich.

Gabriel von Max is known more for his art-making than for his collecting activities - although his collection was the basis for the Reiss Engelhorn Museum in Mannheim. He owned a large scientific collection of prehistoric ethnological and anthropological finds, including one of the largest collections of skulls of his time.

In 1908, his painting "The Lion's Bride" became celebrated, and was depicted in motion pictures as an hommage in the Gloria Swanson film, Male and Female, (1919), directed by Cecil B. de Mille.

== Villas ==
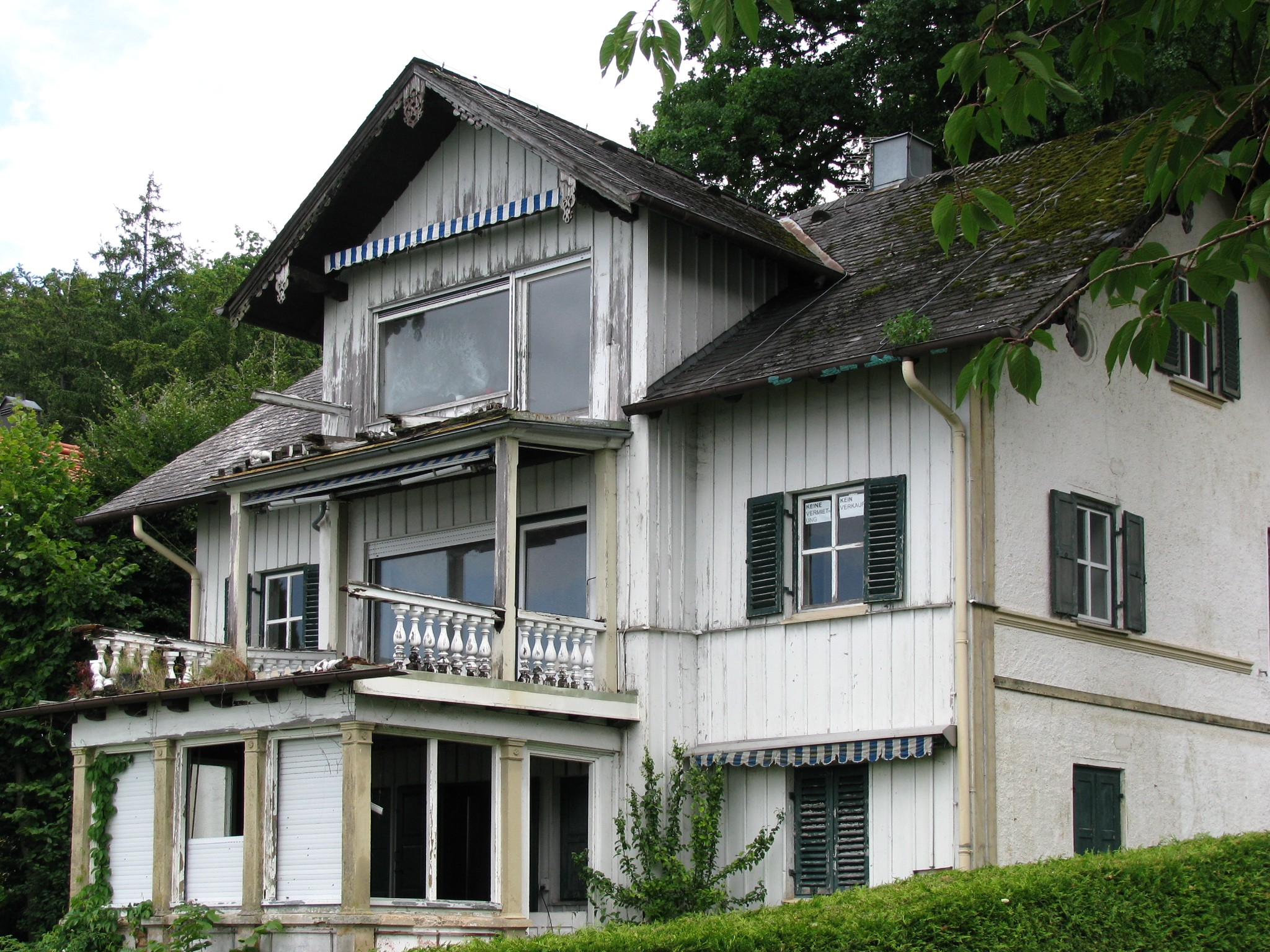
Max Villa, Ammerland

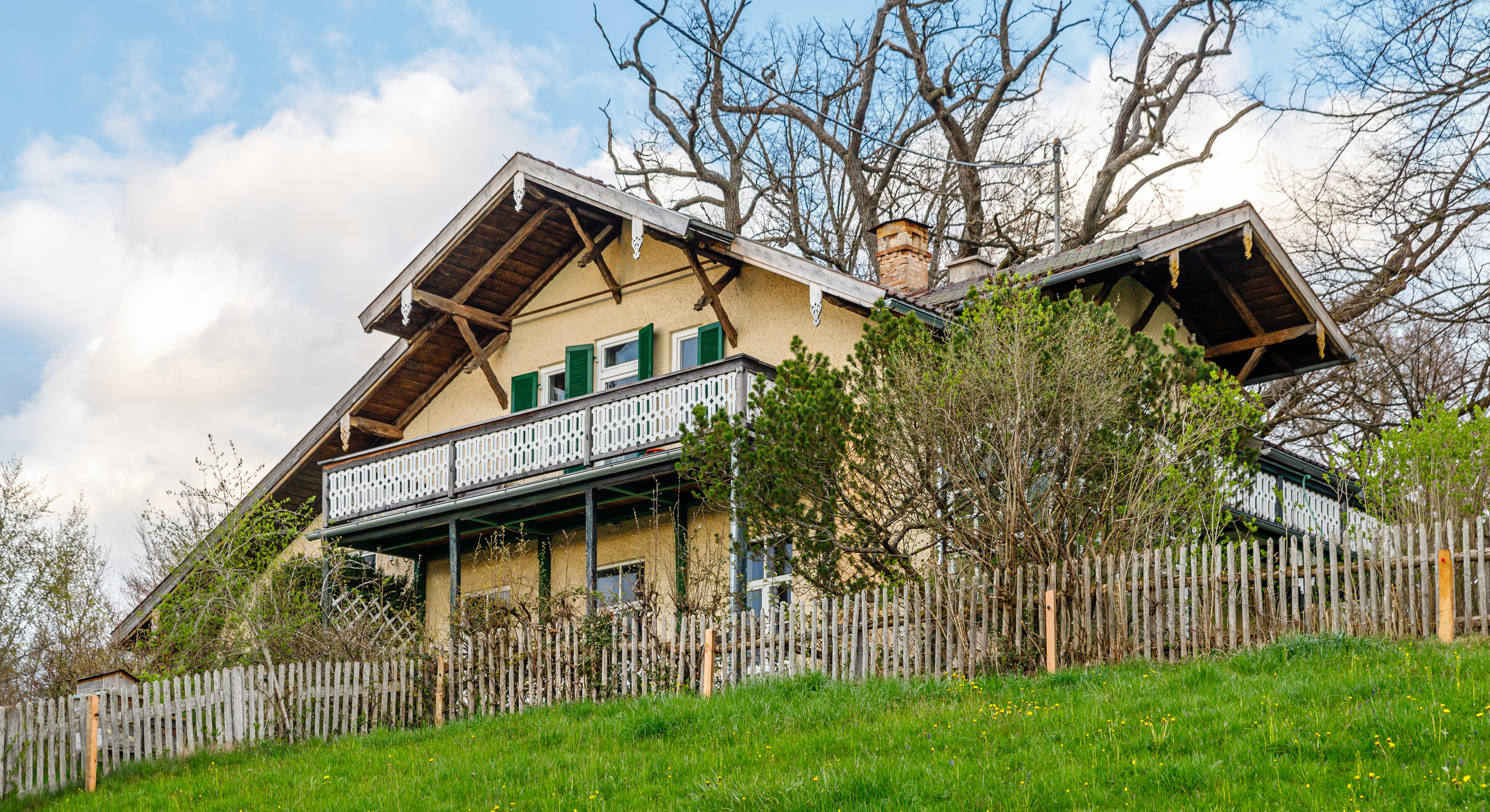
Max Villa, Ambach

In Münsing on Lake Starnberg there are two artist villas of Gabriel von Max. He bought Villa Max (Ammerland) in 1875 in the district of Ammerland and lived there with his family in the summer months until his divorce in 1890 (although he had a mistress in Ambach since the mid-1880s). He acquired the second Villa Max (Ambach) in Ambach in 1893 after marrying Ernestine Harlander, his second wife. He had the house remodeled into an artist's villa. He spent the summer months there until about 1900, after which he lived there most of the time until his death in 1915. Both buildings are listed as historic monuments.

== Collections ==
The largest collection of the work of Gabriel von Max in the United States is held by the Jack Daulton Collection in Los Altos Hills, California. Also, Gabriel von Max's work can be found in the collection of Milan Jovanović Stojimirović who bequeathed his vast collection of paintings and artifacts to the Art Department of the Museum in Smederevo.

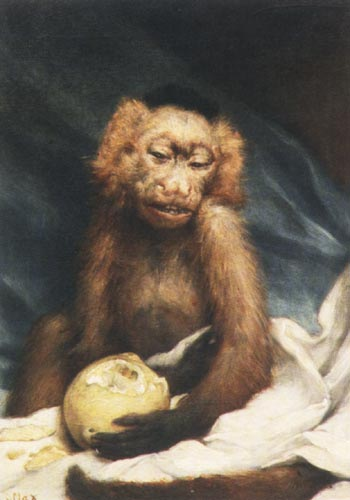
Gabriel von Max: Äffchen mit Zitrone; Sauere Erfahrungen (Monkey with Lemon; Bitter Experiences), The Jack Daulton Collection, Los Altos Hills, California

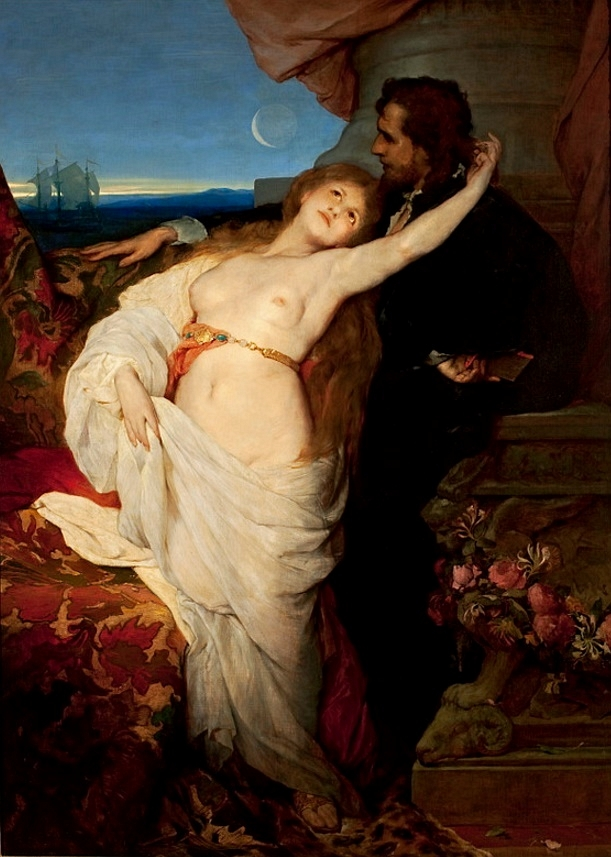
Tannhäuser (c. 1878), National Museum, Warsaw

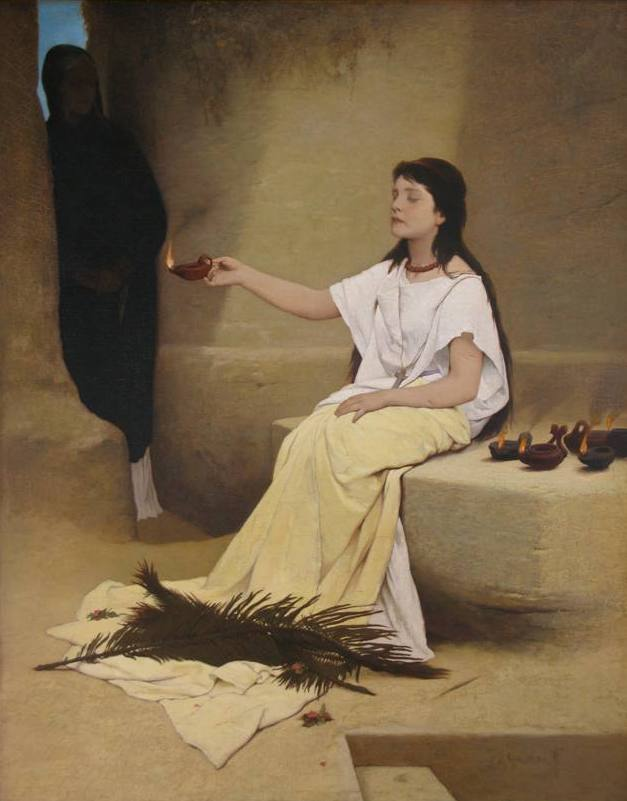
Light

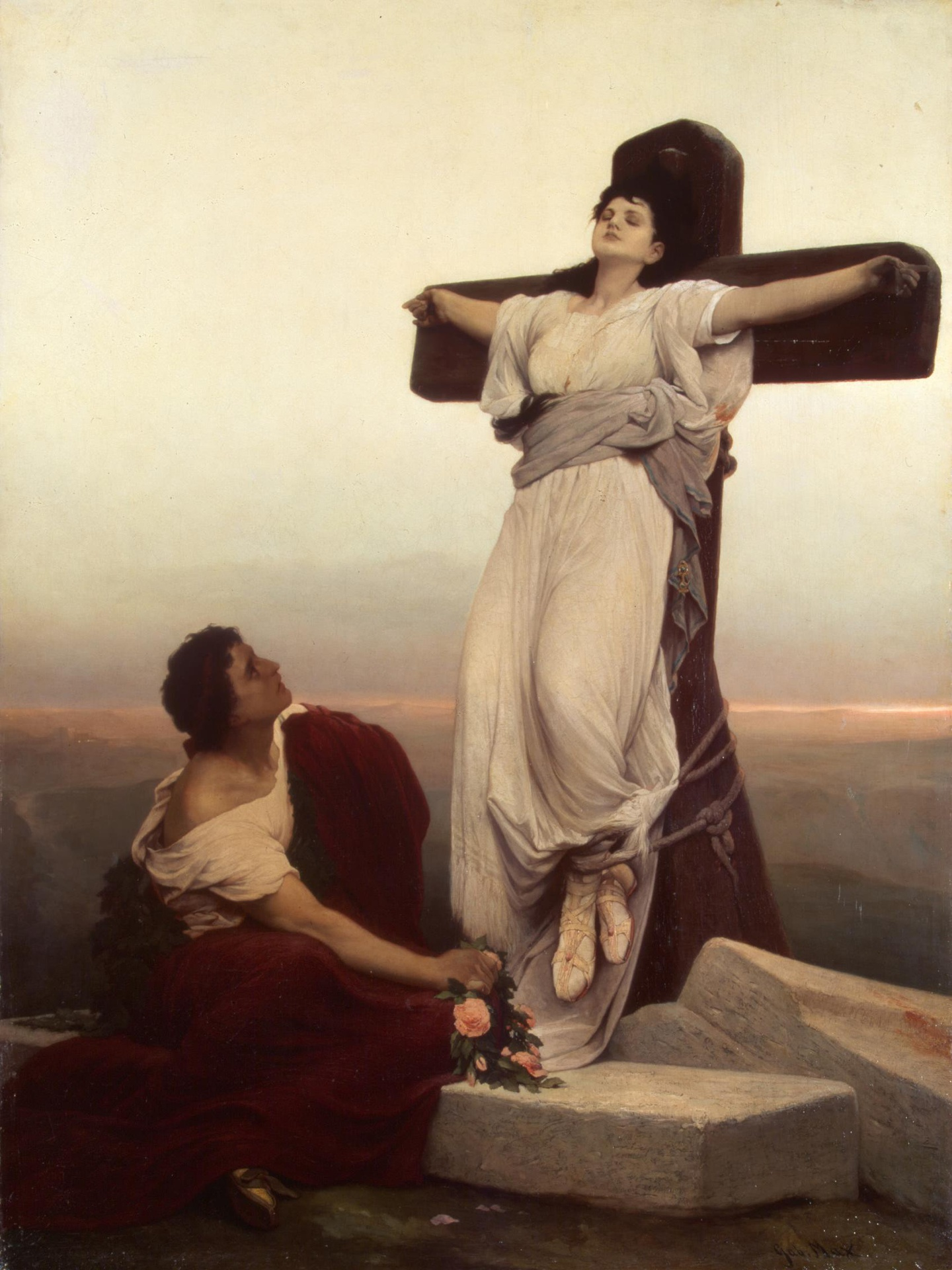
Martyress

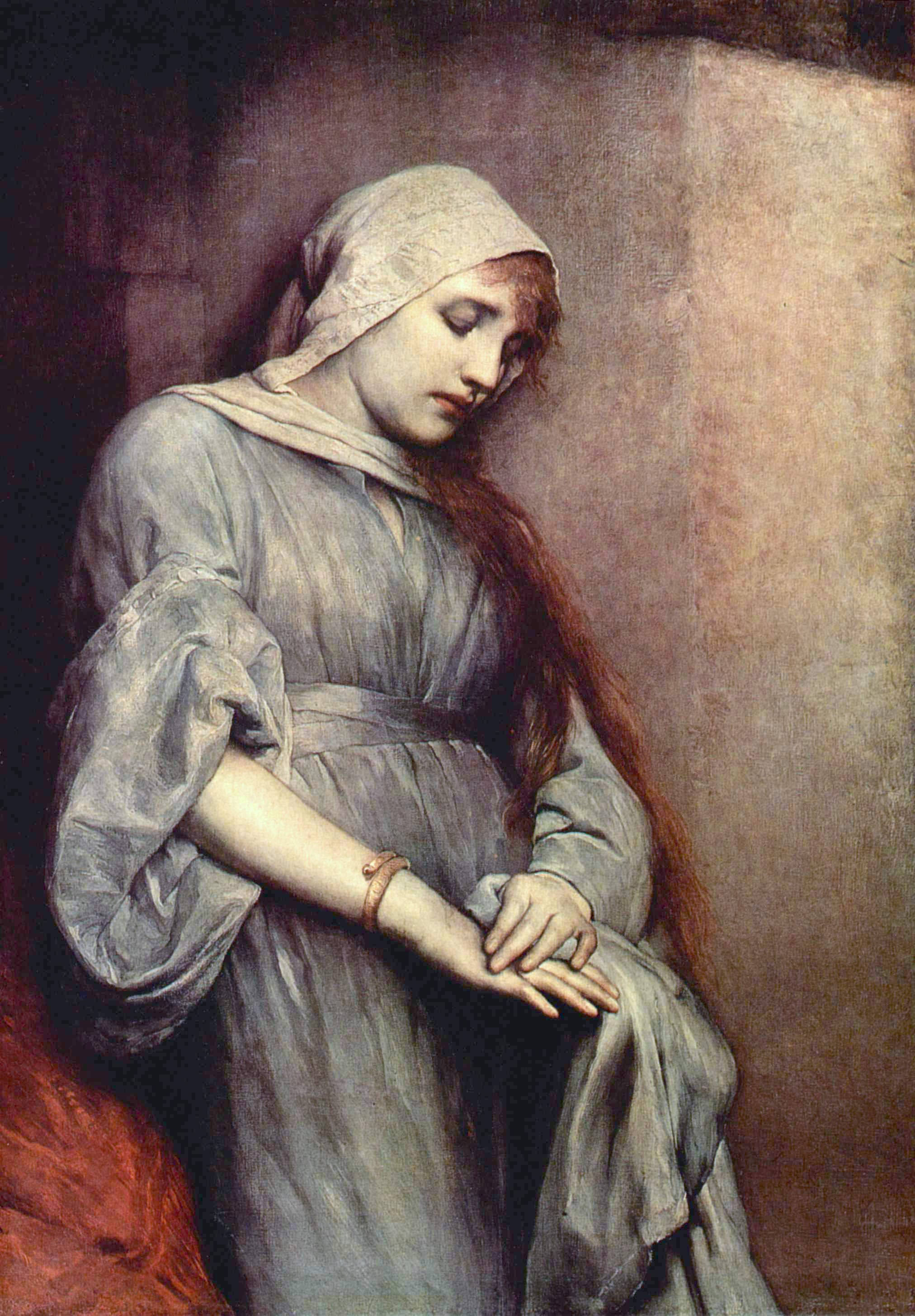
Lady Macbeth

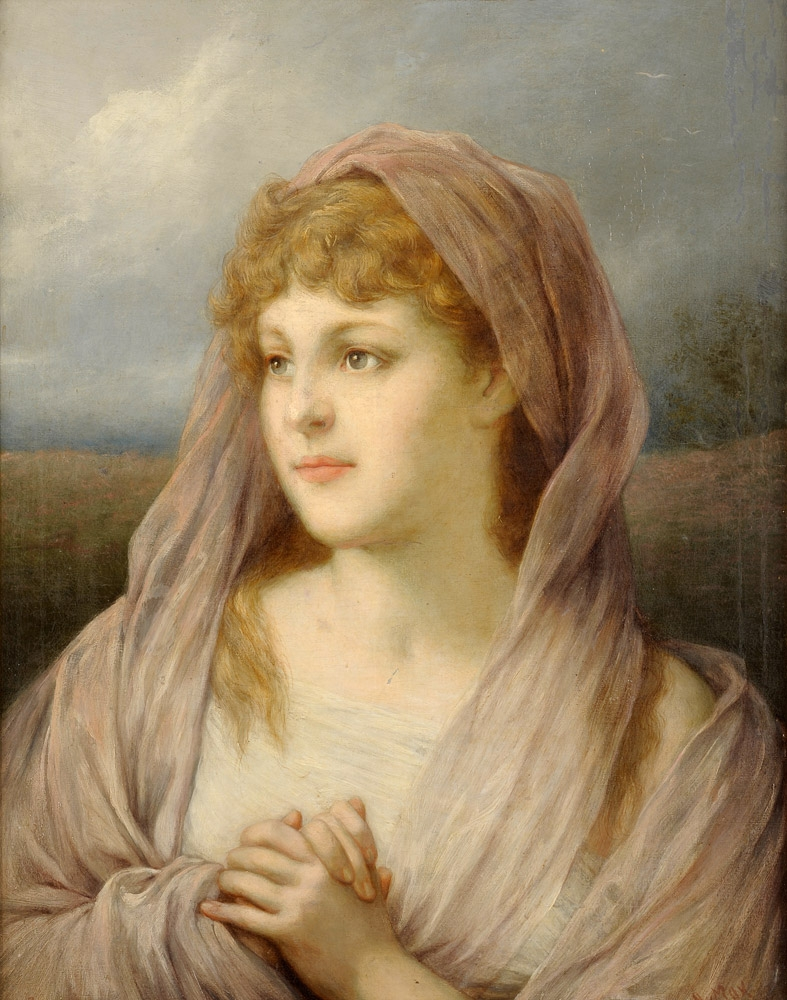
Blonde Frau mit Seidenschleier - Blonde young girl wiyth a veil.

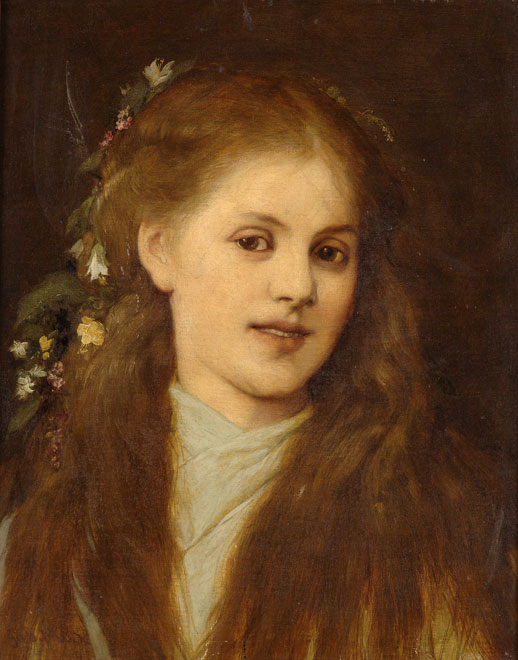
Young woman with flowers in her hair

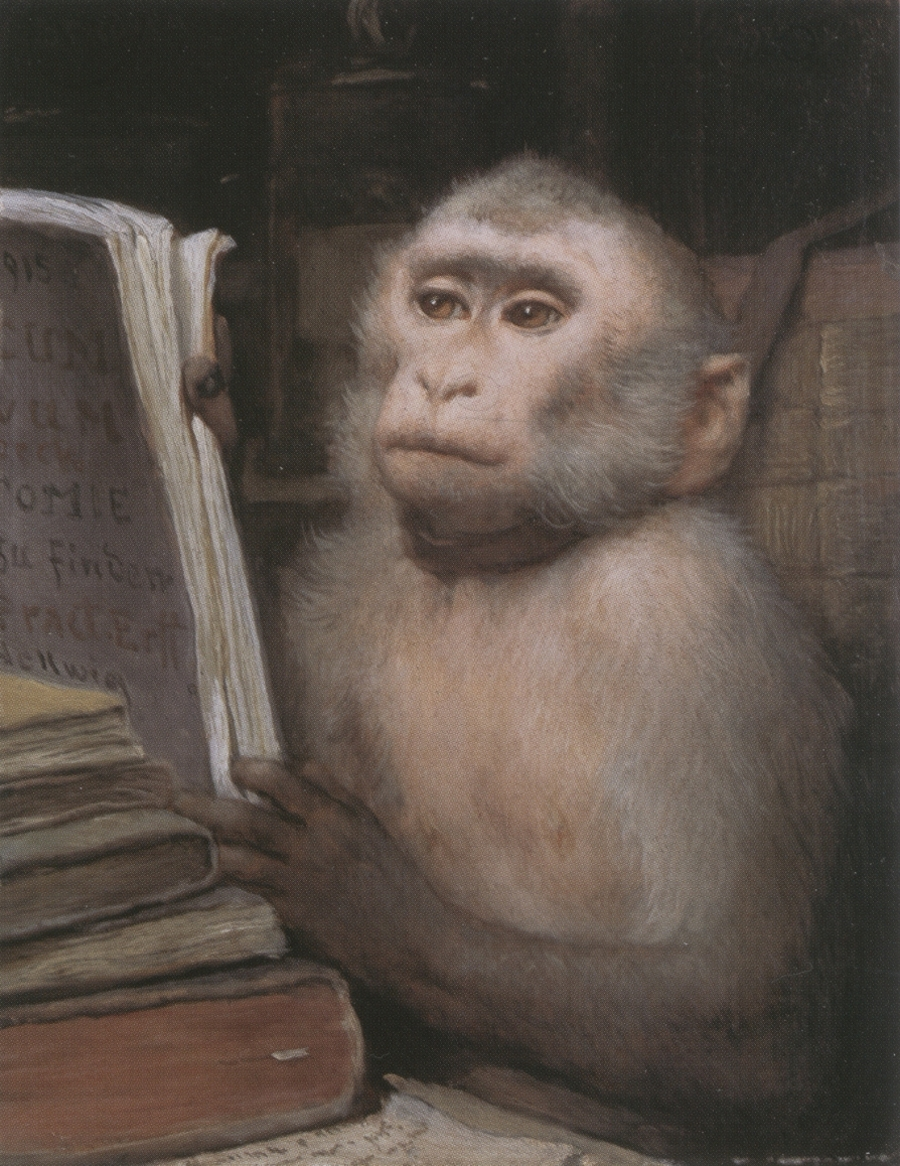
The reading ape

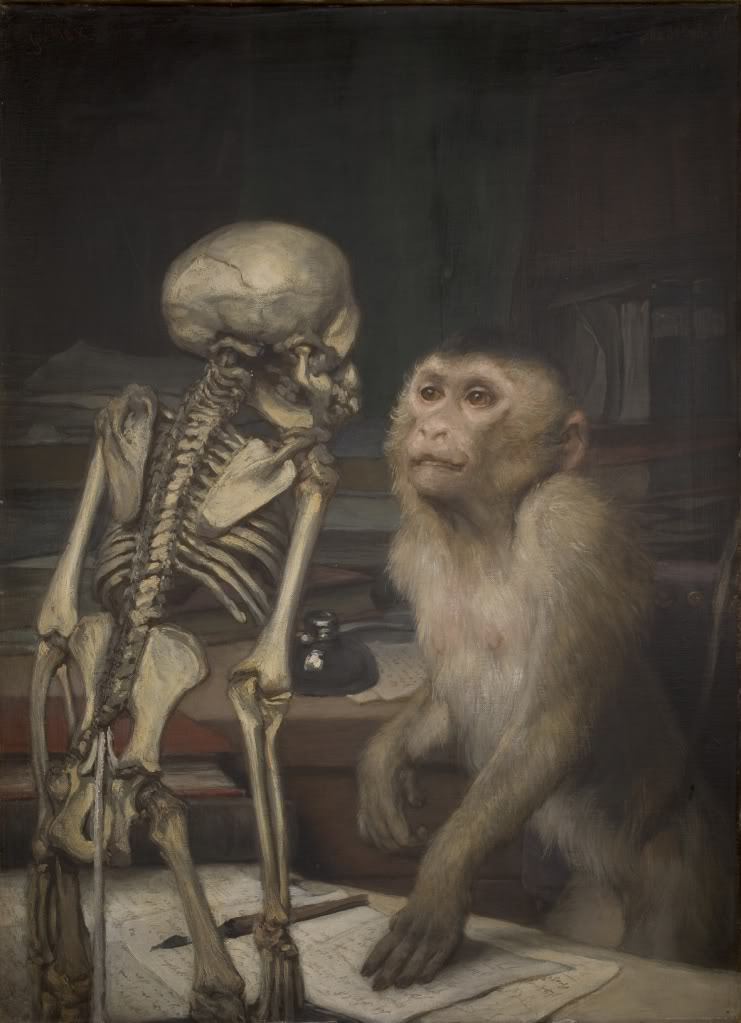
Monkey Before Skeleton

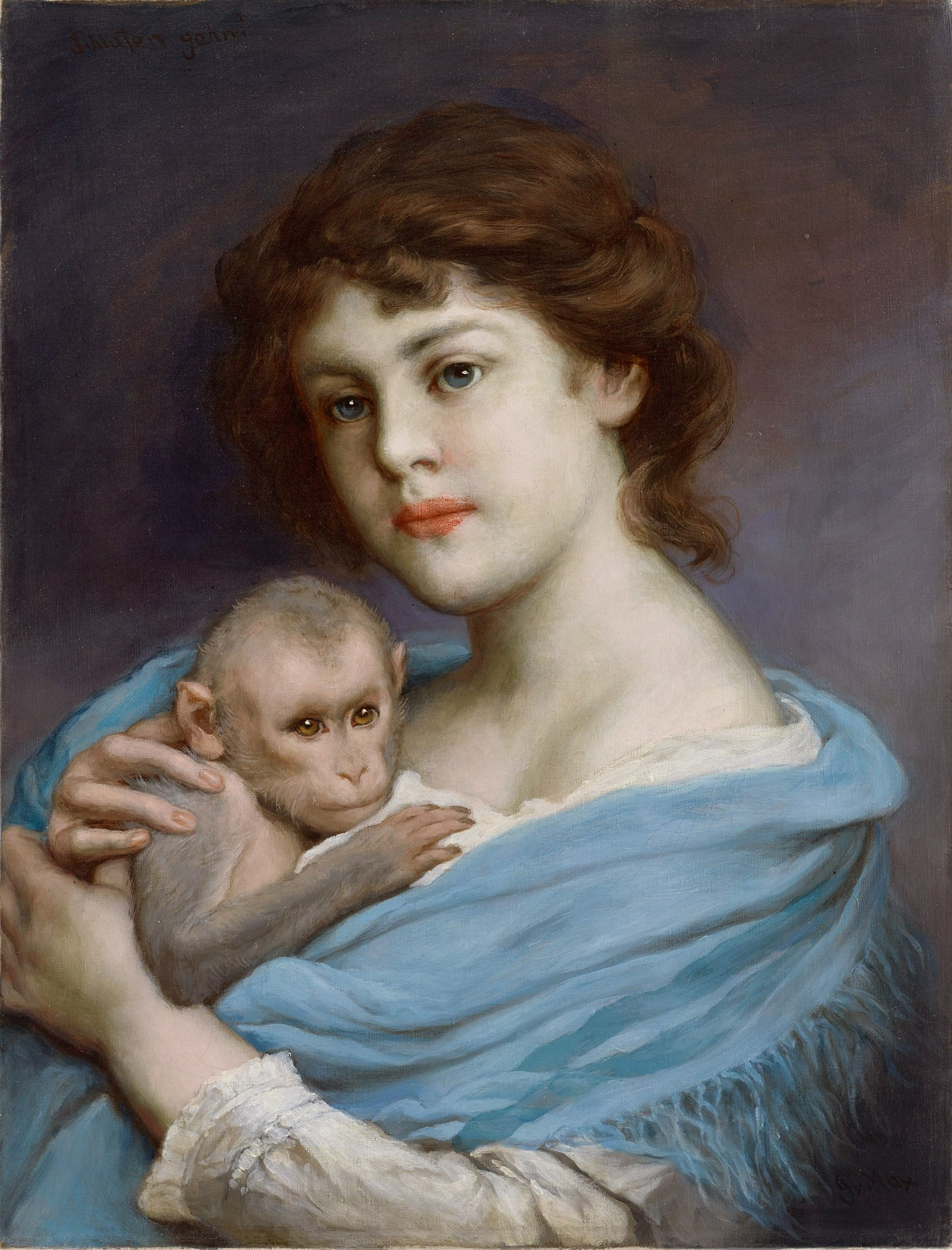
Going to Sleepǃ

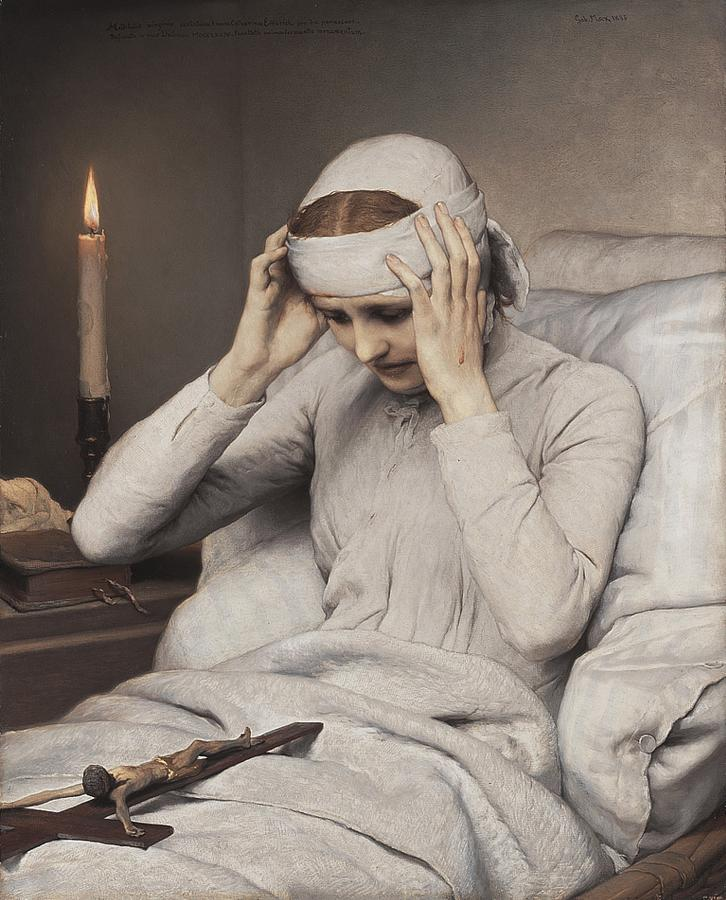
The ecstatic virgin Katharina Emmerich

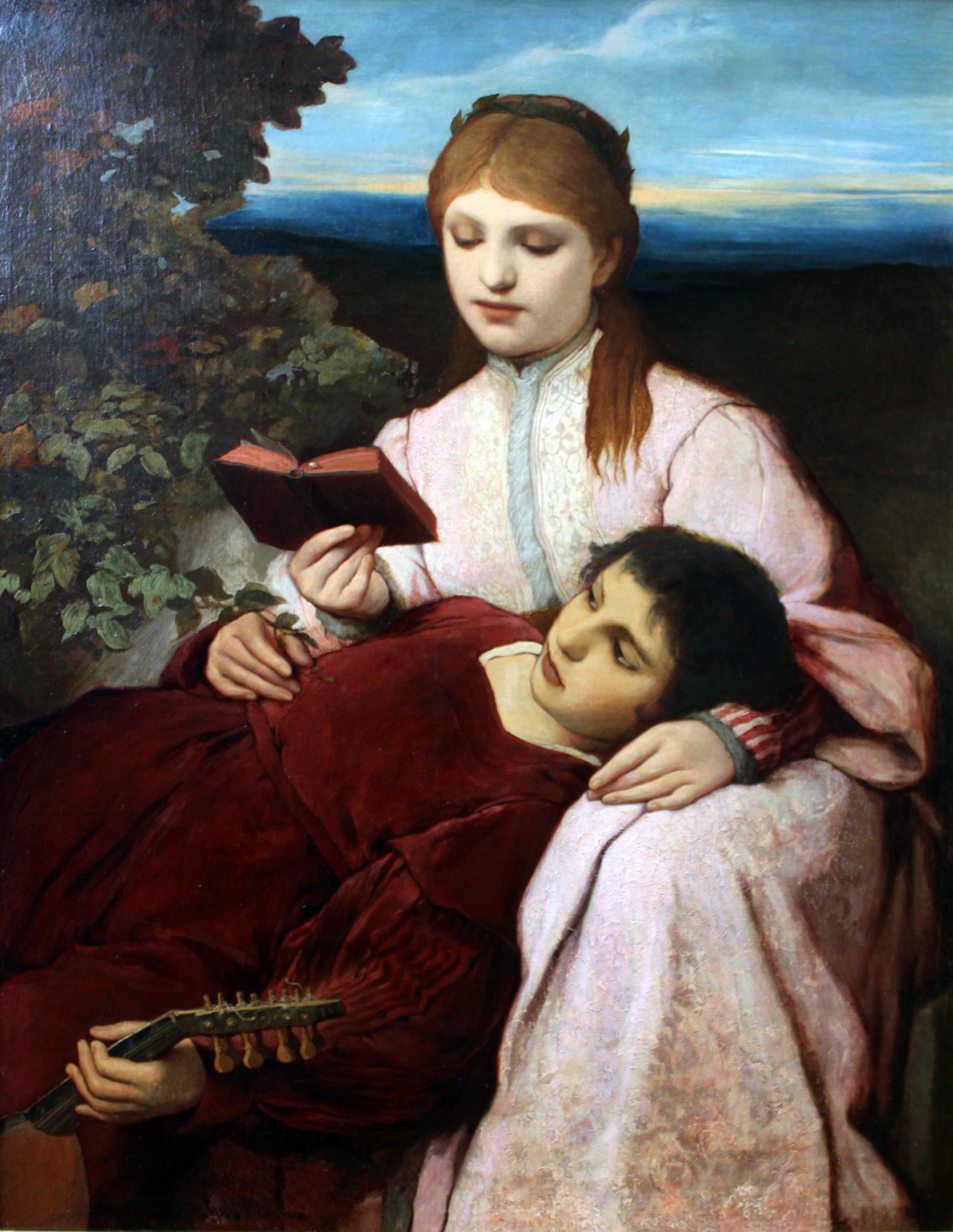
The leisure hour anagoria

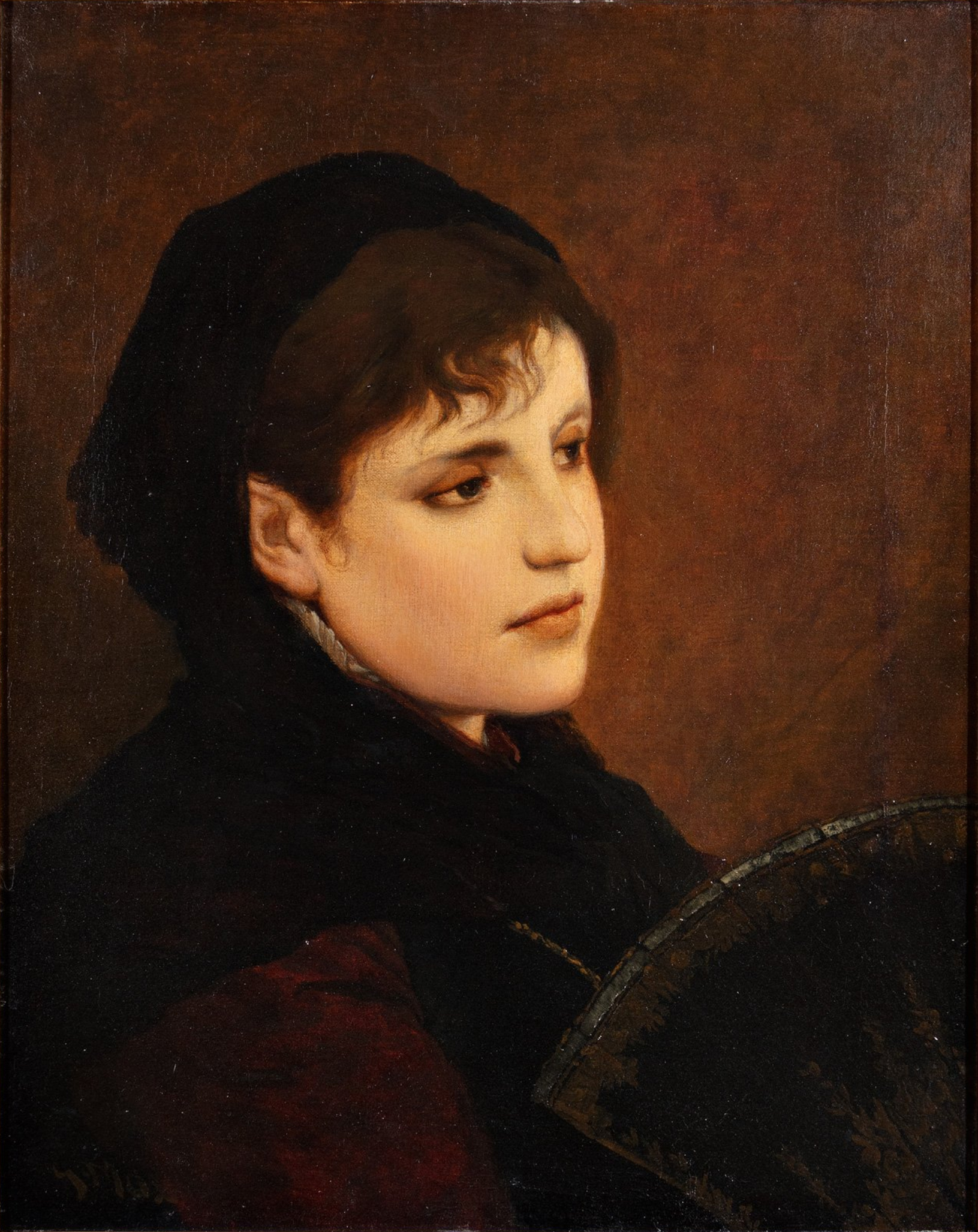
Young Spaniard with a fan (probably 1880s)

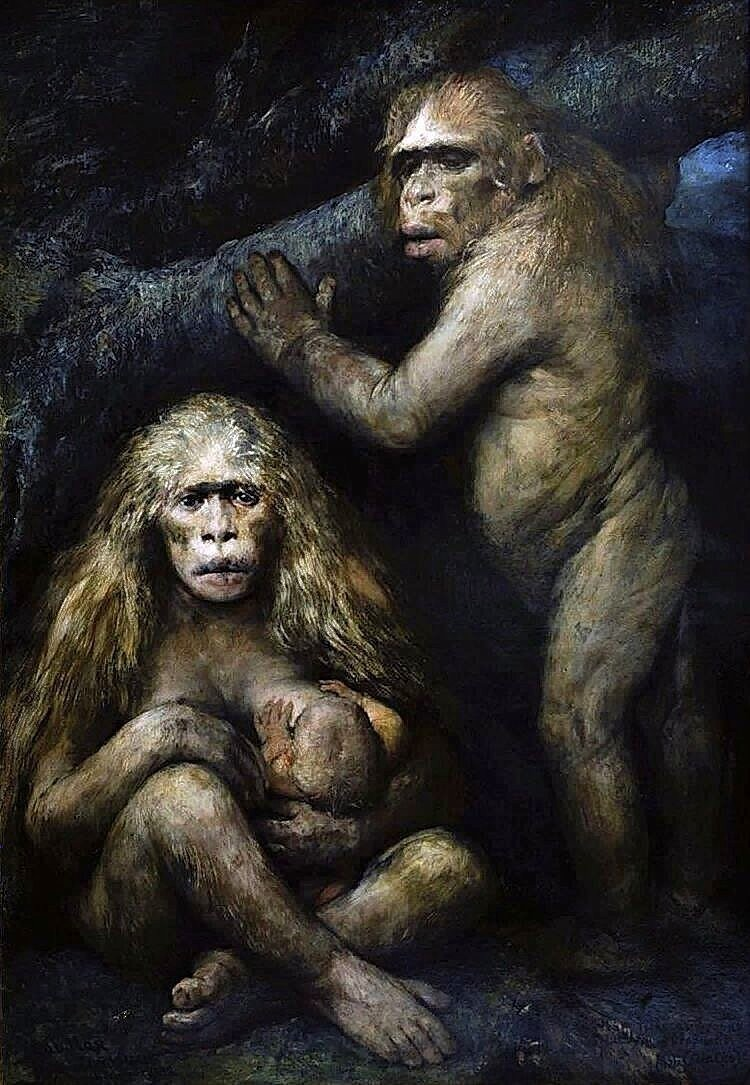
Pithecanthropus europaeus (Alalus) (1894)

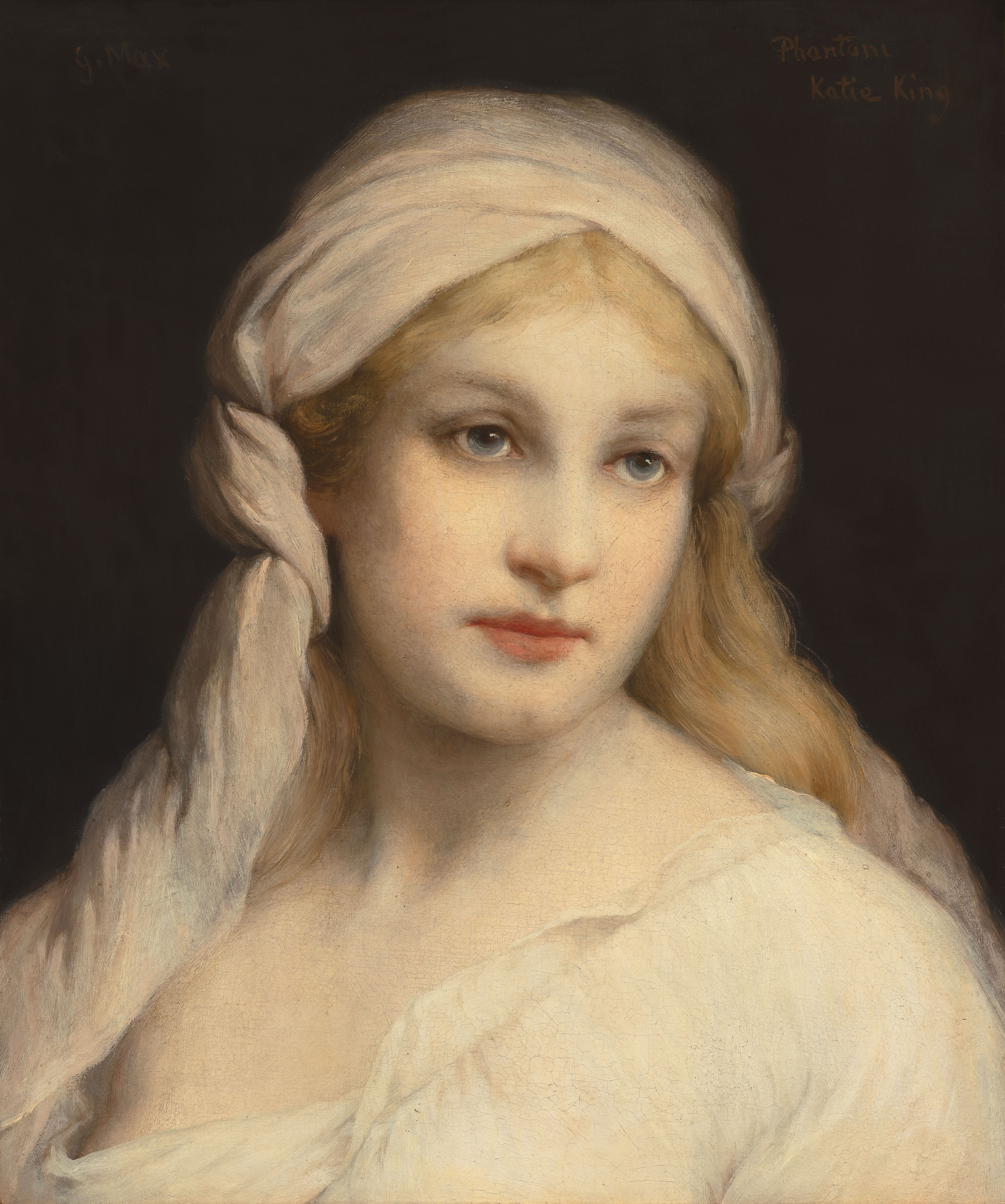
Gabriel von Max: ‘’The Phantom Katie King”, The Jack Daulton Collection, Los Altos Hills, California

== Sources ==
- Klemt, Agathon: Gabriel Max und seine Werke, Gesellschaft für moderne Kunst, Wien 1886
- Nicolaus Mann: Gabriel Max, eine kulturhistorische Skizze, Weber, Leipzig 1890
- Franz H. Meißner: Gabriel von Max, Hanfstaengl, München 1899
- Johannes Muggenthaler (Hrsg.): Der Geister Bahnen. Eine Ausstellung zu Ehren von Gabriel von Max, 1849-1915, Mosel & Tschechow, München 1988, ISBN 3-925987-03-7
- Harald Siebenhaar: Gabriel von Max und die Moderne, in: Klaus G. Beuckers (Hrsg.): Festschrift für Johanne Langner, Lit Verlag, Münster 1997, ISBN 3-8258-3209-0
- Thieme-Becker, Bd.XXIV, pp. 288/289.
- Adolf Rosenberg, The Munich School of Painters and their development since 1871, Hanover 1887, pp. 15–18.
- Fritz von Ostini, Nachruf auf Gabriel von Max in: Muncher Neueste Nachrichten, 1915.
- Cat. Neue Pinakothek, Munich. Bd. VI, Painters of the Grunderzeit, Editor Horst Ludwig. Munich 1977, pp. 238–243.
- Ausst, Cat. Neue Pinakothek, Munich. The Munich School 1850-1914, Munich 1979, pp. 304–307.
- Klaus Popitz, The Fruhe Poster in Europe and the USA, Vol.3, Germany.
- Jo-Anne Birnie Danzker (Ed.): Gabriel von Max, Frye Art Museum, Seattle 2011, ISBN 978-0-295-99146-7
