= Gabriel Churchkitten =

1942 book by Margot Austin

- Author: Margot Austin
- Publication date: 1942
- OCLC: 1511702

Gabriel Churchkitten is a children's book written in 1942 by Margot Austin and published that same year by Dutton. It is the second in a series of four books about a mouse, a cat and a dog that live in the church of Parson Peaseporrige. The parson is a bit absent-minded and in this book he sleepwalks. When he does, he eats the cheese, milk and bone he has set out for the animals. To make matters worse he also plays the organ in his sleep. To find a solution Gabriel puts on his thinking cap. He once heard the parson say, "A little bird told me...." So Gabriel's ties a glass bird in a nest on his head as a thinking cap.

== Reception ==
The New York Times felt this book did not live up to the impossibly high standard set by Peter Churchmouse. However, the plot is more complex and more suitable for school-age children. However, the Times-Standard of New Bedford, Massachusetts held the opposite view, claiming that the story surpassed its predecessor in plot and illustration, and stated that even the youngest children would be interested. Kirkus reviews also expressed a positive opinion, calling the book "delicious."

In 1944, the story was adapted to an animated short film of the same name by Famous Studios as part of their Noveltoons series.
