= Gabriella =

Gabriella may refer to:

- Gabriella (given name), a feminine given name
- Gabriella di Vergy, an opera seria by Gaetano Donizetti (1826, revised 1838), and an opera by Mercadante (1828), based on the tragedy Gabrielle de Vergy by Dormont De Belloy (1777)
- 355 Gabriella is a Main belt asteroid named for Gabrielle Renaudot Flammarion
- MS Gabriella is a cruiseferry previously known as the M/S Frans Suell
- Gabriella is a variety of tulip.
- Gabriella, an extinct genus of crab from the Jurassic of Austria

== See also ==
- Gabriela (disambiguation)
