= Gabriela =

Gabriela may refer to:

- Gabriela (given name), a feminine given name
- Gabriela (1942 film), a Czech film
- Gabriela (1950 film), a German film
- Gabriela (1983 film), a Brazilian film
- Gabriela (2001 film), an American film
- Gabriela (1960 TV series), a Mexican telenovela
- Gabriela (1964 TV series), a Mexican telenovela
- Gabriela (1975 TV series), a 1975 Brazilian telenovela
- Gabriela (2012 TV series), a 2012 Brazilian telenovela
- Gabriela Women's Party, a feminist Filipino political alliance
- "Gabriela" (song), a 2025 song by Katseye

== See also ==
- Gabriella (disambiguation)
