= Gabriel Hernández =

Gabriel Hernández may refer to:

- Gabriel Hernández (athlete) (born 1949), Mexican Olympic athlete
- Gabriel Hernández (boxer) (1973–2001), Dominican Republic boxer
- Gabriel Hernández (footballer) (born 1944), Colombian footballer
- Gabriel Hernández (singer), singer, member of the band No Mercy
- Gabriel Hernández (water polo) (born 1975), Spanish water polo player and coach
