= Gabriel Costenaro =

Brazilian politician (born 1993)

- Costenaro in 2024

Member of the Legislative Assembly of Rio de Janeiro
- Incumbent
- Assumed office 1 February 2027

Personal details
- Born: 23 March 1993 (age 33)
- Party: New Party

Gabriel Costenaro de Sousa (born 23 March 1993) is a Brazilian politician who was elected member of the Legislative Assembly of Rio de Janeiro in 2026. In the 2024 Rio de Janeiro municipal election, he was elected as the first alternate municipal councillor of the New Party.
