= Montt =

Montt may refer to:

== Given name ==
- Montt Mardié (born 1983), Swedish singer, songwriter, multi-instrumentalist and composer

== Surname ==
- Alberto Montt, modern Chilean comic designer
- Ambrosio Montt Luco (1830–1899), Chilean politician and lawyer
- Andrés Wood Montt (born 1965), Chilean film director, producer and writer
- Cristina Montt (1895–1969), Chilean film star of silent and early sound films
- Efraín Ríos Montt (1926–2018), former de facto President of Guatemala, dictator, army general
- Jorge Montt (1845–1922), vice admiral of the Chilean Navy, president of Chile from 1891 to 1896
- José Anacleto Montt Goyenechea (1802–1867), Chilean politician and lawyer
- Manuel Montt (1809–1880), Chilean statesman and scholar
- Mario Enrique Ríos Montt (1932–2026), Guatemalan prelate of the Roman Catholic Church, human rights activist
- Montt family of Chile became politically influential during the 19th century; it is still important
- Nicolasa Montt (1857–1924), Chilean poet, writer, translator
- Pedro Montt (1849–1910), Chilean political figure
- Rosario Montt (1820s – 1894), First Lady of Chile from 1851 to 1861
- Teresa Wilms Montt (1893–1921), Chilean writer, poet and anarcho-feminist
- Zury Ríos Montt (born 1968), Guatemalan politician with the Guatemalan Republican Front (FRG) political party

== Places ==
- Jorge Montt Glacier, tidewater glacier in the Aisén Region of Chile
- Jorge Montt Island, in the Patagonian Archipelago in Magallanes y la Antártica Chilena Region, Chile
- Manuel Montt metro station, on the Line 1 of the Santiago Metro, in Santiago, Chile
- Puerto Montt, port city and commune in southern Chile

== See also ==
- Mont (disambiguation)
- Mott (disambiguation)
