= Liberal–Conservative Fusion =

Political alliance within Chile from 1858 to 1873

The Liberal–Conservative Fusion (Spanish: Fusión Liberal-Conservadora) was an oligarchic alliance between Chilean liberal (Pipiolos) and conservative (Pelucones) political parties that existed from 1858 to 1874.

The two groups were united in their opposition to the political choices of the time. Liberals represented the laity (non-clergy) and were in favor of more political liberties and firmer boundaries on presidential powers granted by the Constitution of 1833. Conservatives started off with the clergy's influence: they had the Church, with an independent function with respect to patronage, and had firm support from the president. Their coalition united opposition to the authoritarian practices of the government of Manuel Montt and its minister of the Interior, Antonio Varas. They were structured to display a united front before the electoral intervention of the National Party also known as the Montt-Varista Party.

== Liberal Alliance ==
Not all liberals accepted the fusion. The future radicals separated in 1859 with a party consisting of more laity, an anti-clergy program, and the separation of the church and state. They arrived in the political arena with the election of Jose Joaquin Perez (1861–1871) who displaced the Montt-Varistas. The presidency of Federico Errázuriz Zañartu garnered the rest of the conservatives (1873) because of his religious subject. As result, a new coalition was formed which integrated liberal and radical elements. This was called the Liberal Alliance, which gave the new legislative core to the government of Errázuriz Zañartu in 1875.
