= Goyenechea =

Goyenechea is a surname. Notable people with the surname include:

- Carmelo Goyenechea (1898-1984), Spanish footballer
- Filomena Valenzuela Goyenechea (c. 1848–1924), Chilean soldier
- Isidora Goyenechea (1836-1897), Chilean industrialist
- José Anacleto Montt Goyenechea (1802–1867), Chilean politician and lawyer
- Manuel Antonio Matta Goyenechea (1826–1892), Chilean politician, lawyer, and writer
- Pedro León Gallo Goyenechea (1830–1877), Chilean politician
- Rosalía Mera Goyenechea (1944–2013), Spanish businesswoman and fashion designer
- Rosario Montt Goyenechea (1820s–1894), Chilean First Lady
