= Montt family =

Chilean family of Catalan descent

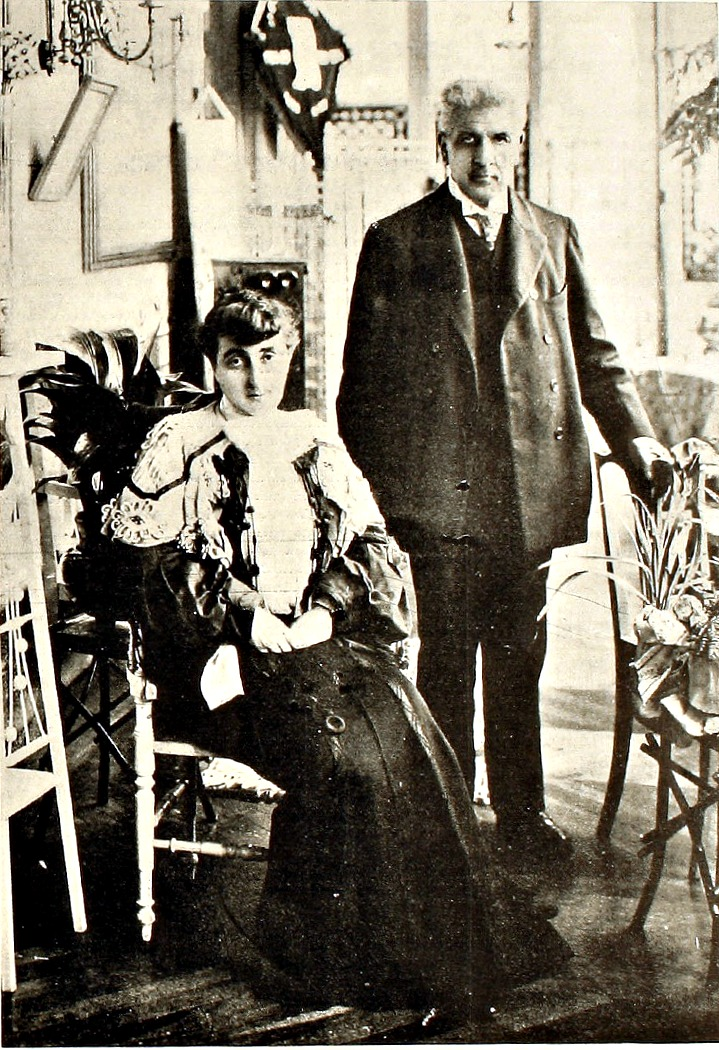
Sara del Campo with her husband President Pedro Montt in 1906

The Montt family is a Chilean political family of Catalan descent, active during the mid-eighteenth to the late-twentieth century.

== Members ==
- José Esteban de Montt Cabrera (1709–1782), military officer and founder of the Montt family in Chile; married Mariana Prado de Rojas (1714– 1798)
- José Santiago Montt Irarrázaval (1797–1843), lawyer and politician; married María del Rosario Albano i Vergara
- José Anacleto Montt Goyenechea (1802–1867): lawyer and politician
- Manuel Montt (1809–1880): politician and President of Chile
- Rosario Montt (1827–1894): First Lady of Chile
- Ambrosio Montt Luco (1830–1899): politician and lawyer
- Julio Montt Salamanca (1861–1882): soldier and hero of the War of the Pacific
- Pedro Montt (1849–1910): politician and President of Chile
- Jorge Montt (1845–1922): admiral, politician and President of Chile
- Leonor Frederick de Montt: First Lady of Chile
- Luis Montt Montt (1848–1909): lawyer, deputy, writer, historiographer, son of Manuel Montt Torres, and brother of Pedro Montt Montt
- Sara del Campo de Montt (1855–1942), First Lady of Chile
- Nicolasa Montt (1857-1924): poet
- Teresa Wilms Montt (1893–1921): poet
- Cristina Montt (1895–1969): early film actress
- Manuel Montt Lehuedé (1904–1983): politician and representative for Itata and San Carlos provinces
- Manuel Montt Balmaceda (born 1925): lawyer, former diplomat to the ILO and founder rector of the Diego Portales University
- Luis Montt Dubournais (born 1948): politician and mayor of La Reina (Santiago)
- Marta Montt Balmaceda (1934–2019): ballerina and model
- Raúl Celis Montt (born 1962), lawyer and politician
- Andrés Wood Montt (born 1965): film director
- Andrés Celis Montt (born 1975), lawyer and politician
- Cristo Montt (born 1981) art director and actor

== See also ==
- History of Chile
- Puerto Montt
