= Le Mont =

Le Mont may refer to:

== Places ==
France

- Le Mont, Vosges, in the Vosges department
- Le Mont, Jura department, now integrated into Dramelay
- Le Mont, hamlet in the commune Sixt-Fer-à-Cheval
- Le Mont-Dieu, in the Ardennes department
- Le Mont-Saint-Adrien, in the Oise department
- Le Mont-Saint-Michel, in the Manche department
- Le Mont-Dore (France), Puy-de-Dôme
- Le Mont-Mesly, quarter of Créteil

Switzerland

- Le Mont-sur-Lausanne, in the canton of Vaud
  - FC Le Mont Swiss football club based in Le Mont-sur-Lausanne

== See also ==
- Mont (disambiguation)
