= Mont. =

Mont. may refer to:

- Camille Montagne, French botanist, mycologist and military physician
- Montana, a U.S. state

== See also ==
- Mont (disambiguation)
- Montenegro, a country in Southeastern Europe
