= Mont =

Mont may refer to:

== Places ==
- Mont., an abbreviation for Montana, a U.S. state
- Mont, Belgium (disambiguation), several places in Belgium
- Mont, Hautes-Pyrénées, a commune in France
- Mont, Pyrénées-Atlantiques, a commune in France
- Mont, Saône-et-Loire, a commune in France

== Other uses ==
- Mont (food), a category of Burmese snacks and desserts
- Mont (surname)
- Mont., botanical author abbreviation of Camille Montagne (1784-1866), French military physician and botanist
- Seawise Giant, the largest ship in the world, later renamed MV Mont for her final journey
- Menthu or Mont, a deity in Egyptian mythology
- M.O.N.T, South Korean boy group
- Metal-organic nanotubes, a class of polymers

== See also ==
- Le Mont (disambiguation)
- Monte (disambiguation)
- Monts (disambiguation)
- Montt (disambiguation)
