= Tannay =

Tannay may refer to:

- Tannay, Switzerland, a municipality in the canton of Vaud, Switzerland
- Tannay, Ardennes, a former commune in the Ardennes department, France
- Tannay, Nièvre, a commune in the Nièvre department, France

== See also ==
- Tanay (disambiguation)
