= Nicolasa Montt =

Chilean writer (1857–1924)

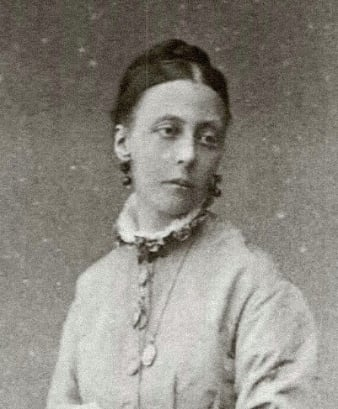
- Born: Nicolassa Montt Barros; 1857 Freirina, Chile
- Died: 1924 (aged 66–67)
- Occupation: poet; translator
- Spouse: Nicolás Marambio
- Children: 7
- Relatives: Montt family

Nicolasa Montt (née, Nicolasa Montt Barros; after marriage, Nicolasa Montt de Marambio; Freirina, 1857–1924) was a Chilean poet who published in regional newspapers and books. She also translated from French works by well-known French writers. Along with the Atacama writer Mercedes Marín del Solar and the Copapina Rosario Orrego, Montt is considered one of the pioneers in the field of women's poetry and writing in Chile.

== Biography ==
Hailing from the Montt family, her parents were José Antonio Montt and Beatriz Barros.

She married Nicolás Marambio with whom she had seven children, among them, the lawyer Nicolás Marambio Montt (1886–1936), who became a deputy and senator of Chile.

Montt made his debut in literature probably between 1891 and 1901, a period in which texts by Mercedes Belzú de Dorado, Rosa Araneda, Victoria Sainte-Marie, Sara María García de Arias, Graciela Sotomayor, Laura Bustos, and Cristina Otaegui, among others, were published. Her work was characterized by the use of a personal language mainly due to the "absence of women from the cultural space due to the prevailing patriarchalism and the conservatism of Chilean political and social institutions" present at the end of the 19th century and beginning of the 20th.

She wrote for several journalistic media. As a translator, she dealt mainly with French texts by Enrique Conscience and Nanine Sauvestre, among others.

== Selected works ==
- 1897 – Rejina: poema dedicado a su hija Julia Elisa en el día de su cumple-años: agosto 24 de 1894
- 1902 – Carlota i Luisita o las dos hermanas : poema, dedicado a su querida hijita Berta Carmela
- 1906 – Páginas íntimas
