= Manuel Vial Formas =

Chilean political figure and conservative politician

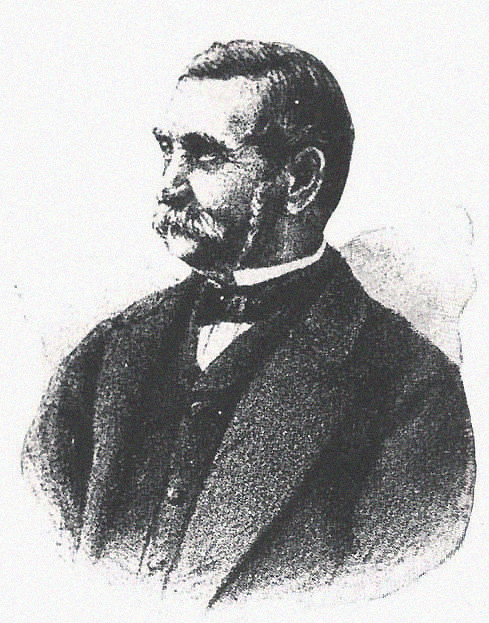

Minister of the Interior and Foreign Affairs
- In office 1846–1849
- President: Manuel Bulnes
- Preceded by: Manuel Montt
- Succeeded by: José Joaquín Pérez

Minister of Finance
- In office 1846–1848
- President: Manuel Bulnes
- Preceded by: José Joaquín Pérez
- Succeeded by: Salvador Sanfuentes

Member of the Chamber of Deputies
- In office 1 June 1843 – 31 May 1846
- Constituency: Cauquenes Province
- In office 1 June 1834 – 31 May 1840
- Constituency: San Carlos
- In office 1 June 1831 – 11 March 1834
- Constituency: Casablanca

Personal details
- Born: 20 March 1804 Valparaíso, Chile
- Died: 20 February 1882 (aged 77) Valparaíso, Chile

Manuel Camilo Agustín Vial Formas (March 20, 1804 – February 20, 1882) was a Chilean political figure and conservative politician. He served several times as minister.

== Biography ==
Vial was born on March 20, 1804, in Valparaíso. He was the son of Agustín Vial Santelices and of María del Rosario de Formas y Patiño Sánchez de Morales.

After completing his studies, he graduated as a lawyer on July 30, 1835. He married Luisa Carrera Fontecilla and together had one son, Agustín. After her death he married Rafaela de la Lastra Valdivieso, with whom he had eight children.

== Political career ==
He became the secretary of the "Congreso de Plenipotenciarios" on September 14, 1830; replacing José Miguel Varas Vallejos. As a leader of the Conservative party, he was elected deputy for Casablanca in 1831. He became Secretary of the chamber and member of the permanent committee on government and foreign affairs as well as the one on legislative affairs and justice. He was reelected, this time for San Carlos, on 1834, and again for Cauquenes in 1843.

Vial was elected a Senator from 1846 to 1855; and then again from 1864 to his death in 1882. President Manuel Bulnes named him Minister of the Interior and Foreign Affairs on September 18, 1846; of Finance, on September 2, 1848; of Justice, Cult and Public Education, on 1849. He was also plenipotentiary minister to Peru in 1846. He was also a State Councillor and Supreme Court fiscal. He died in Valparaiso, at the age of 78.
