= Fifty Fathoms Deep (1931 film) =

1931 film

- Directed by: Roy William Neill
- Screenplay by: Dorothy Howell
- Starring: Christina Montt; Richard Cromwell; Mary Doran; Jack Holt
- Cinematography: Joseph Walker
- Edited by: Gene Havlick
- Production company: Columbia Pictures
- Distributed by: Columbia Pictures
- Release date: August 20, 1931
- Running time: 70 minutes
- Country: United States
- Language: English

Fifty Fathoms Deep is a 1931 American pre-Code adventure film directed by Roy William Neill starring Jack Holt, Mary Doran and Richard Cromwell. It was produced and distributed by Columbia Pictures.

== Plot ==
A woman creates a great rift between old friends: an experienced older diver, and his younger protege. They become enemies when a gold-digger marries the latter. She soon leaves him in favor of a wealthy yachtsman. She is aboard his boat when an accident occurs. The two divers must salvage the costly boat before it sinks.

== Cast ==
- Jack Holt as Tim Burke
- Mary Doran as Florine
- Richard Cromwell as 'Pinky' Caldwell
- Loretta Sayers as Myra
- Wallace MacDonald as Yacht First Mate
- Christina Montt as Conchita
- Henry Mowbray as Yacht Owsner
