= Tanay =

Tanay may refer to:

== People ==
=== Given name ===
- Tanay Chheda (born 1996), Indian actor
- Tanay Gajjar (born 1973), Indian sound-recording engineer
- Tanay Chowdhury (born 1981), Indian Data Scientist
- Tanay Malhara, 2016 winner of Indian TV series Dance Plus

=== Surname ===
- Emanuel Tanay (1928– 2014), American physician and Holocaust survivor
- Bella Tanay, star of the 1979 Hungarian film The Fortress

== Places ==
- Tanay, Côte-d'Or, a commune in Dijon, Côte-d'Or, France
- Tanay, Rizal, a municipality in the Philippines
- Lac de Tanay, a lake in Valais, Switzerland
- Tanay Nature Park, in Izmir, Turkey

== See also ==
- Tannay (disambiguation)
