= Jorge Montt Island =

Island in Chile

Isla Jorge Montt
- Location in Chile

Geography
- Location: Pacific Ocean
- Coordinates: 51°20′S 74°45′W
- Archipelago: Patagonian Archipelago
- Area: 537 km^{2} (207 sq mi)

Administration
- Chile

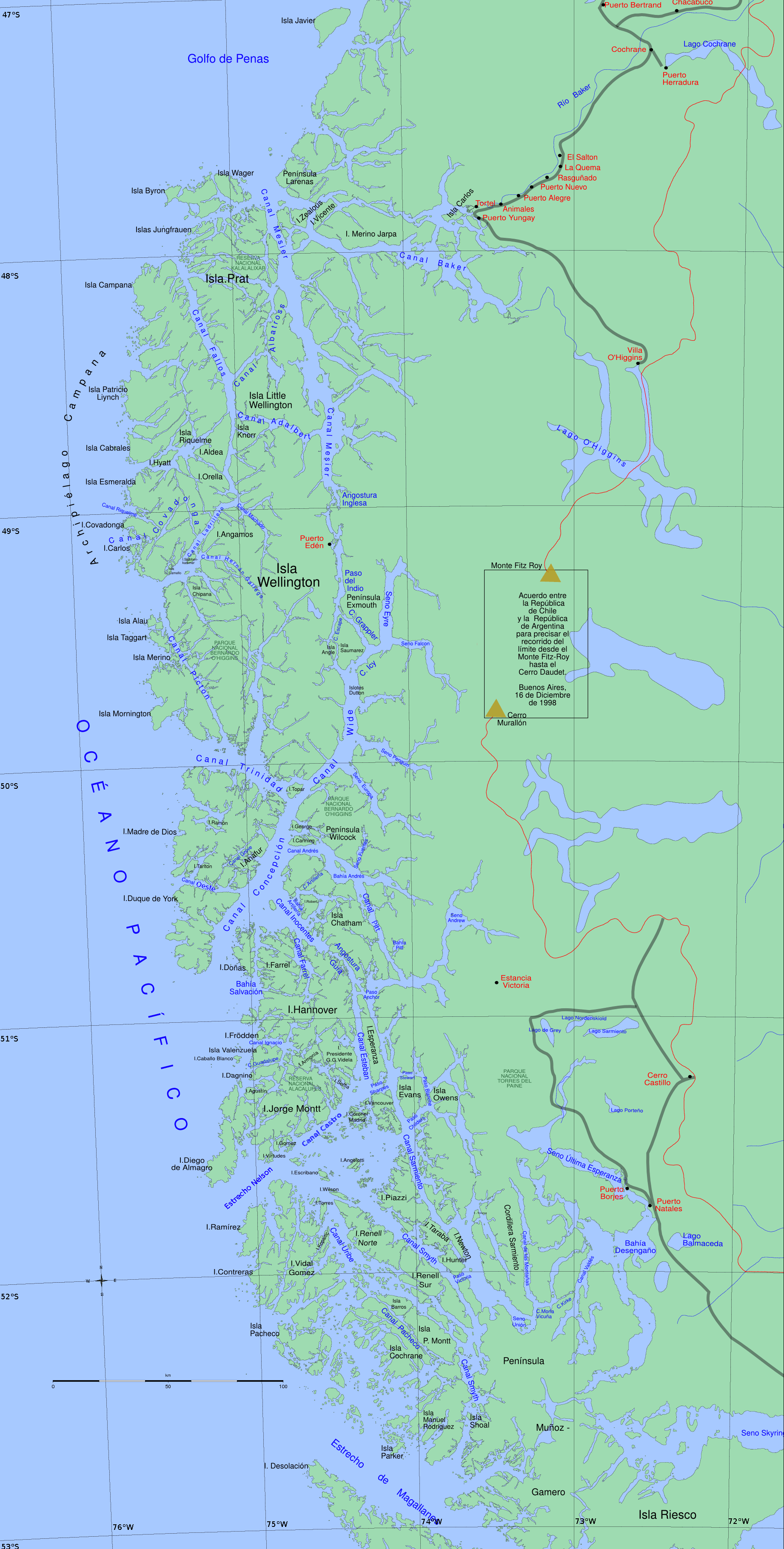
Islands and bodies of water around Hanover Island

Jorge Montt Island (Spanish: Isla Jorge Montt) is an island in the Patagonian Archipelago in Magallanes y la Antártica Chilena Region, Chile. It has an area of 537 km^{2}.

The island was named after Admiral Jorge Montt, President of Chile from 1891 until 1896.
