= Mont, Belgium =

Mont, Belgium may refer to:

- Mont, Bastogne, a village in the Luxembourg municipality of Bastogne
- Mont, Houffalize, a village in the Luxembourg municipality of Houffalize
- Mont, Malmedy, a hamlet in the Liège municipality of Malmedy
- Mont, Theux, a village in the Liège municipality of Theux
- Mont, Yvoir, a village in the Namur municipality of Yvoir
- Mont (Picard), Walloon and Picard name of the Hainaut city of Mons

== See also ==
- Mont (disambiguation)
