= Tránsito Florez =

Chilean First Lady (1820–1890)

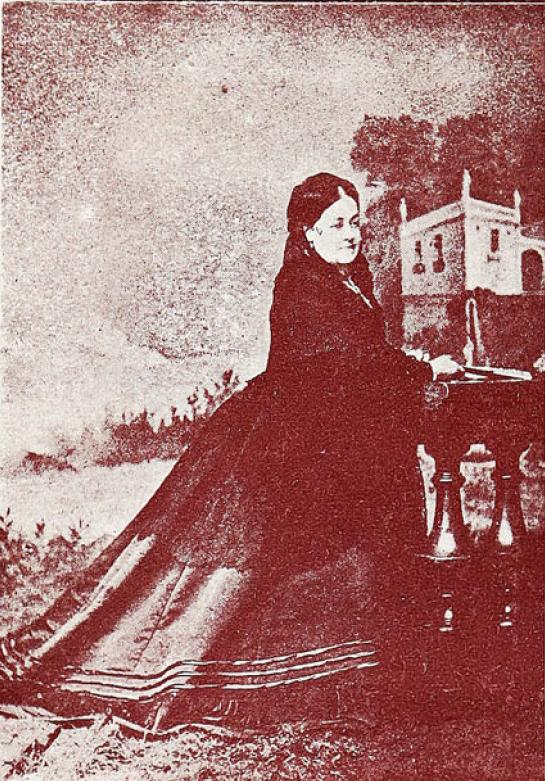

First Lady of Chile
- In role 1861–1871
- President: José Joaquín Pérez
- Preceded by: Rosario Montt
- Succeeded by: Eulogia Echaurren

Personal details
- Born: 1820 Santiago, Chile
- Died: 29 August 1890 (aged 69–70) Santiago, Chile
- Resting place: Santiago General Cemetery
- Spouse: José Joaquín Pére (m. 1840; died 1889)
- Children: 11

Tránsito Florez y de la Cavareda (1820 – 29 August 1890) was the Chilean First Lady between 1861 and 1871.

== Biography ==
Florez was born in 1820 in Santiago to Antonio Flórez de Valdés y Toro-Zambrano and Micaela de la Cavareda y Trucíos. On 9 April 1840, Florez married José Joaquín Pérez, a lawyer, politician and later 7th President of Chile. The couple had 11 children but only 5 daughters survived to adulthood:

- Jesús Pérez Florez; married the lawyer, farmer and politician Francisco García-Huidobro Eyzaguirre
- Luz Pérez Florez; second wife of Francisco García-Huidobro Eyzaguirre
- Florencia Pérez Florez; married the industrialist, miner, farmer and politician Antonio Valdés Cuevas
- Teresa Pérez Florez; married the farmer and politician Nicolás Barros Luco
- Gertrudis Pérez Florez; married the diplomat and politician Antonio Subercaseaux Vicuña

Although Florez carried out the duties of First Lady, she didn't play a prominent role. In the wake of the Iglesia de la Compañía Fire, Florez observed a period of strict mourning. Florez also observed a period of mourning during the Chincha Islands War.

On 29 August 1890, Florez died in Santiago and was buried at the Santiago General Cemetery.

Honorary titles
Preceded by Rosario Montt	First Lady of Chile; 1861–1871	Succeeded by Eulogia Echaurren
