= Tannay-le-Mont-Dieu =

- Commune
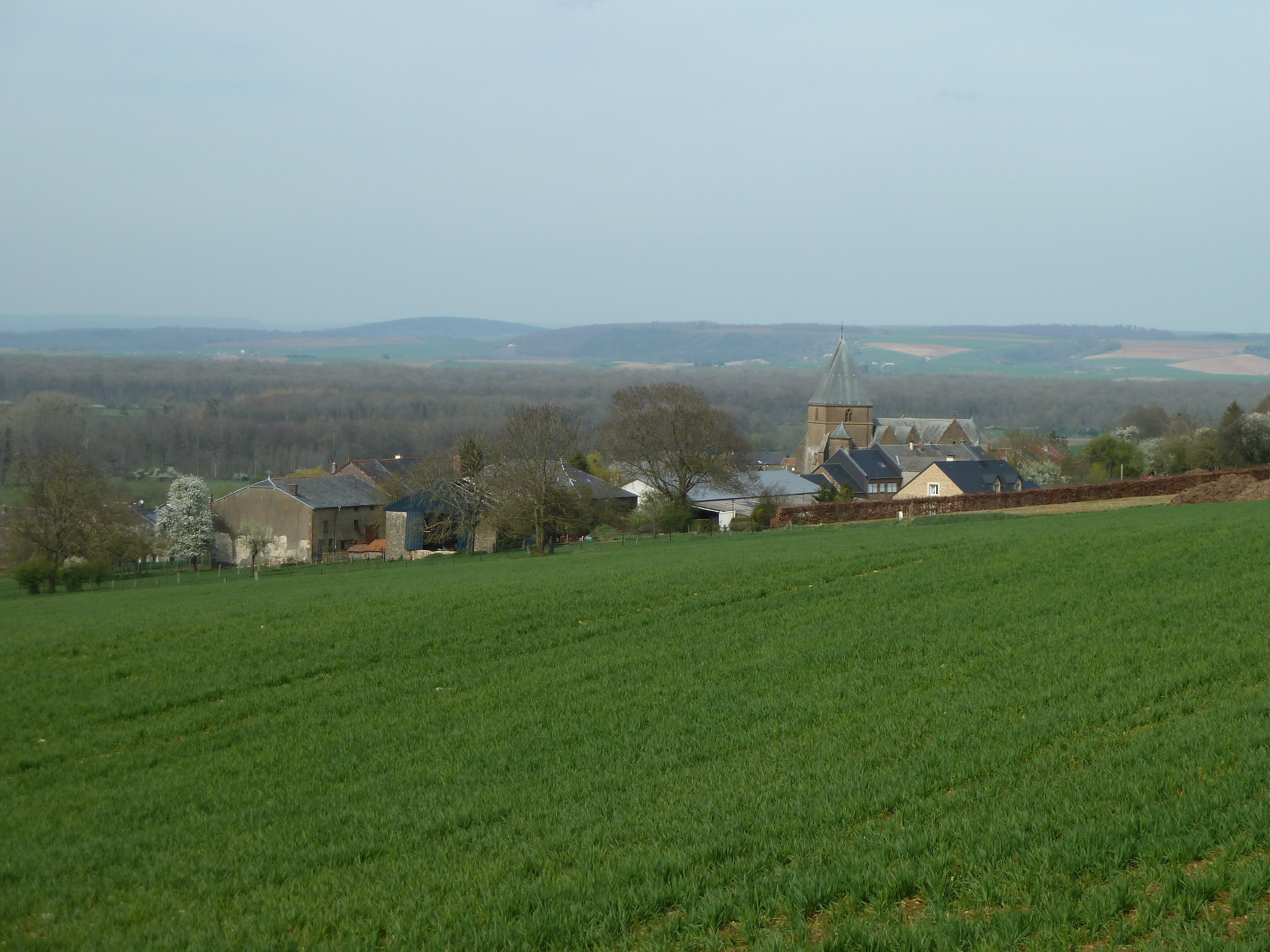
- Tannay
- Location of Tannay-le-Mont-Dieu
- Location within France Location within Grand Est
- Coordinates: 49°31′36″N 4°49′58″E
- Country: France
- Region: Grand Est
- Department: Ardennes
- Arrondissement: Vouziers
- Canton: Vouziers

Government
  - Mayor (2025–2026): Anne Fraipont
- Area^{1}: 32.76 km^{2} (12.65 sq mi)
- Population (2023): 163
  - Density: 4.98/km^{2} (12.9/sq mi)
- Time zone: UTC+01:00 (CET)
  - Summer (DST): UTC+02:00 (CEST)
- INSEE/Postal code: 08439 /08390
- ^{1} French Land Register data, which excludes lakes, ponds, glaciers > 1 km^{2} (0.386 sq mi or 247 acres) and river estuaries.

Tannay-le-Mont-Dieu (French pronunciation: [tanɛ lə mɔ̃ djø]) is a commune in the Ardennes department in northern France. It was formed on 1 January 2025, with the merger of Le Mont-Dieu and Tannay.

== See also ==
- Communes of the Ardennes department
