= Rose of the Golden West =

1927 film by George Fitzmaurice

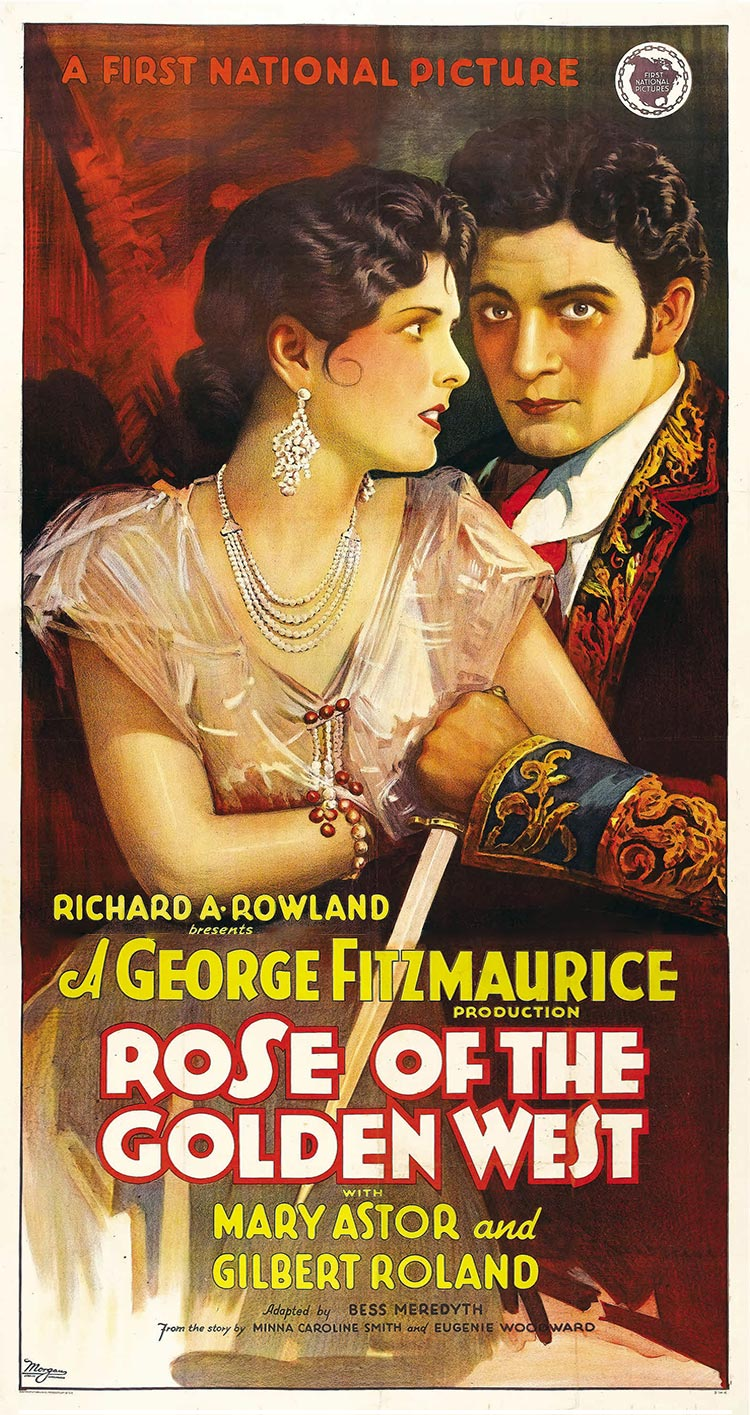
- Theatrical release poster
- Directed by: George Fitzmaurice
- Written by: Bess Meredyth (scenario, adaptation); Philip Bartolomae (scenario, adaptation); Mort Blumenstock (intertitles)
- Based on: "Rose of the Golden West" by Minna Caroline Smith and Eugenie Woodward
- Produced by: Richard A. Rowland
- Starring: Mary Astor; Gilbert Roland; Montagu Love
- Cinematography: Lee Garmes
- Distributed by: First National Pictures
- Release dates: September 25, 1927 (New York); October 2, 1927 (United States)
- Running time: 7 reels; 6,477 feet
- Country: United States
- Language: Silent (English intertitles)

Rose of the Golden West is a surviving 1927 American silent romantic drama film produced by Richard A. Rowland and released by First National Pictures. It was directed by George Fitzmaurice and starred Mary Astor and Gilbert Roland.

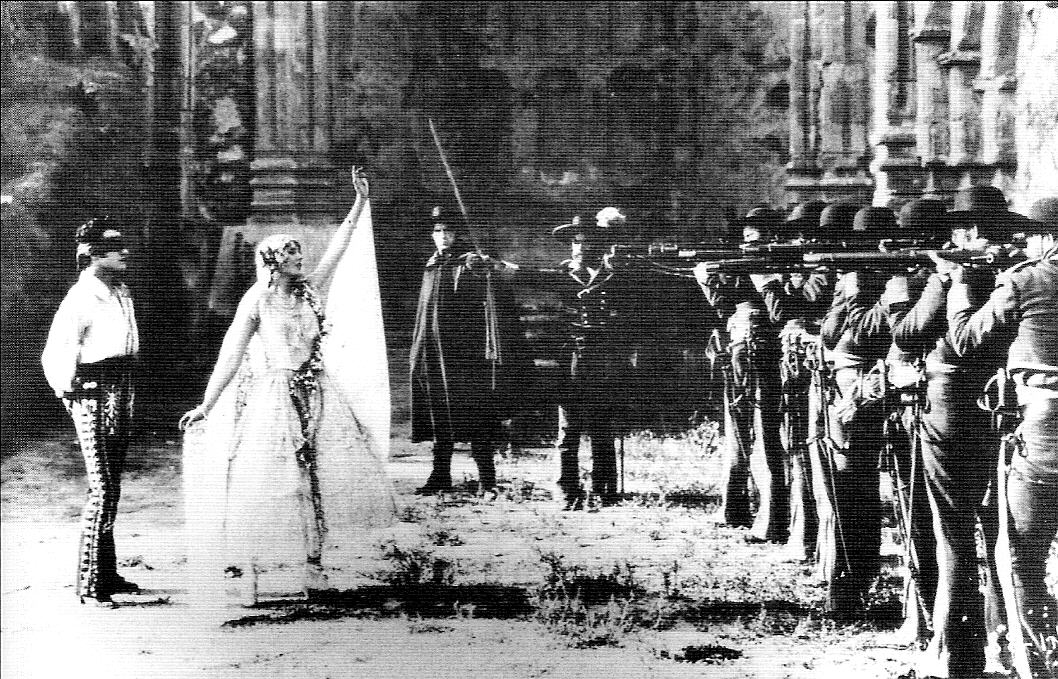
Screenshot from the film

== Cast ==
- Mary Astor as Elena Vallero
- Gilbert Roland as Juan
- Gustav von Seyffertitz as Gomez
- Montagu Love as General Vallero
- Flora Finch as Senora Comba
- Harvey Clark as Thomas Larkin
- Roel Muriel as The Mother Superior
- André Cheron as The Russian Prince
- Romaine Fielding as Secretary
- William Conklin as Commander Sloat
- Christina Montt as Senorita Gonzalez

== Preservation status ==
A print of Rose of the Golden West survives in the Narodni Filmovy Archiv.
