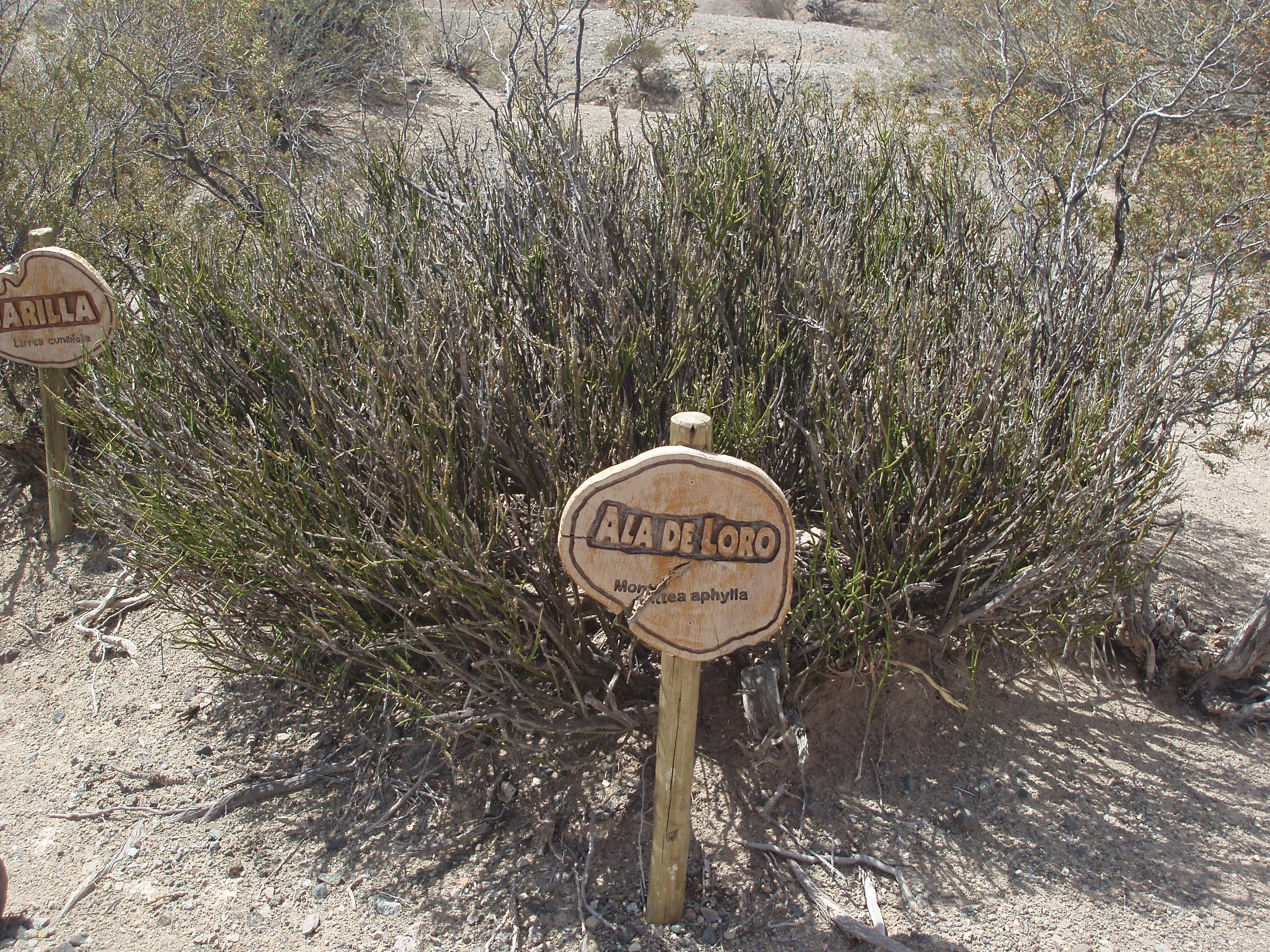
- Montreal aphylla

Scientific classification
- Kingdom: Plantae
- Clade: Tracheophytes
- Clade: Angiosperms
- Clade: Eudicots
- Clade: Asterids
- Order: Lamiales
- Family: Plantaginaceae
- Genus: Monttea; Gay

Synonyms
- Oxycladus Miers

= Monttea =

Genus of flowering plant

Monttea is a genus of flowering plants belonging to the family Plantaginaceae.

Its native range is southern South America and is found in Argentina and Chile.

The genus name of Monttea is in honour of Manuel Montt (1809–1880), a Chilean statesman and scholar. He was twice elected President of Chile between 1851 and 1861. It was first described and published in Fl. Chil. Vol.4 on page 416 in 1849.

== Known species ==
According to Kew:

- Monttea aphylla (Miers) Hauman
- Monttea chilensis J.Gay
- Monttea schickendantzii Griseb.
