= Monts =

Monts may refer to the following places in France:

- Monts, Indre-et-Loire, a commune in the Indre-et-Loire department
- Monts, Oise, a commune in the Oise department
- Alexander von Monts, German naval officer

== See also ==
- Monts Castle, Switzerland
- Mont (disambiguation)
