= Cristina Montt =

Actress from Chile

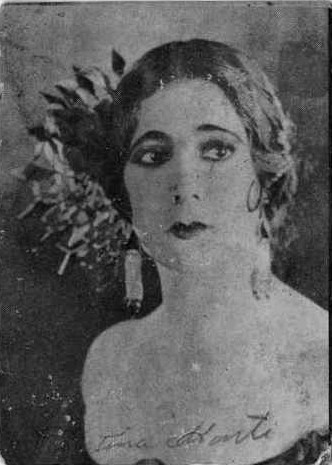
- Born: May 10, 1895; Talcahuano, Chile
- Died: April 22, 1969 (aged 73); Hollywood, California, U.S.
- Occupation: Actress
- Years active: 1924-38

Cristina Montt (May 10, 1895 – April 22, 1969) was a Chilean film star of silent and early sound films.

== Early life ==
She was born in Chile in 1895 into the well-known, political Montt family. Her granduncle, Manuel Montt, was twice president of Chile. Two other uncles also served as presidents of the South American nation. She moved to Los Angeles and became friendly with the big names in the film industry of the time. She first appeared in motion pictures in the United States in 1924. She performed in about 10 films between 1924 and 1938. For the most part her roles were very small.

On July 5, 1927, she announced her engagement to Mario Morano. He was also from an aristocratic South American family and worked in the film industry. Their romance began in Hollywood. Morano's real name was Mario Albuquerque De Maranhoa. He was the son of a Brazilian jurist. Morano came to the US in early 1927 after serving in the Brazilian diplomatic service. The planned wedding was cancelled only a few months later, in August. Cristina said that their Latin temperaments would make their marriage inadvisable.

== Career ==
She worked for First National Pictures. Her film career lasted until the late 1930s. She played the Infanta of Spain in The Sea Hawk (1924) of Frank Lloyd, and portrayed "Señorita González" in Rose of the Golden West, with Mary Astor. Her final roles were "Suzie" in Sam Wood's Madam X (1937), and uncredited ones in I'll Give A Million (1938) and Suez (1938).

== Later life ==
On August 27, 1927, the engagement of Cristina Montt and Mario Marano, both of the films and each representing families high in South American political circles, was broken, after existing only for a few months. Miss Montt said that she and Marano had decided their temperaments would make their marriage inadvisable.

In July 1928 Cristina Montt joined actors Al Jolson, Carmel Myers, and other motion picture persons for an event to benefit the United Jewish Appeal. It was held at the Breaker's Club in Santa Monica, California.

In 1935 she appeared in municipal court in Los Angeles, California on a drunken driving charge. The judge gave her a thirty-day suspended sentence after she proved that she had recently suffered a nervous breakdown. It was reported that Cristina was 34 years of age and was the widow of a former Chilean ambassador to Japan.

Cristina Montt died of coronary failure in Hollywood on April 22, 1969.

== Filmography ==
- The Sea Hawk (1924) - The Infanta of Spain
- Circe, the Enchantress (1924) - uncredited (a.k.a. Circe)
- The Fast Set (1924) (uncredited)
- Love's Wilderness (1924) (uncredited)
- The Dressmaker from Paris (1925) - uncredited
- Rose of the Golden West (1927) - Señorita González
- El Último de los Vargas (1930)
- Alma de Gaucho (1930) - Dona Cristina
- Fifty Fathoms Deep (1931) - Conchita
- Three on a Honeymoon (1934) - uncredited (Fortune Teller in Algerian Cafe)
- Madame X (1937) - uncredited (Suzie)
- I'll Give a Million (1938) - uncredited (Streetwalker)
- Suez (1938) - uncredited (Maid)
