= Rosario Montt =

First Lady of Chile (1820s–1894)

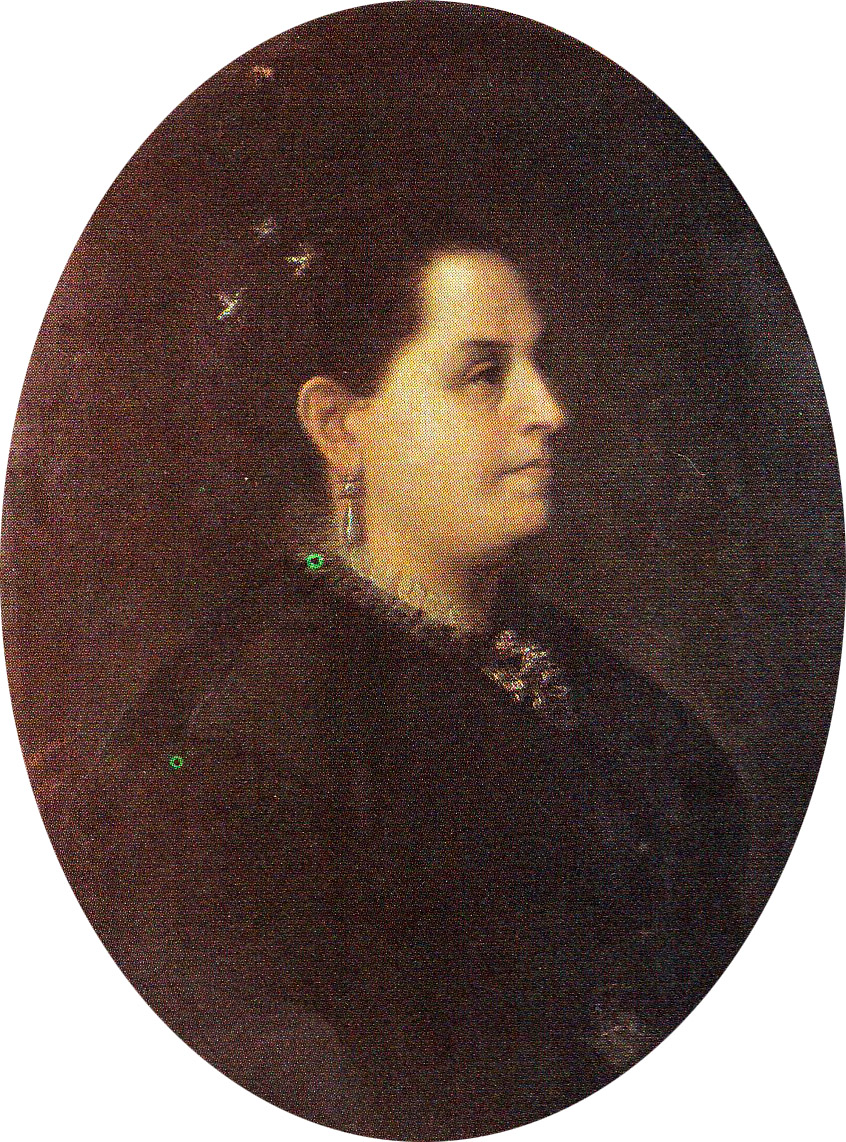
- 19th century portrait of Montt

First Lady of Chile
- In role 1851–1861
- President: Manuel Montt
- Preceded by: Enriqueta Pinto
- Succeeded by: Tránsito Florez de la Cavareda

Personal details
- Born: Rosario Montt Goyenechea; 1825 Chile
- Died: 2 December 1894 (aged 68–69) San Bernardo, Chile
- Spouse: Manuel Montt
- Children: 16, including Pedro Montt
- Relatives: José Anacleto Montt Goyenechea (brother); Jorge Montt (nephew); Sara del Campo (daughter-in-law); Ambrosio Montt Luco (son-in-law); Teresa Wilms Montt (great-granddaughter)

Rosario Montt de Montt (née Montt Goyenechea; 1825 – 2 December 1894) was the Chilean First Lady from 1851 to 1861.

== Early life ==
Montt was born Rosario Montt Goyenechea in 1825 in Chile to Filiberto Montt Prado (1758–1838) and María de la Luz Goyenechea de la Sierra. A member of the Montt family, Montt was the younger sister of the politician José Anacleto Montt Goyenechea.

== Marriage and legacy ==
On 30 May 1839, Montt married her cousin Manuel Montt, a lawyer and later 6th President of Chile, in Casablanca. They had sixteen children together. She was the First Lady of Chile from 1851 to 1861, during the presidency of her husband. Because he was the target of attempted assassinations, she was the only person allowed to shave her husband's face or cut his hair. She was widowed when Manuel Montt died in 1880, and she died in 1894, about seventy years old, in San Bernardo.

Montt's home in Santiago was declared a national historic site in 1981. From 1891 to 1896, her nephew Jorge Montt was president of Chile. From 1906 to 1910, her son Pedro Montt was president of Chile. Poet Teresa Wilms Montt was her great-granddaughter.

Honorary titles
| Preceded by Enriqueta Pinto | First Lady of Chile; 1851 | Succeeded by Tránsito Florez de la Cavareda |
