= José Joaquín Pérez =

Chilean politician and president

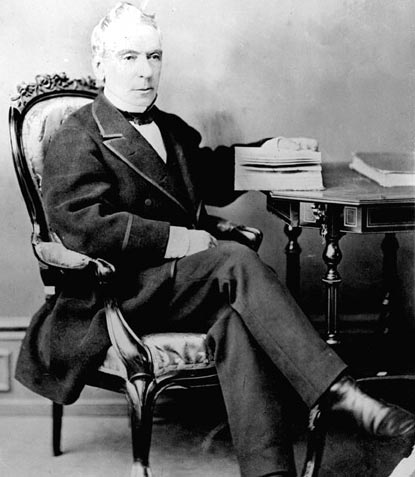

7th President of Chile
- In office September 18, 1861 – September 18, 1871
- Preceded by: Manuel Montt
- Succeeded by: Federico Errázuriz Zañartu

Personal details
- Born: 6 May 1801 Santiago, Chile
- Died: 1 July 1889 (aged 88) Santiago, Chile
- Party: National
- Spouse: Tránsito Florez de la Cavareda (m. 1840)
- Children: 11
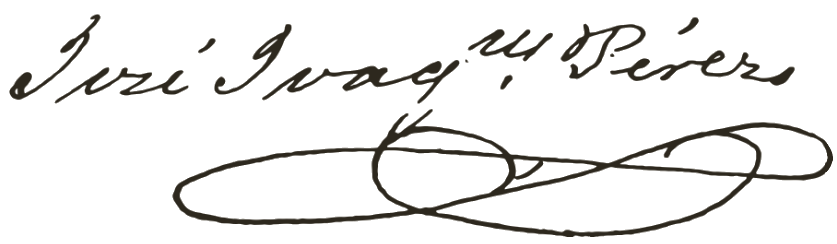
- Signature

José Joaquín Pérez Mascayano (Latin American Spanish: [xoˈse xo.aˈkim ˈpeɾes]; 6 May 1801 – 1 July 1889) was a Chilean lawyer, diplomat, and politician who served as President of Chile from 1861 to 1871.

== Early life and family ==
Pérez was born on 6 May 1801 in Santiago to Santiago Pérez Salas, a lawyer and politician, and María de la Luz Mascayano y Larraín. Pérez studied humanities at the Real Colegio Carolino and the Instituto Nacional before earning a law degree from the Royal University of San Felipe. His early career focused on diplomacy, serving as secretary of the Chilean legation in Washington, D.C. in 1826, chargé d'affaires in France in 1829, and representative to Buenos Aires in 1830.

On 9 April 1840, Pérez married Tránsito Florez de la Cavareda. The couple had 11 children but only 5 daughters survived to adulthood:

- Jesús Pérez Florez; married the lawyer, farmer and politician Francisco García-Huidobro Eyzaguirre
- Luz Pérez Florez; second wife of Francisco García-Huidobro Eyzaguirre
- Florencia Pérez Florez; married the industrialist, miner, farmer and politician Antonio Valdés Cuevas
- Teresa Pérez Florez; married the farmer and politician Nicolás Barros Luco
- Gertrudis Pérez Florez; married the diplomat and politician Antonio Subercaseaux Vicuña

== Career ==
Pérez entered politics as a Deputy for Aconcagua Province in 1826 and later held seats for Puchacay, Curicó, and Santiago. He also served as Minister of the Interior and Minister of Foreign Relations under President Manuel Bulnes. During his tenure as a Senator and State Councillor under Manuel Montt, Pérez remained neutral in political conflicts, positioning him as a unifying candidate for the presidency in 1861.

== Presidency ==
As president, Pérez's administration promoted reconciliation and reform. He enacted an amnesty law for political disputes from 1851 to 1861, allowed greater freedom of the press, and passed the Law of Freedom of Worship in 1865. His government oversaw key infrastructure projects, including the completion of the Valparaíso–Santiago railway, and addressed major national events, such as the fire at the Church of the Company of Jesus in 1863, which led to the establishment of the Santiago Fire Department. Pérez also signed the 1866 border treaty with Bolivia and conducted a national census, recording a population of over 1.8 million.

Under his presidency, Chile expanded into Araucanía lands, fighting against the indigenous.

Re-elected in 1866, Pérez faced economic challenges due to debts incurred during the Chincha Islands War (1865–1866) against Spain. His second term included constitutional reforms, such as the prohibition of immediate presidential re-election, enacted shortly before he left office in 1871.

Following his presidency, Pérez continued to serve in political roles, including as a Senator. He died in Santiago in 1889 at the age of 88.

Political offices
Preceded by Manuel Camilo Vial	Minister of the Interior and Foreign Affairs; 1849–1850	Succeeded by Antonio Varas
Preceded by Manuel Montt	President of Chile; 1861–1871	Succeeded by Federico Errázuriz Zañartu
Preceded by Alvaro Covarrubias	President of the Senate of Chile; 1873–1876	Succeeded by Alvaro Covarrubias
