= Tannay, Ardennes =

Tannay
- Part of Tannay-le-Mont-Dieu
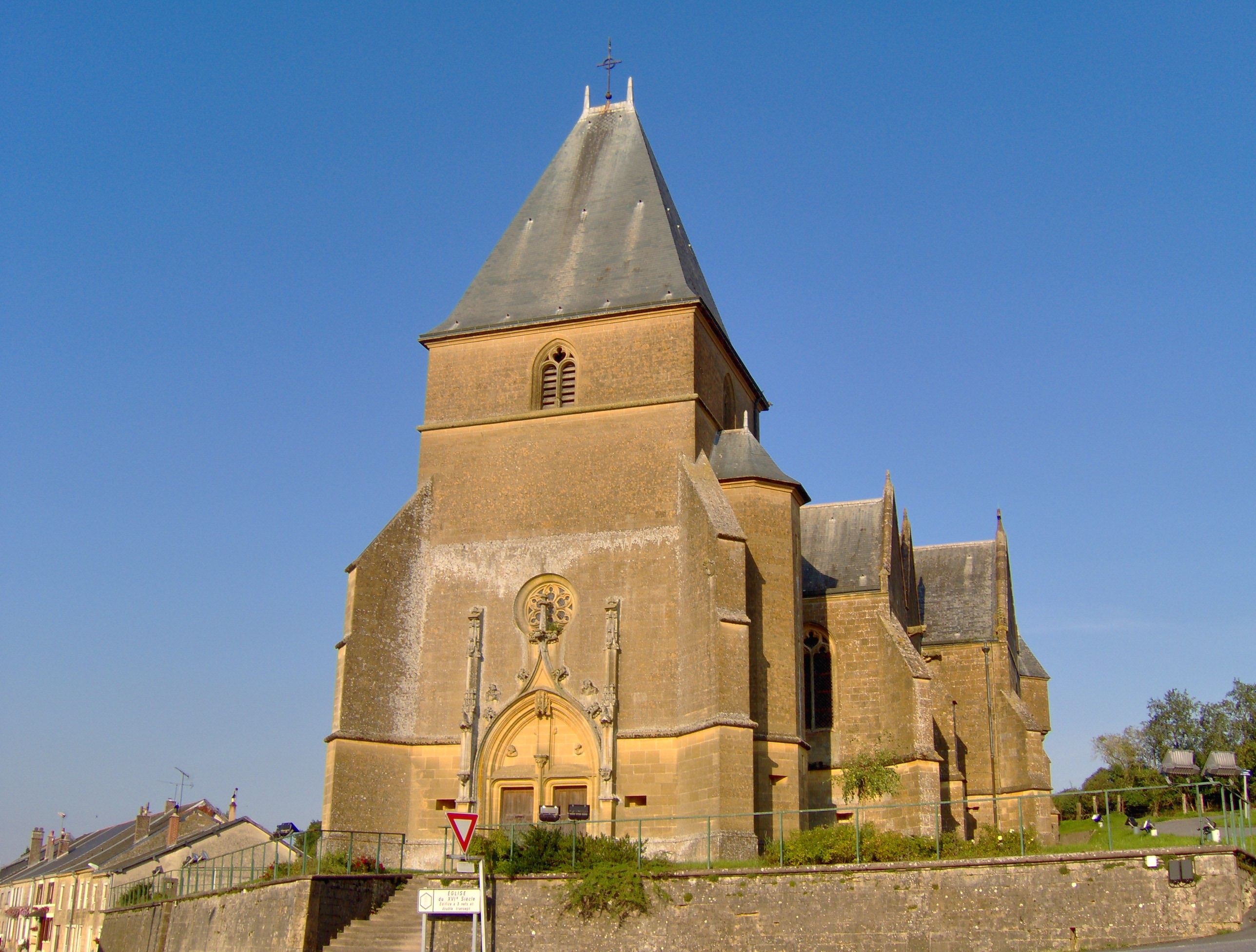
- The church in Tannay

- Coat of arms
- Location of Tannay
- Location within France Location within Grand Est
- Coordinates: 49°31′38″N 4°50′01″E
- Country: France
- Region: Grand Est
- Department: Ardennes
- Arrondissement: Vouziers
- Canton: Vouziers
- Intercommunality: Argonne Ardennaise
- Commune: Tannay-le-Mont-Dieu
- Area^{1}: 14.04 km^{2} (5.42 sq mi)
- Elevation: 202 m (663 ft)
- Highest elevation: 276 m (906 ft)
- Lowest elevation: 160 m (520 ft)
- Population (2022): 151
  - Density: 10.8/km^{2} (27.9/sq mi)
- Time zone: UTC+01:00 (CET)
  - Summer (DST): UTC+02:00 (CEST)
- Postal code: 08390
- ^{1} French Land Register data, which excludes lakes, ponds, glaciers > 1 km^{2} (0.386 sq mi or 247 acres) and river estuaries.

Tannay (French pronunciation: [tanɛ]) is a former commune in the Ardennes department and Grand Est region of north-eastern France. It was merged with Le Mont-Dieu to form Tannay-le-Mont-Dieu on 1 January 2025.

== Population ==
Historical population
Year	Pop.	±% p.a.
1968	164	—
1975	155	−0.80%
1982	145	−0.95%
1990	135	−0.89%
1999	149	+1.10%
2009	155	+0.40%
2014	159	+0.51%
2020	147	−1.30%
Source: INSEE

== See also ==
- Communes of the Ardennes department
