= Mont (surname) =

Mont is a surname. Notable people with the surname include:

- Christopher Mont, 16th-century English diplomat
- Fiona Mont (born 1970), British fugitive wanted for questioning about computer fraud
- Mia Mont (born 1989), Peruvian singer-songwriter
- Tommy Mont (1922–2012), American educator, university administrator, college football coach, and National Football League quarterback

== See also ==
- Jordy Mont-Reynaud (born 1983), American chess player
- Fernando Gómez Mont (born 1963), Mexican lawyer and politician
