= Mercedes Belzú de Dorado =

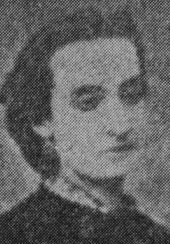

Mercedes Belzú de Dorado (1835–1879) was a Bolivian poet and translator. She was born in La Paz, the daughter of Manuel Isidro Belzu and Juana Manuela Gorriti. Her father was a politician who became president of Bolivia, and her mother a well-known writer. She was educated at the college of Damasa Cabezon where she started to express her literary talents. She married young and lived in Europe for four years, before returning to her native country. This was interrupted by political upheaval, which drove her to live in exile for a few years in Arequipa, Peru. She published extensively during this sojourn, fully participating in the literary life of the city. Among her noted poems is the composition "Al Misti".

Her final years were spent between Bolivia and Peru. Knowledgeable in English and French, she also produced translations of Lamartine, Hugo and Shakespeare.
