= Archipelagoes of Patagonia =

Coordinates: 50°S 75°W

The landmass known as Patagonia hosts a series of archipelagoes, all of them located on its western and southern coast. These archipelagoes, with the exception of Tierra del Fuego (which is shared with Argentina), lie in Chile and in the Pacific Ocean, covering about one third of Chile's coast.

The United States Hydrographic Office, stated in its South America Pilot (1916):

The Patagonian Archipelago, the range of islands lying west of Tierra del Fuego and stretching along the western coast of Patagonia for 11° of latitude north of the western entrance to Magellan Strait, is about as inhospitable a land as is to be found in the globe, especially in its more southern parts. The land is mountainous, presenting an alternation of matted forest, bare rock, and deep bogs, and is cut up by deep channels into peninsulas and islands whose forms are yet very imperfectly known. Drenching rains, varied by snow and sleet, prevail throughout the year, while furious westerly gales succeed each other with rapidity. The scenery is magnificently stern, but is seldom seen to advantage, the clouds and mists usually screening the higher peaks and snow fields. Glaciers, however, extend in many places either nearly or quite to the level of the sea. In such a climate life is scarce, sea fowl and a few wild fowl being the main representatives of the animal kingdom.
The scenery in the western portion of the Strait is grand and savage. The snow-capped peaks supply ice and snow for numerous glaciers, which descend nearly to the sea in some places, and frequently crown the precipices. Many waterfalls and cascades, some of which are of great height, fall into the bays, furnishing scenery that rivals the fiords of Norway. It is unfortunate for the voyager in these parts that the weather is such as to render exceptional an opportunity to witness this grandeur of the best advantage.

Location of the Archipelagoes of Patagonia

The archipelagoes of Patagonia include:

- Calbuco Archipelago
- Campana Archipelago
- Chiloé Archipelago
- Chonos Archipelago
- Diego Ramírez Islands
- Guaitecas Archipelago
- Guayaneco Archipelago
- Hanover Archipelago
- Madre de Dios Archipelago
- Mornington Archipelago
- North Archipelago
- Queen Adelaide Archipelago
- Tierra del Fuego Archipelago
  - Hermite Islands
  - Ildefonso Islands
  - Wollaston Islands
- Wellington Archipelago

== See also ==
- Borde costero
- List of islands of Chile
