= Metal-organic nanotube =

Class of chemical substance

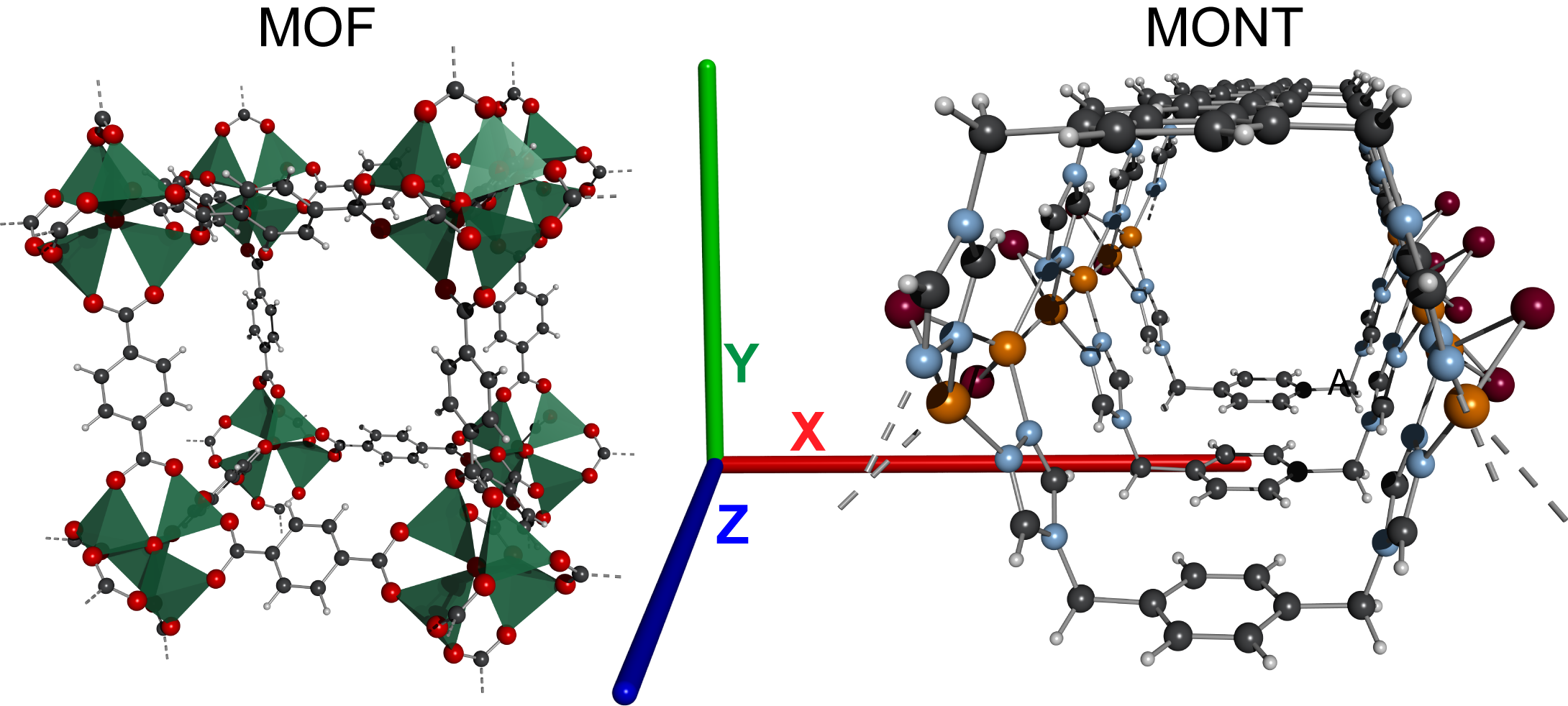
Structural comparison of an isotropic MOF and an anisotropic MONT.

Metal–organic nanotubes (MONTs) are a class of crystalline coordination polymers consisting of organic ligands bonded to a metal or metal cluster that form single-walled one-dimensional porous structures. The usage of organic ligands allows the properties of the resulting material to be tuned, as in the parent class of metal-organic frameworks (MOFs), but like carbon nanotubes, MONTs are anisotropic structures.

== Structure ==
MONTs have three main components: an organic bridging ligand, an inorganic metal or metal cluster, and a capping ligand that limits the dimensionality of the resulting structure. The bridging ligand is typically di-, tri- or tetravalent, while the capping ligand and metal form structures analogous to secondary building units (SBUs) in MOFs. MONTs have topologies that can be classified as helical coils, stacked macrocyclic rings, pillars of metal-ligand chains, or (m,n) scaffold nets.

Helical coil MONTs can be thought of as a linear coordination polymer that is warped into a spiral conformation, resulting in a tube-shaped structure. Macrocyclic ring MONTs are macrocycles fused via coordination bonds to construct an infinite tube. Pillar-chain MONTs are two, three, or four metal-anion linear chains connected via organic linkers to form a nanotube. (m,n) scaffold nets are constructed from a single organic linker functioning as nodes in a topological net, where "m" represents the number of metal linkers while "n" represents the number of organic nodes.

== Synthesis and properties ==
MONTs are synthesized primarily via a bottom-up solvothermal synthesis approach from a mixture of organic ligands and metal. In bottom-up syntheses, ligands coordinate to metals and rapidly form pre-MONT crystallites that ripen into well-developed crystals through equilibrium processes. This process can expel defects as discrete molecules add to existing crystal structures reversibly over the course of hours to days. Guest molecules such as dimethylformamide or N-methyl-2-pyrrolidone often play a vital role in the formation of MONTs.

Another route of MONT synthesis is performed via curling a 2-D sheet into a nanotube. This method relies on exfoliation of the sheet, enabled by weak interlayer interactions. Once the sheets have been separated, chemical stresses induced by a host material force the sheet to curl upon itself and form a MONT.

Careful selection of ligands and metals in MONTs allow tunable pore sizes and dimensions, resulting in applications such as fluid separations, hydrogen storage, as an ion exchange material, and chemical sensing.

== See also ==
- Coordination chemistry
- Coordination polymers
- Covalent organic framework
- Macromolecular assembly
- Metal–inorganic framework
- Metal-organic framework
- Omar M. Yaghi
- Organometallic chemistry
- Porous polymer
- Reticular chemistry
- Susumu Kitagawa
- X-ray Crystallography
- Zeolitic imidazolate frameworks
