= Le Mont-Dieu =

Commune in Ardennes, France

- Part of Tannay-le-Mont-Dieu
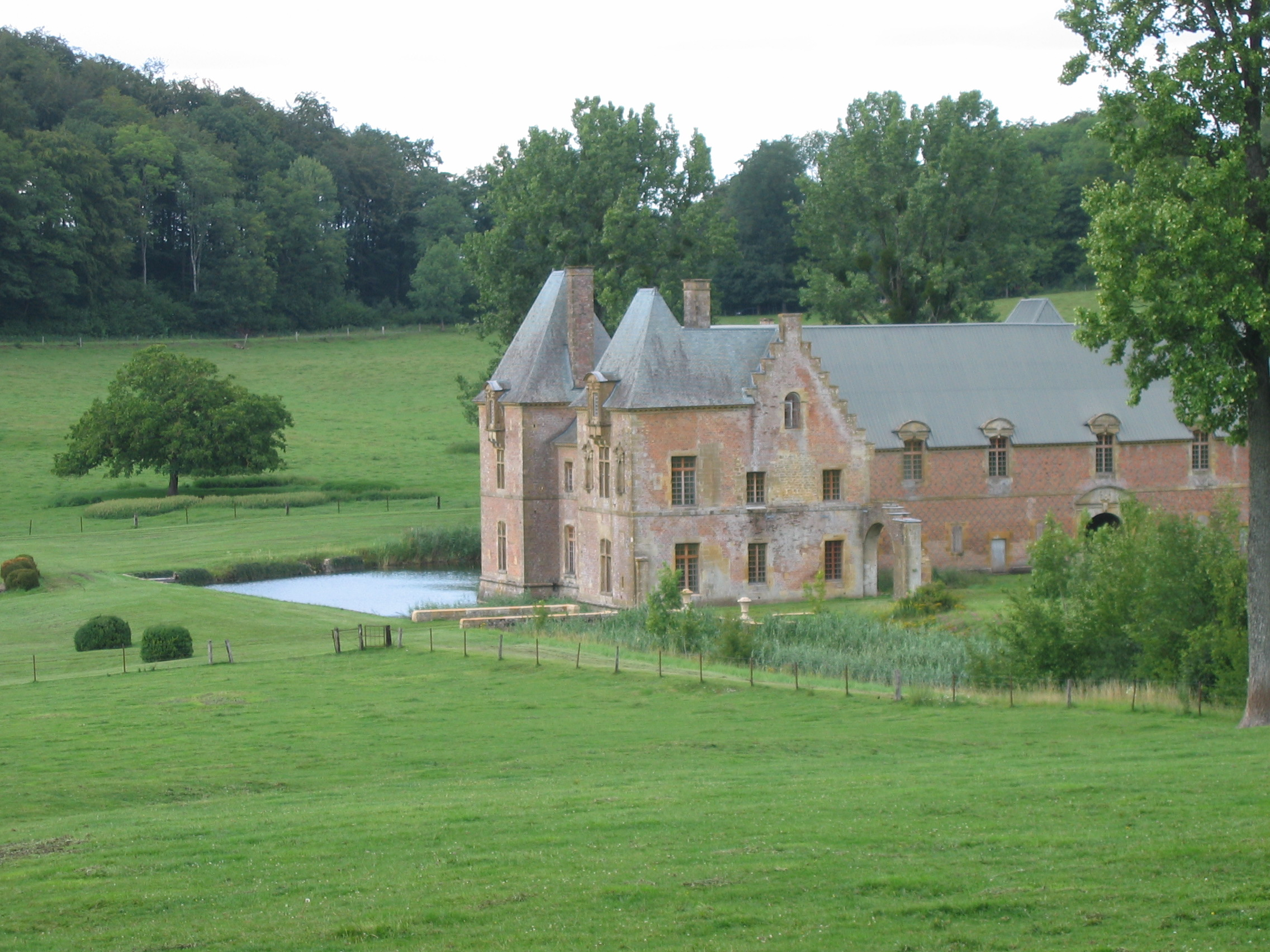
- The Chartreuse in Le Mont-Dieu
- Location of Le Mont-Dieu
- Location within France Location within Grand Est
- Coordinates: 49°32′52″N 4°51′59″E
- Country: France
- Region: Grand Est
- Department: Ardennes
- Arrondissement: Vouziers
- Canton: Vouziers
- Commune: Tannay-le-Mont-Dieu
- Area^{1}: 18.72 km^{2} (7.23 sq mi)
- Elevation: 200 m (660 ft)
- Highest elevation: 325 m (1,066 ft)
- Lowest elevation: 157 m (515 ft)
- Population (2022): 11
  - Density: 0.59/km^{2} (1.5/sq mi)
- Time zone: UTC+01:00 (CET)
  - Summer (DST): UTC+02:00 (CEST)
- Postal code: 08390
- ^{1} French Land Register data, which excludes lakes, ponds, glaciers > 1 km^{2} (0.386 sq mi or 247 acres) and river estuaries.

Le Mont-Dieu (French pronunciation: [lə mɔ̃ djø]) is a former commune in the Ardennes department in northern France. It was merged with Tannay to form Tannay-le-Mont-Dieu on 1 January 2025.

== See also ==
- Communes of the Ardennes department
