= Manuel Montt =

President of Chile from 1851 to 1861

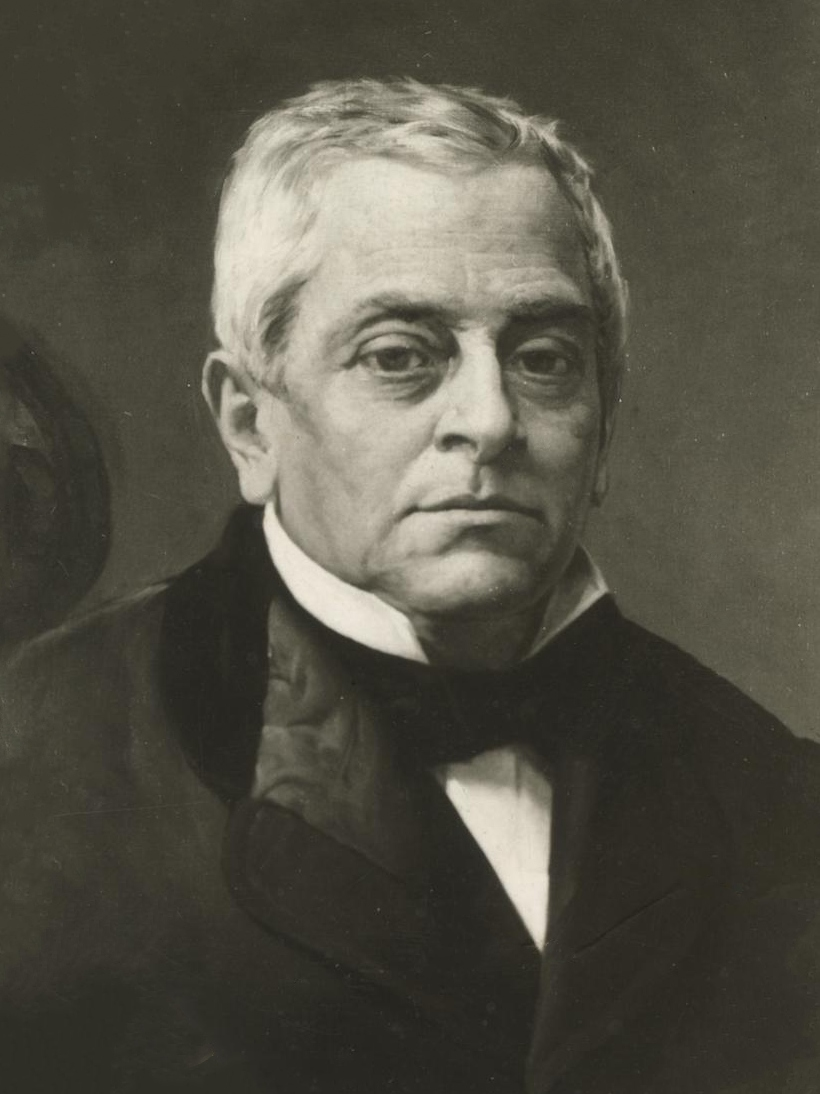
- Montt in 1868

6th President of Chile
- In office September 18, 1851 – September 18, 1861
- Preceded by: Manuel Bulnes
- Succeeded by: José Joaquín Pérez

Personal details
- Born: September 4, 1809 Petorca, Viceroyalty of Peru
- Died: September 21, 1880 (aged 71) Santiago, Chile
- Party: Conservative (until 1857); National (from 1857)
- Spouse: Rosario Montt Goyenechea
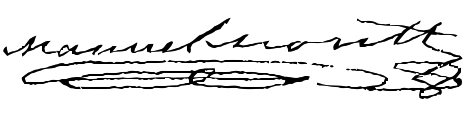
- Signature

Manuel Francisco Antonio Julián Montt Torres (Latin American Spanish: [maˈnwel ˈmont]; September 4, 1809 – September 21, 1880) was a Chilean statesman and scholar who was twice elected President of Chile between 1851 and 1861. He was the first civilian to serve a full term as President of Chile.

His election as President in 1851 set off Revolution of 1851, which Montt successfully subdued. During his tenure, he governed in an increasingly authoritarian manner.

== Biography ==
Manuel Francisco Antonio Julián Montt Torres was born in Petorca, Valparaíso Region, the son of Catalan immigrants. His grandparents emigrated from Granollers in Catalonia in the 1780s. His family was very poor, and in 1822 the death of his father increased their hardship. The same year, Manuel's mother secured his entrance into the Instituto Nacional (National Institute, where he would later serve as rector from 1835 to 1840), though he could only afford the fees by tutoring other students. After studying law at the Instituto Nacional, he graduated as a lawyer in 1833 and soon achieved prominent academic and government posts.

Montt had a distinguished career as a scholar and was introduced into public life during the presidency (1831–1841) of José Joaquín Prieto by Diego Portales. Montt distinguished himself by his courage in the crisis that followed upon Portales' assassination in 1837, though only holding a subordinate post in the government. In 1840, Montt was elected to the National Congress of Chile. He served as minister of the interior and minister of justice under President Manuel Bulnes (in office from 1841 to 1851). He emphasized the need for educational and scientific progress in the Chile, and was Minister of public instruction for a time. He was also twice Minister of Interior and Foreign Affairs during the Bulnes administration.

In 1849, botanist Claude Gay named Monttea, a genus of flowering plants from Argentina and Chile, belonging to the family Plantaginaceae in Manuel Montt's honour.

=== Presidency ===
In 1851 Montt won the Chilean presidency, but the liberals regarded his election as fraudulent and instigated an armed revolt, the Revolution of 1851, which was quickly subdued. Montt represented the conservative oligarchy and was authoritarian and inflexible in his beliefs, but he also worked for the economic and social progress of his nation. He angered the conservatives when he asserted the state's right of patronage in Chile's Roman Catholic Church and when he supported the abolition of restrictions on the sale or bequeathing of landed estates. His administration made advances in commerce and banking, codified Chilean laws, strongly promoted public education and immigration, and colonized the area south of the Bío-Bío River.

Manuel Montt, as Chile's first civilian president, furthered the reforms begun by Diego Portales. With Vicente Perez Rosales, the Minister of Immigration, he encouraged the settlement of German immigrants in the south of the country. The city of Puerto Montt, at the centre of the newly settled lands, honours his name. He governed Chile with an energy and wisdom that laid the foundation of her material prosperity. He was ably assisted by his minister of the interior Antonio Varas, and from the co-operation of the two statesmen the well-known ultra-conservative faction, the Montt-Varistas, took their name. His presidency featured the establishment of railways, telegraphs, banks, schools and training-colleges. Near the end of his second term, when Montt indicated a preference for Varas, his minister of the interior, to become his successor, liberals again staged an armed uprising (1859). Montt again subdued the revolt, but pacified the liberals by shifting his support to José Joaquín Pérez, who was a moderate.

=== Later life ===
On giving up the presidency in 1861, Montt became President of the Supreme Court of Chile, a position which he held up to his death in September 1880. Manuel Montt's nephew Jorge (born 1846) served as president of Chile in 1891–1896, as did Manuel Montt's son, Pedro (died 1910), between 1906 and 1910.

Manuel Montt died in Santiago de Chile on September 21, 1880, aged 71. He gives his name to the town of Puerto Montt.

== See also ==
- Montt family
- Manuel Montt metro station, on the Santiago Metro

== Sources ==
- P. B. Figueroa, Diccionario biografico de Chile, 1550–1887 (Santiago, 1888)
- J. B. Suarez, Rasgos biograficos de hombres notables de Chile (Valparaiso, 1886)

Political offices
Preceded by Joaquín Tocornal	Minister of the Interior and Foreign Affairs; 1840–1841	Succeeded by José Miguel Yrarrázaval
Preceded by Ramón de la Cavareda	Minister of War and Navy; 1841	Succeeded by José María de la Cruz
Preceded by Ramón Luis Yrarrázaval	Minister of the Interior and Foreign Affairs; 1845–1846	Succeeded by Manuel Camilo Vial
Preceded by Manuel Bulnes	President of Chile; 1851–1861	Succeeded by José Joaquín Pérez
Legal offices
Preceded by Juan de Dios Vial	President of the Supreme Court; 1850–1851	Succeeded by Ramón Luis Yrarrázaval
Preceded by Manuel Cerda	President of the Supreme Court; 1861–1880	Succeeded by José Miguel Barriga
