= Manuel Montt metro station =

Santiago metro station

Manuel Montt
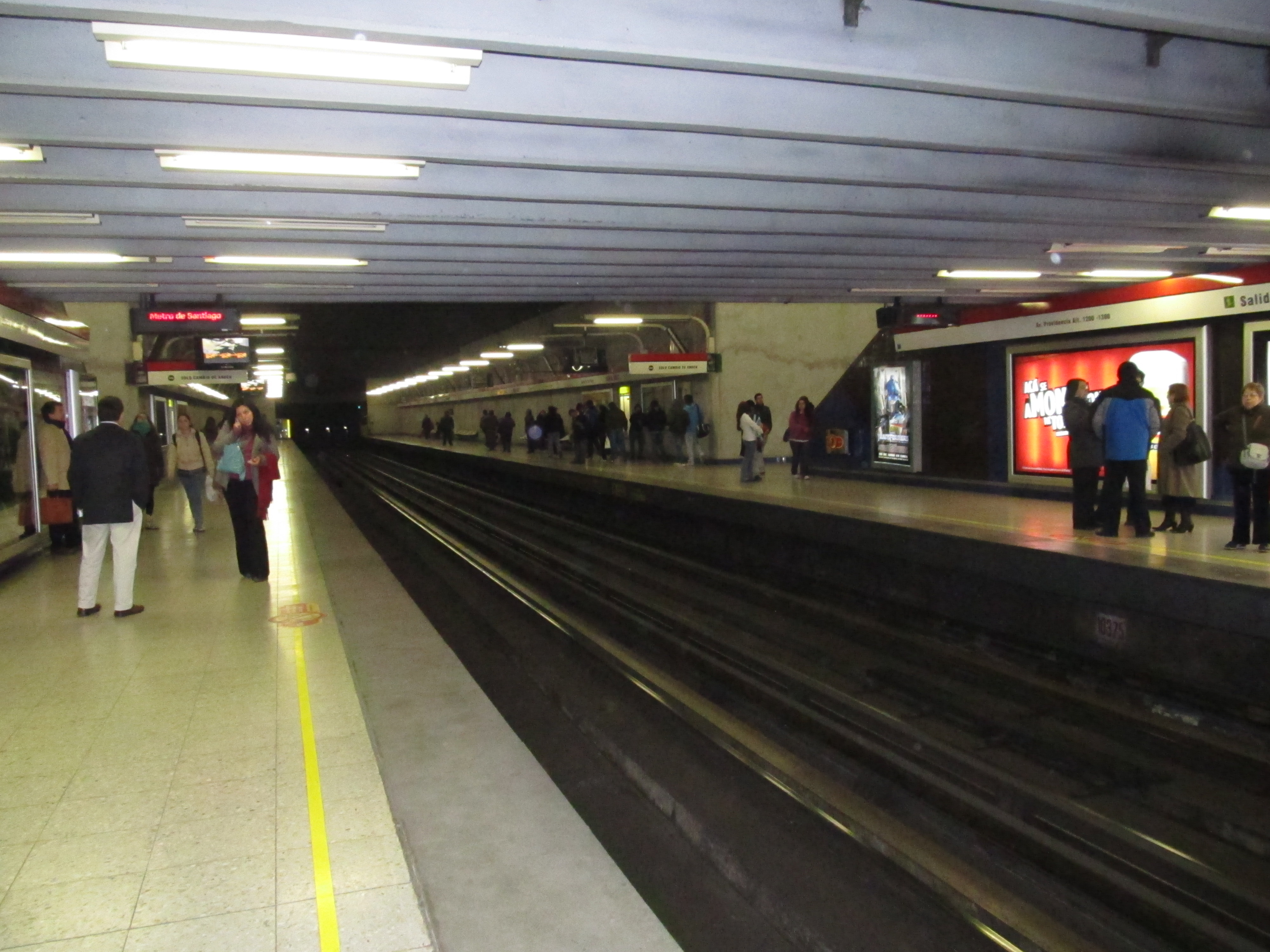
- The station in 2011

General information
- Location: Nueva Providencia Avenue / Manuel Montt Avenue
- Coordinates: 33°25′42.85″S 70°37′11.32″W
- System: Santiago rapid transit
- Line: Line 1
- Platforms: 2 side platforms
- Tracks: 2
- Connections: Transantiago buses

History
- Opened: August 31, 1980

Services
Preceding station	Santiago Metro	Following station
Salvador towards San Pablo	Line 1	Pedro de Valdivia towards Los Dominicos
Location

Manuel Montt is an underground metro station on the Line 1 of the Santiago Metro, in Santiago, Chile. It was opened on 22 August 1980 as part of the metro extension from Salvador to Escuela Militar. Initially its walls were covered with stoneware ceramic tiles of blue and orange colors, some of which loosen or fall off as a consequence of the 2010 Chile earthquake. The total replacement of its wall tiles is underway.
