= Ambrosio Montt Luco =

Chilean politician and lawyer

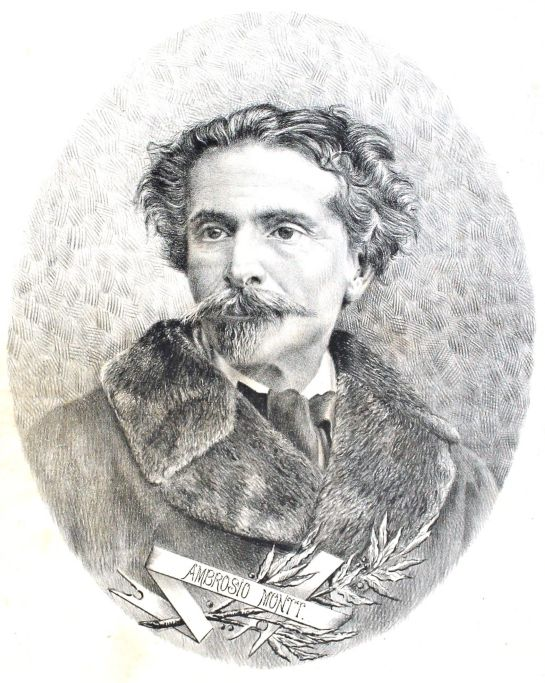
Ambrosio Montt Luco

Ambrosio Montt Luco (December 7, 1830 – February 18, 1899) was a Chilean politician, diplomat, lawyer and writer. Between 1883 and 1886 he was a diplomat to Argentina, Uruguay, England and the Holy See.
