= José Anacleto Montt Goyenechea =

Chilean politician and lawyer

Member of Parliament, Republic of Chile
- In office 1852–1855
- Preceded by: Francisco Álvarez Pérez
- Succeeded by: Francisco Javier Ovalle Bezanilla
- Constituency: Santiago de Chile

Personal details
- Born: 1802 Valparaíso, Viceroyalty of Peru
- Died: 1867 (aged 64–65) Santiago de Chile, Chile
- Citizenship: Chilean
- Party: Caupolicán Society
- Spouse: Mercedes Pérez Vergara
- Occupation: Lawyer

José Anacleto Montt Goyenechea (1802–1867) was a Chilean politician and lawyer. He was born in Valparaiso in 1802 and died in Santiago in 1867. He was the son of Filiberto Montt Prado and María de la Luz Goyenechea de la Sierra and the brother of Rosario Montt Goyenechea, former First Lady of Chile. He married Mercedes Pérez Vergara with whom he had seven children.

== Career ==
Goyenechea was part of the pelucon army in the 1830 Civil War. With the triumph of conservatism, he acceded to the secretariat of the Municipality of Valparaíso and, later became an adviser to the Ministry of Justice, Culture and Education, 1837-1841, in the government of José Joaquín Prieto. Advocate of the Conservative government, he joined the Caupolican Company in order to oppose the resistant liberals of the Sociedad de la Igualdad (Equal Society). He was elected Member of Parliament for Santiago for the 1852-1855 term, integrating in this period, the Standing Committee on Education and Welfare.
