= Emplastro =

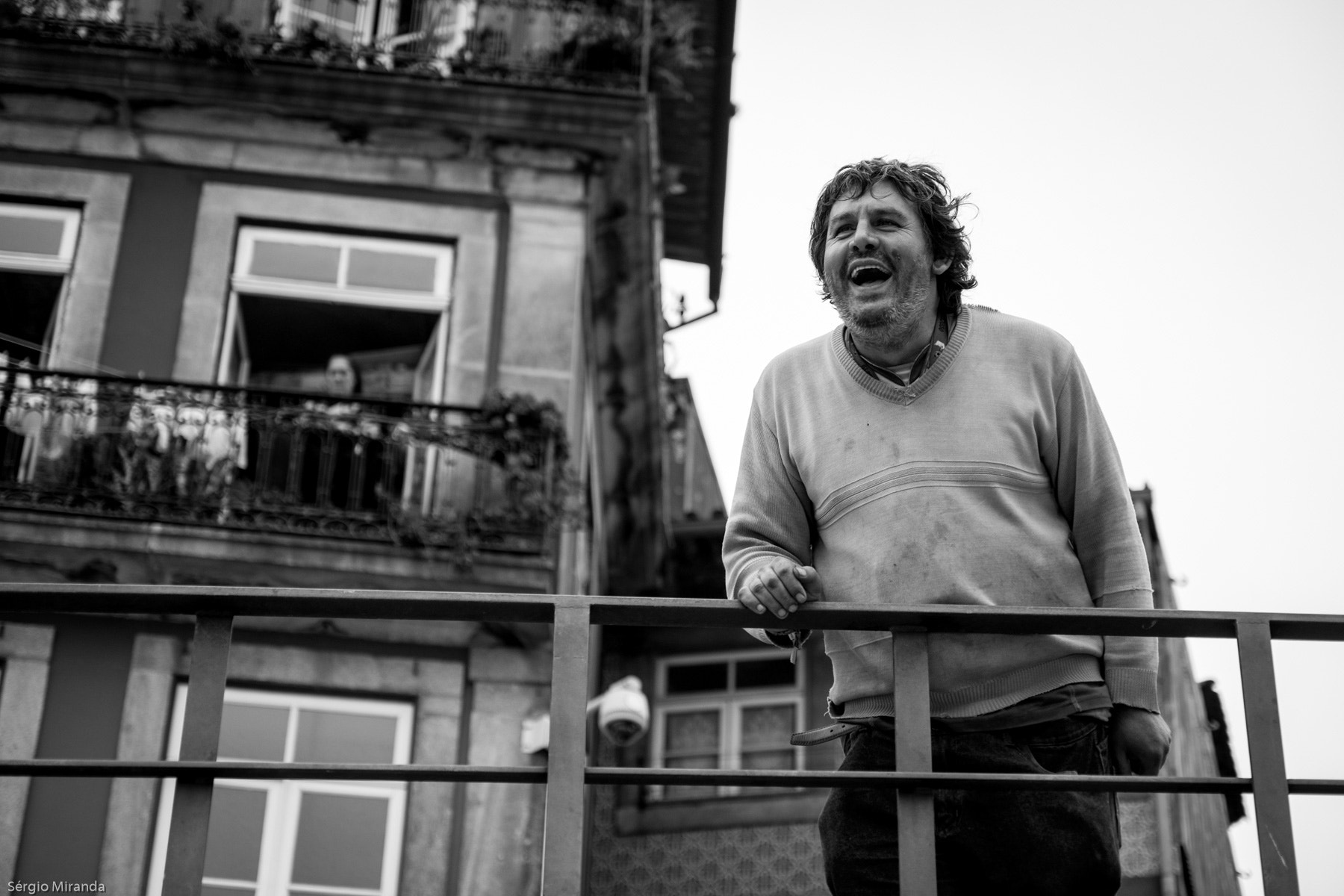
- Emplastro in 2015
- Born: Fernando Jorge da Silva dos Santos; 25 April 1971 (age 54); Madalena, Vila Nova de Gaia, Portugal
- Occupation: Videobombing
- Years active: 1990s–present
- Known for: Videobombing TV reporters

Fernando Jorge da Silva dos Santos (born 25 April 1971), commonly known by the nickname Emplastro (Portuguese pronunciation: [ẽ'plaʃtɾu]; "poultice"), is a Portuguese football fan who became a public figure for videobombing television reporters by staying close behind them.

== Early life and rise to fame ==
Born in Madalena, Vila Nova de Gaia, into a poor family, Santos, along with his four siblings, became orphans when he was still a child. Due to his mental development difficulties, Santos was accompanied by Gaia's CERCI since he was eight years old, and after leaving the cooperative, he worked at Panificadora Coelho in Vilar do Paraíso, Gaia, for fifteen years. After leaving that job for disability, he began to dedicate himself to his passion for football.

His fame in the world of football began in the early 1990s when he started to appear behind television reporters, or on stadium stands covered by TV cameras, whenever there was a big football match or another major media event. He also popularized himself for the saying "My father is Pinto da Costa and my mother is Vítor Baía". A supporter of FC Porto, he is a member of at least four other clubs (Boavista, Leça, Académica, and Rio Ave) as a result of the friendships he has made.

Therefore, Santos has found a way of subsistence, since the fame he gained allows him to ask for some money in exchange of photos or videos taken with other football fans. Some supporters' groups began to adopt him as a mascot, and they are responsible for transporting him to sporting events, thus making amusing stories multiply. Moreover, his popularity guarantees him many appearances in stadiums and other events, where he shows his attraction for cameras.

Santos' prominence got him invited to television shows such as Herman SIC, after which Herman José offered him a denture, graciously shown by Santos. He also appeared on an episode of MTV's show Ridiculousness, which showed the unusual moment when SIC reporter Miguel Guerreiro handed him the microphone and reversed roles, placing himself in the position of "Emplastro".

== See also ==
- Gabriele Paolini
