= Gabriele Paolini =

Italian television personality

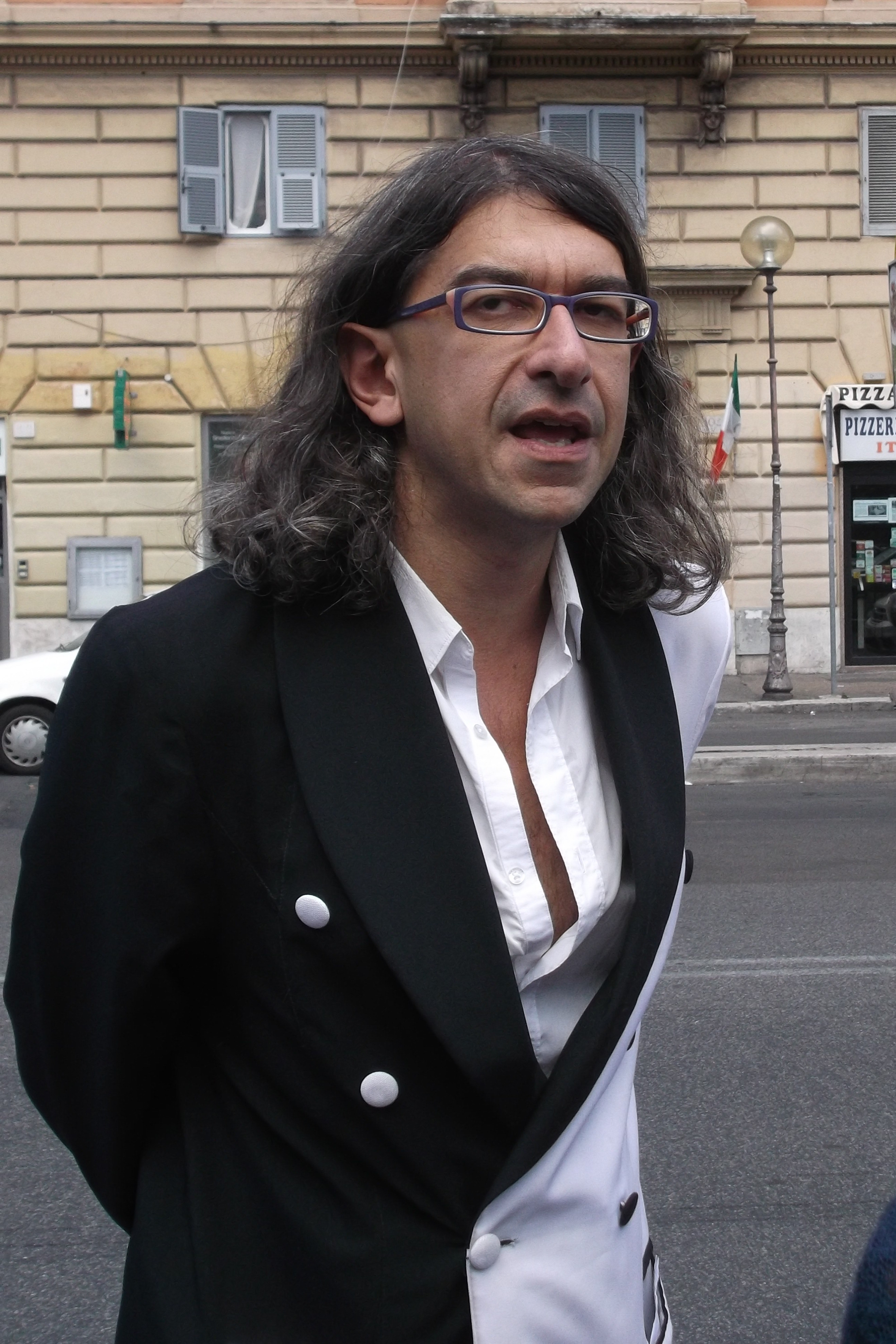
- Paolini in Rome, 2015
- Born: 12 October 1974 (age 51); Milan, Italy
- Occupation: Television prankster
- Years active: 1996–present
- Height: 1.83 m (6 ft 0 in)
- Website: gabrielepaolini.com

Gabriele Paolini (born 12 October 1974, in Milan) is an Italian television prankster, condom advocate, and convicted sex offender. He calls himself the "prophet of the condom" and "the prophylactic prophet". In Italy he is also referred as a disturbatore televisivo, which means videobomber. His antics usually involve exhibiting condoms in the background behind interviews or other unwitting live reporters. He has also been involved with singing contests and sporting events.

== Overview ==
Gabriele Paolini began his career as a "television polluter" when a friend of his died of AIDS at age 22, contracting the disease some years before as a result of unprotected sex with a prostitute. Paolini's reaction was to invade TV news reports wearing or waving chains of condoms. Sometimes Paolini also uses a photo of a politician or of the Pope.

He is the son of a retired general and a singer.

Paolini is in the Guinness Book of Records for his more than 30,000 very short appearances, in which he frequently hijacks the transmission to promote condom use and wave over the shoulders of TV journalists.

Over the years, Paolini has angered many in the media. During one interrupted TV report, journalist Paolo Frajese kicked Paolini away and then resumed his report as if nothing had happened. Journalists have asked the legal office of RAI TV in Saxa Rubra for a legal injunction to "eliminate the disturber". In response, Gabriele Paolini showed the media a list of interviewers who had in fact requested his presence. However, Italy's Supreme Court upheld a three-month suspended sentence against him. TG5 editor-in-chief Salvo Sottile and communications expert Enrico Mieli launched a petition on Facebook to "abolish" Paolini from Italian television due to his insensitivity.

On March 5, 1995, Paolini personally disguised a condom as a request in a paper and gave it to Pope John Paul II at a church in Rome.

In 2008, Paolini was sentenced to a 5-month prison term for offenses against the Pope, stemming from his actions in 2005 when he interrupted a live TV show of RAI TV insulting the Pope and the Italian premier.

Suffering from bipolar disorder and severe paraphilias, he has dedicated himself to prostitution since he was a minor. On November 11, 2013, Paolini was arrested in Rome for underage prostitution and possession of Child Sexual Abuse Material. He was jailed from June 2021 until October 2024, when he ended his sentence.

== See also ==
- Emplastro
