= Fuck her right in the pussy =

Internet meme

"Fuck her right in the pussy" (FHRITP) is a catchphrase that was popularized by several viral videos posted online in 2014. The videos portrayed fictitious bloopers from television newscasts that involved the phrase; the original video focused on a news reporter using the phrase while unaware he was on the air, followed by videos portraying alleged videobombing incidents involving the eponymous phrase on multiple Cincinnati television stations by a character named "Fred".

The phrase and its associated videos quickly became an Internet meme, and inspired real-life videobombing incidents. John Cain, who created the videos, acknowledged that he had been able to profit off them through the sales of official merchandise carrying the phrase. Media attention to the phrase grew in May 2015, where videobombing incidents surrounding the phrase on newscasts in Toronto, Canada and Calgary, Canada spurred discussion over whether use of the phrase constituted sexual harassment and public humiliation of women.

== History ==
The phrase originated from a hoax video created by YouTube user John Cain in January 2014. The video portrayed a fictitious blooper from a live newscast covering the disappearance of Florence, Kentucky-native Jena Chisholm (who had been safely found in Las Vegas the day prior to filming), which featured a news reporter (played by Cain) on a hot mic, unaware he was on the air, telling his cameraman that he wanted to "fuck her right in the pussy" if she were found.

The video was inspired by videos of bloopers from actual newscasts that had gone viral; Cain had considered the possibility of excluding the phrase from the video, but felt that the juxtaposition of a missing woman with the reporter's sexual desires added to the video's shock value. The video quickly went viral once it was posted to YouTube; Cain believed that the video had "spread faster than the news video of [Chisholm] being found."

In response to the success of the original video, Cain began producing additional videos that surrounded the phrase, portraying fictitious videobombing incidents involving reporters from television stations in Cincinnati, Ohio (all of whom were played by actors). The videos featured a hoodie-wearing man identified as "Fred"; in one video, Fred was depicted interrupting a WLWT reporter during a story surrounding a train derailment, and in another, Fred was seen concluding an eyewitness account of an oil spill during an interview with WKRC-TV with the phrase.

Although seemingly realistic, the media blog Mediaite acknowledged inconsistencies in the videos that affected their authenticity, such as the use of anchors who do not work for the stations in question (including a spliced-in reaction by Fox News Channel anchor Megyn Kelly, who referred to the fake reporter in one of the videos as being Laura Ingle), the subdued reactions by the anchors to Fred's antics, a street sign and restaurant in the background that pinpointed the filming location to Florence—rather than in Cincinnati as implied by the stations portrayed, and that if the videos were authentic, given the age of the actual stories, "some intrepid Reddit user" would have already drawn attention to them. Cain also began to market a line of official merchandise, such as T-shirts, carrying the phrase.

== Impact ==
Following the publishing of the "Fred" videos, "FHRITP" became a wider viral phenomenon. Cain explained that he had earned at least $20,000 in a single month from the sales of FHRITP merchandise, and that he was "completely able to get out of debt, buy a new car, buy a home and relocate to Orlando, Florida, and still have money left over." The videos would inspire a large number of real-life occurrences of people videobombing live news reporters with the phrase—many of whom were unaware that the videos were actually fictitious.

Several incidents involving the phrase garnered media attention. On September 17, 2014, Florida State Seminoles quarterback Jameis Winston was suspended for the first half of Florida State's game against Clemson after "several students tweeted" that Winston had shouted "fuck her right in the pussy" while standing on top of a table in Florida State University's Student Union. Two days later, university president Garnett S. Stokes and athletic director Stan Wilcox, citing results of an "ongoing investigation", announced that Winston would be suspended for the whole game.

In January 2015, Sky Sports News decided to cease broadcasting from sports grounds on transfer deadline day due to a number of examples of the heckle at the previous deadline day in September 2014.

On May 10, 2015, a heckler outside of a Toronto FC Major League Soccer match interrupted a live report by CITY-DT CityNews reporter Shauna Hunt with the phrase. Provoked by the obscene language, Hunt confronted nearby men and asked them about the phrase, which they felt was funny and commonplace. The resulting footage went viral; following the incident, Toronto FC owners Maple Leaf Sports & Entertainment issued a statement reading that the company was "appalled that this trend of disrespectful behaviour would make its way to our city, let alone anywhere near our stadium." MLSE also announced that it intended to ban four individuals from all of its venues for a year. One of the men approached by the journalist was identified as an assistant network management engineer at utility company Hydro One, who had a salary of just over C$107,000; on May 13, 2015, the employee was fired for violating Hydro One's employee code of conduct. In November 2015, the employee was reinstated following third-party arbitration.

In an interview with the Toronto Star, Cain claimed that he had received an e-mail from one of the men interviewed, claiming that the incident was staged. He felt that the station was "doing it the way I would do it if I was trying to ruin FHRITP." However, the station's head of news Dave Budge denied the allegations, stating that the reactions were "spontaneous and genuine", and that "any suggestion to the contrary is absurd." Hunt explained that the video was meant to "shed light on a much bigger issue."

On May 14, 2015, a Calgary man was charged with "stunting" under provincial traffic safety laws following an incident in April, where he had yelled the phrase at CBC News reporter Meghan Grant while driving by her on the city's "Red Mile". The incident occurred, coincidentally, while Grant was filming an interview for a story regarding a campaign against harassment and other lewd behavior on the stretch during the Calgary Flames' NHL playoff games. On May 15, 2015, it was reported that the police in Halifax, Nova Scotia, were willing to consider the laying of charges in future incidents involving male hecklers using the phrase towards women as a form of public humiliation, justifying the actions as being "sexualized violence".

In February 2022, the Star Tribune interviewed a KARE reporter who had been targeted with the phrase on multiple occasions, including at a previous position at a station in Iowa, and by a bystander while recording an interview over videoconference.
