= Notícias da Madalena =

Notícias da Madalena is a free local magazine for and about the parish of Madalena, Vila Nova de Gaia. It is published every four months and aims to inform the population about important events and improvements made to benefit the locals. It is edited by the executive council of the parish, thus also serving as some political promotion of the current council.
