= Jameis Winston =

American football player (born 1994)

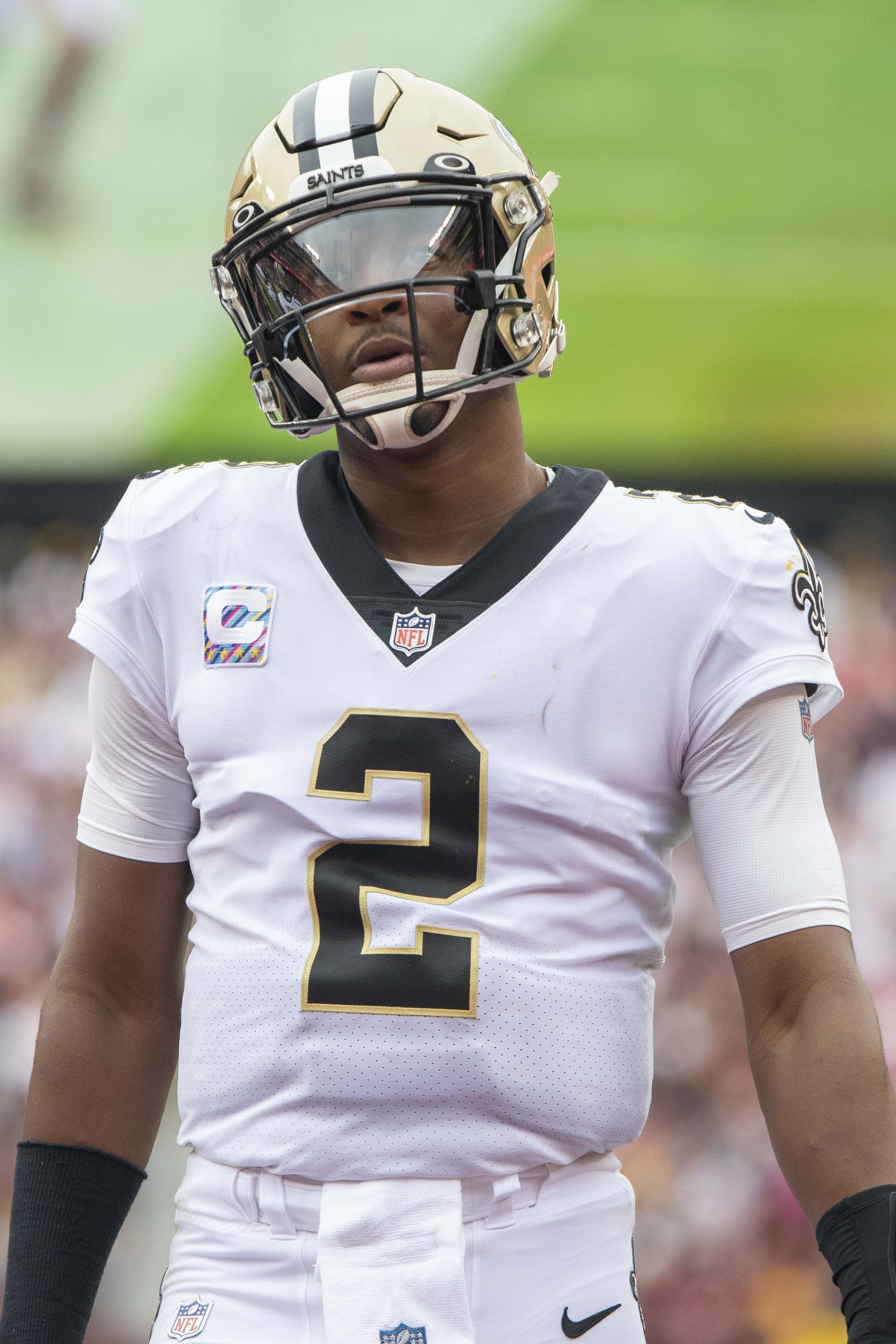
- Winston with the New Orleans Saints in 2021

No. 19 – New York Giants
- Position: Quarterback
- Roster status: Active

Personal information
- Born: January 6, 1994 (age 32); Bessemer, Alabama, U.S.
- Listed height: 6 ft 4 in (1.93 m)
- Listed weight: 231 lb (105 kg)

Career information
- High school: Hueytown
- College: Florida State (2012–2014)
- NFL draft: 2015: 1st round, 1st overall pick

Career history
- Tampa Bay Buccaneers (2015–2019); New Orleans Saints (2020–2023); Cleveland Browns (2024); New York Giants (2025–present)

Awards and highlights
- Pro Bowl (2015); NFL passing yards leader (2019); PFWA All-Rookie Team (2015); BCS national champion (2013); Heisman Trophy (2013)

Career NFL statistics as of Week 10, 2026
- Passing attempts: 3,410
- Passing completions: 2,077
- Completion percentage: 60.9%
- TD–INT: 164–118
- Passing yards: 25,820
- Passer rating: 86.0
- Rushing yards: 1,382
- Rushing touchdowns: 14
- Stats at Pro Football Reference

Jameis Lanaed Winston (/ˈdʒeɪmɪs/ JAY-miss; born January 6, 1994) is an American professional football quarterback for the New York Giants of the National Football League (NFL). Winston played college football for the Florida State Seminoles, where he became the youngest player ever to win the Heisman Trophy and led his team to victory in the 2014 BCS National Championship Game during his freshman year in 2013. He was selected first overall by the Tampa Bay Buccaneers in the 2015 NFL draft.

Winston set several franchise rookie records for the Buccaneers, earning him Pro Bowl honors. He led the league in passing yards in 2019, but also led the league in interceptions and set the NFL season record for interceptions returned for touchdowns that season. He was unable to reach the playoffs with Tampa Bay. After his rookie contract with the Buccaneers expired, Winston played for the New Orleans Saints and Cleveland Browns, alternating as a starter and backup, before joining the Giants in 2025.

== Early life ==
Winston was born in Bessemer, Alabama, on January 6, 1994. He attended Hueytown High School, where he played both football and baseball. Winston was considered the best dual-threat quarterback recruit in the nation by Rivals.com, and the best overall quarterback recruit by ESPN. Winston was also named the MVP of the ESPN RISE Elite 11 quarterback camp. Additionally, Winston earned the Gatorade Player of the Year recognition for the state of Alabama.

Winston committed to attend Florida State University on February 3, 2012. The Texas Rangers selected Winston in the 15th round of the 2012 Major League Baseball draft out of high school. Though the Rangers proposed allowing him to play for the Florida State Seminoles football team while working out with their baseball organization, Winston decided not to sign.

== College career ==
=== Football ===
==== 2012 season ====
Winston redshirted during the 2012 college football season behind senior quarterback EJ Manuel.

==== 2013 season ====
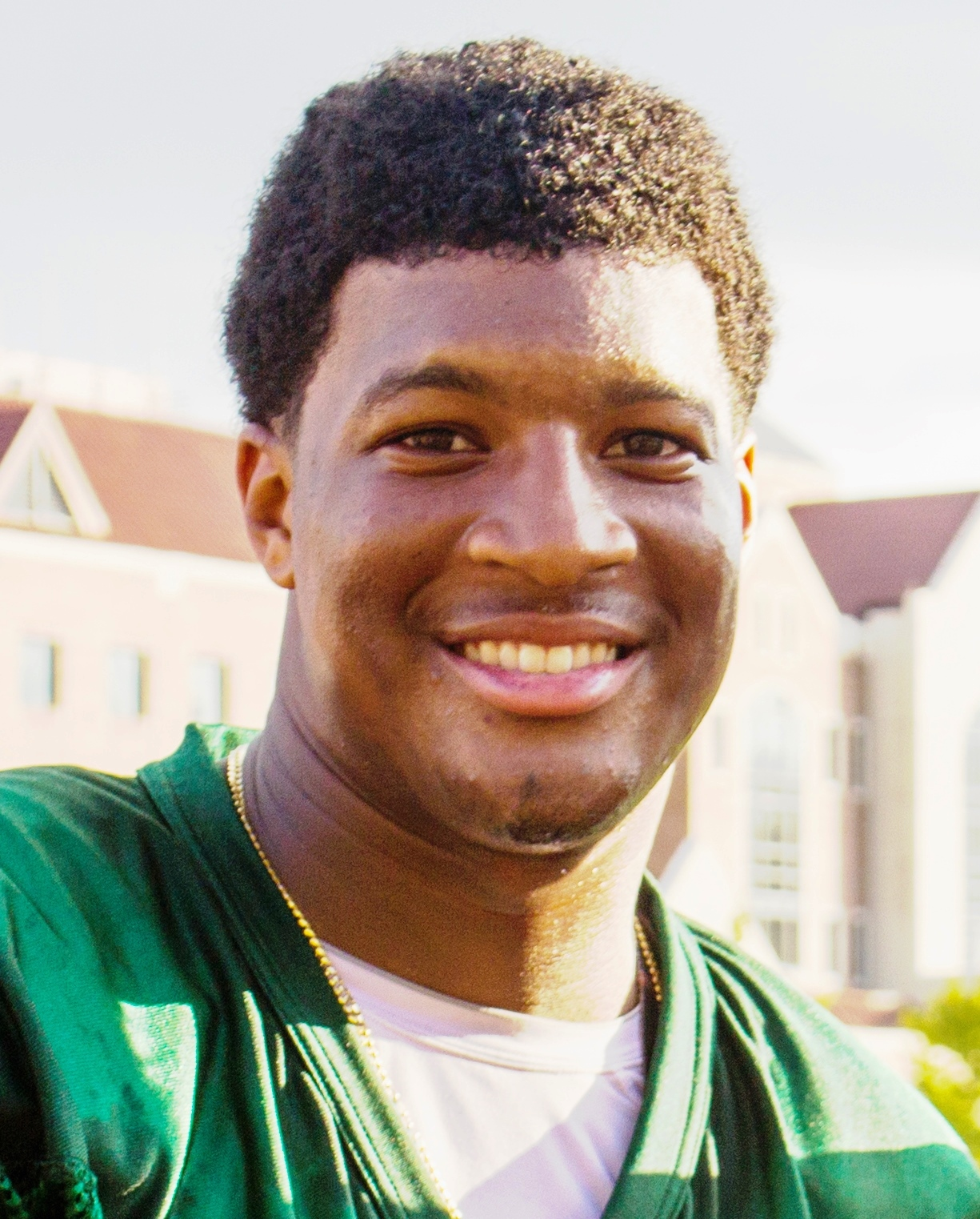
Winston in 2013

Prior to the 2013 season, Winston was named Florida State's starting quarterback. In his college debut, he completed 25 of 27 passes with four passing touchdowns along with a rushing touchdown in a 41–17 victory over the University of Pittsburgh.

Winston helped lead the team to an undefeated 13–0 regular season record, including a 45–7 victory in the Atlantic Coast Conference (ACC) Championship against Duke.

For his successes in 2013, Winston earned numerous accolades. He was named the 2013 ACC Offensive Player of the Year and ACC Player of the Year to go along with winning the Associated Press College Football Player of the Year, Davey O'Brien Award, Manning Award, Walter Camp Player of the Year Award, as well as the nickname "Famous Jameis". In addition, he was named as a consensus All-American. Most notably, he won the Heisman Trophy on December 14, 2013, beating out quarterbacks A. J. McCarron, Jordan Lynch, and Johnny Manziel, the previous winner, as well as running backs Tre Mason and Andre Williams. He became the second freshman to win the award, after Manziel won the previous year. He also became the youngest to win the award, at 19 years and 342 days.

On January 6, 2014, Winston's 20th birthday, Florida State defeated Auburn 34–31 in the 2014 BCS National Championship Game. Winston was named the Offensive MVP of the game after passing for 235 yards with two touchdowns, including the game-winning touchdown pass to Kelvin Benjamin with 13 seconds left. Winston finished his freshman season with a conference-leading 4,057 passing yards and 40 passing touchdowns, which set an ACC record and a Division I FBS freshman record, and his 184.8 passer rating led the NCAA.

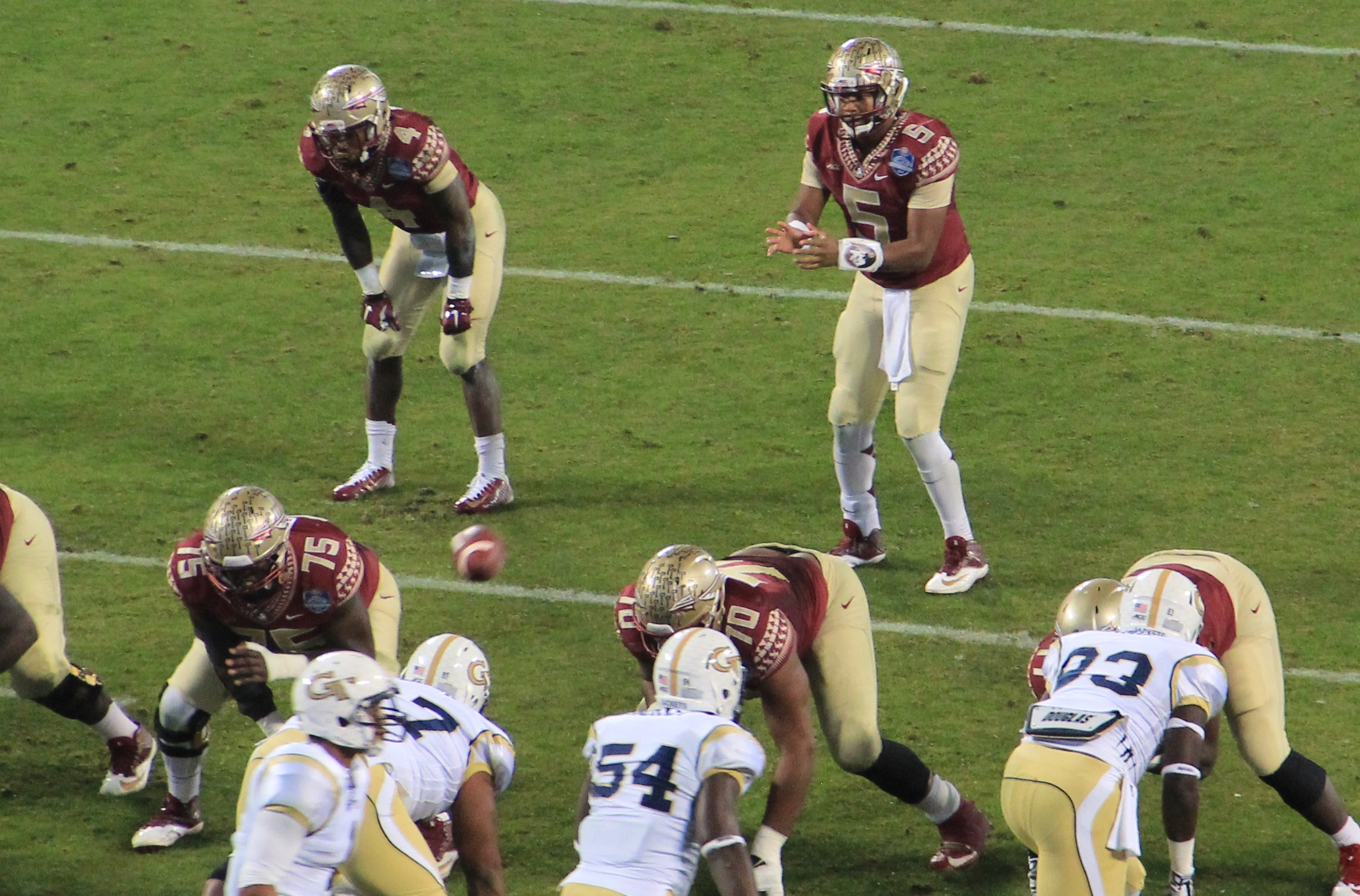
Winston receiving a snap in the 2014 ACC Championship

==== 2014 season ====
Winston started 13 games his redshirt sophomore season. He did not play in one game due to suspension. After a 13–0 regular season, the Seminoles were selected to play in the 2015 Rose Bowl, a semifinal game in the College Football Playoff, against Oregon. Oregon would win the game by a score of 59–20, giving Winston his only loss as a starter during his college career. Winston finished the season with a conference-leading 3,907 passing yards and 25 touchdowns. He finished in sixth place in the Heisman Trophy voting in 2014.

After the season, Winston decided to forgo the remaining two years of eligibility and enter the 2015 NFL draft. He finished his career 26–1 as a starter and completed 562 of 851 passes for 7,964 yards, 65 touchdowns, and 28 interceptions.

=== Baseball ===
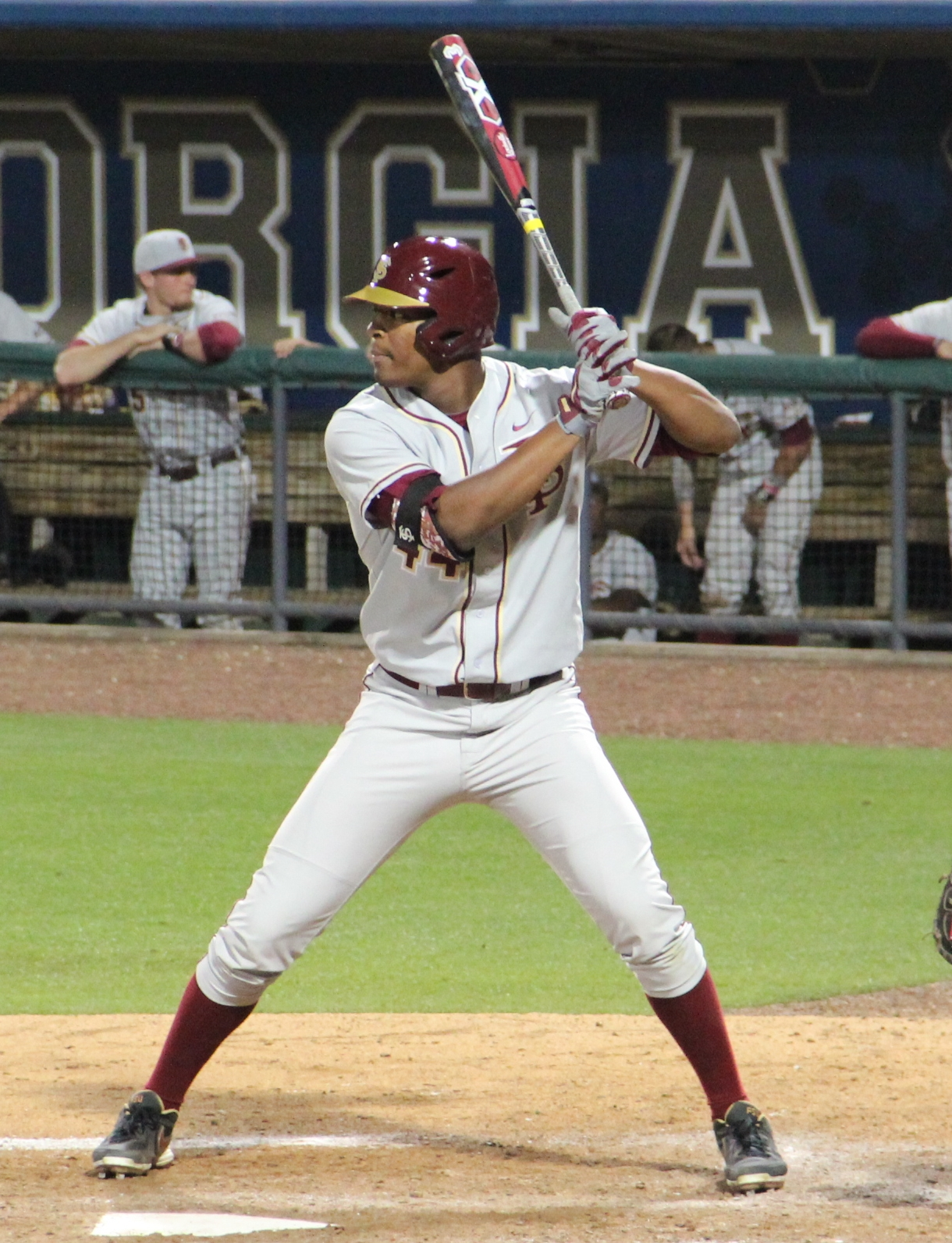
Winston at Russ Chandler Stadium, 2014

Winston chose Florida State in part because he was allowed to play for the Florida State Seminoles baseball team in addition to football. A switch-hitting batter and a right-handed thrower, he played as an outfielder and a pitcher as a freshman in 2013. He batted .235 with a .723 on-base plus slugging in 119 at-bats and had a 3.00 earned run average in 27 innings pitched. Prior to the 2014 season, Winston was named a preseason All-American by Baseball America as a 3rd-team utility player.

== Professional career ==
Pre-draft measurables
Height	Weight	Arm length	Hand span	Wingspan	40-yard dash	10-yard split	20-yard split	20-yard shuttle	Three-cone drill	Vertical jump	Broad jump	Wonderlic
6 ft 3 3/4 in (1.92 m)	231 lb (105 kg)	32 in (0.81 m)	9 3/8 in (0.24 m)	6 ft 6 3/4 in (2.00 m)	4.97 s	1.74 s	2.89 s	4.36 s	7.16 s	28.5 in (0.72 m)	8 ft 7 in (2.62 m)	27
All values from NFL Combine except the Wonderlic

=== Tampa Bay Buccaneers ===
==== 2015 season ====
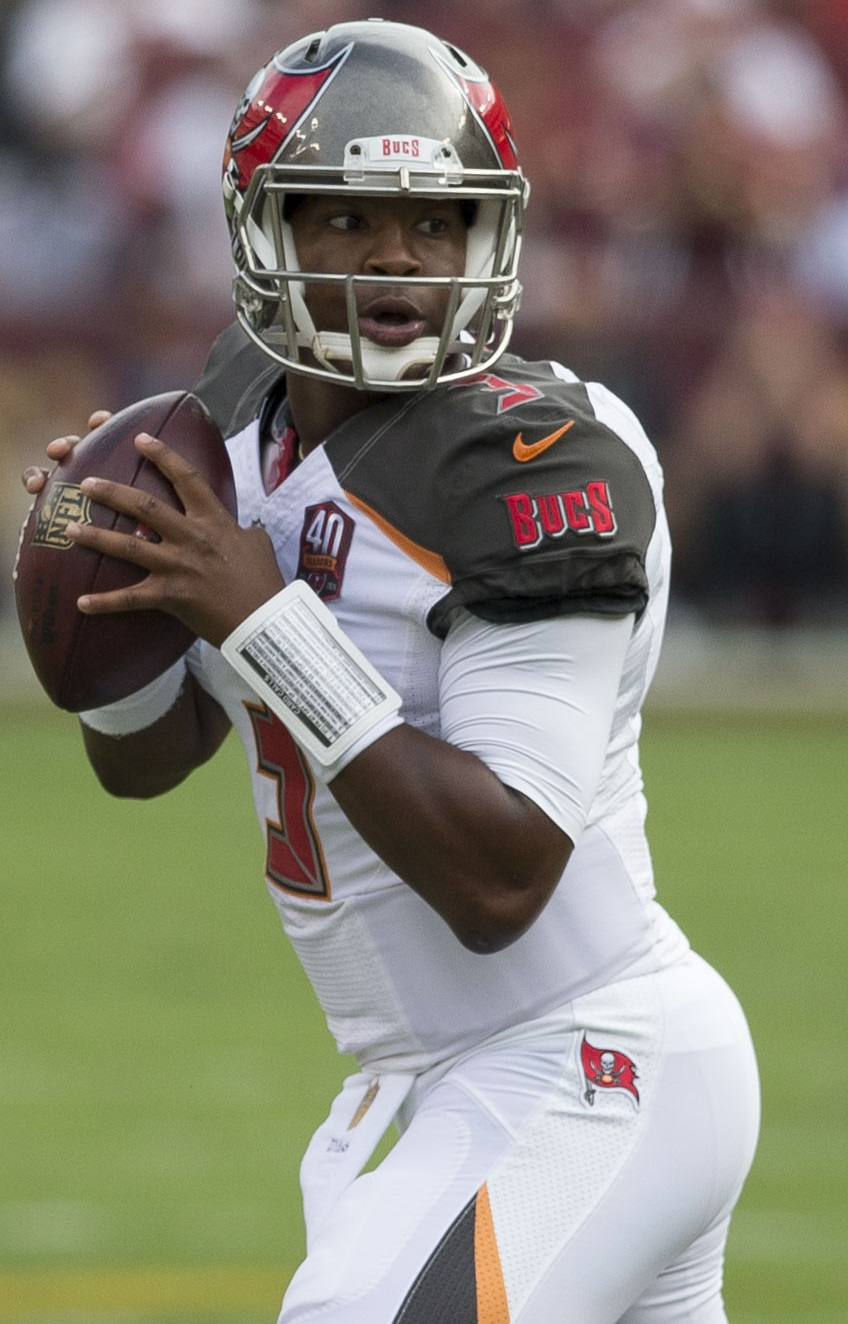
Winston in his rookie season

The Tampa Bay Buccaneers took Winston first overall in the 2015 NFL draft. On May 1, 2015, Winston signed a four-year, $23.35 million contract with the Buccaneers, with a $16.7 million signing bonus. The contract prevented him from playing any other sport than football.

Winston played his first regular season game against the Tennessee Titans that featured fellow first rounder, Marcus Mariota. In the 42–14 loss, his first pass was intercepted and returned for a touchdown by Coty Sensabaugh. Winston's interception was the first time a rookie's first pass was returned for a touchdown since Brett Favre in 1991.

On November 22, 2015, against the Philadelphia Eagles, Winston tied an NFL rookie and Buccaneers franchise record with five touchdown passes.

Winston set franchise rookie records in pass attempts, pass completions, passing yards, and passing touchdowns. Winston finished his rookie season with 4,042 passing yards, finishing 23 yards short of the franchise record set by Josh Freeman in 2012. Winston also became the third rookie quarterback to pass over 4,000 yards in a season. He was named to the NFL All-Rookie Team for his 2015 season, becoming the fourth Buccaneers quarterback to receive this award, joining Tom Owen (1974), Doug Williams (1978), and Mike Glennon (2013).

New England Patriots quarterback Tom Brady elected not to participate in the 2016 Pro Bowl following his team's loss in the AFC Championship game; as a result, Winston was selected to his first Pro Bowl game making him the first rookie quarterback in Buccaneers' history to be selected. (Note: From 2014 to 2016, the Pro Bowl did not use the traditional AFC vs. NFC format, going instead with an "unconferenced" setup where two legendary players picked teams school-yard or fantasy style.)

==== 2016 season ====
Winston's second season in the NFL began with an impressive performance against the Atlanta Falcons at the Georgia Dome, in which he completed over 70% of his throws for 281 yards and four touchdown passes in a 31–24 victory. He earned National Football Conference (NFC) Offensive Player of the Week for his performance against the Falcons. Following Week 1, the Buccaneers began to struggle through injuries, inconsistent play, and offensive turnovers till mid-season, at which point the team was 3–5 and had experienced blowout losses to the Arizona Cardinals, Denver Broncos, and Atlanta Falcons – a three-game losing streak. Following the loss to the Falcons, the Winston-led Buccaneers began playing efficient offense as well as exceptional defense and special teams play, resulting in the Buccaneers' first five-game winning streak since their Super Bowl-winning season. The win streak gave the Buccaneers possession of the 6th seed in the NFC playoff race, which they quickly lost after back-to-back losses to the Dallas Cowboys and New Orleans Saints. Winston led the Buccaneers to their first winning season in six years after defeating the Carolina Panthers in the regular-season finale, during which he broke the franchise records for passing yards and passing touchdowns in a season and became the first quarterback in NFL history to start his career with consecutive seasons of 4,000 yards passing. However, the Buccaneers were eliminated from playoff contention via a tiebreaker with the Detroit Lions. He was ranked 57th by his peers on the NFL Top 100 Players of 2017.

==== 2017 season ====
During Week 6 against the Cardinals, Winston left the game with an apparent right shoulder injury. The next day, October 16, Winston suffered a sprained AC joint in his right shoulder, but he stated that he could play through it. During Week 9's loss to the Saints, Winston was taken out of the game with the same shoulder injury. Head coach Dirk Koetter announced the next day that he would miss at least two weeks to rest his shoulder. While on the sideline, Winston initiated an altercation with Saints rookie Marshon Lattimore, while being assisted by teammate Mike Evans, for which Winston was fined $12,154. In the game, Winston became the second-youngest player in NFL history to reach 10,000 career passing yards, four days older than record holder Drew Bledsoe. He missed the next three games due to injury and returned in Week 13. Overall, Winston and Buccaneers struggled to a 5–11 record. Winston finished the 2017 season with 3,504 passing yards, 19 touchdowns, and 11 interceptions.

==== 2018 season ====
On April 17, 2018, the Buccaneers picked up the fifth-year option on Winston's contract. On June 21, the NFL announced that he would be suspended for violating the league's personal conduct policy, regarding his latest incident where he allegedly groped a female Uber driver. On June 28, the announcement was made official, giving Winston a three-game suspension to begin the 2018 season.

After missing the first three games due to the suspension, Winston returned in Week 4 against the Chicago Bears, but did not start. He replaced Ryan Fitzpatrick in the third quarter, finishing with 145 passing yards, a touchdown, and two interceptions as the Buccaneers lost 10–48. In Week 6, against the Falcons, he had 395 passing yards, four touchdowns, and two interceptions in the 34–29 loss. In Week 8 against the Cincinnati Bengals, Winston threw for 276 yards, one touchdown, and four interceptions and he was benched in the third quarter for Fitzpatrick. During Week 11 against the New York Giants, Fitzpatrick threw three interceptions and was benched for Winston in the second half. Winston threw for 199 yards, two touchdowns, and an interception as the Buccaneers lost 38–35. Two weeks later, in a 24–17 win over the Panthers, Winston completed 20 of 30 passing attempts for 249 yards and two touchdowns, breaking the franchise record for passing touchdowns in a career with 81. Three weeks later, in a 27–20 loss to the Cowboys, Winston completed 34 of 48 passing attempts for 336 yards and one touchdown, breaking the franchise record for completions in a career previously held by Josh Freeman. Overall, he finished the 2018 season with 2,992 passing yards, 19 touchdowns, and 14 interceptions.

==== 2019 season ====
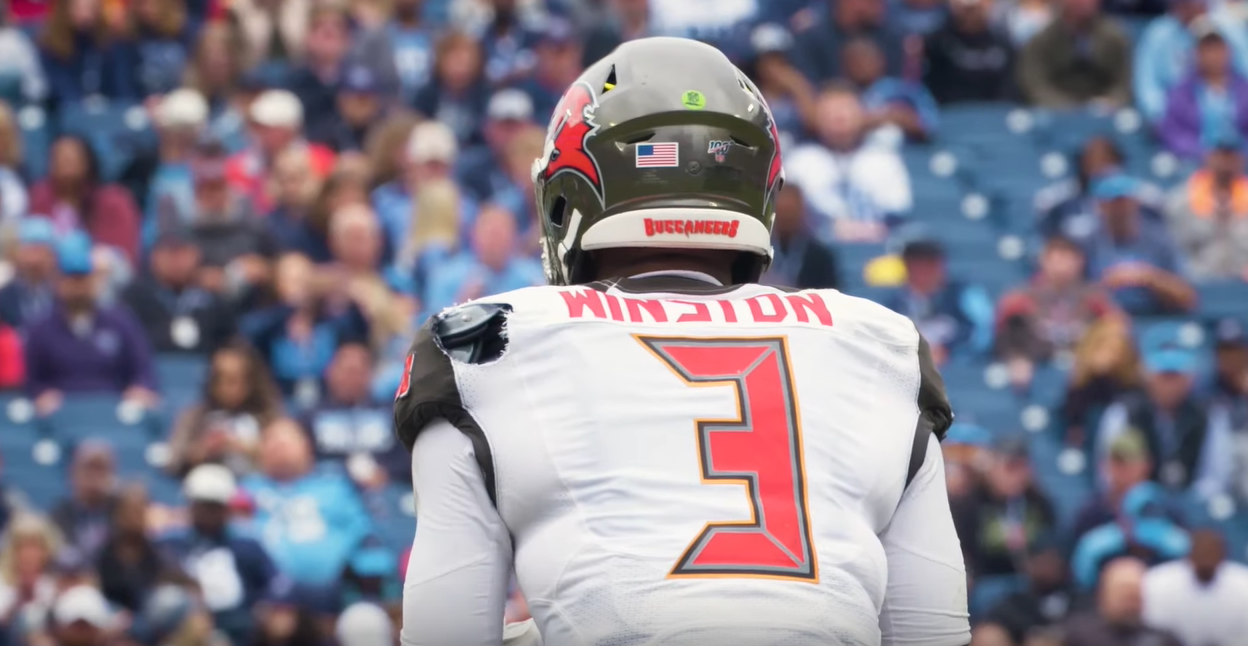
Winston in a game against the Tennessee Titans

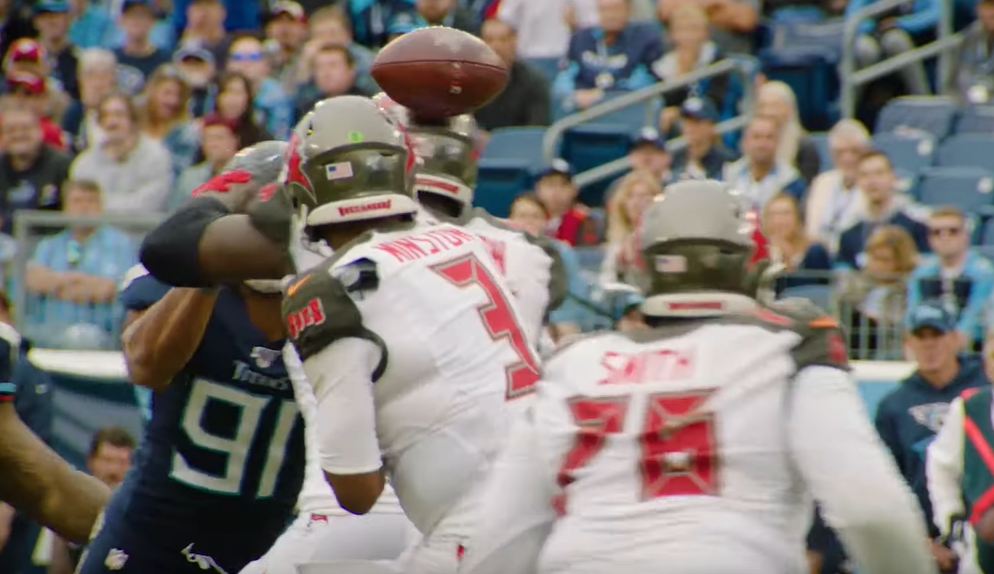
Winston committing one of his 35 turnovers during the 2019 season

Prior to the start of the season, head coach Dirk Koetter was fired and replaced by former Cardinals head coach Bruce Arians. In Week 1, during a 31–17 loss to the San Francisco 49ers, Winston broke the Buccaneers franchise record for passing yards in a career previously held by Vinny Testaverde but finished with 194 passing yards, one touchdown, and three interceptions, two of which were returned for touchdowns. Following a lackluster first two weeks of the 2019 season, during a 32–31 loss to the Giants in Week 3, Winston passed for 380 yards, three touchdowns, and one interception. The following week, Winston passed for 385 yards, four touchdowns, and an interception in a 55–40 win over the Los Angeles Rams. As a result of his performance, Winston was named NFC Offensive Player of the Week.

During Week 6 against the Panthers at Tottenham Hotspur Stadium, Winston became the first quarterback in Buccaneers franchise history to pass for 100 touchdowns in a career, but finished with 400 passing yards, one touchdown, a lost fumble, and a career-high five interceptions as the Buccaneers lost 37–26. Two weeks later, in a 27–23 loss to the Titans, Winston broke another Buccaneers franchise record, previously held by Testaverde, for career passing attempts, but finished with 301 yards, two touchdowns, two interceptions, and two lost fumbles. The following week, in a 40–34 overtime loss to the Seattle Seahawks, Winston passed for 335 yards, two touchdowns, and lost a fumble. In Week 10, during a 30–27 victory over the Cardinals, he had 358 passing yards, one touchdown, and two interceptions. In the next against the Saints, Winston threw for 313 yards, two touchdowns, and four interceptions, one of which was returned for a touchdown, as the Buccaneers lost 34–17. In Week 12, during a 35–22 win against the Falcons, Winston passed for 313 yards, three touchdowns, and two interceptions. During Week 14 against the Indianapolis Colts, Winston finished with a then career-best 456 passing yards, five rushing yards, five total touchdowns, and three interceptions as the Buccaneers won 38–35. As a result of his performance, Winston broke the Buccaneers' single-season franchise record for passing yards that he set in 2016, becoming the first quarterback in franchise history to pass for over 4,100 yards in a season.

In Week 15, during a 38–17 win over the Lions, Winston finished with a career-best 458 passing yards, four rushing yards, four touchdowns, and one interception as he both became the first quarterback in NFL history to have consecutive games of 450 passing yards and broke the franchise record for passing touchdowns in a single season that he set in 2016, becoming the first quarterback in franchise history to throw 30 passing touchdowns in a single season. In Week 16, during a 23–20 loss to the Houston Texans, Winston threw for 335 yards, one touchdown, and four interceptions with one returned for a touchdown. In Week 17, during a 28–22 overtime loss to the Falcons, Winston threw for 201 yards, two touchdowns, and two interceptions including a game-ending one that was returned for a touchdown by linebacker Deion Jones. As a result, Winston became the eighth quarterback in NFL history to throw for 5,000 yards in a single season, the first Buccaneers quarterback to throw for 5,000 yards in a single season, and the first quarterback in NFL history to throw at least 30 touchdowns and 30 interceptions in a single season.

Winston finished his fifth year setting new career highs, leading the league in passing yards, completions, and attempts to go along with new career highs in passing touchdowns but also leading the league in interceptions and total turnovers. He finished with 5,109 passing yards, 33 passing touchdowns, one rushing touchdown, 30 interceptions, and five lost fumbles. Winston's seven interceptions returned for touchdowns set an NFL record, and his 84.3 passer rating ranked 27th among starters. Winston was also recognized for having his first and last pass as a Buccaneer returned for touchdowns.

On February 28, 2020, it was revealed that Winston underwent surgery to repair a torn meniscus. It was also revealed that Winston had LASIK surgery. Furthermore, he was dealing with the knee injury and a broken thumb for the entire 2019 season.

Winston was not re-signed by the Buccaneers in the offseason, as they opted to replace him with longtime New England Patriots quarterback Tom Brady. Head coach Bruce Arians, while critical of Winston's frequent turnovers, nonetheless enjoyed their working relationship during their only season together, so Arians phoned up other teams to see if they would take Winston.

=== New Orleans Saints ===
==== 2020 season ====
On April 28, 2020, Winston signed a one-year contract with the Saints. His contract had a value of $1.1 million including his base salary of $952,000 and a signing bonus of $148,000 with a possible $3.4 million in incentives.

Winston made his first appearance of the 2020 season in Week 9 against his former team the Buccaneers on Sunday Night Football in relief of Drew Brees. Winston passed for 12 yards as the Saints beat the Bucs 38–3. In Week 10 against the 49ers, Winston came in the second half after Brees left the game with a rib injury. Winston completed 6 of 10 passes for 63 yards as the Saints won 27–13. He was placed on the reserve/COVID-19 list by the team on December 20, 2020, and activated four days later.

In the Divisional Round of the playoffs against the Tampa Bay Buccaneers, Winston’s only appearance in the game was when he went into the lineup for a trick play and threw a 56-yard touchdown pass to Tre'Quan Smith during the 30–20 loss. The Buccaneers would eventually win Super Bowl LV.

==== 2021 season ====
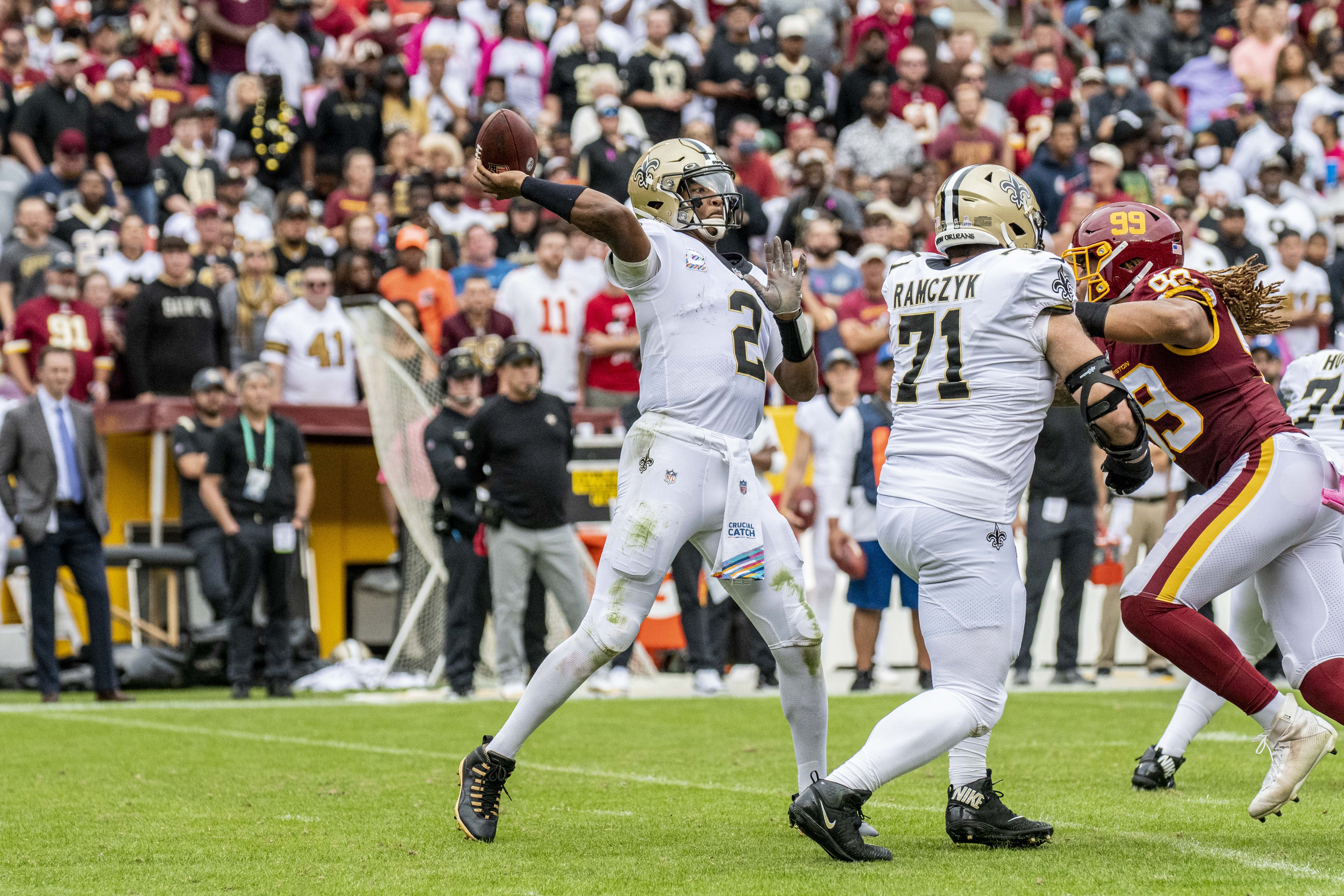
Winston playing against the Washington Football Team in 2021.

On March 15, 2021, the day after Drew Brees announced his retirement, Winston re-signed with the Saints on a one-year deal worth $12 million. On August 27, 2021, Winston was named the starting quarterback for the Saints over Taysom Hill. Making his first start for the Saints against the Green Bay Packers, Winston threw for 147 yards and five touchdowns as the Saints won 38–3. The following week against the Panthers, with multiple starters injured and seven coaches sidelined due to COVID-19, Winston threw for 111 yards and 2 interceptions with no touchdowns in the 26–7 loss. During Week 5 against the Washington Football Team, Winston and the Saints overcame two early turnovers to beat Washington 33–22, while throwing for 279 yards, four touchdowns, and one interception, along with a fumble.

In Week 8 against the Buccaneers, Winston had to leave the game in the second quarter due to a knee injury after being horse-collar tackled by Tampa Bay linebacker Devin White. He would be replaced by Trevor Siemian, who went on to win the game, 36–27. The next day, it was revealed that Winston had suffered a torn ACL and had MCL damage, ending his season.

==== 2022 season ====
On March 21, 2022, Winston signed a two-year, $28 million contract extension with the Saints. On September 18, it was reported that Winston suffered four fractures in his back in Week 1. Winston played the first three games before being inactive in Weeks 4 and 5. After returning, Winston was named the second-string quarterback behind veteran Andy Dalton.

==== 2023 season ====
On March 14, 2023, Winston re-signed with the Saints. He appeared in seven games but only contributed significantly in two in the 2023 season. He passed for two touchdowns and three interceptions on the season.

=== Cleveland Browns ===
On March 20, 2024, Winston signed a one-year deal with the Cleveland Browns.

After starting quarterback Deshaun Watson was ruled out for the season with an Achilles tear on October 20, Winston took over as the starter beginning in Week 8. In his first start, Winston threw for 334 yards, three touchdowns, and zero interceptions, including a go-ahead touchdown with under a minute left as he led Cleveland to a 29–24 upset victory over the Baltimore Ravens. In Week 11 against the Saints, Winston threw for 395 yards and two touchdowns, including a career-long 89-yard touchdown pass to Jerry Jeudy as the Browns lost 35–14. The following week against the Pittsburgh Steelers, Winston scrambled for a two-yard touchdown to give Cleveland a 12-point lead in snowy conditions. The Browns squandered that lead after a pair of turnovers from Winston in the fourth quarter, but he rallied Cleveland to a game-winning drive with under a minute left to win 24–19.

In Week 13 against the Denver Broncos, Winston set a Browns single-game record with 497 passing yards and four touchdowns, but his three interceptions, including two returned for touchdowns, doomed the Browns as they lost 41–32. Winston was replaced by Dorian Thompson-Robinson late in the second half of the Browns' Week 15 game against the Kansas City Chiefs after throwing three interceptions in a 21–7 loss. On December 17, head coach Kevin Stefanski announced that Thompson-Robinson would be the starter in Week 16's matchup against the Cincinnati Bengals. Prior to his benching, Winston threw for 2,121 yards with 13 touchdowns and 12 picks. Eight of his interceptions occurred over his last three games, all losses.

=== New York Giants ===
On March 31, 2025, Winston signed a two-year, $8 million deal with the New York Giants. Prior to the start of the Giants opening regular season game, Winston was named as the third-string quarterback behind starter Russell Wilson and rookie Jaxson Dart.

On November 12, Winston was named the starting quarterback for the Giants' Week 11 matchup against the Green Bay Packers after Dart had suffered a concussion and Wilson was demoted to third string. In his first start in 11 months, Winston completed 19 of 29 passes for 201 yards and threw one interception. He also rushed for a 3 yard touchdown on a quarterback sneak in the fourth quarter to give the Giants a 20–19 lead, but the Packers scored a touchdown on the next drive. Winston threw his lone interception with 36 seconds left in the game, and while the Giants defense forced a punt, he was then stripped-sacked by Micah Parsons for the final play of the game and Packers CB Keisean Nixon recovered the fumble as the Giants lost the game by the score of 27–20. The following week against the Detroit Lions, Winston made 18 of 36 passes for 366 yards, including two touchdowns and one interception, while rushing 4 times for 13 yards. He also caught a 33 yard touchdown pass from teammate Gunner Olszewski on a trick play, making this Winston’s first receiving touchdown of his career. Ultimately, the Giants lost in overtime 34–27 after he was sacked on fourth down.

On September 6, 2026, the Giants signed Winston to a two-year, $13 million contract extension. After Dart suffered a season-ending injury, Winston took over starting Week 3 against the Tennessee Titans. He was replaced by newly-acquired J. J. McCarthy during a Week 6 loss to the Saints, after which McCarthy became the new starter. In Week 9 against the Eagles, McCarthy briefly exited with a hip injury, during which Winston led a scoring drive that culminated in a five-yard touchdown to Isaiah Likely that gave the Giants the lead; McCarthy returned to the game afterward to seal the Giants' 19–11 win.

== Career statistics ==
Legend
	Led the league
**Bold**	Career high

=== NFL ===
Regular season statistics
Year	Team	Games			Passing									Rushing					Sacks		Fumbles	
Year	Team	GP	GS	Record	Cmp	Att	Pct	Yds	Y/A	Lng	TD	Int	Rtg	Att	Yds	Avg	Lng	TD	Sck	SckY	Fum	Lost
2015	TB	16	16	6–10	312	535	58.3	4,042	7.6	68	22	15	84.2	54	213	3.9	21	**6**	27	190	6	2
2016	TB	16	16	**9–7**	345	567	60.8	4,090	7.2	45	28	18	86.1	53	165	3.1	14	1	35	239	10	6
2017	TB	13	13	3–10	282	442	63.8	3,504	7.9	70	19	11	92.2	33	135	4.1	17	1	33	207	**15**	**7**
2018	TB	11	9	3–6	244	378	**64.6**	2,992	7.9	64	19	14	90.2	49	**281**	**5.7**	18	1	27	157	7	3
2019	TB	16	16	7–9	**380**	**626**	60.7	**5,109**	8.2	71	**33**	**30**	84.3	**59**	250	4.2	**26**	1	**47**	**282**	12	5
2020	NO	4	0	—	7	11	63.6	75	6.8	19	0	0	83.5	8	−6	−0.8	3	0	2	11	0	0
2021	NO	7	7	5–2	95	161	59.0	1,170	7.3	72	14	3	**102.8**	32	166	5.2	20	1	11	69	2	1
2022	NO	3	3	1–2	73	115	63.5	858	7.5	51	4	5	79.5	5	16	3.2	6	0	11	74	3	0
2023	NO	7	0	—	25	47	53.2	264	5.6	30	2	3	57.4	5	−6	−1.2	−1	0	2	13	0	0
2024	CLE	12	7	2–5	181	296	61.1	2,121	7.2	**89**	13	12	80.6	25	83	3.3	13	1	24	130	5	2
2025	NYG	3	2	0–2	37	66	56.1	567	**8.6**	42	2	2	82.1	7	23	3.3	11	1	3	11	1	1
2026	NYG	8	4	2–1–1	96	166	57.8	1,028	6.2	40	8	5	79.6	20	62	3.1	15	1	16	56	1	1
Career		115	93	38–54–1	2,077	3,410	60.9	25,820	7.6	89	164	118	86.0	350	1,382	3.9	26	14	238	1,457	62	28

Postseason statistics
Year	Team	Games			Passing									Rushing					Sacks		Fumbles	
Year	Team	GP	GS	Record	Cmp	Att	Pct	Yds	Y/A	Lng	TD	Int	Rtg	Att	Yds	Avg	Lng	TD	Sck	SckY	Fum	Lost
2020	NO	1	0	—	1	1	100.0	56	56.0	56	1	0	158.3	0	0	0.0	0	0	0	0	0	0
Career		1	0	0–0	1	1	100.0	56	56.0	56	1	0	158.3	0	0	0.0	0	0	0	0	0	0

=== College football ===
Legend
Led the NCAA

Season	Team	Games			Passing								Rushing			
Season	Team	GP	GS	Record	Comp	Att	Pct	Yards	Avg	TD	Int	Rate	Att	Yards	Avg	TD
2012	Florida State	Redshirt (redshirt)														
2013	Florida State	14	14	**14–0**	257	384	**66.9**	**4,057**	**10.6**	**40**	10	**184.8**	**77**	**193**	**2.5**	**4**
2014	Florida State	13	13	12–1	**305**	**467**	65.4	3,907	8.4	25	**18**	145.5	57	65	1.2	3
Total		27	27	26–1	562	851	66.0	7,964	9.4	65	28	163.3	134	258	1.9	7

=== College baseball ===
Season	Team	IP	W	L	SV	ERA	SO	BB	BA	H	R	HR	RBI	BB	SLG/OBP
2013	Florida State	27.0	1	2	2	3.00	21	12	.235	28	21	0	9	22	.345/.377
2014	Florida State	33.1	1	0	7	1.08	31	7	.128	5	6	0	4	8	.179/.292
Total		60.1	2	2	9	1.95	62	19	.208	33	27	0	13	30	

== Career highlights ==
=== Awards and honors ===
NFL

- Pepsi NFL Rookie of the Year (2015)
- Pro Bowl (2015)
- NFL passing yards leader (2019)
- PFWA All-Rookie Team (2015)
- Ranked No. 57 in the Top 100 Players of 2017

College

- Heisman Trophy (2013)
- Walter Camp Award (2013)
- Manning Award (2013)
- Archie Griffin Award (2013)
- AP Player of the Year (2013)
- Sporting News Player of the Year (2013)
- BCS National Championship (2014)
- BCS National Championship Offensive MVP (2014)
- Orange Bowl champion (2013)
- Consensus All-American (2013)
- NCAA passer rating leader (2013)
- 2× First-team All-ACC (2013, 2014)
- ACC Player of the Year (2013)
- ACC Offensive Player of the Year (2013)
- ACC Rookie of the Year (2013)
- ACC Offensive Rookie of the Year (2013)
- ACC Athlete of the Year (2014)
- College Football Performance National Freshman of the Year (2013)
- ACC Championship Game MVP (2013)
- 3× ACC Championship (2012, 2013, 2014)

High school

- USA Today High School All-American (2011)

=== Records ===
==== NFL records ====
- Most passing touchdowns in a single game by a rookie quarterback: 5 (tied with Ray Buivid, Matthew Stafford, Deshaun Watson, Daniel Jones and C. J. Stroud)
- Most passing touchdowns by a rookie quarterback in one half: 4 (tied with Marcus Mariota and Deshaun Watson) (November 22, 2015, vs. Philadelphia Eagles)
- Youngest player to pass for 3,000 yards: (21 years, 342 days) December 13, 2015
- Youngest player to pass for 4,000 yards: (21 years, 363 days) January 3, 2016
- Second youngest player to pass for 10,000 yards: (23 years, 303 days; 4 days older than Drew Bledsoe) November 5, 2017
- Youngest player to pass for 40 touchdowns: (22 years, 312 days) November 13, 2016
- Most seasons of passing for 4,000 yards to begin a career: 2 (2015–2016)
- Most touchdown passes before 24th birthday: 69 (23 years, 360 days) December 31, 2017
- Most consecutive 450+ yards passing games: 2 (2019)
- Most interceptions returned for touchdowns in a season: 7 (2019)
- First player in NFL history to throw 30-or-more touchdowns and 30 interceptions in a season: (2019)
- Fewest yards in a game with 5+ touchdowns: 148 (September 12, 2021, vs. Green Bay Packers)

==== Buccaneers franchise records ====
===== Rookie records =====
- Most passing touchdowns by a rookie – 22
- Most passing yards by a rookie – 4,042
- Most pass attempts by a rookie – 535
- Most pass completions by a rookie – 312
- Most games started by a rookie – 16
- Most interceptions for a touchdown by a rookie – 2
- Highest passer rating by a rookie – 84.2
- Most yards gained per pass attempt by a rookie – 7.56
- Most passing yards per game – 252.6
- Most wins by a rookie – 6
- Most losses by a rookie – 10
- Most 4th quarter comebacks by a rookie – 2 (tied with Bruce Gradkowski, Mike Glennon, and Josh Freeman)
- Most game-winning drives by a rookie – 3 (tied with Bruce Gradkowski)
- Most rushing touchdowns by a rookie quarterback – 6
- Most rushing attempts by a rookie quarterback – 54

===== Game records =====
- Most consecutive games of 300 yards passing – 6 (Week 6–12, 2019)
- Most passing touchdowns in a game – 5 (tied) (November 22, 2015, vs. Philadelphia Eagles)
- Most passing attempts in a game – 58 (September 25, 2016, vs. Los Angeles Rams)
- Most pass completions in a game – 36 (tied with Brian Griese) (September 25, 2016, vs Los Angeles Rams) (Later broken by Tom Brady)

===== Season records =====
- Most rushing touchdowns by a quarterback in a season – 6 (2015)
- Most passing yards per game in a season – 319.3 (2019)
- Most consecutive seasons, 3,000 yards passing – 3 (2015–2017) (tied with Brad Johnson, Josh Freeman, and Tom Brady)
- Most seasons with 3,000+ passing yards – 4 (2015-2017, 2019)
- Most seasons of 4,000 yards passing – 3 (2015-2016, 2019) (tied with Tom Brady)
- Most games of 300 yards passing in a single season – 11 (2019)

===== Career records =====
- Most games of 300 passing yards – 27 (2015–2019)
- Most passing touchdowns – 121 (2015–2019)
- Most pass completions – 1,563 (2015–2019)
- Most passing yards – 19,737 (2015–2019)
- Most passing attempts – 2,548 (2015–2019)
- Most passing yards per game in a career – 274.1 (2015–2019)
- Most rushing yards by a quarterback – 1,044 (2015–2019)
- Most rushing attempts by a quarterback – 248 (2015–2019)
- Most fumbles – 50 (2015–2019)
- Most fumble recoveries in a career - 19 (2015-2019) (tied with Lavonte David)

==== Browns franchise records ====
===== Game records =====
- Most passing yards by a QB making their Browns starting debut – 334 (October 28, 2024, vs. Baltimore Ravens)
- Most passing yards in a game – 497 (December 2, 2024, vs. Denver Broncos)

== Personal life ==
Winston married his wife, Breion Allen, in a private ceremony held at their home on March 27, 2020. They have two sons together.

=== Legal Issues ===
==== Sexual assault allegation ====
On November 14, 2013, the State Attorney of the Second Judicial Circuit announced they were opening an investigation into a sexual assault allegation involving Winston that was originally filed with the Tallahassee Police Department (TPD) on December 7, 2012. The complaint was originally investigated by the police and classified as open/inactive in February 2013 with no charges being filed. The police report, containing the complainant's original statement, has been posted by the Tallahassee Police Department. Tallahassee police stated that the complaint was made inactive "when the victim in the case broke off contact with TPD, and her attorney indicated she did not want to move forward at that time" and then re-examined after media requests for information started coming in early November. On December 5, 2013, State Attorney Willie Meggs announced the completion of the investigation and that no charges would be filed against anyone in this case, citing "major issues" with the woman's testimony. Meggs stated that "As prosecutors, we only bring charges for cases where the evidence will result in a likely conviction at trial. In this case, the evidence does not show that." Allegations of improper police conduct have been made by both parties, with the complainant claiming to have been pressured into dropping her claim and Winston's attorney alleging inappropriate leaks to the media. Florida State's policy is that athletes charged with a felony cannot play until their case is resolved, but Winston continued to play throughout the investigation because he was never charged.

On April 16, 2014, The New York Times reported irregularities in the rape investigation involving Winston. The complainant developed bruises and semen was found on her underwear. 34 days later, the complainant identified Winston by name as her attacker. Tallahassee police contacted Winston about 13 days later. No DNA sample was taken from Winston until the prosecutor took over the case, months later; once it was taken in November 2013, it was found to match DNA found in the complainant's underwear. The investigation was conducted by Officer Scott Angulo, who, the Times' article notes, did private security work for the Seminole Boosters, the primary financier of Florida State athletics.

The official FSU hearing, presided over by retired Florida Supreme Court Justice Major B. Harding, on December 21, 2014, cleared Winston of violating the student conduct code in the sexual assault allegation. An extract from Harding's decision is below.

I do not find the credibility of one story substantially stronger than that of the other. Both have their own strengths and weaknesses. I cannot find with any confidence that the events as set forth by you, (accuser), or a particular combination thereof is more probable than not as required to find you responsible for a violation of the Code. Therein lies the determinative factor of my decision.

The accuser filed a civil suit against Winston in April 2014 and Winston countersued her for defamation and tortious interference in May 2014. In a September 2015 ruling, federal judge Anne C. Conway dismissed Winston's tortious interference claim, but declined a motion to dismiss his claim for defamation. These civil claims were settled out of court in December 2016, four months before the case was scheduled to go to trial.

In November 2015, Winston told CNN that he was prepared to file suit if the network aired The Hunting Ground, a documentary about college campus rape which includes disputed allegations about Winston. CNN was undeterred and aired the documentary on November 22, 2015.

In 2016, the university paid $950,000 to settle a lawsuit brought by the same woman alleging a violation of Title IX by FSU in handling her complaint. The university also agreed to conduct five years of sexual awareness programs. It did not admit liability.

==== Shoplifting incidents ====
In July 2013, a Burger King employee called police in July to complain that Winston was stealing soda. According to the police report, Winston came into the restaurant with three men, but did not order any food. An employee, who recognized him, first saw him using ketchup cups to take soda. He asked for a water cup after she told him to stop, but he said he would use it for soda and filled it repeatedly with soda over her objections, the report said. On April 29, 2014, Winston was issued an adult civil citation for shoplifting crab legs from a Tallahassee Publix store. Winston was ordered to undergo 20 hours of community service, and was suspended from any college baseball activity until he completed his community service.

==== Vulgar comments ====
On September 17, 2014, Winston was suspended for the first half of Florida State's upcoming game against Clemson. The Guardian reported that "several students tweeted" that Winston shouted, "Fuck her right in the pussy!" an Internet meme, while standing atop a table in Florida State University's Student Union. Two days later, university president Garnett S. Stokes and athletic director Stan Wilcox, citing results of an "ongoing investigation", announced that Winston would be suspended for the whole game.

==== 2017 groping allegation ====
On November 17, 2017, it was reported that the NFL conducted an investigation, where Winston allegedly groped a female Uber driver in 2016. Two days later, it was revealed that Ronald Darby, who also attended Florida State, was also on board during the ride in which this incident supposedly occurred. Darby has defended Winston against the allegations. However, the investigation found evidence that Winston got into another Uber ride alone, which was consistent with the Uber driver's account, and concluded that Winston "violated the Personal Conduct Policy by touching the driver in an inappropriate and sexual manner without her consent". The league announced on June 21 that it was suspending Winston for the first three games of the 2018 season as a result of his involvement in the incident, which it carried through on June 28.

== See also ==
- List of NCAA major college football yearly passing leaders
