= Madalena, Vila Nova de Gaia =

Madalena
- Civil parish
- Location in Portugal
- Coordinates: 41.116°N 8.651°W
- Country: Portugal
- Region: Norte
- Metropolitan area: Porto
- District: Porto
- Municipality: Vila Nova de Gaia

Area
  - Total: 4.69 km^{2} (1.81 sq mi)

Population (2011)
  - Total: 10,040
  - Density: 2,100/km^{2} (5,500/sq mi)
- Time zone: UTC+00:00 (WET)
  - Summer (DST): UTC+01:00 (WEST)

Madalena is a Portuguese parish in the municipality of Vila Nova de Gaia. Famous for its beaches, the parish makes border with the Atlantic Ocean and only a couple of miles close to Rio Douro. Due to its geographical location, the inhabitants can enjoy considerable sunshine duration all year with warm weather. It is a historical place over 800 years old with deep agricultural traditions and fishing practices.

The population in 2011 was 10,040, in an area of 4.69 km².

== Media ==
Notícias da Madalena is a free, quarterly regional newspaper that informs readers of the goings-on in Madalena.
