= Videobombing =

Internet meme

Videobombing is the phenomenon of an unexpected appearance in a video of individuals who were not intended to be there by the operators of the camera or the individuals being filmed. The act of inserting oneself into someone else's video is often done in order to play a practical joke on the cameraman or their subjects, and sometimes in a deliberate attempt to create a video that could go viral.

== Overview ==
For example, individuals wishing to videobomb someone may insert themselves into a video of a famous celebrity being interviewed, or a live news broadcast being filmed in the streets or in another area where outsiders are present. The individual will usually attempt to amuse the home audience by performing humorous and strange actions in the background, and may even distract and annoy the news reporter. Individuals aware that a news broadcast will occur nearby them may even prepare beforehand and turn up to the live broadcast adorning a silly costume. Some individuals, such as Rollen Stewart, Chris Bosh and Paul Yarrow, do this repeatedly.

A related term is photobombing, which applies the concept to a still photograph instead of video footage.
