= 2026 European Motocross Championship =

Motocross Competition in 2026

The 2026 European Motocross Championship was the 38th European Motocross Championship season since its revival in 1988. It included 16 events and 6 different classes. It started in Spain on 22 March and concluded in Turkey on 6 September. All rounds acted as support classes at the European rounds of the 2026 MXGP.

== EMX250 ==
A 12-round calendar for the 2026 season was announced in October 2025.

EMX250 is for riders competing on 2-stroke and 4-stroke motorcycles between 175cc-250cc. Only riders under the age of 21 are allowed to compete.

=== Calendar ===
Round	Date	Grand Prix	Location	Race 1 Winner	Race 2 Winner	Round Winner	Report
1	21–22 March	Andalucia	Almonte	(Spain) Francisco García	(Spain) Francisco García	(Spain) Francisco García	
2	28–29 March	Switzerland	Frauenfeld	(Spain) Francisco García	(Spain) Francisco García	(Spain) Francisco García	
3	11–12 April	Sardinia	Riola Sardo	(Spain) Francisco García	(Denmark) Nicolai Skovbjerg	(Denmark) Nicolai Skovbjerg	
4	18–19 April	Trentino	Pietramurata	(Spain) Francisco García	(Denmark) Nicolai Skovbjerg	(Australia) Jake Cannon	
5	30–31 May	Germany	Teutschenthal	(Denmark) Mads Fredsøe	(Spain) Francisco García	(Australia) Jake Cannon	
6	6–7 June	Latvia	Ķegums	(Spain) Francisco García	(Spain) Francisco García	(Spain) Francisco García	
7	20–21 June	Italy	Montevarchi	(Spain) Francisco García	(Spain) Francisco García	(Spain) Francisco García	
8	27–28 June	Portugal	Águeda	(Spain) Francisco García	(Spain) Francisco García	(Spain) Francisco García	
9	1–2 August	Flanders	Lommel	(Denmark) Nicolai Skovbjerg	(United Kingdom) Billy Askew	(Denmark) Nicolai Skovbjerg	
10	15–16 August	Sweden	Uddevalla	(Spain) Francisco García	(Spain) Francisco García	(Spain) Francisco García	
11	22–23 August	Netherlands	Arnhem	(Denmark) Nicolai Skovbjerg	(Denmark) Nicolai Skovbjerg	(Denmark) Nicolai Skovbjerg	
12	5–6 September	Turkey	Afyonkarahisar	(Spain) Francisco García	(Spain) Francisco García	(Spain) Francisco García	

=== Entry list ===
Team	Constructor	No	Rider	Rounds
SixtySeven Racing Team	KTM	100	(Belgium) Harry Seel	1–2, 4–12
SixtySeven Racing Team	Husqvarna	724	(Netherlands) Jaymian Ramakers	9, 11
SixtySeven Racing Team	KTM	919	(Austria) Maximilian Ernecker	1–8, 10
SixtySeven Racing Team	Husqvarna	2	(Denmark) Nicolai Skovbjerg	7–12
MX-Handel Husqvarna Racing	Husqvarna	2	(Denmark) Nicolai Skovbjerg	1–6
MX-Handel Husqvarna Racing	Husqvarna	14	(Estonia) Sebastian Leok	1–11
MX-Handel Husqvarna Racing	Husqvarna	40	(Estonia) Travis Leok	9
Team VENUM BUD Racing Kawasaki	Kawasaki	3	(Australia) Jake Cannon	All
Team VENUM BUD Racing Kawasaki	Kawasaki	29	(Spain) Francisco García	1–8, 10–12
Triumph Racing Nordics	Triumph	4	(Sweden) Nike Korsbeck	1–3
Triumph Racing Nordics	Triumph	320	(Sweden) Sebastian Sundman	1, 5–6
Team Beta MRT Racing	Beta	5	(Italy) Brando Rispoli	1–9
Team Beta MRT Racing	Beta	717	(France) Alexis Fueri	1–8
Maddii Racing Honda – ABF Italia	Honda	6	(Spain) Elias Escandell	4, 7–11
Maddii Racing Honda – ABF Italia	Honda	20	(Italy) Nicolò Alvisi	All
FlyOver Competition	Triumph	7	(Italy) Niccolò Mannini	2–5, 7
De Baets AIT Racing	Yamaha	8	(Bulgaria) Vencislav Toshev	1–7
De Baets AIT Racing	Yamaha	555	(Republic of Ireland) Cole McCullough	1–3
Cross Centeret Snellingen	Husqvarna	9	(Norway) Martin Bredesen	10
SB2 MX Talents Team	Gas Gas	11	(Spain) Gilen Albisua	1, 8, 11
KMP Honda Racing by DVAG	Honda	13	(Australia) Deacon Paice	9–10
KMP Honda Racing by DVAG	Honda	162	(Australia) Ky Woods	5
DVS Junior Racing TM	TM	13	(Australia) Deacon Paice	6
DVS Junior Racing TM	TM	81	(Belgium) Emile De Baere	11
DVS Junior Racing TM	TM	417	(Netherlands) Jayson van Drunen	1
Team VHR Racing	Yamaha	17	(France) Tom Brunet	1–11
Seven Motorsport TM Factory Support	TM	18	(Belgium) Douwe Van Mechgelen	1–6
Seven Motorsport	KTM	18	(Belgium) Douwe Van Mechgelen	8–10
MX Magmum	Gas Gas	21	(Latvia) Tomass Šaicāns	6
Husqvarna Motorcycles Nordic	Husqvarna	24	(Finland) Matias Miettinen	5–6
Triumph AQVA Racing Team	Triumph	25	(Estonia) Romeo Pikand	6
Team Yamaha Europe MJC	Yamaha	26	(New Zealand) Levi Townley	11
Team Yamaha Europe MJC	Yamaha	350	(France) Sleny Goyer	11
Arribas Triumph	Triumph	27	(Spain) Óscar Quirós	11
Motovation Motorsport Husqvarna	Husqvarna	28	(Netherlands) Dean Gregoire	1–9
Motovation Motorsport Husqvarna	Husqvarna	499	(Netherlands) Dani Heitink	3–11
KTM Sarholz Racing Team	Husqvarna	31	(Germany) Linus Jung	2, 4–5, 10–11
KTM Sarholz Racing Team	KTM	37	(South Africa) Trey Cox	3–4, 7, 9, 11
KTM Sarholz Racing Team	KTM	363	(Liechtenstein) Lyonel Reichl	1–7, 11–12
KTM Sarholz Racing Team	KTM	770	(Germany) Leon Rudolph	1–5
Team CTM Motorhomes / Priem MX	Gas Gas	32	(Belgium) Seth Priem	11
	Gas Gas	35	(Turkey) Irmak Yıldırım	12
Meyer Yamaha Racing	Yamaha	38	(Germany) Oskar Romberg	5, 9–10
Van Venrooy KTM Racing	KTM	39	(Hungary) Áron Katona	1–8
Sturm STC Racing Team	Gas Gas	43	(Latvia) Roberts Lūsis	6, 9, 11
Team CTM Motorhomes / Priem MX	Yamaha	46	(Belgium) Thybe Ceulemans	2–5, 9–11
Peak Spirit Racing Team	Triumph	50	(Switzerland) Kjetil Oswald	2, 4
Racestore KTM Factory Rookies	KTM	58	(Italy) Andrea Roberti	1–5, 7–9, 11
Ronnangsgård Racing	Yamaha	63	(Sweden) Erik Frisagård	9–10
MX-Academy Honda Racing by Meuwissen Motorsports	Honda	66	(New Zealand) Jack Ellingham	10–11
MX-Academy Honda Racing by Meuwissen Motorsports	Honda	81	(Belgium) Emile De Baere	1, 3–7, 9
MX-Academy Honda Racing by Meuwissen Motorsports	Honda	151	(Switzerland) Eliot Vidalenc	2
MX-Academy Honda Racing by Meuwissen Motorsports	Honda	747	(South Africa) Jordan van Wyk	5–7, 9–11
KTM Suomi	KTM	71	(Finland) Arttu Sahlstén	6, 9
KTM Suomi	KTM	90	(Finland) Onni Jaakonsaari	6
Boutaca Racing Team	KTM	78	(Portugal) Gonçalo Cardoso	1, 3–4, 8
Endurance MX	Gas Gas	79	(Italy) Luca Ghirelli	7
RFME MX Junior Team	Gas Gas	82	(Spain) Manuel López	1–8, 10–12
RFME MX Junior Team	Gas Gas	365	(Spain) Adrià Monné	1–8, 10–12
Laurense Motors Kawasaki Racing	Kawasaki	88	(Netherlands) Eric van Helvoirt	11
Mequitec Gas Gas Racing Team	Gas Gas	96	(Spain) Mauro Osinalde	1
Mequitec Gas Gas Racing Team	Gas Gas	240	(Chile) César Paine Díaz	9–11
Mequitec Gas Gas Racing Team	Gas Gas	494	(Spain) Pablo Lara	1, 8
Beddini Racing Ducati Corse Factory MX2 Team	Ducati	97	(Italy) Simone Mancini	All
MTA MX Racing	KTM	102	(Italy) Filippo Mantovani	1–2, 5–7, 9–10
Mehka KTM / Skawen	KTM	110	(Estonia) Richard Paat	2, 4–6, 9
Team Norway MX	Honda	111	(Norway) Theo Hansen	6, 10
Team Norway MX	Husqvarna	175	(Norway) Theodor Imenes	10
Team Norway MX	Honda	232	(Norway) Leander Thunshelle	5–6, 10
	KTM	112	(Spain) Víctor Beltrán	1
	KTM	114	(Ecuador) Allan Tapia	1
Bloms MX Racing	Husqvarna	117	(Sweden) Otto Gustavsson	10
JK Racing Yamaha	Yamaha	124	(Latvia) Jēkabs Kubuliņš	1–11
JK Racing Yamaha	Yamaha	478	(United Kingdom) Drew Stock	12
Motoland KTM	KTM	133	(France) Tom Caneele	9–10
Yamaha 115 M78 Team	Yamaha	137	(Brazil) Bernardo Tibúrcio	1–8
Yamaha 115 M78 Team	Yamaha	300	(Spain) Salvador Pérez	1
Cat Moto Bauerschmidt KTM	KTM	141	(Italy) Francesco Bellei	1–2, 5–12
Cat Moto Bauerschmidt KTM	KTM	265	(Australia) Byron Dennis	10–12
Cat Moto Bauerschmidt KTM	KTM	304	(Australia) Liam Owens	1–7
Cat Moto Bauerschmidt KTM	KTM	515	(Denmark) Mads Fredsøe	All
	KTM	146	(Denmark) Magnus Sørensen	11
Übermoto Pombal	KTM	147	(Portugal) Tomás Santos	8
Motos VR Yamaha	Yamaha	158	(Portugal) Vasco Salgado	8
Goswell	Honda	184	(United Kingdom) Jamie Keith	11
AG MX Racing	Honda	221	(Switzerland) Arthur Steffen	2
Yamaha Europe Monster Energy MJC	Yamaha	228	(Italy) Michael Conte	1, 3–4, 7–12
	Fantic	235	(Italy) Bernardo Dionisi	4
Max Bart Motorsports	Husqvarna	240	(Chile) César Paine Díaz	1–8
Max Bart Motorsports	Husqvarna	336	(Italy) Lorenzo Aglietti	1
	Husqvarna	247	(South Africa) Jean Visser	1–2
Dörr Motorsport Triumph Racing	Triumph	275	(Germany) Eric Rakow	1–5
VHR Yamaha Official EMX250 Team	Yamaha	295	(France) Mano Faure	1–4, 10–12
VHR Yamaha Official EMX250 Team	Yamaha	503	(Belgium) Jarne Bervoets	1–3, 5–12
2L Racing Officiel Team	KTM	299	(France) Dylan Conti	4
Vogelsang Powersports	Yamaha	312	(Switzerland) Noe Zumstein	2, 4
	KTM	321	(Italy) Alessandro Traversini	1–4, 8–9, 11
Ghidinelli Racing Team	KTM	329	(Italy) Maurizio Scollo	2–5, 7
Crendon Tru7 Honda Racing	Honda	330	(United Kingdom) Charlie Richmond	4
KTM Switzerland	KTM	331	(Switzerland) Noryn Polsini	2
KTM Switzerland	KTM	963	(Switzerland) Cyril Elsener	2
Bud Racing España	Gas Gas	337	(Spain) Bruno Miró	1, 4, 8
Triumph Racing Pavo & Rueda	Triumph	351	(Spain) Carlos Prat	1, 4, 8
Schmicker Silve Racing	KTM	358	(Finland) Nico Stenberg	6, 10
Schmicker Silve Racing	KTM	418	(Finland) Saku Mansikkamäki	6, 9–10
	Beta	364	(Italy) Mattia Nardo	2, 4
	Fantic	389	(France) Jules Pietre	2
Cat Moto Prospects	Husqvarna	400	(Netherlands) Roan Tolsma	1–8
Kop og Kande KBI	KTM	402	(Denmark) Casey Karstrøm	9–11
Nationwide Signs Triumph	Triumph	419	(United Kingdom) Joe Brookes	1–4
Nationwide Signs Honda	Honda	419	(United Kingdom) Joe Brookes	5–6, 8–12
FiveThreeSeven	Honda	427	(Netherlands) Mick Kennedy	2, 5, 9, 11
	Yamaha	436	(Belgium) Brent Van de Walle	9
Dirt Store Triumph Racing	Triumph	441	(United Kingdom) Billy Askew	1–6, 9–11
Yamaha Motor France/Monster Army/Drag'on Tek	Yamaha	446	(France) Adrien Petit	1
Kawasaki Suomi	Kawasaki	450	(Finland) Simo Koskinen	6, 10
Osička MX Team	KTM	466	(Czech Republic) Václav Janout	1–5, 7, 9–11
WMZ Racing Team	KTM	467	(Czech Republic) Jakub Zahradník	5–6
DAM Racing	Gas Gas	470	(Belgium) Wout van Beysterveldt	11
F4E Gas Gas Racing Team	Gas Gas	474	(Belgium) Ian Ampoorter	1–5, 9, 11
F4E Gas Gas Racing Team	Gas Gas	529	(Belgium) Maxime Lucas	1–2, 4, 9, 11
	Husqvarna	477	(Netherlands) Guus Oomen	1–6
East MX	Gas Gas	480	(Finland) Kasimir Hindersson	3–4, 6, 9–10
East MX	KTM	595	(Finland) Eliel Lehtinen	6
Brouwer Motors	KTM	485	(Netherlands) Senna van Voorst	5, 10–11
Husqvarna Motorcycles Scandinavia	Husqvarna	496	(Sweden) Alve Callemo	2, 4, 6, 10
Ten Kate Motoren	Yamaha	501	(Netherlands) Mirco ten Kate	11
Grizzly Racing Service	KTM	505	(Israel) Ben Almagor	4
Kawa Passion/Kawasaki France	Kawasaki	519	(France) Mateo Bernard	2
JP Xtreme Xperience	Fantic	522	(Netherlands) Timo Heuver	11
BRS Racing Team	Fantic	531	(Sweden) Hugo Bergqvist	6
MX Team Decouter	Yamaha	536	(Belgium) Arthur Decouter	9
MB Motocrossteam	Yamaha	541	(Norway) Romeo Hovind	11
	Husqvarna	543	(Sweden) Laban Alm	10
Gabriel SS24 KTM	KTM	574	(Netherlands) Gyan Doensen	All
TYK Team Yamaha Knobloch sponsored by A.T.E.C.	Yamaha	576	(Germany) Joel Franz	5
	Gas Gas	612	(Estonia) Joosep Pärn	6
	Yamaha	619	(Belgium) Hugo Stiennes	5
MX Team Achterhoek	Fantic	621	(Netherlands) Klaas-Jan Kruisselbrink	11
CanaryFactory	Gas Gas	646	(Spain) José Hernández	8
Team Castellari	KTM	651	(Italy) Giovanni Meneghello	4
Beta Trueba MX Racing Team	Beta	666	(Spain) Alejo Peral	1
	Husqvarna	701	(Lithuania) Marius Adomaitis	7–9, 11
Motobike Racing Team	KTM	712	(Switzerland) Toni Ziemer	1–2, 8
	Yamaha	737	(Switzerland) Noah Henzer	2
Ajo Motorsport	KTM	777	(Finland) Viktor Leppälä	6, 10–11
CEC Racing	Husqvarna	884	(Sweden) Casper Lindmark	1–2, 4, 8, 10–11
A.B. Racing Team	Gas Gas	928	(Italy) Vincenzo Bove	2, 4, 7
Westside Racing	Husqvarna	939	(Denmark) Emil Lodal	1–2
JPV Racing	KTM	949	(Finland) Vilho Vehviläinen	11
Kullen 1502 KTM	KTM	961	(Sweden) August Frisk	1–2
NTG Bærum Motocross	Husqvarna	979	(Norway) Edvard Hestvik	3–4, 6, 10–11
ATV Racing Team	Yamaha	981	(Sweden) Gustav Axelsson	6, 10

=== Riders Championship ===
Pos	Rider	Bike	AND (Andalusia)		SUI (Switzerland)		SAR (Sardinia)		TRE		GER (Germany)		LAT (Latvia)		ITA (Italy)		POR (Portugal)		FLA (Flanders)		SWE (Sweden)		NED (Netherlands)		TUR (Turkey)		Points
1	(Spain) Francisco García	Kawasaki	1	1	1	1	1	4	1	12	Ret	1	1	1	1	1	1	1			1	1	2	2	1	1	496
2	(Denmark) Nicolai Skovbjerg	Husqvarna	13	4	13	9	2	1	4	1	5	15	6	8	16	17	2	7	1	2	2	6	1	1	3	4	403
3	(Australia) Jake Cannon	Kawasaki	2	5	2	8	6	Ret	2	2	4	2	8	7	6	11	13	5	Ret	11	13	2	7	9	2	2	358
4	(Netherlands) Gyan Doensen	KTM	7	21	7	16	3	5	13	3	2	5	2	6	Ret	10	7	15	5	7	22	16	10	6	5	5	296
5	(Denmark) Mads Fredsøe	KTM	4	10	27	13	11	13	20	4	1	Ret	4	4	5	19	6	6	2	Ret	15	8	5	4	7	9	284
6	(Italy) Nicolò Alvisi	Honda	14	22	12	6	4	15	6	18	6	4	9	17	9	8	9	17	17	9	7	15	13	11	12	11	236
7	(Italy) Francesco Bellei	KTM	8	15	15	23					10	22	Ret	18	8	7	10	11	3	6	3	4	9	12	8	3	214
8	(France) Tom Brunet	Yamaha	10	9	18	17	14	10	Ret	9	12	9	Ret	5	14	16	18	13	10	3	6	10	3	Ret			197
9	(Latvia) Jēkabs Kubuliņš	Yamaha	5	6	29	27	24	11	21	22	15	6	11	3	13	13	17	16	9	10	12	Ret	14	7			170
10	(Italy) Simone Mancini	Ducati	22	23	4	3	22	Ret	Ret	10	8	Ret	26	Ret	4	14	5	9	Ret	15	10	11	DNQ	26	10	12	162
11	(United Kingdom) Billy Askew	Triumph	3	Ret	DNQ	DNQ	9	Ret	5	6	22	Ret	19	11					6	1	18	12	6	8			155
12	(Australia) Liam Owens	KTM	12	18	11	2	13	17	17	20	3	14	3	2	2	Ret											152
13	(Estonia) Sebastian Leok	Husqvarna	20	17	19	28	12	3	7	15	19	Ret	13	19	23	26	8	8	11	Ret	Ret	7	8	5			147
14	(Spain) Adrià Monné	Gas Gas	11	13	14	10	21	Ret	3	11	11	10	16	14	Ret	DNS	15	10			11	9	18	23	19	DNS	143
15	(Brazil) Bernardo Tibúrcio	Yamaha	31	3	5	4	DNQ	28	12	30	7	8	12	20	3	2	DNS	DNS									142
16	(United Kingdom) Joe Brookes	Triumph	25	Ret	36	12	Ret	19	10	Ret																	142
16	(United Kingdom) Joe Brookes	Honda									16	13	22	Ret			4	3	13	13	4	3	Ret	33	13	14	142
17	(Belgium) Jarne Bervoets	Yamaha	19	16	31	20	Ret	DNS			Ret	7	10	21	20	23	24	Ret	8	4	16	13	12	10	11	10	119
18	(Liechtenstein) Lyonel Reichl	KTM	17	12	6	7	Ret	DNS	19	7	9	3	Ret	24	Ret	DNS							DNS	18	9	8	118
19	(Hungary) Áron Katona	KTM	Ret	20	20	11	7	2	16	27	17	Ret	20	10	32	12	12	2									109
20	(France) Mano Faure	Yamaha	9	2	9	Ret	18	9	Ret	DNS											14	25	11	19	6	7	109
21	(Netherlands) Dean Gregoire	Husqvarna	27	7	34	19	16	7	8	17	13	19	21	13	12	15	11	12	Ret	DNS							104
22	(Australia) Byron Dennis	KTM																			5	5	4	3	4	6	103
23	(Netherlands) Dani Heitink	Husqvarna					10	6	11	8	21	18	15	16	24	Ret	20	23	4	5	30	33	Ret	Ret			98
24	(France) Alexis Fueri	Beta	6	30	3	15	19	26	Ret	5	Ret	DSQ	Ret	DNS	7	4	DNS	DNS									91
25	(Italy) Brando Rispoli	Beta	Ret	34	Ret	5	Ret	20	9	14	36	12	27	30	21	3	28	22	18	Ret							68
26	(Spain) Manuel López	Gas Gas	33	35	22	30	29	27	23	Ret	34	17	14	15	11	6	30	Ret			23	Ret	Ret	13	14	13	65
27	(Italy) Andrea Roberti	KTM	24	26	30	25	5	8	22	19	27	23			26	5	16	Ret	Ret	Ret			16	16			62
28	(Spain) Elias Escandell	Honda							33	26					19	18	3	4	25	14	21	24	Ret	Ret			50
29	(Belgium) Douwe Van Mechgelen	TM	Ret	31	25	26	17	18	27	Ret	18	24	Ret	Ret													47
29	(Belgium) Douwe Van Mechgelen	KTM															14	14	15	8	17	Ret					47
30	(Finland) Kasimir Hindersson	Gas Gas					8	Ret	DNQ	DNQ			30	9					12	12	28	18					46
31	(Finland) Saku Mansikkamäki	KTM											7	12					7	Ret	Ret	35					37
32	(Italy) Niccolò Mannini	Triumph			16	14	DNQ	DNQ	DNQ	DNQ	24	Ret			10	9											35
33	(Austria) Maximilian Ernecker	KTM	15	14	17	22	Ret	Ret	24	13	14	Ret	23	Ret	33	28	29	28			26	31					32
34	(Sweden) Alve Callemo	Husqvarna			Ret	29			18	16			Ret	32							8	14					28
35	(Netherlands) Roan Tolsma	Husqvarna	16	11	DNQ	DNQ	15	24	31	31	25	21	17	23	29	25	19	21									27
36	(Sweden) August Frisk	KTM	23	8	8	Ret																					26
37	(Finland) Nico Stenberg	KTM											5	Ret							25	19					18
38	(Belgium) Emile De Baere	Honda	DNQ	DNQ			Ret	14	DNQ	DNQ	26	11	DNQ	DNQ	31	Ret			21	Ret							17
38	(Belgium) Emile De Baere	TM																					21	25			17
39	(Italy) Maurizio Scollo	KTM			21	18	Ret	DNS	14	25	DNQ	DNQ			15	20											17
40	(Sweden) Laban Alm	Husqvarna																			9	17					16
41	(Lithuania) Marius Adomaitis	Husqvarna													Ret	Ret	23	19	16	24			22	14			14
42	(Belgium) Harry Seel	KTM	DNQ	DNQ	DNQ	DNQ			DNQ	DNQ	33	Ret	DNQ	DNQ	Ret	22	27	31	DNQ	21	24	27	DNQ	DNQ	15	15	12
43	(Chile) César Paine Díaz	Husqvarna	32	19	33	Ret	25	30	DNQ	35	31	Ret	DNQ	DNQ	18	27	22	20									12
43	(Chile) César Paine Díaz	Gas Gas																	27	19	36	32	17	22			12
44	(France) Jules Pietre	Fantic			10	Ret																					11
45	(Germany) Leon Rudolph	KTM	21	33	32	33	27	16	15	23	23	27															11
46	(United Kingdom) Drew Stock	Yamaha																							16	16	10
47	(Bulgaria) Vencislav Toshev	Yamaha	DNQ	DNQ	DNQ	DNQ	23	12	DNQ	DNQ	DNQ	DNQ	24	25	DNQ	DNQ											9
48	(South Africa) Trey Cox	KTM					30	23	Ret	33					25	Ret			20	16			19	28			8
49	(Italy) Michael Conte	Yamaha	DNQ	DNQ			DNQ	DNQ	DNQ	DNQ					34	33	34	33	DNQ	DNQ	DNQ	DNQ	DNQ	DNQ	17	17	8
50	(Estonia) Richard Paat	KTM			DNQ	DNQ			26	29	29	26	29	22					14	32							7
51	(New Zealand) Levi Townley	Yamaha																					15	21			6
52	(Finland) Viktor Leppälä	KTM											DNQ	DNQ							29	22	25	15			6
53	(Germany) Linus Jung	Husqvarna			DNQ	DNQ			DNQ	DNQ	20	16									Ret	26	DNQ	DNQ			6
54	(Turkey) Irmak Yıldırım	Gas Gas																							18	18	6
55	(Italy) Filippo Mantovani	KTM	26	27	DNS	DNS					32	Ret	Ret	31	22	21			28	17	27	DNS					4
56	(Italy) Vincenzo Bove	Gas Gas			DNQ	DNQ			25	37					17	Ret											4
57	(Netherlands) Mirco ten Kate	Yamaha																					Ret	17			4
58	(Latvia) Roberts Lūsis	Gas Gas											DNQ	28					26	18			24	Ret			3
59	(Finland) Matias Miettinen	Husqvarna									DNQ	DNQ	18	27													3
60	(Netherlands) Guus Oomen	Husqvarna	18	Ret	DNQ	DNQ	Ret	DNS	DNQ	DNQ	DNQ	DNQ	DNQ	DNQ													3
61	(Spain) Carlos Prat	Triumph	DNQ	DNQ					DNQ	DNQ							Ret	18									3
62	(Belgium) Ian Ampoorter	Gas Gas	30	29	26	DSQ	26	25	DNQ	DNQ	30	Ret							19	20			27	DNS			3
63	(Germany) Oskar Romberg	Yamaha									DNQ	DNQ							29	31	19	30					2
64	(Czech Republic) Václav Janout	KTM	DNQ	DNQ	28	24	28	29	30	21	28	Ret			30	Ret			31	26	20	23	Ret	27			1
65	(Italy) Alessandro Traversini	KTM	DNQ	DNQ	DNQ	DNQ	20	21	32	34							33	Ret	DNQ	DNQ			DNQ	DNQ			1
66	(Germany) Eric Rakow	Triumph	Ret	32	DNQ	DNQ	Ret	22	Ret	32	Ret	20															1
67	(Sweden) Casper Lindmark	Husqvarna	DNQ	DNQ	24	34			DNQ	DNQ							25	27			Ret	20	Ret	Ret			1
68	(United Kingdom) Jamie Keith	Honda																					Ret	20			1
69	(Finland) Vilho Vehviläinen	KTM																					20	Ret			1
	(Spain) Gilen Albisua	Gas Gas	DNQ	DNQ													21	24					Ret	29			0
	(Finland) Simo Koskinen	Kawasaki											25	26							32	21					0
	(Republic of Ireland) Cole McCullough	Yamaha	29	28	DSQ	21	Ret	Ret																			0
	(Estonia) Travis Leok	Husqvarna																	22	22							0
	(Netherlands) Mick Kennedy	Honda			DNQ	DNQ					DNQ	DNQ															0
	(Netherlands) Mick Kennedy	Yamaha																	DNQ	DNQ			23	24			0
	(Sweden) Erik Frisagård	Yamaha																	24	23	DNQ	DNQ					0
	(Finland) Arttu Sahlstén	KTM											28	29					23	25							0
	(Belgium) Maxime Lucas	Gas Gas	34	36	23	Ret			DNQ	DNQ									30	Ret			26	30			0
	(Spain) Bruno Miró	Gas Gas	37	37					28	24							26	Ret									0
	(France) Adrien Petit	Yamaha	28	24																							0
	(Spain) José Hernández	Gas Gas															36	25									0
	(Spain) Salvador Pérez	Yamaha	Ret	25																							0
	(Spain) Pablo Lara	Gas Gas	DNQ	DNQ													31	26									0
	(Netherlands) Jaymian Ramakers	Husqvarna																	Ret	27			DNQ	DNQ			0
	(South Africa) Jordan van Wyk	Honda									35	28	DNQ	DNQ	35	Ret			Ret	28	31	34	28	32			0
	(United Kingdom) Charlie Richmond	Honda							29	28																	0
	(Sweden) Otto Gustavsson	Husqvarna																			34	28					0
	(Portugal) Gonçalo Cardoso	KTM	DNQ	DNQ			DNQ	DNQ	DNQ	DNQ							32	29									0
	(Denmark) Casey Karstrøm	KTM																	32	29	DNQ	DNQ	DNQ	DNQ			0
	(Sweden) Gustav Axelsson	Yamaha											DNQ	DNQ							33	29					0
	(Norway) Edvard Hestvik	Husqvarna					DNQ	DNQ	DNQ	DNQ			DNQ	DNQ							DNQ	36	29	34			0
	(Belgium) Seth Priem	Gas Gas																					30	31			0
	(Belgium) Brent Van de Walle	Yamaha																	33	30							0
	(Portugal) Vasco Salgado	Yamaha															37	30									0
	(France) Mateo Bernard	Kawasaki			35	31																					0
	(Sweden) Nike Korsbeck	Triumph	DNQ	DNQ	DNQ	DNQ	DNQ	31																			0
	(Portugal) Tomás Santos	KTM															35	32									0
	(Italy) Luca Ghirelli	Gas Gas													36	32											0
	(Switzerland) Cyril Elsener	KTM			Ret	32																					0
	(Australia) Deacon Paice	TM											Ret	DNS													0
	(Australia) Deacon Paice	Honda																	Ret	33	DNQ	DNQ					0
	(Estonia) Romeo Pikand	Triumph											Ret	33													0
	(Norway) Leander Thunshelle	Honda									DNQ	DNQ	DNQ	DNQ							35	DNS					0
	(Italy) Mattia Nardo	Beta			DNQ	DNQ			Ret	36																	0
	(Finland) Onni Jaakonsaari	KTM											DNQ	Ret													0
	(Switzerland) Toni Ziemer	KTM	DNQ	DNQ	DNQ	DNQ											Ret	DNS									0
	(Latvia) Tomass Šaicāns	Gas Gas											Ret	DNS													0
	(Belgium) Thybe Ceulemans	Yamaha			DNQ	DNQ	DNQ	DNQ	DNQ	DNQ	DNQ	DNQ							DNQ	DNQ	DNQ	DNQ	DNQ	DNQ			0
	(Sweden) Sebastian Sundman	Triumph	DNQ	DNQ							DNQ	DNQ	DNQ	DNQ													0
	(Netherlands) Senna van Voorst	KTM									DNQ	DNQ									DNQ	DNQ	DNQ	DNQ			0
	(South Africa) Jean Visser	Husqvarna	DNQ	DNQ	DNQ	DNQ																					0
	(Denmark) Emil Lodal	Husqvarna	DNQ	DNQ	DNQ	DNQ																					0
	(Switzerland) Kjetil Oswald	KTM			DNQ	DNQ			DNQ	DNQ																	0
	(Switzerland) Noe Zumstein	Yamaha			DNQ	DNQ			DNQ	DNQ																	0
	(Czech Republic) Jakub Zahradník	KTM									DNQ	DNQ	DNQ	DNQ													0
	(Norway) Theo Hansen	Honda											DNQ	DNQ							DNQ	DNQ					0
	(France) Tom Caneele	KTM																	DNQ	DNQ	DNQ	DNQ					0
	(New Zealand) Jack Ellingham	Honda																			DNQ	DNQ	DNQ	DNQ			0
	(Netherlands) Jayson van Drunen	TM	DNQ	DNQ																							0
	(Italy) Lorenzo Aglietti	Husqvarna	DNQ	DNQ																							0
	(Spain) Alejo Peral	Beta	DNQ	DNQ																							0
	(Spain) Mauro Osinalde	Gas Gas	DNQ	DNQ																							0
	(Spain) Víctor Beltrán	KTM	DNQ	DNQ																							0
	(Ecuador) Allan Tapia	KTM	DNQ	DNQ																							0
	(Switzerland) Arthur Steffen	Honda			DNQ	DNQ																					0
	(Switzerland) Eliot Vidalenc	Honda			DNQ	DNQ																					0
	(Switzerland) Noryn Polsini	KTM			DNQ	DNQ																					0
	(Switzerland) Noah Henzer	Yamaha			DNQ	DNQ																					0
	(France) Dylan Conti	KTM							DNQ	DNQ																	0
	(Italy) Giovanni Meneghello	KTM							DNQ	DNQ																	0
	(Israel) Ben Almagor	KTM							DNQ	DNQ																	0
	(Italy) Bernardo Dionisi	Fantic							DNQ	DNQ																	0
	(Australia) Ky Woods	Honda									DNQ	DNQ															0
	(Belgium) Hugo Stiennes	Yamaha									DNQ	DNQ															0
	(Germany) Joel Franz	Yamaha									DNQ	DNQ															0
	(Estonia) Joosep Pärn	Gas Gas											DNQ	DNQ													0
	(Finland) Eliel Lehtinen	KTM											DNQ	DNQ													0
	(Sweden) Hugo Bergqvist	Fantic											DNQ	DNQ													0
	(Belgium) Arthur Decouter	Yamaha																	DNQ	DNQ							0
	(Norway) Martin Bredesen	Husqvarna																			DNQ	DNQ					0
	(Norway) Theodor Imenes	Husqvarna																			DNQ	DNQ					0
	(France) Sleny Goyer	Yamaha																					DNQ	DNQ			0
	(Belgium) Wout van Beysterveldt	Gas Gas																					DNQ	DNQ			0
	(Netherlands) Timo Heuver	Fantic																					DNQ	DNQ			0
	(Denmark) Magnus Sørensen	KTM																					DNQ	DNQ			0
	(Netherlands) Eric van Helvoirt	Kawasaki																					DNQ	DNQ			0
	(Netherlands) Klaas-Jan Kruisselbrink	Fantic																					DNQ	DNQ			0
	(Norway) Romeo Hovind	Yamaha																					DNQ	DNQ			0
	(Spain) Óscar Quirós	Triumph																					DNQ	DNQ			0
Pos	Rider	Bike	AND (Andalusia)		SUI (Switzerland)		SAR (Sardinia)		TRE		GER (Germany)		LAT (Latvia)		ITA (Italy)		POR (Portugal)		FLA (Flanders)		SWE (Sweden)		NED (Netherlands)		TUR (Turkey)		Points

=== Manufacturers Championship ===
Pos	Bike	AND (Andalusia)		SUI (Switzerland)		SAR (Sardinia)		TRE		GER (Germany)		LAT (Latvia)		ITA (Italy)		POR (Portugal)		FLA (Flanders)		SWE (Sweden)		NED (Netherlands)		TUR (Turkey)		Points
1	Kawasaki	1	1	1	1	1	4	1	2	4	1	1	1	1	1	1	1	Ret	11	1	1	2	2	1	1	537
2	KTM	4	8	6	2	3	2	13	3	1	3	2	2	2	5	6	2	2	6	3	4	4	3	4	3	465
3	Husqvarna	13	4	13	9	2	1	4	1	5	15	6	8	12	15	2	7	1	2	2	6	1	1	3	4	409
4	Yamaha	5	2	5	4	14	9	12	9	7	5	10	3	3	2	17	13	8	3	6	10	3	7	6	7	348
5	Honda	14	22	12	6	4	14	6	18	6	4	9	17	9	8	3	3	13	9	4	3	13	11	12	11	283
6	Triumph	3	32	16	12	9	19	5	6	22	20	19	11	10	9	Ret	18	6	1	18	12	6	8			198
7	Gas Gas	11	13	14	10	8	25	3	11	11	10	14	9	11	6	15	10	12	12	11	9	17	13	14	13	167
8	Ducati	22	23	4	3	22	Ret	Ret	10	8	Ret	26	Ret	4	14	5	9	Ret	15	10	11	DNQ	26	10	12	162
9	Beta	6	30	3	5	19	20	9	5	36	12	27	30	7	3	28	22	18	Ret							128
10	Fantic			10	Ret							DNQ	DNQ									DNQ	DNQ			11
11	TM	Ret	31	25	26	17	18	27	Ret	18	24	Ret	Ret									21	25			10
Pos	Bike	AND (Andalusia)		SUI (Switzerland)		SAR (Sardinia)		TRE		GER (Germany)		LAT (Latvia)		ITA (Italy)		POR (Portugal)		FLA (Flanders)		SWE (Sweden)		NED (Netherlands)		TUR (Turkey)		Points

== EMX125 ==
A 10-round calendar for the 2026 season was announced in October 2025.

EMX125 is for riders competing on 2-stroke motorcycles of 125cc.

=== Calendar ===
Round	Date	Grand Prix	Location	Race 1 Winner	Race 2 Winner	Round Winner	Report
1	21–22 March	Andalucia	Almonte	(Austria) Moritz Ernecker	(Denmark) Bertram Thorius	(Austria) Moritz Ernecker	
2	28–29 March	Switzerland	Frauenfeld	(Austria) Ricardo Bauer	(France) Liam Bruneau	(Austria) Ricardo Bauer	
3	11–12 April	Sardinia	Riola Sardo	(Austria) Moritz Ernecker	(France) Sleny Goyer	(Austria) Moritz Ernecker	
4	18–19 April	Trentino	Pietramurata	(Austria) Moritz Ernecker	(Austria) Moritz Ernecker	(Austria) Moritz Ernecker	
5	23–24 May	France	Lacapelle-Marival	(Austria) Moritz Ernecker	(Austria) Ricardo Bauer	(Austria) Ricardo Bauer	
6	6–7 June	Latvia	Ķegums	(Austria) Ricardo Bauer	(Austria) Moritz Ernecker	(Austria) Moritz Ernecker	
7	27–28 June	Portugal	Águeda	(France) Sleny Goyer	(Austria) Ricardo Bauer	(Austria) Ricardo Bauer	
8	18–19 July	United Kingdom	Foxhill	(Austria) Ricardo Bauer	(Austria) Ricardo Bauer	(Austria) Ricardo Bauer	
9	15–16 August	Sweden	Uddevalla	(Austria) Ricardo Bauer	(Austria) Ricardo Bauer	(Austria) Ricardo Bauer	
10	5–6 September	Turkey	Afyonkarahisar	(Austria) Ricardo Bauer	(Austria) Ricardo Bauer	(Austria) Ricardo Bauer	

=== Entry list ===
Team	Constructor	No	Rider	Rounds
JK Racing Yamaha	Yamaha	4	(Switzerland) Jarno Jansen	1–9
JK Racing Yamaha	Yamaha	391	(Switzerland) Luis Santeusanio	2, 4–5, 7–9
JK Racing Yamaha	Yamaha	418	(United Kingdom) Drew Stock	1–2, 5–8
	KTM	5	(Turkey) Deniz Karahan	10
	Yamaha	9	(Spain) Gonzalo Salvador	1–4
KG MX Team	KTM	10	(Norway) Erling Engeland	9
KG MX Team	KTM	779	(Norway) Albert Listøen Owsinski	3–4, 6, 9
bLU cRU MX Team Yamaha	Yamaha	14	(Spain) José Luis Moreno	5, 7
737 Performance KTM/D'stock 41	KTM	15	(Sweden) Max Lindström	1–4, 6, 9
737 Performance KTM/D'stock 41	KTM	118	(United States) Sawyer Gieck	3–4
737 Performance KTM/D'stock 41	KTM	214	(France) Léo Diss-Fenard	1–7, 9
737 Performance KTM/D'stock 41	KTM	309	(France) Eliot Buysschaert	1–9
737 Performance KTM/D'stock 41	KTM	715	(France) Rafael Mennillo	1–9
RFME MX Junior Team	Gas Gas	16	(Spain) Jordi Alba	1–7, 9–10
RFME MX Junior Team	Gas Gas	367	(Spain) Pau Caudet	1–8, 10
	Yamaha	18	(Slovenia) Alex Novak	1–5, 9
	Gas Gas	19	(Belgium) Seppe Giuliani	4
Adrenaline Motos	KTM	21	(Switzerland) Kelyan Pavid	2
Husqvarna Motorcycles Scandinavia	Husqvarna	20	(Norway) Marzell Amundsen	4, 9
Forsell Motor Racing Team	Husqvarna	22	(Sweden) Liam Sörensson	1–4, 6, 9
Forsell Motor Racing Team	Husqvarna	390	(Sweden) Ville Strömer	9
Forsell Motor Racing Team	Husqvarna	439	(Sweden) Albin Forsell	6, 9
E. Castro Motos	Yamaha	23	(Spain) Alejandro Torres	1, 7
E. Castro Motos	Yamaha	128	(Spain) Óscar Rueda	1
E. Castro Motos	Yamaha	385	(Spain) Jorge Salvador	1–5, 7–9
	Gas Gas	24	(Latvia) Rojus Zaborskis	6
BRS Racing Team	Fantic	25	(Sweden) Emil Bergqvist	6, 9
Team Yamaha Europe MJC	Yamaha	26	(New Zealand) Levi Townley	5–9
Team Yamaha Europe MJC	Yamaha	350	(France) Sleny Goyer	All
Yamaha Motor Scandinavia	Yamaha	28	(Denmark) Storm Maymann	1–9
	KTM	29	(Netherlands) Jannes Vos	1–4, 8
Fosse Hill Lakeside	Yamaha	31	(United Kingdom) Archie Butterfield	5, 8
Team CTM Motorhomes / Priem MX	Gas Gas	32	(Belgium) Seth Priem	1–4, 8
Pro Stage Motoland Amiens	Yamaha	34	(France) Tim Langue	5
Power by JJ	KTM	37	(Sweden) Arthur Ejdbring	9
Power by JJ	Husqvarna	399	(Sweden) Rocco Ekman	9
Power by JJ	KTM	402	(Denmark) Casey Karstrøm	6
	Yamaha	39	(Israel) Itamar Amar	6
MX-Handel Husqvarna Racing	Husqvarna	40	(Estonia) Travis Leok	2–3, 6–7
MX-Handel Husqvarna Racing	Husqvarna	775	(Estonia) Marten Raud	3–4, 6
	Yamaha	42	(Italy) Omar Guerra	3–4
De Baets AIT Racing	Yamaha	61	(Belgium) Torre Van Mechgelen	1–9
De Baets AIT Racing	Yamaha	484	(Netherlands) Dex Kooiker	4–8
Mandrile Racing Team	Yamaha	65	(Italy) Francesco Assini	1–8
2F MX	Yamaha	69	(France) Célestin Renaud	5
Fantic Factory Racing EMX125	Fantic	71	(Denmark) Bertram Thorius	All
Fantic Factory Racing EMX125	Fantic	911	(Italy) Gennaro Utech	All
	Yamaha	96	(Bulgaria) Dani Tsankov	8
	KTM	105	(Spain) Bruno López	1
	TM	110	(United Kingdom) Alfie Herron	4–5, 8
KTM Eesti	KTM	111	(Estonia) Lucas Leok	1–9
Jezyk Racing Team	Yamaha	114	(Israel) Tal Ovadia	5, 7
Jezyk Racing Team	KTM	121	(Spain) Gorka Gardoy	7
	TM	117	(Netherlands) Brayn van Vulpen	2
Odorizzi Motosport	Yamaha	132	(Italy) Marco Fruet	4
KTM SB Racing Team	KTM	134	(China) Jin Yu Yang	3–4, 7
Yamaha Bermudez Motos	Yamaha	137	(Colombia) Jacobo Roman	1–3, 5–7
	Yamaha	139	(Portugal) Bernardo Pinto	7
	Yamaha	422	(Portugal) Duarte Pinto	7
Meyer Yamaha Racing	Yamaha	153	(Germany) Max Meyer	2, 5, 9
Backyard Racing	KTM	160	(Switzerland) Sven Wiederkehr	2
Triumph Berlin	KTM	169	(Germany) Nico Woltersdorf	3
S Briggs Commercial	Yamaha	184	(United Kingdom) Archie Stapley	4–5, 8
	KTM	195	(Italy) Mattia Giuliani	4
Oppliger Racing	KTM	202	(Switzerland) Ryan Oppliger	1–2, 8–10
Dreams Racing	KTM	205	(Italy) Raffaele Frappa	1–9
Dreams Racing	KTM	281	(Italy) David Cracco	1–9
Dreams Racing	KTM	737	(Italy) Luca Colonnelli	1–9
	KTM	209	(Italy) Diego Spitaleri	4
MCV Motorsport-TM Moto	TM	211	(Italy) Riccardo Pini	1–9
MCV Motorsport-TM Moto	TM	777	(Italy) Cristian Amali	1–8
Motobike Racing Team	KTM	223	(Switzerland) Emil Ziemer	All
Drag'on Tek	Yamaha	227	(France) Arno Cazet	1–9
Pardi Racing	KTM	234	(Italy) Liam Pichler	3–4
	Gas Gas	236	(United Kingdom) Joel Winstanley-Dawson	8
DP19 Racing	TM	246	(Italy) Giorgio Verderosa	1–5
HTS KTM Racing Team	KTM	252	(Romania) Márk Szőke Eross	2–4
	KTM	259	(United Kingdom) Fabian Morrison Jr.	8
Mequitec Gas Gas Racing Team	Gas Gas	268	(Spain) Joel Mataró	1–5, 7, 9
Insubria Team Motocross	Yamaha	275	(Italy) Edoardo Riganti	1–8
Insubria Team Motocross	Yamaha	318	(Italy) Giacomo Dondè	8–9
Amsil Racing Team	KTM	288	(Italy) Marco Campoduni	4
Amsil Racing Team	KTM	810	(Italy) Matteo Garattoni	4
Norman KTM Factory Rookies	KTM	292	(Austria) Ricardo Bauer	All
Norman KTM Factory Rookies	KTM	929	(Austria) Moritz Ernecker	1–7, 9–10
Team TMX Competition	KTM	301	(France) Liam Bruneau	1–9
Team TMX Competition	KTM	882	(France) Enzo Herzogenrath	1–5, 7–9
Max Bart Motorsports	Husqvarna	306	(Italy) Lapo Aglietti	1–4
	Husqvarna	311	(Italy) Leonardo Calandra	1–5, 7–8
Team WID Motorsport	Gas Gas	314	(France) Wesley Suteau	5
Seven Motorsport TM Factory Support	TM	320	(Italy) Francesco Quintili	1–4, 6–7, 9
Team Pavo & Rueda	Yamaha	322	(Spain) Nil Pallarès	1, 5
TM Moto CRD Motosport Factory Racing	TM	353	(Italy) Andrea Uccellini	1–5
	Gas Gas	372	(Portugal) Bernardo Caiado	1
Ausió Racing Team - Yamaha	Yamaha	374	(Spain) Oleguer Riba	1–5, 7–8
	Husqvarna	425	(Sweden) Benjamin Mårtensson	9
Team KTM Scandinavia	KTM	431	(Sweden) Dante Lantz	7–9
MB Motocrossteam	Yamaha	441	(Norway) Romeo Hovind	6, 9
	Husqvarna	451	(Sweden) Melker Larsson	1–6, 9
TM Moto UK	TM	467	(United Kingdom) Arthur Moore	8
RGS Racing Team	Yamaha	490	(Belgium) Vince van Hoof	3–4
Gebben Racing	Yamaha	502	(Netherlands) Kay Zijlstra	9
MX Infected Racing Team	Gas Gas	511	(Portugal) Tony Oliveira	3–4
	Fantic	512	(Belgium) Liam Pölöskei	2, 5
Becker Racing	Gas Gas	516	(Germany) Luca Frank	2
Becker Racing	KTM	811	(Germany) Mark Tanneberger	1–4, 6, 9
MotoproX MRA Racing Team	Husqvarna	520	(Slovakia) Maxim Zimmerman	1–2
JP Xtreme Xperience	Fantic	522	(Netherlands) Timo Heuver	1–9
Cab Screens Crescent Yamaha	Yamaha	531	(United Kingdom) Lucas Moncrieff	3–5, 7–8
Chambers KTM Racing	KTM	548	(United Kingdom) Hayden Statt	1–4, 7–9
Complete Racing Solutions Elite Team	KTM	567	(United Kingdom) Brian Gyles	All
Zauner Racing Team	KTM	572	(Slovenia) Tjaš Jelovšek	4
	KTM	584	(Austria) Lukas Simma	2, 4
Yamaha Keskus	Yamaha	602	(Estonia) Aston Allas	1–4, 6, 9
Chaos in the House MX	KTM	634	(Sweden) Casper Eriksson	9
	KTM	639	(Estonia) Bruno Mägi	6
CanaryFactory	Yamaha	646	(Spain) José Hernández	1
	Husqvarna	668	(Sweden) Theo Tidlund	6
Amoq Sports	KTM	694	(Sweden) Helmer Nilsson	9
	Yamaha	702	(Norway) Dennis Stene	6, 9
	Gas Gas	716	(Sweden) Charlie Nilsson	6
KTM Kosak Team	KTM	719	(Germany) Simon Hahn	2, 5
JJ Racers Training	Gas Gas	722	(Latvia) Jēkabs Hudolejs	4, 9
	Husqvarna	742	(Estonia) Enri Lustus	3–4, 6, 9
Johannes Bikes	Fantic	747	(Italy) Spartaco Pitanti	2–4, 9
Bloms MX Racing	KTM	748	(Sweden) Wilhelm Löfgren	9
	Gas Gas	757	(Latvia) Toms Dankerts	6
	Yamaha	770	(France) Ewan Bonnet	5
	Husqvarna	771	(Germany) Lennard Geidel	9
PowerbyJJ Racing Team	KTM	801	(Sweden) Jack Ljungnér	3–4, 6, 9
	KTM	828	(Italy) Samuele Piredda	3
DVS Junior TM Racing	TM	834	(United Kingdom) Oscar Gilham	5–6, 8
	Yamaha	868	(France) Maxence Maupin	1–2, 5
	Husqvarna	959	(France) Valentin Berjaud	5
	KTM	999	(Sweden) Jamie Hammarstig	9

=== Riders Championship ===
Pos	Rider	Bike	AND (Andalusia)		SUI (Switzerland)		SAR (Sardinia)		TRE		FRA (France)		LAT (Latvia)		POR (Portugal)		GBR (United Kingdom)		SWE (Sweden)		TUR (Turkey)		Points
1	(Austria) Ricardo Bauer	KTM	4	10	1	2	26	3	3	2	2	1	1	9	2	1	1	1	1	1	1	1	419
2	(Austria) Moritz Ernecker	KTM	1	3	2	7	1	2	1	1	1	3	2	1	9	16			13	10	6	2	344
3	(France) Sleny Goyer	Yamaha	2	2	3	Ret	Ret	1	2	6	4	2	5	6	1	4	4	Ret	5	2	3	3	336
4	(Denmark) Bertram Thorius	Fantic	8	1	5	Ret	5	7	4	29	9	13	11	5	4	2	2	5	7	5	4	5	290
5	(Switzerland) Emil Ziemer	KTM	Ret	Ret	11	8	3	4	7	4	6	6	Ret	8	10	5	3	6	8	4	5	4	264
6	(Italy) Gennaro Utech	Fantic	Ret	5	10	Ret	13	16	6	8	5	4	6	3	3	Ret	7	7	4	3	7	8	250
7	(Italy) David Cracco	KTM	5	4	14	19	4	14	10	7	16	8	29	4	11	14	6	9	26	6			189
8	(France) Liam Bruneau	KTM	6	14	4	1	Ret	21	11	13	17	Ret	Ret	20	12	3	5	4	2	18			177
9	(Italy) Riccardo Pini	TM	13	Ret	27	Ret	2	10	9	5	Ret	10	10	11	8	7	12	15	9	8			169
10	(Estonia) Lucas Leok	KTM	15	12	13	Ret	8	5	12	3	15	12	9	17	18	6	18	8	16	7			165
11	(New Zealand) Levi Townley	Yamaha									7	5	4	2	13	10	8	2	3	12			153
12	(Italy) Edoardo Riganti	Yamaha	7	9	18	10	14	11	8	9	8	15	15	13	6	11	Ret	26					140
13	(Switzerland) Ryan Oppliger	KTM	3	6	Ret	6											9	3	6	24	2	6	134
14	(Italy) Andrea Uccellini	TM	9	7	6	3	10	13	19	12	3	Ret											111
15	(Denmark) Storm Maymann	Yamaha	11	23	20	20	7	18	15	10	19	7	7	10	17	13	19	18	18	28			107
16	(Spain) Pau Cadet	Gas Gas	22	8	17	9	Ret	30	Ret	14	10	22	Ret	Ret	5	9	DNS	DNS			9	10	98
17	(Netherlands) Timo Heuver	Fantic	10	13	DNQ	DNQ	6	17	25	27	23	11	3	36	26	18	21	23	10	15			88
18	(France) Arno Cazet	Yamaha	26	18	15	15	18	6	21	31	11	Ret	20	29	32	24	10	16	11	13			78
19	(France) Eliot Buysschaert	KTM	25	29	12	16	21	36	33	21	13	14	13	7	19	30	Ret	19	19	11			67
20	(Spain) Oleguer Riba	Yamaha	Ret	11	26	Ret	DNQ	DNQ	14	22													63
20	(Spain) Oleguer Riba	Gas Gas									26	9			15	8	17	10					63
21	(Spain) Jordi Alba	Gas Gas	Ret	28	9	12	31	26	16	38	21	17	18	Ret	23	Ret			24	22	10	7	58
22	(Spain) Jorge Salvador	Yamaha	12	21	24	24	9	12	13	16	12	Ret			30	34	16	22	27	21			57
23	(France) Rafael Mennillo	KTM	Ret	17	8	28	DNQ	DNQ	24	35	14	28	21	18	21	12	11	12	Ret	DNS			55
24	(United Kingdom) Hayden Statt	KTM	Ret	16	7	Ret	28	8	28	17					28	29	14	21	31	14			50
25	(United Kingdom) Brian Gyles	KTM	DNQ	DNQ	DNQ	DNQ	Ret	28	26	11	28	19	32	12	31	28	Ret	24	34	19	8	9	48
26	(Netherlands) Dex Kooiker	Yamaha							17	15	22	Ret	8	23	7	15	Ret	13					46
27	(France) Léo Diss-Fenard	KTM	18	26	21	13	20	19	5	26	24	Ret	14	28	27	26			23	33			37
28	(Sweden) Dante Lantz	KTM													14	23	Ret	14	15	9			32
29	(United Kingdom) Drew Stock	Yamaha	20	15	23	17					Ret	16	17	27	24	20	13	20					30
30	(Estonia) Aston Allas	Yamaha	16	20	DNQ	DNQ	17	9	DNQ	DNQ			25	19					17	20			29
31	(Italy) Leonardo Calandra	Husqvarna	Ret	Ret	16	Ret	Ret	32	18	25	25	Ret			20	17	15	11					29
32	(Italy) Cristian Amali	TM	21	33	29	4	19	22	20	Ret	29	18	26	24	33	31	Ret	17					28
33	(Sweden) Melker Larsson	Husqvarna	14	19	19	11	16	Ret	Ret	23	34	Ret	DNQ	DNQ					28	27			26
34	(Italy) Luca Colonnelli	KTM	29	32	25	5	30	24	30	24	DNQ	DNQ	Ret	14	40	27	30	32	DNQ	DNQ			23
35	(Belgium) Torre Van Mechgelen	Yamaha	17	24	DNQ	Ret	Ret	15	36	20	Ret	20	12	32	36	Ret	27	Ret	32	Ret			21
36	(Turkey) Deniz Karahan	KTM																			11	11	20
37	(Switzerland) Luis Santeusanio	Yamaha			Ret	Ret			22	Ret	Ret	30			39	22	28	29	12	17			13
38	(United States) Sawyer Gieck	KTM					11	33	DNQ	DNQ													10
39	(Estonia) Marten Raud	Husqvarna					12	27	34	33			33	22									9
40	(Sweden) Liam Sörensson	Husqvarna	Ret	Ret	34	Ret	Ret	Ret	Ret	18			16	Ret					20	26			9
41	(Estonia) Travis Leok	Husqvarna			35	Ret	Ret	DNS					19	15	22	21							8
42	(Spain) José Luis Moreno	Yamaha									18	21			16	Ret							8
43	(Latvia) Jēkabs Hudolejs	Gas Gas							DNQ	DNQ									14	25			7
44	(Slovenia) Alex Novak	Yamaha	DNQ	DNQ	36	14	DNQ	DNQ	DNQ	DNQ	35	29							36	36			7
45	(Colombia) Jacobo Roman	Yamaha	DNQ	DNQ	DNQ	DNQ	15	Ret					22	21	25	25							6
46	(Sweden) Jack Ljungnér	KTM					29	37	DNQ	DNQ			23	16					30	32			5
47	(Germany) Max Meyer	Yamaha			32	DNS					Ret	Ret							Ret	16			5
48	(Spain) Alejandro Torres	Yamaha	19	27											29	19							4
49	(Switzerland) Jarno Jansen	Yamaha	30	30	31	18	27	25	29	34	27	25	DNQ	DNQ	35	32	23	27	21	29			3
50	(Italy) Giorgio Verderosa	TM	27	25	DNQ	DNQ	DNQ	DNQ	32	19	DNQ	DNQ											2
51	(Germany) Mark Tanneberger	KTM	28	22	DNQ	DNQ	23	20	35	28			27	30					Ret	31			1
52	(Italy) Francesco Assini	Yamaha	24	31	DNQ	DNQ	32	29	DNQ	DNQ	20	24	Ret	26	34	Ret	26	Ret					1
53	(Bulgaria) Dani Tsankov	Yamaha															20	28					1
	(Slovakia) Maxim Zimmerman	Husqvarna	32	34	33	21																	0
	(France) Enzo Herzogenrath	KTM	DNQ	DNQ	22	Ret	DNQ	DNQ	DNQ	DNQ	30	27			38	35	25	30	29	30			0
	(United Kingdom) Joel Winstanley-Dawson	Gas Gas															22	25					0
	(Netherlands) Jannes Vos	KTM	DNQ	DNQ	DNQ	DNQ	22	35	DNQ	DNQ							31	34					0
	(Sweden) Max Lindström	KTM	DNQ	DNQ	DNQ	DNQ	DNQ	DNQ	DNQ	DNQ			DNQ	DNQ					22	Ret			0
	(Belgium) Seth Priem	Gas Gas	23	Ret	30	Ret	Ret	23	23	30							Ret	33					0
	(Germany) Luca Frank	Gas Gas			37	23																	0
	(Netherlands) Kay Zijlstra	Yamaha																	Ret	23			0
	(France) Tim Langue	Yamaha									DNQ	23											0
	(Estonia) Enri Lustus	Husqvarna					24	31	DNQ	DNQ			DNQ	DNQ					DNQ	DNQ			0
	(Norway) Dennis Stene	Yamaha											24	33					DNQ	DNQ			0
	(United Kingdom) Alfie Herron	TM							DNQ	DNQ	DNQ	DNQ					24	35					0
	(Sweden) Charlie Nilsson	Gas Gas											30	25									0
	(Sweden) Benjamin Mårtensson	Husqvarna																	25	Ret			0
	(France) Ewan Bonnet	Yamaha									31	26											0
	(Spain) Joel Mataró	Gas Gas	DNQ	DNQ	DNQ	DNQ	DNQ	DNQ	27	32	33	Ret			DNQ	DNQ			DNQ	DNQ			0
	(Norway) Romeo Hovind	Yamaha											28	Ret					33	37			0
	(Germany) Simon Hahn	KTM			28	Ret					DNQ	DNQ											0
	(United Kingdom) Archie Stapley	Yamaha							DNQ	DNQ	DNQ	DNQ					29	36					0
	(United Kingdom) Arthur Moore	TM															33	31					0
	(Norway) Albert Listøen Owsinski	KTM					DNQ	34	DNQ	DNQ			31	35					DNQ	DNQ			0
	(Spain) Óscar Rueda	Yamaha	31	35																			0
	(Denmark) Casey Karstrøm	KTM											35	31									0
	(United Kingdom) Lucas Moncrieff	Yamaha					DNQ	DNQ	31	37	DNQ	DNQ			DNQ	DNQ	DNS	DNS					0
	(Israel) Tal Ovadia	Yamaha									32	DNS			37	33							0
	(United Kingdom) Fabian Junior Morrison	KTM															32	37					0
	(Latvia) Toms Dankerts	Gas Gas											34	34									0
	(Sweden) Emil Bergqvist	Fantic											DNQ	DNQ					DNQ	34			0
	(Italy) Giacomo Dondè	Yamaha															DNQ	DNQ	35	35			0
	(Italy) Matteo Garattoni	KTM							Ret	36													0
	(Austria) Lukas Simma	KTM			Ret	Ret			DNQ	DNQ													0
	(Italy) Raffaele Frappa	KTM	DNQ	DNQ	DNQ	DNQ	DNQ	DNQ	DNQ	DNQ	DNQ	DNQ	DNQ	DNQ	DNQ	DNQ	DNQ	DNQ	DNQ	DNQ			0
	(Italy) Francesco Quintili	TM	DNQ	DNQ	DNQ	DNQ	DNQ	DNQ	DNQ	DNQ			DNQ	DNQ	DNQ	DNQ			DNQ	DNQ			0
	(Spain) Gonzalo Salvador	Yamaha	DNQ	DNQ	DNQ	DNQ	DNQ	DNQ	DNQ	DNQ													0
	(Italy) Lapo Aglietti	Husqvarna	DNQ	DNQ	DNQ	DNQ	DNQ	DNQ	DNQ	DNQ													0
	(Italy) Spartaco Pitanti	Fantic			DNQ	DNQ	DNQ	DNQ	DNQ	DNQ									DNQ	DNQ			0
	(France) Maxence Maupin	Yamaha	DNQ	DNQ	DNQ	DNQ					DNQ	DNQ											0
	(Romania) Márk Szőke Eross	KTM			DNQ	DNQ	DNQ	DNQ	DNQ	DNQ													0
	(China) Jin Yu Yang	KTM					DNQ	DNQ	DNQ	DNQ					DNQ	DNQ							0
	(United Kingdom) Oscar Gilham	TM									DNQ	DNQ	DNQ	DNQ			DNQ	DNQ					0
	(Spain) Nil Pallarès	Yamaha	DNQ	DNQ							DNQ	DNQ											0
	(Belgium) Liam Pölöskei	Fantic			DNQ	DNQ					DNQ	DNQ											0
	(Belgium) Vince van Hoof	Yamaha					DNQ	DNQ	DNQ	DNQ													0
	(Portugal) Tony Oliveira	Gas Gas					DNQ	DNQ	DNQ	DNQ													0
	(Italy) Omar Guerra	KTM					DNQ	DNQ	DNQ	DNQ													0
	(Italy) Liam Pichler	KTM					DNQ	DNQ	DNQ	DNQ													0
	(Norway) Marzell Amundsen	Husqvarna							DNQ	DNQ									DNQ	DNQ			0
	(United Kingdom) Archie Butterfield	Yamaha									DNQ	DNQ					DNQ	DNQ					0
	(Sweden) Albin Forsell	Husqvarna											DNQ	DNQ					DNQ	DNQ			0
	(Spain) José Hernández	Yamaha	DNQ	DNQ																			0
	(Spain) Bruno López	KTM	DNQ	DNQ																			0
	(Portugal) Bernardo Caiado	Gas Gas	DNQ	DNQ																			0
	(Switzerland) Sven Wiederkehr	KTM			DNQ	DNQ																	0
	(Netherlands) Brayn van Vulpen	TM			DNQ	DNQ																	0
	(Switzerland) Kelyan Pavid	KTM			DNQ	DNQ																	0
	(Germany) Nico Woltersdorf	KTM					DNQ	DNQ															0
	(Italy) Samuele Piredda	KTM					DNQ	DNQ															0
	(Slovenia) Tjaš Jelovšek	KTM							DNQ	DNQ													0
	(Italy) Marco Campoduni	KTM							DNQ	DNQ													0
	(Belgium) Seppe Giuliani	Gas Gas							DNQ	DNQ													0
	(Italy) Marco Fruet	Yamaha							DNQ	DNQ													0
	(Italy) Mattia Giuliani	KTM							DNQ	DNQ													0
	(Italy) Diego Spitaleri	KTM							DNQ	DNQ													0
	(France) Wesley Suteau	Gas Gas									DNQ	DNQ											0
	(France) Célestin Renaud	Yamaha									DNQ	DNQ											0
	(France) Valentin Berjaud	Husqvarna									DNQ	DNQ											0
	(Estonia) Bruno Mägi	KTM											DNQ	DNQ									0
	(Sweden) Theo Tidlund	Husqvarna											DNQ	DNQ									0
	(Lithuania) Rojus Zaborskis	Gas Gas											DNQ	DNQ									0
	(Israel) Itamar Amar	Yamaha											DNQ	DNQ									0
	(Portugal) Duarte Pinto	Yamaha													DNQ	DNQ							0
	(Portugal) Bernardo Pinto	Yamaha													DNQ	DNQ							0
	(Spain) Gorka Gardoy	KTM													DNQ	DNQ							0
	(Sweden) Wilhelm Löfgren	KTM																	DNQ	DNQ			0
	(Sweden) Helmer Nilsson	KTM																	DNQ	DNQ			0
	(Germany) Lennard Geidel	Husqvarna																	DNQ	DNQ			0
	(Sweden) Arthur Ejdbring	KTM																	DNQ	DNQ			0
	(Norway) Erling Engeland	KTM																	DNQ	DNQ			0
	(Sweden) Rocco Ekman	Husqvarna																	DNQ	DNQ			0
	(Sweden) Jamie Hammarstig	KTM																	DNQ	DNQ			0
	(Sweden) Casper Eriksson	KTM																	DNQ	DNQ			0
Pos	Rider	Bike	AND (Andalusia)		SUI (Switzerland)		SAR (Sardinia)		TRE		FRA (France)		LAT (Latvia)		POR (Portugal)		GBR (United Kingdom)		SWE (Sweden)		TUR (Turkey)		Points

=== Manufacturers Championship ===
Pos	Bike	AND (Andalusia)		SUI (Switzerland)		SAR (Sardinia)		TRE		FRA (France)		LAT (Latvia)		POR (Portugal)		GBR (United Kingdom)		SWE (Sweden)		TUR (Turkey)		Points
1	KTM	1	3	1	1	1	2	1	1	1	1	1	1	2	1	1	1	1	1	1	1	489
2	Yamaha	2	2	3	10	7	1	2	6	4	2	4	2	1	4	4	2	3	2	3	3	396
3	Fantic	8	1	5	Ret	5	7	4	8	5	4	3	3	3	2	2	5	4	3	4	5	341
4	TM	9	7	6	3	2	10	9	5	3	10	10	11	7	7	12	15	9	8			242
5	Gas Gas	23	28	9	12	Ret	23	23	30	10	17	30	25	5	8	17	10	14	25	9	10	110
6	Husqvarna	14	19	16	11	12	27	18	18	25	Ret	16	15	20	17	15	11	20	26			72
Pos	Bike	AND (Andalusia)		SUI (Switzerland)		SAR (Sardinia)		TRE		FRA (France)		LAT (Latvia)		POR (Portugal)		GBR (United Kingdom)		SWE (Sweden)		TUR (Turkey)		Points

== EMXOpen ==
A 1-round calendar for the 2026 season was announced in October 2025. EMXOpen is for riders competing on 2-stroke and 4-stroke motorcycles up to 450cc.

=== Calendar ===
Round	Date	Grand Prix	Location	Race 1 Winner	Race 2 Winner	Round Winner	Report
1	1–2 August	Flanders	Lommel	(Finland) Jere Haavisto	(Finland) Jere Haavisto	(Finland) Jere Haavisto	

=== Entry list ===
Team	Constructor	No	Rider
	Yamaha	2	(Belgium) Yirre Saenen
RGS Racing Team	Yamaha	7	(Belgium) Junior Bal
	KTM	9	(Belgium) Ken De Dycker
Chambers KTM Racing	KTM	10	(United Kingdom) Harvey Cashmore
SB2 MX Talents Team	Gas Gas	11	(Spain) Gilen Albisua
Racing Center Antwerpen	KTM	15	(Belgium) Enzo Aerden
Racing Center Antwerpen	KTM	35	(Belgium) Brent Aerden
	KTM	21	(Netherlands) Greg van der Weide
Duntep	Husqvarna	30	(Netherlands) Sander Hofstede
JH MX Racing	Gas Gas	34	(Netherlands) Micha-Boy de Waal
JH MX Racing	KTM	136	(Netherlands) Loeka Thonies
Honda Center Eesti	Honda	37	(Estonia) Gert Krestinov
RVH Racing	KTM	38	(Belgium) Ryan Van Hove
SHR Motorsports by Hartje	Yamaha	52	(Sweden) Albin Gerhardsson
	Yamaha	55	(Belgium) Joe Vandereydt
Buitenhuis Racing	Yamaha	77	(Netherlands) Kevin Buitenhuis
GI Cross Racing Team	Husqvarna	86	(Italy) Matteo Del Coco
Motorspeed.no	KTM	89	(Sweden) Markus Sommerstad
Laurense Motors Kawasaki Racing	Kawasaki	94	(Netherlands) Sven van der Mierden
Ducati Racing Team	Ducati	96	(Spain) Víctor Alonso
Team 101%	KTM	101	(Estonia) Erki Kahro
Team Sissen	KTM	115	(Netherlands) Erik de Bruyn
East MX	Gas Gas	116	(Finland) Jere Rönkkö
Van der Velden Motoren	KTM	118	(Netherlands) Joël van Mechelen
Werthmann Racing Team by Mefo Sport	KTM	138	(Denmark) William Kleemann
Werthmann Racing Team by Mefo Sport	Triumph	716	(Germany) Leon Rehberg
Schmicker Silve Racing	KTM	142	(Finland) Jere Haavisto
FRT Racing	KTM	171	(Germany) Fynn-Niklas Tornau
	Gas Gas	181	(Netherlands) Casey Verheije
	KTM	194	(Belgium) Arne Tielens
	KTM	200	(Germany) Dave Abbing
Millionaire Racing Team - Honda RedMoto	Honda	211	(Italy) Nicholas Lapucci
	Honda	223	(France) Alexandre Viltard
	Husqvarna	247	(South Africa) Jean Visser
Nobis MX Team	KTM	303	(Netherlands) Krijn van Vroenhoven
	Yamaha	444	(Netherlands) Jeremy Knuiman
KTM GST Berlin Racing	KTM	470	(Germany) Peter König
Kemco Management / WPM Motors	KTM	484	(Netherlands) Dave Kooiker
Brouwer Motors	KTM	491	(Netherlands) Wessel van Wijk
	Husqvarna	495	(Sweden) Loke Callemo
Care Innovation Racing Team	KTM	521	(Netherlands) Boris Blanken
	KTM	537	(Netherlands) Damian Wedage
Rodeo MX Racing Team	Gas Gas	611	(Latvia) Markuss Kokins
Van der Wardt Bouw	KTM	715	(Netherlands) Jaap Janssen
	KTM	731	(Poland) Damian Zdunek
	Husqvarna	733	(Estonia) Kaarel Tilk
MX88 Motorsport	Husqvarna	801	(Netherlands) Freek van der Vlist
WTX Racing	KTM	815	(Netherlands) Ryan Witlox
	Yamaha	822	(Netherlands) Mike Bolink
Schepers Racing	KTM	880	(Netherlands) Sven Dijk

=== Riders Championship ===
Pos	Rider	Bike	BEL (Flanders)		Points
1	(Finland) Jere Haavisto	KTM	1	1	50
2	(Netherlands) Damien Knuiman	Yamaha	2	2	44
3	(Germany) Peter König	KTM	3	5	36
4	(Latvia) Markuss Kokins	Gas Gas	10	4	29
5	(Netherlands) Dave Kooiker	Gas Gas	6	10	26
6	(Netherlands) Sven van der Mierden	Kawasaki	8	8	26
7	(Estonia) Gert Krestinov	Honda	11	6	25
8	(Estonia) Kaarel Tilk	Husqvarna	12	7	23
9	(Belgium) Junior Bal	Husqvarna	7	13	22
10	(Spain) Víctor Alonso	Ducati	Ret	3	20
11	(Netherlands) Boris Blanken	KTM	13	9	20
12	(Italy) Nicholas Lapucci	Honda	4	Ret	18
13	(Netherlands) Joël van Mechelen	KTM	14	11	17
14	(Sweden) Albin Gerhardsson	Yamaha	5	23	16
15	(Netherlands) Micha-Boy de Waal	Gas Gas	9	18	15
16	(Netherlands) Freek van der Vlist	Husqvarna	16	15	11
17	(Netherlands) Damian Wedage	KTM	24	12	9
18	(Italy) Matteo Del Coco	Husqvarna	17	16	9
19	(Belgium) Brent Aerden	KTM	21	14	7
20	(Netherlands) Jeremy Knuiman	Yamaha	15	20	7
21	(Denmark) William Kleemann	KTM	18	17	7
22	(Finland) Jere Rönkkö	Gas Gas	29	19	2
23	(Netherlands) Loeka Thonies	KTM	19	Ret	2
24	(Netherlands) Sander Hofstede	Husqvarna	20	25	1
	(France) Alexandre Viltard	Honda	22	21	0
	(Germany) Fynn-Niklas Tornau	Husqvarna	Ret	22	0
	(Belgium) Yirre Saenen	Yamaha	23	40	0
	(Spain) Gilen Albisua	Gas Gas	25	24	0
	(Belgium) Ryan Van Hove	Gas Gas	26	36	0
	(Netherlands) Erik de Bruyn	KTM	Ret	26	0
	(Netherlands) Mike Bolink	Yamaha	30	27	0
	(Netherlands) Kevin Buitenhuis	Yamaha	27	32	0
	(Netherlands) Ryan Witlox	KTM	31	28	0
	(Netherlands) Krijn van Vroenhoven	KTM	28	33	0
	(Germany) Leon Rehberg	Triumph	37	29	0
	(Netherlands) Wessel van Wijk	KTM	Ret	30	0
	(Netherlands) Jaap Janssen	KTM	DNQ	31	0
	(Netherlands) Sven Dijk	KTM	32	34	0
	(Sweden) Markus Sommerstad	KTM	33	DNS	0
	(Belgium) Enzo Aerden	KTM	34	35	0
	(Belgium) Ken De Dycker	KTM	35	Ret	0
	(South Africa) Jean Visser	Husqvarna	DNQ	DNQ	0
	(Netherlands) Greg van der Weide	KTM	DNQ	DNQ	0
	(Sweden) Loke Callemo	Husqvarna	DNQ	DNQ	0
	(Belgium) Joe Vandereydt	Yamaha	DNQ	DNQ	0
	(United Kingdom) Harvey Cashmore	KTM	DNQ	DNQ	0
	(Poland) Damian Zdunek	KTM	DNQ	DNQ	0
	(Belgium) Arne Tielens	KTM	DNQ	DNQ	0
	(Netherlands) Casey Verheije	Gas Gas	DNQ	DNQ	0
Pos	Rider	Bike	BEL (Flanders)		Points

=== Manufacturers Championship ===
Pos	Bike	BEL (Flanders)		Points
1	KTM	1	1	50
2	Yamaha	2	2	44
3	Gas Gas	6	4	33
4	Honda	4	6	33
5	Husqvarna	7	7	28
6	Kawasaki	8	8	26
7	Ducati	Ret	3	20
	Triumph	37	29	0
Pos	Bike	BEL (Flanders)		Points

== EMX2T ==
A 1-round calendar for the 2026 season was announced in October 2025. EMX2T is for riders competing on 2-stroke motorcycles of 250cc.

=== Calendar ===
Round	Date	Grand Prix	Location	Race 1 Winner	Race 2 Winner	Round Winner	Report
1	25–26 July	Czech Republic	Loket	(Czech Republic) Václav Kovář	(Czech Republic) Václav Kovář	(Czech Republic) Václav Kovář	

=== Entry list ===
Team	Constructor	No	Rider
	Yamaha	2	(Netherlands) Lars Looman
	Beta	3	(Italy) Tommaso Romano
	Gas Gas	5	(Latvia) Alberts Knapšis
	Yamaha	11	(Finland) Aleksi Vesanto
	Husqvarna	17	(Finland) Jami Knuuttila
	KTM	21	(Netherlands) Greg van der Weide
DM Racing	KTM	25	(Austria) Michael Lackner
	KTM	30	(Netherlands) René de Jong
Beta Motorcycles	Beta	31	(Italy) Francesco Bassi
RVH Racing	KTM	38	(Belgium) Ryan Van Hove
	KTM	46	(Belgium) Mike Roose
JLB Racing Team	Triumph	47	(Belgium) Bryan Boulard
Team Beta MRT Racing	Beta	50	(Italy) Brando Rispoli
Ronnangsgård Racing	Yamaha	63	(Sweden) Erik Frisagård
SMX Racing Team Rudník	KTM	71	(Czech Republic) Pavel Dvořáček
Bud Racing España	Gas Gas	83	(Spain) Bruno Miró
	Beta	84	(Austria) Markus Windhaber
JG MotoproX Racing Team	KTM	90	(Czech Republic) Jiří Hendrych
	KTM	96	(Czech Republic) Jiří Pokorný
	KTM	98	(Netherlands) Dylan Kroon
Becker Racing	KTM	101	(Czech Republic) Václav Kovář
	KTM	102	(Czech Republic) Matyáš Klán
	KTM	105	(Netherlands) Jordan Robbers
Top Cross TCS Racing Team	KTM	110	(Romania) Zoltan Ördög
Orion Racing Team	KTM	111	(Czech Republic) Petr Bartoš
Caparvi Racing Team	Yamaha	122	(Italy) Mirko Dal Bosco
JK Racing Yamaha	Yamaha	124	(Latvia) Jēkabs Kubuliņš
Care Innovation Racing Team	KTM	145	(Netherlands) Jeroen Bussink
Care Innovation Racing Team	KTM	521	(Netherlands) Boris Blanken
Powerhouse Superstore Racing Team	Yamaha	164	(Netherlands) Remy van Alebeek
	KTM	177	(Germany) Jannik Blume
	KTM	182	(Netherlands) Eise Haarsma
KTM GST Berlin Racing	KTM	211	(Germany) Mika Wilke
HTS KTM Racing Team	KTM	214	(Hungary) Bence Pergel
HTS KTM Racing Team	Husqvarna	766	(Austria) Michael Sandner
Yamaha Europe Monster Energy MJC	Yamaha	228	(Italy) Michael Conte
Q Racing Team	Gas Gas	271	(Czech Republic) Stanislav Vašíček
Zauner Racing Team	KTM	319	(Austria) Christoph Zeintl
	Gas Gas	373	(Italy) Alessio Bonetta
Hannamax Motorsport	Yamaha	427	(Netherlands) Mick Kennedy
	KTM	428	(Netherlands) Jelle Bankers
Brouwer Motors	KTM	485	(Netherlands) Senna van Voorst
	Gas Gas	499	(Austria) Marco Heidegger
Motosports Racing Team	Husqvarna	511	(Latvia) Kārlis Kalējs
	KTM	513	(Czech Republic) Stanislav Pojar
M.V. 532 Racing	Gas Gas	532	(Italy) Mirko Valsecchi
	KTM	537	(Netherlands) Damian Wedage
TYK Team Yamaha Knobloch sponsored by A.T.E.C.	Yamaha	576	(Germany) Joel Franz
	Gas Gas	599	(Belgium) Nate Van Tatenhove
Team Castellari	KTM	651	(Italy) Giovanni Meneghello
Van der Wardt Bouw	KTM	715	(Netherlands) Jaap Janssen
Pensini Moto	Beta	752	(Italy) Matteo Borghi
MX88 Motorsport	Husqvarna	801	(Netherlands) Freek van der Vlist
	Yamaha	822	(Netherlands) Mike Bolink
	Gas Gas	841	(Poland) Jakub Kowalski
Schepers Racing	KTM	880	(Netherlands) Sven Dijk
KTM Kosak Team	Fantic	881	(Germany) Cedric Schick
Substance JPR KTM	KTM	957	(United Kingdom) Jake Preston
Austria Suspension Racing	Fantic	991	(Austria) Marvin Salzer

=== Riders Championship ===
Pos	Rider	Bike	CZE (Czech Republic)		Points
1	(Czech Republic) Václav Kovář	KTM	1	1	50
2	(Latvia) Jēkabs Kubuliņš	Yamaha	2	2	44
3	(Italy) Brando Rispoli	Beta	3	3	40
4	(Austria) Marvin Salzer	KTM	5	6	31
5	(Latvia) Kārlis Kalējs	Husqvarna	7	9	26
6	(Netherlands) René de Jong	KTM	9	10	23
7	(Belgium) Bryan Boulard	Triumph	13	7	22
8	(Italy) Mirko Valsecchi	Gas Gas	14	8	20
9	(Czech Republic) Pavel Dvořáček	KTM	11	11	20
10	(Austria) Michael Sandner	Husqvarna	Ret	4	18
11	(Italy) Tommaso Romano	Beta	4	Ret	18
12	(Italy) Francesco Bassi	Beta	Ret	5	16
13	(Spain) Bruno Miró	Gas Gas	6	Ret	15
14	(Netherlands) Freek van der Vlist	Husqvarna	8	32	13
15	(Italy) Giovanni Meneghello	KTM	10	20	12
16	(Netherlands) Boris Blanken	KTM	15	16	11
17	(Netherlands) Mick Kennedy	Yamaha	22	12	9
18	(Romania) Zoltan Ördög	KTM	12	31	9
19	(Italy) Mirko Dal Bosco	Yamaha	18	15	9
20	(Italy) Michael Conte	Yamaha	21	13	8
21	(Austria) Michael Lackner	KTM	20	14	8
22	(Czech Republic) Stanislav Vašíček	Gas Gas	17	18	7
23	(Czech Republic) Petr Bartoš	KTM	19	17	6
24	(Latvia) Alberts Knapšis	Gas Gas	16	21	5
25	(Czech Republic) Stanislav Pojar	KTM	Ret	19	2
	(Netherlands) Remy van Alebeek	Yamaha	27	22	0
	(Italy) Alessio Bonetta	Gas Gas	23	24	0
	(Netherlands) Senna van Voorst	KTM	Ret	23	0
	(Netherlands) Mike Bolink	Yamaha	24	26	0
	(Sweden) Erik Frisagård	Yamaha	25	30	0
	(Belgium) Mike Roose	KTM	32	25	0
	(Germany) Jannik Blume	KTM	26	29	0
	(Netherlands) Jaap Janssen	KTM	DSQ	27	0
	(Poland) Jakub Kowalski	Gas Gas	30	28	0
	(Austria) Christoph Zeintl	KTM	28	Ret	0
	(Italy) Matteo Borghi	Beta	29	Ret	0
	(Netherlands) Dylan Kroon	KTM	31	35	0
	(Czech Republic) Jiří Hendrych	KTM	33	33	0
	(Belgium) Ryan Van Hove	KTM	DNQ	34	0
	(Netherlands) Damian Wedage	KTM	Ret	DNS	0
	(Netherlands) Jelle Bankers	KTM	Ret	DNS	0
	(Hungary) Bence Pergel	KTM	DNS	DNS	0
	(Germany) Cedric Schick	Fantic	DNQ	DNQ	0
	(Austria) Marco Heidegger	Gas Gas	DNQ	DNQ	0
	(Germany) Joel Franz	Yamaha	DNQ	DNQ	0
	(Finland) Aleksi Vesanto	Yamaha	DNQ	DNQ	0
	(United Kingdom) Jake Preston	KTM	DNQ	DNQ	0
	(Netherlands) Sven Dijk	KTM	DNQ	DNQ	0
	(Netherlands) Lars Looman	Yamaha	DNQ	DNQ	0
	(Belgium) Nate Van Tatenhove	Gas Gas	DNQ	DNQ	0
	(Netherlands) Greg van der Weide	KTM	DNQ	DNQ	0
	(Netherlands) Eise Haarsma	KTM	DNQ	DNQ	0
	(Austria) Markus Windhaber	Beta	DNQ	DNQ	0
	(Czech Republic) Jiří Pokorný	KTM	DNQ	DNQ	0
	(Czech Republic) Matyáš Klán	KTM	DNQ	DNQ	0
	(Germany) Mika Wilke	KTM	DNQ	DNQ	0
	(Finland) Jami Knuuttila	Husqvarna	DNQ	DNQ	0
Pos	Rider	Bike	CZE (Czech Republic)		Points

=== Manufacturers Championship ===
Pos	Bike	CZE (Czech Republic)		Points
1	KTM	1	1	50
2	Yamaha	2	2	44
3	Beta	3	3	40
4	Husqvarna	7	4	32
5	Gas Gas	6	8	28
6	Triumph	13	7	22
	Fantic	DNQ	DNQ	0
Pos	Bike	CZE (Czech Republic)		Points

== EMX85 ==
A 1-round calendar for the 2026 season was announced in October 2025. EMX85 is for riders competing on 2-stroke motorcycles of 85cc.

=== Calendar ===
Round	Date	Grand Prix	Location	Race 1 Winner	Race 2 Winner	Round Winner	Report
1	25–26 July	Czech Republic	Loket	(United Kingdom) Harry Dale	(Latvia) Patriks Cīrulis	(Latvia) Patriks Cīrulis	

=== Entry list ===
Team	Constructor	No	Rider
737 Performance KTM/D'stock 41	KTM	216	(France) Timoteï Cez
	Husqvarna	220	(France) Liam Morette
	KTM	225	(Italy) Nico Giacobbe
	KTM	252	(France) Conrad Pinchon
	KTM	261	(France) Ryan Lustenberger
	KTM	276	(Italy) Francesco Moro
	KTM	279	(Italy) Patrick Manfredotti
Team VENUM BUD Racing Kawasaki	Husqvarna	285	(France) Tim Lopes
	KTM	286	(Italy) Simone Proietti
	Gas Gas	293	(Spain) Daniel Herranz Suárez
	KTM	295	(Italy) Anthony Montoneri
DTWorks Bike / Ausió Racing Team	Yamaha	296	(Spain) Biel Vilalta
	KTM	301	(France) Gabriele Lombardo
	Husqvarna	331	(France) Ryan Grondin
	Gas Gas	333	(France) Arthur Annelot
KTM Marseille	KTM	355	(France) Mathys Agullo
	KTM	356	(Italy) Achille Esposito
	Husqvarna	360	(Slovenia) Tim Repnik
618 MX Academy	KTM	366	(Italy) Dominick Maifredi
Sixlyon	Gas Gas	372	(Spain) Eleu José
	TM	394	(France) Timéo Desbordes
Hutten Metaal AK Bouw Racing Junior Team	Husqvarna	400	(Netherlands) Kenzo Jaspers
	KTM	405	(Netherlands) Mike Pijnen
	KTM	420	(United Kingdom) Jett Gardiner
	KTM	424	(United Kingdom) Arthur King
Altherm JCR Yamaha	Yamaha	426	(New Zealand) Nixon Coppins
	KTM	474	(Denmark) Willads Gordon
JL Cox Motorsport	KTM	475	(United Kingdom) Cohen Jagielski
	Gas Gas	493	(Belgium) Xen Temmerman
	KTM	499	(Belgium) Timéo Mohring
	KTM	500	(Netherlands) Kash van Hamond
KMP Honda Racing Team by DVAG	KTM	514	(Germany) Nick de Jong
Chambers KTM Racing	KTM	525	(United Kingdom) Casey Lister
	Gas Gas	532	(Republic of Ireland) Daniel Devine
Yamaha NZ	Yamaha	543	(New Zealand) Jaggar Townley
Kenneth Gundersen MX Team	Husqvarna	561	(Norway) Håkon Rønning
KTM MX Futures	KTM	598	(United Kingdom) Harry Dale
	KTM	620	(Sweden) Emilo Laestander
MX-Handel Husqvarna Racing	Husqvarna	683	(Estonia) Robin Robert Mooses
	KTM	693	(Sweden) Wilmer Lowen
	Gas Gas	700	(Estonia) Theo Kolts
MotoExtreme KTM Eesti	KTM	709	(Estonia) Gregor Lootus
	KTM	728	(Norway) Iver Emilsen
FF Racing Junior Academy	Gas Gas	736	(Sweden) Elliot Lord
Silve Schmicker Racing	Husqvarna	751	(Latvia) Martins Cīrulis
Silve Schmicker Racing	Husqvarna	771	(Latvia) Patriks Cīrulis
	KTM	757	(Lithuania) Eivydas Bartusevičius
RR Nordic	Husqvarna	760	(Sweden) Charlie Schuman
Rodeo Racing Team	Gas Gas	789	(Latvia) Rūdolfs Spila
	KTM	797	(Estonia) Johann Hansman

=== Riders Championship ===
Pos	Rider	Bike	CZE (Czech Republic)		Points
1	(Latvia) Patriks Cīrulis	Husqvarna	6	1	40
2	(Estonia) Robin Robert Mooses	Husqvarna	3	3	40
3	(Latvia) Martins Cīrulis	Husqvarna	2	4	40
4	(United Kingdom) Harry Dale	KTM	1	6	40
5	(France) Artur Annelot	Gas Gas	5	2	38
6	(Estonia) Theo Kolts	Gas Gas	4	7	32
7	(France) Tim Lopes	Husqvarna	11	5	26
8	(New Zealand) Jaggar Townley	Yamaha	10	8	24
9	(Netherlands) Kenzo Jaspers	Husqvarna	8	12	22
10	(United Kingdom) Cohen Jagielski	KTM	7	18	17
11	(Italy) Anthony Montoneri	KTM	16	10	16
12	(Italy) Dominick Maifredi	KTM	18	9	15
13	(France) Liam Morette	Husqvarna	13	15	14
14	(Norway) Iver Emilsen	KTM	14	16	12
15	(France) Mathys Agullo	KTM	9	32	12
16	(Italy) Patrick Manfredotti	KTM	17	14	11
17	(Italy) Simone Proietti	KTM	23	11	10
18	(New Zealand) Nixon Coppins	Yamaha	12	26	9
19	(United Kingdom) Jett Gardiner	KTM	28	13	8
20	(United Kingdom) Arthur King	KTM	19	17	6
21	(Belgium) Timéo Mohring	KTM	15	37	6
22	(Lithuania) Eivydas Bartusevičius	KTM	24	19	2
23	(Italy) Nico Giacobbe	KTM	21	20	1
24	(France) Ryan Grondin	Husqvarna	20	25	1
	(Italy) Franceso Moro	KTM	26	21	0
	(Slovenia) Tim Repnik	Husqvarna	27	22	0
	(Netherlands) Mike Pijnen	KTM	22	23	0
	(Italy) Achille Esposito	KTM	Ret	24	0
	(Sweden) Eliot Lord	Gas Gas	25	27	0
	(Germany) Nick de Jong	KTM	36	28	0
	(France) Conrad Pinchon	KTM	38	29	0
	(Spain) Eleu José	Gas Gas	29	30	0
	(Spain) Daniel Herranz Suárez	Gas Gas	30	33	0
	(Sweden) Wilmer Lowen	KTM	33	31	0
	(France) Timoteï Cez	KTM	31	38	0
	(Norway) Håkon Rønning	Husqvarna	32	Ret	0
	(Sweden) Charlie Schuman	Husqvarna	34	36	0
	(Latvia) Rūdolfs Spila	Gas Gas	37	34	0
	(Spain) Biel Vilalta	Yamaha	35	35	0
	(United Kingdom) Casey Lister	KTM	Ret	Ret	0
	(Denmark) Willads Gordon	Yamaha	DNQ	DNQ	0
	(France) Gabriele Lombardo	KTM	DNQ	DNQ	0
	(Sweden) London Linner	KTM	DNQ	DNQ	0
	(France) Jordan Valsesia	Gas Gas	DNQ	DNQ	0
	(France) Timéo Desbordes	TM	DNQ	DNQ	0
	(Belgium) Xen Temmerman	Gas Gas	DNQ	DNQ	0
	(Sweden) Emilo Laestander	KTM	DNQ	DNQ	0
	(Estonia) Johann Hansman	KTM	DNQ	DNQ	0
	(Slovakia) Matej Masar	KTM	DNQ	DNQ	0
	(Italy) Riccardo Galia	KTM	DNQ	DNQ	0
Pos	Rider	Bike	CZE (Czech Republic)		Points

=== Manufacturers Championship ===
Pos	Bike	CZE (Czech Republic)		Points
1	Husqvarna	2	1	47
2	KTM	1	6	40
3	Gas Gas	4	2	40
4	Yamaha	10	8	24
	TM	DNQ	DNQ	0
Pos	Bike	CZE (Czech Republic)		Points

== EMX65 ==
A 1-round calendar for the 2026 season was announced in October 2025. EMX86 is for riders competing on 2-stroke motorcycles of 65cc.

=== Calendar ===
Round	Date	Grand Prix	Location	Race 1 Winner	Race 2 Winner	Round Winner	Report
1	25–26 July	Czech Republic	Loket	(France) Lucas Bos	(United Kingdom) Jack Waters	(United Kingdom) Jack Waters	

=== Entry list ===
Team	Constructor	No	Rider
	KTM	5	(Serbia) Viktor Kolnookov
	Yamaha	11	(Greece) Dimitris Fotopoulos
Kippen MX Racing Team	Gas Gas	12	(Bulgaria) Nikolay Pavlov
	Husqvarna	27	(Serbia) Vuk Vojnić Hajduk
Dirtbike MX Racing Team	Gas Gas	146	(Bulgaria) Georgi Iliev
	Yamaha	207	(Croatia) Rok Ćebović
	KTM	211	(Austria) Ryan Gabriel
	KTM	219	(Italy) Daniel Corda
	KTM	227	(Spain) Gines Alacid
	Gas Gas	247	(Spain) Adan Quesada
	Gas Gas	273	(Spain) Alonso Tribaldos
	KTM	287	(France) Swan Gourgouilhon
BUD Racing Academy	KTM	289	(France) Lucas Bos
	KTM	307	(Italy) Jacopo Pioggia
	Yamaha	310	(Slovenia) Matic Maček
	KTM	313	(Italy) Federico Leta
	Cobra	315	(Slovenia) Maks Sedlašek
	Husqvarna	318	(Spain) Óscar Martínez
	KTM	327	(France) Naïm Aouadi
	KTM	331	(Italy) Pietro Piraccini
	Yamaha	337	(Spain) Hugo Blascos
	Gas Gas	350	(France) César Lagut
	KTM	394	(France) Livio Piva
	Yamaha	400	(Denmark) Vitus Horsebog
3 flo Madison Crescent Yamaha	Yamaha	412	(United Kingdom) Tommy Wood
	KTM	417	(Belgium) Ferre Vreven
	KTM	428	(Germany) Bruno Lenarz
	KTM	455	(United Kingdom) Jack Waters
	KTM	463	(Netherlands) Cas Klein Kromhof
	KTM	483	(Czech Republic) Benedikt Svoboda
Gas Gas Belgium / Euromatec	Gas Gas	510	(Belgium) Oscar Goblet
	Gas Gas	517	(Netherlands) Demy Hermes
	Gas Gas	525	(Netherlands) Madden Visser
	KTM	541	(Belgium) Roan Calado Reyes
	Gas Gas	545	(Czech Republic) Milan Rubeš
	KTM	555	(Germany) Matteo Bauten
EHR Racing / Dikker B.V.	Gas Gas	594	(Netherlands) Bas Verspaandonk
	Yamaha	606	(Finland) Felix Lind
	Husqvarna	640	(Estonia) Mattias Asi
	Husqvarna	641	(Estonia) Simon Asi
	Gas Gas	661	(Estonia) Martin-Markus Ansi
	Husqvarna	666	(Sweden) Elis Isidorsson
	KTM	684	(Poland) Filip Juszczyk
	KTM	709	(Estonia) Jaan Aron Vahter
MX for Life Stara Gwardia	Yamaha	712	(Poland) Tymon Andrzejewski
	Husqvarna	715	(Latvia) Roberts Vanags
	KTM	723	(Sweden) Hayden Tuovinen
	Husqvarna	729	(Latvia) Daniils Hohlovs
	Gas Gas	754	(Latvia) Bruno Geitus
Motosports Racing Team	Husqvarna	773	(Latvia) Valters Jurcenko

=== Riders Championship ===
Pos	Rider	Bike	CZE (Czech Republic)		Points
1	(United Kingdom) Jack Waters	KTM	2	1	47
2	(Spain) Gines Alacid	KTM	3	4	38
3	(Latvia) Bruno Geitus	Gas Gas	10	2	33
4	(Poland) Filip Juszczyk	KTM	5	5	32
5	(Sweden) Elis Isidorsson	Husqvarna	7	6	29
6	(Bulgaria) Georgi Illiev	Gas Gas	9	7	26
7	(Netherlands) Bas Verspaandonk	Gas Gas	8	8	26
8	(France) Lucas Bos	KTM	1	20	26
9	(Spain) Alonso Tribaldos	Gas Gas	6	12	24
10	(Spain) Adan Quesada	Gas Gas	20	3	21
11	(Italy) Daniel Corda	KTM	4	Ret	18
12	(Italy) Jacopo Pioggia	KTM	16	9	17
13	(Czech Republic) Milan Rubeš	Gas Gas	14	13	15
15	(Estonia) Martin-Markus Ansi	Gas Gas	19	10	13
15	(United Kingdom) Tommy Wood	Yamaha	34	11	10
16	(Sweden) Hayden Tuovinen	KTM	13	19	10
17	(Bulgaria) Nikolay Pavlov	Gas Gas	11	25	10
18	(Italy) Pietro Piraccini	KTM	17	16	9
19	(Germany) Bruno Lenarz	KTM	12	Ret	9
20	(Netherlands) Madden Visser	Gas Gas	27	14	7
21	(Belgium) Oscar Goblet	Gas Gas	18	17	7
22	(Latvia) Valters Jurcenko	Husqvarna	32	15	6
23	(Netherlands) Demy Hermes	Gas Gas	15	DNS	6
24	(Serbia) Viktor Kolnookov	KTM	35	18	3
	(Spain) Óscar Martínez	Husqvarna	21	21	0
	(Slovenia) Matic Maček	Yamaha	22	22	0
	(Poland) Tymon Andrzejewski	Yamaha	23	23	0
	(France) Livio Piva	KTM	26	24	0
	(Latvia) Roberts Vanags	Husqvarna	24	30	0
	(France) Naïm Aouadi	KTM	25	32	0
	(Austria) Ryan Gabriel	KTM	39	26	0
	(Spain) Hugo Blascos	Yamaha	30	27	0
	(France) Swan Gourgouilhon	KTM	28	33	0
	(Belgium) Ferre Vreven	KTM	37	28	0
	(Estonia) Jaan Aron Vahter	KTM	31	29	0
	(Latvia) Daniils Hohlovs	Husqvarna	29	35	0
	(Netherlands) Cas Klein Kromhof	Gas Gas	Ret	31	0
	(Greece) Dimitris Fotopoulos	Yamaha	33	36	0
	(Croatia) Rok Ćebović	Yamaha	38	34	0
	(Estonia) Simon Asi	Husqvarna	36	37	0
	(Finland) Felix Lind	Yamaha	DNQ	DNQ	0
	(Denmark) Vitus Horsebog	Yamaha	DNQ	DNQ	0
	(Germany) Matteo Bauten	KTM	DNQ	DNQ	0
	(Czech Republic) Benedikt Svoboda	KTM	DNQ	DNQ	0
	(Slovenia) Maks Sedlašek	Cobra	DNQ	DNQ	0
	(Belgium) Roan Calado Reyes	KTM	DNQ	DNQ	0
	(France) Cesar Lagut	Gas Gas	DNQ	DNQ	0
	(Italy) Federico Leta	KTM	DNQ	DNQ	0
	(Estonia) Mattias Asi	Husqvarna	DNQ	DNQ	0
	(Serbia) Vuk Vojnić Hajduk	Husqvarna	DNQ	DNQ	0
Pos	Rider	Bike	CZE (Czech Republic)		Points

=== Manufacturers Championship ===
Pos	Bike	CZE (Czech Republic)		Points
1	KTM	1	1	50
2	Gas Gas	6	2	37
3	Husqvarna	7	6	29
4	Yamaha	22	11	10
	Cobra	DNQ	DNQ	0
Pos	Bike	CZE (Czech Republic)		Points
