= Beta (motorcycle manufacturer) =

Italian motorcycle manufacturer

Betamotor S.p.A.
- Type: Private
- Industry: Motorcycle manufacturing
- Founded: 1904; 122 years ago, Florence
- Founder: Giuseppe Bianchi, Arrigo Tosi
- Headquarters: Rignano sull'Arno, Italy
- Area served: Worldwide
- Website: www.betamotor.com

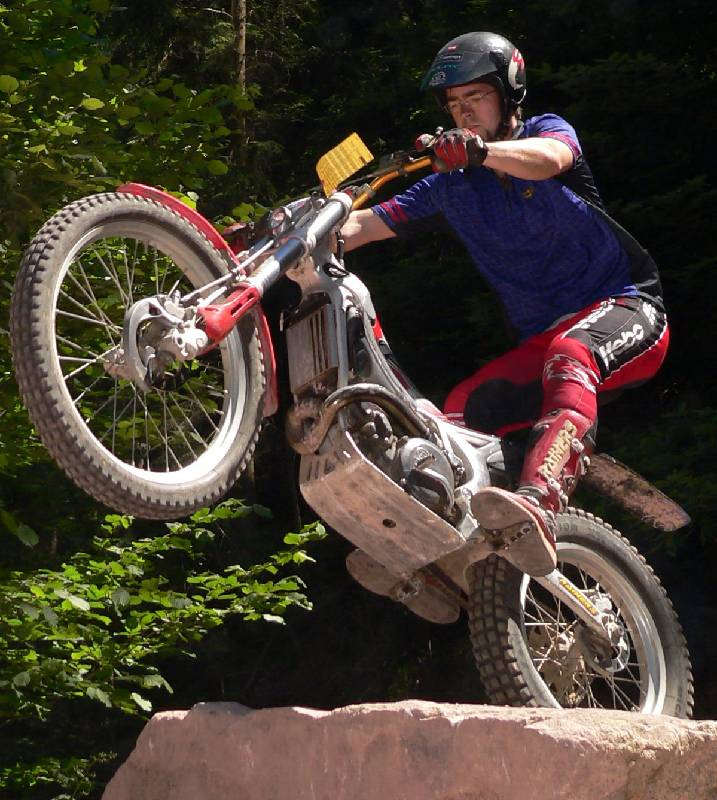
A 2000 Beta Rev 3

Beta is an Italian motorcycle manufacturer, specialising in off-road motorcycles. In 2005, they launched a range of enduro motorcycles using KTM engines. In 2010 they introduced their redesigned RR series, with a new engine developed in-house. Beta is also known for their popular trials bikes. Beta motorcycles have been used by world trials champions such as Jordi Tarrés, Dougie Lampkin, Albert Cabestany and Enduro riders Steve Holcombe and Brad Freeman. Production in 2018 was expected to be in excess of 20,000 motorcycles, ranging in size from 50 cc to 480 cc.

== History ==
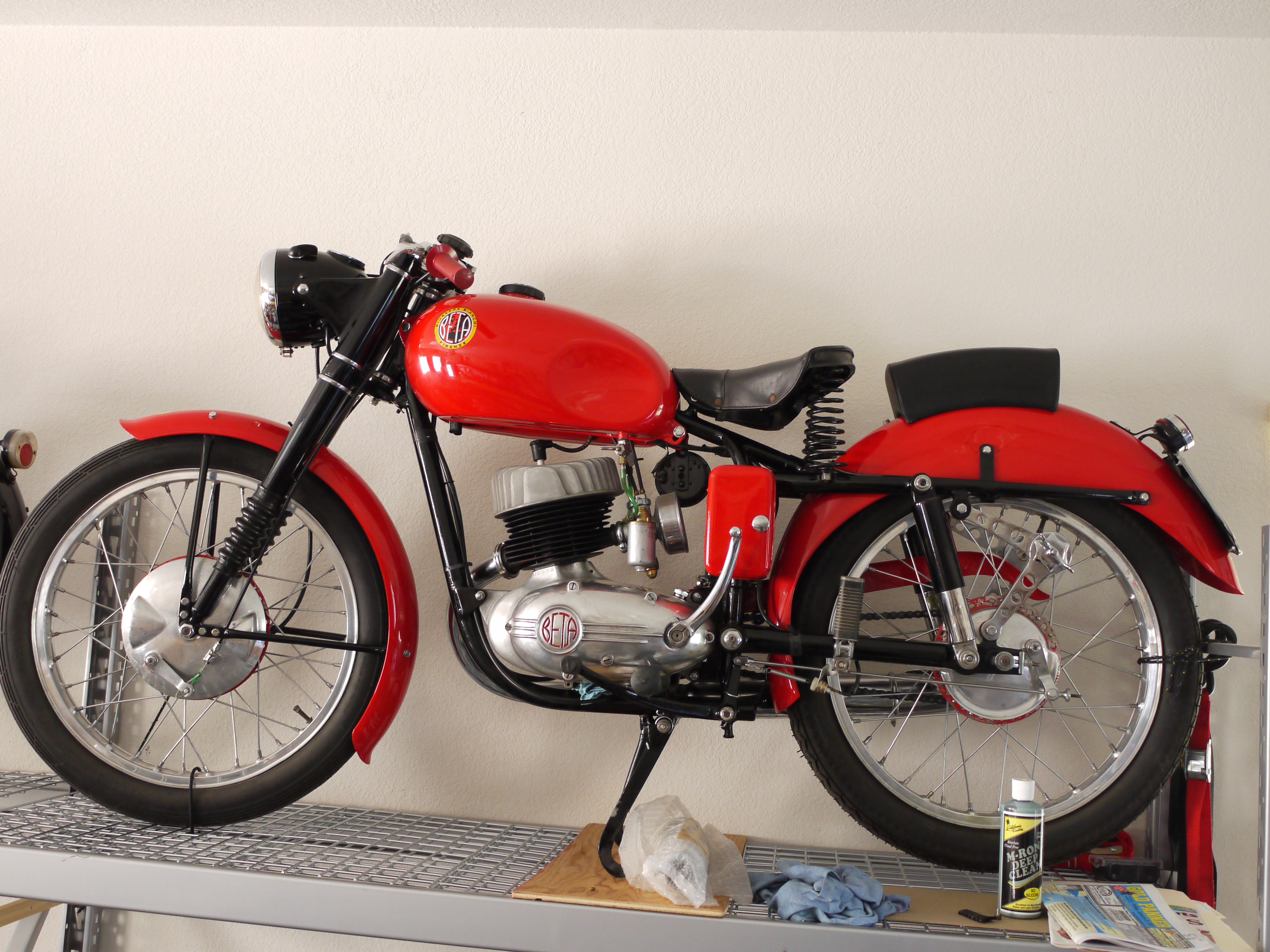
Beta 160 Vulcano Sport, 1955

Beta has its origins in 1904 as a bicycle manufacturing company named "Società Giuseppe Bianchi", originally based in the town of Via Bellariva and later moved to Florence. The name Beta comes from the initials of Bianchi, Enzo and Tosi, Arrigo who ran the company at that time. Currently, the company is run by Lapo Bianchi great-grandson of Giuseppe Bianchi the company founder. The company started developing motorcycles in 1948. Their first attempt was the 1950 "Ital" powered by a 125cc British JAP engine. The following year the first "Beta" branded motorcycle replaced the Ital with a German engine. In 1952 they began to use engines produced by FBM (Note: FMB is an initialism for Fabbrica Bolognese Motocicli referring to a defunct Italian manufacturer of motorcycle engines for other companies."), a company created by Franco Morini, nephew of Alfonso Morini and Vittorio Minarelli. The FBM engines intended for Beta, were customized with the Beta logo on the side covers. In 1956 FBM ceased operation and beta engine production passed to Motori Franco Morini. Focusing on two-stroke street bikes through the 1950s and 1960s, the company began development and production of motocross motorcycles in the late 1960s with the introduction of the 100 cc motocross model XC-100 in 1967. In 1972 Beta moved its factory from Florence to Rignano sull'Arno and gained space for off-road test tracks. Their entry into the trials competition market began in 1980 with the development of their popular and successful two-stroke trials bikes. In 2004 Beta entered the 4-stroke enduro market with bikes using KTM motors. By the 2010s they were producing both two-stroke and four-stroke off-road bikes with Beta designed motors.

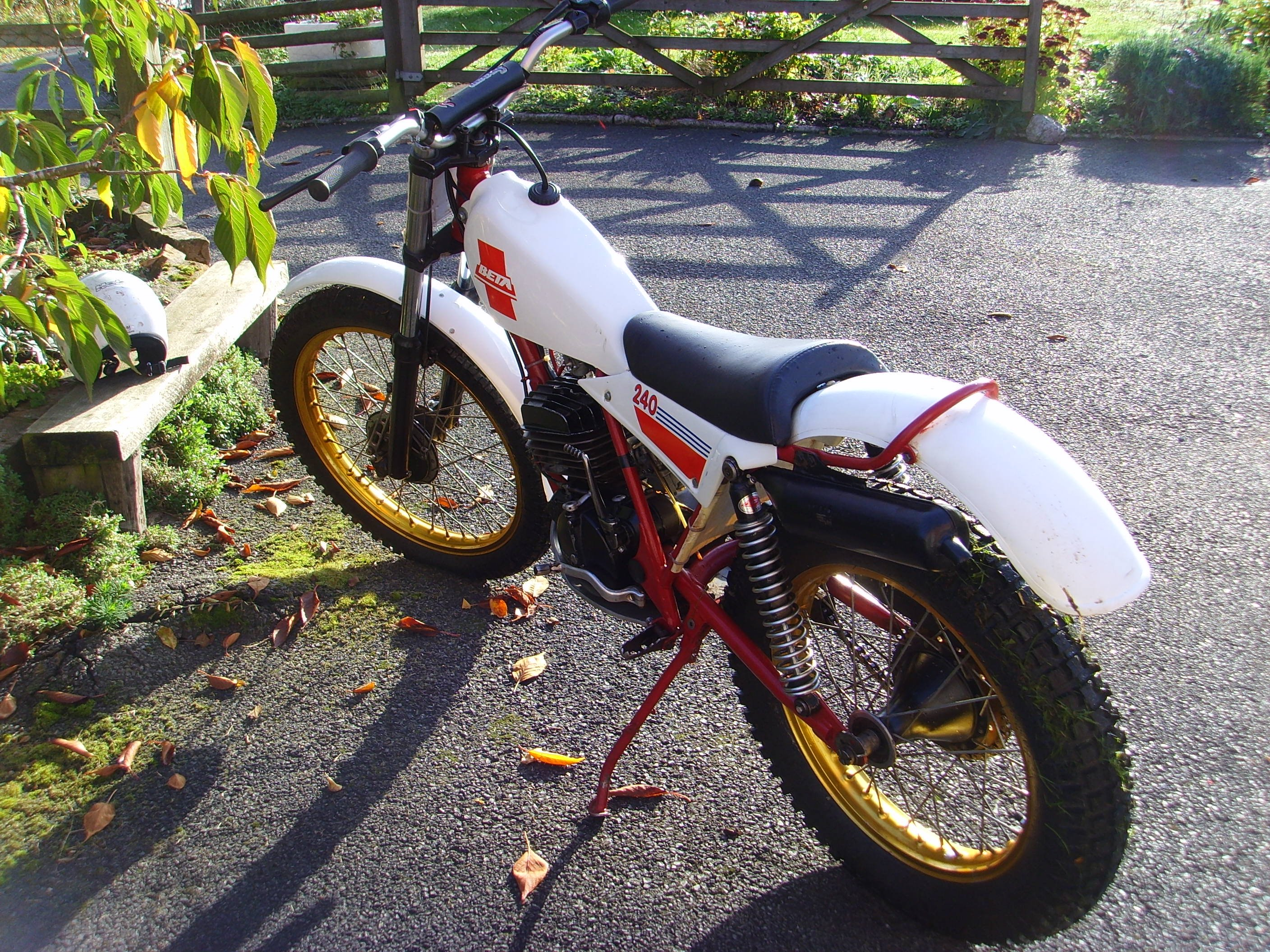
A 1983 Beta TR240, 200cc air-cooled engine, twinshock suspension

Notable Beta riders include Jim Pomeroy, Gilbert De Roover, Ivan Bessone and Jeremy Van Horebeek in motocross, and Jordi Tarrés and Dougie Lampkin in observed trials. Beta motorcycle riders Steve Holcombe and Brad Freeman collectively have won six (2017–2023) EnduroGP Enduro World Championships.

== Trials models ==
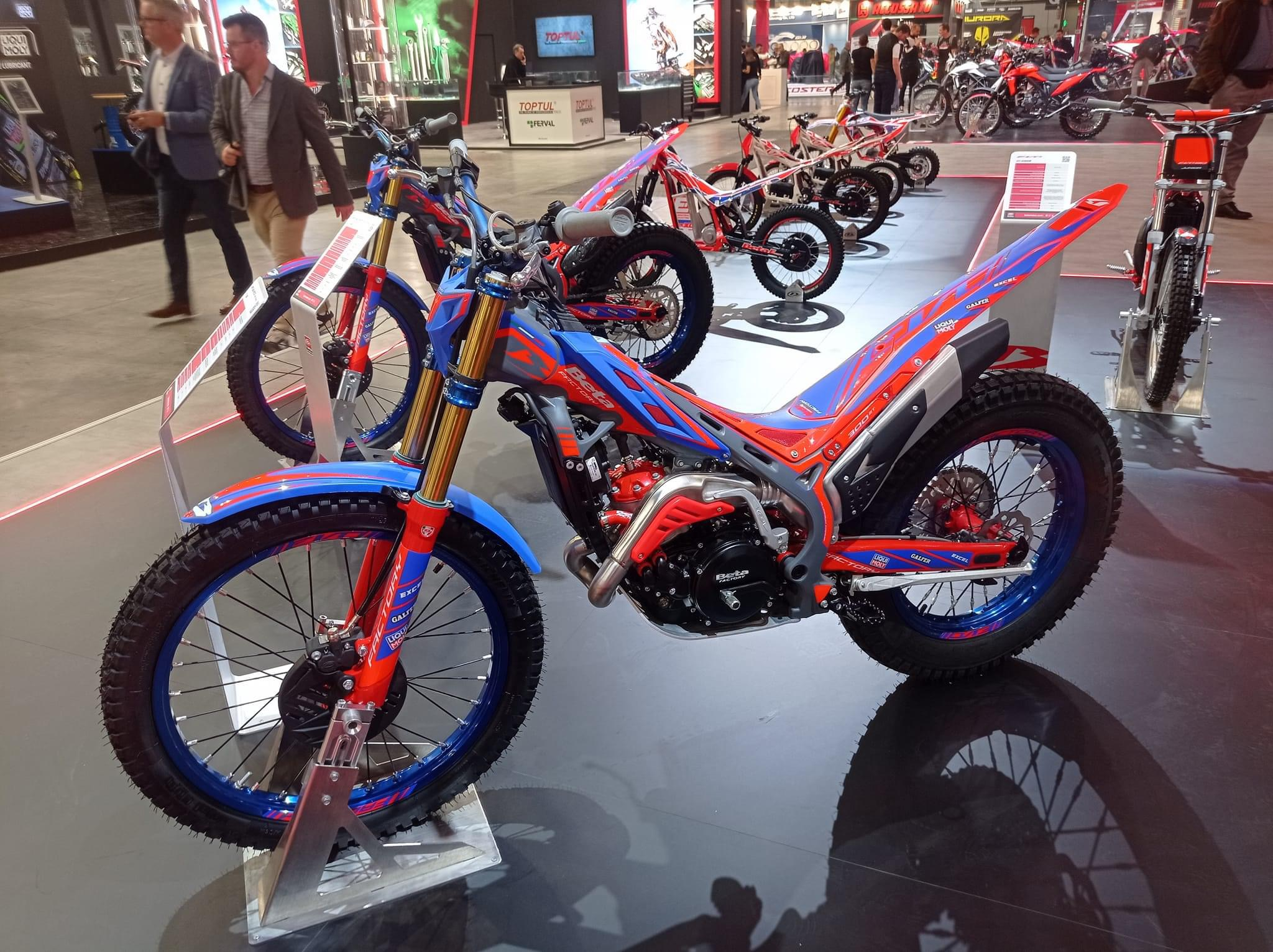
2025 Beta Evo Factory 300

Beta has produced motorcycles for observed trials since the early 1980s and is now one of the leading manufacturers. All trials bikes use Beta's in-house design engines.

- TR240 (1983–1984) First trials model, twinshock suspension 125 cc, 200 cc engines, the majority with reed valve induction.
- TR32, (1984–1985) Air-cooled, monoshock model, produced in parallel with the twinshock model, same engine as TR240
- TR33, (1985–1986)
- TR34, (1986–1989) Very successful trials model, stripey paintwork, 125 cc - 260 cc engines
- TR35, (1989–1991) Air-cooled engine series
- Zero, (1989–1992) Water-cooled monoshock, integral fuel tank
- Synt, (1992–1994) Water-cooled monoshock
- SuperTrial, (1992–1993) Air-cooled engine
- Gara, (1993–1994)
- Techno, (1994–1999) 125 cc version from 1995
- Rev-3, (1999–2008) 2-stroke trials
- Rev-4, (2007–2008) 4-stroke trials
- Evo, (2009–present) 80cc 2-stroke and 300cc 4-stroke
- Sincro, (2026–present) 125, 200, 250 & 300 cc 2-stroke trials

== Enduro models ==
Beta "enduro" models currently include the entry level 2T "X-trainers", 2T and 4T "RR" off-road models, 4T "RC" racers, as well as the 4T "RS" dual-sports.

=== Small Displacement Versions ===
The predecessor of the enduro betas was the Beta RK6 produced from 1993 to 1997. It had a 50 cc 2T engine. From 1998 to 2001 the RK6 became the RR 50, a liquid cooled, carburetor equipped, pre-mix, two-stroke. It sported dual radiators, an adjustable Paioli mono shock, adjustable 41mm USD forks, disc brakes and weighed 80kg dry. In 2002 the RR 50 sported a Minarelli Am6 oil injected, 2T engine and in 2003 gained an aluminum frame.

The 2006 to 2009 RR 125 had an engine based on an air cooled, brazilian, late 1970s, 4T Yamaha. In 2010 the RR 125 gained a liquid cooled engine produced by Yamaha/Minarelli.

=== 2004-2009 RFS Motors ===
Introduced in 2004 the chrome-moly framed enduro bikes (with 250, 400, 450, 525 RFS (Note: RFS is an initialism for Racing Four Stroke referring to a series of KTM designed engines.") motors) came equipped with Nissin brakes and rotors, Marzocchi forks, and a Sachs rear shock.

For 2007 the RR models were upgraded with a removable clutch sub-cover, upgraded front fork settings, and a redesigned rear swing arm.

2008 introduced the RS models built for the American market. The RS model was the street legal version of the RR model and came in 400 cc, 450 cc and 525 cc versions.

2009 saw the introduction of the first "Factory" or Race editions. The race edition included upgrades such as a titanium exhaust, Marzocchi closed cartridge forks, billet triple clamps and a carbon fiber skid plate. 2009 was the last year of the RFS (KTM sourced) motors.

=== 2010-2014 1st Generation Beta Motors ===
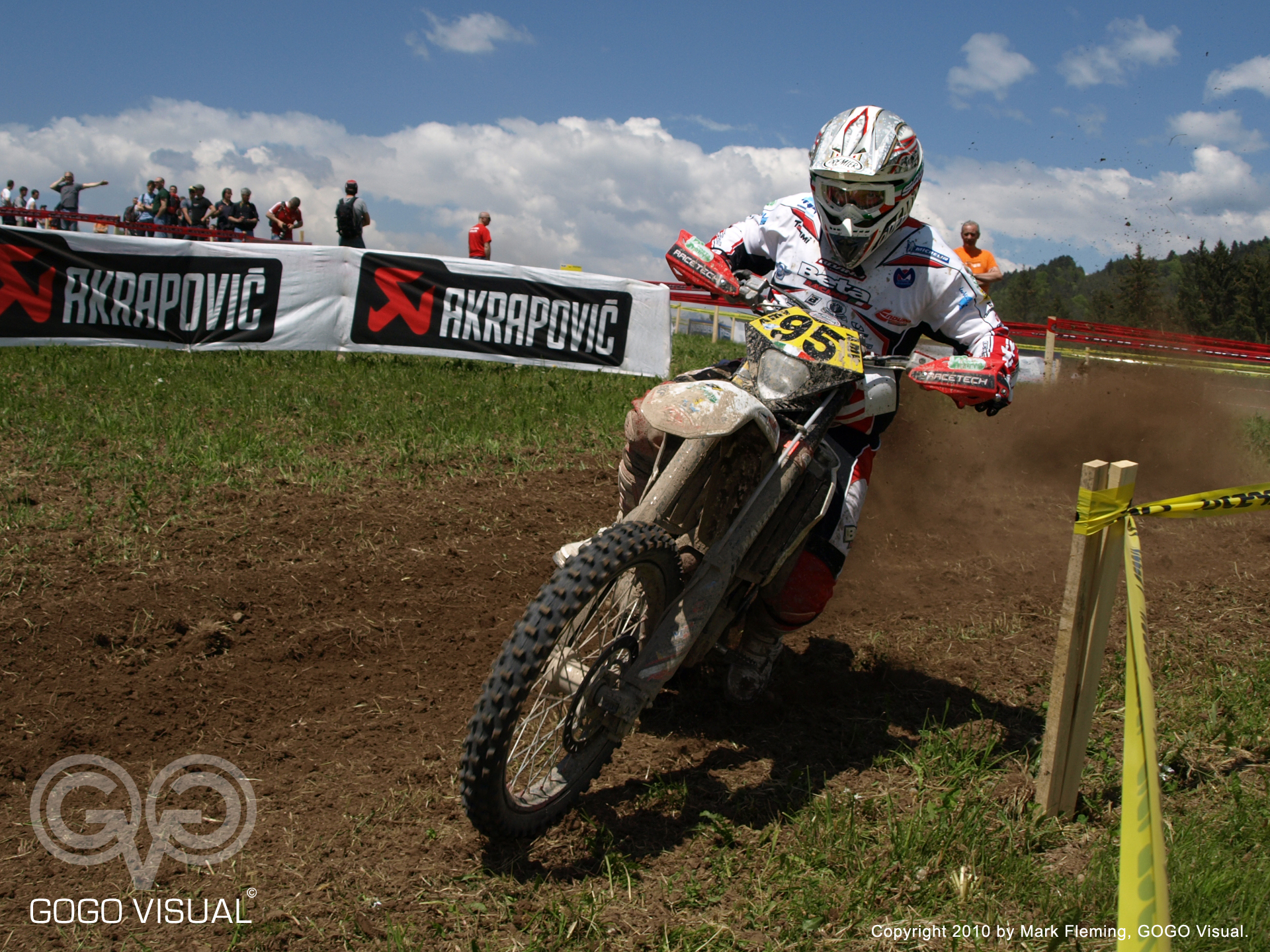
Beta E3 bike at the 2010 WEC GP of Italy

Starting in 2010 in-house designed, carbureted motors appeared in their enduro bike line. All 400 cc, 450 cc and 520 cc (actually 498cc) four-strokes have DOHC, separate engine and transmission lubricants, Nissin brakes, Brembo hydraulic clutches, Excel Takasago rims and six-speed gear boxes. Beta introduces tooless air filter access and push-button seat removal.

2011 saw the introduction of the in-house motors in the RS (dual-sport) models and introduced the 350 cc motor. RS bikes have slightly different frame geometry resulting shorter wheelbases (58.1 vs 58.7 for RRs) and lower seat heights (36.6 vs 36.8 for RRs). All RS dual-sport bikes sold in the United States come standard with the TrailTech Voyager GPS.

The 2012 motors were available in 350, 400, 450, and 498 cc. 2012 also saw the introduction of the Sachs forks and rear shock on the RR models. A 2012 only cross country version of the 450 was offered with Marzocchi closed cartridge forks and a Sachs rear shock with a special link for longer travel.

2013 saw the introduction of the 300RR 2-stroke sporting Marzocchi closed cartridge forks and a Sachs rear shock. The 350 RS sported 45 mm Marzocchi USD (Note: USD is an initialism for UpSide Down when referring to telescopic forks on modern motorcycles.") forks.

2014 saw the addition of a 250 cc motor to the RR 2-stroke line.

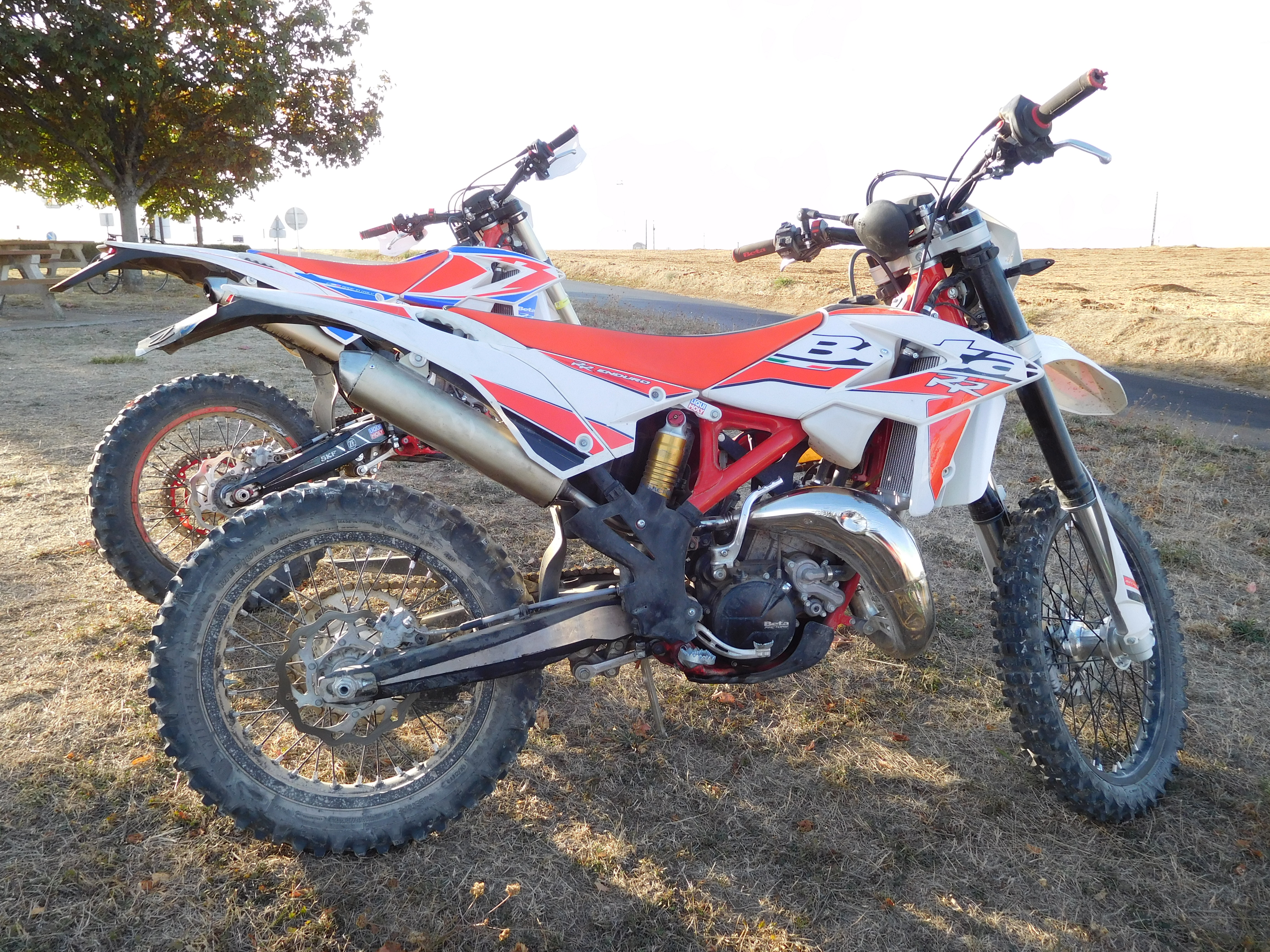
A 2018 Beta 125 RR

The 2014 "Race Edition" bikes made use of 48 mm Marzocchi closed cartridge forks.

=== 2015-2019 Improved Perfect Displacement Motors ===
2015 saw the introduction of new engine displacements. The displacement of the 350 was unchanged. The 400 was reduced to 390, the 450 reduced to 430 and the 498 was reduced to 480 to provide the same horsepower and torque as the 2014 models yet with more “usable” power. Beta engineers call these the "perfect displacements.” The RS (dual-sport) models were available in the 390, 430 and 480 (labeled 500) displacements. 2015 also saw the introduction of the X-trainer 300 cc 2-stroke employing oil injection. Fuel injection was introduced to the 350 cc 4-stroke.

2016 saw the addition of the 350 to the RS line. Oil injection was added to the 250 and 300 2-strokes. The remaining 4-strokes 390, 430 and 480/500 received fuel injection. All 4-stroke models now come with plastic skid plates and translucent fuel tanks.

In 2017 all bikes gained the convenient push button electric start. The RS models are rebranded RR-S and gained USFS spark arrestors. The bikes designated RR-S are full-on versions of their electric start, fuel-injected, four-stroke dirt bikes, outfitted with the bare minimum required for a license plate. RR race edition bikes gained the new Sachs closed cartridge forks. Beta also introduced lithium-ion batteries, while the RR-S models became electric start only with the option of an add-on kick starter.

2019 saw the introduction of the carburetor equipped 200 to the RR 2-stroke line. All models of the RR line 200, 250 and 300 gained electric start. The 125 RR-S gained electric start while 125 RR remained kick start only.

Through 2019 all RR-S models included an AGM battery, a 200 W stator, handlebar-mounted ignition map switch, fold-away mirrors, ZF Sachs SFF (Note: SFF is an initialism for Single Function Fork when referring to a design where one fork leg controls compression dampening and the other controls rebound dampening..") forks and a factory-installed radiator fan. The RR models are the "race editions" featuring performance tweaks and stiffer suspensions but no street gear.

=== 2020-Present ===
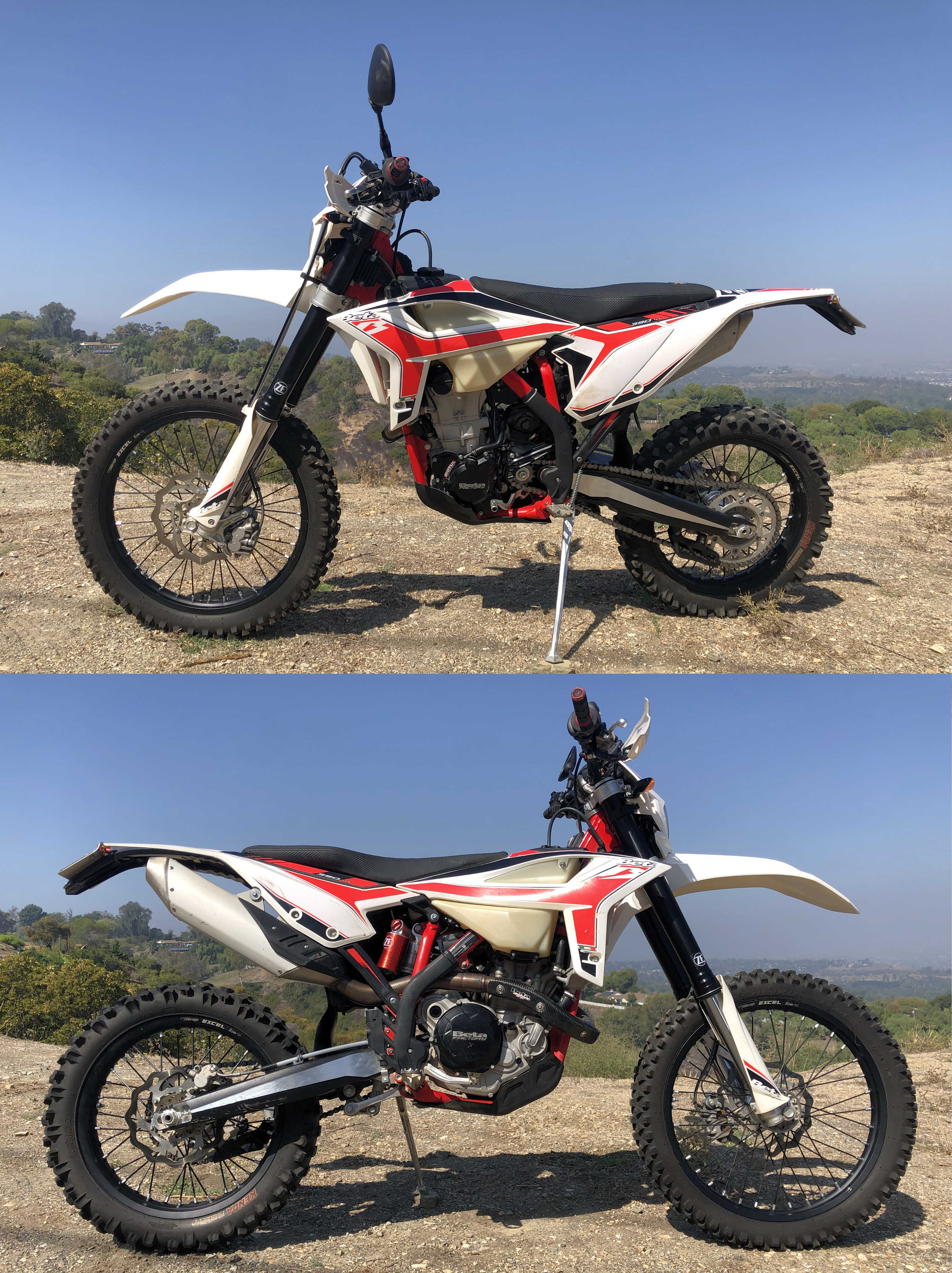
Beta 390 RR-S Dual-sport 2020 model with owner modifications

For the 2020 model year Beta revamped their "Perfect Displacement" four-stroke once again. The new motors alter the crank shaft position and add twin fuel injectors allowing implementation of specialized EFI mapping to increase engine performance and mixture control. The 250 cc and 300 cc 2-stroke motors (including X-trainers) gained a counter-balancer. The RR "Race Edition" bikes were offered with optional Gold KYB closed cartridge forks.

The 2021 200 RR Race Edition, drops the oil injection in favor of pre-mix to shed weight.

2022 models saw only small changes.

2023 Saw the reintroduction of the "RR" models into the US market after six years of only the RR racing editions being offered. All Beta four-strokes gained traction control in addition to dual mappings. Compression and rebound performance was improved in the Sachs ZF forks.

2024 dual sport models were renamed back to the original RS designations. Other changes include: new radiators to improve turning radius, softer seats, improved front brake lines and upgraded Sachs SFF front suspension.

2025 the "RR" enduro models are replaced in the lineup by the "Single-Track Off Road" RR X-PRO models. They also introduced the 450 RC an off-road race bike based on the 450 RX motocross model. Beta did not offer the RS dual sport models in 2025.

2026 the RS dual sport line has an updated frame, X-trig handlebar mounts and exhaust with a removable spark arrestor and now comes with Mitas’ Enduro Trail XT+ tires.

2027 introduces the Xtrainer 200. The 2027 RR Race 4T models gain an LED headlight, quick shift, launch control and toolless adjustment on the rear shock and also transition to the race bike engine cases, consequently lacking the ability of installing an optional kick starter (E-start only).

Beta "US" off-road bikes by type
2-stroke Enduro	2-stroke Race Edition	4-stroke Enduro	4-stroke Race Edition	4-stroke Dual-sport
125 RR X-PRO	125 RR Race			
200 RR X-PRO	200 RR Race	350 RR X-PRO	350 RR Race	350 RS
250 RR X-PRO	250 RR Race	390 RR X-PRO	390 RR Race	390 RS
300 RR X-PRO	300 RR Race	430 RR X-PRO	430 RR Race	430 RS
X-Trainer 200 (Note: 250 cc 2020-2026, replaced by 200 in 2027")		480 RR X-PRO	480 RR Race	500 RS
X-Trainer 300			450 RC	

== Motocross models ==
For 2021 Beta introduced the 300 RX motocross bike with a 19" rear wheel and other enhancements geared to the sport of Motocross. They also entered 2021 and 2022 MXGP series with a new 450 RX. As of 2023, Alessandro Lupino and Ben Watson were part of the European team.

2024 saw the entry of Beta into the AMA 450 pro supercross/motocross series. Riders Benny Bloss (67) and Colt Nichols (45) rode for the Liqui Moly Beta team.

The 2025 Liqui Moly Beta Factory Supercross Team replaced Colt Nichols with rider Mitchell Oldenburg (49). The Motocross team added riders Clayton Tucker, Dare DeMartile and Bryson Gardner.

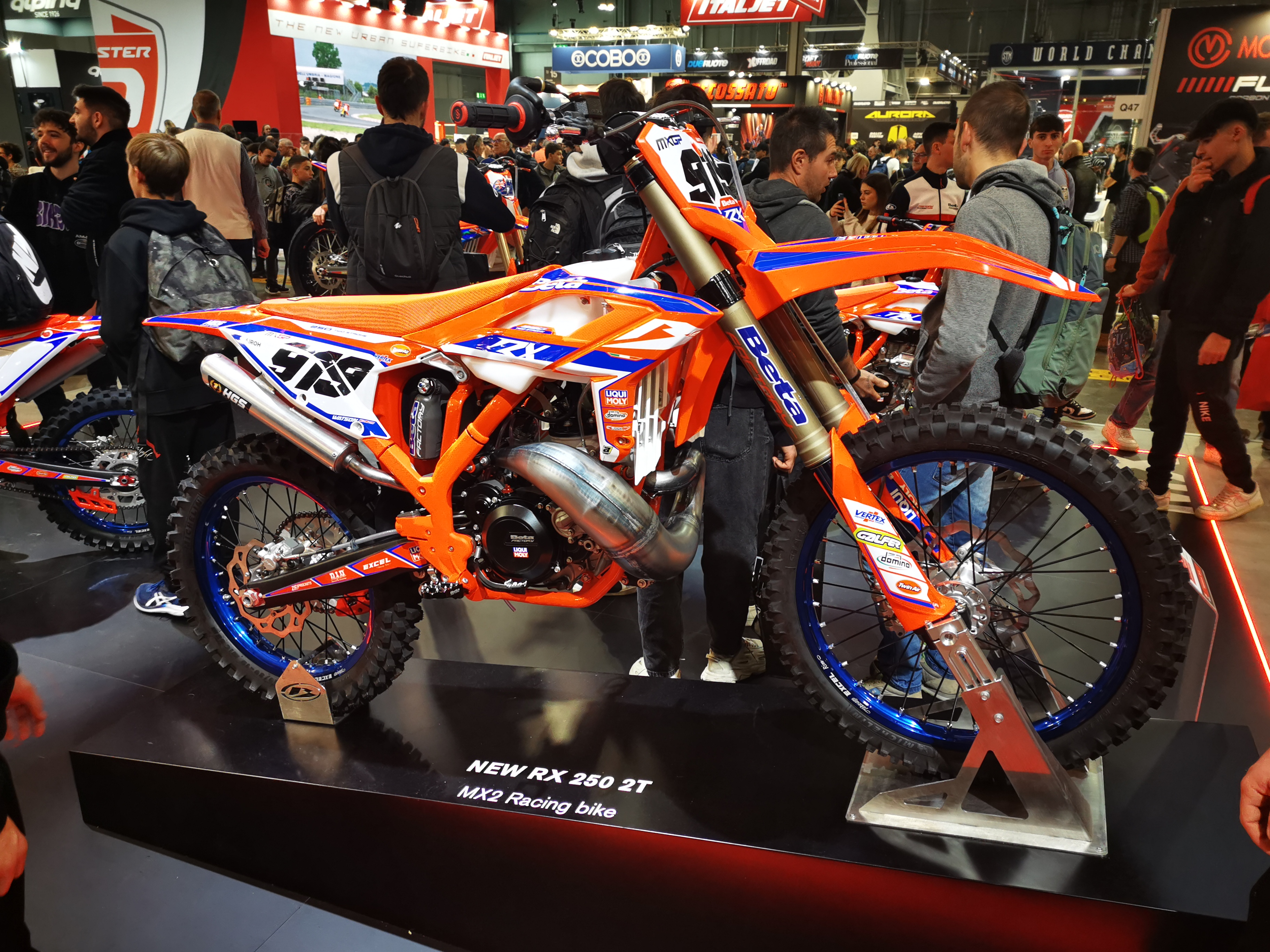
2026 Beta RX 250

The 2026 2T motocross bikes saw new models appear. A 250 RX was added and the 300 RX was replaced by the 350 RX.

- Beta RX 250 (2026–present)
- Beta RX 300 (2021–2025)
- Beta RX 350 (2026–present)
- Beta RX 450 (2021–present) (Note: 450 RX introduces new engine cases lacking the kick starter")

== Adventure models ==
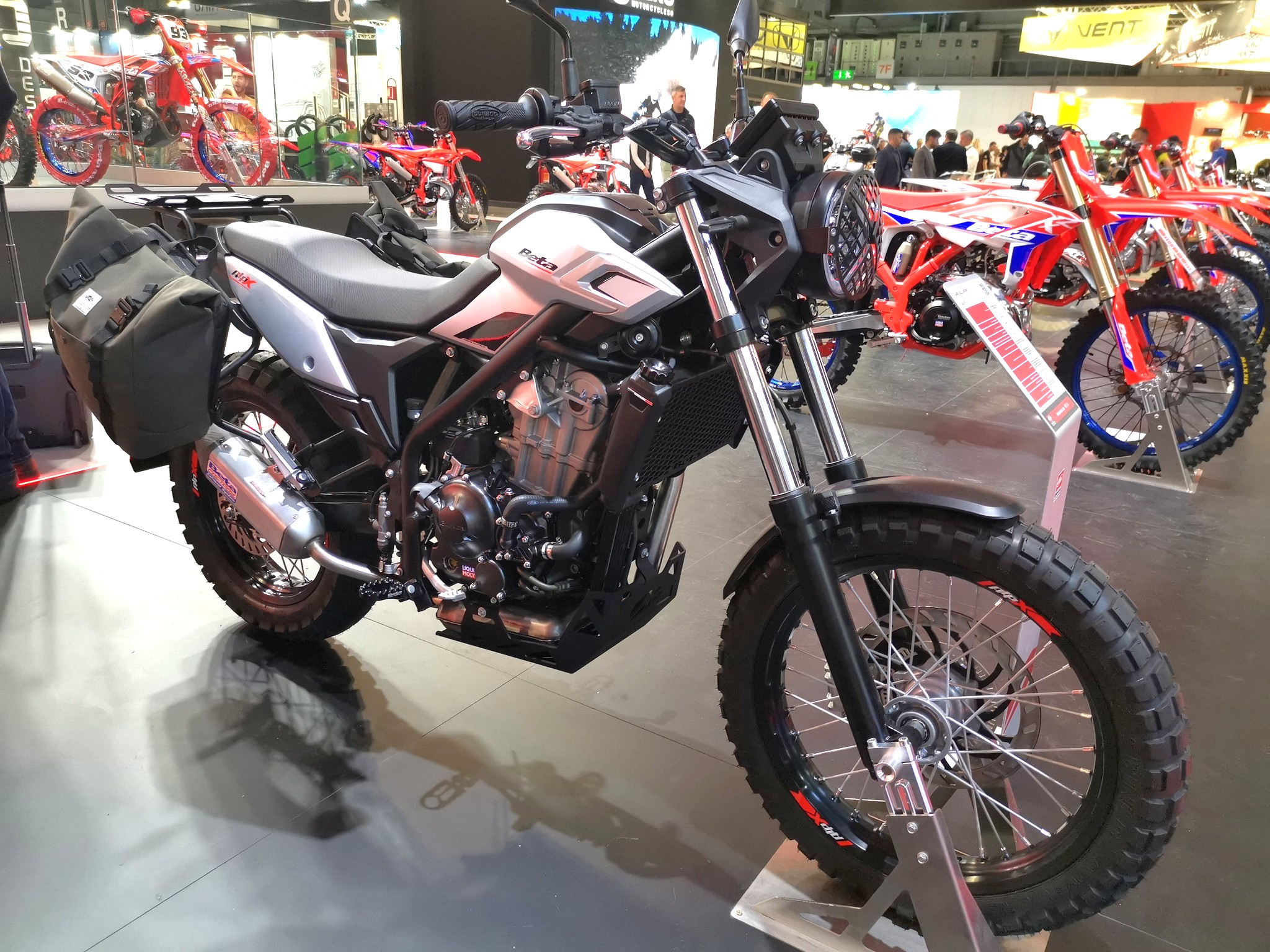
2025 Beta Alp 4.0

Early ALP hybrid models had the ability of converting from dual sports to trials bikes by removing the seat and plastic shrouds. Later Alp models used air-cooled Suzuki DR engines and have a reputation of being easy to ride due to their low seat height.

- Alp 125 (2000–2014)
- Alp 200 (1999–2023)
- Alp 4.0 350 (2003–present)

For 2026 the Alp line is re-classified as the Adventure models. Beta has equipped the new bikes with their in-house developed 350 cc, liquid cooled, fuel injected, 4T motor.

== Street models ==
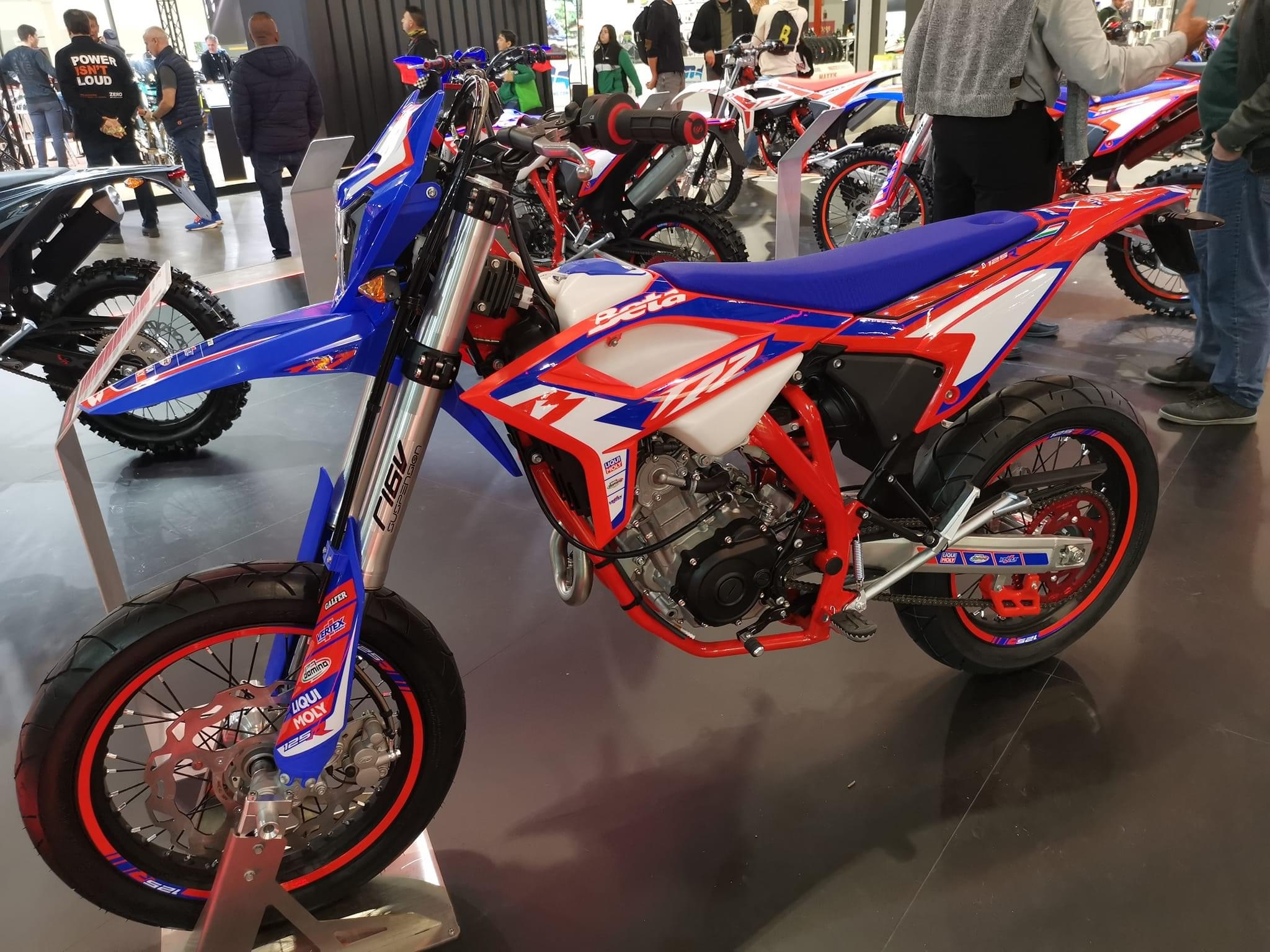
2024 Beta RR Track 125

Since 2018 Beta offers a 50-125 cc Supermoto bike called the Beta RR Track.

== See also ==
- List of scooters
- Scooter (motorcycle)
- List of scooter manufacturers
- List of Italian companies
- List of motorcycle manufacturers, Italy
