= Bradford Freeman =

Bradford or Brad Freeman may refer to:

- Bradford C. Freeman, American soldier, the last survivor of Easy Company of the 101st Airborne Division
- Bradford M. Freeman, American businessman and conservative political fundraiser
- Brad Freeman (motorcyclist), British motorcycle racer
