= 2019 FIM Enduro World Championship =

The 2019 World Enduro Championship is the 30th season of the FIM World Enduro Championship. The season consists of seven events.

Steve Holcombe goes into the championship after winning both the EnduroGP and Enduro 3 classes in 2018. Brad Freeman is the reigning Enduro 1 champion, with Eero Remes going into the season after taking the Enduro 2 title last year. A new class, the Enduro Open World Cup, will be contested for the first time in 2019. The aim of the class is to increase the number of privateer competitors.

== Calendar ==
A seven-round calendar was announced.

Round	Event	Location	Dates
1	Germany	Dahlen	22–24 March
2	Portugal	Valpaços	3–5 May
3	Spain	Santiago de Compostela	10–12 May
4	Greece	Serres	14–16 June
5	Italy	Rovetta	21–23 June
6	Czech Republic	Uhlirske Janovice	13–15 September
7	France	Ambert	27–29 September

== EnduroGP ==
=== Riders Championship ===
Pos	Rider	Bike	Class	GER (Germany)		POR (Portugal)		ESP (Spain)		GRE (Greece)		ITA (Italy)		CZE (Czech Republic)		FRA (France)		Points
1	(United Kingdom) Freeman	Beta	Enduro 1	3	2	2	1	1	1	1	1	7	10	1	1	1	4	237
2	(United Kingdom) Holcombe	Beta	Enduro 3	1	1	1	2	2	6	2	7	2	4	2	2	2	3	226
3	(United Kingdom) McCanney	TM	Enduro 3	2	3	4	4	3	2	9	4	1	5	3	3	3	6	196
4	(France) Larrieu	TM	Enduro 2	5	6	Ret	DNS	4	5	6	6	5	2	6	5	4	1	147
5	(Italy) Salvini	Honda	Enduro 2	24	5	3	3	5	4	Ret	11	9	1	7	4	5	2	146
6	(Italy) Cavallo	Sherco	Enduro 1	6	9	9	8	10	8	3	3	3	Ret	5	6	8	5	131
7	(Italy) Oldrati	Honda	Enduro 1	9	8	10	13	7	10	4	2	4	7	11	7	6	14	117
8	(France) Charlier	Honda	Enduro 2	8	13	5	5	8	9	Ret	5	6	6	8	10	14	12	99
9	(Chile) Herrera	Beta	Enduro 2	10	10	11	9	19	11	8	10	8	8	9	9	11	10	84
10	(Italy) Guarneri	Honda	Enduro 1	13	7	8	7	11	7	7	9	Ret	DNS	10	13	17	9	75
11	(Italy) Redondi	Husqvarna	Enduro 2	11	Ret	6	11	6	3	5	18	Ret	DNS	17	8	7	Ret	73
12	(France) Basset	Husqvarna	Enduro 2	12	11	13	12	12	13			10	3	12	12	10	8	66
13	(Finland) Remes	Yamaha	Enduro 2	Ret	4	7	6	13	20	10	8	21	13	16	15	16	17	53
14	(United Kingdom) Wootton	Husqvarna	Enduro 2	26	12	Ret	19	9	12	15	Ret	16	15	4	11	9	7	51
15	(Spain) Mirabet	Honda	Enduro 1	Ret	DNS	Ret	10	14	24	13	13	12	11	13	14	15	18	29
16	(France) Geslin	Beta	Enduro 3	16	14	14	15	18	16	11	11	15	14	15	17	18	16	19
17	(France) Blanjoue	KTM	Enduro 2	15	16	12	14	Ret	Ret	12	14	13	Ret			Ret	13	19
18	(France) Nambotin	Gas Gas	Enduro 3	4	Ret							Ret	DNS			19	11	18
19	(France) Abgrall	Beta	Enduro 3	14	15	15	18	16	15	14	15	14	17	14	16	12	15	17
20	(Sweden) Elowson	Husqvarna	Enduro 2	7	DNS													9
21	(Italy) Moroni	KTM	Enduro 1	17	18	18	17	17	14			17	9					9
22	(France) Meo	Honda	Enduro 2									11	Ret			13	Ret	8
23	(Italy) Soreca	Honda	Enduro 2			17	Ret	15	17	18	16	19	12					5
Pos	Rider	Bike	Class	GER (Germany)		POR (Portugal)		ESP (Spain)		GRE (Greece)		ITA (Italy)		CZE (Czech Republic)		FRA (France)		Points

=== Enduro 1 ===
Team	Constructor	No	Rider	Rounds
MC Racing Sebino	Beta	11	(Italy) Gianluca Martini	5
	Honda	11	(France) Zach Pichon	7
Beta Boano Costa Ligure	Beta	12	(United Kingdom) Brad Freeman	All
Team Specia ASD	Honda	16	(Italy) Nicola Recchia	5
DRK Racing Team	KTM	17	(Czech Republic) Lukáš Kučera	6–7
TNT Corse	KTM	19	(Italy) Tommaso Montanari	5
TNT Corse	KTM	24	(Italy) Niccolo Scarpelli	5
Honda Redmoto World Enduro Team	Honda	22	(Italy) Thomas Oldrati	All
Sherco CH Racing Team	Sherco	25	(Italy) Matteo Cavallo	All
Hostettler Yamaha	Yamaha	30	(Switzerland) Jonathan Rossé	3, 6
Gas Gas Factory Team	Gas Gas	31	(United Kingdom) Alex Snow	1
Honda Impala	Honda	38	(Spain) Kirian Mirabet	All
Honda Redmoto Lunigiana Racing Team	Honda	39	(Italy) Davide Guarneri	All
Team Sturm	KTM	51	(Germany) Andreas Beier	1, 5–6
Entrophy Motorbike	Beta	80	(Italy) Nicolo Mori	5
Team Farioli KTM	KTM	90	(Italy) Rudy Moroni	1–3, 5
Cabutti Motor	KTM	95	(Italy) Michele Musso	5
Jarsen Team Enduro Dukla Praha	KTM	96	(Czech Republic) Patrik Markvart	1–6
BvZ Racing Team	KTM	98	(Germany) Jan Allers	1, 5
	Beta	99	(Italy) Alessandro Mayr	5
TM Factory Racing Team	TM	99	(Italy) Andrea Verona	6–7

=== Riders Championship ===
Pos	Rider	Bike	GER (Germany)		POR (Portugal)		ESP (Spain)		GRE (Greece)		ITA (Italy)		CZE (Czech Republic)		FRA (France)		Points
1	(United Kingdom) Freeman	Beta	1	1	1	1	1	1	1	1	3	3	1	1	1	1	270
2	(Italy) Oldrati	Honda	3	3	4	5	2	4	3	2	2	1	4	3	2	4	211
3	(Italy) Cavallo	Sherco	2	4	3	3	3	3	2	3	1	Ret	2	2	3	2	208
4	(Italy) Guarneri	Honda	4	2	2	2	4	2	4	4	Ret	DNS	3	4	5	3	174
5	(Spain) Mirabet	Honda	Ret	DNS	Ret	4	5	8	5	5	4	4	5	5	4	5	126
6	(Czech Republic) Markvart	KTM	7	6	6	7	8	6	6	6	11	7	6	6			110
7	(Italy) Moroni	KTM	5	5	5	6	6	5			5	2					92
8	(Czech Republic) Kučera	KTM											9	7	6	7	35
9	(Germany) Beier	KTM	6	7							Ret	DNS	7	Ret			28
10	(Switzerland) Rossé	Yamaha					7	7					8	DNS			26
11	(Italy) Martini	Beta									6	5					21
12	(Italy) Recchia	Honda									10	8					14
13	(France) Pichon	Honda													Ret	6	10
14	(Italy) Montanari	KTM									Ret	6					10
15	(Italy) Scarpelli	KTM									7	Ret					9
16	(Italy) Mori	Beta									8	Ret					8
17	(Germany) Allers	KTM	8	Ret							Ret	Ret					8
18	(Italy) Musso	KTM									9	Ret					7
19	(Italy) Mayr	Beta									12	Ret					4
	(United Kingdom) Snow	Gas Gas	Ret	DNS													0
Pos	Rider	Bike	GER (Germany)		POR (Portugal)		ESP (Spain)		GRE (Greece)		ITA (Italy)		CZE (Czech Republic)		FRA (France)		Points

=== Enduro 2 ===
Team	Constructor	No	Rider	Rounds
TM Factory Racing Team	TM	4	(France) Loic Larrieu	All
Elowson Racing KB	Husqvarna	6	(Sweden) Albin Elowson	1
Honda Redmoto World Enduro Team	Honda	8	(France) Antoine Meo	5, 7
Honda Redmoto World Enduro Team	Honda	23	(France) Christophe Charlier	All
S2 Motorsports Sembenini Honda Redmoto	Honda	9	(Italy) Alex Salvini	All
Honda Redmoto Lunigiana Racing Team	Honda	10	(Italy) Davide Soreca	2–5
Honda Redmoto Lunigiana Racing Team	Honda	52	(Portugal) Diogo Ventura	1–2, 6–7
Solarys Racing	Husqvarna	15	(Italy) Jacopo Cerutti	5
Solarys Racing	Husqvarna	42	(Italy) Maurizio Gerini	5
Atomic Moto	Husqvarna	18	(France) Antoine Basset	1–3, 5–7
Tech36 Honda	Honda	26	(Italy) Nicolo Bruschi	7
Team TO Enduro	Beta	29	(France) Vincent Gautie	7
Jetmar KTM	KTM	31	(Portugal) Luis Oliveira	2–3
JET Zanardo	KTM	32	(United Kingdom) Joe Wootton	All
JET Zanardo	Husqvarna	81	(Italy) Giacomo Redondi	All
Team Yamaha Johansson MPE	Yamaha	34	(Finland) Eero Remes	All
Yamaha Ridercamp Enduro Team	Yamaha	44	(France) Jeremy Carpentier	7
Daytona Motorsport	TM	46	(Finland) Eemil Pohjola	5, 7
Team Sturm	KTM	48	(Germany) Edward Hübner	All
Team KTM France	KTM	56	(France) Hugo Blanjoue	1–5, 7
Team Beta Oxmoto	Beta	61	(France) Alex Pichaud	7
KTM GST Berlin	KTM	71	(Germany) Christian Brockel	1, 5
Team Beta Factory Racing	Beta	78	(Chile) Benjamin Herrera	All
BvZ Racing Team	KTM	98	(Germany) Jan Allers	7

=== Riders Championship ===
Pos	Rider	Bike	GER (Germany)		POR (Portugal)		ESP (Spain)		GRE (Greece)		ITA (Italy)		CZE (Czech Republic)		FRA (France)		Points
1	(France) Larrieu	TM	1	3	Ret	DNS	1	3	2	2	1	2	2	2	1	1	215
1	(Italy) Salvini	Honda	9	2	1	1	2	2	Ret	5	4	1	3	1	2	2	211
3	(France) Charlier	Honda	3	7	2	2	4	4	Ret	1	2	4	4	5	8	6	176
4	(Chile) Herrera	Beta	4	4	5	4	9	5	3	4	3	5	5	4	6	5	167
5	(Italy) Redondi	Husqvarna	5	Ret	3	5	3	1	1	8	Ret	DNS	8	3	3	Ret	138
6	(Finland) Remes	Yamaha	Ret	1	4	3	7	11	4	3	11	7	7	8	9	8	136
7	(France) Basset	Husqvarna	6	5	7	6	6	7			5	3	6	7	5	4	128
8	(United Kingdom) Wootton	Husqvarna	11	6	Ret	9	5	6	6	Ret	8	8	1	6	4	3	127
9	(France) Blanjoue	KTM	7	8	6	7	Ret	Ret	5	6	7	Ret			Ret	7	75
10	(Germany) Hübner	KTM	8	9	10	10	10	10	7	Ret	Ret	DNS	9	9	12	11	71
11	(Italy) Soreca	Honda			9	Ret	8	8	8	7	10	6					56
12	(Portugal) Ventura	Honda	Ret	11	8	8							10	10	10	10	45
13	(Finland) Pohjola	TM									9	9			11	9	26
14	(France) Meo	Honda									6	Ret			7	Ret	19
15	(Sweden) Elowson	Husqvarna	2	DNS													17
16	(Germany) Brockel	KTM	10	10							Ret	12					16
17	(Portugal) Oliveira	KTM			Ret	Ret	11	9									12
18	(Italy) Cerutti	Husqvarna									12	10					10
19	(Italy) Gerini	Husqvarna									13	11					8
20	(France) Gautie	Beta													Ret	12	4
21	(Italy) Bruschi	Honda													14	14	4
22	(Germany) Allers	KTM													Ret	13	3
23	(France) Pichaud	Beta													13	Ret	3
	(France) Carpentier	Yamaha													Ret	DNS	0
Pos	Rider	Bike	GER (Germany)		POR (Portugal)		ESP (Spain)		GRE (Greece)		ITA (Italy)		CZE (Czech Republic)		FRA (France)		Points

=== Enduro 3 ===
Team	Constructor	No	Rider	Rounds
Team Beta Factory Racing	Beta	1	(United Kingdom) Steve Holcombe	All
Gas Gas Factory Team	Gas Gas	7	(France) Christophe Nambotin	1, 5, 7
Gas Gas Factory Team	Gas Gas	31	(United Kingdom) Alex Snow	5
Entrophy Motorbike	Beta	13	(Italy) Manuel Monni	1, 5
	TM	20	(France) Valerian Debaud	7
Honda Redriders	Honda	31	(Greece) Vasilios Siafarikas	4
TM UK	TM	40	(United Kingdom) Josh Gotts	6–7
TM Factory Racing Team	TM	43	(United Kingdom) Daniel McCanney	All
Beta Boano Costa Ligure	Beta	44	(Italy) Deny Philippaerts	5
Team KTM GST Berlin	KTM	55	(Germany) Angus Heidecke	1
Husqvarna Enduro Wills Team	Husqvarna	57	(Germany) Dennis Schröter	1
E/50 Racing	Gas Gas	60	(Italy) Luca Marcotulli	5
E/50 Racing	Gas Gas	83	(Italy) Alessandro Battig	5
E/50 Racing	Gas Gas	85	(Italy) Simone Trapletti	1, 3
Team Beta Motor France	Beta	64	(France) Anthony Geslin	All
Bauer Gruppe KTM Hannover	KTM	69	(Germany) Tim Apolle	1
Team Beta Oxmoto	Beta	91	(France) David Abgrall	All
Jarsen Team Enduro Dukla Praha	KTM	94	(Czech Republic) Jiri Hadek	1, 6–7

=== Riders Championship ===
Pos	Rider	Bike	GER (Germany)		POR (Portugal)		ESP (Spain)		GRE (Greece)		ITA (Italy)		CZE (Czech Republic)		FRA (France)		Points
1	(United Kingdom) Holcombe	Beta	1	1	1	1	1	2	1	2	2	1	1	1	1	1	271
2	(United Kingdom) McCanney	TM	2	2	2	2	2	1	2	1	1	2	2	2	2	2	247
3	(France) Abgrall	Beta	4	4	4	4	3	3	4	4	3	4	3	3	3	4	194
4	(France) Geslin	Beta	5	3	3	3	4	4	3	3	4	3	4	4	4	5	190
5	(Czech Republic) Hadek	KTM	10	9									5	5	7	7	53
6	(France) Nambotin	Gas Gas	3	Ret							Ret	DNS			5	3	41
7	(United Kingdom) Gotts	TM											6	6	6	6	40
8	(Italy) Trapletti	Gas Gas	11	10			5	5									33
9	(Italy) Monni	Beta	8	7							Ret	5					28
10	(Italy) Philippaerts	Beta									5	6					21
11	(Germany) Schrōter	Husqvarna	6	5													21
12	(United Kingdom) Snow	Gas Gas									6	7					19
13	(Germany) Heidecke	KTM	7	6													19
14	(Italy) Marcotulli	Gas Gas									7	9					16
15	(Germany) Apolle	KTM	9	8													15
16	(Greece) Siafarikas	Honda							5	Ret							11
17	(Italy) Battig	Gas Gas									Ret	8					8
	(France) Debaud	TM													Ret	Ret	0
Pos	Rider	Bike	GER (Germany)		POR (Portugal)		ESP (Spain)		GRE (Greece)		ITA (Italy)		CZE (Czech Republic)		FRA (France)		Points

== Junior ==
=== Riders Championship ===
Pos	Rider	Bike	Class	GER (Germany)		POR (Portugal)		ESP (Spain)		GRE (Greece)		ITA (Italy)		CZE (Czech Republic)		FRA (France)		Points
1	(Italy) Verona	TM	Junior 1	1	1	1	1	1	1	1	3	1	1					195
2	(France) Espinasse	Sherco	Junior 1	2	3	7	4	4	2	5	5	2	2	3	1	2	1	168
3	(Spain) Francisco	KTM	Junior 2	6	4	3	2	2	4	2	2	12	3	5	3	12	Ret	150
4	(United Kingdom) Edmondson	Sherco	Junior 2	4	5	4	3	3	3	7	7	3	5	Ret	DNS			126
5	(Belgium) Magain	KTM	Junior 1			9	7	7	8	6	4	6	6	2	2	4	3	123
6	(Chile) Barbosa	Husqvarna	Junior 2	13	10	5	9	9	7	4	Ret	4	4	6	4	3	2	121
7	(Finland) Kytönen	Husqvarna	Junior 1			8	6	6	5	3	1	5	7	4	7			116
8	(Australia) Ruprecht	Yamaha	Junior 1	3	2	2	13	5	17					1	11	1	Ret	108
9	(France) Le Quere	Sherco	Junior 2	8	14	12	12	12	9	8	11	11	8	7	5	8	5	80
10	(Italy) Facchetti	Gas Gas	Junior 2	9	7	13	14	10	6	12	10	7	9	Ret	12	6	10	74
11	(Spain) Sans	KTM	Junior 1	12	9	10	8	15	10	11	8	10	14	11	10	9	7	68
12	(France) De Clercq	Husqvarna	Junior 2	10	Ret	16	11	8	Ret	9	9	16	12			5	6	58
13	(France) Dubost	KTM	Junior 1	7	8	11	5	13	11									41
14	(Czech Republic) Kouble	KTM	Junior 2			6	10	11	12	10	6	Ret	DNS					41
15	(Belgium) Van Oevelen	Gas Gas	Junior 1	5	6	14	16	14	Ret							Ret	8	33
16	(France) Criq	Honda	Junior 1	20	20	20	22	21	18			17	13	8	8	10	11	30
17	(Spain) Tomas	Beta	Junior 2							13	13	13	11	10	9	15	Ret	28
18	(United Kingdom) Walton	Yamaha	Junior 1	21	23	17	19	17	15	14	12	18	22	9	6	17	16	24
19	(United Kingdom) Etchells	Sherco	Junior 2													7	4	22
20	(France) Theric	Beta	Junior 2	18	16	15	15	16	14					13	13	16	12	14
21	(Italy) Spandre	KTM	Junior 2									9	10					13
22	(San Marino) Marini	Beta	Junior 2	24	19	18	20	19	13	15	14	21	16	12	15	18	14	13
23	(France) Passet	Sherco	Junior 2	32	15	Ret	17	Ret	DNS			8	Ret			Ret	DNS	9
24	(Italy) Macoritto	Beta	Junior 2	11	12													9
25	(France) Mazieres	Husqvarna	Junior 2													11	13	8
26	(France) Devoulx	Husqvarna	Junior 1													Ret	9	7
27	(France) Vial	Beta	Junior 2	17	13			18	16			15	21	Ret	DNS	14	15	7
28	(Sweden) Wicksell	KTM	Junior 2	15	11													6
29	(France) Raquidel	KTM	Junior 2													13	Ret	3
30	(Czech Republic) Živný	Husqvarna	Junior 1	27	24									19	14			2
31	(Estonia) Biene	Yamaha	Junior 2	29	Ret	22	21	22	19	Ret	DNS			14	19	21	20	2
32	(France) Fargier	Sherco	Junior 2	22	25			20	Ret			14	Ret			Ret	Ret	2
33	(France) Debaud	Sherco	Junior 1	14	Ret													2
34	(Czech Republic) Hroneš	Gas Gas	Junior 2											15	Ret			1
35	(Italy) Zilli	Husqvarna	Junior 2	25	26							20	15					1
36	(Italy) Martinelli	Gas Gas	Junior 1							16	15	Ret	Ret					1
Pos	Rider	Bike	Class	GER (Germany)		POR (Portugal)		ESP (Spain)		GRE (Greece)		ITA (Italy)		CZE (Czech Republic)		FRA (France)		Points

=== Junior 1 ===
Team	Constructor	No	Rider	Rounds
Team Honda ORC	Honda	2	(France) Alexis Beaud	5
Team Honda ORC	Honda	6	(France) Antoine Criq	1–3, 5–7
Slovnaft Rally Team	KTM	2	(Slovakia) Martin Giertl	6
RFME Junior Team	Husqvarna	4	(Spain) Marc Sans	All
RFME Junior Team	Husqvarna	27	(Spain) Sergio Navarro	4
Sherco CH Racing Team	Sherco	7	(France) Theophile Espinasse	All
Sherco CH Racing Team	Sherco	11	(United Kingdom) Daniel Mundell	6–7
Team Yamaha Johansson MPE	Yamaha	9	(United Kingdom) Alex Walton	All
Team Yamaha Johansson MPE	Yamaha	17	(Australia) Wil Ruprecht	1–3, 6–7
Team KTM France	KTM	14	(France) Thomas Dubost	1–3
Husqvarna Scandinavia	Husqvarna	19	(Sweden) John Salomonsson	1
Team Sherco Academy France	Sherco	20	(France) Valerian Debaud	1
	KTM	27	(Sweden) Marcus Göthenberg	1
BieTi KTM Roma	KTM	28	(Italy) Silvestro Silvi	5, 7
SE Team Yamaha Enduro	Yamaha	30	(Finland) Eemil Helander	2–3
E/50 Racing	Gas Gas	36	(Italy) Maurizio Martinelli	4–5
MEFO Sport Racing Team	KTM	44	(Germany) Felix Hail	5
Entrophy Motorbike	Beta	51	(Italy) Jacopo Traini	1, 5, 7
KBS UAMK Team	Husqvarna	54	(Czech Republic) Adolf Živný	1, 6
Team Sturm Zschopau	KTM	64	(Germany) Kevin Nieschalk	6
KTM Team Musch	KTM	66	(Germany) Yanik Spachmüller	1, 5–7
Beta Boano Costa Ligure	Beta	70	(Italy) Giuliano Mancuso	5
Beta Boano Costa Ligure	Beta	98	(Italy) Matteo Pavoni	4
Team MM Racing	KTM	71	(Belgium) Antoine Magain	2–7
Kytönen Motorsport	Husqvarna	91	(Finland) Roni Kytönen	2–6
Motoracing97	Husqvarna	97	(France) Isaac Devoulx	7
Gas Gas Factory Junior Team	Gas Gas	98	(Belgium) Matthew Van Oevelen	1–3
TM Factory Racing Team	TM	99	(Italy) Andrea Verona	1–5

=== Riders Championship ===
Pos	Rider	Bike	GER (Germany)		POR (Portugal)		ESP (Spain)		GRE (Greece)		ITA (Italy)		CZE (Czech Republic)		FRA (France)		Points
1	(Italy) Verona	TM	1	1	1	1	1	1	1	2	1	1					197
2	(France) Espinasse	Sherco	2	3	3	2	2	2	3	4	2	2	3	1	2	1	174
3	(Belgium) Magain	KTM			5	5	5	4	4	3	4	3	2	2	3	2	146
4	(Finland) Kytönen	Husqvarna			4	4	4	3	2	1	3	4	4	4			145
5	(Australia) Ruprecht	Yamaha	3	2	2	7	3	8					1	7	1	Ret	130
6	(Spain) Sans	KTM	6	6	6	6	8	5	5	5	5	6	7	6	4	3	112
7	(United Kingdom) Walton	Yamaha	10	10	9	10	9	7	6	6	7	9	6	3	6	6	97
8	(France) Criq	Honda	9	8	11	11	10	9			6	5	5	5	5	5	93
9	(France) Dubost	KTM	5	5	7	3	6	6									66
10	(Belgium) Van Oevelen	Gas Gas	4	4	8	8	7	Ret									51
11	(Germany) Spachmüller	KTM	12	9							9	8	11	10	Ret	7	46
12	(Czech Republic) Živný	Husqvarna	11	11									9	8			25
13	(Italy) Traini	Beta	14	Ret							Ret	7			Ret	8	19
14	(Italy) Martinelli	Gas Gas							7	7	Ret	Ret					18
15	(Sweden) Salomonsson	Husqvarna	8	7													17
16	(Slovakia) Giertl	KTM											8	9			15
17	(France) Devoulx	Husqvarna													Ret	4	13
18	(Finland) Helander	Yamaha			10	9	Ret	DNS									13
19	(Germany) Nieschalk	KTM											10	11			11
20	(France) Debaud	Sherco	7	Ret													9
21	(Italy) Mancuso	Beta									8	Ret					8
22	(Italy) Silvi	KTM									Ret	Ret			Ret	9	7
23	(Sweden) Göthenberg	KTM	13	12													7
	(Spain) Navarro	Husqvarna							Ret	Ret							0
	(France) Beaud	Honda									Ret	Ret					0
	(Germany) Hail	KTM									Ret	Ret					0
Pos	Rider	Bike	GER (Germany)		POR (Portugal)		ESP (Spain)		GRE (Greece)		ITA (Italy)		CZE (Czech Republic)		FRA (France)		Points

=== Junior 2 ===
Team	Constructor	No	Rider	Rounds
Husqvarna Belgium	Husqvarna	5	(Belgium) Matthew Van Oevelen	7
RFME Junior Team	Beta	6	(Spain) Pau Tomas	4–7
RFME Junior Team	KTM	12	(Spain) Enric Francisco	All
Husqvarna Scandinavia	Husqvarna	10	(Sweden) Oskar Ljungström	1
JET Zanardo	Husqvarna	14	(Chile) Ruy Barbosa	All
Osellini Moto	Husqvarna	16	(Italy) Enrico Zilli	1, 5
Sherco CH Racing Team	Sherco	18	(United Kingdom) Jack Edmondson	1–6
Jarsen Team Enduro Dukla Praha	KTM	23	(Czech Republic) Kryštof Kouble	2–5
Team Sherco Academy France	Sherco	28	(France) Thibaut Passet	1–3, 5, 7
Team Sherco Academy France	Sherco	49	(France) Luc Fargier	1, 3, 5, 7
Team Sherco Academy France	Sherco	98	(France) Léo Le Quere	All
Team Sissi Racing	KTM	29	(Italy) Federico Aresi	5
Team Sissi Racing	KTM	72	(Italy) Mirko Spandre	5
Beta Boano Costa Ligure	Beta	30	(San Marino) Thomas Marini	All
Beta Boano Costa Ligure	Beta	95	(Italy) Lorenzo Macoritto	1
E/50 Racing	Gas Gas	32	(Italy) Emanuele Facchetti	All
KBS UAMK Team	Gas Gas	38	(Czech Republic) Jakub Hroneš	6
LM Racing	Husqvarna	46	(France) Till De Clercq	1–5, 7
Atomic Moto	Husqvarna	47	(France) Nicolas Mazieres	7
Atomic Moto	Beta	96	(France) Max Vial	1, 3, 5–7
MRS Racing	Sherco	48	(United Kingdom) Jed Etchells	7
KTM Katowice Eurorider	KTM	50	(Poland) Dominik Olszowy	1
Team Yamaha Johansson MPE	Yamaha	51	(Estonia) Priit Biene	1–4, 6–7
Rigo Racing	KTM	52	(Italy) Ramon Bregoli	5
Team Honda ORC	Honda	55	(France) Alexis Beaud	1–2
JBS Moto KTM	KTM	58	(France) Julien Raquidel	7
Team Beta Motor France	Beta	66	(France) Neels Theric	1–3, 6–7
Team Sturm	KTM	67	(Germany) Florian Görner	1, 6
TTR Officine Rigamonti Team	Husqvarna	71	(Italy) Enrico Rinaldi	5, 7
OSK Racing Team	Husqvarna	78	(Norway) Christian Illidi	1
	KTM	84	(France) Marceau Paillasson	7
	KTM	88	(Sweden) Jimmy Wicksell	1
Ride and Race Husqvarna	Husqvarna	89	(Belgium) Erik Willems	7
Beta Junior FR Motorsport	Beta	96	(Italy) Mirko Giudici	5

=== Riders Championship ===
Pos	Rider	Bike	GER (Germany)		POR (Portugal)		ESP (Spain)		GRE (Greece)		ITA (Italy)		CZE (Czech Republic)		FRA (France)		Points
1	(Spain) Francisco	KTM	2	1	1	1	1	2	1	1	7	1	1	1	7	Ret	197
2	(United Kingdom) Edmondson	Sherco	1	2	2	2	2	1	3	3	1	3	Ret	DNS			173
3	(Chile) Barbosa	Husqvarna	7	4	3	3	4	4	2	Ret	2	2	2	2	1	1	168
4	(France) Le Quere	Sherco	3	8	5	6	7	5	4	6	6	4	3	3	5	3	129
5	(Italy) Facchetti	Gas Gas	4	3	6	7	5	3	7	5	3	5	Ret	5	3	6	127
6	(France) De Clercq	Husqvarna	5	Ret	8	5	3	Ret	5	4	11	8			2	4	112
7	(France) Theric	Beta	11	10	7	8	8	8					6	6	11	7	78
8	(San Marino) Marini	Beta	14	12	9	10	10	7	9	8	13	10	5	7	12	9	76
9	(Czech Republic) Kouble	KTM			4	4	6	6	6	2	Ret	DNS					73
10	(Spain) Tomas	Beta							8	7	8	7	4	4	10	Ret	66
11	(France) Vial	Beta	10	7			9	9			10	13	Ret	DNS	9	10	51
12	(Estonia) Biene	Yamaha	17	Ret	11	11	12	10	Ret	DNS			7	9	15	12	41
13	(United Kingdom) Etchells	Sherco													4	2	30
14	(France) Passet	Sherco	18	9	Ret	9	Ret	DNS			4	Ret			Ret	DNS	27
15	(Italy) Spandre	KTM									5	6					21
16	(Italy) Macoritto	Beta	6	6													20
17	(Sweden) Wicksell	KTM	8	5													19
18	(France) Mazieres	Husqvarna													6	8	18
19	(France) Fargier	Sherco	12	14			11	Ret			9	Ret			Ret	Ret	18
20	(Germany) Görner	KTM	16	Ret									9	8			15
21	(Italy) Zilli	Husqvarna	15	15							12	9					13
22	(Italy) Rinaldi	Husqvarna									Ret	11			13	11	13
23	(Sweden) Ljungström	Husqvarna	9	11													12
24	(Belgium) Van Oevelen	Husqvarna													Ret	5	11
25	(France) Beaud	Honda	13	Ret	10	Ret											9
26	(France) Raquidel	KTM													8	Ret	8
27	(Czech Republic) Hroneš	Gas Gas											8	Ret			8
28	(Italy) Aresi	KTM									15	12					5
29	(Norway) Illidi	Husqvarna	Ret	13													3
30	(France) Paillasson	KTM													14	Ret	2
31	(Italy) Giudici	Beta									14	Ret					2
	(Italy) Bregoli	KTM									16	Ret					0
	(Belgium) Willems	Husqvarna													16	Ret	0
	(Poland) Olszowy	KTM	Ret	DNS													0
Pos	Rider	Bike	GER (Germany)		POR (Portugal)		ESP (Spain)		GRE (Greece)		ITA (Italy)		CZE (Czech Republic)		FRA (France)		Points

== Youth ==
Team	Constructor	No	Rider	Rounds
Team Motokrosovaskola.cz	Beta	3	(Czech Republic) Robert Friedrich	1, 5
Dafy Enduro Team	Husqvarna	4	(France) Nathan Bererd	All
Dafy Enduro Team	Husqvarna	26	(France) Pierrick Mermier	1–3, 6
Dafy Enduro Team	Husqvarna	64	(France) Killian Irigoyen	1–4, 6
Team Sherco Academy France	Sherco	5	(France) Thibault Giraudon	6
Team Sherco Academy France	Sherco	34	(France) Robin Filhol	1, 3–4
Team Sherco Academy France	Sherco	96	(France) Antoine Alix	2–3, 5–6
	KTM	7	(Italy) Simone Cristini	4
Team Racespec	KTM	9	(Portugal) Tomas Clemente	All
	Beta	10	(Austria) Nikon Muigg	1
Sherco CH Racing Team	Sherco	11	(United Kingdom) Daniel Mundell	2–4
Sherco CH Racing Team	Sherco	76	(New Zealand) Hamish MacDonald	All
Sherco Academy Deutschland	Sherco	16	(Germany) Karl Weigelt	2–6
Sherco Academy Deutschland	Sherco	62	(Germany) Luca Fischeder	All
Team Moto Axxe Elite	KTM	16	(France) Yann Dupic	6
RFME Junior Team	Husqvarna	17	(Spain) Alejandro Navarro	1–3
RFME Junior Team	Husqvarna	27	(Spain) Sergio Navarro	2–6
RFME Junior Team	Husqvarna	92	(Spain) Adria Sanchez	1–3, 6
Osellini Moto	Husqvarna	19	(Italy) Lorenzo Bernini	4, 6
Osellini Moto	Husqvarna	66	(Italy) Claudio Spanu	All
Team Yamaha Johansson MPE	Yamaha	21	(Sweden) Marcus Adielsson	1–5
Team Yamaha Johansson MPE	Yamaha	28	(Finland) Hugo Svärd	All
E.T. James	KTM	25	(United Kingdom) Henry Yardley	1, 3, 6
Oliveira Racing Team	Yamaha	34	(Portugal) Rodrigo Luz	2–3
JET Zanardo	Husqvarna	35	(Canada) Jamie Baskerville	6
JET Zanardo	Husqvarna	48	(Chile) Enzo Pellegrini	2–4
Team Farioli KTM	KTM	38	(Italy) Manolo Morettini	All
Beta UK	Beta	42	(United Kingdom) Harry Edmondson	1, 6
KTM Novi Korona	KTM	50	(Poland) Aleksander Bracik	1
	Yamaha	51	(France) Arnaud Tortosa	6
Team TM XCentric	TM	54	(France) Florian Furtado	6
D'Arpa Racing	Husqvarna	69	(Italy) Matteo Grigis	4
D'Arpa Racing	Yamaha	74	(Italy) Thomas Grigis	4
Strombergs Racing	KTM	77	(Sweden) Max Ahlin	1, 6
	KTM	81	(Netherlands) Mike Bokslag	1
	Beta	83	(Chile) Camilo Herrera	5–6
	Beta	84	(Italy) Luca Pavone	4, 6
ADS MXN Team	KTM	91	(Netherlands) Marc Zomer	1
TNT Corse	KTM	94	(Italy) Riccardo Fabris	4, 6
Beta Boano Costa Ligure	Beta	98	(Italy) Matteo Pavoni	All
JRB Offroad Center	Sherco	99	(Spain) Gerard Gomez	1

=== Riders Championship ===
Pos	Rider	Bike	GER (Germany)		POR (Portugal)		ESP (Spain)		ITA (Italy)		CZE (Czech Republic)		FRA (France)		Points
1	(New Zealand) MacDonald	Sherco	1	1	1	1	Ret	DNS	2	Ret	1	1	3	3	152
2	(Italy) Pavoni	Beta	3	2	3	4	Ret	1	1	2	2	4	4	5	134
3	(Italy) Spanu	Husqvarna	2	3	2	3	2	2	3	1	4	3	5	4	133
4	(France) Bererd	Husqvarna	8	5	Ret	DNS	1	3	4	Ret	3	Ret	1	2	119
5	(Spain) S. Navarro	Husqvarna			7	8	3	4	12	7	5	2	2	1	111
6	(Finland) Svärd	Yamaha	5	4	6	7	4	5	5	5	6	5	7	10	91
7	(Italy) Morettini	KTM	9	9	9	6	6	6	6	3	8	6	Ret	6	83
8	(Sweden) Adielsson	Yamaha	11	Ret	8	9	9	9	7	6	9	Ret			60
9	(Germany) Fischeder	Sherco	12	10	12	12	7	8	Ret	Ret	7	7	Ret	7	58
10	(United Kingdom) Mundell	Sherco			5	5	5	7	Ret	4					55
11	(Spain) A. Navarro	Husqvarna	4	6	4	2	Ret	DNS							53
12	(Portugal) Clemente	KTM	15	Ret	11	10	8	10	10	10	10	11	13	12	48
13	(Sweden) Åhlin	KTM	10	7									6	8	33
14	(France) Alix	Sherco			15	14	13	14			Ret	9	8	9	30
15	(France) Irigoyen	Husqvarna	Ret	DNS	13	Ret	11	12	9	9			17	Ret	26
16	(Spain) Sanchez	KTM	14	12	10	11	10	Ret					16	16	23
17	(Chile) Herrera	Beta									11	10	11	11	21
18	(France) Mermier	Husqvarna	17	14	14	13	Ret	13					10	13	19
19	(France) Filhol	Sherco	7	8			Ret	DNS	Ret	DNS					17
20	(United Kingdom) Yardley	KTM	13	11			Ret	11					12	Ret	17
21	(Italy) Cristini	KTM							8	8					16
22	(Czech Republic) Friedrich	KTM	16	13							12	8			15
23	(Italy) Fabris	KTM							11	11			15	18	11
24	(Spain) Gomez	Sherco	6	17											10
25	(United Kingdom) Edmondson	Beta	Ret	15									9	14	10
26	(Chile) Pellegrini	Husqvarna			17	16	12	Ret	Ret	12					8
27	(Germany) Weigelt	Sherco			16	15	14	15	15	Ret	13	Ret	19	20	8
28	(Italy) Pavone	Beta							14	13			21	21	5
29	(Italy) T. Grigis	Yamaha							13	Ret					3
30	(France) Dupic	KTM											14	15	3
31	(Portugal) Luz	Yamaha			Ret	Ret	15	16							1
	(Netherlands) Bokslag	KTM	Ret	16											0
	(Italy) Bernini	Husqvarna							Ret	Ret			20	17	0
	(France) Giraudon	Sherco											18	19	0
	(Netherlands) Zomer	KTM	18	Ret											0
	(France) Tortosa	Yamaha											22	Ret	0
	(France) Furtado	TM											Ret	22	0
	(Canada) Baskerville	Husqvarna											Ret	23	0
	(Italy) M. Grigis	Husqvarna							Ret	Ret					0
	(Austria) Muigg	Beta	Ret	DNS											0
	(Poland) Bracik	KTM	Ret	DNS											0
Pos	Rider	Bike	GER (Germany)		POR (Portugal)		ESP (Spain)		ITA (Italy)		CZE (Czech Republic)		FRA (France)		Points

== Women ==
=== Calendar ===
Round	Event	Location	Dates
1	France	Ambert	27-29 September

=== Entry list ===
Team	Constructor	No	Rider
Off-Road Tryout	Gas Gas	4	(United Kingdom) Nieve Holmes
Sherco Academy France	Sherco	5	(France) Elodie Chaplot
Starter Motos 71	KTM	7	(France) Juliette Berrez
Team Moto Axxe Elite	KTM	10	(France) Justine Martel
LM Racing	Husqvarna	11	(France) Audrey Rossat
Moindrot Sport Loisir	Beta	14	(France) Justine Geisler
Oxmoto	Beta	15	(France) Elsa Galand
Hawk Racing	Husqvarna	16	(United Kingdom) Rosie Rowett
	Sherco	17	(France) Mauricette Brisebard
Jetmar Husqvarna	Husqvarna	22	(Portugal) Joana Gonçalves
RFME Women Team	Sherco	26	(Spain) Kate Vall
RFME Women Team	Beta	32	(Spain) Mireia Badia
RFME Women Team	Husqvarna	33	(Spain) Aida Castro
Beta Boano Costa Ligure	Beta	27	(Argentina) Maribel Giordani
Entrophy Motorbike	Beta	36	(Italy) Raffaella Cabini
	Honda	68	(United States) Tarah Gieger
Yamaha Motor Australia	Yamaha	77	(Australia) Jessica Gardiner
KTM Nordic Racing	KTM	83	(Finland) Sanna Kärkkäinen
Freestyle Husqvarna	Husqvarna	96	(United Kingdom) Jane Daniels

=== Riders Championship ===
Pos	Rider	Bike	FRA (France)		Points
1	(United Kingdom) Daniels	Husqvarna	1	1	40
2	(Finland) Kärkäinen	KTM	2	2	34
3	(Spain) Badia	Beta	3	3	30
4	(France) Martel	KTM	4	5	24
5	(Portugal) Gonçalves	Husqvarna	5	6	21
6	(Australia) Gardiner	Yamaha	11	4	18
7	(France) Chaplot	Sherco	8	8	16
8	(United States) Gieger	Honda	9	9	14
9	(United Kingdom) Rowett	Husqvarna	10	10	12
10	(France) Rossat	Husqvarna	14	7	11
11	(France) Berrez	KTM	6	Ret	10
12	(United Kingdom) Holmes	Sherco	7	Ret	9
13	(France) Geisler	Beta	12	12	8
14	(France) Brisebard	Sherco	15	11	6
15	(France) Galand	Beta	13	14	5
16	(Spain) Castro	Husqvarna	16	13	3
17	(Italy) Cabini	Beta	17	15	1
	(Spain) Vall	Sherco	18	Ret	0
	(Argentina) Giordani	Beta	Ret	DNS	0
Pos	Rider	Bike	FRA (France)		Points

== Open World Cup ==
=== Open 2-Stroke ===
Team	Constructor	No	Rider	Rounds
Vent Moto	Honda	1	(Italy) Daniele Delbono	5
Vent Moto	Honda	1	(Italy) Matteo Bresolin	7
MRS Sherco	Sherco	5	(United Kingdom) Richard Tucker	1–3
MRS Sherco	Sherco	40	(United Kingdom) Alfie Webb	7
	Yamaha	8	(Italy) Roberto Gatti	5
Beta Portugal	Beta	10	(Portugal) João Lourenço	2, 7
Team Pohlenz	KTM	11	(Germany) Leonard Pohlenz	5
ODY Racing Team	Beta	13	(Slovakia) Patrik Halgas	6
Team VSM Off-Road	Beta	14	(France) Stephane Milachon	1–2
Motoextreme Gas Gas	Gas Gas	17	(Portugal) Gonçalo Reis	1–5, 7
R4E Team	KTM	19	(Netherlands) Rik Vierhuizen	1
R4E Team	KTM	20	(Netherlands) Kaiya Brouwer	1
KTM Enduro Experience	KTM	19	(United Kingdom) Jack Cadwallader	7
	Beta	22	(Austria) Martin Ortner	1
365 Games	KTM	23	(United Kingdom) Cole Cookland	1, 7
MotoHora	Gas Gas	23	(Czech Republic) Radek Adam	6
Yamaha Racing Worksbike Team	Yamaha	24	(Greece) George Pisimanis	4
	KTM	27	(Italy) Edoardo D'Errico	5
Yamaha Off-Road Experience	Yamaha	27	(United Kingdom) Charlie Chater	7
	TM	29	(France) Steve Pasco	7
	Beta	31	(Netherlands) Tom Smit	1
	Husqvarna	33	(Germany) Matthias Lehmann	1
Team Sturm	KTM	38	(Germany) Maik Schubert	1, 5–7
Rider's Lounge Erzgebirge	Beta	44	(Germany) Matthias Albrecht	1
Offroadshop Kölbach Racing Team	Beta	55	(Germany) Tom Kölbach	1, 5
	KTM	62	(United Kingdom) Martin Yardley	7
KTM GST Berlin Racing	KTM	65	(Germany) Nico Rambow	1, 5–7
	KTM	67	(Italy) Jacopo Crepaldi	5
Nunez Motor	Gas Gas	69	(Spain) Jorge Paradelo	2–3, 7
Klobaitis Racing Team	KTM	69	(Lithuania) Donatas Petrikas	6
GG Pons Team	Gas Gas	83	(Spain) Benet Gomez	2–3, 5–7
KTM Dresden MRZ	Husqvarna	92	(Germany) Daniel Mörbe	1, 5–7
KTM Novi Korona Kielce	Gas Gas	96	(Poland) Rafal Bracik	1, 6
Team Gas Gas Kadelack	Gas Gas	99	(Germany) Eddie Findling	1
	Beta	99	(Greece) Dimitrios Karakousis	4

=== Riders Championship ===
Pos	Rider	Bike	GER (Germany)		POR (Portugal)		ESP (Spain)		GRE (Greece)		ITA (Italy)		CZE (Czech Republic)		FRA (France)		Points
1	(Portugal) Reis	Gas Gas	1	5	1	1	1	1	1	1	1	1			1	1	160
2	(Spain) Gomez	Gas Gas			5	5	2	3			3	2	2	2	2	2	132
3	(Germany) Rambow	KTM	3	3							2	3	4	Ret	5	7	95
4	(Spain) Paradelo	Gas Gas			3	3	3	2							6	3	87
5	(Germany) Schubert	KTM	7	7							4	4	6	4	12	9	78
6	(United Kingdom) Tucker	Sherco	2	1	4	4	Ret	DNS									63
7	(Germany) Mörbe	Husqvarna	8	6							6	Ret	5	5	11	8	63
8	(Poland) Bracik	Gas Gas	5	2									3	3			58
9	(Portugal) Lourenço	Beta			2	2									7	5	54
10	(Slovakia) Halgas	Beta											1	1			40
11	(Greece) Pisimanis	Yamaha							2	2							34
12	(United Kingdom) Cadwallader	KTM													3	4	28
13	(Austria) Ortner	Husqvarna	4	4													26
14	(United Kingdom) Chater	Yamaha													4	6	23
15	(Germany) Pohlenz	KTM									5	5					22
16	(United Kingdom) Cookland	KTM	Ret	8											9	10	21
17	(Czech Republic) Adam	Gas Gas											7	6			19
18	(Germany) Kölbach	Beta	11	11							7	Ret					19
19	(Lithuania) Petrikas	KTM											8	7			17
20	(Netherlands) Brouwer	KTM	9	9													14
21	(United Kingdom) Webb	Sherco													8	12	12
22	(Germany) Findling	Gas Gas	10	10													12
23	(United Kingdom) Yardley	KTM													10	11	11
24	(Netherlands) Vierhuizen	KTM	6	Ret													10
25	(Germany) Albrecht	Beta	12	13													7
26	(Italy) Bresolin	Honda													13	13	6
27	(Netherlands) Smit	Beta	Ret	12													4
28	(France) Pasco	TM													14	Ret	2
29	(Germany) Lehmann	Husqvarna	Ret	14													2
	(France) Milachon	Beta	Ret	Ret	Ret	DNS											0
	(Greece) Karakousis	Beta							Ret	Ret							0
	(Italy) Delbono	Honda									Ret	Ret					0
	(Italy) Gatti	Yamaha									Ret	Ret					0
	(Italy) D'Errico	KTM									Ret	Ret					0
	(Italy) Crepaldi	KTM									Ret	Ret					0
Pos	Rider	Bike	GER (Germany)		POR (Portugal)		ESP (Spain)		GRE (Greece)		ITA (Italy)		CZE (Czech Republic)		FRA (France)		Points

=== Open 4-Stroke ===
Team	Constructor	No	Rider	Rounds
Altop Kunststoftechniek	Husqvarna	1	(Netherlands) Bas Klein Haneveld	1
Honda Redmoto World Enduro Team	Honda	1	(Italy) Nicola Lazzaroni	5
Honda Redmoto World Enduro Team	Honda	32	(Italy) Daniele Consonni	5
	Husqvarna	2	(Netherlands) Thijs Bulten	1
TM Racing Czech	TM	2	(Czech Republic) Petr Machek	6
Husqvarna Belgium	Husqvarna	3	(Belgium) Jilani Cambre	3, 5
	Husqvarna	6	(Italy) Giorgio Sfondrini	5
Yamaha Off-Road Experience	Yamaha	7	(United Kingdom) Fraser Flockhart	1–3, 6
	KTM	9	(Czech Republic) Radim Prousek	6
Midshires Catering ltd	Yamaha	9	(United Kingdom) Jack Ditchfield	7
Team Holeshot Kawasaki	Kawasaki	10	(United Kingdom) Thomas Ellwood	2–3, 5–6
KTM GST Berlin Racing	KTM	11	(Germany) Paul Rossbach	5
KTM GST Berlin Racing	KTM	14	(Germany) Robert Riedel	1, 5–7
Beta Belgium	Beta	12	(Belgium) Mathias Van Hoof	1–2, 4, 6–7
	Honda	15	(France) Alexis Estival	7
	KTM	17	(Portugal) Rodrigo Belchior	2–3, 7
	Honda	20	(France) Quentin Dupre	7
Yamaha Racing Worksbike Team	Yamaha	21	(Greece) Xeno Angelus	4
Yamaha Racing Worksbike Team	Yamaha	25	(Greece) Dimitris Maragkos	4
	KTM	21	(France) Clement Brunet	7
Team Saint Yorre Motos	Yamaha	22	(France) Theo Sechaud	7
	Yamaha	23	(France) Pierre Deffradas	7
Kapybara Racing Team	Sherco	25	(Czech Republic) Jakub Zabransky	6
	KTM	28	(Greece) Xristos Samatialis	4
	Husqvarna	28	(Germany) Walther Schneider	6
	Honda	30	(France) Corentin Faure	7
Jetmar KTM	KTM	31	(Portugal) Luis Oliveira	1
Sherco Academy Deutschland	Sherco	31	(Germany) Nick Emmrich	6
Markus Kehr Sherco Academy	Sherco	32	(Germany) Bastian Streit	1, 6
	Honda	39	(France) Dylan Levesque	7
Team Walzer KTM	KTM	41	(Austria) Bernhard Schöpf	1
Team Sturm	KTM	42	(Germany) Alexander Gehlert	1–3, 6–7
JET Zanardo	KTM	48	(Chile) Enzo Pellegrini	1
Lousã Motos	Honda	52	(Portugal) Diogo Ventura	
	Suzuki	52	(Greece) Panagiotis Zafiriou	4
ADAC Mittelrhein	Husqvarna	66	(Germany) Rene Schilling	1–3, 5–7
AG Dakar Team	KTM	69	(Lithuania) Arunas Gelazninkas	5
MPR Team	KTM	72	(Italy) Michele Dal Pezzo	5
Team Pro Racing Sport	Honda	73	(Italy) Diego Lupatini	5
	Husqvarna	75	(Greece) Konstadinos Nikias	4
Jetmar Husqvarna	Husqvarna	76	(Portugal) Joana Gonçalves	2–3
	KTM	85	(Greece) Giannis Chasapis	4
Monster Shop	Honda	87	(Greece) Christos Papatheodorou	4
	Honda	88	(Cyprus) Ioannis Charalambous	4
TeamAC95	Husqvarna	95	(Spain) Abel Carballes	2–3
	Sherco	96	(Italy) Pietro Enrico Collovigh	5

=== Riders Championship ===
Pos	Rider	Bike	GER (Germany)		POR (Portugal)		ESP (Spain)		GRE (Greece)		ITA (Italy)		CZE (Czech Republic)		FRA (France)		Points
1	(United Kingdom) Ellwood	Kawasaki			1	1	1	1			3	2	1	1			152
2	(Germany) Riedel	KTM	2	2							1	1	3	3	2	2	138
3	(Belgium) Van Hoof	Beta	6	6	3	3			Ret	1			4	4	1	1	126
4	(United Kingdom) Flockhart	Yamaha	4	3	2	2	3	3					2	2			126
5	(Portugal) Belchior	KTM			4	5	5	5							5	5	68
6	(Germany) Gehlert	KTM	9	11	Ret	6	6	6					8	9	8	8	68
7	(Germany) Schilling	Husqvarna	10	10	5	8	8	8			DSQ	Ret	11	10	9	11	60
8	(Austria) Schöpf	KTM	1	1													40
9	(Spain) Carballes	Husqvarna			Ret	4	4	4									39
10	(Germany) Streit	Sherco	7	9									6	6			36
11	(Belgium) Cambre	Husqvarna					2	2			Ret	Ret					34
12	(Italy) Collovigh	Sherco									2	3					32
13	(Greece) Nikias	Husqvarna							3	2							32
14	(Greece) Zafiriou	Suzuki							2	3							32
15	(France) Levesque	Honda													3	3	30
16	(Portugal) Oliveira	KTM	3	4													28
17	(Portugal) Gonçalves	Husqvarna			Ret	7	7	7									27
18	(United Kingdom) Ditchfield	Yamaha													4	4	26
19	(Italy) Dal Pezzo	KTM									6	4					23
20	(Greece) Samatialis	KTM							4	6							23
21	(Germany) Emmrich	Sherco											5	5			22
22	(Netherlands) Klein Haneveld	Husqvarna	5	5													22
23	(Greece) Chasapis	KTM							1	Ret							20
24	(France) Estival	Honda													7	6	19
25	(France) Dupre	Honda													6	7	19
26	(Czech Republic) Prousek	KTM											7	8			17
27	(Germany) Schneider	Husqvarna											9	7			16
28	(Netherlands) Bulten	Husqvarna	8	8													16
29	(Chile) Pellegrini	Husqvarna	11	7													14
30	(Italy) Lupatini	Honda									4	Ret					13
31	(Greece) Angelus	Yamaha							Ret	4							13
32	(France) Brunet	KTM													11	9	12
33	(France) Sechaud	Yamaha													10	10	12
34	(Lithuania) Gelazninkas	KTM									5	DNS					11
35	(Cyprus) Charalambous	Honda							Ret	5							11
36	(Czech Republic) Zabransky	Sherco											10	11			11
37	(France) Faure	Honda													12	12	8
38	(France) Deffradas	Yamaha													13	13	6
	(Greece) Maragkos	Yamaha							Ret	Ret							0
	(Italy) Lazzaroni	Honda									Ret	Ret					0
	(Italy) Sfondrini	Husqvarna									Ret	Ret					0
	(Italy) Consonni	Honda									Ret	Ret					0
	(Greece) Papatheodorou	Honda							Ret	DNS							0
	(Germany) Rossbach	KTM									Ret	DNS					0
	(Czech Republic) Machek	TM											Ret	DNS			0
Pos	Rider	Bike	GER (Germany)		POR (Portugal)		ESP (Spain)		GRE (Greece)		ITA (Italy)		CZE (Czech Republic)		FRA (France)		Points
