= Andrea Verona =

Italian enduro racer

- Nationality: Italian
- Born: 22 April 1999 (age 27); Thiene
- Current team: Red Bull KTM Factory Racing
- Bike number: 99

Andrea Verona (born 22 April 1999) is an Italian professional Enduro racer. Verona is a seven-time FIM Enduro World Champion, winning titles from 2020 to 2026.

Verona has won the overall EnduroGP title on one occasion, during the 2022 season. In addition, he has won three titles in the Enduro 1 class and three in the Enduro 2 class.

Verona has been part of three Italian teams that have won the International Six Days Enduro, in 2021, 2025 and 2026. At the 2026 edition, Verona was the event winner individually for the first time.

== Career ==
Verona first came to attention on the world stage when he won the Youth class of the 2017 FIM Enduro World Championship, whilst riding at TM. The following season, he moved into the Junior category in EnduroGP, winning the Junior 1 class title and finishing runner-up in the overall Junior standings in the 2018 FIM Enduro World Championship. In addition to this, Verona formed part of the victorious Italian Junior Trophy team at the International Six Days Enduro.

Verona was able to take the overall Junior title in the 2019 FIM Enduro World Championship with two rounds to spare. Stepping up to EnduroGP during the COVID-19 pandemic-impacted 2020 FIM Enduro World Championship, Verona was able to become world champion in the Enduro 1 category in his debut season. Ahead of the following season, he left TM to join Gas Gas on their return to EnduroGP. This move saw him successfully defend his Enduro 1 title and finish third in the overall EnduroGP standings. In addition to this, Verona was part of the victorious Italian World Trophy team at the 2021 International Six Days Enduro.

Verona's consistency paid off during the 2022 FIM Enduro World Championship, only taking one day win in the overall EnduroGP class but coming away with the title ahead of Josep García. Alongside this, he successfully defended his Enduro 1 title, winning all but the second day at the Slovakian round in the process. Verona also won the Italian Enduro championship in the overall Assoluta category, as well as the individual 250cc 4 stroke class. For the 2023 season, Verona changed to compete in the Enduro 2, to compete aboard a 450cc motorcycle. The move would see him lose the overall EnduroGP crown, finishing third in the 2023 FIM Enduro World Championship and also end as runner-up to Steve Holcombe in the Enduro 2 class. Whilst not winning a title in the World Championship, Verona did pick up the 450cc title in the Italian Championship and win the individual Enduro 2 class at the ISDE.

In his second season in the Enduro 2 class, Verona was able to take the class title in dominant fashion, winning all but the second day at the opening round. Overall, he finished third in EnduroGP, behind Josep García and Steve Holcombe - with three day wins to his name. Domestically, Verona was able to defend his 450cc title in the Italian Championship. During the 2025 FIM Enduro World Championship, Verona was in close contention with Josep García for the overall EnduroGP crown, but ultimately finished as runner-up to the Spaniard. He was able to successfully defend his Enduro 2 class title, seeing off the challenge from Frenchman Zach Pichon. With the International Six Days Enduro taking place in his native Italy, Verona formed part of the World Trophy team that won the event, his second time as a winning team member. At the end of the 2025 season, it was announced that Verona would move from Gas Gas to sister brand KTM for the 2026 season.

Following his switch to KTM, Verona would again finish as runner-up to García in the overall EnduroGP class of the 2026 FIM Enduro World Championship. Success would come in the E2 class however, as he successfully defended his title, after another season long battle with Zach Pichon. As captain of the Italian team at the ISDE, he managed to win the event overall for the first time, with the team making it back-to-back victories at the event. Verona again defended his 450cc class title in the Italian Championship successfully.

== Honours ==
Enduro World Championship

- EnduroGP: 2022 (gold)
- Enduro 1: 2020, 2021 & 2022 (gold)
- Enduro 2: 2024, 2025 & 2026 (gold)
- Junior: 2019 (gold)
- Youth: 2017 (gold)

International Six Days Enduro

- World Trophy: 2021, 2025 & 2026 (Italy) (gold)
- Junior Trophy: 2018 (Italy) (gold)
- Individual Overall: 2026 (gold)
- Enduro 2 Overall: 2023 & 2026 (gold)

Italian Enduro Championship

- Assoluta: 2022 (gold)
- 450: 2023, 2024, 2025 & 2026 (gold)
- 250 4 stroke: 2022 (gold)
- Junior: 2019 (gold)
- Youth: 2017 (gold)
