= 2022 FIM Enduro World Championship =

2022 world enduro championship season

The 2022 World Enduro Championship is the 33rd season of the FIM World Enduro Championship. The season consists of seven events.

Brad Freeman goes into the championship after winning both the EnduroGP and Enduro 3 classes in 2021. Andrea Verona is the reigning Enduro 1 champion, with Josep García going into the season after taking the Enduro 2 title the previous season.

This will be the first season in which Prime Stadium take up the role as championship promoter, with the previous season being under direct control of the FIM.

== Calendar ==
A seven-round calendar was announced in October 2021. The calendar was later updated in January 2022, with the Swedish round cancelled and replaced with a second Portuguese round.

| Round | Event | Location | Dates |
|---|---|---|---|
| 1 | Spain | Lalín | 6–8 May |
| 2 | Portugal | Peso da Régua | 13–15 May |
| 3 | Italy | Carpineti | 24–26 June |
| 4 | Portugal | Coimbra | 1–3 July |
| 5 | Slovakia | Gelnica | 29–31 July |
| 6 | Hungary | Zalaegerszeg | 5–7 August |
| 7 | Germany | Zschopau | 14–16 October |

== EnduroGP ==
=== Riders Championship ===
| Pos | Rider | Bike | Class | ESP (Spain) | | POR (Portugal) | | ITA (Italy) | | POR (Portugal) | | SVK (Slovakia) | | HUN (Hungary) | | GER (Germany) | | Points |
|---|---|---|---|---|---|---|---|---|---|---|---|---|---|---|---|---|---|---|
| 1 | (Italy) Andrea Verona | Gas Gas | Enduro 1 | 1 | 2 | 3 | 3 | 3 | 2 | 2 | 2 | 2 | 5 | 3 | 2 | 5 | 3 | 219 |
| 2 | (Spain) Josep García | KTM | Enduro 2 | 4 | 1 | 2 | 2 | 1 | 16 | | | 4 | 3 | 1 | 1 | 1 | 1 | 195 |
| 3 | (Australia) Wil Ruprecht | TM | Enduro 2 | 3 | 4 | 1 | 1 | 2 | 1 | 13 | 14 | 1 | 1 | DSQ | 3 | 4 | 14 | 180 |
| 4 | (United Kingdom) Nathan Watson | Honda | Enduro 2 | 5 | 7 | 6 | 7 | 4 | 3 | 1 | 1 | 9 | 7 | 2 | 9 | 6 | 4 | 170 |
| 5 | (United Kingdom) Steve Holcombe | Beta | Enduro 2 | 2 | 14 | | | 10 | Ret | 4 | 3 | 3 | 2 | 7 | 8 | 3 | 6 | 127 |
| 6 | (Italy) Thomas Oldrati | Honda | Enduro 1 | 7 | 6 | 4 | 4 | 6 | 4 | 7 | 10 | 6 | 4 | 22 | 16 | 7 | 7 | 124 |
| 7 | (United Kingdom) Brad Freeman | Beta | Enduro 3 | 9 | 3 | 5 | 23 | 25 | 11 | 10 | 4 | 5 | 6 | 23 | 19 | 2 | 2 | 112 |
| 8 | (Sweden) Mikael Persson | Husqvarna | Enduro 3 | 18 | 12 | 13 | 9 | 8 | 7 | 15 | 8 | 7 | 8 | 14 | 7 | 8 | 5 | 87 |
| 9 | (Australia) Daniel Milner | Fantic | Enduro 2 | 11 | 10 | 14 | 14 | | | | | | | | | | | 76 |
| 9 | (Australia) Daniel Milner | Fantic | Enduro 1 | | | | | 5 | 5 | 3 | Ret | 18 | DNS | 6 | Ret | 9 | 9 | 76 |
| 10 | (Italy) Matteo Cavallo | TM | Enduro 1 | 20 | 9 | 8 | 10 | 9 | 14 | 8 | 11 | 11 | 9 | 8 | 11 | 17 | 16 | 68 |
| 11 | (France) Hugo Blanjoue | KTM | Enduro 2 | 15 | 17 | 19 | 11 | 7 | 6 | 5 | 7 | 15 | Ret | 9 | 6 | Ret | DNS | 63 |
| 12 | (Italy) Alex Salvini | Husqvarna | Enduro 2 | 8 | 16 | 9 | 6 | Ret | DNS | | | 27 | 17 | 5 | 5 | 19 | Ret | 47 |
| 13 | (Italy) Matteo Pavoni | TM | Enduro 3 | 14 | 11 | 15 | 16 | 12 | 12 | 12 | 13 | 8 | 10 | 15 | 20 | Ret | 12 | 42 |
| 14 | (Spain) Marc Sans | Husqvarna | Enduro 3 | 24 | 15 | 22 | 18 | 21 | 10 | 26 | 5 | 14 | 15 | 16 | 4 | 14 | 17 | 36 |
| 15 | (United Kingdom) Jamie McCanney | Husqvarna | Enduro 1 | 16 | 18 | 25 | 21 | 15 | 17 | 14 | 15 | 13 | 14 | 4 | 10 | 11 | Ret | 33 |
| 16 | (Belgium) Antoine Magain | Sherco | Enduro 1 | 13 | 23 | 11 | 12 | 11 | 13 | 9 | DSQ | 21 | Ret | 19 | 13 | Ret | 13 | 33 |
| 17 | (New Zealand) Hamish MacDonald | Sherco | Enduro 2 | 6 | 5 | 7 | DNS | | | | | | | | | | | 30 |
| 18 | (France) Léo Le Quéré | Sherco | Enduro 3 | Ret | 26 | | | 18 | 9 | 20 | 16 | 10 | 13 | 18 | 12 | 13 | 10 | 29 |
| 19 | (Italy) Davide Guarneri | Fantic | Enduro 3 | 12 | 8 | 10 | 8 | | | | | | | | | | | 26 |
| 20 | (United Kingdom) Daniel McCanney | Sherco | Enduro 3 | 17 | 13 | 18 | 22 | 20 | 18 | 25 | 23 | 12 | 11 | 17 | 21 | 10 | 8 | 26 |
| 21 | (France) Theophile Espinasse | Beta | Enduro 1 | 10 | 22 | 12 | 5 | 16 | Ret | 19 | 17 | 17 | Ret | | | | | 21 |
| 22 | (Italy) Samuele Bernardini | Honda | Enduro 1 | 32 | 25 | 16 | 30 | 28 | 26 | 6 | 9 | 28 | 18 | 13 | 22 | | | 20 |
| 23 | (France) Loïc Larrieu | Fantic | Enduro 1 | 19 | 20 | 26 | 17 | 14 | 8 | 17 | Ret | | | | | 12 | 11 | 19 |
| 24 | (Czech Republic) Kryštof Kouble | Husqvarna | Enduro 2 | 22 | 21 | 23 | 13 | 13 | 15 | 16 | 6 | 25 | Ret | 24 | 17 | | | 17 |
| 25 | (Sweden) Albin Elowson | Husqvarna | Enduro 2 | | | | | | | | | 20 | 12 | 10 | 14 | | | 12 |
| 26 | (Spain) Jaume Betriu | KTM | Enduro 3 | | | | | 22 | 20 | 22 | 20 | 26 | 16 | 12 | 15 | 15 | 15 | 7 |
| 27 | (France) Antoine Basset | Beta | Enduro 3 | 21 | 24 | 17 | 15 | 23 | 21 | 11 | 18 | 24 | 19 | Ret | DNS | | | 6 |
| 28 | (Brazil) Bruno Crivilin | Honda | Enduro 1 | 23 | 31 | 20 | 19 | 27 | 19 | 21 | 21 | 16 | 20 | 11 | 18 | 21 | 21 | 5 |
| 29 | (Italy) Giacomo Redondi | Gas Gas | Enduro 2 | | | | | 26 | 24 | 18 | 12 | Ret | Ret | 21 | 23 | | | 4 |
| Pos | Rider | Bike | Class | ESP (Spain) | | POR (Portugal) | | ITA (Italy) | | POR (Portugal) | | SVK (Slovakia) | | HUN (Hungary) | | GER (Germany) | | Points |

=== Enduro 1 ===
Enduro 1 is for motorcycles up to and including 250cc, both 2-stroke and 4-stroke.

| Team | Constructor | No | Rider | Rounds |
|---|---|---|---|---|
| Fantic Factory Racing E50 Team | Fantic | 4 | (France) Loïc Larrieu | 1–4, 7 |
| Fantic D'Arpa Racing Team | Fantic | 5 | (Australia) Daniel Milner (Note: Daniel Milner is not allowed to score points and be in the standings in the E1 class because he started the season in the E2 class. A rider who changes class (for example from E2 to E1) is allowed to continue to score points in the overall EnduroGP ranking but not in the class ranking.) | 3–7 |
| Lunigiana Honda RedMoto Team | Honda | 6 | (Italy) Samuele Bernardini | 1–6 |
| JET Zanardo Racing Team | Husqvarna | 10 | (Italy) Davide Soreca | 1–6 |
| S2 Motorsports Honda RedMoto | Honda | 11 | (Brazil) Bruno Crivilin | All |
| Team Beta Oxmoto | Beta | 17 | (France) Theophile Espinasse | 1–5 |
| Fast Eddy Racing Team | Husqvarna | 18 | (United Kingdom) Jamie McCanney | All |
| Fast Eddy Racing Team | Husqvarna | 118 | (United Kingdom) Jack Edmondson | 7 |
| Honda RedMoto World Enduro Team | Honda | 22 | (Italy) Thomas Oldrati | All |
| TM Boano Factory Team | TM | 25 | (Italy) Matteo Cavallo | All |
| TM Boano Factory Team | TM | 46 | (Italy) Jordi Gardiol | 1–5, 7 |
| WPM KTM Team | KTM | 44 | (Australia) Scott Noble | 4 |
| Team KTM GST Berlin | KTM | 48 | (Germany) Edward Hübner | All |
| JWR Honda Racing | Honda | 55 | (Sweden) Oskar Ljungström | 1–2 |
| Rieju Motorcycles | Rieju | 60 | (Spain) Pau Tomàs | 1–3 |
| Sherco Factory Racing | Sherco | 71 | (Belgium) Antoine Magain | 1–6, 7 |
| KTM Team Pro Racing Sport | KTM | 88 | (Norway) Kevin Burud | All |
| Gas Gas Factory Racing | Gas Gas | 99 | (Italy) Andrea Verona | All |
| Oliveira Racing Team | Yamaha | 131 | (Portugal) Luis Oliveira | 2 |

=== Riders Championship ===
| Pos | Rider | Bike | ESP (Spain) | | POR (Portugal) | | ITA (Italy) | | POR (Portugal) | | SVK (Slovakia) | | HUN (Hungary) | | GER (Germany) | | Points |
|---|---|---|---|---|---|---|---|---|---|---|---|---|---|---|---|---|---|
| 1 | (Italy) Andrea Verona | Gas Gas | 1 | 1 | 1 | 1 | 1 | 1 | 1 | 1 | 1 | 2 | 1 | 1 | 1 | 1 | 277 |
| 2 | (Italy) Thomas Oldrati | Honda | 2 | 2 | 2 | 2 | 3 | 2 | 4 | 3 | 2 | 1 | 9 | 5 | 2 | 2 | 222 |
| 3 | (Italy) Matteo Cavallo | TM | 7 | 3 | 3 | 4 | 3 | 5 | 4 | 4 | 3 | 3 | 3 | 3 | 5 | 5 | 186 |
| 4 | (United Kingdom) Jamie McCanney | Husqvarna | 5 | 4 | 9 | 9 | 6 | 6 | 6 | 5 | 4 | 4 | 2 | 2 | 3 | Ret | 154 |
| 5 | (Belgium) Antoine Magain | Sherco | 4 | 8 | 4 | 5 | 4 | 4 | 5 | DSQ | 8 | Ret | 6 | 4 | Ret | 4 | 126 |
| 6 | (Brazil) Bruno Crivilin | Honda | 8 | 13 | 7 | 7 | 10 | 7 | 9 | 8 | 5 | 6 | 4 | 6 | 8 | 8 | 119 |
| 7 | (Italy) Samuele Bernardini | Honda | 14 | 9 | 6 | 15 | 11 | 9 | 2 | 2 | 9 | 5 | 5 | 7 | | | 104 |
| 8 | (France) Loïc Larrieu | Fantic | 6 | 6 | 10 | 6 | 5 | 3 | 7 | Ret | | | | | 4 | 3 | 99 |
| 9 | (Italy) Davide Soreca | Husqvarna | 10 | 5 | 8 | 8 | 8 | 8 | 11 | 9 | 7 | 7 | 7 | Ret | | | 88 |
| 10 | (France) Theophile Espinasse | Beta | 3 | 7 | 5 | 3 | 7 | Ret | 8 | 6 | 6 | Ret | | | | | 87 |
| 11 | (Germany) Edward Hübner | KTM | 12 | 12 | 14 | 11 | 13 | Ret | 12 | 10 | 10 | 8 | 9 | 8 | 9 | 7 | 73 |
| 12 | (Norway) Kevin Burud | KTM | 15 | 14 | Ret | Ret | Ret | 11 | 13 | 11 | 11 | 9 | 10 | 9 | 10 | 9 | 54 |
| 13 | (Italy) Jordi Gardiol | TM | 9 | Ret | 11 | 10 | 9 | Ret | 10 | 7 | Ret | DNS | | | 6 | Ret | 50 |
| 14 | (Spain) Pau Tomàs | Rieju | 13 | 10 | 13 | 13 | 12 | 10 | | | | | | | | | 25 |
| 15 | (United Kingdom) Jack Edmondson | Husqvarna | | | | | | | | | | | | | 7 | 6 | 19 |
| 16 | (Sweden) Oskar Ljungström | Honda | 11 | 11 | 12 | 14 | | | | | | | | | | | 16 |
| 17 | (Portugal) Luis Oliveira | Yamaha | | | 15 | 12 | | | | | | | | | | | 5 |
| Pos | Rider | Bike | ESP (Spain) | | POR (Portugal) | | ITA (Italy) | | POR (Portugal) | | SVK (Slovakia) | | HUN (Hungary) | | GER (Germany) | | Points |

=== Enduro 2 ===
Enduro 2 is for 4-stroke motorcycles from 255cc-450cc.

| Team | Constructor | No | Rider | Rounds |
|---|---|---|---|---|
| Fantic D'Arpa Racing Team | Fantic | 5 | (Australia) Daniel Milner | 1–2 |
| JET Zanardo Racing Team | Husqvarna | 9 | (Italy) Alex Salvini | 1–3, 5–7 |
| Red Bull KTM Factory Racing | KTM | 26 | (Spain) Josep García | 1–3, 5–7 |
| Elite Moto 15 Enduro Team | KTM | 56 | (France) Hugo Blanjoue | All |
| TM Boano Factory Team | TM | 57 | (Australia) Wil Ruprecht | All |
| Beta Factory Enduro Team | Beta | 70 | (United Kingdom) Steve Holcombe | 1, 3–7 |
| Sherco Factory Racing | Sherco | 76 | (New Zealand) Hamish MacDonald | 1–2 |
| GTG Motogamma | Gas Gas | 81 | (Italy) Giacomo Redondi | 3–6 |
| Honda Racing RedMoto World Enduro Team | Honda | 91 | (United Kingdom) Nathan Watson | All |
| JWR Honda Racing | Honda | 112 | (Sweden) Anton Lundgren | 1–2 |
| Husqvarna Scandinavia | Husqvarna | 113 | (Sweden) Albin Elowson | 5–6 |
| KBS Team | Husqvarna | 123 | (Czech Republic) Kryštof Kouble | 1–6 |
| KBS Team | Husqvarna | 196 | (Czech Republic) Jakub Hroneš | All |
| Motostar/Motoclub Regnano | Beta | 223 | (Italy) Pietro Pini | 3 |
| AMS Dirtbikes powered by MXM Motorsports | Beta | 244 | (Germany) Philipp Müller | 7 |

=== Riders Championship ===
| Pos | Rider | Bike | ESP (Spain) | | POR (Portugal) | | ITA (Italy) | | POR (Portugal) | | SVK (Slovakia) | | HUN (Hungary) | | GER (Germany) | | Points |
|---|---|---|---|---|---|---|---|---|---|---|---|---|---|---|---|---|---|
| 1 | (Australia) Wil Ruprecht | TM | 2 | 2 | 1 | 1 | 2 | 1 | 4 | 6 | 1 | 1 | DSQ | 2 | 3 | 4 | 219 |
| 2 | (Spain) Josep García | KTM | 3 | 1 | 2 | 2 | 1 | 5 | | | 3 | 3 | 1 | 1 | 1 | 1 | 210 |
| 3 | (United Kingdom) Nathan Watson | Honda | 4 | 4 | 3 | 4 | 3 | 2 | 1 | 1 | 4 | 4 | 2 | 6 | 4 | 2 | 209 |
| 4 | (United Kingdom) Steve Holcombe | Beta | 1 | 6 | | | 5 | Ret | 2 | 2 | 2 | 2 | 4 | 5 | 2 | 3 | 165 |
| 5 | (France) Hugo Blanjoue | KTM | 8 | 8 | 7 | 5 | 4 | 3 | 3 | 4 | 5 | Ret | 5 | 4 | Ret | DNS | 127 |
| 6 | (Czech Republic) Kryštof Kouble | Husqvarna | 9 | 9 | 8 | 6 | 6 | 4 | 5 | 3 | 7 | Ret | 8 | 8 | | | 106 |
| 7 | (Italy) Alex Salvini | Husqvarna | 6 | 7 | 5 | 3 | Ret | DNS | | | 8 | 6 | 3 | 3 | 5 | Ret | 104 |
| 8 | (Czech Republic) Jakub Hroneš | Husqvarna | 11 | 11 | 9 | Ret | 8 | 7 | 7 | 7 | 9 | 7 | 9 | 10 | 7 | Ret | 90 |
| 9 | (Italy) Giacomo Redondi | Gas Gas | | | | | 7 | 6 | 6 | 5 | Ret | Ret | 7 | 9 | | | 56 |
| 10 | (Sweden) Albin Elowson | Husqvarna | | | | | | | | | 6 | 5 | 6 | 7 | | | 40 |
| 11 | (New Zealand) Hamish MacDonald | Sherco | 5 | 3 | 4 | DNS | | | | | | | | | | | 39 |
| 12 | (Australia) Daniel Milner | Fantic | 7 | 5 | 6 | 7 | | | | | | | | | | | 39 |
| 13 | (Italy) Pietro Pini | Husqvarna | | | | | 9 | 8 | | | | | | | | | 15 |
| 14 | (Sweden) Anton Lundgren | Honda | 10 | 10 | Ret | Ret | | | | | | | | | | | 12 |
| 15 | (Germany) Philipp Müller | Beta | | | | | | | | | | | | | 6 | Ret | 10 |
| Pos | Rider | Bike | ESP (Spain) | | POR (Portugal) | | ITA (Italy) | | POR (Portugal) | | SVK (Slovakia) | | HUN (Hungary) | | GER (Germany) | | Points |

=== Enduro 3 ===
Enduro 3 is for 2-stroke motorcycles over 255cc and 4-stroke motorcycles over 455cc.

| Team | Constructor | No | Rider | Rounds |
|---|---|---|---|---|
| Husqvarna Motorcycles Spain | Husqvarna | 2 | (Spain) Marc Sans | All |
| Atomic Moto | Beta | 7 | (France) Antoine Basset | 1–6 |
| Sherco Academy France | Sherco | 8 | (France) Léo Le Quéré | 1, 3–7 |
| Beta Factory Enduro Team | Beta | 12 | (United Kingdom) Brad Freeman | All |
| Fantic Factory Racing E50 Team | Fantic | 20 | (France) Valérian Debaud | 3 |
| Fantic Factory Racing E50 Team | Fantic | 39 | (Italy) Davide Guarneri | 1–2 |
| Sherco Factory Racing | Sherco | 43 | (United Kingdom) Daniel McCanney | All |
| Team Beta Oxmoto | Beta | 69 | (France) Antoine Criq | All |
| Beta UK | Beta | 77 | (United Kingdom) Daniel Mundell | 5–6 |
| Beta UK | Beta | 148 | (United Kingdom) Harry Houghton | 7 |
| WP Eric Augé KTM | KTM | 94 | (Spain) Jaume Betriu | 3–7 |
| TM Boano Factory Team | TM | 98 | (Italy) Matteo Pavoni | All |
| Husqvarna Factory Racing | Husqvarna | 157 | (United Kingdom) Billy Bolt | 3 |
| Husqvarna Factory Racing | Husqvarna | 169 | (Sweden) Mikael Persson | All |
| WISE Beta Racing | Beta | 225 | (Japan) Tomoki Ogami | 3 |
| Husqvarna Offroad Racing NZ | Husqvarna | 243 | (New Zealand) Dylan Yearbury | 5–6 |
| Sherco Hungary | Sherco | 251 | (Hungary) Márk Szőke | 6 |

=== Riders Championship ===
| Pos | Rider | Bike | ESP (Spain) | | POR (Portugal) | | ITA (Italy) | | POR (Portugal) | | SVK (Slovakia) | | HUN (Hungary) | | GER (Germany) | | Points |
|---|---|---|---|---|---|---|---|---|---|---|---|---|---|---|---|---|---|
| 1 | (United Kingdom) Brad Freeman | Beta | 1 | 1 | 1 | 7 | 9 | 4 | 1 | 1 | 1 | 1 | 7 | 5 | 1 | 1 | 229 |
| 2 | (Sweden) Mikael Persson | Husqvarna | 5 | 4 | 3 | 2 | 1 | 1 | 4 | 3 | 2 | 2 | 2 | 2 | 2 | 2 | 226 |
| 3 | (Italy) Matteo Pavoni | TM | 3 | 3 | 4 | 4 | 2 | 5 | 3 | 4 | 3 | 3 | 3 | 6 | Ret | 5 | 178 |
| 4 | (Spain) Marc Sans | Husqvarna | 7 | 6 | 7 | 5 | 6 | 3 | 9 | 2 | 6 | 6 | 4 | 1 | 5 | 7 | 161 |
| 5 | (United Kingdom) Daniel McCanney | Sherco | 4 | 5 | 6 | 6 | 5 | 6 | 8 | 8 | 5 | 4 | 5 | 7 | 3 | 3 | 155 |
| 6 | (France) Léo Le Quéré | Sherco | Ret | 8 | | | 3 | 2 | 5 | 5 | 4 | 5 | 6 | 3 | 4 | 4 | 137 |
| 7 | (France) Antoine Criq | Beta | 8 | 9 | 8 | 8 | 4 | 10 | 7 | 9 | 7 | 9 | 8 | 8 | 7 | 8 | 115 |
| 8 | (Spain) Jaume Betriu | KTM | | | | | 7 | 7 | 6 | 7 | 10 | 7 | 1 | 4 | 6 | 6 | 105 |
| 9 | (France) Antoine Basset | Beta | 6 | 7 | 5 | 3 | 8 | 8 | 2 | 6 | 9 | 8 | Ret | DNS | | | 103 |
| 10 | (Italy) Davide Guarneri | Fantic | 2 | 2 | 2 | 1 | | | | | | | | | | | 71 |
| 11 | (New Zealand) Dylan Yearbury | Husqvarna | | | | | | | | | 11 | Ret | 11 | 10 | | | 16 |
| 12 | (United Kingdom) Daniel Mundell | Beta | | | | | | | | | 8 | Ret | 9 | Ret | | | 15 |
| 13 | (United Kingdom) Harry Houghton | Beta | | | | | | | | | | | | | 8 | 9 | 15 |
| 14 | (Hungary) Márk Szőke | Sherco | | | | | | | | | | | 10 | 9 | | | 13 |
| 15 | (United Kingdom) Billy Bolt | Husqvarna | | | | | 10 | 9 | | | | | | | | | 13 |
| 16 | (France) Valérian Debaud | Fantic | | | | | 11 | 11 | | | | | | | | | 10 |
| 17 | (Japan) Tomoki Ogami | Beta | | | | | 12 | Ret | | | | | | | | | 4 |
| Pos | Rider | Bike | ESP (Spain) | | POR (Portugal) | | ITA (Italy) | | POR (Portugal) | | SVK (Slovakia) | | HUN (Hungary) | | GER (Germany) | | Points |

== Junior ==
All riders competing in the Junior world championships must be younger than 23 years of age on 1 January of the year of the championship.

=== Riders Championship ===
| Pos | Rider | Bike | Class | ESP (Spain) | | POR (Portugal) | | ITA (Italy) | | POR (Portugal) | | SVK (Slovakia) | | HUN (Hungary) | | GER (Germany) | | Points |
|---|---|---|---|---|---|---|---|---|---|---|---|---|---|---|---|---|---|---|
| 1 | (France) Zach Pichon | Sherco | Junior 1 | 1 | 1 | 1 | 1 | 1 | 1 | 1 | 2 | 3 | 2 | 1 | 1 | 1 | 1 | 269 |
| 2 | (Finland) Roni Kytönen | Honda | Junior 1 | 2 | 2 | 4 | 11 | 2 | 4 | 2 | 1 | 4 | 1 | 2 | 2 | 4 | 2 | 216 |
| 3 | (France) Luc Fargier | Beta | Junior 2 | 4 | 6 | 2 | 2 | 4 | 2 | 3 | 3 | 5 | 4 | 5 | 6 | 7 | 4 | 184 |
| 4 | (Sweden) Max Ahlin | Beta | Junior 2 | 5 | 10 | 12 | 4 | 5 | 3 | 4 | 4 | 1 | 3 | 4 | 7 | 3 | 6 | 168 |
| 5 | (United Kingdom) Jed Etchells | Fantic | Junior 1 | 3 | 3 | 3 | 3 | 3 | 5 | 7 | 7 | 7 | 7 | 11 | 5 | 5 | Ret | 149 |
| 6 | (Sweden) Albin Norrbin | Fantic | Junior 2 | 8 | 9 | 15 | 12 | 9 | 8 | 12 | 8 | 10 | 8 | 3 | 3 | 2 | 3 | 123 |
| 7 | (Spain) Bernat Cortés | Gas Gas | Junior 2 | 10 | 16 | 6 | Ret | 11 | 7 | 8 | 6 | 6 | 6 | 6 | 12 | 6 | 5 | 103 |
| 8 | (Germany) Luca Fischeder | Sherco | Junior 1 | 11 | 13 | 10 | 5 | 6 | 10 | 10 | 5 | 2 | 5 | 13 | 9 | Ret | Ret | 96 |
| 9 | (Italy) Claudio Spanu | Honda | Junior 1 | 14 | 14 | 7 | 8 | 8 | 6 | 11 | 10 | 8 | 9 | 8 | 8 | 18 | 11 | 86 |
| 10 | (Italy) Enrico Rinaldi | Gas Gas | Junior 2 | 15 | 12 | 9 | 10 | 7 | 11 | 6 | 12 | 13 | 14 | 15 | 11 | 11 | 7 | 71 |
| 11 | (Italy) Morgan Lesiardo | Sherco | Junior 2 | 7 | 7 | 13 | 6 | 12 | 27 | 9 | Ret | 12 | 12 | 14 | 14 | 13 | 8 | 65 |
| 12 | (Spain) Alejandro Navarro | Beta | Junior 1 | 16 | 15 | 8 | 7 | 13 | 9 | 13 | 9 | 11 | 11 | 9 | 15 | 14 | 16 | 58 |
| 13 | (Spain) Sergio Navarro | Husqvarna | Junior 1 | 9 | 4 | Ret | DNS | | | | | 9 | Ret | 7 | 4 | Ret | DNS | 49 |
| 14 | (Sweden) Lucas Vågberg | Yamaha | Junior 2 | 6 | 8 | 5 | 9 | 10 | Ret | 18 | 18 | | | | | | | 48 |
| 14 | (Sweden) Lucas Vågberg | Yamaha | Junior 1 | | | | | | | | | | | | | 10 | Ret | 48 |
| 15 | (Italy) Manolo Morettini | KTM | Junior 1 | 18 | 18 | 18 | 14 | 16 | 12 | 5 | 11 | 18 | Ret | 10 | 10 | | | 34 |
| 16 | (Sweden) Axel Semb | KTM | Junior 2 | | | | | 21 | 15 | 14 | 15 | 19 | 10 | 12 | 13 | 8 | 18 | 25 |
| 17 | (Czech Republic) Matěj Škuta | Beta | Junior 2 | 22 | 20 | 21 | 19 | 15 | 16 | 19 | 23 | 16 | 15 | 16 | 19 | 9 | 9 | 16 |
| 18 | (Italy) Lorenzo Macoritto | Fantic | Junior 1 | 12 | 5 | Ret | DNS | | | | | | | | | | | 15 |
| 19 | (Finland) Peetu Juupaluoma | Husqvarna | Junior 1 | 21 | 22 | 17 | 16 | 22 | 14 | 20 | 13 | 14 | 13 | 21 | 16 | 19 | 12 | 14 |
| 20 | (Finland) Hermanni Haljala | TM | Junior 1 | 19 | 17 | 14 | 13 | 14 | 13 | 15 | 14 | 15 | DNS | | | | | 14 |
| 21 | (Spain) Enric Francisco | KTM | Junior 2 | 13 | 11 | 11 | Ret | | | | | | | | | | | 13 |
| 22 | (New Zealand) Tom Buxton | Husqvarna | Junior 2 | | | | | 18 | 18 | 24 | 24 | 21 | 20 | 17 | 20 | 12 | 10 | 10 |
| 23 | (Germany) Jeremy Sydow | Sherco | Junior 1 | | | | | | | | | | | | | 17 | 13 | 3 |
| 24 | (Sweden) Max Erlandsson | Honda | Junior 1 | 23 | 21 | 22 | 17 | 24 | 22 | Ret | 20 | Ret | 18 | 20 | 18 | | | 3 |
| 24 | (Sweden) Max Erlandsson | Honda | Junior 2 | | | | | | | | | | | | | 15 | 14 | 3 |
| 25 | (Spain) Adrià Sánchez | KTM | Junior 1 | 20 | Ret | 19 | 15 | 20 | 20 | 22 | 16 | 20 | 17 | 19 | 21 | Ret | 15 | 2 |
| Pos | Rider | Bike | Class | ESP (Spain) | | POR (Portugal) | | ITA (Italy) | | POR (Portugal) | | SVK (Slovakia) | | HUN (Hungary) | | GER (Germany) | | Points |

=== Junior 1 ===
Junior 1 is for motorcycles up to and including 250cc, both 2-stroke and 4-stroke.

| Team | Constructor | No | Rider | Rounds |
|---|---|---|---|---|
| Honda RedMoto World Enduro Team | Honda | 19 | (Finland) Roni Kytönen | All |
| Team Motokrosovaskola | Husqvarna | 23 | (Czech Republic) Zdeněk Pitel | 3, 6–7 |
| Husqvarna Motorcycles Spain | Husqvarna | 27 | (Spain) Sergio Navarro | 1–2, 5–7 |
| Sherco Czech Republic | Sherco | 31 | (Czech Republic) Matyáš Chlum | 3, 5 |
| KTM Team Pro Racing Sport | KTM | 38 | (Italy) Manolo Morettini | 1–6 |
| Fantic D'Arpa Racing Team | Fantic | 47 | (United Kingdom) Jed Etchells | All |
| Kytönen Motorsport | Husqvarna | 52 | (Finland) Peetu Juupaluoma | All |
| TM Boano Factory Team | TM | 58 | (Finland) Hermanni Haljala | 1–5 |
| Sherco Academy Deutschland | Sherco | 62 | (Germany) Luca Fischeder | All |
| Sherco Academy Deutschland | Sherco | 204 | (Germany) Jeremy Sydow | 7 |
| Fantic Factory Racing E50 Team | Fantic | 67 | (Spain) Marti Escofet | 1–2 |
| Fantic Factory Racing E50 Team | Fantic | 95 | (Italy) Lorenzo Macoritto | 1–2 |
| Yamaha Johansson MPE | Yamaha | 72 | (Sweden) Lucas Vågberg | 7 |
| CEC Racing | Gas Gas | 82 | (Sweden) Arvid Karlsson | 7 |
| WP Eric Augé KTM | KTM | 92 | (Spain) Adrià Sánchez | All |
| WP Eric Augé KTM | KTM | 151 | (Argentina) Carlo Bellone | 1–3 |
| WP Eric Augé KTM | KTM | 174 | (Spain) Adria Mesas | 1 |
| Sherco Factory Racing | Sherco | 101 | (France) Zach Pichon | All |
| RFME Enduro Junior Team | Beta | 111 | (Spain) Alejandro Navarro | All |
| JWR Honda Racing | Honda | 114 | (Sweden) Max Erlandsson | 1–6 |
| Anca Vigo/SBike Vigo/Single Track Galicia | KTM | 117 | (Spain) Pedro Gonzalo | 1 |
| WPM KTM Team | KTM | 124 | (Netherlands) Tommie Jochems | 5–6 |
| Lunigiana Honda RedMoto Team | Honda | 166 | (Italy) Claudio Spanu | All |
| Beta Portugal Moto Espinha | Beta | 170 | (Portugal) Renato Silva | 1–4 |
| JET Zanardo Racing Team | Husqvarna | 189 | (Chile) Jeremias Schiele | All |
| Sherco Academy France | Sherco | 214 | (France) Florian Furtado | 2 |
| GTG Motogamma | Gas Gas | 233 | (Italy) Simone Cristini | 3 |
| Solarys Racing | Husqvarna | 236 | (Italy) Filippo Colarusso | 3 |
| Enduro Team Poland M. Wrobel | KTM | 244 | (Poland) Dawid Babicz | 5 |
| KTM Sturm Zschopau | KTM | 255 | (Germany) Domenik Nieschalk | 7 |
| | Yamaha | 282 | (Sweden) Kalle Hindström | 7 |
| Sissi Racing | Gas Gas | 294 | (Italy) Riccardo Fabris | 7 |

=== Riders Championship ===
| Pos | Rider | Bike | ESP (Spain) | | POR (Portugal) | | ITA (Italy) | | POR (Portugal) | | SVK (Slovakia) | | HUN (Hungary) | | GER (Germany) | | Points |
|---|---|---|---|---|---|---|---|---|---|---|---|---|---|---|---|---|---|
| 1 | (France) Zach Pichon | Sherco | 1 | 1 | 1 | 1 | 1 | 1 | 1 | 2 | 2 | 2 | 1 | 1 | 1 | 1 | 271 |
| 2 | (Finland) Roni Kytönen | Honda | 2 | 2 | 3 | 6 | 2 | 2 | 2 | 1 | 3 | 1 | 2 | 2 | 2 | 2 | 233 |
| 3 | (United Kingdom) Jed Etchells | Fantic | 3 | 3 | 2 | 2 | 3 | 3 | 4 | 4 | 4 | 4 | 7 | 4 | 3 | Ret | 183 |
| 4 | (Italy) Claudio Spanu | Honda | 7 | 7 | 4 | 5 | 5 | 4 | 6 | 6 | 5 | 5 | 4 | 5 | 7 | 3 | 156 |
| 5 | (Germany) Luca Fischeder | Sherco | 5 | 6 | 6 | 3 | 4 | 6 | 5 | 3 | 1 | 3 | 8 | 6 | Ret | Ret | 148 |
| 6 | (Spain) Alejandro Navarro | Beta | 8 | 8 | 5 | 4 | 6 | 5 | 7 | 5 | 7 | 6 | 5 | 8 | 5 | 7 | 139 |
| 7 | (Finland) Peetu Juupaluoma | Husqvarna | 12 | 12 | 8 | 10 | 11 | 9 | 10 | 8 | 8 | 7 | 12 | 9 | 8 | 4 | 97 |
| 8 | (Italy) Manolo Morettini | KTM | 9 | 10 | 9 | 8 | 8 | 7 | 3 | 7 | 10 | Ret | 6 | 7 | | | 94 |
| 9 | (Spain) Adrià Sánchez | KTM | 11 | Ret | 10 | 9 | 10 | 12 | 11 | 10 | 11 | 8 | 10 | 11 | Ret | 6 | 73 |
| 10 | (Finland) Hermanni Haljala | TM | 10 | 9 | 7 | 7 | 7 | 8 | 8 | 9 | 9 | DNS | | | | | 70 |
| 11 | (Spain) Sergio Navarro | Husqvarna | 4 | 4 | Ret | DNS | | | | | 6 | Ret | 3 | 3 | Ret | DNS | 66 |
| 12 | (Chile) Jeremias Schiele | Husqvarna | Ret | DNS | 13 | 12 | 14 | 14 | 9 | 13 | 12 | 10 | 9 | 12 | 11 | 10 | 53 |
| 13 | (Sweden) Max Erlandsson | Honda | 13 | 11 | 12 | 11 | 13 | 13 | Ret | 11 | Ret | 9 | 11 | 10 | | | 46 |
| 14 | (Germany) Jeremy Sydow | Sherco | | | | | | | | | | | | | 6 | 5 | 21 |
| 15 | (Italy) Lorenzo Macoritto | Fantic | 6 | 5 | Ret | DNS | | | | | | | | | | | 21 |
| 16 | (Czech Republic) Zdeněk Pitel | Husqvarna | | | | | 15 | 15 | | | | | 13 | 13 | 10 | 9 | 21 |
| 17 | (Portugal) Renato Silva | Beta | 14 | 13 | 11 | Ret | 16 | 16 | 12 | 12 | | | | | | | 18 |
| 18 | (Italy) Riccardo Fabris | Gas Gas | | | | | | | | | | | | | 9 | 8 | 15 |
| 19 | (Sweden) Lucas Vågberg | Yamaha | | | | | | | | | | | | | 4 | Ret | 13 |
| 20 | (Italy) Simone Cristini | Gas Gas | | | | | 9 | 11 | | | | | | | | | 12 |
| 21 | (Czech Republic) Matyáš Chlum | Sherco | | | | | 12 | 10 | | | Ret | DNS | | | | | 10 |
| 22 | (Sweden) Arvid Karlsson | Gas Gas | | | | | | | | | | | | | 13 | 11 | 8 |
| 23 | (Netherlands) Tommie Jochems | KTM | | | | | | | | | 14 | DNS | 14 | 14 | | | 6 |
| 24 | (Argentina) Carlo Bellone | KTM | 16 | 15 | 15 | 13 | 18 | 17 | | | | | | | | | 5 |
| 25 | (Germany) Domenik Nieschalk | KTM | | | | | | | | | | | | | 12 | Ret | 4 |
| 26 | (Poland) Dawid Babicz | KTM | | | | | | | | | 13 | Ret | | | | | 3 |
| 27 | (Spain) Pedro Gonzalo | KTM | 15 | 14 | | | | | | | | | | | | | 3 |
| 28 | (France) Florian Furtado | Sherco | | | 14 | Ret | | | | | | | | | | | 2 |
| | (Spain) Marti Escofet | Fantic | 17 | Ret | Ret | DNS | | | | | | | | | | | 0 |
| | (Italy) Filippo Colarusso | Husqvarna | | | | | 17 | Ret | | | | | | | | | 0 |
| | (Spain) Adria Mesas | KTM | Ret | DNS | | | | | | | | | | | | | 0 |
| | (Sweden) Kalle Hindström | Yamaha | | | | | | | | | | | | | Ret | DNS | 0 |
| Pos | Rider | Bike | ESP (Spain) | | POR (Portugal) | | ITA (Italy) | | POR (Portugal) | | SVK (Slovakia) | | HUN (Hungary) | | GER (Germany) | | Points |

=== Junior 2 ===
Junior 2 is for motorcycles over 255cc, both 2-stroke and 4-stroke.

| Team | Constructor | No | Rider | Rounds |
|---|---|---|---|---|
| JET Zanardo Racing Team | Husqvarna | 14 | (New Zealand) Tom Buxton | 3–7 |
| WP Eric Augé KTM | KTM | 21 | (Spain) Enric Francisco | 1–2 |
| WP Eric Augé KTM | KTM | 66 | (Argentina) Cristobal Sola | 3–4 |
| WP Eric Augé KTM | KTM | 107 | (Argentina) Luciano Robledo | 1–2, 7 |
| Sherco Factory Racing | Sherco | 41 | (Italy) Morgan Lesiardo | All |
| Team Beta Oxmoto | Beta | 49 | (France) Luc Fargier | All |
| KTM Scandinavia | KTM | 54 | (Sweden) Axel Semb | 3–7 |
| Atomic Moto | Beta | 64 | (France) Killian Irigoyen | 1–6 |
| Yamaha Johansson MPE | Yamaha | 72 | (Sweden) Lucas Vågberg | 1–4 |
| RFME Enduro Junior Team | Gas Gas | 86 | (Spain) Bernat Cortés | All |
| Fantic D'Arpa Racing Team | Fantic | 97 | (Sweden) Albin Norrbin | All |
| JWR Honda Racing | Honda | 114 | (Sweden) Max Erlandsson | 7 |
| Team Sturm Zschopau | KTM | 116 | (Germany) Karl Weigelt | 7 |
| Team Sturm Zschopau | KTM | 285 | (Germany) Florian Görner | 7 |
| EasyMotos Gas Gas Portugal | Gas Gas | 135 | (Portugal) Bruno Charrua | 1–2 |
| GTG Motogamma | Gas Gas | 144 | (Italy) Enrico Rinaldi | All |
| KBS Team | Beta | 152 | (Czech Republic) Matěj Škuta | All |
| André Motors | Gas Gas | 156 | (Netherlands) Kaiya Brouwer | 1–3 |
| Beta Entrophy Junior Team | Beta | 177 | (Sweden) Max Ahlin | All |
| RAW Motorsports Xcentric TM | TM | 201 | (France) Mathis Juillard | 7 |
| Motoclub Regnano | KTM | 224 | (Italy) Mirko Ciani | 3 |
| Osellini Moto | Husqvarna | 235 | (Italy) Yuri Quarti | 3 |
| | Sherco | 238 | (Czech Republic) Jaroslav Kalna | 3, 6–7 |
| Brouwer Motors Jumbo Gas Gas | Gas Gas | 242 | (Netherlands) Mike Bokslag | 5–6 |
| OSK Racing Team | Beta | 281 | (Germany) Hannes Lehmann | 7 |
| | Gas Gas | 288 | (Japan) Yoshikazu Hosaka | 7 |
| Aub Moto Beta Racing | Beta | 289 | (France) Thomas Zoldos | 7 |
| Team Sherco Sweden | Sherco | 290 | (Sweden) Nisse Bengtsson | 7 |
| Baur Gruppe/Vollgas Offroad | Sherco | 291 | (Germany) Milan Schmüser | 7 |

=== Riders Championship ===
| Pos | Rider | Bike | ESP (Spain) | | POR (Portugal) | | ITA (Italy) | | POR (Portugal) | | SVK (Slovakia) | | HUN (Hungary) | | GER (Germany) | | Points |
|---|---|---|---|---|---|---|---|---|---|---|---|---|---|---|---|---|---|
| 1 | (France) Luc Fargier | Beta | 1 | 1 | 1 | 1 | 1 | 1 | 1 | 1 | 2 | 2 | 3 | 2 | 4 | 2 | 256 |
| 2 | (Sweden) Max Ahlin | Beta | 2 | 5 | 6 | 2 | 2 | 2 | 2 | 2 | 1 | 1 | 2 | 3 | 2 | 4 | 225 |
| 3 | (Sweden) Albin Norrbin | Fantic | 5 | 4 | 8 | 6 | 4 | 4 | 6 | 4 | 4 | 4 | 1 | 1 | 1 | 1 | 197 |
| 4 | (Spain) Bernat Cortés | Gas Gas | 6 | 8 | 3 | Ret | 6 | 3 | 4 | 3 | 3 | 3 | 4 | 5 | 3 | 3 | 170 |
| 5 | (Italy) Enrico Rinaldi | Gas Gas | 8 | 7 | 4 | 5 | 3 | 5 | 3 | 5 | 6 | 7 | 7 | 4 | 7 | 5 | 154 |
| 6 | (Italy) Morgan Lesiardo | Sherco | 4 | 2 | 7 | 3 | 7 | 11 | 5 | Ret | 5 | 6 | 6 | 7 | 9 | 6 | 136 |
| 7 | (Czech Republic) Matěj Škuta | Beta | 10 | 10 | 10 | 7 | 8 | 7 | 10 | 10 | 7 | 8 | 8 | 9 | 6 | 7 | 107 |
| 8 | (Sweden) Axel Semb | KTM | | | | | 11 | 6 | 7 | 6 | 9 | 5 | 5 | 6 | 5 | 11 | 89 |
| 9 | (Sweden) Lucas Vågberg | Yamaha | 3 | 3 | 2 | 4 | 5 | Ret | 9 | 8 | | | | | | | 86 |
| 10 | (France) Killian Irigoyen | Beta | 9 | 9 | 9 | Ret | 10 | 9 | 8 | 9 | 8 | 9 | Ret | 8 | | | 72 |
| 11 | (New Zealand) Tom Buxton | Husqvarna | | | | | 9 | 8 | 12 | 11 | 10 | 10 | 9 | 10 | 8 | 8 | 65 |
| 12 | (Spain) Enric Francisco | KTM | 7 | 6 | 5 | Ret | | | | | | | | | | | 30 |
| 13 | (Czech Republic) Jaroslav Kalny | Sherco | | | | | 13 | 13 | | | | | 10 | 11 | 12 | 10 | 27 |
| 14 | (Argentina) Luciano Robledo | KTM | 12 | 11 | 12 | 8 | | | | | | | | | 14 | 13 | 26 |
| 15 | (Netherlands) Kaiya Brouwer | Gas Gas | 11 | 12 | 11 | 10 | 15 | Ret | | | | | | | | | 21 |
| 16 | (Netherlands) Mike Bokslag | Gas Gas | | | | | | | | | 11 | 11 | 11 | 12 | | | 19 |
| 17 | (Argentina) Cristobal Sola | KTM | | | | | 12 | Ret | 11 | 7 | | | | | | | 18 |
| 18 | (Portugal) Bruno Charrua | Gas Gas | 13 | 13 | 13 | 9 | | | | | | | | | | | 16 |
| 19 | (Sweden) Max Erlandsson | Honda | | | | | | | | | | | | | 10 | 9 | 13 |
| 20 | (France) Mathis Juillard | TM | | | | | | | | | | | | | 11 | 12 | 9 |
| 21 | (Italy) Yuri Quarti | Husqvarna | | | | | 16 | 10 | | | | | | | | | 6 |
| 22 | (Italy) Mirko Ciani | KTM | | | | | 14 | 12 | | | | | | | | | 6 |
| 23 | (Germany) Milan Schmüser | Sherco | | | | | | | | | | | | | 13 | Ret | 3 |
| 24 | (Germany) Hannes Lehmann | Beta | | | | | | | | | | | | | 17 | 14 | 2 |
| 25 | (Sweden) Nisse Bengtsson | Sherco | | | | | | | | | | | | | 16 | 15 | 1 |
| 26 | (Germany) Karl Weigelt | KTM | | | | | | | | | | | | | 15 | 16 | 1 |
| | (Japan) Yoshikazu Hosaka | Gas Gas | | | | | | | | | | | | | Ret | 17 | 0 |
| | (Germany) Florian Görner | KTM | | | | | | | | | | | | | Ret | DNS | 0 |
| | (France) Thomas Zoldos | Beta | | | | | | | | | | | | | Ret | DNS | 0 |
| Pos | Rider | Bike | ESP (Spain) | | POR (Portugal) | | ITA (Italy) | | POR (Portugal) | | SVK (Slovakia) | | HUN (Hungary) | | GER (Germany) | | Points |

== Youth ==
All riders competing in the Youth world championship must be younger than 21 years of age on 1 January of the year of the championship.

Only 2-stroke motorcycles between 100cc-125cc can be used.

| Team | Constructor | No | Rider | Rounds |
|---|---|---|---|---|
| | Fantic | 29 | (France) Jules Rey | 5, 7 |
| GTG Motogamma | Gas Gas | 33 | (Italy) Daniele Delbono | 1–2, 7 |
| Fantic Factory Racing E50 Team | Fantic | 34 | (Italy) Valentino Corsi | 3, 7 |
| Fantic Factory Racing E50 Team | Fantic | 37 | (Italy) Kevin Cristino | All |
| Fantic Factory Racing E50 Team | Fantic | 67 | (Spain) Marti Escofet | 5–6 |
| ET James/SBXtreme Gas Gas | Gas Gas | 42 | (United Kingdom) Samuel Davies | All |
| TM Boano Factory Team | TM | 53 | (Finland) Samuli Puhakainen | All |
| RFME Enduro Junior Team | KTM | 59 | (Spain) Lluis Gonfaus | 1–3, 5–7 |
| RFME Enduro Junior Team | KTM | 78 | (Spain) Albert Fontova | All |
| Fantic D'Arpa Racing Team | Fantic | 63 | (Finland) Pyry Juupaluoma | All |
| Yamaha Johansson MPE | Yamaha | 65 | (Sweden) Arvid Modin | All |
| Fantic JET Racing Team | Fantic | 68 | (United Kingdom) Harry Edmondson | All |
| Fantic JET Racing Team | Fantic | 87 | (Norway) Herman Ask | 1–3, 5–7 |
| Fantic JET Racing Team | Fantic | 164 | (Spain) Oriol Roca | All |
| Fantic Portugal | Fantic | 73 | (Portugal) Frederico Rocha | 1–4 |
| Beta Entrophy Junior Team | Beta | 80 | (Italy) Davide Mei | 3, 6–7 |
| Beta Entrophy Junior Team | Beta | 119 | (Italy) Lorenzo Bernini | All |
| | Beta | 84 | (Finland) Juho Ahokas | 3–4, 7 |
| Atomic Moto | Beta | 102 | (France) Leo Joyon | 1–5 |
| WP Eric Augé KTM | KTM | 104 | (Spain) Alex Puey | All |
| WP Eric Augé KTM | KTM | 132 | (Venezuela) Manuel Fumero | 1–4, 6–7 |
| Sherco Academy France | Sherco | 105 | (France) Thibault Giraudon | All |
| Team Momento TT Motos | KTM | 115 | (Portugal) André Reis | 2 |
| Team Momento TT Motos | Gas Gas | 191 | (Portugal) Fábio Costa | 2 |
| Osellini Moto | Husqvarna | 120 | (Sweden) Sebastian Olsen | All |
| Osellini Moto | Husqvarna | 146 | (Sweden) Kalle Ahlin | All |
| Osellini Moto | Husqvarna | 239 | (Italy) Luca Colorio | 3 |
| Yamaha Offroad Experience | Yamaha | 127 | (United Kingdom) Charlie Chater | 1–2, 6–7 |
| Kytönen Motorsport | Husqvarna | 202 | (Finland) Niko Puotsaari | 3–6 |
| | Husqvarna | 215 | (France) Mathias Dolci | 2 |
| | Gas Gas | 234 | (Italy) Matteo Grigis | 3 |
| | KTM | 237 | (Italy) Nicola Grossi | 3 |
| FR Motosport | Beta | 240 | (Italy) Federico Magri | 3 |
| | Fantic | 241 | (Italy) Pietro Scardina | 3 |
| CEC Racing | Husqvarna | 284 | (Sweden) Linus Lamberg | 7 |
| Pro Circuit Team Sweden | KTM | 287 | (Sweden) Oliver Önnefors | 7 |

=== Riders Championship ===
| Pos | Rider | Bike | ESP (Spain) | | POR (Portugal) | | ITA (Italy) | | POR (Portugal) | | SVK (Slovakia) | | HUN (Hungary) | | GER (Germany) | | Points |
|---|---|---|---|---|---|---|---|---|---|---|---|---|---|---|---|---|---|
| 1 | (United Kingdom) Harry Edmondson | Fantic | 1 | 2 | 2 | 2 | 1 | 2 | 1 | 1 | 2 | 2 | 4 | 3 | 3 | 4 | 238 |
| 2 | (Italy) Kevin Cristino | Fantic | Ret | 1 | 1 | 3 | 2 | 3 | 2 | 2 | 4 | 1 | 2 | 1 | 1 | 2 | 228 |
| 3 | (France) Thibault Giraudon | Sherco | 3 | Ret | 3 | 4 | Ret | 1 | 4 | 5 | 3 | 4 | 1 | 4 | 2 | 1 | 185 |
| 4 | (Finland) Samuli Puhakainen | TM | 2 | 3 | 9 | 1 | 3 | Ret | 3 | 4 | 1 | Ret | 3 | 2 | 4 | 3 | 182 |
| 5 | (Spain) Albert Fontova | KTM | 4 | 4 | 5 | 8 | 5 | 6 | 7 | 6 | 6 | 3 | 5 | Ret | 6 | 5 | 142 |
| 6 | (United Kingdom) Samuel Davies | Gas Gas | 10 | 8 | 6 | 6 | 6 | 7 | 12 | 9 | 9 | 8 | 6 | 5 | 5 | 9 | 118 |
| 7 | (Finland) Pyry Juupaluoma | Fantic | 7 | 7 | Ret | DNS | 7 | 5 | 6 | 7 | 8 | 6 | 9 | 7 | 9 | 7 | 107 |
| 8 | (France) Leo Joyon | Beta | 5 | 6 | 4 | 5 | 4 | 4 | 5 | 3 | Ret | DNS | | | | | 97 |
| 9 | (Sweden) Arvid Modin | Yamaha | 8 | 9 | 8 | Ret | 12 | 11 | 8 | 8 | 10 | 9 | 8 | Ret | 8 | 6 | 87 |
| 10 | (Spain) Alex Puey | KTM | 9 | Ret | 7 | 11 | 14 | 13 | 10 | 12 | 7 | 5 | 10 | 8 | 11 | 11 | 80 |
| 11 | (Italy) Lorenzo Bernini | Beta | Ret | DNS | Ret | DNS | 8 | 10 | 9 | 10 | 5 | 7 | 7 | Ret | 20 | 8 | 64 |
| 12 | (Spain) Lluis Gonfaus | KTM | 11 | 11 | 11 | 10 | 11 | Ret | | | 12 | 10 | 14 | 11 | 15 | 14 | 46 |
| 13 | (Italy) Daniele Delbono | Gas Gas | 6 | 5 | Ret | 7 | | | | | | | | | 7 | 12 | 43 |
| 14 | (United Kingdom) Charlie Chater | Yamaha | 12 | 10 | 10 | 9 | | | | | | | 12 | 6 | 14 | 18 | 39 |
| 15 | (Sweden) Kalle Ahlin | Husqvarna | 15 | 12 | 15 | 15 | Ret | 20 | 17 | 15 | 13 | 12 | 13 | 12 | 13 | 16 | 25 |
| 16 | (Italy) Valentino Corsi | Fantic | | | | | 16 | 8 | | | | | | | 10 | 10 | 20 |
| 17 | (Venezuela) Manuel Fumero | KTM | 14 | 13 | 16 | 16 | 21 | 19 | 13 | 11 | | | Ret | 16 | 12 | 13 | 20 |
| 18 | (Italy) Matteo Grigis | Gas Gas | | | | | 9 | 9 | | | | | | | | | 14 |
| 19 | (Italy) Davide Mei | Beta | | | | | 15 | 15 | | | | | 11 | 9 | 16 | Ret | 14 |
| 20 | (Finland) Niko Puotsaari | Husqvarna | | | | | 19 | 21 | 14 | 16 | 11 | Ret | 15 | 10 | | | 14 |
| 21 | (Portugal) Frederico Rocha | Fantic | 13 | 16 | 14 | 12 | 18 | 16 | 11 | Ret | | | | | | | 14 |
| 22 | (Spain) Oriol Roca | Fantic | 16 | 14 | 12 | 13 | 20 | 17 | Ret | Ret | 16 | 13 | Ret | 14 | 21 | Ret | 14 |
| 23 | (Norway) Herman Ask | Fantic | 17 | 15 | 13 | 14 | 23 | Ret | | | 14 | 16 | 17 | 15 | 19 | 15 | 10 |
| 24 | (Italy) Pietro Scardina | Fantic | | | | | 10 | 14 | | | | | | | | | 8 |
| 25 | (Sweden) Sebastian Olsen | Husqvarna | 18 | 17 | 18 | 17 | 22 | 22 | 16 | 14 | 15 | 14 | 16 | 13 | 17 | 17 | 8 |
| 26 | (Italy) Luca Colorio | Husqvarna | | | | | 13 | 12 | | | | | | | | | 7 |
| 27 | (France) Jules Rey | Fantic | | | | | | | | | Ret | 11 | | | 18 | 19 | 5 |
| 28 | (Finland) Juho Ahokas | Beta | | | | | 17 | 18 | 15 | 13 | | | | | Ret | DNS | 4 |
| 29 | (Spain) Marti Escofet | Fantic | | | | | | | | | Ret | 15 | 18 | Ret | | | 1 |
| | (Portugal) Fábio Costa | Gas Gas | | | 17 | Ret | | | | | | | | | | | 0 |
| | (Portugal) André Reis | KTM | | | 20 | 18 | | | | | | | | | | | 0 |
| | (France) Mathias Dolci | Husqvarna | | | 19 | DNS | | | | | | | | | | | 0 |
| | (Sweden) Oliver Önnefors | KTM | | | | | | | | | | | | | Ret | 20 | 0 |
| | (Italy) Federico Magri | Beta | | | | | 24 | Ret | | | | | | | | | 0 |
| | (Italy) Nicola Grossi | KTM | | | | | Ret | Ret | | | | | | | | | 0 |
| | (Sweden) Linus Lamberg | Husqvarna | | | | | | | | | | | | | Ret | Ret | 0 |
| Pos | Rider | Bike | ESP (Spain) | | POR (Portugal) | | ITA (Italy) | | POR (Portugal) | | SVK (Slovakia) | | HUN (Hungary) | | GER (Germany) | | Points |

== Women ==
Competitors in the Women's world championship can compete on any capacity of motorcycle of their choosing.

| Team | Constructor | No | Rider | Rounds |
|---|---|---|---|---|
| Beta Scandinavia Racing | Beta | 401 | (Sweden) Linnéa Åkesson | 4 |
| | Beta | 412 | (Slovenia) Tjaša Fifer | 1, 4 |
| CEC Racing | KTM | 414 | (Sweden) Emelie Nilsson | 1–2, 4 |
| Edge Offroad | KTM | 416 | (United Kingdom) Rosie Rowett | All |
| Gas Gas CAP Motos | Gas Gas | 417 | (France) Mauricette Brisebard | All |
| Sherco Academy France | Sherco | 420 | (France) Elodie Chaplot | All |
| WPM Motors | Gas Gas | 422 | (Norway) Vilde Holt | All |
| Honda RedMoto World Enduro Team | Honda | 427 | (Italy) Francesca Nocera | 1, 4 |
| RFME Enduro Junior Team | Rieju | 432 | (Spain) Mireia Badia | All |
| | KTM | 437 | (France) Audrey Rossat | All |
| Husqvarna España | Husqvarna | 441 | (Spain) Mireia Rabionet | 4 |
| JET Zanardo Racing Team | Fantic | 442 | (Argentina) Carla Scaglioni | 1–3 |
| OSK Racing Team | Beta | 455 | (Germany) Tanja Schlosser | 4 |
| Raposeira Yamaha Portugal | Yamaha | 461 | (Portugal) Rita Vieira | All |
| Gas Gas Portugal | Gas Gas | 467 | (Portugal) Bruna Antunes | 1–2 |
| | Gas Gas | 477 | (Japan) Harumi Ota | 4 |
| | Fantic | 486 | (Chile) Tania Gonzalez | 1–2 |
| Elite Moto 15 Enduro Team | KTM | 495 | (France) Justine Martel | 1, 4 |
| Fantic JET Racing Team | Fantic | 496 | (United Kingdom) Jane Daniels | All |

=== Riders Championship ===
| Pos | Rider | Bike | ESP (Spain) | | POR (Portugal) | | POR (Portugal) | | GER (Germany) | | Points |
|---|---|---|---|---|---|---|---|---|---|---|---|
| 1 | (United Kingdom) Jane Daniels | Fantic | 1 | 1 | 1 | 1 | 1 | 1 | 1 | 1 | 160 |
| 2 | (Spain) Mireia Badia | Rieju | 2 | 2 | 2 | 2 | 2 | 2 | 3 | 2 | 134 |
| 3 | (United Kingdom) Rosie Rowett | KTM | 3 | 5 | 4 | 4 | 3 | 3 | 2 | 3 | 114 |
| 4 | (Portugal) Rita Vieira | Yamaha | 4 | 3 | 3 | 3 | 5 | 4 | 4 | 4 | 108 |
| 5 | (France) Elodie Chaplot | Sherco | 6 | 6 | 5 | 5 | 4 | 6 | 5 | Ret | 76 |
| 6 | (France) Mauricette Brisebard | Gas Gas | 11 | 8 | 10 | 6 | 6 | 7 | 9 | 9 | 62 |
| 7 | (Norway) Vilde Holt | Gas Gas | 5 | 4 | 7 | 9 | 8 | 5 | Ret | DNS | 59 |
| 8 | (France) Audrey Rossat | KTM | 13 | 11 | 9 | 8 | 7 | 8 | 12 | DNS | 44 |
| 9 | (Sweden) Emelie Nilsson | KTM | 10 | 9 | 8 | 7 | | | 11 | 10 | 41 |
| 10 | (Portugal) Bruna Antunes | Gas Gas | 8 | 7 | 6 | Ret | | | | | 27 |
| 11 | (Italy) Francesca Nocera | Honda | 7 | DNS | | | | | 10 | 5 | 26 |
| 12 | (France) Justine Martel | KTM | Ret | DNS | | | | | 6 | 6 | 20 |
| 13 | (Slovenia) Tjaša Fifer | Beta | 12 | DNS | | | | | 8 | 8 | 20 |
| 14 | (Germany) Tanja Schlosser | Beta | | | | | | | 7 | 7 | 18 |
| 15 | (Argentina) Carla Scaglioni | Fantic | Ret | 12 | Ret | Ret | 9 | 9 | | | 18 |
| 16 | (Chile) Tania Gonzalez | Fantic | 9 | 10 | Ret | DNS | | | | | 13 |
| | (Japan) Harumi Ota | Gas Gas | | | | | | | Ret | Ret | 0 |
| | (Sweden) Linnéa Åkesson | Beta | | | | | | | Ret | DNS | 0 |
| | (Spain) Mireia Rabionet | Husqvarna | | | | | | | Ret | DNS | 0 |
| Pos | Rider | Bike | ESP (Spain) | | POR (Portugal) | | POR (Portugal) | | GER (Germany) | | Points |

== Open World Cup ==
=== Open 2-Stroke ===
Open 2-Stroke is for 2-stroke motorcycles of any engine capacity.

| Team | Constructor | No | Rider | Rounds |
|---|---|---|---|---|
| | KTM | 501 | (France) Arnaud Blondel | 2 |
| | Beta | 502 | (United Kingdom) Alun Jones | 7 |
| Enduro Echt Gold Team | Gas Gas | 503 | (Czech Republic) Robert Friedrich | 1–3, 5–7 |
| Bombe Racing | Beta | 506 | (Germany) Samantha Buhmann | 7 |
| | Beta | 508 | (Germany) Matthias Albrecht | 7 |
| Air Moto Sherco | Sherco | 509 | (Slovakia) Jaroslav Duboczi | 5 |
| Bull Bikes Modena Off Road | KTM | 510 | (Italy) Michael Galletti | 3 |
| | Gas Gas | 511 | (Poland) Adam Tomiczek | 5 |
| | Sherco | 512 | (Czech Republic) Jiri Hadek | 5–7 |
| | KTM | 513 | (Germany) Marcel Richter | 7 |
| | Sherco | 515 | (Austria) Florian Salbrechter | 7 |
| OSK Racing Team | Beta | 518 | (Germany) Patrick Irmscher | 3, 7 |
| OSK Racing Team | Beta | 522 | (Germany) Paul Diederich | 3 |
| | Husqvarna | 519 | (Italy) Riccardo Chiappa | 3 |
| MH Motorraeder GmbH | Gas Gas | 520 | (Germany) Felix Bopp | 7 |
| | Sherco | 521 | (Italy) Alessandro Mercadanti | 3 |
| Osellini Moto | Husqvarna | 524 | (Italy) Stefano Nigelli | 3 |
| Pikbau/Synthesa Gruppe | KTM | 525 | (Austria) Daniel Moser | 1–3 |
| Pikbau/Synthesa Gruppe | KTM | 591 | (Austria) Luca Seppele | 1–3, 5–6 |
| Beta UK | Beta | 528 | (United Kingdom) Harry Houghton | 1–4 |
| Beta UK | Beta | 533 | (United Kingdom) Alfie Webb | 7 |
| | KTM | 529 | (Italy) Mirco Attorni | 3 |
| Factory Team Walzer | KTM | 530 | (Austria) Marcel Schnölzer | 3, 5 |
| JET Zanardo Racing Team | Husqvarna | 531 | (Chile) Luciano Collantes | All |
| Team Motokrosová Škola | Husqvarna | 532 | (Czech Republic) Jakub Hedrlín | 7 |
| | TM | 539 | (Italy) Roberto Rota | 3–7 |
| Motorex Husqvarna Switzerland | Husqvarna | 540 | (Switzerland) Steve Erzer | 3, 7 |
| | Husqvarna | 543 | (Italy) Claudio Nassetti | 3 |
| | KTM | 544 | (Spain) Esteve Serarols | 1 |
| WPM KTM Team | KTM | 544 | (Australia) Scott Noble | 5–6 |
| Rieju Motorcycles | Rieju | 548 | (Spain) Jan Olivera | 1–4, 7 |
| Enduro Team Poland M. Wrobel | Beta | 550 | (Poland) Aleksander Bracik | 5 |
| Team Sturm Zschopau | KTM | 568 | (Germany) Falk Umbreit | 7 |
| | Fantic | 569 | (Italy) Jacopo Rampoldi | 3 |
| AMK Hamry | KTM | 572 | (Czech Republic) Oldřich Sedlák | 1–2, 4–5, 7 |
| Cocconcelli Moto KTM | KTM | 584 | (Italy) Stefano Giacobini | 3 |
| | Sherco | 585 | (Spain) Ignacio Rodríguez | 1 |
| | KTM | 590 | (Lithuania) Donatas Petrikas | 5 |
| | Sherco | 599 | (Hungary) Daniel Tadics | 5–6 |

=== Riders Championship ===
| Pos | Rider | Bike | ESP (Spain) | | POR (Portugal) | | ITA (Italy) | | POR (Portugal) | | SVK (Slovakia) | | HUN (Hungary) | | GER (Germany) | | Points |
|---|---|---|---|---|---|---|---|---|---|---|---|---|---|---|---|---|---|
| 1 | (United Kingdom) Harry Houghton | Beta | 1 | 1 | 1 | 1 | 1 | 1 | 1 | 1 | | | | | | | 160 |
| 2 | (Czech Republic) Robert Friedrich | Gas Gas | 2 | 2 | 2 | 3 | 3 | 3 | | | 2 | 3 | 2 | 2 | 1 | 1 | 142 |
| 3 | (Italy) Roberto Rota | TM | | | | | 2 | 4 | 3 | 3 | 5 | 5 | 1 | 1 | 3 | 3 | 130 |
| 4 | (Spain) Jan Olivera | Rieju | 3 | 3 | 3 | 2 | 4 | 2 | 2 | 2 | | | | | 11 | DNS | 126 |
| 5 | (Chile) Luciano Collantes | Husqvarna | 6 | 4 | 4 | 4 | 9 | 10 | 4 | 4 | 8 | 7 | 5 | 5 | 12 | DNS | 97 |
| 6 | (Czech Republic) Jiri Hadek | Sherco | | | | | | | | | 3 | 2 | 3 | 3 | 2 | 2 | 96 |
| 7 | (Czech Republic) Oldřich Sedlák | KTM | 7 | 7 | 5 | 5 | | | 5 | 5 | 10 | 8 | | | 13 | 10 | 76 |
| 8 | (Austria) Luca Seppele | KTM | Ret | 9 | 8 | 8 | 13 | 14 | | | Ret | DNS | 7 | 7 | | | 46 |
| 9 | (Poland) Adam Tomiczek | Gas Gas | | | | | | | | | 1 | 1 | | | | | 40 |
| 10 | (Switzerland) Steve Erzer | Husqvarna | | | | | 5 | 7 | | | | | | | 7 | 7 | 38 |
| 11 | (Austria) Daniel Moser | KTM | 8 | 8 | 7 | 7 | 15 | DNS | | | | | | | | | 35 |
| 12 | (Austria) Marcel Schnölzer | KTM | | | | | 6 | 5 | | | 6 | Ret | | | | | 31 |
| 13 | (Australia) Scott Noble | KTM | | | | | | | | | 9 | Ret | 6 | 6 | | | 27 |
| 14 | (Hungary) Daniel Tadics | Sherco | | | | | | | | | Ret | DNS | 4 | 4 | | | 26 |
| 15 | (Poland) Aleksander Bracik | Beta | | | | | | | | | 4 | 4 | | | | | 26 |
| 16 | (Austria) Florian Salbrechter | Sherco | | | | | | | | | | | | | 5 | 4 | 26 |
| 17 | (Spain) Ignacio Rodriguez | Sherco | 4 | 5 | | | | | | | | | | | | | 24 |
| 18 | (United Kingdom) Alfie Webb | Beta | | | | | | | | | | | | | 6 | 5 | 21 |
| 19 | (Spain) Esteve Serarols | KTM | 5 | 6 | | | | | | | | | | | | | 21 |
| 20 | (France) Arnaud Blondel | KTM | | | 6 | 6 | | | | | | | | | | | 20 |
| 21 | (Slovakia) Jaroslav Duboczi | Sherco | | | | | | | | | 7 | 6 | | | | | 19 |
| 22 | (United Kingdom) Alun Jones | Beta | | | | | | | | | | | | | 8 | 6 | 18 |
| 23 | (Italy) Stefano Nigelli | Husqvarna | | | | | 8 | 6 | | | | | | | | | 18 |
| 24 | (Germany) Paul Diederich | Beta | | | | | 7 | 9 | | | | | | | | | 16 |
| 25 | (Germany) Felix Bopp | Gas Gas | | | | | | | | | | | | | 10 | 8 | 14 |
| 26 | (Italy) Riccardo Chiappa | Husqvarna | | | | | 10 | 8 | | | | | | | | | 14 |
| 27 | (Germany) Patrick Irmscher | Beta | | | | | Ret | DNS | | | | | | | 9 | 9 | 14 |
| 28 | (Czech Republic) Jakub Hedrlín | Husqvarna | | | | | | | | | | | | | 4 | Ret | 13 |
| 29 | (Italy) Alessandro Mercadanti | Sherco | | | | | 12 | 11 | | | | | | | | | 9 |
| 30 | (Italy) Stefano Giacobini | KTM | | | | | 11 | 12 | | | | | | | | | 9 |
| 31 | (Germany) Marcel Richter | KTM | | | | | | | | | | | | | 14 | 11 | 7 |
| 32 | (Germany) Matthias Albrecht | Beta | | | | | | | | | | | | | 15 | 12 | 5 |
| 33 | (Italy) Mirco Attorni | KTM | | | | | 14 | 13 | | | | | | | | | 5 |
| 34 | (Germany) Samantha Buhmann | Beta | | | | | | | | | | | | | 16 | 13 | 3 |
| | (Italy) Michael Galletti | KTM | | | | | Ret | Ret | | | | | | | | | 0 |
| | (Italy) Claudio Nassetti | Husqvarna | | | | | Ret | DNS | | | | | | | | | 0 |
| | (Italy) Jacopo Rampoldi | Fantic | | | | | Ret | DNS | | | | | | | | | 0 |
| | (Lithuania) Donatas Petrikas | KTM | | | | | | | | | Ret | DNS | | | | | 0 |
| | (Germany) Falk Umbreit | KTM | | | | | | | | | | | | | Ret | DNS | 0 |
| Pos | Rider | Bike | ESP (Spain) | | POR (Portugal) | | ITA (Italy) | | POR (Portugal) | | SVK (Slovakia) | | HUN (Hungary) | | GER (Germany) | | Points |

=== Open 4-Stroke ===
Open 4-Stroke is for 4-stroke motorcycles of any engine capacity.

| Team | Constructor | No | Rider | Rounds |
|---|---|---|---|---|
| ODY Racing Team | Beta | 601 | (Slovakia) Ondrej Štofka | 5 |
| ODY Racing Team | KTM | 645 | (Slovakia) Tomáš Vanovčan | 5 |
| Scuderia Ponte Nossa | Gas Gas | 602 | (Italy) Robert Malanchini | 3 |
| Enduro Team Poland M. Wrobel | Gas Gas | 603 | (Poland) Maciej Wieckowski | 5 |
| Bull Bikes Modena Off Road | KTM | 604 | (Italy) Simone Incerti | 3 |
| | Husqvarna | 607 | (Spain) Francisco José García | 1 |
| | KTM | 609 | (Switzerland) Kélien Michaud | 3, 7 |
| | KTM | 610 | (Italy) Giovanni Giovanardi | 3 |
| Mat Motorsport | Gas Gas | 611 | (France) Martin Malvy | 3 |
| Sherco Vukcevic Racing | Sherco | 613 | (Belgium) Jeremy Herinne | 1–3, 5–7 |
| | KTM | 615 | (Spain) David Boixeda | 1 |
| | Sherco | 616 | (Spain) Martin Rioboo | 1 |
| EasyMotos Gas Gas | Gas Gas | 617 | (Portugal) Gonçalo Reis | 1–2, 4, 7 |
| | Husqvarna | 619 | (Germany) Martin Werz | 7 |
| | KTM | 620 | (Italy) Giacomo Maiani | 3 |
| | Gas Gas | 624 | (Spain) Pau Valero | 1–2 |
| Yamaha Offroad Experience | Yamaha | 625 | (United Kingdom) Max Ditchfield | 1 |
| | TM | 626 | (Germany) Max Schafer | 6–7 |
| Team Honda Impala | Honda | 627 | (Spain) Alejandro Ceballos-Escalera | All |
| | KTM | 629 | (Italy) Andrea Bartoli | 3 |
| TM Racing Brazil/TM Boano | TM | 631 | (Brazil) João Pedro Martini | 3 |
| Team Sturm Zschopau | KTM | 638 | (Germany) Maik Schubert | 7 |
| Team Sturm Zschopau | KTM | 644 | (Germany) Kevin Nieschalk | 7 |
| Enduro Team Hungary | KTM | 639 | (Hungary) Norbert Zsigovits | 5–6 |
| | KTM | 640 | (Italy) Riccardo Derocchi | 3 |
| | KTM | 641 | (Czech Republic) Martin Lepka | 5 |
| | KTM | 648 | (Sweden) Ludvig Pettersson | 7 |
| Husqvarna JET Zanardo | Husqvarna | 651 | (Sweden) Robin Wiss | 3–7 |
| OSK Racing Team | Beta | 655 | (Germany) Tom Kölbach | 3, 7 |
| | Sherco | 664 | (Czech Republic) Jan Matejka | 6, 7 |
| KTM GST Berlin Racing | KTM | 665 | (Germany) Nico Rambow | 7 |
| GBO Motorsport | Gas Gas | 666 | (Italy) Samuele Martinelli | 3 |
| | Honda | 667 | (Czech Republic) Lukas Kucera | 5, 7 |
| Motopasión Store | Gas Gas | 668 | (Spain) Cesar Sanchez | 1 |
| Nuñez Motor | Husqvarna | 669 | (Spain) Jorge Paradelo | 1–4 |
| | KTM | 670 | (Czech Republic) Michal Hanus | 5, 7 |
| | Sherco | 677 | (Italy) Lorenzo Pastore | 3 |
| Cocconcelli Moto KTM | KTM | 679 | (Italy) Matteo Bresolin | 3 |
| Team Kadelack Gas Gas | Gas Gas | 689 | (Germany) Garry Dittmann | 7 |
| | Gas Gas | 690 | (Lithuania) Dziugas Kazakevicius | 5 |
| TRT Motorcycles | Gas Gas | 695 | (Spain) Abel Carballés | 1–2, 4 |
| Fantic D'Arpa Racing Team | Fantic | 701 | (Italy) Davide Cutuli | 3 |

=== Riders Championship ===
| Pos | Rider | Bike | ESP (Spain) | | POR (Portugal) | | ITA (Italy) | | POR (Portugal) | | SVK (Slovakia) | | HUN (Hungary) | | GER (Germany) | | Points |
|---|---|---|---|---|---|---|---|---|---|---|---|---|---|---|---|---|---|
| 1 | (Portugal) Gonçalo Reis | Gas Gas | 1 | 1 | 1 | 1 | | | 1 | 1 | | | | | 2 | 2 | 154 |
| 2 | (Spain) Alejandro Ceballos-Escalera | Honda | 2 | 2 | 2 | 3 | 2 | 1 | 2 | 2 | 1 | 2 | 4 | 1 | 1 | 1 | 151 |
| 3 | (Belgium) Jeremy Herinne | Sherco | 6 | 3 | 4 | 4 | 1 | Ret | | | 4 | 4 | 2 | 3 | 15 | 5 | 119 |
| 4 | (Spain) Jorge Paradelo | Husqvarna | 3 | 6 | 3 | 2 | 5 | 4 | 3 | 3 | | | | | | | 111 |
| 5 | (Sweden) Robin Wiss | Husqvarna | | | | | 9 | 6 | 5 | 5 | 6 | DNS | 3 | 4 | 4 | 7 | 92 |
| 6 | (Spain) Abel Carballés | Gas Gas | 4 | 4 | 5 | 5 | | | 4 | 4 | | | | | | | 74 |
| 7 | (Switzerland) Kélien Michaud | KTM | | | | | 6 | 5 | | | | | | | 3 | 3 | 51 |
| 8 | (Hungary) Norbert Zsigovits | KTM | | | | | | | | | Ret | DNS | 1 | 2 | | | 37 |
| 9 | (Czech Republic) Lukas Kucera | Honda | | | | | | | | | 7 | 5 | | | 7 | 8 | 37 |
| 10 | (Poland) Maciej Wieckowski | Gas Gas | | | | | | | | | 3 | 1 | | | | | 35 |
| 11 | (Slovakia) Tomáš Vanovčan | Gas Gas | | | | | | | | | 2 | 3 | | | | | 32 |
| 12 | (Italy) Matteo Bresolin | KTM | | | | | 4 | 2 | | | | | | | | | 30 |
| 13 | (Italy) Robert Malanchini | Gas Gas | | | | | 3 | 3 | | | | | | | | | 30 |
| 14 | (Czech Republic) Michal Hanus | KTM | | | | | | | | | 8 | 6 | | | 10 | 12 | 28 |
| 15 | (Germany) Max Schafer | TM | | | | | | | | | | | 5 | 5 | Ret | 11 | 27 |
| 16 | (Spain) Pau Valero | Gas Gas | 8 | 9 | Ret | 6 | | | | | | | | | | | 25 |
| 17 | (Germany) Kevin Nieschalk | KTM | | | | | | | | | | | | | 5 | 4 | 24 |
| 18 | (Czech Republic) Jan Matejka | Sherco | | | | | | | | | | | 6 | 6 | 12 | Ret | 24 |
| 19 | (United Kingdom) Max Ditchfield | Yamaha | 5 | 5 | | | | | | | | | | | | | 22 |
| 20 | (Germany) Nico Rambow | KTM | | | | | | | | | | | | | 6 | 6 | 20 |
| 21 | (Spain) Cesar Sanchez | Gas Gas | 7 | 7 | | | | | | | | | | | | | 18 |
| 22 | (Italy) Lorenzo Pastore | Sherco | | | | | 7 | 8 | | | | | | | | | 17 |
| 23 | (France) Martin Malvy | Gas Gas | | | | | 10 | 7 | | | | | | | | | 15 |
| 24 | (Germany) Garry Dittmann | Gas Gas | | | | | | | | | | | | | 8 | 10 | 14 |
| 25 | (Spain) David Boixeda | KTM | 10 | 8 | | | | | | | | | | | | | 14 |
| 26 | (Germany) Maik Schubert | KTM | | | | | | | | | | | | | 9 | 9 | 14 |
| 27 | (Spain) Francisco José García | Yamaha | 9 | 10 | | | | | | | | | | | | | 13 |
| 28 | (Brazil) João Pedro Martini | TM | | | | | 11 | 9 | | | | | | | | | 12 |
| 29 | (Germany) Tom Kölbach | Beta | | | | | Ret | 12 | | | | | | | 11 | 13 | 12 |
| 30 | (Lithuania) Dziugas Kazakevicius | Gas Gas | | | | | | | | | 5 | Ret | | | | | 11 |
| 31 | (Italy) Giovanni Giovanardi | KTM | | | | | 12 | 10 | | | | | | | | | 10 |
| 32 | (Italy) Davide Cutuli | Fantic | | | | | 8 | Ret | | | | | | | | | 8 |
| 33 | (Italy) Samuele Martinelli | Gas Gas | | | | | 13 | 11 | | | | | | | | | 8 |
| 34 | (Czech Republic) Martin Lepka | KTM | | | | | | | | | 9 | DNS | | | | | 7 |
| 35 | (Italy) Riccardo Derocchi | KTM | | | | | 14 | 13 | | | | | | | | | 5 |
| 36 | (Germany) Martin Werz | Husqvarna | | | | | | | | | | | | | 13 | DNS | 3 |
| 37 | (Sweden) Ludvig Pettersson | KTM | | | | | | | | | | | | | 14 | Ret | 2 |
| | (Italy) Simone Incerti | KTM | | | | | Ret | Ret | | | | | | | | | 0 |
| | (Spain) Martin Rioboo | Sherco | Ret | DNS | | | | | | | | | | | | | 0 |
| | (Italy) Giacomo Maiani | KTM | | | | | Ret | DNS | | | | | | | | | 0 |
| | (Italy) Andrea Bartoli | KTM | | | | | Ret | DNS | | | | | | | | | 0 |
| | (Slovakia) Ondrej Štofka | Beta | | | | | | | | | Ret | DNS | | | | | 0 |
| Pos | Rider | Bike | ESP (Spain) | | POR (Portugal) | | ITA (Italy) | | POR (Portugal) | | SVK (Slovakia) | | HUN (Hungary) | | GER (Germany) | | Points |
