= 2017 FIM Enduro World Championship =

In Geneva on 15 January 2016, the FIM, ABC Communication and manufacturers reached a unanimous agreement for the creation of categories EnduroGP and Enduro2 from the 2017 season onward.

- EnduroGP: Over 250cc - 2 or 4 stroke. No age limit and no entry limit
- Enduro2: Up to 250cc Moto - 2 or 4 stroke. No age limit and no entry limit
