= Brad Freeman (motorcyclist) =

British motorcycle racer (born 1996)

- Born: 5 July 1996 (age 30); Rugeley, England
- Current team: Factory Beta
- Bike number: 12
- Website: www.betamotor.com/en/racing/racing-enduro/Brad-Freeman

Bradley Freeman (born 5 July 1996, Rugeley, England) is a British professional Enduro racer.

Brad is the reigning Enduro 3 Champion (2024). He and fellow Brit Steve Holcombe have been dominating the Enduro World Championship since 2018 and swept the 2020 EnduroGP, Enduro2 and Enduro3 world titles. They both ride for Factory Beta. Brad claimed the 2021 Enduro 3 title with 11 consecutive wins.

== Championships ==
- FIM Junior Enduro World Champion: 2017
- FIM E1 Enduro World Champion: 2018
- FIM E1 Enduro World Champion: 2019
- FIM EnduroGP World Champion: 2019
- FIM E3 Enduro World Champion: 2020
- FIM E3 Enduro World Champion: 2021
- FIM Enduro GP World Champion: 2021
- FIM E3 Enduro World Champion: 2022
- FIM E3 Enduro World Champion: 2023
- FIM E3 Enduro World Champion: 2024
