= Steve Holcombe =

British Enduro rider

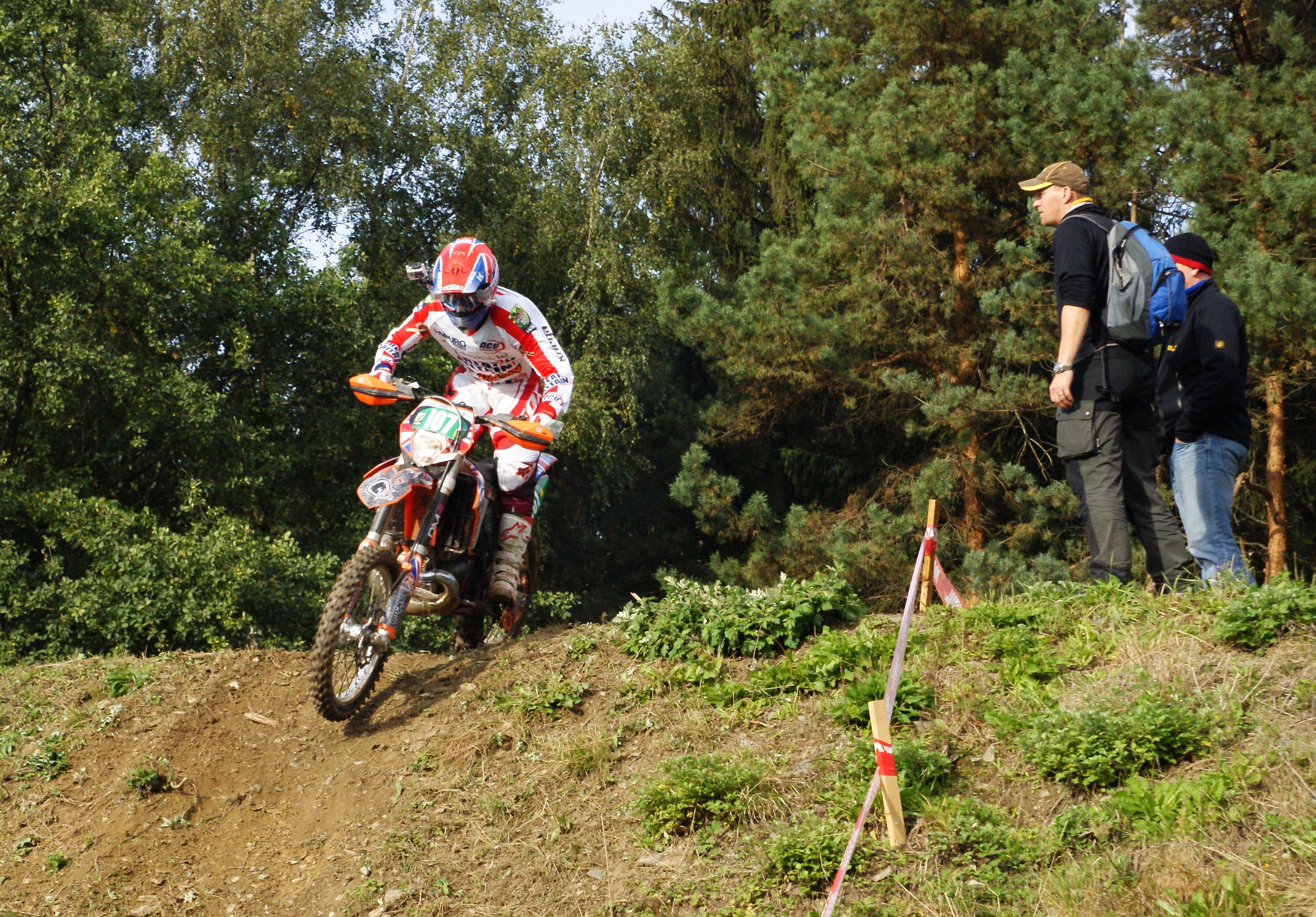
- Born: 16 May 1994 (age 32); North Devon, England
- Current team: Honda Redmoto
- Bike number: 1
- Website: https://www.betamotor.com/en/racing/racing-enduro/steve-holcombe/

Steve Holcombe (born 16 May 1994) is a British professional Enduro racer. Nine time World FIM EnduroGP Champion, four time Enduro GP overall champ 2017, 2018, 2020 & 2023, three time Enduro 3 (E3) champion 2016, 2018 & 2019 and two time Enduro 2 (E2) champ 2020 & 2023. He rides for Factory Beta. He and fellow Brit Brad Freeman are currently dominating the Enduro World Championship having swept the 2020 EnduroGP, Enduro2 and Enduro3 world titles.
