= Instituto Piaget =

Portuguese private institution of higher education

Piaget Institute
- Instituto Piaget
- Type: Private university
- Established: 1979
- Location: Almada, Macedo de Cavaleiros, Santo André, Silves, Vila Nova de Gaia and Viseu., Portugal
- Website: www.ipiaget.org

Instituto Piaget is a Portuguese private institution of higher education. It provides both university and polytechnic higher education in a number of fields. Instituto Piaget was named after the Swiss philosopher and developmental psychologist Jean Piaget.

It has campuses in several locations of Portugal, namely in Almada, Macedo de Cavaleiros, Santo André, Silves, Vila Nova de Gaia and Viseu.

Besides the campuses in Portugal, the Instituto Piaget has affiliated institutions in Angola, Brazil, Cape Verde, Guinea-Bissau and Mozambique.

== Academics in Portugal ==
=== Campuses, institutes and schools ===
- Almada University Campus:
  - Jean Piaget School of Education of Almada
  - Institute of Intercultural and Transdisciplinary Studies of Almada
- Macedo de Cavaleiros Academic Campus:
  - Jean Piaget School of Education of Macedo de Cavaleiros
  - Jean Piaget School of Health of Macedo de Cavaleiros
- Silves Academic Campus:
  - Jean Piaget School of Health of Silves
- Vila Nova de Gaia Academic Campus:
  - Jean Piaget School of Education of Vila Nova de Gaia
  - Jean Piaget School of Health of Vila Nova de Gaia
- Santo André Academic Campus:
  - Jean Piaget School of Technology and Management
- Viseu University Campus:
  - Jean Piaget School of Education of Viseu
  - Jean Piaget School of Health of Viseu
  - Institute of Intercultural and Transdisciplinary Studies of Viseu

=== Programmes ===
- Bachelor (licenciatura) degrees:
  - Environment, health and safety
  - Sociocultural animation
  - Food science
  - Dietetics
  - Basic education
  - Physical education and sports
  - Nursing
  - Petroleum engineering
  - Pharmacy
  - Physiotherapy
  - Osteopathy
  - Management
  - Human movement
  - Music
  - Psychology
  - Radiology
  - Occupational therapy
- Master's degrees:
  - Sustained health cares
  - Special education
  - Pre-school education
  - Pre-school education and 1st cycle of basic education teaching
  - Physical education teaching in the basic and secondary education
  - Musical education teaching in the basic education
  - Music teaching
  - 1st and 2nd cycles of basic education teaching
  - Food processing and innovation
  - Health and clinic psychology
  - Organizational and social psychology
  - Pedagogics supervision and evaluation
- Other programmes:

Besides bachelor and master programmes, Instituto Piaget also offers non-degree granting programmes in the fields of education, health, environment and tourism.

== International academics ==
Instituto Piaget also has a presence out of Portugal, with a number of affiliated higher education institutions in several Portuguese speaking countries, namely:

- Universidade Jean Piaget de Angola - Viana and Benguela, Angola
- Faculdade Piaget - Suzano, São Paulo, Brazil
- Universidade Jean Piaget de Cabo Verde - Praia and Mindelo, Cape Verde
- Universidade Jean Piaget da Guiné-Bissau - Bissau, Guinea-Bissau
- Universidade Jean Piaget de Moçambique - Beira, Mozambique

== See also ==
- Higher education in Portugal
- List of higher education institutions in Portugal
