= 2024 FIM Enduro World Championship =

2024 world enduro championship season

The 2024 World Enduro Championship is the 35th season of the FIM World Enduro Championship. The season consists of seven events.

Steve Holcombe goes into the championship after winning both the EnduroGP and Enduro 2 classes in 2023. Josep García is the reigning Enduro 1 champion, with Brad Freeman going into the season after taking the Enduro 3 title the previous season.

== Calendar ==
A seven-round calendar was announced in October 2023.

Round	Event	Location	Dates
1	Portugal	Fafe	5–7 April
2	Portugal	Valpaços	12–14 April
3	Romania	Bacău	10–12 May
4	Italy	Bettola	21–23 June
5	Slovakia	Gelnica	12–14 July
6	United Kingdom	Rhayader	2–4 August
7	France	Brioude	13–15 September

== EnduroGP ==
=== Participants ===
Enduro 1 Riders
Team	Constructor	No	Rider	Rounds
Honda Racing RedMoto Enduro Team	Honda	1	(United Kingdom) Steve Holcombe	All
Honda Racing RedMoto Enduro Team	Honda	22	(Italy) Thomas Oldrati	3
JET Zanardo Racing Team	Husqvarna	3	(France) Christophe Charlier	4
Sherco Factory Racing	Sherco	6	(Germany) Jeremy Sydow	All
Sherco Factory Racing	Sherco	101	(France) Zach Pichon	All
MGR Racing Team	Kawasaki	10	(Italy) Davide Soreca	All
Team Beta Oxmoto	Beta	17	(France) Theophile Espinasse	All
Yamaha Johansson MPE	Yamaha	19	(Finland) Roni Kytönen	All
Red Bull KTM Factory Racing	KTM	26	(Spain) Josep García	All
Team Elite Factory Honda Motul	Honda	56	(France) Hugo Blanjoue	7
Beta Entrophy Team	Beta	58	(Finland) Hermanni Haljala	1–6
Fast Eddy Racing Team	Husqvarna	68	(United Kingdom) Jamie McCanney	1–4
Fast Eddy Racing Team	Husqvarna	118	(United Kingdom) Jack Edmondson	6
TM Boano Factory Team	TM	95	(Italy) Lorenzo Macoritto	1–5
Electraction TM Racing UK	TM	147	(United Kingdom) Jordan Scott	1–2, 6–7
Oliveira Racing Team	Yamaha	231	(Portugal) Luís Oliveira	1–2
Harmsen MX Service	Sherco	255	(Netherlands) Max Schwarte	4
SP Moto	KTM	282	(Slovakia) Jaroslav Dubóczi	5
Enduro 2 Riders
Team	Constructor	No	Rider	Rounds
Sherco Factory Racing	Sherco	7	(Australia) Wil Ruprecht	All
TM Boano Factory Team	TM	8	(France) Léo Le Quéré	All
Honda Racing RedMoto Enduro Team	Honda	23	(Italy) Samuele Bernardini	All
Husqvarna Motorcycles Spain	Husqvarna	27	(Spain) Sergio Navarro	1–2
Fantic Racing Enduro Team	Fantic	47	(United Kingdom) Jed Etchells	All
MGR Racing Team	Kawasaki	50	(Poland) Aleksander Bracik	All
Fast Eddy Racing Team	Husqvarna	69	(Sweden) Mikael Persson	1–2
Althea Racing	Husqvarna	72	(Sweden) Lucas Vågberg	1–2
Beta Trueba	Beta	82	(Spain) Julio Pando	6–7
Beta Factory Enduro Team	Beta	91	(United Kingdom) Nathan Watson	All
JET Zanardo Racing Team	Husqvarna	98	(Italy) Matteo Pavoni	All
Gas Gas Factory Racing	Gas Gas	99	(Italy) Andrea Verona	All
KBS UAMK Team	Husqvarna	123	(Czech Republic) Kryštof Kouble	All
GTG Motogamma Lunigiana Team	Gas Gas	178	(Chile) Benjamín Herrera	1–5
E.T. James Motorcycles	Gas Gas	191	(United Kingdom) Alex Walton	6
E.T. James Motorcycles	Gas Gas	246	(United Kingdom) Harry Houghton	1–2, 6
WP Eric Augé	Husqvarna	195	(Sweden) Albin Elowson	All
Yamaha Offroad Experience	Yamaha	204	(United Kingdom) Aaron Gordon	6
Fast Eddy Racing Team	Husqvarna	206	(United States) Joshua Toth	6
Team Lastra	Gas Gas	214	(Italy) Federico Ulissi	4
Team Bonneton2Roues Fantic	Fantic	221	(France) Enzo Marchal	7
Redline Motorcycles/KTM UK	KTM	222	(United Kingdom) Daniel Mundell	6
3G Factory Team	KTM	270	(Italy) Gianluca Riccoboni	4
Enduro 3 Riders
Team	Constructor	No	Rider	Rounds
Yamaha Johansson MPE	Yamaha	2	(Spain) Marc Sans	1–2, 5, 7
Rieju Factory Team	Rieju	4	(France) Loïc Larrieu	All
Rieju Factory Team	Rieju	251	(Poland) Dominik Olszowy	4
Beta Factory Enduro Team	Beta	12	(United Kingdom) Brad Freeman	All
TM Boano Factory Team	TM	25	(Italy) Matteo Cavallo	All
JET Zanardo Racing Team	Husqvarna	41	(Italy) Morgan Lesiardo	All
Beta UK	Beta	43	(United Kingdom) Daniel McCanney	6
Sherco Factory Racing	Sherco	51	(France) Julien Roussaly	All
Sherco Factory Racing	Sherco	71	(Belgium) Antoine Magain	1–4, 7
Sherco Factory Racing	Sherco	76	(New Zealand) Hamish MacDonald	All
GTG Motogamma Lunigiana Team	Gas Gas	62	(Germany) Luca Fischeder	1, 3–5, 7
Atomic Moto	Husqvarna	64	(France) Anthony Geslin	7
WP Eric Augé	KTM	94	(Spain) Jaume Betriu	All
Fantic Racing Enduro Team	Fantic	97	(Sweden) Albin Norrbin	All
Factory Image Racing KTM	KTM	117	(United Kingdom) Fraser Flockhart	6
TM Boano Factory/Delpi Moto/TM Belgium	TM	198	(Belgium) Erik Willems	1–2
Dafy Enduro Team	KTM	210	(France) Luc Fargier	7
AL860 Motorsport	Beta	212	(Italy) Andrea La Scala	4, 7
3Bros/Hatch Racing	Gas Gas	218	(Italy) Giacomo Redondi	4
	Beta	224	(Italy) Mirko Ciani	4
3G Factory Team	KTM	225	(Italy) Mirko Tambini	4
	Husqvarna	235	(Italy) Andrea Castellana	4

=== Riders Championship ===
Pos	Rider	Bike	Class	POR (Portugal)		POR (Portugal)		ROM (Romania)		ITA (Italy)		SVK (Slovakia)		GBR (United Kingdom)		FRA (France)		Points
1	(Spain) Josep García	KTM	Enduro 1	1	2	1	3	2	1	1	3	4	1	3	1	1	3	247
2	(United Kingdom) Steve Holcombe	Honda	Enduro 1	3	1	2	1	3	5	4	2	3	5	1	3	2	2	223
3	(Italy) Andrea Verona	Gas Gas	Enduro 2	2	4	3	2	1	2	3	1	1	3	4	4	3	4	223
4	(United Kingdom) Brad Freeman	Beta	Enduro 3	5	Ret	4	6	4	3	2	10	5	2	2	2	4	1	180
5	(United Kingdom) Nathan Watson	Beta	Enduro 2	4	3	Ret	4	6	4	5	11	2	4	6	7	Ret	DNS	129
6	(France) Zach Pichon	Sherco	Enduro 1	9	10	12	8	7	6	8	5	11	11	8	5	5	5	114
7	(New Zealand) Hamish MacDonald	Sherco	Enduro 3	6	7	5	29	29	25	6	6	7	7	7	9	7	9	100
8	(Italy) Samuele Bernardini	Honda	Enduro 2	7	5	7	7	13	9	13	8	9	9	9	8	8	13	99
9	(Italy) Matteo Cavallo	TM	Enduro 3	11	9	10	10	11	8	7	22	10	8	13	24	11	6	78
10	(Australia) Wil Ruprecht	Sherco	Enduro 2	22	27	11	23	19	Ret	21	21	6	6	5	6	9	7	62
11	(France) Theophile Espinasse	Beta	Enduro 1	15	16	13	14	8	13	19	9	8	10	Ret	DNS	6	8	56
12	(United Kingdom) Jamie McCanney	Husqvarna	Enduro 1	10	8	6	5	5	7	27	Ret							55
13	(Germany) Jeremy Sydow	Sherco	Enduro 1	14	14	Ret	9	9	15	22	26	12	12	11	18	15	12	37
14	(Belgium) Antoine Magain	Sherco	Enduro 3	16	19	Ret	DNS	15	Ret	9	4					10	10	33
15	(Sweden) Albin Norrbin	Fantic	Enduro 3	23	17	9	12	12	11	26	17	14	15	20	12	23	18	28
16	(United Kingdom) Jed Etchells	Fantic	Enduro 2	12	11	18	13	18	12	11	18	20	Ret	12	16	18	14	27
17	(Sweden) Mikael Persson	Husqvarna	Enduro 2	8	6	8	DNS											26
18	(Italy) Matteo Pavoni	Husqvarna	Enduro 2	13	18	20	19	30	17	12	7	13	13	17	14	16	23	24
19	(Italy) Morgan Lesiardo	Husqvarna	Enduro 3	21	15	14	11	16	10	16	15	15	14	31	19	12	16	22
20	(France) Julien Roussaly	Sherco	Enduro 3	17	12	15	15	14	14	20	12	17	19	18	15	14	17	17
21	(France) Léo Le Quéré	TM	Enduro 2	25	25	24	24	25	22	15	13	18	17	16	17	19	11	9
22	(Sweden) Albin Elowson	Husqvarna	Enduro 2	24	21	22	20	10	24	30	Ret	25	22	14	25	20	24	8
23	(Finland) Roni Kytönen	Yamaha	Enduro 1	26	DNS	16	16	17	16	29	30	19	16	19	10	24	DNS	6
24	(United Kingdom) Daniel Mundell	KTM	Enduro 2											10	Ret			6
25	(Italy) Lorenzo Macoritto	TM	Enduro 1	18	23	29	22	22	19	10	16	21	Ret					6
26	(United States) Joshua Toth	Husqvarna	Enduro 2											15	11			6
27	(France) Hugo Blanjoue	Honda	Enduro 1													13	15	4
28	(Poland) Dominik Olszowy	Rieju	Enduro 3							14	14							4
29	(Czech Republic) Kryštof Kouble	Husqvarna	Enduro 2	20	20	17	21	Ret	Ret	23	28	16	18	24	13	25	20	3
30	(Spain) Jaume Betriu	KTM	Enduro 3	19	13	19	17	30	DNS	31	25	24	23	25	22	30	26	3
Pos	Rider	Bike	Class	POR (Portugal)		POR (Portugal)		ROM (Romania)		ITA (Italy)		SVK (Slovakia)		GBR (United Kingdom)		FRA (France)		Points

=== Enduro 1 ===
Enduro 1 is for motorcycles up to and including 250cc, both 2-stroke and 4-stroke.

Pos	Rider	Bike	POR (Portugal)		POR (Portugal)		ROM (Romania)		ITA (Italy)		SVK (Slovakia)		GBR (United Kingdom)		FRA (France)		Points
1	(Spain) Josep García	KTM	1	2	1	2	1	1	1	2	2	1	2	1	1	2	262
2	(United Kingdom) Steve Holcombe	Honda	2	1	2	1	2	2	2	1	1	2	1	2	2	1	256
3	(France) Zach Pichon	Sherco	3	4	4	4	4	3	3	3	4	4	3	3	3	3	198
4	(France) Theophile Espinasse	Beta	6	6	5	6	5	5	5	4	3	3	Ret	DNS	4	4	143
5	(Germany) Jeremy Sydow	Sherco	5	5	Ret	5	6	6	6	7	5	5	4	5	6	5	139
6	(Italy) Davide Soreca	Kawasaki	9	8	7	9	8	9	7	6	8	7	6	6	7	7	120
7	(Finland) Roni Kytönen	Yamaha	8	DNS	6	7	7	7	9	10	6	6	5	4	8	DNS	110
8	(United Kingdom) Jamie McCanney	Husqvarna	4	3	3	3	3	4	8	Ret							94
9	(Italy) Lorenzo Macoritto	TM	7	7	8	8	9	8	4	5	7	Ret					82
10	(Finland) Hermanni Haljala	Beta	10	9	9	10	11	Ret	10	8	Ret	8	9	8			68
11	(United Kingdom) Jordan Scott	TM	11	10	10	Ret							8	7	9	8	49
12	(France) Hugo Blanjoue	Honda													5	6	21
13	(Portugal) Luís Oliveira	Yamaha	12	11	11	11											19
14	(Slovakia) Jaroslav Dubóczi	KTM									9	9					14
15	(France) Christophe Charlier	Husqvarna							11	9							12
16	(United Kingdom) Jack Edmondson	Husqvarna											7	Ret			9
17	(Netherlands) Max Schwarte	Sherco							12	11							9
18	(Italy) Thomas Oldrati	Honda					10	Ret									6
Pos	Rider	Bike	POR (Portugal)		POR (Portugal)		ROM (Romania)		ITA (Italy)		SVK (Slovakia)		GBR (United Kingdom)		FRA (France)		Points

=== Enduro 2 ===
Enduro 2 is for 4-stroke motorcycles from 255cc-450cc.

Pos	Rider	Bike	POR (Portugal)		POR (Portugal)		ROM (Romania)		ITA (Italy)		SVK (Slovakia)		GBR (United Kingdom)		FRA (France)		Points
1	(Italy) Andrea Verona	Gas Gas	1	2	1	1	1	1	1	1	1	1	1	1	1	1	277
2	(Italy) Samuele Bernardini	Honda	3	3	2	3	4	3	5	3	4	4	4	4	2	4	198
3	(United Kingdom) Nathan Watson	Beta	2	1	Ret	2	2	2	2	4	2	2	3	3	Ret	DNS	182
4	(Australia) Wil Ruprecht	Sherco	8	12	4	9	6	Ret	8	7	3	3	2	2	3	2	155
5	(Italy) Matteo Pavoni	Husqvarna	6	6	7	6	7	5	4	2	5	5	10	7	4	7	148
6	(United Kingdom) Jed Etchells	Fantic	5	5	6	4	5	4	3	6	8	Ret	6	8	5	5	142
7	(France) Léo Le Quéré	TM	10	10	11	10	9	7	6	5	7	6	9	9	6	3	118
8	(Sweden) Albin Elowson	Husqvarna	9	8	9	7	3	8	10	Ret	9	8	7	10	7	8	107
9	(Czech Republic) Kryštof Kouble	Husqvarna	7	7	5	8	Ret	Ret	9	9	6	7	11	6	8	6	103
10	(Chile) Benjamín Herrera	Gas Gas	11	11	8	13	8	6	7	8	10	9					69
11	(Poland) Aleksander Bracik	Kawasaki	15	15	13	14	10	9	12	10	11	10	Ret	14	11	11	53
12	(Sweden) Mikael Persson	Husqvarna	4	4	3	DNS											41
13	(Spain) Sergio Navarro	Husqvarna	13	9	10	5											27
14	(United States) Joshua Toth	Husqvarna											8	5			19
15	(United Kingdom) Harry Houghton	Gas Gas	12	13	14	12							13	13			19
16	(France) Enzo Marchal	Fantic													9	9	14
17	(Spain) Julio Pando	Beta											14	Ret	10	10	14
18	(Sweden) Lucas Vågberg	Husqvarna	14	14	12	11											13
19	(United Kingdom) Daniel Mundell	KTM											5	Ret			11
20	(Italy) Federico Ulissi	Gas Gas							11	11							10
21	(United Kingdom) Alex Walton	Gas Gas											12	11			11
22	(Italy) Gianluca Riccoboni	KTM							13	12							7
23	(United Kingdom) Aaron Gordon	Yamaha											15	12			5
Pos	Rider	Bike	POR (Portugal)		POR (Portugal)		ROM (Romania)		ITA (Italy)		SVK (Slovakia)		GBR (United Kingdom)		FRA (France)		Points

=== Enduro 3 ===
Enduro 3 is for 2-stroke motorcycles over 255cc and 4-stroke motorcycles over 455cc.

Pos	Rider	Bike	POR (Portugal)		POR (Portugal)		ROM (Romania)		ITA (Italy)		SVK (Slovakia)		GBR (United Kingdom)		FRA (France)		Points
1	(United Kingdom) Brad Freeman	Beta	1	Ret	1	1	1	1	1	3	1	1	1	1	1	1	255
2	(New Zealand) Hamish MacDonald	Sherco	2	1	2	9	9	8	2	2	2	2	2	2	2	3	210
3	(Italy) Matteo Cavallo	TM	3	2	4	2	2	2	3	10	3	3	3	9	4	2	199
4	(France) Julien Roussaly	Sherco	5	3	6	5	4	5	8	4	6	6	4	4	6	6	158
5	(Sweden) Albin Norrbin	Fantic	8	6	3	4	3	4	10	7	4	5	5	3	9	7	155
6	(Italy) Morgan Lesiardo	Husqvarna	7	5	5	3	6	3	6	6	5	4	9	5	5	5	155
7	(Spain) Jaume Betriu	KTM	6	4	7	6	10	DNS	12	11	8	8	7	8	13	11	98
8	(Belgium) Antoine Magain	Sherco	4	7	Ret	DNS	5	Ret	4	1					3	4	94
9	(France) Loïc Larrieu	Rieju	Ret	DNS	9	7	8	6	11	8	7	7	8	7	8	13	93
10	(Germany) Luca Fischeder	Gas Gas	Ret	DNS			7	7	7	9	Ret	DNS			12	9	45
11	(Spain) Marc Sans	Yamaha	10	9	Ret	10					9	9			11	12	42
12	(Belgium) Erik Willems	TM	9	8	8	8											31
13	(Poland) Dominik Olszowy	Rieju							5	5							22
14	(United Kingdom) Daniel McCanney	Beta											6	6			20
15	(France) Luc Fargier	KTM													7	8	17
16	(France) Anthony Geslin	Husqvarna													10	10	12
17	(United Kingdom) Fraser Flockhart	KTM											10	10			12
18	(Italy) Giacomo Redondi	Gas Gas							9	Ret							7
19	(Italy) Mirko Ciani	Beta							14	12							6
20	(Italy) Andrea Castellana	Husqvarna							13	13							6
21	(Italy) Andrea La Scala	Beta							16	15					14	14	5
22	(Italy) Mirko Tambini	KTM							15	14							3
Pos	Rider	Bike	POR (Portugal)		POR (Portugal)		ROM (Romania)		ITA (Italy)		SVK (Slovakia)		GBR (United Kingdom)		FRA (France)		Points

== Junior ==
All riders competing in the Junior world championships must be younger than 23 years of age on 1 January of the year of the championship.

=== Participants ===
Junior 1 Riders
Team	Constructor	No	Rider	Rounds
GTG Motogamma Lunigiana Team	Gas Gas	13	(Italy) Enrico Rinaldi	1–6
WP Eric Augé	Gas Gas	14	(United Kingdom) Sam Davies	All
WP Eric Augé	KTM	122	(Chile) Juan Pablo Clericus	1–2, 5, 7
Fast Eddy Racing Team	Beta	16	(United Kingdom) Harry Edmondson	1–2, 6–7
E.T. James Motorcycles	Sherco	20	(United Kingdom) Jack Probert	1–2, 6–7
	Yamaha	30	(United Kingdom) Max Ingham	6
Fantic Racing Enduro Team	Fantic	34	(Italy) Kevin Cristino	All
Honda Racing RedMoto Enduro Team	Honda	38	(Italy) Manolo Morettini	All
Osellini Team	Husqvarna	40	(Italy) Riccardo Fabris	1–4
Yamaha Johansson MPE	Yamaha	65	(Sweden) Arvid Modin	All
Yamaha Johansson MPE	Yamaha	228	(Australia) Kyron Bacon	4–5
Rieju Factory Team	Rieju	73	(Portugal) Frederico Rocha	1–2, 4–7
Beta Entrophy Team	Beta	80	(Italy) Davide Mei	1, 4–7
Team KTM Pro Racing Sport	KTM	90	(Italy) Manuel Verzeroli	7
Team Beta Oxmoto	Beta	96	(France) Leo Joyon	All
Sherco Academy France	Sherco	105	(France) Thibault Giraudon	All
Yamaha Offroad Experience	Yamaha	127	(United Kingdom) Charlie Chater	6
Honda Racing RedMoto	Honda	147	(Italy) Alessandro Guerra	5–7
Suspensiones HRG/Six Lyon Bikes	Gas Gas	148	(Spain) Jan Olivera	4
3G Factory Team	KTM	216	(Italy) Samuele Tambini	4
Dafy Enduro Team	KTM	226	(France) Corentin Amathe	7
	Gas Gas	234	(United Kingdom) Will Cawte	6
KTM Seles Moto	KTM	250	(Slovenia) Gal Hauptman	4–5
Moto Veci/Platinum X Designs	KTM	254	(Slovakia) Lukáš Trško	5, 7
	TM	273	(Italy) Simone Angeretti	5
	Gas Gas	280	(United Kingdom) Jack Keenan	6
MotoProX Racing Team	Husqvarna	298	(Slovakia) Jakub Vida	5
Junior 2 Riders
Team	Constructor	No	Rider	Rounds
GTG Motogamma Lunigiana Team	Gas Gas	13	(Italy) Enrico Rinaldi	7
GTG Motogamma Lunigiana Team	Gas Gas	59	(Chile) Camilo Herrera	4
GTG Motogamma Lunigiana Team	Gas Gas	179	(Italy) Nicola Salvini	7
Team Beta Oxmoto	Beta	18	(France) Antoine Alix	1–3, 5–7
Gas Gas España	Gas Gas	28	(Spain) Albert Fontova	1–3, 5–7
MGR Racing Team	Kawasaki	36	(Norway) Herman Ask	All
Beta Entrophy Team	Beta	53	(Finland) Samuli Puhakainen	All
Fantic Racing Enduro Team	Fantic	54	(Sweden) Axel Semb	All
PAR Enduro Team	Fantic	55	(United Kingdom) Sion Evans	6
Osellini Team	Husqvarna	87	(Sweden) Lucas Bergström	1–6
Czech Enduro Team	Sherco	100	(Czech Republic) Jaroslav Kalný	All
Czech Enduro Team	Husqvarna	128	(Czech Republic) Tomáš Holý	1–2, 4
Czech Enduro Team	Husqvarna	169	(Czech Republic) Zdeněk Pitel	3
	Rieju	119	(Italy) Lorenzo Bernini	2–7
Suspensiones HRG/Six Lyon Bikes	Husqvarna	148	(Spain) Jan Olivera	1
Team KTM Pro Racing Sport	KTM	151	(Sweden) Max Ahlin	All
Team KTM Pro Racing Sport	KTM	259	(Italy) Giulio Nava	4
KBS UAMK Team	Beta	152	(Czech Republic) Matěj Škuta	All
Groupe DSN Motos	Kawasaki	154	(France) Mathis Juillard	7
Rieju Factory Team	Rieju	188	(Spain) Bruno Bozzo	1–2, 5, 7
Team Bonneton2Roues	Fantic	205	(France) Dorian Simon	4, 7
Dafy Enduro Team	KTM	255	(France) Theo Bencheikh	7
Atomic Moto	Beta	264	(France) Diego Haution	4, 7
	Sherco	274	(France) Evan Raffard	2
Osičie Enduro Team	Gas Gas	277	(Slovakia) Patrik Ficel	5
KTM USA	KTM	281	(Australia) Angus Riordan	6
KTM Off Road Racing Team NZ	KTM	282	(New Zealand) Ryan Hayward	6
Beta UK	Beta	283	(United Kingdom) Ben Clark	6

=== Riders Championship ===
Pos	Rider	Bike	Class	POR (Portugal)		POR (Portugal)		ROM (Romania)		ITA (Italy)		SVK (Slovakia)		GBR (United Kingdom)		FRA (France)		Points
1	(Sweden) Max Ahlin	KTM	Junior 2	6	5	3	2	1	1	1	2	2	2	2	1	2	1	238
2	(Sweden) Axel Semb	Fantic	Junior 2	1	3	1	1	3	2	3	16	11	6	4	3	7	12	178
3	(Italy) Kevin Cristino	Fantic	Junior 1	2	7	2	4	2	3	6	9	6	3	5	DSQ	4	2	171
4	(Italy) Manolo Morettini	Honda	Junior 1	3	6	5	3	8	6	4	1	8	9	7	9	5	3	159
5	(France) Thibault Giraudon	Sherco	Junior 1	4	2	Ret	DNS	7	5	2	4	3	7	8	6	1	4	155
6	(France) Leo Joyon	Beta	Junior 1	5	4	7	7	5	7	5	15	5	5	3	5	3	8	145
7	(France) Antoine Alix	Beta	Junior 2	10	1	4	6	6	9			7	12	6	4	6	5	123
8	(Czech Republic) Matěj Škuta	Beta	Junior 2	14	11	11	10	4	4	7	10	4	4	11	13	18	19	93
9	(Italy) Enrico Rinaldi	Gas Gas	Junior 1	8	9	8	9	10	10	10	5	10	11	19	16	10	7	85
10	(United Kingdom) Harry Edmondson	Beta	Junior 1	7	8	10	8							9	7	8	6	65
11	(Australia) Kyron Bacon	Yamaha	Junior 1							8	3	1	1					63
12	(Spain) Albert Fontova	Gas Gas	Junior 2	9	10	6	5	Ret	DNS			17	10	10	8	17	9	61
13	(Finland) Samuli Puhakainen	Beta	Junior 2	12	12	9	Ret	9	8	12	11	9	8	20	Ret	13	18	57
14	(Australia) Angus Riordan	KTM	Junior 2											1	2			37
15	(Czech Republic) Jaroslav Kalný	Sherco	Junior 2	11	13	14	13	11	12	17	17	13	13	18	15	15	10	36
16	(Sweden) Arvid Modin	Yamaha	Junior 1	18	17	12	11	Ret	16	19	14	16	19	12	12	11	14	26
17	(France) Diego Haution	Beta	Junior 2							14	6					9	11	24
18	(Italy) Davide Mei	Beta	Junior 1	15	14					13	7	14	Ret	17	14	14	13	24
19	(United Kingdom) Sam Davies	Gas Gas	Junior 1	16	15	15	12	13	11	16	20	15	Ret	15	11	Ret	17	21
20	(Sweden) Lucas Bergström	Husqvarna	Junior 2	13	16	13	14	16	14	20	12	12	15	Ret	DNS			19
21	(Chile) Camilo Herrera	Gas Gas	Junior 2							11	8							13
22	(Italy) Lorenzo Bernini	Rieju	Junior 2			17	15	15	15	18	22	20	14	13	Ret	12	Ret	12
23	(Italy) Riccardo Fabris	Husqvarna	Junior 1	Ret	18	18	Ret	12	13	15	13							11
24	(France) Dorian Simon	Fantic	Junior 2							9	18					23	20	7
25	(United Kingdom) Max Ingham	Yamaha	Junior 1											16	10			6
26	(United Kingdom) Charlie Chater	Yamaha	Junior 1											14	18			2
27	(Norway) Herman Ask	Kawasaki	Junior 2	19	20	20	17	14	Ret	21	19	19	17	23	20	21	22	2
28	(France) Mathis Juillard	Kawasaki	Junior 2													19	15	1
Pos	Rider	Bike	Class	POR (Portugal)		POR (Portugal)		ROM (Romania)		ITA (Italy)		SVK (Slovakia)		GBR (United Kingdom)		FRA (France)		Points

=== Junior 1 ===
Junior 1 is for motorcycles up to and including 250cc, both 2-stroke and 4-stroke.

Pos	Rider	Bike	POR (Portugal)		POR (Portugal)		ROM (Romania)		ITA (Italy)		SVK (Slovakia)		GBR (United Kingdom)		FRA (France)		Points
1	(Italy) Kevin Cristino	Fantic	1	4	1	2	1	1	4	6	4	2	2	DSQ	3	1	215
2	(Italy) Manolo Morettini	Honda	2	3	2	1	4	3	2	1	5	5	3	4	4	2	214
3	(France) Leo Joyon	Beta	4	2	3	3	2	4	3	9	3	3	1	1	2	5	210
4	(France) Thibault Giraudon	Sherco	3	1	Ret	DNS	3	2	1	3	2	4	4	2	1	3	197
5	(Italy) Enrico Rinaldi	Gas Gas	6	6	4	5	5	5	6	4	6	6	11	9			121
6	(Sweden) Arvid Modin	Yamaha	9	9	6	6	Ret	8	10	8	9	9	6	7	6	7	108
7	(United Kingdom) Sam Davies	Gas Gas	8	8	7	7	7	6	9	10	8	Ret	8	6	Ret	8	100
8	(United Kingdom) Harry Edmondson	Beta	5	5	5	4							5	3	5	4	96
9	(Italy) Davide Mei	Beta	7	7					7	5	7	Ret	10	8	7	6	80
10	(Australia) Kyron Bacon	Yamaha							5	2	1	1					68
11	(Italy) Riccardo Fabris	Husqvarna	Ret	10	8	Ret	6	7	8	7							50
12	(Portugal) Frederico Rocha	Rieju	11	11	Ret	8			12	Ret	14	DNS	13	11	11	11	42
13	(United Kingdom) Jack Probert	Sherco	Ret	12	10	9							14	13	10	13	31
14	(Chile) Juan Pablo Clericus	KTM	10	Ret	9	Ret					10	8			Ret	DNS	27
15	(Italy) Alessandro Guerra	Honda									13	11	12	12	9	12	27
16	(Slovakia) Lukáš Trško	KTM									12	10			8	9	25
17	(Slovenia) Gal Hauptman	KTM							11	11	11	7					24
18	(United Kingdom) Max Ingham	Yamaha											9	5			18
19	(United Kingdom) Charlie Chater	Yamaha											7	10			15
20	(Spain) Jan Olivera	Gas Gas							13	12							7
21	(France) Corentin Amathe	KTM													Ret	10	6
22	(Italy) Simone Angeretti	TM									15	12					5
23	(Italy) Samuele Tambini	KTM							14	13							5
24	(United Kingdom) Will Cawte	Gas Gas											15	Ret			1
	(Slovakia) Jakub Vida	Husqvarna									Ret	DNS					0
	(United Kingdom) Jack Keenan	Gas Gas											Ret	DNS			0
Pos	Rider	Bike	POR (Portugal)		POR (Portugal)		ROM (Romania)		ITA (Italy)		SVK (Slovakia)		GBR (United Kingdom)		FRA (France)		Points

=== Junior 2 ===
Junior 2 is for motorcycles over 255cc, both 2-stroke and 4-stroke.

Pos	Rider	Bike	POR (Portugal)		POR (Portugal)		ROM (Romania)		ITA (Italy)		SVK (Slovakia)		GBR (United Kingdom)		FRA (France)		Points
1	(Sweden) Max Ahlin	KTM	2	3	2	2	1	1	1	1	1	1	2	1	1	1	263
2	(Sweden) Axel Semb	Fantic	1	2	1	1	2	2	2	7	5	3	3	3	3	6	218
3	(France) Antoine Alix	Beta	4	1	3	4	4	5			3	6	4	4	2	2	170
4	(Czech Republic) Matěj Škuta	Beta	8	5	6	5	3	3	3	4	2	2	6	6	9	9	166
5	(Czech Republic) Jaroslav Kalný	Sherco	5	7	8	6	6	6	8	8	7	7	8	7	7	4	131
6	(Finland) Samuli Puhakainen	Beta	6	6	5	Ret	5	4	6	5	4	4	9	Ret	6	8	127
7	(Spain) Albert Fontova	Gas Gas	3	4	4	3	Ret	DNS			8	5	5	5	8	3	120
8	(Sweden) Lucas Bergström	Husqvarna	7	8	7	7	9	7	10	6	6	9	Ret	DNS			84
9	(Italy) Lorenzo Bernini	Rieju			10	8	8	8	9	11	10	8	7	Ret	5	Ret	76
10	(Norway) Herman Ask	Kawasaki	10	9	11	9	7	Ret	11	10	9	10	12	10	12	12	76
11	(France) Diego Haution	Beta							7	2					4	5	50
12	(Spain) Bruno Bozzo	Rieju	9	10	9	11					11	Ret			11	11	40
13	(Australia) Angus Riordan	KTM											1	2			37
14	(France) Dorian Simon	Fantic							4	9					14	10	28
15	(Chile) Camilo Herrera	Gas Gas							5	3							26
16	(France) Mathis Juillard	Kawasaki													10	7	15
17	(Czech Republic) Zdeněk Pitel	Husqvarna					10	9									13
18	(United Kingdom) Ben Clark	Beta											11	9			12
19	(Czech Republic) Tomáš Holý	Husqvarna	11	12	13	Ret			Ret	Ret							12
20	(New Zealand) Ryan Hayward	KTM											13	8			11
21	(United Kingdom) Sion Evans	Fantic											10	11			11
22	(France) Evan Raffard	Sherco			12	10											10
23	(Slovakia) Patrik Ficel	Gas Gas									12	11					9
24	(Italy) Giulio Nava	KTM							12	12							8
25	(Italy) Nicola Salvini	Gas Gas													13	13	6
26	(Spain) Jan Olivera	Husqvarna	Ret	11													5
27	(France) Theo Bencheikh	KTM													15	Ret	1
Pos	Rider	Bike	POR (Portugal)		POR (Portugal)		ROM (Romania)		ITA (Italy)		SVK (Slovakia)		GBR (United Kingdom)		FRA (France)		Points

== Youth ==
All riders competing in the Youth world championship must be younger than 21 years of age on 1 January of the year of the championship.

Only 2-stroke motorcycles between 100cc-125cc can be used.

=== Participants ===
Youth Riders
Team	Constructor	No	Rider	Rounds
CEC Racing	Yamaha	21	(Sweden) Sebastian Olsen	4
CEC Racing	KTM	74	(Sweden) Alfred Karlsson	3–4
Costa Ligure TM Youth Team	TM	32	(Italy) Alberto Elgari	1–5
Costa Ligure TM Youth Team	TM	46	(Italy) Gabriele Giordano	4, 6–7
Fantic Racing Junior Enduro Team	Fantic	37	(Italy) Valentino Corsi	1, 7
Fantic Racing Junior Enduro Team	Fantic	83	(Italy) Pietro Scardina	All
Fantic Racing Junior Enduro Team	Fantic	88	(Italy) Riccardo Pasquato	4–7
Sherco Academy France	Sherco	60	(Belgium) Hugo Vukcevic	1–4, 6–7
Sherco Academy France	Sherco	140	(France) Romain Dagna	All
Sherco Academy France	Sherco	201	(France) Armand Rouquette	7
Sherco Academy France	Sherco	208	(France) Benjamin Sicard	4
JET Zanardo Racing Team	Husqvarna	63	(Italy) Luca Colorio	All
Yamaha Johansson MPE	Yamaha	77	(Spain) Aleix Saumell	All
RFME Spain National Team	Sherco	81	(Spain) Yago Domínguez	All
RFME Spain National Team	Beta	104	(Spain) Alex Puey	All
RFME Spain National Team	Sherco	124	(Spain) Alfredo Pellicer	All
Beta Entrophy Team	Beta	84	(Finland) Juho Ahokas	2–7
Beta Entrophy Team	Beta	121	(Italy) Luca Piersigilli	1–4, 6
Osellini Team	Husqvarna	87	(Slovakia) Tomáš Merašicky	1–4
Team KTM Pro Racing Sport	KTM	90	(Italy) Manuel Verzeroli	1–6
Atomic Moto	Beta	106	(France) Maxime Clauzier	All
Atomic Moto	Beta	108	(France) Clement Clauzier	All
Atomic Moto	Beta	132	(France) Valentin Mersin	4–7
Factory Image Racing	KTM	126	(United Kingdom) Samuel Hughes	All
WP Eric Augé	KTM	144	(Spain) Raúl Sánchez	1–2, 6–7
Sherco Portugal/Moto Dreams	Sherco	145	(Portugal) Francisco Leite	1–4, 7
SE Team	Yamaha	150	(Finland) Tiitus Enjala	1–4, 6
Fantic Enduro Academy	Fantic	174	(Spain) Liam Sanjuan	1–2, 5, 7
	Beta	201	(Italy) Davide Accomo	4
Belin Racing	Fantic	202	(Sweden) Theo Hoff	4
Team Bonneton2Roues	Fantic	203	(France) Matteo Arrieta	4, 7
Yamaha Offroad Experience	Yamaha	221	(United Kingdom) Endaf Hughes	6
	Husqvarna	223	(Italy) Elia Zucconi	4
Elite Moto 15 Enduro Team	KTM	234	(France) Gabin Allemand	1, 3–4, 7
AlexMX Parts	KTM	245	(France) Léo Lavesvre	7
E.T. James Motorcycles	Gas Gas	269	(United Kingdom) Rees Jones	6
	TM	271	(Italy) Mirko Angeretti	5
	Fantic	287	(Italy) Cosimo Pratesi	4, 7
Dafy Enduro Team	KTM	288	(France) Diego Foucher	7

=== Riders Championship ===
Pos	Rider	Bike	POR (Portugal)		POR (Portugal)		ROM (Romania)		ITA (Italy)		SVK (Slovakia)		GBR (United Kingdom)		FRA (France)		Points
1	(Italy) Manuel Verzeroli	KTM	4	2	1	1	2	7	1	2	1	1	2	1			210
2	(Italy) Pietro Scardina	Fantic	7	7	4	3	3	2	4	4	5	3	3	3	1	1	200
3	(France) Romain Dagna	Sherco	1	6	2	4	Ret	5	3	5	2	2	1	2	DSQ	2	185
4	(France) Clement Clauzier	Beta	3	3	8	7	4	4	7	6	6	4	4	4	12	Ret	145
5	(Italy) Luca Colorio	Husqvarna	5	5	7	12	Ret	DNS	2	1	3	5	7	5	11	3	138
6	(Italy) Alberto Elgari	TM	6	1	3	2	1	1	Ret	3	4	Ret					130
7	(Spain) Alex Puey	Beta	11	10	5	6	6	3	6	11	10	Ret	5	6	3	6	124
8	(France) Maxime Clauzier	Beta	2	4	6	5	5	Ret	5	9	Ret	DNS	6	7	8	4	120
9	(United Kingdom) Samuel Hughes	KTM	9	8	16	15	10	12	11	13	7	11	19	10	4	13	70
10	(France) Gabin Allemand	KTM	8	Ret			8	8	9	8					2	7	65
11	(Spain) Aleix Saumell	Yamaha	Ret	16	12	8	9	9	14	17	12	9	8	Ret	6	8	65
12	(Spain) Yago Domínguez	Sherco	10	Ret	10	10	15	DNS	13	14	Ret	8	10	8	5	12	61
13	(Italy) Riccardo Pasquato	Fantic							12	10	8	6	11	9	7	11	54
14	(Italy) Luca Piersigilli	Beta	14	11	13	9	7	6	10	Ret			14	12			48
15	(France) Valentin Mersin	Beta							15	7	11	10	9	11	9	17	40
16	(Spain) Alfredo Pellicer	Sherco	15	12	15	Ret	11	Ret	Ret	12	9	7	15	13	16	Ret	35
17	(Finland) Tiitus Enjala	Yamaha	12	Ret	11	11	12	10	Ret	DNS			13	20			27
18	(Spain) Raúl Sánchez	KTM	Ret	DNS	9	14							12	15	Ret	5	25
19	(Italy) Valentino Corsi	Fantic	13	9											10	14	18
20	(Finland) Juho Ahokas	Beta			17	Ret	Ret	Ret	17	15	13	12	Ret	14	14	18	12
21	(Portugal) Francisco Leite	Sherco	16	13	Ret	Ret	13	11	Ret	DNS					20	Ret	11
22	(France) Armand Rouquette	Sherco													13	10	9
23	(France) Matteo Arrieta	Fantic							8	18					Ret	Ret	8
24	(France) Diego Foucher	KTM													Ret	9	7
25	(Spain) Liam Sanjuan	Fantic	17	Ret	14	13					15	DNS			15	16	7
26	(Slovakia) Tomáš Merašicky	Husqvarna	19	15	18	16	14	13	20	22							6
27	(Italy) Mirko Angeretti	TM									14	13					5
28	(Belgium) Hugo Vukcevic	Sherco	18	14	19	17	Ret	14	Ret	23			Ret	19	18	20	4
29	(France) Léo Lavesvre	KTM													17	15	1
30	(Sweden) Alfred Karlsson	KTM					16	15	22	Ret							1
	(France) Benjamin Sicard	Sherco							16	16							0
	(Italy) Gabriele Giordano	TM							Ret	21			17	16	19	19	0
	(United Kingdom) Endaf Hughes	Yamaha											16	18			0
	(United Kingdom) Rees Jones	Gas Gas											18	17			0
	(Sweden) Sebastian Olsen	Yamaha							18	20							0
	(Italy) Cosimo Pratesi	Fantic							21	19					Ret	Ret	0
	(Italy) Elia Zucconi	Husqvarna							19	24							0
	(Sweden) Theo Hoff	Fantic							23	26							0
	(Italy) Davide Accomo	Beta							24	25							0
Pos	Rider	Bike	POR (Portugal)		POR (Portugal)		ROM (Romania)		ITA (Italy)		SVK (Slovakia)		GBR (United Kingdom)		FRA (France)		Points

== Women ==
Competitors in the Women's world championship can compete on any capacity of motorcycle of their choosing.

=== Participants ===
Riders
Team	Constructor	No	Rider	Rounds
Kiwi's Bike Shop Racing Team	Sherco	404	(United Kingdom) Nieve Holmes	1–2, 4–5
Kiwi's Bike Shop Racing Team	Sherco	413	(United States) Rachel Gutish	All
Factory Image Racing	KTM	408	(United Kingdom) Zoe Zembrzuski	4
CEC Racing/Sherco Sweden	Sherco	414	(Sweden) Emelie Borg Nilsson	1–3
Rieju Factory Team	Rieju	416	(United Kingdom) Rosie Rowett	All
Rieju Factory Team	Rieju	432	(Spain) Mireia Badia	All
Osellini Team	Husqvarna	418	(Argentina) Carla Scaglioni	3
Atomic Moto	Beta	420	(France) Elodie Chaplot	All
Atomic Moto	Beta	495	(France) Justine Martel	All
WPM Motors	KTM	422	(Norway) Vilde Holt	All
Rogers Hill Raceway	Beta	428	(United Kingdom) Emily Hall	4
XMotors Rieju Vallés Store	Rieju	429	(Spain) Maria San Miguel	5
Honda Racing RedMoto Enduro Team	Honda	443	(Italy) Francesca Nocera	1–3
Tett Racing	Gas Gas	444	(United Kingdom) Elizabeth Tett	5

=== Riders Championship ===
Pos	Rider	Bike	POR (Portugal)		POR (Portugal)		ITA (Italy)		GBR (United Kingdom)		FRA (France)		Points
1	(Spain) Mireia Badia	Rieju	3	1	2	1	1	1	1	1	2	6	179
2	(United States) Rachel Gutish	Sherco	1	2	8	3	2	Ret	4	2	1	1	147
3	(United Kingdom) Rosie Rowett	Rieju	2	6	3	4	4	2	2	4	3	3	145
4	(France) Elodie Chaplot	Beta	6	4	6	6	3	3	3	7	4	4	123
5	(France) Justine Martel	Beta	7	8	5	5	5	4	6	6	5	5	105
6	(Norway) Vilde Holt	KTM	5	5	Ret	DNS	6	6	7	5	6	2	89
7	(United Kingdom) Nieve Holmes	Sherco	4	7	4	8			5	3	7	Ret	78
8	(Italy) Francesca Nocera	Honda	8	3	1	2	Ret	DNS					60
9	(Sweden) Emelie Borg Nilsson	Sherco	9	9	7	7	7	5					52
10	(Spain) Maria San Miguel	Rieju									8	7	17
11	(United Kingdom) Emily Hall	Beta							8	8			16
12	(United Kingdom) Zoe Zembrzuski	KTM							9	9			14
13	(United Kingdom) Elizabeth Tett	Gas Gas									Ret	8	8
	(Argentina) Carla Scaglioni	Husqvarna					Ret	DNS					0
Pos	Rider	Bike	POR (Portugal)		POR (Portugal)		ITA (Italy)		GBR (United Kingdom)		FRA (France)		Points

== Open World Cup ==
=== Participants ===
Open 2-stroke Riders
Team	Constructor	No	Rider	Rounds
John Shirt Motorcycles	Gas Gas	501	(United Kingdom) Henry Harman	4, 6
	Gas Gas	504	(Italy) Lorenzo Moreti	4
	KTM	504	(France) Florian Furtado	7
Team Gailland Sport	KTM	505	(Switzerland) Loris Gailland	4
Team Gailland Sport	KTM	506	(Switzerland) Michael Besse	4
Team Gailland Sport	KTM	541	(Switzerland) Kélian Michaud	4, 7
Team GP Motors	Beta	506	(France) Clément Daussat-Daure	7
	Beta	507	(Switzerland) Arnaud Pasquier	7
	TM	508	(Germany) Max Schäfer	3–5
Jarsen Enduro Team	Sherco	512	(Czech Republic) Jiri Hadek	3–6
	Sherco	513	(Czech Republic) Jan Matějka	5
Beta Motor France/JLD2Roues	Beta	515	(France) Logan Merlier	1–2, 4–7
Horsepower84 Motos	KTM	516	(Belgium) Nathan Verheyen	7
Team Vertigo	Gas Gas	518	(Italy) Kevyn Scarpenti	4
	Gas Gas	519	(Czech Republic) Filip Fiala	5
	KTM	520	(Czech Republic) Jan Matějka	5
	Husqvarna	521	(France) Thomas Chiarisoli	7
	Husqvarna	522	(Italy) Edoardo Milani	4
Calzados Diaz Lopez	KTM	522	(Spain) Jordi Galera	7
	Beta	523	(France) Alexandre Levet	7
Elite Moto 15 Enduro Team	KTM	525	(France) Yann Dupic	7
	KTM	526	(Romania) Pavel Olaru	3
Osellini Team	Husqvarna	528	(Chile) Carlos González	4
Czech Enduro Team	Husqvarna	528	(Czech Republic) Tomáš Holý	5
	Fantic	529	(Italy) Tiziano Malvermi	4
	Husqvarna	530	(Italy) Roberto Acri	4
QBG Racing Sherco	Sherco	530	(United Kingdom) Ben Thomson	7
KTM Team Pro Racing Sport	KTM	533	(Italy) Mattia Ferrari	4
KTM Team Pro Racing Sport	KTM	551	(Sweden) Robin Wiss	3–5
	KTM	539	(Switzerland) Alexandre Vaudan	4, 7
KTM Switzerland	KTM	540	(Switzerland) Steve Erzer	4, 7
Sherco Academy France	Sherco	542	(Belgium) Tim Louis	All
	Beta	543	(France) Enzo Gros	7
	Fantic	545	(Slovakia) Martin Hodas	5
Tech36 Racing Team	KTM	554	(Italy) Daniele Matti	4
	KTM	555	(Hungary) István Jäger	5
Beta Entrophy Team	Beta	557	(Germany) Samantha Buhmann	4
	Yamaha	559	(Slovakia) Alex Zuberský	5
	Beta	581	(Germany) Stefan Staudacher	4
Maxxess Clermont	Husqvarna	585	(France) Loup Becker	7
Szanki Motor SE	Sherco	591	(Hungary) Dániel Tádics	5
WP Eric Augé	KTM	593	(Israel) Inbar Selinger	1–3, 5–6
John Lee Motorcycles/Beta UK	Beta	594	(United Kingdom) Ross Danby	6
	Beta	596	(Germany) Tim Apolle	4–7
	Beta	599	(Germany) Eddie Findling	4–7
Open 4-stroke Riders
Team	Constructor	No	Rider	Rounds
	KTM	602	(France) Iban Etchegoimberry	7
Team Beluga	Husqvarna	603	(Italy) Riccardo Mazzulla	4
Bodro Team	KTM	604	(Czech Republic) Marek Borák	5
Dafy Moto Bayonne/Igoa Moto	Husqvarna	606	(France) Franck Luberriaga	1–2, 4–7
TNT Squadra Corse KTM	KTM	608	(Italy) Edgardo Paganini	4
	Husqvarna	609	(Italy) Alberto Guglielmetti	4
	Honda	610	(Italy) Luca Raggi	4
Autonet Motorcycle Team	KTM	611	(Romania) Emanuel Gyenes	3
Yamaha Racing Switzerland	Yamaha	612	(Switzerland) Jonathan Rosse	7
	KTM	613	(United Kingdom) Rhys Evans	6
Sissi Racing	Gas Gas	615	(Italy) Robert Malanchini	4
	Honda	616	(Italy) Stefano Gotti	4
	Gas Gas	616	(United Kingdom) Will Keenan	6
	KTM	618	(France) Stéphane Autuori	7
	KTM	620	(Italy) Simone Ferretti	4
AZ Pneu Moto Team	KTM	621	(Czech Republic) Ondrej Stupka	5
Motor Race	Gas Gas	624	(Italy) Riccardo Nicoli	4
	KTM	626	(Italy) Davide Ferretti	4
Team Bonneton2Roues	Fantic	626	(France) Charles Cottet	7
Team Bonneton2Roues	Fantic	669	(France) Jules Kalkias	7
	Yamaha	627	(France) Nathan Corny	7
	KTM	630	(Germany) Alexander Schmid	4
John Shirt Motorcycles	Gas Gas	633	(United Kingdom) Alfie Webb	1–2, 4–7
John Shirt Motorcycles	Gas Gas	681	(United Kingdom) Henry Harman	7
SRP Suspension	Gas Gas	634	(Netherlands) Wesley Pittens	6
	Gas Gas	637	(France) Andy Danglard	7
SGS Racing Enduro	Beta	640	(Italy) Lorenzo Staccioli	4–7
	Gas Gas	655	(Netherlands) Wesley Harmelink	2
	Husqvarna	655	(Italy) Nicola Lanza	4
	Kawasaki	655	(France) Jason Clermont	7
Andre Motors Husqvarna Nederland	Husqvarna	656	(Netherlands) Kaiya Brouwer	1–2, 6
	TM	657	(Italy) Tiziano Interno	4
	KTM	660	(Switzerland) Luc Hunziker	4, 7
CF Racing	Gas Gas	660	(United Kingdom) Gethin Humphreys	6
To Enduro Team/CBO Group Beta	Beta	661	(France) Alex Pichaud	1–2, 6–7
	Honda	662	(Switzerland) Silvan Ming	4
	Husqvarna	672	(Italy) Mattia Traversi	4
Steve Plain Motorcycles	Beta	676	(United Kingdom) Kris Price	6
	KTM	677	(Belgium) Dorian Tourneur	7
	Fantic	679	(Italy) Matteo Bresolin	4, 7
CEC Racing	KTM	682	(Sweden) Arvid Karlsson	3–4
	Husqvarna	685	(Italy) Nicoló Bussandri	4
	Gas Gas	688	(United Kingdom) Joel Tett	1–2, 4, 6
	Gas Gas	689	(United Kingdom) Freddie Davis	4, 6
Sturm Racing	KTM	695	(Germany) Phillip Görner	4
Honda RedMoto Karlik Poznań	Honda	696	(Poland) Rafał Bracik	5

=== Open 2-stroke ===
Open 2-Stroke is for 2-stroke motorcycles of any engine capacity.

Pos	Rider	Bike	POR (Portugal)		POR (Portugal)		ROM (Romania)		ITA (Italy)		SVK (Slovakia)		GBR (United Kingdom)		FRA (France)		Points
1	(Belgium) Tim Louis	Sherco	1	1	1	1	1	3	1	2	1	3	2	5	2	2	157
2	(Czech Republic) Jiri Hadek	Sherco					2	1	5	1	2	1	4	2			135
3	(Israel) Inbar Selinger	KTM	2	2	2	2	3	2			4	5	5	4			126
4	(Germany) Tim Apolle	Beta							4	3	3	2	3	3	3	5	116
5	(France) Logan Merlier	Beta	3	3	3	3			17	12	11	12	8	7	16	18	86
6	(Sweden) Robin Wiss	KTM					4	Ret	7	5	7	8					50
7	(Switzerland) Kélian Michaud	KTM							3	4					5	6	49
8	(Germany) Eddie Findling	Beta							13	10	9	9	7	6	13	13	48
9	(France) Yann Dupic	KTM													1	1	40
10	(United Kingdom) Ross Danby	Beta											1	1			40
11	(Germany) Max Schäfer	TM					5	4	18	14	10	10					38
12	(Switzerland) Alexandre Vaudan	KTM							6	7					6	9	36
13	(Italy) Daniele Matti	KTM							2	8							25
14	(Hungary) Dániel Tádics	Sherco									5	4					24
15	(United Kingdom) Henry Harman	Gas Gas							12	6			6	Ret			24
16	(Switzerland) Steve Erzer	KTM							8	11					10	12	23
17	(Spain) Jordi Galera	KTM													7	4	22
18	(France) Clément Daussat-Daure	Beta													4	8	21
19	(Romania) Pavel Olaru	KTM					6	5									21
20	(Czech Republic) Filip Fiala	Gas Gas									6	6					20
21	(United Kingdom) Ben Thomson	Sherco													8	7	17
22	(Czech Republic) Tomáš Holý	Husqvarna									8	7					20
23	(France) Florian Furtado	KTM													17	3	15
24	(Switzerland) Loris Gailland	KTM							9	9							14
25	(France) Alexandre Levet	Beta													9	10	13
26	(Italy) Edoardo Milani	Husqvarna							11	13							8
27	(Italy) Kevyn Scarpenti	Gas Gas							10	15							7
28	(Belgium) Nathan Verheyen	KTM													14	11	7
29	(France) Loup Becker	Husqvarna													11	14	7
30	(Czech Republic) Jan Matějka	Sherco									13	13					6
31	(France) Thomas Chiarisoli	Husqvarna													12	15	5
32	(Czech Republic) Jan Matějka	KTM									Ret	11					5
33	(Slovakia) Martin Hodas	Fantic									12	Ret					4
34	(Switzerland) Michael Besse	KTM							14	16							2
35	(France) Enzo Gros	Beta													15	17	1
36	(Chile) Carlos González	Husqvarna							15	Ret							1
	(Italy) Lorenzo Moreti	Gas Gas							16	17							0
	(Switzerland) Arnaud Pasquier	Beta													18	16	0
	(Italy) Mattia Ferrari	KTM							19	18							0
	(Italy) Roberto Acri	Husqvarna							20	19							0
	(Germany) Stefan Staudacher	Beta							21	Ret							0
	(Germany) Samantha Buhmann	Beta							22	Ret							0
	(Hungary) István Jäger	KTM									Ret	Ret					0
	(Italy) Tiziano Malvermi	Fantic							Ret	DNS							0
	(Slovakia) Alex Zuberský	Yamaha									Ret	DNS					0
Pos	Rider	Bike	POR (Portugal)		POR (Portugal)		ROM (Romania)		ITA (Italy)		SVK (Slovakia)		GBR (United Kingdom)		FRA (France)		Points

=== Open 4-stroke ===
Open 4-Stroke is for 4-stroke motorcycles of any engine capacity.

Pos	Rider	Bike	POR (Portugal)		POR (Portugal)		ROM (Romania)		ITA (Italy)		SVK (Slovakia)		GBR (United Kingdom)		FRA (France)		Points
1	(United Kingdom) Alfie Webb	Gas Gas	1	1	1	1			3	1	1	1	1	1	4	4	160
2	(France) Alex Pichaud	Beta	4	2	2	2							3	4	3	3	122
3	(France) Franck Luberriaga	Husqvarna	2	3	4	3			11	10	4	4	9	8	Ret	DNS	101
4	(United Kingdom) Joel Tett	Gas Gas	5	5	5	4			14	9			7	9			71
5	(Netherlands) Kaiya Brouwer	Husqvarna	3	4	3	Ret							5	7			63
6	(Sweden) Arvid Karlsson	KTM					1	1	6	5							61
7	(Italy) Lorenzo Staccioli	Beta							7	7	5	6	8	10	10	DNS	59
8	(France) Stéphane Autuori	KTM													1	1	40
9	(Italy) Riccardo Nicoli	Gas Gas							1	3							35
10	(United Kingdom) Gethin Humphreys	Gas Gas											2	2			34
11	(Czech Republic) Marek Borák	KTM									2	2					34
12	(Romania) Emanuel Gyenes	KTM					2	2									34
13	(Italy) Robert Malanchini	Gas Gas							4	2							30
14	(Italy) Mattia Traversi	Husqvarna							2	4							30
15	(Poland) Rafał Bracik	Honda									3	3					30
16	(Netherlands) Wesley Pittens	Gas Gas											4	3			28
17	(Switzerland) Luc Hunziker	Beta							8	14					5	9	28
18	(Italy) Matteo Bresolin	Fantic							19	DNS					2	7	26
19	(United Kingdom) Kris Price	Beta											6	5			21
20	(Czech Republic) Ondrej Stupka	KTM									6	5					21
21	(Italy) Edgardo Paganini	KTM							5	6							21
22	(France) Andy Danglard	Gas Gas													8	5	19
23	(Switzerland) Jonathan Rosse	Yamaha													Ret	2	17
24	(France) Charles Cottet	Fantic													9	6	17
25	(Belgium) Dorian Tourneur	KTM													6	11	15
26	(Italy) Davide Ferretti	KTM							10	8							14
27	(United Kingdom) Henry Harman	Gas Gas													7	12	13
28	(France) Jason Clermont	Kawasaki													12	8	12
29	(Italy) Luca Raggi	Honda							9	11							12
30	(United Kingdom) Rhys Evans	KTM											10	11			11
31	(United Kingdom) Will Keenan	Gas Gas											Ret	6			10
32	(United Kingdom) Freddie Davis	Gas Gas							23	19			11	12			9
33	(France) Iban Etchegoimberry	KTM													11	13	8
24	(Italy) Simone Ferretti	KTM							13	12							7
35	(Italy) Nicolo Bussandri	Husqvarna							12	13							7
36	(France) Jules Kalkias	Fantic													Ret	10	6
37	(Italy) Nicola Lanza	Husqvarna							17	15							1
38	(Germany) Alexander Schmid	KTM							15	16							1
	(Italy) Stefano Gotti	Honda							16	17							0
	(Italy) Riccardo Mazzulla	Husqvarna							18	18							0
	(Germany) Phillip Görner	KTM							24	20							0
	(Switzerland) Silvan Ming	Honda							20	DNS							0
	(Italy) Alberto Guglielmetti	Husqvarna							21	21							0
	(Italy) Tiziano Interno	TM							22	Ret							0
	(Netherlands) Wesley Harmelink	Gas Gas			Ret	DNS											0
	(France) Nathan Corny	Yamaha													Ret	DNS	0
Pos	Rider	Bike	POR (Portugal)		POR (Portugal)		ROM (Romania)		ITA (Italy)		SVK (Slovakia)		GBR (United Kingdom)		FRA (France)		Points
