= Josep García =

Spanish enduro racer

- Nationality: Spanish
- Born: 22 December 1996 (age 29); Súria
- Current team: Red Bull KTM Factory Racing
- Bike number: 1

Josep García i Montaña (born 22 December 1996) is a Spanish professional Enduro racer. García is a nine-time FIM Enduro World Champion, winning titles from 2017 to 2026. Since 2017, García has competed for the Red Bull KTM Factory Racing team.

García has taken four individual overall victories at the International Six Days Enduro. He also has nine class wins at the event.

Within his World Championship count, García has won the overall EnduroGP title three times, the Enduro1 class title four times and the Enduro2 class title twice.

García has also been a dominant force in the Spanish Enduro Championship, winning seven overall titles, alongside five in the E1 class and 3 in the E2 class.

== Career ==
With a family background in motorcycling, García competed in several disciplines before his enduro career. Starting off in motocross, he also tried his hand at short circuit racing, getting as far as competing in the 2011 Red Bull MotoGP Rookies Cup.

After focussing his career on Enduro, García took his first Spanish national titles in 2014, when he won the Junior and 125cc crowns. He competed in his first International Six Days Enduro for Spain in 2014, forming part of the team that finished third in the main World Trophy category. In 2015, García finished runner-up in the Youth class of the Enduro World Championship. After moving into the Junior class in 2016, he would end third in the Junior Enduro World Championship. Alongside this, García won his first senior Spanish title during the same season, taking the crown in the E1 class. He took his first individual overall class win at the ISDE in 2016, winning the E1 class overall despite riding the event as part of the Spanish Junior Trophy Team, rather than the World Trophy team.

García began his tenure with the Red Bull KTM Factory Racing Team in 2017, where he would take his first World Championship in the E2 class. He repeated the victory in the E1 class of the ISDE (held in Brive, Occitania), this time combined with the absolute victory as the best individual rider across all classes. With the KTM group leaving the FIM Enduro World Championship for the newly formed World Enduro Super Series, García did not defend his first world title. Instead he finished fourth in the final standings of the WESS, winning the round held at Hawkstone Park. He rounded off the season with the title of Spanish champion in the E1 and overall classes. The following season, although he dropped to sixth place in the WESS, he achieved two victories at the Enduro BR2 in Solsona and the Trèfle Lozérien Classic Enduro, where under difficult conditions he became the first non-French winner in the 33-year history of the race. He also achieved his third individual victory in the E1 class of the ISDE and defending his E1 and Overall titles in the Spanish championship.

During the COVID-19 pandemic-impacted 2020 season, García made his return to the FIM Enduro World Championship, winning the two final rounds held in Portugal. He again took two titles in the Spanish Championship, this time in the E2 class individually and the Overall. The following year, García moved back to the World Enduro Championship full-time, becoming world champion again in the E2 class and finishing runner-up behind Brad Freeman in the overall EnduroGP standings. He finished the season with his usual double Spanish championship (Overall and E2) and the individual victory in the E2 class of the ISDE. After missing a round mid-season, García finished runner-up in the 2022 FIM Enduro World Championship, in both the EnduroGP and E2 classes. He continued to be dominant in his native Spain, winning the same two titles as the year before. García matched these titles in the ISDE, where he won the individual overall and the E2 class individually, as the Spanish team finished third in the World Trophy classification.

Returning to the E1 class for the 2023 season, García was able to win the class world title in the 2023 FIM Enduro World Championship, once again finishing a runner-up in the overall EnduroGP classification. He picked up the E1 and Overall titles in the Spanish Championship and again proved to be the best individual rider at the ISDE, both overall as well as in the E1 class. García managed to finally claim the overall EnduroGP title during the 2024 FIM Enduro World Championship, pairing this with the E1 crown. He carried on his run of double titles in the Spanish Championship, as well as the overall win in the ISDE. The 2025 FIM Enduro World Championship saw García successfully defend his titles in the EnduroGP and E1 classes as well as once again taking the individual overall win at the ISDE, his fourth consecutive win at the event.

The 2026 FIM Enduro World Championship saw García make it three EnduroGP titles in a row, as he became world champion by nearly sixty points over Andrea Verona. Alongside this, he again won the E1 class title, recording a perfect season in the class by winning each event. Despite Spain finishing down the order as a team, García was again able to take the E1 win at the ISDE.

== Honours ==
Enduro World Championship

- EnduroGP: 2024, 2025 & 2026 (gold)
- Enduro 1: 2023, 2024, 2025 & 2026 (gold)
- Enduro 2: 2017 & 2021 (gold)

International Six Days Enduro

- Individual Overall: 2022, 2023, 2024 & 2025 (gold)
- Enduro 1 Overall: 2016, 2017, 2019, 2023, 2024, 2025 & 2026 (gold)
- Enduro 2 Overall: 2021 & 2022 (gold)

Spanish Enduro Championship

- Overall: 2018, 2019, 2020, 2021, 2022, 2023 & 2024 (gold)
- Enduro 1: 2016, 2018, 2019, 2023 & 2024 (gold)
- Enduro 2: 2020, 2021 & 2022 (gold)
