= 2023 FIM Enduro World Championship =

2023 world enduro championship season

The 2023 World Enduro Championship is the 34th season of the FIM World Enduro Championship. The season consists of seven events.

Andrea Verona goes into the championship after winning both the EnduroGP and Enduro 1 classes in 2022. Wil Ruprecht is the reigning Enduro 2 champion, with Brad Freeman going into the season after taking the Enduro 3 title the previous season.

== Calendar ==
A seven-round calendar was announced in November 2022.

Round	Event	Location	Dates
1	Italy	Sanremo	31 March–2 April
2	Spain	Lalín	5–7 May
3	Finland	Heinola	26–28 May
4	Sweden	Skövde	1–3 June
5	Slovakia	Gelnica	30 June–2 July
6	Portugal	Valpaços	29 September–1 October
7	Portugal	Santo André	6–8 October

== EnduroGP ==
=== Riders Championship ===
Pos	Rider	Bike	Class	ITA (Italy)		ESP (Spain)		FIN (Finland)		SWE (Sweden)		SVK (Slovakia)		POR (Portugal)		POR (Portugal)		Points
1	(United Kingdom) Steve Holcombe	Beta	Enduro 2	3	3	3	3	2	3	3	1	1	2	3	2	3	5	222
2	(Spain) Josep García	KTM	Enduro 1	6	4	2	2	3	1	1	Ret	8	6	1	1	1	1	210
3	(Italy) Andrea Verona	Gas Gas	Enduro 2	2	2	4	4	5	4	5	4	2	1	2	3	2	3	209
4	(United Kingdom) Brad Freeman	Beta	Enduro 3	1	1	1	1	1	2	2	2	Ret	DNS	12	9	9	17	169
5	(New Zealand) Hamish MacDonald	Sherco	Enduro 2	5	5	5	10	4	5	6	8	5	3	7	5	7	9	143
6	(United Kingdom) Nathan Watson	Honda	Enduro 2	Ret	6	8	5	14	8	4	3	9	16	8	4	6	2	122
7	(France) Zach Pichon	Sherco	Enduro 1	4	11	7	Ret	7	9	7	6	13	14	4	6	8	6	108
8	(France) Theophile Espinasse	Beta	Enduro 1	9	9	Ret	8	6	6	8	5	4	7	9	10	12	13	103
9	(United Kingdom) Jamie McCanney	Husqvarna	Enduro 1	12	20	12	11	10	16	9	11	6	5	6	7	4	4	97
10	(Sweden) Mikael Persson	Husqvarna	Enduro 3	7	7	10	14	9	7	16	15	7	4	13	11	11	8	86
11	(Italy) Samuele Bernardini	Honda	Enduro 2	11	13	20	16	25	31	11	7	12	8	5	14	5	7	67
12	(Italy) Matteo Cavallo	TM	Enduro 3	8	12	11	9	8	14	13	9	15	Ret	Ret	DNS			45
13	(Belgium) Antoine Magain	Sherco	Enduro 3	15	10	17	6	13	10	15	16	14	9			21	11	41
14	(Australia) Daniel Milner	TM	Enduro 2	14	14	9	12	33	13	17	20	Ret	DNS	10	8	10	14	40
15	(Australia) Wil Ruprecht	Sherco	Enduro 2	27	27	14	7	11	20	27	31	3	15					32
16	(Italy) Matteo Pavoni	TM	Enduro 1	16	18	6	15	15	15	19	13	10	10	15	17	15	Ret	30
17	(Italy) Thomas Oldrati	Honda	Enduro 1	10	8	13	19	16	11	30	17							22
18	(Germany) Luca Fischeder	Sherco	Enduro 3	24	Ret	15	13	17	12	24	12	11	Ret					17
19	(France) Christophe Charlier	Husqvarna	Enduro 3	13	17	Ret	DNS							16	12	13	10	16
20	(Italy) Morgan Lesiardo	Sherco	Enduro 3	18	19	22	20	21	17	12	10	24	17	21	13	23	24	13
21	(Sweden) Albin Elowson	Husqvarna	Enduro 2					12	28	10	14							12
22	(Spain) Jaume Betriu	KTM	Enduro 3	23	25	19	21	Ret	DNS	28	Ret	23	22	11	15	14	16	8
23	(Finland) Roni Kytönen	Honda	Enduro 1	19	15	28	Ret	28	19	14	24	18	12	20	19	18	21	7
24	(France) Luc Fargier	Beta	Enduro 3	30	26	16	17	19	18	31	28	26	11	Ret	16	16	19	5
25	(Spain) Marc Sans	Yamaha	Enduro 2	42	31	30	27	32	32	Ret	DNS	21	20	23	24	22	12	4
26	(Chile) Benjamín Herrera	Gas Gas	Enduro 3	20	16	Ret	24	23	24	20	21	16	13	24	20	17	18	3
27	(France) Julien Roussaly	Sherco	Enduro 3					18	21	18	18	22	Ret	14	DNS			2
28	(Italy) Lorenzo Macoritto	Fantic	Enduro 3	29	22	18	23	34	26	25	27	Ret	Ret	19	18	Ret	15	1
Pos	Rider	Bike	Class	ITA (Italy)		ESP (Spain)		FIN (Finland)		SWE (Sweden)		SVK (Slovakia)		POR (Portugal)		POR (Portugal)		Points

=== Enduro 1 ===
Enduro 1 is for motorcycles up to and including 250cc, both 2-stroke and 4-stroke.

Team	Constructor	No	Rider	Rounds
MGR Racing Team	Sherco	10	(Italy) Davide Soreca	1–5
Honda Racing Brazil/Honda RedMoto	Honda	11	(Brazil) Bruno Crivilin	All
Team Beta Oxmoto	Beta	17	(France) Theophile Espinasse	All
Honda RedMoto World Enduro Team	Honda	19	(Finland) Roni Kytönen	All
Honda RedMoto World Enduro Team	Honda	22	(Italy) Thomas Oldrati	1–4
Red Bull KTM Factory Racing	KTM	26	(Spain) Josep García	All
Team KTM GST Berlin	KTM	48	(Germany) Edward Hübner	3–4
Beta Entrophy Team	Beta	58	(Finland) Hermanni Haljala	1–5
Atomic Moto	Husqvarna	64	(France) Anthony Geslin	1–2, 5
Fast Eddy Racing Team	Husqvarna	68	(United Kingdom) Jamie McCanney	All
Fast Eddy Racing Team	Husqvarna	118	(United Kingdom) Jack Edmondson	1–2, 6–7
KTM Team Pro Racing Sport	KTM	78	(Italy) Carlo Minot	1–2
TM Boano Factory Team	TM	98	(Italy) Matteo Pavoni	All
Sherco Factory Racing	Sherco	101	(France) Zach Pichon	All
	Gas Gas	222	(Spain) Samuel Obradó	2
WPM KTM	KTM	224	(Netherlands) Tommie Jochems	4
Team Bloms MX Racing	KTM	225	(Sweden) Alexander Gunnerheim	4
	KTM	278	(Sweden) Adam Fasth	3–4
	TM	284	(Italy) Luca Pavone	1
Solarys Racing	Husqvarna	286	(Italy) Matteo Segantini	1

=== Riders Championship ===
Pos	Rider	Bike	ITA (Italy)		ESP (Spain)		FIN (Finland)		SWE (Sweden)		SVK (Slovakia)		POR (Portugal)		POR (Portugal)		Points
1	(Spain) Josep García	KTM	2	1	1	1	1	1	1	Ret	3	2	1	1	1	1	249
2	(France) Theophile Espinasse	Beta	3	3	Ret	2	2	2	3	1	1	3	4	4	4	4	203
3	(United Kingdom) Jamie McCanney	Husqvarna	5	7	4	3	4	6	4	3	2	1	3	3	2	2	200
4	(France) Zach Pichon	Sherco	1	4	3	Ret	3	3	2	2	5	6	2	2	3	3	197
5	(Italy) Matteo Pavoni	TM	6	6	2	4	5	5	6	4	4	4	5	5	5	Ret	154
6	(Finland) Roni Kytönen	Honda	7	5	11	Ret	9	7	5	7	7	5	7	6	6	5	121
7	(Brazil) Bruno Crivilin	Honda	12	Ret	7	9	10	10	7	8	8	8	8	7	8	7	99
8	(Italy) Thomas Oldrati	Honda	4	2	5	5	6	4	9	5							93
9	(Italy) Davide Soreca	Sherco	8	8	8	8	7	8	10	9	6	7					81
10	(United Kingdom) Jack Edmondson	Husqvarna	10	10	6	7							6	Ret	7	6	60
11	(Finland) Hermanni Haljala	Beta	11	11	10	6	8	9	8	6	Ret	DNS					59
12	(France) Anthony Geslin	Husqvarna	9	9	9	Ret					9	Ret					28
13	(Sweden) Adam Fasth	KTM					12	12	12	10							18
14	(Germany) Edward Hübner	KTM					11	11	13	12							17
15	(Italy) Carlo Minot	KTM	Ret	12	12	10											14
16	(Sweden) Alexander Gunnerheim	KTM							11	11							10
17	(Spain) Samuel Obradó	Gas Gas			13	11											8
18	(Italy) Matteo Segantini	Husqvarna	13	13													6
19	(Netherlands) Tommie Jochems	KTM							14	13							5
20	(Italy) Luca Pavone	TM	Ret	14													2
Pos	Rider	Bike	ITA (Italy)		ESP (Spain)		FIN (Finland)		SWE (Sweden)		SVK (Slovakia)		POR (Portugal)		POR (Portugal)		Points

=== Enduro 2 ===
Enduro 2 is for 4-stroke motorcycles from 255cc-450cc.

Team	Constructor	No	Rider	Rounds
Yamaha Johansson MPE	Yamaha	2	(Spain) Marc Sans	All
TM Boano Factory Team	TM	5	(Australia) Daniel Milner	All
Sherco Factory Racing	Sherco	7	(Australia) Wil Ruprecht	1–5
Sherco Factory Racing	Sherco	76	(New Zealand) Hamish MacDonald	All
Honda RedMoto World Enduro Team	Honda	23	(Italy) Samuele Bernardini	All
Honda RedMoto World Enduro Team	Honda	91	(United Kingdom) Nathan Watson	All
WP Eric Augé KTM	KTM	29	(Argentina) Nicolas Kutulas	All
WP Eric Augé KTM	KTM	56	(France) Hugo Blanjoue	1–4
Beta Factory Enduro Team	Beta	70	(United Kingdom) Steve Holcombe	All
KTM Team Pro Racing Sport	KTM	88	(Norway) Kevin Burud	3–7
Gas Gas Factory Racing	Gas Gas	99	(Italy) Andrea Verona	All
KBS UAMK Team	Husqvarna	123	(Czech Republic) Kryštof Kouble	All
Husqvarna Factory Racing	Husqvarna	157	(United Kingdom) Billy Bolt	1
Beta Portugal	Beta	170	(Portugal) Renato Silva	1
Husqvarna Scandinavia	Husqvarna	195	(Sweden) Albin Elowson	3–4
PEK-KONE Kawasaki Racing	Kawasaki	205	(Finland) Ville Meisola	3
Cross Centeret Snellingen	Husqvarna	208	(Norway) Marcus Christensen	4
Team Lillemans MC	Yamaha	215	(Sweden) Franz Löfquist	4
Team Lillemans MC	Yamaha	227	(Sweden) Emil Löfquist	4
Team Triple One	Gas Gas	220	(Sweden) Lukas Printz	4
Team Bloms MX Racing	Husqvarna	222	(Sweden) Casper Lindholm	4
Beta Scandinavia NTEK Racing	Beta	229	(Sweden) Oskar Ljungström	4
	KTM	230	(Sweden) Oliver Nelson	4
MXFontaRacing Gas Gas Syneco	Gas Gas	243	(Italy) Gianluca Martini	1
SE Team	Honda	246	(Finland) Eemil Pohjola	3
	Husqvarna	264	(Italy) Alessio Bigiarini	1

=== Riders Championship ===
Pos	Rider	Bike	ITA (Italy)		ESP (Spain)		FIN (Finland)		SWE (Sweden)		SVK (Slovakia)		POR (Portugal)		POR (Portugal)		Points
1	(United Kingdom) Steve Holcombe	Beta	2	2	1	1	1	1	1	1	1	2	2	1	2	3	260
2	(Italy) Andrea Verona	Gas Gas	1	1	2	2	3	2	3	3	2	1	1	2	1	2	247
3	(New Zealand) Hamish MacDonald	Sherco	3	3	3	5	2	3	4	5	4	3	4	4	5	5	188
4	(United Kingdom) Nathan Watson	Honda	Ret	4	4	3	6	4	2	2	5	6	5	3	4	1	178
5	(Italy) Samuele Bernardini	Honda	4	5	7	7	9	11	6	4	6	4	3	6	3	4	153
6	(Australia) Daniel Milner	TM	5	6	5	6	12	5	7	7	Ret	DNS	6	5	6	7	115
7	(Czech Republic) Kryštof Kouble	Husqvarna	7	11	8	10	7	8	8	10	8	Ret	7	7	7	8	102
8	(Australia) Wil Ruprecht	Sherco	9	9	6	4	4	6	9	11	3	5					98
9	(Spain) Marc Sans	Yamaha	13	10	10	9	11	12	Ret	DNS	7	7	8	9	8	6	82
10	(Argentina) Nicolas Kutulas	KTM	11	Ret	11	11	13	13	14	15	Ret	DNS	9	8	9	Ret	46
11	(Sweden) Albin Elowson	Husqvarna					5	9	5	6							39
12	(France) Hugo Blanjoue	KTM	10	Ret	9	8	10	10	Ret	DNS							33
13	(United Kingdom) Billy Bolt	Husqvarna	6	7													19
14	(Norway) Kevin Burud	KTM					15	14	15	14	Ret	Ret	10	Ret	10	Ret	18
15	(Finland) Eemil Pohjola	Honda					8	7									17
16	(Italy) Gianluca Martini	Gas Gas	8	8													16
17	(Sweden) Casper Lindholm	Husqvarna							12	8							12
18	(Sweden) Oskar Ljungström	Beta							11	9							12
19	(Sweden) Oliver Nelson	KTM							10	12							10
20	(Portugal) Renato Silva	Beta	12	12													8
21	(Sweden) Franz Löfquist	Yamaha							13	13							6
22	(Italy) Alessio Bigiarini	Husqvarna	14	13													5
23	(Finland) Ville Meisola	Kawasaki					14	Ret									2
	(Sweden) Lukas Printz	Gas Gas							16	17							0
	(Norway) Marcus Christensen	Husqvarna							18	16							0
	(Sweden) Emil Löfquist	Yamaha							17	18							0
Pos	Rider	Bike	ITA (Italy)		ESP (Spain)		FIN (Finland)		SWE (Sweden)		SVK (Slovakia)		POR (Portugal)		POR (Portugal)		Points

=== Enduro 3 ===
Enduro 3 is for 2-stroke motorcycles over 255cc and 4-stroke motorcycles over 455cc.

Team	Constructor	No	Rider	Rounds
JET Zanardo Racing Team	Husqvarna	3	(France) Christophe Charlier	1–2, 6–7
Rieju Factory Team	Rieju	8	(France) Léo Le Quéré	1–5
Beta Factory Enduro Team	Beta	12	(United Kingdom) Brad Freeman	All
TM Boano Factory Team	TM	25	(Italy) Matteo Cavallo	1–6
Sherco Factory Racing	Sherco	41	(Italy) Morgan Lesiardo	All
Sherco Factory Racing	Sherco	51	(France) Julien Roussaly	3–6
Sherco Factory Racing	Sherco	71	(Belgium) Antoine Magain	1–5, 7
Team Beta Oxmoto	Beta	49	(France) Luc Fargier	All
Electraction TM UK	TM	55	(United Kingdom) Jordan Scott	7
Adielsson Racing	Beta	57	(Sweden) Marcus Adielsson	1, 4
MGR Racing Team	Sherco	61	(New Zealand) Tom Buxton	1–5
Sherco Deutschland	Sherco	62	(Germany) Luca Fischeder	1–5
Team Pro Racing Sport	Husqvarna	69	(Sweden) Mikael Persson	All
WP Eric Augé KTM	KTM	94	(Spain) Jaume Betriu	All
Fantic Racing Enduro Team	Fantic	95	(Italy) Lorenzo Macoritto	All
GTG Motogamma Lunigiana Team	Gas Gas	178	(Chile) Benjamín Herrera	All
	Beta	201	(Italy) Walter Ludi	1
	Beta	224	(Italy) Mirko Ciani	1
	Sherco	242	(Italy) Andrea Martini	1

=== Riders Championship ===
Pos	Rider	Bike	ITA (Italy)		ESP (Spain)		FIN (Finland)		SWE (Sweden)		SVK (Slovakia)		POR (Portugal)		POR (Portugal)		Points
1	(United Kingdom) Brad Freeman	Beta	1	1	1	1	1	1	1	1	Ret	DNS	2	1	1	6	227
2	(Sweden) Mikael Persson	Husqvarna	2	2	2	5	3	2	5	5	1	1	3	2	2	1	225
3	(Belgium) Antoine Magain	Sherco	5	3	6	2	4	3	4	6	3	2			7	3	160
4	(Italy) Morgan Lesiardo	Sherco	6	7	9	8	8	6	2	3	9	5	7	4	8	9	139
5	(Italy) Matteo Cavallo	TM	3	4	3	3	2	5	3	2	4	Ret	Ret	DNS			131
6	(Chile) Benjamín Herrera	Gas Gas	7	5	Ret	11	9	10	7	8	5	4	8	8	6	7	114
7	(France) Luc Fargier	Beta	12	10	5	6	7	7	12	11	10	3	Ret	6	5	8	108
8	(Spain) Jaume Betriu	KTM	8	9	8	9	Ret	DNS	11	Ret	8	7	1	5	4	5	107
9	(Germany) Luca Fischeder	Sherco	9	Ret	4	4	5	4	8	4	2	Ret					95
10	(Italy) Lorenzo Macoritto	Fantic	11	8	7	10	12	11	9	10	Ret	Ret	6	7	Ret	4	82
11	(France) Christophe Charlier	Husqvarna	4	6	Ret	DNS							5	3	3	2	81
12	(France) Léo Le Quéré	Rieju	10	11	11	7	10	9	10	9	6	6					71
13	(France) Julien Roussaly	Sherco					6	8	6	7	7	Ret	4	DNS			59
14	(New Zealand) Tom Buxton	Sherco	13	13	10	12	11	12	13	13	11	8					44
15	(United Kingdom) Jordan Scott	TM													9	10	13
16	(Sweden) Marcus Adielsson	Beta	14	12					14	12							12
17	(Italy) Mirko Ciani	Beta	15	14													3
18	(Italy) Andrea Martini	Sherco	16	15													1
	(Italy) Walter Ludi	Beta	17	16													0
Pos	Rider	Bike	ITA (Italy)		ESP (Spain)		FIN (Finland)		SWE (Sweden)		SVK (Slovakia)		POR (Portugal)		POR (Portugal)		Points

== Junior ==
All riders competing in the Junior world championships must be younger than 23 years of age on 1 January of the year of the championship.

=== Riders Championship ===
Pos	Rider	Bike	Class	ITA (Italy)		ESP (Spain)		FIN (Finland)		SWE (Sweden)		SVK (Slovakia)		POR (Portugal)		POR (Portugal)		Points
1	(United Kingdom) Jed Etchells	Fantic	Junior 1	1	2	1	2	1	2	3	4	2	2	1	2	2	3	242
2	(Sweden) Albin Norrbin	Fantic	Junior 2	7	8	2	3	2	1	2	1	1	1	2	1	1	1	240
3	(Germany) Jeremy Sydow	Sherco	Junior 1	3	1	3	1	4	4	4	6	3	5	4	5	4	6	192
4	(Sweden) Max Ahlin	KTM	Junior 2	2	3	5	6	3	3	1	3	5	3	6	6	3	4	192
5	(Spain) Sergio Navarro	Husqvarna	Junior 1	4	4	4	4	8	5	6	5	4	4	3	4	5	5	168
6	(Sweden) Axel Semb	Husqvarna	Junior 2	5	5	10	5	12	6	5	2	24	Ret	9	7	11	12	106
7	(Spain) Alejandro Navarro	Beta	Junior 2	10	6	8	8	14	8	7	Ret	6	10	8	Ret	10	7	90
8	(Italy) Enrico Rinaldi	Gas Gas	Junior 2	8	7	6	12	5	12	20	15	7	6	13	15	14	10	78
9	(Finland) Samuli Puhakainen	Beta	Junior 1	11	10	7	9	7	10	12	9	11	7	10	12	16	20	77
10	(France) Antoine Alix	Beta	Junior 1	13	21	9	7	11	Ret	10	7	9	Ret	7	9	7	11	76
11	(Italy) Manolo Morettini	Honda	Junior 1	6	9	12	10	15	13	Ret	Ret	10	9	12	8	6	8	74
12	(United Kingdom) Harry Edmondson	Fantic	Junior 1	14	15	11	11	6	9	11	14	8	8	15	10	24	Ret	60
13	(Australia) Kyron Bacon	Yamaha	Junior 1											5	3	8	2	51
14	(Sweden) Max Erlandsson	Honda	Junior 2	12	12	22	18	13	7	8	8	13	12	18	19	13	13	49
15	(Finland) Peetu Juupaluoma	Husqvarna	Junior 1	9	14	15	14	9	11	9	11	21	Ret	17	16	9	17	43
16	(Spain) Albert Fontova	Gas Gas	Junior 2	16	11	21	15	16	15	14	10	Ret	DNS	11	11	12	9	36
17	(Czech Republic) Matěj Škuta	Beta	Junior 2	17	17	14	13	10	14	17	17	12	11	20	18	15	16	23
18	(Spain) Julio Pando	Beta	Junior 2	26	22	Ret	20	23	18	21	16	14	16	14	13	20	19	7
19	(Czech Republic) Matyas Chlum	Sherco	Junior 2	21	13	18	16					16	13					6
20	(Sweden) Nisse Bengtsson	Sherco	Junior 2							13	13							6
21	(Sweden) Lucas Bergström	Husqvarna	Junior 2							15	12							5
22	(Italy) Lorenzo Bernini	Gas Gas	Junior 1	19	16	13	Ret	18	16	16	20	15	15	23	Ret	17	18	5
23	(United Kingdom) Max Ingham	Yamaha	Junior 1	20	30	19	21							22	14	21	15	3
24	(South Africa) Davin Cocker	Husqvarna	Junior 2											19	17	18	14	2
25	(Czech Republic) Jaroslav Kalný	Sherco	Junior 2	27	25	23	19					17	14					2
26	(France) Killian Lunier	Husqvarna	Junior 2	15	18	Ret	DNS					19	Ret					1
Pos	Rider	Bike	Class	ITA (Italy)		ESP (Spain)		FIN (Finland)		SWE (Sweden)		SVK (Slovakia)		POR (Portugal)		POR (Portugal)		Points

=== Junior 1 ===
Junior 1 is for motorcycles up to and including 250cc, both 2-stroke and 4-stroke.

Team	Constructor	No	Rider	Rounds
Sherco Factory Racing	Sherco	6	(Germany) Jeremy Sydow	All
JET Fantic Racing Team	Fantic	16	(United Kingdom) Harry Edmondson	All
JET Fantic Racing Team	Fantic	47	(United Kingdom) Jed Etchells	All
JET Fantic Racing Team	Fantic	87	(Norway) Herman Ask	All
Team Beta Oxmoto	Beta	18	(France) Antoine Alix	All
Husqvarna Motorcycles Spain	Husqvarna	27	(Spain) Sergio Navarro	All
	Yamaha	30	(United Kingdom) Max Ingham	1–2, 6–7
Honda RedMoto World Enduro Team	Honda	38	(Italy) Manolo Morettini	All
Fantic Racing Enduro Team	Fantic	50	(Italy) Gianluca Facchetti	2, 6
Kytönen Motorsport	Husqvarna	52	(Finland) Peetu Juupaluoma	All
Beta Entrophy Team	Beta	53	(Finland) Samuli Puhakainen	1–6
Aspar Team	KTM	67	(Spain) Marti Escofet	2–4, 6
CEC Racing	Gas Gas	82	(Sweden) Arvid Karlsson	4
Rieju Factory Team	Rieju	92	(Spain) Adrià Sánchez	1–2, 6–7
Beta Trueba	Beta	111	(Spain) Alejandro Navarro	7
Team Gas Gas GTG Motogamma	Gas Gas	119	(Italy) Lorenzo Bernini	All
Team Triple One	KTM	146	(Sweden) Kalle Ahlin	4
Yamaha Johansson MPE	Yamaha	175	(Chile) Lucas Valdebenito	1–5
Yamaha Johansson MPE	Yamaha	228	(Australia) Kyron Bacon	6–7
Team Osellini Moto	Husqvarna	194	(Italy) Riccardo Fabris	1, 7
	Sherco	210	(Netherlands) Max Schwarte	4
Team Bloms MX Racing	Husqvarna	213	(Sweden) Robert Blom	4
Team A-Moto	KTM	219	(Sweden) Alfred Sundgren	4
Brouwer Motors KTM	KTM	226	(Netherlands) Mike Bokslag	4
Team Sherco Sweden	Sherco	232	(Sweden) Isac Friman	4
	Honda	247	(Italy) Alessandro Guerra	1, 3–4

=== Riders Championship ===
Pos	Rider	Bike	ITA (Italy)		ESP (Spain)		FIN (Finland)		SWE (Sweden)		SVK (Slovakia)		POR (Portugal)		POR (Portugal)		Points
1	(United Kingdom) Jed Etchells	Fantic	1	2	1	2	1	1	1	1	1	1	1	1	1	2	271
2	(Germany) Jeremy Sydow	Sherco	2	1	2	1	2	2	2	3	2	3	3	4	2	4	230
3	(Spain) Sergio Navarro	Husqvarna	3	3	3	3	5	3	3	2	3	2	2	3	3	3	212
4	(United Kingdom) Harry Edmondson	Fantic	8	7	6	7	3	4	6	7	4	5	8	7	11	Ret	129
5	(Finland) Samuli Puhakainen	Beta	6	5	4	5	4	5	7	5	7	4	6	8			129
6	(Italy) Manolo Morettini	Honda	4	4	7	6	8	7	Ret	Ret	6	6	7	5	4	5	126
7	(France) Antoine Alix	Beta	7	10	5	4	7	Ret	5	4	5	Ret	5	6	5	6	125
8	(Finland) Peetu Juupaluoma	Husqvarna	5	6	9	8	6	6	4	6	10	Ret	10	10	7	8	114
9	(Italy) Lorenzo Bernini	Gas Gas	10	8	8	Ret	9	8	8	10	8	7	13	Ret	8	9	86
10	(Australia) Kyron Bacon	Yamaha											4	2	6	1	60
11	(Chile) Lucas Valdebenito	Yamaha	13	12	12	12	10	9	9	9	9	9					56
12	(Norway) Herman Ask	Fantic	14	13	13	11	11	10	12	13	11	8	14	Ret	12	11	55
13	(Spain) Adrià Sánchez	Rieju	12	11	10	9							9	11	9	10	47
14	(United Kingdom) Max Ingham	Yamaha	11	15	11	10							12	9	10	7	43
15	(Sweden) Kalle Ahlin	KTM							10	8							14
16	(Italy) Riccardo Fabris	Husqvarna	9	9											Ret	Ret	14
17	(Netherlands) Max Schwarte	Sherco							11	11							10
18	(Italy) Alessandro Guerra	Honda	15	14			12	Ret	14	16							9
19	(Italy) Gianluca Facchetti	Fantic			14	Ret							11	Ret			7
20	(Sweden) Robert Blom	Husqvarna							15	12							5
21	(Spain) Marti Escofet	KTM			15	13	Ret	DNS	18	17			Ret	DNS			4
22	(Sweden) Isac Friman	Sherco							13	Ret							3
23	(Netherlands) Mike Bokslag	KTM							16	14							2
24	(Sweden) Arvid Karlsson	Gas Gas							17	15							1
	(Sweden) Alfred Sundgren	KTM							19	18							0
Pos	Rider	Bike	ITA (Italy)		ESP (Spain)		FIN (Finland)		SWE (Sweden)		SVK (Slovakia)		POR (Portugal)		POR (Portugal)		Points

=== Junior 2 ===
Junior 2 is for motorcycles over 255cc, both 2-stroke and 4-stroke.

Team	Constructor	No	Rider	Rounds
RFME Enduro Team	Beta	24	(Spain) Julio Pando	All
RFME Enduro Team	Gas Gas	28	(Spain) Albert Fontova	All
	Sherco	43	(Czech Republic) Matyas Chlum	1–2, 5
Beta Entrophy Team	Beta	53	(Finland) Samuli Puhakainen	7
Team Osellini Moto	Husqvarna	54	(Sweden) Axel Semb	All
Fantic Racing Enduro Team	Fantic	97	(Sweden) Albin Norrbin	All
Czech Enduro Team	Sherco	100	(Czech Republic) Jaroslav Kalný	1–2, 5
Czech Enduro Team	Husqvarna	169	(Czech Republic) Zdeněk Pitel	1
Beta Trueba	Beta	111	(Spain) Alejandro Navarro	1–6
JWR Honda Racing	Honda	114	(Sweden) Max Erlandsson	All
LM Racing	Husqvarna	120	(France) Killian Lunier	1–2, 5
GTG Motogamma Lunigiana Team	Gas Gas	144	(Italy) Enrico Rinaldi	All
KBS UAMK Team	Beta	152	(Czech Republic) Matěj Škuta	All
Team Gas Gas GTG Motogamma	Gas Gas	153	(Italy) Simone Cristini	All
Moto Maiche Rieju	Rieju	154	(France) Mathis Juillard	3–5
WP Eric Augé KTM	KTM	166	(Argentina) Cristobal Sola	1–2, 5
WP Eric Augé KTM	KTM	197	(Argentina) Lucas Godoy	1–4
KTM Team Pro Racing Sport	KTM	177	(Sweden) Max Ahlin	All
KTM Team Pro Racing Sport	KTM	181	(Brazil) Renato Paz	6
JET Zanardo/Husqvarna South Africa	Husqvarna	187	(South Africa) Davin Cocker	6–7
Team Eks El & Motor	Beta	209	(Sweden) Ludvig Nykvist	4
Team Sherco Sweden	Sherco	216	(Sweden) Nisse Bengtsson	4
Team Speedstore	Husqvarna	217	(Sweden) Alfons Andersson	4
Motostar Racing	Husqvarna	221	(Sweden) Lukas Largén	4
	Husqvarna	228	(Sweden) Kalle Hindström	4
Husqvarna Scandinavia	Husqvarna	231	(Sweden) Lucas Bergström	4
Team Bloms MX Racing	Husqvarna	234	(Sweden) William Berg	4
Sherco Academy France	Sherco	299	(France) David Guillemot	7

=== Riders Championship ===
Pos	Rider	Bike	ITA (Italy)		ESP (Spain)		FIN (Finland)		SWE (Sweden)		SVK (Slovakia)		POR (Portugal)		POR (Portugal)		Points
1	(Sweden) Albin Norrbin	Fantic	3	5	1	1	1	1	2	1	1	1	1	1	1	1	263
2	(Sweden) Max Ahlin	KTM	1	1	2	3	2	2	1	3	2	2	2	2	2	2	243
3	(Sweden) Axel Semb	Husqvarna	2	2	5	2	5	3	3	2	13	Ret	4	3	3	5	177
4	(Italy) Enrico Rinaldi	Gas Gas	4	4	3	5	3	6	10	8	4	3	6	6	6	4	162
5	(Sweden) Max Erlandsson	Honda	6	7	11	9	6	4	5	4	6	6	8	9	5	6	134
6	(Spain) Alejandro Navarro	Beta	5	3	4	4	7	5	4	Ret	3	4	3	Ret			128
7	(Czech Republic) Matěj Škuta	Beta	9	9	6	6	4	7	9	10	5	5	10	8	7	8	122
8	(Spain) Albert Fontova	Gas Gas	8	6	10	7	8	8	7	5	Ret	DNS	5	4	4	3	121
9	(Spain) Julio Pando	Beta	13	12	Ret	11	12	9	11	9	7	9	7	5	9	9	85
10	(Italy) Simone Cristini	Gas Gas	12	14	9	12	9	10	15	16	12	10	11	10	10	10	64
11	(Czech Republic) Matyas Chlum	Sherco	10	8	8	8					8	7					47
12	(South Africa) Davin Cocker	Husqvarna											9	7	8	7	33
13	(Czech Republic) Jaroslav Kalný	Sherco	14	13	12	10					9	8					30
14	(France) Mathis Juillard	Rieju					10	11	13	11	10	11					30
15	(Argentina) Cristobal Sola	KTM	11	11	7	14					Ret	DNS					21
16	(France) Killian Lunier	Husqvarna	7	10	Ret	DNS					11	Ret					20
17	(Argentina) Lucas Godoy	KTM	16	15	13	13	11	12	14	14							20
18	(Sweden) Nisse Bengtsson	Sherco							6	7							19
19	(Sweden) Lucas Bergström	Husqvarna							8	6							18
20	(France) David Guillemot	Sherco													11	11	10
21	(Sweden) William Berg	Husqvarna							12	12							8
22	(Sweden) Lukas Largén	Husqvarna							18	13							3
23	(Sweden) Kalle Hindström	Husqvarna							17	15							1
24	(Czech Republic) Zdeněk Pitel	Husqvarna	15	Ret													1
	(Sweden) Alfons Andersson	Husqvarna							16	17							0
	(Sweden) Ludvig Nykvist	Beta							19	Ret							0
	(Brazil) Renato Paz	KTM											Ret	DNS			0
Pos	Rider	Bike	ITA (Italy)		ESP (Spain)		FIN (Finland)		SWE (Sweden)		SVK (Slovakia)		POR (Portugal)		POR (Portugal)		Points

== Youth ==
All riders competing in the Youth world championship must be younger than 21 years of age on 1 January of the year of the championship.

Only 2-stroke motorcycles between 100cc-125cc can be used.

Team	Constructor	No	Rider	Rounds
WP Eric Augé KTM	KTM	4	(United Kingdom) Samuel Davies	1–4
WP Eric Augé KTM	KTM	132	(Venezuela) Manuel Fumero	1–2, 4–5
WP Eric Augé KTM	KTM	193	(Israel) Inbar Selinger	1–5, 7
RFME Enduro Team	KTM	9	(Spain) Lluis Gonfaus	1–4
RFME Enduro Team	KTM	104	(Spain) Alex Puey	All
FR Motosport	Beta	32	(Italy) Alberto Elgari	1
GTG Motogamma Lunigiana Team	Gas Gas	33	(Italy) Daniele Delbono	1–5
GTG Motogamma Lunigiana Team	Gas Gas	73	(Portugal) Frederico Rocha	All
Fantic Racing Enduro Team	Fantic	34	(Italy) Kevin Cristino	All
Fantic Racing Enduro Team	Fantic	37	(Italy) Valentino Corsi	All
Costa Ligure TM Youth Team	TM	44	(Chile) Camilo Herrera	6–7
Costa Ligure TM Youth Team	TM	155	(Italy) Gabriele Doglio	1
Costa Ligure TM Youth Team	TM	164	(Spain) Oriol Roca	2–7
Costa Ligure TM Youth Team	TM	185	(Italy) Samuli Boano	1
JET Fantic Racing Team	Fantic	45	(Argentina) Adolfo Scaglioni	1–4
Yamaha Johansson MPE	Yamaha	65	(Sweden) Arvid Modin	All
Yamaha Johansson MPE	Yamaha	296	(New Zealand) William Yeoman	3–4
Seisettecinque Racing	Sherco	75	(Italy) Bernardo Ruggeri	1
	KTM	77	(Spain) Aleix Saumell	1, 6
Beta Entrophy Junior Team	Beta	80	(Italy) Davide Mei	1–2, 4–7
Beta Entrophy Junior Team	Beta	121	(Italy) Luca Piersigilli	All
Team Osellini Moto	Husqvarna	83	(Sweden) Sebastian Olsen	All
Team Osellini Moto	Husqvarna	202	(Italy) Luca Colorio	1
West Racing Team	Beta	84	(Finland) Juho Ahokas	1
KTM Team Pro Racing Sport	KTM	90	(Italy) Manuel Verzeroli	All
Team Beta Oxmoto	Beta	96	(France) Leo Joyon	All
Sherco Academy France	Sherco	105	(France) Thibault Giraudon	All
Sherco Academy France	Sherco	264	(France) Diego Haution	7
Bonneton 2 Roues	Fantic	106	(France) Maxime Clauzier	1–5, 7
Bonneton 2 Roues	Fantic	108	(France) Clement Clauzier	All
Bonneton 2 Roues	Fantic	203	(France) Matteo Arrieta	2
Fantic Enduro Academy	Fantic	110	(Spain) Alfredo Pellicer	2
Kytönen Motorsport	Husqvarna	125	(Finland) Niko Puotsaari	All
Hot1 Racing	Yamaha	128	(Finland) Tiitus Enjala	6–7
Outsiders	Fantic	129	(France) Jules Rey	1–2
Sherco Portugal	Sherco	145	(Portugal) Francisco Leite	1–2, 6–7
Team KBS Sherco	Sherco	163	(United Kingdom) Douglas Lote	1, 3–4, 7
Atomic Moto	Beta	183	(Chile) Agustín Cortez	1–5
Atomic Moto	Husqvarna	232	(France) Valentin Mersin	7
	Yamaha	205	(Sweden) Petter Johnsson	4
CEC Racing	Husqvarna	206	(Sweden) Carl Olsson	4
CEC Racing	Yamaha	273	(Sweden) Linus Lamberg	4
Team Bloms MX Racing	KTM	207	(Sweden) Hugo Svensson	4
EW Racing	Beta	211	(Sweden) Edvin Wiberg	4
	Sherco	214	(Netherlands) Ties Bennink	4
Ljunggrens Motor	KTM	218	(Sweden) Alfons Lindström	4
	Beta	223	(Sweden) Oliver Önnefors	4
Fantic Motor Suomi	Fantic	226	(Finland) Roni Heikkala	3
	KTM	227	(Finland) Ukko Laaksonen	3
Team Motopalvelu	KTM	228	(Finland) Albert Juhola	3
Elite Moto 15 Enduro Team	KTM	234	(France) Gabin Allemand	7
ODY Racing	Beta	240	(Slovakia) Tomáš Merašický	5
ODY Racing	Beta	241	(Slovakia) Matúš Merašický	5
	Beta	251	(Sweden) Karl Lennartsson	4
Sherco Spain	Sherco	252	(Spain) Raúl Sánchez	2
Sherco Spain	Sherco	282	(Spain) Yago Domínguez	1–2, 6
Fantic Racing Junior Team	Fantic	292	(Italy) Pietro Scardina	6–7

=== Riders Championship ===
Pos	Rider	Bike	ITA (Italy)		ESP (Spain)		FIN (Finland)		SWE (Sweden)		SVK (Slovakia)		POR (Portugal)		POR (Portugal)		Points
1	(Italy) Kevin Cristino	Fantic	1	1	1	1	1	1	1	1	5	5	1	1	2	1	259
2	(France) Leo Joyon	Beta	3	3	3	3	2	3	3	2	2	1	2	2	1	2	232
3	(France) Thibault Giraudon	Sherco	2	2	2	2	3	2	2	3	1	2	3	7	3	9	215
4	(France) Clement Clauzier	Fantic	7	7	8	6	7	8	5	6	7	3	6	5	4	5	143
5	(France) Maxime Clauzier	Fantic	10	8	4	5	4	Ret	6	4	3	4			10	Ret	108
6	(Italy) Valentino Corsi	Fantic	4	4	10	7	Ret	DNS	23	7	4	6	5	4	5	Ret	108
7	(Italy) Manuel Verzeroli	KTM	9	6	7	4	19	13	4	11	12	7	7	14	9	4	104
8	(Italy) Davide Mei	Beta	11	11	5	8			7	5	6	8	12	Ret	15	13	75
9	(Spain) Alex Puey	KTM	13	23	6	9	5	Ret	12	17	10	Ret	10	8	6	6	75
10	(Sweden) Arvid Modin	Yamaha	16	12	12	12	10	7	10	8	11	10	11	9	Ret	7	73
11	(Italy) Daniele Delbono	Gas Gas	8	5	9	11	6	4	9	15	8	Ret					70
12	(Chile) Agustín Cortez	Beta	12	10	21	10	8	6	8	9	Ret	12					53
13	(Finland) Niko Puotsaari	Husqvarna	15	18	11	15	9	9	Ret	Ret	9	9	13	15	8	10	53
14	(Italy) Pietro Scardina	Fantic											4	3	7	3	52
15	(Sweden) Sebastian Olsen	Husqvarna	22	17	14	14	11	12	11	10	Ret	DNS	19	17	12	14	30
16	(Chile) Camilo Herrera	TM											8	6	Ret	8	26
17	(Spain) Yago Domínguez	Sherco	14	13	13	17							9	10			21
18	(Italy) Luca Piersigilli	Beta	19	19	19	18	13	15	16	16	13	11	18	12	13	15	20
19	(Italy) Alberto Elgari	Beta	5	9													18
20	(Italy) Luca Colorio	Husqvarna	6	14													12
21	(Finland) Tiitus Enjala	Yamaha											14	11	16	11	12
22	(New Zealand) William Yeoman	Yamaha					20	5	Ret	18							11
23	(United Kingdom) Samuel Davies	KTM	18	15	15	21	14	11	Ret	DNS							9
24	(Portugal) Frederico Rocha	Gas Gas	24	21	23	22	12	19	Ret	DNS	Ret	13	16	19	22	19	7
25	(Sweden) Alfons Lindström	KTM							13	12							6
26	(Finland) Albert Juhola	KTM					Ret	10									6
27	(Venezuela) Manuel Fumero	KTM	21	20	18	13			19	13	Ret	Ret					6
28	(Spain) Lluis Gonfaus	KTM	23	22	17	19	21	14	14	14							6
29	(France) Valentin Mersin	Husqvarna													11	17	5
30	(France) Diego Haution	Sherco													19	12	4
31	(Spain) Aleix Saumell	KTM	20	Ret									15	13			4
32	(France) Gabin Allemand	KTM													14	16	2
33	(Spain) Oriol Roca	TM			Ret	25	Ret	17	21	19	14	Ret	17	16	17	20	2
34	(Israel) Inbar Selinger	KTM	31	29	20	23	22	22	22	30	15	DSQ			21	21	1
35	(Netherlands) Ties Bennink	Sherco							15	23							1
36	(United Kingdom) Douglas Lote	Sherco	28	25			15	20	20	25					18	18	1
	(Spain) Alfredo Pellicer	Fantic			16	16											0
	(Italy) Gabriele Doglio	TM	17	16													0
	(Finland) Ukko Laaksonen	KTM					17	16									0
	(Finland) Roni Heikkala	Fantic					16	21									0
	(Sweden) Petter Johnsson	Yamaha							17	20							0
	(Argentina) Adolfo Scaglioni	Fantic	26	26	24	24	18	18	25	21							0
	(Portugal) Francisco Leite	Sherco	30	28	25	26							20	18	20	Ret	0
	(Sweden) Hugo Svensson	KTM							18	24							0
	(France) Matteo Arrieta	Fantic			26	20											0
	(France) Jules Rey	Fantic	25	24	22	27											0
	(Sweden) Edvin Wiberg	Beta							24	22							0
	(Sweden) Oliver Önnefors	Beta							28	26							0
	(Sweden) Linus Lamberg	Yamaha							26	29							0
	(Sweden) Karl Lennartsson	Beta							27	28							0
	(Italy) Bernardo Ruggeri	Sherco	29	27													0
	(Italy) Samuli Boano	TM	27	Ret													0
	(Sweden) Carl Olsson	Husqvarna							Ret	27							0
	(Slovakia) Tomáš Merašický	Beta									Ret	Ret					0
	(Slovakia) Matúš Merašický	Beta									Ret	Ret					0
	(Finland) Juho Ahokas	Beta	Ret	DNS													0
	(Spain) Raúl Sánchez	Sherco			Ret	DNS											0
Pos	Rider	Bike	ITA (Italy)		ESP (Spain)		FIN (Finland)		SWE (Sweden)		SVK (Slovakia)		POR (Portugal)		POR (Portugal)		Points

== Women ==
Competitors in the Women's world championship can compete on any capacity of motorcycle of their choosing.

Team	Constructor	No	Rider	Rounds
Dr Shox/Off Road Try Out	Sherco	404	(United Kingdom) Nieve Holmes	All
Göta MS	Beta	405	(Sweden) Hanna Lagher	3
KTM Scandinavia	KTM	410	(Sweden) Hedvig Malm	All
Inmoto Beta Adriatic	Beta	412	(Slovenia) Tjaša Fifer	1, 3
Rieju Factory Team	Rieju	416	(United Kingdom) Rosie Rowett	All
Rieju Factory Team	Rieju	432	(Spain) Mireia Badia	1–2, 4
Sherco Academy France	Sherco	420	(France) Elodie Chaplot	All
WPM Motors	Gas Gas	422	(Norway) Vilde Holt	All
LM Racing	Husqvarna	424	(France) Marine Lemoine	1–3
Yamaha JGR Ballards Offroad	Yamaha	426	(Australia) Danielle McDonald	4
Kytönen Motorsport	Husqvarna	435	(Finland) Viivi-Maria Mäkinen	2–3
SE Team	Yamaha	439	(Finland) Janette Mielonen	1–3
RFME Enduro Team	Husqvarna	441	(Spain) Mireia Rabionet	1, 4
JET Zanardo	Husqvarna	442	(Argentina) Carla Scaglioni	3
Honda RedMoto World Enduro Team	Honda	443	(Italy) Francesca Nocera	All
Factory Image Racing	Beta	444	(United Kingdom) Elizabeth Tett	4
Bombe Racing Team	Beta	457	(Germany) Samantha Buhmann	All
Beta Entrophy Team	Beta	472	(Italy) Aurora Pittaluga	1
Jetmar Husqvarna	Husqvarna	474	(Portugal) Joana Gonçalves	1–3
Yamaha Johansson MPE	Yamaha	477	(Australia) Jessica Gardiner	All
	Beta	494	(Sweden) Linnéa Åkesson	2–3
Atomic Moto	Beta	495	(France) Justine Martel	1–3
JET Fantic Racing Team	Fantic	496	(United Kingdom) Jane Daniels	All
Husqvarna Scandinavia	Husqvarna	499	(Sweden) Hanna Berzelius	3

=== Riders Championship ===
Pos	Rider	Bike	ITA (Italy)		FIN (Finland)		SWE (Sweden)		POR (Portugal)		Points
1	(United Kingdom) Jane Daniels	Fantic	1	1	1	1	1	1	1	1	160
2	(Australia) Jessica Gardiner	Yamaha	2	3	3	4	3	3	4	5	114
3	(Italy) Francesca Nocera	Honda	3	4	6	2	13	2	2	2	109
4	(United Kingdom) Rosie Rowett	Rieju	5	5	2	5	2	4	5	6	101
5	(Sweden) Hedvig Malm	KTM	6	6	4	3	6	6	10	10	80
6	(United Kingdom) Nieve Holmes	Sherco	9	8	5	6	5	7	8	9	71
7	(Spain) Mireia Badia	Rieju	4	2	Ret	DNS			3	3	60
8	(France) Elodie Chaplot	Sherco	7	Ret	8	15	7	8	9	8	50
9	(France) Justine Martel	Beta	8	7	7	8	9	9			48
10	(Norway) Vilde Holt	Gas Gas	10	10	9	7	Ret	DNS	7	7	46
11	(Sweden) Linnéa Åkesson	Beta			12	9	4	5			35
12	(France) Marine Lemoine	Husqvarna	11	11	11	10	12	12			29
13	(Portugal) Joana Gonçalves	Husqvarna	13	13	10	12	11	10			27
14	(Australia) Danielle McDonald	Yamaha							6	4	23
15	(Slovenia) Tjaša Fifer	Beta	14	9			10	11			20
16	(Spain) Mireia Rabionet	KTM	12	12					11	11	18
17	(Finland) Janette Mielonen	Yamaha	15	14	14	11	14	DNS			12
18	(Germany) Samantha Buhmann	Beta	17	16	15	14	18	15	13	13	10
19	(Sweden) Hanna Berzelius	Husqvarna					8	Ret			8
20	(United Kingdom) Elizabeth Tett	Beta							12	12	8
21	(Finland) Viivi-Maria Mäkinen	Husqvarna			13	13	17	Ret			6
22	(Sweden) Hanna Lagher	Beta					15	13			4
23	(Argentina) Carla Scaglioni	Husqvarna					16	14			2
24	(Italy) Aurora Pittaluga	Beta	16	15							1
Pos	Rider	Bike	ITA (Italy)		FIN (Finland)		SWE (Sweden)		POR (Portugal)		Points

== Open World Cup ==
=== Open 2-Stroke ===
Open 2-Stroke is for 2-stroke motorcycles of any engine capacity.

Team	Constructor	No	Rider	Rounds
Rieju Factory Team	Rieju	416	(United Kingdom) Rosie Rowett	6
Claudio Moto	Sherco	501	(Italy) Riccardo Mazzulla	1
	Beta	502	(Italy) Tommaso Corte	1
Enduro Echt Gold Team Příchovice	Gas Gas	503	(Czech Republic) Robert Friedrich	1–2, 4–5
3G Factory Team	KTM	504	(Italy) Lorenzo Moretti	1
RX Moto Oy	Husqvarna	507	(Finland) Mika Lindfors	3
	TM	509	(Greece) Panagiotis Zafeiriou	5
E.T. James Enduro Team	Sherco	510	(United Kingdom) Jack Probert	6–7
	KTM	511	(Finland) Tomi Hartikainen	3
Jarsen Enduro Team	Sherco	512	(Czech Republic) Jiri Hadek	1–2, 4–7
Basolí Motos	KTM	514	(Spain) Esteve Serarols	1
Beta Oxmoto	Beta	515	(France) Cyril Raynaud	All
	Husqvarna	516	(Italy) Simone Martini	1
Stombergs Racing	Beta	517	(Sweden) Arvid Hellqvist	4
	Husqvarna	519	(Sweden) Vide Engström	4
	Beta	520	(Finland) Kimmo Tielinen	3
Univok KTM	KTM	537	(Czech Republic) Tomáš Koucký	5
Czech Enduro Team	Husqvarna	538	(Czech Republic) Radek Bezděk	1
KTM Switzerland	KTM	540	(Switzerland) Steve Erzer	1
Sherco Vukcevic Racing	Sherco	542	(Belgium) Tim Louis	1–2
Enduro Team Devils	Rieju	545	(Slovakia) Martin Hodas	5
	Beta	556	(Sweden) Giannis Nastasai	1
AMK Hamry	KTM	572	(Czech Republic) Oldřich Sedlák	1, 5
Team Gas Gas Sklep	Gas Gas	575	(Poland) Kacper Baklarz	5
Team A-Moto	KTM	577	(Sweden) Måns Dalén	4
	KTM	578	(Hungary) Roland Noel Liszka	5
	Beta	579	(Italy) Matteo Bresolin	1
	KTM	584	(Italy) Stefano Giacobini	1
	KTM	591	(Austria) Luca Seppele	2
	Beta	593	(Italy) Federico Oderda	1
	Sherco	599	(Hungary) Dániel Tádics	5

=== Riders Championship ===
Pos	Rider	Bike	ITA (Italy)		ESP (Spain)		FIN (Finland)		SWE (Sweden)		SVK (Slovakia)		POR (Portugal)		POR (Portugal)		Points
1	(Czech Republic) Jiri Hadek	Sherco	2	1	1	2			1	1	2	1	1	1	1	1	160
2	(France) Cyril Raynaud	Beta	4	4	3	4	1	1	3	3	7	7	2	2	2	2	138
3	(Czech Republic) Robert Friedrich	Gas Gas	3	3	2	1			2	2	3	3					131
4	(United Kingdom) Jack Probert	Sherco											3	3	3	3	60
5	(Belgium) Tim Louis	Sherco	5	2	4	3											56
6	(Hungary) Roland Noel Liszka	KTM									1	2					37
7	(Finland) Kimmo Tielinen	Beta					2	2									34
8	(Finland) Tomi Hartikainen	KTM					4	3									28
9	(Finland) Mika Lindfors	Husqvarna					3	4									28
10	(United Kingdom) Rosie Rowett	Rieju											4	4			26
11	(Sweden) Vide Engström	Husqvarna							4	4							26
12	(Czech Republic) Oldřich Sedlák	KTM	13	8							9	8					26
13	(Poland) Kacper Baklarz	Gas Gas									4	5					24
14	(Czech Republic) Tomáš Koucký	KTM									6	4					23
15	(Hungary) Dániel Tádics	Sherco									5	6					21
16	(Sweden) Måns Dalén	KTM							6	5							21
17	(Sweden) Arvid Hellqvist	Beta							5	6							21
18	(Switzerland) Steve Erzer	KTM	6	5													21
19	(Italy) Matteo Bresolin	Beta	1	Ret													20
20	(Italy) Simone Martini	Husqvarna	7	6													19
21	(Czech Republic) Radek Bezděk	Husqvarna	8	7													17
22	(Slovakia) Martin Hodas	Rieju									8	9					15
23	(Italy) Riccardo Mazzulla	Sherco	9	9													14
24	(Austria) Luca Seppele	KTM			Ret	5											11
25	(Italy) Federico Oderda	Beta	12	10													10
26	(Spain) Esteve Serarols	KTM	10	12													10
27	(Italy) Stefano Giacobini	KTM	11	11													10
28	(Italy) Tommaso Corte	Beta	14	13													5
29	(Italy) Lorenzo Moretti	KTM	15	14													3
	(Greece) Panagiotis Zafeiriou	TM									Ret	Ret					0
	(Sweden) Giannis Nastasai	Beta	Ret	DNS													0
Pos	Rider	Bike	ITA (Italy)		ESP (Spain)		FIN (Finland)		SWE (Sweden)		SVK (Slovakia)		POR (Portugal)		POR (Portugal)		Points

=== Open 4-Stroke ===
Open 4-Stroke is for 4-stroke motorcycles of any engine capacity.

Team	Constructor	No	Rider	Rounds
Honda RedMoto World Enduro Team	Honda	443	(Italy) Francesca Nocera	5
KBS UAMK Team	Husqvarna	601	(Czech Republic) Jakub Hroneš	1–3, 5–6
Bonneton 2 Roues	Fantic	602	(France) Enzo Marchal	All
GT2 Motorsport	Husqvarna	603	(Czech Republic) Tomas Vasek	5
Bodro Team	KTM	604	(Czech Republic) Marek Borák	5
Bodro Team	Husqvarna	626	(Czech Republic) Filip Klabačka	5
	Husqvarna	605	(Italy) Simone Mistretta	1
Igoa Moto	Husqvarna	606	(France) Franck Luberriaga	2
	KTM	609	(Switzerland) Kélien Michaud	1
Tristan Moto KTM Switzerland	KTM	610	(Switzerland) Alexandre Vaudan	1
	Gas Gas	612	(Finland) Mikko Leppänen	3
ODY Racing	KTM	614	(Slovakia) Tomáš Vanovčan	5
ODY Racing	Beta	693	(Slovakia) Jaroslav Dubóczi	5
	KTM	619	(Czech Republic) Filip Fiala	5
	Husqvarna	620	(Finland) Joose Kojo	3
Team KTM Walzer	KTM	623	(Austria) Marcel Schnölzer	4
	Husqvarna	625	(Czech Republic) Adam Gottvald	5
Team Honda Impala	Honda	627	(Spain) Alejandro Ceballos-Escalera	1–4, 7
Team Honda Impala	Honda	683	(Spain) Benet Gomez	1
	KTM	628	(Sweden) Markus Carlbom	4
Freetime Husqvarna Nordic	Husqvarna	631	(Estonia) Priit Biene	3
	KTM	635	(Finland) Atte Salo	3
	Yamaha	636	(Slovakia) Jaroslav Diro	5
	TM	639	(Germany) Max Schäfer	5
	KTM	640	(Italy) Riccardo Derocchi	1
Honda RedMoto	Honda	643	(Italy) Diego Lupatini	1
	Husqvarna	645	(Finland) Aleksi Alanne	3–4, 6–7
Pro Circuit Team Sweden	KTM	647	(Sweden) Ludvig Petterson	4
Pro Circuit Team Sweden	KTM	669	(Sweden) Carl Andersson	4
	Honda	649	(Austria) Dominic Spendl	1, 3–5
	Honda	650	(Austria) Thomas Boder	1, 3–5
JET Zanardo Racing Team	Husqvarna	651	(Sweden) Robin Wiss	1–4, 6–7
	Sherco	652	(Czech Republic) Daniel Polak	1, 5
	Beta	653	(Austria) Florian Salbrechter	1, 3–5
	Kawasaki	656	(Finland) Jani Salonen	3
	Husqvarna	660	(France) Luc Molin Pradel	1–2
	Sherco	663	(Sweden) Dennis Henberg	4
Kawasaki Suomi	Kawasaki	666	(Finland) Jussi Arvaja	3
Kawasaki Suomi	Kawasaki	690	(Finland) Aksu Keurulainen	3
	KTM	670	(Sweden) Emil Löf	4
Czech Enduro Team	KTM	682	(Czech Republic) Tomáš Holý	5
Team Osellini Moto	Husqvarna	686	(Italy) Mattia Traversi	1
	TM	690	(Italy) Matteo Sordo	1
Fratelli Porro Racing Team	TM	697	(Italy) Marco Vizio	1

=== Riders Championship ===
Pos	Rider	Bike	ITA (Italy)		ESP (Spain)		FIN (Finland)		SWE (Sweden)		SVK (Slovakia)		POR (Portugal)		POR (Portugal)		Points
1	(France) Enzo Marchal	Fantic	1	1	1	1	Ret	1	1	2	1	1	1	Ret	1	1	160
2	(Spain) Alejandro Ceballos-Escalera	Honda	2	2	2	2	1	2	2	1					2	2	142
3	(Sweden) Robin Wiss	Husqvarna	3	4	3	4	2	4	7	7			2	2	3	3	124
4	(Czech Republic) Jakub Hroneš	Husqvarna	6	7	4	3	4	6			2	2	3	1			120
5	(Finland) Aleksi Alanne	Husqvarna					10	13	13	13			4	3	4	4	69
6	(Austria) Dominic Spendl	Honda	10	8			Ret	8	8	6	5	5					62
7	(Austria) Florian Salbrechter	Beta	9	6			7	5	5	5	Ret	Ret					59
8	(Austria) Thomas Boder	Honda	13	12			11	Ret	11	11	10	8					36
9	(Austria) Marcel Schnölzer	KTM							3	3							30
10	(Czech Republic) Tomas Vasek	Husqvarna									4	3					28
11	(Italy) Simone Mistretta	Husqvarna	4	3													28
12	(Sweden) Carl Andersson	KTM							4	4							26
13	(Finland) Jussi Arvaja	Kawasaki					6	3									25
14	(Czech Republic) Marek Borák	KTM									6	4					23
15	(Finland) Jani Salonen	Kawasaki					3	9									22
16	(France) Franck Luberriaga	Husqvarna			5	5											22
17	(Switzerland) Alexandre Vaudan	KTM	5	5													22
18	(Estonia) Priit Biene	Husqvarna					5	7									20
19	(Czech Republic) Adam Gottvald	Husqvarna									7	6					19
20	(Sweden) Markus Carlbom	KTM							6	8							18
21	(Italy) Matteo Sordo	TM	7	9													16
22	(Slovakia) Tomáš Vanovčan	KTM									3	Ret					15
23	(Czech Republic) Filip Klabačka	Husqvarna									11	7					14
24	(Finland) Mikko Leppanen	Gas Gas					8	10									14
25	(Sweden) Dennis Henberg	Sherco							9	9							14
26	(Finland) Aksu Keurulainen	Kawasaki					9	11									12
27	(Sweden) Ludvig Petterson	KTM							10	10							12
28	(France) Luc Molin Pradel	Husqvarna	8	13	Ret	DNS											11
29	(Italy) Diego Lupatini	Honda	11	10													11
30	(Czech Republic) Tomáš Holý	KTM									13	9					10
31	(Italy) Marco Vizio	TM	12	11													9
32	(Czech Republic) Filip Fiala	KTM									8	Ret					8
33	(Sweden) Emil Löf	KTM							12	12							8
34	(Finland) Atte Salo	KTM					12	12									8
35	(Slovakia) Jaroslav Dubóczi	Beta									9	Ret					7
36	(Czech Republic) Daniel Polak	Sherco	14	14							15	DNS					5
37	(Germany) Max Schäfer	TM									12	Ret					4
38	(Italy) Francesca Nocera	Honda									14	Ret					2
39	(Italy) Riccardo Derocchi	KTM	15	15													2
	(Spain) Benet Gomez	Honda	Ret	Ret													0
	(Finland) Joose Kojo	Husqvarna					Ret	Ret									0
	(Switzerland) Kélien Michaud	KTM	Ret	DNS													0
	(Italy) Mattia Traversi	Husqvarna	Ret	DNS													0
	(Slovakia) Jaroslav Diro^{†}	Yamaha									Ret^{†}	DNS					0
Pos	Rider	Bike	ITA (Italy)		ESP (Spain)		FIN (Finland)		SWE (Sweden)		SVK (Slovakia)		POR (Portugal)		POR (Portugal)		Points
