= Santo André (Santiago do Cacém) =

- Civil parish
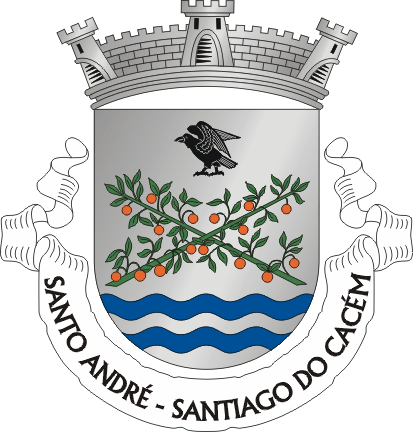
- Coat of arms

- Location in Portugal
- Coordinates: 38.05°N 8.75°W
- Country: Portugal
- Region: Alentejo
- Intermunic. comm.: Alentejo Litoral
- District: Setúbal
- Municipality: Santiago do Cacém

Area
  - Total: 75.11 km^{2} (29.00 sq mi)

Population (2011)
  - Total: 10,647
  - Density: 140/km^{2} (370/sq mi)
- Time zone: UTC+00:00 (WET)
  - Summer (DST): UTC+01:00 (WEST)

Vila Nova de Santo André (pronounced [ˈvilɐ ˈnɔvɐ ðɨ ˈsɐ̃t(u) ɐ̃ˈdɾɛ]), usually just called Santo André, is a city located near the Atlantic Ocean and belonging to the municipality of Santiago do Cacém, Alentejo Litoral, in Portugal. The population in 2011 was 10,647, in an area of 75.11 km^{2}.

It is a planned city built in the 1980s, to serve the region's oil industry. It is, from all of Santiago do Cacém's parishes, the one nearer to the sea and it is surrounded as follows: to the North, by Melides; to the West, by the Atlantic Ocean; to the East, by Santiago do Cacém and Santa Cruz; and to the South, by Sines. It is one of the youngest cities in the world with approximately two years as a city and 30 years since it was founded. It is mostly a residential suburb for the industrial city of Sines, from which is about 10 miles.

== Origin ==
The choice of Saint Andrew for patron of the Church that would give name to the present city (Cidade de Vila Nova de Santo André) and village (Aldeia de Santo André), simultaneously, is easily understood: Saint Andrew, brother of Saint Peter, was, like him, a fisherman, and the first of the two to meet and follow Christ. His life is intimately connected to the sea and fishing culture as so was that of the people who lived in Aldeia de Santo André. It was promoted to city (Cidade) in 2003

== History ==
Surrounding the first church of Santo André the first houses sprung, as is natural, and, as expected, it inhabitants were deeply connected to the religious cult. Some of them preserved the church (where an old cemetery use to lay), while others were related to the fishing activities in Santo André's lagoon and others, still, were economically linked to the region's annual fair (that still exists nowadays).

According to Father António Macedo e Silva, a precious source of information about the municipality of Santiago do Cacém, Santo André was created after other parishes in the municipality, either during the reign of D. João I (1385–1433) or during the reign of D. Duarte (1433–1438). All the rural parishes of this time, except for Santo André, already existed in the year of 1528. Either created in the 15th century or not, it is known for a fact that the parish already existed in the 16th century, with half a dozen houses that lived in the shadow of the Church who had given name to this place and whose population lived of the exploration of the lagoon, soil and fair commerce.

According to the obtained information there was, in the Church, a "very thick book and very old with a cover of sheep wool", that certainly must have contained records of baptisms, deaths and marriages, as well as other important documents referring to the life of the locals. It is known, however, that the Church was built in 1834.

Santo André, first a parish then a village, started to turn into a meeting point for people of the land and people of the sea.

The main income source was the rice culture. The rice cycle, that started in 1804, would only end in 1974, when the Gabinete da Área de Sines (an organism created on June 19, 1971, that created and managed the Santo André as an Urban Center up until the December 29, 1988, when it was extinct) started a new cycle that would come to be known as concrete cycle.

In the beginning of 1973, taking advantage of the oil exploration in that was taking place in Cabinda and providing huge amounts of oil, the Portuguese government decided to create and industrial complex destined to implant the petrochemical exploration in the country, and thus make a stand in the European context where industries of this type were already being developed and used to create wealth.

Thus, the Urban Center of Santo André was born, which would be raised to city on July 1, 2003.

Prior to this large expropriations took place, and an area (integrated between the municipality of Santiago and Sines) was delineated for the birth of Santo André. The industrial platform eventually grew and came to be known as Complexo Petroquímico de Sines (Sines' Petrochemical Complex), where the country's largest oil refinery, Petrogal (former Petrosul), as well as other important industries (among which a thermal electrical power station and the to-be-biggest port of Europe), still operates.

As there was a preoccupation with the environment as well as with the health of the industrial complex's workers, Santo André was kept at a minimum distance of 10 km and a pine forest that works as a protection from eventual catastrophe.

== Coat of arms ==
Coat of arms: Shield of silver with two green branches of orange tree, fruited in orange, crossed (St. Andrew's cross), with a black crow above and three blue and silver waves below. Three-towered mural crown in silver. White scroll with black lettering, in capitals, reading SANTO ANDRÉ - SANTIAGO DO CACÉM. Flag: blue, rope and tassels in silver and blue.

== Urban areas ==
Santo André is made up of seven urban areas/zones:

- Costa de Santo André(Coastal area)
- Brescos
- Deixa-o-Resto
- Azinhal
- Aldeia de Santo André (historical origin of the name)
- Giz
- Vila Nova de Santo André (main urban/itself)

== Geography ==
Santo André is located in the region of Alentejo, in Portugal, and belongs to the municipality of Santiago do Cacém, in the subregion of Alentejo Litoral.

It is very near the sea (2 km) and also near the Alentejo Southwest and Vicentyne Coast, a protected area. Its climate is temperate, with monthly means ranging from 8 to 16 °C in the winter and 18 to 28 °C in the summer. Absolute extremes are 0 °C in winter and 41 °C in summer. In terms of precipitation, the climate is somewhat dry, with annual mean of 570–620 mm falling mostly between November and April. Thin-sand soil can be found in some places and in the city there are a lot of pine trees.

There are some extensive sandy beaches within. The extensive forest that protects Santo André is a good example of possible respect between the protection of the environment and the industrial development.

== Economy ==
Santo André was built during the 1970s to answer the housing needs of the workers of the industrial complex of Sines. For the next two decades it attracted inhabitants from all over the country and especially people from Portugal's African ex-colonies. These people were mainly skilled technicians and people with an average education (9th–12th grade) or higher (university). This originated a very young population with a wealth considerably higher than the national average. Santo André's inhabitants enjoy a higher-than-average living quality, for which the beaches, as well as the proximity of the Natural Park of Southwest Alentejo and Costa Vicentina, help contribute. Sines, only a few minutes from Santo André, by car, is one of the most dynamic cities of the Alentejo, having kept all its historical charm. It still represents a main center for development in the province of Alentejo, especially since the University was built in Santo André.

Before Santo André was built the locals made their livings from fishing (in the sea and in the lagoon), agriculture (mainly rice) and fairs. Nowadays, industry is very important to the economy, giving work to thousands of the people of Santo André. Local commerce is also important, but on a smaller scale.

== Demographics ==
Santo André occupies an area of 74.32 km^{2} with a population of 10,751 (1991 census), most of whom are Roman Catholic.

In the beginning of 2005 it was considered to have about 14,000 inhabitants.

== Patrimony ==
=== Historical ===
- Igreja Paroquial de Santo André - 18th century

Built in Santo André, and rebuilt in 1815, Baroque style, it possesses a beautiful porch from the Manueline architecture of the 16th century, that had belonged to the initial church and under which people are nowadays baptized.

- Ermida de Nossa Senhora da Graça - 18th century

Also of Baroque style, this fountain was built in 1744, in a pleasant place outside Aldeia de Santo André. It owes its name to a previously existing fountain.

- Igreja de Santa Maria - 20th century

Built in Vila Nova de Santo André, this modern style church was inaugurated on December 8, 1993. On the inside, one can appreciate the Via Sacra, a creation of artist Graça Lagrifa. On the outside there is a tile panel, with an image of Mary, by Chloe Mac Millan.

=== Natural ===
Beaches

There are beaches of fine sand. The paths of the "Blue Coast" (as it is classified) seem to characterize the landscape of Alentejo. The first impression one has (when in Portugal) when talking about the Alentejo is the image of a burning plain (this is one of Portugal's hottest regions). However, there are dozens of kilometers of beach throughout the coast of Alentejo, ranging from Sado's southern margin (in Tróia) to the beginning of the Algarve. The giant extension of sand that connects Tróia to Sines, with over 60 km, has some of the best beaches in Portugal (better water quality, cleaner sand and water, as well as good surf spots, than most of the country). They include:

- "Costa" (Coast) beach - has watchers; good for surfing, windsurfing and fishing.
- "Areias Brancas" (White Sands) beach - ideal windsurf conditions.
- "Fonte do Cortiço" (Cork Fountain) beach - good windsurf conditions and considered one of this area's natural sanctuaries.
- "Monte Velho" (Old Mountain) beach - good windsurf conditions; classified by the Environment Ministry as a Golden Beach for presenting itself as one of the best-preserved beaches in the country; it is a part of the protected area of the Lagoons of Sancha and Santo André and contains several walking trails through its dunes, that lead to places of natural and ecological value.

Lagoons

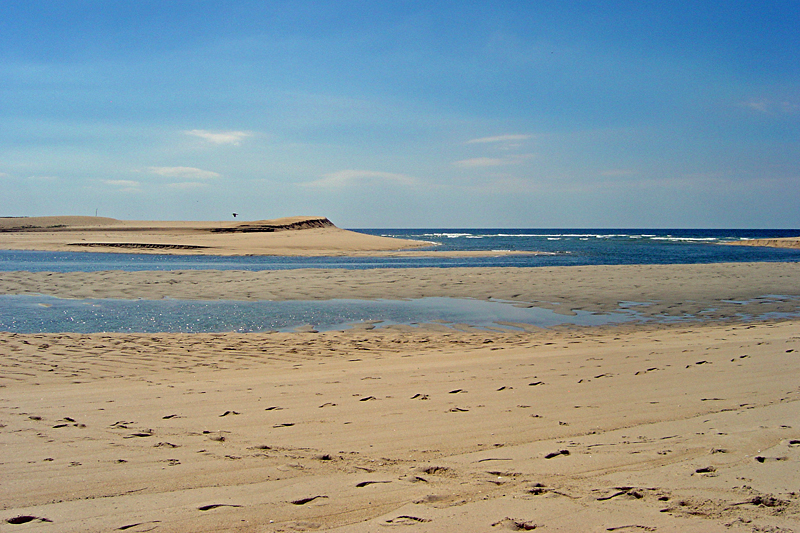
Santo André Lagoon, near the sea

Up to the 17th century, Santo André's Lagoon this lagoon was called Lagoa de Pêra (Pear Lagoon) and was always communicating with the sea Nowadays it is kept "closed" from contact with the sea most of the time, but sometimes (for health purposes) the water is "renewed". The lagoon and the beach are a perfect match when it comes to creating a splendid place on its calm waters, with the green from the wild pine trees and low flights of birds their combination makes for a heavenly place to rest, defining the most direct contact in nature-type holidays. It is considered a Wet Spot of International Importance, for there are some bird species that do their nests in its surrounding and for being the biggest lagoon system of all of Alentejo's Coast, offering a landscape of particular interest and great natural conditions, a fundamental aspect of attraction to becoming a great tourist center in a delicate and tranquil environment. Its connection to the sea is made once per year - by Man - in Spring, thus matching the reproduction periods of numerous marine species. The nature reserve of the Lagoons of Santo André and Sancha is one of the most emblematic places of Santo André, one where we can enjoy the variety of fauna and flora of this region, and which is chosen for the protection of a very rich diversity of aquatic birds: ducks, geese, cranes, grebes, curlews, gannets and coots, that used to be hunted every year. It is also the passing ground for many migratory birds. There are some otter shelters in the Lagoons.

== Amenities ==
Santo André also the following amenities:

- A pre-school
- Nuclisol Jean Piaget – the association for the Development of the Child, Integration and Solidarity.
- A health unit
- An extension of the Health Center of Santiago do Cacém
- A Permanent care center for the seaside Alentejo
- A medical center
- The Santa Maria's Social and Parish Center
- The sports and recreation center for the workers of Borealis
- A hunter Association of Santo André
- The Scout Group 851 of the Corpo Nacional de Escutas - Escutismo Católico Português
- A municipal Library (in construction)
- A cultural center
- A theatre group - O GATO, SA
- A University Campus
- A theatreteque and Youth Association for the friends of GATO (named "Ajagato")
- A quadriculture association
- An association for the educational and cultural development of the seaside Alentejo (named "ADECLA")
- A center for teaching arts (named "CAP Alda Guerreiro")
- Santiago do Cacém's center for educational resources
- A Municipal sports park
- A public garden (named "Parque Central")
- The nature reserve of the Lagoons of Santo André and Sancha
- The National Guard headquarters

== Schools ==
Santo André has three primary schools: EB2, EB3 and EB4 and one school with 5th to 6th grade (covering the last two basic education levels).

It also has a secondary school named Escola Secundária Padre António Macedo (ESPAM) which is an extended secondary school, with students from the 7th grade to the 12th grade.

Santo André, although small, contains a University Campus made up by Instituto Superior de Estudos Interculturais e Transdisciplinares, loosely translated as "Higher Education Institute for Intercultural and Transdisciplinary Studies" and has based its teaching policy in the region's characteristics: Sines' industries, the lacks of the Alentejo interior and its potential as a tourist region. To find a suitable example between the academic environment and Santo André's surroundings one needs only to go to the beach after school. This institute's activity was started in the year 2002. The following courses can be studied:

- Human Motricity
- Tourism and Hotel Management

The latter one is supported actively by a local Hotel, Vila Park, a project associated with the Piaget Institute. The Higher Education School of Health will be teaching health-related subjects in the future. The campus has labs, computer rooms and a library, as well as facilities for sports and services. Other facilities include: an amphitheatre, an auditorium, a fitness gym, a psycomotion therapy room and an exposition room.
