= 2025 FIM Enduro World Championship =

2025 world enduro championship season

The 2025 World Enduro Championship was the 36th season of the FIM World Enduro Championship. The season consisted of seven events.

Josep García went into the championship after winning both the EnduroGP and Enduro 1 classes in 2024. Andrea Verona was the reigning Enduro 2 champion, with Brad Freeman going into the season after taking the Enduro 3 title the previous season.

== Calendar ==
An eight-round calendar was announced in August 2024.

In March 2025, the round scheduled to take place in Romania was cancelled due to an outbreak of African swine fever virus in the vicinity of where the event was due to take place.

The round scheduled to take place in France was also cancelled after the season had started. This was later replaced by a second event in Portugal.

Round	Event	Location	Dates
1	Portugal	Fafe	4–6 April
2	Spain	Oliana	2–4 May
3	Sweden	Skövde	23–25 May
4	United Kingdom	Rhayader	1–3 August
5	Portugal	Vila de Rei	12–14 September
6	Italy	Darfo Boario Terme	26–28 September
7	Germany	Zschopau	17–19 October

== EnduroGP ==
=== Participants ===
Enduro 1 Riders
Team	Constructor	No	Rider	Rounds
Red Bull KTM Factory Racing	KTM	1	(Spain) Josep García	All
Sherco Factory Team	Sherco	6	(Germany) Jeremy Sydow	1, 4–7
MGR Kawasaki	Kawasaki	10	(Italy) Davide Soreca	All
WP Eric Augé	KTM	15	(Spain) Yago Martínez	3–6
Fast Eddy Racing	Triumph	16	(United Kingdom) Harry Edmondson	1–2, 4–7
KR69 World Enduro Team	Husqvarna	19	(Finland) Roni Kytönen	All
Honda Racing RedMoto Enduro Team	Honda	22	(Italy) Thomas Oldrati	6
Honda Racing RedMoto Enduro Team	Honda	23	(Italy) Samuele Bernardini	All
TM Boano/HAKX	TM	36	(Norway) Herman Ask	3
Triumph Italia Racing	Triumph	41	(Italy) Morgan Lesiardo	All
Triumph Italia Racing	Triumph	191	(United Kingdom) Alex Walton	1–4, 6
Beta UK/Apico Factory Racing	Beta	43	(United Kingdom) Daniel McCanney	4
Fantic Factory Racing Team	Fantic	47	(United Kingdom) Jed Etchells	All
MWE/Johansson MPE	Triumph	53	(Finland) Samuli Puhakainen	1
Triumph Racing Factory Team	Triumph	68	(United Kingdom) Jamie McCanney	All
Triumph Racing Factory Team	Triumph	69	(Sweden) Mikael Persson	1–6
PAR Homes Enduro Team	Gas Gas	118	(United Kingdom) Jack Edmondson	4, 7
Team Meine Racing	Yamaha	143	(Germany) Hannes Lehmann	7
Neubert Racing Team	KTM	148	(Germany) Edward Hübner	7
ET James Kawasaki	Kawasaki	206	(United States) Josh Toth	4
Johansson MPE	Triumph	207	(Sweden) Oskar Ljungström	3
Sherco Sweden/Aluns Motor	Sherco	278	(Sweden) Adam Fast	3
Enduro 2 Riders
Team	Constructor	No	Rider	Rounds
Team GTG Motogamma MC RS'77	Gas Gas	13	(Italy) Enrico Rinaldi	1–2, 4, 6
WP Eric Augé	KTM	15	(Spain) Yago Martínez	1–2
WP Eric Augé	Husqvarna	195	(Sweden) Albin Elowson	All
Sherco Factory Team	Sherco	17	(France) Théophile Espinasse	All
Kawasaki Italia/Pro Circuit	Kawasaki	18	(Italy) Giacomo Redondi	6
Honda Racing RedMoto Enduro Team	Honda	38	(Italy) Manolo Morettini	All
Honda Racing RedMoto Enduro Team	Honda	56	(France) Hugo Blanjoue	2–4
Honda Racing RedMoto Enduro Team	Honda	70	(United Kingdom) Steve Holcombe	1
Beta Factory Enduro Team	Beta	71	(United Kingdom) Nathan Watson	1–3
KTM UK/Triple D Motosport	KTM	75	(United Kingdom) Daniel Mundell	1, 4
Fantic Factory Racing Team	Fantic	97	(Sweden) Albin Norrbin	All
Gas Gas Factory Racing	Gas Gas	99	(Italy) Andrea Verona	All
TM Moto Boano Factory Enduro Team	TM	101	(France) Zach Pichon	All
KBS Team	Husqvarna	123	(Czech Republic) Kryštof Kouble	All
BlomsMX Racing Team	Husqvarna	134	(Sweden) Casper Lindholm	3
Easymotos Beja	Gas Gas	135	(Portugal) Bruno Charrua	1, 5
Team KTM Pro Racing Sport	KTM	151	(Sweden) Max Ahlin	All
Electraction TM Moto UK	TM	167	(United Kingdom) Jordan Scott	4
Yamaha Off Road Experience	Yamaha	204	(United Kingdom) Aaron Gordon	4
	Beta	224	(Italy) Mirko Ciani	6
Lillemans MC/Yamaha Scandinavia	Yamaha	242	(Sweden) Franz Löfquist	3, 7
Motorspeed	KTM	246	(Norway) Håkon Nohr	3
Red Bull KTM Factory Racing	KTM	256	(United States) Dante Oliveira	4
Enduro 3 Riders
Team	Constructor	No	Rider	Rounds
Gas Gas TRT Motorcycles	Gas Gas	2	(Spain) Marc Sans	All
Rieju Factory Team	Rieju	5	(Poland) Dominik Olszowy	All
Rieju Factory Team	Rieju	202	(France) Loïc Larrieu	2
TM Moto Boano Factory Enduro Team	TM	8	(France) Léo Le Quéré	All
Beta Factory Enduro Team	Beta	12	(United Kingdom) Brad Freeman	1
Sherco Factory Team	Sherco	51	(France) Julien Roussaly	All
Sherco Factory Team	Sherco	71	(Belgium) Antoine Magain	All
Sherco Factory Team	Sherco	76	(New Zealand) Hamish MacDonald	All
FM Factory Racing Team	Beta	62	(Germany) Luca Fischeder	All
WP Eric Augé	Gas Gas	94	(Spain) Jaume Betriu	1–2
Osellini Moto	Husqvarna	95	(Italy) Lorenzo Macoritto	6
Fantic Factory Racing Team	Fantic	98	(Italy) Matteo Pavoni	All
Green Bikes TM Racing Belgium	TM	198	(Belgium) Erik Willems	4, 6
Team Embers Åkeri	KTM	225	(Sweden) Jesper Gangfors	3
Team Sturm Zschopau	KTM	267	(Germany) Florian Görner	7

=== Riders Championship ===
Pos	Rider	Bike	Class	POR (Portugal)		ESP (Spain)		SWE (Sweden)		GBR (United Kingdom)		POR (Portugal)		ITA (Italy)		GER (Germany)		Points
1	(Spain) Josep García	KTM	Enduro 1	1	3	1	2	2	1	1	1	1	2	1	15	1	2	244
2	(Italy) Andrea Verona	Gas Gas	Enduro 2	4	2	3	1	4	2	3	6	2	1	3	1	2	1	229
3	(France) Zach Pichon	TM	Enduro 2	2	1	2	14	1	3	2	2	3	3	2	7	10	8	195
4	(New Zealand) Hamish MacDonald	Sherco	Enduro 3	5	6	4	7	3	4	6	7	4	4	7	8	4	3	161
5	(Belgium) Antoine Magain	Sherco	Enduro 3	6	8	5	4	8	6	7	9	11	10	4	5	5	9	129
6	(Italy) Samuele Bernardini	Honda	Enduro 1	7	5	9	3	13	15	5	3	9	18	9	6	3	10	117
7	(Sweden) Mikael Persson	Triumph	Enduro 1	9	7	7	8	5	5	4	4	12	5	20	DNS			96
8	(Italy) Morgan Lesiardo	Triumph	Enduro 1	18	10	6	5	15	11	15	14	5	6	5	2	16	6	95
9	(Sweden) Max Ahlin	KTM	Enduro 2	16	11	25	16	7	12	8	5	10	9	8	4	7	4	93
10	(France) Théophile Espinasse	Sherco	Enduro 2	27	Ret	11	10	9	7	27	12	6	7	6	9	8	7	84
11	(Sweden) Albin Norrbin	Fantic	Enduro 2	8	9	15	12	10	10	16	10	7	8	17	11	11	11	70
12	(United Kingdom) Nathan Watson	Beta	Enduro 2	12	4	8	6	6	8									53
13	(Germany) Jeremy Sydow	Sherco	Enduro 1	DNS	DNS					13	Ret	8	12	16	3	6	5	51
14	(France) Léo Le Quéré	TM	Enduro 3	21	14	10	9	11	9	12	17	14	13	10	13	13	Ret	48
15	(France) Julien Roussaly	Sherco	Enduro 3	13	13	16	19	12	13	11	11	15	11	12	10	12	13	46
16	(United Kingdom) Jamie McCanney	Triumph	Enduro 1	10	12	12	11	18	16	9	8	13	14	13	16	15	15	44
17	(Sweden) Albin Elowson	Husqvarna	Enduro 2	11	Ret	23	DNS	Ret	14	24	24	24	19	15	19	9	12	19
18	(United Kingdom) Steve Holcombe	Honda	Enduro 2	3	Ret													15
19	(Poland) Dominik Olszowy	Rieju	Enduro 3	17	26	14	29	22	19	23	29	20	25	11	12	Ret	DNS	11
20	(United Kingdom) Jack Edmondson	Gas Gas	Enduro 1							10	15					19	21	7
21	(Italy) Matteo Pavoni	Fantic	Enduro 3	22	18	17	13	21	17	32	25	21	21	14	14	18	19	7
22	(Germany) Luca Fischeder	Beta	Enduro 3	32	19	18	15	14	18	29	DNS	18	17	21	Ret	17	14	5
23	(United Kingdom) Jed Etchells	Fantic	Enduro 1	19	15	19	24	17	20	20	13	16	16	24	22	21	18	4
24	(Spain) Jaume Betriu	Gas Gas	Enduro 3	23	17	13	18											3
25	(Czech Republic) Kryštof Kouble	Husqvarna	Enduro 2	25	20	24	21	16	21	30	16	17	22	18	17	14	16	2
26	(United Kingdom) Daniel Mundell	KTM	Enduro 2	Ret	Ret					14	33							2
27	(United Kingdom) Brad Freeman	Beta	Enduro 3	14	DNS													2
28	(Finland) Roni Kytönen	Husqvarna	Enduro 1	15	16	21	17	19	25	22	18	22	15	22	21	20	17	2
Pos	Rider	Bike	Class	POR (Portugal)		ESP (Spain)		SWE (Sweden)		GBR (United Kingdom)		POR (Portugal)		ITA (Italy)		GER (Germany)		Points

=== Enduro 1 ===
Enduro 1 is for motorcycles up to and including 250cc, both 2-stroke and 4-stroke.

Pos	Rider	Bike	POR (Portugal)		ESP (Spain)		SWE (Sweden)		GBR (United Kingdom)		POR (Portugal)		ITA (Italy)		GER (Germany)		Points
1	(Spain) Josep García	KTM	1	1	1	1	1	1	1	1	1	1	1	4	1	1	273
2	(Italy) Samuele Bernardini	Honda	2	2	4	2	3	4	3	2	4	8	3	3	2	4	205
3	(Italy) Morgan Lesiardo	Triumph	6	4	2	3	4	3	7	6	2	3	2	1	5	3	197
4	(United Kingdom) Jamie McCanney	Triumph	4	5	5	5	6	5	4	4	6	5	4	5	4	5	162
5	(Sweden) Mikael Persson	Triumph	3	3	3	4	2	2	2	3	5	2	7	DNS			161
6	(United Kingdom) Jed Etchells	Fantic	7	6	6	8	5	6	10	5	7	7	9	8	8	7	125
7	(Finland) Roni Kytönen	Husqvarna	5	7	7	6	7	9	11	8	8	6	8	7	7	6	122
8	(Germany) Jeremy Sydow	Sherco	DNS	DNS					6	Ret	3	4	5	2	3	2	98
9	(Italy) Davide Soreca	Kawasaki	8	9	Ret	7	9	8	12	11	9	10	6	6	9	8	96
10	(United Kingdom) Harry Edmondson	Triumph	9	10	9	10			13	12	10	9	11	9	10	Ret	64
11	(United Kingdom) Alex Walton	Triumph	11	8	8	9	8	7	Ret	DNS			13	Ret			48
12	(United Kingdom) Jack Edmondson	Gas Gas							5	7					6	9	37
13	(Spain) Yago Martínez	KTM					13	13	14	Ret	11	11	10	Ret			24
14	(United Kingdom) Daniel McCanney	Beta							8	9							15
15	(United States) Josh Toth	Kawasaki							9	10							13
16	(Sweden) Oskar Ljungström	Triumph					10	10									12
17	(Germany) Edward Hübner	KTM													11	10	11
18	(Italy) Thomas Oldrati	Honda											12	10			10
19	(Norway) Herman Ask	TM					11	11									10
20	(Germany) Hannes Lehmann	Yamaha													12	11	9
21	(Sweden) Adam Fast	Sherco					12	12									8
22	(Finland) Samuli Puhakainen	Triumph	10	Ret													6
Pos	Rider	Bike	POR (Portugal)		ESP (Spain)		SWE (Sweden)		GBR (United Kingdom)		POR (Portugal)		ITA (Italy)		GER (Germany)		Points

=== Enduro 2 ===
Enduro 2 is for 4-stroke motorcycles from 255cc-450cc.

Pos	Rider	Bike	POR (Portugal)		ESP (Spain)		SWE (Sweden)		GBR (United Kingdom)		POR (Portugal)		ITA (Italy)		GER (Germany)		Points
1	(Italy) Andrea Verona	Gas Gas	3	2	2	1	2	1	2	3	1	1	2	1	1	1	255
2	(France) Zach Pichon	TM	1	1	1	5	1	2	1	1	2	2	1	3	5	4	241
3	(Sweden) Max Ahlin	KTM	7	5	10	6	4	6	3	2	5	5	4	2	2	2	177
4	(France) Théophile Espinasse	Sherco	10	Ret	4	3	5	3	9	5	3	3	3	4	3	3	166
5	(Sweden) Albin Norrbin	Fantic	4	4	5	4	6	5	5	4	4	4	6	5	6	5	163
6	(Czech Republic) Kryštof Kouble	Husqvarna	8	6	9	7	7	8	11	6	6	8	7	6	7	7	121
7	(Italy) Manolo Morettini	Honda	9	7	7	8	9	9	7	7	7	7	9	8	8	8	114
8	(Sweden) Albin Elowson	Husqvarna	5	Ret	8	DNS	Ret	7	8	9	8	6	5	7	4	6	104
9	(United Kingdom) Nathan Watson	Beta	6	3	3	2	3	4									85
10	(Italy) Enrico Rinaldi	Gas Gas	11	8	11	9			12	11			10	9			47
11	(France) Hugo Blanjoue	Honda			6	10	8	Ret	6	8							42
12	(Sweden) Franz Löfquist	Yamaha					12	12							9	9	22
13	(Portugal) Bruno Charrua	Gas Gas	12	9							Ret	9					18
14	(United Kingdom) Steve Holcombe	Honda	2	Ret													17
15	(United Kingdom) Daniel Mundell	KTM	Ret	Ret					4	13							16
16	(Spain) Yago Martínez	KTM	Ret	10	12	11											15
17	(United States) Dante Oliveira	KTM							10	10							12
18	(Sweden) Casper Lindholm	Husqvarna					10	10									12
19	(Italy) Mirko Ciani	Beta											11	10			11
20	(Norway) Håkon Nohr	KTM					11	11									10
21	(Italy) Giacomo Redondi	Kawasaki											8	Ret			8
22	(United Kingdom) Aaron Gordon	Yamaha							13	12							7
	(United Kingdom) Jordan Scott	TM							Ret	DNS							0
Pos	Rider	Bike	POR (Portugal)		ESP (Spain)		SWE (Sweden)		GBR (United Kingdom)		POR (Portugal)		ITA (Italy)		GER (Germany)		Points

=== Enduro 3 ===
Enduro 3 is for 2-stroke motorcycles over 255cc and 4-stroke motorcycles over 455cc.

Pos	Rider	Bike	POR (Portugal)		ESP (Spain)		SWE (Sweden)		GBR (United Kingdom)		POR (Portugal)		ITA (Italy)		GER (Germany)		Points
1	(New Zealand) Hamish MacDonald	Sherco	1	1	1	2	1	1	1	1	1	1	2	2	1	1	271
2	(Belgium) Antoine Magain	Sherco	2	2	2	1	2	2	2	2	2	2	1	1	2	2	247
3	(France) Julien Roussaly	Sherco	3	3	6	7	4	4	3	3	4	3	5	3	3	3	189
4	(France) Léo Le Quéré	TM	6	4	3	3	3	3	4	4	3	4	3	5	4	Ret	176
5	(Italy) Matteo Pavoni	Fantic	7	6	7	4	6	5	8	5	7	6	6	6	6	5	141
6	(Poland) Dominik Olszowy	Rieju	5	9	5	9	7	7	5	6	6	7	4	4	Ret	DNS	120
7	(Germany) Luca Fischeder	Beta	10	7	8	5	5	6	7	DNS	5	5	7	Ret	5	4	119
8	(Spain) Marc Sans	Gas Gas	9	8	9	10	8	8	9	7	8	8	10	8	7	6	109
9	(Spain) Jaume Betriu	Gas Gas	8	5	4	6											42
10	(Belgium) Erik Willems	TM							6	8			9	Ret			25
11	(Germany) Florian Görner	KTM													8	7	17
12	(Italy) Lorenzo Macoritto	Husqvarna											8	7			17
13	(France) Loïc Larrieu	Rieju			10	8											14
14	(United Kingdom) Brad Freeman	Beta	4	DNS													13
15	(Sweden) Jesper Gangfors	KTM					9	Ret									7
Pos	Rider	Bike	POR (Portugal)		ESP (Spain)		SWE (Sweden)		GBR (United Kingdom)		POR (Portugal)		ITA (Italy)		GER (Germany)		Points

== Junior ==
All riders competing in the Junior world championships must be younger than 23 years of age on 1 January of the year of the championship.

=== Participants ===
Junior 1 Riders
Team	Constructor	No	Rider	Rounds
WP Eric Augé	Gas Gas	4	(United Kingdom) Sam Davies	All
WP Eric Augé	KTM	42	(Chile) Juan Pablo Clericus	1–3
WP Eric Augé	KTM	93	(Israel) Inbar Selinger	1–2, 5–7
Motissimo	Triumph	7	(Spain) Liam Sanjuan	5
Rieju Factory Team	Rieju	14	(Spain) Alex Puey	1–5
ET James Sherco Enduro Team	Sherco	20	(United Kingdom) Jack Probert	4
Yamaha Off Road Experience	Yamaha	27	(United Kingdom) Charlie Chater	4
Atomic Moto	Beta	33	(France) Clement Clauzier	1–6
Beta UK/John Lee Motorcycles	Beta	35	(United Kingdom) Callum Hughes	1, 4, 6–7
JRB Offroad Center Racing Team	Sherco	48	(Spain) Jan Olivera	1–2, 5
Triumph Italia Racing	Triumph	63	(Italy) Luca Colorio	1–4, 6–7
Johansson MPE	Triumph	65	(Sweden) Arvid Modin	1–6
Johansson MPE	Triumph	270	(Sweden) Emil Löf	7
Johansson MPE	Triumph	282	(Australia) William Dennett	7
CEC Racing	KTM	74	(Sweden) Alfred Karlsson	3
Snellman Motosport/Entrophy	Beta	84	(Finland) Juho Ahokas	3
KTM Scandinavia/CEC Racing	KTM	86	(Sweden) Kalle Ahlin	1, 3
Honda Racing RedMoto	Honda	89	(New Zealand) Bailey Basalaj	5
TM Moto Boano Factory Enduro Team	TM	90	(Italy) Manuel Verzeroli	All
Team Beta Oxmoto	Beta	96	(France) Leo Joyon	All
Offroadshop Kölbach Racing Team	Beta	104	(Germany) Fynn Hannemann	1, 7
Sherco Academy France	Sherco	105	(France) Thibault Giraudon	All
John Shirt Motorcycles/Ace Suspension	Gas Gas	117	(United Kingdom) Charlie Crossland	4
EastMX Gas Gas	Gas Gas	122	(Finland) Kimi Koskinen	1–3
Entrophy Enduro Team	Beta	129	(Italy) Vittorio Bellucci	1–2, 6
SJP Moto	KTM	137	(United Kingdom) Jacob Potts	4, 7
Beta Portugal/Moto Espinha	Beta	155	(Portugal) Rúben Ferreira	1, 4–7
	KTM	206	(Finland) Jonni Hujala	7
Beta Motorcycles Scandinavia	Beta	212	(Sweden) Edvin Wiberg	3
Team Sturm Zschopau	KTM	215	(Germany) Sky Maddox Dombrowski	7
Team Sturm Zschopau	KTM	285	(Germany) Kenny Riedel	7
Team Sturm Zschopau	KTM	291	(Germany) Jeremy Göthel	7
Sherco Academy Deutschland	Sherco	218	(Germany) Erik Schmidt	7
	KTM	223	(Mexico) Alberto Ramón González	4–6
	KTM	231	(Sweden) William Eriksson	3, 7
Sherco Sweden	Sherco	235	(Sweden) Albin Berglund	3
Team Triple One	Yamaha	248	(Sweden) Oliver Sedelius	3
Africa Dream Racing	Gas Gas	259	(Italy) Pietro Degiacomi	6
Mascot Motor/Max Skagert Racing	Yamaha	266	(Sweden) Max Skagert	3
Steve Plain Motorcycles	Beta	276	(United Kingdom) Kris Price	4
Red Bull KTM Factory Racing	KTM	281	(Australia) Angus Riordan	4
	Beta	282	(Italy) Simone Savoldelli	6
Junior 2 Riders
Team	Constructor	No	Rider	Rounds
MGR Kawasaki	Kawasaki	11	(Australia) Kyron Bacon	1–5
Rieju Factory Team	Rieju	14	(Spain) Alex Puey	6–7
Rieju Factory Team	Rieju	119	(Italy) Lorenzo Bernini	All
Rieju Factory Team	Rieju	188	(Spain) Bruno Bozzo	1
RFME Spain National Team	Gas Gas	28	(Spain) Albert Fontova	All
Fantic Factory Racing Team	Fantic	34	(Italy) Kevin Cristino	All
Fantic Factory Racing Team	Fantic	54	(Sweden) Axel Semb	All
PAR Homes Enduro	Gas Gas	55	(United Kingdom) Sion Evans	1
Atomic Moto	Beta	64	(France) Diego Haution	All
Atomic Moto	Beta	66	(France) Maxime Clauzier	1–4, 7
SixLyon Bikes	Husqvarna	67	(Spain) Marti Escofet	1
Entrophy Enduro Team	Beta	80	(Italy) Davide Mei	All
Entrophy Enduro Team	Beta	152	(Czech Republic) Matěj Škuta	All
KBS Team	Sherco	100	(Czech Republic) Jaroslav Kalný	All
Moto Veci/Platinum X Designs/KTM Púchov	KTM	115	(Slovakia) Lukáš Trško	1
WP Eric Augé	KTM	126	(United Kingdom) Samuel Hughes	5–7
John Shirt Motorcycles	KTM	133	(United Kingdom) Alfie Webb	4, 7
	KTM	179	(Sweden) Kalle Hindström	3
	KTM	201	(Sweden) Anton Karlsson	3
Team Bonneton2Roues Fantic	Fantic	205	(France) Dorian Simon	2, 6
	Beta	208	(Italy) Samuli Boano	6
Team Sturm Zschopau	KTM	210	(Germany) Domenik Nieschalk	7
Team Sturm Zschopau	KTM	228	(Germany) Luca Reinhold	7
	Sherco	220	(Sweden) Fredrik Bengtsson	3
KTM Team Pro Racing Sport	KTM	238	(Italy) Giulio Nava	6
	Sherco	240	(Italy) Stefano Giacobini	6
Sherco Academy Deutschland	Sherco	241	(Czech Republic) Matyas Chlum	7
	Husqvarna	243	(Italy) Tommaso Morucci	6
Husqvarna Motorcycles Scandinavia	Husqvarna	250	(Sweden) Alfons Lindström	3
Team Enduro Fleischer	Fantic	253	(Germany) Pascal Sadecki	4, 7
Yamaha MWE Enduro Team	Yamaha	269	(Sweden) Marcel Tara	3
Keenan Construction	Gas Gas	280	(United Kingdom) Jack Keenan	4, 7
	Beta	286	(Germany) Milan Schmüser	7
TNT Squadra Corse KTM	KTM	294	(Italy) Riccardo Fabris	6

=== Riders Championship ===
Pos	Rider	Bike	Class	POR (Portugal)		ESP (Spain)		SWE (Sweden)		GBR (United Kingdom)		POR (Portugal)		ITA (Italy)		GER (Germany)		Points
1	(Sweden) Axel Semb	Fantic	Junior 2	4	4	1	1	1	1	3	2	5	4	6	2	1	2	226
2	(Italy) Kevin Cristino	Fantic	Junior 2	2	3	5	3	3	5	1	1	1	1	1	1	Ret	1	224
3	(France) Leo Joyon	Beta	Junior 1	3	2	4	2	4	4	2	3	3	2	3	6	2	3	209
4	(France) Thibault Giraudon	Sherco	Junior 1	6	5	2	5	5	3	4	6	2	3	2	4	3	5	186
5	(Italy) Manuel Verzeroli	TM	Junior 1	5	6	3	4	6	6	6	7	7	8	5	3	5	6	152
6	(Italy) Luca Colorio	Triumph	Junior 1	17	9	6	8	7	7	8	5			9	5	4	10	99
7	(France) Clement Clauzier	Beta	Junior 1	7	10	8	7	8	11	10	8	4	5	4	DNS			96
8	(France) Diego Haution	Beta	Junior 2	18	7	10	11	13	12	5	21	8	6	8	12	7	7	86
9	(Australia) Kyron Bacon	Kawasaki	Junior 2	1	1	7	18	2	2	Ret	DNS	Ret	DNS					83
10	(Italy) Davide Mei	Beta	Junior 2	8	13	12	23	9	9	9	10	9	9	10	9	10	11	80
11	(Spain) Alex Puey	Rieju	Junior 1	14	17	13	9	16	15	17	16	6	7	Ret	7	8	8	57
12	(Czech Republic) Matěj Škuta	Beta	Junior 2	Ret	8	9	19	12	8	14	9	15	Ret	7	8	Ret	DNS	54
13	(Czech Republic) Jaroslav Kalný	Sherco	Junior 2	9	11	16	16	11	10	11	11	Ret	14	13	10	9	13	54
14	(Spain) Albert Fontova	Gas Gas	Junior 2	15	12	11	10	14	13	12	12	11	10	14	Ret	12	9	53
15	(United Kingdom) Sam Davies	Gas Gas	Junior 1	13	15	18	13	15	17	13	14	13	13	Ret	DNS	6	23	29
16	(Italy) Lorenzo Bernini	Rieju	Junior 2	10	20	19	14	19	16	15	15	14	12	18	11	17	12	25
17	(Australia) Angus Riordan	KTM	Junior 1							7	4							22
18	(France) Maxime Clauzier	Beta	Junior 2	Ret	Ret	14	6	10	14	Ret	DNS					Ret	DNS	20
19	(Australia) William Dennett	Triumph	Junior 1													11	4	18
20	(Sweden) Arvid Modin	Triumph	Junior 1	16	14	17	15	18	23	16	13	10	11	16	DNS			17
21	(Chile) Juan Pablo Clericus	KTM	Junior 1	11	Ret	Ret	12	Ret	DNS									9
22	(France) Dorian Simon	Fantic	Junior 2			15	24							11	DNS			6
23	(Portugal) Rúben Ferreira	Beta	Junior 1	12	Ret					23	18	16	15	19	16	Ret	18	5
24	(Czech Republic) Matyas Chlum	Sherco	Junior 2													13	14	5
25	(Italy) Riccardo Fabris	KTM	Junior 2											12	Ret			4
26	(Spain) Liam Sanjuan	Triumph	Junior 1									12	Ret					4
27	(Italy) Giulio Nava	KTM	Junior 2											15	13			4
28	(Germany) Fynn Hannemann	Beta	Junior 1	19	23											14	DNS	2
29	(United Kingdom) Samuel Hughes	KTM	Junior 2									17	18	Ret	14	16	20	2
30	(Germany) Pascal Sadecki	Fantic	Junior 2							24	22					18	15	1
31	(Germany) Milan Schmüser	Beta	Junior 2													15	Ret	1
32	(United Kingdom) Callum Hughes	Beta	Junior 1	Ret	18					Ret	Ret			20	15	19	16	1
Pos	Rider	Bike	Class	POR (Portugal)		ESP (Spain)		SWE (Sweden)		GBR (United Kingdom)		POR (Portugal)		ITA (Italy)		GER (Germany)		Points

=== Junior 1 ===
Junior 1 is for motorcycles up to and including 250cc, both 2-stroke and 4-stroke.

Pos	Rider	Bike	POR (Portugal)		ESP (Spain)		SWE (Sweden)		GBR (United Kingdom)		POR (Portugal)		ITA (Italy)		GER (Germany)		Points
1	(France) Leo Joyon	Beta	1	1	3	1	1	2	1	1	2	1	2	4	1	1	259
2	(France) Thibault Giraudon	Sherco	3	2	1	3	2	1	2	4	1	2	1	2	2	3	240
3	(Italy) Manuel Verzeroli	TM	2	3	2	2	3	3	3	5	5	5	4	1	4	4	203
4	(Italy) Luca Colorio	Triumph	10	4	4	5	4	4	5	3			5	3	3	5	147
5	(France) Clement Clauzier	Beta	4	5	5	4	5	5	6	6	3	3	3	DNS			135
6	(United Kingdom) Sam Davies	Gas Gas	7	7	8	8	6	7	7	8	8	7	Ret	DNS	5	11	103
7	(Spain) Alex Puey	Rieju	8	9	6	6	7	6	9	9	4	4					94
8	(Sweden) Arvid Modin	Triumph	9	6	7	9	9	11	8	7	6	6	6	DNS			92
9	(Portugal) Rúben Ferreira	Beta	6	Ret					13	11	9	8	8	6	Ret	7	60
10	(Israel) Inbar Selinger	KTM	Ret	Ret	10	12					10	9	11	Ret	9	8	43
11	(United Kingdom) Callum Hughes	Beta	Ret	10					Ret	Ret			9	5	8	6	42
12	(Finland) Kimi Koskinen	Gas Gas	Ret	8	9	10	10	8									35
13	(Australia) Angus Riordan	KTM							4	2							30
14	(Italy) Vittorio Bellucci	Beta	12	13	Ret	11							7	7			30
15	(Australia) William Dennett	Triumph													6	2	27
16	(Spain) Jan Olivera	Sherco	14	11	11	13					11	10					26
17	(Mexico) Alberto Ramón González	KTM							16	13	12	11	12	9			23
18	(Sweden) Kalle Ahlin	KTM	13	12			8	9									22
19	(Chile) Juan Pablo Clericus	KTM	5	Ret	Ret	7	Ret	DNS									20
20	(Germany) Fynn Hannemann	Beta	11	14											7	DNS	16
21	(Italy) Pietro Degiacomi	Gas Gas											10	8			14
22	(Finland) Jonni Hujala	KTM													11	9	12
23	(Germany) Sky Maddox Dombrowski	KTM													10	10	12
24	(United Kingdom) Charlie Crossland	Gas Gas							11	10							11
25	(Sweden) Edvin Wiberg	Beta					11	10									11
26	(Spain) Liam Sanjuan	Triumph									7	Ret					9
27	(Italy) Simone Savoldelli	Gas Gas											13	10			9
28	(Germany) Kenny Riedel	KTM													12	12	8
29	(United Kingdom) Kris Price	Beta							12	12							8
30	(Sweden) Alfred Karlsson	KTM					12	12									8
31	(United Kingdom) Charlie Chater	Yamaha							10	DNS							6
32	(Germany) Erik Schmidt	Sherco													14	13	5
33	(Sweden) William Eriksson	KTM					14	13							Ret	DNS	5
34	(Sweden) Oliver Sedelius	Yamaha					13	14									5
35	(United Kingdom) Jacob Potts	KTM							15	Ret					13	Ret	4
36	(Sweden) Emil Löf	Triumph													15	14	3
37	(United Kingdom) Jack Probert	Sherco							14	Ret							2
38	(Sweden) Max Skagert	Yamaha					15	15									2
	(Finland) Juho Ahokas	Beta					Ret	DNS									0
	(Sweden) Albin Berglund	Sherco					Ret	DNS									0
	(New Zealand) Bailey Basalaj	Honda									Ret	DNS					0
	(Germany) Jeremy Göthel	KTM													Ret	DNS	0
Pos	Rider	Bike	POR (Portugal)		ESP (Spain)		SWE (Sweden)		GBR (United Kingdom)		POR (Portugal)		ITA (Italy)		GER (Germany)		Points

=== Junior 2 ===
Junior 2 is for motorcycles over 255cc, both 2-stroke and 4-stroke.

Pos	Rider	Bike	POR (Portugal)		ESP (Spain)		SWE (Sweden)		GBR (United Kingdom)		POR (Portugal)		ITA (Italy)		GER (Germany)		Points
1	(Sweden) Axel Semb	Fantic	3	3	1	1	1	1	2	2	2	2	2	2	1	2	249
2	(Italy) Kevin Cristino	Fantic	2	2	2	2	3	3	1	1	1	1	1	1	Ret	1	238
3	(France) Diego Haution	Beta	8	4	5	5	8	7	3	10	3	3	4	8	2	3	164
4	(Italy) Davide Mei	Beta	4	8	7	10	4	5	4	4	4	4	5	5	5	6	155
5	(Czech Republic) Jaroslav Kalný	Sherco	5	6	10	7	6	6	5	5	Ret	7	8	6	4	8	126
6	(Spain) Albert Fontova	Gas Gas	7	7	6	4	9	8	6	6	5	5	9	Ret	6	5	126
7	(Czech Republic) Matěj Škuta	Beta	Ret	5	4	9	7	4	7	3	7	Ret	3	4	Ret	DNS	114
8	(Italy) Lorenzo Bernini	Rieju	6	9	11	6	10	10	8	7	6	6	11	7	10	7	110
9	(Australia) Kyron Bacon	Kawasaki	1	1	3	8	2	2	Ret	DNS	Ret	DNS					97
10	(Spain) Alex Puey	Rieju											Ret	3	3	4	43
11	(France) Maxime Clauzier	Beta	Ret	Ret	8	3	5	9	Ret	DNS					Ret	DNS	41
12	(United Kingdom) Jack Keenan	Gas Gas							9	8					12	11	24
13	(France) Dorian Simon	Fantic			9	11							6	DNS			22
14	(Germany) Pascal Sadecki	Fantic							11	11					11	10	21
15	(Czech Republic) Matyas Chlum	Sherco													7	9	16
16	(Italy) Giulio Nava	KTM											10	9			13
17	(United Kingdom) Alfie Webb	Gas Gas							10	9					Ret	DNS	13
18	(Slovakia) Lukáš Trško	KTM	9	10													13
19	(United Kingdom) Samuel Hughes	KTM													9	12	11
20	(United Kingdom) Sion Evans	Gas Gas	10	11													11
21	(Italy) Riccardo Fabris	KTM											7	Ret			9
22	(Italy) Stefano Giacobini	Sherco											13	10			9
23	(Sweden) Alfons Lindström	Husqvarna					12	11									9
24	(Sweden) Anton Karlsson	KTM					11	12									9
25	(Germany) Milan Schmüser	Beta													8	Ret	8
26	(Italy) Tommaso Morucci	Husqvarna											14	11			7
27	(Sweden) Fredrik Bengtsson	Sherco					14	13									5
28	(Italy) Samuli Boano	Beta											12	Ret			4
29	(Germany) Domenik Nieschalk	KTM													13	Ret	3
30	(Sweden) Kalle Hindström	KTM					13	Ret									3
	(Spain) Marti Escofet	Husqvarna	Ret	DNS													0
	(Spain) Bruno Bozzo	Rieju	Ret	DNS													0
	(Sweden) Marcel Tara	Yamaha					Ret	DNS									0
	(Germany) Luca Reinhold	KTM													Ret	DNS	0
Pos	Rider	Bike	POR (Portugal)		ESP (Spain)		SWE (Sweden)		GBR (United Kingdom)		POR (Portugal)		ITA (Italy)		GER (Germany)		Points

== Youth ==
All riders competing in the Youth world championship must be younger than 21 years of age on 1 January of the year of the championship.

Only 2-stroke motorcycles between 100cc-125cc can be used.

=== Participants ===
Youth Riders
Team	Constructor	No	Rider	Rounds
RFME Spain National Team	Gas Gas	7	(Spain) Liam Sanjuan	2
RFME Spain National Team	Gas Gas	81	(Spain) Yago Dominguez	All
RFME Spain National Team	Beta	111	(Spain) Ramon Godino	2–5, 7
KTM Spain	KTM	21	(Spain) Pol Guerrero	2, 5
	Gas Gas	24	(France) Gabin Allemand	All
TM Moto Boano Factory Enduro Team	TM	32	(Italy) Alberto Elgari	All
TM Moto Boano Factory Enduro Team	TM	46	(Italy) Gabriele Giordano	1–2, 5–6
Team KTM Pro Racing Sport	KTM	44	(France) Romain Dagna	All
Team KTM Pro Racing Sport	KTM	61	(Italy) Valentino Corsi	1–4
Costa Ligure TM Youth Team	TM	50	(Italy) Alessio Berger	5–6
Beta UK/S3 Clothing	Beta	58	(United Kingdom) Fraiser Lampkin	4, 6
Sherco Academy France	Sherco	60	(Belgium) Hugo Vukcevic	1–3, 6
Sherco Academy France	Sherco	120	(France) Armand Rouquette	2
Team Sherco España	Sherco	77	(Spain) Aleix Saumell	1–6
Lunigiana Enduro Team	Gas Gas	79	(Italy) Nicola Salvini	1–4, 6–7
Fantic Factory Racing Team	Fantic	83	(Italy) Pietro Scardina	All
Fantic Factory Racing Team	Fantic	88	(Italy) Riccardo Pasquato	All
Team Specia	Fantic	85	(Chile) José Ramdohr	1–6
Osellini Moto	Husqvarna	87	(Slovakia) Tomas Merasičky	6
Osellini Moto	Husqvarna	299	(Italy) Niko Guastini	6
Mekonomen Finland	KTM	107	(Finland) Ukko Laaksonen	1, 3, 5
Team GP Motors	Beta	108	(France) Benjamin Sicard	1–2, 4–7
Entrophy Enduro Team	Beta	121	(Italy) Luca Piersigilli	All
Entrophy Enduro Team	Beta	254	(Italy) Manuel Savi	6
Electraction TM Moto	TM	124	(United Kingdom) William Barnett	7
PAR Homes Enduro	Gas Gas	125	(United Kingdom) Rees Jones	1–4, 6–7
WP Eric Augé	KTM	126	(United Kingdom) Samuel Hughes	1
WP Eric Augé	Sherco	255	(Mexico) Miguel Ruiz de Chavez	6–7
Team Bonneton2Roues Fantic	Fantic	132	(France) Valentin Mersin	2, 6
Team Bonneton2Roues Fantic	Fantic	218	(France) Matteo Arrieta	2, 6
Team Bonneton2Roues Fantic	Fantic	281	(France) Raphaël Raynaud	2, 6
JRB Off Road Center/Sherco Spain	Sherco	144	(Spain) Raúl Sánchez	1
Sherco Portugal/Moto Dreams	Sherco	145	(Portugal) Francisco Leite	1
Motopalvelu	KTM	206	(Finland) Jonni Hujala	3
ET James Sherco Enduro Team	Sherco	211	(United Kingdom) Ben Zeale	1, 4
FR Motosport	Beta	215	(Italy) Mattia Barbieri	6
Beta Scandinavia NTEK Racing	Beta	216	(Sweden) Robin Gunnarsson	3
HH Racing Enduro Team	Sherco	219	(Sweden) Hugo Andersson	3
Team Sturm Zschopau	Fantic	230	(Germany) Erik Neubert	7
Team Sturm Zschopau	KTM	232	(Germany) Emil Keßler	7
	KTM	235	(France) Léo Lavesvre	2, 6
NSA Motors 2Ruote	Husqvarna	236	(Italy) Simone Cagnoni	6
	TM	243	(Chile) Cristóbal Huerta	5
ADAC Ostwestfalen-Lippe	Beta	244	(Germany) Max Bölte	7
	Fantic	262	(Sweden) Axel Plogner	3
	Yamaha	263	(Italy) Alfredo Buelli	6
CEC Motorcycles/CEC Racing	Yamaha	265	(Sweden) Hugo Hellström	3
Beta Trueba	Beta	268	(Spain) Guillem Sucarrats	5–6
BlomsMX	Husqvarna	275	(Sweden) William Almen	3
PGR Enduro Team	TM	283	(Sweden) Mille Söderblom	3
Team Triple One	Husqvarna	296	(Sweden) Oscar Sahlin	3
Agon Squadra Corse	TM	298	(Italy) Gabriele Melchiorri	6
BvZ Racing Team	KTM	299	(Germany) Willi Damerau	7

=== Riders Championship ===
Pos	Rider	Bike	POR (Portugal)		ESP (Spain)		SWE (Sweden)		GBR (United Kingdom)		POR (Portugal)		ITA (Italy)		GER (Germany)		Points
1	(France) Romain Dagna	KTM	1	3	1	2	3	3	1	1	1	2	Ret	1	2	3	231
2	(Italy) Pietro Scardina	Fantic	3	2	3	1	2	1	15	5	2	3	1	2	1	1	225
3	(Italy) Alberto Elgari	TM	2	1	2	3	1	2	2	11	Ret	1	2	3	3	2	212
4	(France) Gabin Allemand	Gas Gas	5	5	6	4	5	7	3	2	7	6	6	8	4	4	160
5	(Italy) Riccardo Pasquato	Fantic	7	8	9	7	12	9	5	4	3	4	3	4	5	5	146
6	(Spain) Yago Domínguez	Gas Gas	Ret	12	10	11	8	6	4	7	8	9	4	5	Ret	6	104
7	(Chile) José Ramdohr	Fantic	4	4	8	9	7	10	6	6	4	5	Ret	DNS			100
8	(Italy) Valentino Corsi	KTM	6	7	5	5	4	4	7	3							91
9	(Spain) Aleix Saumell	Sherco	8	6	4	14	6	5	12	DNS	6	7	7	Ret			86
10	(Italy) Luca Piersigilli	Beta	12	9	7	6	11	13	8	8	9	8	15	14	Ret	9	79
11	(Spain) Ramon Godino	Beta			17	12	10	11	10	10	15	13			6	7	50
12	(Italy) Nicola Salvini	Gas Gas	15	10	16	13	15	16	9	Ret			22	15	7	8	36
13	(France) Benjamin Sicard	Beta	11	Ret	Ret	16			14	9	12	Ret	Ret	16	9	Ret	25
14	(Finland) Ukko Laaksonen	KTM	9	13			16	12			11	11					24
15	(United Kingdom) Rees Jones	Gas Gas	14	18	19	17	19	20	11	Ret			20	19	8	10	21
16	(Italy) Gabriele Giordano	TM	13	17	15	Ret					10	10	14	13			21
17	(Italy) Simone Cagnoni	Husqvarna											10	7			15
18	(Sweden) Robin Gunnarsson	Beta					9	8									15
19	(United Kingdom) Fraiser Lampkin	Beta							Ret	DNS			9	9			14
20	(Chile) Cristóbal Huerta	TM									5	14					13
21	(France) Matteo Arrieta	Fantic			18	15							8	12			13
22	(Spain) Liam Sanjuan	Gas Gas			12	8											12
23	(France) Valentin Mersin	Fantic			Ret	DNS							5	Ret			11
24	(France) Armand Rouquette	Sherco			11	10											11
25	(Italy) Gabriele Melchiorri	TM											Ret	6			10
26	(United Kingdom) William Barnett	TM													10	12	10
27	(France) Léo Lavesvre	KTM			Ret	19							11	11			10
28	(Italy) Niko Guastini	Husqvarna											13	10			9
29	(Belgium) Hugo Vukcevic	Sherco	10	15	Ret	Ret	18	15					16	21			8
30	(Germany) Emil Keßler	KTM													11	13	8
31	(Spain) Guillem Sucarrats	Beta									13	12	19	25			7
32	(Germany) Willi Damerau	KTM													12	14	6
33	(Mexico) Miguel Ruiz de Chavez	Sherco											21	23	Ret	11	5
34	(United Kingdom) Samuel Hughes	KTM	Ret	11													5
35	(Slovakia) Tomas Merasičky	Husqvarna											12	18			4
36	(Finland) Jonni Hujala	KTM					14	14									4
37	(Germany) Max Bölte	Beta													13	Ret	3
38	(United Kingdom) Ben Zeale	Sherco	17	16					13	Ret							3
39	(Sweden) Hugo Andersson	Sherco					13	17									3
40	(France) Raphaël Raynaud	Fantic			13	Ret							17	22			3
41	(Italy) Alessio Berger	TM									14	15	Ret	17			3
42	(Spain) Pol Guerrero	KTM			14	18											2
43	(Portugal) Francisco Leite	Sherco	16	14													2
44	(Germany) Erik Neubert	Fantic													Ret	15	1
	(Sweden) Oscar Sahlin	Husqvarna					17	19									0
	(Italy) Manuel Savi	Beta											18	20			0
	(Sweden) William Almen	Husqvarna					21	18									0
	(Sweden) Mille Söderblom	TM					20	23									0
	(Sweden) Hugo Hellström	Yamaha					22	21									0
	(Sweden) Axel Plogner	Fantic					23	22									0
	(Italy) Mattia Barbieri	Beta											23	24			0
	(Italy) Alfredo Buelli	Yamaha											24	26			0
	(Spain) Raúl Sánchez	Sherco	Ret	Ret													0
Pos	Rider	Bike	POR (Portugal)		ESP (Spain)		SWE (Sweden)		GBR (United Kingdom)		POR (Portugal)		ITA (Italy)		GER (Germany)		Points

== Women ==
Competitors in the Women's world championship can compete on any capacity of motorcycle of their choosing.

=== Participants ===
Women Riders
Team	Constructor	No	Rider	Rounds
K21Moto/Sport Police Nationale	KTM	403	(France) Marine Lemoine	1, 3–4
Kiwi's Bike Shop Racing Team	Sherco	404	(United Kingdom) Nieve Holmes	1–3
Rieju Factory Team	Rieju	416	(United Kingdom) Rosie Rowett	All
Rieju Factory Team	Rieju	417	(United States) Rachel Gutish	All
WPM Motors	KTM	422	(Norway) Vilde Holt	All
Rogers Hill Raceway/Beta UK	Beta	428	(United Kingdom) Emily Hall	1–2
RFME Spain National Team	Rieju	429	(Spain) Maria San Miguel	All
Honda Racing RedMoto Enduro Team	Honda	443	(Italy) Francesca Nocera	All
	Beta	467	(Germany) Celine Heistermann	4
Jetmar Husqvarna Portugal	Husqvarna	474	(Portugal) Joana Gonçalves	All
Atomic Moto	Beta	495	(France) Justine Martel	All
Junior Women Riders
Team	Constructor	No	Rider	Rounds
Beta Scandinavia	Beta	405	(Sweden) Hanna Lagher	4
	Sherco	407	(France) Lorna Lafont	All
SHC Meltewitz	Sherco	415	(Germany) Lea Meier	1–2, 4
Electraction TM Moto UK	TM	444	(United Kingdom) Elizabeth Tett	All
	Fantic	445	(United Kingdom) Delun Davies	1–3
	Husqvarna	481	(Sweden) Matilda Ahlström	1
Gmoto Store	KTM	484	(Poland) Maja Kozłowska	4

=== Riders Championship ===
Pos	Rider	Bike	POR (Portugal)		GBR (United Kingdom)		POR (Portugal)		GER (Germany)		Points
1	(United States) Rachel Gutish	Rieju	2	2	2	2	1	2	1	1	145
2	(United Kingdom) Rosie Rowett	Rieju	4	5	1	1	2	4	3	2	126
3	(Italy) Francesca Nocera	Honda	1	1	3	3	Ret	1	2	Ret	107
4	(France) Justine Martel	Beta	7	7	4	4	5	8	4	3	91
5	(Norway) Vilde Holt	KTM	9	4	6	6	4	3	10	4	86
6	(United Kingdom) Nieve Holmes	Sherco	3	3	5	5	3	10			73
7	(Portugal) Joana Gonçalves	Husqvarna	5	8	9	10	8	6	6	6	70
8	(France) Marine Lemoine	KTM	6	6			7	5	5	5	62
9	(France) Lorna Lafont	Sherco	11	11	11	7	6	9	7	7	59
10	(United Kingdom) Elizabeth Tett	TM	8	10	8	9	10	7	8	9	59
11	(Spain) Maria San Miguel	Rieju	9	9	7	8	9	11	9	8	58
12	(United Kingdom) Delun Davies	Fantic	Ret	13	12	12	11	12			20
13	(Germany) Lea Meier	Sherco	Ret	14	13	Ret			13	12	12
14	(United Kingdom) Emily Hall	Beta	Ret	DNS	10	11					11
15	(Poland) Maja Kozłowska	KTM							11	11	10
16	(Sweden) Hanna Lagher	Beta							14	10	8
17	(Sweden) Matilda Ahlström	Husqvarna	12	12							8
18	(Germany) Celine Heistermann	Beta							12	13	7
Pos	Rider	Bike	POR (Portugal)		GBR (United Kingdom)		POR (Portugal)		GER (Germany)		Points

=== Junior Women ===
Pos	Rider	Bike	POR (Portugal)		GBR (United Kingdom)		POR (Portugal)		GER (Germany)		Points
1	(France) Lorna Lafont	Sherco	2	2	2	1	1	2	1	1	148
2	(United Kingdom) Elizabeth Tett	TM	1	1	1	2	2	1	2	2	148
3	(United Kingdom) Delun Davies	Fantic	4	4	3	3	3	3			73
4	(Germany) Lea Meier	Sherco	Ret	5	4	Ret			4	5	48
5	(Sweden) Matilda Ahlström	Husqvarna	3	3							30
6	(Poland) Maja Kozłowska	KTM							3	4	28
7	(Sweden) Hanna Lagher	Beta							5	3	26
Pos	Rider	Bike	POR (Portugal)		GBR (United Kingdom)		POR (Portugal)		GER (Germany)		Points

== Open World Cup ==
=== Participants ===
Open 2-stroke Riders
Team	Constructor	No	Rider	Rounds
WPM Motors	KTM	422	(Norway) Vilde Holt	3
	Beta	502	(Germany) Matthias Albrecht	7
KBS Team	Gas Gas	503	(Czech Republic) Robert Friedrich	1–4, 6–7
Wrap2Strokes/Fura Racing Developments	KTM	504	(France) Florian Furtado	1–6
	Gas Gas	505	(Italy) Matteo Grigis	6
	KTM	506	(Switzerland) Michael Besse	7
	Gas Gas	507	(Italy) Thomas Grigis	6
D-Vision Moto/WieczoreckGP TM Moto Racing Team	TM	508	(Germany) Max Schäfer	1–3, 6–7
Offroadshop Kölbach Racing Team	Beta	509	(Germany) Fritz Hunger	7
Offroadshop Kölbach Racing Team	Beta	555	(Germany) Tom Kölbach	1–3, 7
	Beta	510	(Italy) Michele Mazzetto	6
SMP Schapfl Racing	Beta	511	(Germany) Tobias Werther	7
	Sherco	512	(Czech Republic) Jiri Hadek	7
	KTM	513	(Germany) Marcel Richter	7
Beta Motor France/JLD2Roues	Beta	515	(France) Logan Merlier	1–2, 4–7
Frisk Suspension	Sherco	516	(Sweden) Viktor Toftén	3
	Beta	517	(Italy) Giorgio Bigoni	6
KTM Spain	KTM	518	(Spain) Jordi Quer	1–2, 5–6
	Beta	521	(Germany) Louis Sieber	7
Rieju Official	Rieju	522	(Spain) Jordi Galera	All
KTM GST Berlin Racing	KTM	524	(Germany) Leon Thoms	7
Elite Moto 15 Enduro Team	KTM	525	(France) Yann Dupic	1–6
	Husqvarna	526	(Sweden) Carl Olsson	3
Manchester Xtreme	KTM	527	(United Kingdom) Stuart Owen	4
Absolutmx.se	KTM	529	(Sweden) Hampus Högström	3
	Beta	530	(France) Pierre Sanchez	5
ADAC Nordbayern	Sherco	531	(Germany) Luca Wiesinger	7
Myr Racing	Husqvarna	532	(Germany) Arvid Meyer	7
	TM	533	(Germany) Toni Georgi	7
Mefo Sport Racing Team	KTM	534	(Germany) Paul-Erik Huster	7
Beta Belgium/Pro Bike	Beta	535	(Belgium) Maxime Warenghien	7
Motors Novi Korona Team	TM	536	(Norway) Herman Ask	1
ADAC Sachsen	Beta	545	(Germany) Paul Hempel	7
Van der Vegt – TM Racing Nederland	TM	546	(Netherlands) Thierry Pittens	4
Rieju Italia	Rieju	551	(Italy) Sara Traini	6
	Fantic	551	(Germany) Lorenz Schreck	7
AL860 Motosport	Beta	560	(Italy) Andrea La Scala	1–3, 5–7
	Yamaha	561	(Sweden) Nils Anderberg	3
AMS-Dirtbikes.de	Beta	564	(Germany) Maximilian Müller	7
AMS-Dirtbikes.de	Beta	566	(Germany) Max Stradtner	7
Stombergs Racing	KTM	569	(Sweden) Carl Andersson	3
	Husqvarna	570	(Germany) Lukas Hedlin	7
Motos Nuñez Motor/Sherco Spain	Sherco	574	(Spain) Breogán Touriñán	1–2
Metallbau Weixler/Champion Lubes	Sherco	576	(Germany) Florian Geisenhofer	7
Enduro Fleischer	Fantic	577	(Germany) Collin Lang	7
	KTM	578	(Hungary) Roland Liszka	1, 3, 6–7
TM Moto UK/GLH Scaffolding	TM	580	(United Kingdom) Gethin Humphreys	1–5, 7
Overveld Off Road Parts	Rieju	585	(Netherlands) Simon Koning	1, 3
	Beta	586	(Italy) Joseph Questi	6
	Sherco	588	(Switzerland) Cédric Evard	6
	Sherco	591	(Hungary) Dániel Tádics	1, 3, 6
	KTM	595	(Italy) Simone Calamari	6
Classic Car Club Manhattan/Beta USA	Beta	596	(Germany) Tim Apolle	1–4
Open 4-stroke Riders
Team	Constructor	No	Rider	Rounds
	Husqvarna	481	(Sweden) Matilda Ahlström	3
	KTM	602	(France) Iban Etchegoimberry	2
	Fantic	605	(France) Corentin Poutignat	1–4
Triumph Clermont 63	Triumph	606	(France) Franck Luberriaga	1–2, 4–5, 7
Kiwi's Bike Shop Racing Team	Sherco	607	(United Kingdom) Henry Harman	1–2, 4, 7
Kiwi's Bike Shop Racing Team	Sherco	608	(United Kingdom) Ryan Burton	1
	KTM	610	(Sweden) Ramus Håkansson	3
RC Motorsport	Husqvarna	611	(France) Enzo Cozzi	4–6
	Yamaha	612	(Sweden) Axel Westher	3
Frisk Suspension	Sherco	613	(Sweden) Robert Toftén	3
Team A-Moto	Kawasaki	614	(Sweden) Måns Dalén	3
Motobi Enduro Team	Husqvarna	615	(Italy) Daniele Matti	6
Team Sturm Zschopau	KTM	616	(Germany) Kevin Nieschalk	7
Team Sturm Zschopau	KTM	619	(Germany) Karl Weigelt	7
Team Sturm Zschopau	KTM	691	(Germany) Benjamin Richter	7
	Beta	617	(Germany) Eddie Findling	3–4
	Gas Gas	618	(Italy) Thomas Bastiani	6
Beta UK/John Lee Motorcycles	Beta	621	(United Kingdom) Ross Danby	4
	Husqvarna	625	(Sweden) Melker Oscarsson	3
	Yamaha	626	(France) Charles Cottet	1–2, 6
Imago Fritid	KTM	631	(Sweden) Sebastian Cederbrant	3
Lifbergs Motor	Beta	633	(Sweden) Martin Ringdahl	3
QBG Racing Sherco	Sherco	634	(United Kingdom) Ben Thomson	All
	Gas Gas	636	(Czech Republic) Filip Fiala	7
	Husqvarna	637	(Sweden) Wiktor Eriksson	3
38 Racing	KTM	638	(Germany) Maik Schubert	7
JCR Offroad Performance	KTM	639	(Switzerland) Sebastian Von Burg	7
SGS Racing	Beta	640	(Italy) Lorenzo Staccioli	1–3, 6
Beta Motor Belgium	Beta	641	(Belgium) Martin Robert	4
	Triumph	642	(Italy) Mattia Carpi	6
	Husqvarna	645	(Sweden) Anton Jonsson	3
	KTM	646	(Netherlands) Wesley Pittens	4
Nilssons Motor/Kawasaki Sweden	Kawasaki	647	(Sweden) Emil Löfquist	3, 7
Honda Racing Time Shop	Honda	649	(Italy) Mirko Spandre	6
Motors Novi Korona Team	Honda	650	(Poland) Aleksander Bracik	1, 7
KTM Pro Racing Sport	KTM	651	(Sweden) Robin Wiss	1–3, 5–7
	Fantic	654	(United Kingdom) Joshua Kirby	7
	Husqvarna	655	(Italy) Nicola Lanza	6
Andre Motors	Husqvarna	656	(Netherlands) Kaiya Brouwer	3
Team GP Motors	Beta	661	(France) Alex Pichaud	1–5, 7
	KTM	666	(Sweden) Erik Wahlström	3
Enduro Fleischer	Husqvarna	667	(Germany) Ricardo Feig	7
Team Kadelack Gas Gas	Gas Gas	668	(Germany) Yanik Spachmüller	7
	Gas Gas	669	(Spain) Eric García	2
MWE/Johansson MPE	Triumph	670	(Sweden) Emil Löf	1–3, 6
	Fantic	671	(Germany) Robin Brauer	7
	KTM	675	(Italy) Diego Ballardini	6
Stombergs Racing	Kawasaki	677	(Sweden) Jonas Karlsson	3
	Gas Gas	678	(Czech Republic) Jakub Balatka	7
Offroadshop Kölbach Racing Team	Beta	680	(Germany) Patrick Irmscher	7
Beta Motor France/Team Beta Oxmoto National	Beta	681	(France) Nathan Boulenc	All
DB Motorsport	Gas Gas	686	(United Kingdom) Freddie Davis	1, 4, 7
TM Moto UK	TM	688	(United Kingdom) Joel Tett	1, 4, 7
FP-Engineering GMBH	TM	689	(Germany) Garry Dittmann	2–3, 6
Triumph Offroad Barcelona/Motissimo	Triumph	690	(Spain) David Riera	5
	KTM	692	(Germany) Markus Gantke	7
RB Motorsports	Fantic	693	(Germany) Stefan Tietgen-Wollschläger	3, 7
TM Boano Factory Racing	TM	694	(United States) Luke Ross	6
	KTM	696	(Italy) Paolo Cima Politi	6
Italian Racing Parts	Fantic	699	(Brazil) Patrik Capila	1–3, 5–6

=== Open 2-stroke ===
Open 2-Stroke is for 2-stroke motorcycles of any engine capacity.

Pos	Rider	Bike	POR (Portugal)		ESP (Spain)		SWE (Sweden)		GBR (United Kingdom)		POR (Portugal)		ITA (Italy)		GER (Germany)		Points
1	(Hungary) Roland Liszka	KTM	1	1			1	1					1	1	1	1	160
2	(France) Yann Dupic	KTM	3	2	2	2	3	4	1	1	1	1	Ret	DNS			146
3	(Spain) Jordi Quer	KTM	2	3	1	1					2	2	7	4			128
4	(United Kingdom) Gethin Humphreys	TM	4	5	3	3	2	2	2	2	3	5			4	5	126
5	(Spain) Jordi Galera	Rieju	5	8	5	6	5	5	Ret	3	Ret	3	3	3	2	2	116
6	(Czech Republic) Robert Friedrich	Gas Gas	8	9	6	7	7	7	3	5			5	7	5	3	91
7	(France) Florian Furtado	KTM	11	10	8	5	8	Ret	4	6	4	4	4	6			91
8	(Germany) Tim Apolle	Beta	7	7	4	4	6	3	5	7							89
9	(Italy) Andrea La Scala	Beta	Ret	12	9	9	10	9			5	6	8	9	12	8	65
10	(Hungary) Dániel Tádics	Sherco	9	4			4	6					6	5			64
11	(France) Logan Merlier	Beta	14	15	11	10			8	8	7	8	15	14	22	22	48
12	(Italy) Matteo Grigis	Gas Gas											2	2			34
13	(Germany) Max Schäfer	TM	12	14	10	8	12	11					14	13	15	19	34
14	(Belgium) Maxime Warenghien	Beta													3	6	25
15	(Netherlands) Thierry Pittens	TM							6	4							23
16	(Norway) Herman Ask	TM	6	6													20
17	(Spain) Breogán Touriñán	Sherco	10	11	7	DNS											20
18	(Germany) Leon Thoms	KTM													10	4	19
19	(Czech Republic) Jiri Hadek	Sherco													6	7	19
20	(France) Pierre Sanchez	Beta									6	7					19
21	(Germany) Arvid Meyer	Husqvarna													7	10	15
22	(Germany) Paul-Erik Huster	KTM													8	9	15
23	(Italy) Thomas Grigis	Gas Gas											9	8			15
24	(Sweden) Carl Andersson	KTM					9	8									15
25	(Germany) Maximilian Müller	Beta													9	12	11
26	(Italy) Giorgio Bigoni	Beta											11	10			11
27	(Sweden) Hampus Högström	KTM					11	10									11
28	(Italy) Michele Mazzetto	Beta											10	12			10
29	(Germany) Florian Geisenhofer	Sherco													11	11	10
30	(Netherlands) Simon Koning	Rieju	13	13			Ret	12									10
31	(United Kingdom) Stuart Owen	KTM							7	Ret							9
32	(Switzerland) Cédric Evard	Sherco											12	11			9
33	(Germany) Tom Kölbach	Beta	15	16	12	DNS	15	15							25	Ret	7
34	(Sweden) Viktor Toftén	Sherco					13	13									6
35	(Germany) Fritz Hunger	Beta													13	14	5
36	(Italy) Joseph Questi	Beta											13	15			4
37	(Sweden) Nils Anderberg	Yamaha					14	14									4
38	(Germany) Luca Wiesinger	Sherco													16	13	3
39	(Germany) Paul Hempel	Beta													14	18	2
40	(Germany) Lukas Hedlin	Husqvarna													27	15	1
	(Italy) Simone Calamari	KTM											16	16			0
	(Norway) Vilde Holt	KTM					17	16									0
	(Germany) Max Stradtner	Beta													17	16	0
	(Sweden) Carl Olsson	Husqvarna					16	DNS									0
	(Italy) Sara Traini	Rieju											17	17			0
	(Germany) Tobias Werther	Beta													19	17	0
	(Germany) Collin Lang	Fantic													18	20	0
	(Switzerland) Michael Besse	KTM													20	21	0
	(Germany) Marcel Richter	KTM													21	23	0
	(Germany) Toni Georgi	TM													23	Ret	0
	(Germany) Louis Sieber	Beta													24	24	0
	(Germany) Lorenz Schreck	Fantic													28	25	0
	(Germany) Matthias Albrecht	Beta													26	26	0
Pos	Rider	Bike	POR (Portugal)		ESP (Spain)		SWE (Sweden)		GBR (United Kingdom)		POR (Portugal)		ITA (Italy)		GER (Germany)		Points

=== Open 4-stroke ===
Open 4-Stroke is for 4-stroke motorcycles of any engine capacity.

Pos	Rider	Bike	POR (Portugal)		ESP (Spain)		SWE (Sweden)		GBR (United Kingdom)		POR (Portugal)		ITA (Italy)		GER (Germany)		Points
1	(Brazil) Patrik Capila	Fantic	1	2	1	1	1	1			2	1	1	1			160
2	(France) Nathan Boulenc	Beta	3	1	12	3	7	5	1	4	1	3	2	2	Ret	DNS	139
3	(France) Alex Pichaud	Beta	4	3	2	4	3	3	2	1	Ret	8			1	Ret	132
4	(Sweden) Robin Wiss	KTM	9	9	4	2	4	6			5	4	8	5	4	6	101
5	(United Kingdom) Ben Thomson	Sherco	6	8	5	12	5	7	6	5	6	5	6	4	9	2	94
6	(France) Franck Luberriaga	Triumph	5	6	6	9			5	6	4	6			7	4	88
7	(France) Corentin Poutignat	Fantic	2	4	13	5	2	2	Ret	DNS							78
8	(Poland) Aleksander Bracik	Honda	7	5											2	3	52
9	(France) Charles Cottet	Yamaha	Ret	Ret	3	6							4	6			48
10	(Germany) Garry Dittmann	TM			9	8	12	9					10	9	Ret	10	45
11	(France) Enzo Cozzi	Husqvarna							10	8	7	7	11	11			42
12	(United Kingdom) Henry Harman	Sherco	11	10	10	10			8	9					15	15	40
13	(Italy) Lorenzo Staccioli	Beta	10	12	8	7	16	12					13	12			38
14	(Germany) Yanik Spachmüller	Gas Gas													3	1	35
15	(Spain) David Riera	Triumph									3	2					32
16	(United Kingdom) Ross Danby	Beta							3	2							32
17	(Sweden) Emil Löfquist	Kawasaki					6	4							19	7	32
18	(Italy) Mirko Spandre	Honda											3	3			30
19	(Netherlands) Wesley Pittens	KTM							4	3							28
20	(United Kingdom) Joel Tett	TM	Ret	11					9	7					13	16	24
21	(Germany) Kevin Nieschalk	KTM													5	5	22
22	(Germany) Patrick Irmscher	Beta													6	8	18
23	(Italy) Daniele Matti	Husqvarna											7	7			18
24	(United Kingdom) Ryan Burton	Sherco	8	7													17
25	(United Kingdom) Freddie Davis	Gas Gas	12	13					12	11					18	19	16
26	(Germany) Karl Weigelt	KTM													8	9	15
27	(United States) Luke Ross	TM											9	8			15
28	(Sweden) Sebastian Cederbrant	KTM					9	8									15
29	(France) Iban Etchegoimberry	KTM			7	11											14
30	(Sweden) Axel Westher	Yamaha					10	10									12
31	(Italy) Thomas Bastiani	Gas Gas											5	Ret			11
32	(Germany) Maik Schubert	KTM													10	11	11
33	(Germany) Eddie Findling	Beta					19	16	11	10							11
34	(Italy) Nicola Lanza	Husqvarna											12	10			10
35	(Germany) Stefan Tietgen-Wollschläger	Fantic					11	11							Ret	DNS	10
36	(Belgium) Martin Robert	Beta							7	DNS							9
37	(Sweden) Melker Oscarsson	Husqvarna					8	Ret									8
38	(Czech Republic) Filip Fiala	Gas Gas													11	13	8
39	(United Kingdom) Joshua Kirby	Fantic													12	12	8
40	(Sweden) Emil Löf	Triumph	Ret	14	Ret	13	15	18					16	14			8
41	(Spain) Eric García	Gas Gas			11	Ret											5
42	(Italy) Mattia Carpi	Triumph											14	13			5
43	(Sweden) Wiktor Eriksson	Husqvarna					18	13									3
44	(Sweden) Robert Toftén	Sherco					13	17									3
45	(Germany) Luc Hunziker	Beta													Ret	14	2
46	(Germany) Benjamin Richter	KTM													14	DNS	2
47	(Netherlands) Kaiya Brouwer	Husqvarna					Ret	14									2
48	(Sweden) Martin Ringdahl	Beta					14	Ret									2
49	(Italy) Diego Ballardini	KTM											15	15			2
50	(Sweden) Rasmus Håkansson	KTM					21	15									1
	(Italy) Paolo Cima Politi	KTM											17	16			0
	(Switzerland) Sebastian Von Burg	KTM													16	Ret	0
	(Czech Republic) Jakub Balatka	Gas Gas													17	17	0
	(Sweden) Anton Jonsson	Husqvarna					17	DNS									0
	(Germany) Robin Brauer	Fantic													Ret	18	0
	(Sweden) Måns Dalén	Kawasaki					20	19									0
	(Germany) Ricardo Feig	Husqvarna													Ret	Ret	0
	(Sweden) Matilda Ahlström	Husqvarna					Ret	DNS									0
	(Sweden) Erik Wahlström	KTM					Ret	DNS									0
	(Sweden) Jonas Karlsson	Kawasaki					Ret	DNS									0
	(Germany) Markus Gantke	KTM													Ret	DNS	0
Pos	Rider	Bike	POR (Portugal)		ESP (Spain)		SWE (Sweden)		GBR (United Kingdom)		POR (Portugal)		ITA (Italy)		GER (Germany)		Points
