= Penedo Furado =

Penedo Furado Waterfall and lake
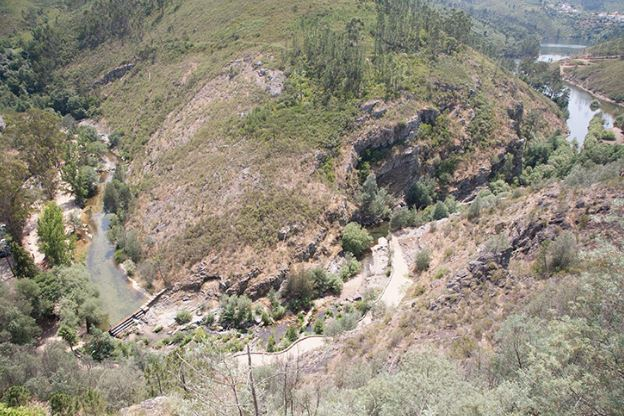
- Penedo Furado Waterfall and lake
- Interactive map of Penedo Furado Waterfall and lake
- Location: Vila de Rei, Portugal
- Watercourse: Codes River

Penedo Furado is a waterfall and lake located in the parish of Vila de Rei, in Vila de Rei Municipality in the Castelo Branco district, Portugal.

== See also ==
- List of waterfalls
