= Rieju =

Spanish motorcycle manufacturer

- Industry: Automotive
- Founded: 1934
- Founder: Luis Riera Carré; Jaime Juanola Farres
- Headquarters: Figueres, Girona, Catalonia, Spain
- Area served: Worldwide
- Products: Motorcycles
- Website: https://rieju.com

Rieju is a Spanish manufacturer of mopeds and motorcycles. It is based in Figueres, Spain. They specialise in small-displacement motorcycles (between 49 cc and 500 cc). Their products are available in almost all European countries.

== History ==
In 1934, two young entrepreneurs, Luis Riera Carré and Jaime Juanola Farrés, founded a company to manufacture bicycle accessories. The name RIEJU came from the first letters of each of their middle names (RIEra + JUanola).

They bought some land and started to build a factory, but the Spanish Civil War thwarted their plans. The Spanish Republican Government confiscated the unfinished building and used it as a truck depot. A second storey was built above the existing premises during the war and was considered a payment of interests when the facilities were returned.

In 1940, once the war was over, Rieju resumed its industrial activity making bicycle accessories.

In 1942, Rieju was established as a Private Limited Company (Sociedad Limitada) with a capital of 1 million pesetas. They started to build their first bicycle models as well as bicycle components. The company then had 35 employees and an average of 30 bicycles were built each week.

In 1947 Rieju built their first moped, adding to one of their bicycles an auxiliary 38 cc four-stroke engine (built by Serwa of France) coupled to the rear wheel. This model had a power of 1 HP and a maximum speed of around 40 km/h. Two years later, in 1949, Rieju launched the "No. 2" model, now with a more powerful engine and a gearbox designed in-house. Later models (No.3, No.4, etc.) evolved the vehicle to give it a "motorcycle look".

In 1964 Rieju reached an agreement with Minarelli to manufacture their engines under licence, and launched the "Jaca" model, with 3.5 HP and a top speed of 70 km/h, but this was limited to 40 km/h due to moped regulations.

The landmark Jaca model was evolved throughout the 1960s and 1970s, giving birth to the Confort and TT models. In 1978, Rieju developed a moped with automatic transmission but it was not successful.

Production kept increasing steadily throughout the 1980s, with new and more varied models, placing Rieju among the top moped sellers in Spain. Also, Rieju bikes won several prizes in international Enduro competitions, raising the profile of the marque.

In 1994, the company opened itself to other markets and started exporting their models across Europe. By 2006, exports represented about 60% of their sales.

In March 2011, the manufacturer’s first electric scooter, the Rieju Mius, entered production at the plant in Catalonia. Also in 2011 saw the launch of many new Rieju machines, most notably the new RS3 50 and RS3 125LC. They are made in Spain and are powered by Yamaha-Minarelli engines.

In 2020 Rieju purchased the rights to Gas Gas's off-road Two-stroke motorcycle models.

In 2021, Rieju launched their first electric two moped the "Nuuk CargoPro", a 6 kW electric delivery scooter with a 100–120 kilometre range with a top speed of 90 km/h.

In 2022, Rieju launched their second electric scooter, the "E-City" designed for urban driving. The scooter was released with two variations, a 50 cc equivalent which comes with a top speed of 45 km/h with a range of up to 70 kilometres, and a 125 cc variation with a top speed of 75 km/h and a range of 160 kilometres.

In july 2024 Rieju acquired the spanish electric scooters manufacturer Win Life Electric Vehicles S.L. including its intellectual property and the rights of the RAY 7.7 Electric Scooter.

== Competitions ==
The first victory of Rieju in Endurance was in the 1979 and 1980 season, when Jordi Piferrer Taulé, riding a Marathon machine, won the 80cc category of the Spanish Championship.

Rieju also won in various national enduro and off-road competitions, including the Enduro World Championship, where it won the Women Championship in the 2024, 2025 and 2026 season.

== Enduro models ==
=== 2020–2024 ===
Rieju continued production of the previous Gas Gas off-road line. The bikes benefited from improved manufacturing techniques during the crossover period with KTM as they worked together while transitioning the GasGas name. They offered three versions of Enduro bikes ranging from Pro to beginner. The "Pro" version was their top of the line bike. The Racing and Ranger versions were lower priced models catering to the enthusiast and beginner respectively.

In 2022 Rieju introduced the MR200 by equipping their MR250 with a lower displacement cylinder, head and crankshaft to capitalize on the success of the Beta 200 RR.

In 2023 Rieju introduced their first 4-stroke enduro bike. The MR Pro 125 comes equipped with a 15HP, liquid cooled, four-stroke engine supplied by the Italian company Minarelli.

2024 Enduro Models

2T

- MR Pro: 200 cc, 250 cc & 300 cc
- MR Racing: 200 cc, 250 cc & 300 cc
- MR Ranger: 200 cc & 300 cc

4T

- MR Pro 125

The 2024 models are available in 2026 via the Rieju website but they are not designated as 2026 models.

=== 2025–present ===
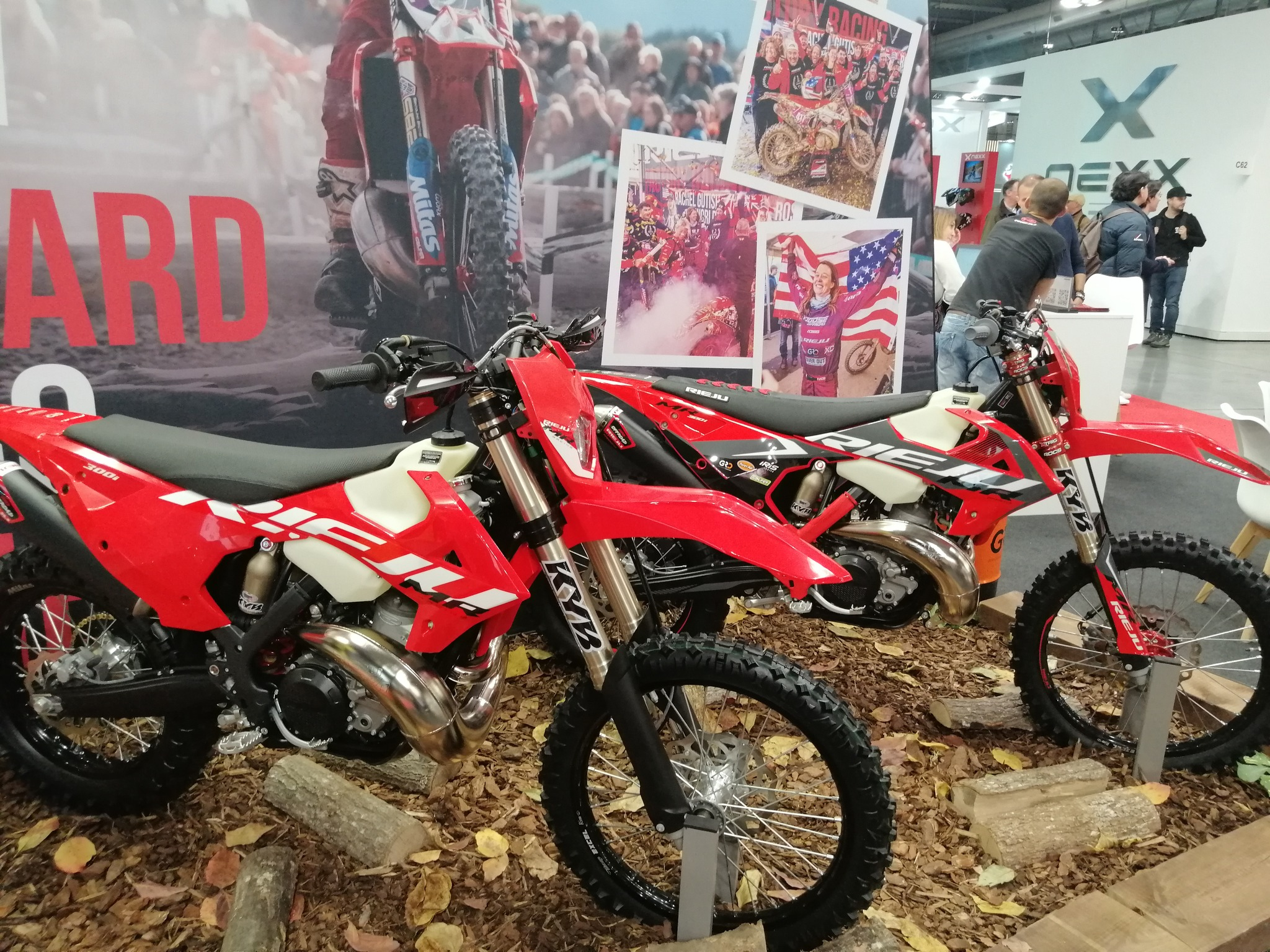
Rieju MR 300i

Prior to their 2026 release Rieju invested in development of redesigned in-house 2T motors.

In 2026 Rieju released their MR300i employing a similar chassis with an in-house redesigned engine which lacks a kick starter. The new engine contains a counter balancer (reducing vibrations), an electronic power valve, a diaphragm clutch and electronic fuel injection with dual fuel injectors. The MR300i is available in both Pro and Racing editions.

The 2026 line-up included MR Pro 300i and MR Racing 300i two-strokes as well as the MR Pro 125 four-stroke.

For 2027 Rieju updated the 300i models. New versions of the MR300i Racing and MR 300i Pro are joined by in the line-up by the MR 300i Hard Enduro.

== Adventure/Dual-Purpose models ==
Adventure/ Dual-sport bikes by type
Adventure	Dual Sport
Aventura 125	MRT 50 Pro (2T)
Aventura Rally 307	MRT 50 (2T)
Aventura 500	Marathon 125 Pro (4T)
Xplora 557S / 557X	Marathon 125 Europa (4T)
Xplora 707S / 707X	Tango 125i (4T)

== Road models ==
Reiju road bikes by type
Standard/Naked	Sport	Motard	Scooter/Moped
NKD 125	RS1 50	MRT 50 SM	Ray 7.7
	RS2 50	MRT 50 SM Pro	RS 50
Tango 125i Scrambler	RS3 50	MRT 125 SM Pro	X-Over 125
Century	RS2 125	MRT 125 SM Europa	X-Over 357
	RS3 125		

== Gallery ==
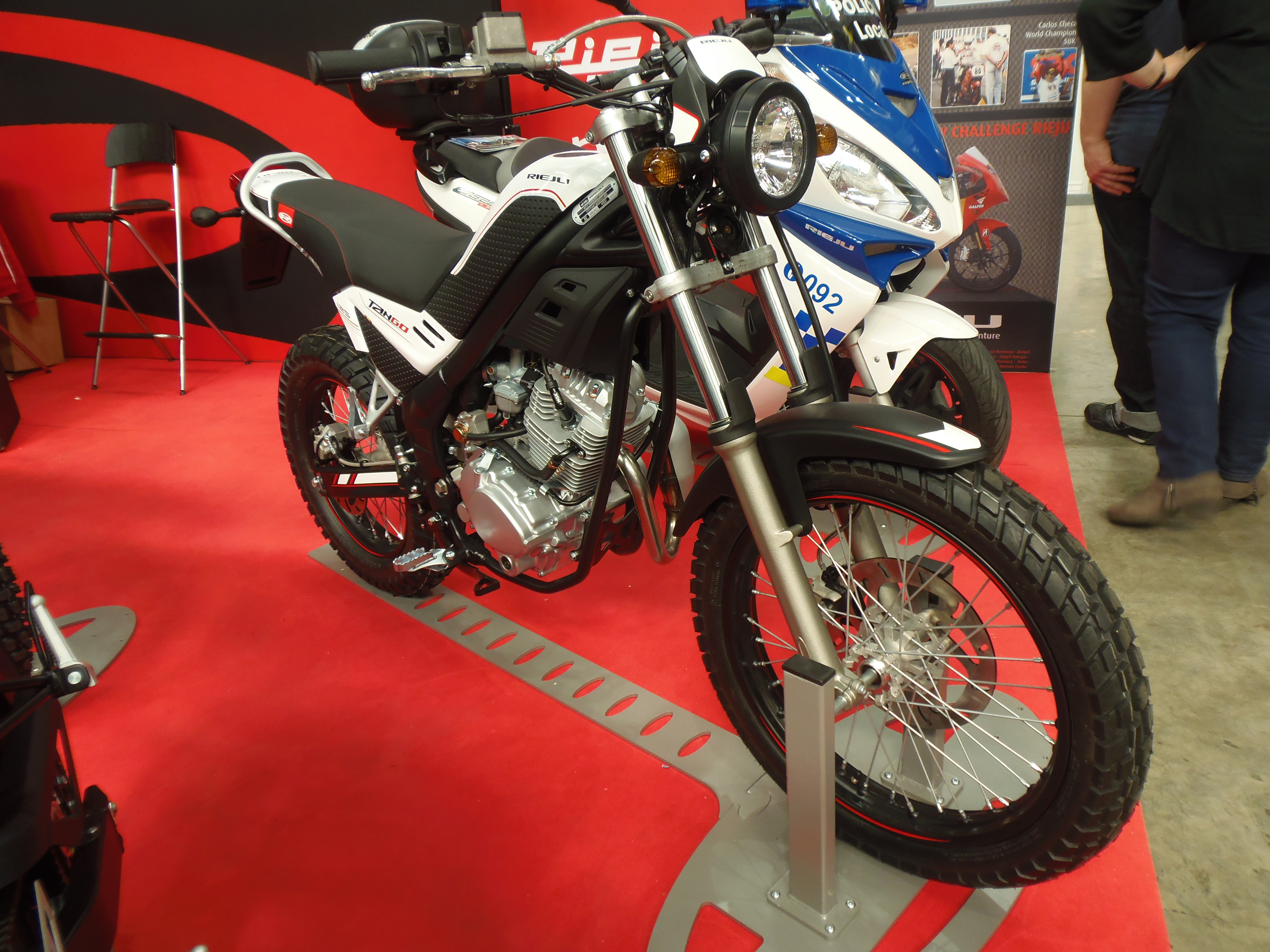
Tango 125i

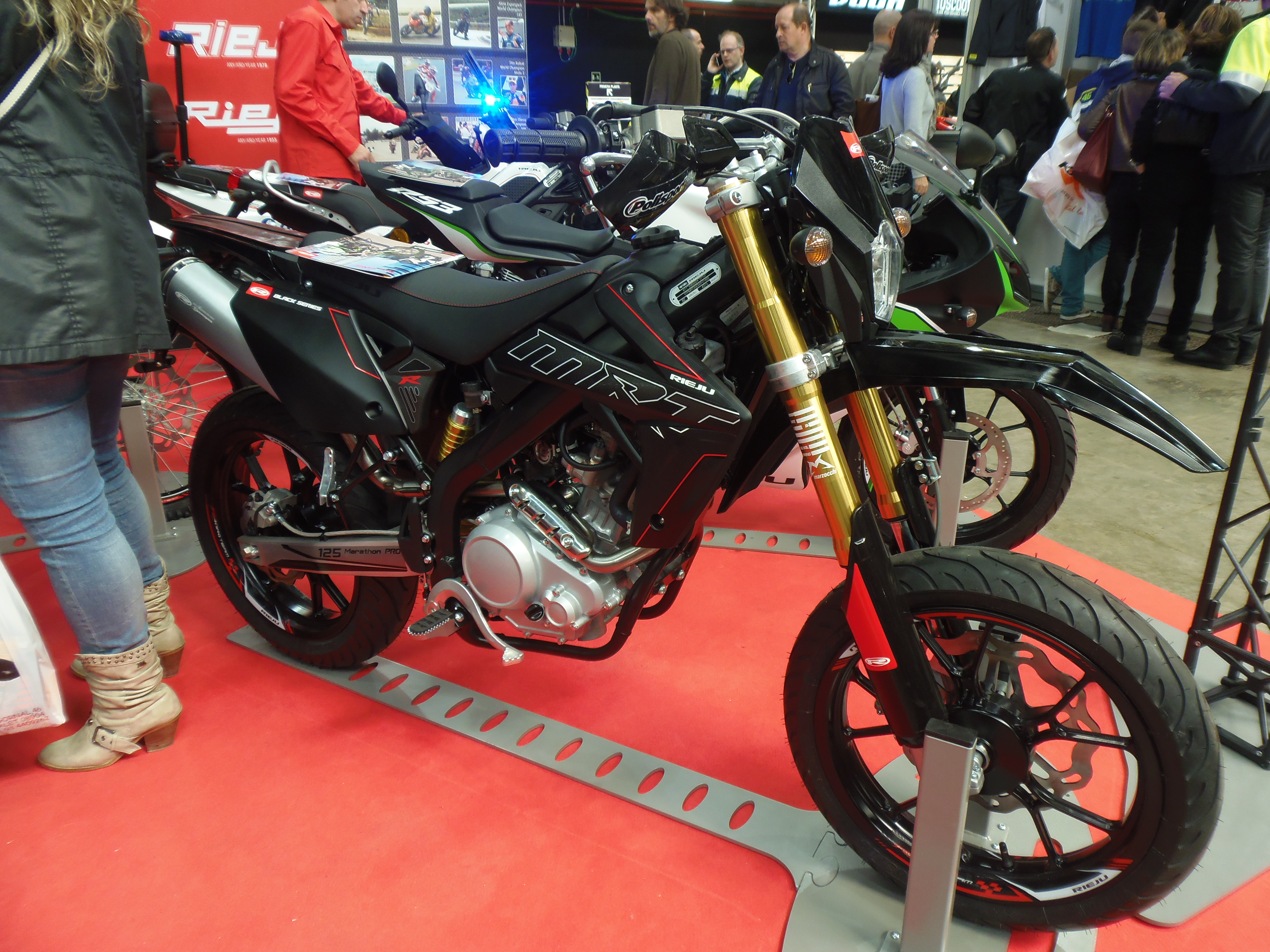
Marathon 125 Pro

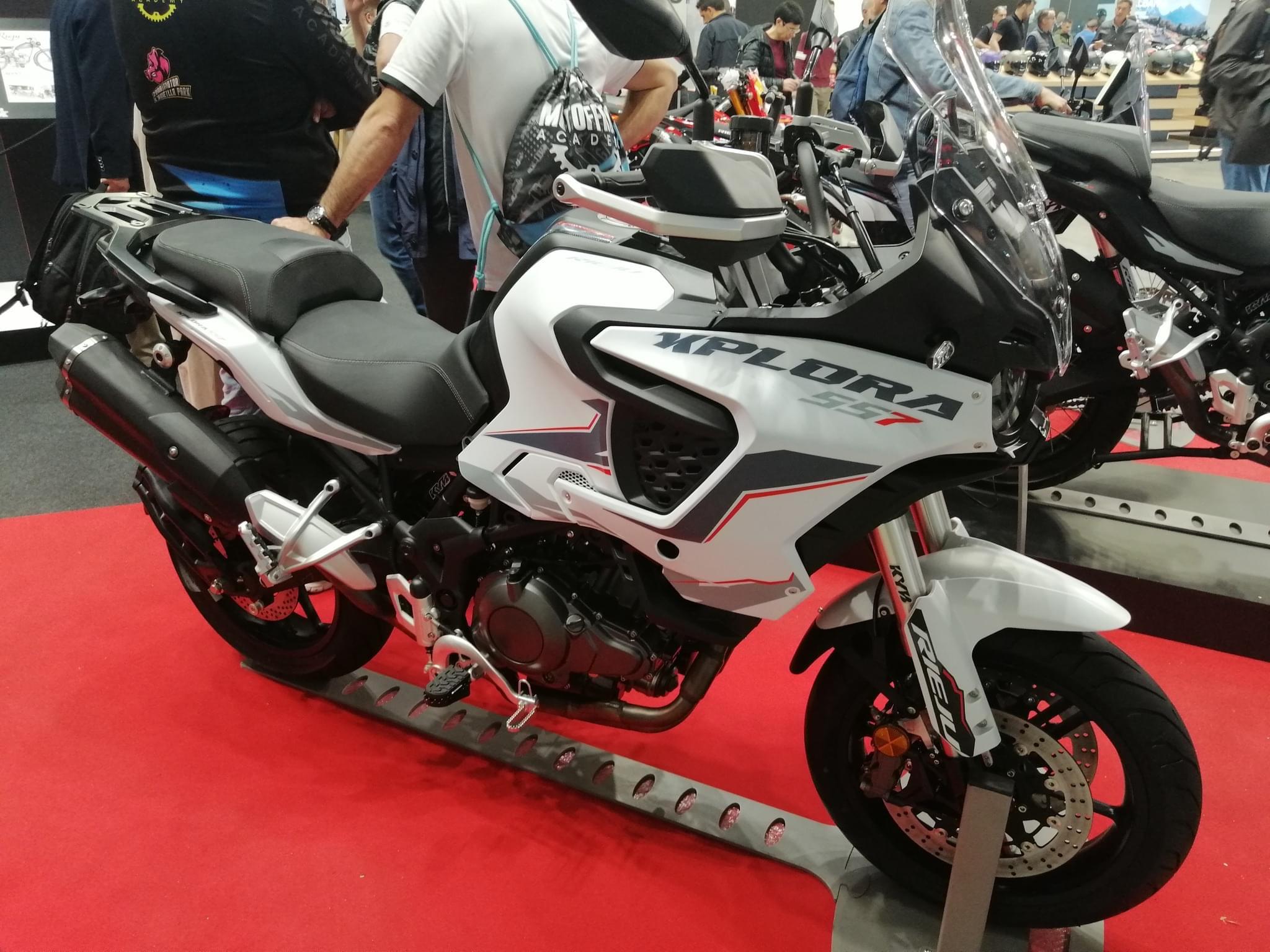
Xplora 557

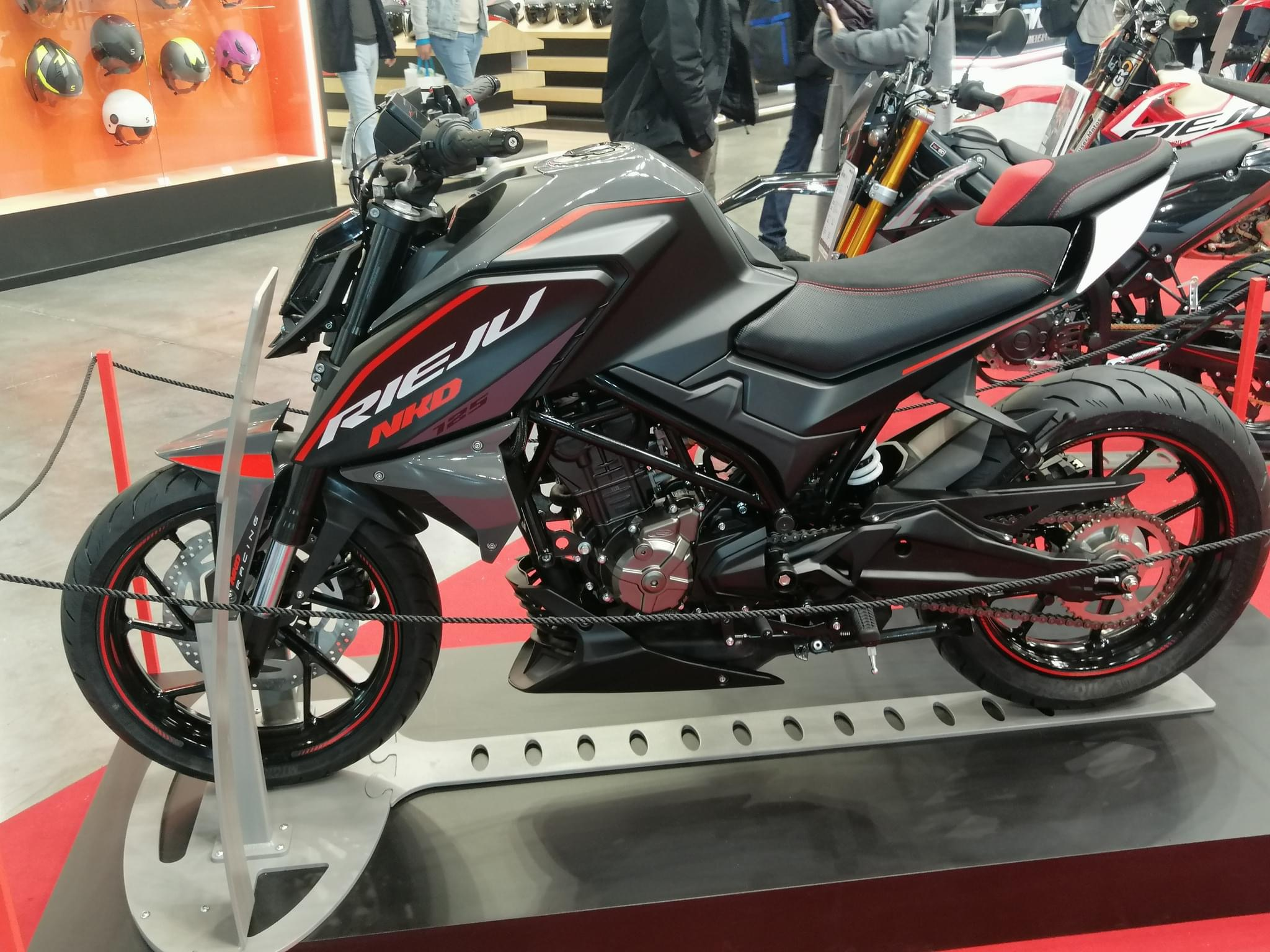
NKD 125

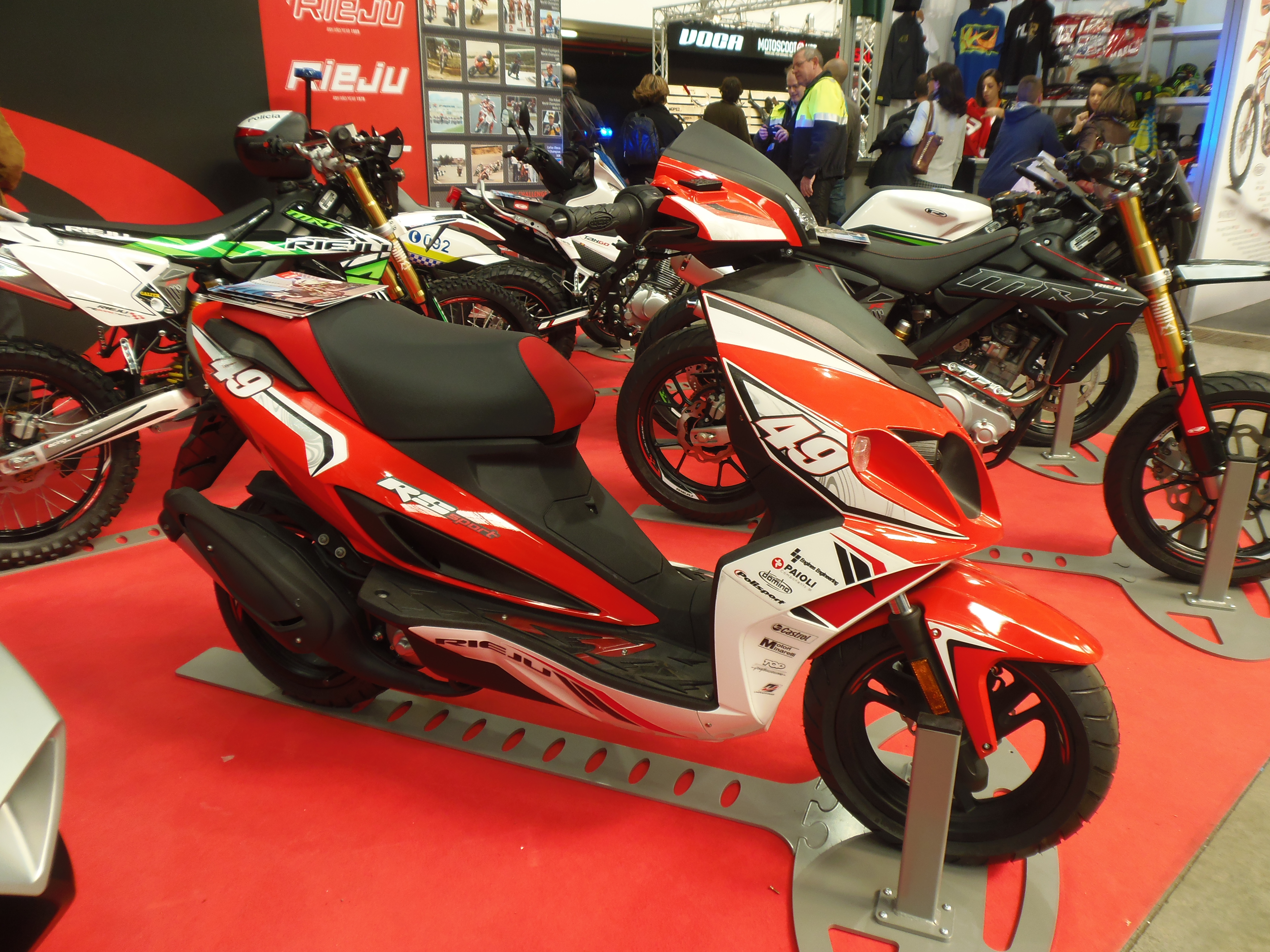
RS 50

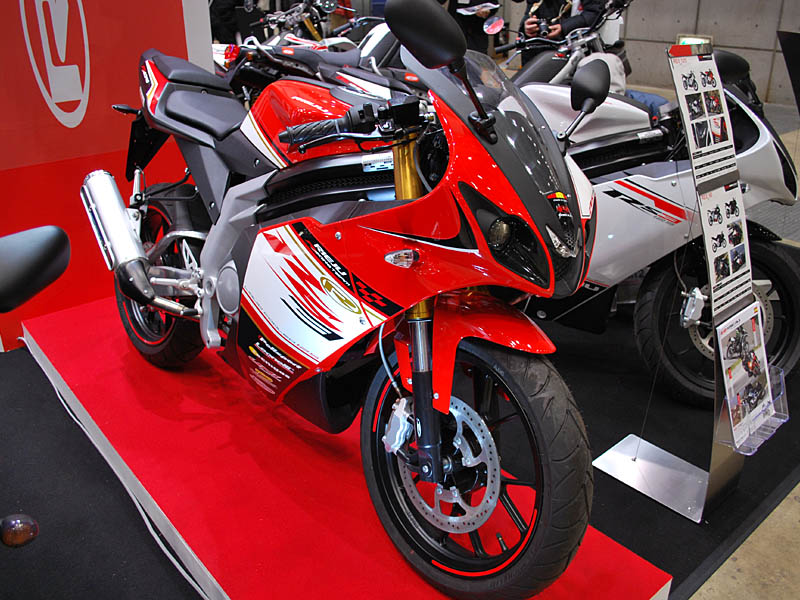
RS3 125

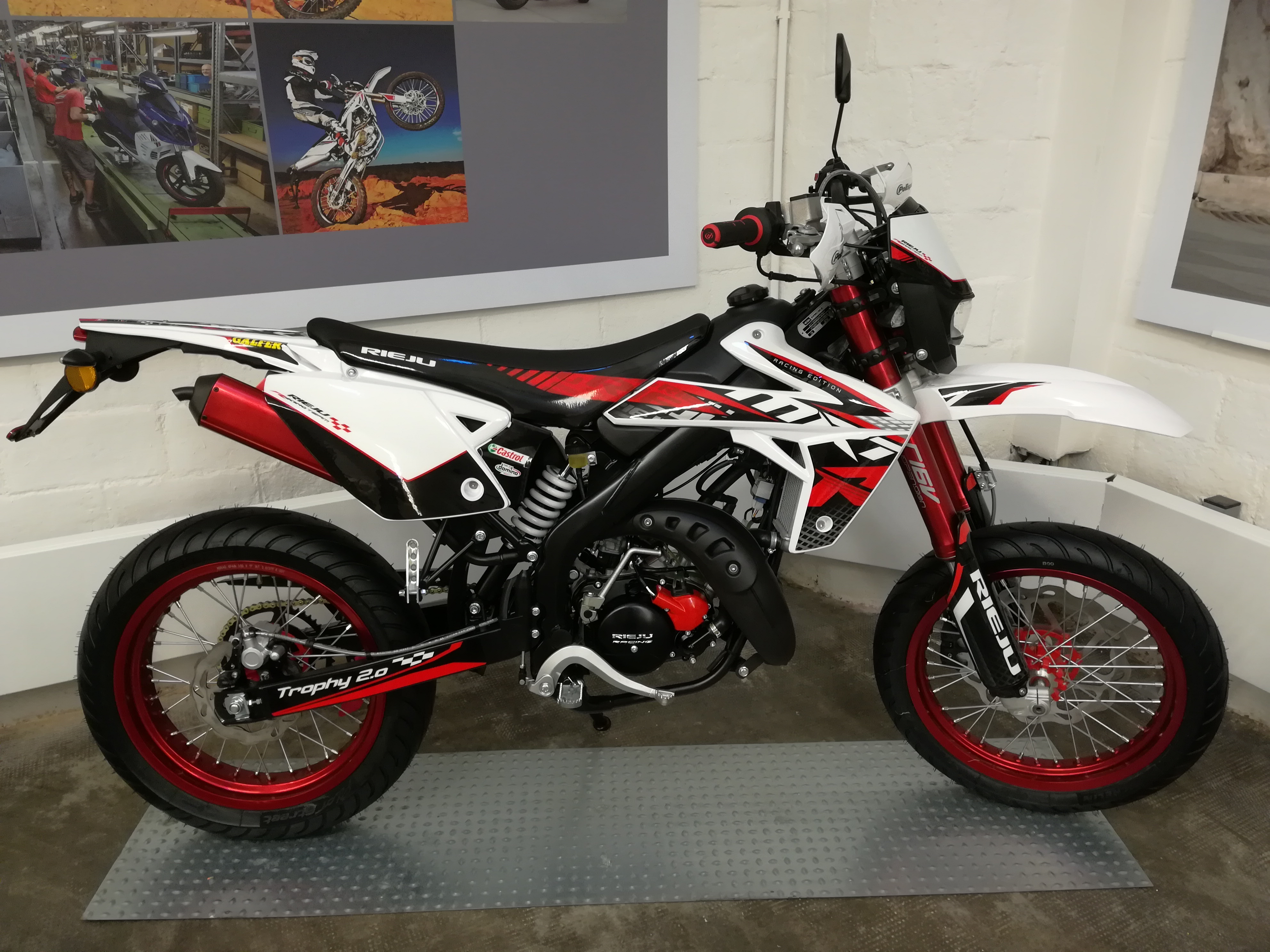
2016 MRT 50 SM

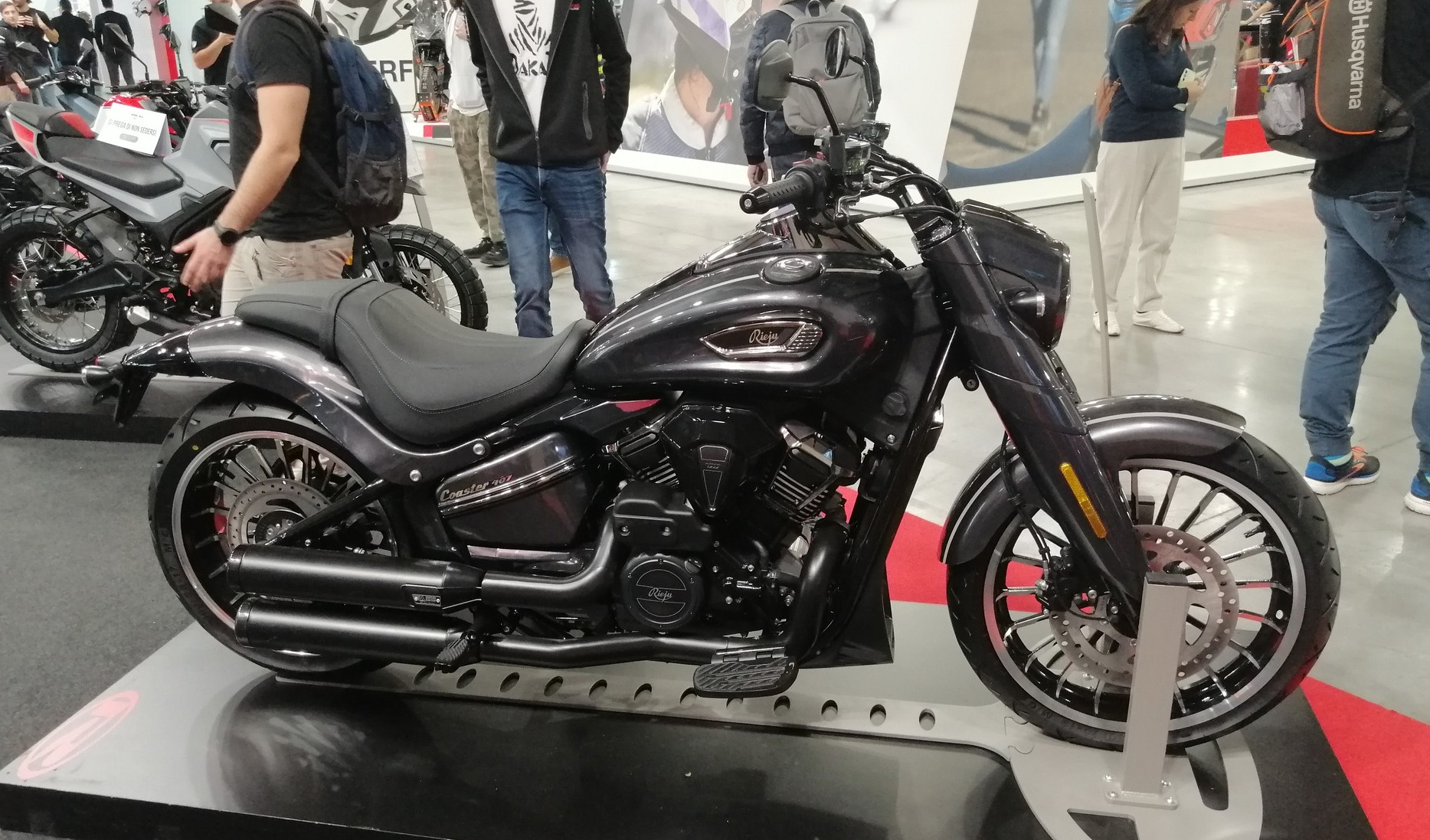
Coaster 407

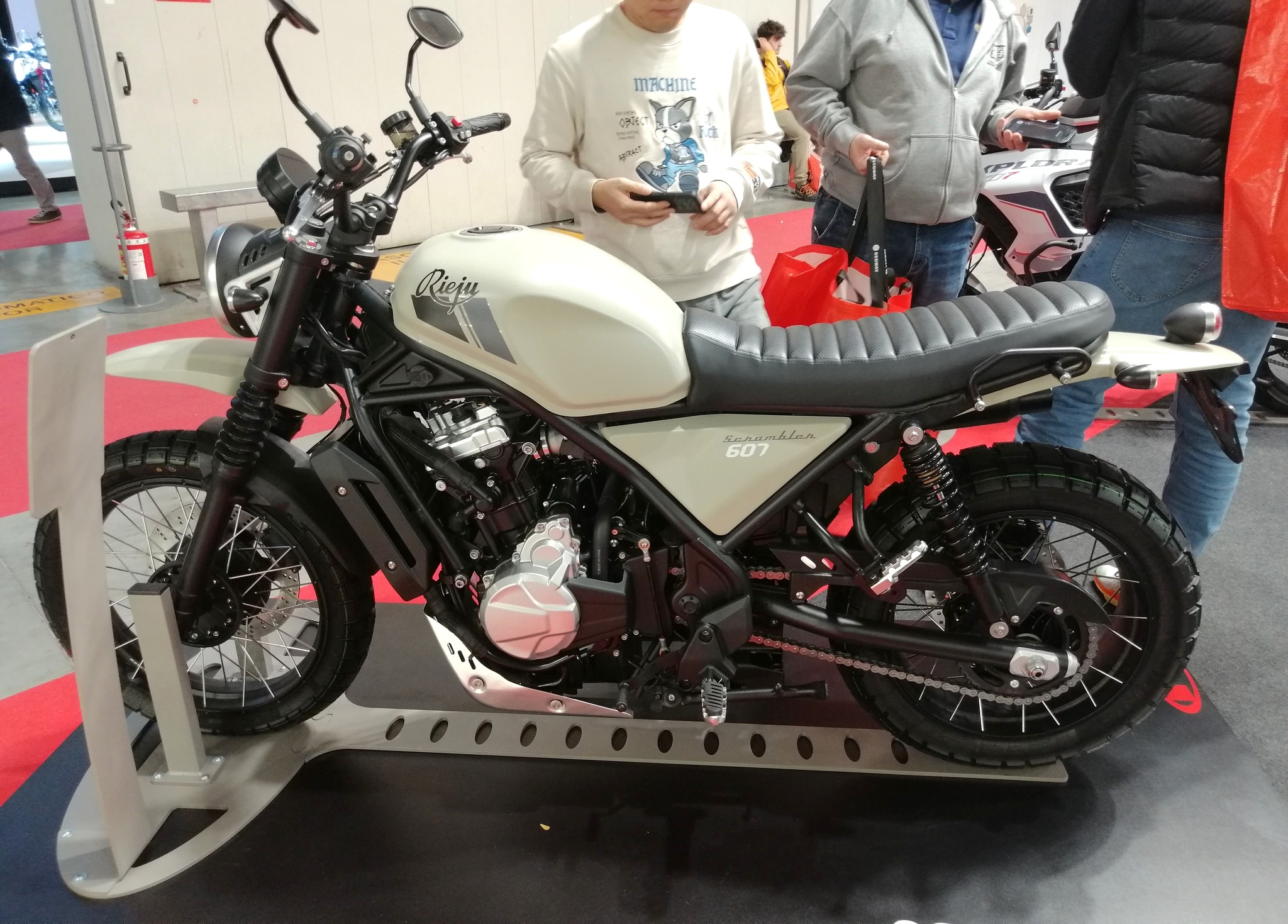
Scrambler 607
