= Regina Tavares da Silva =

Portuguese feminist and women's rights advocate

- Born: 1938? Vila de Rei, Portugal
- Other names: Maria Regina Neves Xavier Amorim Tavares da Silva
- Occupations: Teacher, government officer, international consultant
- Known for: Feminist and women’s rights advocate
- Notable work: A Mulher: Bibliografia Portuguesa Anotada (The Woman: Annotated Portuguese Bibliography)

Regina Tavares da Silva is a Portuguese politician, feminist, historical researcher and an international expert on women's rights. She has chaired several women's organizations, both Portuguese and international. She is arguably best known for her insistence that women's equality should not be treated as a social issue but as a requirement of both democracy and human rights.

== Early life and studies ==
Born in Vila de Rei in the centre of Portugal, Maria Regina Neves Xavier Amorim Tavares da Silva spent her first years in the city of Portalegre, then moving to Leiria when her father, a roads engineer, was transferred. In 1952, when she was almost 14 the family took up residence in the Portuguese capital of Lisbon. She first went to the D. Filipa de Lencastre High School. This school was opened just after the Estado Novo dictatorship had seized power in Portugal in 1926, with one of its policies being to end co-education in the country, and was the fourth girls-only High School in the country and the second in Lisbon. At the age of 15 she moved to a school with more of an Arts orientation, before going to the University of Lisbon, where she obtained a degree in German and English Literature, in 1960. By this time, she had already met Maria de Lourdes Pintasilgo who would later become, albeit briefly, the first female prime minister of Portugal. Pintasilgo introduced her to the Juventude Universitária Católica Feminina (Female Catholic University Youth -JUCF) and Tavares da Silva became involved in its work, being Secretary-General, Vice-President and President-General.

In 1962, she obtained a Fulbright scholarship and attended the religious Grailville College in Loveland, Ohio. 1963 was an important year for the Women's Movement in the US as it is when Betty Friedan's book The Feminine Mystique was published, which is often credited with sparking the second wave of American feminism in the 20th century. Also in that year, a Presidential Commission created by John F. Kennedy published a report on the situation of women, which showed that discrimination based on sex was widespread in American society.

Back in Lisbon, Tavares da Silva spent two years as a teacher, before going to the University of Cambridge in the United Kingdom between 1965 and 1967, obtaining a Diploma in English Studies with a thesis on A Portrait of the Artist as a Young Man by James Joyce. After this she was invited by Cambridge to pursue a PhD but chose to return to Portugal and get married. She, her three daughters and her husband moved to Coimbra in 1972 where he was appointed Professor of Chemical Engineering, and stayed there until 1975.

== Involvement in Government Commissions on Women ==
At the invitation of Lourdes Pintasilgo she worked at the Commission for Social Policy on Women, which had been created in September 1973, commuting between Coimbra and Lisbon. After the Carnation Revolution in April 1974 that overthrew the Estado Novo, the family returned to Lisbon in 1975 and Tavares da Silva continued to work at the commission, then renamed the Commission of the Female Condition (CCF). That year had been declared by the United Nations as the International Women's Year and Pintasilgo appointed Tavares da Silva to be in charge of its preparation in Portugal. The first World Conference on Women was held in June 1975 in Mexico City on the theme of "Equality, Development and Peace" and Tavares da Silva represented Portugal together with four others including Maria Alzira Lemos. Standing in for Pintasilgo, who was unable to attend at the last minute, and with little experience of public speaking, Tavares da Silva delivered Portugal's address to the Plenary of 3000 people. She would also participate in the Second World Conference on Women in Copenhagen in 1980.

== Women's Documentation Centre and research ==
Participation in the Mexico City conference also gave Tavares da Silva the opportunity to build up a collection of publications that she would use to establish the CCF Documentation Centre on women and equality. She took courses in Documentation science in Lisbon and at the University of Edinburgh, and visited several documentation centres to learn techniques. She also carried out a search in Portugal for old books and documents, which continue to provide an important research source. In addition, she embarked on a project to record memories of women involved in the women's movement at the beginning of the 20th Century. These were published in the CCF Bulletin and as a book.

In 1983, the CCF held a Seminar on Studies on Women, at the Gulbenkian Foundation in Lisbon. Tavares da Silva organized an Exhibition of Portuguese Books on Women. The XVII European Exhibition of Art, Science and Culture of the Council of Europe was held in Lisbon in 1983. Noting the absence of reference to women in the various exhibits, she researched female participation in the Portuguese Discoveries in the 15th and 16th centuries. This led to the publication of four articles that were eventually combined as one publication. A decade later, in November 1994, more than 600 researchers would visit Lisbon to participate in a conference entitled “The Female Face of Portuguese Expansion”.

== Council of Europe ==
From 1984, Tavares da Silva represented Portugal on the Council of Europe Committee on the Female Condition (CEEG), later to become the Chair of the Steering Committee for Equality between Women and Men (CDEG). She was Chair of the CEEG in 1987-88 and the CDEG in 1992–93. One of her proposals in these roles was that women's equality should be a component of the Council of Europe's human rights activities, rather than of its social activities. This approach was adopted by the World Conference on Human Rights, held in Vienna in 1993, in which she participated. In 1986, she was asked to become President of CCF, a position she held until 1992. From the outset of her new responsibility she proposed changing the name of the CCF from "Commission on the Condition of Women" to "Commission for the Equality and Rights of Women". It took until May 1991 for her to achieve this. In 1991 she was a founding member of the Portuguese Women's Studies Association (APEM) and in 1993 she was a founding member of the Portuguese Alliance for Parity Democracy (ADP).

== Work in other countries ==
In July 1980, Portugal had ratified the convention on the "Elimination of All Forms of Discrimination against Women" (CEDAW). As president of the CCF, Tavares da Silva was responsible for preparing and presenting Portugal's compliance report. On the strength of this she was asked by the UN's Division for the Advancement of Women (DAW), to work with countries that needed advice on preparing their report and she made several visits to Eastern and Central European countries between 1994 and 1998 for this purpose. This collaboration would lead to her election to the UN Committee on the Elimination of Discrimination against Women in 2000, where she served until 2008.

Until 2008, she continued to undertake missions for CEDAW, including to Malaysia, Haiti, South Korea, and Timor-Leste. Within the scope of the European Union, she also participated in 2011–2012 in the Experts' Forum of the European Institute for Gender Equality (EIGE). She was included in the calendar produced by EIGE under the "Women Inspiring Europe" project in 2012.

== Other activities ==
In 1995, the IV World Conference on Women was held in Beijing. Tavares da Silva did not attend but played an important role in preparatory discussions. A member of the Southern European Women's Association (AFEM), she was elected Secretary-General in 1997, serving for two years. In 1999, she produced the first Portuguese bibliography of papers on women, with the title A Mulher: Bibliografia Portuguesa Anotada, (The Woman: Annotated Portuguese Bibliography). In 2000, during the Portuguese presidency of the European Union, she was asked by the Ministry of Foreign Affairs to coordinate participation in the Commission on the Status of Women (CSW) and in the preparatory process for the Special Session of the United Nations General Assembly, to evaluate progress in the five years since the IV World Conference on Women.

in 2003 Tavares da Silva was tasked, with a Cuban colleague on CEDAW, to carry out an investigation following a complaint lodged with CEDAW on the situation in Ciudad Juárez, Mexico, involving the abduction, murder and disappearance of around 400 women and girls, without any action being taken. After the investigation, carried out on the spot, she presented the findings to the UN in January 2005. She considered this experience, together with an investigation into the rape of Muslim women in Bosnia and Herzegovina that she had carried out in 1993, to be the most disturbing of her life.

== Awards ==
- On June 10, 1995, Tavares da Silva was awarded the Order of Merit by the President of the Portuguese Republic.
- The Commission for Constitutional Affairs, Rights, Freedoms and Guarantees of the Assembly of the Republic, within the scope of the “Human Rights Award 2014”, awarded Tavares da Silva one of two gold medals commemorating the 50th anniversary of the Universal Declaration of Human Rights.

== Publications ==
- Carolina Beatriz Ângelo (1877-1911) (2nd ed). Lisbon: Commission for Citizenship and Gender Equality, 2013. ISBN 978-972-597-358-5
- A Mulher: Bibliografia Portuguesa Anotada (Monographs, 1518–1998), Lisbon, Edições Cosmos, 1999.
- Heroínas da Expansão e Descobrimentos. Lisboa. CCF, 1989. (Cadernos da Condição Feminina, 31).
- Feminismo em Portugal na voz das mulheres escritoras do início do século XX, Lisboa, Comissão da Condição Feminina.
- Mulheres portuguesas, vidas e obras celebradas, vidas e obras ignoradas, Lisboa, CIDM, Ditos & Escritos.
- Democracia Paritária - um conceito novo ou um novo olhar sobre a Democracia, Lisboa, CIDM.
- Estudos sobre as Mulheres em Portugal, um olhar sobre o passado, in Ex- Aequo, nº1, pp. 17–28.
