= Maria Alzira Lemos =

Portuguese feminist and parliamentary deputy

- Born: 1919; Lisbon, Portugal
- Died: 2005 (aged 85–86); Lisbon
- Other name: Maria Alzira Costa de Castro Cardoso Lemos
- Occupation: Lawyer
- Known for: Feminist and socialist member of Portuguese Representative Assembly

Maria Alzira Lemos (1919–2005), also known as Maria Alzira Costa de Castro Cardoso Lemos, was a Portuguese parliamentary deputy, socialist, feminist and women's rights activist, who assisted with the creation of the Portuguese Platform for the Rights of Women.

== Early life and family ==
Maria Alzira Costa de Castro Cardoso Lemos was born in 1919 in the Portuguese capital of Lisbon. Her father, Fernando de Castro, came from Porto. Her mother, Maria Emília, was from Coimbra, and was the daughter of Afonso Costa, a lawyer, professor and politician, who had campaigned for Portugal to become a Republic and was one of the first Republican deputies during the monarchy and, subsequently, a government minister on several occasions. At the time of her birth in 1919, her grandfather was leading the Portuguese delegation at the Versailles Peace Conference. After the authoritarian Estado Novo dictatorship, which governed Portugal from 1926, came to power Costa was banned from entering Portugal and lived in exile in Paris. Lemos wrote that she had spent all her childhood and adolescence in expectation and in hope for a revolution that would allow not only the return of freedom to Portugal but also allow her family to get together. Her paternal grandfather, Elísio de Castro, was also a Republican, who played an active role with those who tried to overthrow the Estado Novo.

Lemos learned to speak French at home and was reading and writing French before Portuguese. She then attended the German school in Lisbon, but was withdrawn when Hitler came to power and Nazi propaganda was introduced at the school. She then went to the Colégio Valsassina before studying at home. After working at a bank in Lisbon and as an intern on a children's newspaper in Paris, she entered law school. The realisation while at law school, where female students were outnumbered by more than six to one, that women had a lower status and education than men, not only at work but even in the family, where the head of household made all the decisions and had to approve before his wife could work, was when she began to develop feminist ideas.

== Socialist Party ==
After graduation Lemos worked in her father's law office. Following the Carnation Revolution, which overthrew the Estado Novo in 1974, she joined the Socialist Party. Members of a delegation from the Women's Section of the Socialist International urged Socialist Party members to work to defend the equality of women's rights. With Madalena Barbosa, Lemos was part of a small group that collaborated to prepare the section on "Women and the Family" in the Policy Programme presented to the party's First Congress, in which the right to divorce, equality of rights for women and men and equal rights for children born outside marriage were all proposed. Also in 1974 and 1975, several women's organizations collaborated to review legal discrimination against women, with Lemos representing the Socialist Party.

== Election to the Representative Assembly ==
In 1975 the United Nations International Women's Year was celebrated. The first World Conference on Women was held in June 1975 in Mexico City on the theme of "Equality, Development and Peace". Lemos participated in this three-week conference, representing Portugal, together with five others, and would also participate in the Second Conference in Copenhagen in 1980. In 1975 she was elected to the Constitutional Assembly and in the 1976 elections was elected to the newly created Representative Assembly, when the Socialist Party, led by Mario Soares was victorious. At this time, only 5% of the deputies were women. After the election the government formed a Commission on the Condition of Women (CCF), with an Advisory Council made up of NGOs and government departments. After losing her seat in the 1979 elections, Lemos became a member of the Advisory Council to the commission, representing the Socialist Party's women's organization, which she had helped found. In 1980 she became a member of Commission, under the presidency of Regina Tavares da Silva and stayed on it until she was 72. She was also providing legal assistance to women, which exposed her for the first time to the level of domestic violence in all social classes.

== Later years ==
As a lawyer, Lemos was the first woman to be invited to give a presentation at the Portuguese Bar Association. When she retired she became part of the Advisory Council of the Women's Health Commission, which later became the Commission for Equality and Women's Rights, representing the Associação Intervenção Feminina, of which she had been a founding member in 1985. She was a founding member of the Alliance for Parity Democracy in 1995, which eventually led, in 2006, to Portugal implementing a quota system whereby at least 33% of members of the Assembly have to be women. She also joined the Associação Portuguesa de Estudos sobre as Mulheres (Portuguese Association for the Study of Women - APEM). In the last two years of her life, she supported the establishment of the Plataforma Portuguesa para os Direitos das Mulheres (Portuguese Platform for the Rights of Women), whose headquarters is named the Centro Maria Alzira Lemos.

Lemos died in October 2005. She had two children. She had been attending meetings until three days before her death. The Portuguese Parliament unanimously approved on 13 October 2005 a vote of condolence for her death. She had been made a Commander of the Order of Merit in May 1997.
