= Picoto da Melriça =

Monument at the geodesic centre of Portugal

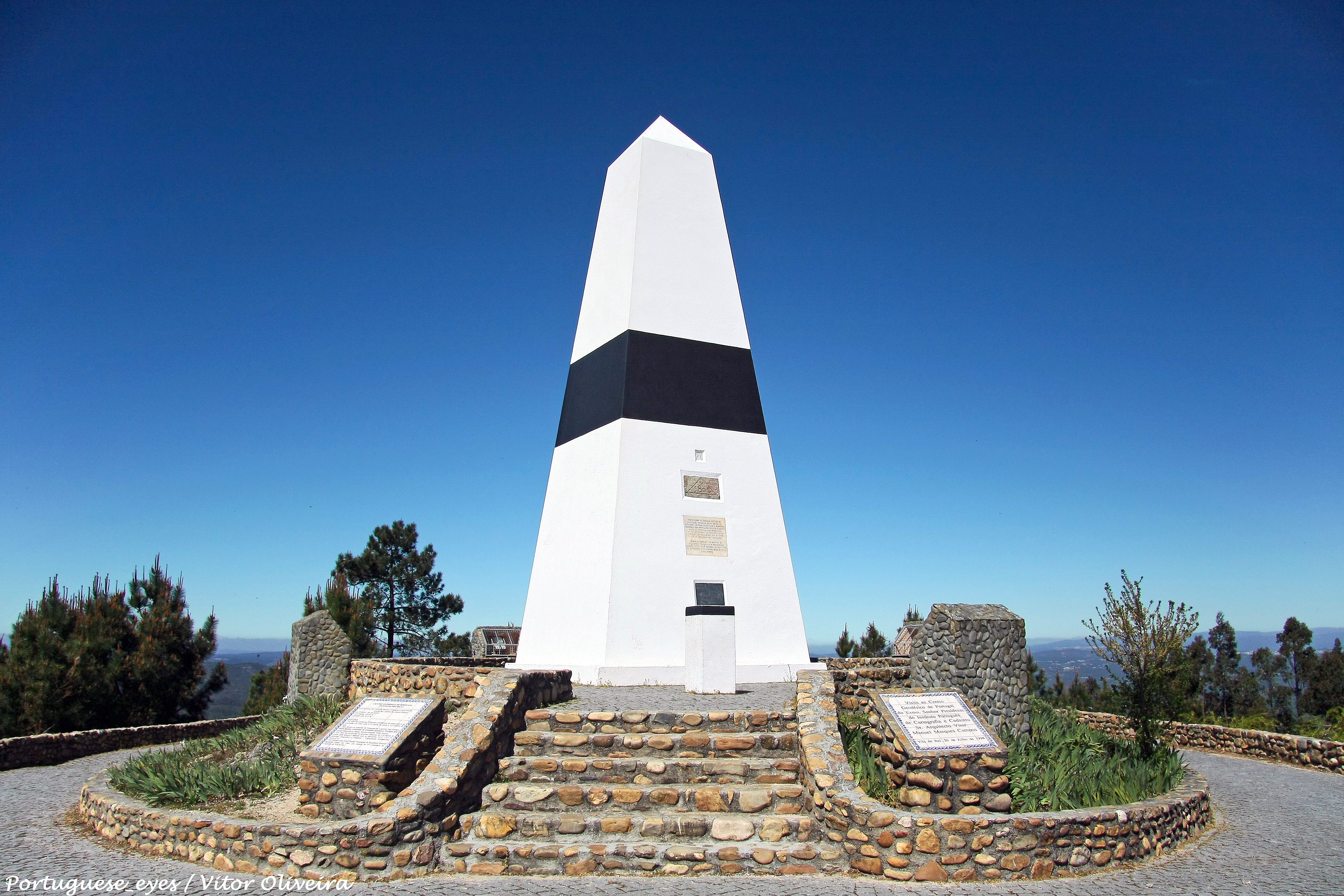
- The monument
- Coordinates: 39°41′40″N 8°07′50″W
- Width: 3 m^{2} (32 sq ft)
- Height: 9 m (30 ft)
- Beginning date: 1802

Picoto da Melriça is a monument and the geodesic centre of mainland Portugal. Constructed in 1802, the triangulation station sits on top of the Serra da Melriça, a 592 m (1,942 ft) high mountain range in the municipality of Vila de Rei, offering a 360° view of its surroundings. Despite being the geodesic centre, it is not the geometric centre of mainland Portugal, which is located in the neighboring Mação.

Predating the construction of the monument, Francisco António Ciera, a mathematician and cartographer was commanded by Maria I of Portugal to create a triangulation of the Kingdom of Portugal, a job he delegated from 1788 to 1803. The construction of the station took place in 1802.

A museum (Museu da Geodesia) was created in 2002 next to the monument.
