= Vila de Rei =

- Municipality
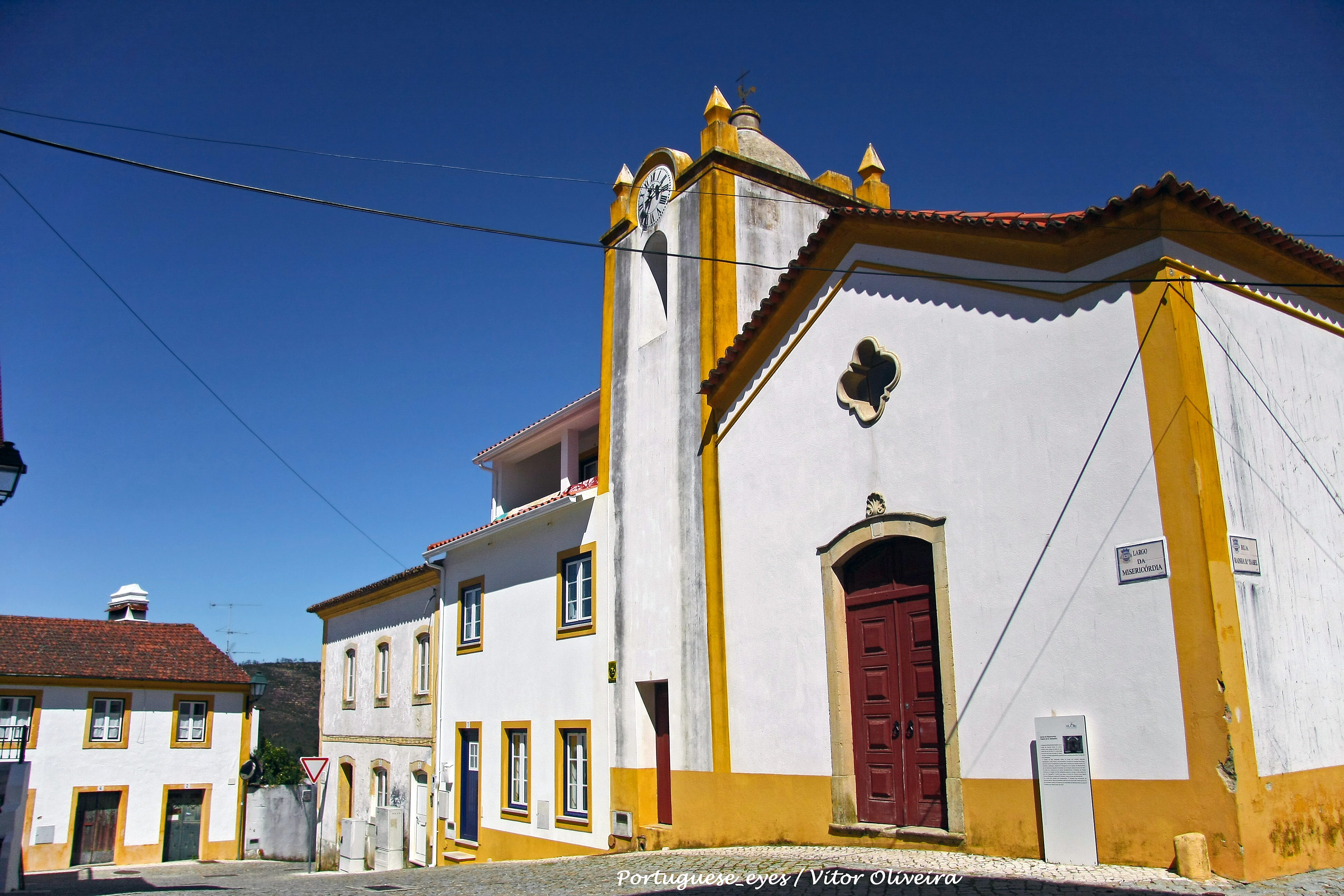
- Misericórdia Church in Vila de Rei

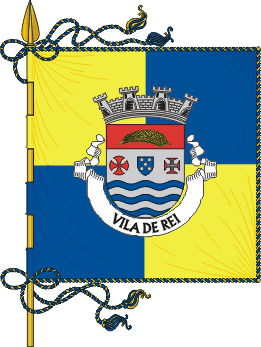
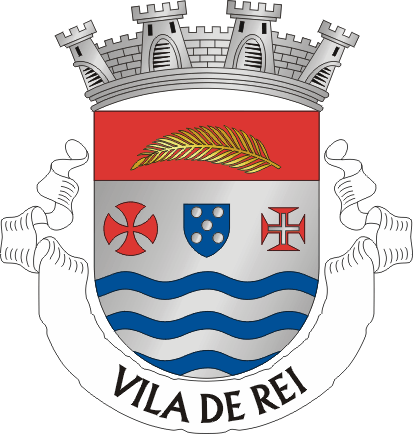
- Flag Coat of arms
- Interactive map of Vila de Rei
- Coordinates: 39°40′N 8°08′W
- Country: Portugal
- Region: Oeste e Vale do Tejo
- Intermunic. comm.: Médio Tejo
- District: Castelo Branco
- Parishes: 3

Government
  - President: Ricardo Jorge Martins Aires (PSD)

Area
  - Total: 191.55 km^{2} (73.96 sq mi)

Population (2011)
  - Total: 3,452
  - Density: 18.02/km^{2} (46.68/sq mi)
- Time zone: UTC+00:00 (WET)
  - Summer (DST): UTC+01:00 (WEST)
- Local holiday: September 19
- Website: www.cm-viladerei.pt

Vila de Rei (European Portuguese pronunciation: [ˈvilɐ ðɨ ˈʁɐj]; "King Town") is a municipality in the district of Castelo Branco in Portugal. The population in 2011 was 3,452, in an area of 191.55 km^{2}.

A small municipality covered with pinewoods, located precisely at the centre of Portugal, as marked by the Picoto da Melriça, a monument indicating the geodesic centre of Mainland Portugal. In addition, the site offers a spectacular panoramic view over a vast territory and includes a small Geodesy Museum.

The present mayor is Ricardo Jorge Martins Aires, elected by the Social Democratic Party. The municipal holiday is September 19.

== Monuments and landmarks ==
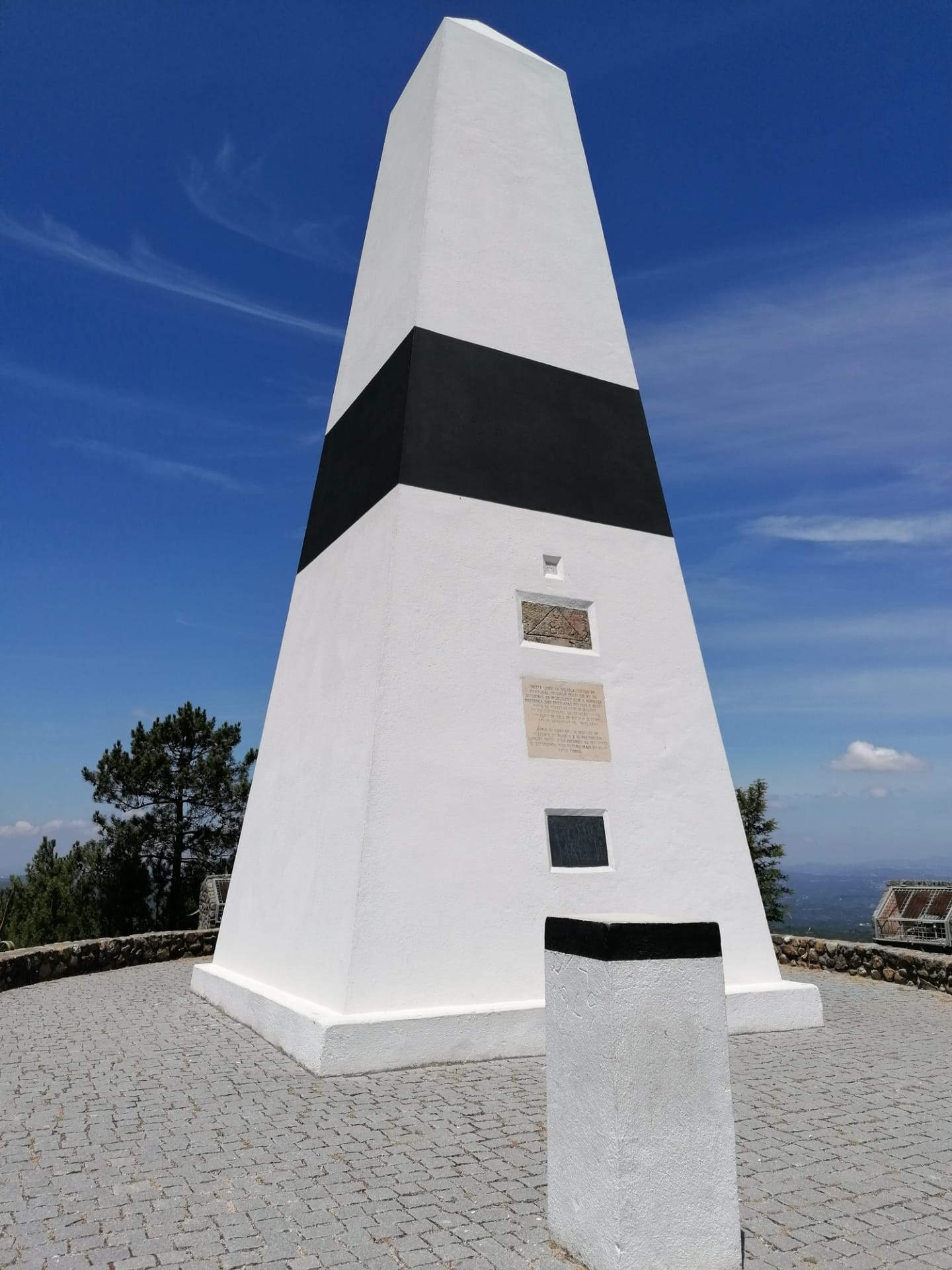
Geodesic Center of Portugal

At the small town of Vila de Rei, it is worth admiring the 18th century Parish Church and the Miserichord Chapel. A natural curiosity of Vila de Rei is the Penedo Furado (pierced boulder), which has been adapted to shelter two belvederes, set on a rocky platform surrounded by woods and small water-falls. The Saint Michael Castro, on the top of the Ladeira mountains, at an altitude of about 493 metres (1,600 ft), is a fortified and walled settlement considered to be of Celtic origin and dates from the Iron Age, having been classified as a National Monument. Vila de Rei is also on the route of shale villages having one of the most beautiful examples is the Água Formosa.

The Geodesic Center of Portugal is also located on this municipality, at the Melriça ridge.

== Gastronomy ==
Typical gastronomy in the region includes dishes such as fish soup, roast kid or bucho recheado (stuffed pig's stomach), besides typical honey cakes and rice pudding.

== Parishes ==
Administratively, the municipality is divided into 3 civil parishes (freguesias):

- Fundada (638 inhabitants - 2011 Census)
- São João do Peso (204 inhabitants - 2011 Census)
- Vila de Rei (2,610 inhabitants - 2011 Census)

== Notable people ==
- Regina Tavares da Silva (born ca.1938 in Vila de Rei) a Portuguese politician, feminist, historical researcher and an international expert on women's rights.
