= Opinion polling for the 2026 Brazilian presidential election =

Since the 2022 Brazilian general election, polling companies have published surveys tracking national voting intention for the 2026 presidential election. The results of these surveys are listed below in reverse chronological order, and include candidates who frequently polled above 3% and are registered in a party, as well as eligible by the Superior Electoral Court of Brazil. They also include candidates from parties that passed the electoral threshold (Note: The electoral threshold in 2022 required each party to obtain at least 2% of the valid votes for the Chamber of Deputies nationwide, with a minimum of 1% in one-third of the states (nine states), or to elect at least 11 federal deputies distributed across nine states.) in 2022, and therefore have access to public campaign funding, free radio and television advertising time, and the right to participate in debates.

== First round ==
=== Graphical summary ===
Aggregate data of voting intention from opinion polling for the presidential election. Each line represents a local regression. Only prospective candidates and individuals who frequently appear in polls are included. The "Undecided", "Blank/Null" and "Absent" groups were calculated out.

=== Polling aggregation ===
| Aggregator | Last update | | | | | | | Others | Blank Null Undec. | Margin of error | Lead | Link |
| Aggregator | Last update | Lula PT | F. Bolsonaro PL | Caiado PSD | Zema Novo | Santos Mission | Cury Avante | Others | Blank Null Undec. | Margin of error | Lead | Link |
|---|---|---|---|---|---|---|---|---|---|---|---|---|
| UOL | 4 October 2026 | 40.6 | 37.3 | 3.6 | —N/a | 3.4 | 4.9 | —N/a | —N/a | —N/a | 3.3 | |
| BBC/PollingData | 4 October 2026 | 41.8 | 40.1 | 3.1 | 0.6 | 2.9 | 3.3 | 1.7 | 8.9 | ±3 pp | 1.7 | |
| Poll+Trend (Final) | 4 October 2026 | 45.45 | 44.51 | 2.31 | 0.66 | 3.35 | 3.16 | 0.56 | —N/a | —N/a | 0.96 | |
| Plano Político | 3 October 2026 | 44.4 | 42.8 | 3.5 | 1.1 | 3.6 | 4.1 | —N/a | —N/a | ±2.5 pp | 1.6 | |
| ABC Dados | 3 October 2026 | 46.4 | 42.8 | 2.8 | 0.8 | 3.6 | 3.3 | —N/a | —N/a | —N/a | 3.6 | |
| The Economist | 3 October 2026 | 40 | 37 | 3 | 1 | 4 | 5 | —N/a | 10 | —N/a | 3 | |

=== 2026 ===
==== Aug–Oct (Campaign period) ====
| Pollster | Polling period | | | | | | | Others (Note: So far, the candidates who have neither reached at least 3% in recent polls nor are affiliated with parties that passed the electoral threshold in 2022 are as follows: Clariana Barão (DC); Edmilson Costa (PCB); Hertz Dias (PSTU); Pablo Marçal (PRTB) (ineligible); Rui Costa Pimenta (PCO); Samara Martins (UP); Wilson Grassi (Democrat)) | Blank Null Undec. | Margin of error | Sample size | Lead | Link |
| Pollster | Polling period | Lula PT | F. Bolsonaro PL | Caiado PSD | Zema Novo | Santos Mission | Cury Avante | Others | Blank Null Undec. | Margin of error | Sample size | Lead | Link |
|---|---|---|---|---|---|---|---|---|---|---|---|---|---|
| Results | 4 Oct | 45.16 | 47.03 | 2.18 | 0.27 | 2.24 | 2.89 | 0.23 | —N/a | —N/a | Valid votes | 1.87 | |
| Results | 4 Oct | 43.00 | 44.78 | 2.07 | 0.25 | 2.13 | 2.75 | 0.22 | 4.77 | —N/a | Total votes | 1.78 | |
| Datafolha | 3 Oct | 42 | 40 | 4 | 0 | 3 | 3 | 0 | 7 | ±2 pp | 4,006 | 2 | |
| Quaest | 2–3 Oct | 40 | 38 | 3 | 0 | 3 | 3 | 0 | 13 | ±2 pp | 3,702 | 2 | |
| Futura | 2–3 Oct | 40.5 | 42.5 | 3.7 | 0.8 | 2.6 | 3.9 | 1 | 2.6 | ±2.2 pp | 2,000 | 2 | |
| Palver | 30 Sep–3 Oct | 43 | 47 | 1 | 0 | 7 | 1 | 0 | 0 | ±2.4 pp | 5,000 | 4 | |
| PoderData | 30 Sep–2 Oct | 42 | 41 | 2 | 1 | 3 | 3 | 1 | 6 | ±1.5 pp | 4,000 | 1 | |
| MDA | 29 Sep–2 Oct | 43.1 | 38 | 3 | 0.8 | 1.5 | 3.2 | 0.5 | 9.7 | ±2.2 pp | 2,007 | 5.1 | |
| AtlasIntel | 27 Sep–2 Oct | 46.7 | 43.8 | 1.4 | 0.3 | 4.6 | 2.1 | 0.6 | 0.6 | ±1 pp | 4,945 | 2.9 | |
| | 1 Oct | Last day of free electoral broadcast time on TV and Radio. | | | | | | | | | | | |
| Vox Brasil | 29 Sep–1 Oct | 40.4 | 41.2 | 3.3 | 1.3 | 2.2 | 1.2 | 0.2 | 10.2 | ±2.15 pp | 2,100 | 0.8 | |
| Datafolha | 28–30 Sep | 42 | 38 | 3 | 1 | 3 | 4 | 2 | 7 | ±2 pp | 2,506 | 4 | |
| Real Time | 26–30 Sep | 43 | 39 | 3 | 1 | 4 | 3 | 1 | 6 | ±2 pp | 2,000 | 4 | |
| Indexa | 27–29 Sep | 39 | 34 | 4 | 1 | 3 | 4 | 0 | 11 | ±2.2 pp | 2,000 | 5 | |
| Futura | 25–29 Sep | 39.4 | 42.2 | 4 | 1.6 | 3.2 | 3.8 | 0.8 | 5 | ±2.2 pp | 2,000 | 2.8 | |
| Vox Brasil | 26–28 Sep | 41.4 | 37.8 | 3.8 | 1.8 | 2.7 | 2.2 | 0.3 | 10.3 | ±2.15 pp | 2,100 | 3.6 | |
| Ideia | 25–28 Sep | 39.4 | 38.4 | 4.4 | 3.5 | 4.5 | 6.7 | 1.4 | 2.2 | ±2.2 pp | 2,000 | 1 | |
| AtlasIntel | 23–28 Sep | 45.3 | 42.2 | 1.8 | 0.9 | 5.2 | 2.0 | 0.5 | 2.1 | ±1 pp | 5,005 | 3.1 | |
| Nexus | 25–27 Sep | 42 | 37 | 5 | 1 | 4 | 5 | 1 | 5 | ±2 pp | 2,000 | 5 | |
| Quaest | 24–27 Sep | 39 | 34 | 4 | 1 | 3 | 4 | 0 | 15 | ±2 pp | 2,004 | 5 | |
| Palver | 24–27 Sep | 44 | 44 | 1 | 1 | 8 | 1 | 0 | 2 | ±2.4 pp | 5,000 | Tie | |
| Datafolha | 22–24 Sep | 40 | 36 | 4 | 1 | 3 | 5 | 1 | 7 | ±2 pp | 2,002 | 4 | |
| Futura | 18–24 Sep | 38.4 | 40.4 | 5.7 | 0.9 | 2.4 | 5.6 | 1.2 | 5.3 | ±2.4 pp | 2,000 | 2 | |
| PoderData | 20–23 Sep | 41 | 39 | 2 | 1 | 3 | 6 | 3 | 6 | ±1.8 pp | 3,000 | 2 | |
| Palver | 20–23 Sep | 43 | 43 | 1 | 1 | 8 | 2 | 1 | 2 | ±3 pp | 5,000 | Tie | |
| Real Time | 19–23 Sep | 41 | 37 | 2 | 1 | 6 | 6 | 1 | 6 | ±2 pp | 2,000 | 4 | |
| AtlasIntel | 17–22 Sep | 45.8 | 43.4 | 1.3 | 0.9 | 4.5 | 2.1 | 0.8 | 1.2 | ±1 pp | 5,015 | 2.4 | |
| Nexus | 18–20 Sep | 40 | 37 | 5 | 1 | 3 | 6 | 1 | 6 | ±2 pp | 2,006 | 3 | |
| Quaest | 17–20 Sep | 37 | 33 | 4 | 1 | 3 | 6 | 1 | 15 | ±2 pp | 2,004 | 4 | |
| Palver | 15–20 Sep | 41 | 42 | 1 | 1 | 11 | 2 | 1 | 1 | ±3 pp | 5,000 | 1 | |
| Datafolha | 15–16 Sep | 39 | 36 | 4 | 2 | 3 | 6 | 2 | 9 | ±2 pp | 2,002 | 3 | |
| PoderData | 13–16 Sep | 37 | 36 | 3 | 1 | 3 | 8 | 6 | 6 | ±1.8 pp | 3,000 | 1 | |
| AtlasIntel | 11–16 Sep | 44.1 | 41.7 | 1.7 | 1.1 | 5.1 | 3.5 | 0.7 | 2.1 | ±1 pp | 5,018 | 2.4 | |
| Futura | 11–15 Sep | 38.3 | 37.7 | 4.5 | 1 | 3.4 | 6.5 | 2.4 | 6.1 | ±2.2 pp | 2,000 | 0.6 | |
| Nexus | 11–13 Sep | 42 | 37 | 5 | 1 | 2 | 6 | 1 | 6 | ±2 pp | 2,003 | 5 | |
| Quaest | 10–13 Sep | 36 | 31 | 4 | 1 | 4 | 7 | 0 | 17 | ±2 pp | 2,004 | 5 | |
| Indexa | 10–13 Sep | 38 | 34 | 4 | 1 | 3 | 6 | 0 | 14 | ±2.2 pp | 2,000 | 4 | |
| MDA | 9–13 Sep | 40.5 | 30.4 | 3 | 1 | 2.7 | 6 | 2.9 | 13.5 | ±2.2 pp | 2,002 | 10.1 | |
| Datafolha | 8–10 Sep | 39 | 35 | 4 | 2 | 3 | 6 | 4 | 10 | ±2 pp | 2,002 | 4 | |
| Futura | 4–10 Sep | 39.2 | 33.6 | 4.4 | 0.7 | 4.3 | 6.4 | 3 | 8.3 | ±2.2 pp | 2,000 | 5.6 | |
| PoderData | 6–9 Sep | 38 | 36 | 2 | 1 | 3 | 10 | 5 | 4 | ±1.8 pp | 3,000 | 2 | |
| AtlasIntel | 4–9 Sep | 43 | 37.4 | 1.1 | 2.1 | 6.5 | 6.6 | 2.3 | 1 | ±1 pp | 5,000 | 5.6 | |
| Palver | 4–7 Sep | 40 | 39 | 1 | 1 | 11 | 4 | 1 | 2 | ±3 pp | 5,000 | 1 | |
| Ideia | 4–7 Sep | 38.4 | 37.3 | 4 | 1.5 | 4 | 6.6 | 3.1 | 5.3 | ±2.5 pp | 1,500 | 1.1 | |
| Nexus | 4–7 Sep | 39 | 35 | 4 | 1 | 4 | 9 | 2 | 5 | ±2 pp | 2,002 | 4 | |
| Quaest | 3–6 Sep | 36 | 29 | 3 | 2 | 3 | 8 | 1 | 18 | ±2 pp | 2,004 | 7 | |
| Datafolha | 1–2 Sep | 38 | 33 | 4 | 2 | 3 | 8 | 3 | 9 | ±2 pp | 2,002 | 5 | |
| PoderData | 30 Aug – 2 Sep | 37 | 34 | 2 | 1 | 3 | 10 | 8 | 7 | ±1.8 pp | 3,000 | 3 | |
| | 1 Sep | Beginning of the institutional crisis at the Supreme Federal Court. (Note: The STF crisis intensified on 1 September, with the revelation of messages exchanged between Justice Alexandre de Moraes and banker Daniel Vorcaro — including on the day of his arrest — whose confidentiality had been lifted by Justice André Mendonça. The messages revealed indications of improper closeness between the two, along with other revelations involving Prosecutor General Paulo Gonet. In response, on 3 September, Moraes requested that an investigation be opened against Mendonça as part of the Fake News Inquiry, for his handling of the Master case investigation. The situation escalated on 8 September, when Mendonça ordered the preventive removal of the Federal Police's Director-General, Andrei Rodrigues, alleging that he had been illegally monitored by the PF. The following day, 9 September, Justice Flávio Dino ordered the immediate reinstatement of Rodrigues, creating a standoff. Later that same day, the Court's president, Justice Edson Fachin, suspended both Mendonça's decision and Dino's, maintaining the status quo until a final ruling, and removed Moraes as rapporteur of the fake news inquiry, taking over the case himself. Fachin also called an extraordinary session for 15 September, at which the full court is expected to rule on the legality of Mendonça's actions, the validity of the evidence obtained from Vorcaro's phone, and the Prosecutor General's Office's request to annul the entire procedure.) | | | | | | | | | | | |
| Quaest | 30 Aug – 1 Sep | 37 | 29 | 1 | 1 | 3 | 10 | 1 | 18 | ±2 pp | 2,004 | 8 | |
| Futura | 27 Aug – 1 Sep | 38.7 | 33.6 | 3.5 | 1.6 | 2.8 | 9.9 | 3.8 | 6.1 | ±2.2 pp | 2,000 | 5.1 | |
| Real Time | 27–31 Aug | 38 | 30 | 4 | 2 | 7 | 11 | 2 | 6 | ±2 pp | 2,000 | 8 | |
| Nexus | 28–30 Aug | 39 | 33 | 5 | 1 | 3 | 11 | 1 | 6 | ±2 pp | 2,005 | 6 | |
| AtlasIntel | 25–30 Aug | 43.4 | 33.7 | 3.3 | 1.0 | 7.6 | 7.8 | 4.0 | 0.3 | ±1 pp | 5,014 | 9.7 | |
| | 28 Aug | Beginning of free electoral broadcast time on TV and Radio. (Note: Candidates from coalitions that include parties which passed the electoral threshold in 2022 are entitled to free advertisement on television and radio from 28 August to 1 October 2026. The block for presidential candidates occurs three days per week, twice per day, for 12min30s, of which 10% are divided equally among all candidates entitled to airtime, and 90% are distributed proportionally to the number of federal deputies of the parties in each candidate's coalition. The candidates entitled to free TV and radio airtime are as follows: Lula: 5min32s; F. Bolsonaro: 4min20s; Caiado: 2min02s; Cury: 36s) | | | | | | | | | | | |
| Vox Brasil | 25–27 Aug | 37.1 | 34.8 | 5 | 2.8 | 3.3 | 2.6 | 4.1 | 10.3 | ±2.15 pp | 2,100 | 2.3 | |
| PoderData | 23–26 Aug | 38 | 35 | 4 | 2 | 4 | 4 | 7 | 7 | ±2 pp | 2,400 | 3 | |
| | 23 Aug | First televised presidential debate. Lula, Flávio Bolsonaro, and Zema did not attend. | | | | | | | | | | | |
| Nexus | 21–23 Aug | 41 | 37 | 5 | 3 | 3 | 2 | 1 | 8 | ±2 pp | 2,006 | 4 | |
| Indexa | 20–23 Aug | 39 | 34 | 5 | 1 | 4 | 1 | 0 | 16 | ±2.2 pp | 2,000 | 5 | |
| Datafolha | 18–20 Aug | 39 | 33 | 5 | 3 | 4 | 2 | 4 | 10 | ±2 pp | 2,058 | 6 | |
| Nexus | 14–16 Aug | 41 | 36 | 5 | 4 | 4 | 1 | 1 | 7 | ±2 pp | 2,003 | 5 | |
| | 16 Aug | Beginning of the election campaign. | | | | | | | | | | | |
| | 15 Aug | Deadline for the registration of candidacies. | | | | | | | | | | | |

==== Apr–Aug ====
| Pollster | Polling period | | | | | | | Others (Note: So far, the announced candidates who have neither reached at least 3% in recent polls nor are affiliated with parties that passed the electoral threshold in 2022 are as follows: Aldo Rebelo (DC); Átila Maia (Democrat); Cabo Daciolo (Mobiliza); Edmilson Costa (PCB); Hertz Dias (PSTU); Leonardo Avalanche (PRTB); Rui Costa Pimenta (PCO); Samara Martins (UP)) | Blank Null Undec. | Margin of error | Sample size | Lead | Link |
| Pollster | Polling period | Lula PT | F. Bolsonaro PL | Caiado PSD | Zema Novo | Santos Mission | Cury Avante | Others | Blank Null Undec. | Margin of error | Sample size | Lead | Link |
|---|---|---|---|---|---|---|---|---|---|---|---|---|---|
| Quaest | 10–13 Aug | 38 | 31 | 4 | 2 | 4 | 2 | 1 | 18 | ±2 pp | 2,004 | 7 | |
| PoderData | 9–12 Aug | 41 | 35 | 4 | 3 | 4 | 3 | 3 | 6 | ±2 pp | 2,400 | 6 | |
| Nexus | 7–9 Aug | 40 | 35 | 5 | 3 | 4 | 1 | 3 | 8 | ±2 pp | 2,001 | 5 | |
| MDA | 5–9 Aug | 42.4 | 28.7 | 4 | 3.3 | 2.8 | 1.2 | 3.4 | 14 | ±2.2 pp | 2,002 | 13.7 | |
| Futura | 3–7 Aug | 38.8 | 34.1 | 5.9 | 3.6 | 3.6 | 1.2 | 2 | 11 | ±2.2 pp | 2,000 | 4.7 | |
| Futura | 3–7 Aug | 36.3 | 32.7 | 7.7 | 4.4 | 3.8 | 1.6 | 1.2 | 12.2 | ±2.2 pp | 2,000 | 3.6 | |
| Palver | 3–7 Aug | 44 | 40 | 2 | 1 | 10 | 0 | 1 | 1 | ±3 pp | 5,000 | 4 | |
| Palver | 3–7 Aug | 45 | 40 | 2 | 1 | 10 | —N/a | —N/a | 1 | ±3 pp | 5,000 | 5 | |
| | 3 Aug | Avante's National Convention officially nominated Augusto Cury for president. | | | | | | | | | | | |
| Quaest | 31 Jul – 3 Aug | 39 | 30 | 4 | 2 | 4 | 1 | 2 | 18 | ±2 pp | 2,004 | 9 | |
| Ideia | 31 Jul – 3 Aug | 43 | 35 | 5.7 | 2.6 | 4.7 | 1.7 | 1.3 | 6 | ±2.5 pp | 1,500 | 8 | |
| | 2 Aug | The Workers' Party's National Convention formally nominated Lula, with Geraldo Alckmin (PSB) as his running mate. | | | | | | | | | | | |
| Nexus | 31 Jul – 2 Aug | 41 | 37 | 5 | 3 | 4 | 1 | 2 | 7 | ±2 pp | 2,002 | 4 | |
| PoderData | 26–29 Jul | 41 | 35 | 5 | 3 | 4 | 3 | —N/a | 9 | ±2 pp | 2,400 | 6 | |
| Vox Brasil | 26–28 Jul | 40.5 | 31.2 | 5.5 | 3.2 | 3 | 1.1 | 3.6 | 11.9 | ±2.15 pp | 2,100 | 9.3 | |
| | 27 Jul | New Party's National Convention officially nominated Romeu Zema for president. | | | | | | | | | | | |
| AtlasIntel | 22–27 Jul | 44.9 | 35.8 | 3.1 | 2.8 | 7.8 | 1.6 | 2.3 | 1.6 | ±1 pp | 5,021 | 9.1 | |
| AtlasIntel | 22–27 Jul | 47.4 | 37 | 3.3 | 2.9 | 7.8 | —N/a | —N/a | 1.6 | ±1 pp | 5,021 | 10.4 | |
| | 26 Jul | Social Democratic Party's National Convention officially nominated Ronaldo Caiado, with Gilberto Kassab as his running mate. | | | | | | | | | | | |
| Nexus | 24–26 Jul | 42 | 33 | 6 | 3 | 5 | 2 | 1 | 8 | ±2 pp | 2,004 | 9 | |
| | 25 Jul | Liberal Party's National Convention officially nominated Flávio Bolsonaro for president. | | | | | | | | | | | |
| Datafolha | 22–23 Jul | 40 | 32 | 4 | 3 | 3 | 2 | 3 | 11 | ±2 pp | 2,004 | 8 | |
| | 20 Jul | The Mission Party's National Convention officially nominated Renan Santos, with Aroldo Medina as his running mate. | | | | | | | | | | | |
| | 20 Jul | Beginning of the period for party conventions. (Note: The period for party conventions runs from 20 July to 5 August. During this period, all political parties must formally nominate their candidates for every office they intend to contest. The deadline for registering candidates with the Superior Electoral Court is 15 August.) | | | | | | | | | | | |
| Real Time | 18–20 Jul | 40 | 33 | 7 | 2 | 9 | 1 | 2 | 6 | ±2 pp | 2,000 | 7 | |
| Indexa | 16–19 Jul | 41 | 30 | 6 | 3 | 3 | 1 | 1 | 15 | ±2.2 pp | 2,000 | 11 | |
| PoderData | 12–15 Jul | 40 | 34 | 4 | 4 | 6 | 3 | —N/a | 10 | ±2 pp | 2,400 | 6 | |
| Quaest | 10–13 Jul | 40 | 28 | 4 | 2 | 3 | 1 | 3 | 19 | ±2 pp | 2,004 | 12 | |
| Nexus | 10–12 Jul | 40 | 34 | 5 | 4 | 4 | 2 | 3 | 9 | ±2 pp | 2,003 | 6 | |
| Futura | 7–11 Jul | 40.1 | 36.8 | 5 | 3.7 | 2.6 | 1.1 | 2.1 | 8.7 | ±2.2 pp | 2,000 | 3.3 | |
| Futura | 7–11 Jul | 37.8 | 35.7 | 7.9 | 5 | 3.4 | —N/a | —N/a | 10.2 | ±2.2 pp | 2,000 | 2.1 | |
| Futura | 7–11 Jul | 42.1 | —N/a | 16.5 | 14 | 6 | —N/a | —N/a | 21.4 | ±2.2 pp | 2,000 | 25.6 | |
| Futura | 7–11 Jul | 42.6 | 38.6 | —N/a | 6.2 | 3.9 | —N/a | —N/a | 8.7 | ±2.2 pp | 2,000 | 4 | |
| | 8 Jul | Aécio Neves (PSDB) rules out a presidential bid. | | | | | | | | | | | |
| Ideia | 3–6 Jul | 40.4 | 32 | 4 | 2.5 | 2 | 1.5 | 4 (Note: This scenario included Aécio Neves (PSDB), who had not announced his candidacy but had been the subject of speculation.) | 13.6 | ±2.5 pp | 1,500 | 8.4 | |
| AtlasIntel | 26–30 Jun | 46.3 | 36.6 | 2.9 | 2 | 7.8 | 0.5 | 2.7 | 1.2 | ±1 pp | 4,999 | 9.7 | |
| AtlasIntel | 26–30 Jun | 47.2 | 36.3 | 3.1 | 3 | 7.8 | —N/a | 1.2 | 1.3 | ±1 pp | 4,999 | 10.9 | |
| Nexus | 26–28 Jun | 42 | 34 | 5 | 3 | 4 | 1 | 3 | 8 | ±2 pp | 2,009 | 8 | |
| Nexus | 26–28 Jun | 42 | 35 | 5 | 3 | 5 | —N/a | 2 | 8 | ±2 pp | 2,009 | 7 | |
| Vox Brasil | 23–25 Jun | 38.3 | 32.2 | 5.1 | 2.8 | 2.5 | 0.7 | 3.1 | 14.3 | ±2.15 pp | 2,100 | 6.1 | |
| PoderData | 21–24 Jun | 40 | 36 | 4 | 3 | 4 | 3 | 3 | 8 | ±2 pp | 2,400 | 4 | |
| Indexa | 18–20 Jun | 42 | 31 | 5 | 3 | 3 | 1 | 1 | 14 | ±2.2 pp | 2,000 | 11 | |
| Datafolha | 17–18 Jun | 41 | 31 | 3 | 2 | 3 | 2 | 7 | 11 | ±2 pp | 2,004 | 10 | |
| Nexus | 12–14 Jun | 42 | 33 | 4 | 2 | 4 | 2 | 4 | 8 | ±2 pp | 2,017 | 9 | |
| Nexus | 12–14 Jun | 43 | 34 | 4 | 3 | 5 | —N/a | 3 | 8 | ±2 pp | 2,017 | 9 | |
| MDA | 10–14 Jun | 41.8 | 28.2 | 4 | 2.8 | 2 | 1.8 | 4.2 | 14.9 | ±2.2 pp | 2,002 | 13.6 | |
| Futura | 8–12 Jun | 41.6 | 34.1 | 4.5 | 3.5 | 2.3 | 0.9 | 3.2 | 10 | ±2.2 pp | 2,000 | 7.5 | |
| Futura | 8–12 Jun | 39.8 | 32.8 | 8.5 | 5.3 | 3.5 | —N/a | —N/a | 10.1 | ±2.2 pp | 2,000 | 7 | |
| Futura | 8–12 Jun | 42.7 | —N/a | 16.5 | 13.3 | 6.1 | —N/a | —N/a | 21.5 | ±2.2 pp | 2,000 | 26.2 | |
| Quaest | 5–8 Jun | 39 | 29 | 3 | 2 | 3 | 1 | 4 | 19 | ±2 pp | 2,004 | 10 | |
| Vox Brasil | 1–3 Jun | 42.1 | 33.6 | 6.9 | 5.1 | 3.1 | 0.5 | 3.5 | 5.2 | ±2.15 pp | 2,100 | 8.5 | |
| Real Time | 29–30 May | 38 | 31 | 6 | 4 | 6 | 1 | 7 | 7 | ±2 pp | 2,000 | 7 | |
| PoderData | 25–28 May | 40 | 35 | 3 | 4 | 3 | 3 | 3 | 9 | ±2 pp | 2,400 | 5 | |
| Ideia | 23–27 May | 38.5 | 31.5 | 5.5 | 2.4 | 2.1 | —N/a | 4.4 | 15.6 | ±2.5 pp | 1,500 | 7 | |
| Indexa | 22–24 May | 39 | 30 | 5 | 3 | 2 | 0 | 3 | 18 | ±2.2 pp | 2,000 | 9 | |
| Nexus | 22–24 May | 40 | 35 | 5 | 4 | 3 | 1 | 3 | 9 | ±2 pp | 2,045 | 5 | |
| Nexus | 22–24 May | 41 | 35 | 5 | 4 | 4 | —N/a | 3 | 8 | ±2 pp | 2,045 | 6 | |
| Datafolha | 20–22 May | 40 | 31 | 4 | 3 | 3 | 2 | 6 | 12 | ±2 pp | 2,004 | 9 | |
| Futura | 15–20 May | 42.7 | 35.6 | 3.3 | 3.9 | 1.7 | 0.9 | 1.4 | 10.6 | ±2.2 pp | 2,000 | 7.1 | |
| Futura | 15–20 May | 39 | —N/a | 13.1 | 13.3 | 3.1 | 2.6 | 4.5 | 24.4 | ±2.2 pp | 2,000 | 25.7 | |
| Vox Brasil | 17–19 May | 41.5 | 32.1 | 5.9 | 4.1 | 1.5 | 0.3 | 0.3 | 14.3 | ±2.15 pp | 2,100 | 9.4 | |
| AtlasIntel | 13–18 May | 47 | 34.3 | 2.7 | 5.2 | 6.9 | 0.4 | 0.2 | 3.3 | ±1 pp | 5,032 | 12.7 | |
| AtlasIntel | 13–18 May | 46.7 | —N/a | 13.8 | 17 | 8 | 1.2 | 1.8 | 11.4 | ±1 pp | 5,032 | 29.7 | |
| | 13 May | Leaked audio recordings linked Flávio Bolsonaro to Daniel Vorcaro, a central figure in the Banco Master scandal. (Note: Messages and audio recordings released by the press show that Flávio Bolsonaro negotiated US$24 million (R$134 million) directly with Daniel Vorcaro, former owner of Banco Master and central figure in the scandal. The money was allegedly intended to finance the film Dark Horse, about Jair Bolsonaro 2018 presidential campaign. Documents show that at least US$10.6 million (R$61 million) was paid between February and May 2025 in six bank transfers. Analysis of the messages shows that part of the payments were made by Daniel Vorcaro to the Havengate Development Fund LP, based in Texas and linked to a lawyer for the Bolsonaro family.) | | | | | | | | | | | |
| Datafolha | 12–13 May | 38 | 35 | 3 | 3 | 2 | 2 | 4 | 12 | ±2 pp | 2,004 | 3 | |
| Vox Brasil | 9–12 May | 35.1 | 37.8 | 4.3 | 4.5 | 1.8 | 0.8 | 0.7 | 15 | ±2.15 pp | 2,100 | 2.7 | |
| | 11 May | Ciro Gomes (PSDB) confirms that he will run for Governor of Ceará, ending speculation about a presidential bid. | | | | | | | | | | | |
| Quaest | 8–11 May | 39 | 33 | 4 | 4 | 2 | 1 | 2 | 15 | ±2 pp | 2,004 | 6 | |
| Futura | 4–8 May | 38.1 | 37.4 | 5.7 | —N/a | 2.3 | 1.5 | 2.1 | 12.9 | ±2.2 pp | 2,000 | 0.7 | |
| Futura | 4–8 May | 38.3 | 36.1 | 4.4 | 3.6 | 1.5 | 1.4 | 5.1 (Note: This scenario included Ciro Gomes (PSDB), who had not announced his candidacy but had been the subject of speculation.) | 9.6 | ±2.2 pp | 2,000 | 2.2 | |
| Ideia | 1–5 May | 40 | 36 | 5.6 | 3 | 1.4 | 1.5 | 3.4 | 9.1 | ±2.5 pp | 1,500 | 4 | |
| Real Time | 2–4 May | 40 | 34 | 5 | 4 | 3 | 1 | 2 | 11 | ±2 pp | 2,000 | 6 | |
| Real Time | 2–4 May | 38 | 33 | 4 | 4 | 3 | 1 | 6 | 11 | ±2 pp | 2,000 | 5 | |
| AtlasIntel | 22–27 Apr | 46.6 | 39.7 | 3.3 | 3.1 | 5.3 | 1.1 | 0.3 | 0.6 | ±1 pp | 5,008 | 6.9 | |
| AtlasIntel | 22–27 Apr | 44.2 | 39.3 | 3 | 3.5 | 5.1 | 0.4 | 3.9 | 0.4 | ±1 pp | 5,008 | 4.9 | |
| Nexus | 24–26 Apr | 41 | 36 | 3 | 4 | 3 | 2 | 2 | 8 | ±2 pp | 2,028 | 5 | |
| Nexus | 24–26 Apr | 41 | 36 | 4 | 5 | 4 | —N/a | 1 | 9 | ±2 pp | 2,028 | 5 | |
| Nexus | 24–26 Apr | 41 | 38 | 6 | —N/a | 4 | —N/a | 1 | 9 | ±2 pp | 2,028 | 3 | |
| Quaest | 9–13 Apr | 37 | 32 | 6 | 3 | 2 | 2 | 2 | 16 | ±2 pp | 2,004 | 5 | |
| MDA | 8–12 Apr | 39.2 | 30.2 | 4.6 | 3.3 | 1.8 | —N/a | 1.5 | 19.3 | ±2 pp | 2,002 | 9 | |
| Futura | 7–11 Apr | 39.8 | 37.3 | 4.8 | 2.9 | 1.4 | 1.3 | 0.8 | 11.6 | ±2.2 pp | 2,000 | 2.5 | |
| Futura | 7–11 Apr | 38.4 | 38.2 | 6 | —N/a | 2 | 1.9 | 1.9 | 11.5 | ±2.2 pp | 2,000 | 0.2 | |
| Datafolha | 7–9 Apr | 39 | 35 | 5 | 4 | 2 | —N/a | 2 | 14 | ±2 pp | 2,004 | 4 | |
| Ideia | 3–7 Apr | 40.4 | 37 | 6.5 | 3 | 3 | —N/a | 0.6 | 9.5 | ±2.5 pp | 1,500 | 3.4 | |
| | 5 Apr | Avante announced the candidacy of writer Augusto Cury. | | | | | | | | | | | |
| | 4 Apr | Electoral resignation deadline. (Note: According to Brazilian electoral law, members of the executive branch (such as mayors, governors, and cabinet ministers) must leave office up to six months before the election if they intend to run for another position (except when seeking reelection).) (Note: Tarcísio de Freitas remained in office as governor in order to run for reelection. As a result, he is legally barred from running for president in 2026.) | | | | | | | | | | | |

==== Jan–Mar ====
| Pollster | Polling period | | | | | | | | Others | Blank Null Undec. | Margin of error | Sample size | Lead | Link |
| Pollster | Polling period | Lula PT | F. Bolsonaro PL | Freitas Repub. | Caiado PSD | Ratinho PSD | Leite PSD | Zema Novo | Others | Blank Null Undec. | Margin of error | Sample size | Lead | Link |
|---|---|---|---|---|---|---|---|---|---|---|---|---|---|---|
| | 30 Mar | PSD selects Ronaldo Caiado as its presidential candidate. | | | | | | | | | | | | |
| Nexus | 27–29 Mar | 41 | 38 | —N/a | 4 | —N/a | —N/a | 4 | 2 | 10 | ±2 pp | 2,000 | 3 | |
| Nexus | 27–29 Mar | 39 | 39 | —N/a | —N/a | —N/a | 4 | 5 | 4 | 9 | ±2 pp | 2,000 | Tie | |
| Nexus | 27–29 Mar | 42 | 39 | —N/a | —N/a | —N/a | —N/a | 6 | 4 | 8 | ±2 pp | 2,000 | 3 | |
| Paraná Pesquisas | 25–28 Mar | 41.3 | 37.8 | —N/a | 3.6 | —N/a | —N/a | 3 | 2.3 | 12 | ±2.2 pp | 2,080 | 3.5 | |
| Gerp | 20–25 Mar | 38 | 36 | —N/a | 3 | 4 | —N/a | 3 | 8 | 9 | ±2.2 pp | 2,000 | 2 | |
| AtlasIntel | 18–23 Mar | 45.9 | 40.1 | —N/a | 3.7 | —N/a | —N/a | 3.1 | 5 | 2.2 | ±1 pp | 5,028 | 5.8 | |
| AtlasIntel | 18–23 Mar | 45.5 | 42.4 | —N/a | —N/a | —N/a | 1.2 | 3.7 | 5.4 | 1.9 | ±1 pp | 5,028 | 3.1 | |
| AtlasIntel | 18–23 Mar | 45.6 | —N/a | 33.3 | 4.2 | —N/a | —N/a | 6.2 | 5.2 | 5.6 | ±1 pp | 5,028 | 12.3 | |
| AtlasIntel | 18–23 Mar | 45.7 | 35.8 | 7.9 | 2.8 | —N/a | —N/a | 1.6 | 4.8 | 1.4 | ±1 pp | 5,028 | 9.9 | |
| | 23 Mar | Ratinho Júnior withdraws his candidacy. | | | | | | | | | | | | |
| Ideia | 6–10 Mar | 40.3 | 35 | —N/a | 5.5 | —N/a | —N/a | 5 | 2.4 | 11.9 | ±2.5 pp | 1,500 | 5.3 | |
| Ideia | 6–10 Mar | 40 | 34.7 | —N/a | —N/a | 9 | —N/a | 4.5 | 2.2 | 9.5 | ±2.5 pp | 1,500 | 5.3 | |
| Ideia | 6–10 Mar | 39.6 | 36.3 | —N/a | —N/a | —N/a | 4.4 | 5.8 | 1.9 | 12 | ±2.5 pp | 1,500 | 3.3 | |
| Ideia | 6–10 Mar | 40.3 | —N/a | 35.9 | —N/a | —N/a | —N/a | 5.1 | 1.9 | 16.8 | ±2.5 pp | 1,500 | 4.4 | |
| Quaest | 6–9 Mar | 39 | 32 | —N/a | 4 | —N/a | —N/a | 2 | 2 | 21 | ±2 pp | 2,004 | 7 | |
| Quaest | 6–9 Mar | 37 | 30 | —N/a | —N/a | 7 | —N/a | 3 | 2 | 21 | ±2 pp | 2,004 | 7 | |
| Quaest | 6–9 Mar | 36 | 33 | —N/a | —N/a | —N/a | 3 | 3 | 4 | 21 | ±2 pp | 2,004 | 3 | |
| Quaest | 6–9 Mar | 36 | 34 | —N/a | 4 | —N/a | —N/a | —N/a | 4 | 22 | ±2 pp | 2,004 | 2 | |
| Quaest | 6–9 Mar | 36 | 33 | —N/a | —N/a | 7 | —N/a | —N/a | 4 | 20 | ±2 pp | 2,004 | 3 | |
| Quaest | 6–9 Mar | 36 | 35 | —N/a | —N/a | —N/a | 3 | —N/a | 4 | 22 | ±2 pp | 2,004 | 1 | |
| Quaest | 6–9 Mar | 37 | 34 | —N/a | —N/a | —N/a | —N/a | 3 | 4 | 22 | ±2 pp | 2,004 | 3 | |
| Futura | 2–6 Mar | 35.1 | 41.9 | —N/a | 5.7 | —N/a | —N/a | —N/a | 4.1 | 10.1 | ±2.2 pp | 2,000 | 6.8 | |
| Futura | 2–6 Mar | 37 | 37.6 | —N/a | —N/a | 9.1 | —N/a | 2.7 | 2.8 | 7.3 | ±2.2 pp | 2,000 | 0.6 | |
| Futura | 2–6 Mar | 35.2 | 41.2 | —N/a | —N/a | —N/a | 4.6 | —N/a | 7.2 | 9.4 | ±2.2 pp | 2,000 | 6 | |
| Futura | 2–6 Mar | 36.8 | —N/a | 24.4 | —N/a | —N/a | 4.8 | 5.7 | 7.6 | 15.9 | ±2.2 pp | 2,000 | 12.4 | |
| Datafolha | 3–5 Mar | 39 | 33 | —N/a | 4 | —N/a | —N/a | 5 | 5 | 15 | ±2 pp | 2,004 | 6 | |
| Datafolha | 3–5 Mar | 38 | 32 | —N/a | —N/a | 7 | —N/a | 4 | 5 | 14 | ±2 pp | 2,004 | 6 | |
| Datafolha | 3–5 Mar | 39 | —N/a | 21 | —N/a | 11 | —N/a | 5 | 5 | 19 | ±2 pp | 2,004 | 18 | |
| Datafolha | 3–5 Mar | 39 | 34 | —N/a | —N/a | —N/a | 3 | 4 | 5 | 15 | ±2 pp | 2,004 | 5 | |
| Real Time | 28 Feb – 2 Mar | 40 | 33 | —N/a | 5 | —N/a | —N/a | 3 | 4 | 15 | ±2 pp | 2,000 | 7 | |
| Real Time | 28 Feb – 2 Mar | 39 | 32 | —N/a | —N/a | 9 | —N/a | 2 | 4 | 14 | ±2 pp | 2,000 | 7 | |
| Real Time | 28 Feb – 2 Mar | 40 | 34 | —N/a | —N/a | —N/a | 4 | 3 | 4 | 15 | ±2 pp | 2,000 | 6 | |
| Paraná Pesquisas | 22–25 Feb | 40.5 | 36.6 | —N/a | 3.7 | —N/a | —N/a | 4.3 | 1.9 | 13 | ±2.2 pp | 2,080 | 3.9 | |
| Paraná Pesquisas | 22–25 Feb | 39.6 | 35.3 | —N/a | —N/a | 7.6 | —N/a | 3.8 | 2 | 11.7 | ±2.2 pp | 2,080 | 4.3 | |
| AtlasIntel | 19–24 Feb | 47.1 | 33.1 | 7.4 | 4.1 | —N/a | —N/a | 1.5 | 4.7 | 2.1 | ±1 pp | 4,986 | 14 | |
| AtlasIntel | 19–24 Feb | 43.3 | —N/a | 36.2 | 5.1 | —N/a | —N/a | 8.5 | 3.4 | 3.5 | ±1 pp | 4,986 | 7.1 | |
| AtlasIntel | 19–24 Feb | 45.1 | 39.5 | —N/a | —N/a | 3.8 | —N/a | 3.9 | 4.3 | 3.4 | ±1 pp | 4,986 | 5.6 | |
| AtlasIntel | 19–24 Feb | 45 | 37.9 | —N/a | 4.9 | —N/a | —N/a | 3.9 | 4 | 4.3 | ±1 pp | 4,986 | 7.1 | |
| AtlasIntel | 19–24 Feb | 45.3 | 39.1 | —N/a | —N/a | —N/a | 1.6 | 5.7 | 4.9 | 3.5 | ±1 pp | 4,986 | 6.2 | |
| Quaest | 5–9 Feb | 38 | 30 | —N/a | 4 | —N/a | —N/a | 4 | 2 | 22 | ±2 pp | 2,004 | 8 | |
| Quaest | 5–9 Feb | 39 | 32 | —N/a | 4 | —N/a | —N/a | —N/a | 3 | 22 | ±2 pp | 2,004 | 7 | |
| Quaest | 5–9 Feb | 35 | 29 | —N/a | —N/a | 8 | —N/a | 4 | 2 | 22 | ±2 pp | 2,004 | 6 | |
| Quaest | 5–9 Feb | 37 | 31 | —N/a | —N/a | 7 | —N/a | —N/a | 4 | 21 | ±2 pp | 2,004 | 6 | |
| Real Time | 6–7 Feb | 39 | 30 | —N/a | —N/a | 10 | —N/a | 3 | 3 | 15 | ±2 pp | 2,000 | 9 | |
| Real Time | 6–7 Feb | 40 | 32 | —N/a | 6 | —N/a | —N/a | 4 | 3 | 15 | ±2 pp | 2,000 | 8 | |
| Futura | 3–7 Feb | 36.7 | 34.2 | 9.8 | —N/a | —N/a | —N/a | 4 | 5 | 10.2 | ±2.2 pp | 2,000 | 2.5 | |
| Futura | 3–7 Feb | 35.3 | 35.7 | —N/a | 6.6 | —N/a | —N/a | 6.5 | 3.2 | 12.7 | ±2.2 pp | 2,000 | 0.2 | |
| Futura | 3–7 Feb | 35.9 | 37.2 | —N/a | —N/a | 6.1 | —N/a | 4.9 | 3.1 | 12.8 | ±2.2 pp | 2,000 | 1.3 | |
| Gerp | 28 Jan – 2 Feb | 39 | 35 | —N/a | 2 | 5 | —N/a | 2 | 4 | 11 | ±2.2 pp | 2,000 | 4 | |
| Ideia | 30 Jan – 2 Feb | 39.5 | 32 | —N/a | —N/a | 8.8 | —N/a | 3 | 1.2 | 15.5 | ±2.5 pp | 1,500 | 7.5 | |
| Ideia | 30 Jan – 2 Feb | 39.5 | 33 | —N/a | 5.1 | —N/a | —N/a | 6 | 1.2 | 15.1 | ±2.5 pp | 1,500 | 6.5 | |
| Ideia | 30 Jan – 2 Feb | 40 | —N/a | 35 | —N/a | —N/a | —N/a | 6.5 | 1.5 | 17 | ±2.5 pp | 1,500 | 5 | |
| | 27 Jan | Ronaldo Caiado joins the PSD. | | | | | | | | | | | | |
| Paraná Pesquisas | 25–28 Jan | 39.8 | 33.1 | —N/a | 3.7 | 6.5 | —N/a | 2.8 | 2.6 | 11.5 | ±2.2 pp | 2,080 | 6.7 | |
| Paraná Pesquisas | 25–28 Jan | 40.7 | —N/a | 27.5 | 6.6 | —N/a | —N/a | 4.4 | 3.4 | 17.4 | ±2.2 pp | 2,080 | 13.2 | |
| AtlasIntel | 15–20 Jan | 48.4 | 28 | 11 | 2.9 | 1.7 | —N/a | 1.7 | 3.9 | 2.4 | ±1 pp | 5,418 | 20.4 | |
| AtlasIntel | 15–20 Jan | 48.8 | 35 | —N/a | 4.3 | 2.8 | —N/a | 2.8 | 4.4 | 1.9 | ±1 pp | 5,418 | 13.8 | |
| AtlasIntel | 15–20 Jan | 48.5 | —N/a | 28.4 | 5 | 3.9 | —N/a | 3.9 | 4.3 | 6.1 | ±1 pp | 5,418 | 20.1 | |
| AtlasIntel | 15–20 Jan | 48.8 | —N/a | —N/a | 15.2 | 9.4 | —N/a | 11.4 | 4.9 | 10.3 | ±1 pp | 5,418 | 33.6 | |
| Futura | 15–19 Jan | 37 | 33.3 | 10.5 | 3 | —N/a | —N/a | 2.6 | 1.7 | 11.9 | ±2.2 pp | 2,000 | 3.7 | |
| Futura | 15–19 Jan | 35.4 | 34.3 | —N/a | 3.7 | 9.1 | —N/a | 4.4 | 2.4 | 4.4 | ±2.2 pp | 2,000 | 1.1 | |
| Ideia | 8–12 Jan | 39.7 | 26.5 | —N/a | 4.2 | 7 | —N/a | 3.6 | 0.6 | 18.5 | ±2.2 pp | 2,000 | 13.2 | |
| Ideia | 8–12 Jan | 40.2 | —N/a | 32.7 | 5.5 | —N/a | —N/a | 5.5 | 0.9 | 15.4 | ±2.2 pp | 2,000 | 7.5 | |
| Quaest | 8–11 Jan | 36 | 23 | 9 | 3 | 7 | —N/a | 2 | 2 | 18 | ±2 pp | 2,004 | 13 | |
| Quaest | 8–11 Jan | 35 | 26 | —N/a | 4 | 9 | —N/a | 3 | 3 | 20 | ±2 pp | 2,004 | 9 | |
| Quaest | 8–11 Jan | 39 | —N/a | 27 | 5 | —N/a | —N/a | —N/a | 7 | 22 | ±2 pp | 2,004 | 12 | |
| Quaest | 8–11 Jan | 40 | 23 | 14 | —N/a | —N/a | —N/a | —N/a | 4 | 19 | ±2 pp | 2,004 | 17 | |
| Quaest | 8–11 Jan | 37 | 28 | —N/a | —N/a | 11 | —N/a | —N/a | 4 | 20 | ±2 pp | 2,004 | 9 | |

=== 2025 ===
==== Jun–Dec ====
| Polling firm | Polling period | Lula | F. Bolsonaro | Freitas | Gomes | Ratinho | Zema | Caiado | Others (Note: Refers to the total for other eligible and ineligible candidates, not registered in a party and that did not frequently polled above 3%.) | Blank Null Undec. (Note: Refers to the total, "raw" sample size, including undecided and non-voters.) | Margin of error (Note: In cases when linked poll details distinguish between the margin of error associated with the total sample of respondents (including undecided and non-voters) and that of the subsample of decided/leaning voters, the former is included in the table. Also not included is the margin of error created by rounding to the nearest whole number or any margin of error from methodological sources. Most online polls (because of their opt-in method of recruiting panelists which results in a non-random sample) cannot have a margin of error. In such cases, shown is what the margin of error would be for a survey using a random probability-based sample of equivalent size.) | Sample size | Lead | Link |
|---|---|---|---|---|---|---|---|---|---|---|---|---|---|---|
| Paraná Pesquisas | 18–22 Dec | 37.6 | 27.8 | —N/a | 7.9 | 9 | 3.1 | —N/a | 2.7 | 12 | ±2.2 pp | 2,038 | 9.8 | |
| Paraná Pesquisas | 18–22 Dec | 37.8 | —N/a | 26.2 | 8.7 | —N/a | 3.9 | 5 | 3.3 | 15 | ±2.2 pp | 2,038 | 11.6 | |
| AtlasIntel | 10–15 Dec | 47.9 | 21.3 | 15 | —N/a | 4.1 | 3 | 4.4 | 2.4 | 2 | ±1 pp | 18,154 | 26.6 | |
| AtlasIntel | 10–15 Dec | 48.1 | 29.3 | —N/a | —N/a | 3.9 | 3.8 | 7.2 | 4.4 | 3.3 | ±1 pp | 18,154 | 18.8 | |
| AtlasIntel | 10–15 Dec | 48.8 | —N/a | 28.3 | —N/a | 3.4 | 3.8 | 5.5 | 3 | 7.3 | ±1 pp | 18,154 | 20.5 | |
| AtlasIntel | 10–15 Dec | 48.8 | —N/a | —N/a | —N/a | 9 | 11.7 | 16.3 | 3.6 | 10.5 | ±1 pp | 18,154 | 32.5 | |
| Quaest | 11–14 Dec | 41 | 23 | 10 | —N/a | —N/a | —N/a | —N/a | 3 | 23 | ±2 pp | 2,004 | 18 | |
| Quaest | 11–14 Dec | 39 | 23 | —N/a | —N/a | 13 | —N/a | —N/a | 4 | 21 | ±2 pp | 2,004 | 16 | |
| Quaest | 11–14 Dec | 34 | 21 | —N/a | 8 | 12 | 4 | 2 | 2 | 17 | ±2 pp | 2,004 | 13 | |
| Gerp | 6–10 Dec | 34 | 25 | —N/a | 7 | 8 | 4 | 6 | 4 | 12 | ±2.2 pp | 2,000 | 9 | |
| | 5 Dec | Flávio Bolsonaro announces his candidacy, stating that he was endorsed by his father, Jair Bolsonaro, during a prison visit. | | | | | | | | | | | | |
| Ipec | 4–8 Dec | 38 | —N/a | 17 | —N/a | 9 | 3 | 5 | —N/a | 27 | ±2 pp | 2,000 | 21 | |
| Ipec | 4–8 Dec | 38 | 19 | —N/a | —N/a | 9 | 5 | 7 | —N/a | 23 | ±2 pp | 2,000 | 19 | |
| Datafolha | 2–4 Dec | 41 | —N/a | 23 | —N/a | 11 | 3 | 6 | —N/a | 16 | ±2 pp | 2,002 | 18 | |
| Datafolha | 2–4 Dec | 41 | 18 | —N/a | —N/a | 12 | 6 | 7 | —N/a | 16 | ±2 pp | 2,002 | 23 | |
| AtlasIntel | 22–27 Nov | 48.4 | —N/a | 32.5 | —N/a | 4.1 | 2.3 | 5.7 | 1.9 | 5 | ±1 pp | 5,510 | 15.9 | |
| AtlasIntel | 22–27 Nov | 47.3 | 23.1 | —N/a | —N/a | 7.1 | 5 | 10.2 | 2.4 | 4.8 | ±1 pp | 5,510 | 24.2 | |
| | 22 Nov | Jair Bolsonaro is arrested by the Federal Police and transferred to prison for attempting to escape house arrest. | | | | | | | | | | | | |
| MDA | 19–23 Nov | 42 | —N/a | 21.7 | —N/a | 11.8 | 5.7 | —N/a | —N/a | 18.8 | ±2.2 pp | 2,002 | 20.3 | |
| MDA | 19–23 Nov | 38 | —N/a | —N/a | 9.6 | 6.4 | 2.7 | 4 | 27 | 11.5 | ±2.2 pp | 2,002 | 11 | |
| Paraná Pesquisas | 6–10 Nov | 36 | —N/a | 23.2 | 9.7 | 9 | 3.3 | 4.5 | —N/a | 14.3 | ±2.2 pp | 2,020 | 12.8 | |
| Paraná Pesquisas | 6–10 Nov | 36.3 | 19.7 | —N/a | 9.9 | 10.5 | 4.8 | 5.2 | —N/a | 13.6 | ±2.2 pp | 2,020 | 16.6 | |
| Quaest | 6–9 Nov | 35 | —N/a | 16 | 12 | —N/a | 5 | 4 | —N/a | 28 | ±2 pp | 2,004 | 20 | |
| Paraná Pesquisas | 21–24 Oct | 37.4 | —N/a | 22.3 | 9 | 8.1 | 5.7 | 4.1 | —N/a | 13.4 | ±2.2 pp | 2,020 | 15.1 | |
| Paraná Pesquisas | 21–24 Oct | 37.6 | 19.2 | —N/a | 8.9 | 9.6 | 6.2 | 4.8 | —N/a | 13.6 | ±2.2 pp | 2,020 | 18.4 | |
| AtlasIntel | 15–19 Oct | 51.3 | —N/a | 30.4 | —N/a | 3 | 2.5 | 6 | —N/a | 6.9 | ±1 pp | 14,063 | 20.9 | |
| Quaest | 2–5 Oct | 39 | —N/a | 18 | 12 | —N/a | 4 | 4 | —N/a | 23 | ±2 pp | 2,004 | 21 | |
| Gerp | 29 Sep – 6 Oct | 27 | —N/a | 23 | 7 | 5 | 3 | 3 | 8 | 24 | ±2 pp | 2,000 | 4 | |
| Quaest | 12–14 Sep | 35 | —N/a | 17 | 13 | —N/a | 5 | 6 | —N/a | 24 | ±2 pp | 2,004 | 18 | |
| | 11 Sep | Jair Bolsonaro is sentenced to 27 years in prison for leading a coup plot. | | | | | | | | | | | | |
| AtlasIntel | 10–14 Sep | 48.2 | —N/a | 30.4 | 4.3 | 2.6 | 3 | 3.7 | 2 | 5.7 | ±1 pp | 7,291 | 17.8 | |
| MDA | 3–6 Sep | 35.8 | —N/a | 17.1 | 11.6 | 10 | 3.6 | 4.2 | —N/a | 17.7 | ±2 pp | 2,002 | 18.7 | |
| Real Time | 28–30 Aug | 42 | —N/a | 40 | —N/a | —N/a | 4 | —N/a | 2 | 9 | ±3 pp | 2,500 | 2 | |
| AtlasIntel | 20–25 Aug | 44.1 | —N/a | 31.8 | 3.4 | 4 | 4.4 | 3.2 | 5 | 4.2 | ±1 pp | 6,238 | 12.3 | |
| Paraná Pesquisas | 17–21 Aug | 35.1 | —N/a | 24.5 | 9.9 | 8.8 | —N/a | 4.6 | 1.2 | 15.9 | ±2.2 pp | 2,020 | 10.6 | |
| Quaest | 13–17 Aug | 35 | —N/a | 17 | 11 | —N/a | 4 | 6 | —N/a | 27 | ±2 pp | 12,150 | 18 | |
| Quaest | 13–17 Aug | 35 | 14 | —N/a | 10 | 9 | 6 | 5 | —N/a | 21 | ±2 pp | 12,150 | 21 | |
| Datafolha | 29–30 Jul | 38 | —N/a | 21 | —N/a | 12 | 6 | 7 | —N/a | 17 | ±2 pp | 2,004 | 17 | |
| Datafolha | 29–30 Jul | 40 | 18 | —N/a | —N/a | 11 | 7 | 8 | —N/a | 16 | ±2 pp | 2,004 | 22 | |
| AtlasIntel | 25–28 Jul | 48.5 | —N/a | 33 | 2.9 | 3.6 | 3.6 | 3 | 2.6 | 2.8 | ±1 pp | 7,334 | 15.5 | |
| Quaest | 10–14 Jul | 32 | —N/a | 15 | 12 | —N/a | 4 | 5 | —N/a | 32 | ±2 pp | 2,004 | 17 | |
| AtlasIntel | 27–30 Jun | 44.6 | —N/a | 34 | 3.5 | 2.5 | 4.4 | 1.7 | 4.7 | 4.6 | ±2 pp | 2,621 | 10.6 | |
| Neokemp | 25–27 Jun | 35 | —N/a | 37.5 | 10.2 | —N/a | —N/a | 4.9 | —N/a | 12.5 | ±2.2 pp | 2,020 | 2.5 | |
| Futura | 12–23 Jun | 28.2 | —N/a | 26.3 | 14.4 | —N/a | —N/a | 6 | —N/a | 25.1 | ±2.2 pp | 2,000 | 1.9 | |
| Paraná Pesquisas | 18–22 Jun | 34 | —N/a | 24.3 | 13.5 | 6.9 | —N/a | 4.3 | —N/a | 16.1 | ±2.2 pp | 2,020 | 9.7 | |
| Paraná Pesquisas | 18–22 Jun | 33.8 | 20.4 | —N/a | 13.8 | 9 | —N/a | 5.8 | 1.1 | 16.1 | ±2.2 pp | 2,020 | 13.4 | |
| MDA | 11–15 Jun | 30.5 | —N/a | 18.3 | 14.6 | 8.1 | 4 | 4.1 | —N/a | 20.4 | ±2 pp | 2,002 | 12.2 | |
| Datafolha | 10–11 Jun | 37 | —N/a | 21 | —N/a | 11 | 6 | 6 | —N/a | 19 | ±2 pp | 2,004 | 16 | |
| Datafolha | 10–11 Jun | 38 | 20 | —N/a | —N/a | 12 | —N/a | 11 | —N/a | 19 | ±2 pp | 2,004 | 18 | |

==== Jan–May ====
| Polling firm | Polling period | Lula | Freitas | Gomes | Ratinho | Zema | Caiado | Others | Blank Null Undec. | Margin of error | Sample size | Lead | Link |
|---|---|---|---|---|---|---|---|---|---|---|---|---|---|
| Gerp | 28–31 May | 24 | 18 | 9 | 7 | 3 | 5 | 9 | 25 | ±2.2 pp | 2,000 | 6 | |
| AtlasIntel | 19–23 May | 44.1 | 33.1 | 3 | —N/a | 1.4 | 4.7 | 8.3 | 5.4 | ±1 pp | 4,399 | 11 | |
| Gerp | 21–25 Apr | 30 | 19 | 9 | —N/a | 4 | 4 | 7 | 18 | ±2.2 pp | 2,000 | 11 | |
| AtlasIntel | 20–24 Apr | 42.8 | 34.3 | 2.7 | —N/a | 1.6 | 4.3 | 6.4 | 8 | ±1 pp | 5,419 | 8.5 | |
| Paraná Pesquisas | 16–19 Apr | 34 | 27.3 | 12.6 | —N/a | —N/a | 4.8 | 5.5 | 15.7 | ±2.2 pp | 2,020 | 6.7 | |
| Datafolha | 1–3 Apr | 35 | 15 | 11 | —N/a | 3 | 2 | 18 | 14 | ±2 pp | 3,054 | 20 | |
| AtlasIntel | 24–27 Feb | 41.6 | 32.3 | —N/a | —N/a | 4.5 | 4.5 | 4.5 | 12.6 | ±1 pp | 5,710 | 9.3 | |
| MDA | 19–23 Feb | 30.4 | 14 | 14.3 | —N/a | 3.9 | 3.9 | 13.2 | 20.2 | ±2.2 pp | 2,002 | 16.1 | |
| Quaest | 23–26 Jan | 30 | 13 | 9 | —N/a | 3 | 3 | 23 | 19 | ±1 pp | 4,500 | 17 | |

=== 2024 and earlier ===
| Polling firm | Polling period | Lula | Haddad | Freitas | J. Bolsonaro (Note: Ineligible.) | Marçal | M. Bolsonaro | Gomes | Zema | Ratinho | Moro | Caiado | Leite | Barbalho | Tebet | Cristina | Blank Null Undec. | Margin of error | Sample size | Lead | Link |
|---|---|---|---|---|---|---|---|---|---|---|---|---|---|---|---|---|---|---|---|---|---|
| Paraná Pesquisas | 21–25 Nov 2024 | 33.6 | —N/a | —N/a | 37.6 | —N/a | —N/a | 7.9 | —N/a | —N/a | —N/a | 3.7 | —N/a | —N/a | 7.7 | —N/a | 9.6 | — | 2,014 | 4 | |
| Paraná Pesquisas | 21–25 Nov 2024 | 34.2 | —N/a | —N/a | —N/a | —N/a | 27.5 | 10.2 | —N/a | —N/a | —N/a | 6.4 | —N/a | —N/a | 8.2 | —N/a | 13.5 | — | 2,014 | 6.7 | |
| Paraná Pesquisas | 21–25 Nov 2024 | 34.7 | —N/a | 24.1 | —N/a | —N/a | —N/a | 11.5 | —N/a | —N/a | —N/a | 5.3 | —N/a | —N/a | 8.4 | —N/a | 16.1 | — | 2,014 | 10.6 | |
| Paraná Pesquisas | 21–25 Nov 2024 | 34.4 | —N/a | —N/a | —N/a | —N/a | —N/a | 12.8 | —N/a | 15.3 | —N/a | 8.9 | —N/a | —N/a | 8.7 | —N/a | 19.9 | — | 2,014 | 19.1 | |
| Paraná Pesquisas | 21–25 Nov 2024 | 34.7 | —N/a | —N/a | —N/a | —N/a | —N/a | 13.4 | 12.2 | —N/a | —N/a | 8 | —N/a | —N/a | 9.5 | —N/a | 22.2 | — | 2,014 | 21.3 | |
| Paraná Pesquisas | 21–25 Nov 2024 | —N/a | 14.5 | —N/a | 38.3 | —N/a | —N/a | 14.2 | —N/a | —N/a | —N/a | 4.4 | —N/a | —N/a | 13 | —N/a | 15.6 | — | 2,014 | 23.8 | |
| Paraná Pesquisas | 21–25 Nov 2024 | —N/a | 14.9 | —N/a | —N/a | —N/a | 27.6 | 17 | —N/a | —N/a | —N/a | 7.1 | —N/a | —N/a | 13.5 | —N/a | 19.9 | — | 2,014 | 10.6 | |
| MDA | 7–10 Nov 2024 | 35.2 | —N/a | —N/a | 32.2 | 8.4 | —N/a | 6.2 | —N/a | —N/a | —N/a | —N/a | —N/a | —N/a | 8 | —N/a | 10 | ±2.2 pp | 2,002 | 3 | |
| MDA | 7–10 Nov 2024 | 34.1 | —N/a | —N/a | —N/a | 14.1 | 20.5 | 9.3 | —N/a | —N/a | —N/a | —N/a | —N/a | —N/a | 9.2 | —N/a | 12.8 | ±2.2 pp | 2,002 | 13.6 | |
| MDA | 7–10 Nov 2024 | 35.2 | —N/a | 15 | —N/a | 16.9 | —N/a | 9.4 | —N/a | —N/a | —N/a | —N/a | —N/a | —N/a | 9.5 | —N/a | 14 | ±2.2 pp | 2,002 | 18.3 | |
| Paraná Pesquisas | 18–22 Jul 2024 | 38.3 | —N/a | —N/a | 36.9 | —N/a | —N/a | 7.9 | —N/a | —N/a | —N/a | 3 | 1.9 | 0.5 | —N/a | —N/a | 11.6 | ±2.2 pp | 2,026 | 1.4 | |
| Paraná Pesquisas | 18–22 Jul 2024 | 38.7 | —N/a | —N/a | —N/a | —N/a | 30.3 | 9.1 | —N/a | —N/a | —N/a | 4.5 | 2.3 | 0.6 | —N/a | —N/a | 14.5 | ±2.2 pp | 2,026 | 8.4 | |
| Paraná Pesquisas | 18–22 Jul 2024 | 38.9 | —N/a | 24.4 | —N/a | —N/a | —N/a | 11.8 | —N/a | —N/a | —N/a | 4 | 2.7 | 0.6 | —N/a | —N/a | 17.6 | ±2.2 pp | 2,026 | 14.5 | |
| Paraná Pesquisas | 18–22 Jul 2024 | 39 | —N/a | —N/a | —N/a | —N/a | —N/a | 12.4 | —N/a | 14.2 | —N/a | 7.5 | 3.3 | 0.7 | —N/a | —N/a | 22.8 | ±2.2 pp | 2,026 | 24.8 | |
| Paraná Pesquisas | 18–22 Jul 2024 | 38.8 | —N/a | —N/a | —N/a | —N/a | —N/a | 13.3 | 13.1 | —N/a | —N/a | 6.7 | 3.5 | 0.8 | —N/a | —N/a | 23.9 | ±2.2 pp | 2,026 | 25.5 | |
| Quaest | 2–6 May | 46 | —N/a | 40 | —N/a | —N/a | —N/a | —N/a | —N/a | —N/a | —N/a | —N/a | —N/a | —N/a | —N/a | —N/a | 14 | ±2.2 pp | 2,045 | 6 | |
| Paraná Pesquisas | 27 Apr – 1 May 2024 | 36 | —N/a | —N/a | 38.8 | —N/a | —N/a | 8.4 | —N/a | —N/a | —N/a | —N/a | 3.4 | 1.0 | —N/a | —N/a | 12.3 | ±2.2 pp | 2,020 | 2.8 | |
| Paraná Pesquisas | 27 Apr – 1 May 2024 | 36.6 | —N/a | —N/a | —N/a | —N/a | 33 | 10.1 | —N/a | —N/a | —N/a | —N/a | 3.8 | 1.4 | —N/a | —N/a | 15.0 | ±2.2 pp | 2,020 | 3.6 | |
| Paraná Pesquisas | 27 Apr – 1 May 2024 | 36.9 | —N/a | 25.6 | —N/a | —N/a | —N/a | 11.8 | —N/a | —N/a | —N/a | —N/a | 3.8 | 1.3 | —N/a | —N/a | 20.7 | ±2.2 pp | 2,020 | 11.3 | |
| Paraná Pesquisas | 27 Apr – 1 May 2024 | 37.2 | —N/a | —N/a | —N/a | —N/a | —N/a | 14.7 | —N/a | —N/a | —N/a | 10.9 | 5.6 | 1.7 | —N/a | —N/a | 29.8 | ±2.2 pp | 2,020 | 22.5 | |
| Paraná Pesquisas | 27 Apr – 1 May 2024 | 36.9 | —N/a | —N/a | —N/a | —N/a | —N/a | 15.2 | —N/a | —N/a | —N/a | —N/a | 6.5 | 1.9 | —N/a | 15.2 | 31.0 | ±2.2 pp | 2,020 | 21.7 | |
| Paraná Pesquisas | 27 Apr – 1 May 2024 | 36.3 | —N/a | —N/a | —N/a | —N/a | —N/a | 13.8 | —N/a | 17.6 | —N/a | —N/a | 4.9 | 1.6 | —N/a | —N/a | 25.9 | ±2.2 pp | 2,020 | 18.7 | |
| Paraná Pesquisas | 27 Apr – 1 May 2024 | 37.2 | —N/a | —N/a | —N/a | —N/a | —N/a | 14.8 | 14.9 | —N/a | —N/a | —N/a | 5.1 | 1.8 | —N/a | —N/a | 26.3 | ±2.2 pp | 2,020 | 22.3 | |
| Paraná Pesquisas | 24–28 Jan 2024 | 37.6 | —N/a | —N/a | —N/a | —N/a | 23 | 9.3 | 6.5 | 5.1 | —N/a | 1.9 | —N/a | 0.9 | —N/a | —N/a | 15.6 | ±3.4 pp | 2,026 | 14.6 | |
| Paraná Pesquisas | 24–28 Jan 2024 | 37.4 | —N/a | 17.4 | —N/a | —N/a | —N/a | 10.3 | 5.8 | 6.2 | —N/a | 2.1 | —N/a | 1.1 | —N/a | —N/a | 19.6 | ±3.4 pp | 2,026 | 20 | |
| Paraná Pesquisas | 24–28 Jan 2024 | 36.9 | —N/a | —N/a | 33.8 | —N/a | —N/a | 7.8 | 3.9 | 3.9 | —N/a | 1.2 | —N/a | 0.8 | —N/a | —N/a | 11.7 | ±3.4 pp | 2,026 | 3.1 | |
| Paraná Pesquisas | 29 Sep – 3 Oct 2023 | 36.6 | —N/a | 12.7 | —N/a | —N/a | —N/a | 6.3 | 5.7 | 4.6 | 6.7 | 1.2 | 2.1 | —N/a | 7.4 | 1.9 | 14.9 | ±2.2 pp | 2,020 | 23.9 | |
| Paraná Pesquisas | 29 Sep – 3 Oct 2023 | 37.6 | —N/a | 18.9 | —N/a | —N/a | —N/a | 8.7 | —N/a | —N/a | —N/a | —N/a | 3.7 | —N/a | 9.0 | —N/a | 22.2 | ±2.2 pp | 2,020 | 18.7 | |
| Paraná Pesquisas | 29 Sep – 3 Oct 2023 | 37.6 | —N/a | —N/a | —N/a | —N/a | —N/a | 8.8 | 15.3 | —N/a | —N/a | —N/a | 4.0 | —N/a | 8.8 | —N/a | 25.5 | ±2.2 pp | 2,020 | 22.3 | |
| Paraná Pesquisas | 29 Sep – 3 Oct 2023 | 37.7 | —N/a | —N/a | —N/a | —N/a | —N/a | 9.2 | —N/a | 12.8 | —N/a | —N/a | 4.1 | —N/a | 8.7 | —N/a | 27.4 | ±2.2 pp | 2,020 | 24.9 | |

== Second round ==
=== Graphical summary ===
Aggregate data of voting intention from opinion polling for the presidential election. Each line represents a local regression. The "Undecided", "Blank/Null" and "Absent" groups were calculated out.

=== Polling aggregation ===
| Aggregator | Last update | | | Blank Null Undec. | Margin of error | Lead | Link |
| Aggregator | Last update | Lula PT | F. Bolsonaro PL | Blank Null Undec. | Margin of error | Lead | Link |
|---|---|---|---|---|---|---|---|
| Poll+Trend (Final) | 24 October 2026 | 49.94 | 50.06 | —N/a | ±2.5 pp | 0.12 | |
| UOL | 24 October 2026 | 49 | 51 | —N/a | —N/a | 2 | |
| BBC/PollingData | 24 October 2026 | 46.2 | 47.5 | 6.3 | ±3 pp | 1.3 | |
| Plano Político | 24 October 2026 | 46.4 | 48.1 | 5.5 | ±1.8 pp | 1.7 | |
| The Economist | 22 October 2026 | 46 | 48 | 6 | —N/a | 2 | |
| PollsterGraph | 24 October 2026 | 46.1 | 47.7 | 6.2 | —N/a | 1.6 | |

=== 2026 ===
==== October (after 1st round) ====
| Pollster | Polling period | | | Blank Null Undec. | Margin of error | Sample size | Lead | Link |
| Pollster | Polling period | Lula PT | F. Bolsonaro PL | Blank Null Undec. | Margin of error | Sample size | Lead | Link |
|---|---|---|---|---|---|---|---|---|
| Results | 25 Oct | 51.79 | 48.21 | —N/a | —N/a | Valid votes | 3.58 | |
| Results | 25 Oct | 50.11 | 46.65 | 3.24 | —N/a | Total votes | 3.46 | |
| Futura | 23–24 Oct | 47.9 | 48.2 | 3.9 | ±2.2 pp | 2,000 | 0.3 | |
| Quaest | 23–24 Oct | 45 | 46 | 9 | ±2 pp | 3,702 | 1 | |
| Datafolha | 23–24 Oct | 47 | 48 | 5 | ±2 pp | 4,050 | 1 | |
| Nexus | 23–24 Oct | 46 | 47 | 7 | ±2.2 pp | 2,000 | 1 | |
| PoderData | 23–24 Oct | 48 | 49 | 4 | ±1.6 pp | 4,000 | 1 | |
| Palver | 22–24 Oct | 49 | 50 | 1 | ±2.2 pp | 5,000 | 1 | |
| Gerp | 22–24 Oct | 46 | 49 | 4 | ±2 pp | 2,400 | 3 | |
| | 23 Oct | Second presidential debate of the second round. | | | | | | |
| Colectta | 23 Oct | 46.5 | 46 | 7.5 | ±2 pp | 3,000 | 0.5 | |
| MDA | 21–23 Oct | 45 | 46.3 | 8.7 | ±2.2 pp | 2,032 | 1.3 | |
| Instituto França | 21–23 Oct | 43.1 | 45.1 | 11.3 | ±2.5 pp | 1,537 | 2 | |
| Verita | 19–23 Oct | 47.8 | 49.8 | 2.4 | ±1 pp | 15,554 | 2 | |
| AtlasIntel | 18–23 Oct | 48.4 | 49.9 | 1.7 | ±1 pp | 4,990 | 1.5 | |
| Ipespe | 20–22 Oct | 47 | 48 | 5 | ±2.6 pp | 1,500 | 1 | |
| Vox Brasil | 20–22 Oct | 45.4 | 44.3 | 10.3 | ±2.15 pp | 2,100 | 1.1 | |
| Datafolha | 20–22 Oct | 46 | 47 | 7 | ±2 pp | 2,520 | 1 | |
| Alfa | 19–22 Oct | 46 | 49.9 | 4.1 | ±1.9 pp | 2,700 | 3.9 | |
| Real Time | 19–22 Oct | 45 | 49 | 6 | ±2 pp | 2,000 | 4 | |
| Veritá | 18–22 Oct | 47.5 | 50.2 | 2.3 | ±1 pp | 15,554 | 2.7 | |
| Indexa | 20–21 Oct | 44.1 | 45.2 | 10.7 | ±2.2 pp | 2,000 | 1.1 | |
| Datatrends | 19–21 Oct | 46 | 50 | 4 | ±2.19 pp | 2,000 | 4 | |
| PoderData | 19–21 Oct | 48 | 49 | 4 | ±1.6 pp | 4,000 | 1 | |
| Gerp | 19–21 Oct | 45 | 50 | 5 | ±2.0 pp | 2,400 | 5 | |
| Futura | 19–20 Oct | 46.8 | 48.9 | 4.3 | ±2.2 pp | 2,000 | 2.1 | |
| Palver | 18–20 Oct | 48 | 50 | 1 | ±2.4 pp | 5,000 | 2 | |
| Quaest | 17–20 Oct | 44 | 45 | 11 | ±2 pp | 2,154 | 1 | |
| Verita | 15–19 Oct | 48.2 | 49.7 | 2.1 | ±1 pp | 15,554 | 1.5 | |
| Ideia | 15–19 Oct | 46 | 48 | 6 | ±2.5 pp | 1,500 | 2 | |
| Alfa | 15–19 Oct | 45.9 | 48.8 | 5.3 | ±1.9 pp | 2,700 | 2.9 | |
| Real Time | 15–19 Oct | 45 | 48 | 7 | ±2 pp | 2,000 | 3 | |
| | 18 Oct | First presidential debate of the second round. | | | | | | |
| PoderData | 16–18 Oct | 46 | 49 | 5 | ±1.8 pp | 3,000 | 3 | |
| Nexus | 16–18 Oct | 45.9 | 46.5 | 7.6 | ±2 pp | 2,002 | 0.6 | |
| AtlasIntel | 13–18 Oct | 47.6 | 49.8 | 2.6 | ±1 pp | 4,998 | 2.2 | |
| Futura | 16–17 Oct | 47.5 | 48.3 | 4.3 | ±2.2 pp | 2,000 | 0.8 | |
| DataTrends | 15–17 Oct | 46 | 49 | 5 | ±2.19 pp | 2,000 | 3 | |
| Vox Brasil | 15–17 Oct | 46.4 | 44.6 | 8.9 | ±2.15 pp | 2,100 | 1.8 | |
| Gerp | 14–16 Oct | 45 | 50 | 5 | ±2 pp | 2,400 | 5 | |
| Verita | 12–16 Oct | 47.7 | 49.7 | 2.6 | ±1 pp | 15,554 | 2 | |
| Futura | 14–15 Oct | 47.5 | 49 | 3.6 | ±2.2 pp | 2,000 | 1.5 | |
| Ipespe | 13–15 Oct | 46 | 48 | 6 | ±2.6 pp | 1,500 | 2 | |
| MDA | 13–15 Oct | 45.9 | 46.8 | 7.3 | ±2.2 pp | 2,014 | 0.9 | |
| PoderData | 13–15 Oct | 47 | 47 | 6 | ±1.8 pp | 3,000 | Tie | |
| Datafolha | 13–15 Oct | 45 | 47 | 8 | ±2 pp | 2,520 | 2 | |
| Indexa | 13–14 Oct | 42 | 44 | 4 | ±2.2 pp | 2,000 | 2 | |
| Palver | 10–13 Oct | 49 | 50 | 1 | ±2.3 pp | 5,000 | 1 | |
| Quaest | 10–13 Oct | 44 | 46 | 10 | ±2 pp | 2,154 | 2 | |
| PoderData | 10–12 Oct | 46 | 48 | 7 | ±1.8 pp | 3,000 | 2 | |
| Nexus | 10–12 Oct | 45 | 48 | 7 | ±2 pp | 2,000 | 3 | |
| Gerp | 8–12 Oct | 44 | 53 | 3 | ±2 pp | 2,400 | 9 | |
| Futura | 7–10 Oct | 46.6 | 50 | 3.4 | ±2.2 pp | 2,000 | 3.4 | |
| | 9 Oct | Beginning of free electoral broadcast time on TV and Radio. (Note: In the second round, free advertisement on television and radio runs from 9 to 23 October 2026 and is reserved exclusively for the two remaining candidates. The block for presidential candidates airs Monday to Saturday, twice per day, for 10 minutes, divided equally between the candidates regardless of the size of their parties or coalitions, giving Lula and Flávio Bolsonaro 5 minutes each per block.) | | | | | | |
| Ipespe | 6–8 Oct | 44 | 49 | 7 | ±2.6 pp | 1,500 | 5 | |
| AtlasIntel | 3–8 Oct | 45.7 | 51.1 | 3.2 | ±1 pp | 5,026 | 5.4 | |
| Datafolha | 6–7 Oct | 45 | 49 | 6 | ±2 pp | 2,520 | 4 | |
| PoderData | 5–7 Oct | 44 | 49 | 7 | ±1.8 pp | 3,000 | 5 | |
| Vox Brasil | 5–7 Oct | 44.2 | 42.7 | 13.1 | ±2.15 pp | 2,100 | 1.5 | |
| | 4 Oct | First round of the elections. | | | | | | |

==== Aug–Oct (Campaign period) ====
| Pollster | Polling period | | | | | | | Blank Null Undec. | Margin of error | Sample size | Lead | Link |
| Pollster | Polling period | Lula PT | F. Bolsonaro PL | Caiado PSD | Zema Novo | Santos Mission | Cury Avante | Blank Null Undec. | Margin of error | Sample size | Lead | Link |
|---|---|---|---|---|---|---|---|---|---|---|---|---|
| Datafolha | 3 Oct | 47 | 46 | —N/a | —N/a | —N/a | —N/a | 8 | ±2 pp | 4,006 | 1 | |
| Quaest | 2–3 Oct | 42 | 44 | —N/a | —N/a | —N/a | —N/a | 14 | ±2 pp | 3,702 | 2 | |
| Futura | 2–3 Oct | 45.1 | 48 | —N/a | —N/a | —N/a | —N/a | 6.9 | ±2.2 pp | 2,000 | 2.9 | |
| Futura | 2–3 Oct | 44 | —N/a | 44.7 | —N/a | —N/a | —N/a | 11.3 | ±2.2 pp | 2,000 | 0.7 | |
| Palver | 30 Sep–3 Oct | 44 | 49 | —N/a | —N/a | —N/a | —N/a | 7 | ±2.4 pp | 5,000 | 5 | |
| Palver | 30 Sep–3 Oct | 43 | —N/a | 42 | —N/a | —N/a | —N/a | 14 | ±2.4 pp | 5,000 | 1 | |
| Palver | 30 Sep–3 Oct | 44 | —N/a | —N/a | 42 | —N/a | —N/a | 14 | ±2.4 pp | 5,000 | 2 | |
| Palver | 30 Sep–3 Oct | 44 | —N/a | —N/a | —N/a | 33 | —N/a | 23 | ±2.4 pp | 5,000 | 11 | |
| Palver | 30 Sep–3 Oct | 44 | —N/a | —N/a | —N/a | —N/a | 36 | 21 | ±2.4 pp | 5,000 | 8 | |
| PoderData | 30 Sep–2 Oct | 46 | 46 | —N/a | —N/a | —N/a | —N/a | 8 | ±1.5 pp | 4,000 | Tie | |
| MDA | 29 Sep–2 Oct | 47 | 43 | —N/a | —N/a | —N/a | —N/a | 10 | ±2.2 pp | 2,007 | 4 | |
| MDA | 29 Sep–2 Oct | 47 | —N/a | 37 | —N/a | —N/a | —N/a | 16 | ±2.2 pp | 2,007 | 10 | |
| MDA | 29 Sep–2 Oct | 49 | —N/a | —N/a | 34 | —N/a | —N/a | 16 | ±2.2 pp | 2,007 | 15 | |
| MDA | 29 Sep–2 Oct | 48 | —N/a | —N/a | —N/a | 34 | —N/a | 18 | ±2.2 pp | 2,007 | 14 | |
| MDA | 29 Sep–2 Oct | 47 | —N/a | —N/a | —N/a | —N/a | 38 | 15 | ±2.2 pp | 2,007 | 9 | |
| AtlasIntel | 27 Sep–2 Oct | 47.6 | 47.4 | —N/a | —N/a | —N/a | —N/a | 5 | ±1 pp | 4,945 | 0.2 | |
| Vox Brasil | 29 Sep–1 Oct | 45.2 | 48.2 | —N/a | —N/a | —N/a | —N/a | 6.6 | ±2.15 pp | 2,100 | 3 | |
| Vox Brasil | 29 Sep–1 Oct | 46.3 | —N/a | 42.1 | —N/a | —N/a | —N/a | 11.6 | ±2.15 pp | 2,100 | 4.2 | |
| Vox Brasil | 29 Sep–1 Oct | 46.8 | —N/a | —N/a | —N/a | —N/a | 33.1 | 20.1 | ±2.15 pp | 2,100 | 13.7 | |
| Datafolha | 28–30 Sep | 48 | 45 | —N/a | —N/a | —N/a | —N/a | 7 | ±2 pp | 2,506 | 3 | |
| Datafolha | 28–30 Sep | 48 | —N/a | 42 | —N/a | —N/a | —N/a | 10 | ±2 pp | 2,506 | 6 | |
| Datafolha | 28–30 Sep | 49 | —N/a | —N/a | 40 | —N/a | —N/a | 11 | ±2 pp | 2,506 | 9 | |
| Datafolha | 28–30 Sep | 48 | —N/a | —N/a | —N/a | 39 | —N/a | 12 | ±2 pp | 2,506 | 9 | |
| Datafolha | 28–30 Sep | 47 | —N/a | —N/a | —N/a | —N/a | 42 | 11 | ±2 pp | 2,506 | 5 | |
| Real Time | 26–30 Sep | 45 | 46 | —N/a | —N/a | —N/a | —N/a | 9 | ±2 pp | 2,000 | 1 | |
| Real Time | 26–30 Sep | 45 | —N/a | 43 | —N/a | —N/a | —N/a | 12 | ±2 pp | 2,000 | 2 | |
| Real Time | 26–30 Sep | 45 | —N/a | —N/a | 40 | —N/a | —N/a | 15 | ±2 pp | 2,000 | 5 | |
| Real Time | 26–30 Sep | 45 | —N/a | —N/a | —N/a | 38 | —N/a | 17 | ±2 pp | 2,000 | 7 | |
| Real Time | 26–30 Sep | 45 | —N/a | —N/a | —N/a | —N/a | 44 | 13 | ±2 pp | 2,000 | 1 | |
| Indexa | 27–29 Sep | 43 | 42 | —N/a | —N/a | —N/a | —N/a | 15 | ±2.2 pp | 2,000 | 1 | |
| Indexa | 27–29 Sep | 43 | —N/a | 40 | —N/a | —N/a | —N/a | 17 | ±2.2 pp | 2,000 | 3 | |
| Indexa | 27–29 Sep | 43 | —N/a | —N/a | 36 | —N/a | —N/a | 21 | ±2.2 pp | 2,000 | 7 | |
| Indexa | 27–29 Sep | 44 | —N/a | —N/a | —N/a | 38 | —N/a | 18 | ±2.2 pp | 2,000 | 6 | |
| Indexa | 27–29 Sep | 41 | —N/a | —N/a | —N/a | —N/a | 39 | 20 | ±2.2 pp | 2,000 | 2 | |
| Futura | 25–29 Sep | 43.5 | 49 | —N/a | —N/a | —N/a | —N/a | 7.5 | ±2.2 pp | 2,000 | 5.5 | |
| Futura | 25–29 Sep | 42.4 | —N/a | 45.6 | —N/a | —N/a | —N/a | 12 | ±2.2 pp | 2,000 | 3.2 | |
| Futura | 25–29 Sep | 45.1 | —N/a | —N/a | 42.2 | —N/a | —N/a | 12.8 | ±2.2 pp | 2,000 | 2.9 | |
| Futura | 25–29 Sep | 44.6 | —N/a | —N/a | —N/a | 40.7 | —N/a | 14.8 | ±2.2 pp | 2,000 | 3.9 | |
| Futura | 25–29 Sep | 42 | —N/a | —N/a | —N/a | —N/a | 45.1 | 12.8 | ±2.2 pp | 2,000 | 3.1 | |
| Vox Brasil | 26–28 Sep | 44.7 | 45.2 | —N/a | —N/a | —N/a | —N/a | 10.1 | ±2.15 pp | 2,100 | 0.5 | |
| Vox Brasil | 26–28 Sep | 45.3 | —N/a | 41.1 | —N/a | —N/a | —N/a | 13.6 | ±2.15 pp | 2,100 | 4.2 | |
| Vox Brasil | 26–28 Sep | 46.1 | —N/a | —N/a | 30.3 | —N/a | —N/a | 23.6 | ±2.15 pp | 2,100 | 15.8 | |
| Vox Brasil | 26–28 Sep | 44.8 | —N/a | —N/a | —N/a | —N/a | 35.1 | 20.1 | ±2.15 pp | 2,100 | 9.7 | |
| Ideia | 25–28 Sep | 48.5 | 48 | —N/a | —N/a | —N/a | —N/a | 3.6 | ±2.2 pp | 2,000 | 0.5 | |
| Ideia | 25–28 Sep | 48.5 | —N/a | 44.6 | —N/a | —N/a | —N/a | 7 | ±2.2 pp | 2,000 | 3.9 | |
| Ideia | 25–28 Sep | 48.5 | —N/a | —N/a | 44 | —N/a | —N/a | 7.6 | ±2.2 pp | 2,000 | 4.5 | |
| Ideia | 25–28 Sep | 48 | —N/a | —N/a | —N/a | 41.3 | —N/a | 10.8 | ±2.2 pp | 2,000 | 6.7 | |
| Ideia | 25–28 Sep | 48 | —N/a | —N/a | —N/a | —N/a | 44 | 8.1 | ±2.2 pp | 2,000 | 4 | |
| AtlasIntel | 23–28 Sep | 47.6 | 47.7 | —N/a | —N/a | —N/a | —N/a | 4.8 | ±1 pp | 5,005 | 0.1 | |
| AtlasIntel | 23–28 Sep | 45.9 | —N/a | 43.4 | —N/a | —N/a | —N/a | 10.8 | ±1 pp | 5,005 | 2.5 | |
| AtlasIntel | 23–28 Sep | 47.4 | —N/a | —N/a | 41.2 | —N/a | —N/a | 11.4 | ±1 pp | 5,005 | 6.2 | |
| AtlasIntel | 23–28 Sep | 46.4 | —N/a | —N/a | —N/a | 28.9 | —N/a | 24.7 | ±1 pp | 5,005 | 17.5 | |
| AtlasIntel | 23–28 Sep | 46.2 | —N/a | —N/a | —N/a | —N/a | 36.1 | 17.7 | ±1 pp | 5,005 | 10.1 | |
| Nexus | 25–27 Sep | 46 | 44 | —N/a | —N/a | —N/a | —N/a | 9 | ±2 pp | 2,000 | 2 | |
| Nexus | 25–27 Sep | 46 | —N/a | 42 | —N/a | —N/a | —N/a | 12 | ±2 pp | 2,000 | 4 | |
| Nexus | 25–27 Sep | 48 | —N/a | —N/a | 39 | —N/a | —N/a | 14 | ±2 pp | 2,000 | 9 | |
| Nexus | 25–27 Sep | 48 | —N/a | —N/a | —N/a | 37 | —N/a | 15 | ±2 pp | 2,000 | 11 | |
| Nexus | 25–27 Sep | 46 | —N/a | —N/a | —N/a | —N/a | 41 | 13 | ±2 pp | 2,000 | 5 | |
| Quaest | 24–27 Sep | 42 | 42 | —N/a | —N/a | —N/a | —N/a | 16 | ±2 pp | 2,004 | Tie | |
| Quaest | 24–27 Sep | 43 | —N/a | 40 | —N/a | —N/a | —N/a | 17 | ±2 pp | 2,004 | 3 | |
| Quaest | 24–27 Sep | 46 | —N/a | —N/a | 30 | —N/a | —N/a | 24 | ±2 pp | 2,004 | 16 | |
| Quaest | 24–27 Sep | 42 | —N/a | —N/a | —N/a | 39 | —N/a | 19 | ±2 pp | 2,004 | 3 | |
| Quaest | 24–27 Sep | 42 | —N/a | —N/a | —N/a | —N/a | 33 | 25 | ±2 pp | 2,004 | 9 | |
| Palver | 24–27 Sep | 45 | 47 | —N/a | —N/a | —N/a | —N/a | 8 | ±2.4 pp | 5,000 | 2 | |
| Palver | 24–27 Sep | 45 | —N/a | 40 | —N/a | —N/a | —N/a | 16 | ±2.4 pp | 5,000 | 5 | |
| Palver | 24–27 Sep | 45 | —N/a | —N/a | 40 | —N/a | —N/a | 14 | ±2.4 pp | 5,000 | 5 | |
| Palver | 24–27 Sep | 45 | —N/a | —N/a | —N/a | 33 | —N/a | 22 | ±2.4 pp | 5,000 | 12 | |
| Palver | 24–27 Sep | 44 | —N/a | —N/a | —N/a | —N/a | 34 | 22 | ±2.4 pp | 5,000 | 10 | |
| Datafolha | 22–24 Sep | 47 | 45 | —N/a | —N/a | —N/a | —N/a | 8 | ±2 pp | 2,002 | 2 | |
| Datafolha | 22–24 Sep | 46 | —N/a | 44 | —N/a | —N/a | —N/a | 10 | ±2 pp | 2,002 | 2 | |
| Datafolha | 22–24 Sep | 48 | —N/a | —N/a | 39 | —N/a | —N/a | 12 | ±2 pp | 2,002 | 9 | |
| Datafolha | 22–24 Sep | 48 | —N/a | —N/a | —N/a | 39 | —N/a | 14 | ±2 pp | 2,002 | 9 | |
| Datafolha | 22–24 Sep | 46 | —N/a | —N/a | —N/a | —N/a | 43 | 10 | ±2 pp | 2,002 | 3 | |
| Futura | 18–24 Sep | 43.7 | 49.4 | —N/a | —N/a | —N/a | —N/a | 6.9 | ±2.4 pp | 2,000 | 5.7 | |
| Futura | 18–24 Sep | 42.2 | —N/a | 46.5 | —N/a | —N/a | —N/a | 11 | ±2.4 pp | 2,000 | 4.3 | |
| Futura | 18–24 Sep | 43.3 | —N/a | —N/a | 43.8 | —N/a | —N/a | 12.9 | ±2.4 pp | 2,000 | 0.5 | |
| Futura | 18–24 Sep | 43.8 | —N/a | —N/a | —N/a | 41.7 | —N/a | 14.5 | ±2.4 pp | 2,000 | 2.1 | |
| Futura | 18–24 Sep | 41 | —N/a | —N/a | —N/a | —N/a | 46.3 | 12.7 | ±2.4 pp | 2,000 | 5.3 | |
| PoderData | 20–23 Sep | 45 | 46 | —N/a | —N/a | —N/a | —N/a | 9 | ±1.8 pp | 3,000 | 1 | |
| PoderData | 20–23 Sep | 42 | —N/a | —N/a | —N/a | —N/a | 45 | 13 | ±1.8 pp | 3,000 | 3 | |
| Palver | 20–23 Sep | 45 | 48 | —N/a | —N/a | —N/a | —N/a | 7 | ±3 pp | 5,000 | 3 | |
| Palver | 20–23 Sep | 44 | —N/a | 42 | —N/a | —N/a | —N/a | 14 | ±3 pp | 5,000 | 2 | |
| Palver | 20–23 Sep | 45 | —N/a | —N/a | 43 | —N/a | —N/a | 12 | ±3 pp | 5,000 | 2 | |
| Palver | 20–23 Sep | 44 | —N/a | —N/a | —N/a | 34 | —N/a | 22 | ±3 pp | 5,000 | 10 | |
| Palver | 20–23 Sep | 44 | —N/a | —N/a | —N/a | —N/a | 36 | 20 | ±3 pp | 5,000 | 8 | |
| Real Time | 19–23 Sep | 44 | 45 | —N/a | —N/a | —N/a | —N/a | 11 | ±2 pp | 2,000 | 1 | |
| Real Time | 19–23 Sep | 44 | —N/a | 44 | —N/a | —N/a | —N/a | 12 | ±2 pp | 2,000 | Tie | |
| Real Time | 19–23 Sep | 45 | —N/a | —N/a | 39 | —N/a | —N/a | 16 | ±2 pp | 2,000 | 6 | |
| Real Time | 19–23 Sep | 44 | —N/a | —N/a | —N/a | 38 | —N/a | 18 | ±2 pp | 2,000 | 6 | |
| Real Time | 19–23 Sep | 44 | —N/a | —N/a | —N/a | —N/a | 43 | 13 | ±2 pp | 2,000 | 1 | |
| AtlasIntel | 17–22 Sep | 47.7 | 47.4 | —N/a | —N/a | —N/a | —N/a | 4.9 | ±1 pp | 5,015 | 0.3 | |
| AtlasIntel | 17–22 Sep | 46.6 | —N/a | 44 | —N/a | —N/a | —N/a | 9.4 | ±1 pp | 5,015 | 2.6 | |
| AtlasIntel | 17–22 Sep | 47.6 | —N/a | —N/a | 42.2 | —N/a | —N/a | 10.2 | ±1 pp | 5,015 | 5.4 | |
| AtlasIntel | 17–22 Sep | 46.5 | —N/a | —N/a | —N/a | 31.2 | —N/a | 22.3 | ±1 pp | 5,015 | 15.3 | |
| AtlasIntel | 17–22 Sep | 46.2 | —N/a | —N/a | —N/a | —N/a | 39.4 | 14.4 | ±1 pp | 5,015 | 6.8 | |
| Nexus | 18–20 Sep | 46 | 45 | —N/a | —N/a | —N/a | —N/a | 8 | ±2 pp | 2,006 | 1 | |
| Nexus | 18–20 Sep | 45 | —N/a | 45 | —N/a | —N/a | —N/a | 10 | ±2 pp | 2,006 | Tie | |
| Nexus | 18–20 Sep | 47 | —N/a | —N/a | 41 | —N/a | —N/a | 12 | ±2 pp | 2,006 | 6 | |
| Nexus | 18–20 Sep | 47 | —N/a | —N/a | —N/a | 39 | —N/a | 15 | ±2 pp | 2,006 | 8 | |
| Nexus | 18–20 Sep | 44 | —N/a | —N/a | —N/a | —N/a | 43 | 13 | ±2 pp | 2,006 | 1 | |
| Quaest | 17–20 Sep | 41 | 42 | —N/a | —N/a | —N/a | —N/a | 17 | ±2 pp | 2,004 | 1 | |
| Quaest | 17–20 Sep | 41 | —N/a | 39 | —N/a | —N/a | —N/a | 20 | ±2 pp | 2,004 | 2 | |
| Quaest | 17–20 Sep | 46 | —N/a | —N/a | 32 | —N/a | —N/a | 22 | ±2 pp | 2,004 | 14 | |
| Quaest | 17–20 Sep | 41 | —N/a | —N/a | —N/a | 38 | —N/a | 21 | ±2 pp | 2,004 | 3 | |
| Quaest | 17–20 Sep | 39 | —N/a | —N/a | —N/a | —N/a | 35 | 26 | ±2 pp | 2,004 | 4 | |
| Palver | 15–20 Sep | 43 | 47 | —N/a | —N/a | —N/a | —N/a | 10 | ±3 pp | 5,000 | 4 | |
| Palver | 15–20 Sep | 43 | —N/a | 44 | —N/a | —N/a | —N/a | 13 | ±3 pp | 5,000 | 1 | |
| Palver | 15–20 Sep | 43 | —N/a | —N/a | 44 | —N/a | —N/a | 12 | ±3 pp | 5,000 | 1 | |
| Palver | 15–20 Sep | 43 | —N/a | —N/a | —N/a | 34 | —N/a | 23 | ±3 pp | 5,000 | 9 | |
| Palver | 15–20 Sep | 43 | —N/a | —N/a | —N/a | —N/a | 35 | 22 | ±3 pp | 5,000 | 8 | |
| Datafolha | 15–16 Sep | 46 | 44 | —N/a | —N/a | —N/a | —N/a | 9 | ±2 pp | 2,002 | 2 | |
| Datafolha | 15–16 Sep | 46 | —N/a | 42 | —N/a | —N/a | —N/a | 12 | ±2 pp | 2,002 | 4 | |
| Datafolha | 15–16 Sep | 48 | —N/a | —N/a | 39 | —N/a | —N/a | 13 | ±2 pp | 2,002 | 9 | |
| Datafolha | 15–16 Sep | 47 | —N/a | —N/a | —N/a | 38 | —N/a | 15 | ±2 pp | 2,002 | 9 | |
| Datafolha | 15–16 Sep | 44 | —N/a | —N/a | —N/a | —N/a | 44 | 11 | ±2 pp | 2,002 | Tie | |
| PoderData | 13–16 Sep | 44 | 46 | —N/a | —N/a | —N/a | —N/a | 10 | ±1.8 pp | 3,000 | 2 | |
| PoderData | 13–16 Sep | 42 | —N/a | —N/a | —N/a | —N/a | 45 | 13 | ±1.8 pp | 3,000 | 3 | |
| AtlasIntel | 11–16 Sep | 46.8 | 47.2 | —N/a | —N/a | —N/a | —N/a | 6 | ±1 pp | 5,018 | 0.4 | |
| AtlasIntel | 11–16 Sep | 46 | —N/a | 41.7 | —N/a | —N/a | —N/a | 12.3 | ±1 pp | 5,018 | 4.3 | |
| AtlasIntel | 11–16 Sep | 46.3 | —N/a | —N/a | 43.7 | —N/a | —N/a | 10.1 | ±1 pp | 5,018 | 2.6 | |
| AtlasIntel | 11–16 Sep | 46.1 | —N/a | —N/a | —N/a | 29.7 | —N/a | 24.2 | ±1 pp | 5,018 | 16.4 | |
| AtlasIntel | 11–16 Sep | 45.6 | —N/a | —N/a | —N/a | —N/a | 37.8 | 16.6 | ±1 pp | 5,018 | 7.8 | |
| Futura | 11–15 Sep | 43.7 | 48.1 | —N/a | —N/a | —N/a | —N/a | 8.2 | ±2.2 pp | 2,000 | 4.4 | |
| Futura | 11–15 Sep | 41.9 | —N/a | 45.1 | —N/a | —N/a | —N/a | 13 | ±2.2 pp | 2,000 | 3.2 | |
| Futura | 11–15 Sep | 44.7 | —N/a | —N/a | 40.6 | —N/a | —N/a | 14.7 | ±2.2 pp | 2,000 | 4.1 | |
| Futura | 11–15 Sep | 44.5 | —N/a | —N/a | —N/a | 39.3 | —N/a | 16.2 | ±2.2 pp | 2,000 | 5.2 | |
| Futura | 11–15 Sep | 41.5 | —N/a | —N/a | —N/a | —N/a | 44.8 | 13.8 | ±2.2 pp | 2,000 | 3.3 | |
| Nexus | 11–13 Sep | 47 | 46 | —N/a | —N/a | —N/a | —N/a | 7 | ±2 pp | 2,003 | 1 | |
| Nexus | 11–13 Sep | 47 | —N/a | 41 | —N/a | —N/a | —N/a | 12 | ±2 pp | 2,003 | 6 | |
| Nexus | 11–13 Sep | 49 | —N/a | —N/a | 38 | —N/a | —N/a | 12 | ±2 pp | 2,003 | 11 | |
| Nexus | 11–13 Sep | 48 | —N/a | —N/a | —N/a | 37 | —N/a | 15 | ±2 pp | 2,003 | 11 | |
| Nexus | 11–13 Sep | 45 | —N/a | —N/a | —N/a | —N/a | 42 | 11 | ±2 pp | 2,003 | 3 | |
| Quaest | 10–13 Sep | 40 | 42 | —N/a | —N/a | —N/a | —N/a | 18 | ±2 pp | 2,004 | 2 | |
| Quaest | 10–13 Sep | 41 | —N/a | 39 | —N/a | —N/a | —N/a | 20 | ±2 pp | 2,004 | 2 | |
| Quaest | 10–13 Sep | 45 | —N/a | —N/a | 33 | —N/a | —N/a | 22 | ±2 pp | 2,004 | 12 | |
| Quaest | 10–13 Sep | 41 | —N/a | —N/a | —N/a | 38 | —N/a | 21 | ±2 pp | 2,004 | 3 | |
| Quaest | 10–13 Sep | 38 | —N/a | —N/a | —N/a | —N/a | 36 | 26 | ±2 pp | 2,004 | 2 | |
| Indexa | 10–13 Sep | 43 | 42 | —N/a | —N/a | —N/a | —N/a | 15 | ±2.2 pp | 2,000 | 1 | |
| Indexa | 10–13 Sep | 43 | —N/a | 39 | —N/a | —N/a | —N/a | 18 | ±2.2 pp | 2,000 | 4 | |
| Indexa | 10–13 Sep | 45 | —N/a | —N/a | 34 | —N/a | —N/a | 21 | ±2.2 pp | 2,000 | 11 | |
| Indexa | 10–13 Sep | 45 | —N/a | —N/a | —N/a | 35 | —N/a | 20 | ±2.2 pp | 2,000 | 10 | |
| Indexa | 10–13 Sep | 41 | —N/a | —N/a | —N/a | —N/a | 39 | 20 | ±2.2 pp | 2,000 | 2 | |
| MDA | 9–13 Sep | 47.3 | 40 | —N/a | —N/a | —N/a | —N/a | 12.7 | ±2.2 pp | 2,002 | 7.3 | |
| MDA | 9–13 Sep | 46.4 | —N/a | 37.3 | —N/a | —N/a | —N/a | 15.3 | ±2.2 pp | 2,002 | 9.1 | |
| MDA | 9–13 Sep | 47.7 | —N/a | —N/a | 34.5 | —N/a | —N/a | 17.8 | ±2.2 pp | 2,002 | 13.2 | |
| MDA | 9–13 Sep | 47.3 | —N/a | —N/a | —N/a | 33.9 | —N/a | 18.8 | ±2.2 pp | 2,002 | 13.4 | |
| MDA | 9–13 Sep | 45.3 | —N/a | —N/a | —N/a | —N/a | 38.4 | 16.3 | ±2.2 pp | 2,002 | 7.1 | |
| Datafolha | 8–10 Sep | 46 | 44 | —N/a | —N/a | —N/a | —N/a | 9 | ±2 pp | 2,002 | 2 | |
| Datafolha | 8–10 Sep | 46 | —N/a | 41 | —N/a | —N/a | —N/a | 12 | ±2 pp | 2,002 | 5 | |
| Datafolha | 8–10 Sep | 48 | —N/a | —N/a | 39 | —N/a | —N/a | 13 | ±2 pp | 2,002 | 9 | |
| Datafolha | 8–10 Sep | 48 | —N/a | —N/a | —N/a | 37 | —N/a | 14 | ±2 pp | 2,002 | 11 | |
| Datafolha | 8–10 Sep | 45 | —N/a | —N/a | —N/a | —N/a | 43 | 12 | ±2 pp | 2,002 | 2 | |
| Futura | 4–10 Sep | 45 | 45.4 | —N/a | —N/a | —N/a | —N/a | 9.6 | ±2.2 pp | 2,000 | 0.4 | |
| Futura | 4–10 Sep | 43.7 | —N/a | 42.8 | —N/a | —N/a | —N/a | 13.6 | ±2.2 pp | 2,000 | 0.9 | |
| Futura | 4–10 Sep | 46 | —N/a | —N/a | 40.5 | —N/a | —N/a | 13.5 | ±2.2 pp | 2,000 | 5.5 | |
| Futura | 4–10 Sep | 46.1 | —N/a | —N/a | —N/a | 37.6 | —N/a | 16.3 | ±2.2 pp | 2,000 | 8.5 | |
| PoderData | 6–9 Sep | 45 | 47 | —N/a | —N/a | —N/a | —N/a | 8 | ±1.8 pp | 3,000 | 2 | |
| PoderData | 6–9 Sep | 43 | —N/a | —N/a | —N/a | —N/a | 44 | 13 | ±1.8 pp | 3,000 | 1 | |
| AtlasIntel | 4–9 Sep | 46.2 | 46.4 | —N/a | —N/a | —N/a | —N/a | 7.4 | ±1 pp | 5,000 | 0.2 | |
| AtlasIntel | 4–9 Sep | 45.7 | —N/a | 45.7 | —N/a | —N/a | —N/a | 8.6 | ±1 pp | 5,000 | Tie | |
| AtlasIntel | 4–9 Sep | 46 | —N/a | —N/a | 46.2 | —N/a | —N/a | 7.7 | ±1 pp | 5,000 | 0.2 | |
| AtlasIntel | 4–9 Sep | 46 | —N/a | —N/a | —N/a | 33.8 | —N/a | 20.2 | ±1 pp | 5,000 | 12.2 | |
| AtlasIntel | 4–9 Sep | 43.8 | —N/a | —N/a | —N/a | —N/a | 41.1 | 15.2 | ±1 pp | 5,000 | 2.7 | |
| Palver | 4–7 Sep | 44 | 46 | —N/a | —N/a | —N/a | —N/a | 10 | ±3 pp | 5,000 | 2 | |
| Palver | 4–7 Sep | 43 | —N/a | 40 | —N/a | —N/a | —N/a | 18 | ±3 pp | 5,000 | 3 | |
| Palver | 4–7 Sep | 43 | —N/a | —N/a | 42 | —N/a | —N/a | 15 | ±3 pp | 5,000 | 1 | |
| Palver | 4–7 Sep | 43 | —N/a | —N/a | —N/a | 31 | —N/a | 26 | ±3 pp | 5,000 | 12 | |
| Palver | 4–7 Sep | 42 | —N/a | —N/a | —N/a | —N/a | 30 | 27 | ±3 pp | 5,000 | 12 | |
| Ideia | 4–7 Sep | 46 | 46 | —N/a | —N/a | —N/a | —N/a | 8 | ±2.5 pp | 1,500 | Tie | |
| Ideia | 4–7 Sep | 46 | —N/a | 42 | —N/a | —N/a | —N/a | 12 | ±2.5 pp | 1,500 | 4 | |
| Ideia | 4–7 Sep | 46 | —N/a | —N/a | 38 | —N/a | —N/a | 16 | ±2.5 pp | 1,500 | 8 | |
| Ideia | 4–7 Sep | 46 | —N/a | —N/a | —N/a | 40.3 | —N/a | 13.8 | ±2.5 pp | 1,500 | 5.7 | |
| Ideia | 4–7 Sep | 46 | —N/a | —N/a | —N/a | —N/a | 40.9 | 13.1 | ±2.5 pp | 1,500 | 5.1 | |
| Nexus | 4–7 Sep | 45 | 46 | —N/a | —N/a | —N/a | —N/a | 9 | ±2 pp | 2,002 | 1 | |
| Nexus | 4–7 Sep | 46 | —N/a | 43 | —N/a | —N/a | —N/a | 11 | ±2 pp | 2,002 | 3 | |
| Nexus | 4–7 Sep | 47 | —N/a | —N/a | 40 | —N/a | —N/a | 13 | ±2 pp | 2,002 | 7 | |
| Nexus | 4–7 Sep | 47 | —N/a | —N/a | —N/a | 39 | —N/a | 14 | ±2 pp | 2,002 | 8 | |
| Nexus | 4–7 Sep | 43 | —N/a | —N/a | —N/a | —N/a | 45 | 11 | ±2 pp | 2,002 | 2 | |
| Quaest | 3–6 Sep | 41 | 41 | —N/a | —N/a | —N/a | —N/a | 18 | ±2 pp | 2,004 | Tie | |
| Quaest | 3–6 Sep | 41 | —N/a | 38 | —N/a | —N/a | —N/a | 21 | ±2 pp | 2,004 | 3 | |
| Quaest | 3–6 Sep | 44 | —N/a | —N/a | 33 | —N/a | —N/a | 23 | ±2 pp | 2,004 | 11 | |
| Quaest | 3–6 Sep | 42 | —N/a | —N/a | —N/a | 37 | —N/a | 21 | ±2 pp | 2,004 | 5 | |
| Quaest | 3–6 Sep | 39 | —N/a | —N/a | —N/a | —N/a | 35 | 26 | ±2 pp | 2,004 | 4 | |
| Datafolha | 1–2 Sep | 46 | 44 | —N/a | —N/a | —N/a | —N/a | 11 | ±2 pp | 2,002 | 2 | |
| Datafolha | 1–2 Sep | 46 | —N/a | 41 | —N/a | —N/a | —N/a | 13 | ±2 pp | 2,002 | 5 | |
| Datafolha | 1–2 Sep | 48 | —N/a | —N/a | 39 | —N/a | —N/a | 14 | ±2 pp | 2,002 | 9 | |
| Datafolha | 1–2 Sep | 47 | —N/a | —N/a | —N/a | 38 | —N/a | 15 | ±2 pp | 2,002 | 9 | |
| PoderData | 30 Aug – 2 Sep | 44 | 45 | —N/a | —N/a | —N/a | —N/a | 11 | ±1.8 pp | 3,000 | 1 | |
| PoderData | 30 Aug – 2 Sep | 42 | —N/a | 44 | —N/a | —N/a | —N/a | 13 | ±1.8 pp | 3,000 | 2 | |
| PoderData | 30 Aug – 2 Sep | 44 | —N/a | —N/a | 42 | —N/a | —N/a | 14 | ±1.8 pp | 3,000 | 2 | |
| PoderData | 30 Aug – 2 Sep | 44 | —N/a | —N/a | —N/a | 39 | —N/a | 18 | ±1.8 pp | 3,000 | 5 | |
| | 1 Sep | Beginning of the institutional crisis at the Supreme Federal Court. | | | | | | | | | | |
| Quaest | 30 Aug – 1 Sep | 42 | 41 | —N/a | —N/a | —N/a | —N/a | 17 | ±2 pp | 2,005 | 1 | |
| Quaest | 30 Aug – 1 Sep | 42 | —N/a | 37 | —N/a | —N/a | —N/a | 21 | ±2 pp | 2,005 | 1 | |
| Quaest | 30 Aug – 1 Sep | 44 | —N/a | —N/a | 33 | —N/a | —N/a | 23 | ±2 pp | 2,005 | 11 | |
| Quaest | 30 Aug – 1 Sep | 43 | —N/a | —N/a | —N/a | 36 | —N/a | 21 | ±2 pp | 2,005 | 7 | |
| Quaest | 30 Aug – 1 Sep | 40 | —N/a | —N/a | —N/a | —N/a | 34 | 26 | ±2 pp | 2,005 | 6 | |
| Futura | 27 Aug – 1 Sep | 45.6 | 45.2 | —N/a | —N/a | —N/a | —N/a | 9.2 | ±2.2 pp | 2,000 | 0.4 | |
| Futura | 27 Aug – 1 Sep | 44.4 | —N/a | 42.5 | —N/a | —N/a | —N/a | 13.1 | ±2.2 pp | 2,000 | 1.9 | |
| Futura | 27 Aug – 1 Sep | 46.7 | —N/a | —N/a | 38.5 | —N/a | —N/a | 14.9 | ±2.2 pp | 2,000 | 8.2 | |
| Futura | 27 Aug – 1 Sep | 46.6 | —N/a | —N/a | —N/a | 36.6 | —N/a | 16.8 | ±2.2 pp | 2,000 | 10 | |
| Real Time | 27–31 Aug | 44 | 44 | —N/a | —N/a | —N/a | —N/a | 12 | ±2 pp | 2,000 | Tie | |
| Real Time | 27–31 Aug | 43 | —N/a | 45 | —N/a | —N/a | —N/a | 12 | ±2 pp | 2,000 | 2 | |
| Real Time | 27–31 Aug | 43 | —N/a | —N/a | 40 | —N/a | —N/a | 17 | ±2 pp | 2,000 | 3 | |
| Real Time | 27–31 Aug | 44 | —N/a | —N/a | —N/a | 37 | —N/a | 19 | ±2 pp | 2,000 | 7 | |
| Nexus | 28–30 Aug | 46 | 45 | —N/a | —N/a | —N/a | —N/a | 9 | ±2 pp | 2,005 | 1 | |
| Nexus | 28–30 Aug | 45 | —N/a | 44 | —N/a | —N/a | —N/a | 11 | ±2 pp | 2,005 | 1 | |
| Nexus | 28–30 Aug | 46 | —N/a | —N/a | 41 | —N/a | —N/a | 13 | ±2 pp | 2,005 | 5 | |
| Nexus | 28–30 Aug | 47 | —N/a | —N/a | —N/a | 38 | —N/a | 15 | ±2 pp | 2,005 | 9 | |
| AtlasIntel | 25–30 Aug | 47.1 | 42.6 | —N/a | —N/a | —N/a | —N/a | 10.3 | ±1.0 pp | 5,014 | 4.5 | |
| AtlasIntel | 25–30 Aug | 46.6 | —N/a | 41.0 | —N/a | —N/a | —N/a | 12.3 | ±1.0 pp | 5,014 | 5.6 | |
| AtlasIntel | 25–30 Aug | 47.0 | —N/a | —N/a | 40.7 | —N/a | —N/a | 12.3 | ±1.0 pp | 5,014 | 6.3 | |
| AtlasIntel | 25–30 Aug | 47.5 | —N/a | —N/a | —N/a | 26.0 | —N/a | 26.6 | ±1.0 pp | 5,014 | 21.5 | |
| Vox Brasil | 25–27 Aug | 44.5 | 45.1 | —N/a | —N/a | —N/a | —N/a | 10.4 | ±2.15 pp | 2,100 | 0.6 | |
| Vox Brasil | 25–27 Aug | 45.5 | —N/a | 41.1 | —N/a | —N/a | —N/a | 13.4 | ±2.15 pp | 2,100 | 4.4 | |
| Vox Brasil | 25–27 Aug | 45.5 | —N/a | —N/a | 39.3 | —N/a | —N/a | 15.2 | ±2.15 pp | 2,100 | 6.2 | |
| PoderData | 23–26 Aug | 45 | 44 | —N/a | —N/a | —N/a | —N/a | 11 | ±2 pp | 2,400 | 1 | |
| PoderData | 23–26 Aug | 43 | —N/a | 44 | —N/a | —N/a | —N/a | 12 | ±2 pp | 2,400 | 1 | |
| PoderData | 23–26 Aug | 44 | —N/a | —N/a | 43 | —N/a | —N/a | 12 | ±2 pp | 2,400 | 1 | |
| PoderData | 23–26 Aug | 44 | —N/a | —N/a | —N/a | 37 | —N/a | 19 | ±2 pp | 2,400 | 7 | |
| Nexus | 21–23 Aug | 46 | 45 | —N/a | —N/a | —N/a | —N/a | 9 | ±2 pp | 2,006 | 1 | |
| Nexus | 21–23 Aug | 46 | —N/a | 42 | —N/a | —N/a | —N/a | 13 | ±2 pp | 2,006 | 4 | |
| Nexus | 21–23 Aug | 47 | —N/a | —N/a | 40 | —N/a | —N/a | 13 | ±2 pp | 2,006 | 7 | |
| Nexus | 21–23 Aug | 47 | —N/a | —N/a | —N/a | 35 | —N/a | 17 | ±2 pp | 2,006 | 12 | |
| Indexa | 20–23 Aug | 46 | 41 | —N/a | —N/a | —N/a | —N/a | 13 | ±2.2 pp | 2,000 | 5 | |
| Indexa | 20–23 Aug | 44 | —N/a | 38 | —N/a | —N/a | —N/a | 18 | ±2.2 pp | 2,000 | 6 | |
| Indexa | 20–23 Aug | 45 | —N/a | —N/a | 34 | —N/a | —N/a | 21 | ±2.2 pp | 2,000 | 11 | |
| Indexa | 20–23 Aug | 46 | —N/a | —N/a | —N/a | 34 | —N/a | 20 | ±2.2 pp | 2,000 | 12 | |
| Datafolha | 18–20 Aug | 47 | 43 | —N/a | —N/a | —N/a | —N/a | 11 | ±2 pp | 2,058 | 4 | |
| Datafolha | 18–20 Aug | 47 | —N/a | 40 | —N/a | —N/a | —N/a | 14 | ±2 pp | 2,058 | 7 | |
| Datafolha | 18–20 Aug | 48 | —N/a | —N/a | 38 | —N/a | —N/a | 14 | ±2 pp | 2,058 | 10 | |
| Datafolha | 18–20 Aug | 47 | —N/a | —N/a | —N/a | 37 | —N/a | 16 | ±2 pp | 2,058 | 10 | |
| Nexus | 14–16 Aug | 47 | 44 | —N/a | —N/a | —N/a | —N/a | 9 | ±2 pp | 2,003 | 3 | |
| Nexus | 14–16 Aug | 45 | —N/a | 42 | —N/a | —N/a | —N/a | 13 | ±2 pp | 2,003 | 3 | |
| Nexus | 14–16 Aug | 46 | —N/a | —N/a | 41 | —N/a | —N/a | 13 | ±2 pp | 2,003 | 5 | |
| Nexus | 14–16 Aug | 47 | —N/a | —N/a | —N/a | 36 | —N/a | 17 | ±2 pp | 2,003 | 11 | |
| | 16 Aug | Beginning of the election campaign. | | | | | | | | | | |
| | 15 Aug | Deadline for the registration of candidacies. | | | | | | | | | | |

==== Apr–Aug ====
| Pollster firm | Polling period | | | | | | | Blank Null Undec. | Margin of error | Sample size | Lead | Link |
| Pollster firm | Polling period | Lula PT | F. Bolsonaro PL | Caiado PSD | Zema Novo | Santos Mission | Cury Avante | Blank Null Undec. | Margin of error | Sample size | Lead | Link |
|---|---|---|---|---|---|---|---|---|---|---|---|---|
| Quaest | 10–13 Aug | 43 | 40 | —N/a | —N/a | —N/a | —N/a | 17 | ±2 pp | 2,004 | 3 | |
| Quaest | 10–13 Aug | 44 | —N/a | 37 | —N/a | —N/a | —N/a | 19 | ±2 pp | 2,004 | 7 | |
| Quaest | 10–13 Aug | 45 | —N/a | —N/a | 34 | —N/a | —N/a | 21 | ±2 pp | 2,004 | 11 | |
| Quaest | 10–13 Aug | 44 | —N/a | —N/a | —N/a | 36 | —N/a | 20 | ±2 pp | 2,004 | 8 | |
| PoderData | 9–12 Aug | 46 | 45 | —N/a | —N/a | —N/a | —N/a | 9 | ±2 pp | 2,400 | 1 | |
| PoderData | 9–12 Aug | 45 | —N/a | 44 | —N/a | —N/a | —N/a | 11 | ±2 pp | 2,400 | 1 | |
| PoderData | 9–12 Aug | 45 | —N/a | —N/a | 43 | —N/a | —N/a | 11 | ±2 pp | 2,400 | 2 | |
| PoderData | 9–12 Aug | 46 | —N/a | —N/a | —N/a | 37 | —N/a | 17 | ±2 pp | 2,400 | 9 | |
| Nexus | 7–9 Aug | 47 | 44 | —N/a | —N/a | —N/a | —N/a | 9 | ±2 pp | 2,001 | 3 | |
| Nexus | 7–9 Aug | 46 | —N/a | 42 | —N/a | —N/a | —N/a | 11 | ±2 pp | 2,001 | 4 | |
| Nexus | 7–9 Aug | 47 | —N/a | —N/a | 40 | —N/a | —N/a | 13 | ±2 pp | 2,001 | 7 | |
| Nexus | 7–9 Aug | 46 | —N/a | —N/a | —N/a | 37 | —N/a | 17 | ±2 pp | 2,001 | 9 | |
| MDA | 5–9 Aug | 48 | 39.1 | —N/a | —N/a | —N/a | —N/a | 12.9 | ±2.2 pp | 2,002 | 8.9 | |
| MDA | 5–9 Aug | 47.9 | —N/a | 35.9 | —N/a | —N/a | —N/a | 16.2 | ±2.2 pp | 2,002 | 12 | |
| MDA | 5–9 Aug | 49.1 | —N/a | —N/a | 34.9 | —N/a | —N/a | 16 | ±2.2 pp | 2,002 | 14.2 | |
| MDA | 5–9 Aug | 48.5 | —N/a | —N/a | —N/a | 33 | —N/a | 18.5 | ±2.2 pp | 2,002 | 15.5 | |
| MDA | 5–9 Aug | 48.6 | —N/a | —N/a | —N/a | —N/a | 32.4 | 19 | ±2.2 pp | 2,002 | 16.2 | |
| Futura | 3–7 Aug | 46.5 | 44 | —N/a | —N/a | —N/a | —N/a | 9.5 | ±2.2 pp | 2,000 | 2.5 | |
| Futura | 3–7 Aug | 45.3 | —N/a | 39.2 | —N/a | —N/a | —N/a | 15.4 | ±2.2 pp | 2,000 | 6.1 | |
| Futura | 3–7 Aug | 46.5 | —N/a | —N/a | 39.8 | —N/a | —N/a | 13.6 | ±2.2 pp | 2,000 | 6.7 | |
| Futura | 3–7 Aug | 47.3 | —N/a | —N/a | —N/a | 33.3 | —N/a | 19.4 | ±2.2 pp | 2,000 | 14 | |
| Palver | 3–7 Aug | 46 | 46 | —N/a | —N/a | —N/a | —N/a | 8 | ±3 pp | 5,000 | Tie | |
| Palver | 3–7 Aug | 45 | —N/a | 38 | —N/a | —N/a | —N/a | 16 | ±3 pp | 5,000 | 7 | |
| Palver | 3–7 Aug | 46 | —N/a | —N/a | 39 | —N/a | —N/a | 15 | ±3 pp | 5,000 | 7 | |
| Palver | 3–7 Aug | 46 | —N/a | —N/a | —N/a | 31 | —N/a | 25 | ±3 pp | 5,000 | 15 | |
| Quaest | 31 Jul – 3 Aug | 44 | 39 | —N/a | —N/a | —N/a | —N/a | 17 | ±2 pp | 2,004 | 5 | |
| Quaest | 31 Jul – 3 Aug | 45 | —N/a | 37 | —N/a | —N/a | —N/a | 18 | ±2 pp | 2,004 | 8 | |
| Quaest | 31 Jul – 3 Aug | 46 | —N/a | —N/a | 34 | —N/a | —N/a | 20 | ±2 pp | 2,004 | 12 | |
| Quaest | 31 Jul – 3 Aug | 45 | —N/a | —N/a | —N/a | 35 | —N/a | 20 | ±2 pp | 2,004 | 10 | |
| Ideia | 31 Jul – 3 Aug | 48.5 | 43 | —N/a | —N/a | —N/a | —N/a | 8.5 | ±2.5 pp | 1,500 | 5.5 | |
| Ideia | 31 Jul – 3 Aug | 48.5 | —N/a | 40 | —N/a | —N/a | —N/a | 11.5 | ±2.5 pp | 1,500 | 8.5 | |
| Ideia | 31 Jul – 3 Aug | 48.5 | —N/a | —N/a | 37 | —N/a | —N/a | 14.5 | ±2.5 pp | 1,500 | 11.5 | |
| Ideia | 31 Jul – 3 Aug | 48 | —N/a | —N/a | —N/a | 34.7 | —N/a | 17.2 | ±2.5 pp | 1,500 | 13.3 | |
| Nexus | 31 Jul – 2 Aug | 46 | 45 | —N/a | —N/a | —N/a | —N/a | 10 | ±2 pp | 2,002 | 1 | |
| Nexus | 31 Jul – 2 Aug | 46 | —N/a | 42 | —N/a | —N/a | —N/a | 13 | ±2 pp | 2,002 | 4 | |
| Nexus | 31 Jul – 2 Aug | 46 | —N/a | —N/a | 40 | —N/a | —N/a | 13 | ±2 pp | 2,002 | 6 | |
| Nexus | 31 Jul – 2 Aug | 47 | —N/a | —N/a | —N/a | 37 | —N/a | 16 | ±2 pp | 2,002 | 10 | |
| PoderData | 26–29 Jul | 46 | 43 | —N/a | —N/a | —N/a | —N/a | 11 | ±2 pp | 2,400 | 3 | |
| PoderData | 26–29 Jul | 44 | —N/a | 43 | —N/a | —N/a | —N/a | 13 | ±2 pp | 2,400 | 1 | |
| PoderData | 26–29 Jul | 44 | —N/a | —N/a | 42 | —N/a | —N/a | 13 | ±2 pp | 2,400 | 2 | |
| PoderData | 26–29 Jul | 45 | —N/a | —N/a | —N/a | 37 | —N/a | 19 | ±2 pp | 2,400 | 8 | |
| Vox Brasil | 26–28 Jul | 47.5 | 41.1 | —N/a | —N/a | —N/a | —N/a | 11.4 | ±2.15 pp | 2,100 | 6.4 | |
| Vox Brasil | 26–28 Jul | 46.8 | —N/a | 42.5 | —N/a | —N/a | —N/a | 10.7 | ±2.15 pp | 2,100 | 4.3 | |
| Vox Brasil | 26–28 Jul | 48.7 | —N/a | —N/a | 40.5 | —N/a | —N/a | 10.8 | ±2.15 pp | 2,100 | 8.2 | |
| AtlasIntel | 22–27 Jul | 49.2 | 42.9 | —N/a | —N/a | —N/a | —N/a | 7.9 | ±1 pp | 5,021 | 6.3 | |
| AtlasIntel | 22–27 Jul | 48.2 | —N/a | 38.9 | —N/a | —N/a | —N/a | 12.9 | ±1 pp | 5,021 | 9.3 | |
| AtlasIntel | 22–27 Jul | 48.6 | —N/a | —N/a | 39.6 | —N/a | —N/a | 11.8 | ±1 pp | 5,021 | 9 | |
| AtlasIntel | 22–27 Jul | 47.6 | —N/a | —N/a | —N/a | 30.2 | —N/a | 22.2 | ±1 pp | 5,021 | 17.4 | |
| Nexus | 24–26 Jul | 47 | 43 | —N/a | —N/a | —N/a | —N/a | 10 | ±2 pp | 2,004 | 4 | |
| Nexus | 24–26 Jul | 45 | —N/a | 43 | —N/a | —N/a | —N/a | 12 | ±2 pp | 2,004 | 2 | |
| Nexus | 24–26 Jul | 46 | —N/a | —N/a | 42 | —N/a | —N/a | 12 | ±2 pp | 2,004 | 4 | |
| Nexus | 24–26 Jul | 47 | —N/a | —N/a | —N/a | 39 | —N/a | 15 | ±2 pp | 2,004 | 8 | |
| Datafolha | 22–23 Jul | 48 | 43 | —N/a | —N/a | —N/a | —N/a | 10 | ±2 pp | 2,004 | 5 | |
| Datafolha | 22–23 Jul | 47 | —N/a | 40 | —N/a | —N/a | —N/a | 13 | ±2 pp | 2,004 | 7 | |
| Datafolha | 22–23 Jul | 48 | —N/a | —N/a | 40 | —N/a | —N/a | 12 | ±2 pp | 2,004 | 8 | |
| Real Time | 18–20 Jul | 45 | 42 | —N/a | —N/a | —N/a | —N/a | 13 | ±2 pp | 2,000 | 3 | |
| Real Time | 18–20 Jul | 43 | —N/a | 44 | —N/a | —N/a | —N/a | 13 | ±2 pp | 2,000 | 1 | |
| Real Time | 18–20 Jul | 44 | —N/a | —N/a | 38 | —N/a | —N/a | 18 | ±2 pp | 2,000 | 6 | |
| Real Time | 18–20 Jul | 44 | —N/a | —N/a | —N/a | 35 | —N/a | 21 | ±2 pp | 2,000 | 9 | |
| Indexa | 16–19 Jul | 46 | 39 | —N/a | —N/a | —N/a | —N/a | 15 | ±2.2 pp | 2,000 | 7 | |
| Indexa | 16–19 Jul | 45 | —N/a | 37 | —N/a | —N/a | —N/a | 18 | ±2.2 pp | 2,000 | 8 | |
| Indexa | 16–19 Jul | 46 | —N/a | —N/a | 32 | —N/a | —N/a | 22 | ±2.2 pp | 2,000 | 14 | |
| Indexa | 16–19 Jul | 47 | —N/a | —N/a | —N/a | 27 | —N/a | 26 | ±2.2 pp | 2,000 | 20 | |
| PoderData | 12–15 Jul | 45 | 43 | —N/a | —N/a | —N/a | —N/a | 11 | ±2 pp | 2,400 | 2 | |
| PoderData | 12–15 Jul | 44 | —N/a | 43 | —N/a | —N/a | —N/a | 14 | ±2 pp | 2,400 | 1 | |
| PoderData | 12–15 Jul | 44 | —N/a | —N/a | 41 | —N/a | —N/a | 15 | ±2 pp | 2,400 | 3 | |
| PoderData | 12–15 Jul | 43 | —N/a | —N/a | —N/a | 38 | —N/a | 19 | ±2 pp | 2,400 | 5 | |
| Quaest | 10–13 Jul | 45 | 37 | —N/a | —N/a | —N/a | —N/a | 18 | ±2 pp | 2,004 | 8 | |
| Quaest | 10–13 Jul | 45 | —N/a | 36 | —N/a | —N/a | —N/a | 19 | ±2 pp | 2,004 | 9 | |
| Quaest | 10–13 Jul | 45 | —N/a | —N/a | 35 | —N/a | —N/a | 20 | ±2 pp | 2,004 | 10 | |
| Quaest | 10–13 Jul | 45 | —N/a | —N/a | —N/a | 33 | —N/a | 22 | ±2 pp | 2,004 | 12 | |
| Nexus | 10–12 Jul | 47 | 44 | —N/a | —N/a | —N/a | —N/a | 9 | ±2 pp | 2,003 | 3 | |
| Nexus | 10–12 Jul | 47 | —N/a | 38 | —N/a | —N/a | —N/a | 15 | ±2 pp | 2,003 | 9 | |
| Nexus | 10–12 Jul | 47 | —N/a | —N/a | 40 | —N/a | —N/a | 13 | ±2 pp | 2,003 | 7 | |
| Nexus | 10–12 Jul | 49 | —N/a | —N/a | —N/a | 35 | —N/a | 16 | ±2 pp | 2,003 | 14 | |
| Futura | 7–11 Jul | 46.3 | 46.1 | —N/a | —N/a | —N/a | —N/a | 7.6 | ±2.2 pp | 2,000 | 0.2 | |
| Futura | 7–11 Jul | 45.1 | —N/a | 38.9 | —N/a | —N/a | —N/a | 15.9 | ±2.2 pp | 2,000 | 6.2 | |
| Futura | 7–11 Jul | 46 | —N/a | —N/a | 38.1 | —N/a | —N/a | 15.9 | ±2.2 pp | 2,000 | 7.9 | |
| Futura | 7–11 Jul | 46.4 | —N/a | —N/a | —N/a | 33.1 | —N/a | 20.5 | ±2.2 pp | 2,000 | 13.3 | |
| Ideia | 3–6 Jul | 45 | 40 | —N/a | —N/a | —N/a | —N/a | 15 | ±2.5 pp | 1,500 | 5 | |
| Ideia | 3–6 Jul | 45 | —N/a | 37.6 | —N/a | —N/a | —N/a | 17.4 | ±2.5 pp | 1,500 | 7.4 | |
| Ideia | 3–6 Jul | 45 | —N/a | —N/a | 37 | —N/a | —N/a | 18 | ±2.5 pp | 1,500 | 8 | |
| Ideia | 3–6 Jul | 45 | —N/a | —N/a | —N/a | 33 | —N/a | 22 | ±2.5 pp | 1,500 | 12 | |
| AtlasIntel | 26–30 Jun | 48.8 | 42.3 | —N/a | —N/a | —N/a | —N/a | 8.9 | ±1 pp | 4,999 | 6.5 | |
| AtlasIntel | 26–30 Jun | 48 | —N/a | 39 | —N/a | —N/a | —N/a | 13.1 | ±1 pp | 4,999 | 9 | |
| AtlasIntel | 26–30 Jun | 48.2 | —N/a | —N/a | 38.5 | —N/a | —N/a | 13.3 | ±1 pp | 4,999 | 9.7 | |
| AtlasIntel | 26–30 Jun | 49.2 | —N/a | —N/a | —N/a | 28.9 | —N/a | 21.9 | ±1 pp | 4,999 | 20.3 | |
| Nexus | 26–28 Jun | 47 | 44 | —N/a | —N/a | —N/a | —N/a | 9 | ±2 pp | 2,009 | 3 | |
| Nexus | 26–28 Jun | 47 | —N/a | 39 | —N/a | —N/a | —N/a | 14 | ±2 pp | 2,009 | 8 | |
| Nexus | 26–28 Jun | 48 | —N/a | —N/a | 38 | —N/a | —N/a | 15 | ±2 pp | 2,009 | 10 | |
| Nexus | 26–28 Jun | 48 | —N/a | —N/a | —N/a | 36 | —N/a | 17 | ±2 pp | 2,009 | 12 | |
| Vox Brasil | 23–25 Jun | 45.3 | 42.8 | —N/a | —N/a | —N/a | —N/a | 11.9 | ±2.15 pp | 2,100 | 2.5 | |
| Vox Brasil | 23–25 Jun | 44.6 | —N/a | 40.8 | —N/a | —N/a | —N/a | 14.6 | ±2.15 pp | 2,100 | 3.8 | |
| Vox Brasil | 23–25 Jun | 45.5 | —N/a | —N/a | 41.3 | —N/a | —N/a | 13.2 | ±2.15 pp | 2,100 | 4.2 | |
| PoderData | 21–24 Jun | 46 | 43 | —N/a | —N/a | —N/a | —N/a | 11 | ±2 pp | 2,400 | 3 | |
| PoderData | 21–24 Jun | 45 | —N/a | 42 | —N/a | —N/a | —N/a | 13 | ±2 pp | 2,400 | 3 | |
| PoderData | 21–24 Jun | 45 | —N/a | —N/a | 42 | —N/a | —N/a | 13 | ±2 pp | 2,400 | 3 | |
| PoderData | 21–24 Jun | 45 | —N/a | —N/a | —N/a | 38 | —N/a | 17 | ±2 pp | 2,400 | 7 | |
| Indexa | 18–20 Jun | 47 | 40 | —N/a | —N/a | —N/a | —N/a | 13 | ±2.2 pp | 2,000 | 7 | |
| Indexa | 18–20 Jun | 47 | —N/a | 39 | —N/a | —N/a | —N/a | 14 | ±2.2 pp | 2,000 | 8 | |
| Indexa | 18–20 Jun | 47 | —N/a | —N/a | 36 | —N/a | —N/a | 18 | ±2.2 pp | 2,000 | 11 | |
| Indexa | 18–20 Jun | 48 | —N/a | —N/a | —N/a | 28 | —N/a | 25 | ±2.2 pp | 2,000 | 20 | |
| Datafolha | 17–18 Jun | 47 | 43 | —N/a | —N/a | —N/a | —N/a | 9 | ±2 pp | 2,004 | 4 | |
| Datafolha | 17–18 Jun | 47 | —N/a | 41 | —N/a | —N/a | —N/a | 12 | ±2 pp | 2,004 | 6 | |
| Datafolha | 17–18 Jun | 48 | —N/a | —N/a | 39 | —N/a | —N/a | 13 | ±2 pp | 2,004 | 9 | |
| Nexus | 12–14 Jun | 49 | 43 | —N/a | —N/a | —N/a | —N/a | 9 | ±2 pp | 2,017 | 6 | |
| Nexus | 12–14 Jun | 48 | —N/a | 39 | —N/a | —N/a | —N/a | 13 | ±2 pp | 2,017 | 9 | |
| Nexus | 12–14 Jun | 49 | —N/a | —N/a | 39 | —N/a | —N/a | 12 | ±2 pp | 2,017 | 10 | |
| Nexus | 12–14 Jun | 49 | —N/a | —N/a | —N/a | 36 | —N/a | 15 | ±2 pp | 2,017 | 13 | |
| MDA | 10–14 Jun | 49.3 | 36.8 | —N/a | —N/a | —N/a | —N/a | 13.9 | ±2.2 pp | 2,000 | 12.5 | |
| MDA | 10–14 Jun | 48.4 | —N/a | 32.2 | —N/a | —N/a | —N/a | 19.4 | ±2.2 pp | 2,000 | 16.2 | |
| MDA | 10–14 Jun | 48.8 | —N/a | —N/a | 31.6 | —N/a | —N/a | 19.6 | ±2.2 pp | 2,000 | 17.2 | |
| MDA | 10–14 Jun | 49.3 | —N/a | —N/a | —N/a | 28 | —N/a | 22.8 | ±2.2 pp | 2,000 | 21.3 | |
| MDA | 10–14 Jun | 49.2 | —N/a | —N/a | —N/a | —N/a | 28.4 | 22.4 | ±2.2 pp | 2,000 | 20.8 | |
| Futura | 8–12 Jun | 48.1 | 42.9 | —N/a | —N/a | —N/a | —N/a | 9 | ±2.2 pp | 2,000 | 5.2 | |
| Futura | 8–12 Jun | 45 | —N/a | 36.3 | —N/a | —N/a | —N/a | 18.7 | ±2.2 pp | 2,000 | 8.7 | |
| Futura | 8–12 Jun | 48.5 | —N/a | —N/a | 34.9 | —N/a | —N/a | 16.6 | ±2.2 pp | 2,000 | 13.6 | |
| Futura | 8–12 Jun | 48.3 | —N/a | —N/a | —N/a | 30.8 | —N/a | 20.9 | ±2.2 pp | 2,000 | 17.5 | |
| Quaest | 3–8 Jun | 44 | 38 | —N/a | —N/a | —N/a | —N/a | 18 | ±2 pp | 2,004 | 6 | |
| Quaest | 3–8 Jun | 45 | —N/a | 35 | —N/a | —N/a | —N/a | 20 | ±2 pp | 2,004 | 10 | |
| Quaest | 3–8 Jun | 45 | —N/a | —N/a | 35 | —N/a | —N/a | 20 | ±2 pp | 2,004 | 10 | |
| Quaest | 3–8 Jun | 45 | —N/a | —N/a | —N/a | 31 | —N/a | 24 | ±2 pp | 2,004 | 14 | |
| Vox Brasil | 1–3 Jun | 47.8 | 41.3 | —N/a | —N/a | —N/a | —N/a | 10.9 | ±2.15 pp | 2,100 | 6.5 | |
| Vox Brasil | 1–3 Jun | 46.5 | —N/a | 44.9 | —N/a | —N/a | —N/a | 8.6 | ±2.15 pp | 2,100 | 1.6 | |
| Vox Brasil | 1–3 Jun | 46.3 | —N/a | —N/a | 42.5 | —N/a | —N/a | 11.2 | ±2.15 pp | 2,100 | 3.8 | |
| Real Time | 29–30 May | 45 | 40 | —N/a | —N/a | —N/a | —N/a | 15 | ±2 pp | 2,000 | 5 | |
| Real Time | 29–30 May | 43 | —N/a | 43 | —N/a | —N/a | —N/a | 14 | ±2 pp | 2,000 | Tie | |
| Real Time | 29–30 May | 43 | —N/a | —N/a | 40 | —N/a | —N/a | 17 | ±2 pp | 2,000 | 3 | |
| Real Time | 29–30 May | 46 | —N/a | —N/a | —N/a | 30 | —N/a | 24 | ±2 pp | 2,000 | 16 | |
| PoderData | 25–28 May | 46 | 42 | —N/a | —N/a | —N/a | —N/a | 12 | ±2 pp | 2,400 | 4 | |
| PoderData | 25–28 May | 45 | —N/a | 41 | —N/a | —N/a | —N/a | 14 | ±2 pp | 2,400 | 4 | |
| PoderData | 25–28 May | 45 | —N/a | —N/a | 41 | —N/a | —N/a | 15 | ±2 pp | 2,400 | 4 | |
| PoderData | 25–28 May | 45 | —N/a | —N/a | —N/a | 36 | —N/a | 19 | ±2 pp | 2,400 | 9 | |
| Ideia | 23–27 May | 46.5 | 41.4 | —N/a | —N/a | —N/a | —N/a | 12.2 | ±2.5 pp | 1,500 | 5.1 | |
| Ideia | 23–27 May | 46 | —N/a | 40 | —N/a | —N/a | —N/a | 14 | ±2.5 pp | 1,500 | 6 | |
| Ideia | 23–27 May | 46 | —N/a | —N/a | 37 | —N/a | —N/a | 17 | ±2.5 pp | 1,500 | 9 | |
| Ideia | 23–27 May | 46 | —N/a | —N/a | —N/a | 31 | —N/a | 23 | ±2.5 pp | 1,500 | 15 | |
| Indexa | 22–24 May | 46 | 41 | —N/a | —N/a | —N/a | —N/a | 10 | ±2.2 pp | 2,000 | 5 | |
| Indexa | 22–24 May | 47 | —N/a | 39 | —N/a | —N/a | —N/a | 14 | ±2.2 pp | 2,000 | 8 | |
| Indexa | 22–24 May | 47 | —N/a | —N/a | 37 | —N/a | —N/a | 16 | ±2.2 pp | 2,000 | 10 | |
| Nexus | 22–24 May | 47 | 43 | —N/a | —N/a | —N/a | —N/a | 10 | ±2 pp | 2,045 | 4 | |
| Nexus | 22–24 May | 46 | —N/a | 40 | —N/a | —N/a | —N/a | 13 | ±2 pp | 2,045 | 6 | |
| Nexus | 22–24 May | 49 | —N/a | —N/a | 38 | —N/a | —N/a | 13 | ±2 pp | 2,045 | 11 | |
| Datafolha | 20–22 May | 47 | 43 | —N/a | —N/a | —N/a | —N/a | 11 | ±2 pp | 2,004 | 4 | |
| Datafolha | 20–22 May | 48 | —N/a | 39 | —N/a | —N/a | —N/a | 13 | ±2 pp | 2,004 | 9 | |
| Datafolha | 20–22 May | 48 | —N/a | —N/a | 39 | —N/a | —N/a | 13 | ±2 pp | 2,004 | 9 | |
| Futura | 15–20 May | 47.7 | 42.2 | —N/a | —N/a | —N/a | —N/a | 10.2 | ±2.2 pp | 2,000 | 5.5 | |
| Futura | 15–20 May | 47.6 | —N/a | 36.5 | —N/a | —N/a | —N/a | 15.9 | ±2.2 pp | 2,000 | 11.1 | |
| Futura | 15–20 May | 48.3 | —N/a | —N/a | 35.9 | —N/a | —N/a | 15.8 | ±2.2 pp | 2,000 | 12.4 | |
| Vox Brasil | 17–19 May | 46.8 | 38.1 | —N/a | —N/a | —N/a | —N/a | 15.1 | ±2.15 pp | 2,100 | 8.7 | |
| Vox Brasil | 17–19 May | 47.8 | —N/a | 34.1 | —N/a | —N/a | —N/a | 18.1 | ±2.15 pp | 2,100 | 13.7 | |
| Vox Brasil | 17–19 May | 48.5 | —N/a | —N/a | 36.3 | —N/a | —N/a | 15.2 | ±2.15 pp | 2,100 | 12.2 | |
| AtlasIntel | 13–18 May | 48.9 | 41.8 | —N/a | —N/a | —N/a | —N/a | 9.3 | ±1 pp | 5,032 | 7.1 | |
| AtlasIntel | 13–18 May | 47.5 | —N/a | 38.5 | —N/a | —N/a | —N/a | 14 | ±1 pp | 5,032 | 9 | |
| AtlasIntel | 13–18 May | 47.8 | —N/a | —N/a | 37.6 | —N/a | —N/a | 14.6 | ±1 pp | 5,032 | 10.2 | |
| AtlasIntel | 13–18 May | 47.8 | —N/a | —N/a | —N/a | 28.4 | —N/a | 23.8 | ±1 pp | 5,032 | 19.4 | |
| | 13 May | Leaked audio recordings linked Flávio Bolsonaro to Daniel Vorcaro, central figure in the Banco Master scandal. | | | | | | | | | | |
| Datafolha | 12–13 May | 45 | 45 | —N/a | —N/a | —N/a | —N/a | 10 | ±2 pp | 2,004 | Tie | |
| Datafolha | 12–13 May | 46 | —N/a | 39 | —N/a | —N/a | —N/a | 15 | ±2 pp | 2,004 | 7 | |
| Datafolha | 12–13 May | 46 | —N/a | —N/a | 40 | —N/a | —N/a | 15 | ±2 pp | 2,004 | 6 | |
| Vox Brasil | 9–12 May | 40.2 | 43.8 | —N/a | —N/a | —N/a | —N/a | 16 | ±2.15 pp | 2,100 | 3.6 | |
| Vox Brasil | 9–12 May | 42.9 | —N/a | 32.5 | —N/a | —N/a | —N/a | 24.6 | ±2.15 pp | 2,100 | 10.4 | |
| Vox Brasil | 9–12 May | 43.1 | —N/a | —N/a | 34.3 | —N/a | —N/a | 22.6 | ±2.15 pp | 2,100 | 8.8 | |
| Vox Brasil | 9–12 May | 44.4 | —N/a | —N/a | —N/a | 26.2 | —N/a | 29.4 | ±2.15 pp | 2,100 | 18.2 | |
| Quaest | 8–11 May | 42 | 41 | —N/a | —N/a | —N/a | —N/a | 17 | ±2 pp | 2,004 | 1 | |
| Quaest | 8–11 May | 44 | —N/a | 35 | —N/a | —N/a | —N/a | 21 | ±2 pp | 2,004 | 9 | |
| Quaest | 8–11 May | 44 | —N/a | —N/a | 37 | —N/a | —N/a | 19 | ±2 pp | 2,004 | 7 | |
| Quaest | 8–11 May | 45 | —N/a | —N/a | —N/a | 28 | —N/a | 27 | ±2 pp | 2,004 | 17 | |
| Futura | 4–8 May | 44.4 | 46.9 | —N/a | —N/a | —N/a | —N/a | 8.6 | ±2.2 pp | 2,000 | 2.5 | |
| Futura | 4–8 May | 45.1 | —N/a | 36.9 | —N/a | —N/a | —N/a | 17.9 | ±2.2 pp | 2,000 | 8.2 | |
| Futura | 4–8 May | 46 | —N/a | —N/a | 37.8 | —N/a | —N/a | 16.3 | ±2.2 pp | 2,000 | 8.2 | |
| Ideia | 1–5 May | 44.7 | 45.3 | —N/a | —N/a | —N/a | —N/a | 10 | ±2.5 pp | 1,500 | 0.6 | |
| Ideia | 1–5 May | 44.7 | —N/a | 40 | —N/a | —N/a | —N/a | 15.5 | ±2.5 pp | 1,500 | 4.7 | |
| Ideia | 1–5 May | 44 | —N/a | —N/a | 39 | —N/a | —N/a | 17 | ±2.5 pp | 1,500 | 5 | |
| Ideia | 1–5 May | 44.7 | —N/a | —N/a | —N/a | 27.6 | —N/a | 27.7 | ±2.5 pp | 1,500 | 17.1 | |
| Real Time | 2–4 May | 43 | 44 | —N/a | —N/a | —N/a | —N/a | 13 | ±2 pp | 2,000 | 1 | |
| Real Time | 2–4 May | 43 | —N/a | 42 | —N/a | —N/a | —N/a | 15 | ±2 pp | 2,000 | 1 | |
| Real Time | 2–4 May | 43 | —N/a | —N/a | 39 | —N/a | —N/a | 18 | ±2 pp | 2,000 | 4 | |
| Real Time | 2–4 May | 48 | —N/a | —N/a | —N/a | 24 | —N/a | 28 | ±2 pp | 2,000 | 24 | |
| AtlasIntel | 22–27 Apr | 47.5 | 47.8 | —N/a | —N/a | —N/a | —N/a | 4.7 | ±1 pp | 5,008 | 0.3 | |
| AtlasIntel | 22–27 Apr | 46.8 | —N/a | 42.2 | —N/a | —N/a | —N/a | 11 | ±1 pp | 5,008 | 4.6 | |
| AtlasIntel | 22–27 Apr | 47.4 | —N/a | —N/a | 46.5 | —N/a | —N/a | 6.1 | ±1 pp | 5,008 | 0.9 | |
| AtlasIntel | 22–27 Apr | 47.1 | —N/a | —N/a | —N/a | 29.5 | —N/a | 23.5 | ±1 pp | 5,008 | 17.6 | |
| Nexus | 24–26 Apr | 46 | 45 | —N/a | —N/a | —N/a | —N/a | 9 | ±2 pp | 2,028 | 1 | |
| Nexus | 24–26 Apr | 45 | —N/a | 41 | —N/a | —N/a | —N/a | 13 | ±2 pp | 2,028 | 4 | |
| Nexus | 24–26 Apr | 45 | —N/a | —N/a | 41 | —N/a | —N/a | 14 | ±2 pp | 2,028 | 4 | |
| Quaest | 9–13 Apr | 40 | 42 | —N/a | —N/a | —N/a | —N/a | 18 | ±2 pp | 2,004 | 2 | |
| Quaest | 9–13 Apr | 43 | —N/a | 35 | —N/a | —N/a | —N/a | 22 | ±2 pp | 2,004 | 8 | |
| Quaest | 9–13 Apr | 43 | —N/a | —N/a | 36 | —N/a | —N/a | 21 | ±2 pp | 2,004 | 7 | |
| Quaest | 9–13 Apr | 44 | —N/a | —N/a | —N/a | 24 | —N/a | 32 | ±2 pp | 2,004 | 20 | |
| Quaest | 9–13 Apr | 44 | —N/a | —N/a | —N/a | —N/a | 23 | 33 | ±2 pp | 2,004 | 21 | |
| MDA | 8–12 Apr | 44.9 | 40.2 | —N/a | —N/a | —N/a | —N/a | 14.9 | ±2 pp | 2,002 | 4.7 | |
| MDA | 8–12 Apr | 44.4 | —N/a | 32.7 | —N/a | —N/a | —N/a | 22.9 | ±2 pp | 2,002 | 11.7 | |
| MDA | 8–12 Apr | 45.2 | —N/a | —N/a | 31.6 | —N/a | —N/a | 23.2 | ±2 pp | 2,002 | 13.6 | |
| MDA | 8–12 Apr | 45 | —N/a | —N/a | —N/a | 28.3 | —N/a | 26.7 | ±2 pp | 2,002 | 16.7 | |
| Futura | 7–11 Apr | 42.6 | 48 | —N/a | —N/a | —N/a | —N/a | 9.4 | ±2.2 pp | 2,000 | 5.4 | |
| Futura | 7–11 Apr | 43.9 | —N/a | 38.8 | —N/a | —N/a | —N/a | 17.2 | ±2.2 pp | 2,000 | 5.1 | |
| Futura | 7–11 Apr | 44.8 | —N/a | —N/a | 38 | —N/a | —N/a | 17.1 | ±2.2 pp | 2,000 | 6.8 | |
| Datafolha | 7–9 Apr | 45 | 46 | —N/a | —N/a | —N/a | —N/a | 9 | ±2 pp | 2,004 | 1 | |
| Datafolha | 7–9 Apr | 45 | —N/a | 42 | —N/a | —N/a | —N/a | 13 | ±2 pp | 2,004 | 3 | |
| Datafolha | 7–9 Apr | 45 | —N/a | —N/a | 42 | —N/a | —N/a | 13 | ±2 pp | 2,004 | 3 | |
| Ideia | 3–7 Apr | 45.5 | 45.8 | —N/a | —N/a | —N/a | —N/a | 8.7 | ±2.5 pp | 1,500 | 0.3 | |
| Ideia | 3–7 Apr | 45 | —N/a | 39 | —N/a | —N/a | —N/a | 16 | ±2.5 pp | 1,500 | 6 | |
| Ideia | 3–7 Apr | 44.7 | —N/a | —N/a | 38.7 | —N/a | —N/a | 16.6 | ±2.5 pp | 1,500 | 6 | |
| Ideia | 3–7 Apr | 45 | —N/a | —N/a | —N/a | 26.4 | —N/a | 28.6 | ±2.5 pp | 1,500 | 18.6 | |

==== Jan–Mar ====
| Pollster firm | Polling period | | | | | | | Blank Null Undec. | Margin of error | Sample size | Lead | Link |
| Pollster firm | Polling period | Lula PT | F. Bolsonaro PL | Freitas Repub. | Caiado PSD | Ratinho PSD | Zema Novo | Blank Null Undec. | Margin of error | Sample size | Lead | Link |
|---|---|---|---|---|---|---|---|---|---|---|---|---|
| Nexus | 27–29 Mar | 46 | 46 | —N/a | —N/a | —N/a | —N/a | 7 | ±2 pp | 2,000 | Tie | |
| Nexus | 27–29 Mar | 46 | —N/a | —N/a | 41 | —N/a | —N/a | 13 | ±2 pp | 2,000 | 5 | |
| Nexus | 27–29 Mar | 46 | —N/a | —N/a | —N/a | —N/a | 40 | 14 | ±2 pp | 2,000 | 6 | |
| Paraná Pesquisas | 25–28 Mar | 44.1 | 45.2 | —N/a | —N/a | —N/a | —N/a | 10.7 | ±2.2 pp | 2,080 | 1.1 | |
| Gerp | 20–25 Mar | 45 | 48 | —N/a | —N/a | —N/a | —N/a | 8 | ±2.2 pp | 2,000 | 3 | |
| AtlasIntel | 18–23 Mar | 46.6 | 47.6 | —N/a | —N/a | —N/a | —N/a | 5.8 | ±1 pp | 5,028 | 1 | |
| AtlasIntel | 18–23 Mar | 46.3 | —N/a | 47.2 | —N/a | —N/a | —N/a | 6.5 | ±1 pp | 5,028 | 0.9 | |
| AtlasIntel | 18–23 Mar | 46.2 | —N/a | —N/a | 36.7 | —N/a | —N/a | 17.1 | ±1 pp | 5,028 | 9.5 | |
| AtlasIntel | 18–23 Mar | 46.6 | —N/a | —N/a | —N/a | —N/a | 43.7 | 9.8 | ±1 pp | 5,028 | 2.9 | |
| Ideia | 6–10 Mar | 47.4 | 45.3 | —N/a | —N/a | —N/a | —N/a | 7.3 | ±2.5 pp | 1,500 | 2.1 | |
| Ideia | 6–10 Mar | 46.4 | —N/a | 44.8 | —N/a | —N/a | —N/a | 8.8 | ±2.5 pp | 1,500 | 1.6 | |
| Ideia | 6–10 Mar | 46.5 | —N/a | —N/a | 37.5 | —N/a | —N/a | 16.1 | ±2.5 pp | 1,500 | 9 | |
| Ideia | 6–10 Mar | 46.5 | —N/a | —N/a | —N/a | 40.7 | —N/a | 12.7 | ±2.5 pp | 1,500 | 5.8 | |
| Ideia | 6–10 Mar | 46.1 | —N/a | —N/a | —N/a | —N/a | 38 | 16 | ±2.5 pp | 1,500 | 8.1 | |
| Quaest | 6–9 Mar | 41 | 41 | —N/a | —N/a | —N/a | —N/a | 18 | ±2 pp | 2,004 | Tie | |
| Quaest | 6–9 Mar | 44 | —N/a | —N/a | 32 | —N/a | —N/a | 24 | ±2 pp | 2,004 | 12 | |
| Quaest | 6–9 Mar | 42 | —N/a | —N/a | —N/a | 33 | —N/a | 25 | ±2 pp | 2,004 | 9 | |
| Quaest | 6–9 Mar | 44 | —N/a | —N/a | —N/a | —N/a | 34 | 22 | ±2 pp | 2,004 | 10 | |
| Futura | 2–6 Mar | 40.5 | 48.8 | —N/a | —N/a | —N/a | —N/a | 10.7 | ±2.2 pp | 2,000 | 8.8 | |
| Futura | 2–6 Mar | 41.4 | —N/a | 45.5 | —N/a | —N/a | —N/a | 13.1 | ±2.2 pp | 2,000 | 4.1 | |
| Datafolha | 3–5 Mar | 46 | 43 | —N/a | —N/a | —N/a | —N/a | 11 | ±2 pp | 2,004 | 3 | |
| Datafolha | 3–5 Mar | 45 | —N/a | 42 | —N/a | —N/a | —N/a | 13 | ±2 pp | 2,004 | 3 | |
| Datafolha | 3–5 Mar | 46 | —N/a | —N/a | 36 | —N/a | —N/a | 18 | ±2 pp | 2,004 | 10 | |
| Datafolha | 3–5 Mar | 45 | —N/a | —N/a | —N/a | 41 | —N/a | 15 | ±2 pp | 2,004 | 4 | |
| Real Time | 28 Feb – 2 Mar | 42 | 41 | —N/a | —N/a | —N/a | —N/a | 17 | ±2 pp | 2,000 | 1 | |
| Real Time | 28 Feb – 2 Mar | 45 | —N/a | —N/a | 36 | —N/a | —N/a | 19 | ±2 pp | 2,000 | 9 | |
| Real Time | 28 Feb – 2 Mar | 43 | —N/a | —N/a | —N/a | 39 | —N/a | 18 | ±2 pp | 2,000 | 4 | |
| Real Time | 28 Feb – 2 Mar | 44 | —N/a | —N/a | —N/a | —N/a | 35 | 21 | ±2 pp | 2,000 | 9 | |
| Paraná Pesquisas | 22–25 Feb | 43.8 | 44.4 | —N/a | —N/a | —N/a | —N/a | 11.9 | ±2.2 pp | 2,080 | 0.6 | |
| Paraná Pesquisas | 22–25 Feb | 45.3 | —N/a | —N/a | 36.2 | —N/a | —N/a | 18.4 | ±2.2 pp | 2,080 | 9.1 | |
| Paraná Pesquisas | 22–25 Feb | 43.6 | —N/a | —N/a | —N/a | 39.7 | —N/a | 16.7 | ±2.2 pp | 2,080 | 3.9 | |
| AtlasIntel | 19–24 Feb | 46.2 | 46.3 | —N/a | —N/a | —N/a | —N/a | 7.5 | ±1 pp | 4,986 | 0.1 | |
| AtlasIntel | 19–24 Feb | 45.9 | —N/a | 47.1 | —N/a | —N/a | —N/a | 7 | ±1 pp | 4,986 | 1.2 | |
| AtlasIntel | 19–24 Feb | 45.7 | —N/a | —N/a | 37.6 | —N/a | —N/a | 16.7 | ±1 pp | 4,986 | 8.1 | |
| AtlasIntel | 19–24 Feb | 45.5 | —N/a | —N/a | —N/a | 39 | —N/a | 15.5 | ±1 pp | 4,986 | 6.5 | |
| AtlasIntel | 19–24 Feb | 46 | —N/a | —N/a | —N/a | —N/a | 41.7 | 12.3 | ±1 pp | 4,986 | 4.3 | |
| Quaest | 5–9 Feb | 43 | 38 | —N/a | —N/a | —N/a | —N/a | 19 | ±2 pp | 2,004 | 5 | |
| Quaest | 5–9 Feb | 42 | —N/a | —N/a | 32 | —N/a | —N/a | 26 | ±2 pp | 2,004 | 10 | |
| Quaest | 5–9 Feb | 43 | —N/a | —N/a | —N/a | 35 | —N/a | 22 | ±2 pp | 2,004 | 8 | |
| Quaest | 5–9 Feb | 43 | —N/a | —N/a | —N/a | —N/a | 32 | 25 | ±2 pp | 2,004 | 11 | |
| Futura | 3–7 Feb | 42.4 | 48.2 | —N/a | —N/a | —N/a | —N/a | 9.4 | ±2.2 pp | 2,000 | 5.8 | |
| Futura | 3–7 Feb | 41.4 | —N/a | 47.4 | —N/a | —N/a | —N/a | 11.2 | ±2.2 pp | 2,000 | 6 | |
| Gerp | 28 Jan – 2 Feb | 45 | 45 | —N/a | —N/a | —N/a | —N/a | 10 | ±2.2 pp | 2,000 | Tie | |
| Gerp | 28 Jan – 2 Feb | 47 | —N/a | —N/a | 34 | —N/a | —N/a | 19 | ±2.2 pp | 2,000 | 2 | |
| Gerp | 28 Jan – 2 Feb | 45 | —N/a | —N/a | —N/a | 41 | —N/a | 14 | ±2.2 pp | 2,000 | 6 | |
| Gerp | 28 Jan – 2 Feb | 47 | —N/a | —N/a | —N/a | —N/a | 36 | 17 | ±2.2 pp | 2,000 | 6 | |
| Ideia | 30 Jan – 2 Feb | 45.8 | 41.1 | —N/a | —N/a | —N/a | —N/a | 13.1 | ±2.5 pp | 1,500 | 4.7 | |
| Ideia | 30 Jan – 2 Feb | 44.7 | —N/a | 42.2 | —N/a | —N/a | —N/a | 13.1 | ±2.5 pp | 1,500 | 2.5 | |
| Ideia | 30 Jan – 2 Feb | 45 | —N/a | —N/a | 34 | —N/a | —N/a | 21 | ±2.5 pp | 1,500 | 11 | |
| Ideia | 30 Jan – 2 Feb | 45 | —N/a | —N/a | —N/a | 38 | —N/a | 17 | ±2.5 pp | 1,500 | 7 | |
| Ideia | 30 Jan – 2 Feb | 45 | —N/a | —N/a | —N/a | —N/a | 34.5 | 20.5 | ±2.5 pp | 1,500 | 10.5 | |
| Paraná Pesquisas | 25–28 Jan | 44.8 | 42.2 | —N/a | —N/a | —N/a | —N/a | 13 | ±2.2 pp | 2,080 | 2.6 | |
| Paraná Pesquisas | 25–28 Jan | 43.9 | —N/a | 42.5 | —N/a | —N/a | —N/a | 13.7 | ±2.2 pp | 2,080 | 1.4 | |
| Paraná Pesquisas | 25–28 Jan | 44.7 | —N/a | —N/a | —N/a | 38.9 | —N/a | 16.4 | ±2.2 pp | 2,080 | 5.8 | |
| AtlasIntel | 15–20 Jan | 49 | 45 | —N/a | —N/a | —N/a | —N/a | 6 | ±1 pp | 5,418 | 4 | |
| AtlasIntel | 15–20 Jan | 49 | —N/a | 45 | —N/a | —N/a | —N/a | 6 | ±1 pp | 5,418 | 4 | |
| AtlasIntel | 15–20 Jan | 49 | —N/a | —N/a | —N/a | 39 | —N/a | 12 | ±1 pp | 5,418 | 10 | |
| AtlasIntel | 15–20 Jan | 49 | —N/a | —N/a | —N/a | —N/a | 39 | 12 | ±1 pp | 5,418 | 10 | |
| AtlasIntel | 15–20 Jan | 49 | —N/a | —N/a | 39 | —N/a | —N/a | 12 | ±1 pp | 5,418 | 10 | |
| Futura | 15–19 Jan | 41.9 | 48.1 | —N/a | —N/a | —N/a | —N/a | 10 | ±2.2 pp | 2,000 | 6.2 | |
| Futura | 15–19 Jan | 41.3 | —N/a | 46.1 | —N/a | —N/a | —N/a | 12.5 | ±2.2 pp | 2,000 | 4.8 | |
| Ideia | 8–12 Jan | 46.2 | 36 | —N/a | —N/a | —N/a | —N/a | 17.8 | ±2.2 pp | 2,000 | 10.2 | |
| Ideia | 8–12 Jan | 44.4 | —N/a | 42.1 | —N/a | —N/a | —N/a | 13.6 | ±2.2 pp | 2,000 | 2.3 | |
| Ideia | 8–12 Jan | 46 | —N/a | —N/a | —N/a | 37 | —N/a | 17.1 | ±2.2 pp | 2,000 | 9 | |
| Ideia | 8–12 Jan | 46.3 | —N/a | —N/a | —N/a | —N/a | 36.1 | 17.7 | ±2.2 pp | 2,000 | 10.2 | |
| Ideia | 8–12 Jan | 46.3 | —N/a | —N/a | 36.5 | —N/a | —N/a | 17.3 | ±2.2 pp | 2,000 | 9.8 | |
| Quaest | 8–11 Jan | 45 | 38 | —N/a | —N/a | —N/a | —N/a | 17 | ±2 pp | 2,004 | 7 | |
| Quaest | 8–11 Jan | 44 | —N/a | 39 | —N/a | —N/a | —N/a | 17 | ±2 pp | 2,004 | 5 | |
| Quaest | 8–11 Jan | 43 | —N/a | —N/a | —N/a | 36 | —N/a | 21 | ±2 pp | 2,004 | 7 | |
| Quaest | 8–11 Jan | 46 | —N/a | —N/a | —N/a | —N/a | 31 | 23 | ±2 pp | 2,004 | 15 | |
| Quaest | 8–11 Jan | 44 | —N/a | —N/a | 33 | —N/a | —N/a | 23 | ±2 pp | 2,004 | 11 | |

=== 2025 ===
| Polling firm | Polling period | Lula | F. Bolsonaro | Freitas | Ratinho | Zema | Caiado | Blank Null Undec. | Margin of error | Sample size | Lead | Link |
|---|---|---|---|---|---|---|---|---|---|---|---|---|
| Paraná Pesquisas | 18–22 Dec | 44.1 | 41 | —N/a | —N/a | —N/a | —N/a | 14.9 | ±2.2 pp | 2,038 | 3.1 | |
| Paraná Pesquisas | 18–22 Dec | 44 | —N/a | 42.5 | —N/a | —N/a | —N/a | 13.5 | ±2.2 pp | 2,038 | 1.5 | |
| Paraná Pesquisas | 18–22 Dec | 43.8 | —N/a | —N/a | 40.2 | —N/a | —N/a | 16 | ±2.2 pp | 2,038 | 3.6 | |
| AtlasIntel | 10–15 Dec | 53 | 41 | —N/a | —N/a | —N/a | —N/a | 4 | ±1 pp | 18,154 | 12 | |
| AtlasIntel | 10–15 Dec | 49 | —N/a | 45 | —N/a | —N/a | —N/a | 5 | ±1 pp | 18,154 | 4 | |
| AtlasIntel | 10–15 Dec | 49 | —N/a | —N/a | 39 | —N/a | —N/a | 12 | ±1 pp | 18,154 | 10 | |
| AtlasIntel | 10–15 Dec | 49 | —N/a | —N/a | —N/a | 39 | —N/a | 12 | ±1 pp | 18,154 | 10 | |
| AtlasIntel | 10–15 Dec | 49 | —N/a | —N/a | —N/a | —N/a | 39 | 12 | ±1 pp | 18,154 | 10 | |
| Quaest | 11–14 Dec | 46 | 36 | —N/a | —N/a | —N/a | —N/a | 18 | ±2 pp | 2,004 | 10 | |
| Quaest | 11–14 Dec | 45 | —N/a | 35 | —N/a | —N/a | —N/a | 20 | ±2 pp | 2,004 | 10 | |
| Quaest | 11–14 Dec | 45 | —N/a | —N/a | 35 | —N/a | —N/a | 20 | ±2 pp | 2,004 | 10 | |
| Quaest | 11–14 Dec | 45 | —N/a | —N/a | —N/a | 33 | —N/a | 22 | ±2 pp | 2,004 | 12 | |
| Quaest | 11–14 Dec | 44 | —N/a | —N/a | —N/a | —N/a | 33 | 23 | ±2 pp | 2,004 | 11 | |
| Gerp | 6–10 Dec | 41 | 42 | —N/a | —N/a | —N/a | —N/a | 17 | ±2.2 pp | 2,000 | 1 | |
| Gerp | 6–10 Dec | 41 | —N/a | —N/a | 39 | —N/a | —N/a | 20 | ±2.2 pp | 2,000 | 2 | |
| Gerp | 6–10 Dec | 40 | —N/a | —N/a | —N/a | 34 | —N/a | 26 | ±2.2 pp | 2,000 | 6 | |
| Gerp | 6–10 Dec | 40 | —N/a | —N/a | —N/a | —N/a | 34 | 26 | ±2.2 pp | 2,000 | 6 | |
| Veritá | 6–7 Dec | 40.3 | —N/a | 44.9 | —N/a | —N/a | —N/a | 14.8 | ±2 pp | 2,519 | 4.6 | |
| Veritá | 6–7 Dec | 39.8 | 39.2 | —N/a | —N/a | —N/a | —N/a | 21 | ±2 pp | 2,519 | 0.6 | |
| Datafolha | 2–4 Dec | 47 | —N/a | 42 | —N/a | —N/a | —N/a | 11 | ±2 pp | 2,002 | 5 | |
| Datafolha | 2–4 Dec | 47 | —N/a | —N/a | 41 | —N/a | —N/a | 12 | ±2 pp | 2,002 | 6 | |
| Datafolha | 2–4 Dec | 51 | 36 | —N/a | —N/a | —N/a | —N/a | 13 | ±2 pp | 2,002 | 15 | |
| AtlasIntel | 22–27 Nov | 49 | —N/a | 47 | —N/a | —N/a | —N/a | 4 | ±1 pp | 5,510 | 2 | |
| AtlasIntel | 22–27 Nov | 49 | —N/a | —N/a | 40 | —N/a | —N/a | 11 | ±1 pp | 5,510 | 9 | |
| AtlasIntel | 22–27 Nov | 49 | —N/a | —N/a | —N/a | 41 | —N/a | 10 | ±1 pp | 5,510 | 8 | |
| AtlasIntel | 22–27 Nov | 49 | —N/a | —N/a | —N/a | —N/a | 41 | 10 | ±1 pp | 5,510 | 8 | |
| MDA | 19–23 Nov | 45.7 | —N/a | 39.1 | —N/a | —N/a | —N/a | 15.1 | ±2.2 pp | 2,002 | 6.6 | |
| MDA | 19–23 Nov | 45.8 | —N/a | —N/a | 38.7 | —N/a | —N/a | 15.5 | ±2.2 pp | 2,002 | 7.1 | |
| MDA | 19–23 Nov | 47.9 | —N/a | —N/a | —N/a | 33.5 | —N/a | 18.6 | ±2.2 pp | 2,002 | 14.4 | |
| MDA | 19–23 Nov | 46.9 | —N/a | —N/a | —N/a | —N/a | 33.7 | 19.4 | ±2.2 pp | 2,002 | 13.2 | |
| Paraná Pesquisas | 6–10 Nov | 43 | —N/a | 41.8 | —N/a | —N/a | —N/a | 15.2 | ±2.2 pp | 2,020 | 1.2 | |
| Paraná Pesquisas | 6–10 Nov | 45.4 | 38.6 | —N/a | —N/a | —N/a | —N/a | 16 | ±2.2 pp | 2,020 | 6.8 | |
| Quaest | 6–9 Nov | 41 | —N/a | 36 | —N/a | —N/a | —N/a | 23 | ±2 pp | 2,004 | 5 | |
| Paraná Pesquisas | 21–24 Oct | 44.9 | —N/a | 40.9 | —N/a | —N/a | —N/a | 14.2 | ±2.2 pp | 2,020 | 4 | |
| Paraná Pesquisas | 21–24 Oct | 46.7 | 37 | —N/a | —N/a | —N/a | —N/a | 16.3 | ±2.2 pp | 2,020 | 9.7 | |
| AtlasIntel | 15–19 Oct | 52 | —N/a | 44 | —N/a | —N/a | —N/a | 5 | ±1 pp | 14,063 | 8 | |
| Quaest | 2–5 Oct | 45 | —N/a | 33 | —N/a | —N/a | —N/a | 22 | ±2 pp | 2,004 | 12 | |
| Gerp | 29 Sep – 6 Oct | 36 | —N/a | 45 | —N/a | —N/a | —N/a | 19 | ±2.2 pp | 2,000 | 9 | |
| Quaest | 12–14 Sep | 43 | —N/a | 35 | —N/a | —N/a | —N/a | 22 | ±2 pp | 2,004 | 8 | |
| AtlasIntel | 10–14 Sep | 50.6 | —N/a | 45.2 | —N/a | —N/a | —N/a | 4.2 | ±1 pp | 7,291 | 5.4 | |
| MDA | 3–6 Sep | 43.9 | —N/a | 37.6 | —N/a | —N/a | —N/a | 18.5 | ±2 pp | 2,002 | 6.3 | |
| AtlasIntel | 20–25 Aug | 46.6 | —N/a | 48.4 | —N/a | —N/a | —N/a | 5 | ±1 pp | 6,238 | 1.8 | |
| Paraná Pesquisas | 17–21 Aug | 41.9 | —N/a | 41.9 | —N/a | —N/a | —N/a | 16.1 | ±2.2 pp | 2,020 | Tie | |
| Quaest | 13–17 Aug | 43 | —N/a | 35 | —N/a | —N/a | —N/a | 22 | ±2 pp | 12,150 | 8 | |
| Quaest | 13–17 Aug | 48 | 32 | —N/a | —N/a | —N/a | —N/a | 20 | ±2 pp | 12,150 | 16 | |
| Datafolha | 29–30 Jul | 45 | —N/a | 41 | —N/a | —N/a | —N/a | 14 | ±2 pp | 2,004 | 4 | |
| Datafolha | 29–30 Jul | 48 | 37 | —N/a | —N/a | —N/a | —N/a | 14 | ±2 pp | 2,004 | 11 | |
| AtlasIntel | 25–28 Jul | 50.4 | —N/a | 46.6 | —N/a | —N/a | —N/a | 3 | ±1 pp | 7,334 | 3.8 | |
| Quaest | 10–14 Jul | 41 | —N/a | 37 | —N/a | —N/a | —N/a | 23 | ±2 pp | 2,004 | 4 | |
| AtlasIntel | 27–30 Jun | 47.6 | —N/a | 46.9 | —N/a | —N/a | —N/a | 5.5 | ±2 pp | 2,621 | 0.7 | |
| Neokemp | 25–27 Jun | 41.7 | —N/a | 46.5 | —N/a | —N/a | —N/a | 11.9 | ±2.2 pp | 2,020 | 4.8 | |
| Futura | 12–23 Jun | 34.9 | —N/a | 46.5 | —N/a | —N/a | —N/a | 18.6 | ±2.2 pp | 2,000 | 11.6 | |
| Paraná Pesquisas | 18–22 Jun | 40.1 | —N/a | 43.6 | —N/a | —N/a | —N/a | 16.2 | ±2.2 pp | 2,020 | 3.5 | |
| Paraná Pesquisas | 18–22 Jun | 42.1 | 38.4 | —N/a | —N/a | —N/a | —N/a | 19.4 | ±2.2 pp | 2,020 | 3.7 | |
| Datafolha | 10–11 Jun | 43 | —N/a | 42 | —N/a | —N/a | —N/a | 15 | ±2 pp | 2,004 | 1 | |
| Datafolha | 10–11 Jun | 47 | 38 | —N/a | —N/a | —N/a | —N/a | 15 | ±2 pp | 2,004 | 9 | |
| Futura | 2–4 Jun | 41.1 | —N/a | 41 | —N/a | —N/a | —N/a | 17.9 | ±3.1 pp | 1,001 | 0.1 | |
| Quaest | 29 May – 1 Jun | 41 | —N/a | 40 | —N/a | —N/a | —N/a | 19 | ±2 pp | 2,004 | 1 | |
| Quaest | 29 May – 1 Jun | 40 | —N/a | —N/a | 38 | —N/a | —N/a | 22 | ±2 pp | 2,004 | 2 | |
| AtlasIntel | 19–23 May | 45.3 | —N/a | 48.9 | —N/a | —N/a | —N/a | 4.9 | ±1 pp | 4,399 | 3.6 | |
| AtlasIntel | 20–24 Apr | 46.7 | —N/a | 46.7 | —N/a | —N/a | —N/a | 6.6 | ±1 pp | 5,419 | Tie | |
| Paraná Pesquisas | 16–19 Apr | 40.6 | —N/a | 43.4 | —N/a | —N/a | —N/a | 16 | ±2.2 pp | 2,020 | 2.8 | |
| Datafolha | 1–3 Apr | 48 | —N/a | 39 | —N/a | —N/a | —N/a | 14 | ±2 pp | 3,054 | 9 | |
| Quaest | 27–31 Mar | 43 | —N/a | 37 | —N/a | —N/a | —N/a | 20 | ±2 pp | 2,004 | 6 | |
| AtlasIntel | 20–24 Mar | 46 | —N/a | 47 | —N/a | —N/a | —N/a | 7 | ±1 pp | 4,659 | 1 | |
| Futura | 19–22 Mar | 37.6 | —N/a | 42.3 | —N/a | —N/a | —N/a | 20.1 | ±3.1 pp | 1,000 | 4.7 | |
| AtlasIntel | 24–27 Feb | 47 | —N/a | 49 | —N/a | —N/a | —N/a | 4 | ±1 pp | 5,710 | 2 | |
| AtlasIntel | 27–31 Jan | 45.7 | —N/a | 44.7 | —N/a | —N/a | —N/a | 9.6 | ±2 pp | 3,125 | 1 | |
| AtlasIntel | 27–31 Jan | 47.4 | —N/a | —N/a | —N/a | —N/a | 36.5 | 16.1 | ±2 pp | 3,125 | 10.9 | |
| Quaest | 23–26 Jan | 43 | —N/a | 34 | —N/a | —N/a | —N/a | 23 | ±1 pp | 4,500 | 9 | |
| Quaest | 23–26 Jan | 45 | —N/a | —N/a | —N/a | 28 | —N/a | 27 | ±1 pp | 4,500 | 17 | |
| Quaest | 23–26 Jan | 45 | —N/a | —N/a | —N/a | —N/a | 26 | 29 | ±1 pp | 4,500 | 19 | |

== See also ==
- President of Brazil
- Opinion polling for the 2022 Brazilian general election
- Opinion polling for the 2018 Brazilian general election
