= Nando Moura =

Brazilian conservative YouTuber

- Born: Luis Fernando de Moura Cagnin; April 28, 1984 (age 42); Embu das Artes, São Paulo, Brazil
- Occupations: Music instructor; YouTuber

YouTube information
- Channel: Nando Moura
- Years active: 2012–present
- Subscribers: 3.3 million
- Views: 829.3 million
- Last updated: January 6, 2026

Luis Fernando "Nando" de Moura Cagnin (born April 28, 1984) is a Brazilian musician, music teacher and YouTuber who produces videos about heavy metal culture, video games, and politics.

== Biography ==
=== Early life ===
Born in Embu das Artes, he was the son of Antônio Luiz Cagnin, a comics studies scholar and professor at the University of São Paulo. Moura became interested in music at the age of 7 studying the electric organ, later guitar, both influenced by the group Blind Guardian. He studied in the Netherlands at the Erasmus University Rotterdam. Moura founded his heavy metal band named Pandora 101 alongside his brother Gugo in 1999, at the age of 17. He played guitar and performed vocals, while his brother played the bass. They released four albums and a few singles.

Moura was inspired by groups including Whitesnake, Iron Maiden, Kiss, Pantera, and Death. Moura explained his band's lack of success by what he sees as Brazil's lack of appreciation for quality music.

=== Youtube career ===
Created in 2012, his channel initially concentrated on his band as well as metal and pop culture. In late 2014 he shifted to a discussion of conservatism. As of 2016, Moura included references to Plato, Aristotle, Father Paulo Ricardo, and others, using a rhetorical style that Moura describes as somewhat priestly, reflecting his education at an Adventist college. In March of that same year, the channel had 500,000 subscribers and a total of 87 million views. Moura benefited from YouTube's algorithm (at least before 2019) and directed users to novel content. In February 2019, YouTube demonetized many of Moura's videos, after which Moura released several videos complaining about this decision. Still in the same year, Nando Moura published online courses and a book called Masters of Capitalism.

== Positions ==
As of 2016, Moura described himself as a conservative, saying that he emphasized preserving the good that society had produced and supporting freedom in individuals' actions. He opposed treating homosexual couples in the same manner as heterosexual ones, arguing that the former could not raise a child effectively and arguing with references to Plato and Aristotle.

Moura was a strong supporter of Jair Bolsonaro and campaigned for him in the 2018 presidential election. Later, he started to sharply criticize Bolsonaro's administration, calling him a "traitor" in a 2019 tweet criticizing the sanction of the "judge of guarantees" amendment (not foreseen in the original project of the Anti-Crime Package presented by Minister Sergio Moro). He became one of the main criticizers of Bolsonaro's government because of the government's attitudes about corruption and the COVID-19 crisis.

On April 28, 2021, Nando Moura published a video on his channel in which he appeared burning books by the writer Olavo de Carvalho in a fireplace in his own home. In a segment of the video, he states: "He [Olavo] is a disgrace to conservatives, a disgrace to conservative thought, a reactionary, cretin, fanatic behind a power scheme in our country who closed his eyes to what was happening"; "Olavo de Carvalho has become the antithesis of what he wrote."

In 2026, Nando Moura led an internet campaign against the Mission Party, the political wing of the Free Brazil Movement, to which he was previously connected through ideological affinities He accused the party's presidential candidate, Renan Santos, of having ties to the American alt-right and a Neo-nazi anonymous X profile named The Phallic Man. He also criticized the party's political project, describing it as authoritarian, and its activist base, which he argues employs large-scale harassment and intimidation tactics.

== Controversies ==
In early December 2020, Nando became involved in a controversy with the musician Matuê, claiming that Matuê's music was poor and set a bad example through lyrics evoking the usage of drugs. Matuê had participated in the Flow Podcast, which Moura claimed glorified marijuana use.

In mid-April 2019, a false story spread among networks and influencers, including Felipe Neto and Brazilian website TecMundo, that Moura would be arrested for offending a college student. In 2015, Felipe Neto was convicted in the first instance for fake news about Nando Moura. The case was later dismissed.

In February 2019, Nando erroneously stated on his channel that Joseph Stalin had two Nobel Prizes. This led to mocking on social networks. The error was later corrected in the video description.

YouTube demonetized some videos on his YouTube channel for infractions related to hate speech and disinformation.

An opinion article in The New York Times described his channel as "right-wing conspiracy-filled" and stated that it uses "pop culture as a gateway to far-right ideas".

On May 9, 2020, he became involved in a virtual fight with former Brazilian president Fernando Collor. Nando made a post saying that President Bolsonaro would manage to be even more hated than the former president. Collor mocked the post.
