= Renan Santos =

Brazilian politician (born 1984)

- Santos in 2026

President of the Mission Party
- Incumbent
- Assumed office October 17, 2023
- Preceded by: Office established

Personal details
- Born: Renan Antônio Ferreira dos Santos; February 15, 1984 (age 42) São Paulo, São Paulo, Brazil
- Party: Mission (2023–present)
- Other political affiliations: PSDB (2010–2015)
- Education: Law School, University of São Paulo
- Website: https://renansantosmbl.com/

Renan Antônio Ferreira dos Santos (born February 15, 1984) is a Brazilian political activist, entrepreneur, musician, and politician. He co-founded the Free Brazil Movement in 2014 and is the current president of the Mission Party. Placing himself as an alternative right-wing figure, he was a candidate in the 2026 Brazilian presidential election.

== Early life and activism ==
Santos was born on February 14, 1984, in São Paulo, São Paulo. He attended the Law School of the University of São Paulo, but dropped out, although he was intensely involved in student politics during the period. He was a member of the Brazilian Social Democracy Party from 2010 to 2015. In Vinhedo, alongside others, he founded the "Renew Vinhedo Movement", a young libertarian activist group, whose main characteristic was the use of the internet and an irreverent aesthetic to address their issues. The movement had connections to the political group of the former mayor of Vinhedo, Milton Serafim, and his successor, Jaime Cruz, as well as councilor Rubens Alves, who was the father of one of its members.

In 2014, members of the Renew Vinhedo Movement, including Santos, joined members of the group known as Students for Freedom and founded the Free Brazil Movement, based on common dissatisfaction with Dilma Rousseff's victory in that year's presidential election.

=== Free Brazil Movement ===
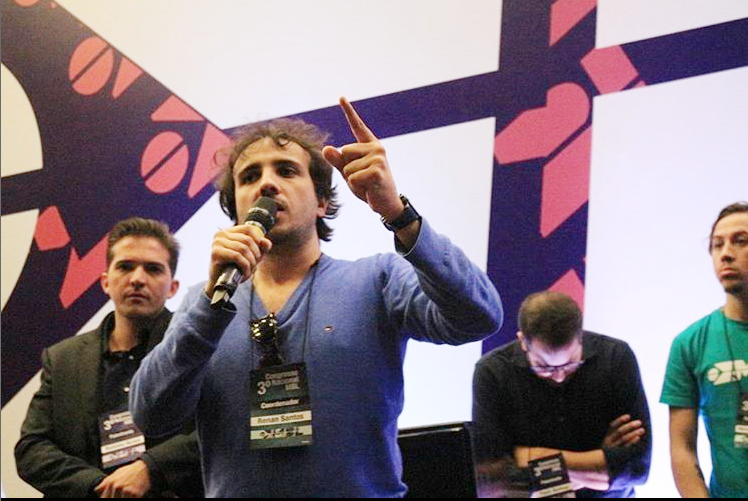
Renan Santos opening the 3rd National Congress of the Free Brazil Movement in 2018

The Free Brazil Movement was founded in 2014, in the context of protests against the increase in public transportation fares and, subsequently, mobilizations for the impeachment of Dilma Rousseff. Santos, alongside Kim Kataguiri, Fernando Holiday, Rubinho Nunes and others, became one of the main leaders of the movement. They became known for their ability to organize national protests with large turnouts, using social media as a tool for mobilization.

Santos and other members of the Free Brazil Movement decided to call for protests shortly after the headquarters of Editora Abril was graffitied by left-wing activists, following the publication of the cover of Veja featuring Lula and Rousseff and the caption "They knew everything" - a reference to the plea bargains of money launderer Alberto Youssef, within the scope of Operation Car Wash.

At the time, according to Santos himself, the Free Brazil Movement concluded that Brazil was undergoing a "Venezuelization" escalation. This was the movement's first protest, which focused on: fraud in the 2014 elections, the Workers' Party use of public funds to finance campaigns, and freedom of the press. The protest, held at the São Paulo Museum of Art, drew approximately 2,500 people.

Santos participated in popular protests that took place in various regions of Brazil, the main objectives of which were to protest against the Dilma Rousseff government and corruption allegations. Millions of people took to the streets in at least 250 Brazilian cities in the first protests on March 13, 2016, becoming the largest protest in Brazilian history. At the time, the Movement declared itself non-partisan, but Santos was caught on camera in February 2016 admitting that the Movement already had the support and funding of major political parties, such as Brazilian Social Democracy Party, Brazilian Democratic Movement, Democrats, and Solidarity.

Following the March 2016 protests, Santos and other Movement members began a march from São Paulo to Brasília, calling for Dilma Rousseff's impeachment. Dubbed the "March for Freedom", it left São Paulo on April 24 and traveled three states and over a thousand kilometers over the course of 33 days, arriving in Brasília on May 27.

== Political career ==
=== Mission Party ===
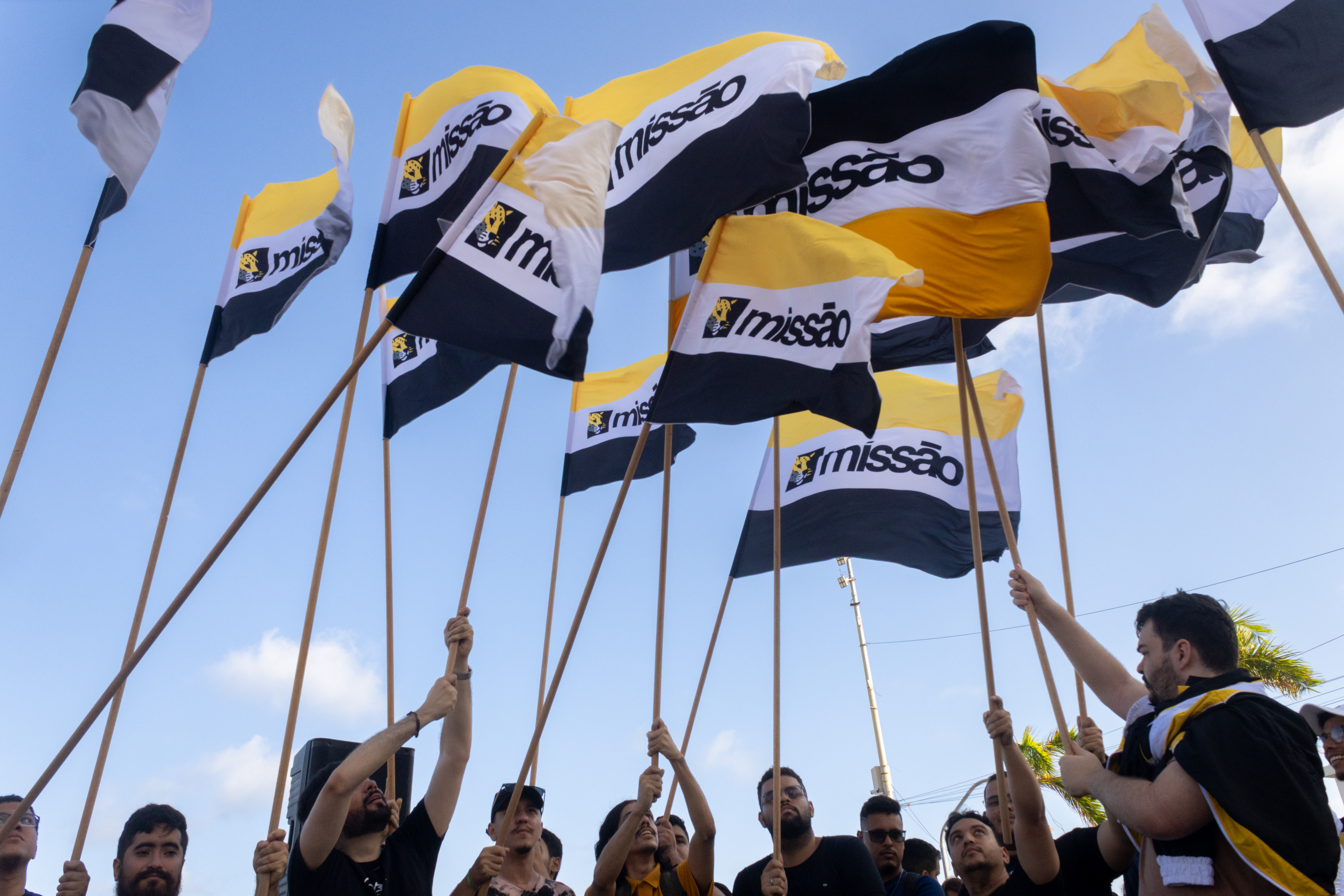
Party flags at a political rally in Recife, Pernambuco, in 2025.

For years, the Free Brazil Movement supported candidates from various parties, such as Democrats, Podemos, and Patriota. Figures like Kim Kataguiri and Arthur do Val were elected representatives under traditional parties, but without their own party directly representing the movement.

Faced with this scenario, Santos spearheaded the proposal to create a new political party. In 2024, it was officially announced as Mission Party. The name was chosen to convey a sense of purpose, transformation, and political engagement, distancing itself from traditional acronyms that, according to Santos, "carry vices of old politics."

Mission was registered with the Superior Electoral Court after collecting the necessary signatures, a process that Santos helped coordinate. In statements to the press, Santos stated that the party intends to launch candidates for all positions in 2026, including the Presidency. In addition, the party launched the Yellow Book, programmatic material that systematizes its proposals.

=== 2026 presidential election ===
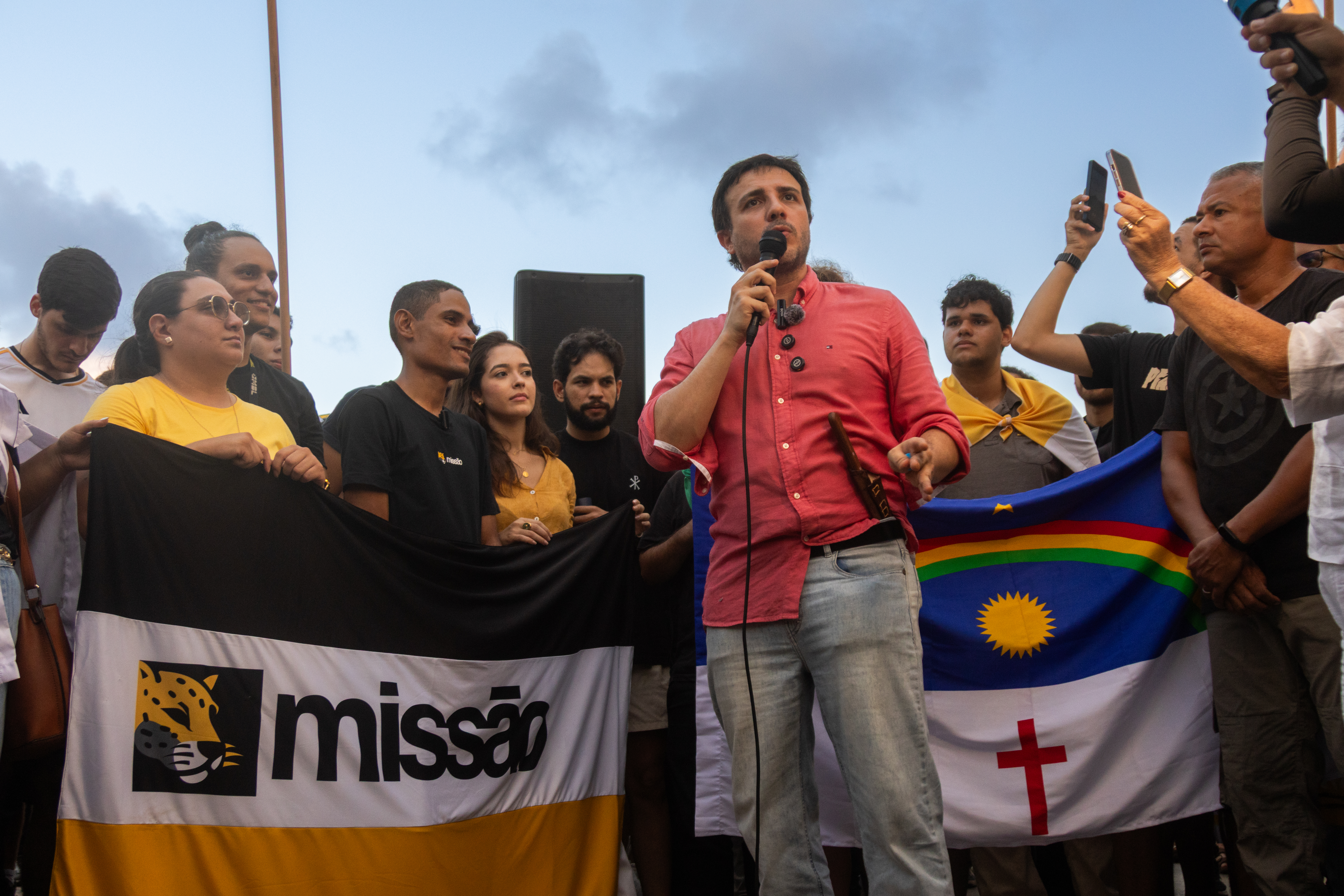
Renan Santos at a political rally in Recife, Pernambuco, in 2026.

In 2025, Santos announced his pre-candidacy for the Presidency of the Republic in the 2026 general elections, vying for the nomination of the Mission Party. His campaign has adopted a discourse that criticizes what he denounces as the "political and cultural hegemony" exercised by established parties, while simultaneously opposing both the Workers' Party (PT) and the Bolsonarist movement.

According to electoral polls released in late 2025, Santos achieved his strongest voter intention rates in surveys focused on younger demographics, particularly among Generation Z — a constituency he has stated he intends to prioritize throughout his electoral campaign.

On July 20, 2026, his candidacy was officially formalized by the Mission Party during an early virtual convention, with Aroldo Medina confirmed as his vice-presidential running mate.

== Political positions ==
Renan Santos has distinguished himself by advocating for economic liberalism, reduced state intervention, and institutional modernization, while emphasizing structural reforms and entrepreneurship; however, he has since adopted a more developmentalism-oriented stance, distancing himself from the "initial liberalism of the Free Brazil Movement" and rejecting ideological dogmatism, defining his party, Mission, as "a highly pragmatic party on the right".

On public security, he argues for a stricter state response to crime, defending a "war" against criminal organizations, stricter sentencing, and debating the introduction of life imprisonment and the reintroduction of the death penalty for non-military crimes, while also endorsing the application of enemy criminal law to gang members, whom he considers undeserving of conventional due process rights; he further advocates for the "physical" elimination of criminal organization members through incarceration or lethal force in armed confrontations.

Regarding urban policy, he proposes the eradication of favelas and their transformation into conventional neighborhoods within thirty years, describing life in such areas as unhealthy, unsafe, and inhumane, and calling for organized reconstruction with adequate infrastructure and public services.

In March 2026, he published a video accusing singer Wesley Safadão of leading a corruption scheme exploiting poor municipalities in the Northeast Region, citing over 50 contracts worth R$52 million, which led Safadão to sue him and obtain a court order for the video's removal in April 2026.

In May 2026, he publicly questioned actress Letícia Sabatella's autism diagnosis, alleging a "wave" of neurotypical individuals falsely claiming to be autistic to obtain benefits, criticizing the Berenice Piana Law and what he termed "unscrupulous psychiatrists and lawyers," and asserting that Sabatella had "glamorized" autism. Additionally, Santos defends the merger of municipalities and even states as a measure of administrative efficiency.

== Personal life ==
In April 2026, private Instagram messages surfaced in which Renan Santos stated in a political discussion group that he had consumed psychedelic mushrooms; Santos did not deny the authenticity of the messages and confirmed having used the substance on three occasions.

Alongside other members of the Free Brazil Movement, Santos also performs as a musician in the alternative rock band Limão Rosa, serving as both lead vocalist and guitarist, with influences drawn from artists such as Iggy Pop, The Velvet Underground, and Bob Dylan. The band gained national recognition in 2026 after leading the popular vote in the Temos Vagas contest, promoted by radio station 89 FM to select an independent band for the Lollapalooza Brasil festival; despite their strong performance in the public vote, the group was not chosen by the technical jury, which selected another band for the event. In June 2026, the band released its debut studio album, Chão Pintado de Rubi, featuring eleven original tracks. He is a São Paulo FC fan.

Renan was raised in a family with ties to both Catholicism and Protestantism. After a period of drifting away from religion, he reported regaining an interest in the Christian faith upon reading Confessions by Saint Augustine around 2011. In 2025, he was baptized into the Catholic Church, maintaining his identification with Catholicism ever since.

== Lawsuits and controversies ==
In 2016, the news website UOL published an investigative article titled "Free Brazil Movement leader faces more than 60 lawsuits and suffers R$4.9 million in charge." The accusations include fraudulent company closures, tax debts, fraud against creditors, default on labor debts, and moral damages lawsuits.

Santos, in turn, commented on the report, claiming that such lawsuits stem from the difficulties of business activity in Brazil, explaining that the lawsuits attributed to him and his family due to ownership of the company "Martin Artefatos de Metal" already existed before the Santos family acquired it. He criticized the article for failing to clearly state the assets the company owns listed in the lawsuit for payment of debts, noting that there was no criminal or illegal activity, and that the lawsuits are all public domain. The court ordered the freezing of the company's bank accounts, but found no funds in them. The seizure of the company's assets was then ordered, and they were auctioned in the hope of collecting amounts owed to creditors. The Federal Revenue Service understands that Santos' family adopted a strategy of buying nearly bankrupt companies, failing to declare or pay taxes, and enriching themselves through the misappropriation of taxes paid by end consumers.

According to an article by El País Brazil in September 2017, members of the Santos family linked to the Free Brazil Movement through the private association "National Renewal Movement" are responsible for more than 125 lawsuits, most related to non-payment of liquidated and certain debts, tax debts, fraud in procedural executions, and labor complaints. Together, as of September 2017, they had accumulated a debt of around 20 million reais. In a report published by the newspaper Metrópoles in March 2022, the article found that Santos owes 6.3 million reais to the federal union alone, including federal taxes and labor fines.

In 2021, Santos was involved in a public controversy after a Brazilian model came forward with sexual assault accusations. She later retracted the statement, and Santos publicly addressed the situation. The case generated significant media coverage and public debate regarding the statements made by the political figure, who affirmed his innocence and legally requested the removal of several posts that criticized him.

In the same year, a video from 2018 resurfaced, showing Santos on top of a car, in the middle of a crowd, shouting that if the group were not allowed to enter a bar, Bárbara Tonelli (a political figure from Free Brazil Movement) "would be raped". She later came forward as a long-time friend and dismissed his remarks as a bad joke.
