= Mission Party (Brazil) =

Mission Party Partido Missão
- Abbreviation: MISSÃO
- Chairperson: Renan Santos
- General Secretary: Victor Couto
- Founders: Renan Santos; Kim Kataguiri; Arthur do Val; Guto Zacarias
- Founded: 18 October 2023; 3 years ago
- Registered: 4 November 2025; 12 months ago
- Preceded by: Free Brazil Movement
- Headquarters: Brasília, DF
- Membership: 53,468 ▲
- Ideology: The Yellow Book: Conservative liberalism; Social conservatism; National liberalism; Brazilian nationalism; Technocapitalism; Bukelism; Enemy criminal law; Law and order; Fiscalism
- Political position: Right-wing to far-right
- National affiliation: Free Brazil Movement
- Colors: Black; White; Yellow
- Slogan: "The Future is Glorious"
- TSE Identification Number: 14
- Federal Senate: 0 / 81
- Chamber of Deputies: 1 / 513
- Governorships: 0 / 27
- State Assemblies: 1 / 1,024
- Mayors: 0 / 5,568
- City Councillors: 3 / 56,810

Party flag

Website
- missao.org.br

The Mission Party (Portuguese: Partido Missão, stylised MISSĀO) is a Brazilian right-wing to far-right political party, created by the Free Brazil Movement (MBL). It was founded in 2023. Members include congressman Kim Kataguiri, who is a former member of Brazil Union; former São Paulo State State Deputy Arthur do Val; and current party president Renan Santos.

On 26 June 2025, the umbrella reached the minimum number of signatures required by the Brazilian Election Justice (TSE) to request party registration. On 23 September 2025, deputy Electoral Prosecutor General, Alexandre Barbosa, stated that all the requirements for the formation of the party were met and made official. The party was officially registered by the Superior Electoral Court on 4 November 2025.

== History ==
=== Background: the Free Brazil Movement ===
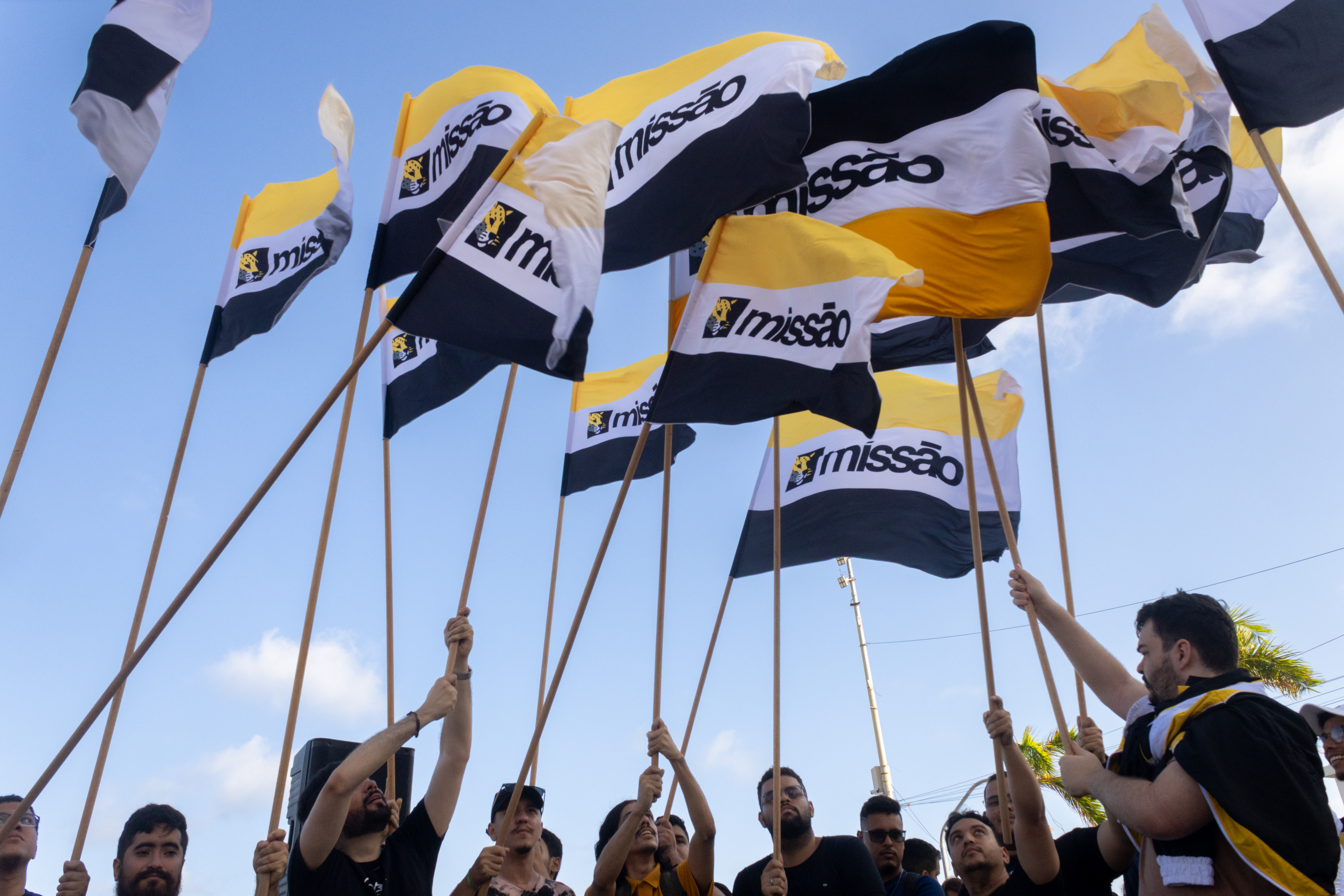
Supporters of Mission in Recife, Pernambuco, in 2026.

The Missão Party has its origins in the Free Brazil Movement (Brazilian Portuguese: Movimento Brasil Livre, MBL), a political organization founded on 1 November 2014 by Kim Kataguiri, Renan Santos, Rubinho Nunes and other activists. The movement gained national prominence by organizing demonstrations in support of Operation Car Wash and against the government of Dilma Rousseff, culminating in its support for the impeachment of Dilma Rousseff between 2015 and 2016.

Following the impeachment, the movement rallied in favour of the labour reform and the proposed pension reform of the Temer government. It established itself as a right political force, fielding and supporting candidates in the 2016 and 2018 elections, including Fernando Holiday, Kim Kataguiri and Arthur do Val, under various parties. In the 2018 elections, the party supported the candidacy of Jair Bolsonaro in the second round, but since 2019 it distanced itself from Bolsonarism, with a definitive break occurring during the demonstrations of May 2019, when Bolsonarist groups began calling for the closure of the National Congress and the impeachment of ministers of the Supreme Federal Court.

=== Foundation ===
Following the 2018 elections, MBL leaders expressed a desire to have their own political party, but initially preferred to join an existing one. In the 2020 local elections, the movement fielded a slate of candidates under the Patriota banner in São Paulo, where Arthur do Val obtained 522,210 votes (9.78% of valid votes) in the mayoral race, even surpassing the candidate of the Workers' Party (PT), as well as winning three seats in the São Paulo city council.

In 2021, negotiations began with the parties Cidadania, Podemos and New Party (NOVO) to contest the 2022 elections under a single banner. In January 2022, an agreement was signed with Podemos. However, in March 2022, after the leak of the Arthur do Val audio recordings, the MBL and Podemos split, leading a large number of members to move to União Brasil.

Following the 2022 elections, in which the MBL suffered significant defeats, the movement adopted new strategic positions: it began to advocate the use of the Special Campaign Financing Fund (FEFC) and the creation of its own party. The decision was reinforced by Brazil Union blocking Kim Kataguiri's candidacy for the mayoralty of São Paulo in 2024, favouring the then-mayor Ricardo Nunes (MDB).

On 4 November 2023, at the 8th MBL National Congress in São Paulo, the party's name, electoral number and symbols were announced. Renan Santos stated at that congress that it was impossible to build anything on the basis of the existing political parties, describing most of them as mere 'registries', whilst recognising the Workers' Party (PT) as a genuine party. The chosen mascot became the jaguar (Panthera onca), and the party colours — black, white and yellow — were based on the animal. The flag consists of three horizontal stripes in these colours, with the logo on the white stripe. The name “Missão” was chosen in reference to the terms of corporate strategic planning — mission, vision and values — distinguishing the party from the original organisation.

The process of collecting signatures was carried out in person, as MBL leaders considered the digital system made available by the TSE since 2021 to be difficult for users to access. In November 2024, the The Intercept Brasil website reported allegations that signature collectors had approached signatories without clearly explaining the aim of registering a political party. Party representatives justified the care taken to distinguish between the MBL and MISSÃO as a requirement of electoral legislation, which prohibits links between political parties and non-profit associations. At the MBL's 10th National Congress in November 2024, the movement announced that it had collected enough signatures for registration, taking into account the estimated margin of error.

On 26 June 2025, the group reached the minimum threshold of 547,043 signatures validated by the TSE. On 23 September 2025, the Electoral Public Prosecutor's Office issued a favourable opinion on the creation of the party's acronym and the use of the number 14.

=== Registration ===
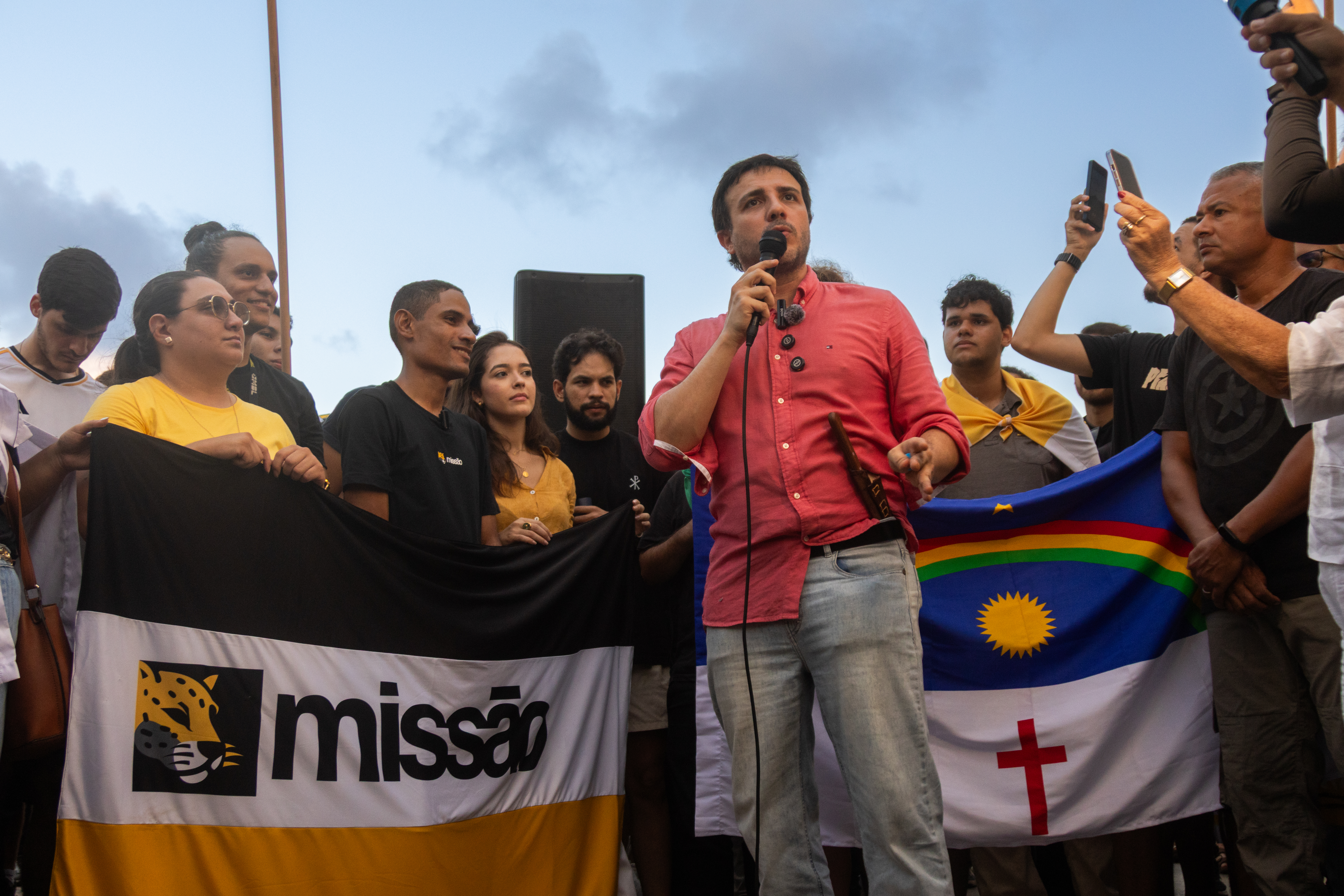
Renan Santos at a Mission political event in Recife, Pernambuco, in January 2026.

On 4 November 2025, the Plenary of the TSE unanimously approved the application for registration and the ratification of the Party Statutes of the Missão Party, with André Mendonça acting as rapporteur. The party obtained 577,999 valid endorsements, a figure exceeding the minimum requirement of 0.5 per cent of the votes cast in the last general election for the Chamber of Deputies. Following this decision, it became the 30th political party to have its constitution registered with the TSE.

On 10 November 2025, Kim Kataguiri and Guto Zacarias announced that they would join the party. In December 2025, the party counted 127 members. Throughout the first quarter of 2026, during the party registration window which closed on 3 April, the party recorded significant growth, reaching 17,382 members, making it one of four Brazilian parties to see an increase in membership between 2025 and 2026. In March 2026, Kim Kataguiri and Guto Zacarias formalised their membership.

=== 2026 elections ===
The Mission Party was eligible to stand in the 2026 general elections, marking the party's first participation in a national election. The party announced candidates for all executive and legislative posts.

Renan Santos, at a virtual convention held on 20 July, officially launched his bid for the presidency, with the retired military officer Aroldo Medina as his running mate. The event had been scheduled for 1 August, but was brought forward by the party on the grounds of threats against the candidate.

For the governorship of Rio de Janeiro, the party put forward BOPE Colonel João Jacques Soares Busnello. By April 2026, the party had confirmed prospective candidates for governor in at least seven states, including Paraná, Minas Gerais, Pernambuco and Maranhão.

As it was only registered with the TSE in 2025, the party does not have access to the party fund prior to the 2026 general elections, since such funding required compliance with the requirements of the electoral threshold in the previous election for the Chamber of Deputies.

However, the party had access to the Special Campaign Financing Fund in the 2026 elections, as 2% of the funds were distributed equally among all parties registered at the TSE. For that year's election, R$3,307,679.85 was made available for the party to conduct its electoral campaigns.

On 12 August 2026, Senator Flávio Bolsonaro's party membership was recorded in the TSE system. This prevented Flávio from registering as a candidate of the Liberal Party to stand in the presidential election on 13 August 2026. The senator's campaign alleged fraud in the registration of his party membership and requested an investigation by the Federal Police. Renan Santos claimed that the party had not registered the senator as a member and attributed the registration to a hacker. In a check carried out by the TSE, it was established that the affiliation that prevented the registration of Flávio Bolsonaro's candidacy had not been the result of a hacker attack. According to the TSE, the registration was carried out using the credentials of the Missão Party. On the same day, Minister Nunes Marques ordered the reinstatement of Flávio Bolsonaro's membership of the PL and the removal of his affiliation with Missão.

On 30 August 2026, Dias Toffoli, minister of the Superior Electoral Court, issued a provisional order suspending the digital election campaigning for Renan Santos's presidential ticket, as well as restricting the receipt of funds from the electoral fund and participation in debates. The decision followed the identification of sixteen social media profiles used by the campaign, which were reported to the Electoral Court after the candidacy had been registered. According to Toffoli, the use of these profiles prior to their disclosure could have allowed their content to remain subject to the platforms' recommendation algorithms, unlike profiles that had been duly declared, which could have given the candidacy an advantage. However, the following day, the decision was revoked by Justice Dias Toffoli and the presidential campaign was resumed.

== Ideology ==
According to the party, its main objectives include combating corruption and ending privileges in public service; enforcing law and order, as in toughening criminal and procedural laws and waging war on criminal organizations; prioritizing education and public health; promoting industrialization, especially in the Brazilian Northeast; respecting fiscal responsibility and reducing the size of the state; and combating deforestation and pollution, with an emphasis on sustainability. Party's platform has initially been described as combining elements of economic liberalism and social conservatism, although the party has since then shifted away from the former and emphasized the latter.

Other foundational principles include nationalism and "defense of classical Greco-Roman and Judeo-Christian culture values". Although considering themselves right-wing, they reject the labels of liberals and conservatives, saying "this dichotomy is a 20th century American agenda that does not translate into today's politics". The party declares its opposition to "wokism", stating that social progressivism has gone so far that many liberals "went from supporting gay marriage and legalising drugs to being labelled a fascist because you don't want to use certain pronouns… or are expected to accept that a child can change their gender."

In 2024 the Free Brazil Movement published The Yellow Book, a publication to represent its ideological standpoints; the title makes reference to Mao Zedong's so-called "Little Red Book" and Muammar Gaddafi's Green Book. In it, the movement advocates for some extent of state intervention in the economy and society, contrary to the position it had in the past. Economically, the party advocates "pragmatic, non-dogmatic liberalism" while stating its opposition to "the failure of a childish form of economic liberalism" and economic libertarianism. The party's leader, Santos, has argued that it is naive to expect the economy to fix itself through privatization and deregulation. Instead, the party calls for an economic model where "state must be present in many areas" and proposed reducing government's influence over state-owned firms such as Petrobras instead of privatizing them.

In an interview about the The Yellow Book, Santos stated that the party wants to "reject the absurdity called Bolsonaro", propose a pragmatic discourse that goes beyond the left-right spectrum, and develop a program based on "structural axes": development of the Northeast, slum eradication, elimination of criminal factions, and increased productivity. The party sees the anti-crime policies of El Salvador and industrialization of Vietnam as examples to learn from.

== Notable members ==
- Renan Santos
- Kim Kataguiri
- Arthur do Val
- Guto Zacarias

== Election results ==
=== Presidential ===
| Election year | 1st round | | | |
| Election year | Candidate | Running mate | # of overall votes | % of overall vote |
|---|---|---|---|---|
| 2026 | Renan Santos | Aroldo Medina | 2,675,878 | 2.24% (#4) |

=== Legislative elections ===
| Election | Chamber of Deputies | | | | Federal Senate | | | | Role in government |
| Election | Votes | % | Seats | +/– | Votes | % | Seats | +/– | Role in government |
|---|---|---|---|---|---|---|---|---|---|
| 2026 | 1,223,569 | 1.08% | 1 / 513 | New | 684,138 | 0.33% | 0 / 81 | New | Opposition |

=== Local offices ===
| Election year | Candidate | Office | # of votes | % of vote | Elected? |
|---|---|---|---|---|---|
| 2026 | João Busnello | Governor of Rio de Janeiro | 84,889 | 0.98% | No |

== See also ==
- List of political parties in Brazil

== Notes ==
| Preceded by 13 – WP (PT) | Numbers of Brazilian Official Political Parties; 14 – Mission (Missão) | Succeeded by 15 – BDM (MDB) |
