= 2015–16 protests in Brazil =

Anti-government protests against Dilma Rousseff

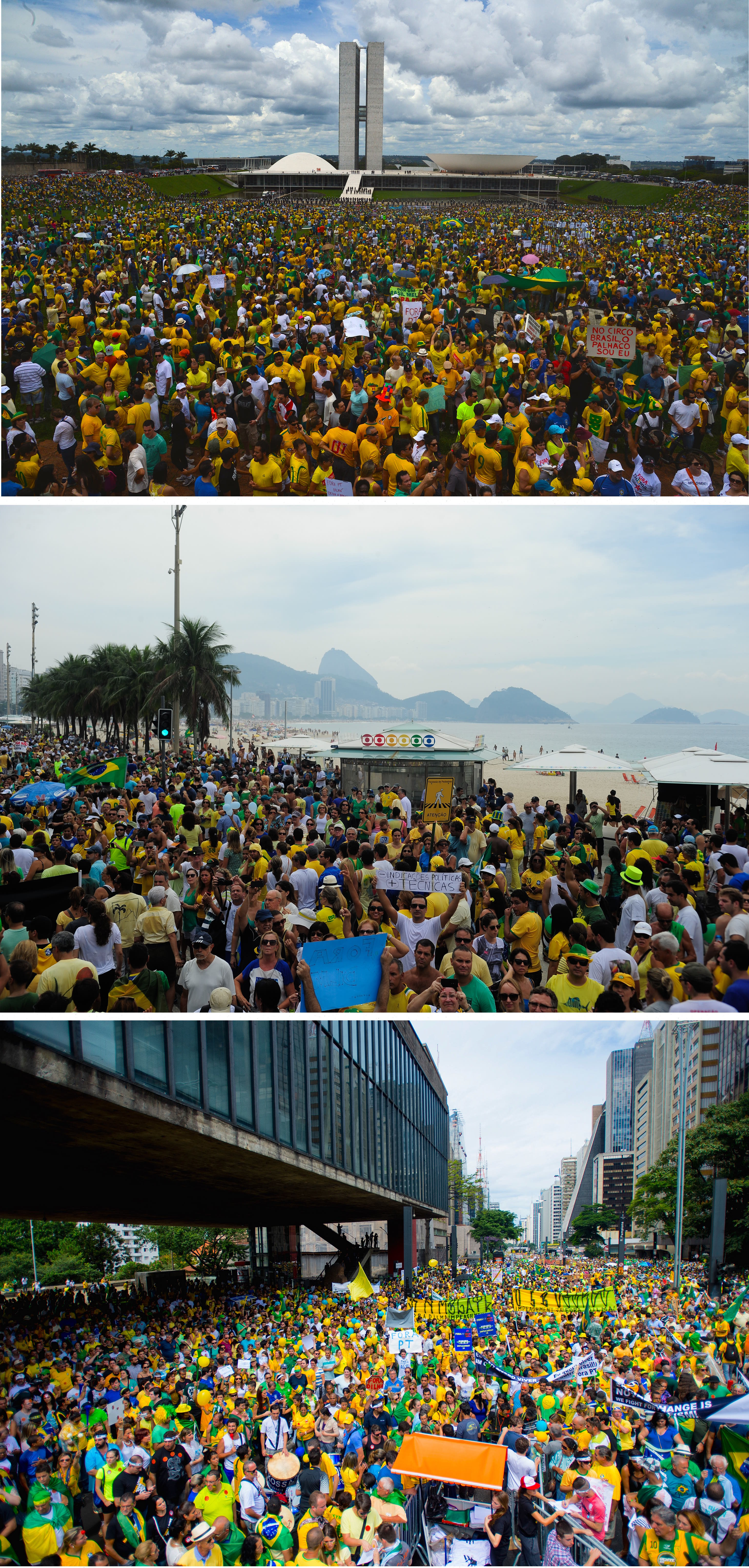
- Top: Demonstration in Brasília outside the National Congress Building; Middle: Thousands protesting on Copacabana Beach in Rio de Janeiro; Bottom: Demonstration on Paulista Avenue in downtown São Paulo
- Date: 15 March 2015 – 31 July 2016; 2015; 15 March 2015, 12 April 2015, 16 August 2015, 13 December 2015; 2016; 13 March 2016, 16 March 2016, 17 April 2016, 31 July 2016
- Location: Brazil: 160 cities in 26 states and the Federal District; Worldwide: six cities
- Caused by: Presidency of Dilma Rousseff; Corruption, particularly the Petrobras scandal; Fiscal adjust reforms; Low economic growth and Economic crisis; Negligence of public funds
- Goals: Impeachment or resignation of Dilma Rousseff; End of corruption; Political Reform; Arrest of those involved in the Petrobras scandal
- Result: President Rousseff impeached and removed from office; Michel Temer becomes president

Parties
Brazilian Democratic Movement Party (PMDB) Rousseff opponents: Free Brazil Movement; Outraged Online; Come to the Streets (VPR); Movement Straighten Brazil; Movement In the Streets; Order of Attorneys of Brazil; Opposition politicians; Sympathizers: SD; DEM; PSP; PSDB	Workers' Party; Supported by: Communist Party of Brazil; Central Única dos Trabalhadores; Landless Workers' Movement; National Union of Students

Lead figures
Michel Temer (Vice President of Brazil) Others: (Brazil) Jair Bolsonaro; (Brazil) Romero Jucá; (Brazil) Eduardo Cunha; (Brazil) Renan Calheiros; (Brazil) Fábio Ostermann; (Brazil) Renan Santos; (Brazil) Fernando Holiday; (Brazil) Kim Kataguiri; (Brazil) Marcello Reis; (Brazil) Bia Kicis; (Brazil) Rogério Chequer; (Brazil) Colin Butterfield; (Brazil) Guilherme Steagall; (Brazil) Rodrigo Chade; (Brazil) Ricardo Salles; (Brazil) Carla Zambelli; (Brazil) Carmelo Neto; Claudio Lamachia	Dilma Rousseff (President of Brazil) Others: Luiz Inácio Lula da Silva; Rui Falcão; Luciana de Oliveira Santos; Renato Rabelo; Vagner Freitas; Gleisi Hoffmann; Carina Vitral; Virgínia Barros

Number
15 March 2015; ~ 1,000,000 – 3,000,000 12 April 2015; ~ 696,000 – 1,500,000 16 August 2015; ~ 900,000 13 December 2015; ~ 83,000 – 407,000 13 March 2016; ~ 1,400,000 – 6,900,000 16 March 2016 +10,000 17 April 2016; 318,000 – 1,300,000 31 July 2016 44,000 – 151,000	13 March 2015; 33,000 – 175,000 16 December 2015; 98,000 – 292,000 18 March 2016 275,000 – 1,300,000	

Casualties
- Injuries: 3
- Arrested: 20

In 2015 and 2016, a series of protests in Brazil denounced corruption and the government of President Dilma Rousseff, triggered by revelations that numerous politicians allegedly accepted bribes connected to contracts at state-owned energy company Petrobras between 2003 and 2010 and connected to the Workers' Party, while Rousseff chaired the company's board of directors. The first protests on 15 March 2015 numbered between one and nearly three million protesters against the scandal and the country's poor economic situation. In response, the government introduced anti-corruption legislation. A second day of major protesting occurred 12 April, with turnout, according to GloboNews, ranging from 696,000 to 1,500,000. On 16 August, protests took place in 200 cities in all 26 states of Brazil. Following allegations that Rousseff's predecessor, Luiz Inácio Lula da Silva, participated in money laundering and a prosecutor ordered his arrest, record numbers of Brazilians protested against the Rousseff government on 13 March 2016, with nearly 7 million citizens demonstrating.

On 12 May 2016, the Federal Senate temporarily suspended Rousseff until it reached a verdict and replaced her with Vice President Michel Temer.

== Background ==
In 2015, approval ratings for President Dilma Rousseff dropped to record lows due to a slowing economy, increasing unemployment, a weakening currency and rising inflation. Upper-class Brazilians stated that Rousseff could not manage the Brazilian economy. They also said that she used class tensions to benefit her political campaign by stating that her political opponents were "enemies of the poor," when, in fact, the poor felt betrayed because she had passed policies to avoid an investment-grade downgrade, which ended up supposedly hurting lower-class Brazilians.

=== Corruption ===
==== Operation Car Wash ====
In February 2014, an investigation by Brazilian Federal Police called "Operation Car Wash" implicated the state-owned energy company Petrobras at the center of what became the largest corruption scandal in Brazil's history. On 14 November 2014, police raids in six states netted prominent Brazilian politicians and businessmen, including some Petrobras directors. They were investigated in regards to "suspicious" contracts worth $22 billion. When allegations surfaced of graft while President Rousseff was part of the board of directors of Petrobras between 2003 and 2010; Brazilians became upset with the government and called for Rousseff's impeachment. No evidence that Rousseff herself was involved in the scheme has been found, and she denies any prior knowledge of it. Further investigation found various offshore accounts and art collections owned by those involved in the scandal.

In March 2015, Brazil's Supreme Court ruled that prosecutors could investigate about 50 individuals, most belonging to the Workers' Party, for possible bribery and other crimes at Petrobras. Brazilian lawmakers allegedly squirreled away millions of dollars for themselves and for their political campaigns. On 16 March 2015, prosecutors charged 27 people in the Petrobras scandal, including Workers' Party treasurer João Vaccari Neto and Renato Duque, former head of services of Petrobras. Neto was charged with corruption and money laundering, possibly related to illegal campaign donations supposedly solicited from Duque. Duque was arrested and denied "having money abroad or moving money abroad". On 15 April 2015, Neto was arrested at his São Paulo home. The Workers' Party charged that Neto's arrest was politically motivated.

==== Lula da Silva allegations ====
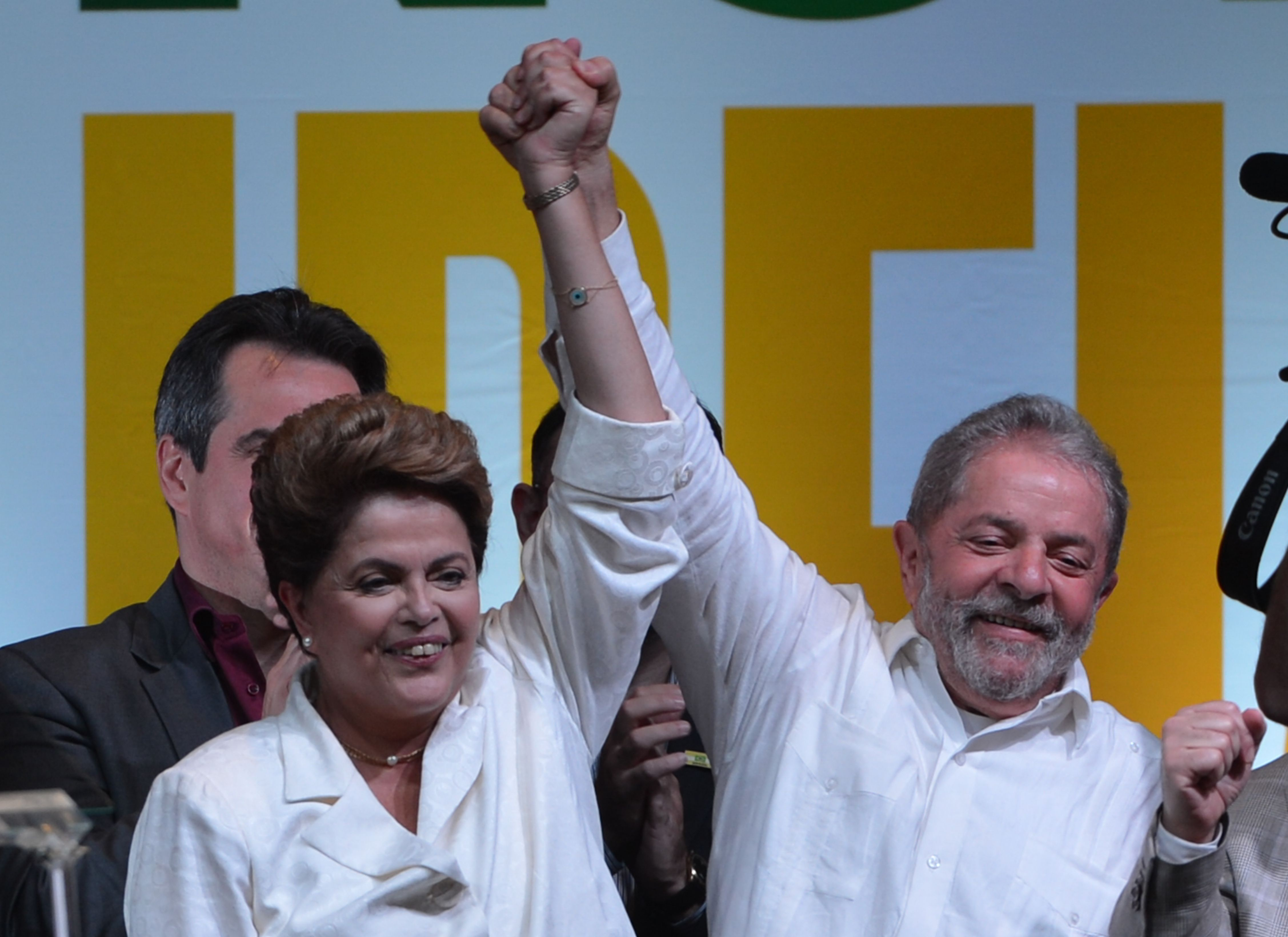
Millions of Brazilians continued protests against Rousseff (left) into 2016 following allegations that her predecessor, Luiz Inácio Lula da Silva (right), was involved in money laundering.

On 4 March 2016, Federal Police raided the home of Rousseff's predecessor, Luiz Inácio Lula da Silva following corruption charges against him. A subsequent indictment accused Lula of money laundering and misrepresentation, with many of the allegations surrounding a luxury beachfront home that he hadn't disclosed that he owned, which had recent, costly additions. He faces ten years in prison if convicted. Investigators believed that this and another country house were possibly involved in the Petrobras scandal, and investigated further into donations made to his Lula Foundation. The link has not however yet been demonstrated.

Protests against Lula protégée Dilma Rousseff began again on 14 March 2016.

On 15 March 2016, testimony by the former leader of the Workers' Party stated that Lula and Rousseff had tried to block the Petrobras investigation and alleged that Aécio Neves, head of the Brazilian Social Democracy Party (PSDB) and a member of the Federal Senate, might be involved. The next day, Rousseff appointed Lula as her chief of staff, allegedly because ministers and lawmakers can only be tried by Brazil's Supreme Court. Judge Sergio Moro released a recorded phone call from Rousseff to Lula. The Supreme Court said the wiretap had been illegal, because it alone could authorize a wiretap involving the president, and one Supreme Court justice called the appointment an attempt to impede the investigation.

The phone call between Rousseff and Lula da Silva went as follows:

Rousseff: Lula, let me tell you something.

Lula da Silva: Tell me, my dear.

Rousseff: It’s this, I am sending [Jorge] Messias round with the papers, so that we have them, just in case of necessity, that is the terms of office, right?

Lula da Silva: Uh-huh. Ok, ok.

Rousseff: That’s all, wait there, he is heading there.

Lula da Silva: OK, I’m here. I’ll wait.

Tens of thousands of Brazilians protested nationwide the night after the recorded call was released, with some violence reported.

==== Allegations of PMDB involvement ====
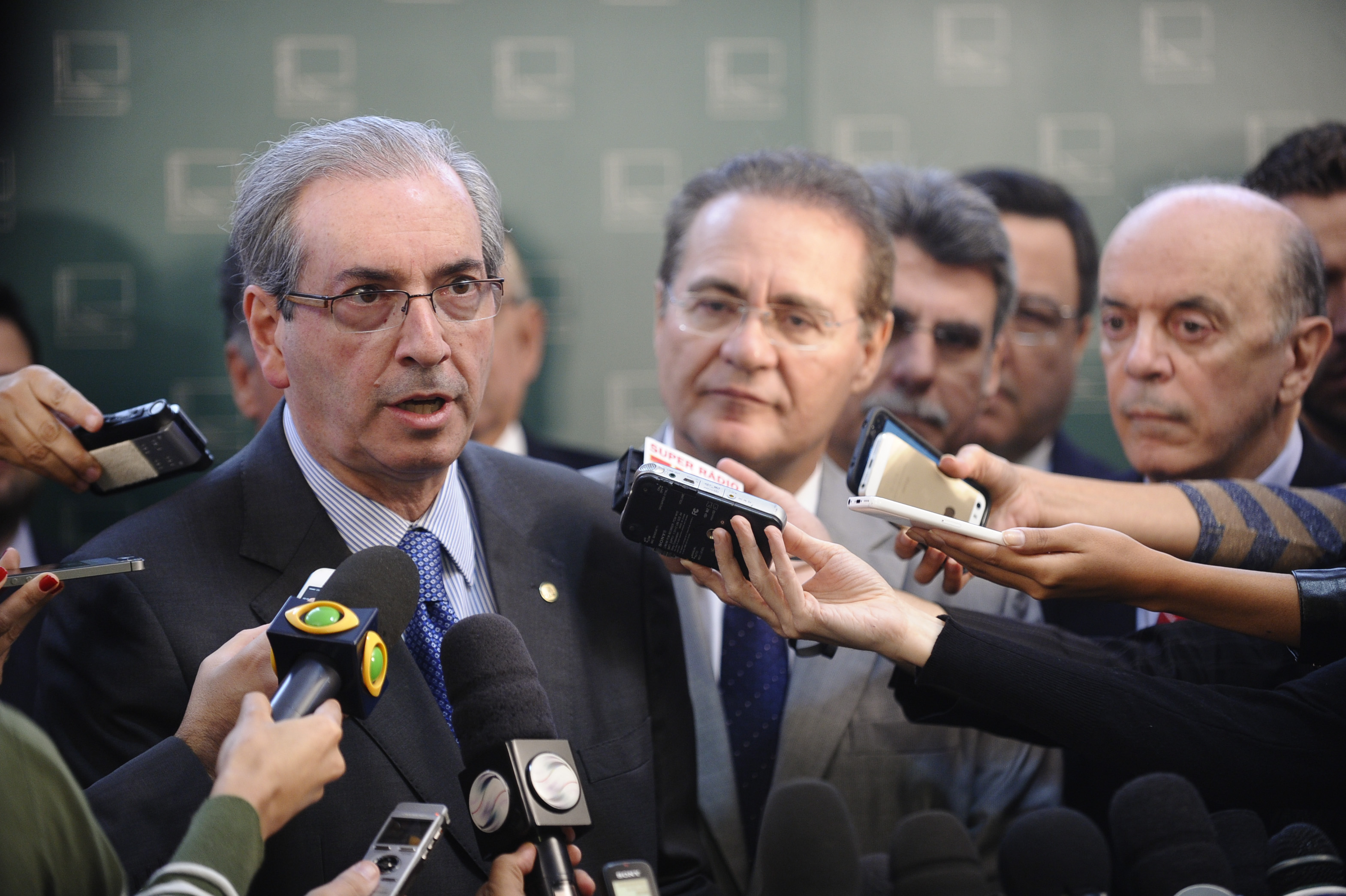
Eduardo Cunha (left) at a press conference with fellow PMDB member Renan Calheiros (middle) on 21 May 2015.

As investigations grew, allegations against members of the Brazilian Democratic Movement Party (PMDB) began to arise. Vice President Michel Temer faced impeachment proceedings in December 2015 but his fellow party member, President of the Chamber of Deputies Eduardo Cunha, defended Temer and blocked the motion. Cunha, however, did grant impeachment proceedings against President Rousseff at the time. Months later in April 2016, a Supreme Court judge, Judge Mello, ruled Cunha's actions wrong and that Temer should face impeachment proceedings as well. Cunha, who would be third in line for the presidency, has also faced scrutiny for alleged money laundering through the Petrobras scandal. Fourth in line, the President of the Senate of Brazil and fellow party member of PMDB, Renan Calheiros, is also under investigation for his alleged involvement in the scandal as well.

On 5 May 2016, Cunha was suspended as speaker of the lower house by Brazil's Supreme Court due to allegations that he attempted to intimidate members of Congress, and obstructed investigations into his alleged receipt of bribes.

=== Economy ===
According to Bloomberg Businessweek, "[t]he real strengthened 0.6 percent to 3.2304 per dollar and has fallen 17.7 percent this year", the largest drop in value among "major currencies". Bloomberg Businessweek also noted that Rousseff's government had raised taxes and slowed spending to avoid a credit rating downgrade "after years of ballooning spending and subsidized lending", that economic growth had stalled and that "inflation exceeds the ceiling of the target range". The Petrobras scandal hurt the economy by causing a slowdown in investment in energy and construction.

== Demonstrations ==
=== 2015 ===
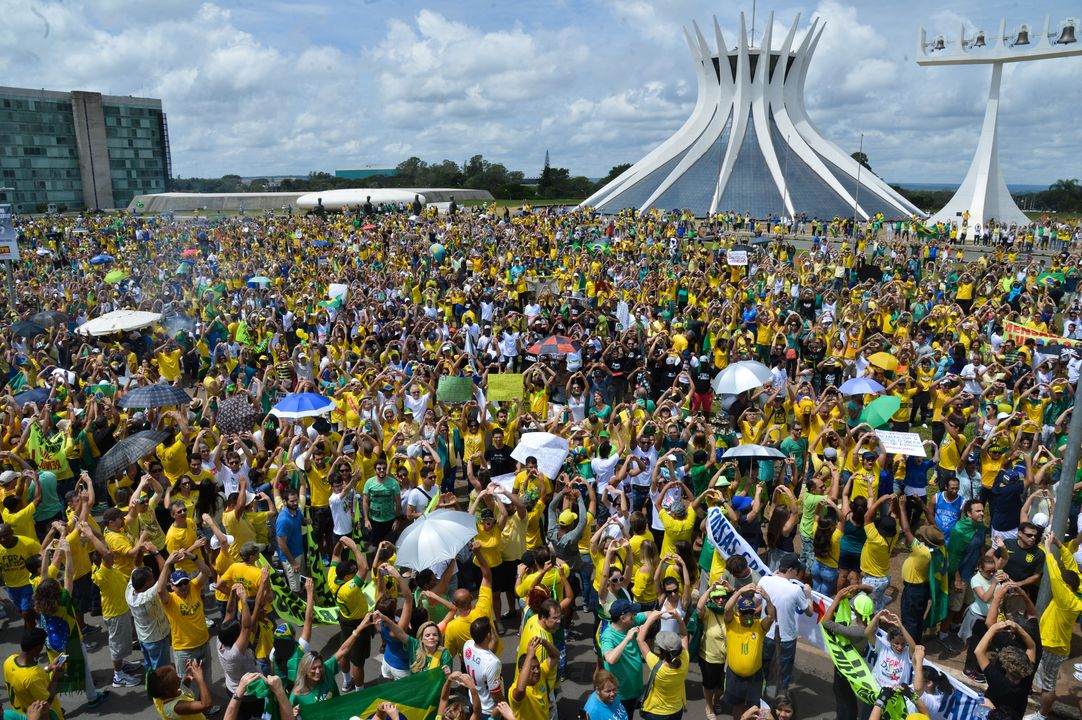
A demonstration in Brasília outside of the Cathedral of Brasília.

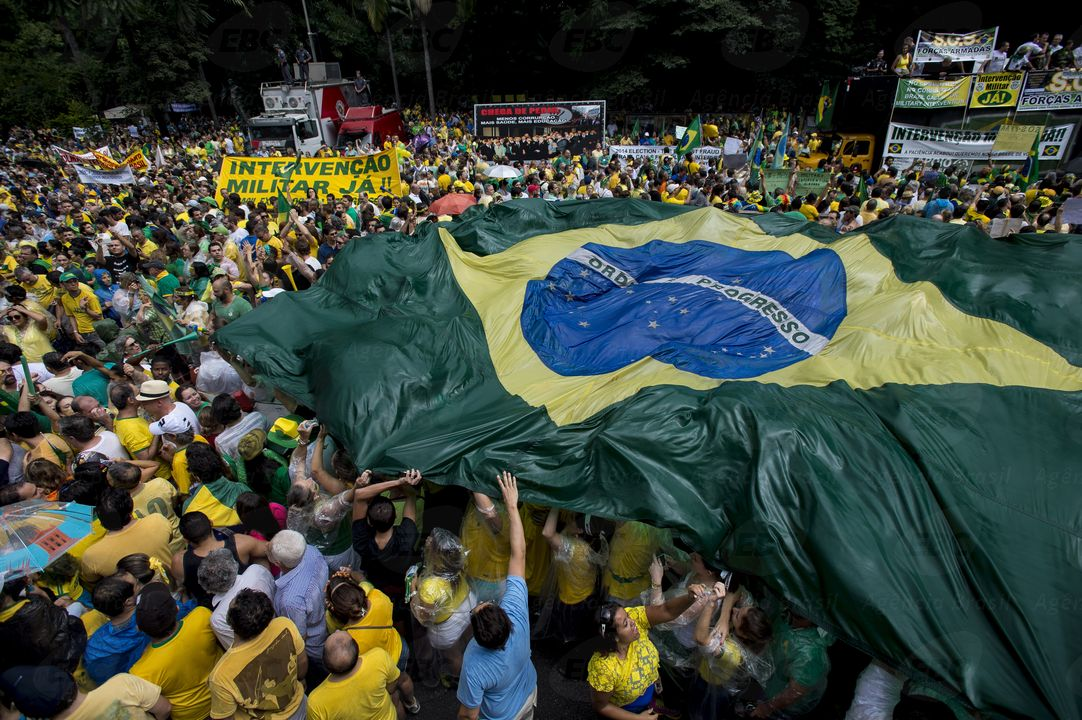
Protesters in São Paulo with a large Brazilian flag.

On 13 March, thousands of supporters of the Workers' Party gathered in support of Rousseff and Petrobras in cities around Brazil. Police said that about 33,000 participated in the protests; pro-government organizers said 175,000 demonstrated. On 15 March, protests again broke out across Brazil. Although crowd size estimates differ, most calculations put the number at roughly one million nationwide.

Police estimated the number at 2.4 million and organizers at three million, with hundreds of thousands to over a million demonstrators in São Paulo, about 50,000 in Brasília and thousands in other cities, with many protesters wearing yellow and green clothing similar to the Brazil football team and Brazilian flag. In São Paulo, police stated that at the start of the protest, there were approximately 580,000 demonstrators but the numbers grew by about 4,000 people every two minutes, with an estimated final number of over 1.5 million demonstrators. Datafolha estimated a different number of protesters, stating that 210,000 demonstrators protested at some point and that 188,000 did so at the same time. On Copacabana beach in Rio de Janeiro, thousands protested and collected signatures directed at impeaching President Rousseff. The protest occurred on the 30th anniversary of the restoration of Brazil to democracy after military dictatorship. Some demonstrators called for military intervention against Rousseff, others for impeachment.

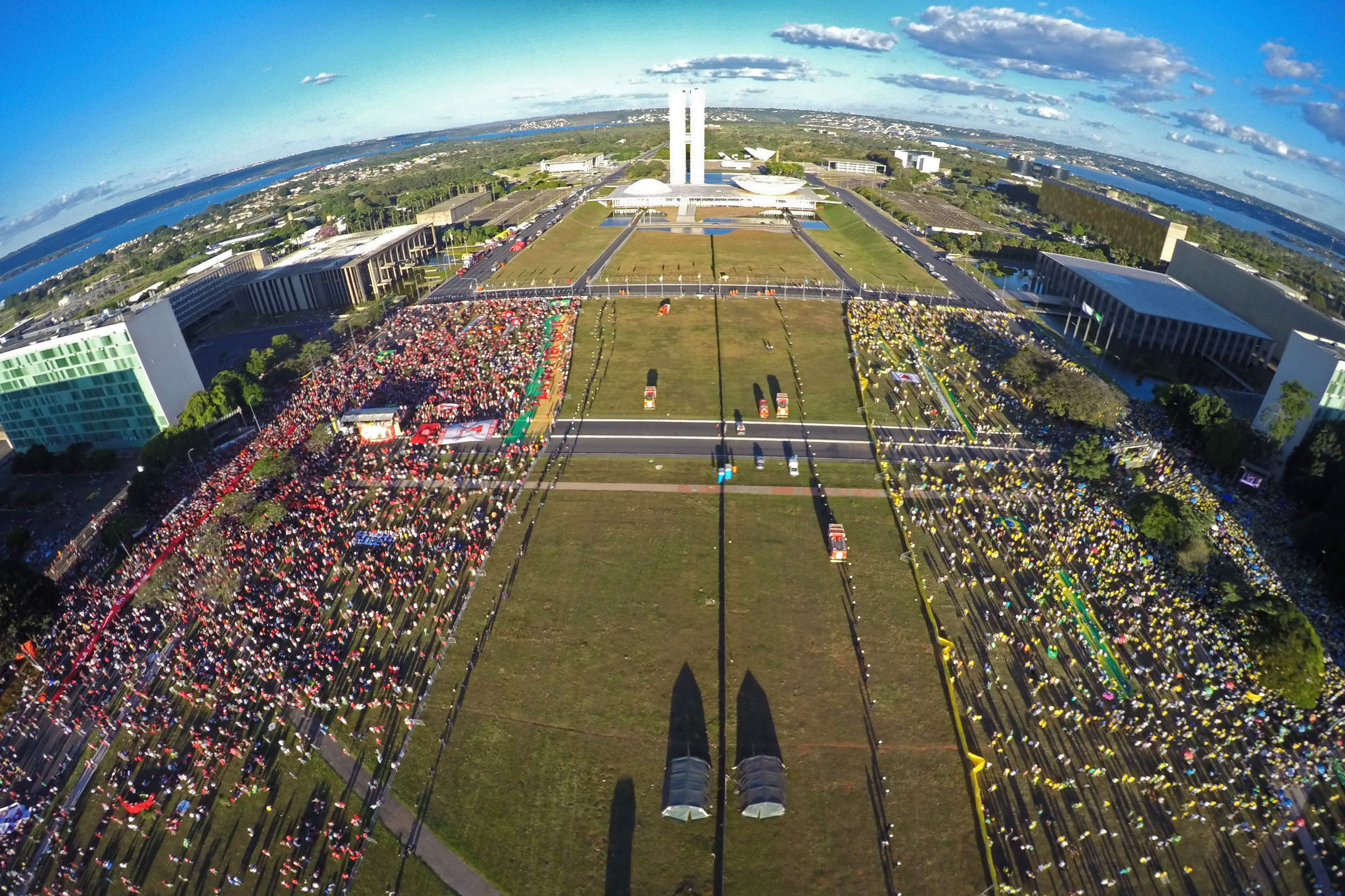
Anti-impeachment (left) and pro-impeachment (right) camps protest on the 17th of April.

Brazilians protested again on 12 April. Police said about 696,000 people came out, while protest organizers stated there were 1,500,000 demonstrators. In São Paulo, protesters were numbered between 275,000 by police and 1,000,000 by organizers. In Rio de Janeiro on Copacabana Beach, there were fewer demonstrators than at the 15 March protests but several thousand protesters still demonstrated. and sang rock songs that dated back to protests against the former Brazilian military dictatorship. The protesters believed that Rousseff knew about the corruption and demanded she step down or called for her impeachment. Analysts said that the smaller turnout could show that the protests would eventually come to a halt and the movement would end. Protest organizers combated such statements saying that the movement had spread to smaller cities in Brazil compared to 15 March protests.

On 15 April, labor organizations protested a law that permitted companies to treat workers as independent contractors, and protests spreading through 19 Brazilian states with demonstrators blocking roads.

Fieldwork using quantitative methods conducted in the 12 April protests by researchers based at the University of São Paulo in the city of São Paulo, and by Universidade Federal de Minas Gerais professors in Belo Horizonte noted the specific profile of the protesters. In São Paulo, they were largely very high-income, mostly white, with a great mistrust of political parties, especially those on the left, but with a strong belief in Aécio Neves, the defeated candidate in the 2014 national elections, and revealed a preference for ultra-conservative political journalism, and the belief that the Workers' Party intended to implement a communist regime in Brazil. In Belo Horizonte, protesters identified themselves mostly as centrist or right-wing in their political beliefs; supporting the idea that the federal government's distributive policies and favoring her resignation or impeachment. A call for military intervention was the third most frequent response. A majority of protesters agreed that military intervention was needed when asked that question in a yes or no format.

Subsequent protests occurred on 16 August and on 13 December.

=== 2016 ===
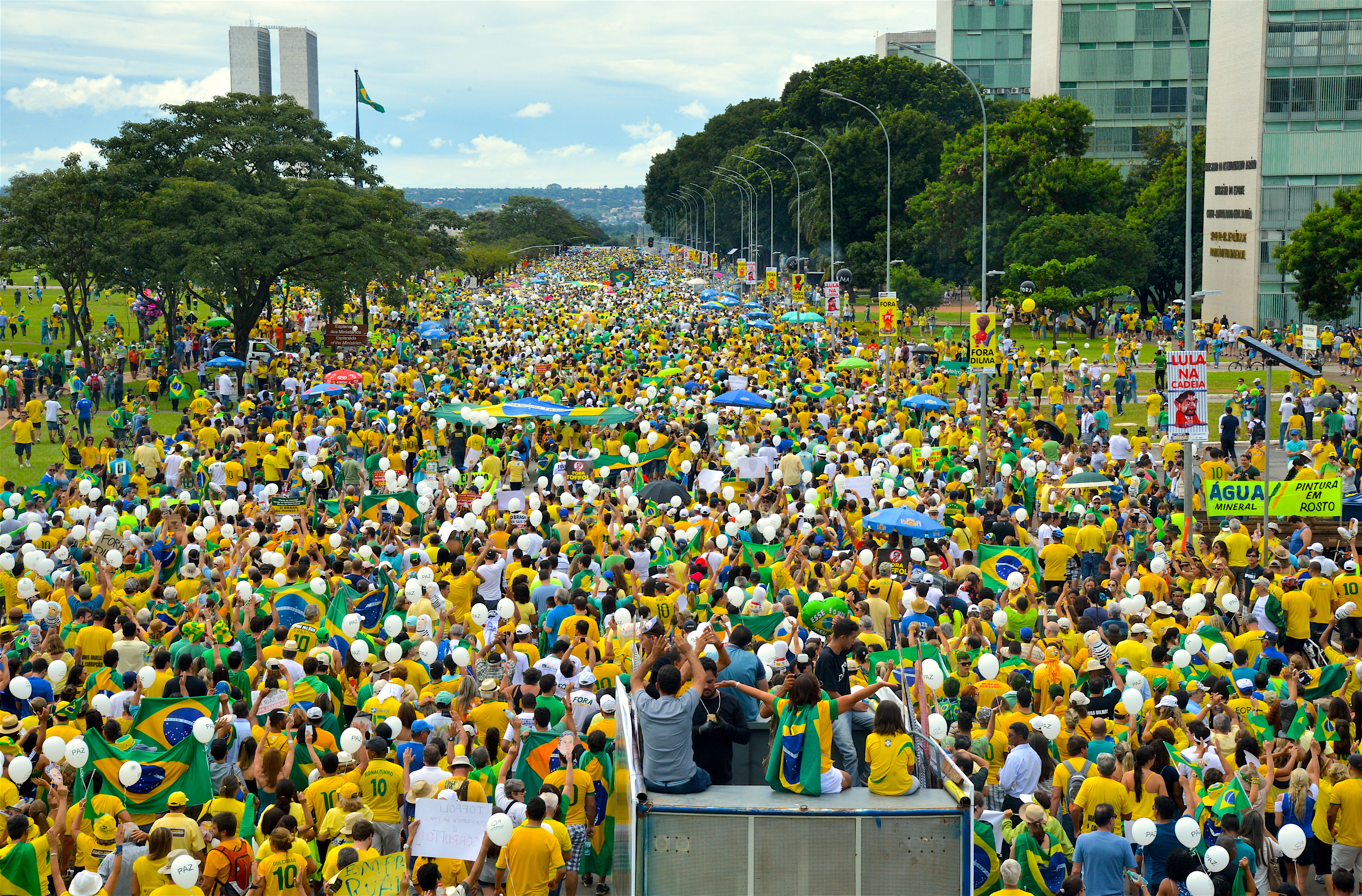
Thousands of protesters march en route to the National Congress building in Brasilia on 13 March 2016.

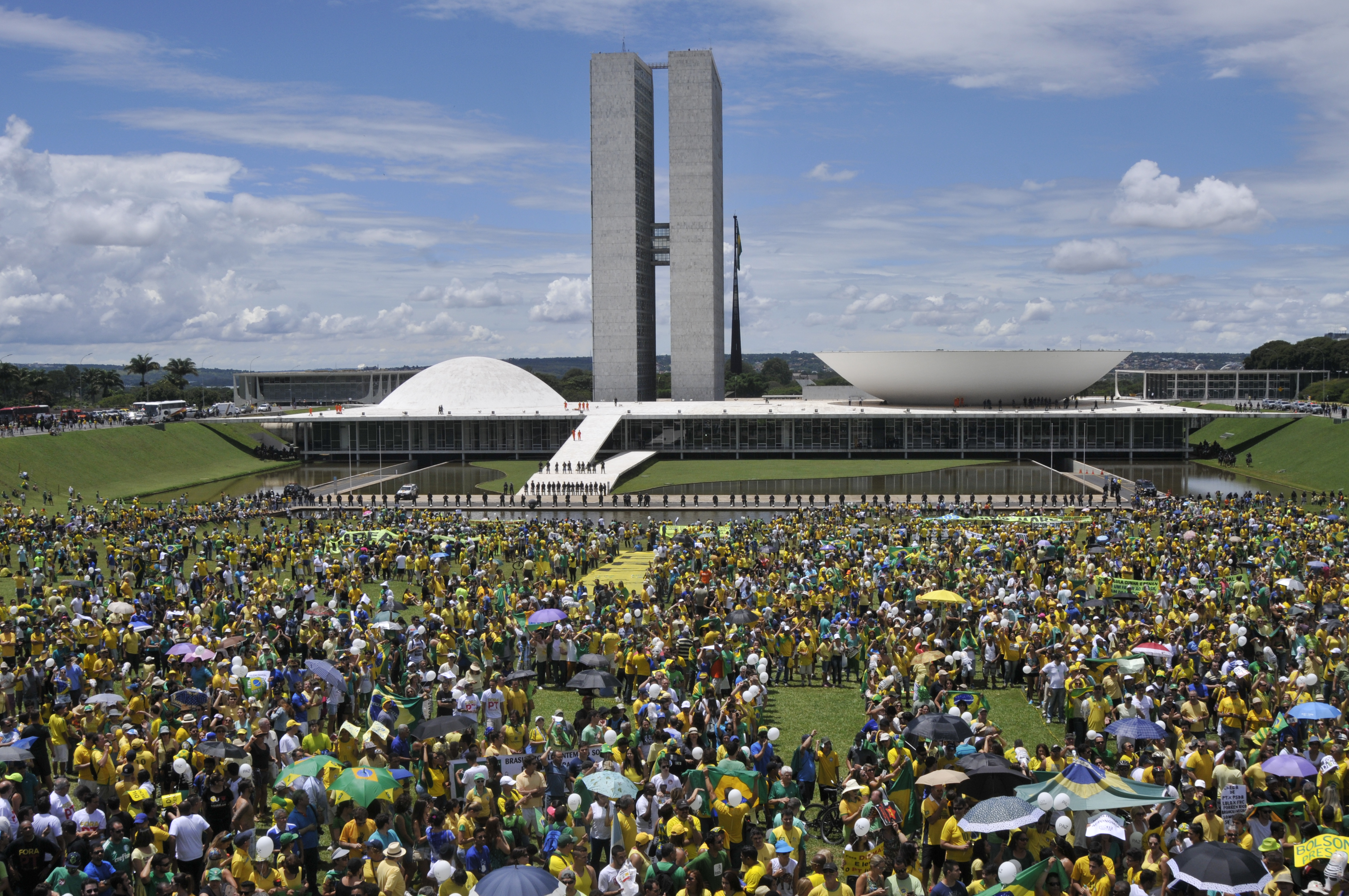
Demonstration in front of the National Congress.

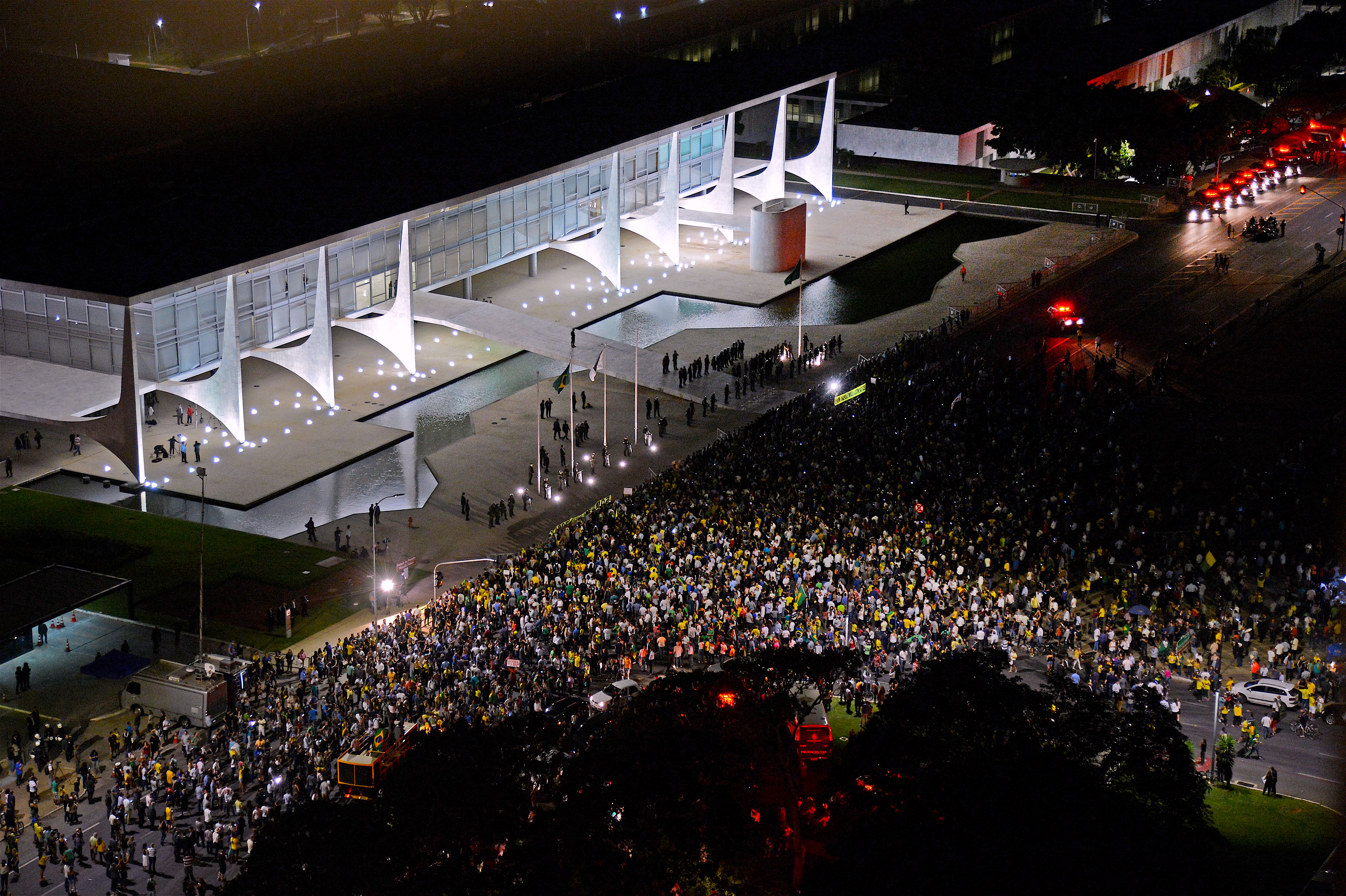
Thousands of Brazilians protesting outside Palácio do Planalto, the presidential palace, on 16 March 2016.

Between 5.6 and 6.9 million Brazilians protested nationwide on 13 March 2016 calling for the arrest of her predecessor Luiz Inácio Lula da Silva's on money laundering charges and more specifically, for Dilma's impeachment. Protests in 337 municipalities, from the jungle town of Manaus to the capital city of Brasilia, demanded Rousseff's resignation. In São Paulo alone, approximately 2.5 million protested dressed in Brazil's yellow and green apparel, said police, the largest demonstration in the history of the city. Though the protesters were mainly middle-class, support for Rousseff among the poor has reportedly dropped due to the economy. Balloons depicting Lula da Silva in a striped prison outfit named 'pixuleco' were also seen during the protests.

On 16 March 2016, more protests broke out after Rousseff appointed Lula da Silva as her chief of staff, a move seen as shielding him from investigation, and leaked audio of a call between the two went public. The public, outraged, protested nationwide. In Brasilia, 5,000 people demonstrated outside the presidential palace and were dispersed with pepper spray and stun grenades when they approached the National Congress Palace. In São Paulo, thousands more protested, and another 5,000 in Porto Alegre. Protests reached 18 states.

On 18 March 2016, the Order of Attorneys of Brazil, by 26 votes to 2, decided to support the impeachment of Rousseff based on the opinion of federal advisor Erick Venâncio.

== Reactions ==
=== Government response ===
Rousseff said she defended the right to protest but called the protests a tactic used against her by opposition politicians and business elites. In the week after the 15 March protest, President Rousseff said that she was open to dialogue and that she might have made mistakes in her economic policies.

==== Anti-corruption measures ====
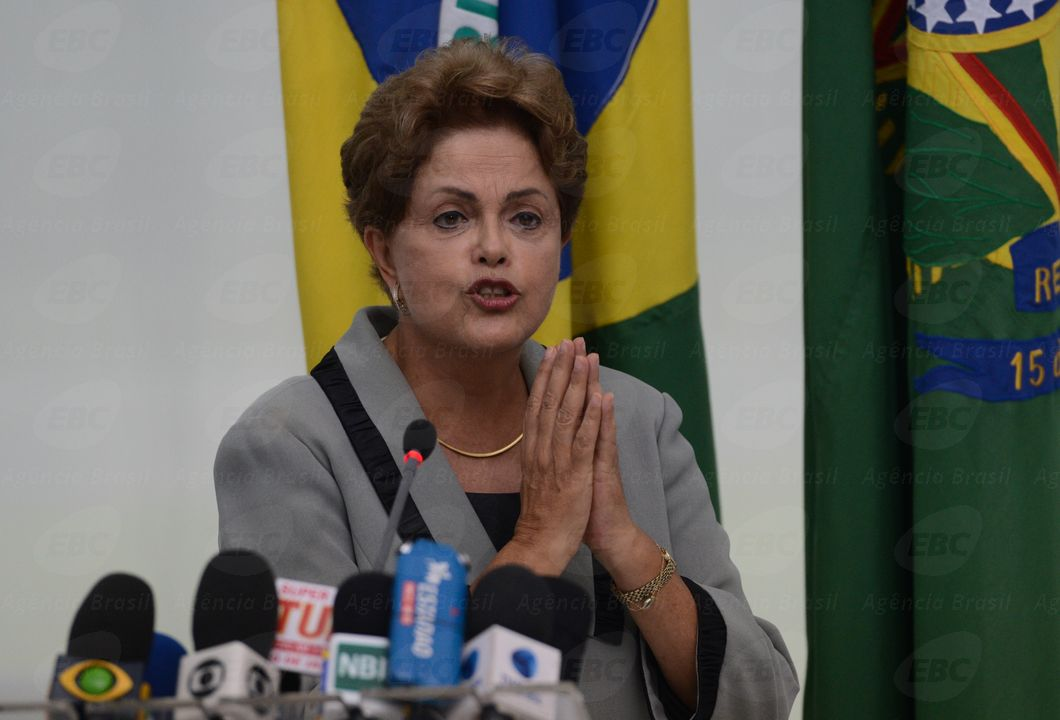
President Rousseff commenting on 15 March 2015 protests.

Following the 15 March protests, the Brazilian government announced that "a package of anti-corruption measures" was on the way, according to Secretary General Miguel Rossetto and Justice Minister Jose Eduardo Cardozo. Cardozo also stated that the government would participate in dialogue and that there should be "a ban on corporate finance of electoral campaigns". On 18 March, President Rousseff introduced the anti-corruption package, which included up to 10 years in prison for individuals convicted of corruption and fines five to ten times the amount of money in any transaction. The package would also included more individuals in all branches of the Brazilian government in the 2010 Ficha Limpa law, which makes an individual ineligible to participate in government for eight years after impeachment, resigning to avoid impeachment or conviction by a judiciary panel.

=== Public opinion ===
In February 2015, before protests began, Rouseff's approval rating dropped 19 points to 23% with 44% disapproving of her in Datafolha polls. Following 15 March protests, Rouseff's approval rating fell even further to only 13% with a 62% disapproval rating, one of the highest disapproval ratings in the past 20 years of any president. Other polls by Datafolha performed on 9 and 10 April showed that 63% believed President Rousseff "should face impeachment proceedings". Less than 15% knew that vice president Michel Temer would become president if Rousseff was impeached.

In CNT/MDA polls performed in March 2015, 10.8% of Brazilians approved of Rouseff's government and 59.7 wanted her impeached. In July 2015, the CNT/MDA showed a lower approval rating of 7.7% and 62.8% of Brazilians wanting her impeachment.

== See also ==
- 2016-2017 South Korean protests
- 2016–2017 Brazilian protests
- List of protests in the 21st century
- List of scandals in Brazil
