= Jakobs =

Jakobs is a German language patronymic surname from the personal name Jakob. Notable people with the name include:

- Cornelia Jakobs (1992), Swedish singer and songwriter
- Ditmar Jakobs (1953), German former footballer
- Gert Jakobs (1964), Dutch former racing cyclist
- Günther Jakobs (1937), German jurist
- Ismail Jakobs (1999), German professional footballer
- Jens Jakobs (1985), Swedish ice hockey player
- Johannes Jakobs (1917–1944), German footballer
- Josef Jakobs (1898–1941), German spy
- Julian Jakobs (1990), German footballer
- Karl Jakobs, German physicist
- Marco Jakobs (1974), German bobsledder
- Michael Jakobs (1959), retired German football player
- Wilhelm Jakobs (1858–1942), German railway engineer and construction advisor
