= Guto =

Guto is a Welsh given name; it can be the diminutive form of Gruffudd, Augusto or Gustavo. Notable persons with that name include:

- Guto Bebb (born 1968), Welsh Conservative MP
- Guto Harri (born 1966), Welsh broadcaster, writer and communications consultant
- Guto Nyth Brân (1700–1737), Welsh athlete
- Guto Pryce (born 1972), bass guitar player in the band Super Furry Animals
- Guto Puw (born 1971), Welsh composer, university lecturer and conductor
- Guto'r Glyn (1435–1493), Welsh language poet
- Guto (footballer, born 1964), full name José Augusto Bagatini, Brazilian football central defender
- Guto (footballer, born 1976), full name Adelton Gomes da Silva, Brazilian football goalkeeper
- Guto (footballer, born 1988), full name Augusto Pacheco Fraga, Brazilian football striker
- Guto Zacarias (born 1999), Brazilian politician
- Carlos Augusto Filho (born 1986), Brazilian mixed martial artist and kickboxer; known as Guto Inocente

== See also ==
- Guto Wayu, one of the 180 woredas in the Oromia Region of Ethiopia
