= Arthur do Val =

Brazilian politician (born 1986)

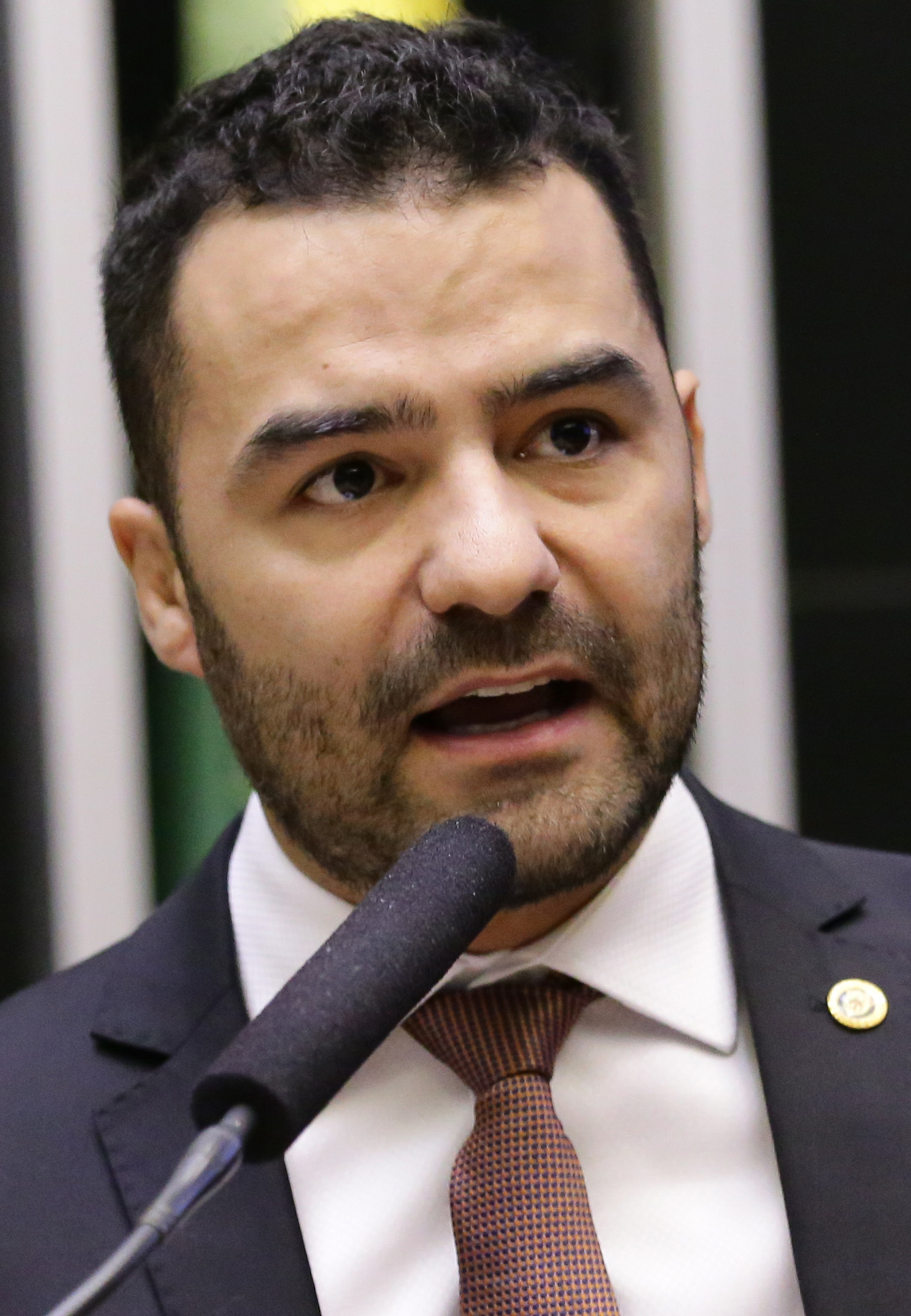

Member of the Legislative Assembly of São Paulo
- In office 15 March 2019 – 20 April 2022
- Constituency: At-large

Personal details
- Born: Arthur Moledo do Val; 21 August 1986 (age 40) São Paulo, Brazil
- Party: Mission (since 2025)
- Other political affiliations: DEM (2018–19); Patriota (2020–22); PODE (2022); UNIÃO (2022–2025)
- Occupation: Cyberactivist; Entrepreneur; Politician; YouTuber

YouTube information
- Channel: Mamaefalei
- Years active: 2015–present
- Genres: Documentary; Political commentary
- Subscribers: 2.68 million
- Views: 799 million
- Last updated: August 4, 2026

Arthur Moledo do Val (born 21 August 1986 in São Paulo) is a Brazilian politician, activist member of Free Brazil Movement, YouTuber and entrepreneur. In the 2018 Brazilian general election, he was elected State Deputy of São Paulo as member of Democrats (DEM), being the second most voted with 478,280 votes, after Janaína Paschoal. do Val ran for mayor of São Paulo in the 2020 election.

He is a defender of mostly classical liberal ideas and uses his channel MamãeFalei on YouTube to spread political news and opinions among his followers, which are more than 2.5 million subscribers.

In 2022 he announced his run for governor of the State of São Paulo, but withdrew after he had private audios leaked to the public in which he made sexually explicit comments towards female Ukrainian refugees while on a visit to a refugee camp during the Russian invasion. In one audio he stated “they are easy because they are poor”. He resigned his state deputy seat on April after the legislative assembly voted for starting the process of his removal. The Legislative Assembly concluded the process in favor of his removal, making him ineligible to run for office for 8 years.

== Biography ==
The activist says that his question regarding the Brazilian economy and politics began in his younger years, inspiring him to create the channel "Mamãefalei" in June 2015. In the same period, protests were supporting former President Luiz Inácio Lula da Silva as Chief of Staff of Brazil. Arthur took the opportunity to expose one of the main points of his job in the following year, in 2016, which would include the criticism to the blind political militancy. The video was well received by the public and had a start point for his career as an activist. The format of his videos which he went to political protests (mainly left-wing ones) and questioned protesters about their defended agenda, in an attempt to expose inconsistencies, brought growth to his channel. It began to be well noticed, associating itself to groups like Free Brazil Movement (MBL) and, along with the movement, received the Boletim da Liberdade Award, of the homonymous newspaper, in 2017; subscribers of the newspaper also voted for the winner's election.

Between June and July 2016, Arthur met the MBL coordinators, beginning to produce content and militate as a member.

In June 2018, Arthur went to the Chamber of Deputies, talking about fake news and MBL accusations, as well as the request of Supreme Court Justice Luiz Fux for an investigation about fake news. Fux has cited an USP study, citing the MBL as a fake news spreader. Arthur said that such a study didn't exist and asked for Fux's presence, saying that he would be involved with important questions such as the unconditional right given to the public service. Arthur concluded his speech with the following words:

What I propose here is that we should stop the demagogy, stop the authoritarian speech of the thought patrol! "We're gonna patrol WhatsApp; we're gonna regulate I don't know what..." I think there will be someone wanting to regulate the thinking or the bar talk with your friend. Just let people mature by themselves, as it always was in society, and we will naturally fight fake news. No one wants to share fake news. No one wants to be ashamed of spreading fake information. And that's what we need to trust more than in a bureaucrat with a pen.

On 23 August 2019, Arthur stated he would leave Democrats to run for Mayor of São Paulo in the 2020 election.

On 19 November 2019, Arthur was expelled from Democrats.

In February 2020, do Val, along with the elite of the Free Brazil Movement, joined the party Patriota (PATRI) and reaffirmed his intentions to run for Mayor of São Paulo.

== Controversies ==
=== Confrontation with Ciro Gomes ===
One June 2018, during the recording of one of his videos in Fórum da Liberdade, Arthur approached the then pre-candidate for President Ciro Gomes, questioning him about a statement which the politician said he would "receive Moro's gang with bullets", a reference to the then-judge Sergio Moro. After that, he was hit in the head with a slap from Ciro. Arthur ironized the former Governor asking, "Do you think I'm Patrícia Pillar so you can hit me?" Arthur persisted: "He's weak! Weak! See? Ciro Gomes hit me in the head. Do you think you're in Northeast, Ciro?"

The confrontation generated repercussion. Thais Bilenky, writing for Folha de S. Paulo, considered that, in the act, Ciro touched the activist's neck, alleging that it's not possible to measure the intensity of the supposed slap. Ciro commented the fact to Folha saying "Do you think if I had hit him, there wouldn't have a mark? As the way I am? I said 'Don't be an asshole, man' and left". A specialist in micro facial expressions and body language, Vitor Santos, analysed the footage of the incident, dismissed the hypothesis of manipulation on the video of the struggle, and concluded that do Val was really assaulted.

=== Trip to Ukraine in March 2022 ===
In early March 2022 do Val travelled to Ukraine during the Russian invasion of the country and sent an audio message in which he said that Ukrainian women "are easy because they are poor". In the same audio he also said that "Ukrainian women are gold diggers (...) but look like goddesses...like, if they shit you can clean up their asses with your tongue". His girlfriend, Giulia Blagitz, ended their relationship as a result. CNN Brazil, among others, disseminated the contents of the audio. The site UOL.com, also confirmed that do Val said that "Ukrainian women are easy because they are poor". The MBL claimed to be analyzing the audio and did not deny that the voice in the audio was do Val's. On March 5, 2022, do Val acknowledged that the voice was indeed his and said that "it was my mistake caused by a moment of excitement". Damares Alves, Minister for Family, Women and Human Rights and other São Paulo State Parliamentarians called for do Val's immediate resignation. Over 40,000 people signed a petition calling for him to be expelled from the Legislative Assembly of São Paulo.

Court case with the Genros

Do Val was ordered to pay Fernando Genro R$30,000 in September 2022 as compensation for misleading news connected to the charge that had been made in 2017, where Do Val verbally attacked Luciana Genro and her family and accused Fernando of stealing R$30,000.

== Personal life ==
Arthur do Val is a casual motocross racer and a fan of the band Angra. He is a close friend of politician and DotA player Kim Kataguiri.

== See also ==
- Kim Kataguiri
- Fernando Holiday
- Free Brazil Movement

Party political offices
New political party	PATRI nominee for Mayor of São Paulo; 2020	Most recent
