= Carina Vitral =

Brazilian politician

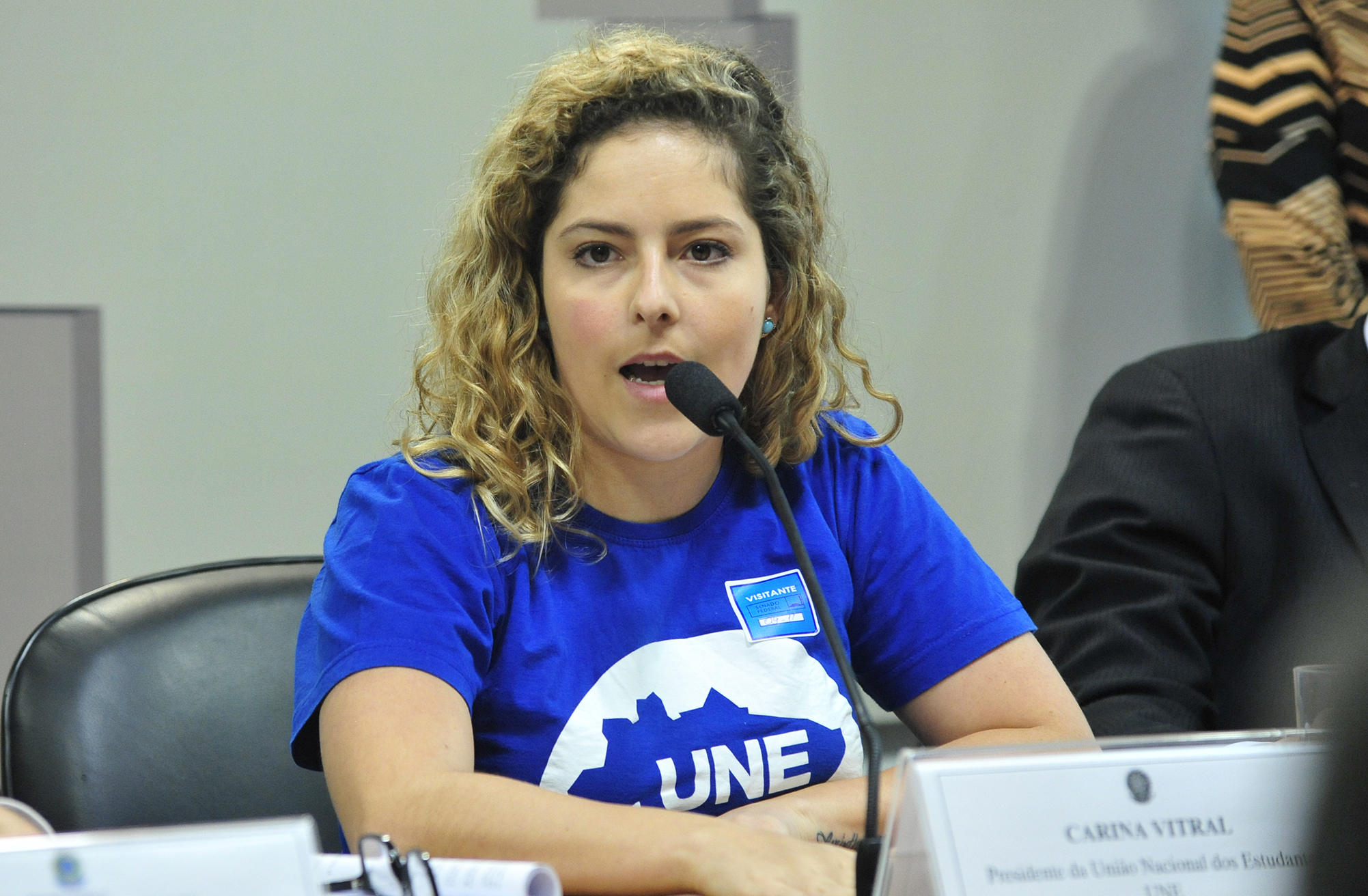

President of the National Union of Students
- In office 7 June 2015 – 18 June 2017
- Preceded by: Virgínia Barros
- Succeeded by: Marianna Dias

Personal details
- Born: Carina Vitral Costa; 6 July 1988 (age 38) Santos, São Paulo, Brazil
- Party: PCdoB (2016–present)
- Education: Pontifical Catholic University of São Paulo (BEc)
- Profession: Economist, activist

Carina Vitral Costa (born 6 July 1988) is a Brazilian student and activist, member of the Communist Party of Brazil (PCdoB). She had served as president of the National Union of Students (UNE) from 2015 to 2017. Currently, Vitral is advisor to the executive-secretary of the Ministry of Finance.

== Biography ==
In student leadership, Vitral was part of the Socialist Youth Union (UJS). Before assuming office as president of UNE, she was the entity's director of public universities and headed the State Union of Students of São Paulo from 2013 to 2015. Vitral was also member of the Municipal Council of the Youth of Santos.

She was elected president of UNE during the 54th Congress, held in Goiânia, with 58% of the votes, under the coalition "The student movement unified against the regression in defense of the democracy and for more rights". With this election, occurred for the first time in UNE's history, the transition of the presidency between two women: then president Vírginia Barros and Vitral.

During her administration, she headed many protests against the decrease on the age of criminal responsibility and the impeachment of president Dilma Rousseff. Vitral published a study about the violence against students during the military dictatorship, among them the former president of the Union Honestino Guimarães.

During the 2016 elections, Vitral ran for mayor of Santos in a coalition between the Communist Party and the Workers' Party (PT). She received 14,650 votes (6.61% of the valid votes), placing in 2nd place, defeated by incumbent mayor Paulo Alexandre Barbosa (PSDB), who was seeking for re-election. In 2018, she was candidate for the Legislative Assembly of São Paulo, receiving 33,006 votes (0.16% of the valid votes), being the party's first substitute. In 2022, Vitral was once again candidate for the Assembly, receiving 20,768 votes (0.09% of the valid votes), failing to get elected.

Educational offices
Preceded by Virgínia Barros	President of the National Union of Students; 2015–2017	Succeeded by Marianna Dias
