= Flow Podcast =

Brazilian podcast

Flow Podcast is a Brazilian podcast created by Bruno Monteiro Aiub (Monark), Igor Rodrigues Coelho (Igor 3K), and Gianluca Santana Eugenio (Gianzão) in 2018. The podcast is directed and produced by Gianluca Eugenio (Gianzão). It is known for its variety of guests, which include politicians, digital influencers, among many others. It is one of the most watched podcasts in Brazil, with more than 5 million subscribers on YouTube.

On 8 February 2022, the podcast's producer, Estúdios Flow, fired Aiub after he made statements in support of a Nazi political party in Brazil that was considered to be anti-Semitic.

== History ==
Before creating the podcast, Bruno Monteiro Aiub (Monark), a Brazilian of Syrian and Lebanese descent, and Igor Coelho (Igor 3K) had their respective video game channels on YouTube. However, according to Monark, "gameplay never generated much money". In 2014, Igor started a video game channel where he played Grand Theft Auto, but he "[ended up] going crazy." Monark and Igor were "pissed off at life", with both agreeing that Flow Podcast was "the result of hate and depression". For the name, Monark initially suggested "Cult Flow", but Igor said that only Flow would be better.

At first, Monark and Igor paid for all the costs of the Flow Podcast, but around February and March 2020, the show started to pay for itself. After that, both started to live off Flow Podcast alone, earning money from sponsorships, AdSense, and Twitch. For a moment, they planned to make special episodes in North America. When asked if they were thinking of adapting Flow for radio or television, Igor replied that "we need freedom, If we don't have freedom, it's another show."

== Description ==
According to Monark, Flow was inspired by The Joe Rogan Experience by podcaster Joe Rogan. Also according to him, there is no agenda or conversation prior to recording the podcast. UOL and Exame have said that Flow is noted for its informal style, resembling a "bar conversation". The podcast has its official clips channel, which contains specific clips from the episodes.

== Criticism ==
=== Xbox Mil Grau and statement on racism ===
♔ Monark
(@monark)
tweeted:

Como eu ja havia dito antes, eu conversaria ate com o Hitler em pessoa no Flow Podcast. Não existe assunto taboo, não existe pessoa proibida. Eu conversaria com um serial killer, sem problemas, dado as devidas precauções kkkkk

Translation:

As I have said before, I would talk even to Hitler in person on the Flow Podcast. There is no taboo subject, there is no forbidden person. I would talk to a serial killer, no problem, given the proper precautions lol

15 June 2020

Between late May and early June 2020, members of the Xbox Mil Grau YouTube channel began to be accused of racism after tweets and certain speeches given on livestreams. Despite this, Flow invited them to the podcast, causing controversy; Monark stated that after the episode, Flow became "enemy number one" for some people. Later, during an appearance on the talk show The Noite com Danilo Gentili, when asked if they would "[think] twice before calling someone to the show", Monark and Igor said no, adding that fear or controversy is not a criterion for whether or not to invite someone to the podcast.

In October 2021, the show lost its sponsorship of the iFood delivery app, after Monark asked on Twitter if "having a racist opinion is a crime". (Note: Propmark reproduced a screenshot of lawyer Augusto de Arruda Botelho responding to Monark on Twitter: "No, Monark, a racist opinion can be a crime of racial slur, for example. I can give you other examples.") The company released a note in which it expressed that they repudiated "any type of prejudice or act of discrimination". The following month, the podcast and iFood jointly released a note stating that they would maintain occasional partnerships, but not sponsorship.

=== Defense of the existence of a Nazi party ===
On February 7, 2022, during the episode that had the participation of federal deputies Kim Kataguiri (UNIÃO-SP) and Tabata Amaral (PSB-SP), host Monark defended the existence of a legalized Nazi party in Brazil.

The radical left has much more [political] space than the radical right, in my opinion. The two need to have [the same] space. I'm crazier than all of you. I think the Nazis should have the Nazi party, recognized by law.

— Bruno Aiub ("Monark",)

In addition to advocating the creation of the Nazi party, he maintained that people should have the right to be "anti-Jewish". Tabata countered the opinion, saying that freedom of speech should not put the lives of others at risk, and that ideologies such as Nazism put entire groups at risk. Kim, in turn, stated that a Nazi party should not be banned. According to Kim, despite considering Nazism a "nefarious ideology", preventing public debate on extremist ideologies does not prevent the growth of extremist groups.

==== Repercussions ====
The communicator's statements generated a reaction from Israeli entities, including the Holocaust Museum in Curitiba, the Brazilian Israelite Confederation (CONIB) and the Israeli Federation of São Paulo (FISESP). The Holocaust Museum mentioned a past comment by Monark, and invited him to visit the museum to realize "that Nazism went far beyond people exercising, in their words, the 'right to be idiots.' CONIB condemned the idea of a Nazi party in Brazil and the right to be anti-Jewish. FISESP repudiated the ideas presented by the communicator, stating that Monark demonstrates a lack of commitment to democracy and human rights. The German embassy in Brazil said that defending Nazism is not freedom of speech.

Several interviewees requested that episodes in which they were interviewed by Monark had to be removed, such as Gabriela Prioli, Benjamin Back, MV Bill, Lucas Silveira, João Gordo and Ednaldo Pereira. Parties, politicians and STF justices repudiated the communicator's statements. Companies that sponsored the channel or had already sponsored it issued notes of repudiation of the statements and ended contracts with the Flow channel. The Football Federation of the State of Rio de Janeiro (FFERJ) terminated the contract it had with Flow Sports Club (the group's sub-channel on sports matters) to broadcast the 2022 Carioca Championship. The day after the live, Monark came to speak saying that he was under the influence of alcohol and that the speech had been distorted.

On the same day, Estúdios Flow communicated through their social networks that Monark was no longer part of the group. Subsequently, Monark said that "I may have been wrong in the way I expressed myself, but what they are doing to me is an inhuman lynching". To which the Holocaust Museum replied: "Inhuman lynching is what they did to Moïse Kabagambe (...) You were wrong, so we reiterate our invitation! With an open heart! Come visit us, without fanfare!". On 11 February 2022, bicycle company Monark, from whom the YouTuber took his nickname, denied any relationship with the YouTuber.

== Performance ==
Flow Podcast was frequently among the most watched podcasts in Brazil. The show debuted on Apple Podcasts' Top Podcasts chart on 17 February 2019, reaching the top of the chart on multiple occasions and on consecutive days — the first of which was on 13 August 2020. Sergio Moro participated in an interview on Flow as part of his political strategy for the 2022 elections. The live reached 82K simultaneous viewers, losing to Lula's audience on the Podpah podcast (292K) and Casimiro on Twitch (545,6K). Jair Bolsonaro's interview on 8 August 2022 reached a peak of more than 16.000.000 viewers, surpassing Lula's on Podpah.

== Members ==
Current

- Igor Coelho (Igor 3K) (2018–present)

Former members

- Bruno Aiub (Monark) (2018–2022)

=== Television ===
Year	Program	Note	Ref.
2020	The Noite com Danilo Gentili	Guest	
