= Guto Zacarias =

Brazilian politician (born 1999)

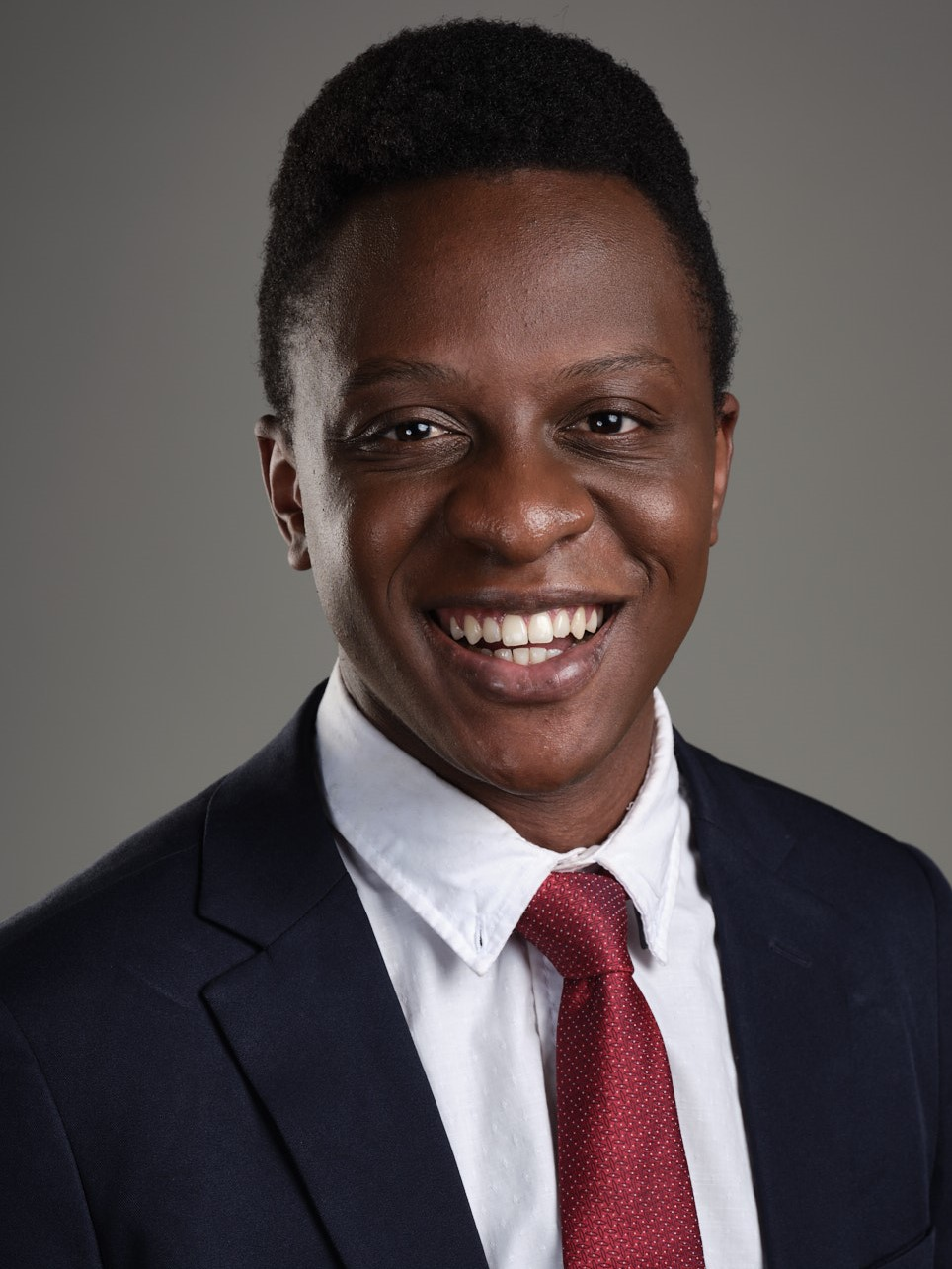
- Zacarias in 2022

Member of the Legislative Assembly of São Paulo
- Incumbent
- Assumed office 15 March 2023

Personal details
- Born: 29 April 1999 (age 27)
- Party: Mission (since 2026)
- Other political affiliations: Brazil Union (2022-2026)
- Relatives: José Correia Leite (great-grandfather)

Augusto Zacarias Corrêa Leite (born 29 April 1999), better known as Guto Zacarias, is a Brazilian politician serving as a member of the Legislative Assembly of São Paulo since 2023. He is the great-grandson of José Correia Leite.
