= Johannes Jakobs =

German footballer

Personal information
- Date of birth: 1 July 1917
- Place of birth: Cologne, Germany
- Date of death: 24 August 1944 (aged 27)
- Place of death: Upper Silesia, Poland
- Position: Midfielder

Senior career*
Years	Team	Apps	(Gls)
- Hannover 96

International career
1939	Germany	1	(0)
- * Club domestic league appearances and goals

Johannes Jakobs (1 July 1917 – 24 August 1944) was a German footballer who played as a midfielder for Hannover 96 and the Germany national team.

He served in World War II as on Oberfeldwebel in the Luftwaffe. He was killed on a reconnaissance flight on the Eastern Front in Poland and is buried at the Siemanowice war cemetery, Poland.
