= Ednaldo Pereira =

Brazilllian singer-songwriter and meme personality

- Born: Ednaldo Pereira da Silva; June 12, 1973 (age 53); Cachoeira dos Guedes, Guarabira, Paraíba, Brazil
- Genres: Pop; Brega; MPB
- Occupations: Singer; songwriter
- Instrument: Vocals

Ednaldo Pereira da Silva (Guarabira, June 12, 1973) is a Brazilian singer-songwriter. He became an internet phenomenon starting in 2008, with songs such as Vale Nada Vale Tudo and What is the Brother. His TV and internet appearances made him a key figure in the Brazilian YouTube Poop scene.

== Career ==
Ednaldo Pereira was born in the Cachoeira dos Guedes district in Guarabira, in Paraíba, on June 12, 1973. He started singing during his childhood, when he made his first compositions. As well as being a singer-songwriter, Ednaldo is also a street cleaner. Considered one of the first Brazilian YouTube memes, the apex of his fame came in 2008. Early that year, the sum of all of the videos he uploaded to his channel had surpassed 300,000 views. He also made success on Orkut, with communities being created in his homage. Hsi compositions and music videos viralized due to his excentric style, where he mixed English and Portuguese. His greatest hits are Vale Nada Vale Tudo, What is the Brother, and Banido Desbanido. After a fan campaign, he was interviewed by Jô Soares, on Programa do Jô. In June 2008, he signed a contract authorizing EMI Music to sell his songs as ringtones. In 2013, Ednaldo damaged the company for material losses and moral damage as the company did not pay him correctly. In 2018, granted a court ruling favoring the singer and EMI Music was condemned to pay for all downloaded and sold songs.

After the success as a singer, Ednaldo remained popular as a meme, becoming a success on other platforms. He uploads daily beatbox videos, new songs, and, in some cases, political context. Ednaldo uses a Casio keyboard to compose and perform his songs. His videos usually move his camera in a way that it focuses on his paunch, later on his head, and so forth. On his social media accounts, he publishes videos where he names characters from franchises such as Ben 10, Pokémon and Digimon, plays ball and posts fan-made montages. Online, he's still nicknamed "mestre" and "adm", as well as being cited in memes as a "powerful being of the universe".

In September 2023, he announced his first show with his own band, in João Pessoa, which happened on October 7.

=== Homages ===
In 2020, a game was launched in his homage, Ednaldo Pereira: Mescladasso, created by Pedro Gonçalves. In July 2023, Pedro created a second game.

In November 2022, Ednaldo was included in artwork made for the 135th anniversary of the elevation of Guarabira to municipality, at Beco de Candeia, one of the main accesses of the city and a historic location in the municipality.
