= Günther Jakobs =

German jurist(born 1937)

Günther Jakobs (n. Mönchengladbach, 26 July 1937), is a German jurist, specializing in criminal law, criminal procedural law and philosophy of law.

Jakobs studied legal sciences in Cologne, Kiel and Bonn, and in 1967 he graduated from the University of Bonn with a thesis on criminal law and competition doctrine.

In 1971 he obtained his law degree, also in Bonn, through a work on negligence in the crime of result and the following year he held his first chair at the University of Kiel.

Jakobs enjoys prestige in Latin America and Spain, as his conception of Criminal Law, building a system of Functional Criminal Law, has been echoed in doctrine and jurisprudence. In this last area, the Jakobsian concept of the "Role" has served to limit the liability of those who only intervene with neutral behavior. By his position, he has also echoed his conception of authorship and participation in special crimes, with his theory of crimes of breach of duty, and his doctrine of the "criminal law of the enemy."

== Books ==
In German

- Die Konkurrenz von Tötungsdelikten mit Körperverletzungsdelikten (Dissertation), Bonn 1967
- Studien zum fahrlässigen Erfolgsdelikt (Habilitationsschrift), Bonn 1971, Buchausgabe Berlin/New York 1972 ISBN 3-11-003889-7
- Schuld und Prävention, Tübingen 1976 ISBN 3-16-638121-X
- (als Herausgeber:) Rechtsgeltung und Konsens, Berlin 1976 ISBN 3-428-03624-7
- Strafrecht, Allgemeiner Teil – Die Grundlagen und die Zurechnungslehre (Lehrbuch), Berlin/New York 1983, 2. Aufl. 1991 ISBN 3-11-011214-0, Studienausgabe 1993 ISBN 3-11-014193-0
- Der strafrechtliche Handlungsbegriff, München 1992 ISBN 3-406-37131-0
- Das Schuldprinzip, Opladen 1993 ISBN 3-531-07319-2
- Geschriebenes Recht und wirkliches Recht beim Schwangerschaftsabbruch, Bochum 1994 ISBN 3-927855-68-5
- Die strafrechtliche Zurechnung von Tun und Unterlassen, Paderborn 1996 ISBN 3-506-70016-2; dass., Opladen 1996 ISBN 3-531-07344-3
- Norm, Person, Gesellschaft – Vorüberlegungen zu einer Rechtsphilosophie, Berlin 1997, 2. Aufl. 1999 ISBN 3-428-09067-5
- Tötung auf Verlangen, Euthanasie und Strafrechtssystem, München 1998 ISBN 3-7696-1599-9
- Urkundenfälschung – Revision eines Täuschungsdelikts, Köln/Berlin/Bonn/München 2000 ISBN 3-452-24384-2
- Staatliche Strafe – Bedeutung und Zweck, Paderborn/München/Wien/Zürich 2004 ISBN 3-506-71328-0
- Kritik des Vorsatzbegriffs, Mohr Siebeck (Verlag) 2020 ISBN 978-3-16-159489-2
