= Kim Kataguiri =

Brazilian politician (born 1996)

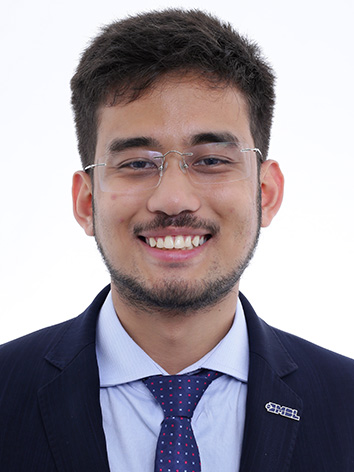
- Official portrait, 2019

Member of the Chamber of Deputies
- Incumbent
- Assumed office 1 February 2019
- Constituency: São Paulo

Personal details
- Born: Kim Patroca Kataguiri; 28 January 1996 (age 30) Salto, São Paulo, Brazil
- Party: MISSÃO (since 2026)
- Other political affiliations: DEM (2018–2022); PODE (2022); UNIÃO (2022–2026)
- Education: Federal University of ABC (dropped out)
- Occupation: Activist, politician
- Website: kimkataguiri.com.br

YouTube information
- Channel: @kimkataguiri
- Years active: 2009–present
- Subscribers: 2 million
- Views: 895 million
- Last updated: 4 August 2026

Kim Patroca Kataguiri (born 28 January 1996) is a Brazilian politician, activist, lecturer, and one of the founders and leaders of the Free Brazil Movement, a centre-right group. In October 2018, he was elected a congressman for the 2019–2022 term, being the fourth most voted.

== Political career ==
According to Kataguiri, his involvement in politics began in August 2013 when he was 17 years old. In a history class at his college in São Paulo state, his teacher asserted that Brazil's "popular cash transfer program applauded by many experts around the globe was responsible for the expansion of Brazil's middle class and for lifting millions of citizens from poverty during the last decade." Kataguiri was not convinced: "That just seemed wrong. The family allowance might be necessary, but it has flaws and the main reasons for our high economic growth was the commodities boom and our relationship with China." He was also struck by how his peers readily accepted Brazil's model of state capitalism as practiced by the ruling Workers' Party. Rather than respond to his teacher in class, Kataguiri posted a video to YouTube, which quickly went viral. Kataguiri said: "This was when I realized I could use the internet to defend free market values." He posted to YouTube more satirical videos, which gained millions of views as Brazil fell into recession and political crisis.

Kataguiri then founded the Free Brazil Movement, "a libertarian group that espouses free-market values". The first goal of the movement was to impeach Dilma Rousseff, the then-president of Brazil who belongs to the left-wing Workers' Party, for her failure to stop corruption in the state-owned oil and gas company Petrobras. Kataguiri characterizes the Workers' Party as "the nemesis of freedom and democracy." Kataguiri says the broader goals of the movement are "to liberalize the state. We want less tax, less bureaucracy and the privatization of all public companies." On 15 March 2015, more than a million Brazilians attended anti-Rousseff protests around the country. In São Paulo, Kataguiri addressed 200,000 protesters in the largest demonstration in the city in a generation.

In October 2015, Time magazine named Kataguiri as one of the most influential teens of 2015.

In the 2018 general election, Kataguiri was elected to the federal Chamber of Deputies for the state of São Paulo. Receiving 465,310 votes, he came fourth in his state, being the fourth most voted amongst all candidates.

In January 2022, Kataguiri changed his political affiliation to Podemos, in order to support Sergio Moro's run for the presidency in the 2022 Brazilian general election. Following the controversy of fellow Free Brazil Movement politician Arthur do Val's sexist remarks while on a trip to Ukraine in early-March 2022, Kataguiri changed his political affiliation to União Brasil.

== Personal life ==
Kataguiri is the grandson of Japanese immigrants. He spent his early years in the city of Indaiatuba. His father, Paulo Atuhiro Kataguiri is a retired metal worker. Kataguiri claimed in an interview to be an Anglican Christian. He supports legalization of marijuana and same-sex marriage, but opposes abortion because in his view, it goes against the biblical commandment thou shall not kill. In his spare time, Kataguiri plays Dota 2, a game in which he admits to be a newbie but believes he is improving. He occasionally streams his Dota matches live on Twitch.

He claims to be a descendant of Katagiri Katsumoto.

== Controversies ==
In February 2022, during his participation in the Flow Podcast, Kim Kataguiri stated that Germany was wrong to criminalize Nazism. “What's the best way to stop a speech from killing people and a racial ethnic group from dying? Is it criminalizing it? Or is it letting society socially reject it?”, declared the deputy.

After the backlash, Kataguiri did a livestream with professor Heni Ozi Cukier explaining his previous position, saying that during the program he was referring to the criminalization of written works such as Mein Kampf, written by Adolf Hitler, not about Nazism.

The controversy was discussed in the podcast The Joe Rogan Experience (episode 1781 with the participation of Coleman Hughes) where the presenter (Joe Rogan) recalled about a case that the American Civil Liberties Union preferred not to silence the Nazis “just 30 years after the Holocaust.” According to him, the union “had many Jewish lawyers.” This case is known as the Skokie case.

== Electoral history ==
Year	Election	Party	Office	Votes	Percent	Result
2018	State Elections of São Paulo	DEM	Federal Deputy	465,310	2.20%	Elected
2022	State Elections of São Paulo	UNIÃO	Federal Deputy	295,460	1.24%	Elected
2026	State Elections of São Paulo	Missão	Federal Deputy	520,071	2.19%	Elected
