= Enemy criminal law =

Criminal law and civil rights concept

The Feindstrafrecht (German for "enemy criminal law") is a criminal law and civil rights concept outlined in 1985 by the German criminal law professor Günther Jakobs. The Feindstrafrecht says that certain people, as enemies of the society (or the state), do not deserve the protections of civil or penal law. The Feindstrafrecht allows every available means to pursue and punish those enemies.

It is worth pointing out that the Feindstrafrecht is not a law. Rather, it means the suspension of certain laws in order to protect the society or the state from certain dangers. Jakobs' writings propose the term "Criminal Law of the Citizen" ("Bürgerstrafrecht") as the counterpart of the "Criminal Law of the Enemy". The concept of the Feindstrafrecht is opposed by most scholars of penal law and legal philosophers alike. Jakobs points out that he was merely describing an existing phenomenon, while critics say that he took a position of affirmative endorsement in his 2004 publication.

In the latter publication, Jakobs proposes that anybody who does not respect the laws and the legal order of a state - or even wants to destroy them - should lose all rights as a citizen and as a human being, and the state should then persecute him or her with all available means. This means that a terrorist who wants to subvert the societal norms, a criminal who ignores all laws, or a mafia member who only respects the rules of his clan, for example, should be designated an "unperson" whose rights are forfeit. Such a person must be treated, not as a person, but as an "enemy."

Jakobs' philosophical justification of the necessity of a Feindstrafrecht appeals to Hobbesian social contract theory and its interpretation by Immanuel Kant. Whoever terminates that social contract by dishonoring it leaves society and enters the lawless natural state. Thereby, he loses his rights as a person and turns into an enemy, and, as such, is to be persecuted by the society.

== Current events ==
Although the Feindstrafrecht ethos has historically been applied by the Germanic peoples at least as early as the Medieval Ages, the German Nazi era was notorious for it. Beggars, disabled people, Jews, trade union members, and other persons were designated "Volksschädlinge" ("vermin of the people") and thus imprisoned at will by the Gestapo and quickly condemned by the Volksgerichtshof.

In Colombia, since 1990, a kind of Feindstrafrecht is applied against drug dealers. The accused are imprisoned without accusation, often for years, and held without access to a lawyer. The accused are then often tried based on anonymous witness evidence.

The designation of Al Qaida terrorists and Taliban fighters as "unlawful combatants" and their imprisonment at Guantanamo Bay Naval Base can be considered an example of the Feindstrafrecht concept, as can many targeted killings by drones of the US Air Force.

== Criticism ==
Criticism is leveled by several law scholars, for example because the Feindstrafrecht in itself is not a law, but intends to disable existing laws in order to deprive people of legal protections. The German Basic law also stipulates that human dignity of all people has to be protected by the German government, not only the dignity of those who respect the law. The social philosopher Oskar Negt, in his 2010 work "Der politische Mensch - Demokratie als Lebensform", summarizes some other criticism.
