= Fernando Holiday =

Brazilian politician

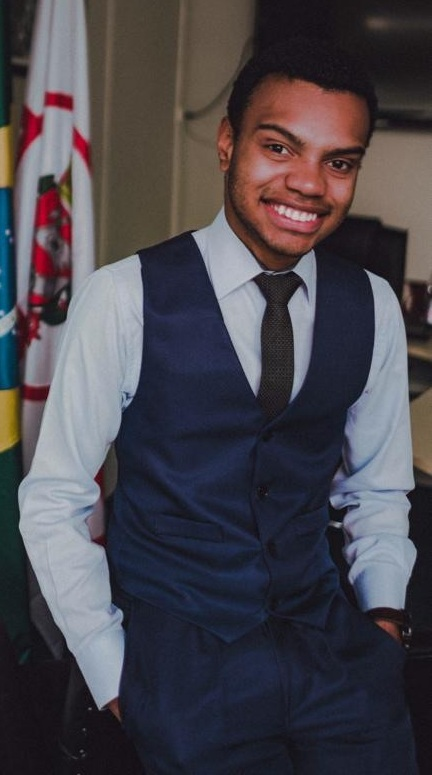

Member of the Municipal Chamber of São Paulo
- In office 1 January 2017 – 1 January 2025
- Constituency: At-large

Personal details
- Born: Fernando Silva Bispo; 22 September 1996 (age 30) São Paulo, Brazil
- Party: PL (2023–present)
- Other political affiliations: DEM (2017–20); Patriota (2020–21); NOVO (2021–22); Republicanos (2022–2023)

Fernando Silva Bispo, better known as Fernando Holiday (born 22 September 1996) is a Brazilian politician affiliated to the Liberal Party (PL) and councilor of the city of São Paulo. He was elected with 48,055 votes in the 2016 elections, and became the first openly gay councilor, before later publicly renouncing his homosexuality.

He was the national coordinator of the Free Brazil Movement (MBL) and a law student. Holiday became known for convening protests against the Dilma Rousseff government.

== Political career ==
At the age of 20, Holiday was elected the youngest councilor in the history of São Paulo, with 48,055 votes.

When he ran for councilman, Holiday was supported by Senator Ronaldo Caiado (DEM-GO), noting that "Holiday has the capacity to represent Brazilians who hope to see renewed policy in it. The real interest in seeing the diminution of the privileges that are granted to politicians, as for example the high salaries and heavy benefits sustained by the voters, will be diminished, as Holiday already promised.

In 2020, he left his party, Democrats, after they supported a bill that aimed to limit transport apps in the city. He joined Patriot, and was reelected with 67,715 votes.

In 2021, he was expelled from Patriot, after criticizing the party's support of Arthur Lira to President of the Chamber of Deputies. He joined New Party a few months later. That same year, he left the Free Brazil Movement, mentioning the movement's lack of priority to the fight against abortion and to the defense of LGBTQ causes.

In 2022, he ran to the federal Chamber of Deputies for the state of São Paulo, but failed to be elected, receiving 38,118 votes. Just four days later, he left New Party and joined Republicans, and said he would not seek reelection for city council in 2024. Nine months later, in July 2023, he left Republicans, and said he hoped to continue to support right-wing ideals "under the leadership of (former) president Jair Bolsonaro", despite not supporting him during his reelection campaign. Days later, he joined the Liberal Party, with Bolsonaro at this side during this affiliation. He once again said he would not seek reelection for city council, saying his focus was on the 2026 election to the federal Chamber of Deputies, but in 2024 said he considers the possibility of leaving politics to go to medical school.

== Political positions ==
In his first term as councilman, he undertook to donate 20 percent of his salary. Holiday also signed a term whereby he will agree to waive 50 percent of the current budget of the office, waive the use of the official car and driver and waive 50 percent of the money for operating expenses, going according to the popular demands of that austerity should be for everyone at a time of economic crisis.

Holiday is opposed to the withdrawal of LGBTQ and Black rights: "They should not have less rights, but should not have more rights." Holiday is against the policy of racial quotas in Brazil, considering that they encourage racism. "One of my proposals, not the main one, but one that I intend to propose over the next year, is the repeal of racial quotas in municipal public tenders. encouraging racism ... I believe it is a measure harmful to the state of São Paulo and harmful, even for the blacks themselves" said Holiday.

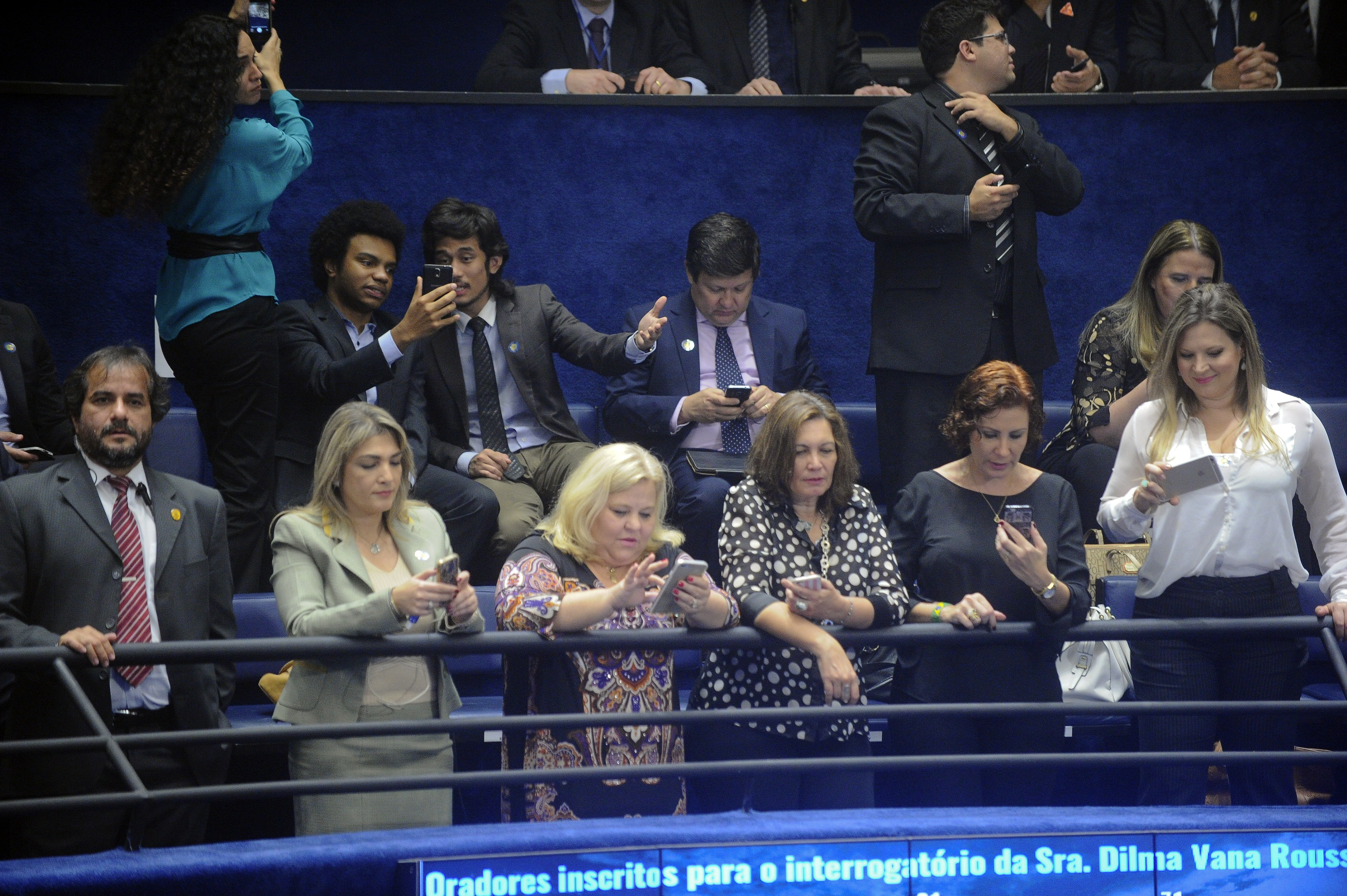
Holiday (sitting, left), Kim Kataguiri (sitting, on the phone) and Joice Hasselmann (right, in white) on 29 August 2016 in Federal Senate, following one of the votes of Impeachment of Dilma Rousseff.

In an interview with Brazil-Post, he said he was against invasions in schools. "Studying is a guaranteed right and it is not half a dozen students who do not even know what they are protesting against." Regarding PEC 241, he is in favor of the proposal and also in favor of the measure and of the social security and labor reforms defended by President Michel Temer. In this same interview, Holiday said that he will combat the victimhood, and said to be in favor of the 10 Measures against corruption, a bill of authorship of the Federal Public Ministry.

He has a liberal political position, and that all should be equal before the law, as the Brazilian Constitution says even if it admits to being a new figure of Brazilian Conservatism.

In December 2016 his public position was opposed to the increase of the salaries of the councilors of São Paulo, approved on 20 December by the own ones, a readjustment of 26.3%, in the middle of financial crisis. On 25 December, Judge Alberto Alonso Munoz through a preliminary injunction suspended the salary increase on the grounds that it violates the Fiscal Responsibility Law. The preliminary injunction was a popular action. In 2016, he gave an interview to Brasil Paralelo, a group that in his documentaries, among others, explained Dilma Rousseff's impeachment.

== Controversies ==
In 2018, politician Ciro Gomes called Fernando Holiday a "capitão do mato" (Bush captain, a Black hunter of runaway slaves; akin to Uncle Tom). In an interview with Rádio Jovem Pan, while presenting his political proposals, Ciro, without being asked about Fernando Holiday, said:

"You imagine that Fernando Holiday, how is it? ... it is the "capitão do mato", that the worst thing that has is the Black that is used by the prejudice to stigmatize, that was the "capitão do mato" in the past.

Holiday said on video that he wants to sue him. On 12 July 2018, a police investigation was opened to investigate the nature of the allegations. In 2019, Gomes was convicted and ordered to pay R$38,000 in moral damages.

== Personal life ==
Holiday is a Roman Catholic convert from Evangelical Protestantism and due to his religious faith he abstains himself from relationships. He is a gay man. Holiday is against the practice of abortion and proposed a law to restrict it.

=== Alleged murder attempt ===
On 26 December 2018 there was a session in the City Hall of São Paulo in which Holiday voted for the approval of pension reform that negatively impacted tens of thousands of city workers. Holiday was the rapporteur of this project. The vote sparked protests. Moments after approval, Holiday alleged that he had suffered an attempted murder while in his office. On this day Holiday posted a photo on his Twitter account which showed a hole supposedly caused by a gunshot. The Civil Police investigated the case but found it inconclusive, due to lack of material evidence.

== Electoral history ==
Election	Office	Party	Votes	%	
Election	Office	Party	Votes	%	Result
2016 São Paulo municipal election	City council	Democrats	48,055	0,90%	Elected
2020 São Paulo municipal election	City council	Patriot	67,715	1,32%	Elected
2022 São Paulo State Election	Federal deputy	New Party	38,118	0,16%	Substitute
