= National Union of Students (Brazil) =

Student organization in Brazil

- União Nacional dos Estudantes
- Formation: August 11, 1937; 88 years ago
- Founded at: Rio de Janeiro
- Type: Student organization
- Location: São Paulo

The National Union of Students (União Nacional dos Estudantes or UNE) is a student organization in Brazil. Founded on 11 August 1937, it represents more than 5 million students of higher education, and is headquartered in São Paulo, with branch offices in Rio de Janeiro and Goiás. Its main objective is to achieve education better conditions in the education sector. Although not officially linked to any political party, since 1980 it has been directed by members coming from the Communist Party of Brazil (PCdoB). In July 2019, the 57th Congress of the National Union of Students elected Iago Montalvão, an economics student at the University of São Paulo (USP), as its new president.
