= Free Brazil Movement =

Brazilian political movement

- Abbreviation: MBL
- Formation: 1 November 2014; 11 years ago
- Headquarters: São Paulo, Brazil
- Key people: Kim Kataguiri; Renan Santos
- Affiliations: Mission Party
- Website: mbl.org.br

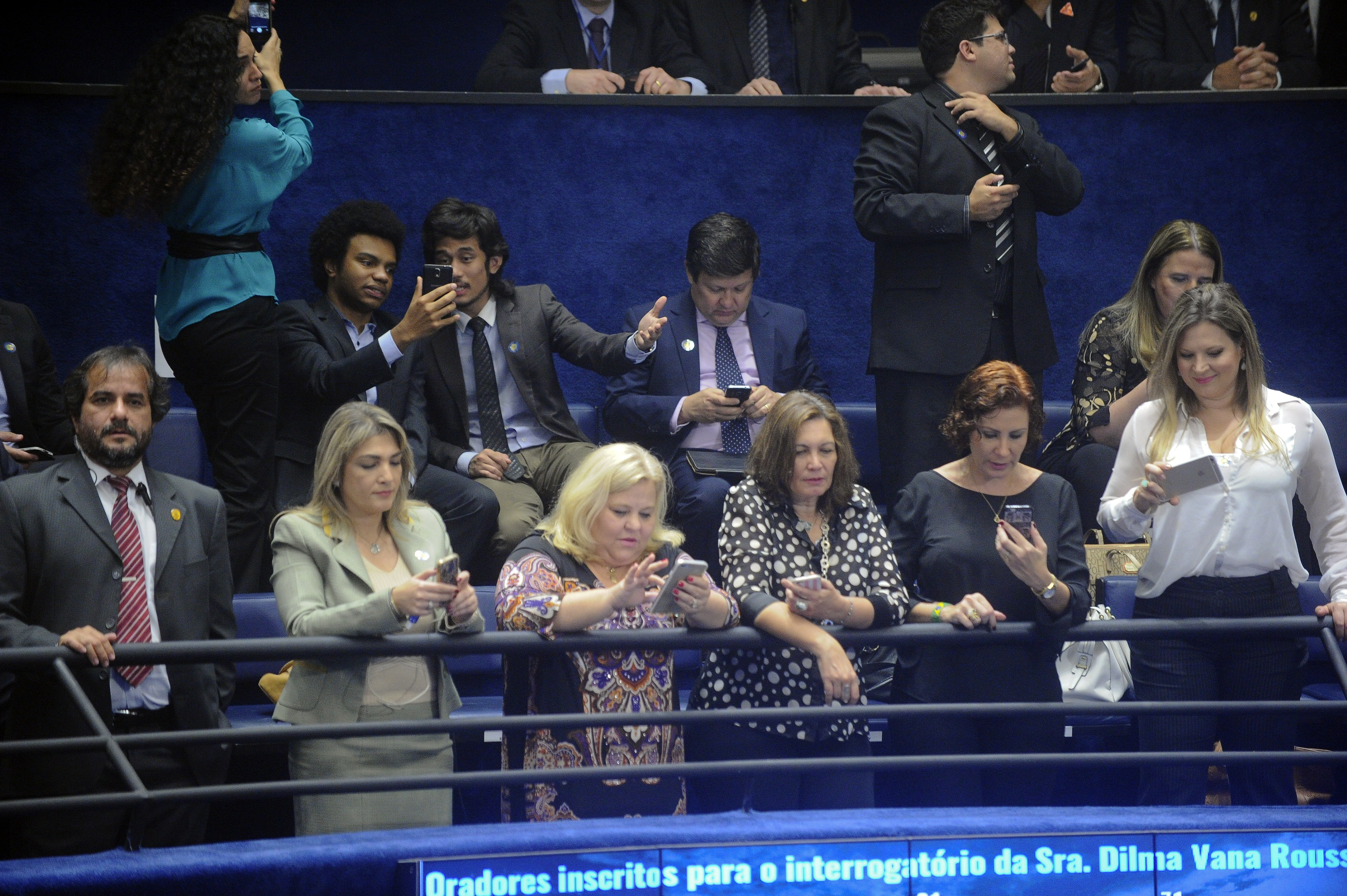
Fernando Holiday, Kataguiri, Bia Kicis, Carla Zambelli and Joice Hasselmann.

The Free Brazil Movement (Portuguese: Movimento Brasil Livre, MBL) is a Brazilian fiscally conservative and economically liberal movement founded on Saturday, 1 November 2014. It grew from the political dissatisfaction after the 2013 protests in Brazil, receiving funding from internal (e.g.: Democratas, PSDB, PMDB) sources. Its leader is the activist and lawmaker Kim Kataguiri.

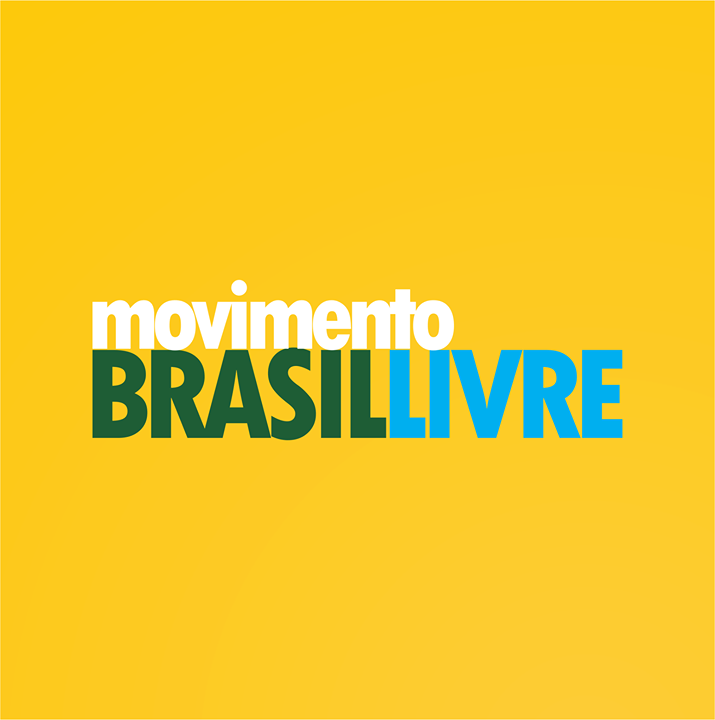
The first logo used by the MBL.

Logo used until 2024.

According to the newspaper Folha de S.Paulo, the MBL was mainly responsible for the convening of the demonstrations of 15 March and 12 April in 2015 against the social governmental establishment of Dilma Rousseff and the Workers' Party. The group's headquarters are located in São Paulo, and according to The Economist, was "founded last year to promote the answers of the free market for the country's problems". In a manifesto published on the internet, the MBL, often described as the "Brazilian Tea Party", cites its five goals, "free and independent press, economic freedom, separation of powers, free and reputable elections, and the end of direct and indirect subsidies to dictatorships".

The movement also voices strong opposition to cultural liberal ideas such as the rights to abortion and mandated gender-equality efforts. It has been described therefore as "liberal towards economics and conservative towards habits".

Many of the movement's pages were removed from Facebook in August 2018, before the 2018 elections, under the justification that they were being used to promote fake news.

In November 2023, during their National Congress event, the movement announced the intention to create a party called Mission, with the intention of disputing the 2024 Brazilian municipal elections. The party was officially registered in November 2025 and is eligible for the 2026 Brazilian general election.

In August 2026, entrepreneur Renan Santos, one of the founders of the Free Brazil Movement, was chosen as the presidential candidate by the Mission party.
