= 2026 Brazilian presidential election =

Fourth election of Lula da Silva as President of Brazil

2026 Brazlian presidential election
- 4 October 2026 (first round); 25 October 2026 (second round)
- Opinion polls
- Turnout: 78.92% (first round; ▼0.13 pp); 80.78% (second round; ▲1.57 pp)
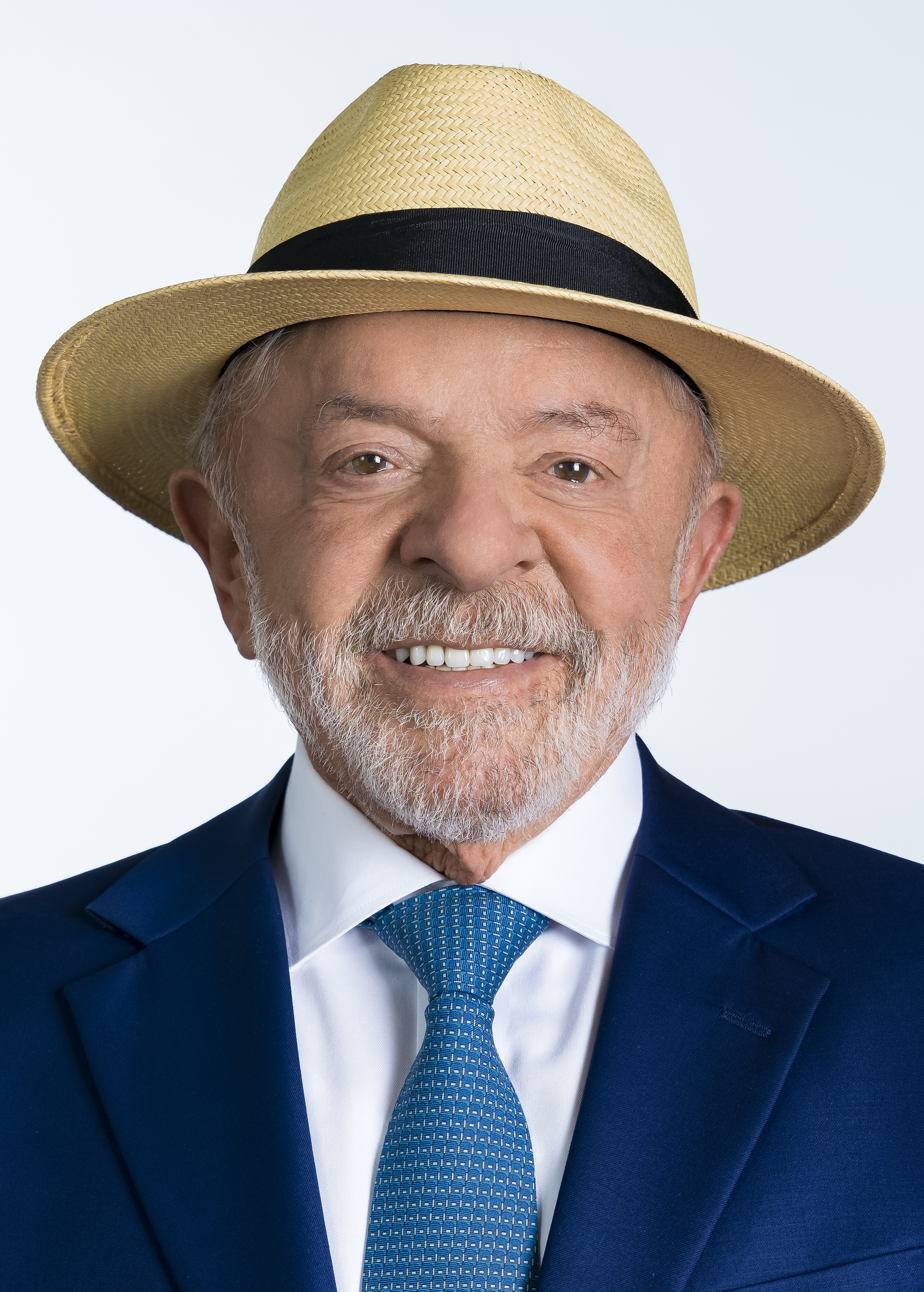

Candidate	Lula da Silva	Flávio Bolsonaro
Party	PT	PL
Alliance	Brazil Ready for More (Note: Lula da Silva received second-round endorsements from Samara Martins of Popular Unity (UP), Hertz Dias of the United Socialist Workers' Party (PSTU), and Edmilson Costa of the Brazilian Communist Party (PCB).)	None (Note: Flávio Bolsonaro received second-round endorsements from Augusto Cury of Avante, Ronaldo Caiado of the Social Democratic Party (PSD), Romeu Zema of the New Party (NOVO), and Clariana Barão of Christian Democracy (DC).)
Running mate	Geraldo Alckmin (PSB)	Alfredo Gaspar
Popular vote	64,256,232	59,826,041
Percentage	51.79%	48.21%
President before election
Luiz Inácio Lula da Silva
PT
Elected President
Luiz Inácio Lula da Silva
PT

On 4 October 2026, an election was held as a part of the 2026 Brazilian general election to elect the president and vice president of the Federal Republic of Brazil. The election, mainly contested between incumbent president, Luiz Inácio Lula da Silva and Flávio Bolsonaro came after 4 years of investigation into Bolsonaro's father, Jair Bolsonaro due to his involvement in the 2022–2023 Brazilian coup plot.

In the first round, senator Flávio Bolsonaro of the state of Rio de Janeiro, the eldest son of former president Jair Bolsonaro, led with 47% of the vote over incumbent president Luiz Inácio Lula da Silva's 45%. In the second round, Lula overcame his first-round loss and was re-elected in an upset victory to a fourth non-consecutive term as president, outperforming his 2022 result. It was the first instance of a Brazilian presidential election in which the winner of the first round was defeated in the runoff.

== Background ==
Having unsuccessfully run for president in 1989, 1994 and 1998, Luiz Inácio Lula da Silva of the left-wing Workers' Party was elected in 2002 and 2006. He was then succeeded by his chief of staff, Dilma Rousseff, who was elected in 2010 and 2014. In 2016, Rousseff was removed from office due to administrative misconduct and was succeeded by her vice president, Michel Temer, of the centrist Brazilian Democratic Movement. Lula attempted to run for president again, but was prevented due to his conviction on corruption charges in 2017 as part of Operation Car Wash and imprisoned in 2018. Right-wing candidate Jair Bolsonaro of the Social Liberal Party was elected president in 2018. Bolsonaro left the Social Liberal Party in 2019 and joined the Liberal Party in 2021.

A series of rulings by the Supreme Federal Court (STF) questioning the legality of Lula's trial led to his release from prison in 2019 and the restoration of his political rights by 2021. Lula narrowly defeated Bolsonaro in the 2022 presidential election, securing a non-consecutive third term. In response to his loss, some Bolsonaro supporters demanded a military coup to prevent Lula's inauguration, but failed to gather sufficient support. Bolsonaro was subsequently convicted by the STF, barred from running for a second term before 2030, and arrested in 2025. He endorsed his eldest son, Senator Flávio Bolsonaro.

== Candidates ==
Party	Presidential candidate	Vice presidential candidate (Note: Same party as the presidential candidate, unless mentioned in parentheses.)	Coalition	Free airtime (Note: Candidates from coalitions that include parties which passed the electoral threshold in 2022 are entitled to free advertisement on television and radio from 28 August to 1 October 2026. The block for presidential candidates occurs three days per week, twice per day, for 12min30s, of which 10% are divided equally among all candidates entitled to airtime, and 90% are distributed proportionally to the number of federal deputies of the parties in each candidate's coalition. The times listed below are in minutes and seconds per block. If there is a runoff election, the two remaining candidates receive blocks of free airtime divided equally between them, from 9 to 23 October 2026.)
Workers' Party (PT 13)	Luiz Inácio Lula da Silva (campaign) President of Brazil (2003–2011, 2023–present); Federal deputy for São Paulo (1987–1991)	Geraldo Alckmin (PSB) Vice President of Brazil (2023–present); Governor of São Paulo (2001–2006, 2011–2018); Vice Governor of São Paulo (1995–2001); Federal deputy for São Paulo (1987–1995); Mayor of Pindamonhangaba (1977–1982)	Brazil Ready for More: Brazil of Hope (PT, PCdoB, PV); PSOL REDE Federation (PSOL, REDE); Brazilian Socialist Party (PSB); Democratic Labour Party (PDT)	5min32s
Mission Party (MISSÃO 14)	Renan Santos	Aroldo Medina	Standalone party	—N/a
United Socialist Workers' Party (PSTU 16)	Hertz Dias	Vanessa Portugal	Standalone party	—N/a
Brazilian Communist Party (PCB 21)	Edmilson Costa	Cleusa Santos	Standalone party	—N/a
Liberal Party (PL 22)	Flávio Bolsonaro (campaign) Senator for Rio de Janeiro (2019–present)	Alfredo Gaspar Federal deputy for Alagoas (2023–present)	Standalone party	4min20s
Christian Democracy (DC 27)	Clariana Barão	Fabiana Torquato	Standalone party	—N/a
Workers' Cause Party (PCO 29)	Rui Costa Pimenta	Antônio Carlos	Standalone party	—N/a
New Party (NOVO 30)	Romeu Zema Governor of Minas Gerais (2019–2026)	Eduardo Girão Senator for Ceará (2019–present)	Standalone party	—N/a
Democrata (DEMOCRATA 35)	Wilson Grassi	Suêd Haidar	Standalone party	—N/a
Social Democratic Party (PSD 55)	Ronaldo Caiado (campaign) Governor of Goiás (2019–2026); Senator for Goiás (2015–2019); Federal deputy for Goiás (1991–1995, 1999–2015)	Gilberto Kassab Minister of Science and Technology (2016–2019); Minister of Cities (2015–2016); Mayor of São Paulo (2006–2013); Vice Mayor of São Paulo (2005–2006); Federal deputy for São Paulo (1999–2005)	Standalone party	2min02s
Avante (AVANTE 70)	Augusto Cury	Júlio Delgado Federal deputy for Minas Gerais (1999–2000, 2003–2023)	Brazil of Our Dreams: Avante; Agir	36s
Popular Unity (UP 80)	Samara Martins	Raquel Brício	Standalone party	—N/a

=== Potential candidates who did not run ===
Withdrawn or declined to be candidates
- Leonardo Avalanche, national president of the Brazilian Labour Renewal Party (2024–present)
- Joaquim Barbosa, Justice of the STF (2003–2014)
- Michelle Bolsonaro, First Lady of Brazil (2019–2023)
- Cabo Daciolo, federal deputy for Rio de Janeiro (2015–2019) and candidate for president in 2018
- Tarcísio de Freitas, governor of São Paulo (2023–present), minister of Infrastructure (2019–2022), and director general of the National Department of Transport Infrastructure (2014–2015)
- Ciro Gomes, federal deputy for Ceará (2007–2011), minister of national integration (2003–2006) and of finance (1994), governor of Ceará (1991–1994), and candidate for president in 1998, 2002, 2018, and 2022
- Fernando Haddad, minister of finance (2023–2026), mayor of São Paulo (2013–2017), minister of education (2005–2012), and runner-up candidate in 2018
- Ratinho Júnior, governor of Paraná (2019–present) and federal deputy for Paraná (2007–2015)
- Eduardo Leite, governor of Rio Grande do Sul (2019–2022, 2023–present)
- Gusttavo Lima, singer and songwriter
- Jones Manoel, communist influencer and political commentator
- Felipe Neto, YouTuber and businessman
- Aécio Neves, federal deputy for Minas Gerais (1987–2002, 2019–present), governor of Minas Gerais (2003–2010), senator for Minas Gerais (2011–2019), president of the Chamber of Deputies (2001–2002), and runner-up candidate in 2014
- Aldo Rebelo, minister of defence (2015–2016), of science, technology and innovations (2015), and of sports (2011–2015); president of the Chamber of Deputies (2005–2007), chief minister of the Secretariat of Institutional Affairs (2004–2005), and federal deputy for São Paulo (1991–2011)
- Marina Silva, federal deputy for São Paulo (2026–present), minister of the environment (2003–2008, 2023–2026), senator for Acre (1995–2002, 2008–2011), and candidate for president in 2010, 2014, and 2018

Ineligible or disqualified candidates

The following individuals expressed an interest in running but were ineligible or disqualified:

- Eduardo Bolsonaro, federal deputy for São Paulo (2015–2025) (endorsed brother Flávio Bolsonaro)
  - When his father Jair Bolsonaro became ineligible, Eduardo Bolsonaro declared his candidacy for president. After being removed from the office of federal deputy, he withdrew his candidacy and declared support for his brother, Flávio Bolsonaro. On 16 June 2026, he became ineligible for 12 years due to his conviction of coercion in the investigation process of the 2022–2023 coup d'état plot for provoking the 2025–2026 Brazil–United States diplomatic dispute.
- Jair Bolsonaro, president of Brazil (2019–2022) and federal deputy for Rio de Janeiro (1991–2018) (endorsed son Flávio Bolsonaro)
  - On 30 June 2023, Bolsonaro was declared ineligible until 2030 for abuse of political power and misuse of the media after attacking the Brazilian electoral system at a meeting with foreign ambassadors on 18 July 2022, broadcast on the public television network TV Brasil. On 11 September 2025, he was sentenced to 27 years in prison for being involved in the 2022–2023 coup d'état plot.
- Nikolas Ferreira, federal deputy for Minas Gerais (2023–present) (endorsed Flávio Bolsonaro)
  - Under the Constitution, the president of Brazil must be at least 35 years old at inauguration, and Ferreira would be 30 years old in January 2027.
- Pablo Marçal, businessman and influencer
  - On 21 February 2025, Marçal was declared ineligible until 2032 for abuse of economic and political power, misuse of the media, and illicit fundraising during his campaign in the 2024 São Paulo mayoral election. He was convicted for the second time in April and for the third time in July for other electoral crimes committed in 2024. On 11 September 2026, the Superior Electoral Court ruled Marçal ineligible due to his lack of affiliation to the nominating party before the required deadline and his previous criminal convictions.

== Campaign ==
=== Early developments ===
In late October 2025, President Lula da Silva announced the beginning of his re-election campaign, for his fourth presidential term. Some media sources and opposition figures raised concerns about Lula's age, especially following a fall and brain bleed he suffered in December 2024. Polls at the time from Quaest reported that 38% of respondents made crime their primary concern.

In December 2025, Flávio Bolsonaro, senator of Rio de Janeiro and son of the imprisoned Jair Bolsonaro, announced his intended candidacy. Shortly after his announcement, he suggested dropping out of the campaign in return for favors, saying "There's a possibility I won't go all the way, ... have a price for that. I will negotiate." Many believed this meant that Bolsonaro was saying he would drop out of the election if his father was released from prison. Bolsonaro later retracted this statement saying that after speaking with his father, he would continue with his campaign.

Following the first-round results, the Fluminense Federal University (UFF) was the first university to mobilize students to take to the streets on the day after the election, in a movement that inspired other educational institutions across the country. The first demonstration was organised organically and spontaneously, out of a mixture of "anger and fear". Residents came down from their apartment buildings to join the protest, which drew approximately 2,000 to 3,000 people. In his victory speech, Lula gave special thanks to the students who had mobilised across Brazil.

Lula made efforts to make the Constitutional Amendment to End the 6x1 Work Schedule pass, and in October Flávio, as a senator, made the opposition to vote in favor of it. Bolsonaro once said the proposal was "opportunistic" because it was presented on the eve of the election.

=== Corruption scandals ===
Corruption was a top concern for many voters during the campaign, and a wide-ranging scandal involving politicians and STF justices dominated headlines before the first round. Two cases involved figures from both the government and the opposition.

The Banco Master scandal began when the Central Bank ordered the extrajudicial liquidation of Banco Master on 18 November 2025, citing a severe liquidity crisis and serious violations of financial-system rules. The Federal Police's (PF) Operation Compliance Zero investigates alleged fraud, corruption and money laundering linked to the bank. Its former controlling shareholder, Daniel Vorcaro, was arrested in November 2025, and the PF estimates the total fraud at about R$12 billion. Four public figures have been linked to Vorcaro in the investigations. Senator Flávio Bolsonaro, the opposition's presidential candidate, is under Supreme Court investigation over R$61 million that Vorcaro reportedly paid to finance Dark Horse, a film about his father Jair Bolsonaro; he denies wrongdoing and says the money was private sponsorship. A PF report made public on 1 September 2026 recorded messages attributed to Vorcaro and addressed to justice Alexandre de Moraes, and a R$131 million contract between the bank and the law firm of Moraes's wife; Moraes denies wrongdoing. As of October 2026, the Court had not decided whether to open an investigation into him. Senator Ciro Nogueira, who served as Chief of Staff (Casa Civil) under Jair Bolsonaro, was a target of a search warrant on 7 May 2026 after the PF told the Supreme Court he had received undue advantages from Vorcaro; his defense says he took no part in illicit activities. Senator Jaques Wagner, then the Lula government's leader in the Senate, was a target of the operation's ninth phase on 18 June 2026, and left the leadership post on 24 June; he denied wrongdoing.

The INSS fraud scandal involves unauthorized deductions from the benefits of retirees and pensioners by associations and unions; the PF and the comptroller general estimate that about R$6.3 billion was deducted between 2019 and 2024. Investigators also suspect that INSS employees were paid bribes to supply beneficiaries' data. The case reached the president's circle through the lobbyist Antônio Carlos Camilo Antunes, known as "Careca do INSS", whom the PF identifies as one of the scheme's main operators. Since late July 2026 the Supreme Court has authorized three PF inquiries into president Lula's eldest son, Fábio Luís Lula da Silva (Lulinha), for alleged influence peddling and corruption on behalf of companies dealing with the federal government, including a medical-cannabis firm linked to Antunes. The third inquiry, authorized by justice Flávio Dino, also targets Marco Aurélio Santana Ribeiro, known as "Marcola", who headed Lula's private office (chefe de gabinete) until 21 July. Lulinha is mentioned in the INSS inquiry itself but is not formally investigated there; he denies irregularities and says he did not know of the INSS scheme. Marcola says a R$220,000 payment from the businesswoman Roberta Luchsinger, who is also under investigation, was a loan that has been repaid, with nothing offered in return.

=== Institutional crisis at the Supreme Federal Court ===
On 1 September 2026, justice André Mendonça lifted the confidentiality of a 218-page PF report, produced at his request from the phone of former banker Daniel Vorcaro. The disclosure triggered an institutional crisis at the STF. The report lists messages that the PF attributes to Vorcaro and addressed to justice Alexandre de Moraes, including on 17 November 2025, the day Vorcaro was arrested; it does not include most of the replies attributed to Moraes. It also describes a contract of about R$131 million between Banco Master and the law firm of Moraes's wife, Viviane Barci de Moraes, and does not conclude that Moraes committed a crime. Moraes denied favoring Vorcaro and disputed the authenticity of the messages and the report's chain of custody. The report also mentions prosecutor general Paulo Gonet, citing messages in which the lawyer Ciro Soares appears as an intermediary between him and Vorcaro; Gonet said he had met Vorcaro only once, briefly.

On 3 September, in a decision issued within the Fake News Inquiry, Moraes cited PF intelligence reports to suspect Mendonça of abuse of authority, administrative improbity and crime of responsibility in his handling of the Master and INSS investigations, and asked the court's president, Edson Fachin, to open proceedings against him. On 8 September, Mendonça ordered the preventive removal of the PF's director-general, Andrei Rodrigues, and its intelligence director, Leandro Almada da Costa, alleging that the PF had illegally monitored his work. The next day, 9 September, justice Flávio Dino ordered both officials reinstated. Fachin then suspended the decisions of both Mendonça and Dino, citing the conflicts and procedural overlaps created by the successive rulings, and revoked Moraes's designation as rapporteur of the Fake News Inquiry, taking charge of it himself while preserving the acts already performed. He also moved Moraes's request against Mendonça out of that inquiry into a procedure under the court's presidency, suspended the proceeding on the Vorcaro–Moraes report, and convened an extraordinary plenary session for 15 September to examine, among other points, the legality of Mendonça's order that deepened the analysis of Vorcaro's phone, the validity of the evidence obtained, and the Public Prosecutor's Office's request to annul the procedure.

On 15 September, the plenary met to examine the petition (PET 16662) on whether to open an investigation into Moraes. Justice Nunes Marques declared himself impeded, citing his presidency of the Superior Electoral Court, and justice Dias Toffoli declared himself suspect for reasons of personal conscience (foro íntimo). The court did not reach the merits. It first took up a point of order by justice Gilmar Mendes to merge PET 16662 with PET 16704, which concerns Moraes's request against Mendonça. Fachin, Mendonça, Luiz Fux and Cármen Lúcia voted to keep the cases separate; Gilmar Mendes, Cristiano Zanin and Moraes voted to merge them. Dino also spoke in favor of merging but then requested more time to review the case (pedido de vista) and asked that his position not be counted, leaving a provisional result of 4–3. Dino has up to 90 days to return the case, which would take the resumption to December. On 17 September, Fachin removed PET 16704 from the agenda of the 23 September session, stating that it would be rescheduled at a later date.

=== Concerns about United States interference ===
United States president Donald Trump showed interest in Brazil's elections, and there were concerns that his administration might interfere in favor of Bolsonaro. Members of the United States Senate issued a joint letter to US Secretary of State Marco Rubio saying that his administration was using pressure tactics that could harm Brazil's democracy, and highlighting Darren Beattie's controversial role in the Department of State. They urged the administration to promise to accept the results of the elections in Brazil. Bolsonaro chose to not ask Trump for his endorsement.

Jorge Messias, Lula's attorney general who was unsuccessfully nominated for the STF in 2025, accused the United States of interfering against the Brazilian Supreme Court in a post on X.

In March 2026, through an edict, the TSE contracted to Hughes Telecommunications of Brazil, which would use satellite terminals with the infrastructure of Starlink, which belongs to Elon Musk, to ensure the sending of results from remote areas that do not have conventional data transition infrastructure. This caused controversy due to Musk's ties to the Trump administration, and concerns about data sovereignty.

In October 2026, Intercept Brasil reported that Flavio allegedly paid $600,000 to a US company in order to manipulate the elections.

On 2 October, two days before the first round, foreign embassies in Brazil issued security alerts and advised their citizens in the country to exercise caution. The United States suspended in-person services at its embassy in Brasília and at consulates in the country, citing security concerns but without specifying the alleged threats; in 2022, it had issued a security alert, but the embassy had remained open. The order came from the State Department, headed by Marco Rubio. Following the United States's action, the PF and the Brazilian Intelligence Agency (ABIN) warned of a psychological operation (PSYOP) coordinated by the White House in collusion with Flávio Bolsonaro's campaign, which aimed at a new attempted coup d'état by generating a climate of permanent tension until the first round. This information was obtained by Fórum and confirmed by a "prominent ambassador" in the government. A PF source stated the attempted coup then underway was intended to intervene in the election in favour of a candidate, generating fear and causing people to vote for Bolsonaro or simply not to vote. This "hybrid warfare" would include the participation of big tech companies and was internally referred to by the Brazilian Intelligence System (SISBIN) as Operation Brother Sam II, in reference to the operation related to the 1964 military coup. Intelligence agencies believed the Trump administration's decision, through Marco Rubio, may have been carried out through Eduardo Bolsonaro's intervention. Former Central Intelligence Agency (CIA) employee John Kiriakou stated the spy agency was "potentially intervening" in Brazil's elections in favor of Bolsonaro, declaring there is "credible evidence" of this.

Following the defeat of his ally Flávio Bolsonaro, Donald Trump stated, without presenting any indication or evidence, that the election in Brazil "looked like a rigged election"; when asked whether he would do anything about it, Trump said that he "does not govern Brazil" and that he likes president Lula da Silva. Re-elected vice president Geraldo Alckmin criticised Trump's statement, calling it misguided. The United States government had postponed the release of an official statement on the result after Bolsonaro questioned Lula's victory and called for the election to be annulled; the statement had already been prepared and congratulated Brazilians on holding the election. According to international relations researcher Ricardo Leães, Lula's victory blocks Trump's plans in Latin America to "dominate the entire subcontinent and appropriate all the resources".

=== Second round endorsements ===
Endorsements from first-round candidates
First-round candidate	First round	Endorsement	Ref.
Augusto Cury	2.89%	Flávio Bolsonaro	
Renan Santos	2.24%	No endorsement	
Ronaldo Caiado	2.18%	Flávio Bolsonaro	
Romeu Zema	0.27%	Flávio Bolsonaro	
Samara Martins	0.10%	Luiz Inácio Lula da Silva	
Hertz Dias	0.04%	Luiz Inácio Lula da Silva	
Clariana Barão	0.03%	Flávio Bolsonaro	
Edmilson Costa	0.02%	Luiz Inácio Lula da Silva	
Wilson Grassi	0.01%	Flávio Bolsonaro	
Rui Costa Pimenta	0.01%	No endorsement	

Party endorsements in the second round
Candidate	Parties	Ref.
Luiz Inácio Lula da Silva	PT	
Luiz Inácio Lula da Silva	PCdoB	
Luiz Inácio Lula da Silva	PV	
Luiz Inácio Lula da Silva	PSOL	
Luiz Inácio Lula da Silva	REDE	
Luiz Inácio Lula da Silva	PSB	
Luiz Inácio Lula da Silva	PDT	
Luiz Inácio Lula da Silva	PSTU	
Luiz Inácio Lula da Silva	PCB	
Luiz Inácio Lula da Silva	UP	
Luiz Inácio Lula da Silva	Agir	
Flávio Bolsonaro	PL	
Flávio Bolsonaro	UNIÃO	
Flávio Bolsonaro	PP	
Flávio Bolsonaro	Republicanos	
Flávio Bolsonaro	PODE	
Flávio Bolsonaro	NOVO	
Flávio Bolsonaro	MDB (Note: While the official party's position was to endorse Flávio Bolsonaro, 10 of the party's state directories declared support for Lula in the second round.)	
No endorsement	PSD (Note: While the official party's position was not to endorse either presidential candidate in the second round, presidential candidate Ronaldo Caiado publicly announced his support for Bolsonaro.)	
No endorsement	PSDB	
No endorsement	PRD	
No endorsement	Solidarity	
No endorsement	Cidadania	
No endorsement	PRTB	
No endorsement	PCO	

== Debates ==
Debates broadcast on television or radio were legally required to invite all candidates whose parties or coalitions had at least five members in the National Congress based on the previous election. Lula, Bolsonaro, Caiado and Cury satisfied this criterion. Debate organizers could also choose to invite additional candidates. Shortly before the last debate for the first round, judges granted injunctions ordering the debate organizers to also invite Zema and Santos.

No.	Date, time and location (Note: Times are in UTC−03:00.)	Organizations	Moderators	Participants						
Key: P Present A Absent I Invited N Not invited				Lula PT	Bolsonaro PL	Caiado PSD	Cury Avante	Zema NOVO	Santos Missão	Martins UP
1.1	23 August 2026, 20:00, São Paulo	Bandeirantes, Cultura, Gazeta, Jovem Pan, Estadão	Adriana Araújo, Eduardo Oinegue	A	A	P	P	A	P	N
–	14 September 2026, 22:00, Osasco	SBT, CNN Brasil, RedeTV!, Redevida, Exame, Metrópoles, Novabrasil, Itatiaia, Terra, Veja	Celso Freitas, Mariana Demori	Canceled						
–	14 September 2026, 20:00, São Paulo	MathiasTV	Paulo Mathias	Canceled						
1.2	18 September 2026, 19:00, São Paulo	Inteligência Ltda., Metrópoles, G4	Rogério Vilela	A	A	A	P	P	A	P
1.3	21 September 2026, 19:00, São Paulo	Flow Podcast	Igor Rodrigues Coelho	A	A	P	P	P	A	N
1.4	23 September 2026, 20:00, São Paulo	Veja, Rede Brasil	Marcela Rahal	A	A	P	A	P	A	N
–	27 September 2026, 21:00, São Paulo	Record	Eduardo Ribeiro	Canceled						
–	1 October 2026, 21:00, Rio de Janeiro	Globo	César Tralli	Canceled						
–	11 October 2026, 21:00, São Paulo	Record	–	Canceled		Out				
–	15 October 2026, Osasco	SBT, CNN Brasil, RedeTV!, Redevida, Exame, Metrópoles, Novabrasil, Itatiaia, Terra, Veja	–	Canceled		Out				
2.1	18 October 2026, 20:00, São Paulo	Bandeirantes, Cultura, Gazeta, Jovem Pan, Estadão	Adriana Araújo, Eduardo Oinegue	P	P	Out				
2.2	23 October 2026, 21:30, Rio de Janeiro	Globo	César Tralli	P	P	Out				

Lula during the 18 October debate, described as "chaotic"

14 September: The debate in Osasco was canceled due to the fact that Lula and Bolsonaro had not confirmed their attendance by the 7 September deadline. The debate in São Paulo was canceled because all the candidates, except Renan Santos, either failed to confirm or canceled their participation.

27 September: The debate was canceled due to the fact that Lula and Bolsonaro had not confirmed their attendance.

1 October: Initially, the candidates whose participation is required by law were invited: Lula, Bolsonaro, Ronaldo Caiado and Augusto Cury. On 29 September, the president of the Superior Electoral Court, Justice Nunes Marques, ruled that Romeu Zema's participation should also be guaranteed, since his party currently holds five seats in the Chamber of Deputies. The next day, 30 September, Lula confirmed he would not take part in the debate. On 1 October, just hours before the debate, TSE Justice Estela Aranha suspended a rule agreed upon by all campaigns, under which an absent candidate would be represented by an empty podium, and the other candidates could direct questions to it. Moments later, Bolsonaro withdrew from the debate, citing "censorship imposed by the TSE". Shortly afterward, STF Justice Gilmar Mendes granted an injunction guaranteeing Renan Santos's participation in the debate. Following this series of court rulings, Globo decided to cancel the debate less than an hour before it was due to begin.

11 October: The debate was canceled due to scheduling conflicts on the part of both candidates.

15 October: The debate was canceled due to scheduling conflicts on the part of both candidates. Instead, Lula and Bolsonaro took part in Globo's candidate interviews on 15 and 16 October, respectively.

18 October: The first debate between the final two contenders was described as "chaotic" and characterized by personal attacks; for instance, Bolsonaro declined to stand closer to Lula out of fear that "his wallet would be stolen". At one point during the debate, Lula questioned Bolsonaro about why he had opposed the arrest of Bruno Dias Delaroli, who shot and killed 5-year-old Ana Clara Machado in 2021. Bolsonaro ignored the question and taunted Lula by asking him, without clarifying the source of the figures, why 73% of prisoners had supposedly voted for him. (Note: The Brazilian constitution suspends the political rights of people convicted by a final and unappealable court decision. Polling stations set up in prisons and juvenile detention facilities include prison system workers, institutionalised adolescents and pretrial detainees, not the entire prison population.) Lula replied, "I want 100% to vote for me. Even your father"; BBC considered this one of the most tense moments of the debate. In another notable incident, Bolsonaro wrote the word corrupto ("corrupt") on the palm of his hand to point out that it contained the letters "PT"; however, the quip backfired, with Lula supporters deliberately misinterpreting the gesture as a confession rather than an accusation.

Lula during the Globo debate

23 October: During the debate on Globo, Bolsonaro mocked the fact Lula had lost a finger in a workplace accident at the age of 17. Lula demanded Bolsonaro apologise for the remark, stating that "I will not take home" that "great piece of nonsense", since his opponent "has never worked a day in his life". According to qualitative research conducted by Lula's campaign, the president's response was his best moment during the debate, generating negative repercussions for Bolsonaro and helping to highlight Lula's personal background. Writing for Folha de S.Paulo, Jairo Marques stated Bolsonaro's remark provoked indignation over prejudice against people with disabilities, and linked the episode to images of elderly people being assisted in reaching their polling stations, although he acknowledged he could not assert it had had a significant numerical effect. Comedian Antonio Tabet later revealed he had participated in Lula's re-election campaign, helping to write the president's response; this was confirmed by André Janones.

== Opinion polls ==
Since the 2022 Brazilian general election, polling companies have published surveys tracking national voting intention for the 2026 presidential election. The results of these surveys are listed below in reverse chronological order, and include candidates who frequently polled above 3% and are registered in a party, as well as eligible by the Superior Electoral Court of Brazil. They also include candidates from parties that passed the electoral threshold (Note: The electoral threshold in 2022 required each party to obtain at least 2% of the valid votes for the Chamber of Deputies nationwide, with a minimum of 1% in one-third of the states (nine states), or to elect at least 11 federal deputies distributed across nine states.) in 2022, and therefore have access to public campaign funding, free radio and television advertising time, and the right to participate in debates.

== Results ==
Candidate	Running mate	Party	First round		Second round	
Candidate	Running mate	Party	Votes	%	Votes	%
Luiz Inácio Lula da Silva	Geraldo Alckmin (PSB)	Workers' Party	53,879,538	45.16	64,256,232	51.79
Flávio Bolsonaro	Alfredo Gaspar	Liberal Party	56,104,503	47.03	59,826,041	48.21
Augusto Cury	Júlio Delgado	Avante	3,448,569	2.89		
Renan Santos	Aroldo Medina	Mission Party	2,675,887	2.24		
Ronaldo Caiado	Gilberto Kassab	Social Democratic Party	2,605,148	2.18		
Romeu Zema	Eduardo Girão	New Party	326,488	0.27		
Samara Martins	Raquel Brício	Popular Unity	122,911	0.10		
Hertz Dias	Vanessa Portugal	United Socialist Workers' Party	43,103	0.04		
Clariana Barão	Fabiana Torquato	Christian Democracy	40,043	0.03		
Edmilson Costa	Cleusa Santos	Brazilian Communist Party	22,693	0.02		
Wilson Grassi	Suêd Haidar	Democrata	16,881	0.01		
Rui Costa Pimenta	Antônio Carlos	Workers' Cause Party	15,024	0.01		
Total			119,300,788	100.00	124,082,273	100.00
Valid votes			119,300,788	95.23	124,082,273	96.76
Invalid votes			3,674,249	2.93	2,723,305	2.12
Blank votes			2,300,798	1.84	1,430,496	1.12
Total votes			125,275,835	100.00	128,236,074	100.00
Registered voters/turnout			158,745,502	78.92	158,745,502	80.78
Source: Superior Electoral Court

=== Results by federative unit ===
Federative unit	Second round				First round											
Federative unit	Lula		Bolsonaro		Bolsonaro		Lula		Cury		Santos		Caiado		Others	
Federative unit	Votes	%	Votes	%	Votes	%	Votes	%	Votes	%	Votes	%	Votes	%	Votes	%
Acre	144,513	33.43	287,715	66.57	302,807	64.56	134,770	28.73	13,523	2.88	7,980	1.70	8,594	1.83	1,392	0.30
Alagoas	1,152,621	60.77	744,140	39.23	735,718	40.45	995,459	54.73	42,427	2.33	26,851	1.48	14,198	0.78	4,203	0.23
Amapá	222,968	52.88	198,674	47.12	212,278	45.67	212,503	45.71	19,057	4.10	11,342	2.44	8,304	1.79	1,374	0.30
Amazonas	1,145,783	54.02	975,245	45.98	976,764	45.00	1,046,996	48.23	77,531	3.57	35,411	1.63	28,310	1.30	5,751	0.26
Bahia	6,485,258	71.31	2,608,761	28.69	2,442,585	28.53	5,664,771	66.17	195,451	2.28	117,518	1.37	122,705	1.43	17,261	0.20
Ceará	4,036,124	68.93	1,819,478	31.07	1,756,850	31.27	3,555,263	63.29	140,524	2.50	107,587	1.92	45,604	0.81	11,986	0.21
Espírito Santo	1,001,965	43.63	1,294,504	56.37	1,233,194	54.78	850,028	37.76	65,121	2.89	53,236	2.36	39,097	1.74	10,402	0.46
Federal District	825,224	45.72	979,542	54.28	909,616	51.31	675,627	38.11	45,979	2.59	46,714	2.64	85,076	4.80	9,796	0.55
Goiás	1,585,555	40.34	2,345,334	59.66	2,051,888	53.60	1,188,880	31.06	53,849	1.41	54,105	1.41	472,041	12.33	7,060	0.18
Maranhão	2,808,231	69.54	1,229,971	30.46	1,239,040	30.90	2,566,301	63.99	84,830	2.12	60,387	1.51	50,155	1.25	9,726	0.24
Mato Grosso	694,167	33.94	1,351,099	66.06	1,298,581	65.15	581,681	29.18	40,019	2.01	33,170	1.66	33,079	1.66	6,758	0.34
Mato Grosso do Sul	628,973	40.40	927,892	59.60	873,351	58.60	516,855	34.68	39,148	2.63	31,847	2.14	23,291	1.56	5,786	0.39
Minas Gerais	6,351,099	50.43	6,241,786	49.57	5,777,548	48.24	5,188,936	43.33	409,737	3.42	247,209	2.06	230,423	1.92	122,382	1.02
Pará	2,690,449	55.02	2,199,940	44.98	2,163,957	44.50	2,427,237	49.91	125,172	2.57	84,165	1.73	51,991	1.07	10,650	0.22
Paraíba	1,794,059	67.46	865,210	32.54	831,377	33.07	1,541,127	61.31	73,831	2.94	42,247	1.68	19,511	0.78	5,654	0.22
Paraná	2,566,504	37.42	4,291,444	62.58	3,945,345	59.91	2,054,597	31.20	205,095	3.11	177,434	2.69	171,294	2.60	31,478	0.48
Pernambuco	4,117,513	69.20	1,832,554	30.80	1,738,043	31.03	3,553,971	63.45	137,960	2.46	85,865	1.53	73,176	1.31	12,002	0.21
Piauí	1,653,989	75.88	525,859	24.12	517,028	24.09	1,523,710	70.99	47,692	2.22	32,274	1.50	21,629	1.01	4,061	0.19
Rio de Janeiro	4,565,393	46.90	5,169,033	53.10	4,966,844	53.01	3,693,021	39.41	247,397	2.64	211,843	2.26	199,844	2.13	50,751	0.54
Rio Grande do Norte	1,413,596	65.72	737,409	34.28	720,493	34.77	1,237,963	59.75	57,367	2.77	35,261	1.70	16,407	0.79	4,407	0.21
Rio Grande do Sul	2,824,552	42.16	3,874,378	57.84	3,573,783	55.64	2,294,759	35.73	195,296	3.04	167,558	2.61	158,821	2.47	32,829	0.51
Rondônia	294,446	30.39	674,382	69.61	652,988	67.45	250,667	25.89	25,280	2.61	19,187	1.98	16,929	1.75	3,008	0.31
Roraima	83,505	27.54	219,675	72.46	231,322	71.06	74,420	22.86	8,579	2.64	6,623	2.03	3,639	1.12	962	0.30
Santa Catarina	1,418,314	30.58	3,220,071	69.42	3,000,020	66.65	1,127,168	25.04	134,273	2.98	132,795	2.95	79,911	1.78	26,730	0.59
São Paulo	12,119,274	46.15	14,139,178	53.85	12,922,023	51.93	9,505,413	38.20	892,368	3.59	804,310	3.23	579,571	2.33	179,263	0.72
Sergipe	989,041	69.53	433,354	30.47	417,839	30.63	856,019	62.75	38,895	2.85	21,405	1.57	26,651	1.95	3,387	0.25
Tocantins	442,962	48.63	467,916	51.37	469,321	50.44	404,009	43.42	22,434	2.41	12,983	1.40	20,189	2.17	1,511	0.16
Abroad	200,154	53.86	171,497	46.14	143,900	43.49	157,387	47.57	9,734	2.94	8,580	2.59	4,708	1.42	6,573	1.99
Total	64,256,232	51.79	59,826,041	48.21	56,104,503	47.03	53,879,538	45.16	3,448,569	2.89	2,675,887	2.24	2,605,148	2.18	587,143	1.05
Source: Superior Electoral Court

== Aftermath ==
Lula celebrating the victory alongside re-elected vice president Geraldo Alckmin

=== Reactions ===
At 9:08 p.m. (UTC−03:00) on election day, the Superior Electoral Court (TSE) confirmed Lula da Silva's victory, when 97% of the ballot boxes had been counted. He became the first person to be elected president of Brazil four times and the first to win a presidential election in a runoff after placing second in the first round.

A victory by Lula had been seen as unlikely following the first round results, and commentators had fit a potential Bolsonaro victory into a wider trend across Latin America in which voters had "punished [left-wing] incumbents and turned to the right", as exemplified by recent elections in Argentina in 2023, Chile in 2025, and Colombia in 2026. In explaining Lula's victory, political observers noted the result in Minas Gerais, a state which has been a bellwether in every presidential election since 1989, where Lula trailed by 6 points in the first round but won by 1 point in the runoff. The turnout also increased from about 79% in the first round to about 81% in the runoff, which analysts said was favorable to Lula; both Lula and Bolsonaro focused their runoff campaigns on mobilizing their supporters to turn out, especially with digital advertisements. O Globo highlighted the role of politician André Janones who created the WhatsApp channel Exército do Lula (lit. "Lula's Army"), which amassed over 10 million followers and became Brazil's second biggest WhatsApp channel, most of whom joined between the first round and the runoff. According to the newspaper Metrópoles, Janones is the most significant political leader to have emerged from the last two presidential elections in Brazil, and Lula would not have secured his fourth term without his "decisive" role in the campaign. The day after Lula's victory, Janones was invited to help Pedro Sánchez in the Spanish elections.

Lula addressing crowd after the victory

Bolsonaro refused to concede the election, saying he felt that "it is impossible to recognize the election result given how these events unfolded", referring to a decision by STF justice Cristiano Zanin to postpone poll closing from 17:00 to 19:00. Both campaigns had requested for voting hours to be extended in specific areas; Lula's campaign pointed to shortages of public buses and other transportation problems in São Paulo as well as throughout the Northeast Region, while Bolsonaro's campaign pointed to heavy rains and flooding in the south. The orders to extend came in at around 5PM, when many polling stations in Brasilia had already closed. Bolsonaro cited the decision to extend voting hours as his reason to not accept the result of the election, saying his campaign would legally challenge the results.

Two days after the victory, Lula celebrated his 81st birthday.

In announcing the results, TSE president Nunes Marques, who had been appointed by Jair Bolsonaro, said that the extension of voting hours did not impact the result of the election. Analysis by Pedro Burgos, an Insper professor and specialist in data journalism, found that only 34,330 votes, or 0.03% of the total, were registered after the original closing time, while Lula's margin of victory was 4.43 million votes. The large majority of voting machines had been switched off by 17:00.

Analysts noted that an annulment of the election was unlikely, and that Flávio Bolsonaro's refusal to accept the result of the election echoed that of Jair Bolsonaro in the 2022 election. São Paulo Governor Tarcísio de Freitas, a prominent Bolsonaro ally, called on Bolsonaro to "respect the election results and move on". Senator Rogério Marinho, who co-ordinated the Bolsonaro campaign, said there was "no evidence" of fraud.

=== Flávio Bolsonaro flees to the United States ===
The day after his defeat, Flávio Bolsonaro was summoned by the PF to surrender his passport, pursuant to an order issued by STF justice Alexandre de Moraes. Moraes based his decision on a statement by Flávio's brother, Eduardo Bolsonaro, who said that in the event of defeat Flávio should leave Brazil. He was also prohibited from having contact with Willer Tomaz, who like him was under investigation for money laundering in a scheme that allegedly involved online gambling companies. Earlier that day, at least three federal deputies—Duda Salabert, Otoni de Paula and Rogério Correia—had requested the seizure of the senator's passports, noting he would lose his immunity at the end of the year and was the subject of three investigations on suspicion of, among other offenses, corruption and foreign exchange evasion. Moraes's decision to cancel Bolsonaro's passports was privately criticized by fellow STF justices and members of Lula's government; according to them, Moraes had made a political mistake and thrown "gasoline on a fire" and that it would have been better to let Bolsonaro flee, if that was indeed his plan, to make it clear he was evading Brazilian justice, without being able to claim he was a "victim of political persecution".

On 27 October, Infobae reported that Bolsonaro had allegedly fled Brazil the previous night, heading for Argentina, from where he would continue his journey to the United States. He had reportedly crossed the border using his national identity document and was to board a Gulfstream G400 registered as LV-JQW, operated by the company Baires Fly, in Puerto Iguazú. Bolsonaro had earlier stated he had "never thought about leaving the country". Flávio Bolsonaro's getaway private jet belonged to a company used by Argentine president Javier Milei. Following the news of the alleged flight, the PF contacted Argentine authorities, who did not provide precise information about Bolsonaro's entry into Argentina; furthermore, he had been prohibited from leaving Brazil. Brazilian newspapers Metrópoles, Folha de S.Paulo, channel CNN Brasil and British agency Reuters informed that close relatives and allies confirmed his defection from the country on his way to Miami, Florida.

Bolsonaro received assistance on his way to Argentina from a former Mossad agent, Israel's intelligence agency, who had become a naturalized U.S. citizen; in Argentina, he was helped by members of Milei's government, and his private jet was arranged by Jason Miller, a political strategist for Donald Trump. On 28 October, Bolsonaro landed at Miami–Opa Locka Executive Airport. He and his family are expected to receive visas from the State Department.

After arriving in the US, Bolsonaro published a statement on his X account declaring himself "president-elect" of Brazil. The statement featured an older Brazilian coat of arms (used between 1889–1930), which described the country as "Estados Unidos do Brazil" (Portuguese for United States of Brazil). He later deleted the post and republished it with his title changed to "leader" and the current coat of arms instead of the older one. Liberal Party President Valdemar Costa Neto rejected Bolsonaro's declaration. Bolsonaro's claims were mocked in conservative newspapers such as O Estado de S. Paulo and O Globo.

The removal of the expression "true president-elect" from the coup-like letter was ordered by the US government, as it could have caused diplomatic difficulties between the two countries. According to Paulo Figueiredo, influencer and grandson of the last president of the Brazilian military dictatorship, João Figueiredo, the incorrect coat of arms and Bolsonaro's self-proclamation were caused by ChatGPT's artificial intelligence.

== See also ==
- Bolsonarism
- Lulism
- 2022 Brazilian presidential election
