= Brazilian diaspora =

Migration of Brazilians from Brazil to other countries

Diáspora brasileira
- Flag of Brazil

Total population
- 5.18 million (2024)

Regions with significant populations
- United States: 2,085,000 (2023)
- Portugal: 513,000 (2023)
- Paraguay: 263,200 (2023)
- United Kingdom: 230,000 (2023)
- Japan: 210,470 (2023)
- Germany: 170,400 (2023)
- Spain: 161,944 (2023)
- Italy: 159,000 (2023)
- Canada: 143,500 (2023)
- Argentina: 101,502 (2023)
- France: 95,000 (2023)
- French Guiana: 92,493 (2023)
- Ireland: 80,000 (2023)
- Netherlands: 80,000 (2023)
- Switzerland: 64,000 (2023)
- Belgium: 50,000 (2023)
- Australia: 48,180 (2023)
- Uruguay: 31,050 (2023)
- Bolivia: 75,500 (2023)
- Mexico: 32,700 (2023)
- Suriname: 30,000 (2023)
- Lebanon: 22,000 (2023)
- Chile: 19,500 (2023)
- Sweden: 20,000 (2023)
- Israel: 14,000 (2023)
- Angola: 25,000 (2023)
- Venezuela: 11,500 (2023)
- Guyana: 11,900 (2023)
- Norway: 11,000 (2023)
- Other countries combined: 87,577

Languages
- Portuguese (99.7%); Indigenous languages (0.082%)

The Brazilian diaspora is the migration of Brazilians to other countries, a mostly recent phenomenon that has been driven mainly by economic recession and hyperinflation that afflicted Brazil in the 1980s and early 1990s, and since 2014, by the political and economic crisis that culminated in the impeachment of Dilma Rousseff in 2016 and the election of Jair Bolsonaro in 2018, as well as the re-election of Luiz Inácio Lula da Silva in 2022, in addition to chronic violence in Brazilian urban centers.

There are an estimated 5,18 million Brazilians living abroad, mainly in the U.S. (1,905,000), Paraguay (245,850), Portugal (275,000), United Kingdom (220,000), Japan (212,325), Spain (165,000), Italy (162,000), Germany (138,955) and Canada (122,400).

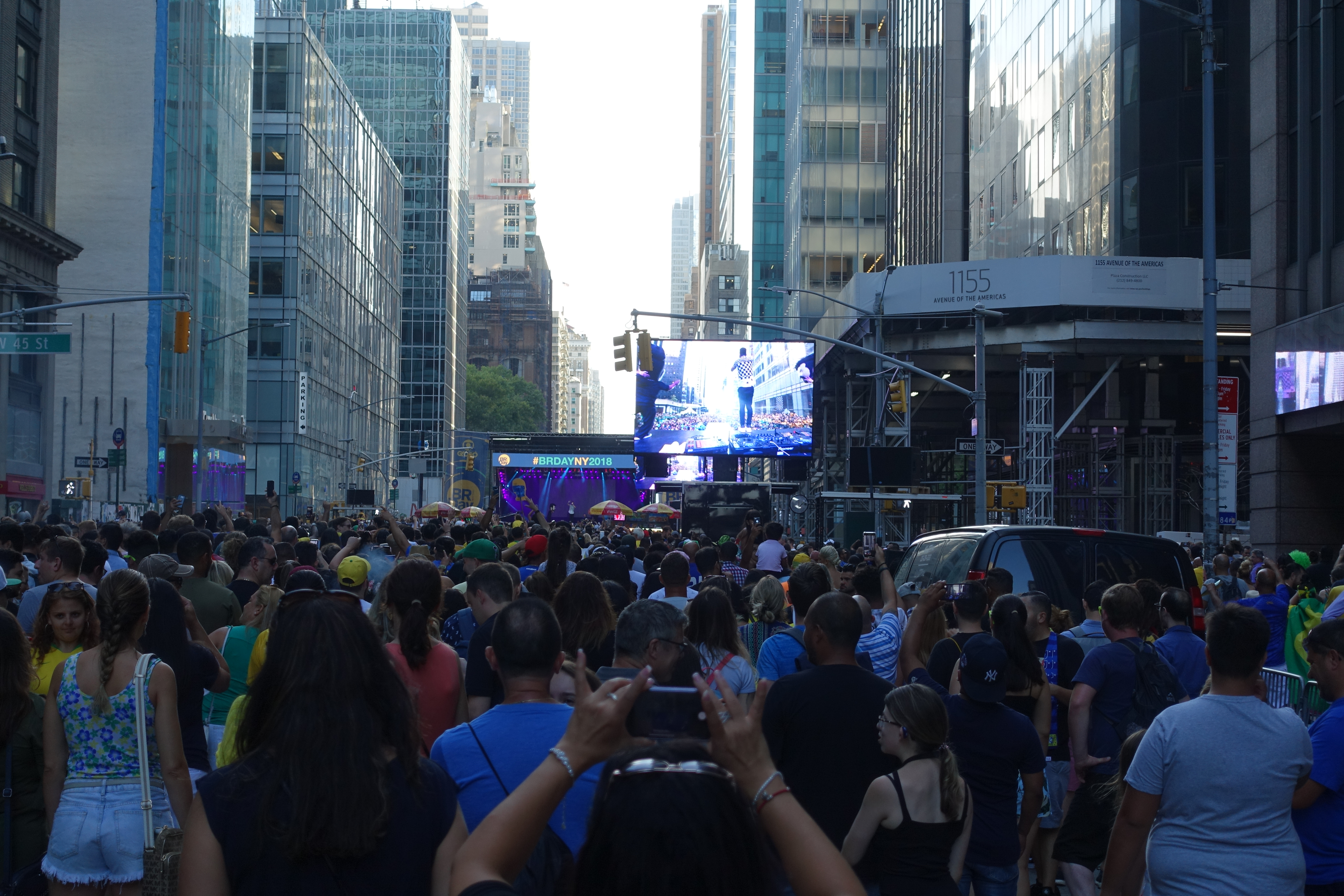
Brazilian Day celebration in New York City

== America ==
=== United States ===
There were an estimated 246,000 Brazilian Americans as of 2007. Another source gives an estimate of some 800,000 Brazilians living in the U.S. in 2000, while still another estimates that as of 2008 some 1,100,000 Brazilians live in the United States, 300,000 of them in Florida. As of 2022, Brazil's Ministry of Foreign Affairs estimates some 1,905,000 Brazilians living in the United States. Major concentrations are in Massachusetts, New York, New Jersey, Connecticut, Pennsylvania, Georgia, Florida, Wisconsin, and California.

West 46th Street has historically been a commercial center for Brazilians living or visiting New York City. In 1995 the city officially recognized it as "Little Brazil Street".

In Massachusetts, there is significant concentration of Brazilian immigrants in the town of Framingham, which in recent years has spilt out into the neighboring towns of Marlborough and Hudson, among others. In the Brazilian community, it is said that Pompano Beach in Florida has the greatest concentration of Brazilians in the USA. The Brazilian communities in these towns are vibrant, having contributed much to the local cuisine and culture, but Brazilian immigrants often feel discriminated against and are often thought to be illegal immigrants by their non-Brazilian neighbors.

A disproportionate number of Brazilians who have emigrated to the US came from the town of Governador Valadares, in the state of Minas Gerais.

In New Jersey, there are almost 15,000 of Brazilian ancestry in Essex County. The Brazilian diaspora has impacted the lifestyle of this county. They have built a community based on diversity and relatability. Creating a new home to replicate their pátria mãe (motherland). In Newark New Jersey, there is an area referred to as the Ironbound. This is a heavily populated area by Brazilians because there was an influx of migrants.

=== Canada ===
There are an estimated 122,000 Brazilians living in Canada. Major concentrations are in Toronto, Montreal, Vancouver, Brampton, and Calgary.

=== Paraguay ===
Brazilians and their descendants living in Paraguay are called Brasiguayos. This numerous community of landowners is mainly involved in agriculture.

== Asia ==
=== Japan ===
The majority of Brazilians living in Japan are of Japanese descent, and the Immigration Act was altered to allow children and grandchildren of Japanese nationals, as well as their non-Japanese spouse, to receive a work permit easily. Reasons for the migration of Brazilians were mainly economic. Brazilians sought out opportunities to improve their life, escape unemployment, and also to support their family. In contrast, cultural factors were considered not important as a reason for migrating to Japan. Most of them live in industrial areas where there used to be a plenty of job offers at factories, such as Aichi, Shizuoka and Gunma Prefectures, among others. While approximately 300,000 Brazilians lived there at its climax, the economic crisis in 2008 slashed their job and more than a third of them have decided to return to Brazil. As of June 2024, there were 212,325 Brazilian nationals in Japan.

== Europe ==
=== United Kingdom ===
There are no precise figures for the number of Brazilians living in the UK. The 1991 Census recorded 9,301 Brazilian-born people in the UK, and the 2001 Census recorded 15,215. In 2004, the Brazilian Consulate in London recorded 13,000 Brazilians who had voluntarily registered themselves with them, but said this was not an accurate figure for the number living in the UK; the Brazilian Embassy estimated that figure to be about 80,000. The Office for National Statistics estimates suggest that there were 56,000 Brazilian-born people resident in the UK in 2008. In 2015, the Brazilian Consulate estimated a total of 120,000 Brazilians resident in the UK. The ONS estimated that in 2018, 87,000 people born in Brazil were living in the UK. As of 2022, about 220,000 Brazilians live in United Kingdom.

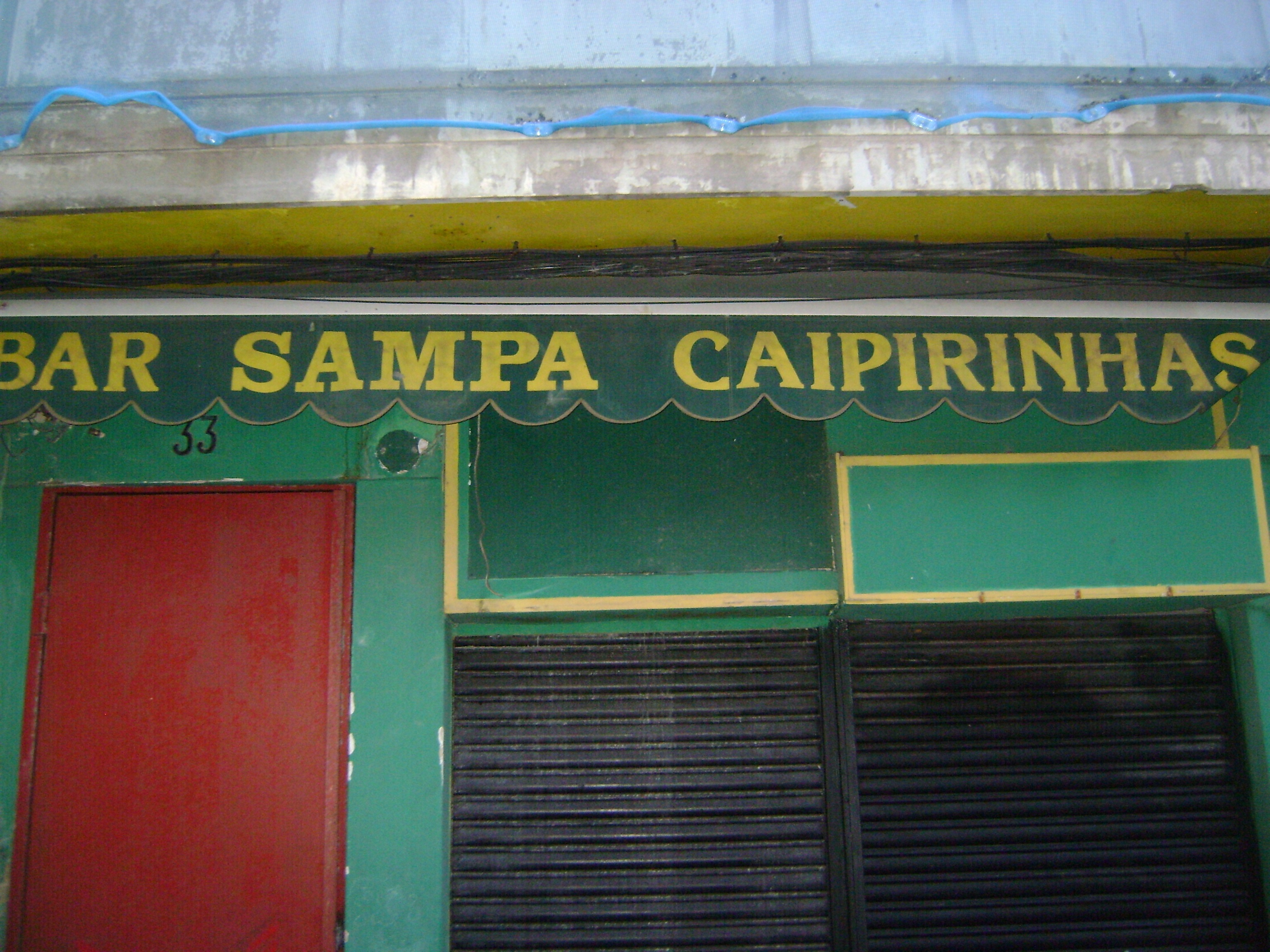
Brazilian bar in A Coruña, Galicia, (Spain).

=== Germany ===
The 2022 estimates from Brazil's Ministry of Foreign Affairs shows 138,955 Brazilians living in Germany.

=== Portugal ===
Portugal has grown to be a popular destination for Brazilian migrants because of their similar language and culture. The very simple procedure for Brazilians to obtain Portuguese citizenship is one of the main causes. Many Brazilians have been able to obtain dual nationality after Portugal changed its nationality rules to permit any grandchild of a certified Portuguese citizen to apply for citizenship, which has increased the number of Brazilians migrating to Portugal. Portugal is a desirable travel destination because of this legislation as well as the cultural similarities between the two nations. Brazilian pop culture is also well known to the Portuguese, which facilitates the assimilation of Brazilian immigrants.

As a result, Brazilians make up a sizable portion of the immigrant population in Portugal, accounting for almost 25% of all foreign residents. Since the mid-2010s, there has been an increase in the number of qualified professionals, including engineers, IT specialists, and health workers. Even though a large number of Brazilian immigrants have advanced degrees, they frequently struggle to find employment that matches their skills, which occasionally forces them to work in industries like construction, services, or elder care. Despite these difficulties, Portugal's friendly atmosphere, pleasant temperature, and tranquil way of life draw a lot of migrants. Portuguese social and economic life is significantly influenced by the Brazilian community, which is still thriving, especially in Lisbon, Porto, and Setúbal.

=== Switzerland ===
There is a large population of Brazilians present in Switzerland although the exact number is difficult to pinpoint due to a majority of them being undocumented. The Switzerland Federal Department of Statistics has the population of Brazilians residing in Switzerland to 14,108, but the Brazil Ministry of Foreign Relations has the number close to 60,000 Brazilians in Switzerland.

=== Ireland ===
During the late 1990s Brazilians migrated to Ireland to work in meat processing shops in small towns due to the severe labour shortages that was present during the time, a majority of them were considered undocumented. Brazilians in Ireland were also mistreated by certain business owners, preferably towards the ones who barely spoke English and were undocumented. For example, in a certain case which saw five Brazilians sue a plant owner due to having worked long hours, weren't being paid what was promised, and receiving illegal deductions from their wages. It's also been reported that some Brazilians in the late 2000s were being paid around €5 an hour for an 8-hour working day which significantly below the minimum average at around €8.30.

The total amount of Brazilians that were present in Ireland from the years 2002-2013 was clocked in at 8,704 which came from the Ireland census.

== Politics ==
=== 2026 ===
Federative unit	Bolsonaro		Lula		Cury		Santos		Caiado		Zema		Martins		Dias		Barão		Costa		Grassi		Pimenta	
Federative unit	Votes	%																						
Abroad	143,900	43.49	157,387	47.57	9,734	2.94	8,580	2.59	4,708	1.42	3,329	1.01	1,053	0.32	373	0.11	825	0.25	421	0.13	373	0.11	199	0.06
Total	56,104,503	47.03	53,879,538	45.16	3,448,569	2.89	2,675,887	2.24	2,605,148	2.18	326,488	0.27	122,911	0.10	43,103	0.04	40,043	0.10	22,693	0.02	16,881	0.01	15,024	0.01
Source: Superior Electoral Court

=== 2022 ===
Votes by federative unit
Federative unit	Second round				First round									
Federative unit	Luiz Inácio Lula da Silva		Jair Bolsonaro		Luiz Inácio Lula da Silva		Jair Bolsonaro		Simone Tebet		Ciro Gomes		Others	
Federative unit	Votes	%	Votes	%	Votes	%	Votes	%	Votes	%	Votes	%	Votes	%
Abroad	152,905	51.28	145,264	48.72	138,933	47.17	122,548	41.61	13,167	4.47	13,341	4.53	6,536	2.22

=== 2018 ===
Department	Bolsonaro		Haddad	
Department	Votes	%	Votes	%
Diaspora	131,671	71.02%	53,730	28.98%
Source: G1

Department	Bolsonaro		Haddad		Gomes		Alckmin		Others	
Department	Votes	%	Votes	%	Votes	%	Votes	%	Votes	%
Diaspora	113,690	58.79%	19,540	10.10%	28,073	14.52%	6,668	3.45%	25,410	13.14%
Source: G1

== Statistics ==
A world map showing the estimated distribution and concentration of people of Brazilian descent or ancestry by country.: Brazil + 1,000,000 + 100,000 / + 10,000 + 1,000 No data

	Brazilian diaspora per consulate in 2022		
Place	Consulate	Country	Population
1	Boston	United States	380,000
2	New York City	United States	500,000
3	Miami	United States	475,000
4	Ciudad del Este	Paraguay	98,000
5	Paris	France	90,100^{12}
6	London	United Kingdom	220,000
7	Los Angeles	United States	115,000
8	Atlanta	United States	120,000
9	Nagoya	Japan	119,298
10	Houston	United States	90,000
11	Hartford	United States	70,000
12	Lisbon	Portugal	180,000
13	San Francisco	United States	65,000
14	Chicago	United States	45,000
15	Milan	Italy	92,000^{10}
16	Tokyo	Japan	56,079
17	Zurich	Switzerland	37,000^{15}
18	Madrid	Spain	90,000
19	Brussels	Belgium	32,000^{5}
20	Asunción	Paraguay	48,000
21	Buenos Aires	Argentina	80,000
22	Salto do Guairá	Paraguay	30,000
23	Cayenne	French Guiana	80,000
24	Munich	Germany	51,000
25	Washington D.C.	United States	45,000
26	Barcelona	Spain	75,000^{8}
27	Berlin	Germany	40,000
28	Porto	Portugal	70,000
29	Geneve	Switzerland	40,000
30	Encarnación	Paraguay	33,500
31	Hamamatsu	Japan	30,882
32	Sydney	Australia	45,000^{37}
33	Bogotá	Colombia	4,065
34	Amsterdam	Netherlands	65,000
35	Toronto	Canada	90,000
36	Faro	Portugal	25,000
37	Rome	Italy	70,000^{10}
38	Dublin	Ireland	70,000
39	Frankfurt	Germany	47,955
40	Beirut	Lebanon	21,000
41	Luanda	Angola	13,290
42	Georgetown	Guyana	10,000
43	Paramaribo	Suriname	30,000
44	Mexico City	Mexico	40,000
45	Leticia	Colombia	4,000
46	Santa Cruz de la Sierra	Bolivia	20,000
47	Caracas	Venezuela	11,800^{1}
48	Montreal	Canada	12,400
49	Canberra	Australia	15,000^{36}
50	Pedro Juan Caballero	Paraguay	29,000
51	Santiago	Chile	18,644
52	Tel Aviv	Israel	15,000
54	Abu Dhabi	United Arab Emirates	6,000
55	Vancouver	Canada	15,000
56	ShanghaI	China	1,153
57	Oslo	Norway	10,698^{9}
58	Cochabamba	Bolivia	6,500
59	Guangzhou	China	3,500
60	Montevideo	Uruguay	15,000
61	Stockholm	Sweden	17,000^{14}
62	Maputo	Mozambique	3,029^{22}
63	Wellington	New Zealand	6,663^{38}
64	Ramallah	Palestine	6,000
65	Vienna	Austria	8^{5}
66	Saint-Georges	French Guiana	2,500
67	Cobija	Bolivia	4,000
68	Concepción	Paraguay	7,350
69	Athens	Greece	4,000
70	Copenhagen	Denmark	4,800^{7}
71	Lima	Peru	6,572
72	Quito	Ecuador	3,000
73	Rio Branco	Uruguay	2,633
74	Cordoba	Argentina	4,617
76	Amman	Jordan	2,900
78	La Paz	Bolivia	5,000
79	Artigas	Uruguay	23,200
80	Pretoria	South Africa	2,500^{17}
81	Ottawa	Canada	5,000
82	Warsaw	Poland	3,000
83	Mendoza	Argentina	780
84	Puerto Iguazu	Argentina	1,806
85	Seoul	South Korea	970
86	Santo Domingo	Dominican Republic	900
87	Doha	Qatar	1,000
88	Iquitos	Peru	350
89	Panama City	Panama	4,000
90	Singapore	Singapore	1,700
91	Moscow	Russia	1,006^{35}
92	Taipei	Taiwan	1,705
93	Chuy	Uruguay	1,200
94	Beijing	China	800^{30}
95	Helsinki	Finland	2,466
96	San Jose	Costa Rica	1,500
97	Budapest	Hungary	1,091
98	Hong Kong	Hong Kong	1,200
99	Havana	Cuba	179
100	Riyadh	Saudi Arabia	629^{16}
101	Prague	Czech Republic	1,500
102	Bissau	Guinea-Bissau	450
103	Lethem	Guyana	700
105	Kuala Lumpur	Malaysia	405^{27}
106	San Salvador	El Salvador	500
107	Jakarta	Indonesia	1,000
108	Guatemala City	Guatemala	500
109	Managua	Nicaragua	300
110	Muscat	Oman	250
111	Cairo	Egypt	2,500^{21}
112	Malabo	Equatorial Guinea	30
113	Cape Town	South Africa	1,200
114	Guayaramerín	Bolivia	3,000
115	Port-au-Prince	Haiti	90
116	Mumbai	India	300
117	Kuwait City	Kuwait	280
118	Istanbul	Turkey	834
119	Tegucigalpa	Honduras	350
120	Rivera	Uruguay	4,815
121	Bangkok	Thailand	310^{28}
122	Kingston	Jamaica	260
123	Brazzaville	Republic of the Congo	96^{25}
124	Rabat	Morocco	309
125	Accra	Ghana	240^{24}
126	Manila	Philippines	380^{31}
127	New Delhi	India	460^{32}
128	Zagreb	Croatia	269
129	Belgrade	Serbia	441^{13}
130	Abidjan	Ivory Coast	120
131	Windhoek	Namibia	146
132	Bratislava	Slovakia	400
133	Paso de Los Libres	Argentina	3,000
134	Ljubljana	Slovenia	346
135	Nicosia	Cyprus	230
136	Nassau	Bahamas	200
137	Nairobi	Kenya	400^{19}
138	Dili	Timor-Leste	130
139	Lagos	Nigeria	300
140	Ankara	Turkey	345
141	Tehran	Iran	129
142	Kinshasa	Democratic Republic of the Congo	120
143	Bucharest	Romania	434
144	Dakar	Senegal	250
145	Dar es Salam	Tanzania	81^{26}
146	Hanoi	Vietnam	307
147	Kyiv	Ukraine	434^{11}
148	Tunis	Tunisia	50
149	Yaounde	Cameroon	76^{20}
150	Sao Tome	São Tomé and Príncipe	131
151	Praia	Cape Verde	350
152	Tirana	Albania	100
153	Bridgetown	Barbados	29^{3}
154	Sofia	Bulgaria	150^{6}
155	Tallinn	Estonia	472
156	Ouagadougou	Burkina Faso	50
157	Astana	Kazakhstan	106^{29}
158	Islamabad	Pakistan	54^{33}
159	Belmopan	Belize	30
160	Baku	Azerbaijan	75
161	Algiers	Algeria	56
162	Libreville	Gabon	79
163	Tbilisi	Georgia	27
164	Katmandu	Nepal	60
165	Conakry	Guinea	30
166	Lilongwe	Malawi	70
167	Lome	Togo	18
168	Dhaka	Bangladesh	10
169	Addis Ababa	Ethiopia	65^{23}
170	Colombo	Sri Lanka	20^{34}
171	Sarajevo	Bosnia and Herzegovina	50
172	Yangoon	Myanmar	13
173	Lusaka	Zambia	30
174	Gaborone	Botswana	20
175	Cotonou	Benin	76^{18}
176	Bamako	Mali	30
177	Baghdad	Iraq	130
179	Castries	Saint Lucia	14
180	Minsk	Belarus	25
181	Yerevan	Armenia	60
182	Vatican City	Vatican City	10
183	Nouakchott	Mauritania	10
184	Puerto Quijarro	Bolivia	3,500
185	Port of Spain	Trinidad and Tobago	563^{2}
186	Manama	Bahrain	280
187	Damascus	Syria	2,600
188	Khartoum	Sudan	6
189	Harare	Zimbabwe	10
190	Pyongyang	North Korea	1
Total			4,404,255

^{1}Data from 2018 - In 2020, Brazil closed its embassy in Caracas during the Venezuelan presidential crisis. The embassy is reopening in 2023.

^{2}The Brazilian Embassy in Port of Spain is responsible for Brazilians in Trinidad and Tobago, Aruba and Curaçao. There are 250 Brazilians living in Aruba, 200 in Curaçao and 113 in Trinidad and Tobago.

^{3}The Brazilian Embassy in Bridgetown is responsible for Brazilians in multiple Caribbean nations, there are Brazilians living in Barbados, Antigua and Barbuda, Dominica, Grenada, Saint Kitts and Nevis and Saint Vincent and the Grenadines.

^{5}In the case of European Union countries, due to the Schengen Space, Brazilians registered in other consulates or those who hold dual citizenship might live in other countries. The Consulate of Brazil in Brussels is responsible for Brazilians in Luxembourg. There are 8.000 Brazilians living in Luxembourg.

^{6}The Embassy of Brazil in Sófia is also responsible for Brazilians in North Macedonia.

^{7}The Embassy of Brazil to Denmark is responsible for Brazilians in Lithuania.

^{8} The Consulate of Brazil in Barcelona is responsible for Brazilians in Andorra.

^{9} The Embassy of Brazil in Oslo is also responsible for Brazilians in Iceland. There are 287 Brazilians living in Iceland.

^{10}The Consulates of Brazil in Italy are responsible for Brazilians in Malta and San Marino.

^{11}The Embassy of Brazil to Ukraine is responsible for Brazilians in Moldova. There are 12 Brazilians living in Moldova.

^{12}The Embassy of Brazil to France is responsible for Brazilians in Monaco. There are 100 Brazilians living in Monaco.

^{13}The Embassy of Brazil to Serbia is responsible for Brazilians in Montenegro. There are 41 Brazilians living in Montenegro.

^{14}The Embassy of Brazil to Sweden is responsible for Brazilians in Latvia.

^{15}The Consulate of Brazil in Zurich is responsible for Brazilians in Liechtenstein.

^{16}The Embassy of Brazil to Saudi Arabia is responsible for Brazilians in Yemen.

^{17}The Embassy of Brazil in Pretoria is responsible for Brazilians in Lesotho and Mauritius.

^{18}The Embassy of Brazil to Benin is also responsible for Brazilians in Niger.

^{19}The Embassy of Brazil to Kenya is responsible for Brazilians in Burundi, Rwanda, Somalia and Uganda. There are 280 Brazilians living in Kenya, 15 in Burundi, 35 in Rwanda, 20 in Somalia and 50 in Uganda.

^{20}The Embassy of Brazil to Cameroon is responsible for Brazilians in Chad. There are 16 Brazilians living in Chad.

^{21}The Embassy of Brazil to Egypt is responsible for Brazilians in Eritrea.

^{22}The Embassy of Brazil to Mozambique is responsible for Brazilians in Eswatini and Madagascar. There are 9 Brazilians living in Eswatini and 20 in Madagascar.

^{23}The Embassy of Brazil to Ethiopia is responsible for Brazilians in Djibouti and South Sudan.

^{24}The Embassy of Brazil to Ghana is responsible for Brazilians in Liberia and Sierra Leone.

^{25}The Embassy of Brazil to Republic of Congo is responsible for Brazilians in Central African Republic.

^{26}The Embassy of Brazil to Tanzania is responsible for Brazilians in Seychelles and Comoros. There is 1 Brazilian living in Seychelles.

^{27}The Embassy of Brazil to Malasya is responsible for Brazilians in Brunei. There are 5 Brazilians living in Brunei.

^{28}The Embassy of Brazil to Thailand is responsible for Brazilians in Cambodia and Laos. There are 15 Brazilians living in Cambodia.

^{29}The Embassy of Brazil to Kazakhstan is responsible for Brazilians in Turkmenistan and Kyrgyzstan. There is 1 Brazilian living in Kyrgyzstan.

^{30}The Embassy of Brazil to China is responsible for Brazilians in Mongolia.

^{31}The Embassy of Brazil to Philippines is responsible for Brazilians in Marshall Islands, Palau, Federated States of Micronesia, Northern Mariana Islands and Guam. There are 3 Brazilians living in Guam and 1 living in the Federated States of Micronesia.

^{32}The Embassy of Brazil to India is responsible for Brazilians in Bhutan.

^{33}The Embassy of Brazil to Pakistan is responsible for Brazilians in Afghanistan and Tajikistan. There are 4 Brazilians living in Tajikistan.

^{34}The Embassy of Brazil to Sri Lanka is responsible for Brazilians in Maldives.

^{35}The Embassy of Brazil to Russia is responsible for Brazilians in Uzbekistan. There are 6 Brazilians living in Uzbekistan.

^{36}The Embassy of Brazil to Australia is responsible for Brazilians in Papua New Guinea, Vanuatu, Fiji, Nauru and Solomon Islands. There are 5 Brazilians living in Papua New Guinea, 10 in Vanuatu and 5 in Fiji.

^{37}The Consulate of Brazil in Sydney is responsible for Brazilians in French Polynesia, New Caledonia, Wallis and Futuna, Pitcairn Islands and American Samoa.

^{38}The Embassy of Brazil to New Zealand is responsible for Brazilians in Tokelau, Cook Islands, Niue, Kiribati, Tonga, Samoa and Tuvalu.
