= André Janones =

Brazilian politician

- Janones in 2022

Member of the Chamber of Deputies
- Incumbent
- Assumed office 1 February 2019
- Constituency: Minas Gerais

Personal details
- Born: André Luis Gaspar Janones; 5 May 1984 (age 42) Ituiutaba, Minas Gerais, Brazil
- Party: REDE (since 2026)
- Other political affiliations: PT (2003–2015); PSC (2015–2018); Avante (2018–2026)
- Profession: Lawyer

André Luis Gaspar Janones (born 5 May 1984) is a Brazilian lawyer, politician, and member of the Sustainability Network political party. Since 2019, he has been a federal deputy for Minas Gerais.

== Biography ==
Janones was born in Ituiutaba, on 5 May 1984. He is the son of Divina Gaspar Janones. His first job was as a bus conductor between 2003 and 2005. In 2004, he got a scholarship at the then Fundação Educacional de Ituiutaba, now a unit of the Minas Gerais State University. In 2005, he started working as a clerk at the Court of Justice of the State of Minas Gerais, in Ituiutaba. In 2008, he passed the Order of Attorneys of Brazil exam and set up his firm André Janones & Advogados Associados. He is a member of the Lagoinha Church.

== Political career ==
In 2016, Janones ran for mayor of Ituiutaba, finishing in second place with 13,759 votes (24.40% of valid votes). He gained notoriety when he proclaimed himself one of the main leaders of the truck drivers' strike in Brazil in 2018. As a result, he ended up being elected Federal Deputy in the 2018 Brazilian general election. He was the third most voted federal deputy in Minas Gerais, receiving 178,660 votes (1.77% of the valid votes in the election). He was highlighted during the Auxílio Emergencial votes, where his live on Facebook became the most commented on in the Western world, with 3.3 million views and 177 thousand comments, equaling the mark of the sertanejo singer Marília Mendonça.

On 29 January 2022, his pre-candidacy for the Presidency of the Republic, by his party, Avante, was made official. On 4 August 2022, during a live broadcast alongside former president and candidate Luiz Inácio Lula da Silva, Janones withdrew from the candidacy to support the PT. He declared, "From that moment on, our candidacy is unified and starts to be represented by the candidacy of President Lula." Janones was reelected as Federal Deputy for Minas Gerais, with 238,967 votes.

Janones was re-elected once again as Federal Deputy in the 2026 general elections with 78,780 votes. After his victory, he created a WhatsApp channel titled Exército do Lula (lit. 'Lula's Army') with the aim of mobilizing Lula da Silva supporters in his reelection campaign. On October 21, 2026, four days before the second round of the presidential elections, the channel surpassed 7.1 million followers.

According to the newspaper Metrópoles, Janones is the most significant political leader to have emerged from the last two presidential elections in Brazil, and Lula would not have secured his fourth term without his "decisive" role in the campaign. The day after Lula's victory, Janones was invited to help Pedro Sánchez in the Spanish elections.

== Health ==
Following the first debate for the 2026 presidential election, he was admitted to Vila Nova Star Hospital with a cardiac arrhythmia.
