= Liberato Caboclo =

Brazilian physician and politician (1938–2025)

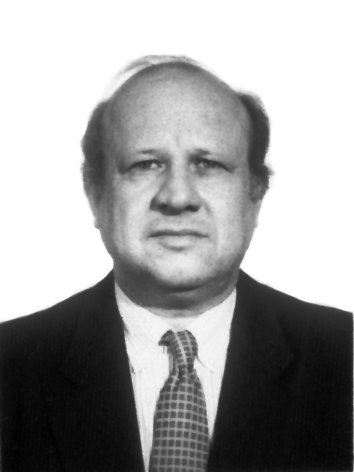
- Liberato Caboclo, in his capacity as Federal Deputy for São Paulo.

Mayor of São José do Rio Preto
- In office January 1, 1997 – December 31, 2000

Federal deputy from São Paulo
- In office February 1, 1991 – January 31, 1995

Personal details
- Born: José Liberato Ferreira Caboclo; March 14, 1938 Rio de Janeiro, Federal District, Brazil
- Died: June 14, 2025 (aged 87) São José do Rio Preto, São Paulo, Brazil
- Party: PDT (1990–1997, 1999–2025)
- Other political affiliations: PCB (before 1990), Independent (1997–1999)
- Children: 3
- Education: Federal University of Rio de Janeiro
- Profession: Physician; Writer; Politician

José Liberato Ferreira Caboclo (March 14, 1938 – June 14, 2025) was a Brazilian physician, writer and politician. A member of the Democratic Labor Party (PDT), he was a federal deputy for the state of São Paulo between 1990 and 1994 and served one term as mayor of São José do Rio Preto, from 1997 to 2000.

== Life and career ==
=== Early years and education ===
Born in the Piedade neighborhood of Rio de Janeiro in 1938, José is the son of a military man and a seamstress. After finishing high school, he enrolled in the medical program at the Federal University of Rio de Janeiro (UFRJ), after ranking second in the entrance exam.

In 1968, he completed his postgraduate studies at the Goiás State University (UEG). He earned his doctorate at the Karolinska Institute in Stockholm, Sweden.

=== Career ===
Caboclo moved to São José do Rio Preto, a city in the interior of the state of São Paulo, in 1971, to teach at the Faculty of Medicine of São José do Rio Preto (FAMERP). In faculty, he held various hospital management positions, in addition to serving as director on two occasions, from 1972 to 1980 and from 1981 to 1985.

== Politics ==
Caboclo began his political career as a member of the Brazilian Communist Party (PCB).

As a member of the Democratic Labor Party (PDT), he was elected federal deputy for the state of São Paulo in the 1990 election, after receiving 49,394 votes. He was the second most voted candidate in the party, behind only his fellow party member Beto Mansur. During his term, he eventually took over the leadership of the party in the Chamber of Deputies in Brasília. He voted in favor of the impeachment of Fernando Collor de Mello, and during the voting session he used the Congress podium to state that “there is no doubt that society has unanimously decided that the President is guilty and unable to continue exercising the function that the people entrusted to him.”

Also representing the PDT, he ran for mayor of São José do Rio Preto in 1996. He was elected to office after receiving 52,267 votes, beating João Gonçalves (PTB), marking the first time the party had won the city's municipal government. After a semester as mayor, he left the PDT, leaving him without a party. As mayor, he faced challenges in managing the municipality, dealing with a surge in dengue fever cases and clashes with the press and local politicians.

In 1999, he returned to the PDT—the party he remained with until the end of his life—but gave up on seeking reelection after disagreements with party president Leonel Brizola, whom he accused of plotting against his reelection bid.

== Death ==
Caboclo died at his home on June 14, 2025, at the age of 87, after suffering from kidney and heart problems. His body was laid in state at the São José do Rio Preto City Hall. He left behind three children.

== Selected bibliography ==
- Natal em descontos. São José do Rio Preto: Casa do Livro, 2000.
