= Youth Alliance =

Youth Alliance or Alliance Youth can refer to:

- Alliance Youth, a liberal political party youth wing in Northern Ireland
- Alliance Youth, a ministry of The Christian and Missionary Alliance
- Conference Youth Alliance, a youth association football competition in England
- European Free Alliance Youth, the youth wing of the European Free Alliance European political party
- European Youth Alliance, a short-lived alliance of fascist national youth organizations
- Football League Youth Alliance, a youth association football competition in England
- Liberal Alliance Youth, a liberal political party youth wing in Denmark
- National Youth Alliance, an American former right-wing political group
- Socialist Youth Alliance, a former leftist youth movement in Portugal
- Revolutionary Youth Alliance, a far-left political youth movement in Brazil
- Zimbabwe Youth in Alliance, a political party in Zimbabwe
