= Colina, São Paulo =

Municipality in the state of São Paulo in Brazil

Colina
- Municipality

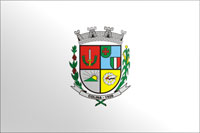
- Flag

- Location in São Paulo state

- Location in Brazil
- Coordinates: 20°42′49″S 48°32′28″W
- Country: Brazil
- Region: Southeast
- State: São Paulo

Government
  - Mayor: Dieb Taha (PSDB)

Area
  - Total: 422 km^{2} (163 sq mi)
- Elevation: 595 m (1,952 ft)

Population (2020)
  - Total: 18,535
  - Density: 43.9/km^{2} (114/sq mi)
- Time zone: UTC−3 (BRT)
- Website: www.colina.sp.gov.br

Colina is a municipality in the state of São Paulo in Brazil. The population is 18,535 (2020 est.) in an area of 422 km^{2} (163 sq mi). The elevation is 595 m. Colina is the Horse Capital of Brazil. It is also the large centre of a horse ranch, the Estação Experimental de Zootecnia. In July, there is a party called Festa do Cavalo. Many Lebanese immigrants live in Colina.

== Media ==
In telecommunications, the city was served by Companhia Telefônica Brasileira until 1973, when it began to be served by Telecomunicações de São Paulo. In July 1998, this company was acquired by Telefónica, which adopted the Vivo brand in 2012.

The company is currently an operator of cell phones, fixed lines, internet (fiber optics/4G) and television (satellite and cable).

== Born in Colina ==
- Augusto Cury, (1958) MD and writer.

== Religion ==
Christianity is present in the city as follows:

=== Catholic Church ===
The Catholic church in the municipality is part of the Roman Catholic Diocese of Barretos.

=== Protestant Church ===
The most diverse evangelical beliefs are present in the city, mainly Pentecostal, including the Assemblies of God in Brazil (the largest evangelical church in the country), Christian Congregation in Brazil, among others. These denominations are growing more and more throughout Brazil.

== See also ==
- List of municipalities in São Paulo
