= Rui Costa Pimenta =

Brazilian politician (born 1957)

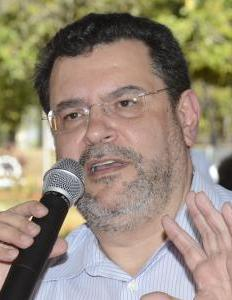
- Pimenta in 2014

National President of PCO
- Incumbent
- Assumed office 7 December 1995
- Preceded by: Created office

Personal details
- Born: Rui Costa Pimenta; 25 June 1957 (age 69) São Paulo, SP, Brazil
- Party: PCO (1995–present); PT (1980–1995)
- Spouse: Anaí Caproni (m. 1995)

Rui Costa Pimenta (born in São Paulo, 25 June 1957) is a Brazilian politician and a perennial presidential candidate aligned with the Trotskyist Workers' Cause Party (Portuguese: Partido da Causa Operária).

He was their candidate in the 2002, 2006, 2010, 2014 and 2026 presidential elections and placed last in all of the elections he ran.

== Early life and activism ==
Pimenta studied at Faculdade Cásper Líbero and started participating in student activism during this period, having been present at the National Union of Students' Refoundation Congress in 1980. He was also director of the Academic Center of Literary and Linguistic Studies (CAELL) of the Faculty of Letters at the University of São Paulo

Also in 1980, he was part of the Fourth International Organization's Foundation Congress. This congress saw the birth of the Workers' Cause coalition in the Workers' Party. In 1985, during his participation in the labor movement in protest against then President Sarney, he was elected as the director of the Central Única dos Trabalhadores, Brazil's largest trade union center, in the Greater São Paulo region.

In 1992, the members of the Workers' Cause coalition officially declared their intentions to split from the Workers' Party. In 1996, the Workers' Cause Party was registered.

In March of 2024, Pimenta met with Ismail Haniyeh, leader of Hamas.

== Political positions ==
Pimenta is a marxist and trotskyist. He opposes imperialism, neoliberalism, identity politics, and restrictions on free speech and gun ownership.

He supported Luís Inácio Lula da Silva in the 2018 and 2022 Brazilian general elections.

=== Gender issues ===
Rui Costa expressed his opposition to the Brazilian Congressional Bill No. 896, justifying his position by stating his opposition to expanding the repressive powers of the Brazilian State, even though the proposal is justified as a fight against the far-right.

Rui expressed opposition to gender studies and gender identities — a concept he characterized as "gender ideology." The politician argued that the distinction between gender and biological sex is an abstract construct lacking a concrete basis for social organization. Additionally, he opposed the use of women's restrooms by trans women, advocating instead for the implementation of individual or unisex facilities.

Party political offices
New political party	National President of Workers' Cause Party; 1995–present	Incumbent
New political party	Workers' Cause Party nominee for President of Brazil; 2002, 2006, 2010, 2014	Most recent
