= Workers' Cause Party =

Workers' Cause Party Partido da Causa Operária
- President: Rui Costa Pimenta
- Founded: 7 December 1995; 30 years ago
- Registered: 30 September 1997; 29 years ago
- Split from: Workers' Party
- Newspaper: Workers' Cause News
- Youth wing: Revolutionary Youth Alliance
- Women's wing: Rosa Luxemburg Women's Collective
- Cultural wing: Groups for a Revolutionary and Independent Art
- Black wing: João Candido Black Collective
- Membership: 7 020
- Ideology: Communism; Marxism; Trotskyism; Socialist patriotism; Left conservatism
- Political position: Left-wing to far-left
- Colours: Dark Red; Yellow

Party flag

Website
- www.pco.org.br

Workers' Cause Party (WCP, Portuguese: Partido da Causa Operária, PCO) is a political party in Brazil. Its origins can be traced back to 1978, when several Trotskyist activists who were not satisfied with the socialist international united under the name Tendência Trotskista do Brasil (Brazilian Trotskyist Tendency, TTB). However, the registered party was only established in 1995. Its electoral number is 29.

== History ==
In 1980, this organization united itself with the newly formed Workers' Party (PT), becoming very involved in that decade's municipal and state elections, with several mayors and state representatives elected.

In 1990 and 1991, however, several TTB members were expelled from the PT due to their non-commitment to the Party's statutes. After that, the PCO was officially organized and founded in 1995.

In 2006, the candidacy of Rui Costa Pimenta to presidency was abrogated by the Superior Electoral Court.

In 2018, PCO supported the bid of Luiz Inácio Lula da Silva (PT), Fernando Haddad (PT) and Manuela D'Ávilla (PCdoB) informally and critically, refusing the invitation to compose the coalition (PT, PCdoB and PROS) officially.

In 2020, PCO suffered a cyber attack resulting in the loss of more than 4,000 articles on its website.

In August 2021, PCO expressed support to the Taliban about their "victory over American imperialism", considering it "a victory for all oppressed people". The party has also praised Osama bin Laden, the leader of Al-Qaeda, describing him as "an example of selflessness, conviction, disposition" in the struggle for "the freedom of his people". the PCO however follows the traditional Trotskyist position of being against individual terrorism as its method of political struggle. The PCO also argues that the Taliban ideology and practices are "an expression of the profound social backwardness of that people", it sees the need to support any movement of national liberation against US-lead imperialism.

In 2022, the PCO supported the candidacy of Luiz Inácio Lula da Silva in the 2022 Brazilian general election, it however choose not to participate in the formal coalition or in any of the campaign committees because of divergences and repeated criticism of the program of the coalition.

== Youth wing ==
The youth wing of the party is the Revolutionary Youth Alliance (AJR), which publishes the magazine Revista Juventude Revolucionária.

== Ideology ==
The PCO supports implementation of socialism, following the Trotskyist branch, which they regard as the true form of Marxism. According to them, the Marxist movement was corrupted by Stalinism and later by social movements such as bourgeois feminism and the LGBT movement, which they term as "identitarian". The party rejects woke culture, arguing that it is "not progressive at all" and constitutes "an attempt to transform chaos into an instrument of political struggle". Because of this, the party is considered left conservative.

The party opposes gun control policies, saying that "The bourgeoisie is armed. It has the army, the police and all other organs of repression, public or private. The people have nothing. It is defenseless in the face of the war machine of his enemies who control the State". However, the PCO also considers the police as an oppressive force and favors the formation of a "popular police".

While opposing the PT due to that party's controversial alliances in the political and business sectors, the PCO interprets the PT's government as a necessary step in the current Brazilian political context, in order to strengthen workers' organizations. The party also sees the impeachment of Dilma Rousseff of 2016 as a coup d'état and were also against Lula's prison sentence in 2018, protesting for his liberty afterwards.

During the COVID-19 pandemic, the PCO supported vaccination efforts while opposing mandatory vaccination.

The PCO is a staunch supporter of unrestricted free speech, asserting that the people should always be entitled to express their views and opinions, no matter how controversial, offensive or misleading they might be, and that any attempt of censorship will eventually result in the bourgeoisie controlling the public opinion. The party is unique in the Brazilian left in its opposition to anti-fake news legislation and the criminalizing of homophobia. The party also denounced criminalization transphobic speech as attack on freedom of religion, stating: "A citizen can no longer profess their religion if they believe that "transsexuals" and homosexuals are, in their view, an anomaly and contrary to God's law. The overwhelming majority of religions—if not all—share this understanding."

The party defends a progressive function of religion, stating: "Marxists, who aren't religious, never said we should force people to abandon their religion. That's absurd! Why would someone do that? They believe in God, they've had their little church since childhood, they were born there... If you're active in the labor movement, you'll never go to workers and raise issues with their religion." It also defended Islam, stating: "Islam is not a repressive religion. Generally speaking, it is even more progressive than Christianity. Christianity is the religion of imperialist countries. Islam is the religion of countries oppressed by imperialism."

Despite being considered a far-left party, it has also been described as having an agenda close to Bolsonarism.

The PCO supports Palestine in the Gaza war, Venezuela in the Essequibo dispute and Russia in the Russo-Ukrainian War.

== Election results ==
=== Presidential elections ===
Election	Candidate	Running mate	Colligation	First round		Second round		Result
Election	Candidate	Running mate	Colligation	Votes	%	Votes	%	Result
1998	None	None	None	–	–	–	–	–
2002	Rui Costa Pimenta (PCO)	Pedro Paulo de Abreu Pinheiro (PCO)	None	38,619	0,05% (#6)	–	–	Lost ✗
2006	Rui Costa Pimenta (PCO)	Pedro Paulo de Abreu Pinheiro (PCO)	None	0	0% (#8)	–	–	Lost ✗
2010	Rui Costa Pimenta (PCO)	Edson Dorta (PCO)	None	12,206	0.01% (#9)	–	–	Lost ✗
2014	Rui Costa Pimenta (PCO)	Ricardo Machado (PCO)	None	12,324	0.01% (#11)	–	–	Lost ✗
2018	None*	None	None	–	–	–	–	–
2022	None*	None	None	–	–	–	–	–
2026	Rui Costa Pimenta (PCO)	Antônio Carlos Silva (PCO)	None	14,992	0.01% (#12)	–	–	Lost ✗
Source: Election Resources: Federal Elections in Brazil – Results Lookup*

=== Legislative elections ===
Election	Chamber of Deputies				Federal Senate				Role in government
Election	Votes	%	Seats	+/–	Votes	%	Seats	+/–	Role in government
1998	8,067	0.01%	0 / 513	New	274	0.00%	0 / 81	New	Extra-parliamentary
2002	29,351	0.03%	0 / 513	0	194,112	0.13%	0 / 81	0	Extra-parliamentary
2006	29,083	0.03%	0 / 513	0	27,476	0.03%	0 / 81	0	Extra-parliamentary
2010	6,660	0.01%	0 / 513	0	21,263	0.01%	0 / 81	0	Extra-parliamentary
2014	12,969	0.01%	0 / 513	0	8,561	0.01%	0 / 81	0	Extra-parliamentary
2018	2,785	0.00%	0 / 513	0	38,691	0.02%	0 / 81	0	Extra-parliamentary
2022	8,660	0.01%	0 / 513	0	26,614	0.03%	0 / 81	0	Extra-parliamentary
2026	3,041	0.00%	0 / 513	0	50,478	0.02%	0 / 81	0	Extra-parliamentary

== Newspapers and magazines ==
- Jornal da Causa Operária (JCO) – Physical newspaper
- Diário da Causa Operária (DCO) – Current virtual newspaper
- Causa Operária TV – Official YouTube channel
- Rádio Causa Operária – Official radio station
- Revista Juventude Revolucionária – Revolutionary Youth Alliance magazine

== Controversies and criticism ==
The PCO is accused by various media outlets, rival leftist parties (such as PT and PSOL) and former members of being a cult and having cult-like behavior, due to the fact that party members seriously defend the ideas of their party, its founder Rui Costa Pimenta and his family (their ideas are considered by detractors as reactionary and very close to a personality cult, in this case a personality cult around the Costa Pimenta family, the founding family of the PCO).

=== Accusations of disrespect for human rights ===
Because they support the Taliban, the PCO and its supporters are accused by some progressive movements (mainly women's rights movements and LGBT movements) of disrespecting human rights, as they claim that PCO defends a hostile regime to women and other minorities (such as LGBTQ people and non-Muslims) and who make light of the fatal victims who had their rights disrespected by the Taliban.

=== Attacks on other left-wing activists ===
Despite being a leftist party, the PCO is notorious for its attacks against feminists, indigenous rights activists, landless movement, students and members of other left-wing parties, who accuse the PCO of truculence and of having a position similar to fascism.

=== Accusations of authoritarianism and nepotism ===
One of the reasons why the PCO is considered a cult (according to former members of the party) is due to the fact that the founder and leader of the party, Rui Costa Pimenta controls the PCO in an authoritarian way, with an iron fist (so that only his ideas and his wishes are respected), in addition to punishing detractors who are against his ideas (mostly with physical abuse) and handing over important (high-ranking) positions within the party to three of his children, Natália Pimenta, João Jorge Caproni Costa Pimenta and Carlos Henrique Caproni Pimenta. As a result, former members of the party accuse Costa Pimenta of practicing nepotism, since his three children got positions in the party not on their own merits, but because they were his sons (the youngest of his three children, Carlos Henrique Caproni Pimenta, was appointed to an important position within the party when he was still a teenager).

Preceded by 28 – BLRP (PRTB)	Numbers of Brazilian Official Political Parties; 29 – WCP (PCO)	Succeeded by 30 – NEW (NOVO)
