= Lula's Army =

WhatsApp channel

Lula's Army (Portuguese: Exército do Lula) is a WhatsApp channel created during Brazil's 2026 general elections by Federal Deputy for Minas Gerais André Janones, with the aim of mobilizing supporters of Luiz Inácio Lula da Silva, who was then a candidate for reelection.

Employing military terminology—its members being designated "soldiers" and assigned daily "missions," which included sharing videos, boosting publications, and amplifying content favorable to Lula on social media, as well as establishing ambitious targets—the channel experienced exponential growth in its follower base: within a mere nine days, the number rose from 3.7 million to 7 million followers. The channel became the subject of various proceedings before the Superior Electoral Court, which afforded it media visibility. The channel is regarded as responsible for Lula da Silva's victory in the second round of the 2026 elections.

== History ==
=== Background ===
André Janones is a Brazilian politician, elected Federal Deputy for Minas Gerais in 2018 and 2022. Although he has not been affiliated with the Workers' Party (PT) since 2012, in the 2022 elections he acted as one of the leading figures in Lula's campaign. Janones became known for "rivalling" the right and Bolsonarism on social media, managing to garner digital support for the PT campaign, which emerged victorious in that election.

After joining the governing base in Congress during Lula's third administration, Janones left Avante and joined Rede Sustentabilidade in order to run for reelection. In the meantime, André continued his mobilization work in favor of Lula. Even before the pre-campaign period, press outlets were already reporting the president's staff's concern regarding social media, whose right-leaning mobilization could be an obstacle to the reelection of the PT candidate.

=== Creation of the channel ===
On April 15, 2026, a WhatsApp channel named Exército do Lula was created. Initially, the initiative did not attract much attention, and even some factions allied with Lula considered the campaign method employed by Janones too "aggressive" toward the public. In an interview given to SBT News and released on May 3, 2026, Janones stated that that year's election "will require a strong narrative dispute, especially on social media." The deputy said that "the progressive camp needs to intensify communication to face competitive adversaries such as Flávio Bolsonaro." In a lecture in June 2026 where he taught tactics to activists, Janones declared that "social media is the street of today, and we have to confront them, yes. It's about taking the president's achievements, taking what he has done, and going after the 'cattle' [right-wing supporters], giving them a beating, confronting them."

At a Workers' Party event in June 2026, Janones stated that supporters "should avoid responding directly to accusations and false news," since "a direct reaction expands the reach of the adversary's message." He asserted that, in such cases, "the best strategy is to 'shift the focus' and present another narrative." He argued that "activists should produce their own content, rather than merely reposting official videos of Lula," because "the algorithm tends to reduce the delivery of repeated material and that each supporter's personal testimony carries more weight with their followers."

=== Second-round campaign ===
Lula and Janones celebrating the victory

On October 4, 2026, the date of the first round, Janones—despite losing 160,000 votes compared to 2022—was reelected as a federal deputy. From that point on, he directed his efforts entirely toward the presidential campaign. After the first round, the channel's follower count increased from 50,000 to 1 million in two days, which brought it media visibility. On October 17, Janones called on Lula's supporters to wear the Brazilian national team jersey—politically associated with Bolsonarism—as a "mission to reclaim the national symbols." This demonstration garnered the support of celebrities and of Lula himself. On October 19, Janones was hospitalized with cardiac arrhythmia following Band's presidential debate, which led to a 19-hour hiatus without posts. André Janones attributed the incident to sleeping "two to three hours a day" in order to manage the channel. Janones left the hospital where he had been admitted wearing a Brazilian national team jersey.

On October 22, the channel once again drew media attention by encouraging Google searches regarding former deputy Talvane Albuquerque and the surname "Bolsonaro," recalling events related to the 1998 assassination of Federal Deputy for Alagoas Ceci Cunha. Two days later, the channel reached 10 million participants, becoming one of the largest politically focused WhatsApp channels in Brazil and the second most followed in the country.

== Proceedings at the Superior Electoral Court ==
Lula's Army unavailable on 13 October

The channel was the target of actions before the Superior Electoral Court by Flávio Bolsonaro's campaign on allegations such as the dissemination of fake news. The channel was temporarily suspended on October 11, when it had 4 million participants. The decision by Kássio Nunes Marques was subsequently overturned by the court's Inspectorate following review. The channel was then restored. Leaders of the Workers' Party characterized the measure against the channel as "censorship."

On October 21, a potential new measure to restrict WhatsApp channels in the 48-hour period before the election was announced. The change drew the attention of jurists because it affected the "Exército do Lula" channel, prompting the drafting of a letter to prevent "restriction of political freedom." On October 22, the court reinforced its surveillance of the channel, requesting that Meta conduct a thorough scrutiny of the channel over the course of 24 hours.

== Legacy ==
According to the newspaper Metrópoles, Janones is the most significant political leader to have emerged from the last two presidential elections in Brazil, and Lula would not have secured his fourth term without him given his decisive role in the campaign. The day after Lula's victory, Janones was invited to help Pedro Sánchez in the Spanish elections.
