= The Dreamseller =

Novel series by Augusto Cury

The Dreamseller: The Calling
- First edition (Portuguese)
- Author: Augusto Cury
- Language: English
- Genre: Novel
- Publisher: Simon & Schuster (USA)
- Publication date: 8 February 2011
- Publication place: Brazil
- Media type: Print (Hardcover)
- Pages: 256
- ISBN: 1-4391-9572-2

The Dreamseller saga consists of three novels written by Augusto Cury – doctor, psychiatrist, psychotherapist and publishing phenomenon in Brazil. The first book to be released in the U.S. market — The Dreamseller: The Calling — features characters that are present in the whole saga. Cury draws a parallel between the effects of modern society in our lives and our emotions.

== The books ==
The Dreamseller - The Calling

A stranger tries to save a despairing man from suicide. Nobody knows where the enigmatic stranger comes from, his name or history. He rants that modern societies have turned themselves into a global hospice. He begins to engage followers in order to sell dreams. While charming people and releasing them from the bondage of routine, he also makes many enemies. Is he an authority or just an insane unknown?

The Dreamseller - The Anonymous Revolution

The Dreamseller, the Master, continues to turn society upside down. After suffering irreversible losses and watching his world collapse, this mysterious man strives to rebuild his own life by selling dreams. The Dreamseller and the Anonymous Revolution shows how each human being's path is complex, written with tears and joy; tranquility and anxiety; sanity and madness.

The Dreamseller - Sower of Ideas

In the third book of the saga The Dreamseller, the Master, an internationally powerful man finds out that living in the moment is fun but that success is cyclical, just like tender leaves that sprout gloriously in the spring but invariably fall to the ground by next winter. He goes through distant and inhospitable places, fights enormous battles and, after many fatigues, finds out that everything he seeks is closer than he imagined.

== The Dreamseller around the world ==
Augusto Cury's books can be found in more than 50 countries worldwide. The Dreamseller novels have been selling massively in Latin America and Portugal. The Dreamseller was nominated for this year's best international fiction book in China. In Spain, Augusto Cury is in the top ten best sellers. In Portugal, his readers organized study groups to discuss his theories and published their conclusions on multiple websites.
