= Revolutionary Youth Alliance =

Revolutionary Youth Alliance (Portuguese: Aliança da Juventude Revolucionária - AJR) is a Trotskyist political youth movement in Brazil, being a faction of the Workers' Cause Party (PCO). AJR publishes Juventude Revolucionária and works within the National Students Union (UNE). AJR also takes part in student council elections.
