= Augusto Cury =

Brazilian writer and psychiatrist

- Cury in 2026

Personal details
- Born: Augusto Jorge Cury; October 2, 1958 (age 68) Colina, São Paulo, Brazil
- Party: Avante (2026–present)
- Other political affiliations: Green Party (2009–2010)
- Occupation: Physician, psychiatrist, writer, politician

Augusto Jorge Cury (born 2 October 1958) is a Brazilian physician, psychiatrist, author, professor, and politician. He first rose to prominence through his extensive body of literary work, which encompasses books on personal development, education, human relations, and emotional health, in addition to novels. Although the press and the publishing industry routinely classify his books as self-help literature, Cury rejects this label, preferring instead to describe his work as a platform for disseminating his ideas about how the human mind functions.

In 2026, Augusto Cury joined the Avante party and officially launched his presidential candidacy for that year's elections, with former Federal Deputy for Minas Gerais Júlio Delgado as his running mate.

== Biography and career ==
Augusto Jorge Cury was born in Colina, in the state of São Paulo, on October 2, 1958, the son of farmer and lawyer Salomão Jorge Cury, a former city councilman in Colina, and Ana Regina Brait Cury. In a profile published by Trip magazine in 2010, Cury recounted that he grew up in a family of relatively modest means, with five siblings; his father worked as a lawyer, while his mother was a homemaker. The same profile described academic difficulties he faced during part of his childhood and adolescence.

He enrolled in the medical program at the Faculty of Medicine of São José do Rio Preto. In interviews, he has stated that he faced a period of psychological distress during his undergraduate studies—an experience he later connected to his interest in examining emotions and thought patterns. He graduated in Medicine in 1984 and subsequently practiced psychiatry and psychotherapy. In an interview published by the Regional Council of Medicine of the State of São Paulo in 2018, he stated that he had not regularly engaged in clinical practice for approximately a decade, dedicating himself instead primarily to literary production, lectures, and educational projects.

Over decades of psychiatric practice, Cury developed his Multifocal Intelligence framework, eventually making his literary debut in the late 1990s with Multifocal Intelligence after facing numerous editorial rejections. His commercial success escalated steadily: from 11 million copies in 2010 to 27 million in Brazil alone by 2016, and surpassing 30 million by 2017, when Forbes named him the country's top-selling author of the century, with over 50 books published in more than 70 countries. His works have been issued by Planeta (which incorporated the Academia imprint for his titles in 2006), Sextante, and HarperCollins. When Paulo Coelho publicly challenged him to verify his sales figures, Cury declined, remarking that competing for rankings reflects a society unduly fixated on fame.

=== Multifocal Intelligence Theory ===
Cury's Multifocal Intelligence Theory proposes that thought results not only from conscious will, but also from automatic mechanisms of memory and emotion, with the self exercising a normative function to manage these processes—a function which, in his practical books, takes the form of the D.C.D. technique ("Doubt, Criticize, and Determine"). Although his works enjoy vast circulation, the theory lacks established scientific recognition; in 2026, psychiatrists interviewed by Folha de S.Paulo stated they were unaware of any validation for the model and did not employ it in clinical practice. Cury rebutted the criticisms, arguing that his concepts have been applied in educational contexts and that his theory's development outside traditional psychiatric currents does not justify its dismissal, though critics point to the absence of publications in peer-reviewed journals and replicable methodology.

== Political career ==
Prior to running for office, Cury had a brief affiliation with the Green Party, which he joined in 2009—the same period in which Marina Silva also entered the party. According to a profile published by Trip, his name was considered for candidacies to the Senate or state governorship, though he ultimately did not run in the 2010 elections; during that time, he collaborated on discussions related to education within Marina Silva's pre‑campaign. For the 2026 elections, he became a member of the Avante party, which announced his presidential candidacy in April of that year. His candidacy was officially formalized on August 3 at a convention held at the Legislative Assembly of São Paulo. Two days later, Cury announced former Federal Deputy Júlio Delgado of Minas Gerais, also affiliated with Avante, as his running mate.

== Bibliography ==
(Some of the titles here were translated literally and aren't necessarily with their titles of their English versions)

- Inteligência Multifocal (Multifocal Intelligence) - April 16, 1999
- A Pior Prisão do Mundo (The Worst Prison in the World) - 2000
- Escola da Vida: Harry Potter no Mundo Real (School of Life: Harry Potter in The Real World) - January 1, 2002
- Você é Insubstituível (You Are Irreplaceable) - April 22, 2002
- Revolucione Sua Qualidade de Vida (Revolutionize Your Quality of Life) - November 8, 2002
- Dez Leis para Ser Feliz (Ten Rules to be Happy) - February 2003
- Pais Brilhantes, Professores Fascinantes (Brilliant Parents, Fascinating Teachers) - September 2003
- Seja Líder de Si Mesmo (Be Your Own Leader) - October 2004
- Nunca Desista de Seus Sonhos (Never Give Up on Your Dreams) - December 2004
- A Ditadura da Beleza e a Revolução das Mulheres (The Dictatorship of Beauty and The Revolution of Women) - February 2005
- O Futuro da Humanidade (The Future of Humanity) - March 2005
- Collection Análise da Inteligência de Cristo (Analysis of Christ's Intelligence) - March 2006
  - O Mestre dos Mestres (The Master of Masters) vol. 1
  - O Mestre da Sensibilidade (The Master of Sensibility) vol. 2
  - O Mestre da Vida (The Master of Life) vol. 3
  - O Mestre do Amor (The Master of Love) vol. 4
  - O Mestre Inesquecível (The Unforgettable Master) vol. 5
- Superando o Cárcere da Emoção (Overcoming The Prison of Emotion) - December 2006
- Doze Semanas para Mudar uma Vida (Twelve Weeks to Change Your Life) - January 2007
- Os Segredos do Pai-Nosso (The Secrets of the Lord's Prayer) - February 2007
- Maria, a maior educadora da História (Mary, The Greatest Educator of History) - May 2007
- A Sabedoria Nossa de Cada Dia: Os Segredos do Pai-Nosso 2 (Our Daily Wisdom: The Secrets of the Lord's Prayer 2) - May 2007
- Filhos Brilhantes, Alunos Fascinantes (Brilliant Children, Fascinating Students) - September 2007
- Treinando a emoção para ser feliz (Training your Emotions to Be Happy) - December 2007
- O Código da Inteligência (The Code of Intelligence) - May 2008
- The Dreamseller Saga:
  - O Vendedor de Sonhos: O Chamado (The Dreamseller: The Calling) - December 2008
  - O Vendedor de Sonhos e a Revolução dos Anônimos (The Dreamseller: The Anonymous Revolution) - January 2009
  - O vendedor de Sonhos: O Semeador de Ideias (The Dreamseller: Sower of Ideas) - 2009
- De Gênio e Louco todo Mundo tem um Pouco (Every Man Has a Genius in His Sleeve) - November 2009
- O Código Da Inteligência. Guia De Estudo (The Code of Intelligence - Study Guide) - January 2009
- Mentes Brilhantes, Mentes Treinadas (Brilliant Minds, Trained Minds) - July 2010
- A fascinante construção do Eu (The Fascinating Construction of Me) - November 2010
- O Código da Inteligência E A Excelência Emocional (The Code of Intelligence and Emotional Excellence) - January 2011
- Mulheres Inteligentes, Relações Saudáveis (Intelligent Women, Healthy Relationships) - 2011
- O Colecionador de Lágrimas - Holocausto Nunca Mais (The Collector of Tears: Holocaust No More) - 2012
- Manual para jovens estressados, mas muito inteligentes! (Manual for Stressed, But Very Smart, Young People!) - 2012
- Armadilhas da mente (Traps of the Mind) - September 2013
- Em busca do sentido da vida (Looking for the Meaning of Life) - October 2013
- Ansiedade: Como Encarar o Mal do Século (Anxiety: How to Face The Evil of The Century) - December 2013
- Proteja sua emoção - Aprenda a ter a mente livre e saudável (Protect Your Happiness - Learn How to have a Free and Healthy Mind) - 2014
- Controle o estresse - Saiba como encontrar equilíbrio (Control Your Stress - Know How to Have Balance) - 2014
- Vá mais longe - Treine sua memória e sua inteligência (Go Beyond - Train Your Memory And Your Intelligence) - 2014
- Sonhos e disciplina - Transforme seus projetos em realidade (Dreams and Discipline - Turn Your Projects into Reality) - 2014
- Pais Inteligentes formam sucessores, não herdeiros (Intelligent Parents Form Successors, Not Heirs) - April 2014
- Bíblia King James Atualizada Freemind (King James Bible Freemind Modernized) - June 2014
- Felicidade roubada (Stolen Happiness) - 2014
- As Regras de Ouro dos Casais Saudáveis (The Golden Rules of Healthy Couples) - 2014
- Petrus Logus - O Guardião do Tempo (Petrus Logus - The Guardian of Time) - October 2014
- Superação - Seja forte e resiliente e vença as dificuldades (Overcoming - Be Strong And Resilient And Fix Your Problems) - 2015
- Autocontrole - Vença os fantasmas da emoção (Self Control - Overcome Ghosts of Emotion) - 2015
- Lidere sua mente - Seja autor(a) da própria história (Lead Your Mind - Be The Author of Your Own Story) - 2015
- Pais e filhos - Sem diálogo, as famílias morrem (Parents and Children - Without Dialogue, Families Die) - 2015
- Bons Profissionais e Excelentes Profissionais (Good Professionals and Excellent Professionals) - April de 2015
- Como Administrar Seu Intelecto (How to Administer Your Intellect) - April de 2015
- As Quatro Armadilhas da Mente e a Inteligência Multifocal (The Four Traps of The Mind and Multifocal intelligence) - April de 2015
- Antiestresse Para Todos - Controlando A Ansiedade, Colorindo A Vida (Anti-Stress For Everyone - Controlling Anxiety, Coloring Life) - 2015
- Gestão da Emoção (Emotional Regulation) - 2015
- Do Zero ao Gênio (From Zero to Genius) - December 2015
- O Médico da Humanidade e A Cura da Corrupção (The Doctor of Humanity and the Cure for Corruption) - 2015
- Ansiedade - Como Enfrentar o Mal do Século Para Filhos e Alunos (Anxiety - How to Face The Evil of the Century, For Children and Students) - 2015
- Ansiedade 2 - Autocontrole - Como Controlar o Estresse e Manter o Equilíbrio (Anxienty 2 - Self control - How to Control Stress and Maintain Balance) - 2016
- O Funcionamento da Mente (The Functioning of the Mind) - 2016
- Ciúmes - O medo da perda acelera a perda (Jealousy - Fear of Loss Accelerates The Loss) - 2016
- Petrus Logus - Os Inimigos da Humanidade (Petrus Logus - Humanity's Enemies) - August 2016
- O homem mais inteligente da história (The Most Intelligent Man in History) - (latest) 2016
