= Arrest of Jair Bolsonaro =

2025 house arrest of President of Brazil

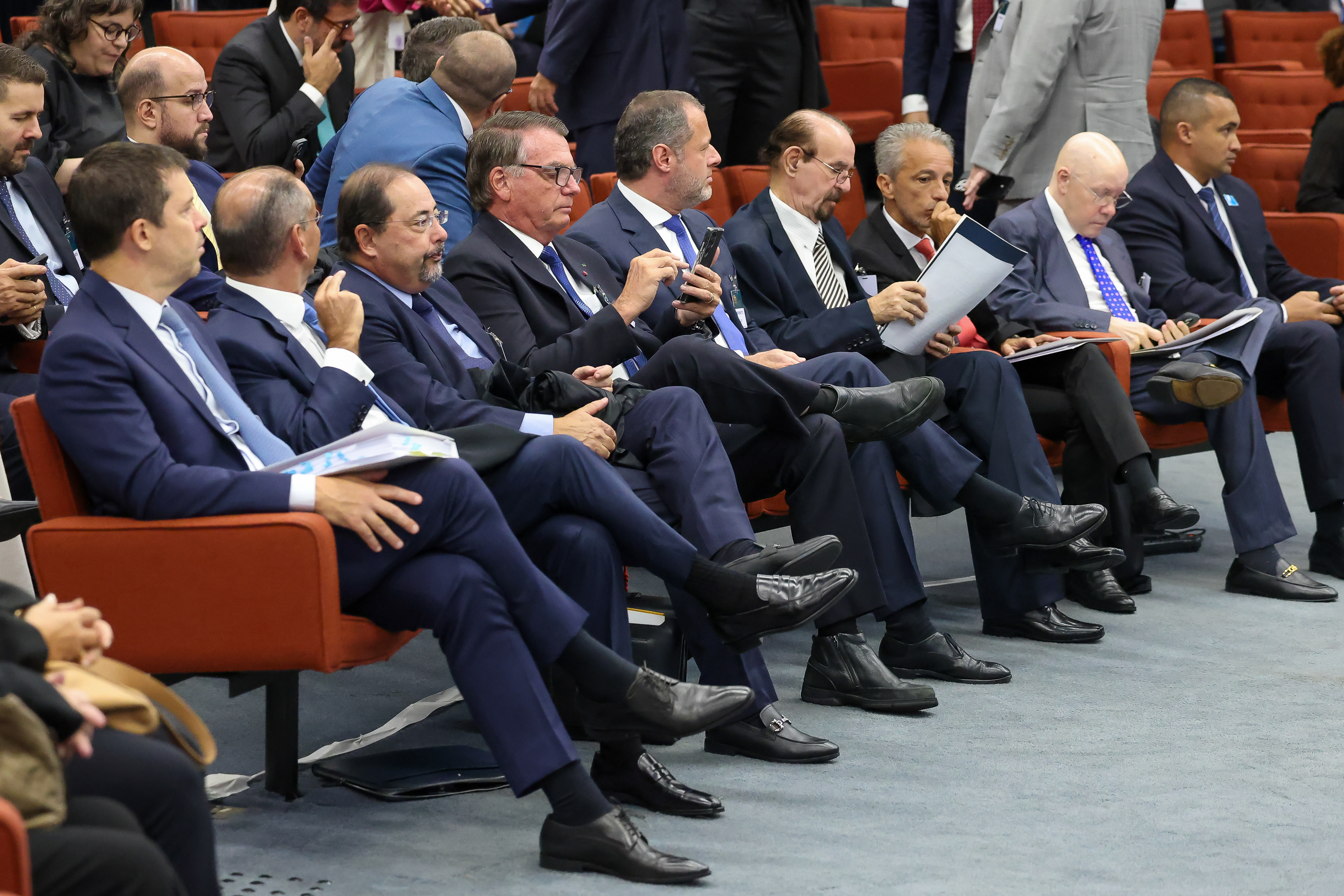
Former Brazilian President Jair Bolsonaro (seated fourth from left), along with others investigated for the attempted coup d'état in Brazil in 2022–2023, during the start of the trial in the Supreme Federal Court regarding the case in March 2025. In that trial, Bolsonaro and the others were found guilty of attempting a coup.

Former president of Brazil Jair Bolsonaro was placed under house arrest, under precautionary measures in August 2025, in the context of his involvement in an attempted coup d'état between 2022 and 2023.

Bolsonaro was also arrested for unrelated reasons in 1986 while in the army after writing an article criticizing low military salaries.

== Context ==
Bolsonaro became a defendant in Ação Penal 2668 (lit. 'Criminal Action 2668'), which investigated an attempted coup d'état during and after the 2022 Brazilian general election, including plans to assassinate then president-elect Luiz Inácio Lula da Silva, vice-president-elect Geraldo Alckmin and Supreme Court Justice Alexandre de Moraes.

=== Conspiracy with Donald Trump ===
In early 2025, according to a survey by the Federal Police (PF), the former president and his son, federal deputy Eduardo Bolsonaro, visited US authorities with the aim of obtaining the imposition of assessments against Brazilian public officials, due to alleged oversight under AP 2 668. According to the PF, both acted “maliciously and deliberately in an unlawful manner” and “with the aim of attempting to subject the functioning of the Federal Supreme Court [STF] to the scrutiny of another foreign state, through hostile acts of spurious and criminal negotiations with clear interference in the justice system and specifically to coerce that Court.”

On April 2, the United States announced 10% tariffs on Brazilian imports, effective April 5, under the justification of protecting domestic industry. On July 9, 2025, Trump announced 50% tariffs on all Brazilian products, effective August 1, citing Brazil's treatment of Bolsonaro as a “witch hunt” and alleging trade deficits, even though the US had a trade surplus of US$7.4 billion with Brazil in 2024.

Bolsonaro had already been imprisoned for 15 days in 1986 when he was in the army as a disciplinary measure after writing an article criticizing the low salaries of military personnel.

=== Electronic ankle bracelet ===
On July 18, 2025, Minister Alexandre de Moraes of the Federal Supreme Court (STF) imposed precautionary measures on Bolsonaro, including the use of an electronic ankle bracelet; house arrest at night and on weekends; authority to access embassies and consulates and to maintain contact with ambassadors and foreign authorities; and authorization to use social media, directly or indirectly, including through third parties, in a decision endorsed by the First Panel of the STF, after a request by the Federal Police (PF) and with the approval of the Attorney General's Office (PGR). The defense appealed, but Moraes upheld the measures on July 24 because the former president made a speech broadcast on digital platforms and posted on various profiles.

Moraes clarified that Bolsonaro is not prohibited from giving interviews or making public or private speeches, but that he should not “exploit these interviews or speeches for subsequent dissemination on social media, especially through the actions of ‘digital militias’ and political supporters previously coordinated for this purpose.”

Moraes ordered Bolsonaro to be placed under house arrest on August 4, 2025, because the former president continued to use social media to post messages, not his own, but those of his allies, including his three sons. “The flagrant disregard for the precautionary measures was so obvious that, again, the defendant's own son, Senator Flávio Nantes Bolsonaro, decided to remove the post made on his profile on the social media platform Instagram in order to conceal the legal violation,” Moraes explained in the decision.

In addition to prohibiting Bolsonaro from leaving his home, Moraes banned visitors and ordered the seizure of Bolsonaro's cell phones.

House arrest follows precautionary proceedings, due to the investigation into excessive tariffs involving Eduardo Bolsonaro. With the geolocation prison sentence, Bolsonaro supporters and allies are mobilizing against imprisonment in the Papuda Penitentiary Complex.

=== Conviction ===
With the ruling handed down by the First Panel of the Federal Supreme Court, Bolsonaro was sentenced to 27 years and 3 months in prison, plus a fine of R$ 376,000. His imprisonment is not expected to begin immediately, as his defense team still has the right to appeal.

As a result of the conviction, Bolsonaro is prohibited from taking office in any public position for eight years after the end of his sentences, in accordance with the Clean Record Law. Finally, the Superior Military Court (STM) must rule on the loss of his reserve captain rank, as according to the Constitution, Armed Forces officers can be expelled in the event of a criminal conviction exceeding two years in prison. If upheld, Bolsonaro will lose the right to be imprisoned in a military facility and may be imprisoned in a regular prison; since he is a former president, he may be detained in a Federal Police facility, as was the case with Lula, Temer, and Collor. On the other hand, the law that defines criminal organizations provides that those convicted of this crime must serve their sentences in maximum security prisons.

== Preventive detention ==
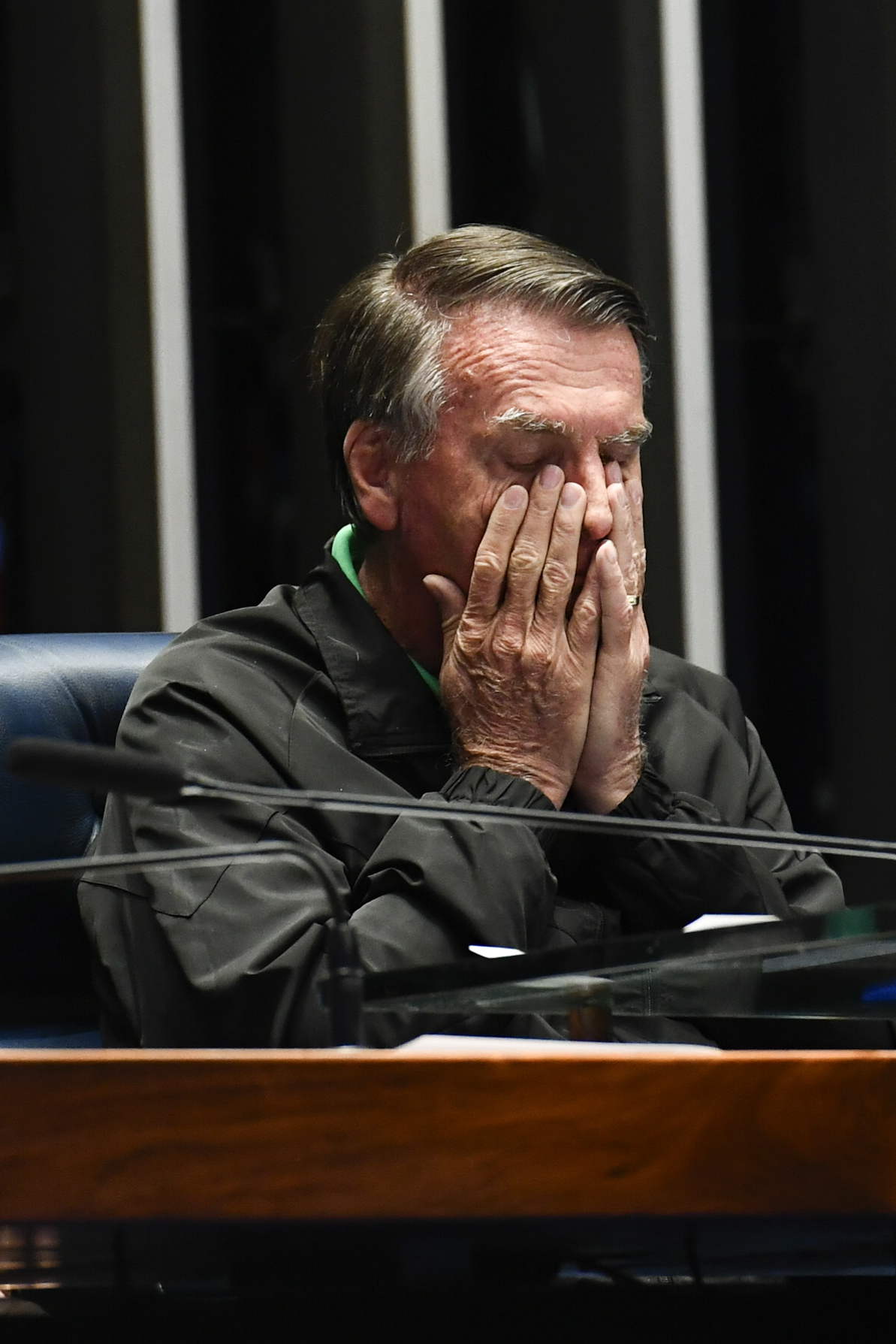
Former President Jair Bolsonaro crying during a session in the Federal Senate Plenary in July 2025. According to him, one of the reasons was the persecution that he and his family were suffering. A little over a month later, he would be arrested.

On November 22, the former president is preventively detained for an indefinite period, the Federal Police requested the Supreme Court in Brasília to issue a warrant on the grounds that the defendant had attempted to break the electronic ankle bracelet that had been placed on him as a precautionary measure.
