= Lula da Silva 2026 presidential campaign =

Brazilian presidential campaign

- Campaign: 2026 Brazilian general election
- Candidate: Luiz Inácio Lula da Silva; 39th President of Brazil; (2023–present); Geraldo Alckmin; 26th Vice President of Brazil; (2023–present)
- Affiliation: Brazil of Hope; Coalition partners: PSOL REDE Federation; Brazilian Socialist Party; Democratic Labour Party
- Status: Announced: 13 October 2025; Official nominee: 2 August 2026; Official launch: 16 August 2026; Qualified for run-off: 4 October 2026; Won election: 25 October 2026
- Slogan: Brazil Ready for More

Website
- lula.com.br

The Lula da Silva 2026 presidential campaign was officialized on 2 August 2026 in São Paulo. His running mate was incumbent vice president of Brazil, Geraldo Alckmin. Luiz Inácio Lula da Silva, who has been the current president of Brazil since 2023 after defeating incumbent Jair Bolsonaro in the 2022 election, ran for reelection for his fourth presidential term. This was da Silva's seventh presidential campaign in Brazilian presidential elections.

Lula finished second in the first round, behind Flávio Bolsonaro, but emerged victorious in the second round of the election, which was marked by a major mobilization of his supporters through social media and street demonstrations—most notably "Lula's Army", a WhatsApp channel that reached 10 million subscribers. He became the first presidential candidate in Brazil to achieve a comeback in the second round, and the first individual to be directly elected to the office four times.

== Background ==
Luiz Inácio Lula da Silva defeated Jair Bolsonaro—then president of Brazil and candidate for re-election—in the 2022 election, in the closest outcome in the history of Brazilian presidential elections. In 2024, he admitted that he could run for re-election in the 2026 race, despite his advanced age, in order to prevent "troglodytes" from returning to govern Brazil, but noted that such a decision would depend on his health condition. Lula confirmed his intention to run during a trip to Malaysia in October 2025.

The convention that formalized Luiz Inácio Lula da Silva's candidacy took place at the Expo Center Norte, in the Vila Guilherme district, in the North Zone of São Paulo. The opening of his electoral campaign took place on August 16, 2026, at the Estádio 1º de Maio in São Bernardo do Campo—a stadium that was the stage for several massive labor demonstrations between 1979 and 1980, led by Lula.

== Political positions ==
Following the diplomatic dispute between Brazil and the United States that arose after the imposition of 50% tariffs on Brazilian goods in 2025, Lula's campaign and his administration's messaging have come to center on "national sovereignty". Another narrative employed by Lula's second administration is the "defense of democracy", used after the January 8 attacks in Brasília. Lula da Silva has been advocating for increased defense investments and the development of Brazil's military equipment industry.

In his speech at the convention that formalized his candidacy, Lula advocated for the training of more scientists and investments in artificial intelligence; the creation of a program enabling elderly individuals to engage in physical, cultural, and social activities; the reinforcement of efforts to combat violence against women; and the prioritization of Brazil's control over rare earths and critical minerals.

Throughout his campaign, Lula da Silva also advocated the end of the 6x1 work schedule; the banning of online gambling platforms; an adjustment to Bolsa Família; the maintenance and expansion of social programs such as Pé-de-Meia, Mais Médicos, Farmácia Popular, and Minha Casa, Minha Vida; the forgiveness of debts owed by individual microentrepreneurs; the continuation of minimum wage increases and pensions above inflation; and the Constitutional Amendment on Public Security (PEC 18/2025), which aims to expand the constitutional role of the federal government of Brazil in public security, allowing for greater federal action in the area.

== Endorsements ==
=== Brazilian politicians ===
==== Former presidents ====
- Dilma Rousseff, 36th President of Brazil (2011–2016)

==== Ministers and executive officials ====
- Carlos Lupi, former Minister of Social Security (2023–2025) and president of Democratic Labour Party
- Carlos Fávaro, Minister of Agriculture (2023–present) and Senator for Mato Grosso (2020–present)
- Fernando Haddad, former Minister of Finance (2023–2026) and Minister of Education (2005–2012)
- Miguel Reale Júnior, former Minister of Justice (2002) (second round)
- Rui Costa, current Chief of Staff of the Presidency (2023–present)
- Simone Tebet, former Minister of Planning, Budget and Management (2023–2026)

==== Deputies ====
- Hugo Motta, Federal Deputy for Paraíba and President of the Chamber of Deputies
- Erika Hilton, Federal Deputy for São Paulo
- Gleisi Hoffmann, Federal Deputy for Paraná and former Secretary of Institutional Affairs
- Marina Silva, Federal Deputy for São Paulo
- Patrus Ananias, former Federal Deputy for Minas Gerais
- Otoni de Paula, Federal Deputy for Rio de Janeiro (second round)
- Alexandre Frota, former Federal Deputy for São Paulo and former porn star

==== Senators ====
- Camilo Santana, Senator for Ceará
- Cid Gomes, Senator for Ceará
- Daniella Ribeiro, Senator for Paraíba
- Humberto Costa, Senator for Pernambuco
- Flávio Arns, Senator for Paraná
- Jaques Wagner, Senator for Bahia
- Randolfe Rodrigues, Senator for Amapá
- Renan Filho, Senator for Alagoas
- Rogério Carvalho Santos, Senator for Sergipe
- Soraya Thronicke, Senator for Mato Grosso do Sul
- Omar Aziz, Senator for Amazonas
- Veneziano Vital do Rêgo, Senator for Paraíba

==== Governors and mayors ====
- Eduardo Paes, former Mayor of Rio de Janeiro
- Elmano de Freitas, Governor of Ceará
- Fábio Mitidieri, Governor of Sergipe
- Fátima Bezerra, Governor of Rio Grande do Norte
- João Azevêdo, Governor of Paraíba
- João Campos, former Mayor of Recife
- Jerônimo Rodrigues, Governor of Bahia
- Lucas Ribeiro, Vice Governor of Paraíba
- Rafael Fonteles, Governor of Piauí
- Rafael Greca, former mayor of Curitiba
- Raquel Lyra, Governor of Pernambuco

=== International politicians ===
==== Heads of state and government ====
- Alexander Lukashenko, President of Belarus (1994–present)
- Gabriel Boric, former President of Chile (2022–2026)
- Gustavo Petro, former President of Colombia (2022–2026)
- Pedro Sánchez, Prime Minister of Spain (2018–present) (second round)
- Rafael Correa, former President of Ecuador (2007–2017)
- Claudia Sheinbaum, President of Mexico (2024-present)

==== Member of national parliaments ====
- Carolina Corcho, Senator of Colombia (2026–present)
- Iván Cepeda, Senator of Colombia (2014–present) and Member of the Chamber of Representatives (2010–2014)
- Jean-Luc Mélenchon, Member of the National Assembly of France (2017–2022) and Member of the European Parliament (2009–2017)
- Juan Grabois, National Deputy of Argentina (2025–present)
- María José Pizarro, Senator of Colombia (2022–present) and Member of the Chamber of Representatives (2018–2022)

==== Executive officials ====
- Camila Vallejo, Minister General Secretariat of Government of Chile (2022–2026) and Member of the Chamber of Deputies of Chile (2014–2022)
- Sergio Massa, Minister of Economy of Argentina (2022–2023) and National Deputy (2013–2017, 2019–2022)

==== Other politicians ====
- Axel Kicillof, Governor of Buenos Aires Province (2019–present)
- Sofía Petro, Colombian activist and daughter of Gustavo Petro

=== Non-political ===
==== Actors and actresses ====
- Andressa Urach, reality television personality
- Alfonso Herrera, Mexican actor
- Betty Gofman, actress
- Bruna Marquezine, actress
- Caio Blat, actor
- Cláudia Abreu, actress
- Débora Falabella, actress
- Elisa Lucinda, actress
- Fernanda Torres, actress and writer
- Glória Pires, actress
- Guillermo del Toro, Mexican filmmaker
- Javier Bardem, Spanish actor
- Leona Cavalli, actress
- Malu Mader, actress
- Maria Flor, actress
- Mark Ruffalo, American actor
- Marieta Severo, actress
- Mel Maia, actress
- Paolla Oliveira, actress
- Pedro Cardoso, actor
- Pedro Pascal, Chilean-American actor
- Paulo Vieira, comedian
- Pedro Almodóvar, Spanish film director
- Rodrigo Simas, actor
- Sonia Braga, actress
- Sophie Charlotte, actress
- Tilda Swinton, Scottish actress
- Wagner Moura, actor
- Xuxa, actress and singer
- Zezé Polessa, actress

==== Musicians ====
- Adriana Calcanhotto, singer
- Anitta, singer
- Andreas Kisser, guitarist
- Carlinhos Brown, singer
- Chico Buarque, singer
- Chico César, musician
- Caetano Veloso, singer
- Daniela Mercury, singer
- Duda Beat, singer
- Djavan, singer
- Fernanda Abreu, singer
- Gilberto Gil, singer
- Gretchen, singer
- Geraldo Azevedo, songwriter
- Ivete Sangalo, singer
- Jão, songwriter
- Luísa Sonza, singer
- Maria Bethânia, singer
- Marina Sena, singer
- Marisa Monte, singer
- Matuê, rapper
- Manu Gavassi, singer
- Madonna, American singer
- Paulinho da Viola, singer
- Roger Waters, English singer
- Tony Bellotto, guitarist
- Tom Morello, American guitarist
- The Strokes, American indie rock band
- Xamã, rapper
- Zélia Duncan, singer
- Zeca Pagodinho, singer

==== Sports ====
- Jackson Irvine, Australian footballer
- Juninho Pernambucano, former footballer
- Neto, former footballer and pundit
- Paulinho, footballer
- Raí, former footballer
- Raphinha, footballer (second round)
- Walter Casagrande, former footballer and pundit
- Gabriela Guimarães, volleyball player
- Richarlison, footballer
- Hebert Conceição, boxer
- Fernanda Garay, former volleyball player
- Tifanny Abreu, volleyball player
- Ary Borges, footballer
- Formiga, former footballer
- Daiane dos Santos, former artistic gymnast

==== Public figures ====
- Cellbit, streamer
- Fátima Bernardes, journalist and TV host
- Greta Thunberg, Swedish activist (second round)
- Hailey Bieber, American model and businesswoman (second round)
- João Amoêdo, banker and founder of New Party (second round)
- Julian Assange, Australian programmer and founder of WikiLeaks (second round)
- Samara Martins, activist (second round)

=== Organizations ===
==== Brazilian organizations ====
- Centre of People's Movements
- Estação Primeira de Mangueira
- Landless Workers' Movement
- Movimento dos Atingidos por Barragens

==== Brazilian political parties ====
- Popular Unity
- United Socialist Workers' Party

==== International organizations ====
Organizations

- Latin American Council of Social Sciences

Political parties

- Broad Front (Chile)
- Communist Party of Chile
- Movement of Popular Participation

== Candidates ==
The following politicians announced their candidacy. The political parties had up to 15 August 2026 to formally register their candidates.

| Lula da Silva | Geraldo Alckmin |
|---|---|
| for President | for Vice President |
| President of Brazil (2023–present) | Vice President of Brazil (2023–present) |

== See also ==
- Lulism
- Lula da Silva 2022 presidential campaign
- Flávio Bolsonaro 2026 presidential campaign
- Ronaldo Caiado 2026 presidential campaign
