= Brazilian Congressional Bill No. 896 =

Brazilian Congressional Bill No. 896, popularly known as the Misogyny Bill, is a bill in the Brazilian National Congress. Introduced to the Federal Senate in 2023 by Senator Ana Paula Lobato, the bill amends Law No. 7,716, of 5 January 1989, and, in the wording approved by the Senate, also the Penal Code, to provide for crimes committed on account of misogyny. The proposal seeks to include these behaviors among the crimes of discrimination or prejudice and to expand the criminal protection of offenses and incitements motivated by hatred or aversion to women.

In the version approved by the Senate, the text defines misogyny as "conduct that expresses hatred or aversion towards women". The proposal now covers, within the scope of Law No. 7,716/1989, insults committed due to misogyny, the practice, inducement or incitement to discrimination for this reason, and the judge's consideration of the "condition of being a woman" as an interpretative criterion for characterizing discriminatory treatment. The substitute bill sent to the Chamber of Deputies also amends Article 141 of the Penal Code to provide for double the penalty when the crime is committed against a woman in the context of domestic and family violence.

According to the justification for the proposal in the Senate, the measure aims to strengthen criminal protection for women, complementing existing norms to more clearly punish expressions of hatred against women and expand the fight against violence motivated by misogyny in the country. In the parliamentary debate that preceded the vote in the Plenary, rapporteur Soraya Thronicke stated that the proposal responded to the growth of misogynistic discourse and forms of violence against women, including in digital media.

During the legislative process, the bill received a favorable opinion from the Human Rights and Participatory Legislation Committee on 8 May 2024 and from the Constitution, Justice and Citizenship Committee on 22 October 2025. On 24 March 2026, it was approved by the Senate Plenary by 67 votes in favor and none against, in the form of a substitute bill, and was sent to the Chamber of Deputies on 30 March 2026, where it awaited review.
