= Faculdade de Medicina de São José do Rio Preto =

Coordinates: 20.8200°S 49.3789°W

Faculdade de Medicina de São José do Rio Preto (Portuguese for Faculty of Medicine of São José do Rio Preto), best known as Famerp, is a public medical school located in the city of São José do Rio Preto, in the State of São Paulo, Brazil. Founded in 1968, it is one of the six state medical schools in São Paulo and its medical course is taught in the traditional system. One of the most highly regarded medical and nursing schools in the country, it stands out for having the second-largest teaching hospital in Brazil, the Base Hospital of São José do Rio Preto, which is second only to the Hospital das Clínicas of São Paulo. It was one of the few Brazilian higher education institutions to receive maximum score from the Ministry of Education of Brazil in 2009.

It was the only school of medicine in the state of São Paulo to obtain the highest score in the National Student Performance Exam (ENADE) held in 2016. In 2018, for the fourth year in a row, the Famerp medical course broke the record for candidates, with 16,982 thousand applicants competing for 80 places, an average of 212 candidates/place (0.47% acceptance rate). The course offered in Rio Preto is one of the most popular in the country.
