= Metrópoles =

Newspaper in Brazil

- Type: Online newspaper
- Owner: Grupo Metrópoles de Comunicação
- Founded: September 8, 2015
- Headquarters: Brasília, Brazil
- Country: Brazil
- Website: www.metropoles.com

Metrópoles is a Brazilian online newspaper based in Brasília. According to Comscore, the news site is among the three most read in the country, with 60 million unique users reading the site monthly, according to Google Analytics. The newspaper was founded on September 8, 2015, after the extinction of the Veja Brasília magazine. It is owned by Grupo Metrópoles de Comunicação, which also runs a book publishing house, a film production company and a radio station with the same name. The group is owned by the family of businessman and politician Luiz Estevão.
