= Samara Martins =

Brazilian politician

- Samara in 2026

Personal details
- Born: 31 August 1987 (age 39) Belo Horizonte, Minas Gerais, Brazil
- Party: Popular Unity (UP)
- Occupation: Dentist, politician
- Profession: Public health dentist

Samara Martins (born 31 August 1987) is a Brazilian dentist and politician affiliated with Popular Unity (UP), where she serves as national vice president. She has been active in social movements and was the vice-presidential candidate in the 2022 Brazilian general election and a pre-candidate for President of Brazil in 2026.

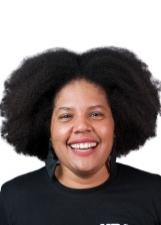
Samara Martins in 2026

== Early life and career ==
Samara Martins was born in Belo Horizonte, the capital of Minas Gerais, Brazil. She works as a dentist in the Unified Health System (SUS).

She began her political trajectory in the student movement, participating in the Metropolitan Association of Secondary Students of Greater Belo Horizonte (AMES-BH). She later joined the National Union of Students (UNE), where she served as director for women's affairs.

In addition to her party activities, Martins is involved in social movements such as the Olga Benário Women's Movement and the Black Revolutionary Front.

== Political career ==
In 2022, Martins was the vice-presidential candidate on the ticket headed by Leonardo Péricles, representing Popular Unity. The ticket was the only one in that election composed entirely of Black candidates.

The ticket received 53,519 votes (0.05%) in the first round.

In 2026, she launched her pre-candidacy for President of Brazil and was identified as the only woman among the pre-candidates at that time.

== Political positions ==
Martins supports the decriminalization and legalization of abortion.

Her policy proposals include:

- nationalization of the banking system and popular control of finance;
- agrarian reform with land nationalization;
- public ownership of collective transport;
- elected mandates for judges;
- reduction of the workday to six hours;
- support for socialism and opposition to capitalism and imperialism.

== Electoral history ==
Year	Election	Party	Office	Votes	%	Result
2022	Presidential	UP	Vice President	53,519	0.05%	Not elected
2026	Presidential	UP	President	—	—	TBA
