= Gualberto =

Gualberto is a given name and surname of Italian origin. Notable people with this name include:

== Surname ==
- Flávio Gualberto (born 1993), Brazilian volleyball player
- João Bosco Gualberto de Freitas, also known Biro-Biro (footballer, born 1974)
- Márcio Gualberto (born 1976)

== Given name ==
- Giovan Gualberto Brunetti (1706–1787), Italian composer
- Giovanni Gualberto Bottarelli, Italian lyricist
- Giovanni Gualberto Magli, Italian castrato
- Gualberto Campos (born 1981), Venezuelan football player
- Gualberto Castro (1934–2019), Mexican singer, actor and television presenter
- Gualberto Fabricio de Vagad, Spanish monk and historian
- Gualberto Fernández (born 1941), Salvadorian football player
- Gualberto García Pérez, Spanish musician
- Gualberto Gutiérrez (born 1940), Uruguayan boxer
- Gualberto Ibarreto (born 1947), Venezuelan folk singer
- Gualberto Jara (born 1959), Paraguayan football manager
- Gualberto Luiz da Silva Júnior (born 1990), Brazilian football player
- Gualberto Mojica (born 1984), Bolivian football player
- Gualberto Ruaño
- Gualberto Vega
- Gualberto Villarroel (1908–1946), Bolivian head of state
- Gualberto do Rosário (born 1950), Cape Verdian politician
- José Gualberto Padilla (1829–1896)
- João Gualberto de Oliveira (1788–1852), Portuguese politician
- Juan Gualberto Espínola González (born 1953), Paraguayan football player
- Juan Gualberto González (1851–1912), Paraguayan politician
- Juan Gualberto Gómez (1854–1933), Cuban revolutionary leader
