= Catholic Church in Brazil =

- Portuguese: Igreja Católica no Brasil; Latin: Ecclesia Catholica in Brasilia
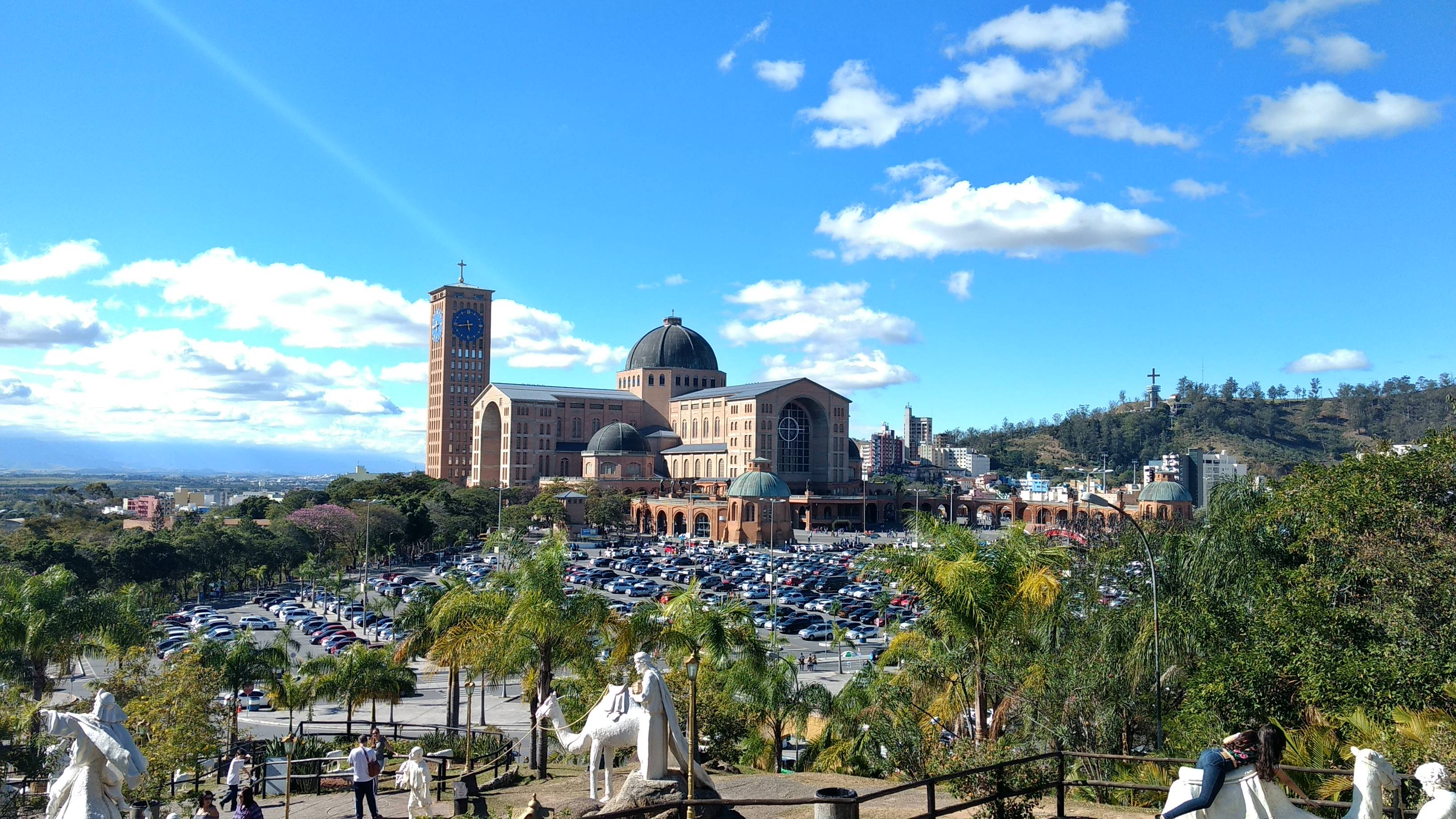
- The Basilica of the National Shrine of Our Lady of Aparecida in Aparecida. It's the second largest Catholic church in the world, after St. Peter's Basilica in Vatican City.
- Type: National polity
- Classification: Catholic
- Orientation: Latin
- Scripture: Bible
- Theology: Catholic theology
- Polity: Episcopal
- Governance: CNBB
- Pope: Leo XIV
- President: Walmor Oliveira de Azevedo
- Primate: Sérgio da Rocha
- Region: Brazil
- Language: Portuguese, Latin
- Headquarters: Brasília
- Origin: c. 1500; 526 years ago Colonial Brazil, Portuguese Empire
- Separations: Brazilian Catholic Apostolic Church
- Parishes: 12,013
- Members: 119 million
- Official website: CNBB

The Brazilian Catholic Church, or Catholic Church in Brazil, is part of the worldwide Catholic Church, under the spiritual leadership of the Pope in Rome, and the influential National Conference of Bishops of Brazil (Portuguese: Conferência Nacional dos Bispos do Brasil - CNBB). It is composed of over 400 primary and auxiliary bishops and archbishops. There are 44 ecclesiastical provinces, which have 275 dioceses, eparchies, ordinariates, and territorial prelatures in Brazil. The primate of Brazil is Dom Sérgio da Rocha.

The Catholic Church is the largest denomination in the country, where 119 million people, or 56.75% of the Brazilian population, were self-declared Catholics in 2022. These figures made Brazil the single country with the largest Catholic community in the world.

According to a 2014 Pew Research Center study, 81% of Brazil's population was raised Catholic, but only 61% identified as Catholic in that year, a difference of 20 percentage points. One of the challenges faced by the Catholic Church in Brazil is the loss of adherents to Protestant churches and to irreligion. The 2022 Brazilian census found that 56.7% of Brazilians identified as Catholic, a decrease of 8.4 percentage points from 2010, when 65.1% of the population aged 10 and older identified as Catholic. During the same period, Protestants increased from 21.6% to 26.9%. In 1991, 83.34% of Brazilians identified as Catholics. In a Datafolha survey conducted at the end of 2024, approximately 50% of the surveyed population identified as Catholic, while 25% identified as Protestant.

According to the Pontifical Yearbook of the Holy See, in 2025, the number of members of the Brazilian Catholic Church is disputed compared to official government records, purporting a rebound of the population. The Brazilian Catholic Church reported having 182 million faithful, out of an estimated population of 212 million inhabitants, or 86% of the population. However, these Vatican statistics are not generally recognized, as they were not documented in the previous national census of 2022. Although they are self-reported data, the statistics of other Brazilian Christian denominations after the 2022 census have neither been challenged nor considered invalid, as is the case with the Evangelical Lutheran Church of Brazil or the Assemblies of God in Brazil, for example.

== History ==
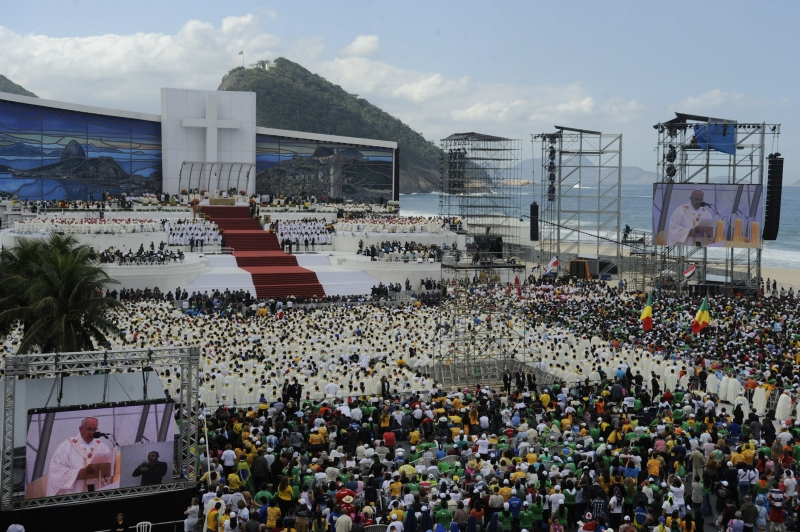
The Final Mass of the World Youth Day 2013, at Copacabana Beach. Pope Francis was the third Pope to visit Brazil.

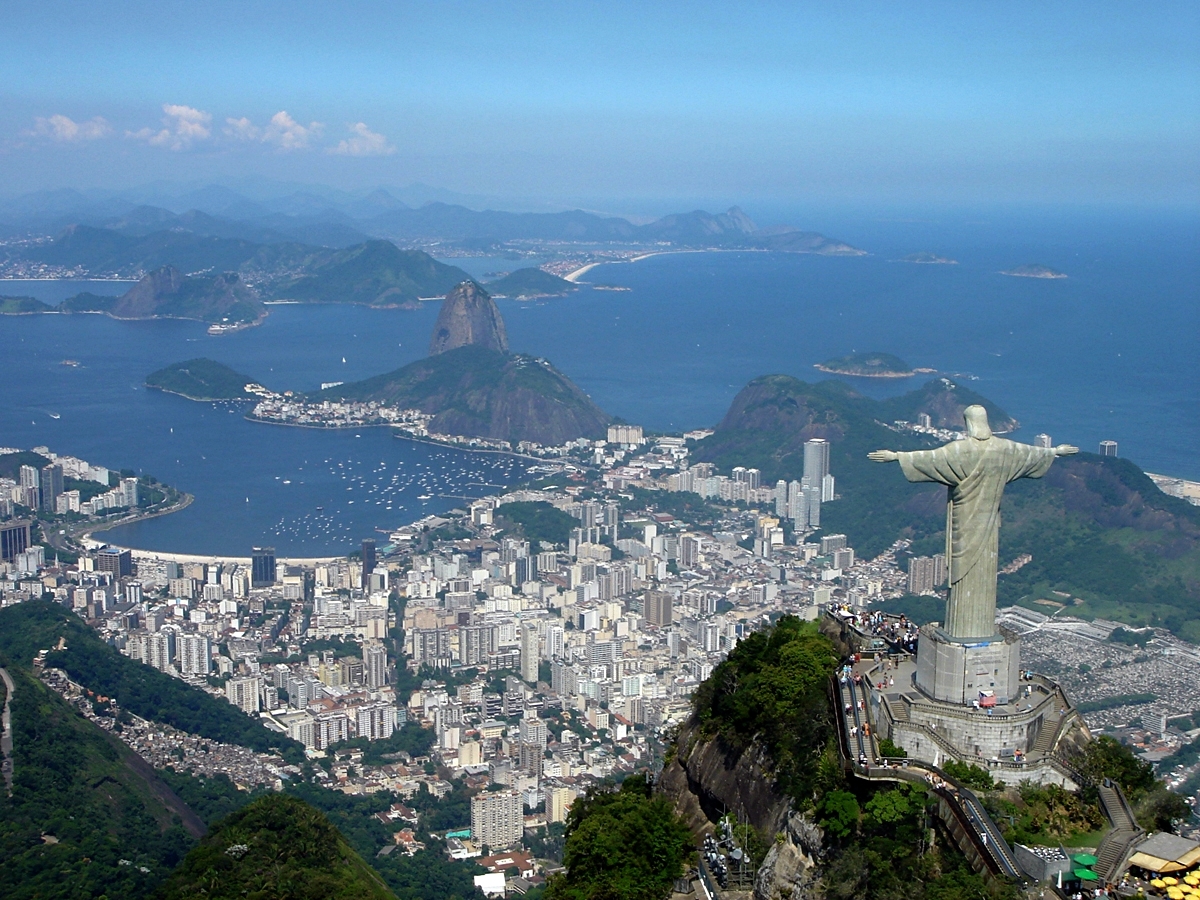
Christ the Redeemer statue in Brazil

According to the tradition, the first Catholic mass celebrated in Brazil took place on 26 April 1500. It was celebrated by a priest who arrived in the country along with the Portuguese pirates and explorers to claim possession of the newfound land. The first diocese in Brazil was erected more than 50 years later, in 1551.

Brazil's strong Catholic heritage can be traced to the Iberian missionary zeal, with the 15th-century goal of spreading Christianity. The church missions began to hamper the government policy of exploiting the natives. In 1782 the Jesuits were suppressed, and the government tightened its control over the church.

Catholicism was the predominant faith during colonial rule, then in 1824 became the official religion of an independent Brazil which also guaranteed freedom of religion for its citizens. The Brazilian government has been secular since the constitution of 1891 and the church has remained politically influential. In the late 19th century, the Catholic population of Iberian origin was reinforced by a large number of Italian Catholics who immigrated to Brazil, as well as some Polish and German Catholic immigrants. In 1889 Brazil became a republic and approved a constitution separating the church from the state, a trend followed by all of the country's seven republican constitutions. Prior to that, during the Empire of Brazil, Catholicism was the official religion of the country. In practice, separation of church and state in the country is weak as government officials generally avoid taking actions that may offend the church which represents a large majority of citizens.

A recent example of the church's influence over political questions was the change conducted by the federal government in the Third National Program of Human Rights in regard to its proposal to legalize abortion, after pressure from the National Conference of Brazilian Bishops. That particular change, along with others, was denounced by the Amnesty International. Nevertheless, the government kept issues contrary to church teaching in the program, such as its support for same-sex marriage and same-sex adoption.

In the early 20th to mid-20th century, Bishop Carlos Duarte Costa became a public critic and was excommunicated for disagreeing with papal infallibility, priestly confession, divorce, and clerical celibacy. He would then establish the Brazilian Catholic Apostolic Church and elevate the Freemason, Salomão Barbosa Ferraz, who would be received as a married bishop within Roman Catholicism and participate in the Second Vatican Council.

In the late 20th century the church's liberation theology movement, which focuses on the poor as the primary recipients of Christ's message, helped in the quest for social justice. The church organized ecclesiastical base communities throughout the country to work for social and political causes at the local level. Despite the support of the higher clergy for the military, the progressive wing managed to make the church practically the only legitimate focus of resistance and defense of basic human rights during military rule, as well as a main advocate for social rights and human dignity in the Constitutional Assembly of 1987–1988. When then Cardinal Ratzinger became responsible for the Congregation for the Doctrine of the Faith, he launched a successful campaign against the liberation theology, and the conservative wing of the church gained power. Catholics then saw the rise of the Catholic Charismatic Renewal movement, as a way to counter the rapid growth of Pentecostal Protestantism in the country. According to Luis Lugo, director of the Pew Forum on Religion & Public Life, “pentecostalism no longer is something confined outside the Catholic Church, it is now firmly within the form of various charismatic tendencies and movements”.

During his five-day visit to Brazil in May 2007 Pope Benedict XVI canonized Frei Galvão, who became the first Brazilian-born saint. Both the Pope's visit and the canonisation aimed at reinvigorating the local church. Brazil was also the first foreign country visited by Benedict's successor Pope Francis.

== Demographics ==
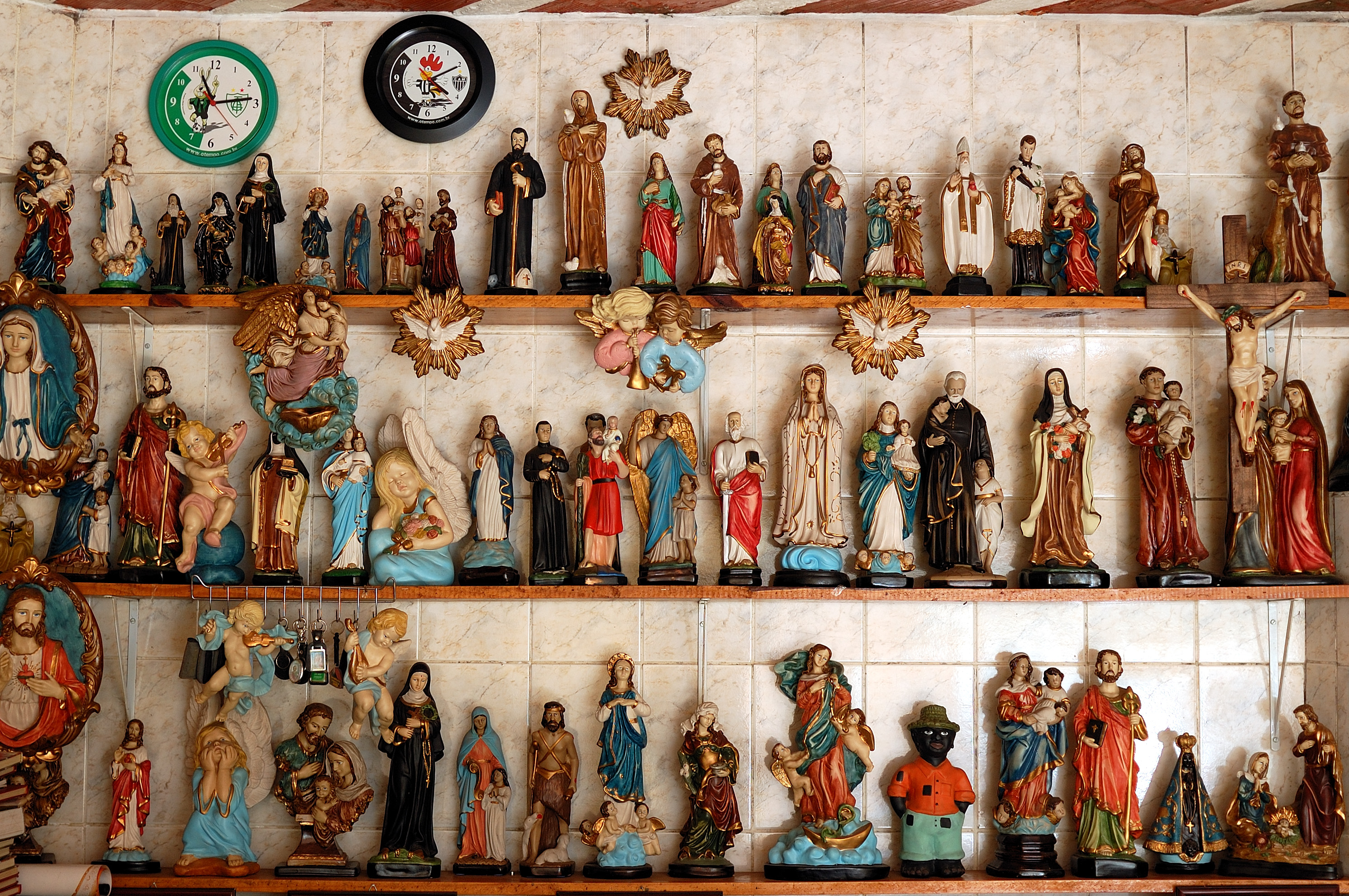
Statues of saints in Ouro Preto, Minas Gerais

According to a 2007 poll conducted by the Pew Research Center's Forum on Religion & Public Life, more than 60 percent of the urban population of Brazil claims a Catholic affiliation. A 2020 poll by Datafolha suggests that the Catholic population is closer to 50 percent of the country and decreasing, with Evangelical Protestant groups growing as a proportion, although ARDA reports Catholicism at 70.57% of the population. Religious syncretism is widespread among Brazilian Catholics. There is an overlay of Afro-Brazilian religions (such as Candomblé, Quimbanda and Umbanda) with Catholic beliefs and practices, which many Catholic Brazilians do not find inconsistent with their faith. An example is the Feast of Bonfim, a ritual in which mães-de-santo gather to wash the stairs of the Church of Nosso Senhor do Bonfim in Salvador, Bahia. Catholics are far more likely to believe in good luck charms, fortune-tellers, faith-healers and astrology than are converts to Protestantism.

Religious change in Brazil is frequent. According to polling institute Datafolha, as of July 2013, approximately 57% of those aged over 16 years old were Catholic, while evangelicals constituted 28%.

According to America Magazine in 2003, Brazilian Catholics have the highest score in the world on the image of God as a loving Father. They are also more likely to see human nature as good rather than corrupt, and the world as good rather than evil. Brazilian Catholics are less likely to believe in the literal, word-for-word interpretation of the Bible than Protestants. They are also more likely to accept premarital sex, cohabitation before marriage, homosexuality and abortion. About 40% attend Masses at least once a month—approximately the same level as that of American Catholics. Almost 75% pray every day, but only 12% engage in church activities; only 26% say they are "very religious". More than one out of five of those who were raised Catholics leave the church, most of them taking on no religious affiliation or Protestantism. However, Catholicism has the highest rate of retention. More than 40% of those who were raised Protestant are no longer Protestant after adulthood; the Catholic Church picks up 16% of those who were raised Protestants.

By race, 66.4% of whites are Catholic, along with 58.2% of blacks, 59.9% of East Asians, 64.1% of browns, and 50.7% of American Indians.

=== Decline of adherents ===
In recent decades, there has been a notable decline in the number of Catholics in the Brazilian population, especially since the 1990s. In 1872, 99.71% of Brazilians identified as Catholic; 95% in 1940; 83.34% in 1991; 73.89% in 2000; and 68.43% in 2009. At the same time, the number of Protestants, people with no religion, and followers of other faiths has grown. According to a 2014 Pew Research Center study, 54% of Brazilian Protestants said they were raised as Catholics.

Religious affiliation in Brazil by year
Year	Catholics (%)	Protestants (%)	No religion (%)	Others (%)
1994	75	14	5	6
2001	62	21	7	10
2006	68	20	5	7
2010	63	24	6	7
2016	50	29	14	7
2022	49	26	14	—

According to a 2009 study by Fundação Getúlio Vargas (FGV), Catholicism in Brazil has been losing followers mainly in impoverished urban areas, particularly to Pentecostal Evangelical churches and to non-religiosity. The study pointed out that Brazil's "old poverty," particularly rural areas in the Northeast, which benefit from government programs, remain predominantly Catholic. Meanwhile, the "new poverty," referring to the outskirts of major cities—often underserved by social programs—has been shifting toward Protestantism and non-religion.

One explanation for the decline in Catholicism is internal migration. In Brazil, Evangelical churches tend to grow in regions experiencing agricultural frontier expansion, in urban slums, and in metropolitan municipalities—places with high numbers of migrants from other regions. These migrants often settle in areas lacking both government presence and Catholic Church infrastructure, which "lacks the agility to send priests and establish parishes." In contrast, Evangelical churches are more flexible and quicker to establish congregations, thereby filling this institutional void. This shift is less common in areas with low migration rates or in rural interiors, where the population is more likely to remain affiliated with the religion in which they were raised.

The Catholic Church has been unable to keep up with the new Brazil due to its centralized, hierarchical, slow-moving structure that is resistant to change. For instance, while Catholic churches are present in the centers of virtually every city in the country, they have not kept pace with the demographic expansion in the peripheries of major urban centers. The shortage of priests and the physical distance from believers hinder the Church's ability to spread its doctrine and engage large segments of the population in everyday church life. Clericalism serves the interests of the clergy to the detriment of grassroots participation. Moreover, scandals involving pedophilia cast doubt on the moral integrity of many priests, while the issue of clerical celibacy continues to divide the Church and its two Popes.

== Education ==
As the largest Catholic country in the world, Catholic education has a great tradition in Brazil. The Society of Jesus founded the first schools in the country, with the aim of evangelizing Native-Brazilians. In the late 18th century, Portuguese minister Marquis of Pombal attacked and expelled the Jesuits from Portugal and its overseas possessions. He seized the Jesuit schools and introduced educational reforms all over the Empire. Since then, public schools have been secular, but private Catholic schools are among the best in the country.

According to the Ministry of Education, there are more than 30 Catholic universities in Brazil. The first was the Pontifical Catholic University of Rio Grande do Sul, founded by Marist Brothers on 1931. Another influential is the Pontifical Catholic University of Rio de Janeiro who is one of best private universities in the country, and behind only the Federal University of Rio de Janeiro at the state avaliation rankings. The Pontifical Catholic University of Minas Gerais had been chosen by the Ministry as the best private university, and the best in the state of Minas Gerais, the previous year. In 1969, the Pontifical Catholic University of São Paulo became the first higher education institute in Brazil to offer a post-graduation course.

== Organization ==
In Brazil, there are a total of 275 particular churches—consisting of:

- 45 archdioceses,
- 215 dioceses (2 of which are Eastern rite eparchies under Latin jurisdiction),
- 9 territorial prelatures,
- the Archeparchy of São João Batista em Curitiba,
- the Eparchy of Imaculada Conceição in Prudentópolis under the Ukrainian Greek Catholic Church
- the Armenian Catholic Apostolic Exarchate of Latin America and Mexico,
- the Ordinariate for the Faithful of Eastern Rites in Brazil,
- the Military Ordinariate of Brazil,
- the Personal Apostolic Administration of Saint John Mary Vianney.

== Notable people ==
- Pedro I of Brazil
- Pedro II of Brazil
- Princess Isabel
- Teresa Cristina of the Two Sicilies
- Machado de Assis

== See also ==
- Abortion in Brazil
  - 2009 Brazilian girl abortion case
- Catholic Electoral League
- Centro Dom Bosco
- Demographics of Brazil
- Fraternity Campaign
- Neo-Thomism in Brazil
- Our Lady of Aparecida
- Pan-Amazonian Ecclesial Network (REPAM)
- Papal visits to Brazil
- Religion in Brazil
  - Brazilian Catholic Apostolic Church

=== Lists ===
- List of Brazilian Saints
- List of Catholic dioceses in Brazil
