= Ivo Lorscheiter =

- Bishop of Santa Maria
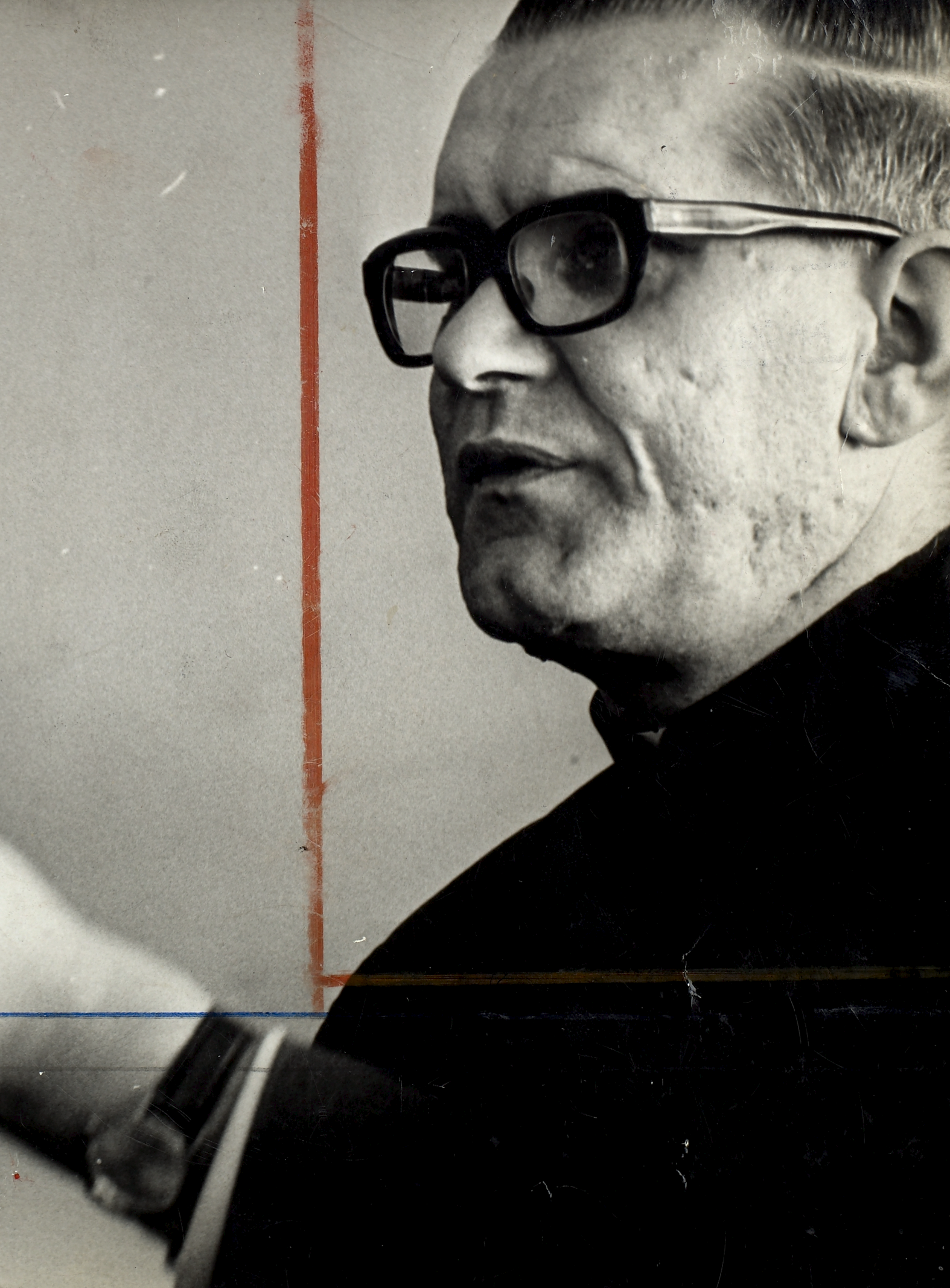
- Diocese: Santa Maria
- Appointed: 5 February 1974
- Retired: 24 March 2004
- Predecessor: Érico Ferrari
- Successor: Hélio Adelar Rubert
- Previous post: Auxiliary Bishop of Porto Alegre (1965–74)

Orders
- Ordination: 20 December 1952
- Consecration: 6 March 1966 by Alfredo Scherer

Personal details
- Born: December 7, 1926 São José do Hortêncio, Rio Grande do Sul, Brazil
- Died: March 5, 2007 (aged 80)

José Ivo Lorscheiter (7 December 1927 – 5 March 2007) was a Brazilian prelate of the Catholic Church. He was a bishop from 1965 to his retirement in 2004. He was a leading proponent of liberation theology and denounced abuses of human rights by the military regime that controlled Brazil in the anos de chumbo from 1964 to 1985.

== Biography ==
Lorscheiter was born on 7 December 1927 in São José do Hortêncio, in the state of Rio Grande do Sul in the south of Brazil, one of seven brothers born to a family of farmers. His parents were the descendants of German immigrants. His surname was "Lorscheider", but it was recorded incorrectly when his birth was registered, and the incorrect "Lorscheiter" remained with him for the rest of his life. He came from a religious family, and other relatives joined the church: Cardinal Aloísio Lorscheider was a cousin.

He attended the local Catholic seminary at Gravataí from 1939 to 1945, and then studied philosophy at the seminary in São Leopoldo from 1946 to 1948. He studied theology at the Salesian Pontifical University in Rome from 1949 to 1953, receiving his doctorate in 1956. He was ordained in Rome on 20 December 1952. He returned to Brazil to teach at the seminary in Gravataí and then became director of the seminary in Viamão. He also taught at the Pontifícia Universidade Católica do Rio Grande do Sul.

Pope Paul VI appointed him auxiliary bishop of Porto Alegre and titular bishop of Tamada on 12 November 1965, the year after a military dictatorship took control of the country. He received his episcopal consecration on 6 March from Archbishop Alfredo Scherer, with his cousin Bishop Aloísio Lorscheider as one of the co-consecrators.

Lorscheiter was involved in secret negotiations between the church and the military from 1970 to 1974, but also openly criticised the military regime. Hundreds of political opponents were imprisoned, tortured, or killed. He became known as "Dom Ivo" by his supporters.

Pope Paul VI appointed him bishop of Santa Maria on 5 February 1974. He was elected secretary-general of the National Conference of Bishops of Brazil for two four-year terms in 1971 and 1975, and then president for two four-year terms in 1979 and 1983, following immediately after his more radical cousin Aloísio Lorscheider each time. The 1971 election marked a turning point, establishing the Conference as a leading voice in opposition to the military regime. The Brazilian bishops remained ideologically divided during these years, and his re-election to the presidency in April 1983 at a "controversy-plagued" meeting of Brazil's bishops came on the third ballot.

At a Vatican synod of bishops in November-December 1985, he presented a detailed rebuttal of a September 1984 critique of liberation theology by Cardinal Joseph Ratzinger, Prefect of the Congregation for the Doctrine of the Faith. He said:

Against false interpretations, it must be clarified that liberation theology is not a theology of violence or one that pushes toward violence. It is not a theology that assumes or justifies Marxist ideology. Nor does it apply European political ideology to Latin America. Nor does it break with Catholic theological tradition.... [It] presupposes a new consciousness of the context of oppression [and] a conversion toward the poor and a commitment to their liberation.... Liberation theology is indispensable to the church's activity and to the social commitment of Christians, even if it carries with it risks.

According to Peter Hebblethwaite, Lorscheiter and others who defended liberation theology led Pope John Paul to recognize that there was more potential in that theology than Ratzinger and his Latin American allies allowed. In April 1986, the pope wrote the bishops of Brazil a letter describing liberation theology as "not only opportune but useful and necessary".

Lorscheiter suffered from poor health throughput his life and was hospitalized several times in his later years. Pope John Paul accepted his resignation as bishop of Santa Maria on 24 March 2004. He died on 5 March 2007 in Santa Maria, Rio Grande do Sul, after stomach surgery.
