= LGBTQ rights in Paraná =

- Legal status: Legal since 1830, age of consent equalised
- Gender identity: Gender change allowed, official standard for altering legal sex doesn't require surgery since 2018
- Military: Allowed to serve openly
- Discrimination protections: Yes, since 2019

Family rights
- Recognition of relationships: Same-sex marriage since 2013
- Adoption: Legal since 2010

Lesbian, gay, bisexual, transgender and queer (LGBTQ) people in the Brazilian state of Paraná enjoy many of the same legal protections available to non-LGBTQ people. However, according to research by the Agência Diadorim, 16 anti-LGBTQ bills were introduced in the Legislative Assembly of Paraná.

== Legality ==
In 1830, Brazilian Emperor Pedro I sanctioned the Imperial Penal Code, removing all references to sodomy from Brazilian law.

=== Recognition of same-sex unions ===
In 2004, the first case of recognition of same-sex unions in Brazil occurred with a binational Englishman and a Brazilian. This legal precedent encouraged other couples to marry around the country. At the time of the ceremony, in the form of common-law marriage, this was a status that, until then, was only granted to opposite-sex couples. The couple had lived together for fourteen years, in the Brazilian city of Curitiba.

On 26 March 2013, the General Inspector of Justice of Paraná ruled that same-sex marriage and conversion of the stable unions to marriage should be possible using the normal marriage procedures.

== Adoption and parenting ==
May 14, 2009 − a gay couple was the first to win in court the right of adoption in the Brazilian State of Paraná. A decision of the 2nd Court of Childhood, Youth and Adoption, changed the life of a homosexual couple who live in Curitiba. Two years previously, the gay couple had attempted to adopt a child. They had their request granted by a judge who ruled that the couple were living in a stable and affectionate union, and were able to raise a child of either sex and age in a healthy environment.

October 27, 2010 − the Justice of the city of Cascavel, Paraná, authorized the adoption of an eight-year-old child with cerebral palsy by a gay couple who had been living together for twelve years. The authorization is irreversible, according to Judge Sergio Luiz Kreuz, who granted the application for adoption based on the decision of the Superior Court of Justice.

September 16, 2011 - the Justice of the city of Maringá, Paraná authorized the adoption of two children by a lesbian couple.

== Gender identity and expression ==
In 2021, state representative Mara Lima (PSC) introduced a bill to ban unisex bathrooms in the state. On November 16 of the same year, a similar bill introduced by councilman Ezequias Barros (PMB) was approved in Curitiba.

In 2023, the Court of Justice of the State of Paraná (TJPR) published a provision that guarantees the inclusion of the term "non-binary" in the gender marker of the Civil Registry. However, in November of the same year, the Court revoked this provision, establishing that the right to administrative replacement of first name and sex in civil registration does not cover the possibility of expanding genders, limited to "male" and "female".

On October 4, 2023, the Curitiba City Council approved a motion of protest against a resolution from the Ministry of Human Rights and Citizenship that recommended students use public restrooms in schools in accordance with their gender identity.

In 2025, the Court of Justice of the State of Paraná (TJPR) authorized a third gender option on documents.

=== Londrina sports' ban ===
On April 26, 2024, the city of Londrina enacted a law banning transgender people from competing in sports according to their gender identity, establishing a fine of R$ 10,000.00 for non-compliance. The law was mocked for including cisgender people in the ban. In March 2026, LGBTQ rights organizations filed a lawsuit in the Supreme Federal Court (STF) against the law.

On February 26, 2026, the City Council approved a motion to bar transgender athlete Tiffanny Abreu from competing in the Brazilian Women's Volleyball Cup. The Brazilian Volleyball Confederation filed a lawsuit in the STF against the city law.

On the same day, Justice Cármen Lúcia issued a preliminary injunction allowing Tiffany to compete in the event.

On August 7, 2026, the rapporteur for the lawsuits, Justice Cristiano Zanin, voted to strike down the law.

== Education ==
On October 2017, councilman Dr. Brito (PEN) proposed two draft bills to institute the Escola sem Partido program in schools in Foz do Iguaçu. Amid the approval of one of these bills, teachers and LGBTQ rights activists protested against it. On July 5, 2018, Justice Dias Toffoli issued a preliminary injunction suspending the law, after a lawsuit filed by the Communist Party of Brazil (PCdoB). On May 8, 2020, the Supreme Federal Court voted unanimously to overturn the city law.

On November 13, 2017, the Arapongas City Council approved a bill prohibiting the teaching of "gender ideology" in the city's schools. The bill was signed into law by the city's mayor, Sergio Onofre da Silva, on December 1st.

On September 13, 2018, the Londrina City Council approved a law prohibiting the teaching of gender issues in schools. On December 13, 2019, Justice Luís Roberto Barroso issued a preliminary injunction overturning the municipal law.

In 2021, councilman Celso Dal Molin (PL) introduced a bill to prohibit gender-neutral language in Cascavel schools. On April 4, 2022, the bill was approved in its first reading.

On December 13, 2022, the Legislative Assembly of Paraná approved a bill to prohibit gender-neutral language in schools. The state governor, Ratinho Júnior, signed the bill into law on January 18, 2023. On December 15, the National LGBTI Alliance and the Brazilian Association of Homotransaffective Families filed a lawsuit against the law in the Supreme Federal Court.

== Discrimination protections ==
On June 13, 2019, the Brazilian Supreme Court ruled that discrimination on the basis of sexual orientation and gender identity is a crime akin to racism.

== Proposed restrictions on pride parades ==
In August 2023, city councilor Éder Borges (PP), introduced a bill proposing the prohibition of the participation of children and adolescents in LGBTQ events in Curitiba, including pride parades. The proposal was legally contested, with the City Council's legal department pointing out potential constitutional issues.

== Life conditions ==
=== Pride events ===
==== Curitiba Pride ====
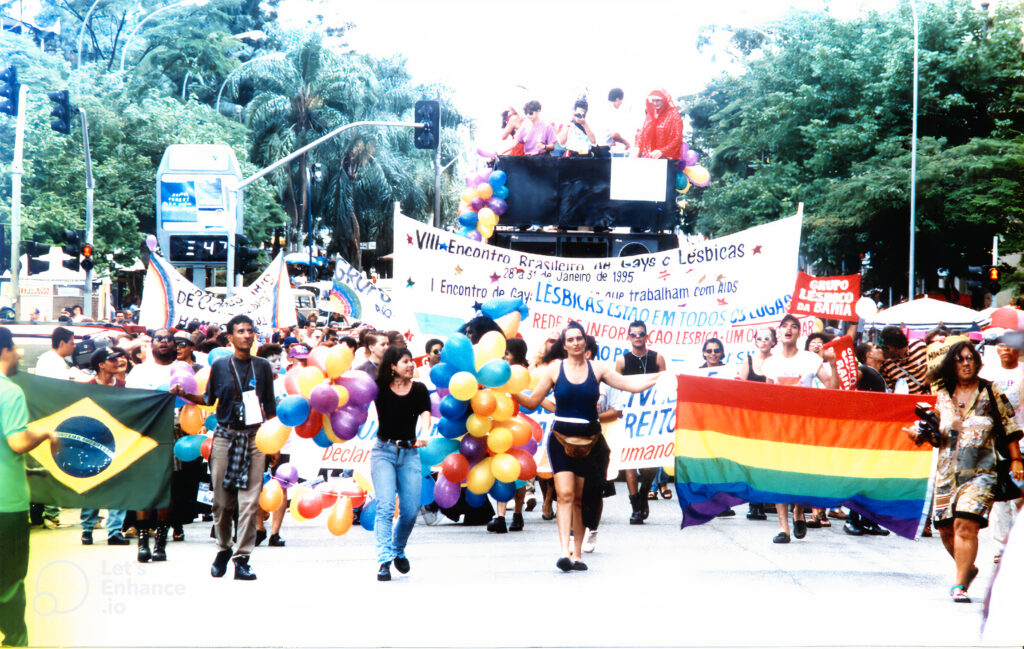
The first Curitiba Diversity Parade, 1995.

The Diversity Parade (Brazilian Portuguese: Parada da Diversidade) and the Diversity March (Brazilian Portuguese: Marcha pela Diversidade) of Curitiba are annual events held in the city, aimed at promoting the visibility of sexual and gender diversity. The events address themes related to the history, culture, and demands for rights of the LGBTQ population in Brazil. The event is often cited as one of the first LGBTQ pride parades held in Brazil. The events usually take place between 19 de Dezembro Square and Nossa Senhora de Salete Square, in front of the Legislative Assembly of Paraná.

In 2024, Legislative Assembly of Paraná received a law proposal, by Ana Júlia Ribeiro, to recognize Diversity Parade as Intangible Cultural Heritage; another was presented in 2025 by the Municipal Chamber of Curitiba.

== Summary table ==
Same-sex sexual activity legal	Yes (Since 1830)
Equal age of consent	Yes (Since 1830)
Anti-discrimination laws in employment only	Yes (Since 2019)
Anti-discrimination laws in the provision of goods and services	Yes (Since 2019)
Anti-discrimination laws in all other areas (Incl. indirect discrimination, hate speech)	Yes (Since 2019)
LGBTQ subjects free from censorship in education	Yes / No (Gender-neutral language banned statewide since 2023; "Gender ideology" banned in Arapongas since 2017)
Transgender people allowed to participate in the sport of their gender identity	Yes / No (Banned in Londrina since 2024; repeal pending)
Same-sex marriages	Yes (Since 2013)
Recognition of same-sex couples	Yes (Since 2011)
Stepchild adoption by same-sex couples	Yes (Officially permitted since 2010)
Joint adoption by same-sex couples	Yes (Officially permitted since 2010)
LGBTQ people allowed to serve openly in the military	Yes
Right to change legal gender	Yes (Since 2008; gender self-identification since 2018)
Third gender option	Yes (Since 2025)
Conversion therapy by medical professionals banned	Yes (Since 1999 for homosexuals and since 2018 for transgender people)
Access to IVF for lesbians	Yes (Since 2013)
Commercial surrogacy for gay male couples	No (Banned for any couple regardless of sexual orientation)
MSMs allowed to donate blood	Yes (Since 2020)
