= Centro Dom Bosco =

Catholic lay organization

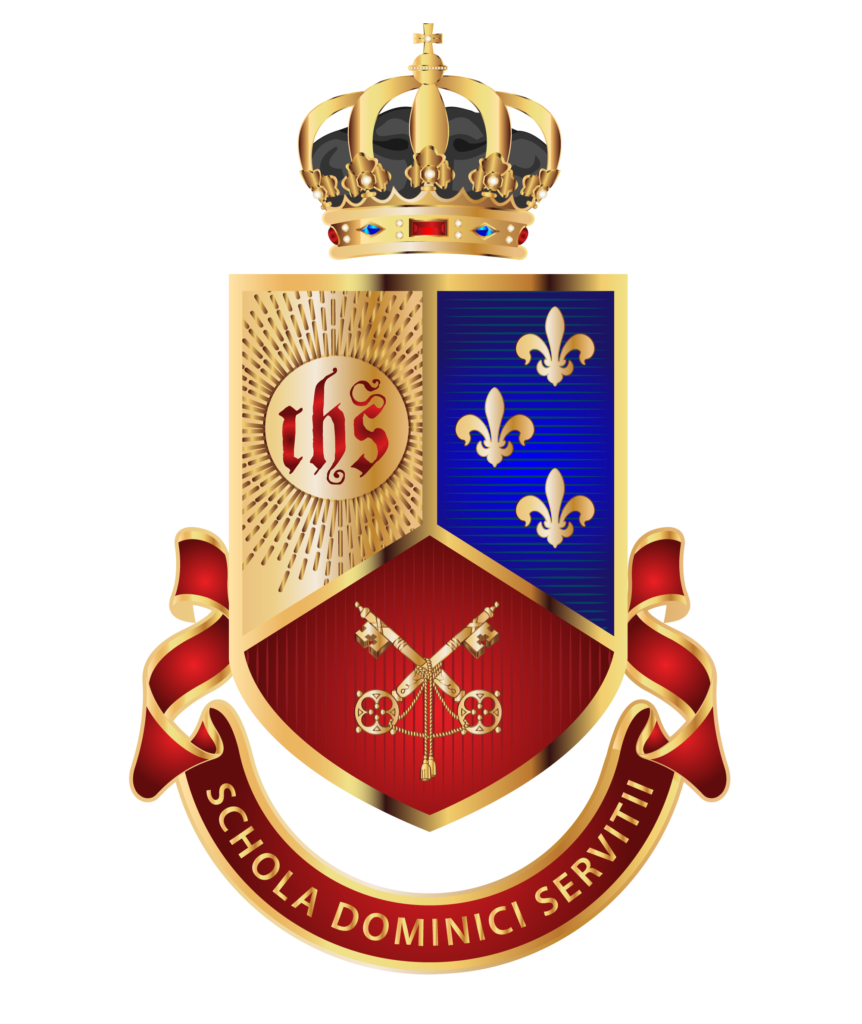
Shield of Centro Dom Bosco. Founded by a group of Catholic university students in 2016, Centro Dom Bosco quickly became an influential organization within Brazilian conservative circles

Centro Dom Bosco (Language: Portuguese. English: Don Bosco Centre) is a lay Catholic cultural center established on September 17, 2016, in Rio de Janeiro, Brazil. It is known for its support for Catholic traditionalist initiatives, rejection of the Second Vatican Council, promotion of the Tridentine Mass, as well as the controversies in which it has been involved. Despite identifying as Catholic, Centro Dom Bosco is not subject to the ecclesiastical hierarchy and has openly opposed it on many occasions, being a part of a phenomenon which some researchers label as "endogenous anticlericalism". According to researcher Victor Almeida Gama, the organization aims to revive Brazilian Catholic right-wing movements, such as TFP.

The group's declared aim is to "re-Christianize" Brazil, and is said to focus on forming a Catholic intellectual elite, educating leaders who would contribute to the establishment in Brazil of the Social Kingship of Christ — that is, a state where laws and institutions adhere to Catholic principles. Centro Dom Bosco has a YouTube channel covering topics pertaining to the Catholic doctrine from a pre-Second Vatican Council perspective, and also operates its own platform. Recently, the organization has expanded into film production and publishing through its own publishing house. Given its influence on virtual platforms and its broad reach among both clerical and lay circles, Centro Dom Bosco is recognized as one of the leading centers of Brazilian Catholic conservatism.

== Activities ==
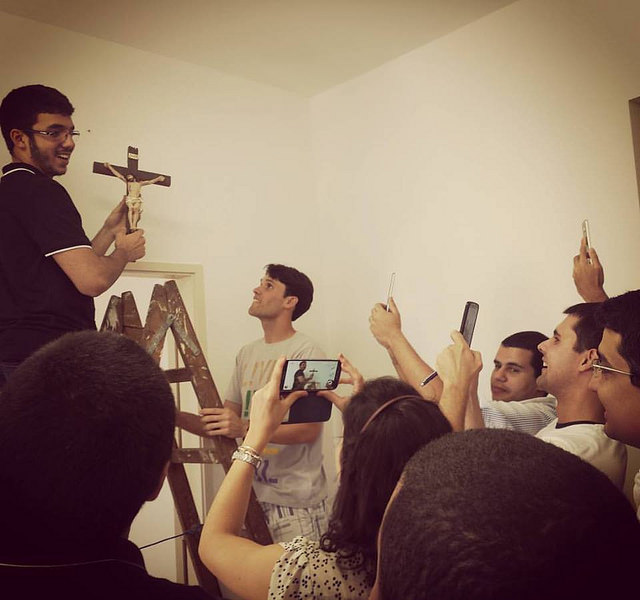
Founding conference held for Centro Dom Bosco

Established with the self-declared aim of "forming a new generation of Catholics capable of renewing the Church and the Land of the Holy Cross", under the motto "pray, study, and defend the faith," Centro Dom Bosco has become known for offering classes and courses on its digital platforms. These are available either for free on its YouTube channel or through a monthly donation of any amount on its own platform. The content of the classes invariably relates to pastoral and doctrinal practices predating the Second Vatican Council, including Latin, theology, and Gregorian chant. Because of that, the organization is often classified as part of the traditionalist movement.

In addition to its educational content, Centro Dom Bosco has also gained recognition for posting critic videos on its digital platforms, expressing their dissatisfaction with actions by clergy perceived as heretical, sacrilegious, or otherwise contrary to the Catholic faith. These videos have often reached a significant audience, in both support for the clergy targeted by the "accusations" and upholding Centro Dom Bosco's objections. Bishops and other priests targeted in these campaigns include Franciscan friar Lorrane Clementino, Dom Orlando Brandes, and the Episcopal Conference of Brazil (CNBB).

Similarly, Centro Dom Bosco has been actively involved in publishing since its early years. In 2018, they became known as the publishers of the controversial conservative newspaper O Universitário, widely distributed in front of colleges in Rio de Janeiro. On one occasion, a group of PUC-Rio students physically assaulted those delievering the newspaper, claiming its content was "transphobic" and "fascist". Footages of the altercation sparked widespread outcry on social media, leading the victims to pursue both civil and criminal legal actions against the students and professors involved. Centro Dom Bosco, whose editorial activity is self-described as its "primary counter-revolutionary front", has also become known for publishing classic Catholic titles translated directly from their original languages, as well as books about cultural warfare strategies by lesser-known authors, such as "Masonic Infiltrations in the Church," "How to Act in Counter-Revolutionary Warfare," and "Freemasonry: Enemy of the Church." By 2022, Centro Dom Bosco had published 40 titles.

== Positions ==
Centro Dom Bosco affirms its adherence to the traditional Magisterium of the Catholic faith. Although they do not consider themselves to be sedevacantists, they often criticize the Second Vatican Council and the alleged infiltration of the ecclesial hierarchy by "revolutionary extreme left". Their media channels frequently express support for the Tridentine Mass, which they refer to as the "everlasting mass", in opposition to the ordinary form established by Pope Paul VI. The group also espouses a deeply anti-communist stance, opposing the progressive Marxist wing they believe has infiltrated the Church, represented by priests supportive of liberation theology.

Furthermore, the organization is diametrically opposed to any form of voluntary abortion, even in those cases allowed by Brazilian law, often exerting pressure on elected representatives to advocate for their interests on this issue. In accordance with Catholic doctrine, they oppose Freemasonry, having released a series of five critical videos to the organization on their YouTube channel. Other topics they oppose include secularism, Protestantism, leftism, Marxism, socialism, globalism, feminism, and so-called "gender theory".

Some researchers argue that Olavo de Carvalho's thought has deeply influenced Centro Dom Bosco's modus operandi, including Carlos Nougué, who was once involved with the organization in its early years. The group's connection to "olavism" could be seen not only in their adherence to the concept of cultural war but also through their network of relationships with figures close to Olavo, such as Bernardo Küster and Ítalo Marsili. However, the group has never commented on whether or to what extent Olavo's philosophy serves as a theoretical basis for their actions.

== Christ the King League ==
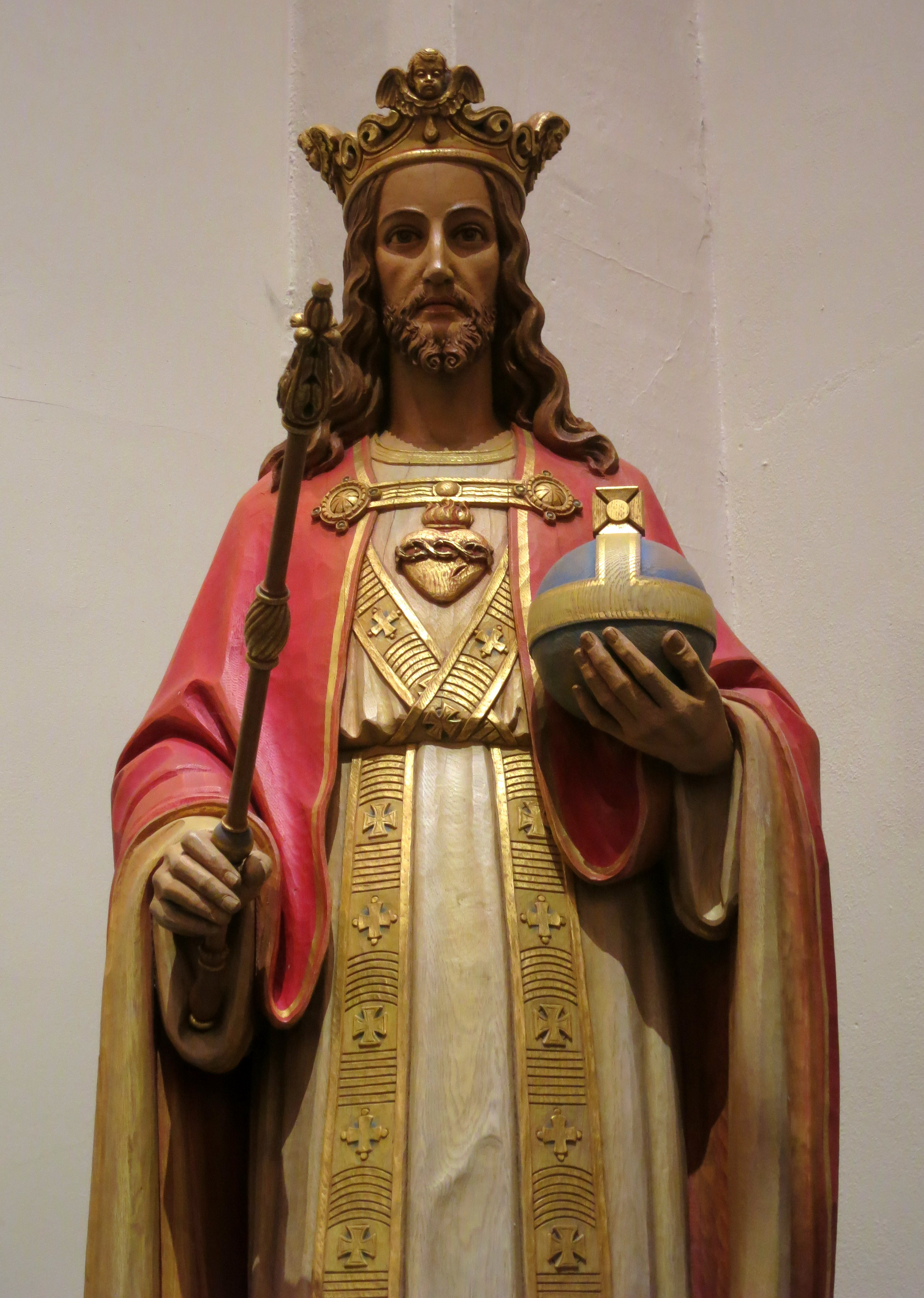
Devotional image of Christ the King venerated at the Cathedral of the Immaculate Conception in Peoria, Illinois. The Cristero cry "Que Viva Cristo Rey" is pointed out as Centro Dom Bosco slogan and "Christ the King" designates the league of Catholic lay centers led by the group.

In addition to offering courses related to the Catholic faith, editorial publication, and audiovisual production, Centro Dom Bosco also engages in spreading its organizational model, providing resources for those interested in establishing lay Catholic centers for leadership formation. By 2016, after successfully intermediating the opening of centers in a number of capitals, the group organized the Christ the King League (Portuguese: Liga Cristo Rei), bringing together newly founded centers for mutual support and training, and envisioning periodic forums for idea exchange.

The first forum of the Christ the King League took place in 2017, gathering nationally affiliated groups. These meetings soon became a focal point for a significant number of influencers within the Catholic right, such as Ernesto Araújo, Bertrand of Orléans-Braganza, and Cardinal Athanasius Schneider, a priest critical of Pope Francis's pontificate. With an increase in the number of associated Catholic centers, regional and state forums were established, meeting annually.

Affiliated centers of the Christ the King League often mimic the combative tone of cultural warfare by which Centro Dom Bosco is known, using virtual activism or other methods against actions they perceive as contrary to Catholic faith or Christian values. Recently, members of Confraria Dom Vital, a group based in Recife and affiliated with the league, commissioned paid advertisements on buses and shared videos on social media criticizing the 2024 edition of the Fraternity Campaign promoted by Episcopal Conference of Brazil (CNBB). They instructed the faithful not to donate to CNBB's national fund; instead, they recommended Catholics to prioritize Lenten practices, such as fasting, prayer, and almsgiving. This initiative, viewed by many as a direct attack on Archbishop Paulo Jackson Nóbrega de Sousa of Olinda and Recife, was condemned by regional representatives of CNBB, which criticized the group as being guided by "shallow, aggressive, inconsistent, and ultraconservative" ideologies. The event also drew condemnation by the Recife City Council and the State Legislative Assembly of Pernambuco.

== Controversies ==
Centro Dom Bosco gained national prominence in 2018 when it filed a lawsuit to prevent the group Catholics for Choice from self-identifying as "Catholic," arguing that their advocacy for the legalization of abortion in Brazil was contrary to the doctrine of the faith they claimed to belong to. The group obtained a favorable injunction at first instance, which was later overturned on appeal.

The group also became known for attempting to prohibit, in 2018, the reproduction of comedy sketches by the group Porta dos Fundos, arguing that this production company was "mocking the Catholic faith." In 2019, the group returned to court, this time seeking the removal of Porta dos Fundos' Christmas special, which depicted Jesus Christ in a manner conflicting with Catholic imagery. The removal attempt garnered media attention, resulting in a favorable ruling at first instance, leading to the series episode being removed from Netflix's catalog. The organization was eventually fined R$ 10,000.00 for bad faith litigation, as the judiciary found their claim to be blatantly contrary to the Brazilian Constitution, which prohibits censorship of cultural and artistic expressions.

In 2022, the group expressed support for then-President Jair Bolsonaro, describing him at the time as "a lesser evil that a faithful Catholic should never consider as good." In support for the candidate, Dom Bosco Center organized a public rosary against communism on October 12, 2022, the feast day of Our Lady of Aparecida, in front of the Old Basilica of Aparecida, an event Bolsonaro stated he would attend. However, the rosary did not take place as planned, as the parish priest of the Old Basilica rang the church bells for about an hour during the scheduled time, and the president did not appear, although he was in Aparecida at the time of the religious event. Later, during a mass at the Basilica of Our Lady of Aparecida, the priest who interrupted the rosary criticized those who instrumentalize religion for political ends without mentioning the incident or referring to the Dom Bosco Center, stating that the day of the patron saint is not a day to ask for votes, but to seek blessings.

Public recitation of the rosary in support the organization's agenda is a recurring practice that has sometimes put them at odds with the Catholic hierarchy. In 2017, the group organized a rosary in reparation for an Afro-rite mass traditionally celebrated at the Church of the Sacred Heart of Jesus on the occasion of Black Awareness Day, claiming that the celebration was sacrilegious and contrary to the rubrics in force for the Roman Rite of the Catholic Church. The rosary, recited loudly inside the church during the mass, caused uproar among some of the faithful present, and the police were called to quell the disturbance, resulting in the indictment of five individuals associated with the center for religious intolerance. In the year following, the Afro-rite mass was revoked by the Archbishop of Rio de Janeiro following the group's request and has not been celebrated since.

=== Opposition to CNBB's Fraternity Campaign ===
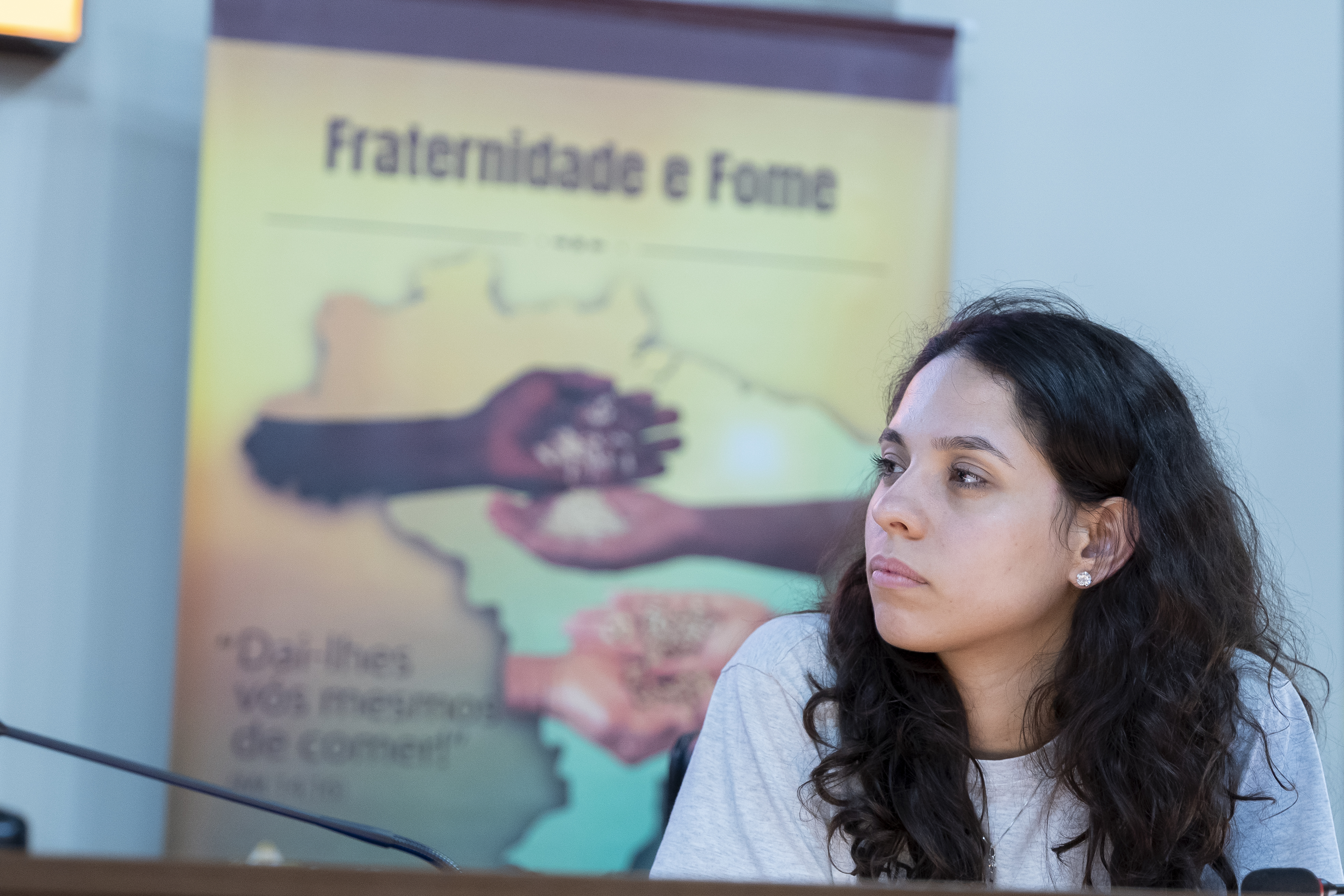
Centro Dom Bosco has systematically opposed the themes chosen for CNBB Fraternity Campaign, notably the 2021 and 2023 edition. In the picture, a photo taken from the Solemn Session of the Paraná State Legislative Assembly shows State Representative Ana Júlia Ribeiro in the foreground, with the official poster of the 2023 Fraternity Campaign in the background.

Since its foundation, Centro Dom Bosco has consistently expressed dissatisfaction with the themes proposed for the Fraternity Campaign, arguing that the language used in the annual campaign's basic texts contradicts Catholic doctrine. They encourage believers not to donate to the National Fraternity Collection, and to emphasize fasting, prayer, and almsgiving during Lent.

In 2021, when the Episcopal Conference of Brazil (CNBB) planned the Ecumenical Fraternity Campaign, the group used its digital media platforms to criticize what they claimed to be the promotion of gender ideology on the campaign's documents, as well as the involvement of Protestant groups, whom they labeled as "heretics". This time, calls to boycott the Fraternity Campaign garnered support from several members of the Catholic clergy, and at least two bishops instructed priests under their jurisdiction not to participate in the event.

Two years later, in 2023, the group once again voiced opposition to the theme chosen, pointing it as some sort of covert criticism of Jair Messias Bolsonaro's government. They warned the CNBB not to support agendas favored by communist governments or endorse such candidates. Despite receiving support from many Catholic digital influencers, the boycott that year did not resonate with the clergy, who largely embraced the theme proposed by the CNBB.

== Famous members and ex-members ==
- Bernardo Küster: YouTuber and Catholic influencer.
- Carlos Nougué: writer and philosopher.
- Cássia Kis: actress.
- Chris Tonietto: Federal Representative of Rio de Janeiro.
- Márcio Gualberto: State Representative of Rio de Janeiro.

== Bibliography ==
- Ambroziak, R. S. (2023). "Múltiplos olhares sobre o papel atual das religiões no campo político global". Antropolítica - Revista Contemporânea de Antropologia (in Portuguese). 55. Niteroi, Brazil. doi:10.22409/antropolitica.i.a58795.
- Bencke, R. M. (2021). "Sobre o que precisamos conversar pelo caminho? Campanha da Fraternidade Ecumênica em tempos de fundamentalismos: aprendizados e desafios para o movimento ecumênico". Caminhos de Diálogo (in Portuguese). 14 (9). Curitiba, Brazil: 47–57. doi:10.7213/cd.a9n14p47-57. ISSN 2595-8208.
- Carranza, B. (2023). "Ultraconservadorismo católico: Mimeses dos mecanismos da erosão democrática brasileira". Lua Nova (in Portuguese). 119. São Paulo, Brazil. doi:10.1590/0102-048075/119.
- Fernandes da Silva, R. (2021). "CFE-2021: Conflito de visões antagônica" [CFE-2021: Conflict of antagonistic views]. V CONACIR: Religião e Alteridade. Programa de Pós-Graduação em Ciência da Religião da UFJF. (in Portuguese). Juiz de Fora, Brazil.
- Farias, A. F. (2021). "Associação Centro Dom Bosco de Fé e Cultura versus Porta dos Fundos e Netflix: Direito na arte e na colisão de direitos fundamentais". Revista de Direito, Arte e LiteraturaRevista (in Portuguese). 7. Online. ISSN 2525-9911.
- Fernandes da Silva, R. (2021). "CFE-2021: Conflito de visões antagônica" [CFE-2021: Conflict of antagonistic views]. V CONACIR: Religião e Alteridade. Programa de Pós-Graduação em Ciência da Religião da UFJF. (in Portuguese). Juiz de Fora, Brazil.
- Gama, V. A. (2021). "O Centro Dom Bosco e a atuação da nova direita católica" (PDF). ANPUH-BRASIL - 31º Simpósio Nacional de História (in Portuguese). Rio de Janeiro, Brazil.
- Lima, P. H. B. (2021). A vocação anticristã do Centro Dom Bosco (1st ed.). Belo Horizonte: Edições Independentes. ISBN 978-65-00-24474-8.
- Nougué, C. (2020). Opúsculos Tomistas II (1st ed.). Edições Santo Tomás II. ISBN 9788568860038.
- Nunes, M. J. R.; Bandeira, O.; Pereira, G. C. (2021). "A quem pertence o termo "católicas"? Direito e mídia como arenas e estratégias do neoconservadorismo". PLURAL, Revista do Programa de Pós -Graduação em Sociologia da USP (in Portuguese). 28.1. doi:10.11606/issn.2176-8099.pcso.2021.185324.
- Oliveira, G. G. (2022). "Malditos os que têm Fome e Sede de Justiça: discursos cristãos neoconservadores e lógicas neoliberais na educação brasileira". Currículo sem fronteiras (in Portuguese). 22. doi:10.35786/1645-1384.v22.1155.
- Sbardelotto, M. A. (2023). "Facetas midiático-digitais do neorreacionarismo católico no Brasil". Reflexão: Revista de Pós-graduação em Ciências da Religião, Centro de Ciências Humanas e Sociais Aplicadas da PUC Campinas (in Portuguese). 48. Campinas, Brazil. doi:10.24220/2447-6803v48e2023a8864.
- Silva, E. (2020). Um Papa em rede: Francisco e as redes sociais (PhD thesis) (in Portuguese). Universidade Federal do Rio de Janeiro, Joinville Campus.
- Souza, N. (2022). "O avanço do fundamentalismo católico nas redes sociais no Brasil". Revista de Cultura Teológica (in Portuguese). 102 (XXX). São Paulo, Brazil. doi:10.24220/2447-6803v48e2023a8864. ISSN 2317-4307.
- Wink, G. (2023). "Le nouvel intégrisme : les conservateurs catholiques et la Nouvelle Droite brésilienne". Brésil(s). Sciences humaines et sociales (in French). 23. doi:10.4000/bresils.14876. Archived from the original on 2024-05-14.
