= Fraternity Campaign =

Annual event/campaign in Brazil

Fraternity Campaign Campanha da Fraternidade
- Official poster for the 2026 Fraternity Campaign, featuring Timothy Schmalz's sculpture Homeless Jesus
- Status: Ongoing
- Begins: December 20, 1964
- Country: Brazil
- Inaugurated: December 20, 1964

The Fraternity Campaign (in Portuguese: Campanha da Fraternidade) is an annual Lenten initiative of the Catholic Church in Brazil, organized by the National Conference of Bishops of Brazil (CNBB). Every five years, it is conducted ecumenically in partnership with other Christian denominations. Its primary objective is to raise awareness and foster solidarity among the faithful and society at large regarding a specific social issue affecting Brazil, while seeking pathways toward solutions. Each year, a theme is selected to define the concrete reality to be addressed, accompanied by a motto that outlines the desired direction for transformation.

The Campaign aims to educate for a life of fraternity, grounded in justice and love as central Gospel principles, and to renew collective responsibility for the Church's evangelizing and human promotion mission toward a just and supportive society. A tangible expression of the Campaign is the solidarity collection held on Palm Sunday, implemented nationwide across Catholic and ecumenical Christian communities. The funds raised constitute the National Solidarity Fund and Diocesan Solidarity Funds; 60% is allocated to social projects within the donating diocese, while the remaining 40% forms the National Fund, which strengthens solidarity initiatives across different regions of the country.

== History ==
In 1961, three priests responsible for Caritas Brazil conceived a campaign to raise funds for charitable activities. This initiative, named the Fraternity Campaign, was first held during Lent in 1962 in Natal, Rio Grande do Norte. The following year, it was adopted by sixteen dioceses in the Northeast. While not financially successful, this initial effort became the embryo of an annual project for the National Organizations of the CNBB and the Particular Churches in Brazil, conducted in light of the General Guidelines for the Pastoral (Evangelizing) Action of the Church in the country.

The campaign's early development was significantly influenced by the National Secretariat for Social Action of the CNBB, under which Caritas Brazil, founded in 1957, operated. At the time, the Secretariat was headed by Bishop Eugênio de Araújo Sales, who also served as President of Caritas Brazil. His role as the Apostolic Administrator of Natal explains why the campaign was first launched in that ecclesiastical jurisdiction and throughout the state of Rio Grande do Norte.

Launched nationally on December 26, 1962, under the renewing spirit of the Second Vatican Council, the campaign was first held across Brazil during Lent in 1964. The council period was fundamental for conceiving and structuring the Fraternity Campaign, alongside the Emergency Pastoral Plan and the Joint Pastoral Plan, ultimately contributing to the launch of Organic Pastoral work and other initiatives of ecclesial renewal. Over four consecutive years, during extended periods, Brazilian bishops residing together in Rome while attending Council sessions engaged in meetings, study, and exchange of experiences, which provided the fertile context for the campaign's birth and growth.

On December 20, 1964, the bishops approved the campaign's foundational document. In 1965, both Caritas and the Fraternity Campaign were transferred from the National Secretariat for Social Action to be directly linked to the CNBB's General Secretariat, marking the CNBB's full assumption of the campaign. This transition established its basic structure. By 1967, the preparation of more comprehensive annual planning materials began, and national meetings for its coordination were initiated. From 1971, the CNBB Presidency and the Episcopal Pastoral Commission also participated in these meetings. A significant milestone was reached in 1970 when the pope began delivering a message for its launch on Ash Wednesday, a practice that continues to enrich the campaign's opening.

From 1962 to the present, the Fraternity Campaign has been a broad evangelization activity developed during Lent. It aims to help Christians and people of good will live out fraternity through concrete commitments, transforming society by addressing a specific problem that requires everyone's participation in its solution. It has become a distinctive expression of liberating evangelization, simultaneously fostering the renewal of the Church's life and the transformation of society. The 2023 campaign, under the motto "Give them something to eat yourselves," faced criticism from conservative Catholic groups, such as the Centro Dom Bosco, which alleged communist influences in its foundational text.

== Campaigns ==
In the history of the Fraternity Campaign's development, several phases can be identified, which also intertwine with the history of the Catholic Church and the recent history of Brazilian society.

=== 1st Phase: In Search of the Church's Internal Renewal ===
==== Renewal of the Church ====
Year	Theme	Motto	Ref.
1964	Church in Renewal	Remember: You are also the Church	
1965	Parish in Renewal	Make your parish a community of faith, worship, and love	

==== Renewal of the Christian ====
Year	Theme	Motto	Ref.
1966	Fraternity	We are responsible for each other	
1967	Co-responsibility	We are all equal, we are all brothers	
1968	Donation	Believe with your hands!	
1969	Fraternity	For the other person, you're next	
1970	Participation	To be a Christian is to participate	
1971	Reconciliation	Reconcile	
1972	Service and Vocation	Discover the joy of serving	

=== 2nd Phase: The Church is concerned with the social reality of the people, denouncing social sin and promoting justice ===
Year	Theme	Motto	Ref.
1973	Fraternity and Liberation	Selfishness enslaves, love liberates	
1974	Rebuilding Life	Where is your brother?	
1975	Fraternity is Sharing	Share the Bread	
1976	Fraternity and Community	Walk Together	
1977	Fraternity in the Family	Start in Your Home	
1978	Fraternity in the World of Work	Work and Justice for All	
1979	For a More Humane World	Preserve What Belongs to Everyone	
1980	Fraternity in the World of Migrations	Where Are You Going?	
1981	Health and Fraternity	Health for All	
1982	Education and Fraternity	The Truth Shall Set You Free	
1983	Fraternity and Violence	Fraternity Yes, Violence No	
1984	Fraternity and Life	So That All May Have Life	

=== 3rd Phase: The Church turns to the existential situations of the Brazilian people ===
Year	Theme	Motto	Ref.
1985	Fraternity and Hunger	Bread for Those Who Are Hungry	
1986	Fraternity and Land	God's Land, Land of Brothers	
1987	Fraternity and the Minor	Whoever Welcomes the Minor, Welcomes Me	
1988	Fraternity and the Black Person	Hear the Cry of This People!	
1989	Fraternity and Communication	Communication for Truth and Peace	
1990	Fraternity and Women	Woman and Man: Image of God	
1991	Fraternity and the World of Work	United in the Dignity of Work	
1992	Fraternity and Youth	Youth – An Open Path	
1993	Fraternity and Housing	Where Do You Live?	
1994	Fraternity and the Family	Family, How Are You?	
1995	Fraternity and the Excluded	Was It You, Lord?!	
1996	Fraternity and Politics	Justice and Peace Shall Embrace!	
1997	Fraternity and the Imprisoned	Christ Frees from All Prisons	
1998	Fraternity and Education	At the Service of Life and Hope	
1999	Fraternity and the Unemployed	Without Work... Why?	
2000	Human Dignity and Peace (Ecumenical)	New Millennium Without Exclusions	
2001	Fraternity and Drugs	Life Yes, Drugs No!	
2002	Fraternity and Indigenous Peoples	For a Land Without Evils	
2003	Fraternity and Elderly People	Life, Dignity, and Hope	
2004	Fraternity and Water	Water, Source of Life	
2005	Solidarity and Peace (Ecumenical)	"Blessed are the peacemakers" (Mt 5:9)	
2006	Fraternity and Persons with Disabilities	"Stand up, come into the middle!" (Mk 3:3)	
2007	Fraternity and the Amazon	Life and Mission on This Land	
2008	Fraternity and Defense of Life	"Therefore choose life" (Dt 30:19)	
2009	Fraternity and Public Security	"Peace is the fruit of justice" (Is 32:17)	
2010	Economy and Life (Ecumenical)	"You cannot serve both God and money" (Mt 6:24)	
2011	Fraternity and Life on the Planet	"The creation groans in labor pains" (Rom 8:22)	
2012	Fraternity and Public Health	"Let health spread over the earth!" (cf. Sir 38:8)	
2013	Fraternity and Youth	"Here I am, send me!" (Is 6:8)	
2014	Fraternity and Human Trafficking	"It is for freedom that Christ has set us free" (Gal 5:1)	
2015	Fraternity: Church and Society	"I came to serve" (Mk 10:45)	
2016	Common Home, Our Responsibility (Ecumenical)	"Let justice roll on like a river, righteousness like a never-failing stream!" (Amos 5:24)	
2017	Fraternity: Brazilian Biomes and Defense of Life	"Cultivate and care for creation" (Gen 2:15)	
2018	Fraternity and Overcoming Violence	"You are all brothers" (Mt 23:8)	
2019	Fraternity and Public Policies	"You will be redeemed by justice and right" (Is 1:27)	
2020	Fraternity and Life: Gift and Commitment	"He saw him, took pity, and cared for him" (cf. Lk 10:33-34)	
2021	Fraternity and Dialogue: Commitment of Love (Ecumenical)	"Christ is our peace. He made the two groups one." (Eph 2:14)	
2022	Fraternity and Education	"Speak with wisdom, teach with love." (cf. Pr 31:26)	
2023	Fraternity and Hunger	“You give them something to eat” (Mt 14:16)	
2024	Fraternity and Social Friendship	"You are all brothers and sisters" (Mt 23:8)	
2025	Fraternity and Integral Ecology	"God saw all that he had made, and it was very good!" (Gen 1:31)	
2026	Fraternity and Housing	"And he made his dwelling among us!" (Jn 1:14)	

== See also ==
- Catholic Church in Brazil
- Social issues in Brazil
