= Ana Júlia Ribeiro =

Brazilian politician (born 2000)

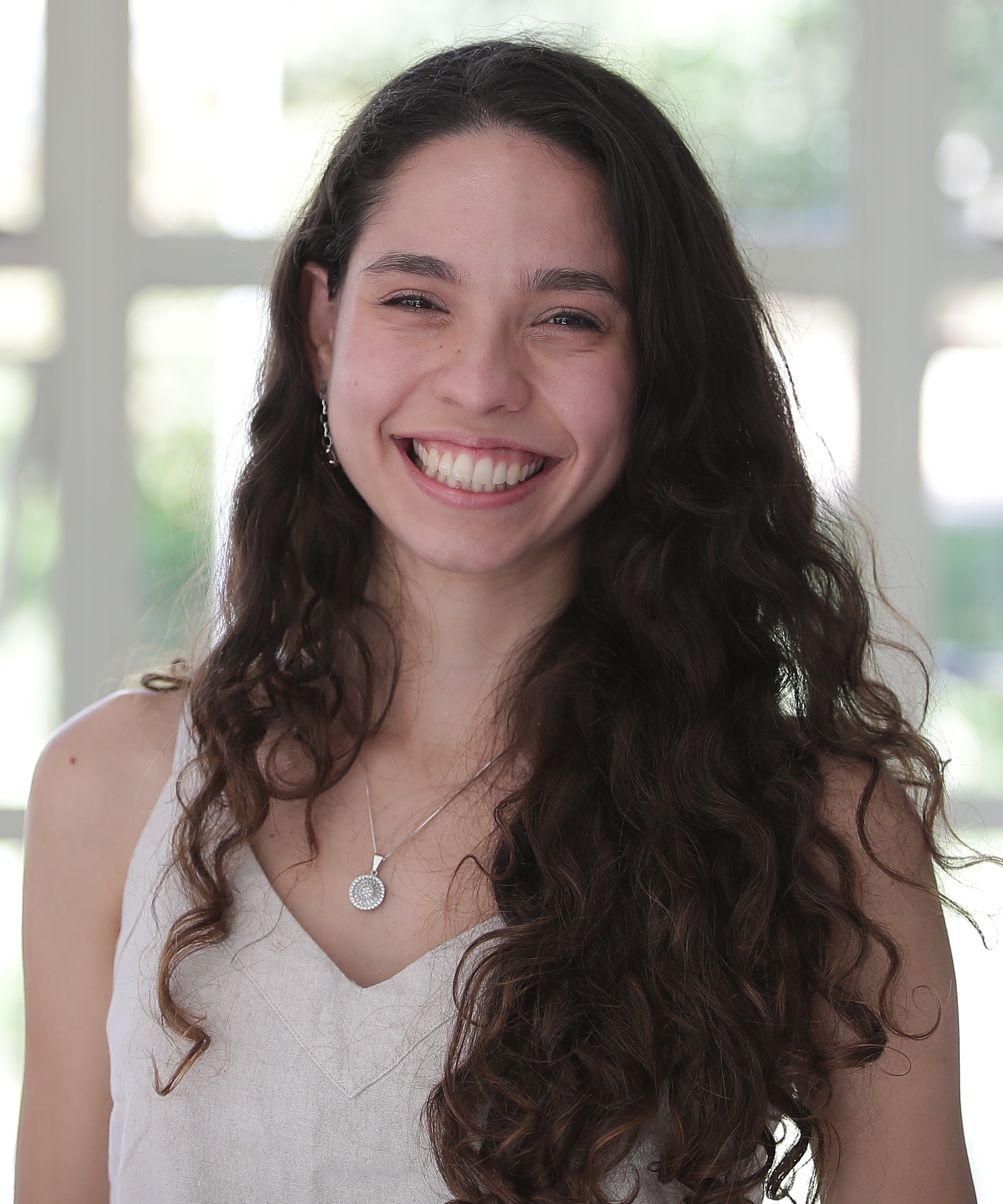
- Ribeiro in 2022

Member of the Legislative Assembly of Paraná
- Incumbent
- Assumed office 1 February 2023

Personal details
- Born: 30 June 2000 (age 26)
- Party: Workers' Party (since 2018)

Ana Júlia Pires Ribeiro (born 30 June 2000) is a Brazilian politician serving as a member of the Legislative Assembly of Paraná since 2023. In 2022, she was a member of the Municipal Chamber of Curitiba.

== Biography ==
Ana Júlia began her activism in the student movement, standing out in the secondary school mobilizations of 2016, organized by students who opposed the reform of secondary education. She became nationally known for her speech at the Legislative Assembly of Paraná, when at age 16 she confronted the deputies defending the secondary school occupation movement. Ana Júlia is currently studying Law at the Pontifical Catholic University of Paraná (PUCPR), in addition to studying Philosophy at the Federal University of Paraná (UFPR).

She joined the Workers' Party (PT) in 2018, at the invitation of former President Lula, and in 2020, she ran for the Municipal Chamber of Curitiba. She received 4,538 votes, becoming the party's first alternate. She served as a city councilor on two occasions. Ana Júlia replaced Renato Freitas (PT) on both occasions when the councilor was removed from office due to the revocation of his parliamentary mandate by the CMC, whose effects were suspended by the Supreme Federal Court.

Also in 2022, she was elected state representative with over 51,000 votes, becoming the youngest parliamentarian in the history of Legislative Assembly of Paraná.

In 2024, she was one of the 13 parliamentarians who voted against Governor Ratinho Júnior's bill to privatize the management of public schools in Paraná.
