= Márcio Gualberto =

Brazilian politician

State Deputy from Rio de Janeiro
- Incumbent
- Assumed office 1 February 2019

Personal details
- Born: Márcio Gualberto dos Santos; 15 November 1976 (age 49) Recife, Pernambuco, Brazil
- Party: DC (2013-2018); PSL (2018-2022); UNIÃO (2022); Liberal Party (2022–present)
- Occupation: Police Investigator

Márcio Gualberto dos Santos (November 15, 1976) is an inspector of the Civil Police and Brazilian state deputy member of the Liberal Party from Rio de Janeiro. In the elections of 2018, Gualberto was elected deputy with 23,169 votes, with his expense of 3,288.98 reais, setting the best relation between number of votes and campaign expenses, with 14 cents per voter.

In December 2021, he presented Bill 4.919/21, together with deputy Filipe Soares (DEM) "which prohibits discrimination against people who refuse to take the vaccine against the COVID-19 vaccine." In practice, the project would put end to the so-called "Vaccine Passport", that is, the requirement to present proof of vaccination for entering and staying in closed places, required in Rio de Janeiro due to the COVID-19 pandemic. The project was discussed in plenary on May 3, 2022, but was barred due to lack of quorum.

In the 2022 elections, he was re-elected state deputy, this time by the Liberal Party, with 51,856 votes.

== Personal life ==
Gualberto is Roman Catholic, married with four children. Due to his faith he is against abortion.

Like the elected federal deputy Chris Tonietto, he is connected to the Centro Dom Bosco.

== Electoral history ==
Year	Election	Party	Coalition	Candidate for	Votes	Result	Ref
2014	2014 Rio de Janeiro gubernatorial election	PSDC	United for the Family (PSDC and PMN)	State Deputy	3,113	Not Elected	
2016	2016 Rio de Janeiro mayoral election	PSDC	None	Councilor	2,023	Not Elected	
2018	2018 Rio de Janeiro gubernatorial election	PSL	None	State Deputy	23,169	Elected	
2022	2022 Rio de Janeiro gubernatorial election	PL	None	State Deputy	51,856	Elected	
