= Gualberto Vega =

Gualberto Vega Yapura (died July 17, 1980, La Paz) was a Bolivian trade unionist. Vega Yapura was the head of the FSTMB miners' union.

Vega Yapura was shot down and killed by paramilitary forces, as they attacked the Central Obrera Boliviana office on the morning of the July 17, 1980 coup d'état of Luis García Meza.

In 2010, the Bolivian Supreme Court of Justice ordered the armed forces to presents in daily logs for the period of June 1979 to December 1980. Amongst other issues, the Court hoped that the documents (if revealed) would indicate the location of Vega Yapura's remains and information on who had ordered that attack on the Central Obrera Boliviana office in 1980. On July 17, 2010, Bolivian president Evo Morales honoured Vega Yapura and other victims of the July 17, 1980 massacre at a ceremony in the Palacio Quemado. At the same function, Vega Yapura's widow Isabel Mena urged Morales to bring the perpetrators of killings of the military regimes to justice.
