= Chris Tonietto =

Brazilian lawyer and politician

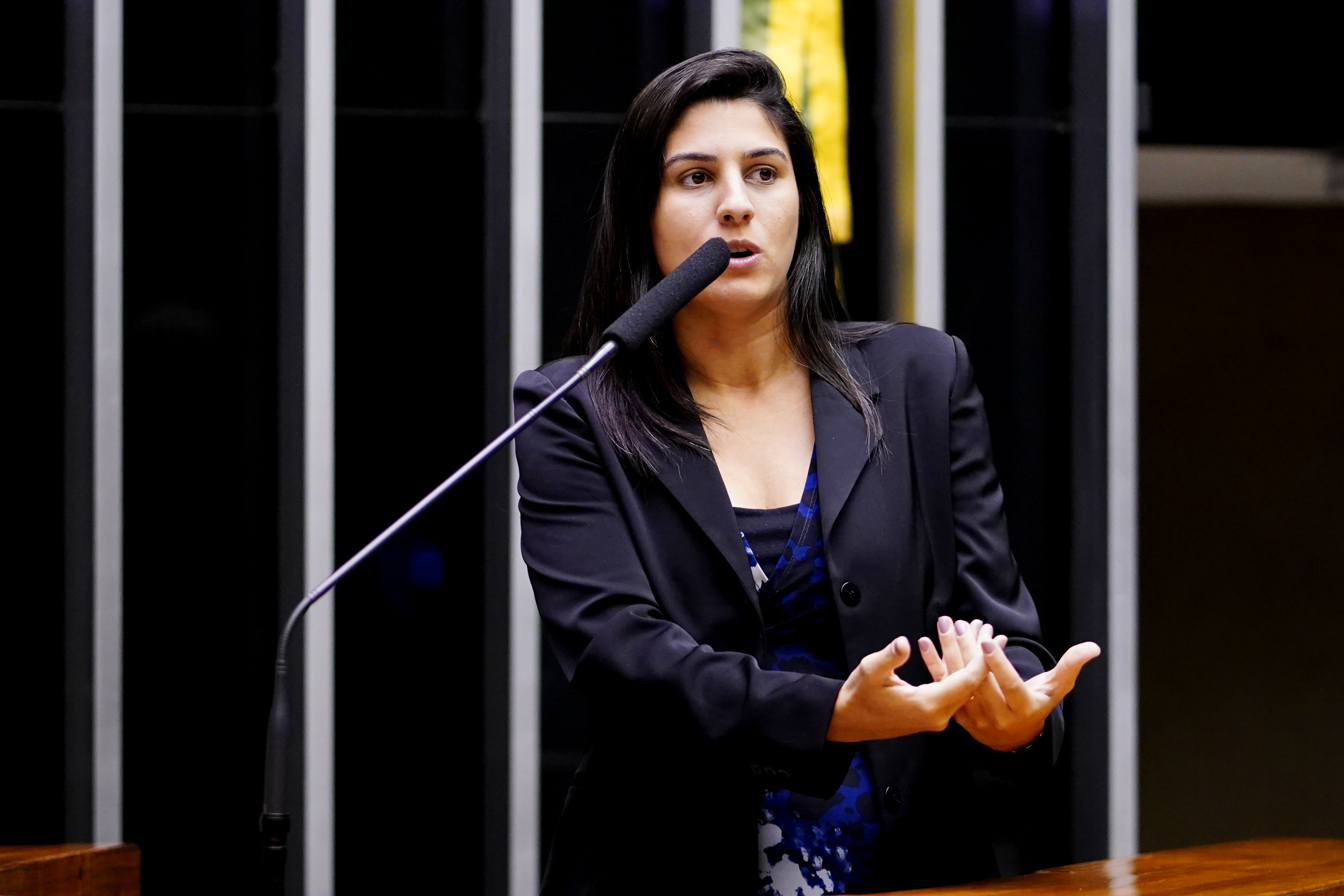

Member of the Chamber of Deputies
- In office 1 February 2019
- Constituency: Rio de Janeiro

Personal details
- Born: Christine Nogueira dos Reis; 14 May 1991 (age 35) Rio de Janeiro, Brazil
- Party: PL (2022–present)
- Other political affiliations: PSL (2018–2022); UNIÃO (2022)
- Education: Fluminense Federal University
- Profession: Lawyer

Christine Nogueira do Reis Tonietto (née Nogueira dos Reis, born 14 May 1991), better known as Chris Tonietto, is a Brazilian lawyer and politician affiliated with the Liberal Party (PL) and currently a federal deputy for Rio de Janeiro.

== Biography ==
Christine Nogueira dos Reis was born in Rio de Janeiro on 14 May 1991 and graduated in law from Fluminense Federal University (UFF) in 2016.

As a Roman Catholic lawyer and a member of the cultural center Centro Dom Bosco, in 2017 she staged an action against the humorous Porta dos Fundos, by virtue of its video parodying the sky in Catholicism. The process was extinguished without examination of the merits in the following year, due to the lack of payment of procedural costs.

In the elections of 7 October 2018, Tonietto was elected federal deputy of the Social Liberal Party by the Rio de Janeiro for the 56th Legislature of the National Congress with 38,129 votes (0.50% of the valid votes). She was re-elected for a second term in 2022 with 52,583 votes (0.61% of valid votes).

=== Personal life ===
She is married and has a child.

== Political Positions ==
=== Abortion ===
Tonietto opposes abortion in all cases.

=== Gender and sexual minorities ===
On June 12, 2020, Chris Tonietto posted on Facebook: "Pedophilia relates more specifically to the so-called 'gender theory' and its application in school settings. Explicitly defended by some exponents of the LGBT movement, pedophilia is visibly entering the country as a factor in the dissolution of trust in family relationships and moral corruption of an entire generation of children exposed to an abominable eroticization from their earliest childhood."

== Electoral history ==
Year	Election	Party	Office	Votes	%	Result	Ref
2018	2018 Rio de Janeiro gubernatorial election	PSL	Federal Deputy	38,525	0,50%	Elected	
2022	2022 Rio de Janeiro gubernatorial election	PL	Federal Deputy	52,583	0,61%	Elected	
