= São José do Hortêncio =

Municipality of Rio Grande do Sul, Brazil

- Municipality
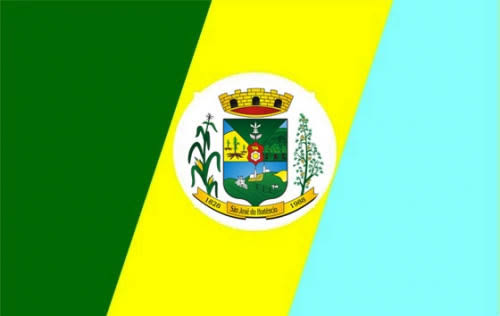
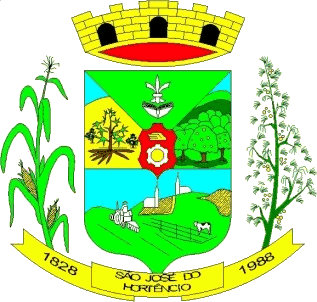
- Flag Coat of arms

- Location within Rio Grande do Sul

- Location in Brazil
- Coordinates: 29°32′S 51°16′W
- Country: Brazil
- State: Rio Grande do Sul
- Time zone: UTC-3 (BRT)
  - Summer (DST): UTC-2 (BRST)

São José do Hortêncio is a municipality in the state of Rio Grande do Sul, Brazil.

== See also ==
- List of municipalities in Rio Grande do Sul
