= 2016 student protests in Brazil =

Series of demonstrations and occupations

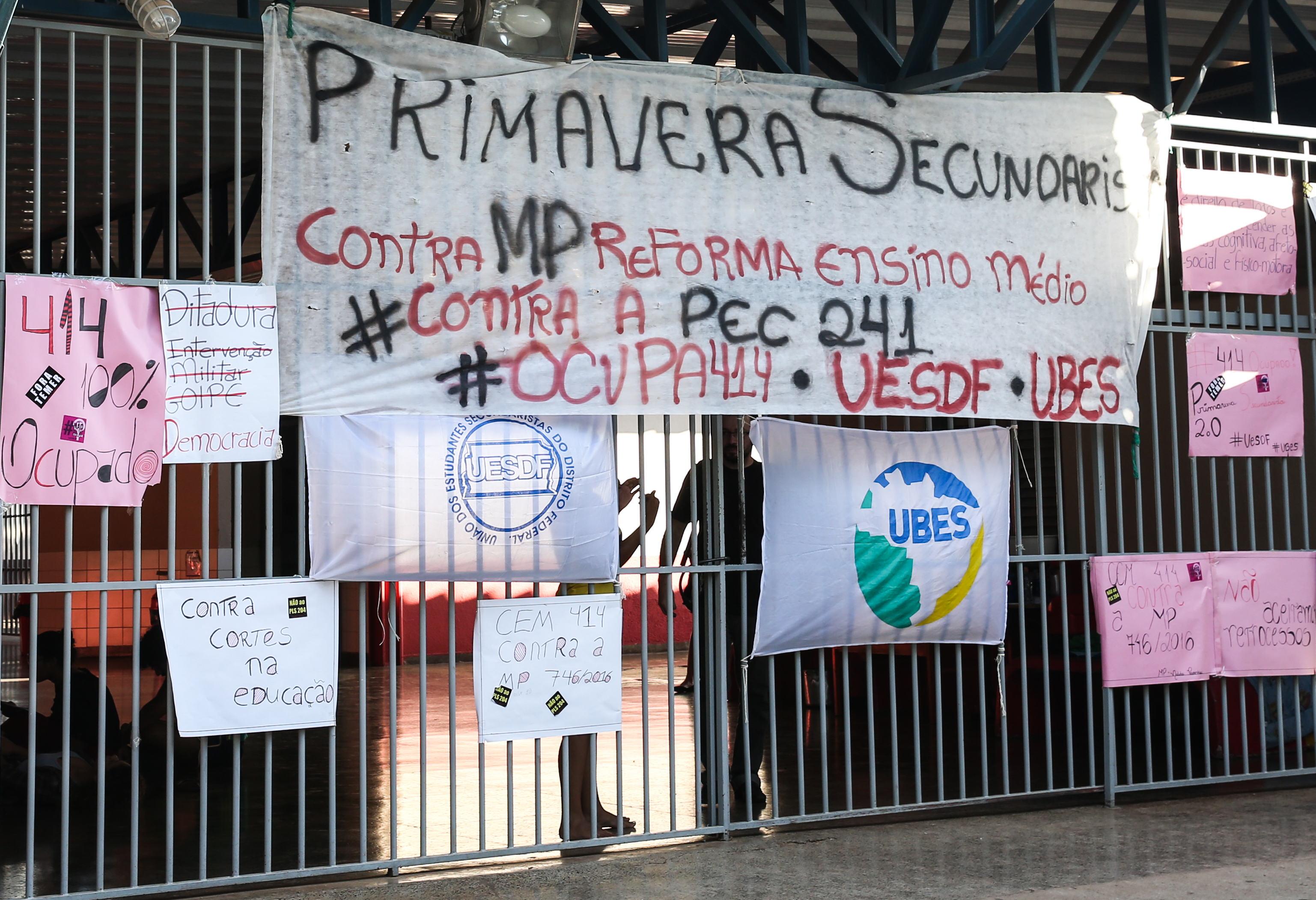
- Public school occupied by high school students, in Brasília
- Date: 2 January 2016 – 27 November 2016
- Location: Brazil - 22 states and the Federal District
- Caused by: Low quality of school lunch and infrastructure; Management of many state and federal governments; "Novo Ensino Médio" (MP 746/2016); PEC 241/2016 and PLS 193/2016 bills
- Goals: More investments and better conditions in education for students and teachers; Fight against corruption; Stop the high school reform announced by president Michel Temer; Stop the approval of bills such as PEC 241/16 and PLS 193/16, known as "Nonpartisan School", in the National Congress; End of salary installments for teachers in Rio Grande do Sul by governor José Ivo Sartori
- Methods: Demonstration; Student protest

Parties
Federal Government; State Governments: • São Paulo; • Goiás; • Rio Grande do Sul; • Paraná; • Rio de Janeiro; • Other state governments	High school students; College students; National Union of Students; Brazilian Union of High School Students

Lead figures
President Michel Temer; State Governors: • Geraldo Alckmin; • Marconi Perillo; • José Ivo Sartori; • Beto Richa; • Luiz Fernando Pezão; • Other state governors	Non-centralized leadership; Carina Vitral (UNE); Camila Lanes (UBES)

Casualties
- Deaths: 2
- Injuries: 207

The Student mobilisation in Brazil in 2016 (Portuguese: Mobilização estudantil no Brasil em 2016) corresponded to a series of demonstrations and occupations in Brazilian secondary schools and universities that intensified during the second half of 2016. The mobilisations were carried out by high school and university students in several states in Brazil.

The demonstrations aimed to stop projects and measures by the state governments of Geraldo Alckmin, Marconi Perillo, José Ivo Sartori, Beto Richa, Luiz Fernando Pezão and the government of then President Michel Temer. The students protested the bills from the "PEC of the spending ceiling" to PEC 241, project "School without a Party", PL 44 and the provisional measure of the New High School.

Possibly inspired by the wave of student mobilisations in São Paulo in 2015, students asked for more investments and better conditions in education for students and teachers as well as the improvement in the quality of school meals and the infrastructure of schools.

== See also ==
- Diretas Ja
