= Episcopal Conference of Brazil =

Assembly of the Catholic bishops of Brazil

- National Conference of Bishops of Brazil
- Conferência Nacional dos Bispos do Brasil
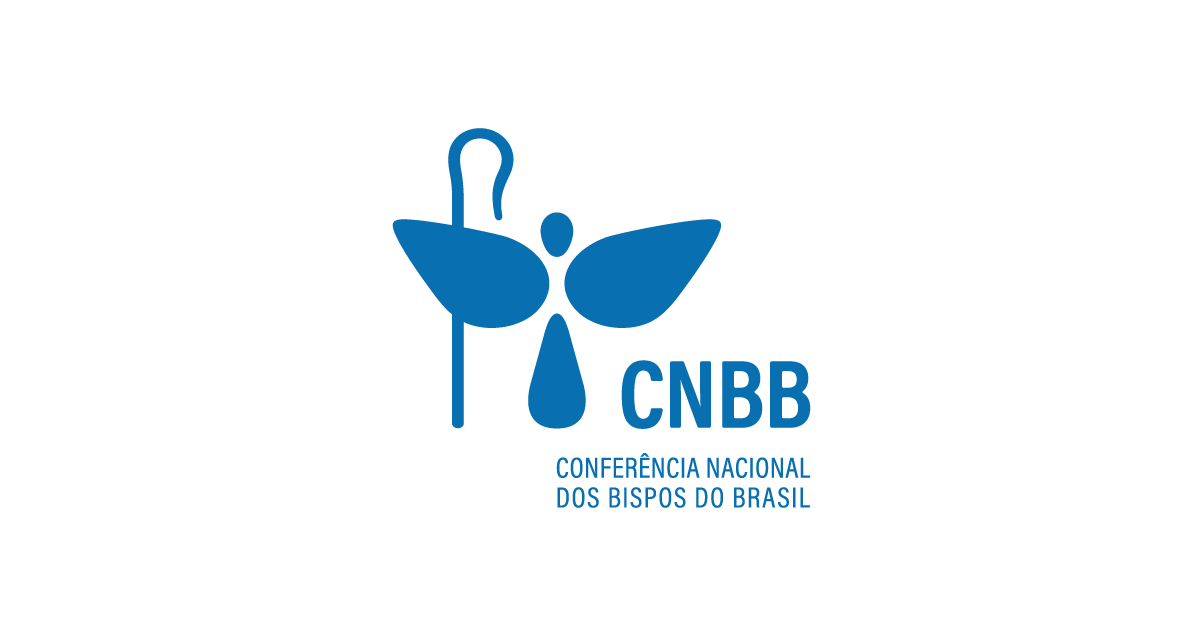
- Abbreviation: CNBB
- Type: Episcopal conference
- Headquarters: Brasília, Federal District, Brazil
- President: Cardinal Jaime Spengler, O.F.M.
- First Vice President: João Justino de Mediros Silva
- Second Vice President: Paulo Jackson Nóbrega de Sousa
- General Secretary: Ricardo Hoepers
- Website: www.cnbb.org.br

The National Conference of Bishops of Brazil (Portuguese: Conferência Nacional dos Bispos do Brasil, CNBB) is a permanent institution that groups all the Catholic bishops in Brazil that, according to the Code of Canon Law, "exercise certain pastoral functions for the Christian faithful of their territory in order to promote the greater good which the Church offers to humanity, especially through forms and programs of the apostolate fittingly adapted to the circumstances of time and place, according to the norm of law" (Can. 447).

All diocesan bishops in Brazil belong to CNBB along with coadjutor bishops, auxiliary bishops and other titular Bishops who exercise in the same territory a special charge, entrusted by the Apostolic See or by the Conference of Bishops (cf. Can. 450).

The CNBB was founded on October 14, 1952, in Rio de Janeiro, Brazil. The headquarters moved to Brasília in 1977.

== History ==
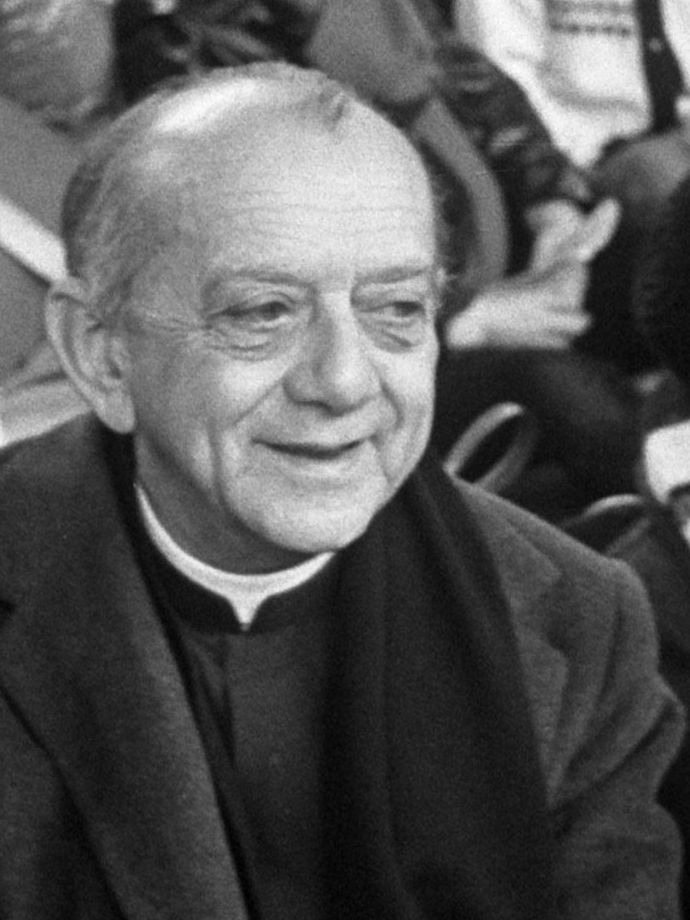
Helder Câmara, October 1974

At the beginning of the 1950s, Monsignor Montini, the future Pope Paul VI, urged the creation of an episcopal conference in Brazil, in a similar fashion to what was already happening in another countries.

Founded in October 14th, 1952, the organization's first meeting was held in the São Joaquim Palace, at Rio de Janeiro, concluding with the election of the first permanent commission thrusted to direct the entity. The elected bishops were Alfredo Scherer, Mário de Miranda Vilas Boas and Antônio Morais de Almeida Júnior.

Hélder Câmara, auxiliary bishop of the Archdiocese of Rio de Janeiro at the time, and one of the organization's main supporters for its creation, was elected secretary-general. The cardinal Carlos Carmelo Vasconcellos Motta, at the time archbishop of São Paulo, was chosen as the organization's first president, serving two terms.

At April 11th, 1967, the Republic's vice-president, Pedro Aleixo, acting as president-in-exercise, signed decree No. 60581, declaring the newly created CNBB as a public utility entity.

== Organization ==
The National Conference of Bishops of Brazil has the following groups:

- General Assembly
- Regional Councils
- Permanent Council
- Episcopal Commissions
- Presidency CNBB
- Economic and Fiscal Councils
- CONSEP
- Bound Bodies
- General Secretariat
- National Advisors

== Presidents ==
- Cardinal Carlos Carmelo Vasconcellos Motta, 1952–1958
- Cardinal Jaime de Barros Câmara, 1958–1964
- Cardinal Agnelo Rossi, 1964–1971
- Cardinal Aloísio Lorscheider, 1971–1979
- Ivo Lorscheiter, 1979–1987
- Luciano Mendes de Almeida, 1987–1995
- Cardinal Lucas Moreira Neves OP, 1995–1998
- Jayme Henrique Chemello, 1998–2003
- Cardinal Geraldo Majella Agnelo, 2003–2007
- Geraldo Lyrio Rocha, 2007–2011
- Cardinal Raymundo Damasceno Assis, 2011–2015
- Cardinal Sérgio da Rocha, 2015–2019
- Walmor Oliveira de Azevedo, 2019–2023
- Cardinal Jaime Spengler O.F.M, 2023–present

== See also ==
- Catholic Church in Brazil
- Fraternity Campaign
- National Eucharistic Congress (Brazil)
