= New Brazilian secondary education =

Brazil's new high school education system

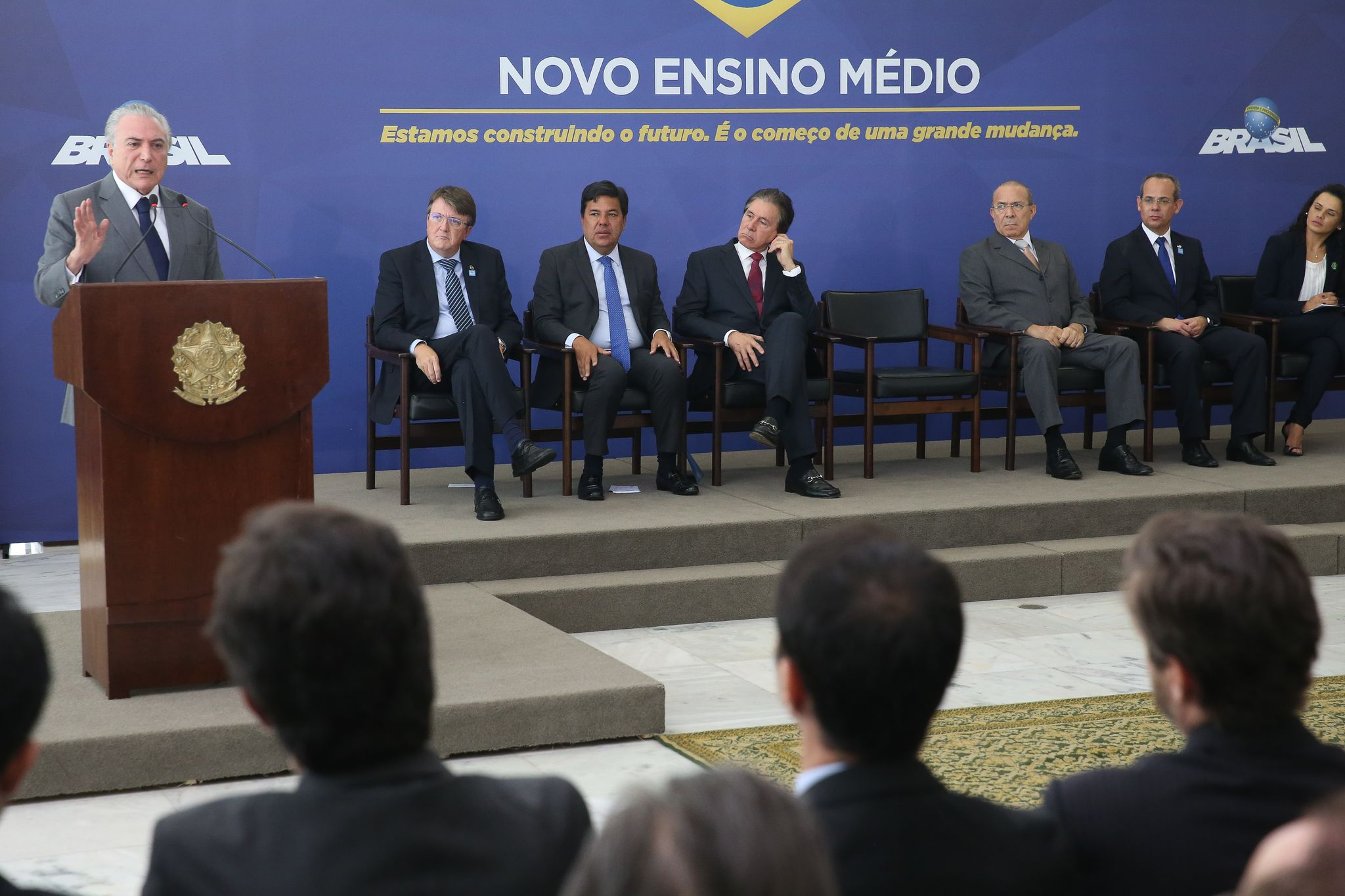
- President Michel Temer sanctions the reform of secondary education during a ceremony at the Planalto Palace

Chamber of Deputies
- Long title: Federal Law No. 13,415 of 2017
- Territorial extent: Whole of Brazil
- Enacted by: Chamber of Deputies
- Enacted: December 13, 2016
- Enacted by: Federal Senate
- Enacted: February 8th, 2017
- Signed by: President Michel Temer
- Signed: February 16, 2017
- Effective: February 17, 2017

Legislative history

Initiating chamber: Chamber of Deputies
- Bill title: Provisional Measure No. 746 of 2016
- Introduced by: President Michel Temer

Revising chamber: Federal Senate
- Passed: February 8th, 2017
- Voting summary: 43 voted for; 13 voted against
- Status: In force

The new Brazilian secondary education (Portuguese: Novo Ensino Médio) is a government educational policy instituted by Federal Law No. 13,415 of 2017, based on Provisional Measure No. 746 of 2016, which caused the secondary school reform. (Note: Amends the National Education Guidelines and Bases Law of December 20, 1996, which establishes the guidelines and bases of national education, and Law No. 11494, of June 20, 2007, which regulates the Fund for the Maintenance and Development of Basic Education and the Valorization of Education Professionals, the Consolidation of Labor Laws (CLT) and Decree No. 236, of February 1, 1967. Repeals Law No. 1161, of August 5, 2005, and establishes the Policy for Promoting the Implementation of Full-Time High Schools.) It aims to provide flexibility in the subjects taught to secondary school students in Brazil, establishing compulsory and optional disciplines. It also includes an increase in the workload over the years. Mendonça Filho, then Minister of Education, believed that the reform would help combat school dropouts and encourage the expansion of full-time education. Critics claim that it will weaken basic education in Brazil.

On February 8, 2017, the Provisional Measure was approved in the Senate by 43 votes to 13; on February 16, it was sanctioned by President Michel Temer. The text divides the content of secondary education into 60% compulsory subjects, which will be defined by the Common National Curriculum Base (BNCC), and 40% optional subjects. Students must choose an area of interest among languages, mathematics, humanities, natural sciences and professional education.

Schools will have a deadline to increase their workload from 800 hours a year to 1,000 hours (or from four hours a day to five hours a day), in order to gradually implement full-time teaching. The annual workload must reach 1,400 hours, but there is no deadline for this.

== Background ==
In 2013, a secondary school reform proposal by Reginaldo Lopes, a federal deputy from Minas Gerais affiliated to the Workers' Party (PT), was being discussed in the Chamber of Deputies under Bill No. 6.840. At the time, he claimed that the secondary school curriculum was outdated, had too many compulsory subjects and didn't recognize the individual differences of the students.

== Definitions and objectives ==
The secondary school curriculum was defined by the Common National Curriculum Base (BNCC). The document is composed of 4 areas of knowledge plus 1 area of technical and professional training. One of the aims of the project is to promote an increase in the workload in order to meet target 6 of the National Education Plan (PNE), which stipulates that 50% of schools and 25% of enrolments in basic education should be in full-time education by 2024.

== Reception and repercussions ==
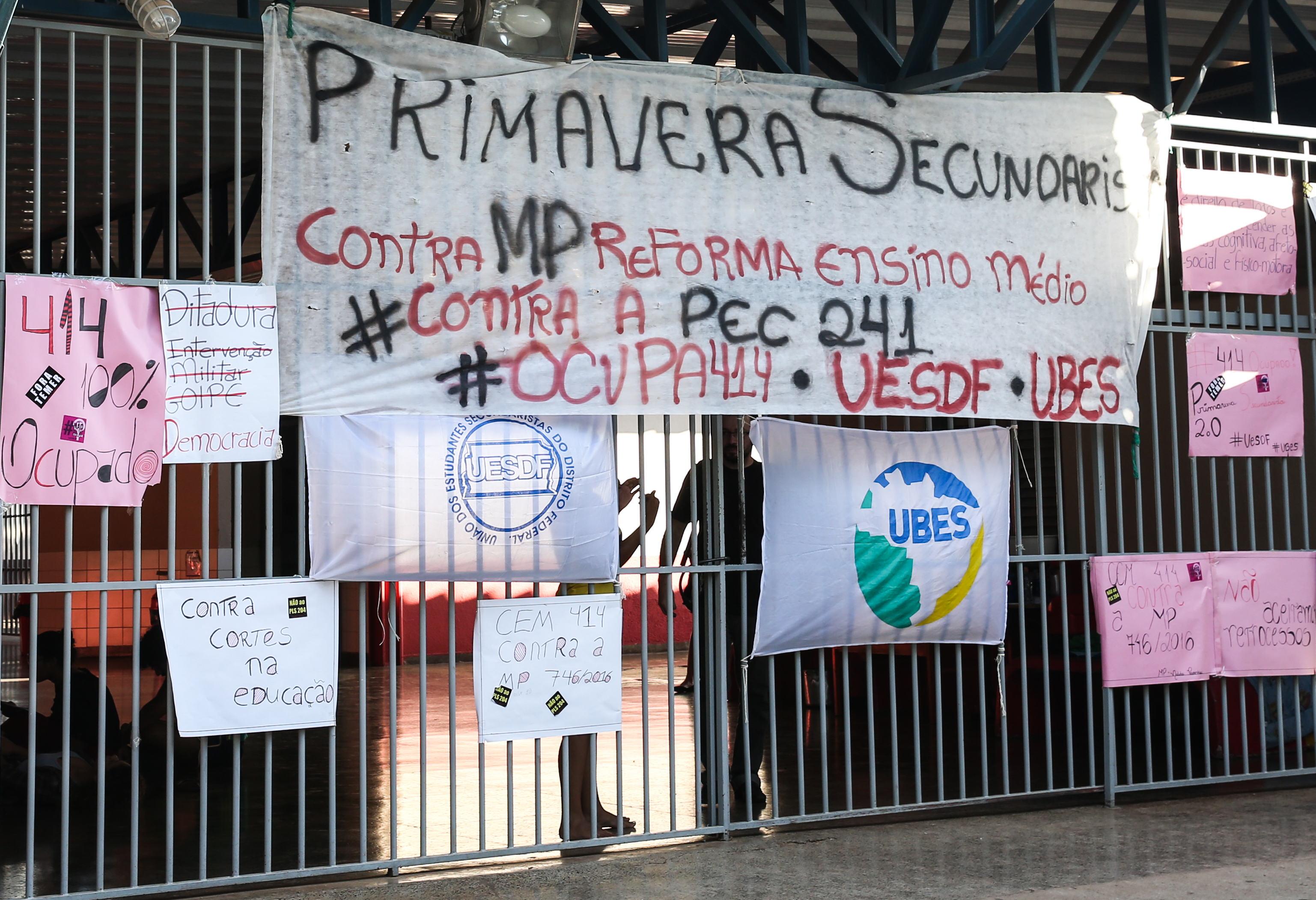
High school students occupy school against reform in Brasilia.

The reform is considered controversial and has divided the opinions of educators. Students held large mobilizations across Brazil, especially in the states of Minas Gerais and Paraná, against the amendment. Deputy Thiago Peixoto (PSD-GO) stated that the protests were partly due to misinformation about the content of the provisional measure. One of the main points of praise for the proposal is that it makes subjects more flexible.

Daniel Cara, general coordinator of the National Campaign for the Right to Education, is one of the main critics of the reform. A citizen from Rio Grande do Sul sent a bill to the Federal Senate via the e-Citizenship Portal suggesting that philosophy and sociology become compulsory subjects in high school. The suggestion was included by the Human Rights Commission in Bill No. 2579 of 2019.

=== Protests against the new secondary education ===
Protests to repeal the new secondary school system took place on March 15, 2023, in 56 cities across Brazil. The new format, which became compulsory in 2022, has been the target of much criticism, especially regarding the reduction in the workload of traditional subjects. The demonstrators, mostly secondary school students, called on the Lula government to repeal the current model, while the Minister of Education, Camilo Santana, admitted that it was necessary to make "adjustments".

== Application schedule ==
In June 2021, the Ministry of Education announced the timetable for implementing the secondary school reform, which began in 2022 and ended in 2024, when the ENEM became aligned with the new format. After protests and criticism from students and civil organizations, the reform schedule was suspended for 90 days.

== See also ==
- Presidency of Michel Temer
- Brazil labor reform
- 2016 student protests in Brazil
