= 1998 Brazilian general election =

- 4 October 1998
- Presidential election
- Turnout: 78.51% (▼3.73 pp)

Candidate	Fernando Henrique Cardoso	Lula da Silva	Ciro Gomes
Party	PSDB	PT	PPS
Alliance	Union, Work and Progress	Union of People Change Brazil	Real and Fair Brazil
Running mate	Marco Maciel (PFL)	Leonel Brizola (PDT)	Roberto Freire
Popular vote	35,922,692	21,470,333	7,424,783
Percentage	53.06%	31.71%	10.97%
- Presidential election results by state
President before election
Fernando Henrique Cardoso
PSDB
Elected President
Fernando Henrique Cardoso
PSDB
- Chamber of Deputies
- All 513 seats in the Chamber of Deputies; 257 seats needed for a majority
Party	Leader	Vote %	Seats	+/–
Chamber of Deputies
PSDB	Teotônio Vilela Filho	17.54	99	+37
PFL	Jorge Bornhausen	17.30	105	+16
PMDB	Orestes Quércia	15.17	83	−24
PT	José Dirceu	13.19	58	+9
PPB		11.35	60	New
PDT	Leonel Brizola	5.67	25	−9
PTB		5.66	31	0
PSB		3.41	19	+4
PL	Alvaro Valle	2.47	12	−1
PPS		1.31	3	+1
PCdoB		1.30	7	−3
PRONA	Enéas Carneiro	0.89	1	+1
PSD		0.76	3	0
PSC		0.67	3	0
PMN		0.54	2	−2
PST		0.29	1	New
PSL		0.27	1	New
This lists parties that won seats. See the complete results below.
- Senate
- 27 of the 81 seats in the Federal Senate
Party	Leader	Vote %	Seats
Senate
MDB	Orestes Quércia	21.69	10
PT	José Dirceu	18.42	6
PPB		14.95	1
PFL	Jorge Bornhausen	11.40	5
PSDB	Teotônio Vilela Filho	10.30	4
PSB		6.39	1
This lists parties that won seats. See the complete results below.

General elections were held in Brazil on 4 October 1998 to elect the President, National Congress and state governorships. If no candidate in the presidential election received more than 50% of the vote in the first round, a second-round runoff would have been held on 25 October. The election saw voting machines used for the first time in Brazilian history.

Elected in 1994 amidst a hyperinflation crisis, President Fernando Henrique Cardoso of the centre-right Brazilian Social Democratic Party (PSDB) prioritized price stability policies during his term. Other notable policies pursued by Cardoso included the declaration of Decree 1775, which allowed for increased commercial interest in indigenous lands, and the privatization of publicly-owned companies. Vice President Marco Maciel of the conservative Liberal Front Party (PFL) served as Cardoso's running mate, as he did in the previous election.

Luiz Inácio Lula da Silva of the Workers' Party (PT), a former labor leader and federal deputy, ran for the presidency for a third time. Lula had previously run for the presidency in both 1989, where he lost to Fernando Collor, and 1994, where he lost to Cardoso. Lula chose Leonel Brizola of the Democratic Labour Party (PDT), a longtime fixture of the Brazilian Left who was a chief competitor of his in 1989, as his running mate.

In addition to Lula, Ciro Gomes, a populist who previously served as Governor of Ceará and as Minister of Finance in the conservative government of President Itamar Franco, mounted his own campaign. Running as a member of the centre-left Popular Socialist Party (PPS), Ciro attempted to present himself as a progressive alternative to Lula.

Cardoso won reelection with an absolute majority in the first round, negating the need for a second round. In doing so, he became the first President of Brazil to be reelected since the fall of the military dictatorship. Four years later, Lula would succeed him after winning the 2002 presidential election, while Ciro would mount a second presidential bid in the same election, where he came in fourth place.

As of 2026, this remains the most recent time a right-leaning presidential candidate won most of the Northeast (more specifically, winning the states of Bahia, Maranhão, Paraíba, Pernambuco, Piauí, Rio Grande do Norte, and Sergipe) as well as the states of Pará and Tocantins.

== Background ==
Fernando Henrique Cardoso, better known as "FHC", had been inaugurated as president on January 1, 1995, after defeating Luiz Inácio Lula da Silva, his main rival in the 1994 election, in the first round by an advantage of almost 30 million votes. FHC had based his first presidential campaign in the then newly launched Real Plan and the promise of stabilizing the economy of Brazil. As a matter of fact, the plan had a positive effect during the first years of his administration, being able to curb the exorbitant inflation rates, stabilize the exchange rate, and increase the purchasing power of the Brazilian population without shocks or price freezing.

On the very first day of his administration, the Treaty of Asunción came into force. Signed by Fernando Collor de Mello, it predicted the implementation of Mercosur, a free trade area between Brazil, Argentina, Uruguay, and Paraguay. Moreover, the first FHC administration was marked by political and economic reforms, such as the end of the state monopolies in oil and telecommunications, the reform on the social security plans, and the change in the concept of "national company".

Although approved in the Congress, the reforms carried by the federal government met strong resistance from the opposition, most notably the Workers' Party, which fiercely criticized the privatization of companies such as Vale do Rio Doce and the constitutional amendment that allowed the re-election of officeholders in the Executive branch. As a result, Peter Mandelson, a close aide to then British Prime Minister and Labour Party leader Tony Blair, alleged that the Workers' Party's proposals represented "an old-fashioned and out-of-date socialism". At that time, FHC-Blair relations were magnified, once both of them were adherents of the Third Way.

Despite its political victories, the government needed to impose measures to cool down the domestic demand and help the trade balance, which eventually caused unemployment to grow and made the economy show signs of recession. Other areas, such as health, education and land reform also suffered major crises. The violent conflict in the countryside reached its peak with the Eldorado dos Carajás massacre. Thus, FHC's reelection campaign was based on the idea that the continuity of his government was essential for the stabilization to reach areas other than the economy, such as health, agriculture, employment, education, and public security.

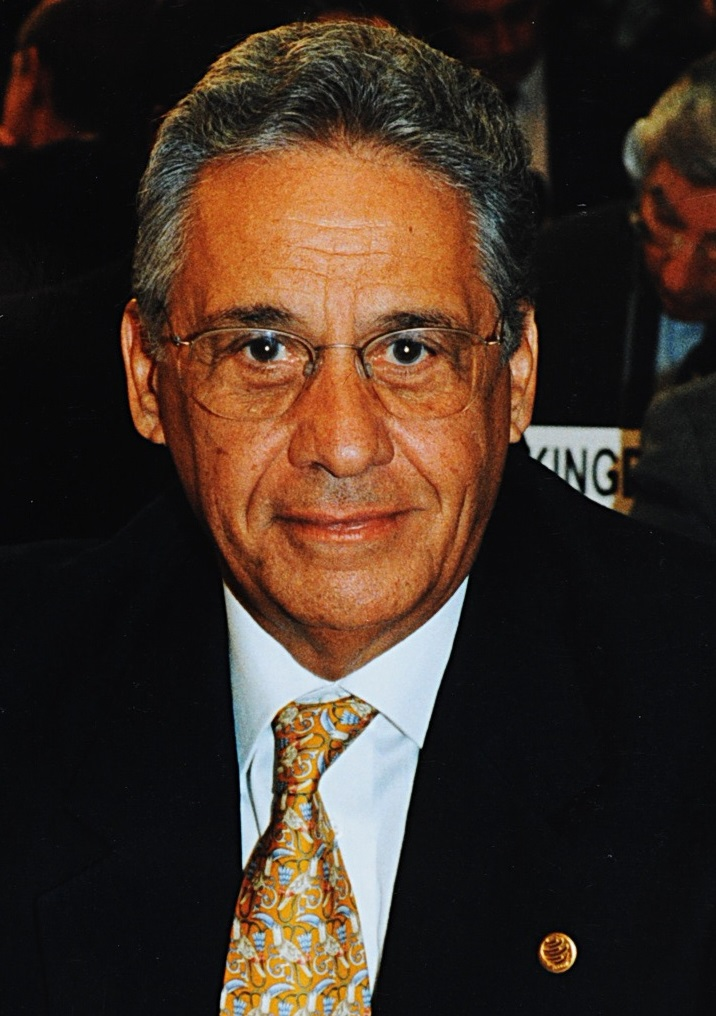
President Fernando Henrique Cardoso in 1998.

== Presidential election ==
=== Candidates ===
The 1998 presidential race had twelve candidates, the largest number of candidates since the 1989 election, when over twenty candidacies were launched. The number could have been as high as fifteen, but the Electoral Justice withdrew the candidacy of impeached President Fernando Collor de Mello, while Oswaldo Souza Oliveira and João Olivar Farias declined to run.

==== Brazilian Social Democratic Party (PSDB) ====
The Brazilian Social Democratic Party (PSDB) reprised the coalition which had elected Cardoso four years prior, comprising the Liberal Front Party (PFL) and the Brazilian Labour Party (PTB). They were joined by the Progressive Party (PPB), the Social Democratic Party (PSD), and the Social Liberal Party (PSL). Once again, PFL member Marco Maciel served as Cardoso's running mate.

Workers' Party (PT)

The Workers' Party reprised its past two candidacies, by launching former union leader and federal deputy Luiz Inácio Lula da Silva as its candidate and forming a coalition with the Communist Party of Brazil, and the Brazilian Socialist Party. Other PT members, such as former Mayor of Porto Alegre Tarso Genro, were mentioned as potential candidates. Indeed, it was reported in 1997 that Lula was willing to give up his candidacy in favor of backing a bid by Genro, though this did not come to fruition.

The novelty in this election was the choice of longtime fixture of the Brazilian Left Leonel Brizola, a member of the Democratic Labour Party (PDT), as his running mate. Unlike in 1994, when close Lula ally and fellow PT member Aloizio Mercadante was chosen as Lula's running mate, Brizola had previously been a rival of Lula's, serving as his main opposition on the left in the 1989 election. The PT previously refrained from forming coalitions with parties linked to varguista labour unions to guarantee the Central Única dos Trabalhadores' (CUT) independence. As a result, the United Socialist Workers' Party left the coalition and launched union leader José Maria de Almeida as its candidate.

Brizola was noted for his combative style in contrast to Lula's more "diplomatic" tone on the campaign trail, while led the Folha de S.Paulo to declare that he "outshine[d]" Lula in their first joint appearance.

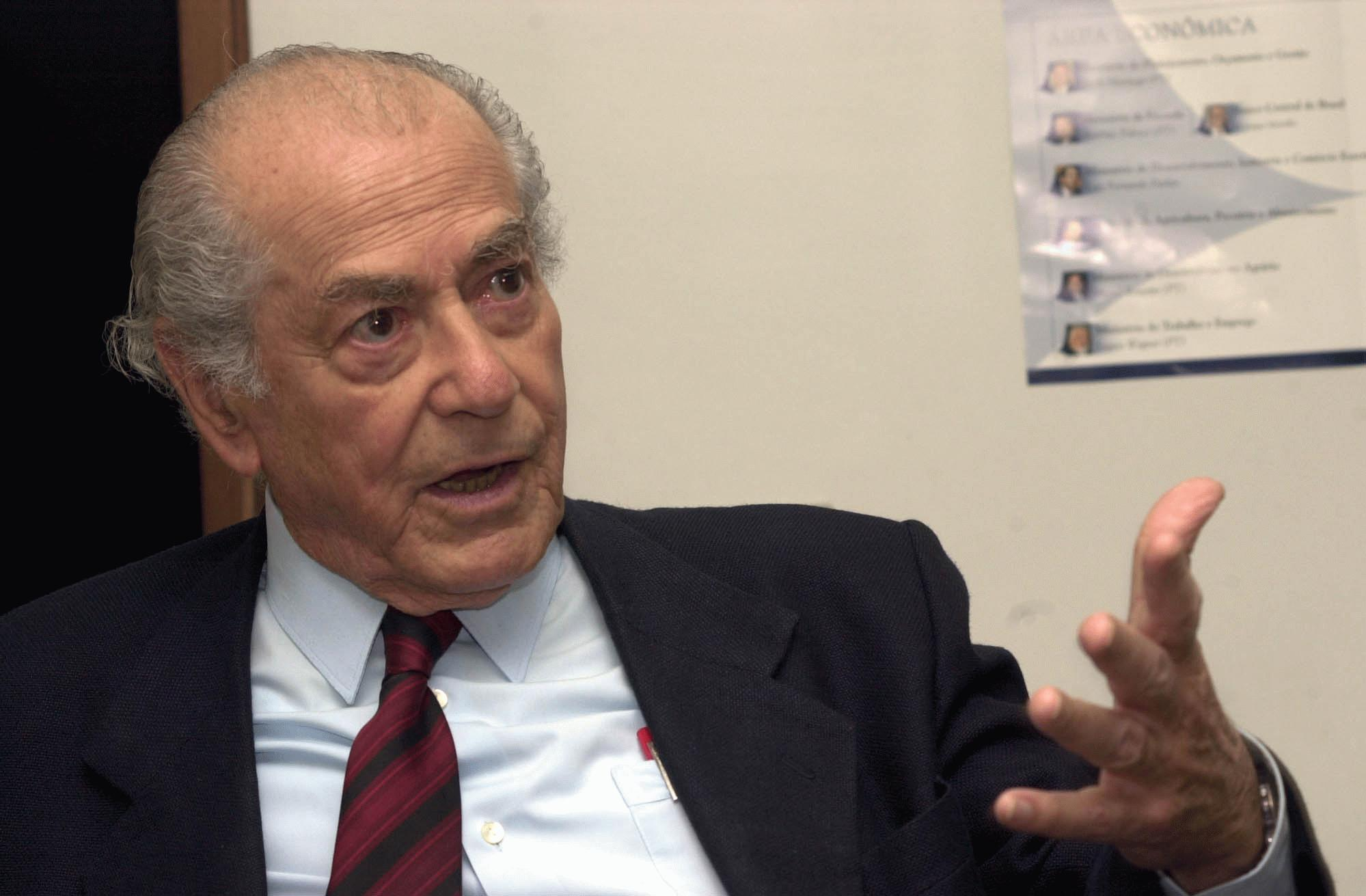
Leonel Brizola, a longtime fixture of the Brazilian Left, who served as the running mate of his former rival Lula in the 1998 election.

==== Socialist People's Party (PPS) ====
Former Governor of Ceará Ciro Gomes run for president, and, therefore, his Socialist People's Party (PPS) did not join the Workers' Party coalition as they did in the previous election. After Oswaldo Souza Oliveira's quit the race, his Party of the Nation's Retirees decided to support Gomes.

==== Other candidates ====
After securing the third place in the 1994 election, Enéas Carneiro from the far-right Party of the Reconstruction of the National Order (PRONA) also run in 1998. This time, however, he only received 1.4 million votes, against 4.6 million in 1994. Carneiro's running mate was Irapuan Teixeira, a professor who would later become a member of the Chamber of Deputies as a member of PRONA.

This election also brought the second woman candidate ever: Thereza Tinajero Ruiz from the National Labor Party, which replaced Dorival Masci de Abreu.

Party	Candidate	Most relevant political office or occupation	Party	Running mate	Coalition	Electoral number
Workers' Party (PT)	Luiz Inácio Lula da Silva	Member of the Chamber of Deputies from São Paulo (1987–1991)	Democratic Labour Party (PDT)	Leonel Brizola	Union of the People Change Brazil: Workers' Party (PT); Democratic Labour Party (PDT); Brazilian Socialist Party (PSB); Communist Party of Brazil (PCdoB); Brazilian Communist Party (PCB)	13
United Socialist Workers' Party (PSTU)	José Maria de Almeida	PSTU National President (since 1993)	United Socialist Workers' Party (PSTU)	José Galvão de Lima	—N/a	16
National Labour Party (PTN)	Thereza Ruiz		National Labour Party (PTN)	Eduardo Gomes	—N/a	19
Social Christian Party (PSC)	Sérgio Bueno		Social Christian Party (PSC)	Ronald Azaro	—N/a	20
Popular Socialist Party (PPS)	Ciro Gomes	Governor of Ceará (1991–1994)	Popular Socialist Party (PPS)	Roberto Freire	Real and Fair Brazil: Popular Socialist Party (PPS); Liberal Party (PL); Party of the Nations' Retirees (PAN)	23
Christian Social Democratic Party (PSDC)	José Maria Eymael	Member of the Chamber of Deputies from São Paulo (1987–1995)	Christian Social Democratic Party (PSDC)	Josmar Alderete	—N/a	27
National Solidarity Party (PSN)	Vasco Azevedo Neto	Member of the Chamber of Deputies from Bahia (1971–1989)	National Solidarity Party (PSN)	Alexandre Santos	—N/a	31
Party of National Mobilization (PMN)	Ivan Frota	Lieutenant-brigadier of the Brazilian Air Force	Party of National Mobilization (PMN)	João Ferreira da Silva	—N/a	33
Green Party (PV)	Alfredo Sirkis	Member of the Municipal Chamber of Rio de Janeiro (1989–1997)	Green Party (PV)	Carla Piranda Rabello	—N/a	43
Brazilian Social Democracy Party (PSDB)	Fernando Henrique Cardoso	President of Brazil (1995–2003)	Liberal Front Party (PFL)	Marco Maciel	Union, Work and Progres: Brazilian Social Democracy Party (PSDB); Liberal Front Party (PFL); Brazilian Progressive Party; Brazilian Labour Party (PTB); Social Democratic Party (PSD)	45
Party of the Reconstruction of the National Order (PRONA)	Enéas Carneiro	PRONA National President (1989–2006)	Party of the Reconstruction of the National Order (PRONA)	Irapuan Teixeira	—N/a	56
Labour Party of Brazil (PTdoB)	João de Deus		Labour Party of Brazil (PTdoB)	Nanci Pilar	—N/a	70

== Results ==
=== President ===
Candidate	Running mate	Party	Votes	%
Fernando Henrique Cardoso	Marco Maciel (PFL)	Brazilian Social Democracy Party	35,936,540	53.06
Luiz Inácio Lula da Silva	Leonel Brizola (PDT)	Workers' Party	21,475,218	31.71
Ciro Gomes	Roberto Freire	Popular Socialist Party	7,426,190	10.97
Enéas Carneiro	Irapuan Teixeira	Party of the Reconstruction of the National Order	1,447,090	2.14
Ivan Frota	João Ferreira da Silva	Party of National Mobilization	251,337	0.37
Alfredo Sirkis	Carla Miranda Rabello	Green Party	212,984	0.31
José Maria de Almeida	José Galvão de Lima	United Socialist Workers' Party	202,659	0.30
João de Deus	Nanci Pilar	Labour Party of Brazil	198,916	0.29
José Maria Eymael	Josmar Alderete	Christian Social Democratic Party	171,831	0.25
Thereza Ruiz	Eduardo Gomes	National Labour Party	166,138	0.25
Sérgio Bueno	Ronald Azaro	Social Christian Party	124,659	0.18
Vasco Azevedo Neto	Alexandre José dos Santos	National Solidarity Party	109,003	0.16
Total			67,722,565	100.00
Valid votes			67,722,565	81.30
Invalid/blank votes			15,575,298	18.70
Total votes			83,297,863	100.00
Registered voters/turnout			106,101,067	78.51
Source: Nohlen

==== Results by federative unit ====
Federative unit	Cardoso		Lula		Ciro		Carneiro		Others	
Federative unit	Votes	%	Votes	%	Votes	%	Votes	%	Votes	%
Acre	90,363	46.80	59,690	30.91	26,909	13.94	10,362	5.37	5,757	2.98
Alagoas	394,872	54.79	161,584	22.42	146,729	20.36	6,664	0.92	10,804	1.50
Amapá	68,277	42.32	62,394	38.68	25,349	15.71	3,237	2.01	2,061	1.28
Amazonas	452,076	54.70	211,507	25.59	128,811	15.59	16,093	1.95	17,949	2.17
Bahia	1,977,801	50.92	1,372,797	35.34	327,923	8.44	90,575	2.33	115,084	2.96
Ceará	804,969	30.31	872,290	32.84	909,402	34.24	12,294	0.46	57,148	2.15
Espírito Santo	814,535	64.75	263,636	20.96	134,675	10.71	18,836	1.50	26,329	2.09
Federal District	391,201	40.45	287,579	29.73	265,838	27.49	13,092	1.35	9,432	0.98
Goiás	1,247,510	65.96	371,175	19.62	195,851	10.35	34,222	1.81	42,643	2.25
Maranhão	736,042	48.63	444,912	29.39	246,268	16.27	24,910	1.65	61,577	4.07
Mato Grosso	663,773	73.10	149,462	16.46	67,688	7.45	12,012	1.32	15,118	1.66
Mato Grosso do Sul	520,471	61.26	210,120	24.73	89,951	10.59	11,981	1.41	17,147	2.02
Minas Gerais	4,225,240	55.68	2,129,100	28.06	883,377	11.64	156,826	2.07	194,254	2.56
Pará	1,020,868	56.81	530,772	29.54	165,670	9.22	30,538	1.70	49,040	2.73
Paraíba	541,067	45.26	402,293	33.65	191,878	16.05	15,889	1.33	44,353	3.71
Paraná	2,492,531	59.25	1,168,853	27.78	400,966	9.53	81,334	1.93	63,224	1.50
Pernambuco	1,637,394	57.22	890,971	31.14	212,168	7.41	32,393	1.13	88,426	3.09
Piauí	482,649	48.09	270,465	26.95	185,997	18.53	12,497	1.25	52,026	5.18
Rio de Janeiro	2,848,277	42.28	2,851,274	42.32	708,279	10.51	233,921	3.47	95,637	1.42
Rio Grande do Norte	525,842	50.72	267,883	25.84	193,496	18.66	14,427	1.39	35,133	3.39
Rio Grande do Sul	2,036,805	40.61	2,460,551	49.05	277,866	5.54	181,750	3.62	59,147	1.18
Rondônia	323,743	66.40	103,927	21.32	39,398	8.08	7,218	1.48	13,243	2.72
Roraima	71,768	61.92	20,601	17.78	20,138	17.38	2,353	2.03	1,036	0.89
Santa Catarina	1,255,253	49.43	929,698	36.61	252,659	9.95	55,133	2.17	46,849	1.84
São Paulo	9,736,728	59.89	4,688,677	28.84	1,208,718	7.43	389,592	2.40	235,103	1.45
Sergipe	297,243	47.38	221,565	35.31	71,233	11.35	11,503	1.83	25,854	4.12
Tocantins	265,393	66.68	66,607	16.73	47,566	11.95	7,131	1.79	11,323	2.84
Source: Carr

=== Chamber of Deputies ===
Party	Votes	%	Seats	+/–
Brazilian Social Democracy Party	11,684,900	17.54	99	+37
Liberal Front Party	11,526,193	17.30	105	+16
Brazilian Democratic Movement Party	10,105,609	15.17	83	–24
Workers' Party	8,786,499	13.19	58	+9
Brazilian Progressive Party	7,558,601	11.35	60	New
Democratic Labour Party	3,776,541	5.67	25	–9
Brazilian Labour Party	3,768,260	5.66	31	0
Brazilian Socialist Party	2,273,751	3.41	19	–4
Liberal Party	1,643,881	2.47	12	–1
Popular Socialist Party	872,348	1.31	3	+1
Communist Party of Brazil	869,270	1.30	7	–3
Party of the Reconstruction of the National Order	592,632	0.89	1	+1
Social Democratic Party	503,713	0.76	3	0
Social Christian Party	446,256	0.67	3	0
Party of National Mobilization	360,298	0.54	2	–2
Green Party	292,691	0.44	0	–1
Progressive Republican Party	255,509	0.38	0	–1
Labour Party of Brazil	216,640	0.33	0	0
Social Labour Party	193,562	0.29	1	New
United Socialist Workers' Party	187,675	0.28	0	0
Social Liberal Party	177,037	0.27	1	New
National Solidarity Party	136,829	0.21	0	New
National Labour Party	64,712	0.10	0	New
Party of the Nation's Retirees	62,653	0.09	0	New
Christian Social Democratic Party	62,057	0.09	0	New
National Reconstruction Party	54,641	0.08	0	–1
Brazilian Labour Renewal Party	53,778	0.08	0	0
Brazilian Communist Party	49,620	0.07	0	0
Workers' General Party	27,825	0.04	0	New
Workers' Cause Party	8,067	0.01	0	New
Total	66,612,048	100.00	513	0
Valid votes	66,612,048	79.98		
Invalid/blank votes	16,668,707	20.02		
Total votes	83,280,755	100.00		
Registered voters/turnout	106,053,106	78.53		
Source: Nohlen, Senate

=== Senate ===
Party	Votes	%	Seats	
Party	Votes	%	Elected	Total
Brazilian Democratic Movement Party	13,414,074	21.69	10	26
Workers' Party	11,392,662	18.42	6	7
Brazilian Progressive Party	9,246,089	14.95	1	3
Liberal Front Party	7,047,853	11.40	5	20
Brazilian Social Democracy Party	6,366,681	10.30	4	16
Brazilian Socialist Party	3,949,025	6.39	1	3
Democratic Labour Party	3,195,863	5.17	0	4
Brazilian Labour Party	2,449,479	3.96	0	1
Popular Socialist Party	1,846,897	2.99	0	1
Communist Party of Brazil	559,218	0.90	0	0
Party of the Reconstruction of the National Order	376,043	0.61	0	0
Social Christian Party	371,873	0.60	0	0
United Socialist Workers' Party	371,618	0.60	0	0
Social Labour Party	213,643	0.35	0	0
Green Party	163,425	0.26	0	0
Party of National Mobilization	144,541	0.23	0	0
Christian Social Democratic Party	114,573	0.19	0	0
National Solidarity Party	110,080	0.18	0	0
National Reconstruction Party	99,077	0.16	0	0
Progressive Republican Party	76,969	0.12	0	0
Liberal Party	71,974	0.12	0	0
Brazilian Labour Renewal Party	67,586	0.11	0	0
Labour Party of Brazil	62,086	0.10	0	0
Party of the Nation's Retirees	43,389	0.07	0	0
National Labour Party	42,042	0.07	0	0
Social Democratic Party	18,647	0.03	0	0
Social Liberal Party	12,870	0.02	0	0
Workers' General Party	11,810	0.02	0	0
Workers' Cause Party	274	0.00	0	0
Total	61,840,361	100.00	27	81
Valid votes	61,840,361	74.26		
Invalid/blank votes	21,435,568	25.74		
Total votes	83,275,929	100.00		
Registered voters/turnout	106,053,106	78.52		
Source: Nohlen, IPU
