= 2002 Brazilian general election =

- Presidential election
- 6 October 2002 (first round); 27 October 2002 (second round)
- Turnout: 82.26% (first round, ▲3.75 pp); 79.53% (second round)
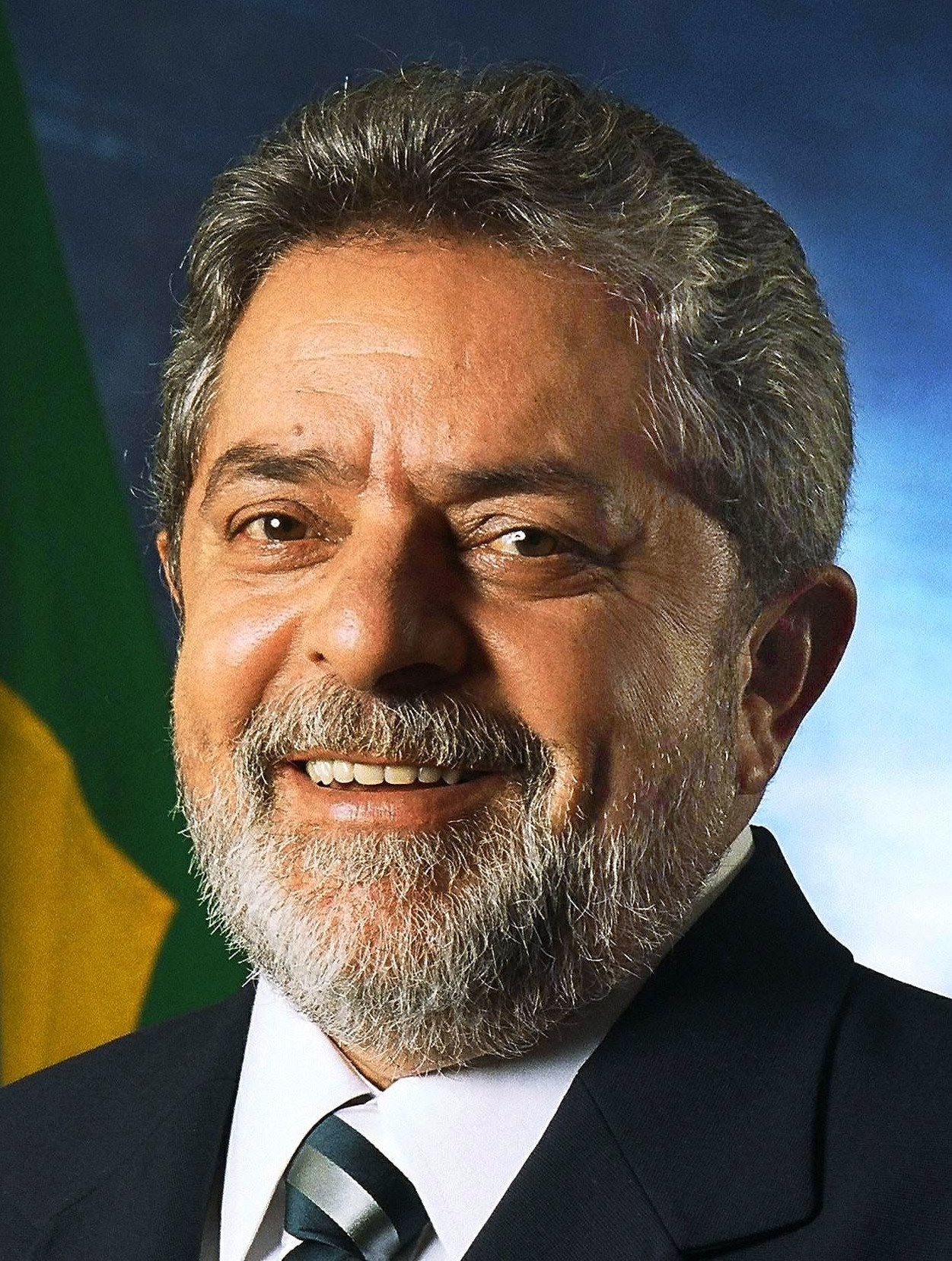

| Candidate | Lula da Silva | José Serra |
| Party | PT | PSDB |
| Alliance | Lula President | Grand Alliance |
| Running mate | José Alencar (PL) | Rita Camata (PMDB) |
| Popular vote | 52,793,364 | 33,370,739 |
| Percentage | 61.27% | 38.73% |
- Presidential election results
President before election
Fernando Henrique Cardoso
PSDB
Elected President
Luiz Inácio Lula da Silva
PT
- Chamber of Deputies
- 6 October 2002
- All 513 seats in the Chamber of Deputies; 257 seats needed for a majority
| Party | Leader | Vote % | Seats | +/– |
|---|---|---|---|---|
| PT | José Genoíno | 18.40 | 91 | +33 |
| PSDB | José Aníbal | 14.26 | 70 | −29 |
| PFL | Jorge Bornhausen | 13.38 | 84 | −21 |
| PMDB | | 13.37 | 76 | −7 |
| PPB | | 7.81 | 48 | −12 |
| PSB | Anthony Garotinho | 5.28 | 22 | +3 |
| PDT | | 5.12 | 21 | −4 |
| PTB | Roberto Jefferson | 4.63 | 26 | −5 |
| PL | Valdemar Costa Neto | 4.32 | 26 | +14 |
| PPS | | 3.07 | 15 | +12 |
| PCdoB | | 2.25 | 12 | +5 |
| PRONA | Enéas Carneiro | 2.06 | 6 | +5 |
| PV | | 1.35 | 5 | +5 |
| PSC | | 0.58 | 1 | −2 |
| PST | | 0.58 | 3 | +2 |
| PSD | | 0.52 | 4 | +1 |
| PSL | Luciano Bivar | 0.47 | 1 | +1 |
| PMN | | 0.32 | 1 | −1 |
| PSDC | | 0.22 | 1 | +1 |
This lists parties that won seats. See the complete results below.
- Federal Senate
- 6 October 2002
- 54 of the 81 seats in the Senate
| Party | Leader | Vote % | Seats | +/– |
|---|---|---|---|---|
| PT | José Genoíno | 22.03 | 14 | +7 |
| PFL | Jorge Bornhausen | 18.49 | 19 | −1 |
| PMDB | | 16.40 | 19 | −7 |
| PSDB | José Aníbal | 13.90 | 11 | −5 |
| PDT | | 5.16 | 5 | +1 |
| PPB | | 4.49 | 1 | −2 |
| PTB | Roberto Jefferson | 3.38 | 3 | +2 |
| PL | Valdemar Costa Neto | 3.16 | 3 | +3 |
| PPS | | 3.07 | 1 | 0 |
| PSB | | 2.21 | 4 | +1 |
| PSD | | 0.75 | 1 | +1 |
This lists parties that won seats. See the complete results below.

General elections were held in Brazil on 6 October 2002, with a second round of the presidential election on 27 October. The elections were held in the midst of an economic crisis that began in the second term of the incumbent president, Fernando Henrique Cardoso of the centre-right Brazilian Social Democracy Party (PSDB). Due to constitutional term limits, Cardoso was ineligible to run for a third consecutive term.

Luiz Inácio Lula da Silva of the Workers' Party (PT), a former labor leader and federal deputy for São Paulo, ran for president for a fourth time. Lula had previously lost in the 1989, 1994, and 1998 presidential elections, being defeated by Cardoso in the latter two. Lula somewhat moderated his political approach in the 2002 presidential campaign, writing a document now known as the Letter to the Brazilian people to ease fears that he would transition Brazil into a full-fledged socialist economy. Staying true to this turn to the center, Lula chose José Alencar, a millionaire textile businessman and Senator from Minas Gerais associated with the centre-right Liberal Party (PL), as his running mate.

Following a tense intra-party battle over who would run to succeed Cardoso on the PSDB ticket, former Minister of Health José Serra was ultimately selected by the party to be its standard bearer for President in 2002. Rita Camata, a federal deputy for Espírito Santo and member of the centrist Brazilian Democratic Movement Party (PMDB), was chosen as his running mate. In the beginning of the election cycle, Governor of Maranhão Roseana Sarney (PFL) looked to be the most viable centre-right candidate. However, a corruption scandal forced Sarney out of the race, allowing the PSDB to remain the paramount centre-right force in the 2002 cycle.

The election took place in the aftermath of an economic crisis that hit Brazil during Cardoso's second term. Lula's pivot to the centre worked, picking up the support of key centrist and centre-right politicians such as former President José Sarney in the process. In the first round, Lula led the field by a wide margin. However, due to the presence of other left-wing candidates, he came up just short of outright victory and was forced into a runoff with Serra. In the runoff, Lula defeated Serra by a landslide, winning every state except for Alagoas. In 2003, Lula took office as President of Brazil, becoming the first leftist elected to the office following the fall of the military dictatorship in Brazil.

The Workers' Party (PT) would win every election from 2002 until the 2018 Brazilian general election.

As of 2026, this remains the most recent time a right-leaning presidential candidate carried any northeastern states (Alagoas), which has since remained a left-wing stronghold on the federal level along with the rest of the Northeast.

== Background ==
During the second term of the Fernando Henrique Cardoso administration, a serious economic crisis began in Brazil as an impact of the 1997 Asian financial crisis. Commencing shortly after the 1998 elections, when Cardoso was re-elected, as a currency crisis, it resulted in a decrease in growth and employment rates and a rise in public debt.

In an environment of distrust and uncertainty for investment, many investors feared the measures that were going to be taken if a left-wing candidate won the election. As a matter of fact, when Workers' Party candidate Luiz Inácio Lula da Silva (Lula) would rise in the polls, the so-called "Brazil risk" index, which measures the confidence of investors in the country, would also rise.

The media called this the "Lula risk", indicating that if Lula was to win the election, the economy would fail. Lula was then forced to sign a text that became known as Carta aos Brasileiros (Letter to the Brazilian people), promising that if he won the election, he would not change the economic policy of Brazil. Many in the left-wing saw this as a shift to the center from Lula and his Workers' Party, which openly defended a transition to socialist economy in the 1989 presidential election.

== Presidential candidate nominations ==
=== Brazilian Social Democratic Party ===
With incumbent President Fernando Henrique Cardoso ineligible to run for a third consecutive term due to term limits, the dominant centre-right PSDB was forced to find a new candidate for the 2002 election. Given that Cardoso was elected with the help of a broad centre-right coalition, there existed fear among PSDB officials that another candidate would be unable to maintain his coalition.

José Serra, who had served as Minister of Health under Cardoso, was eventually chosen as the party's nominee. Outgoing President Cardoso was initially favorable to the prospect of Governor of Ceará Tasso Jereissati serving as the PSDB's presidential nominee in 2002. According to a report by The Economist, Jereissati enjoyed broader support among the PSDB's coalition partners than Serra, whose performance on the campaign trail was considered lackluster. Additionally, some PSDB insiders and political scientists feared that Serra would perform poorly in the northeast, and believed that Jereissati would do better in the region owing to being from Ceará.

In addition to Serra and Jereissati, who were the subject of most speculation, other potential PSDB candidates were speculated on, including members of the Cardoso administration. Economist and education official Paulo Renato Souza, who served as Cardoso's Minister of Education, was occasionally mentioned as a potential PSDB candidate, though he declined to run. Pedro Malan, an economist who served as Minister of Finance under Cardoso, was also the subject of some 2002 speculation, though he similarly chose not to contest the election for the PSDB.

Both Governor of São Paulo Geraldo Alckmin and President of the Chamber of Deputies Aécio Neves were also the subject of some media speculation, though neither entered the race; Alckmin would later represent the PSDB in the 2006 and 2018 presidential elections, while Neves would be the party's presidential candidate in 2014.

=== Workers' Party ===
Luiz Inácio Lula da Silva, known as Lula, was a fixture of the Brazilian Left going into the 2002 election. Well-known for his role in the 1980 steelworkers' strike, the former labor leader and federal deputy for São Paulo served as the PT's presidential candidate in 1989, 1994, and 1998. Nevertheless, Lula faced some opposition within his own party, who felt that he shouldn't lead the party after losing the past three presidential elections. Senator Eduardo Suplicy of São Paulo contested the nomination for as the candidacy of the PT. Suplicy was well-known for being an early supporter of a universal basic income, and party leadership encouraged his participation in the party's preliminary election to mobilize and unite the party's base. Suplicy would lose to Lula with just over 15% of the preliminary vote. During the campaign, Suplicy accused party leadership of favoring Lula, publicly demanding that pro-Lula party president José Dirceu be impartial in the election. Former Governor of the Federal District Cristovam Buarque was named as a possible centrist challenger to Lula in the PT preliminary election. Buarque, who had supported Democratic Labour Party (PDT) candidate Leonel Brizola rather than Lula in the 1989 presidential election, was known for his independence from party leadership. A member of the party's moderate wing, he was an early supporter of PT moving to the political centre, advocating for privatization of some state industries. Buarque ended up not running for President, and would join Lula's administration as Minister of Education in 2003, before leaving the party altogether and running for president in the 2006 election under the PDT.

On the other hand, some members of the party's left-wing who felt Lula that was too moderate urged Mayor of Belém Edmilson Rodrigues to contest the party' nomination. Edmilson did not end up running for the party's nomination, and would later leave the party to join the left-wing Socialism and Liberty Party (PSOL).

==== Results ====
| Candidate | Votes | % |
|---|---|---|
| Luiz Inácio Lula da Silva | 136,492 | 84.42 |
| Eduardo Suplicy | 25,199 | 15.58 |
| Total | 161,691 | 100.00 |
| Valid votes | 161,691 | 97.99 |
| Invalid votes | 1,022 | 0.62 |
| Blank votes | 2,301 | 1.39 |
| Total votes | 165,014 | 100.00 |
| Registered voters/turnout | 800,000 | 20.63 |
Source: PT Notícias

Lula won all states handily. His best performance was in Ceará, with 95.4% of the popular vote, while his worst was in São Paulo (where Suplicy represented in the Senate), earning 76.5% of the popular vote there. Lula generally recorded his best results in the Northeast and North regions, while Suplicy tended to overperform in the South, Southeast and Central West regions.

The primary election had higher-than-expected turnout, with around 170 thousand party members voting. Turnout percentage exceeded 15%, the quorum for which the election results are validated.

== Presidential candidates ==
=== Candidates in the runoff ===
| Party | Candidate | Most relevant political office or occupation | Party | Running mate | Coalition | Electoral number |
|---|---|---|---|---|---|---|
| Workers' Party (PT) | Luiz Inácio Lula da Silva | Member of the Chamber of Deputies from São Paulo (1987–1991) | Liberal Party (PL) | José Alencar | Lula President (Note: Unofficially supporting parties: Green Party (PV) and Brazilian Democratic Movement Party (PMDB) in some states. Support in the second round: Popular Socialist Party (PPS), Democratic Labour Party (PDT), Brazilian Labour Party (PTB), Workers' General Party (PGT), Brazilian Socialist Party (PSB), Social Christian Party (PSC), Christian Labour Party (PTC) and Humanist Party of Solidarity (PHS).): Workers' Party (PT); Liberal Party (PL); Communist Party of Brazil (PCdoB); Party of National Mobilization (PMN); Brazilian Communist Party (PCB) | 13 |
| Brazilian Social Democracy Party (PSDB) | José Serra | Minister of Health of Brazil (1998–2002) | Brazilian Democratic Movement Party (PMDB) | Rita Camata | Great Alliance (Note: Supporting parties in the second round: Liberal Front Party (PFL), Brazilian Progressive Party (PPB), Social Liberal Party (PSL), National Labour Party (PTN), Christian Social Democratic Party (PSDC), Brazilian Labour Renewal Party (PRTB), Social Democratic Party (PSD), Progressive Republican Party (PRP), Party of the Nation's Retirees (PAN) and Labour Party of Brazil (PTdoB).): Brazilian Social Democracy Party (PSDB); Brazilian Democratic Movement Party (PMDB) | 45 |

=== Candidates failing to make the runoff ===
| Party | Candidate | Most relevant political office or occupation | Party | Running mate | Coalition | Electoral number |
|---|---|---|---|---|---|---|
| United Socialist Workers' Party (PSTU) | José Maria de Almeida | PSTU National President (since 1993) | United Socialist Workers' Party (PSTU) | Dayse Oliveira | —N/a | 16 |
| Popular Socialist Party (PPS) | Ciro Gomes | Governor of Ceará (1991–1994) | Democratic Labour Party (PDT) | Paulo Pereira da Silva | Labour Front: Popular Socialist Party (PPS); Democratic Labour Party (PDT); Brazilian Labour Party (PTB) | 23 |
| Workers' Cause Party (PCO) | Rui Costa Pimenta | PCO National President (since 1995) | Workers' Cause Party (PCO) | Pedro Paulo de Abreu | —N/a | 29 |
| Brazilian Socialist Party (PSB) | Anthony Garotinho | Governor of Rio de Janeiro (1999–2002) | Brazilian Socialist Party (PSB) | José Antonio Almeida | Brazil Hope Front: Brazilian Socialist Party (PSB); Workers' General Party (PGT); Christian Labour Party (PTC) | 40 |

== Results ==
=== President ===
| Candidate | Running mate | Party | First round | | Second round | |
| Candidate | Running mate | Party | Votes | % | Votes | % |
|---|---|---|---|---|---|---|
| Luiz Inácio Lula da Silva | José Alencar (PL) | Workers' Party | 39,455,233 | 46.44 | 52,793,364 | 61.27 |
| José Serra | Rita Camata (PMDB) | Brazilian Social Democratic Party | 19,705,445 | 23.20 | 33,370,739 | 38.73 |
| Anthony Garotinho | José Antônio Figueiredo | Brazilian Socialist Party | 15,180,097 | 17.87 | | |
| Ciro Gomes | Paulo Pereira da Silva (PDT) | Popular Socialist Party | 10,170,882 | 11.97 | | |
| José Maria de Almeida | Dayse Oliveira | United Socialist Workers' Party | 402,236 | 0.47 | | |
| Rui Costa Pimenta | Pedro Paulo de Abreu | Workers' Cause Party | 38,619 | 0.05 | | |
| Total | | | 84,952,512 | 100.00 | 86,164,103 | 100.00 |
| Valid votes | | | 84,952,512 | 89.61 | 86,164,103 | 94.00 |
| Invalid votes | | | 6,976,685 | 7.36 | 3,772,138 | 4.12 |
| Blank votes | | | 2,873,753 | 3.03 | 1,727,760 | 1.88 |
| Total votes | | | 94,802,950 | 100.00 | 91,664,001 | 100.00 |
| Registered voters/turnout | | | 115,253,816 | 82.26 | 115,253,816 | 79.53 |
Source: Election Resources

=== Chamber of Deputies ===
| Party | Votes | % | Seats | +/– |
|---|---|---|---|---|
| Workers' Party | 16,094,080 | 18.40 | 91 | +33 |
| Brazilian Social Democracy Party | 12,473,743 | 14.26 | 70 | –29 |
| Liberal Front Party | 11,706,253 | 13.38 | 84 | –21 |
| Brazilian Democratic Movement Party | 11,691,526 | 13.37 | 76 | –7 |
| Brazilian Progressive Party | 6,828,375 | 7.81 | 48 | –12 |
| Brazilian Socialist Party | 4,616,674 | 5.28 | 22 | +3 |
| Democratic Labour Party | 4,482,538 | 5.12 | 21 | –4 |
| Brazilian Labour Party | 4,052,111 | 4.63 | 26 | –5 |
| Liberal Party | 3,780,930 | 4.32 | 26 | +14 |
| Popular Socialist Party | 2,682,487 | 3.07 | 15 | +12 |
| Communist Party of Brazil | 1,967,847 | 2.25 | 12 | +5 |
| Party of the Reconstruction of the National Order | 1,804,655 | 2.06 | 6 | +5 |
| Green Party | 1,179,374 | 1.35 | 5 | +5 |
| Social Christian Party | 504,611 | 0.58 | 1 | –2 |
| Social Labour Party | 504,044 | 0.58 | 3 | +2 |
| Social Democratic Party | 452,386 | 0.52 | 4 | +1 |
| Social Liberal Party | 408,512 | 0.47 | 1 | 0 |
| Brazilian Labour Renewal Party | 304,092 | 0.35 | 0 | 0 |
| Humanist Party of Solidarity | 294,928 | 0.34 | 0 | 0 |
| Party of National Mobilization | 282,878 | 0.32 | 1 | –1 |
| Progressive Republican Party | 251,971 | 0.29 | 0 | 0 |
| Workers' General Party | 194,686 | 0.22 | 0 | 0 |
| Christian Social Democratic Party | 192,546 | 0.22 | 1 | +1 |
| Labour Party of Brazil | 168,639 | 0.19 | 0 | 0 |
| United Socialist Workers' Party | 159,251 | 0.18 | 0 | 0 |
| Party of the Nation's Retirees | 126,666 | 0.14 | 0 | 0 |
| National Labour Party | 118,471 | 0.14 | 0 | 0 |
| Christian Labour Party | 74,955 | 0.09 | 0 | 0 |
| Brazilian Communist Party | 45,963 | 0.05 | 0 | 0 |
| Workers' Cause Party | 29,351 | 0.03 | 0 | 0 |
| Total | 87,474,543 | 100.00 | 513 | 0 |
| Valid votes | 87,474,543 | 92.31 | | |
| Invalid votes | 2,811,943 | 2.97 | | |
| Blank votes | 4,476,906 | 4.72 | | |
| Total votes | 94,763,392 | 100.00 | | |
| Registered voters/turnout | 115,184,176 | 82.27 | | |
Source: Election Resources

=== Senate ===
| Party | Votes | % | Seats | | |
| Party | Votes | % | Won | Total | +/– |
|---|---|---|---|---|---|
| Workers' Party | 33,853,150 | 22.03 | 10 | 14 | +7 |
| Liberal Front Party | 28,408,415 | 18.49 | 14 | 19 | –1 |
| Brazilian Democratic Movement Party | 25,199,662 | 16.40 | 9 | 19 | –7 |
| Brazilian Social Democracy Party | 21,360,291 | 13.90 | 8 | 11 | –5 |
| Democratic Labour Party | 7,932,624 | 5.16 | 4 | 5 | +1 |
| Brazilian Progressive Party | 6,903,581 | 4.49 | 0 | 1 | –2 |
| Communist Party of Brazil | 6,199,237 | 4.03 | 0 | 0 | 0 |
| Brazilian Labour Party | 5,190,032 | 3.38 | 2 | 3 | +2 |
| Liberal Party | 4,857,302 | 3.16 | 2 | 3 | +3 |
| Popular Socialist Party | 4,720,408 | 3.07 | 1 | 1 | 0 |
| Brazilian Socialist Party | 3,389,139 | 2.21 | 3 | 4 | +1 |
| Social Democratic Party | 1,151,901 | 0.75 | 1 | 1 | +1 |
| Social Labour Party | 1,129,186 | 0.73 | 0 | 0 | 0 |
| Green Party | 962,719 | 0.63 | 0 | 0 | 0 |
| United Socialist Workers' Party | 490,251 | 0.32 | 0 | 0 | 0 |
| Party of National Mobilization | 358,062 | 0.23 | 0 | 0 | 0 |
| Social Liberal Party | 295,807 | 0.19 | 0 | 0 | 0 |
| Social Christian Party | 293,463 | 0.19 | 0 | 0 | 0 |
| Workers' Cause Party | 194,112 | 0.13 | 0 | 0 | 0 |
| Party of the Reconstruction of the National Order | 145,016 | 0.09 | 0 | 0 | 0 |
| National Labour Party | 107,122 | 0.07 | 0 | 0 | 0 |
| Workers' General Party | 103,973 | 0.07 | 0 | 0 | 0 |
| Brazilian Communist Party | 95,489 | 0.06 | 0 | 0 | 0 |
| Progressive Republican Party | 90,502 | 0.06 | 0 | 0 | 0 |
| Party of the Nation's Retirees | 76,798 | 0.05 | 0 | 0 | 0 |
| Humanist Party of Solidarity | 76,274 | 0.05 | 0 | 0 | 0 |
| Christian Social Democratic Party | 29,768 | 0.02 | 0 | 0 | 0 |
| Brazilian Labour Renewal Party | 27,301 | 0.02 | 0 | 0 | 0 |
| Labour Party of Brazil | 19,175 | 0.01 | 0 | 0 | 0 |
| Christian Labour Party | 3,784 | 0.00 | 0 | 0 | 0 |
| Total | 153,664,544 | 100.00 | 54 | 81 | 0 |
| Valid votes | 153,664,544 | 81.08 | | | |
| Invalid votes | 22,547,411 | 11.90 | | | |
| Blank votes | 13,316,709 | 7.03 | | | |
| Total votes | 189,528,664 | 100.00 | | | |
| Registered voters/turnout | 115,184,176 | 164.54 | | | |
Source: Election Resources, IPU
