= Act (Brazil) =

Act Agir
- President: Daniel Tourinho
- General Secretary: Paulo Victor
- Vice President: Diego Tourinho
- Founded: 11 July 1985
- Registered: 22 February 1990
- Split from: PDT
- Headquarters: Brasília, Federal District
- Youth wing: Agir36 Jovem
- Women's wing: Agir36 Mulher
- LGBT+ wing: Agir36 LGBTQIA+
- Membership (2023): ▼191.744
- Ideology: Autistic people's interests; Historical: Conservatism; Christian democracy; Economic liberalism; During Collor's Presidency: Conservatism; Reformism; Neoliberalism; Neopopulism; Economic liberalism; Pro-free markets; Social liberalism; Democratic capitalism; Social capitalism; Keynesianism; Anti-Third Way
- Political position: Centre; Historical: Right-wing
- Colors: Navy blue Celtic blue
- Slogan: "It's time to ACT!"
- Party number: 36
- Legislative Assemblies: 3 / 1,024
- Mayors: 1 / 5,568
- Municipal Chambers: 218 / 58,208

Website
- agir36.com.br

Agir ([aˈʒiɾ], lit. 'Act') is a political party in Brazil, established in 1985. It was founded as the Youth Party (Portuguese: Partido da Juventude; PJ), and was renamed the National Reconstruction Party (Portuguese: Partido da Reconstrução Nacional, PRN) in 1989, and the Christian Labor Party (Portuguese: Partido Trabalhista Cristão, PTC) in 2000. The party was renamed Agir in 2021, a change ratified by the Superior Electoral Court the following year.

As the National Reconstruction Party, it had the first president chosen through direct elections after the end of Brazil's military dictatorship, Fernando Collor de Mello along with a bloc of 40 federal deputies and 2 senators in 1990. However, the impeachment of Fernando Collor in 1992 had a devastating effect on the party's image, and the PRN lost the majority of its deputies, along with members and electorate. In 2000, the party attempted a rebranding process, changing its name to the Christian Labor Party (PTC) and declaring itself aligned with Christian democracy. Nevertheless, it maintained a limited presence in the national electoral arena. In 2023, after renaming to Agir, the party ideologically restructured itself to focus on promoting the rights and well-being of autistic people.

== History ==
PRN logo from 1989 to 2000

The party was founded in 1985 as the Youth Party by lawyer Daniel Sampaio Tourinho, a former member of the Democratic Labor Party. In 1989, it was renamed the National Reconstruction Party. In the same year, it succeeded in having its candidate, Fernando Collor de Mello, elected to the presidency of Brazil with 53.03% of the total votes.

The party carried out a platform of encouraging free trade, opening Brazil's market to imports, privatizing state-run companies, and attempting to reduce the country's rampant hyperinflation by way of the Plano Collor, which significantly reduced inflation rates in 1991, but was followed by a renewed and persistent, though smaller uptick in 1992. Following the impeachment of Fernando Collor for corruption and influence peddling charges in 1992, the party suffered a deep confidence crisis, losing most of its parliamentary representation.

PTC logo from 2000 to 2021

In the 1994 presidential election, the party launched the candidacy of Carlos Antônio Gomes, who came second to last with 0.61% of the total votes. In 1998, while still affiliated with the party, Collor tried to run in that year's presidential election. The Superior Electoral Court prevented him from doing so, as he had been ineligible for eight years since his impeachment in 1992. In 2000, the party was renamed the Christian Labor Party.

In 2016, Collor, now a Senator from Alagoas, returned to the party, remaining with it for three years until 2019, when he joined the Republican Party of the Social Order.

On 5 October 2021, during an event in Brasilia, it was announced that the party would be renamed Agir. The Superior Electoral Court ratified this decision the next year.

In 2023, the party underwent a total ideological reform, shifting to focus on promoting the rights and well-being of autistic people.

== Election results ==
=== Presidential elections ===
Election	Candidate	Running mate	Coalition	First round		Second round		Result
Election	Candidate	Running mate	Coalition	Votes	%	Votes	%	Result
1989	Fernando Collor (PRN)	Itamar Franco (PRN)	New Brazil Movement (PRN, PSC, PST, PTR)	20,611,011	30.48% (1st)	35,089,998	53.03% (1st)	Elected ✓
1994	Carlos Antônio Gomes (PRN)	Dilton Carlos Salomoni (PRN)	None	387,738	0.61% (7th)	—		Lost ✗
2002	Anthony Garotinho (PSB)	José Antonio Almeida (PSB)	Brazil Hope Front (PSB, PGT, PTC)	15,180,097	17.87% (3rd)	—		Lost ✗
2010	Dilma Rousseff (PT)	Michel Temer (PMDB)	For Brazil to Keep on Changing (PT, PMDB, PCdoB, PR, PDT, PRB, PSC, PSB, PTC, PTN)	47,651,434	46.9% (1st)	55,752,529	56.1% (1st)	Elected ✓
2014	Aécio Neves (PSDB)	Aloysio Nunes (PSDB)	Change Brazil (PSDB, DEM, PMN, PEN, PTB, PTC, PTdoB, PTN, SD)	34,897,211	33.55% (2nd)	51,041,155	48.36% (2nd)	Lost ✗
2018	Alvaro Dias (PODE)	Paulo Rabello (PSC)	True Change (PODE, PSC, PRP, PTC)	859,601	0.8% (9th)	—		Lost ✗
2022	Lula da Silva (PT)	Geraldo Alckmin (PSB)	Brazil of Hope (FE Brasil, PSB, Agir, Avante, PSOL-REDE, PROS, Solidariedade)	57,259,504	48.4% (1st)	60,345,999	50.9% (1st)	Elected ✓
2026	Augusto Cury (Avante)	Júlio Delgado (Avante)	Brazil of Our Dreams (Avante, Agir)	3,448,569	2.89% (3rd)	—		Lost ✗

=== Legislative elections ===
Election	Chamber of Deputies				Federal Senate			
Election	Votes	%	Seats	+/–	Votes	%	Seats	+/–
1986	19,048	0.04%	0 / 487	New	?	?	0 / 75	New
1990	3,357,091	8.29%	40 / 503	▲40	?	?	2 / 81	▲2
1994	184,727	0.4%	1 / 513	▼39	1,628,491	1.70%	0 / 81	▼2
1998	54,641	0.08%	0 / 513	▼1	99,077	0.16%	0 / 81	0
2002	74,955	0.09%	0 / 513	0	3,784	0.00%	0 / 81	0
2006	806,662	0.87%	4 / 513	▲4	39,690	0.05%	0 / 81	0
2010	595,431	0.62%	1 / 513	▼3	282,629	0.17%	0 / 81	0
2014	338,117	0.35%	2 / 513	▲1	21,993	0.02%	0 / 81	0
2018	601,814	0.61%	2 / 513	0	222,931	0.13%	1 / 81	▲1
2022	158,868	0.15%	0 / 513	▼2	24,076	0.02%	0 / 81	▼1
2026	7,155	0.01%	0 / 513	0	23,881	0.01%	0 / 81	0

== Notes ==
Preceded by 35 – Democrat (Democrata)	Numbers of Brazilian Official Political Parties; 36 – Act (Agir)	Succeeded by 40 – BSP (PSB)
