= 2006 Brazilian general election =

- Presidential election
- 1 October 2006 (first round); 29 October 2006 (second round)
- Turnout: 83.25% (first round, ▲0.99 pp); 81.01% (second round, ▲1.48 pp)

| Candidate | Lula da Silva | Geraldo Alckmin |
| Party | PT | PSDB |
| Alliance | Strength of the People | For a Decent Brazil |
| Running mate | José Alencar (PRB) | José Jorge (PFL) |
| Popular vote | 58,295,042 | 37,543,178 |
| Percentage | 60.83% | 39.17% |
President before election
Lula da Silva
PT
Elected President
Lula da Silva
PT
- Chamber of Deputies election
- 1 October 2006
- All 513 seats in the Chamber of Deputies; 257 seats needed for a majority
| Party | Leader | Vote % | Seats | +/– |
|---|---|---|---|---|
| PT | Ricardo Berzoini | 15.01 | 83 | −8 |
| PMDB | Michel Temer | 14.57 | 89 | +15 |
| PSDB | Tasso Jereissati | 13.62 | 65 | −6 |
| PFL | Jorge Bornhausen | 10.93 | 65 | −19 |
| PP | | 7.15 | 42 | −7 |
| PSB | Roberto Amaral | 6.15 | 27 | +5 |
| PDT | Carlos Lupi | 5.21 | 24 | +3 |
| PTB | Roberto Jefferson | 4.72 | 22 | −4 |
| PL | Valdemar Costa Neto | 4.37 | 23 | −3 |
| PPS | | 3.90 | 21 | +6 |
| PV | José Luiz Penna | 3.61 | 13 | +8 |
| PCdoB | | 2.13 | 13 | +1 |
| PSC | | 1.88 | 9 | +8 |
| PSOL | Heloísa Helena | 1.23 | 3 | New |
| PRONA | Enéas Carneiro | 0.97 | 2 | −4 |
| PMN | | 0.94 | 3 | +2 |
| PTC | Daniel Tourinho | 0.87 | 4 | +4 |
| PHS | | 0.47 | 2 | +2 |
| PTdoB | Luis Tibé | 0.33 | 1 | +1 |
| PAN | | 0.28 | 1 | +1 |
| PRB | | 0.26 | 1 | New |
This lists parties that won seats. See the complete results below.
- Senate election
- 1 October 2006
- 27 of the 81 seats in the Senate
| Party | Leader | Vote % | Seats | +/– |
|---|---|---|---|---|
| PFL | Jorge Bornhausen | 25.66 | 18 | −1 |
| PT | Ricardo Berzoini | 19.22 | 10 | −4 |
| PSDB | Tasso Jereissati | 12.50 | 14 | +3 |
| PMDB | Michel Temer | 12.03 | 16 | −3 |
| PCdoB | | 7.54 | 2 | +2 |
| PDT | Carlos Lupi | 5.95 | 5 | 0 |
| PP | | 5.01 | 1 | 0 |
| PTB | Roberto Jefferson | 3.17 | 4 | +1 |
| PSB | Roberto Amaral | 2.54 | 3 | −1 |
| PPS | | 1.46 | 1 | 0 |
| PL | Valdemar Costa Neto | 0.83 | 3 | 0 |
| PRTB | Levy Fidelix | 0.76 | 1 | +1 |
| PSOL | Heloísa Helena | 0.42 | 1 | New |
| PRB | | 0.31 | 2 | New |
This lists parties that won seats. See the complete results below.

General elections were held in Brazil on 1 October 2006 to elect the president, National Congress and state governors, with a second round of the presidential election on 29 October as no candidate received more than 50% of the vote in the first round.

Elected by a wide margin in the 2002 presidential elections, incumbent Luiz Inácio Lula da Silva of the centre-left Workers' Party (PT) ran for reelection. During his first term in office, Lula implemented a wide array of social programs, including the Fome Zero (Zero Hunger) and Bolsa Família (Family Allowance) programs. The programs were credited for a historic 27.7% drop in the poverty rate during Lula's first term in office. However, the Mensalão scandal, a corruption scandal that implicated politicians in the PT and other parties, briefly caused a decline in Lula's popularity in the year prior to the election. As he did in 2002, Lula would choose centre-right Vice President José Alencar of the Brazilian Republican Party (PRB) as his running mate, despite rumors he would choose a Brazilian Democratic Movement (PMDB) member. During his presidential campaign Lula performed best among working-class voters.

The Brazilian Social Democracy Party (PSDB), the dominant centre-right force in Brazilian politics and the PT's main rival at the national level, chose former Governor of São Paulo Geraldo Alckmin as the party's presidential nominee. Closely affiliated with the Brazilian business establishment, Alckmin was very popular as Governor of São Paulo, a stronghold of the PSDB. During his presidential campaign, Alckmin pushed for tax cuts, and he performed best among wealthy voters, while trailing in the working-class vote to Lula. To expand his coalition, Alckmin chose Senator José Jorge of Pernambuco, a member of the centre-right Liberal Front Party (PFL), as his running mate.

Though Lula was expected to win in the first round with a large majority, the President unexpectedly received 48.7% to Alckmin's 41.6%, mandating the need for a second round. This was partially attributed to a late breaking scandal in 2006 known as Dossiergate which involved PT leadership, which allowed Alckmin to surge significantly in the weeks prior to the runoff. Nonetheless, Lula won in a landslide in the second round, with Alckmin garnering a lower vote percentage than he did in the first round. In 2007, Lula would take office for the second time as President of Brazil.

In 2022, Lula would be elected to a third term with Alckmin (who lost to Lula in this election) as his running mate. They were sworn in as president and vice-president respectively on 1 January 2023, and were both re-elected in 2026.

== Background ==
The 2006 election was held amid a clear reorganization of the political forces of the country. After three failed attempts, Workers' Party candidate Luiz Inácio Lula da Silva was eventually elected president. The financial market feared his government would be a threat to the new-found economic stability. Lula, once considered a member of the radical left wing, implemented unorthodox neoliberal policies on the economic field, resembling the Fernando Henrique Cardoso administration, but not succumbing, however, to privatization pressures. On the social field, Lula gained notice for Fome Zero, a successful measure to eradicate extreme poverty. Cardoso was mentioned as a potential candidate in 2006.

The Workers' Party was, thus, deemed less socialist and more social democratic. As the party moved deeper into the centre-left spectrum, allying with centrist Brazilian Democratic Movement Party, a series of complaints were made by members of its far left factions, which accused it of betraying its ideals and founding charter. Despite the discredit of the Workers' Party among traditional leftists, they strongly supported Lula as the real left wing alternative. The Brazilian Communist Party, for instance, supported Lula on the second round, unlike its presidential candidate Heloísa Helena, informing its members of the alleged regression Geraldo Alckmin would represent if elected.

Two former members of the Workers' Party, Cristovam Buarque and Heloísa Helena, launched their candidacies as "alternative left" candidates for the Democratic Labour Party and the Socialism and Liberty Party, respectively. They once discussed the possibility of forming a coalition themselves. Both parties were criticised by the left on the second round for not supporting Lula.

The campaign for void voting reached its peak on the 2006 election, with MTV Brasil (unlike its American branch, which advocates voting initiatives like Rock the Vote among younger audiences) becoming the first TV network to officially support it.

== Electoral system ==
The 2006 elections were the last marked by the now extinct "verticalization rule", that forced parties to ally on the state level with the same parties for which they were allied nationwide. This rule was introduced at the 2002 general elections by the Supreme Electoral Court.

== Workers' Party vice-presidential selection ==
In 2002, the ability of Luiz Inácio Lula da Silva, known as Lula, to finally get elected after three previous attempts. The choice of millionaire businessman José Alencar, then a member of the Liberal Party (PL), was partially credited as a reason for his victory. Alencar was widely known and respected as a self-made man in industrial circles and his choice signaled that Lula was not going to transform the country into a full-fledged socialist economy.

Nevertheless, going into the 2006 presidential election, Lula considered replacing Alencar in favor of a different running mate. Indeed, one report by Folha de S.Paulo in 2006 stated that it was "incredibly unlikely" that Alencar would be chosen again. Though Lula and Alencar became close friends in office, even being described as "brothers" in spite of their political differences, there was speculation that Lula would choose a running mate from the Brazilian Democratic Movement Party (PMDB). The centrist PMDB was considered to be a kingmaker in the National Congress and Lula sought to keep the powerful party in his governing bloc.

PMBD leaders mentioned as possible running mates for Lula include: Renan Calheiros, a senator from Alagoas considered to be a member of the pro-Lula wing of the party; Germano Rigotto, the neoliberal governor of Rio Grande do Sul; Jarbas Vasconcelos, the governor of Pernambuco and critic of Lula; Helio Costa, who was serving in Lula's government as minister of communications at the time.

== Presidential candidates ==
=== Candidates in runoff ===
| Party | Candidate | Most relevant political office or occupation | Party | Running mate | Coalition | Electoral number |
|---|---|---|---|---|---|---|
| Workers' Party (PT) | Luiz Inácio Lula da Silva | President of Brazil (2003–2011) | Brazilian Republican Party (PRB) | José Alencar | The Strength of the People (Note: Unofficially supporting parties: Liberal Party (PL) and Brazilian Socialist Party (PSB).): Workers' Party (PT); Communist Party of Brazil (PCdoB); Brazilian Republican Party (PRB) | 13 |
| Brazilian Social Democracy Party (PSDB) | Geraldo Alckmin | Governor of São Paulo (2001–2006) | Liberal Front Party (PFL) | José Jorge | For a Decent Brazil (Note: Unofficially supporting party: Popular Socialist Party (PPS).): Brazilian Social Democracy Party (PSDB); Liberal Front Party (PFL) | 45 |

=== Candidates failing to make runoff ===
| Party | Candidate | Most relevant political office or occupation | Party | Running mate | Coalition | Electoral number |
|---|---|---|---|---|---|---|
| Democratic Labour Party (PDT) | Cristovam Buarque | Senator for the Federal District (2003–2019) | Democratic Labour Party (PDT) | Jefferson Peres | —N/a | 12 |
| Social Liberal Party (PSL) | Luciano Bivar | Member of the Chamber of Deputies from Pernambuco (1999–2003) | Social Liberal Party (PSL) | Américo de Souza | —N/a | 17 |
| Christian Social Democratic Party (PSDC) | José Maria Eymael | Member of the Chamber of Deputies from São Paulo (1987–1995) | Christian Social Democratic Party (PSDC) | José Paulo Neto | —N/a | 27 |
| Progressive Republican Party (PRP) | Ana Maria Rangel | Businesswoman and political scientist | Progressive Republican Party (PRP) | Delma Gama e Narcini | —N/a | 44 |
| Socialism and Liberty Party (PSOL) | Heloísa Helena | Senator for Alagoas (1999–2007) | Socialism and Liberty Party (PSOL) | César Benjamin | Left-Wing Front: Socialism and Liberty Party (PSOL); Brazilian Communist Party (PCB); United Socialist Workers' Party (PSTU) | 50 |

=== Denied candidacy ===
| Party | Candidate | Most relevant political office or occupation | Party | Running mate | Coalition | Electoral number |
|---|---|---|---|---|---|---|
| Workers' Cause Party (PCO) | Rui Costa Pimenta | PCO National President (since 1995) | Workers' Cause Party (PCO) | Pedro Paulo de Abreu | —N/a | 29 |

== Campaign ==
Starting from the end of 2005, the most discussed issues about the 2006 national elections involved the country's four biggest parties: PFL, PMDB, PSDB and PT.

President Luiz Inácio Lula da Silva (PT) ran for reelection , but he did not confirm his candidacy until June 2006. This was regarded as a cautious move in case something major happened on the political spectrum that could harm his candidacy, especially regarding the 2005 political scandal, still under investigation.

At the end of 2005, several names were regarded in the PSDB as potential candidates for the presidential elections, such as former president Fernando Henrique Cardoso, senator Tasso Jereissati, Minas Gerais governor Aécio Neves, São Paulo governor Geraldo Alckmin and São Paulo mayor José Serra. By the beginning of 2006, Alckmin and Serra were considered the only two actual potential candidates, and the other three would choose between them (or determine a way by which the choice would be made). Geraldo Alckmin was the chosen candidate, whereas Serra is running for governor of São Paulo.

The PFL was planning the candidacy of Rio de Janeiro mayor César Maia. Another possibility was to appoint the vice-president nominee for PSDB presidential candidate. Maia initially said he would agree with the latter only if the presidential candidate was José Serra, but later accepted the possibility of the party appointing a name to run with Geraldo Alckmin, which was eventually senator José Jorge.

In the PMDB there was division. Some, including party president Michel Temer, wanted the party to have a candidate of its own for the presidential race, and scheduled primaries within the party, with two prospective candidates: former Rio de Janeiro governor Anthony Garotinho and Rio Grande do Sul governor Germano Rigotto. Another section of the party, though, wished to ally with president Lula and appoint the vice-president nominee to run with him. This "governist part" of the party was headed by senators Renan Calheiros and José Sarney. There was also a third possibility of making an alliance with PSDB. The PMDB decided not to take any part in the presidential elections and became free to make any coalition in the states.

Aside from these four parties, the smaller ones had no clear course of action. The PSOL was the first to appoint a candidate, senator Heloisa Helena.

The three main candidates were later joined by Cristóvam Buarque (PDT), Luciano Bivar (PSL), José Maria Eymael (PSDC) and Rui Costa Pimenta (PCO). Ana Maria Rangel (PRP), who also registered her candidacy, was ruled out after internal disagreements with her own party, but was able to revert the situation and regain her right to participate in the presidential race.

The first debate took part on 14 August, featuring Heloisa Helena, Cristóvam Buarque, Luciano Bivar and José Maria Eymael. Lula refused to participate, whereas Rui Costa Pimenta was not invited.

On 15 August, the official electoral programmes started being aired on television and radio. Every weekday, all candidates have a few prime-time minutes to put forward their ideas and plans. The time allocated to each one is loosely based on the number of Congress representatives each coalition has.

Also on 15 August, the Supreme Electoral Court decided to revoke the registration of the PCO candidate, Rui Costa Pimenta. The court ruling was based on the fact that the party had not presented its accounts for the 2002 general elections within the deadline specified by law. Pimenta, however, managed to retain his candidacy: the matter is pending decision.

Polls varied little in the two months prior to the election, showing Lula with over 50% of the valid votes, followed by Alckmin, Heloisa Helena, and Buarque. Nevertheless, the difference between Lula's figures and the sum of his opponents' shortened on the eve of the election.

On 28 September, the PT candidate refused to appear at a debate hosted by Globo TV. Explaining his decision in a letter addressed to the TV station, Lula claimed that all his opponents would take the opportunity to team up and attack him. Three days before the election, the last debate was expected to have a large audience.

On 1 October the first round ended with no winner. Lula led the field with 48.6 percent of the vote. Although he came just a few thousand votes short of a first-round victory, his vote share was roughly 1% less of the other candidates' combined total. This forced him into a run-off with Alckmin, who placed second.

=== Run-off ===
Despite being absent of the first-round debates, Lula faced Alckmin in four debates in the second round, each one of them aired by one of the four most important television channels in Brazil - Band, SBT, Record and two days before the election, on Globo TV.

Since the first debate, Alckmin accused Lula of being lenient with the members of his government who had to resign after being charged in many scandals since 2005. Also he tried to underestimate the achievements the president claimed to obtain during his term, like reducing of poverty and inflation rates, claiming his results were consequence of the favorable international economic scenario and the achievements of his antecessor Fernando Henrique Cardoso, from Alckmin's party.

Lula however claimed that despite his government is under investigation, both Cardoso and Alckmin halted many investigations on their administrations with dubious methods. According to analysts, Lula dealt damage to Alckmin most when he accused him of threatening the Bolsa Família program, which attends millions of low-income Brazilian families, and questioning the privatizations done during the Cardoso government claiming that most of them were unnecessary and the state companies in question were sold for sums much lower than their true market value, like the Vale do Rio Doce, sold by R$3.3 billion at the time, but now profits this same amount in a quarter of year. Also he claimed that there would be no guarantee that other companies could be sold like state oil giant Petrobras, the country's largest and most profitable company, in case of Alckmin's victory.

Whether the formula worked or not, Lula's poll numbers increased sharply and he was elected for a second term as president by a 20 million vote margin, while Alckmin received fewer votes than in the first round. Despite this, Alckmin won seven states Lula had carried in 2002 (Amapá, Mato Grosso, Mato Grosso do Sul, Paraná, Rio Grande do Sul, Santa Catarina and São Paulo) while Lula won Alagoas, the only state to vote against him in 2002.

== Debates ==
2006 Brazilian presidential election debates
| No. | Date and location | Hosts | Moderators | Participants | | | | | | |
| Key: P Present A Absent N Not invited | | | | PT | PSDB | PDT | PSOL | PSDC | PSL | PRP |
| Key: P Present A Absent N Not invited | | | | Lula | Alckmin | Buarque | Helena | Eymael | Bivar | Rangel |
|---|---|---|---|---|---|---|---|---|---|---|
| 1.1 | Monday, 14 August 2006; São Paulo | Band TV, BandNews TV, BandNews FM, Rádio Bandeirantes | Ricardo Boechat | A | P | P | P | P | P | N |
| 1.2 | Thursday, 14 September 2006; São Paulo | TV Gazeta | Maria Lydia Flândoli | A | P | P | P | N | N | N |
| 1.3 | Thursday, 28 September 2006; Rio de Janeiro | TV Globo | William Bonner | A | P | P | P | N | N | N |
| 2.1 | Sunday, 8 October 2006; São Paulo | Band TV, BandNews TV, BandNews FM, Rádio Bandeirantes | Ricardo Boechat | P | P | Out | | | | |
| 2.2 | Tuesday, 17 October 2006; São Paulo | TV Gazeta | Maria Lydia Flândoli | Cancelled | | Out | | | | |
| 2.3 | Thursday, 19 October 2006; Osasco | SBT | Ana Paula Padrão | P | P | Out | | | | |
| 2.4 | Tuesday, 23 October 2006; São Paulo | RecordTV | Celso Freitas | P | P | Out | | | | |
| 2.5 | Wednesday, 27 October 2006; Rio de Janeiro | TV Globo, G1 | William Bonner | P | P | Out | | | | |

== Results ==
=== President ===
| Candidate | Running mate | Party | First round | | Second round | |
| Candidate | Running mate | Party | Votes | % | Votes | % |
|---|---|---|---|---|---|---|
| Luiz Inácio Lula da Silva | José Alencar (PRB) | Workers' Party | 46,662,365 | 48.61 | 58,295,042 | 60.83 |
| Geraldo Alckmin | José Jorge (PFL) | Brazilian Social Democracy Party | 39,968,369 | 41.64 | 37,543,178 | 39.17 |
| Heloísa Helena | César Benjamin | Socialism and Liberty Party | 6,575,393 | 6.85 | | |
| Cristovam Buarque | Jefferson Peres | Democratic Labour Party | 2,538,844 | 2.64 | | |
| Ana Maria Rangel | Delma Gama e Narcini | Progressive Republican Party | 126,404 | 0.13 | | |
| José Maria Eymael | José Paulo Nelo | Christian Social Democratic Party | 63,294 | 0.07 | | |
| Luciano Bivar | Américo de Souza | Social Liberal Party | 62,064 | 0.06 | | |
| Total | | | 95,996,733 | 100.00 | 95,838,220 | 100.00 |
| Valid votes | | | 95,996,733 | 91.58 | 95,838,220 | 93.96 |
| Invalid/blank votes | | | 8,823,726 | 8.42 | 6,160,001 | 6.04 |
| Total votes | | | 104,820,459 | 100.00 | 101,998,221 | 100.00 |
| Registered voters/turnout | | | 125,913,134 | 83.25 | 125,913,134 | 81.01 |
Source: Superior Electoral Court

==== Voter demographics ====
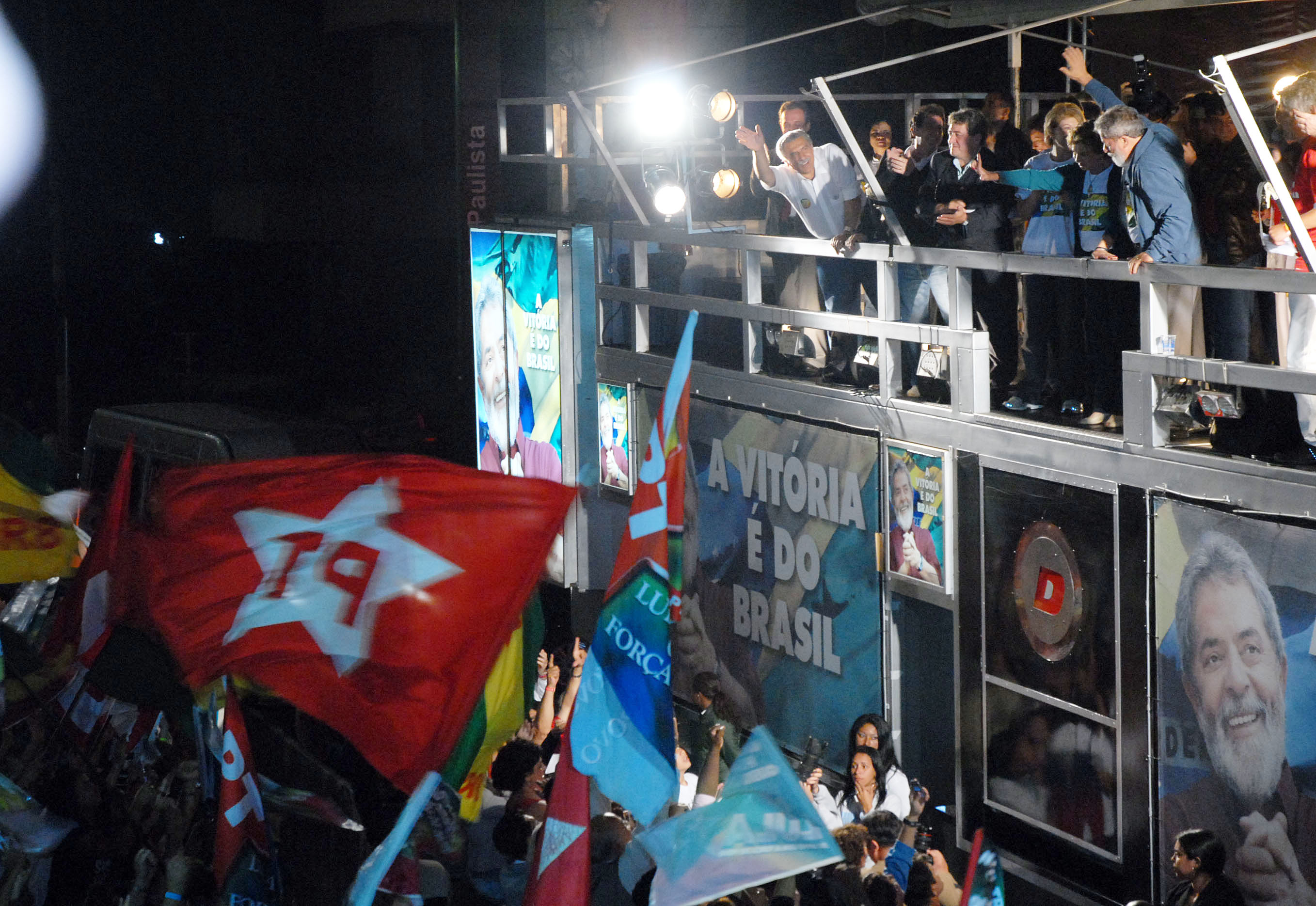
President Luiz Inácio Lula da Silva celebrating his electoral victory after the 2006 elections.

| Demographic group | Lula | Alckmin | Total |
|---|---|---|---|
| Total vote | 61 | 39 | 100 |
Gender
| Men | 64 | 36 | 48 |
| Women | 58 | 42 | 52 |
Age
| 16–24 years old | 60 | 40 | 18 |
| 25–34 years old | 63 | 37 | 24 |
| 35–44 years old | 61 | 39 | 20 |
| 45–59 years old | 61 | 39 | 23 |
| 60 and older | 61 | 39 | 15 |
Education
| Less than high school | 67 | 33 | 45 |
| High school diploma | 59 | 41 | 39 |
| Bachelor's degree or more | 47 | 53 | 16 |
Family income
| Under 2x min wage | 69 | 31 | 44 |
| 2-5x min wage | 59 | 41 | 36 |
| 5-10x min wage | 49 | 51 | 11 |
| Over 10x min wage | 44 | 56 | 9 |
Region
| Southeast | 57 | 43 | 45 |
| South | 48 | 52 | 16 |
| Northeast | 76 | 24 | 25 |
| North + Central-West | 61 | 39 | 14 |
Source: Datafolha

=== Chamber of Deputies ===
| Party | Votes | % | Seats | +/– |
|---|---|---|---|---|
| Workers' Party | 13,989,859 | 15.01 | 83 | –8 |
| Brazilian Democratic Movement Party | 13,580,517 | 14.57 | 89 | +15 |
| Brazilian Social Democracy Party | 12,691,043 | 13.62 | 65 | –6 |
| Liberal Front Party | 10,182,308 | 10.93 | 65 | –19 |
| Progressive Party | 6,662,309 | 7.15 | 42 | –7 |
| Brazilian Socialist Party | 5,732,464 | 6.15 | 27 | +5 |
| Democratic Labour Party | 4,854,017 | 5.21 | 24 | +3 |
| Brazilian Labour Party | 4,397,743 | 4.72 | 22 | –4 |
| Liberal Party | 4,074,618 | 4.37 | 23 | –3 |
| Popular Socialist Party | 3,630,462 | 3.90 | 21 | +6 |
| Green Party | 3,368,561 | 3.61 | 13 | +8 |
| Communist Party of Brazil | 1,982,323 | 2.13 | 13 | +1 |
| Social Christian Party | 1,747,863 | 1.88 | 9 | +8 |
| Socialism and Liberty Party | 1,149,619 | 1.23 | 3 | New |
| Party of the Reconstruction of the National Order | 907,494 | 0.97 | 2 | –4 |
| Party of National Mobilization | 875,686 | 0.94 | 3 | +2 |
| Christian Labour Party | 806,662 | 0.87 | 4 | +4 |
| Humanist Party of Solidarity | 435,328 | 0.47 | 2 | +2 |
| Christian Social Democratic Party | 354,217 | 0.38 | 0 | –1 |
| Labour Party of Brazil | 311,833 | 0.33 | 1 | +1 |
| Party of the Nation's Retirees | 264,682 | 0.28 | 1 | +1 |
| Brazilian Republican Party | 244,059 | 0.26 | 1 | New |
| Progressive Republican Party | 233,497 | 0.25 | 0 | 0 |
| Social Liberal Party | 190,793 | 0.20 | 0 | –1 |
| Brazilian Labour Renewal Party | 171,908 | 0.18 | 0 | 0 |
| National Labour Party | 149,809 | 0.16 | 0 | 0 |
| United Socialist Workers' Party | 101,307 | 0.11 | 0 | 0 |
| Brazilian Communist Party | 64,766 | 0.07 | 0 | 0 |
| Workers' Cause Party | 29,083 | 0.03 | 0 | 0 |
| Total | 93,184,830 | 100.00 | 513 | 0 |
| Valid votes | 93,184,830 | 88.93 | | |
| Invalid/blank votes | 11,593,921 | 11.07 | | |
| Total votes | 104,778,751 | 100.00 | | |
| Registered voters/turnout | 125,827,119 | 83.27 | | |
Source: Election Resources

=== Senate ===
| Party | Votes | % | Seats | | |
| Party | Votes | % | Won | Total | +/– |
|---|---|---|---|---|---|
| Liberal Front Party | 21,653,812 | 25.66 | 6 | 18 | –1 |
| Workers' Party | 16,222,159 | 19.22 | 2 | 10 | –4 |
| Brazilian Social Democracy Party | 10,547,778 | 12.50 | 5 | 14 | +3 |
| Brazilian Democratic Movement Party | 10,148,024 | 12.03 | 4 | 16 | –3 |
| Communist Party of Brazil | 6,364,019 | 7.54 | 1 | 2 | +2 |
| Democratic Labour Party | 5,023,041 | 5.95 | 1 | 5 | 0 |
| Progressive Party | 4,228,431 | 5.01 | 1 | 1 | 0 |
| Brazilian Labour Party | 2,676,469 | 3.17 | 3 | 4 | +1 |
| Brazilian Socialist Party | 2,143,355 | 2.54 | 1 | 3 | –1 |
| Green Party | 1,425,765 | 1.69 | 0 | 0 | 0 |
| Popular Socialist Party | 1,232,571 | 1.46 | 1 | 1 | 0 |
| Liberal Party | 696,501 | 0.83 | 1 | 3 | 0 |
| Brazilian Labour Renewal Party | 644,111 | 0.76 | 1 | 1 | +1 |
| Socialism and Liberty Party | 351,527 | 0.42 | 0 | 1 | New |
| Brazilian Republican Party | 264,155 | 0.31 | 0 | 2 | New |
| United Socialist Workers' Party | 196,636 | 0.23 | 0 | 0 | 0 |
| Social Christian Party | 131,548 | 0.16 | 0 | 0 | 0 |
| Labour Party of Brazil | 69,923 | 0.08 | 0 | 0 | 0 |
| Party of the Reconstruction of the National Order | 69,640 | 0.08 | 0 | 0 | 0 |
| Brazilian Communist Party | 62,756 | 0.07 | 0 | 0 | 0 |
| Social Democratic Christian Party | 53,025 | 0.06 | 0 | 0 | 0 |
| Social Liberal Party | 46,542 | 0.06 | 0 | 0 | 0 |
| Christian Labour Party | 39,690 | 0.05 | 0 | 0 | 0 |
| Workers' Cause Party | 27,476 | 0.03 | 0 | 0 | 0 |
| Humanist Party of Solidarity | 24,940 | 0.03 | 0 | 0 | 0 |
| Progressive Republican Party | 12,954 | 0.02 | 0 | 0 | 0 |
| Party of National Mobilization | 12,925 | 0.02 | 0 | 0 | 0 |
| National Labour Party | 11,063 | 0.01 | 0 | 0 | 0 |
| Party of the Nation's Retirees | 2,969 | 0.00 | 0 | 0 | 0 |
| Total | 84,383,805 | 100.00 | 27 | 81 | 0 |
| Valid votes | 84,383,805 | 80.54 | | | |
| Invalid/blank votes | 20,394,952 | 19.46 | | | |
| Total votes | 104,778,757 | 100.00 | | | |
| Registered voters/turnout | 125,827,119 | 83.27 | | | |
Source: Election Resources

=== Gubernatorial elections ===
The Governors elected in 2006 were the following:

- Acre – Binho Marques from the Workers' Party
- Alagoas – Vilela Filho from the Brazilian Social Democratic Party
- Amapá – Waldez Góes from the Democratic Labour Party (re-elected)
- Amazonas – Eduardo Braga from the Brazilian Democratic Movement Party (re-elected)
- Bahia – Jaques Wagner from the Workers' Party
- Ceará – Cid Gomes from the Brazilian Socialist Party
- Espírito Santo – Paulo Hartung from the Brazilian Democratic Movement Party (re-elected)
- Federal District – José Roberto Arruda from the Liberal Front Party
- Goiás – Alcides Rodrigues from the Progressive Party
- Maranhão – Jackson Lago from the Democratic Labour Party
- Mato Grosso – Blairo Maggi from the Socialist People's Party (re-elected)
- Mato Grosso do Sul – André Puccinelli from the Brazilian Democratic Movement Party
- Minas Gerais – Aécio Neves from the Brazilian Social Democratic Party (re-elected)
- Pará – Ana Júlia Carepa from the Workers' Party
- Paraíba – Cássio Cunha Lima from the Brazilian Social Democratic Party (re-elected)
- Paraná – Roberto Requião from the Brazilian Democratic Movement Party (re-elected)
- Pernambuco – Eduardo Campos from the Brazilian Socialist Party
- Piauí – Wellington Dias from the Workers' Party (re-elected)
- Rio de Janeiro – Sérgio Cabral Filho from the Brazilian Democratic Movement Party
- Rio Grande do Norte – Wilma de Faria from the Brazilian Socialist Party (re-elected)
- Rio Grande do Sul – Yeda Crusius from the Brazilian Social Democratic Party
- Rondônia – Ivo Cassol from the Socialist People's Party (re-elected)
- Roraima – Ottomar Pinto from the Brazilian Social Democratic Party (re-elected)
- Santa Catarina – Luiz Henrique da Silveira from the Brazilian Democratic Movement Party (re-elected)
- São Paulo – José Serra from the Brazilian Social Democratic Party
- Sergipe – Marcelo Déda from the Workers' Party
- Tocantins – Marcelo Miranda from the Brazilian Democratic Movement Party
