= Party of the Reconstruction of the National Order =

Party of the Reconstruction of the National Order Partido da Reedificação da Ordem Nacional
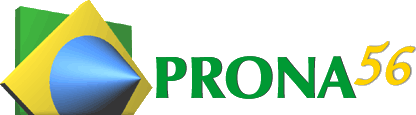
- President: Enéas Carneiro
- Founded: 20 June 1989
- Dissolved: 26 October 2006
- Merged into: Liberal Party
- Headquarters: SCN Qd. 1, Bl. E, nº50, sala 114 Ed. Central Park - Asa Norte; Brasília
- Ideology: Brazilian nationalism; Paternalistic conservatism; National conservatism; Social conservatism; Economic nationalism; Economic interventionism; Anti-communism; Anti-globalization; LaRouche Movement
- Political position: Right-wing to far-right
- Colours: Green and yellow
- TSE Identification Number: 56

Party flag
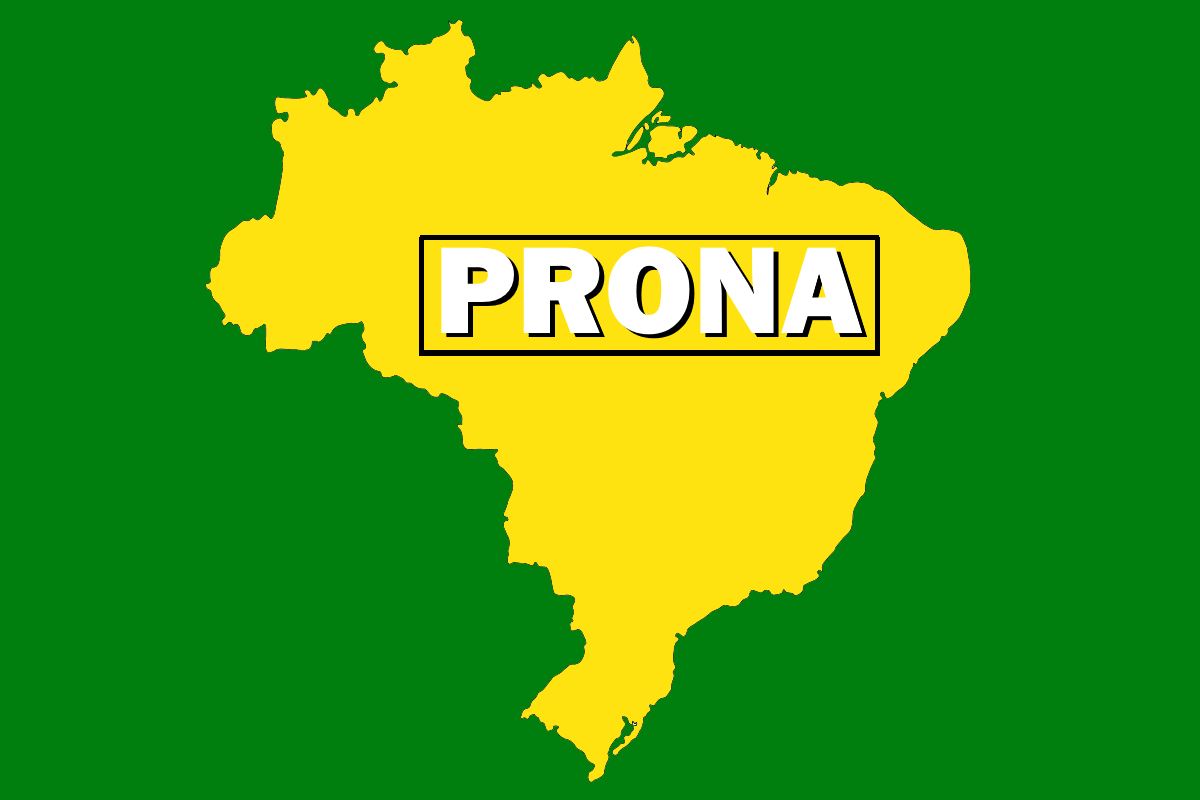

Website
- www.prona.org.br

The Party of the Reconstruction of the National Order (Portuguese: Partido de Reedificação da Ordem Nacional, PRONA) was a nationalist political party in Brazil. Its electoral code was 56 and its colors were the traditional Brazilian green and yellow. It was founded in 1989 by the cardiologist, professor and politician Enéas Carneiro, who was the president of the party. Its political broadcasts during the pre-election campaigning periods became famous and distinct for the speed in which they were produced due to the very short time the party had available and also because of the use of Beethoven's Fifth Symphony as soundtrack.

The party was strongly identified with the figure of Enéas, who was candidate to the presidency of Brazil in 1989, 1994 and 1998.

The party was extinguished in 2006, shortly before the death of Enéas, being succeeded by the Party of the Republic.

== Corruption ==
The Electoral Corruption Movement, based on data released by the Superior Electoral Court on 4 October 2007, released a balance sheet containing parties with the largest number of members of the judiciary who had been expelled for corruption since the year 2000. PRONA appeared in last place, with a single expel, tied with the Humanist Party of Solidarity, Green Party and Progressive Republican Party.

== Electoral history ==
=== Presidential elections ===
| Election | Candidate | Running mate | First round | | Second round | | Result |
| Election | Candidate | Running mate | Votes | % | Votes | % | Result |
|---|---|---|---|---|---|---|---|
| 1989 | Enéas Carneiro | Lenine Madeira | 360,561 | 0.52% | | | Lost |
| 1994 | Enéas Carneiro | Roberto Gama e Silva | 4,671,457 | 7.38% | | | Lost |
| 1998 | Enéas Carneiro | Irapuan Teixeira | 1,447,090 | 2.14% | | | Lost |
Sources: Tribunal Superior Eleitoral, Georgetown University

=== National Congress elections ===
| Election | Chamber of Deputies | | | | Federal Senate | | |
| Election | Votes | % | Seats | +/– | Votes | % | Seats |
|---|---|---|---|---|---|---|---|
| 1990 | 12,464 | 0.03% | 0 / 503 | New | Incomplete data | | 0 / 31 |
| 1994 | 308,031 | 0.67% | 0 / 513 | 0 | 1,150,157 | 1.20% | 0 / 54 |
| 1998 | 592,632 | 0.89% | 1 / 513 | ▲1 | 376,040 | 0.61% | 0 / 27 |
| 2002 | 1,804,104 | 2.06% | 6 / 513 | ▲5 | 145,016 | 0.09% | 0 / 54 |
| 2006 | 907,494 | 0.97% | 2 / 513 | ▼4 | 69,640 | 0.08% | 0 / 27 |
Sources: Nohlen, Election Resources

| Preceded by 55 - SDP (PSD) | Numbers of Brazilian Official Political Parties; 56 - PRNAO (PRONA) defunct | Succeeded by 65 - CPofB (PCdoB) |
