= João de Deus Barbosa de Jesus =

Brazilian businessman and politician

João de Deus Barbosa de Jesus (8 March 1932 in Salvador, Bahia - 16 August 2002 in Rio de Janeiro) was a Brazilian businessman and politician.

João de Deus founded the Workers' Nationalist Party in 1990 and ran for federal deputy in that year's election, not getting elected. After managing to get a candidate for state deputy elected in Ceará, the party ceased its activities in 1991 and was refounded in December as the Brazilian Workers' Nationalist Party. The party contested the 1992 municipal elections and merged in 1993 with the Labour Party of Brazil (PTdoB).

Affiliated with the PTdoB, João de Deus ran for president in the 1998 presidential election. In his electoral campaign, he proposed to fight unemployment; to transfer the Amazon River to Northeast Brazil, a region affected by droughts; to create an exit for Brazil to the Pacific Ocean; and to implement projects from Getúlio Vargas' government, which included investments in public healthcare, the opening of state-funded restaurants for the poor and the increase in the minimum wage. His candidacy was challenged in the Superior Electoral Court by the national leadership of his party, which had predetermined not to launch its own candidate. João de Deus received 0.29% of the votes, coming 8th of 12 candidates.

In 2000, he ran for councillor in the city of Rio de Janeiro, but was not elected.
