= Ana Maria Rangel =

Brazilian politician (born 1957)

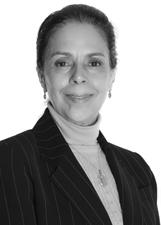

Personal details
- Born: 21 May 1957 (age 69) Rio de Janeiro, Brazil

Ana Maria Rangel (Rio de Janeiro, May 21, 1957) is a political scientist graduated from Oglethorpe University in Atlanta, Georgia. Rangel studied and made presentations and talks about the socioeconomic situation in Brazil. She was also a business owner in the transportation sector.

Rangel followed her husband to the United States, shortly after marrying, where she lived for 25 years. Having a very active life, she successfully split her time as head of family, business executive and social worker.

Rangel obtained an amateur soccer coach certification so that she, being divorced, could more closely accompany her son as he played soccer. She followed her son, who had been recruited to play for São Paulo FC, back to São Paulo, Brazil, where she began inquiring about politics. A practicing Catholic, she volunteered with the Saint Vincent de Paul Society, helping guarantee the rights of immigrants and promoting the dignity of life.

Rangel's experience in social work and her knowledge of the socioeconomic situation in Brazil, led her to become a candidate for President of Brazil under the Partido Republicano Progressista (PRP) party in 2006. She had very little access to the free press since in Brazil, free television time is allocated to the different candidates based on the size of the party and PRP was small. She obtained the most votes among the small parties. During her presidential campaign, she was asked to pay a bribe in the amount of R$14 million to guarantee her status as a candidate by the leader of the PRP party. The party leaders affirmed that the payment was a deal to pay for her campaign staff and marketing. After publicizing the negotiation and broadcasting a hidden recording of the negotiations, she began running her campaign with an "anti-corruption" theme. The PRP then denounced and removed Ana Maria from their ballot and she attempted to run independently. In Brazil one cannot run independently and must have the party's endorsement. She had to appeal to the Justice Department where she was confirmed as a candidate allowing her to campaign for a short time through Election Day.
