= Enéas Carneiro =

Brazilian politician (1938–2007)

Enéas Ferreira Carneiro
- Carneiro in the 1990s

Federal Deputy
- In office February 1, 2003 – May 6, 2007
- Constituency: São Paulo

Personal details
- Born: November 5, 1938 Rio Branco, Acre, Brazil
- Died: May 6, 2007 (aged 68) Rio de Janeiro, Brazil
- Party: PRONA (1989–2006); PR (2006–2007)
- Education: Medicine and Surgery School of Rio de Janeiro
- Profession: Cardiologist; Physicist; Mathematician; Professor; Writer; Politician; Military

Military service
- Allegiance: Brazil
- Branch/service: Brazilian Army
- Years of service: 1959–1965
- Rank: Sergeant

Enéas Ferreira Carneiro (Portuguese: [eˈnɛ(jj)ɐs feˈʁejɾɐ kaʁˈnejɾu]; November 5, 1938 — May 6, 2007) was a Brazilian polymath, cardiologist, physicist, mathematician, professor, writer, military serviceman and politician. He represented the state of São Paulo in the National Chamber of Deputies (the lower house of the National Congress) and ran for presidency three times. He was founder and leader of the nationalist and conservative Party of the Reconstruction of the National Order (PRONA), which was usually seen as being far-right. Although Enéas rejected the left-right dichotomy, as they were "sides of the same coin", defining himself only as a nationalist.

== Biography ==
Eneás Ferreira Carneiro was born in Rio Branco, Acre, located in Brazil's far west, in 1938, under extreme poverty. His parents were the barber Eustáquio José Carneiro and the housewife Mina Ferreiro Carneiro. Eustáquio Carneiro passed away when Eneás was nine years old, prompting him to start working from this young age. With an slightly improved financial condition, Eneás and his mother moved to Belém and started living in a shack eating flour and coffee.

Eneás was married to Jamile Augusta Ferreira, a fellow student of the School of Medicine and Surgery of Rio de Janeiro. The couple had one daughter, Janete, after both finished their studies at the School of Medicine. Five years later, Eneás had another daughter, Gabriela, with his union with the speech therapist Selene Maria. This relationship was also not long-running. Eneás, around 1982, married the prosecutor Adriana Lorandi, having his third daughter, Lígia. The third marriage of Enéas was also not long, since the cardiologist had to give away much property to create PRONA.

== Educational career ==
In 1958, Enéas begun his studies at the Army's School of Medicine, Rio de Janeiro. In the next year, graduated as third sergeant, auxiliary of anesthesiology, being the first of his class. At 1960, Carneiro enrolled in the School of Medicine and Surgery of Rio de Janeiro.

In February 1962, Enéas took the entrance exam for the Faculty of Philosophy, Science and Letters of the University of the State of Guanabara (nowadays, the UERJ). He was approved first place in two of his desired courses (physics and mathematics), and started to give classes in the same year on these areas for other students preparing for entrance exams.

Three years later, Carneiro finished his degree in medicine and asked to be discharged from the Central Army Hospital after helping in more than 5000 anesthesias and receiving the Marechal Hermes Medal.

Another three years later, in 1968, he finished his degrees in mathematics and physics, founding the Gradiente Course for university exams preparation. In his course, he taught mathematics, physics, chemistry, biology and Portuguese. In the next year, Carneiro enrolled in a specialization course in cardiology at the Rio de Janeiro House of Mercy.

Between 1973 and 1975, he enrolled and finished a master's degree on cardiology at the Federal University of Rio de Janeiro while teaching physiology and cardiovascular semiology at the same university. At the same year of his master's degree end, he ministered the first version of his course O Eletrocardiograma (The Electrocardiogram) at Rio de Janeiro, being ministed in the next years at São Paulo (1983), Quito (1985) and Rio (1986) as a nationwide course, at the Copacabana Palace hotel.

After defending his master's dissertation in 1976, he wrote his seminal work O Eletrocardiograma, publishing its first edition in 1977 with the second edition arriving ten years later as O Eletrocardiograma: 10 anos depois (The Electrocardiogram: 10 years later). O Eletrocardiograma is considered a reference work in cardiology in the Portuguese language, jokingly called the "Enéas' Bible".

Despite having been commonly referred as Doutor Enéas (Doctor Enéas), Enéas never defended a doctorate thesis. His unofficial "title" was assigned to him because of his medical occupation and his cult of personality.

== Political career ==
In 1989, he established PRONA. In that same year, he ran for the presidency in Brazil's first direct elections after the end of military rule. Under the electoral laws, every candidate was given a daily amount of free airtime to set out their agenda. Because airtime was proportional to the candidate's party's size, PRONA received roughly 15 seconds of airtime per TV appearance. Nevertheless, he made the most of the opportunity. His exotic image—he was a small, bald man with a large beard and "coke-bottle" (informal term for thick lens) glasses—drew attention, as did his inflamed speech. In what would become his trademark, he finished it with the catchphrase "meu nome é Enéas" ('my name is Enéas')—perhaps as gesture of humility or informality, or perhaps a way to save time. The previously unknown candidate placed 12th out of 21 candidates. He got 360,578 votes.

He returned in 1994, making use then of 1 minute and 17 seconds. Surprising political experts, he finished ahead of various established politicians, such as the then-governor of Rio de Janeiro (Leonel Brizola), the former governor of São Paulo (Orestes Quércia), and the then-governor of Santa Catarina (Esperidião Amin), with more than 4.6 million votes.

In 1998, Enéas got 35 seconds – less, in total airtime, than what he had in 1989 – to deliver a speech that was more nationalistic than ever. Its ideas, such as the construction of an atomic bomb, nationalization of Brazil's mineral resources, and an increase in the military budget, sparked controversy. According to him, with such an apparatus, Brazil could advance its interests at the UN and in other international treaties. He got 1.4 million votes.

His project focused basically on education, believing that only a strong, interventionist, and technical State would solve Brazil's problems. Although many may label him an authoritarian, his political approach is similar to that of social democracy, as in Sweden and Finland, for example, where the State is extremely important.

In 2000, he ran for mayor of the city of São Paulo, with no success, but he still managed to gain votes for the election of his councilman candidate, Havanir Nimtz.

In 2002, he ran for a seat as a federal deputy representing São Paulo and secured the most votes ever for that office. His party won enough votes under the proportional representation system to elect five more deputies.

Enéas also actively participated in the 2004 elections for mayors and council members, helping to choose council members in major cities such as Rio and São Paulo, and mayors in small cities.

In 2006, he was elected again as a federal deputy for São Paulo, this time with the third-highest vote in the state.

== Praise and criticism ==
Many saw Enéas as an exotic politician because of his direct criticism to Brazilians fraudulent politicians behavior. Enéas believed that by acting on TV what he called "the rage of the common citizen" would wake up Brazilian people against corrupt politicians.

== Death and legacy ==
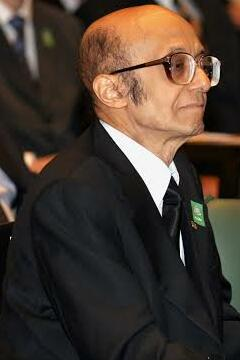
Carneiro in December 2006, five months before his death. He shaved off his signature beard before undergoing treatment against myeloid leukemia.

Enéas underwent chemotherapy at the Hospital Samaritano for myeloid leukemia. When it became clear that his treatment was not resulting in improvements, he decided to return home, where he remained until his death. Enéas died on May 6, 2007, at approximately 2 pm, at 68 years old, in the Laranjeiras neighborhood of southern Rio de Janeiro. His remains were cremated at the Rio de Janeiro House of Mercy's crematory and his ashes scattered over the Bay of Guanabara.

After his death, on May 8, 2007, Enéas was honored in a rally against abortion in Brasília, on May 8, 2007. According to the Party of the Republic, the politician was one of the organizers of the event.

In 2017, then-deputy and later President of Brazil Jair Bolsonaro proposed a bill to include Enéas' name in the Book of National Heroes. Another bill proposing Eneás to be declared the Brazilian patron of electrocardiography was approved in the lower house, but archived in the senate.

== See also ==
- Brazilian nationalism
- Conservatism in Brazil
- Politics of Brazil
- Developmentalism
- Leonel Brizola
- José Walter Bautista Vidal
- Aldo Rebelo
