= National Mobilization =

Political party in Brazil

National Mobilization Mobilização Nacional
- Abbreviation: MOBILIZA
- President: Antonio Massarollo
- Founded: 21 April 1984
- Registered: 25 October 1990
- Headquarters: São Paulo, SP
- Think tank: Fundação Juscelino Kubitschek
- Membership (2023): ▼202,532
- Ideology: Brazilian nationalism; Civic nationalism; Historical: Third-worldism
- Political position: Centre-right; Historical: Centre-left
- Colors: Red, white and black
- Slogan: "The name of sovereignty"
- Anthem: Hino da Independência
- Party number: 33
- Legislative Assemblies: 6 / 1,024
- Mayors: 13 / 5,568
- Municipal Chambers: 200 / 58,208

Party flag

Website
- mobiliza.org.br

The National Mobilization (Portuguese: Mobilização Nacional, MOBILIZA) is a political party in Brazil founded by politicians from the state of Minas Gerais on April 21, 1984, advocating for agrarian reform, termination of debt payments, ending of relations with the International Monetary Fund and formation of a trade bloc with other South American nations.

Due to some problems with the Brazilian Electoral Court, the PMN's registration was ceased in January 1989. The party restarted in June of the same year. At the legislative elections in Brazil, 6 October 2002, the party won one out of 513 seats in the Chamber of Deputies and no seats in the Senate. From 2002 to 2010, the PMN was one of the members of Luiz Inácio Lula da Silva's coalition.

At the 2010 elections, the PMN won four seats in the Chamber of Deputies and won the governorship of the state of Amazonas. In the Presidential race, the party supported the coalition of José Serra.

At the 2018 elections, the PMN won three seats, without endorsing any presidential candidates. Two of them later moved to the Liberal Party, leaving only one MP.

== Election results ==
=== Presidential elections ===
Election	Candidate	First round		Second round		Result
Election	Candidate	Votes	%	Votes	%	Result
1989	Celso Brant	109,909	0.16%	—N/a		✗ Lost
1994	Supported Leonel Brizola (PDT)	2,015,836	3.18%	—N/a		✗ Lost
1998	Ivan Moacyr da Frota	251,337	0.37%	—N/a		✗ Lost
2002	Supported Lula da Silva (PT)	39,455,233	46.44%	52,793,364	61.27%	✓ Won
2010	Supported José Serra (PSDB)	33,132,283	32.61%	43,711,388	43.95%	✗ Lost
2014	Supported Aécio Neves (PSDB)	34,897,211	33.55%	51,041,155	48.36%	✗ Lost
Sources: Tribunal Superior Eleitoral, Georgetown University

=== National Congress elections ===
Election	Chamber of Deputies				Federal Senate		
Election	Votes	%	Seats	+/–	Votes	%	Seats
1986	44,173	0.09%	0 / 487	New	Incomplete data		0 / 49
1990	249,606	0.62%	1 / 503	▲1	Incomplete data		0 / 31
1994	257,018	0.56%	4 / 513	▲3	486,430	0.51%	0 / 54
1998	360,298	0.54%	2 / 513	▼2	144,541	0.23%	0 / 27
2002	282,878	0.32%	1 / 513	▼1	358,062	0.23%	0 / 54
2006	875,686	0.94%	3 / 513	▲2	12,925	0.02%	0 / 27
2010	1,086,705	1.13%	4 / 513	▲1	241,321	0.14%	1 / 54
2014	467,777	0.48%	3 / 513	▼1	57,911	0.06%	0 / 27
2018	634,129	0.64%	3 / 513	0	329,973	0.19%	0 / 54
2022	256,578	0.23%	0 / 513	▼3	27,812	0.03%	0 / 27
2026	34,272	0.03%	0 / 513	0	533,859	0.26%	0 / 54
Sources: Nohlen, Election Resources

Preceded by 30 – NEW (NOVO)	Numbers of Brazilian Official Political Parties; 33 – MOBILIZE (MOBILIZA)	Succeeded by 35 – Democrat (Democrata)
