= 1994 Brazilian general election =

- 3 October 1994
- Presidential election
- Turnout: 82.24% (▼5.84 pp)
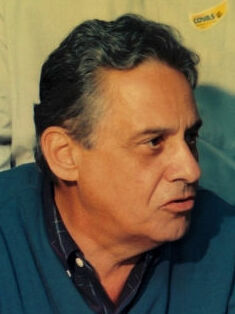

Candidate	Fernando Henrique Cardoso	Lula da Silva	Enéas Carneiro
Party	PSDB	PT	PRONA
Alliance	Union, Work and Progress	Popular Brazil Front for Citizenship
Running mate	Marco Maciel (PFL)	Aloizio Mercadante	Roberto Gama
Popular vote	34,364,961	17,122,127	4,671,457
Percentage	54.28%	27.04%	7.38%
- Election by states, shaded accounding to vote share
President before election
Itamar Franco
PRN
Elected President
Fernando Henrique Cardoso
PSDB
- Chamber of Deputies
- 513 seats in the Chamber of Deputies; 257 seats needed for a majority
Party	Leader	Vote %	Seats	+/–
MDB	Orestes Quércia	20.32	107	−1
PSDB	Pimenta da Veiga	13.90	62	+24
PFL	Jorge Bornhausen	12.85	89	+6
PT	Rui Falcão	12.82	49	+14
PPR	Esperidião Amin	9.43	52	−12
PDT	Leonel Brizola	7.23	34	−12
PP		6.94	36	+32
PTB		5.21	31	−7
PL	Alvaro Valle	3.51	13	−3
PSB		2.18	15	+4
PCdoB		1.24	10	+5
PSD		0.91	3	+2
PMN		0.56	4	+3
PPS		0.56	2	New
PSC		0.47	3	−3
PRP	Ovasco Roma	0.45	1	+1
PRN	Daniel Tourinho	0.40	1	−39
PV			1	New
This lists parties that won seats. See the complete results below.

General elections were held in Brazil on October 3, 1994, the second to take place under the provisions of the 1988 constitution and the second direct presidential election since 1960.

Elected in 1989, President Fernando Collor of the centre-right National Reconstruction Party (PRN) had resigned in the face of an impeachment trial, resulting in Vice President Itamar Franco succeeding him. Facing a fiscal crisis Franco's government launched the Plano Real ("Real Plan") to stabilize the national economy. With Franco barred from running for a full term, the architect of the Real Plan, Minister of Finance Fernando Henrique Cardoso, was chosen by the PSDB to serve as their presidential candidate in Franco's absence. For the position of Vice President, Cardoso selected former presidential Chief of Staff Marco Maciel of the Liberal Front Party (PFL).

Luiz Inácio Lula da Silva, a former labor leader and federal deputy for São Paulo who had narrowly lost the 1989 presidential election, resigned as president of the Workers' Party (PT) to mount a second presidential candidacy. Lula intended to make José Paulo Bisol of the Brazilian Socialist Party (PSB) his running mate as he had in 1989. Bisol was replaced by Lula ally and fellow PT member Aloizio Mercadante on the ticket. In the spring of 1994, Lula appeared an overwhelming favorite over Cardoso, leading with 40% to Cardoso's 12% in an April poll, and by a 41% to 17% margin as of May. The Real Plan proved popular among Lula's own voters, with 70% of Lula supporters indicating their support for the Franco Administration's signature policy, and Lula was damaged by his opposition to the program.

On election day, Cardoso received 54 percent of the vote, negating the need for a second round. He defeated Lula by over 27 points, still a record margin for a presidential election held under democratic conditions. Cardoso notably won every state in the northeast, a region which would later emerge as the PT's political base. The relative success of far-right candidate Enéas Carneiro, a cardiologist who had never won office before and ran as a member of the Party of the Reconstruction of the National Order (PRONA), was also noted; Carneiro received over 7% of the vote, placing him ahead of many established politicians. Carneiro's vote share was the highest received by a far-right presidential candidate until Jair Bolsonaro's victory in 2018.

As of 2026, this remains the most recent presidential election in which a right-leaning candidate carried Ceará.

== Background ==
In 1989, Brazil held its first direct presidential election since 1960 following the end of the military dictatorship in Brazil. Fernando Collor, a young, charismatic leader who had previous served as Governor of Alagoas, won a hotly contested election versus Luiz Inácio Lula da Silva after positioning himself as a political outsider. Just over two years into his presidency, Collor was faced with allegations of corruption by his brother Pedro Collor, and chose to resign in late 1992 rather than face certain conviction and removal in an impeachment trial.

Following his resignation, Vice President Itamar Franco succeeded him in the office. Once in office, Franco switched from the National Reconstruction Party (PRN) to the Brazilian Democratic Movement Party (PMDB). Facing a hyperinflation crisis and popular discontent, Franco's government pushed a fiscal policy known as the Plano Real (Real Plan) to stabilize the economy. Minister of Finance Fernando Henrique Cardoso, an experienced politician who had previously served as Senator from São Paulo and as Franco's Minister of Foreign Affairs, served as the architect of the plan.

Franco was barred from running for a full term in 1994. In Brazil, whenever a vice president serves part of a president's term, even when the president travels abroad, it counts as a full term. At the time, the Constitution did not allow a president to run for immediate reelection. In the absence of Franco, Cardoso would be chosen by the PSDB (a party born from inside the PMDB) as their nominee for President of Brazil in the 1994 election.

== Lula's running mate controversy ==
As he had in 1989, Lula intended for Senator José Paulo Bisol of Rio Grande do Sul, a member of the Brazilian Socialist Party (PSB), to serve as his vice presidential running mate. A former judge, Bisol had a strong reputation as an opponent of corruption, playing a key role in the investigation that ultimately led to President Fernando Collor de Mello's resignation. Additionally, his membership of a party that played a crucial role in the centre-left coalition made his selection attractive to Lula. Bisol's image as a "Mr. Clean" was harmed during campaign season by revelations of wrongdoing as a judge in 1981.

The saga proved damaging to Lula's campaign, and as a result the leadership of the PT looked for a replacement for Bisol on the ticket. Arguing that Bisol should be replaced on the ticket by a fellow member of the PSB, PSB president Miguel Arraes pushed for the selection of Célio de Castro, then serving as Vice Mayor of Belo Horizonte, to replace Bisol as Lula's running mate. Key power-players in the PT, such as party president Rui Falcão, successfully convinced Lula to replace Bisol with Aloizio Mercadante. A co-founder of the PT, Mercadante was then serving as a federal deputy for São Paulo. Mercadante's background as a career economist during a hyperinflation crisis was seen as a plus for PT party leadership.

== Campaign of Enéas Carneiro ==
In the 1989 presidential election, the right-wing nationalist campaign of Enéas Carneiro received attention for Carneiro's exotic image. A short, bald man with a long beard and distinct "coke-bottle" glasses, Carneiro's unusual appearance and signature catchphrase Meu nome é Enéas ("My name is Enéas") gained the cardiologist a following. Nonetheless, Carneiro, who ran as a member of the Party of the Reconstruction of the National Order (PRONA), came 12th in a field of 21 candidates.

In 1994, Carneiro mounted a second bid for the presidency. The entrance of federal deputy Regina Gordilho of Rio de Janeiro, who had been elected as a member of the centre-left Democratic Labour Party, allowed his campaign to receive more guaranteed election time. For the position of Vice President, Carneiro chose Rear Admiral Roberto Gama e Silva to serve as his running mate.

Considered a nationalist and accused by opponents of being a member of the far-right, Carneiro's unexpected third-place finish with over 7% of the national vote was considered a shocking result. Carneiro, who had never been elected to office, received a larger share of the vote than longtime staple of the Brazilian Left Leonel Brizola, who had been a top candidate for the presidency four years prior.

== Candidates ==
Party	Candidate	Most relevant political office or occupation	Party	Running mate	Coalition	Electoral number
Reform Progressive Party (PPR)	Esperidião Amin	Governor of Santa Catarina (1983–1987)	Reform Progressive Party (PPR)	Gardênia Gonçalves	—N/a	11
Democratic Labour Party (PDT)	Leonel Brizola	Governor of Rio de Janeiro (1991–1994)	Democratic Labour Party (PDT)	Darcy Ribeiro	Strength of the People: Democratic Labour Party (PDT); Party of National Mobilization (PMN)	12
Workers' Party (PT)	Luiz Inácio Lula da Silva	Member of the Chamber of Deputies from São Paulo (1987–1991)	Workers' Party (PT)	Aloizio Mercadante	Popular Brazil Front for Citizenship: Workers' Party (PT); Brazilian Socialist Party (PSB); Popular Socialist Party (PPS); Green Party (PV); Communist Party of Brazil (PCdoB); Brazilian Communist Party (PCB); United Socialist Workers' Party (PSTU)	13
Brazilian Democratic Movement Party (PMDB)	Orestes Quércia	Governor of São Paulo (1987–1991)	Brazilian Democratic Movement Party (PMDB)	Iris de Araújo	Development of Brazil: Brazilian Democratic Movement Party (PMDB); Social Democratic Party (PSD); Progressive Republican Party (PRP)	15
Social Christian Party (PSC)	Hernani Fortuna	Admiral of the Brazilian Navy	Social Christian Party (PSC)	Vítor Nosseis	—N/a	20
National Reconstruction Party (PRN)	Carlos Antônio Gomes		National Reconstruction Party (PRN)	Dilton Carlos Salomoni	—N/a	36
Brazilian Social Democracy Party (PSDB)	Fernando Henrique Cardoso	Minister of Finance of Brazil (1993–1994)	Liberal Front Party (PFL)	Marco Maciel	Union, Work and Progress: Brazilian Social Democracy Party (PSDB); Liberal Front Party (PFL); Brazilian Labour Party (PTB)	45
Party of the Reconstruction of the National Order (PRONA)	Enéas Carneiro	PRONA National President (1989–2006)	Party of the Reconstruction of the National Order (PRONA)	Roberto Gama	—N/a	56

=== Candidacies denied ===
Party	Candidate	Most relevant political office or occupation	Party	Running mate	Coalition	Electoral number
Liberal Party (PL)	Flávio Rocha	Member of the Chamber of Deputies from Rio Grande do Norte (1987–1995)	Liberal Party (PL)	Jadihel Lohedo Júnior	—N/a	22
Labour Party of Brazil (PTdoB)	Caetano Matanó Júnior.		Labour Party of Brazil (PTdoB)	Rafael Francisco	—N/a	70

== Results ==
=== President ===
Candidate	Running mate	Party	Votes	%
Fernando Henrique Cardoso	Marco Maciel (PFL)	Brazilian Social Democracy Party	34,364,961	54.28
Luiz Inácio Lula da Silva	Aloizio Mercadante	Workers' Party	17,122,127	27.04
Enéas Carneiro	Roberto Gama	Party of the Reconstruction of the National Order	4,671,457	7.38
Orestes Quércia	Iris de Araújo	Brazilian Democratic Movement Party	2,772,121	4.38
Leonel Brizola	Darcy Ribeiro	Democratic Labour Party	2,015,836	3.18
Esperidião Amin	Gardênia Gonçalves	Reform Progressive Party	1,739,894	2.75
Carlos Antônio Gomes	Dilton Carlos Salomoni	National Reconstruction Party	387,738	0.61
Hernani Fortuna	Vitor Nósseis	Social Christian Party	238,197	0.38
Total			63,312,331	100.00
Valid votes			63,312,331	81.22
Invalid/blank votes			14,636,133	18.78
Total votes			77,948,464	100.00
Registered voters/turnout			94,782,803	82.24
Source: TSE

==== Results by federative unit ====
Federative unit	Cardoso		Lula		Carneiro		Others	
Federative unit	Votes	%	Votes	%	Votes	%	Votes	%
Acre	90,132	54.01	39,656	23.76	12,636	7.57	24,461	14.66
Alagoas	525,036	76.18	84,929	12.32	31,131	4.52	48,069	6.98
Amapá	76,397	59.11	34,623	26.79	11,727	9.07	6,505	5.03
Amazonas	419,742	60.50	161,390	23.26	59,444	8.57	53,265	7.67
Bahia	1,951,179	52.40	1,310,823	35.20	164,451	4.42	297,437	7.98
Ceará	1,517,698	61.19	669,425	26.99	74,382	3.00	218,908	8.82
Espírito Santo	714,958	60.04	331,798	27.86	79,532	6.68	64,534	5.42
Federal District	315,106	38.69	364,541	44.76	79,237	9.73	55,554	6.82
Goiás	1,171,550	67.48	322,907	18.60	93,314	5.37	148,358	8.55
Maranhão	785,417	62.25	292,057	23.15	72,687	5.76	111,554	8.84
Mato Grosso	495,956	64.29	147,307	19.10	40,304	5.22	87,846	11.39
Mato Grosso do Sul	512,527	63.59	179,296	22.25	49,527	6.15	64,600	8.01
Minas Gerais	4,536,780	64.82	1,532,740	21.90	478,926	6.84	450,401	6.44
Pará	809,793	54.53	453,794	30.56	115,955	7.81	105,410	7.10
Paraíba	761,876	63.05	311,142	25.75	44,088	3.65	91,302	7.55
Paraná	2,382,093	60.33	898,231	22.75	256,071	6.49	412,155	10.43
Pernambuco	1,381,756	53.81	949,865	36.99	99,061	3.86	136,989	5.34
Piauí	476,404	51.51	296,077	32.01	27,083	2.93	125,360	13.55
Rio de Janeiro	3,102,664	47.18	1,689,772	25.69	767,702	11.67	1,016,170	15.46
Rio Grande do Norte	606,681	64.29	227,252	24.08	41,383	4.39	68,317	7.24
Rio Grande do Sul	1,422,390	29.57	1,610,379	33.48	450,153	9.36	1,327,538	27.59
Rondônia	259,418	63.36	89,838	21.94	25,811	6.30	34,395	8.40
Roraima	60,693	71.64	11,575	13.66	7,313	8.63	5,133	6.07
Santa Catarina	789,001	33.20	630,999	26.55	162,721	6.85	793,692	33.40
São Paulo	8,679,287	55.74	4,205,530	27.01	1,380,690	8.87	1,304,816	8.38
Sergipe	270,984	47.37	211,320	36.94	32,999	5.77	56,739	9.92
Tocantins	234,699	68.03	54,989	15.94	12,566	3.64	42,759	12.39
Abroad	14,744	55.22	9,872	39.97	563	2.10	1,519	5.68
Total	34,364,961	54.28	17,122,127	27.04	4,671,457	7.38	7,153,786	11.30
Source: Superior Electoral Court

=== Chamber of Deputies ===
Party	Votes	%	Seats	+/–
Brazilian Democratic Movement Party	9,287,049	20.32	107	–1
Brazilian Social Democracy Party	6,350,941	13.90	62	+24
Liberal Front Party	5,873,370	12.85	89	+6
Workers' Party	5,859,347	12.82	49	+14
Reform Progressive Party	4,307,878	9.43	52	–12
Democratic Labour Party	3,303,434	7.23	34	–12
Progressive Party	3,169,626	6.94	36	+32
Brazilian Labour Party	2,379,773	5.21	31	–7
Liberal Party	1,603,330	3.51	13	–3
Brazilian Socialist Party	995,298	2.18	15	+4
Communist Party of Brazil	567,186	1.24	10	+5
Social Democratic Party	414,933	0.91	3	+2
Party of the Reconstruction of the National Order	308,031	0.67	0	0
Party of National Mobilization	257,018	0.56	4	+3
Popular Socialist Party	256,485	0.56	2	New
Social Christian Party	213,734	0.47	3	–3
Progressive Republican Party	207,307	0.45	1	+1
National Reconstruction Party	184,727	0.40	1	–39
Green Party	154,666	0.34	1	New
Brazilian Communist Party	154,666	0.34	0	–3
Brazilian Renewal Labour Party	154,666	0.34	0	New
United Socialist Workers' Party	154,666	0.34	0	New
Labour Party of Brazil	39	0.00	0	0
Total	45,694,172	100.00	513	+10
Valid votes	45,694,172	58.84		
Invalid/blank votes	31,966,623	41.16		
Total votes	77,660,795	100.00		
Registered voters/turnout	94,743,043	81.97		

=== Senate ===
Party	Votes	%	Seats
Brazilian Social Democracy Party	15,652,182	16.34	9
Brazilian Democratic Movement Party	14,870,466	15.52	14
Workers' Party	13,350,294	13.93	4
Liberal Front Party	13,014,066	13.58	11
Democratic Labour Party	7,299,932	7.62	4
Liberal Party	7,138,405	7.45	1
Reform Progressive Party	4,473,291	4.67	2
Progressive Party	4,208,013	4.39	4
Brazilian Labour Party	4,015,701	4.19	3
Popular Socialist Party	2,447,931	2.55	1
Brazilian Socialist Party	2,336,549	2.44	1
National Reconstruction Party	1,628,491	1.70	0
Party of the Reconstruction of the National Order	1,150,157	1.20	0
Social Christian Party	963,615	1.01	0
Communist Party of Brazil	751,428	0.78	0
Social Democratic Party	737,939	0.77	0
United Socialist Workers' Party	674,856	0.70	0
Progressive Republican Party	613,761	0.64	0
Party of National Mobilization	486,430	0.51	0
Total	95,813,507	100.00	54
Total votes	77,949,111	–	
Registered voters/turnout	94,743,043	82.27	
Source: Nohlen
