= Alfredo Sirkis =

Brazilian politician and writer (1950–2020)

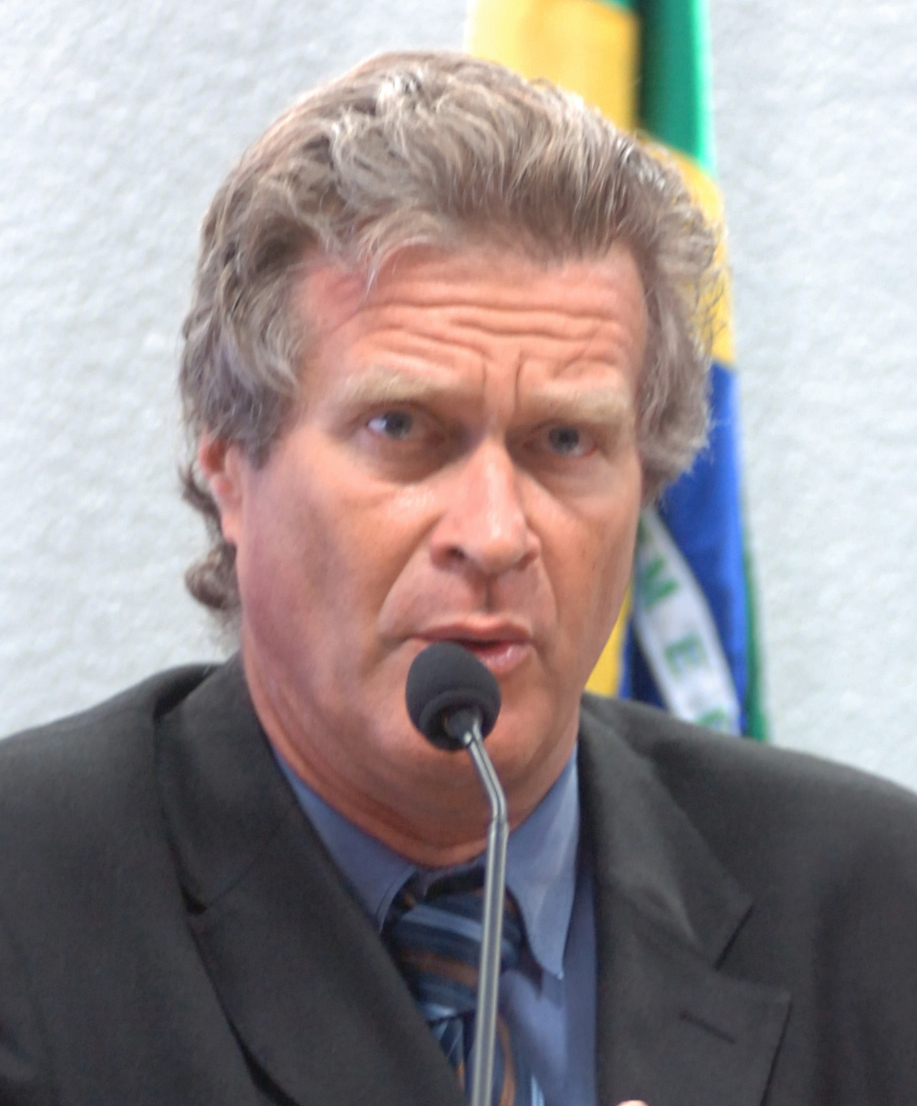

Federal Deputy for Rio de Janeiro
- In office 1 January 2011 – 31 January 2014

Personal details
- Born: Alfredo Hélio Syrkis; 8 December 1950 Rio de Janeiro, Brazil
- Died: 10 July 2020 (aged 69) Nova Iguaçu, Brazil
- Occupation: Journalist and writer

Alfredo Hélio Syrkis (8 December 1950 – 10 July 2020) was a Brazilian writer (winner of the Jabuti Award, in 1981), journalist, urban environmental manager and former parliamentarian, having served as the chairman of the Joint Climate Change Congressional Commission – CMMC, and vice-chairman of the Commission of Foreign Affairs and National Defense of the House. He was the Brazilian Green Party's presidential candidate in the 1998 election. In 2010, he was elected to the Brazilian national parliament (2011–2014) but decided not to run for re-election in 2014.

He was the executive director of the Brazilian Climate Center think tank. He was also the Coordinator of the Brazilian Forum for Climate Change from October 2016 to May 2019, working with government, business, and civil society stakeholders in the implementation of the Brazilian National Determined Commitment. He was a member of the Brazilian delegations to the UNFCCC Conferences of Berlin, Montreal, Bali, Copenhagen, Durban, Warsaw, Lima, Paris, Marrakesh, Bonn and Katowice. He was one of the promoters of the concept of carbon "positive pricing" and of the recognition of the "social and economic value of mitigation actions" enshrined in Paragraph 108 of the Paris Decision.

== Writer and journalist ==
Alfredo Sirkis has published ten books, including two national best sellers, Os Carbonários, granted in 1981, Brazil's main literary prize – the Prêmio Jabuti – and Roleta Chilena. His more recent book is Descarbonário just published in Brazil that has an English version Decarbonizer to be published soon. It discusses climate change and his 30 years activism on the issue. He was an op-ed collaborator of the Brazilian newspapers: O Globo, Folha de São Paulo, O Estado de São Paulo, Valor Econômico, and Correio Brasiliense. He also wrote screenplays for TV and cinema. Sirkis has worked as a journalist since his years in exile: Libération and Le Monde Diplomatique (1973–79, France), Expresso, Diario Popular, Republica, A Gazeta da Semana, Jornal Novo, Cadernos do Terceiro Mundo (1994–99 – Portugal) and then in Brazil: Veja (1982–83) and Istoé (1993).

== Local work ==
He was elected four times to the Rio de Janeiro City Council (88, 92, 96 and 2008) and served as Rio's Commissioner for the Environment (1993–1996) and for Urban Management (2001–2006) cumulatively, with the presidency of the Pereira Passos Municipal Urban Planning Institute (IPP).

== Councilman ==
He was the most voted councilman in the 1988 and re-elected in 1992, 1996, and 2008. As a city legislator he created the Environmental Protection Areas (APA) of Prainha, Bosque da Freguesia and Lagoa de Marapendi. He was the rapporteur for the environmental chapters of the Municipal Constitution and the Directory Plan and author of the so-called Sirkis Law: tax stimulants for environmental projects, that helped to establish the Global Forum 9, the civil society event during the 1992 Earth Summit, in Rio. He chaired the parliamentary investigation commission of illegal private security activities, and was Commissioner for the Environment.

As Rio's commissioner for the environment he was responsible for the construction of the largest bicycle network in Brazil, developed the community reforestation in 47 hillside favelas (shanty towns); established the GDA (Environmental Protection Group) within the Municipal Guard and negotiated the end of protracted conflicts with developers in Prainha, Bosque da Freguesia and Morro Dois Irmãos obtaining environmental gains leading to the creation of new publicly owned parks with satisfactory solutions for the affected business interests. He structured the participatory Jacarepaguá Lowlands Water Council (CONSAG) with public and civil society stakeholders and the City Environmental Council (CONSEMAC).

He represented Rio de Janeiro at several international city conferences, including Berlin (95), Saitama (95), Seoul (2002), Paris (2003), Athens (2003) and Berlin (2005) and was one of the executive directors of the International Council for Local Environmental Initiatives (ICLEI) and of Metropolis (the organization of cities with over one million inhabitants).

== Commissioner for Urban Management and President of the IPP ==
He was the commissioner for urban management and president of the IPP – Pereira Passos Urban Planning Institute (2001 to 2006). His team developed the planning of 18 urban key projects for the revitalization of the Port Area. He promoted the reconstruction of the Circo Voador –solving another bitter urban conflict—facilitated the construction of Cidade do Samba, Vila Olimpica da Gamboa and of the Convention Center at Cidade Nova. He established protective policies for the neighborhoods of Jardim Botânico, Botafogo and Lagoa. He structured the City Council of Urban Policies (Compur) and created the Urban Regularization Coordination (CRU) that intervened in 61 favelas establishing rules for legal construction to integrate these communities to the city.

== Political activist ==
Alfredo Sirkis became a political activist during the military regime (1964–1985) and soon one of the leaders of the Rio high school students’ movement in 1968. In the early seventies, he took part in urban guerrilla activities against the regime, in the VPR, a Guevarist group led by former army captain Carlos Lamarca. The group was decimated and Sirkis managed to escape the country to exile. He lived in France, Chile, Argentina and Portugal from 1971 to 1979. He was in Chile during the 1973 coup and in Argentina the following year. He worked as a journalist in France and Portugal.

Back to Brazil after the 1979 amnesty, he worked as a reporter for weekly magazines, Veja and Istoé and became one of the organizers of the environmental groups that mobilized in the 1980s to defend the Amazon rainforest and to address urban ecology issues. He collaborated closely with late rubber tapper leader Chico Mendes and organized the Salve a Amazonia demonstration two weeks before his murder, in 1988.

Sirkis was one of the founders of the Brazilian Green Party, in 1986 and its national president from 1991 to 1999. In 1998, he was the green candidate in the presidential election. In 2009 and part of 2010 he was the manager of Marina Silva’s presidential campaign. He left the Green Party in 2013 and has since quit partisan activism.

== Federal Deputy ==
In 2011, Sirkis traveled to China and visited several Chinese renewable energy projects. Inspired by the experienced, upon his return to Brazil Sirkis secured funding for a solar PV worker training program in Rio. Sirkis wrote that he found the expertise of Chinese solar firms impressive and lamented that Brazil was lagging in solar energy development.

== NGO Organizer ==
He was one of the organizers of the Hiroshima Never More event (1982) in Angra dos Reis. He was the executive vice-president of Ondazul Foundation (1997–2000), whose president was the composer and singer Gilberto Gil. He organized the Mangue Vivo and Preventório reforestation projects and Recycling and Culture, that produced furniture from plastic bottles.

In 2015, he founded the Brazil Climate Center a think-tank that is also the Brazilian branch of former American Vice-president Al Gore’s Climate Reality Project. After Sirkis's death, Gore renamed an annual award given out by the Project as a tribute to Sirkis.

As a member of civil society, he coordinated the Brazilian Forum for Climate Change, chaired by the President of Brazil and integrated by approximately one hundred participants, half government, half civil society with NGOs, business, and academia.

== Death ==
Sirkis died in a car accident on 10 July 2020, at the age of 69.
