= Social Democratic Party (Brazil, 1987) =

Social Democratic Party Partido Social Democrático
- Abbreviation: PSD
- President: César Cals; Nabi Abi Chedid
- Founded: 1987
- Dissolved: 2003
- Split from: Democratic Social Party
- Merged into: Brazilian Labour Party
- Ideology: Social democracy
- Political position: Centre
- Colors: Navy blue White; Yellow

The Social Democratic Party (Portuguese: Partido Social Democrático, PSD) was a Brazilian political party founded in 1987. It was an attempt to continue the 1945 Social Democratic Party, but never could attract its old members.

The party was founded by César Cals, who had served as Minister of Mines and Energy under President João Figueiredo, and existed until 2003, when it merged into the Brazilian Labour Party (PTB).

== Electoral history ==
The "new" PSD contested its first election in 1988, electing 56 city councillors and only 2 mayors, in the municipalities of Paulínia and Teodoro Sampaio, in São Paulo. After failing in the nomination of former president Figueiredo in the 1989 presidential election, they tried to launch the also former president Jânio Quadros (who joined the party in May), but withdrawn the candidacy. The alternative was to choose the then president of the Democratic Association of Ruralists, Ronaldo Caiado, aged 39 (turning 40 during campaign) and was a rookie as candidate.

In an alliance with the inexpressive National Democratic Party (PDN), who nominated Camilo Calazans for Vice President, Caiado made many critics to his adversaries, specially Luiz Inácio Lula da Silva of the Workers' Party (PT), whom he accused to receive money from construction company Lubeca in exchange of the approval of a project in the Prefecture of São Paulo. He also promised to jail the Landless Workers' Movement members if elected, in response to the occupation in Europa farm, managed by the candidate's relatives. In the first round, Caiado garnered 488,872 votes, placing 10th and supported Fernando Collor de Mello in the second round.

In 1990, the party elected only one federal representative and two state representatives. Two years later, the party had 101 mayors, 6 member in the Chamber of Deputies and 20 member in Legislative Asseemblies, but in 1992 it reached the landmark of 20 federal representatives, what gave rise to accusations of grooming in exchange for money. The leaders in the scheme were Onaireves Moura (Paraná), Nobel Moura (Rondônia) and Itsuo Takayama (Mato Grosso), removed from office in 1993.

In the 1994 presidential election, PSD allied with the Brazilian Democratic Movement Party (PMDB) to support the candidacy of governor Orestes Quércia, who placed 4th. In state level, they won 3 seats in the Chamber of Deputies and 22 in state assemblies. The highlight went to the candidates for governor of Rio de Janeiro, where general Newton Cruz received 873,925 votes, placing 3rd. He also tried to run for mayor of Rio de Janeiro in 1996, but the party withdrew his candidacy to support Sérgio Cabral Filho, then member of the Brazilian Social Democracy Party (PSDB). This position made Newton Cruz to leave the party support Luiz Paulo Conde of the Liberal Front Party. It couldn't elect any mayor in the municipal elections.

== Last elections and merging ==
The party, led by Nabi Abi Chedid (who died in 2006) also disputed the 1998, 2000 and 2002 election, with modest results in the ballots. In 2003, it merged with the Brazilian Labour Party.
