= Avante (political party) =

Brazilian political party

Forward Avante
- President: Luis Tibé
- Founded: November 1989
- Registered: 11 October 1994
- Split from: Brazilian Labour Party
- Headquarters: Belo Horizonte, MG
- Membership (2023): ▼216,733
- Ideology: Labourism; Christian solidarism
- Political position: Centre
- Colours: Orange; Cyan
- Identification number: 70
- Federal Senate: 1 / 81
- Chamber of Deputies: 7 / 513
- Legislative Assemblies: 14 / 1,024
- Mayors: 81 / 5,568
- Municipal Chambers: 1,045 / 58,208

Party flag
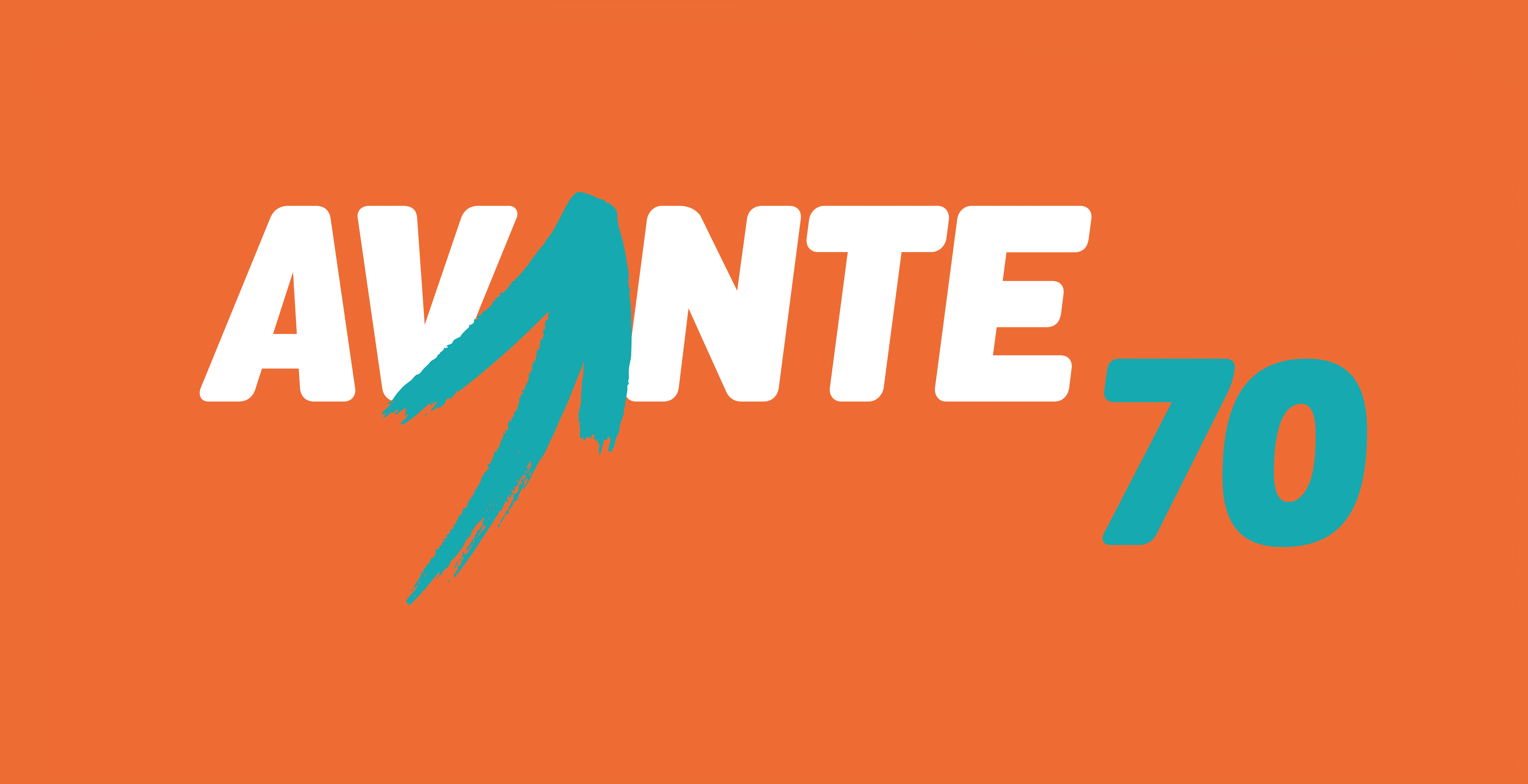

Website
- avante70.org.br

Avante (Brazilian Portuguese pronunciation: [aˈvɐ̃ntʃi], lit. 'Forward') is a centrist Brazilian political party. It was founded in 1989 by dissidents of the Brazilian Labour Party (PTB) as the Labour Party of Brazil (Partido Trabalhista do Brasil, PTdoB) and is a minor force in Brazilian politics.

== History ==
In 1998, the party chose João de Deus Barbosa as its presidential candidate; he received 200,000 votes (0.2%). In the legislative election of 2006, the party elected one representative to the Federal Chamber, and had 0.3% of the national votes (311,000 votes) for the parliament. In the legislative election of 2010 this increased to three representatives and 0.7% of the national vote (642,422 votes). At the 2014 election, the party won two seats and 0.85% of the vote in the Chamber of Deputies; it gained one seat following the defection of Silvio Costa from the Social Christian Party. The party has 534 local councillors and controls 26 mayoralties. PTdoB voted in favor of the impeachment of Dilma Rousseff.

In 2017, PTdoB changed its name to Avante, Portuguese for 'Forward'. For the Brazilian general election of 2018, Avante joined the 'Sovereign Brazil' coalition, together with the Democratic Labour Party, in support of PDT candidate Ciro Gomes. Gomes obtained 12.47% of the votes, finishing third.

The party saw an increase in their parliamentary vote share, electing seven deputies; however, it failed to elect any senators. Following the election, Avante did not join the opposition like PDT, but remained neutral towards president Jair Bolsonaro. In the 2022 election, Avante supported the left-wing candidate Luiz Inácio "Lula" da Silva (Workers' Party, PT); the party increased its representation to seven deputies in the election.

== Election results ==
=== Legislative elections ===
Election	Chamber of Deputies				Federal Senate				Role in government
Election	Votes	%	Seats	+/–	Votes	%	Seats	+/–	Role in government
1990	78,358	0.19%	0 / 502	New	N/A	N/A	0 / 81	New	Extra-parliamentary
1994	39	0.00%	0 / 513	0	N/A	N/A	0 / 81	0	Extra-parliamentary
1998	216,640	0.33%	0 / 513	0	62,086	0.10%	0 / 81	0	Extra-parliamentary
2002	168,639	0.19%	0 / 513	0	19,175	0.01%	0 / 81	0	Extra-parliamentary
2006	311,833	0.33%	1 / 513	▲1	69,923	0.08%	0 / 81	0	Coalition
2010	642,422	0.67%	3 / 513	▲2	1,480,846	0.87%	0 / 81	0	Independent
2014	812,497	0.84%	1 / 513	▼2	11,300	0.01%	0 / 81	0	Coalition
2018	1,844,048	1.88%	7 / 513	▲6	731,379	0.43%	0 / 81	0	Support
2022	2,205,176	2.00%	7 / 513	0	1,369,655	1.35%	0 / 81	0	Coalition
2026	1,807,942	1.59%	5 / 513	▼2	406,723	0.20	0 / 81	0	TBA

== See also ==
- Category:Avante (political party) politicians

Preceded by 65 - CPofB (PCdoB)	Numbers of Brazilian Official Political Parties; 70 - AVANTE	Succeeded by 77 - SOLIDARIEDADE
