= Progressive Republican Party (Brazil) =

Political party in Brazil

Progressive Republican Party Partido Republicano Progressista
- President: Ovasco Roma; Altimari Resende
- Founded: 22 November 1991
- Dissolved: 17 December 2018
- Merged into: Patriota
- Headquarters: São José do Rio Preto, Brazil
- Membership: 250,278
- Ideology: Progressive conservatism Social conservatism Republicanism; Right-libertarianism
- Political position: Centre-right to right-wing
- Colours: Dark blue

Website
- prp.org.br

The Progressive Republican Party (Portuguese: Partido Republicano Progressista, PRP) was a Brazilian political party.

It became a registered political party on 22 November 1991; its electoral number was 44. The party was created to bring together the political legacy of Ademar de Barros, former governor of the state of São Paulo.

On 17 December 2018, the PRP merged with Patriota and ceased to exist.

Preceded by 43 - GP (PV)	Numbers of Brazilian Official Political Parties; 44 - PRP (defunct)	Succeeded by 45 - BSDP (PSDB)
