= 2002 São Paulo gubernatorial election =

- 6 October 2002 (first round); 27 October 2002 (second round)
- Registered: 25,655,553
- Turnout: 21,568,214 (first round); 21,493,289 (second round)
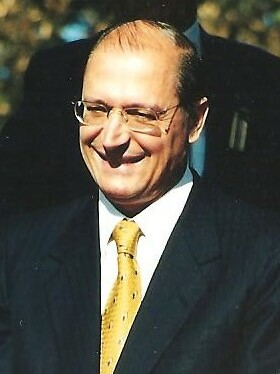

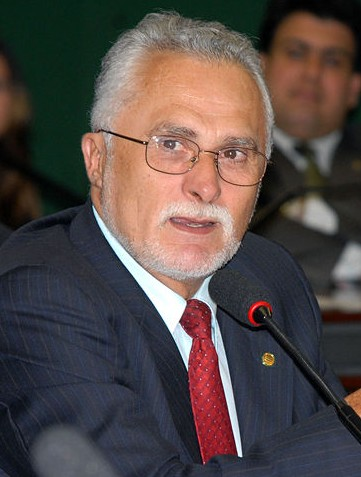
Nominee	Geraldo Alckmin	José Genoino
Party	PSDB	PT
Alliance	São Paulo em Boas Mãos	São Paulo quer Mudança
Home state	Pindamonhangaba, SP	Quixeramobim, CE
Running mate	Cláudio Lembo (PFL)	Luiz Marinho (PT)
Popular vote	12,008,819	8,470,863
Percentage	58.64%	41.36%
- Candidate with the most votes per municipality (645): Geraldo Alckmin (561 municipalities) 50%–59% (245) 60%–69% (248) 70%–79% (67) 80%–89% (Lagoinha) José Genoino (84 municipalities) 50%–59% (76) 60%–69% (8)
Governor before election
Geraldo Alckmin
PSDB
Elected Governor
Geraldo Alckmin
PSDB

2002 São Paulo Senate election
- 6 October 2002
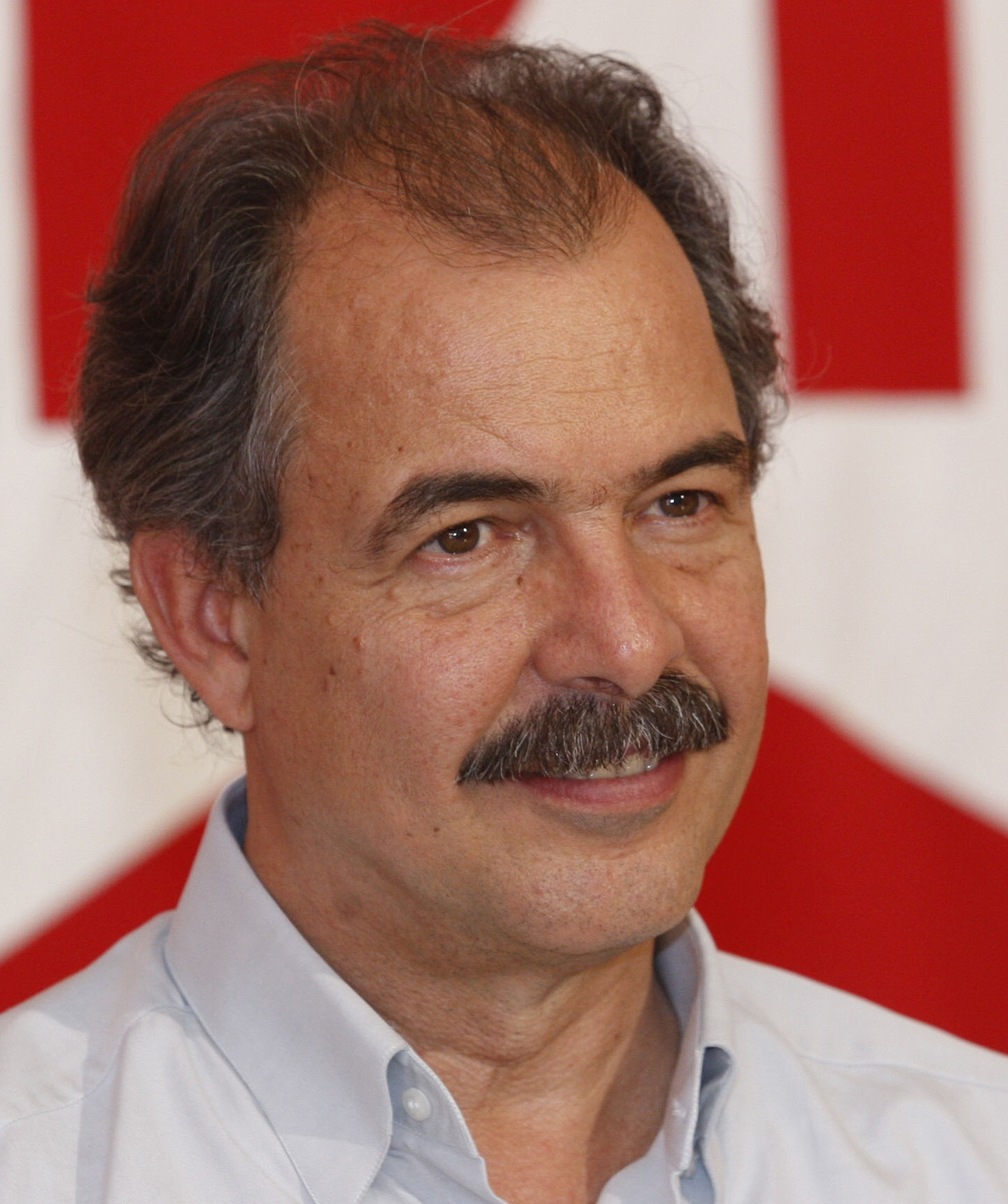

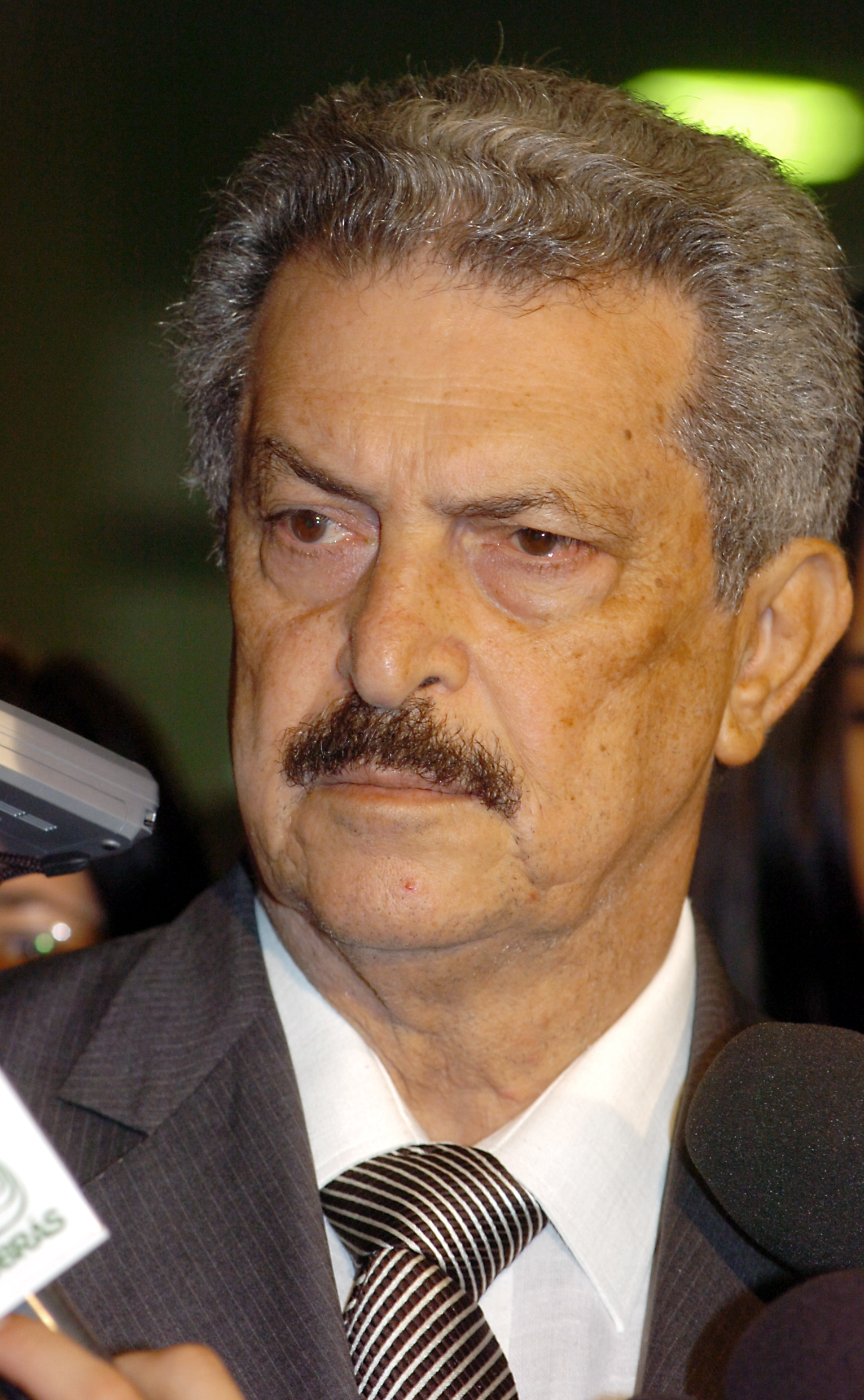
	Majority party	Minority party
Party	PT	PFL
Popular vote	10,491,345	7,278,185
Percentage	29.86%	20.71%
- Candidate with the most votes per municipality: Aloizio Mercadante; Romeu Tuma; Orestes Quércia; Zé Aníbal Cunha Bueno
Senator before election
José Serra and Romeu Tuma
Brazilian Social Democratic Party and Liberal Front Party
Elected senators
Aloizio Mercadante and Romeu Tuma
Workers' Party and Liberal Front Party

The 2002 state elections in São Paulo took place on October 6 as part of the general elections held in the Federal District and 26 states. The governor, the lieutenant governor, two senators, seventy federal deputies, and 94 state deputies were elected. Since no gubernatorial candidate received a majority of the valid votes, a runoff election was held on October 27, and, in accordance with the Constitution, the governor and vice governor-elect were to take office on January 1, 2003, for a four-year term. (Note: The inauguration of the elected lawmakers was scheduled for February 1, 2003, for federal deputies, and March 15, 2003, for state deputies.)

Mário Covas (PSDB), who was elected governor in 1994 and reelected in 1998, died in March 2001. The lieutenant governor, Geraldo Alckmin (PSDB), was sworn in as governor and ran for reelection in 2002. In the first round, Alckmin received 38.2% of the vote, beating José Genoino (PT), with 32.4%, and Paulo Maluf (PPB), with 21.3%. In the second round, Alckmin was reelected with 58.6% of the vote, receiving 3.5 million more votes than Genoino. Cláudio Lembo (PFL) was elected lieutenant governor.

In the elections for the National Congress, Aloizio Mercadante (PT) and Romeu Tuma (PFL) were elected senators with 29.8% and 20.7% of the vote, respectively. For the Chamber of Deputies, the Workers' Party (PT) elected eighteen federal deputies and the Brazilian Social Democracy Party (PSDB), eleven. Eight of the elected federal deputies were members of the Liberal Front Party (PFL), six of the Party of the Reconstruction of the National Order (PRONA), five of the Brazilian Labour Party (PTB), and five of the Brazilian Socialist Party (PSB). The Legislative Assembly of São Paulo (Alesp) was composed of 23 deputies from the PT, eighteen from the PSDB, eight from the Brazilian Progressive Party (PPB), six from the PTB, six from the PFL, five from the Popular Socialist Party (PPS), and five from the Green Party (PV), with the remaining 23 seats filled by politicians affiliated with nine other parties.

== Background ==
Mário Covas was the 55th Governor of São Paulo from January 1, 1995, to January 22, 2001, when he stepped down from office due to cancer. Since Mário Covas did not resign from office, he remained Governor on medical leave until his death on March 6, 2001. In the meantime, Geraldo Alckmin governed the state as Acting Governor.A member of the Brazilian Social Democracy Party (PSDB), Geraldo Alckmin was chosen as the party’s candidate in an effort to keep the party in power in São Paulo.

The Workers' Party (PT) opted for a ticket consisting entirely of its own members, comprising former guerrilla fighter José Genoíno and labor union leader Luiz Marinho. Paulo Maluf (PPB), the former governor of São Paulo and former mayor of the state capital, also ran for the office in an effort to return to the Palácio dos Bandeirantes.

=== Dates ===
The first round was held on October 6, 2006. The second round, meanwhile, was held on October 27, 2002.

== State gubernatorial election ==
=== Governor-elect ===
A medical doctor who graduated from the University of Taubaté (UNITAU), Geraldo Alckmin was born in Pindamonhangaba, where he headed the Department of Anesthesiology at Santa Casa de Misericórdia; in Lorena, he taught at the Salesian University Center of São Paulo and at the Santa Teresa Institute. Elected city councilman in his hometown by the Brazilian Democratic Movement (MDB) in 1972, he assumed the presidency of the City Council during that legislative term, and in 1976 he was elected mayor of Pindamonhangaba. With the restoration of the multi-party system under President João Figueiredo, he joined the PMDB and, under that party banner, was elected state representative in 1982 and federal representative in 1986. Two years later, he was one of the founders of the Brazilian Social Democracy Party (PSDB) and signed the 1988 Constitution, winning reelection as a federal deputy in 1990. He voted in favor of the impeachment of Fernando Collor de Mello in 1992, was elected vice governor of São Paulo on Mário Covas’s ticket in 1994, and reelected in 1998. As a candidate for mayor of São Paulo in 2000, he did not even make it to the runoff. Early the following year, he became interim governor following the incumbent’s removal from office, and after Covas’s death on March 6, 2001, he was confirmed as governor. Alckmin ran for reelection in 2002 and was reelected in the runoff after defeating José Genoino of the Workers’ Party (PT).

=== Vice Governor-elect ===
A lawyer born in São Paulo and a graduate of the University of São Paulo (USP), Cláudio Lembo worked at Banco Itaú, where he remained for nearly forty years. A professor at Mackenzie Presbyterian University, he served as the institution’s president. A member of National Renewal Alliance (ARENA), he served as Secretary of Extraordinary Affairs during Olavo Setúbal’s tenure as mayor of São Paulo and assumed the state presidency of the party. Defeated by Franco Montoro in the 1978 senatorial election, he returned to political life by joining the PFL. Close to Marco Maciel, he served as that politician’s chief of staff at the Ministry of Education and advised him during his tenure as Vice President of the Republic. He served the São Paulo City Hall as Secretary of Legal Affairs during Jânio Quadros’s second term and was a vice-presidential candidate on Aureliano Chaves’s ticket in 1989. Secretary of Planning during Paulo Maluf’s second term as mayor of São Paulo, he was elected lieutenant governor on Alckmin’s ticket after leaving the presidency of Mackenzie University in 2002, and four years later assumed the governorship when the incumbent resigned to run for the presidency.

=== Results ===
==== First round ====
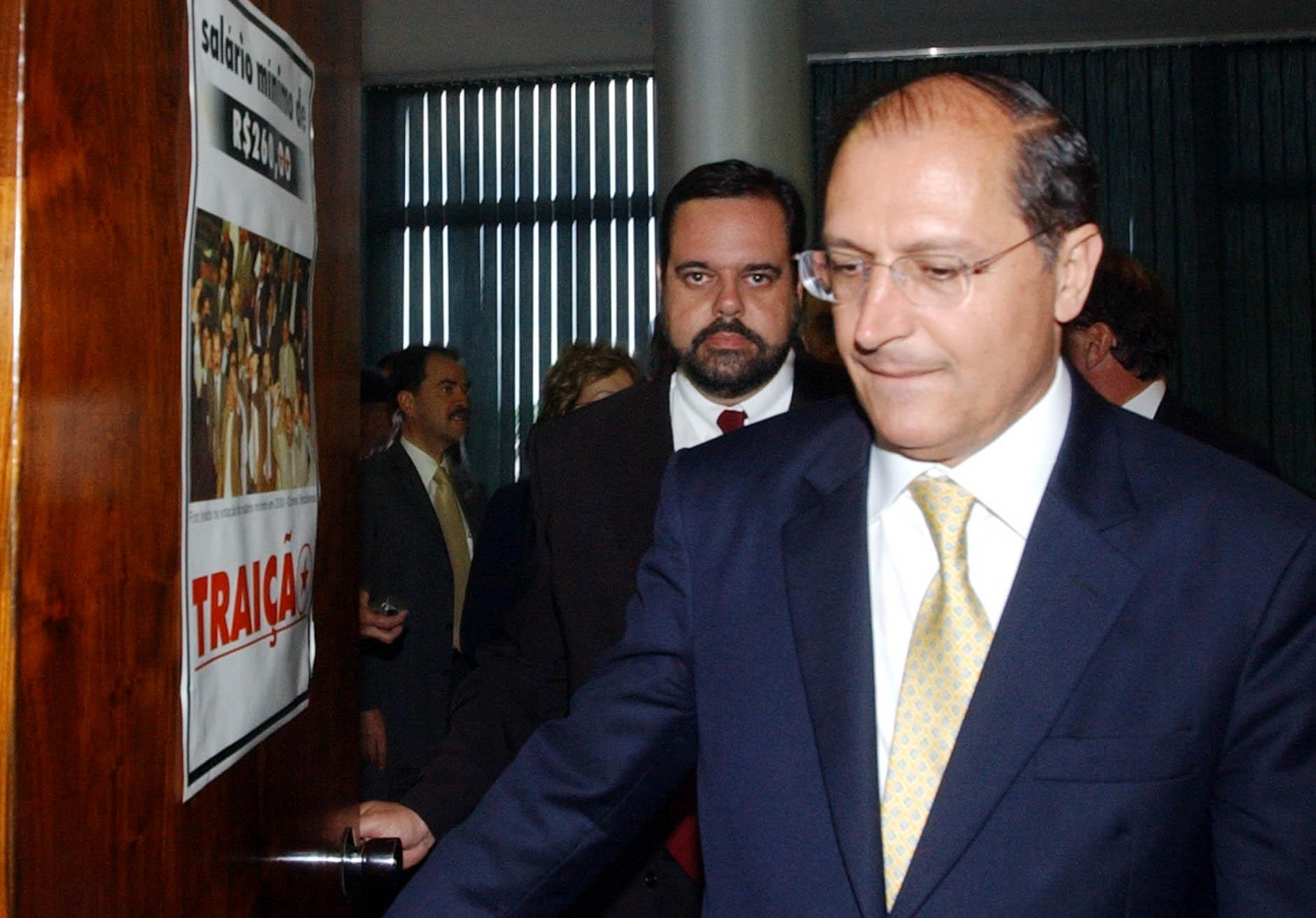
Geraldo Alckmin, the lieutenant governor who took over the governorship following the death of Mário Covas, was re-elected in 2002.

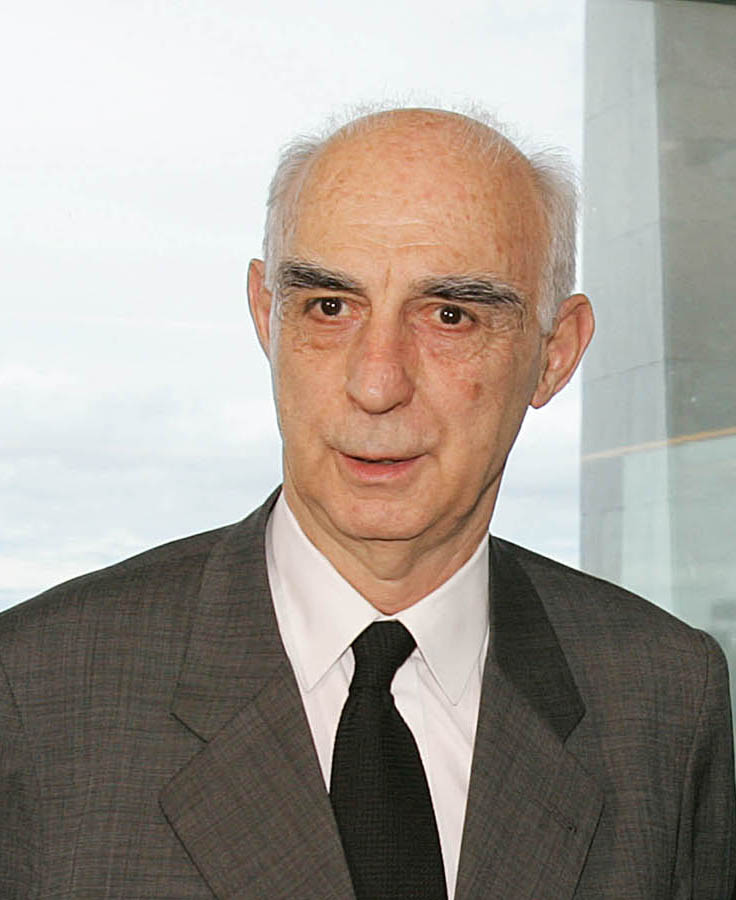
Cláudio Lembo, elected lieutenant governor.

Candidates for state governor	Candidates for lieutenant governor	Number	Coalition	Votes	Percentage
Geraldo Alckmin PSDB	Cláudio Lembo PFL	45	São Paulo em Boas Mãos (PSDB, PFL, PSD)	7.505.486	38,28%
José Genoino PT	Luiz Marinho PT	13	São Paulo quer Mudança (PT, PCdoB, PCB)	6.361.747	32,45%
Paulo Maluf PPB	Heitor Pinto Filho PPB	11	Resolve São Paulo (PPB, PL, PSDC, PTN)	4.190.706	21,37%
Carlos Apolinário PGT	Egeferson Craveiro PGT	30	São Paulo nas Mãos de Deus (PGT, PHS, PST)	703.858	3,59%
Lamartine Posella (Note: He replaced the writer Fernando Morais, who withdrew from the race for governor of São Paulo , claiming that he did not want to give Orestes Quércia any airtime.) PMDB	Alda Marco Antônio PMDB	15	—	259.317	1,32%
Carlos Roberto Pittoli PSB	Raimundo dos Santos Oliveira PSB	40	—	216.369	1,10%
Antônio Cabrera PTB	Celso Jatene PTB	14	Frente Trabalhista (PTB, PDT, PPS)	200.839	1,03%
Antonio Pinheiro Pedro PV	Cláudio Turtelli PV	43	—	52.068	0,27%
Robson Malek PRONA	Adalton Nimtz PRONA	56	—	38.545	0,20%
Dirceu Travesso PSTU	Cidinha Lamas PSTU	16	—	35.556	0,18%
Ciro Moura PTC	Eduardo Souza Costa PTC	36	Bandeira Paulista (PTC, PSC, PRP, PTdoB)	17.854	0,09%
Levy Fidelix PRTB	Luís Roberto Brunello PRTB	28	—	8.654	0,04%
Roberto Siqueira Gomes PSL	Edward Ferraz PSL	17	—	7.648	0,04%
Anaí Caproni PCO	Edinaldo Augusto PCO	29	—	4.634	0,02%
Osmar Lins PAN	Roberto Machioni PAN	26	—	3.418	0,02%

Second round

==== Second round ====
Candidates for state governor	Candidates for lieutenant governor	Number	Coalition	Votes	Percentage	Ref.
Geraldo Alckmin PSDB	Cláudio Lembo PFL	45	São Paulo em Boas Mãos (PSDB, PFL, PSD)	12.008.819	58,64%	
José Genoino PT	Luiz Marinho PT	13	São Paulo quer Mudança (PT, PCdoB, PCB)	8.470.863	41,36%	

Elected

== Elected senators ==
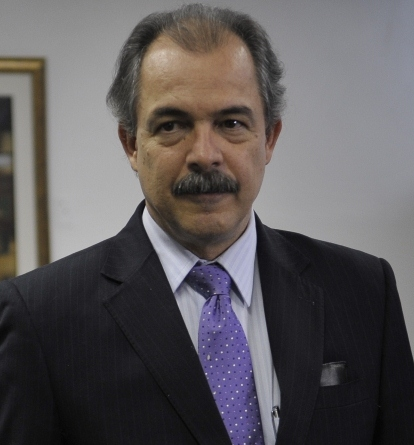
Aloizio Mercadante, elected senator in 2002.

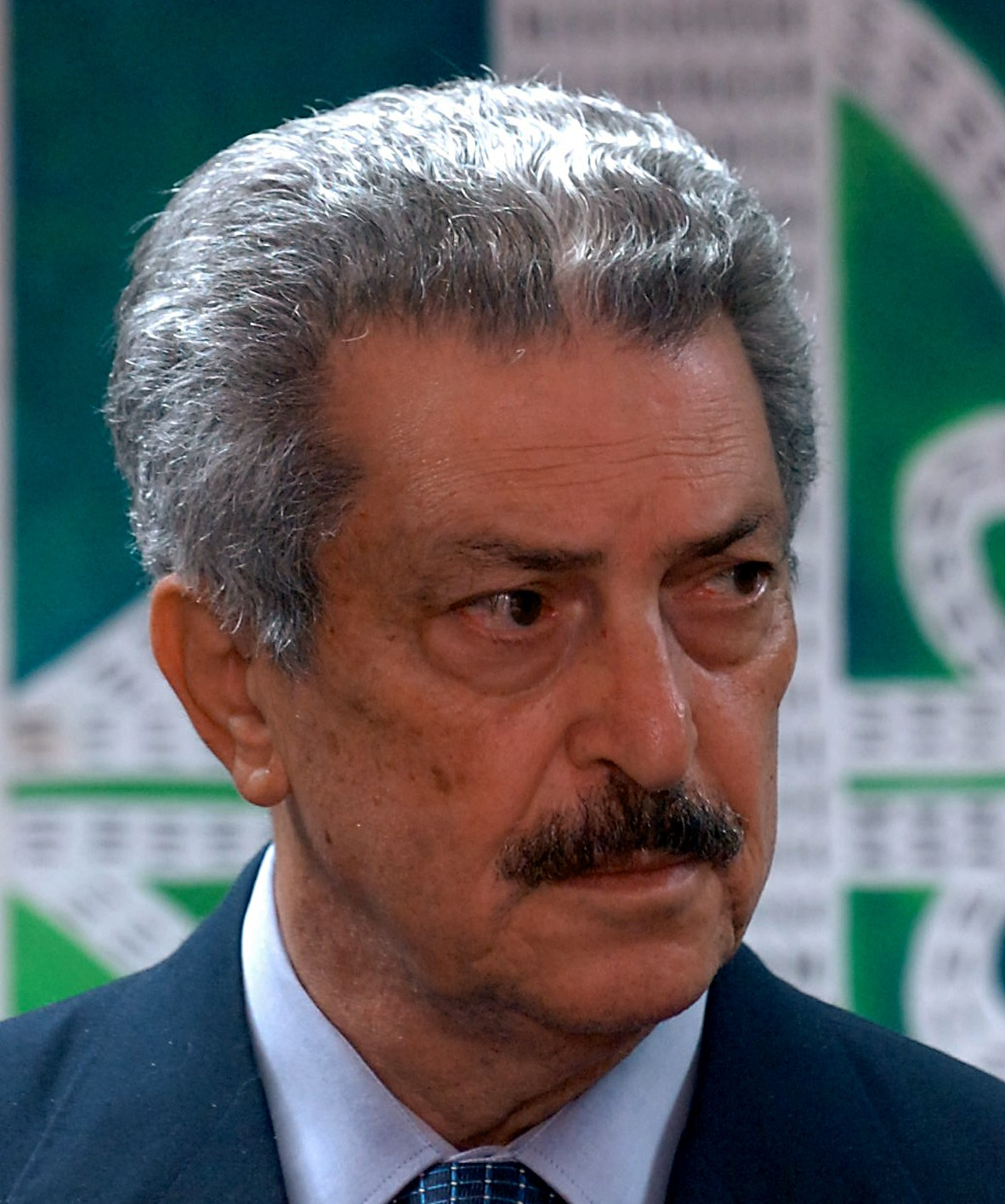
Romeu Tuma was reelected to the Senate.

=== Alozio Mercadante ===
The son of retired General Osvaldo Muniz Oliva, economist Aloizio Mercadante was born in Santos and opposed the 1964 military dictatorship while studying at the USP, from which he graduated in 1976. Two years later, he earned a master’s degree from the State University of Campinas (Unicamp) and began teaching at the Pontifical Catholic University of São Paulo (PUC-SP), heading the Department of Economics and coordinating the Research Center. He earned a Ph.D. in Economics from the University of Campinas in 1988; prior to that, he had served as president of the National Association of Higher Education Faculty (ANDES) during the João Figueiredo administration and was among the founders of the Central Única dos Trabalhadores (CUT). A member of the PT’s national executive committee, he was elected to the Chamber of Deputies in 1990, voted to initiate the impeachment proceedings against Fernando Collor in 1992, and ran as the vice-presidential candidate on Luiz Inácio Lula da Silva’s ticket in 1994, though he was not elected. In 1998, he was elected to the Chamber of Deputies.

=== Romeu Tuma ===
Born in São Paulo and holding a bachelor’s degree in law from the PUC-SP, Romeu Tuma joined the civil police in 1951 and served as a police officer, investigator, and police chief before being appointed as an advisor to Sérgio Paranhos Fleury at the Department of Political and Social Order (DOPS). When Paulo Egydio Martins was governor of São Paulo, Tuma took over the leadership of the DOPS at the behest of the Secretary of Security, Erasmo Dias. Superintendent of the Federal Police in São Paulo during the administration of President João Figueiredo, he was appointed director-general of the agency by José Sarney. Kept in office by Fernando Collor, he combined this role with that of Secretary of the Federal Revenue Service, and in 1991 he assumed one of the vice-presidencies of Interpol. With a police career that included work on the cases of Nazis Gustav Wagner and Josef Mengele and mafia boss Tommaso Buscetta, he served as special advisor to Governor Luiz Antônio Fleury Filho. A cousin of Nicolau Tuma and father of Robson Tuma, he was elected senator for the PL in 1994. After a brief stint with the Social Liberal Party (PSL), he switched to the PFL and ran unsuccessfully for mayor of São Paulo in 2000, but was re-elected to the Senate in 2002.

==== Results ====
Senatorial candidates	Candidates for alternate senator	Numbr	Coalition	Votes	Percentage
Aloizio Mercadante PT	José Giacomo Baccarin PT João Vaccari Neto PT	131	São Paulo quer Mudança (PT, PCdoB, PCB)	10.491.345	29,86%
Romeu Tuma PFL	Alfredo Cotait (Note: Following Tuma's death, he took his seat in the Senate on November 3, 2010, and remained in office until 2011.) PFL Alexandre Thiollier PFL	252	São Paulo em Boas Mãos (PSDB, PFL, PSD)	7.278.185	20,71%
Orestes Quércia PMDB	Nildo Masini PMDB Sebastião Biazzo PMDB	151	—	5.550.803	15,80%
José Aníbal PSDB	Almir Pazzianotto PSDB José Ricardo Franco PSDB	451	São Paulo em Boas Mãos (PSDB, PFL, PSD)	4.957.173	14,11%
Wagner Gomes PCdoB	Maria José Jandreice PCdoB Davi Gonçalves PCdoB	651	São Paulo quer Mudança (PT, PCdoB, PCB)	3.473.198	9,88%
Cunha Bueno PPB	Marino Pazzaglini PPB Adalberto Camargo PPB	111	Resolve São Paulo (PPB, PL, PSDC, PTN)	1.794.415	5,11%
Eliseu Gabriel PDT	Evaldo Pereira PDT Evaldo Vicentini PPS	123	Frente Trabalhista (PTB, PDT, PPS)	259.142	0,74%
José Luiz Penna PV	Carlos Gilberto PV Vera Lúcia PV	434	—	226.029	0,64%
Rubens Calvo PSB	Claudines Beltrami PSB Antônio Francisco PSB	401	—	220.738	0,63%
Willians Rafael PTB	João Zangrandi PPS Manoel Coelho PTB	147	Frente Trabalhista (PTB, PDT, PPS)	149.606	0,43%
Mohamad Said Mourad PSB	João Paulo Galvez PSB Vicente Augusto PSB	402	—	133.925	0,38%
Paulo Corrêa PRONA	Aurino Rocha PRONA Lindete Almeida PRONA	561	—	101.371	0,29%
Ademar Barros Bezerra PGT	Aziz Gabriel PGT Odyr Rodrigues PGT	301	São Paulo nas Mãos de Deus (PGT, PHS, PST)	80.617	0,23%
Mauro Puerro PSTU	Ary Blinder PSTU Marisa Mendes PSTU	161	—	75.779	0,22%
Floriano Leandrini PMDB	Sandra Aguiar PMDB Francisco Assis Rodrigues PMDB	152	—	72.909	0,21%
Thereza Ruiz PTN	João Dárcio PTN Valdemar dos Santos PTN	190	—	67.802	0,19%
José Maria Marin PSC	Dirceu Resende PRP Carlos Alberto da Silva PTdoB	200	Bandeira Paulista (PTC, PSC, PRP, PTdoB)	63.659	0,18%
José Raul Brasiliense PHS	Rubens Cascaldi PHS Antônio Carlos Inácio PHS	312	São Paulo nas Mãos de Deus (PGT, PHS, PST)	41.395	0,12%
Renato Bento Luiz PSTU	Alfredo Silva PSTU Marcus Vinícius PSTU	162	—	37.732	0,11%
Lucas Albano PMN	Iara Perali dos Santos PMN Teresinha Carvalho Dias PMN	333	—	22.934	0,07%
Paulo Fortunato PSDC	Ariovaldo Gobatti PSDC José Alfredo Machado PSDC	270	—	17.888	0,05%
Wlamisa Feltrim PCO	Afrânio Raes PCO Consuelo dos Santos PCO	291	—	6.939	0,02%
Firmino Rosa PCO	Elza Costa PCO Silvia Quirino PCO	292	—	5.327	0,01%
Carlos Henrique Darde PRTB	Daniel Oltramari PRTB Aldinéa Fidelix PRTB	281	—	4.845	0,01%
José Costa PAN	Ivonete Pasternack PAN João Rezende Neto PAN	266	—	4.439	0,01%

Elected

== Elected federal deputies ==
The list includes the elected candidates along with additional information from the Chamber of Deputies. Enéas Carneiro, of the Party of the Reconstruction of the National Order (PRONA), was elected to the Chamber of Deputies with 1.5 million votes. Enéas thus became the most-voted-for federal deputy in Brazilian history up to that point. His vote effectively elected five other deputies from his party, who together received 20,235 votes.

Federal deputies electeds	Party	Votes	Percentage	Birthplace
Enéas Carneiro	PRONA	1.573.642	8,02%	Rio Branco
José Dirceu (Note: He initially took a leave of absence from his parliamentary seat to serve as Chief of Staff, but as soon as he left the Executive Branch, his seat was revoked on December 1, 2005, for breach of parliamentary decorum, and Mariângela Duarte was subsequently appointed to fill the vacancy.)	PT	556.768	2,83%	Passa Quatro
José Eduardo Cardozo	PT	303.033	1,54%	São Paulo
Celso Russomanno	PPB	261.635	1,33%	São Paulo
Vicente Paulo da Silva	PT	254.221	1,29%	Santa Cruz
Michel Temer	PMDB	252.229	1,28%	Tietê
Aloysio Nunes	PSDB	250.936	1,27%	São José do Rio Preto
Gilberto Nascimento	PSB	240.664	1,22%	São Paulo
Gilberto Kassab (Note: Elected deputy mayor of São Paulo in 2004, he resigned from his parliamentary seat in favor of Paulo Kobayashi.)	PFL	234.509	1,19%	São Paulo
José Pinotti	PMDB	209.105	1,06%	São Paulo
Luíza Erundina	PSB	207.396	1,05%	Uiraúna
Salvador Zimbaldi	PSDB	199.930	1,01%	Campinas
João Paulo Cunha	PT	196.945	1,00%	Caraguatatuba
Walter Feldman	PSDB	186.216	0,94%	São Paulo
José Mentor	PT	182.956	0,93%	Santa Isabel
Vanderval Santos	PL	177.456	0,90%	Rio de Janeiro
Robson Tuma	PFL	175.366	0,89%	São Paulo
Arnaldo Madeira	PSDB	175.312	0,89%	Santos
Iara Bernardi	PT	166.138	0,84%	Sorocaba
Alberto Goldman (Note: Elected lieutenant governor of São Paulo in 2006, he resigned from his parliamentary seat in the final month of the legislative session to make way for Xico Graziano.)	PSDB	165.381	0,84%	São Paulo
Telma de Souza	PT	161.198	0,82%	Santos
Carlos Sampaio	PSDB	160.963	0,82%	Campinas
Valdemar Costa Neto (Note: He resigned from his parliamentary seat on August 1, 2005, and Fernando Estima was subsequently appointed to the position.)	PL	158.510	0,80%	São Paulo
Ângela Guadagnin	PT	153.931	0,78%	Rio de Janeiro
Jefferson Campos	PSB	153.622	0,78%	Ourinhos
Corauci Sobrinho	PFL	149.971	0,78%	Ribeirão Preto
Luiz Eduardo Greenhalgh	PT	147.819	0,75%	São Paulo
Mendes Thame	PSDB	143.313	0,73%	Piracicaba
Professor Luizinho	PT	142.812	0,72%	Cândido Mota
Júlio Semeghini	PSDB	138.907	0,70%	Fernandópolis
Arlindo Chinaglia	PT	136.402	0,69%	Serra Azul
Zulaiê Cobra	PSDB	134.776	0,69%	São José do Rio Pardo
Aldo Rebelo	PCdoB	134.241	0,68%	Viçosa
Ricardo Berzoini	PT	132.176	0,67%	Juiz de Fora
Delfim Neto	PPB	131.399	0,67%	São Paulo
Devanir Ribeiro	PT	130.574	0,66%	Getulina
Milton Monti	PMDB	130.235	0,66%	São Manuel
Paulo Lima	PFL	130.158	0,66%	Presidente Prudente
Neuton Lima	PFL	127.677	0,65%	São Paulo
Antonio Carlos Pannunzio	PSDB	125.570	0,64%	Sorocaba
Orlando Fantazzini	PT	123.163	0,63%	Guarulhos
Bispo João Batista	PFL	121.255	0,61%	Rio de Janeiro
Edna Macedo	PTB	118.474	0,60%	Rio das Flores
Dimas Ramalho	PPS	116.581	0,59%	Taquaritinga
Luiz Carlos Santos	PFL	116.286	0,59%	Araxá
Luciano Zica	PT	115.341	0,59%	Biquinhas
Lobbe Neto	PSDB	114.586	0,58%	São Paulo
Roberto Gouveia	PT	113.494	0,57%	Ituiutaba
Ivan Valente	PT	110.034	0,56%	São Paulo
Marcos Roberto Abramo	PFL	109.468	0,55%	Porto Ferreira
Vadão Gomes	PPB	108.533	0,55%	Populina
Luiz de Medeiros	PL	108.474	0,55%	Eirunepé
Vicente Cascione	PSB	108.094	0,55%	Santos
Jovino Cândido	PV	99.357	0,50%	Florínea
Ricardo Izar	PTB	99.320	0,50%	São Paulo
Durval Orlato	PT	95.591	0,48%	Jundiaí
Jamil Murad	PCdoB	95.301	0,48%	José Bonifácio
Nelson Marquezelli	PTB	89.531	0,45%	Pirassununga
João Herrmann Neto	PPS	87.090	0,44%	Campinas
Arnaldo Faria de Sá	PTB	86.490	0,44%	São Paulo
Claudio Magrão	PPS	86.108	0,43%	Osasco
Luiz Antônio Fleury Filho	PTB	82.429	0,42%	São José do Rio Preto
Hélio Santos (Note: Elected mayor of Campinas in 2004, he resigned from his parliamentary seat in favor of Ary Kara.)	PDT	74.213	0,37%	Corumbá
Dr. Evilásio (Note: Elected mayor of Taboão da Serra in 2004, he resigned from his parliamentary seat in favor of Edinho Montemor.)	PSB	63.710	0,32%	Cabaceiras
Marcelo Ortiz	PV	36.486	0,18%	Penápolis
Amauri Gasques	PRONA	18.421	0,09%	São Paulo
Irapuan Teixeira	PRONA	673	zero	Porto Alegre
Elimar Damasceno	PRONA	484	zero	Santa Maria do Suaçuí
Ildeu Araujo	PRONA	382	zero	Serrania
Vanderlei Assis	PRONA	275	zero	Rio de Janeiro

== Elected state deputies ==
A total of 94 state representatives were elected to the São Paulo State Legislative Assembly (Alesp).

Elected state representatives	Party	Vote(s)	Percentage	Birthplace
Havanir Nimtz	PRONA	682.219	3,48%	Itabaiana
Conte Lopes	PPB	207.006	1,06%	São Paulo
Afanásio Jazadji	PFL	157.602	0,80%	São Paulo
Edson Aparecido	PSDB	148.650	0,76%	São Paulo
Campos Machado	PTB	145.647	0,74%	Cerqueira César
Rodrigo Garcia	PFL	137.738	0,70%	Tanabi
Vaz de Lima	PSDB	132.427	0,68%	Fernandópolis
Hamilton Pereira	PT	131.637	0,67%	Sorocaba
Waldir Agnello	PSB	130.069	0,67%	Santos
Pedro Tobias	PSDB	123.960	0,63%	Bekarzla
Ricardo Tripoli	PSDB	120.746	0,62%	São Paulo
Antonio Mentor	PT	120.470	0,62%	São Paulo
Ênio Tatto	PT	118.233	0,61%	Frederico Westphalen
Edson Ferrarini	PTB	144.597	0,59%	São Paulo
Eli Corrêa Filho	PFL	114.039	0,58%	São Paulo
Carlinhos Almeida	PT	111.602	0,57%	Santa Rita de Jacutinga
Célia Leão	PSDB	109.741	0,56%	São Paulo
Celino Cardoso	PSDB	108.274	0,55%	Terra Rica
Mauro Menuchi	PT	107.248	0,55%	Caieiras
Maria Lúcia Prandi	PT	106.444	0,54%	Potirendaba
João Caramez	PSDB	104.649	0,53%	Itapevi
Vanderlei Macris	PSDB	104.223	0,53%	Americana
Duarte Nogueira	PSDB	103.851	0,53%	Ribeirão Preto
Emídio de Souza	PT	102.331	0,52%	Inúbia Paulista
Analice Fernandes	PSDB	100.134	0,51%	Jales
Roberto Morais	PPS	97.372	0,50%	Charqueada
Geraldo Tenuta Filho	PSDB	96.857	0,50%	São Paulo
Simão Pedro Chiovetti	PT	94.089	0,48%	Tapira
Renato Simões	PT	93.886	0,48%	Campinas
Ítalo Cardoso	PT	91.206	0,47%	Araçuaí
Edmir Chedid	PFL	88.021	0,45%	Campinas
Vicente Cândido	PT	86.901	0,44%	Bom Jesus do Galho
Donisete Braga	PT	86.877	0,44%	Flora Rica
Alberto Hiar	PSDB	86.474	0,44%	São Paulo
Gonzaga	PSDB	86.366	0,44%	Tatuí
Adriano Diogo	PT	85.515	0,44%	São Paulo
Valdomiro Lopes	PPB	84.918	0,43%	São José do Rio Preto
Ary Fossen	PSDB	84.354	0,43%	Jundiaí
Wagner Salustiano	PPB	82.793	0,42%	São Paulo
Cândido Vaccarezza	PT	82.793	0,42%	Senhor do Bonfim
Rodolfo da Costa e Silva	PSDB	81.576	0,42%	Goiânia
Sidney Beraldo	PSDB	81.328	0,42%	São João da Boa Vista
Vanderlei Siraque	PT	81.089	0,42%	Santa Cruz do Rio Pardo
Jorge Caruso	PMDB	80.502	0,41%	São Paulo
José Zico Prado	PT	77.707	0,40%	Macaubal
Baleia Rossi	PMDB	77.641	0,40%	São Paulo
Arnaldo Jardim	PPS	76.708	0,39%	Altinópolis
Mário Reali	PT	75.656	0,39%	São Paulo
Maria Lúcia Amary	PSDB	75.456	0,39%	São Paulo
Sebastião Almeida	PT	73.864	0,38%	Guaporema
Benedito Roberto Alves	PTB	73.059	0,37%	Taubaté
Souza Santos	PL	72.635	0,37%	Nova Londrina
Milton Vieira	PFL	70.781	0,36%	Iepê
Geraldo Vinholi	PDT	69.927	0,36%	Itápolis
Marquinho Tortorello	PPS	69.440	0,36%	São Joaquim da Barra
Ana do Carmo	PT	67.752	0,35%	São Paulo
Vitor Sapienza	PPS	67.531	0,34%	São Paulo
Ana Maria Martins	PCdoB	67.278	0,34%	São Paulo
José Caldini Crespo	PFL	67.027	0,34%	Sorocaba
Maria de Jesus	PTN	66.067	0,34%	São Paulo
Marcelo Cândido (Note: He resigned from office in favor of his alternate, Carlos Neder, upon being elected mayor of Suzano in 2004.)	PT	65.611	0,34%	Marília
José Carlos Stangarlini	PSDB	65.478	0,33%	São Paulo
Romeu Tuma Júnior	PPS	63.523	0,33%	São Paulo
Rafael Silva	PSB	62.498	0,32%	Jardinópolis
Paschoal Thomeu	PTB	61.646	0,31%	São Paulo
Fausto Figueira	PT	61.387	0,31%	São Paulo
Roque Barbiere	PTB	61.092	0,31%	Coroados
Beth Sahão	PT	60.042	0,31%	Urupês
Adilson Rossi	PTB	60.019	0,31%	Itatiba
Rogério Nogueira	PDT	59.097	0,30%	Indaiatuba
Vinícius Camarinha	PSB	58.409	0,30%	Marília
José Dilson de Carvalho	PDT	58.198	0,30%	São Paulo
Tião Arcanjo	PT	57.174	0,29%	Campinas
Luiz Carlos Gondim	PV	56.967	0,29%	Fortaleza
Nivaldo Santana Silva	PCdoB	56.708	0,29%	São Paulo
Ubiratan Guimarães	PPB	56.155	0,29%	São Paulo
Aldo Demarchi	PPB	55.995	0,29%	Rio Claro
Antônio Salim Curiati	PPB	54.333	0,28%	Avaré
Marcelo Siqueira Bueno	PDT	52.508	0,27%	São Paulo
Orlando Morando	PSB	50.400	0,26%	São Bernardo do Campo
Gilson de Souza	PPB	48.723	0,25%	Delfinópolis
Artur Alves Pinto	PL	45.732	0,23%	São Paulo
Rosmary Corrêa	PMDB	44.648	0,23%	São Paulo
Edson Gomes	PPB	43.821	0,22%	Fernandópolis
Zuza Abdul Massih	PRP	43.716	0,22%	Beirute
Geraldo Lopes	PMDB	43.017	0,22%	São Miguel do Anta
José Afonso Lobato	PV	41.334	0,21%	Redenção da Serra
Paulo César Neme	PV	39.154	0,20%	Cotia
José Bittencourt	PGT	35.778	0,18%	Tobias Barreto
Giba Marson	PV	34.895	0,18%	São Bernardo do Campo
Ricardo Castilho	PV	28.662	0,15%	Glicério
Ahmad Said Mourad	PRONA	13.137	0,07%	São Paulo
Paulo Sérgio Rodrigues Alves	PRONA	11.616	0,06%	Guarulhos
Adilson Barroso	PRONA	9.928	0,05%	Leme do Prado
