= Tapira =

Tapira may refer to:

== Places ==
- Tapira, Minas Gerais, Brazil
- Tapira, Paraná, Brazil

== Other uses ==
- Tapira, an alternative name for Tapirira
