= Milton Monti =

Brazilian economist and politician

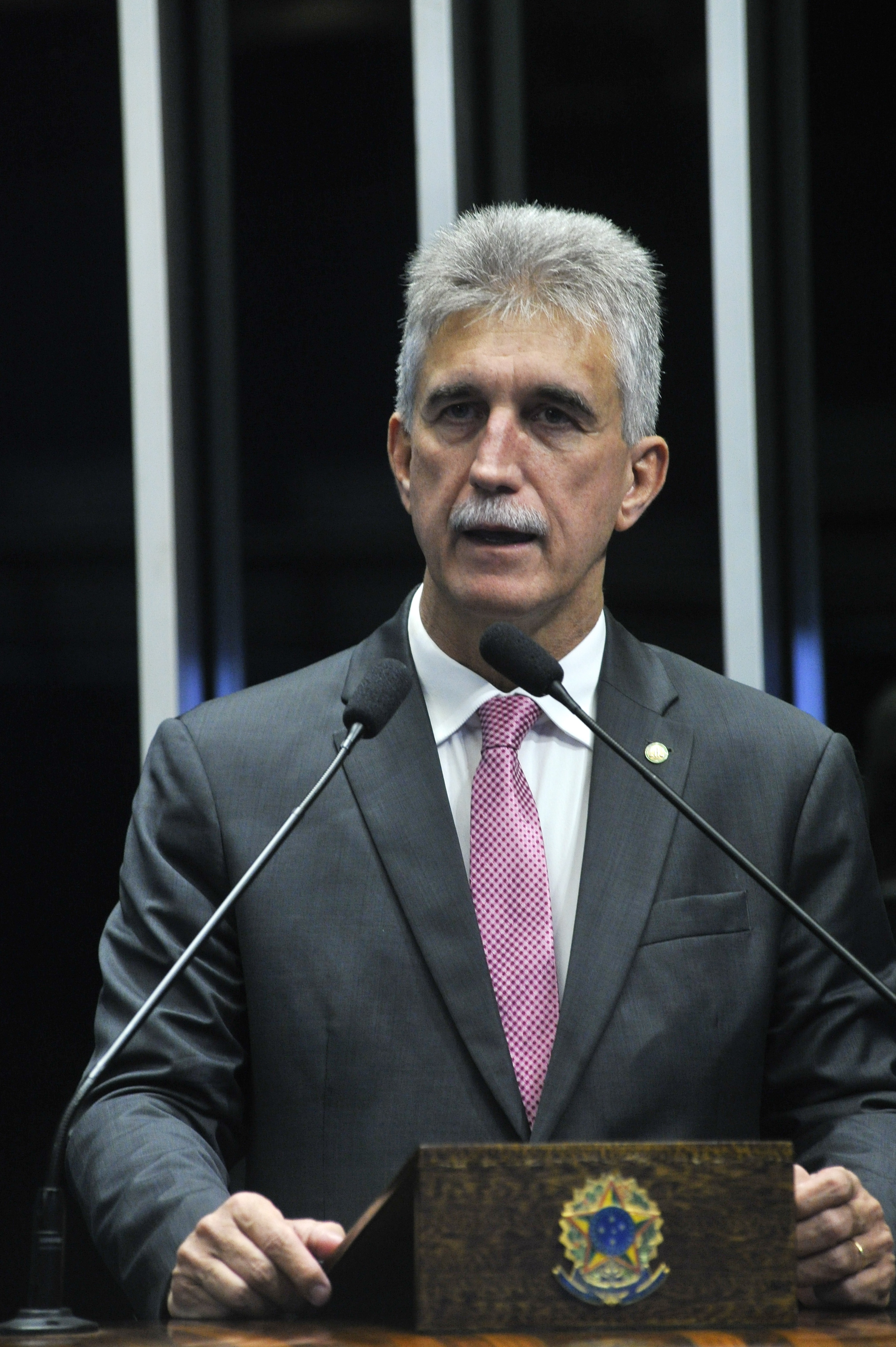

Federal Deputy for São Paulo
- In office 1 February 1995 – 1 February 2019

State Deputy of São Paulo
- In office 1 January 1991 – 1 January 1995

Mayor of São Manuel
- In office 1 January 1983 – 1 January 1989

Personal details
- Born: July 11, 1961 (age 65) São Manuel, São Paulo, Brazil
- Party: PSD (2022–present)
- Other political affiliations: PMDB (1980–2002); PL (2002–2006); PL (2006–2021)
- Profession: Economist

Milton Antônio Casquel Monti (June 11, 1961) is a Brazilian economist and politician affiliated with the Social Democratic Party (PSD). He served as a federal deputy for São Paulo for five terms.

== Biography ==
=== First years and education ===
Milton was born in the town of São Manuel, in the interior of São Paulo, in 1961. In Botucatu, a city neighboring São Manuel, he earned a degree in economics from the Integrated Colleges of Botucatu (Unifac).

=== Politics ===
While studying economics in Botucatu and running an accounting firm, Milton ran for mayor of São Manuel in 1982. A member of the Brazilian Democratic Movement (MDB), at the age of 21, he was elected after receiving 5421 votes, becoming the youngest mayor ever elected in Brazil up to that point. He served as mayor of the city until 1988.

During the administration of Luiz Antônio Fleury Filho as governor of São Paulo, Milton served as state secretary of Labor Relations from 1992 to 1994. He was elected to the São Paulo State Legislature in 1990, securing a seat in the Legislative Assembly of São Paulo (Alesp). In 1994, he was reelected to the position, where he went on to become the PMDB's leader in the assembly.

In 1998, he ran for federal deputy from São Paulo and was elected after receiving more than 95,000 votes. In 2002, he was re-elected to the position after receiving more than 130,000 votes. After his reelection, he left the PMDB and joined the Liberal Party (PL). In 2006, as a member of the Republican Party (PR), he was elected to a new term in Brasília. In October 2008, he placed life-size cardboard cutouts bearing his likeness throughout the Chamber's plenary hall, each bearing the slogan “Milton Monti for President: You’re in Charge,” and in December he officially announced his candidacy for the presidency of the Chamber. Shortly thereafter, under pressure from his party, he was forced to withdraw his candidacy in order to support that of Michel Temer (PMDB).

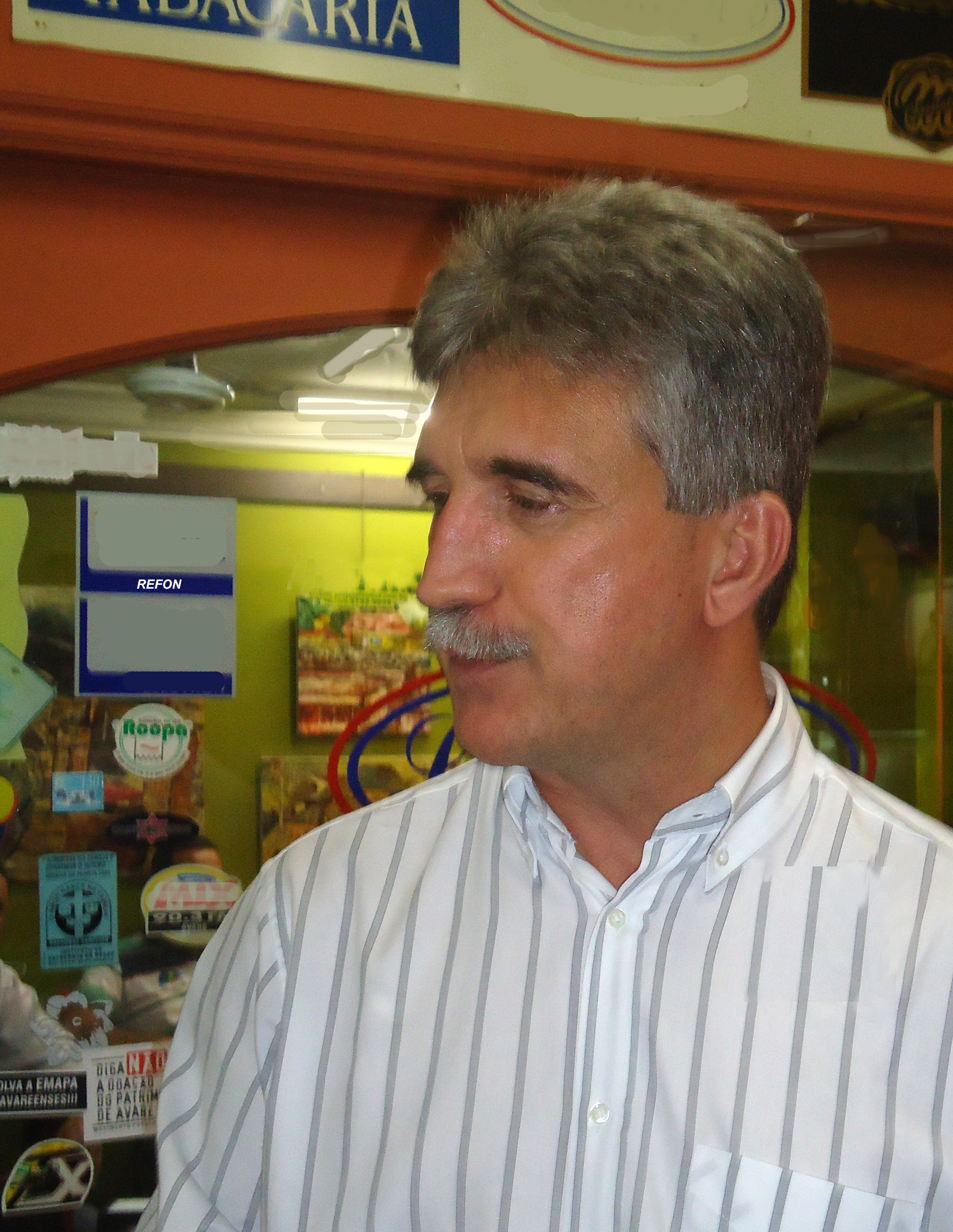
Monti during a visit to Avaré in 2010.

In 2010, he was re-elected to the position. In 2014, he was elected to a fifth term in Brasília. During his fifth term, he voted in favor of the impeachment proceedings against Dilma Rousseff. During Michel Temer's administration, he voted in favor of the constitutional amendment establishing a public spending cap. In April 2017, he supported the Labor Reform. In August 2017, he voted against the motion calling for an investigation into then-President Michel Temer, helping to dismiss the complaint filed by the Federal Public Prosecutor's Office. In the session on October 25, 2017, the congressman once again voted against continuing the investigation of then-President Michel Temer, who was accused of obstruction of justice and criminal conspiracy. The result of the vote spared Michel Temer from an investigation by the Supreme Federal Court (STF).

In 2018, he ran again for the office of Federal Deputy, receiving 55,125 votes but failing to win reelection. Following President Jair Bolsonaro’s joining the Liberal Party (PL), Monti announced his resignation from the party. At the time, Monti stated that “the party is heading in the direction of a far-right party, and I am a centrist.” Subsequently, Monti joined the Social Democratic Party (PSD), with his membership form signed by Gilberto Kassab. In 2022, he ran for office under the new party's banner but was not elected. In the 2022 presidential election, he expressed support for the ticket consisting of Luiz Inácio Lula da Silva (PT) and Geraldo Alckmin (PSB). He has served as Barueri's Secretary of Health since 2023.

==== Electoral performance ====
Year	Election	Office	Party	Votes	Result	Ref.
1982	São Manuel municipal	Mayor of São Manuel	PMDB	5 421	Elected	
1990	São Paulo state	State deputy	PMDB	22 895	Elected	
1994	São Paulo state	State deputy	PMDB	40 696	Elected	
1998	São Paulo state	Federal deputy	PMDB	97 080	Elected	
2002	São Paulo state	Federal deputy	PMDB	130 235	Elected	
2006	São Paulo state	Federal deputy	PR	126 940	Elected	
2010	São Paulo state	Federal deputy	PR	131 654	Elected	
2014	São Paulo state	Federal deputy	PR	115 492	Elected	
2018	São Paulo state	Federal deputy	PR	55 125	Not elected	
2022	São Paulo state	Federal deputy	PSD	35 440	Not elected	

== Personal life ==
He is the son of Maria do Carmo Casquel Monti and Milton Monti, who served as a city councilman in São Manuel. He is married to businesswoman Liliana Julieta Gerzely da Silva Mont, with whom he has three children. He identifies as Catholic. He is a São Paulo FC fan.
