= Nova Londrina =

Coordinates: 22°45′S 53°00′W

- Municipality
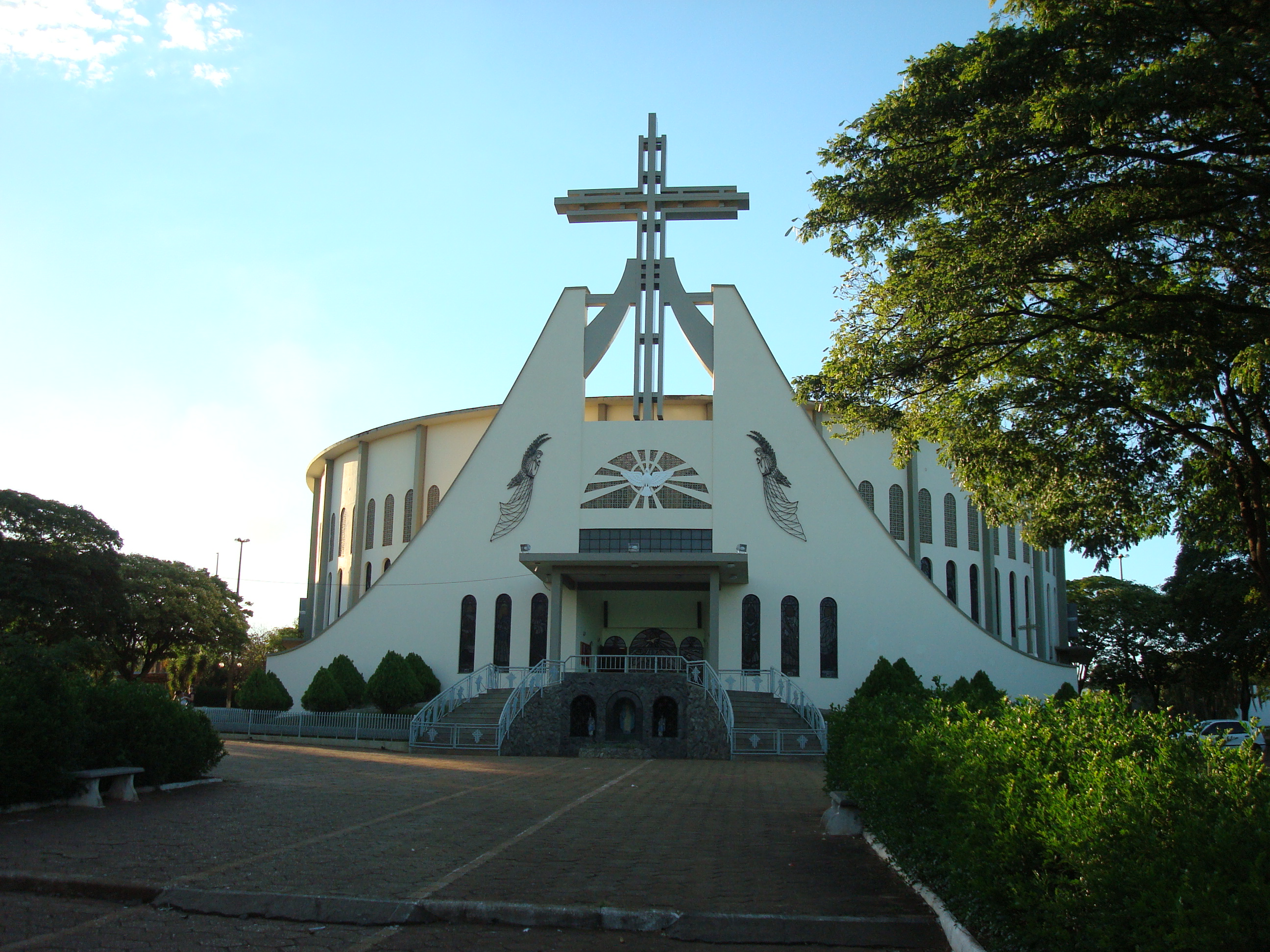

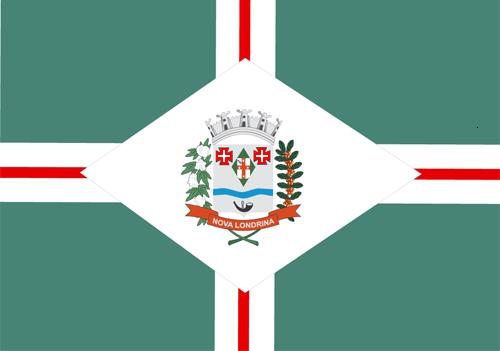
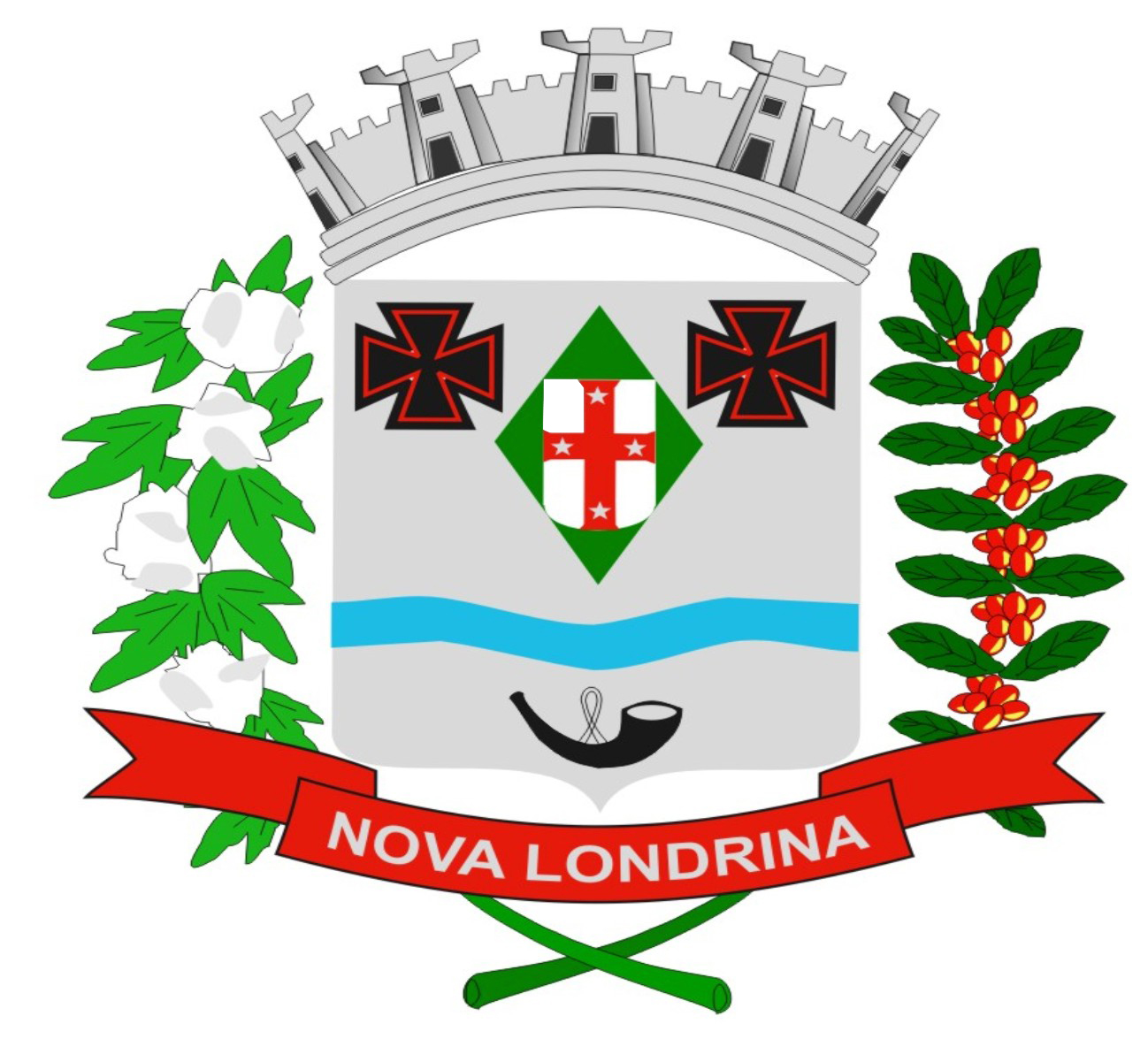
- Flag Coat of arms
- Nickname: Rainha do Noroeste
- Interactive map of Nova Londrina
- Country: Brazil
- Region: Southern
- State: Paraná
- Mesoregion: Noroeste Paranaense

Population (2022)
  - Total: 12,923
- Time zone: UTC−3 (BRT)
  - Summer (DST): UTC-3 (GMT)
- Postal code: 87970-000

Nova Londrina is a municipality in the state of Paraná in the Southern Region of Brazil.

Nova Londrina received many Germans and Italians who worked on agricultural farms. The city borders the municipalities of Diamante do Norte, Itaúna do sul, Marilena, Loanda, Guairaçá, Terra Rica, and the state of São Paulo.

== History ==
Nova Londrina was founded on October the 20th, 1952 by a real state company owned by Armando Valentim Chiamulera, Silvestre Dresch, Ewaldir Bordin, Leopoldo Lauro Bender, and Salin Zaidan. It was officially made a municipality on November 26, 1954. Prior to its foundation, a number of colonization attempts were made in the area, including land purchases between 1947 and 1950. Its first mayor was Avellino Antonio Colla.
