= Zulaiê Cobra =

Brazilian lawyer and politician (born 1943)

Zulaiê Cobra GOMM
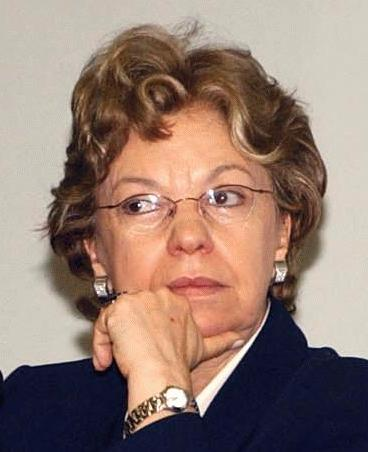
- Cobra in 2004

Federal deputy for São Paulo
- In office 1 February 1995 – 1 February 2007

Councillor of São Paulo
- In office 1 January 1993 – 1 February 1995

Personal details
- Born: Zulaiê Cobra Ribeiro; November 18, 1943 (age 82) São José do Rio Pardo, São Paulo, Brazil
- Party: PSD (2011–present)
- Other political affiliations: PMDB (1986–1988) PSDB (1988–2007) PHS (2007–2009) Democrats (2009–2011)
- Education: Pontifical Catholic University of São Paulo
- Occupation: Lawyer; politician
- Awards: Order of Military Merit
- Website: zulaiecobra.com.br

Zulaiê Cobra Ribeiro GOMM (born 18 November 1943) is a Brazilian lawyer, television presenter, and politician for the Social Democratic Party (PSD). For the Brazilian Social Democracy Party (PSDB), she was a federal deputy for São Paulo for three terms, as well as a councillor of the city of São Paulo.

== Career ==
Cobra graduated in law from the Pontifical Catholic University of São Paulo, where she studied from 1965 until 1969. She was the first woman elected to the Council of the Order of Attorneys of Brazil in the São Paulo section (OAB/SP). She was a candidate for vice-president of OAB/SP on the ticket headed by José Roberto Batochio, who lost the election.

Cobra presented the television program Direito da Mulher on TV Record from 1983 to 1985, when she went to Rede Globo to present TV Mulher. In 1987 she began presenting the program SOS Mulher, on TV Manchete.

In 1986 she was a candidate for constituent federal deputy of São Paulo for the Brazilian Democratic Movement, obtaining more than 26 thousand votes, but was not elected. She actively participated in the founding of the Brazilian Social Democracy Party in 1988, when she became close to then-senator Mário Covas. In 1990, she was a candidate for vice-governor of São Paulo, on the ticket headed by Covas, but the election was won by Luiz Antônio Fleury Filho.

In 1992, Cobra sought the PSDB candidacy for mayor of São Paulo, but withdrew her name at the convention, making room for Fábio Feldmann. In the 1992 municipal election, she was elected councillor of the city of São Paulo.

In 1994 she was elected federal deputy for the PSDB, having been re-elected twice more by the same party. In 1998, with more than 60 thousand votes, she was the first substitute for federal deputy, having soon assumed the mandate due to the leaves of parliamentarians from São Paulo. In the same year, with the death of deputy Franco Montoro, she definitively assumed the mandate of federal deputy.

With more than 120 thousand votes, Cobra was re-elected federal deputy by the PSDB of São Paulo in 2002. In the same legislature she was elected president of the Chamber's Foreign Relations and National Defense Committee. In 2003, she was admitted by President Luiz Inácio Lula da Silva to the Order of Military Merit in the rank of special Grand Officer.

During her time in the Chamber of Deputies, Cobra was president of the Permanent Committee on Foreign Relations and National Defense and also of the Special Committee of Constitutional Amendment Bill (PEC) nº 534/02 on Municipal Guards; first vice-president of the Special Commission on the UN Convention against Corruption; second vice-president of the Special Commission on Nepotism; third vice-president of the Permanent Constitution and Justice and Drafting Committee; rapporteur for the Reform of the Judiciary in the Federal Chamber and also for the Special Commission PEC nº 96/92 on Modifications in the Structure of the Judiciary. She was furthermore holder and head of various other committees and commissions.

In 2006, Cobra was a candidate for the first substitute senator on the ticket headed by Guilherme Afif Domingos in the coalition of the PSDB and the Liberal Front Party (PFL). For not being able to get a position in the party and with Afif's defeat to Eduardo Suplicy, she left the party, criticizing the weak opposition it made to the then-governing Workers' Party.

Until May 2016, Cobra presented the program A Hora É Agora, on Rádio Globo AM in São Paulo, alongside radio host Rony Magrini, who succeeded her in the presentation. She is one of the lawyers representing businessman Pablo Russel Rocha, convicted in 2016 of a triple homicide committed in 1998. Selma Heloísa Artigas da Silva died after being dragged for around two kilometers through the streets of Ribeirão Preto, with his left arm tied with the seat belt of the businessman's car. Selma was 22 years old, the mother of two children and pregnant with her third. The defense appealed to the Court of Justice so that Pablo could appeal freely. Therefore, Pablo was released after a week.

== Personal life ==
Cobra is the daughter of Manuel Gonçalves Ribeiro and Maria Amélia Cobra. She is the widow of economist José Maria Arbex, who died in a car accident in 1988. With him, she had three children: Fabrício, Sergei and Thiago. She is the sister of physical trainer Nuno Cobra.

== Honours ==
Honours
Ribbon bar	Honour	Country	Date	Source
Order of Military Merit	Grand Officer of the Order of Military Merit	Brazil	2003	
