= Ary Kara =

Brazilian politician and sports executive (1942–2019)

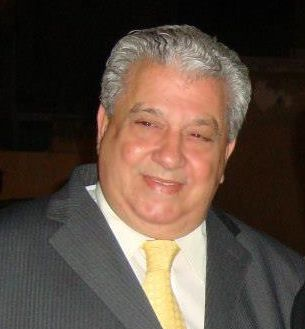

Councillor of Taubaté
- In office 1969–1973

State Deputy of São Paulo
- In office 1983–1991

Federal Deputy for São Paulo
- In office 1991–2007

Personal details
- Born: 26 March 1942 Neves Paulista, São Paulo, Brazil
- Died: 1 November 2019 (aged 77) São Paulo, São Paulo, Brazil
- Cause of death: cancer

Ary Kara (26 March 1942 – 1 November 2019) was a Brazilian politician and sports executive. He served as a federal deputy from 1999 to 2003 and 2005 to 2007, a state deputy in São Paulo, and a councilor in Taubaté. He also was chairman of Esporte Clube Taubaté from 2009 to 2012.

He was a graduate of the Universidade de Taubaté. On 1 November 2019, Kara died of cancer in São Paulo.
