= Campos Machado =

Brazilian politician (1939–2024)

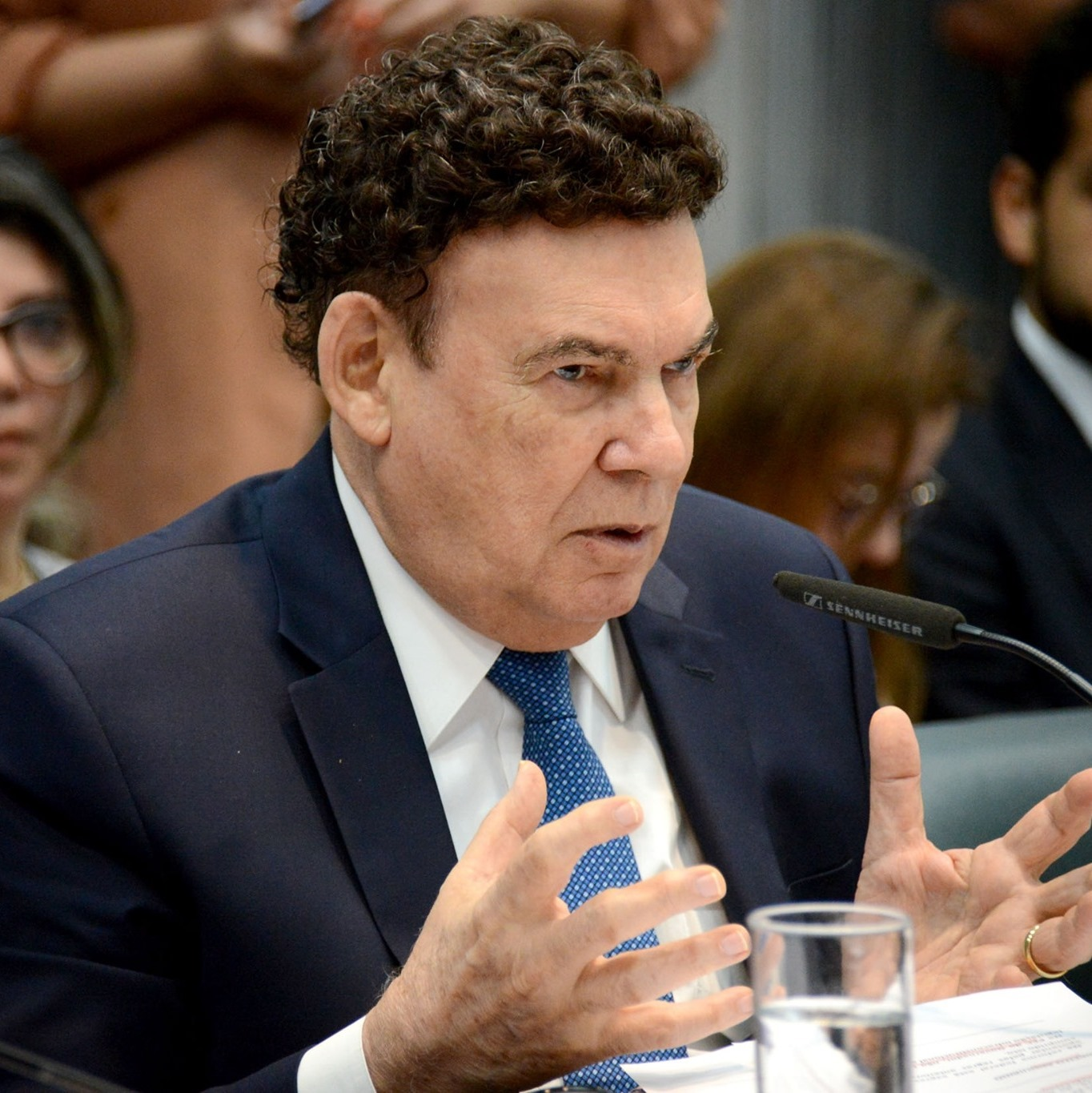
- Machado in 2022

Member of the Legislative Assembly of São Paulo
- In office 15 March 1987 – 15 March 2023

Personal details
- Born: Antônio Carlos Campos Machado; 31 October 1939; Cerqueira César, São Paulo, Brazil
- Died: 6 January 2024 (aged 84); São Paulo, Brazil
- Political party: PTB (1988–2020); Avante (2020–2023); PSD (2023–2024)
- Education: University of São Paulo
- Occupation: Lawyer, politician

Antônio Carlos Campos Machado (31 October 1939 – 6 January 2024) was a Brazilian lawyer and politician. A member of the Brazilian Labour Party, he was in the Legislative Assembly of São Paulo from 1987 to 2023.

Machado died in São Paulo on 6 January 2024 at the age of 84.
