= Ângela Guadagnin =

Brazilian politician and physician

Ângela Moraes Guadagnin
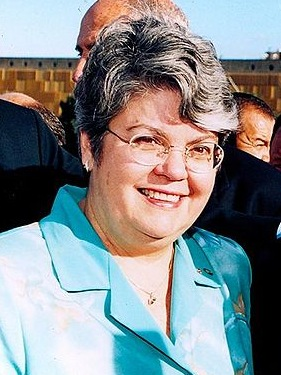

City Council of São José dos Campos
- In office 1 Jan 2009 – 1 Jan 2012

Federal deputy for São Paulo
- In office 1 Jan 1999 – 31 Jan 2007

Mayor of São José dos Campos
- In office 1 Jan 1993 – 31 Dec 1996
- Preceded by: Pedro Yves Simão
- Succeeded by: Emanuel Fernandes

Personal details
- Born: April 8, 1948 (age 78) Rio de Janeiro - Brazil
- Party: Workers' Party
- Occupation: physician Stateswoman

Ângela Moraes Guadagnin (born Ângela Moraes on April 8, 1948, in Rio de Janeiro) is a Brazilian politician and physician. She was the mayor of São José dos Campos from 1993 to 1996, a federal deputy for the State of São Paulo from 1999 to 2006 (two four-year terms), and is currently a city councilwoman in São José dos Campos.

She caught national attention in 2006, when she performed the so-called "pizza dance" in the Chamber of Deputies of Brazil, in response to her fellow deputy João Magno having his charges of corruption dropped.

== Early career ==
Guadagnin entered the course of medicine at the Universidade de Taubaté in 1968, graduating in 1974. In 1988, she mastered in public health in the University of São Paulo. In 2001, already a deputy, she obtained her master's degree in policies in the Federal University of Rio de Janeiro.

== Pizza dance ==
Ângela Guadagnin is a member of Workers' Party (PT). She caught the attention of the Brazilian press when she performed a dance inside the Chamber of Deputies, celebrating that her fellow deputy João Magno of PT was absolved of charges of corruption in the Mensalão Affair. Magno's case was decided in a voting process among peers. Before the counting of the votes was finished (when it was already certain that Magno would be acquitted), Guadagnin stood up and, already dancing, walked towards the stairway and continued performing her dance in full view of TV cameras.

The dance was named "pizza dance" because of the Brazilian expression "acabar em pizza" (lit. to end up in pizza, which means to end up in nothing, to end up with no significant consequences, with people going out to eat pizza instead of biting the bullet). This expression has been frequently used to describe the absence of results in the investigation of politicians suspected of corruption.

She apologized, some time later, saying: "I can only ask for forgiveness and understanding, because I am a human being and I express my feelings."

The statewide repercussion of the episode was so great that Ângela Guadagnin was resoundingly defeated in the 2006 elections for the national Chamber of Deputies. Two years later she was successful in winning a seat in the City Council of São José dos Campos for 2009–2012.
