= Maria Lúcia Prandi =

Brazilian academic and politician (1944–2015)

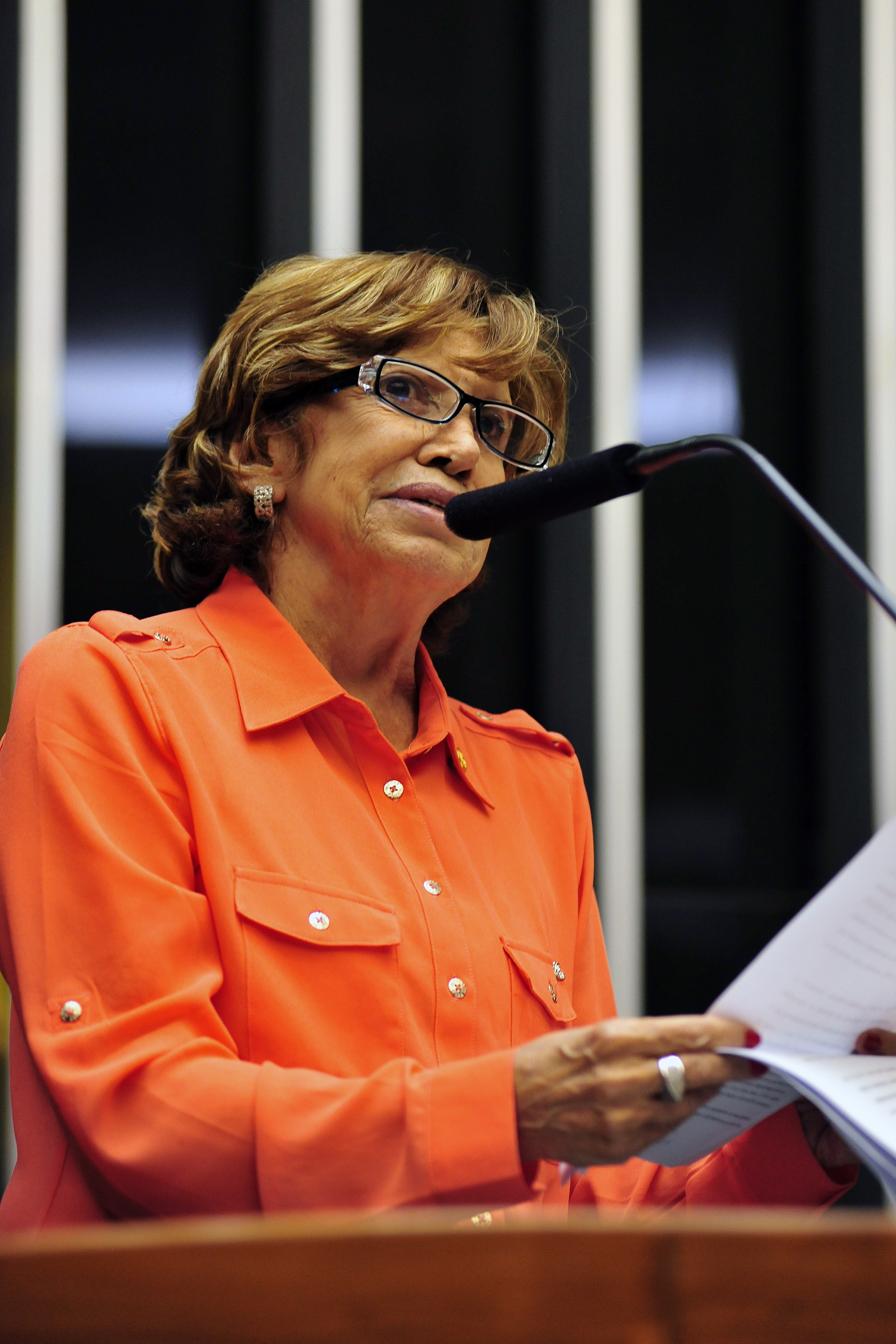
Prandi in 2014

Maria Lúcia Prandi (29 November 1944 – 7 October 2015) was a Brazilian academic and politician.

Prandi was born in Potirendaba, Brazil and earned a master's degree in social sciences, from the PUC-SP. She worked as a history professor and was also the adviser of the APEOESP (Association of Official Education Teachers of the State of São Paulo).

Prandi was elected councilor in 1992 by the Workers' Party. She was the first woman to chair the Municipality of Santos. Two years later she was elected state representative. She also served as Secretary of Education in the mayoralty of Telma de Souza. She was then re-elected the state representative in 1998, 2002 and 2006.

She led the fight for the installation of Export Processing Zone (EPZ) of the Port of Santos. Prandi also worked for the implementation of a technological park in the city, for the implementation of a light rail in the Baixada Santista, and combating violence against women. She also coordinated the Parliamentary Front for Healthy Aging.

In 2010, Prandi obtained 56,108 votes in the 2010 Brazilian general election for a spot of Congresswoman (equivalent to 0.26%). She was elected deputy and assumed the vacancy of Ricardo Berzoini, who in 2014 left the parliament to be a minister of Institutional Relations.

She died of cancer in São Paulo on 7 October 2015.
