= Mendes Thame =

Brazilian politician (1946–2022)

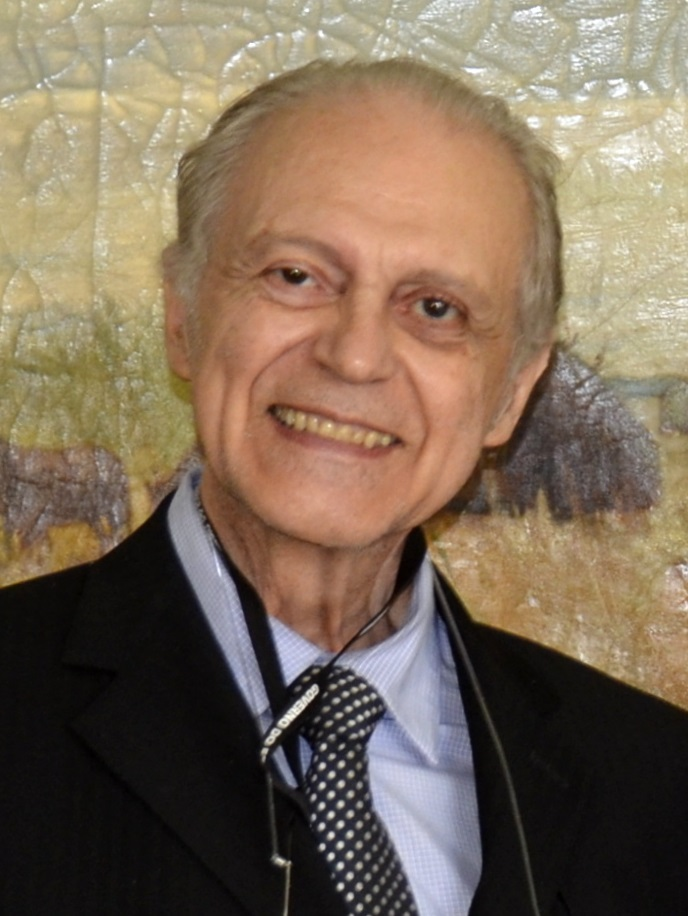

Federal Deputy from São Paulo
- In office 1 February 1999 – 1 February 2019

Mayor of Piracicaba
- In office 1 January 1993 – 1 January 1997

Federal Deputy from São Paulo
- In office 1 February 1987 – 1 January 1993

State Secretary of Water Resources, Sanitation and Works of São Paulo
- In office 28 July 1999 – 24 January 2022
- Governor: Mário Covas (1999–2001); Geraldo Alckmin (2001–2002)

Personal details
- Born: Antonio Carlos Mendes Thame; 13 June 1946 Piracicaba, São Paulo, Brazil
- Died: 28 April 2022 (aged 75)
- Party: Brazilian Social Democracy Party
- Education: University of São Paulo
- Occupation: Politician, lawyer

Antonio Carlos Mendes Thame (13 June 1946 – 28 April 2022) was a Brazilian politician who served as a Deputy.
