= Cabaceiras =

- Municipality
- Flag Coat of arms

- Location in Brazil
- Coordinates: 7.48889°S 36.2869°W
- Country: Brazil
- Region: South
- State: Paraíba
- Mesoregion: Boborema

Population (2020)
  - Total: 5,661
- Time zone: UTC−3 (BRT)

Cabaceiras (Central northeastern portuguese pronunciation: [kɐbɐˈseɾɐ]) is a municipality in the state of Paraíba in the Northeast Region of Brazil.

== See also ==
- List of municipalities in Paraíba
