= Carlos Neder =

Brazilian politician and physician (1953–2021)

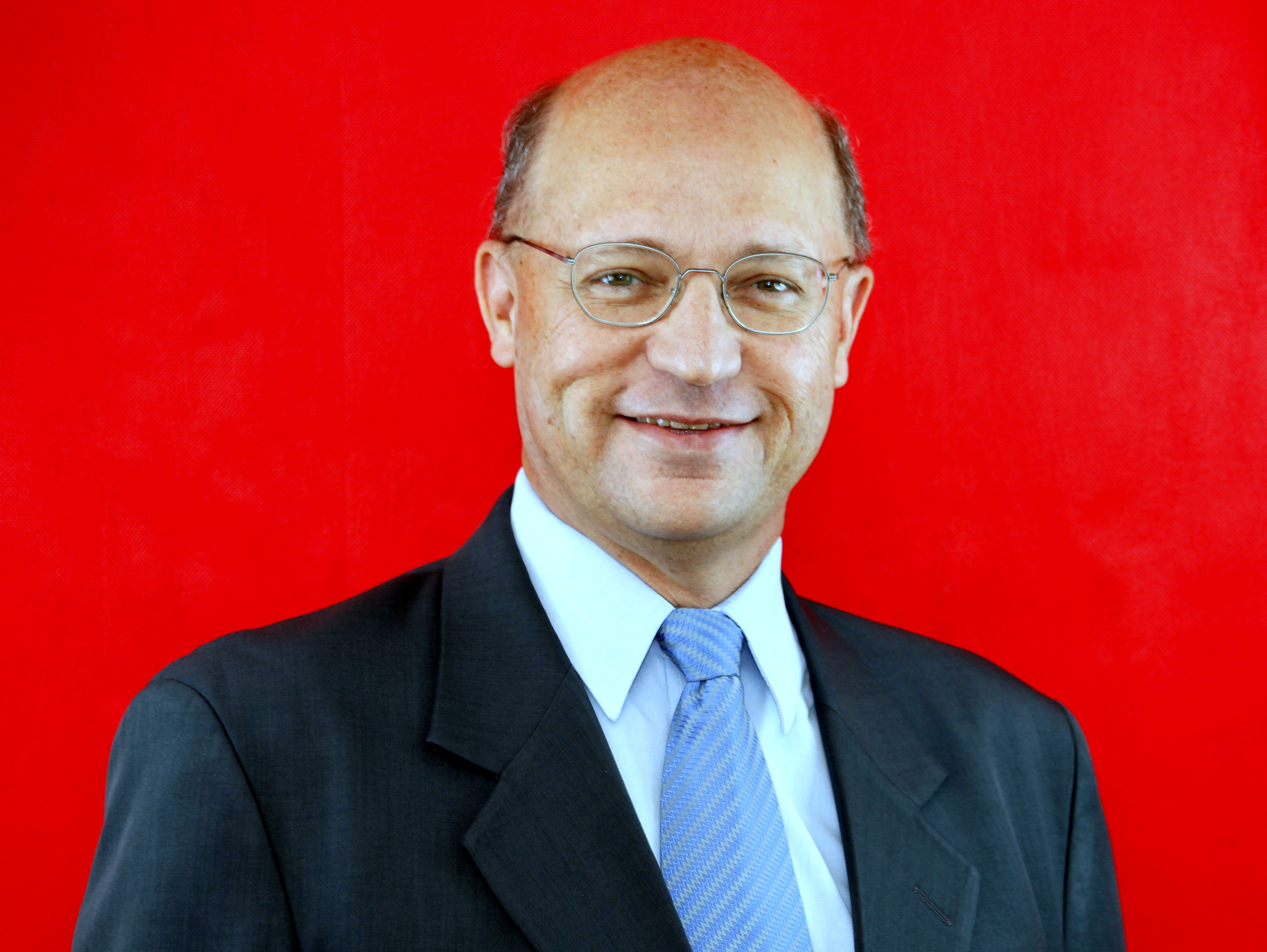
- Neder in 2012

State Deputy of São Paulo
- In office 3 January 2013 – 15 March 2019
- In office 28 July 2010 – 14 March 2011
- In office 7 January 2005 – 14 March 2007

Member of the Municipal Chamber of São Paulo
- In office 15 March 2011 – 31 December 2012
- In office April 2007 – 31 December 2008
- In office 1 January 1997 – 31 December 2004

Municipal Health Secretariat of São Paulo
- In office 1 January 1990 – 31 December 1992
- Preceded by: Eduardo Jorge
- Succeeded by: Raul Cutait

Personal details
- Born: Carlos Alberto Pletz Neder; 29 December 1953 Campo Grande, Brazil
- Died: 25 September 2021 (aged 67) São Paulo, Brazil
- Party: PT

Carlos Alberto Pletz Neder (29 December 1953 – 25 September 2021) was a Brazilian politician and physician.

== Biography ==
A member of the Workers' Party, he served in the Legislative Assembly of São Paulo from 2013 to 2019, 2010 to 2011, and 2005 to 2007. He was also a member of the Municipal Chamber of São Paulo from 2011 to 2012, 2007 to 2008, and 1997 to 2004.

Neder died from COVID-19 in São Paulo on 25 September 2021, during the COVID-19 pandemic in Brazil. He was 67 years old.
