= São Miguel do Anta =

Municipality of Minas Gerais, Brazil

Coordinates: 20°42′S 42°43′W

- Municipality
- Interactive map of São Miguel do Anta
- Country: Brazil
- State: Minas Gerais
- Region: Southeast
- Time zone: UTC−3 (BRT)

Location of São Miguel do Anta within Minas Gerais

São Miguel do Anta is a Brazilian municipality located in the state of Minas Gerais. The city belongs to the mesoregion of Zona da Mata and to the microregion of Viçosa. As of 2020, the estimated population was 6,944.

== See also ==
- List of municipalities in Minas Gerais
