= Workers' General Party =

Workers' General Party Partido Geral dos Trabalhadores
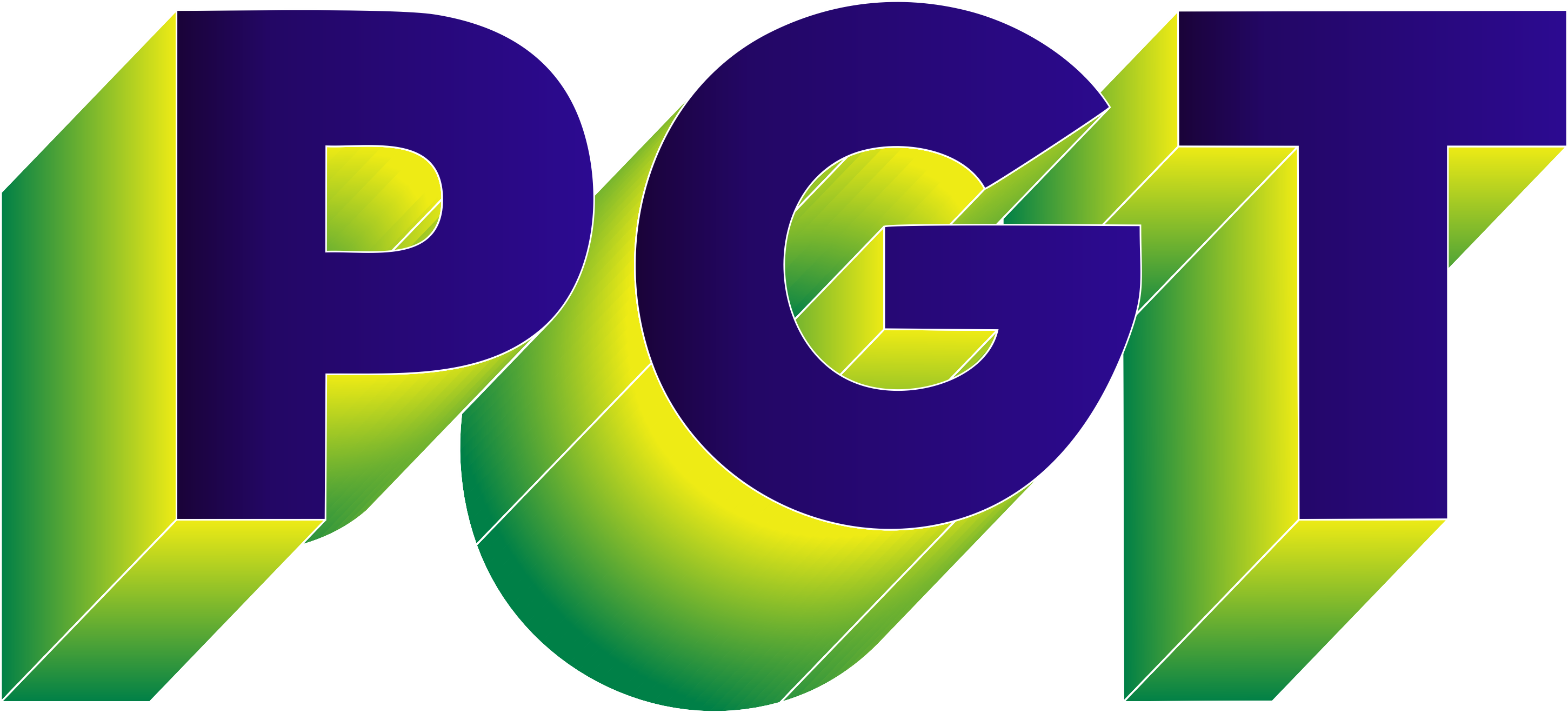
- Abbreviation: PGT
- President: Francisco Canindé Pegado
- Founded: May 1993
- Registered: December 29, 1995
- Dissolved: April 1, 2003
- Merged into: Liberal Party
- Ideology: Labourism
- Political position: Center-left
- Party number: 30

The Workers' General Party (Portuguese: Partido Geral dos Trabalhadores, PGT) was a minor political party in Brazil, established in 1993 and registered in 1995. It was presided by trade unionist Francisco Canindé Pegado, who had left the leadership of the General Confederation of Workers to found it.

The party's best results were achieved in the 2002 general elections, when it supported Anthony Garotinho's candidacy for president and had three of its candidates elected as state deputies.

In 2003, the party was incorporated by the Liberal Party, together with the Social Labour Party, in order to surpass an electoral threshold that would be introduced in 2007.

== Election results ==
=== Legislative elections ===
Election	Chamber of Deputies				Federal Senate			
Election	Votes	%	Seats	+/–	Votes	%	Seats	+/–
1998	27,825	0.04%	0 / 513	New	11,810	0.02%	0 / 81	New
2002	194,686	0.22%	0 / 513	0	103,973	0.07%	0 / 81	0
Source: Election Resources: Federal Elections in Brazil – Results Lookup

=== Presidential elections ===
Election	Candidate	Running mate	Coalition	First round		Second round		Result
Election	Candidate	Running mate	Coalition	Votes	%	Votes	%	Result
2002	Anthony Garotinho (PSB)	José Antonio Almeida (PSB)	PSB; PGT; PTC	15,180,097	17.87% (3rd)	—		Lost ✗
Source: Election Resources: Federal Elections in Brazil – Results Lookup
