= Luiz Eduardo Greenhalgh =

Brazilian politician (born 1948)

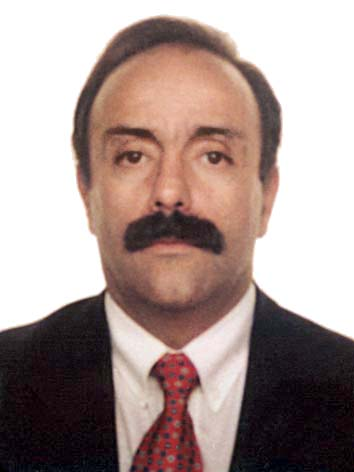
- Luiz Eduardo Greenhalgh

Federal Deputy from São Paulo
- In office January 2, 1997 – February 1, 2007

Vice Mayor of São Paulo
- In office January 1, 1989 – January 1, 1993
- Mayor: Luiza Erundina
- Preceded by: Artur Alves Pinto
- Succeeded by: Sólon Borges dos Reis

Personal details
- Born: Luiz Eduardo Rodrigues Greenhalgh; April 11, 1948 São Paulo, Brazil
- Party: PT (1980–present)
- Other political affiliations: MDB (1974–79)
- Occupation: Lawyer; Statesman

Luiz Eduardo Greenhalgh is a Brazilian politician and one of the founders of the Workers' Party (PT). He also was the attorney of the Landless Workers' Movement (MST). A founding member of PT, Greenhalgh was affiliated 1974–1980 to the Brazilian Democratic Movement (MDB), the party that previously represented the civilian opposition to the dictatorship. He was federal deputy for São Paulo and vice mayor of São Paulo in the government of Luiza Erundina (1989–1993). He participated in the creation of a special committee, the Brazilian Committee of Solidarity with the Peoples of Latin America in 1980.

== See also ==
- Central Única dos Trabalhadores
- Landless Workers' Movement

Political offices
Preceded by Artur Alves Pinto	Vice Mayor of São Paulo; 1989–93	Succeeded by Sólon Borges dos Reis
