= Party of the Nation's Retirees =

Party of the Nation's Retirees Partido dos Aposentados da Nação
- Abbreviation: PAN
- Founded: November 22, 1995
- Registered: February 19, 1998
- Dissolved: October 5, 2006
- Merged into: Brazilian Labour Party
- Headquarters: Belo Horizonte, MG
- Ideology: Retirees' interests Anti-corruption
- Slogan: "Today it's them, tomorrow it'll be us!"
- Party number: 26

Website
- www.pan.org.br

The Party of the Nation's Retirees (Portuguese: Partido dos Aposentados da Nação, PAN) was a minor political party in Brazil, founded on November 22, 1995, which aimed to increase the representation of retired people in politics, to defend their rights and to fight corruption.

The party's first participation in elections happened in 1996, under a provisory registry, when it nominated candidates for councillor in Salvador and other municipalities. In 2004, it had its first elected mayoral candidate in Igarapava, in the interior of São Paulo.

On October 5, 2006, after failing to achieve the minimum number of votes required to surpass an electoral threshold introduced that year, the party merged into the Brazilian Labour Party. However, due to the invalidation of this threshold by the Supreme Federal Court on December 7, an appeal by the party against the ratification of the merger was sent to the Superior Electoral Court, but was rejected.
