= Antonio Mentor =

Brazilian businessman and politician (1950–2024)

Member of the Legislative Assembly of São Paulo
- In office 15 March 1999 – 14 March 2015

Personal details
- Born: Antonio Mentor de Mello Sobrinho; 12 January 1950; São Paulo, Brazil
- Died: 7 May 2024 (aged 74); São Paulo, Brazil
- Political party: PT
- Occupation: Businessman

Antonio Mentor de Mello Sobrinho (12 January 1950 – 7 May 2024) was a Brazilian businessman and politician. A member of the Workers' Party, he served in the Legislative Assembly of São Paulo from 1999 to 2015.

Mentor died in São Paulo on 7 May 2024, at the age of 74.
