= São Manuel =

- Municipality
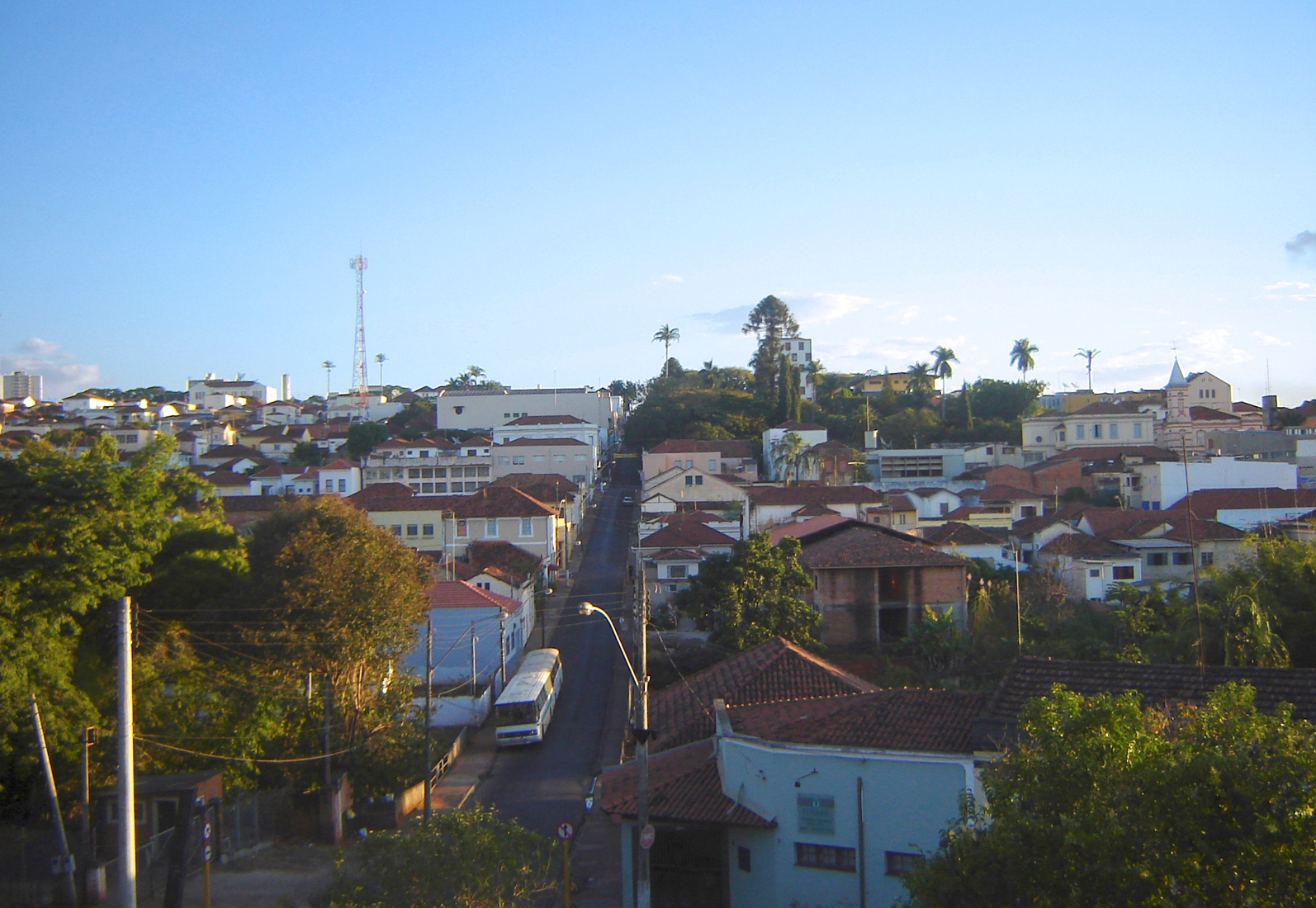

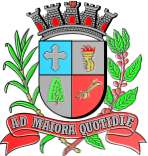
- Flag Coat of arms
- Motto: Ad Maiora Quotidie (Latin)
- Location in São Paulo state

- Location in Brazil
- Coordinates: 22°43′51″S 48°34′15″W
- Country: Brazil
- Region: Southeast
- State: São Paulo

Area
  - Total: 651 km^{2} (251 sq mi)

Population (2020)
  - Total: 41,123
  - Density: 63.2/km^{2} (164/sq mi)
- Time zone: UTC−3 (BRT)

São Manuel is a municipality in the state of São Paulo in Brazil. The population is 41,123 (2020 est.) in an area of 651 km^{2}. The elevation is 709 m.

== History ==
On April 19, 1850, lieutenant Manoel Gomes de Faria, Dona Delfina Carolina Gomes, Antonio Joaquim Mendes, and Sinhorinha Rosa da Conceição, sponsored the foundation of Sao Manuel at Água Clara. On February 2, 1871, the location of the city was changed to Bairro do Paraízo, or the Tavares. The Chapel of St. Benedict was built and blessed in 1874. The date of foundation for the city is recorded as June 17, 1870.

== Media ==
In telecommunications, the city was served by Companhia Telefônica Brasileira until 1973, when it began to be served by Telecomunicações de São Paulo. In July 1998, this company was acquired by Telefónica, which adopted the Vivo brand in 2012.

The company is currently an operator of cell phones, fixed lines, internet (fiber optics/4G) and television (satellite and cable).

== Transportation ==
The city is served by Nelson Garófalo Airport.

== People from São Manuel ==
- Alice Sommerlath (1906-1997), mother of Queen Silvia of Sweden.
- Emílio Surita (born in 1961), radio broadcaster.
- Karina Bacchi (born in 1976), actress.
- Milton Monti (born in 1961), politician.
- Teresa Surita (born in 1956), politician.

== See also ==
- List of municipalities in São Paulo
