= Getulina =

- Municipality
- Flag Coat of arms

- Location in São Paulo state

- Location in Brazil
- Coordinates: 21°47′55″S 49°55′43″W
- Country: Brazil
- Region: Southeast
- State: São Paulo

Area
  - Total: 678 km^{2} (262 sq mi)

Population (2020)
  - Total: 11,447
  - Density: 16.9/km^{2} (43.7/sq mi)
- Time zone: UTC−3 (BRT)

Getulina is a municipality in the state of São Paulo in Brazil. The population is 11,447 (2020 est.) in an area of 678 km^{2}. The elevation is 487 m.

== Media ==
In telecommunications, the city was served by Companhia de Telecomunicações do Estado de São Paulo until 1975, when it began to be served by Telecomunicações de São Paulo. In July 1998, this company was acquired by Telefónica, which adopted the Vivo brand in 2012.

The company is currently an operator of cell phones, fixed lines, internet (fiber optics/4G) and television (satellite and cable).

== See also ==
- List of municipalities in São Paulo
