= Ricardo Izar =

Brazilian politician (born 1968)

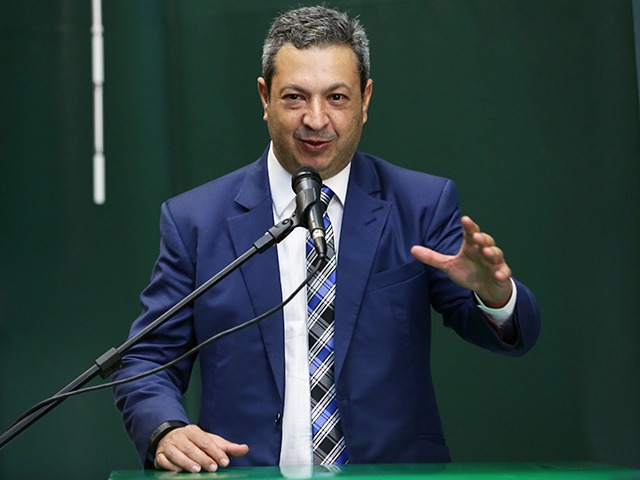
- Izar in 2019

Member of the Chamber of Deputies
- In office 1 February 2011 – 31 January 2023
- Constituency: São Paulo

Personal details
- Born: 1 August 1968 (age 58)
- Party: Republicans (since 2022)

Ricardo Izar Júnior (born 1 August 1968) is a Brazilian politician. From 2011 to 2023, he was a member of the Chamber of Deputies. From 2013 to 2015, he served as chairman of the Ethics Council.
