= Guairaçá =

Coordinates: 22.9339°S 52.6858°W

- Municipality
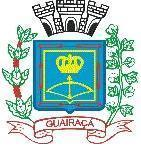
- Coat of arms
- Interactive map of Guairaçá
- Country: Brazil
- Region: Southern
- State: Paraná
- Mesoregion: Noroeste Paranaense

Population (2020)
  - Total: 6,609
- Time zone: UTC−3 (BRT)

Guairaçá is a municipality in the state of Paraná in the Southern Region of Brazil.

== See also ==
- List of municipalities in Paraná
