= Romeu Tuma =

Brazilian politician

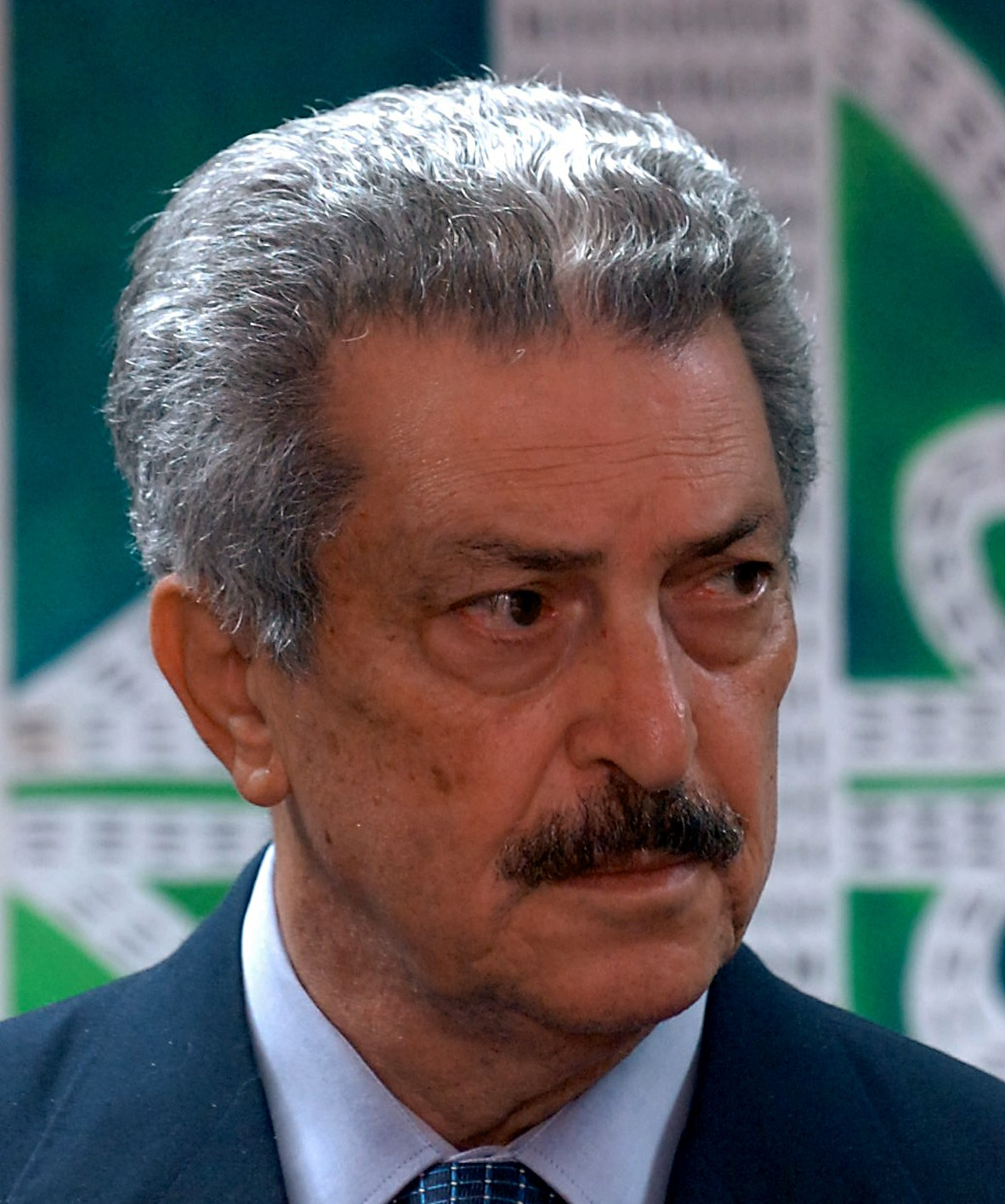

Senator for São Paulo
- In office February 1, 1995 – October 26, 2010

Director-General of the Federal Police of Brazil
- In office January 29, 1986 – April 29, 1992
- President: José Sarney; Fernando Collor
- Preceded by: Luiz de Alencar Araripe
- Succeeded by: Amaury Aparecido Galdino

Personal details
- Born: October 4, 1931; São Paulo, Brazil
- Died: October 26, 2010 (aged 79); São Paulo, Brazil
- Political party: PL (1984–95); PSL (1995–97); PFL (1997–2007); PTB (2007–10)
- Spouse: Zilda Dirane Tuma
- Occupation: Politician and former police officer

Romeu Tuma (October 4, 1931 – October 26, 2010) was a Brazilian politician and a former director of the Federal Police.

Tuma was born on October 4, 1931, in São Paulo, Brazil, to a family of Syrian descent. He died on October 26, 2010, of multiple organ dysfunction syndrome, in the Sirio-Libanês Hospital in São Paulo, where he had been since September, suffering from infectious aphonia.

Government offices
Preceded by Luiz de Alencar Araripe	Director-General of the Federal Police of Brazil; 1986–92	Succeeded by Amaury Aparecido Galdino
