= Telma de Souza =

Brazilian teacher and politician (1944–2026)

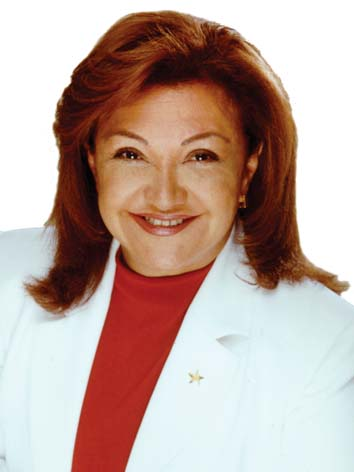

Councilor of Santos
- In office 1 January 1983 – 14 March 1987
- In office 1 January 2009 – 31 December 2010
- In office 1 January 2017 – 31 December 2024

Mayor of Santos
- In office 1 January 1989 – 31 December 1992
- Preceded by: Osvaldo Justo
- Succeeded by: David Capistrano Filho

State deputy of São Paulo
- In office 15 March 1987 – 31 December 1988
- In office 15 March 2011 – 31 December 2014

Federal deputy of São Paulo
- In office 1 February 1995 – 31 January 2007
- In office 4 January 2011 – 31 January 2011

Personal details
- Born: Telma Sandra Augusto de Souza; 29 September 1944 Santos, São Paulo, Brazil
- Died: 10 October 2026 (aged 82)
- Party: PT (1980–2026)
- Education: Catholic University of Santos; Pontifical Catholic University of São Paulo
- Occupation: Academic, teacher, politician

Telma Sandra Augusto de Souza (29 September 1944 – 10 October 2026), better known as Telma de Souza or just Telma, was a Brazilian teacher, academic, lawyer and politician with the Workers' Party (PT). She was a councilwoman and mayor of the city of Santos, a state and federal deputy for the state of São Paulo, and a city councilor for the city of Santos until her death. During her first term as mayor, she became part of the history of psychiatric reform in Brazil when she decreed an intervention at Casa de Saúde Anchieta on 3 May 1989.

== Life and career ==
=== Early years ===
Born in Santos, de Souza enrolled in the College of Philosophy, Sciences, and Arts at the Catholic University of Santos through an award given by Casa Ricordi and through the Conservatório Musical de Santos. After completing her studies and graduating in pedagogy in 1966, she began her career as a teacher in both the public and private systems. She took the vestibular at the Law School of the same institution, earning first place among 236 testers. She graduated with a law degree in 1971. At the same time, she did post-graduate studies in educational psychology at PUC-SP and specialization courses in London and Munich.

=== Political career ===
Alongside her teaching career, de Souza became involved with the teachers union movements in the state of São Paulo. In 1980, she was one of the founders of the Worker's Party, leading the branch established in Santos. In 1982, she became a candidate for the city council of Santos, where she gained 6,249 votes and was elected. She was the third most voted overall and the most voted for candidate from the PT.

After 15 years under federal intervention by the military dictatorship (due to the Law of National Security being invoked), Santos was able to hold elections for the mayoralty in 1984. The political forces of the city put forth various candidates, basing them on legislation on subtitled votes (where the parties were obligated to run various candidates and the winner was known by the adding together of the votes of the candidates of each party). De Souza was one of the candidates from the PT. Between 11 candidates distributed among 4 parties (PMDB, PDS, PDT, and the PT), de Souza obtained third place, being the most voted for subtitled candidate from the PT, with 34,252 votes. The winner of that election was former city councillor and vice-mayor Osvaldo Justo of the PMDB.

Despite the loss, de Souza consolidated power to become the principal leader of the PT in the Baixada Santista region. In 1985, she was a participant in the environmental movement that fought for the preservation of the Serra do Mar. Becoming part of the opposition, she was able to leverage the controversial and unpopular mandate of Justo and would go on to start her campaign to become a state deputy.

In the 1986 elections, de Souza was elected a state deputy, earning 28,615 votes (21,330 of those coming from Santos, where she was nicknamed the "Musa do Cais" due to the large number of votes she received from that region of the city). Although she was elected, she had a discreet mandate and did not hide her intention to run again for the mayoralty of Santos. On 12 August 1987, she appeared at the 36th Police Precinct in the city of São Paulo and filed a police report against Donato Guedes, a parliamentary advisor of deputy Afanásio Jazadji (PMDB), for assault.

In 1988, she once again launched a campaign to become mayor of Santos. Justo endorsed the campaign of federal deputy Del Bosco Amaral, who also had the support of governor Orestes Quércia, while the PDS put forth their own candidate, former mayor Paulo Gomes Barbosa. The first opinion polls indicated a dispute between Barbosa and de Souza, with Amaral in third place. On the eve of the election,Datafolha predicted a tight victory for de Souza with 32%, followed by Amaral with 29% and Barbosa with 25%. After the results came in, de Souza won against Amaral by a difference of 993 votes. The tight results drew protests from the PMDB, which demanded (to no success) a recount of the vote.

=== Mayor of Santos ===
De Souza assumed the mayoralty on 1 January 1989 and affirmed that the city of Santos had become a “failed” city, with just 29 million cruzados in its reserves (while beforehand the city's budget was 170 billion cruzados), and was seriously running the risk of not being able to pay public employees.

Until the end of Justo's term, the municipal-ran company Prodesan (Empresa de Progresso e Desenvolvimento de Santos S/A) had hired almost 2500 entrusted employees. After assuming the mayor's office, de Souza's administration initiated an administrative reform plan and a census on municipal employees. In February, 150 people were let go from Prodesan. In March, the mayoralty was able to approve a proposal from the municipal council preventing readjustments to employee salaries on the basis of the index of changes to the cost of living, as measured by Dieese.

One of the administration's first actions while in power was to maintain control over the population of stray cats in the city, despite protests by the population. In the previous administration, Justo had released dozens of cats to combat the spread of rats in the main walkway in the city. The new municipal secretary of health, David Capistrano Filho, alleged that the “overpopulation” of stray cats was the main cause for the hookworm outbreak on the city's beaches.

==== Public transport ====
One of the campaign promises made by de Souza's campaign was the freezing of bus fare rates. Three months after the decree was enacted, her administration promoted a readjustment of 40%. She alleged that the raise was motivated by the implementation of the Summer Plan by the Sarney administration.

In Santos, the local business community protested against the freeze and went on to delay paychecks due to a lack of resources. At the same time, the readjustment brought forth a bus strike in the city as part of the Greve Geral do Brasil general strike on 14 and 15 March 1989 against the Summer Plan. De Souza demanded that the local buses be running again, but this order was not obeyed. As a result, her administration expropriated the private business Viação Santos-São Vicente -and determined that its assets be transferred to the Companhia Santista de Transportes Coletivos (CSTC). Santos-São Vicente held a partial concession of their lines in Santos and later resorted to going to the courts. During the expropriation process, 20 of their buses disappeared in Santos-São Vicente's garage.

The expropriation was extinguished by the courts and 4 months later, Santos-São Vicente was able to turn over the decision. During the handing back of goods to the company, there was a confrontation between the company employees and the municipality that ended with the death of CSTC employee and PT member Anésio Pimenta dos Reis (known as Kojak). Kojak's death, which occurred during the campaign season for the 1989 presidential election, made Lula suspend his events and protest against the crime. The judicial fight and policies against the dealership resulted in public transport being rendered a municipal service.

==== Health ====
In 1989, de Souza's administration made Santos the first city in Brazil to implement a treatment center for people with AIDS named Craids (Centro de Referência em Aids).

=== José Bonifácio ===
While she was a federal deputy, de Souza was the author of the law that made José Bonifácio de Andrada e Silva, who was from the Baixada Santista region, a Herói da Pátria (Hero of the Fatherland) in 2005. As a state deputy, she was the author of Lei Estadual 11.049/2013, which instituted the “Programa Memória de José Bonifácio", which, among other things, would transfer the capital of the state of São Paulo from the city of São Paulo to Santos, his hometown, every 13 June, his birthday.

The proposal was released on the 250th birthday of the Patriarch of Independence, after the overturn of a veto by then governor Geraldo Alckmin of the idea. The law outlines the promotion of a civic ceremony together at the Patriarca monument, in the Historic Center of São Paulo, during the celebrations of the Semana da Pátria, during the whole month of September, along with the republication of works by Bonifácio by the Imprensa Oficial do Estado, the creation of a week of activities specific to the school year in the state educational system, among other items.

Upon her return to the Legislative Assembly of São Paulo (Alesp) in March 2011 (she was first elected in 1986), de Souza, through many proposals, brought many concerns of the Baixada Santista region to the chamber. There, she coordinated the Frentes Pró-Mobilidade Urbana da Baixada Santista and the defense of Santos as one of the host cities for the 2014 FIFA World Cup. She was also the 4th Secretary of the board of directors and presided over the chamber's Health Commission from March 2013 to March 2015.

=== Special Prosecutor's Office for Women ===
The Special Prosecutor's Office for Women in Alesp is an internal office and is part of the chamber's structure. De Souza incentivized, along with city councilors throughout the state, to create versions of the office in their municipal chambers. Versions of the office were already created in the cities of Itanhaém, Peruíbe, Praia Grande, Pindamonhangaba, Limeira, Araraquara, Guarulhos, Ibiúna, and Osasco. The offices were carried out as important works and put women's rights as more prominent point of discussion in various cities. The result of this was better coordination of the city chambers with the needs of the female population with regards to issues affecting them.

=== Dia Mães de Maio ===
As a state deputy, de Souza was the author of Law nº 14.981, which created "Dia Mães de Maio" in the official calendar for the state of São Paulo. To be remembered every 12 May, the date continues the memory of the victims of those killed in São Paulo in May 2006 after confrontations between police and drug gangs, especially in the Baixada Santista. Governmental and non-governmental organizations from various parts of Brazil calculated that 450 people were killed during this time, in what became known as the "Crimes de Maio".

=== Death ===
De Souza died from a stroke on 10 October 2026, at the age of 82.
