= Terra Rica =

Coordinates: 22°43′S 52°38′W

- Municipality
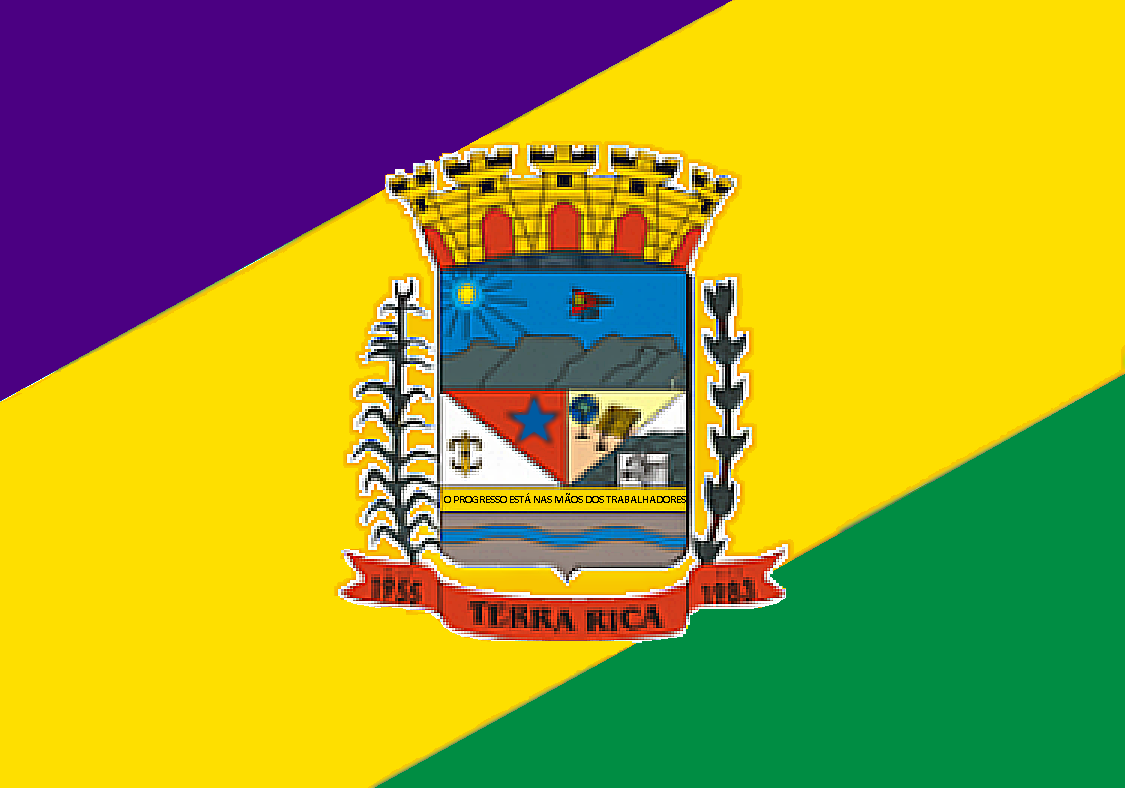
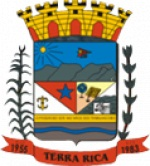
- Flag Coat of arms
- Interactive map of Terra Rica
- Country: Brazil
- Region: Southern
- State: Paraná
- Mesoregion: Noroeste Paranaense

Population (2020)
  - Total: 16,924
- Time zone: UTC−3 (BRT)

Terra Rica is a municipality in the state of Paraná in the Southern Region of Brazil.

== History ==
Terra Rica was elevated to the status of a municipality by the state law number 253, on November the 26th, 1954.

== See also ==
- List of municipalities in Paraná
