= Tapira, Paraná =

Tapira
- Municipality
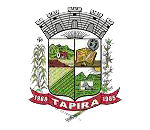
- Flag Coat of arms

- Location in Brazil
- Coordinates: 23°19′22″S 53°4′4″W
- Country: Brazil
- Region: Southern
- State: Paraná
- Mesoregion: Nortoeste Paranaense

Population (2010)
  - Total: 5,836
- Time zone: UTC−3 (BRT)

Tapira is a municipality in the state of Paraná in the Southern Region of Brazil.

== See also ==
- List of municipalities in Paraná
