= Universidade de Taubaté =

University in Brazil

Coordinates: 23.052°S 45.939°W

Taubaté University
- Universidade de Taubaté
- Motto: "A real university" (in Portuguese "Uma universidade de verdade")
- Type: Municipal university
- Established: August 20, 1956
- Affiliations: CRUB, RENEX
- Rector: Nara Lucia Perondi Fortes
- Undergraduates: 19,346 (2006)
- Location: Taubaté, Ubatuba, São Paulo, Brazil
- Campus: Urban
- Colors: Navy blue and White
- Mascot: Bandeirante
- Website: www.unitau.br
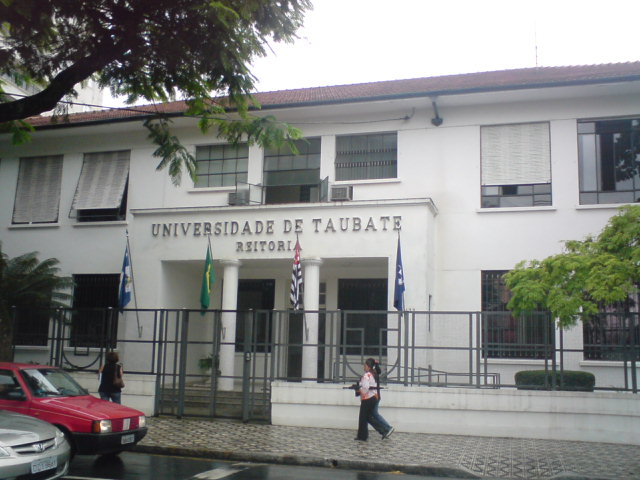

The University of Taubaté (in Portuguese; Universidade de Taubaté; UNITAU) is a municipal (partial city control) university located in the city of Taubaté, São Paulo state, Brazil. The institution is the largest and most traditional higher education college in the Paraíba Valley, State de São Paulo. It was established in 1973, gathering other pre-existing institutions and unifying them.

Nowadays, the university offers 42 undergraduate degrees, and 10 graduate programs, enrolling about 15,000 students.

== See also ==
- List of state universities in Brazil
