= Luiz Antônio Fleury Filho =

Brazilian politician (1949–2022)

Luís Antônio Fleury Filho
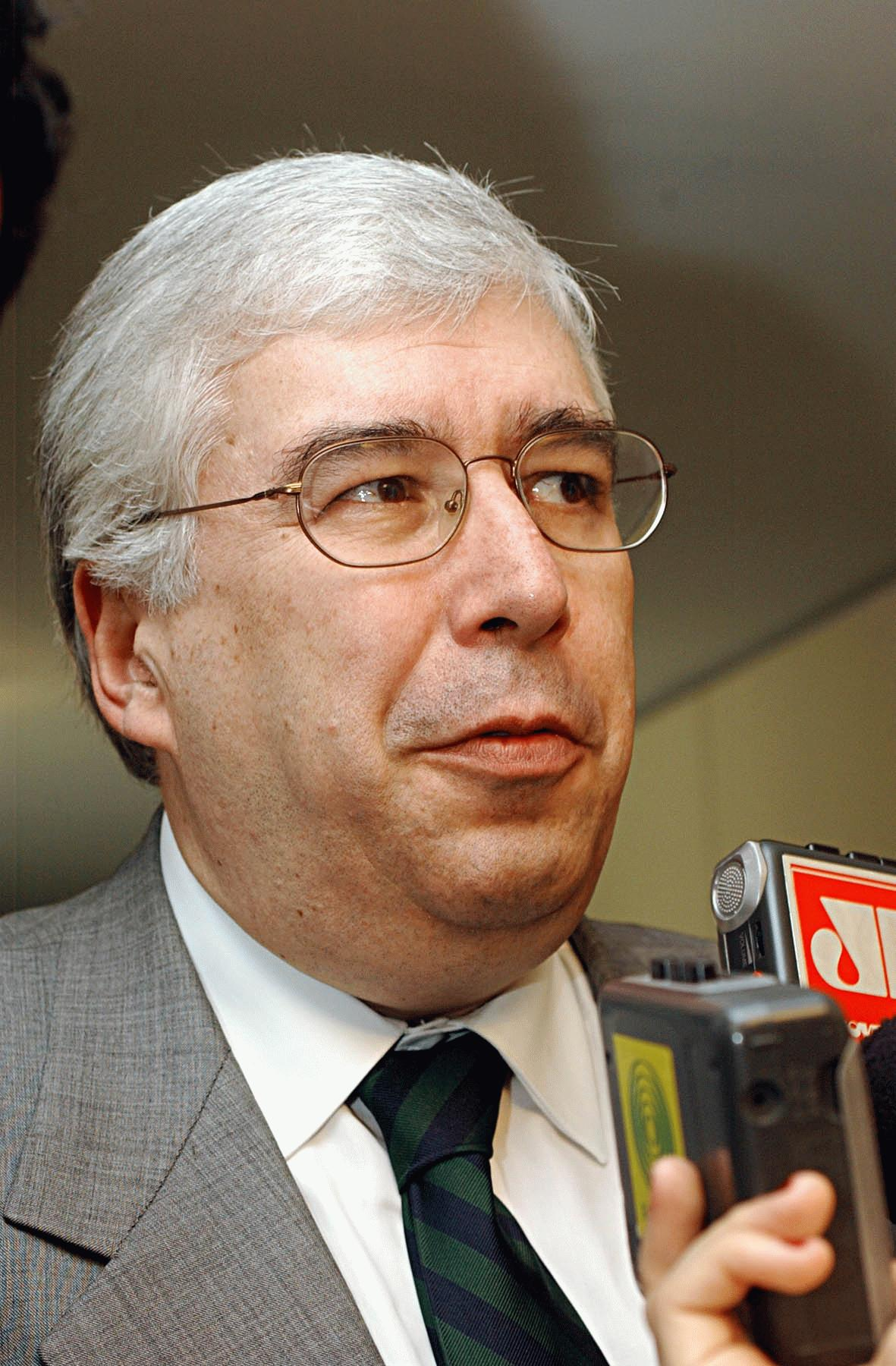

Member of the Chamber of Deputies
- In office 1 February 1999 – 1 February 2007
- Constituency: São Paulo

Governor of São Paulo
- In office 15 March 1991 – 1 January 1995
- Vice Governor: Aloysio Nunes
- Preceded by: Orestes Quércia
- Succeeded by: Mário Covas

Secretary of Public Security of São Paulo
- In office 16 March 1987 – 22 March 1990
- Governor: Orestes Quércia
- Preceded by: Eduardo Muylaert
- Succeeded by: Antônio Mariz de Oliveira

Personal details
- Born: 30 March 1949 São José do Rio Preto, São Paulo, Brazil
- Died: 15 November 2022 (aged 73) São Paulo, Brazil
- Party: PMDB (1987–1995); PTB (1995–2011); MDB (2011–2022)
- Education: Barro Branco Military Police Academy

Luiz Antônio Fleury Filho (30 March 1949 – 15 November 2022) was a Brazilian politician, prosecutor and professor. He was the governor of São Paulo from 15 March 1991 until 1 January 1995.

Fleury Filho died in São Paulo on 15 November 2022, at the age of 73.
