= 2010 Brazilian general election =

- Presidential election
- 3 October 2010 (first round); 31 October 2010 (second round)
- Opinion polls
- Turnout: 81.88% (first round, ▼1.37 pp); 78.50% (second round, ▼2.61 pp)

| Nominee | Dilma Rousseff | José Serra |
| Party | PT | PSDB |
| Alliance | For Brazil to Keep on Changing | Brazil Can Do More |
| Running mate | Michel Temer (PMDB) | Indio da Costa (DEM) |
| Popular vote | 55,752,483 | 43,711,388 |
| Percentage | 56.05% | 43.95% |
- Presidential election results
President before election
Luiz Inácio Lula da Silva
PT
Elected President
Dilma Rousseff
PT
- Legislative election
- 3 October 2010
- All 513 seats in the Chamber of Deputies; 54 of the 81 seats in the Senate
| Party | Leader | Vote % | Seats | +/– |
Chamber of Deputies
| PT | José Eduardo Dutra | 16.87 | 88 | +5 |
| PMDB | Iris de Araújo | 12.98 | 78 | −11 |
| PSDB | Sérgio Guerra | 11.88 | 54 | −11 |
| PR | Sérgio Tamer | 7.57 | 42 | +18 |
| DEM | | 7.56 | 43 | −22 |
| PSB | Eduardo Campos | 7.09 | 34 | +7 |
| PP | Francisco Dornelles | 6.55 | 41 | −1 |
| PDT | Vieira da Cunha | 5.03 | 28 | +4 |
| PTB | Cristiane Brasil | 4.18 | 21 | −1 |
| PV | José Luiz Penna | 3.84 | 15 | +2 |
| PSC | | 3.18 | 17 | +8 |
| PCdoB | Renato Rabelo | 2.85 | 15 | +2 |
| PPS | | 2.63 | 12 | −9 |
| PRB | | 1.69 | 7 | +6 |
| PSOL | Heloísa Helena | 1.18 | 3 | 0 |
| PMN | | 1.13 | 4 | +1 |
| PHS | | 0.79 | 2 | 0 |
| PTdoB | Luis Tibé | 0.67 | 3 | +2 |
| PTC | Daniel Tourinho | 0.62 | 1 | −3 |
| PSL | Luciano Bivar | 0.52 | 1 | +1 |
| PRTB | Levy Fidelix | 0.32 | 2 | +2 |
| PRP | | 0.32 | 2 | +2 |
Senate
| PT | José Eduardo Dutra | 23.12 | 15 | +5 |
| PSDB | Sérgio Guerra | 18.13 | 11 | −3 |
| PMDB | Iris de Araújo | 14.08 | 19 | +3 |
| PCdoB | | 7.37 | 2 | 0 |
| DEM | | 6.00 | 6 | −12 |
| PP | Francisco Dornelles | 5.38 | 5 | +4 |
| PTB | Roberto Jefferson | 4.69 | 6 | +2 |
| PPS | | 4.97 | 1 | 0 |
| PSB | Eduardo Campos | 3.60 | 3 | 0 |
| PR | Luciano Bivar | 2.73 | 4 | +1 |
| PRB | | 2.96 | 1 | −1 |
| PSOL | Heloísa Helena | 1.78 | 2 | +1 |
| PDT | Vieira da Cunha | 1.43 | 4 | −1 |
| PSC | | 0.73 | 1 | +1 |
| PMN | | 0.14 | 1 | +1 |
This lists parties that won seats. See the complete results below.

General elections were held in Brazil on 3 October 2010 to elect the president, National Congress and state governors. As no presidential candidate received more than 50% in the first round of voting, a second round was held on 31 October to choose a successor to Luiz Inácio Lula da Silva of the Workers' Party (PT), who was constitutionally ineligible to run for a third term as he had already served two terms after winning the elections in 2002 and being re-elected in 2006.

With the support of Lula, the ruling PT nominated Dilma Rousseff, a former member and co-founder of the Democratic Labour Party, who joined Lula's administration as Ministry of Mines and Energy and later served as presidential Chief of Staff. For her vice presidential running mate, Dilma chose Michel Temer, a member of the centre-right Brazilian Democratic Movement, who served as President of the Chamber of Deputies and previously considered a presidential run in his own right.

The centre-right Brazilian Social Democracy Party (PSDB) nominated José Serra, who resigned as Governor of São Paulo to mount his presidential campaign. A former Mayor of São Paulo who had served as Minister of Health during the Cardoso administration, Serra had previously been the presidential nominee of his party in 2002. For his vice presidential running mate, Serra chose Indio da Costa, a conservative Federal Deputy from Rio de Janeiro who was a member of the right-wing Democrats party. Costa, who became embroiled in controversy over his suggestion that the Workers' Party was linked to the international drug trade, received international comparisons to American politician Sarah Palin.

Marina Silva, a Senator from the Northern state of Acre and former Minister of the Environment under Lula, left the PT to mount a candidacy as part of the Green Party. Silva criticized the environmental policies of the Lula administration and ran a campaign in support of sustainable development, ending corruption, and decriminalizing marijuana. Silva, who would have been the first Black woman to serve as President, saw support from younger voters and managed to win almost 20% of the vote in the first round, well exceeding initial expectations.

In the first round, Dilma received 47% of the vote, Serra 33% and Silva 19%. Dilma went on to defeat Serra in the second round, becoming the first (and to date only) female President of Brazil. The elections were the first since 1989 (after the military dictatorship) that Lula did not run for the presidency.

In the parliamentary elections, a "red wave" saw the PT become the largest party in the Chamber of Deputies for the first time ever with 88 deputies, and elected Marco Maia as president of the lower house. Collectively, its coalition, For Brazil to keep on changing, elected 311 deputies. Four parties in the coalition lost seats; the Brazilian Democratic Movement Party (PMDB), Brazilian Republican Party (PRB), Democratic Labour Party (PDT), and the Christian Labour Party (PTC). However, only the PTC failed to gain seats in either house. The Republic Party (RP) had the biggest gain, electing 16 deputies more than in 2006. In the Senate, the centre-left coalition was able to elect 39 seats, against 10 won by the opposition. PT reached an all-time high in the upper house, electing 12 senators and becoming the second largest party in the Senate, behind only the PMDB. The other parties in the coalition did not have any significant gains, with the exception being the Communist Party of Brazil (PCdoB), which was able to elect the first female Communist Senator in Brazilian history, Vanessa Grazziotin, from Amazonas.

The anti-Lula bloc suffered substantial losses in both houses. The Democrats (DEM), which had been the second largest party in the Senate during the previous 2007–2011 legislature, was the fourth largest, and managed to elect only 2 seats, reducing their total to 6, tied with the Brazilian Labour Party (PTB) from the same coalition. It also had the largest loss in the Chamber, losing 22 seats, and was closely followed by its ally, the Brazilian Social Democratic Party (PSDB), which lost 13 seats. Overall, the Brazil Can Do More coalition lost control of 44 seats in the Chamber of Deputies and 11 in the Senate. Influential members of the opposition during the Lula administration, such as Arthur Virgílio, Heráclito Fortes, Marco Maciel, and Tasso Jereissati, were not able to obtain re-election and no longer served in the National Congress.

Other opposition members were more successful than the centre-right Brazil Can Do More coalition. The Socialism and Liberty Party (PSOL) was able to elect two senators, gaining an extra seat when compared to the previous legislature. It also kept its three seats in the Chamber. The Green Party (PV) gained two extra seats in the Chamber, in spite of losing its only seat in the Senate.

== Electoral system ==
The president was elected using the two-round system; if no candidate received a majority in the first round of voting, a second round would be held.

According to the Constitution, each state is represented by three senators elected by a majority of the votes. They are directly elected to an eight-year term, and there is no limit on the number of terms a senator may serve. Alternating, one third and then two thirds of the seats are up for election every four years. In 2006, one third of the seats were up for election and thus in 2010 two thirds of the seats were up for election, corresponding to two of the senators elected by each one of the 26 Brazilian states and the Federal District.

The members of the Chamber of Deputies are elected by a system of proportional representation for a four-year term.

== Presidential candidates ==
The candidates of the two major political groups of the country were Lula's former Chief of Staff, Dilma Rousseff, of the ruling centre-left democratic socialist/social democratic Workers' Party (PT), and São Paulo State former governor, José Serra, from the centre-right opposition coalition formed mainly by the Social Democratic Party (PSDB), and the right-wing Democrats (DEM).

Another main candidate was Marina Silva, Lula's former Minister of Environment. She is the candidate for the Green Party (PV), which she joined on late 2009 after leaving the PT, which she helped establishing in the 1980s. She has obtained international recognition as a defender of the Amazon rainforest, but is less known in her native Brazil, being unable to obtain more support than the other two major candidates in opinion polls.

=== Lula's potential successors ===
As Lula was ineligible to run for a third consecutive term due to term limits established by the Brazilian constitution, speculation mounted in the years prior to the election around who might take the mantle of the Workers' Party in his absence. Though Lula was widely popular, many commentators speculated that his likely successors in the PT would fail to generate his populist touch. Polling conducted in Lula's second term found that a slim majority favored amending the constitution to allow Lula to run for a third term, but he opposed such efforts. Two of Lula's key allies tipped as potential successors, former Minister of Finance Antonio Palocci and former presidential Chief of Staff José Dirceu, were harmed by their involvement in the 2005 Mensalão scandal.

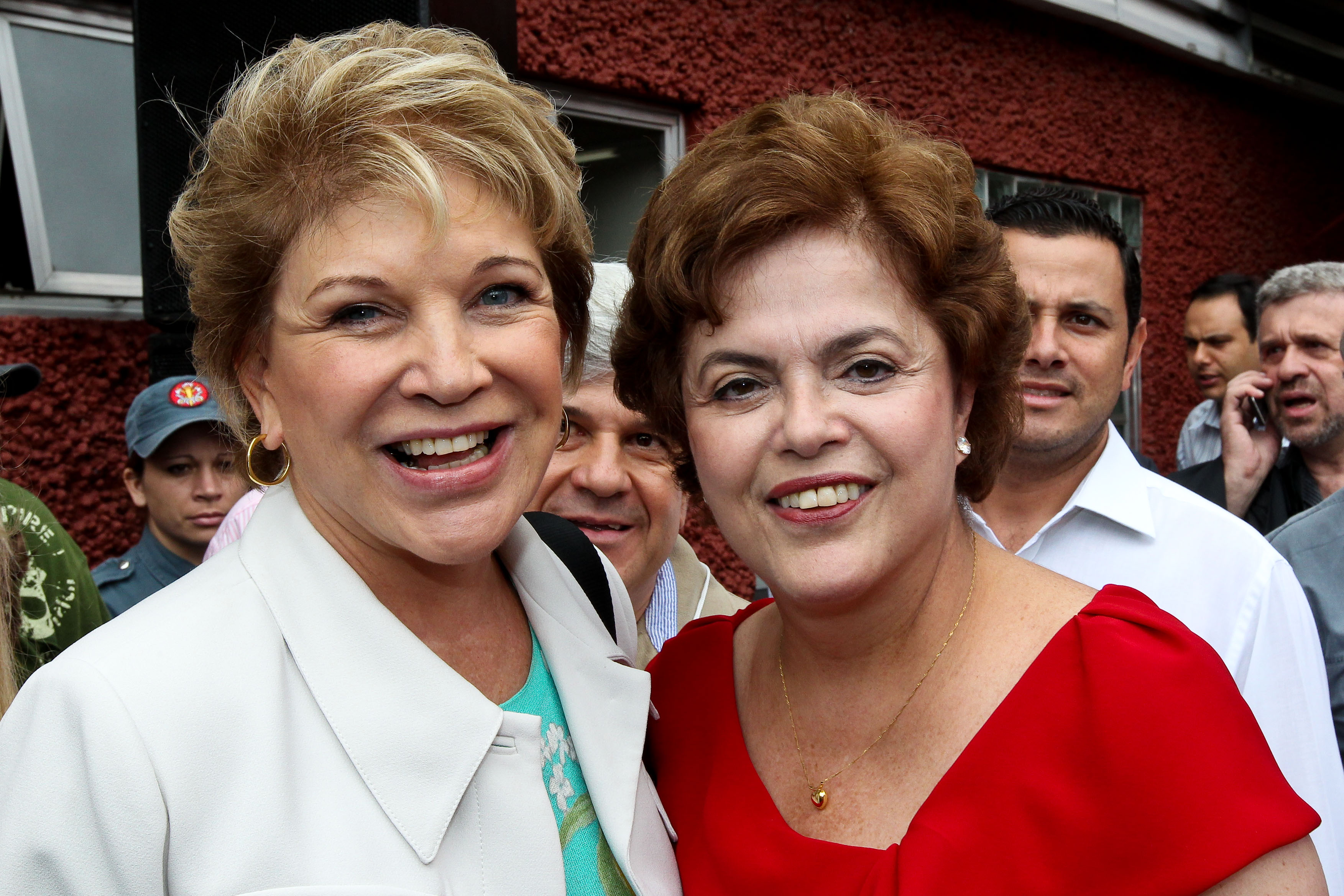
Dilma with Marta Suplicy, previously considered a likely candidate of the PT in 2010

In 2008, Lula announced that he wanted a woman to succeed him in the presidency. Former Mayor of São Paulo Marta Suplicy, who served at the helm of Brazil's largest city from 2001 to 2005, was considered to be, along with Dilma, the most likely candidate to lead the PT in the 2010 presidential election. Polling conducted in 2008 found her to be a more popular potential presidential candidate than Dilma. After losing her bid for reelection in 2004, Suplicy was appointed by Lula to the position of Minister of Tourism, which was speculated to be an attempt at elevating her profile for a 2010 presidential bid. In 2008, Suplicy mounted another bid was for Mayor of São Paulo, which was seen as a precursor to a potential presidential bid in 2010; Suplicy lost the election, damaging her political fortunes.

Ciro Gomes, former governor of Ceará and Minister for National Integration during Lula's first cabinet, was a possible candidate for the Brazilian Socialist Party (PSB). In the years prior to the election, there was some speculation that Lula would support Ciro, a formal rival of his, in the 2010 election if no potential PT candidates appeared viable. Following the selection of Dilma as the candidate of the PT, the ruling centre-left group was worried that Ciro's bid could take votes from Rousseff, and thus, on April 27, PSB declined to launch his candidacy in order to support her. Gomes, a populist who had appeared on third place in polls from May 2009 to April 2010, had been a presidential candidate in 1998 and 2002, when he had a poor result after making sexist remarks and struggling to control his temper.

In addition to Dilma, Suplicy, and Gomes, other PT members or allies were mentioned as being potentially tapped by Lula to run in his absence. Senator Aloizio Mercadante of São Paulo, a key power-player in the PT who helped found the party and served as Lula's vice presidential running-mate in the 1994 presidential election, was also mentioned as a possible successor.

=== PSDB nomination ===
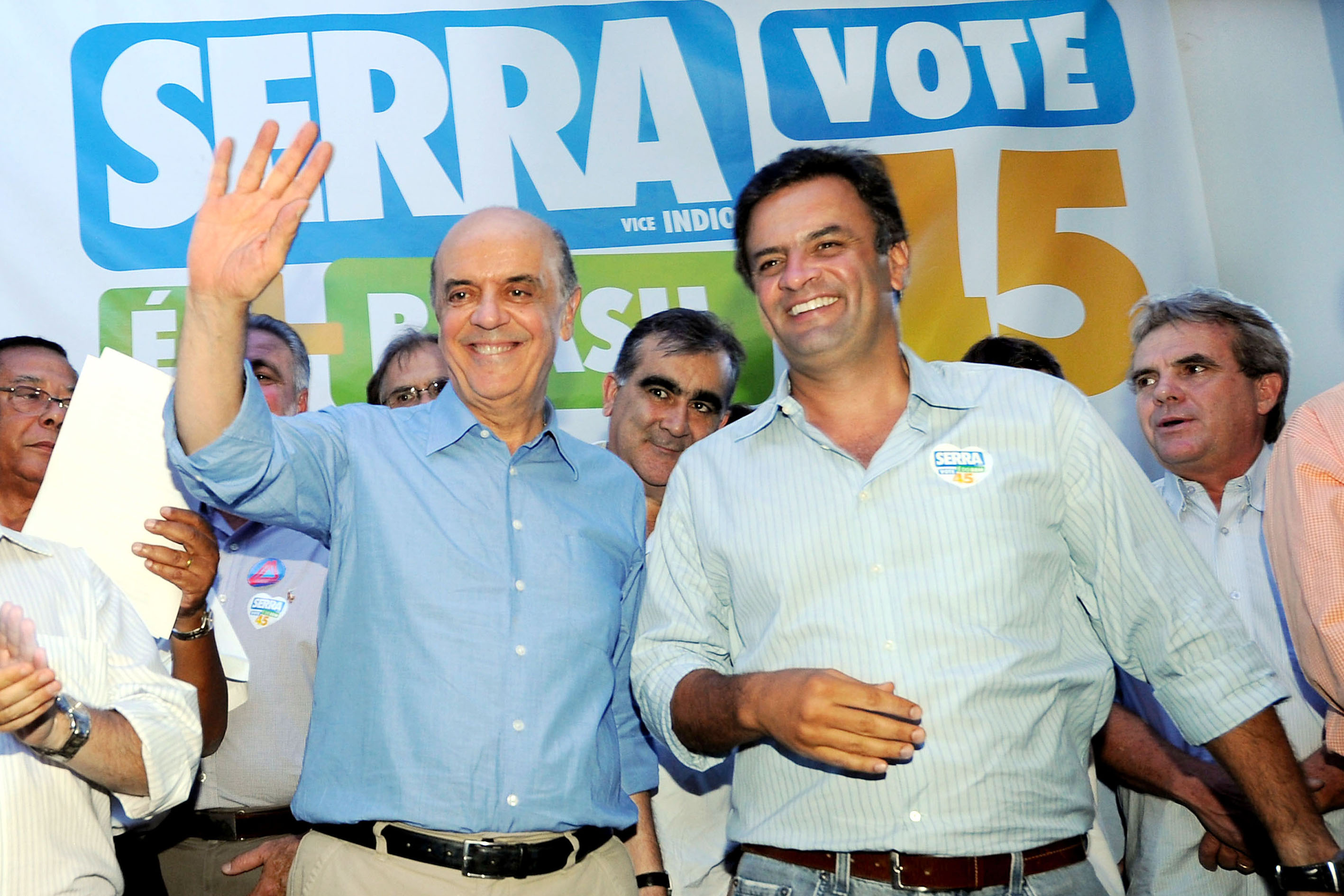
Serra and Aécio Neves, who was speculated as a potential candidate of the PSDB, in 2010

José Serra, the governor of São Paulo, resigned from the position to mount a bid for the presidency as a member of the dominant centre-right Brazilian Social Democratic Party (PSDB). Serra previously served as the party's candidate in the 2002 presidential election, where he lost to Lula. Aécio Neves, the popular Governor of Minas Gerais, was considered another potential candidate for the party, and later served as the party's nominee in the 2014 presidential election. During the campaign, Serra sought to challenge the perception of the PSDB as an elitist party. Serra's moderate positions on social issues such as abortion and religious issues, where he took a secularist approach compared to many conservative politicians, was noted.

=== Efforts by PSOL ===
Heloísa Helena, a prominent former senator from Alagoas, considered a presidential candidacy on the Socialism and Liberty Party (PSOL) ticket. Formerly a member of the dominant Workers' Party (PT), Helena was expelled from the PT in 2003 for criticizing the party's move to the centre under the Lula presidency. In the run-up to the election, Helena was considered a serious prospective candidate, being described as the only viable candidate who could potentially abandon the country's market-friendly economic policies. However, she declined to run for president in order to win back her Senate seat; she lost her race for Senate. On June 30, 2010, Plínio de Arruda Sampaio, a longtime politician who was formerly a senior PT official, was chosen to serve as PSOL's presidential nominee at the 2010 convention.

There were speculations that PSOL would form a broad coalition with Marina Silva. As the media printed such news, the United Socialist Workers' Party announced that if this coalition was formed, it would launch the candidacy of its president José Maria de Almeida. However, a resolution approved by members of PSOL determined that the coalition would be formed if PV gave up its alliances with the Lula administration, PSDB, DEM, and neoliberal stances. This resolution would make it very hard for the two parties to ally, since PV is led by José Sarney's son Sarney Filho and Silva herself has said that her candidacy could not be perceived as opposing Lula. Another faction of PV, led by Fernando Gabeira, is explicitly in favor of an alliance with PSDB, which left very few people in the party able to accept the proposal. As Rede Brasil Atual reported, "the coalition move[d] more by the desire of Green Party pre-candidate, Marina Silva, and Socialism and Liberty Party President, Heloísa Helena, than by aspirations of both parties".

=== Other candidacies ===
The election also featured five candidates from smaller parties, bringing the number of presidential candidates to a total of nine. They are Ivan Pinheiro from the Brazilian Communist Party (PCB), José Maria de Almeida from the United Socialist Workers' Party (PSTU), Rui Costa Pimenta from the Workers' Cause Party (PCO), José Maria Eymael from the Christian Social Democratic Party (PSDC), and Levy Fidélix from the Brazilian Labour Renewal Party (PRTB). According to the Superior Electoral Court's guidelines, they were not able to participate in televised debates, since their parties were not represented in the lower house of the National Congress.

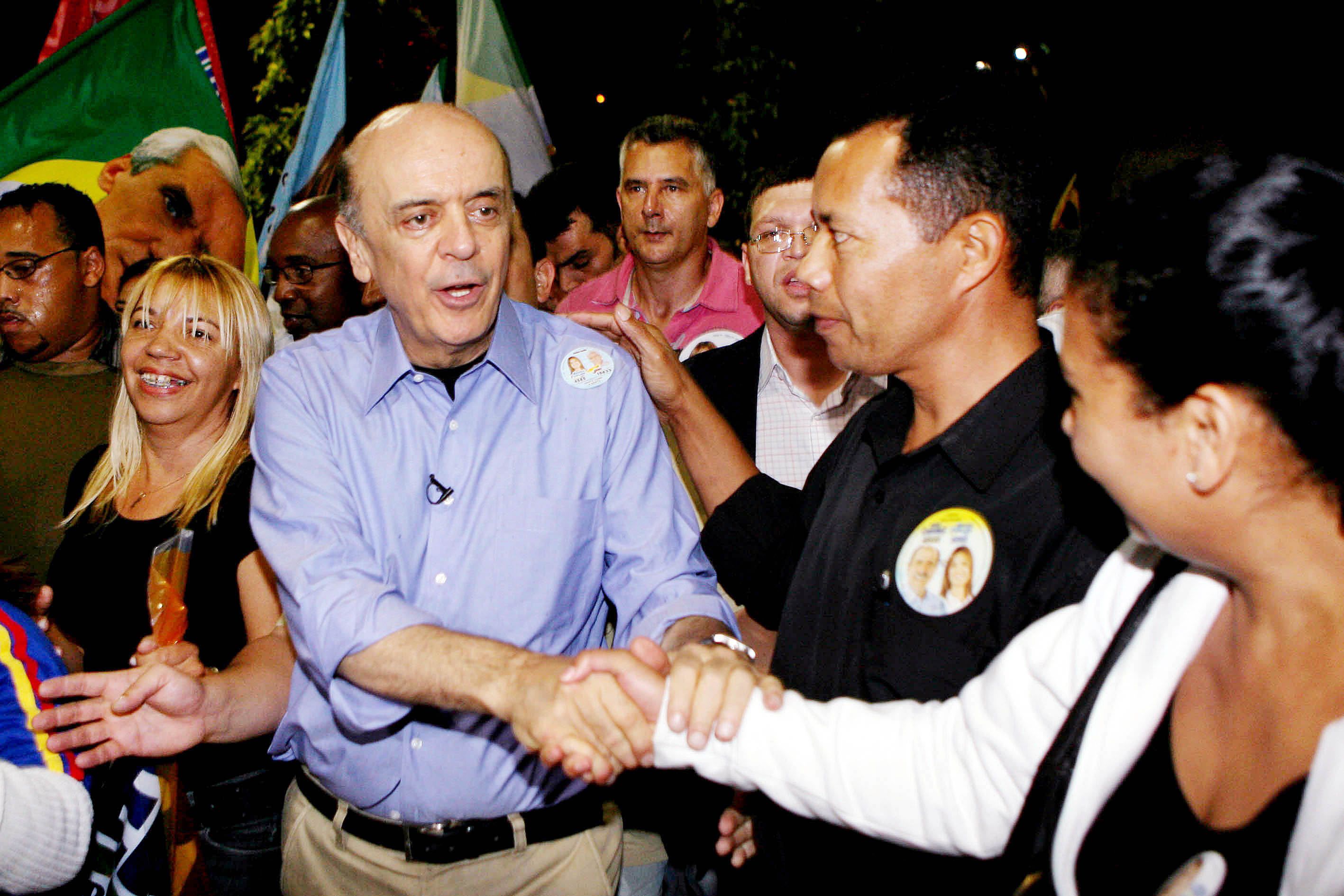
Former Governor José Serra (PSDB) on the campaign trail in 2010

=== Candidates in the runoff ===
| Party | Candidate | Most relevant political office or occupation | Party | Running mate | Coalition | Electoral number |
|---|---|---|---|---|---|---|
| Workers' Party (PT) | Dilma Rousseff | Chief of Staff of the Presidency (2005–2010) | Brazilian Democratic Movement Party (PMDB) | Michel Temer | For Brazil to Keep on Changing: Workers' Party (PT); Brazilian Democratic Movement Party (PMDB); Democratic Labour Party (PDT); Communist Party of Brazil (PCdoB); Brazilian Socialist Party (PSB); Liberal Party (PL); Brazilian Republican Party (PRB); Social Christian Party (PSC); Christian Labour Party (PTC); National Labour Party (PTN) | 13 |
| Brazilian Social Democracy Party (PSDB) | José Serra | Governor of São Paulo (2007–2010) | Democrats (DEM) | Indio da Costa | Brazil Can Do More: Brazilian Social Democracy Party; Democrats (DEM); Popular Socialist Party (PPS); Party of National Mobilization (PMN); Labour Party of Brazil (PTdoB); Brazilian Labour Party (PTB) | 45 |

=== Candidates failing to make the runoff ===
| Party | Candidate | Most relevant political office or occupation | Party | Running mate | Coalition | Electoral number |
|---|---|---|---|---|---|---|
| United Socialist Workers' Party (PSTU) | José Maria de Almeida | PSTU National President (since 1993) | United Socialist Workers' Party (PSTU) | Cláudia Durans | —N/a | 16 |
| Brazilian Communist Party (PCB) | Ivan Pinheiro | PCB General Secretary (2005–2016) | Brazilian Communist Party (PCB) | Edmilson Costa | —N/a | 21 |
| Christian Social Democratic Party (PSDC) | José Maria Eymael | PSDC National President (since 1997) | Christian Social Democratic Party (PSDC) | José Paulo Neto | —N/a | 27 |
| Brazilian Labour Renewal Party (PRTB) | Levy Fidelix | PRTB National President (1994–2021) | Brazilian Labour Renewal Party (PRTB) | Luiz Eduardo Duarte | —N/a | 28 |
| Workers' Cause Party (PCO) | Rui Costa Pimenta | PCO National President (since 1995) | Workers' Cause Party (PCO) | Edson Dorta | —N/a | 29 |
| Green Party (PV) | Marina Silva | Senator for Acre (1995–2011) | Green Party (PV) | Guilherme Leal | —N/a | 43 |
| Socialism and Liberty Party (PSOL) | Plínio de Arruda Sampaio | Member of the Chamber of Deputies from São Paulo (1987–1991) | Socialism and Liberty Party (PSOL) | Hamilton Assis | —N/a | 50 |

== Campaign ==
The official campaign began on July 6, 2010. The Superior Electoral Court accepted the candidacies of all nine applicant candidates. According to the Superior Electoral Court's guidelines, once the official campaign began the candidates are allowed to participate on marches, motorcades, and use sound trucks to ask for votes and distributing leaflets. They are forbidden to distribute shirts, hats, and gifts such as keyrings and pens. Rallies are allowed, but music concerts are prohibited. The candidates are not allowed to advertise on streetlights, bridges, clubs and other places of common use. Billboard ads are also prohibited, as well as attendance in inauguration of public premises.

=== Issues ===
Both candidates offered little threat to the economic stability of the country, but they differed significantly on issues such as fiscal discipline, foreign policy and state intervention. They were both likely to maintain a primary budget surplus to make public debt payments and reduce the ratio of debt to GDP. Some analysts believe Serra would have contained expenditure more effectively. Rousseff, in the other hand, favors a bigger role for state enterprises in the economy, which could reduce participation by private firms in sectors such as banking, oil and gas. Serra, who authorized the sale of Nossa Caixa bank in 2008, is seen as more open to privatization, as well as cuts in the public sector payroll. While past elections brought economic instability, in 2010 neither candidate was expected to stray far from current economic policies.

Rousseff was expected to continue Lula's foreign policy, boosting ties with developing nations, pushing for reform of multilateral bodies and lobbying for a permanent seat on the U.N. Security Council. Serra would likely have cooled ties with Lula's left-wing allies in Latin America, which could affect energy investments in both Bolivia and Venezuela. He could also take a harder line in trade disputes with Argentina and Mercosur. According to Mark Weisbrot, in an op-ed published by The Guardian Unlimited on January 29, 2010, if the centre-right candidate wins the race, it "would really be a huge win for the [U.S.] State Department." He argues that "while U.S. officials under both Bush and Obama have maintained a friendly posture toward Brazil, it is obvious that they deeply resent the changes in Brazilian foreign policy [...] and its independent stances with regard to the Middle East, Iran and elsewhere."

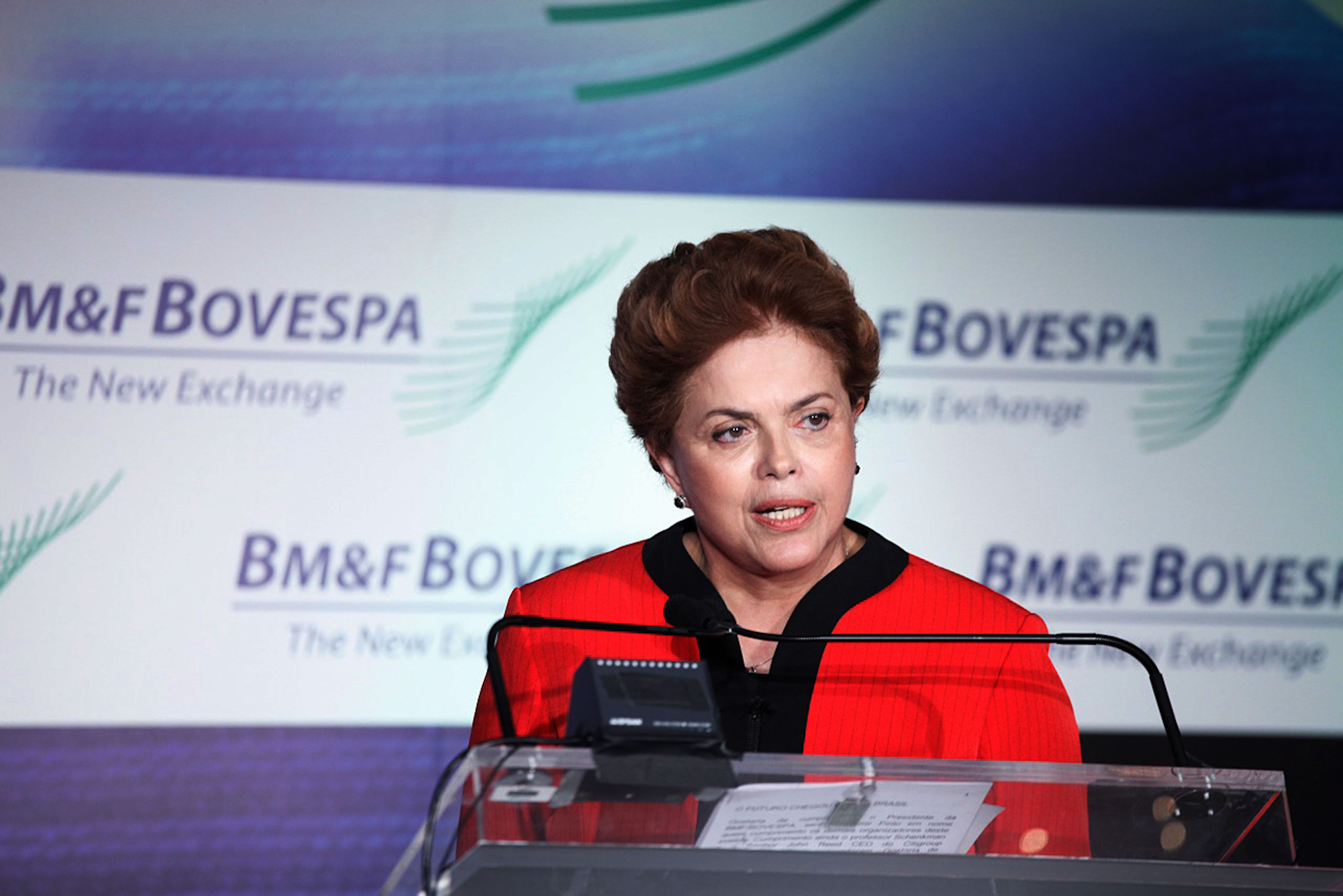
Former presidential Chief of Staff Dilma Rousseff at a lectern in 2010

==== Public health ====
One of the main public health issues debated in the election, raised by Rousseff's campaign, was addiction to crack cocaine. As a response to her campaign, Serra said he would establish clinics to treat addicts. He also said he would hand over 150 medical specialties clinics in two years. Rousseff said she would expand measures currently implemented by the Lula government. She also advocated for national production and distribution of medicines, through increased public investment. Silva advocated for focus on disease prevention.

==== Education ====
Serra pledged to invest in the infrastructure of primary public schools, while Rousseff said that eradicating illiteracy was her top priority. She also proposed the creation of a National Articulated System of Education to redesign the mechanisms employed in managing the sector. Silva said her focus was to invest intensively in all levels of formal education. She advocated the expansion of technologies access and the adoption of central lines to be addressed by educators.

==== Welfare ====
Serra compromised to retain Bolsa Família, claiming it would be expanded through aids to young people that take vocational education courses. Dilma said that she would expand the program, defending the "institutional strengthening" of the Ministry of Social Development and Action Against Hunger, which meant that the ministry would be responsible for integrating all social policies of the government. Silva defended a "third generation of social welfare", which would be achieved through partnerships with the private sector and the structuring of more educational projects.

==== Employment ====
Serra committed to expand technical schools in order to create more jobs. He said that improving the infrastructure of public services would be a tool for creating new jobs. Rousseff defended the maintenance of the economic policies of the Lula government, but also promised to hold a tax reform in order to alleviate the expenses of workers. Silva proposed the creation of green jobs through tax incentives for environmentally friendly businesses, in order to reduce the emission and consumption of carbon dioxide.

==== Public safety ====
Although it was not included on his government plan, Serra's main proposal for public safety was the creation of a Ministry of Public Safety. On the other hand, Rousseff promised to expand the current National Public Security and Citizenship Program to the whole country. She also proposed the creation of a Constitutional Fund for Public Security, which would give aids in the wages of police officers nationwide. Silva defended the creation of a "new institutional structure for public safety", which would combine the police work with investments in preventive policies.

=== Debates ===
For the 2010 presidential election, the Superior Electoral Court approved three televised debates, in addition to an unprecedented internet debate, which would be held by UOL and Folha de S.Paulo on August 18.

According to the Superior Electoral Court's guidelines, the candidates whose parties are not represented in the lower chamber of the National Congress were not able to participate in televised debates. Such candidates challenged this decision in order to be able to participate on the debates.

The first presidential debate took place on August 5, held by Rede Bandeirantes. The second debate was held on August 18, 2010 by internet portal UOL and newspaper Folha de S.Paulo. It was the first presidential debate broadcast exclusively through the internet in the history of the country.

=== Electoral programme ===
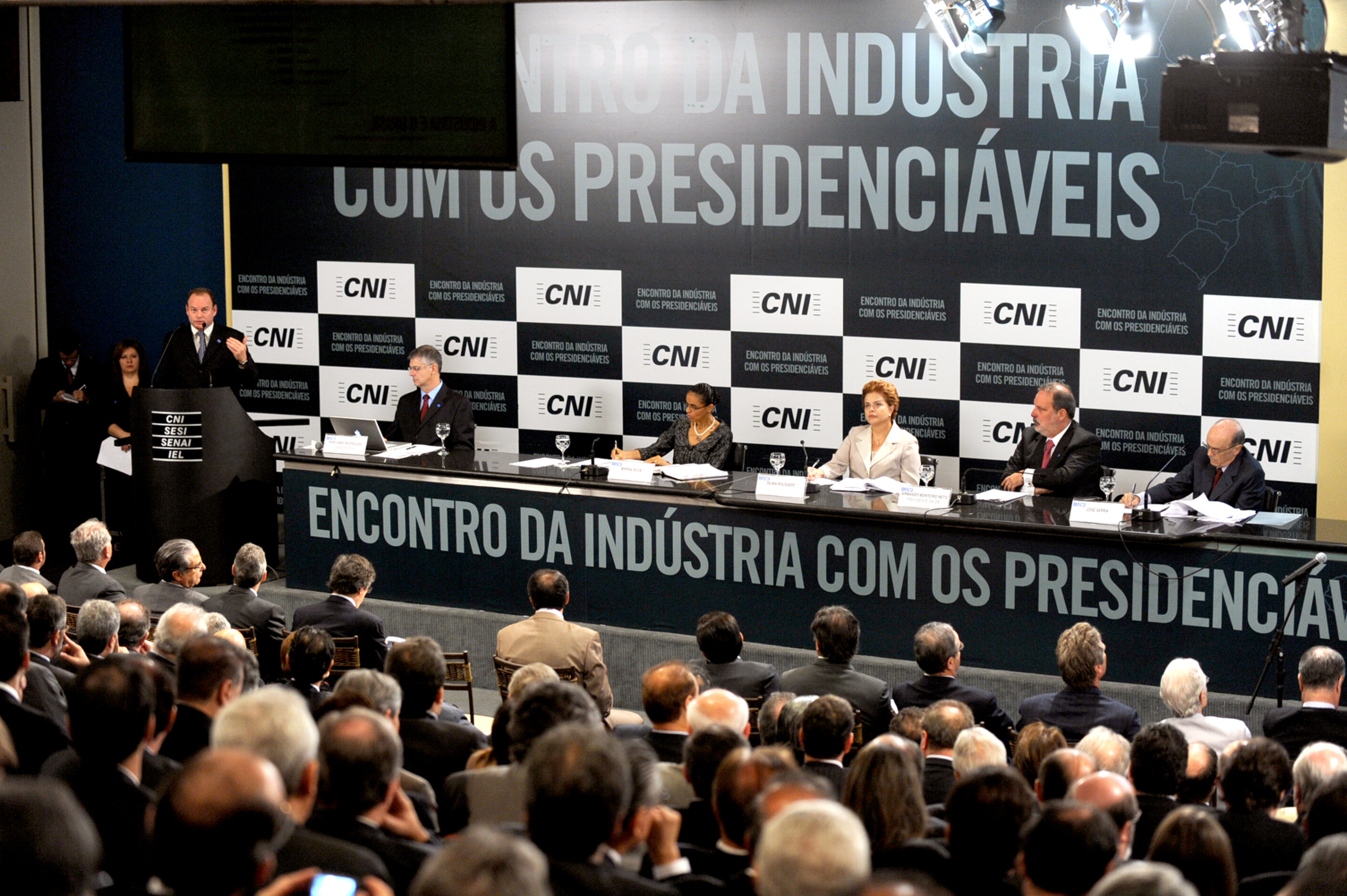
Presidential debate

According to the electoral law, all free-to-air television and radio networks must carry two 50-minute time slots a day from August 17 until September 30, 2010. The time allocated to each candidate is based on the number of seats held by the parties comprising their coalition in the Chamber of Deputies. The electoral programs are considered a key campaign tool in Brazil, where TV and radio are the main sources of information for most voters. The free air time on radio and TV also includes candidates contesting races for Governors, Legislative Assemblies, and both houses of the Congress. Parties are also allowed to run six 30-second advertisements per day.

Serra's electoral programs on TV were criticized for focusing too much on public health issues, with Financial Times correspondent Jonathan Wheatley saying that "[one] would think he was running for health minister". In the other hand, Rousseff's programs have been noted for their professionalism and production quality, while Marina Silva's programs were criticized for their lack of cohesion. Journalist Ricardo Noblat commented on his blog that her first TV program seemed more like "a BBC documentary on the environment" than an electoral program. Serra was also the target of criticism by Silva on the UOL/Folha debate for the use of a scenic favela in his program, while São Paulo still has many slums. After the airing of Serra's second program, singer Elba Ramalho, which had one of her songs featured in it, released a note stating that she did not recorded the jingle used by the candidate, and that is not her voice featured in the program. Although she publicly supported Serra in 2002, she stated she would maintain her neutrality in this election. In spite of this declaration, Ramalho decided to support Rousseff on the second round.

Serra's first television program was also the target of ridicule by Twitter users over the unintended double entendre of a phrase he said. In the video, which has been posted over 24 times on Google Video, he cites examples of people which benefited from his former public office experiences. However, in order to exemplify it, he used the preposition como, which can be used as both "as" and the first person inflection of the verb "to eat", that has a negative connotation for "to have sex with".

According to a poll conducted by Census Institute on August 20–22, 42.9% of voters claimed they are watching or listening to the electoral programs on either radio or TV. Dilma had the best electoral programs for 56% of them, while Serra's programs were preferred by 34%. Silva's programs were chosen as the best by only 7.5% of them.

Political programmes
| Television | 50 minutes at 1 p.m. and 8:30 p.m. daily |
| Radio | 50 minutes at 7 a.m. and 12 p.m. daily |

Schedule
| Mon, Wed, and Fri | Tues, Thurs, and Sat | Sun |
| Candidates for governor, State Assembly and Senate | Candidates for aresident and Chamber of Deputies | No slots but 30-second political ads run through day |

=== Second round alliances ===
On October 20, after PSOL instructed its members to vote for either PT's Dilma Rousseff or blank/null in the second round, Heloísa Helena decided to leave the presidency of the party. She felt that the party "lacked identity" with the support to Rousseff. The party's presidential candidate declared that he would vote null, while PSOL's congressmen declared their "critical vote" on Rousseff. Party members were oriented "not to give any votes to Serra".

PCB took a similar stance, saying they will "defeat Serra on the ballots and Dilma on the streets". PSTU, in the other hand, advocated the null voting on the second round. PV held a convention, where most of the 92 voting members decided that the party should stay neutral in the second round. Party members were free to support either of the two candidates, but they were forbidden to use flags or other party symbols. If they did so, they could have been punished with disaffiliation.

On October 14, the Progressive Party, a member of the Lulista coalition bloc in the National Congress which had remained neutral in the first round, decided to support Dilma. Most of its directories and candidates had already supported Rousseff on the first round. The Brazilian Labour Renewal Party also supported Rousseff in the second round. Levy Fidélix posted a photo on his Flickr account where he is accompanied by supporters holding flags of Rousseff's campaign.

== Opinion polls ==
From January 1, 2010 up to the day preceding the election, all polls had to be registered with the Superior Electoral Court.

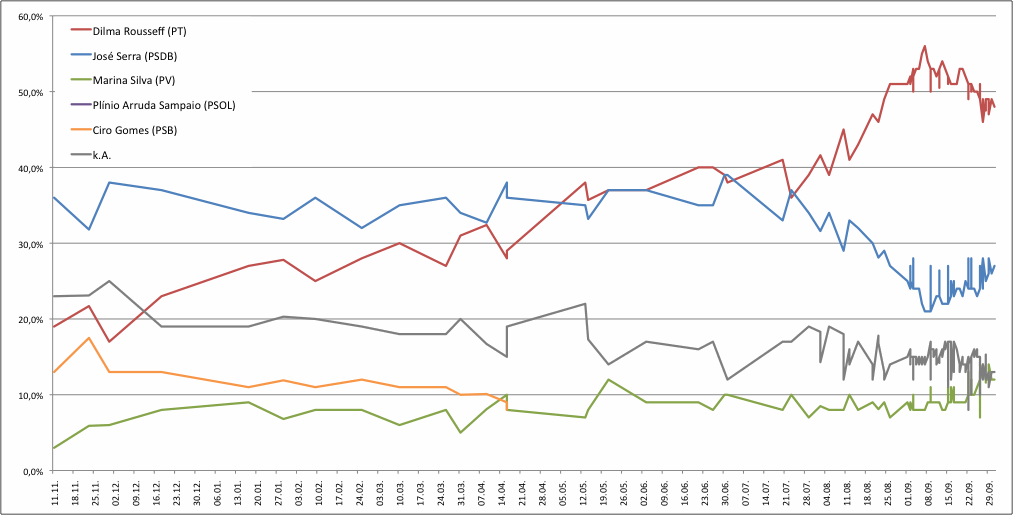
Opinion polling in 2010

According to polls, Rousseff was most likely to have won the race in the first round with over 50% of the valid voting intentions. She had a rapid increase in her popularity since mid-2009, and thus consolidated her lead against Serra, who had led the polls for over two years. She was given a further boost when incumbent President Lula campaigned on her behalf on her television programmes. Marina Silva was not able to reach more than 10% in the polls, but at the end of the campaign she experienced a rapid boost, and achieved 14% at the last poll. The other candidates had been unable to reach more than 2%. The number of undecided voters and those who declared an intention to vote blank or null was at about 12% according to the last poll.

== Results ==
=== President ===
| Candidate | Running mate | Party | First round | | Second round | |
| Candidate | Running mate | Party | Votes | % | Votes | % |
|---|---|---|---|---|---|---|
| Dilma Rousseff | Michel Temer (PMDB) | Workers' Party | 47,651,434 | 46.91 | 55,752,529 | 56.05 |
| José Serra | Indio da Costa (DEM) | Brazilian Social Democracy Party | 33,132,283 | 32.61 | 43,711,388 | 43.95 |
| Marina Silva | Guilherme Leal | Green Party | 19,636,359 | 19.33 | | |
| Plínio de Arruda Sampaio | Hamilton Assis | Socialism and Liberty Party | 886,816 | 0.87 | | |
| José Maria Eymael | José Paulo Neto | Christian Social Democratic Party | 89,350 | 0.09 | | |
| José Maria de Almeida | Cláudia Durans | United Socialist Workers' Party | 84,609 | 0.08 | | |
| Levy Fidelix | Luiz Eduardo Duarte | Brazilian Labour Renewal Party | 57,960 | 0.06 | | |
| Ivan Pinheiro | Edmilson Costa | Brazilian Communist Party | 39,136 | 0.04 | | |
| Rui Costa Pimenta | Edson Dorta | Workers' Cause Party | 12,206 | 0.01 | | |
| Total | | | 101,590,153 | 100.00 | 99,463,917 | 100.00 |
| Valid votes | | | 101,590,153 | 91.36 | 99,463,917 | 93.30 |
| Invalid votes | | | 6,124,254 | 5.51 | 4,689,428 | 4.40 |
| Blank votes | | | 3,479,340 | 3.13 | 2,452,597 | 2.30 |
| Total votes | | | 111,193,747 | 100.00 | 106,605,942 | 100.00 |
| Registered voters/turnout | | | 135,804,433 | 81.88 | 135,804,433 | 78.50 |
Source: Election Resources

=== Chamber of Deputies ===
| Party | Votes | % | Seats | +/– |
|---|---|---|---|---|
| Workers' Party | 16,289,199 | 16.87 | 88 | +5 |
| Brazilian Democratic Movement Party | 12,537,252 | 12.98 | 78 | –11 |
| Brazilian Social Democracy Party | 11,477,380 | 11.88 | 54 | –11 |
| Party of the Republic | 7,311,655 | 7.57 | 42 | +18 |
| Democrats | 7,301,171 | 7.56 | 43 | –22 |
| Brazilian Socialist Party | 6,851,053 | 7.09 | 34 | +7 |
| Progressive Party | 6,330,062 | 6.55 | 41 | –1 |
| Democratic Labour Party | 4,854,602 | 5.03 | 28 | +4 |
| Brazilian Labour Party | 4,038,239 | 4.18 | 21 | –1 |
| Green Party | 3,710,366 | 3.84 | 15 | +2 |
| Social Christian Party | 3,072,546 | 3.18 | 17 | +8 |
| Communist Party of Brazil | 2,748,290 | 2.85 | 15 | +2 |
| Popular Socialist Party | 2,536,809 | 2.63 | 12 | –9 |
| Brazilian Republican Party | 1,633,500 | 1.69 | 7 | +6 |
| Socialism and Liberty Party | 1,142,737 | 1.18 | 3 | 0 |
| Party of National Mobilization | 1,086,705 | 1.13 | 4 | +1 |
| Humanist Party of Solidarity | 764,412 | 0.79 | 2 | 0 |
| Labour Party of Brazil | 642,422 | 0.67 | 3 | +2 |
| Christian Labour Party | 595,431 | 0.62 | 1 | –3 |
| Social Liberal Party | 499,963 | 0.52 | 1 | +1 |
| Brazilian Labour Renewal Party | 307,925 | 0.32 | 2 | +2 |
| Progressive Republican Party | 307,188 | 0.32 | 2 | +2 |
| Christian Social Democratic Party | 191,835 | 0.20 | 0 | 0 |
| National Labour Party | 182,926 | 0.19 | 0 | 0 |
| United Socialist Workers' Party | 102,120 | 0.11 | 0 | 0 |
| Brazilian Communist Party | 57,563 | 0.06 | 0 | 0 |
| Workers' Cause Party | 6,660 | 0.01 | 0 | 0 |
| Total | 96,580,011 | 100.00 | 513 | 0 |
| Valid votes | 96,580,011 | 86.98 | | |
| Invalid votes | 6,951,838 | 6.26 | | |
| Blank votes | 7,506,834 | 6.76 | | |
| Total votes | 111,038,683 | 100.00 | | |
| Registered voters/turnout | 135,523,622 | 81.93 | | |
Source: Election Resources

=== Senate ===
| Party | Votes | % | Seats | | |
| Party | Votes | % | Won | Total | +/– |
|---|---|---|---|---|---|
| Workers' Party | 39,410,141 | 23.12 | 11 | 15 | +5 |
| Brazilian Social Democracy Party | 30,903,736 | 18.13 | 5 | 11 | –3 |
| Brazilian Democratic Movement Party | 23,998,949 | 14.08 | 16 | 19 | +3 |
| Communist Party of Brazil | 12,561,716 | 7.37 | 1 | 2 | 0 |
| Democrats | 10,225,883 | 6.00 | 2 | 6 | –12 |
| Progressive Party | 9,170,015 | 5.38 | 4 | 5 | +4 |
| Brazilian Labour Party | 7,999,589 | 4.69 | 1 | 6 | +2 |
| Popular Socialist Party | 6,766,517 | 3.97 | 1 | 1 | 0 |
| Brazilian Socialist Party | 6,129,463 | 3.60 | 3 | 3 | 0 |
| Green Party | 5,047,797 | 2.96 | 0 | 0 | 0 |
| Liberal Party | 4,649,024 | 2.73 | 3 | 4 | +1 |
| Brazilian Republican Party | 3,332,886 | 1.96 | 1 | 1 | –1 |
| Socialism and Liberty Party | 3,041,854 | 1.78 | 2 | 2 | +1 |
| Democratic Labour Party | 2,431,940 | 1.43 | 2 | 4 | –1 |
| Labour Party of Brazil | 1,480,846 | 0.87 | 0 | 0 | 0 |
| Social Christian Party | 1,247,157 | 0.73 | 1 | 1 | +1 |
| Social Liberal Party | 446,517 | 0.26 | 0 | 0 | 0 |
| United Socialist Workers' Party | 436,192 | 0.26 | 0 | 0 | 0 |
| Humanist Party of Solidarity | 305,793 | 0.18 | 0 | 0 | 0 |
| Christian Labour Party | 282,629 | 0.17 | 0 | 0 | 0 |
| Party of National Mobilization | 241,321 | 0.14 | 1 | 1 | +1 |
| Brazilian Communist Party | 146,627 | 0.09 | 0 | 0 | 0 |
| Brazilian Labour Renewal Party | 74,478 | 0.04 | 0 | 0 | –1 |
| Christian Social Democratic Party | 73,227 | 0.04 | 0 | 0 | 0 |
| Workers' Cause Party | 21,263 | 0.01 | 0 | 0 | 0 |
| National Labour Party | 6,013 | 0.00 | 0 | 0 | 0 |
| Total | 170,431,573 | 100.00 | 54 | 81 | 0 |
| Valid votes | 170,431,573 | 76.74 | | | |
| Invalid votes | 32,104,779 | 14.46 | | | |
| Blank votes | 19,541,016 | 8.80 | | | |
| Total votes | 222,077,368 | 100.00 | | | |
| Registered voters/turnout | 135,523,622 | 163.87 | | | |
Source: Election Results

== International reactions ==
- European Union: President of the European Commission José Manuel Barroso congratulated Rousseff for her victory in the presidential elections, and highlighted the historical significance of a woman to assume these functions for the first time in Brazil. "Allow me to highlight and congratulate you with the historical significance of the first election of a woman as President of the Federative Republic of Brazil," read the message sent by José Manuel Barroso to the new President of Brazil. The European leader recalled that "Brazil is a strategic partner of prime importance for the EU, sharing values and common strategic objectives" and advocated the continuation of Brazil's role in world affairs, a country "stronger, able to contribute to the resolution of global problems, to the stability and prosperity of Latin America and the intensification of bilateral relations with the European Union". According to Barroso, "The European Commission is confident that it will continue to work with Your Excellency and your Government in deepening the strategic partnership between the EU and Brazil, established in July 2007, and that it will further strengthen in the coming years".
- Argentina: The Foreign Ministry issued a statement wishing success to Rousseff. "This victory affirms the continuity of policies that have been developed, both in Mercosur and Unasur, for the well-being of our peoples and the entire Latin American community."The statement also stressed the importance of the Brazilian election in consolidating democracy on the continent.
- Bolivia: President Evo Morales issued a statement calling Rousseff's victory as a "triumph of democracy". According to Morales, Rousseff with the support for Lula, re-imposed democracy in a "united Latin America that invests in change."
- Bulgaria: President Georgi Parvanov called the elected president of Brazil, Dilma Rousseff, inviting her to visit Bulgaria, the country of origin of her father. Parvanov said in his congratulatory message, that the campaign and the elections in Brazil were accompanied with "a huge interest in Bulgaria". "The victory of Rousseff filled the Bulgarian people with pride" he said. She eventually visited Bulgaria in October 2011.
- Colombia: Vice President Angelino Garzon stated that Colombia will maintain "a level of understanding" with Brazil following the election of the country's new president. "With the new Brazilian government, Colombia will maintain the excellent relations we have been having with President [Luiz Inácio] Lula [da Silva]," Garzon said. He added that Colombia intends to strengthen its relationship with the neighboring country and maintain cooperation between them.
- Costa Rica: The Foreign Ministry expressed "their warm appreciation" to the government and people of Brazil for the second round of the presidential elections held the previous day which resulted in the election of Dilma Rousseff. "Costa Rica offers its warmest appreciation to the Brazilian people that once again demonstrated their proven talent for democratic freedom."
- El Salvador: An unnamed Salvadoran government agency issued a congratulatory message to Dilma Rousseff and published a photo of the president of El Salvador, Mauricio Funes, with a flag of the Worker's Party of Brazil. "Brazil is now the world leader of a new democratic order, popular, progressive and humanist." Funes is married to Brazilian Vanda Pignato. "On my behalf, and the first lady of the republic, my dear wife Wanda, and my son Gabriel, who is also a Brazilian citizen, as well as on behalf of the people and government of El Salvador, I extend our congratulations and shows affection of the elected president of Brazil", said Funes.
- France: President Nicolas Sarkozy expressed his "very warm congratulations" to Dilma Rousseff in a statement issued shortly after the announcement of official results. For Sarkozy, the election reflects the "recognition of the Brazilian people for the considerable work done by President Lula to make Brazil a modern and fairer country." "France and Brazil share the same values and a common vision of the world," said the French president. In addition, Sarkozy reiterated that the two countries "are convinced that it is urgent to combat climate change" and "believe in a renewed multilateralism to organize the multipolar world, taking into account the realities of the twenty-first century". He said Dilma Rousseff "can continue to count on the friendship and unfailing support of France."
- Guatemala: The president's office congratulated Dilma Rousseff for her victory in Brazil's presidential elections. "The government of President Alvaro Colom and the people of Guatemala congratulate the brotherly people of Brazil for the democratic party held this Sunday in their country."
- Guyana: President Bharrat Jagdeo sent a congratulatory message to Dilma Rousseff, expressing his "best wishes in preparing to assume the leadership of the country that has become one of the most progressive and influential of our hemisphere". He noted that both countries enjoy "excellent relations" and expressed confidence that Rousseff's policies for Brazil will allow the "continuation of political stability and a great economic and social progress".
- Iran: President Mahmoud Ahmadinejad sent a message of congratulations to Dilma, stating that he is "sure that in your term in office, Brazil will move faster in the path of progress and development...and Iran-Brazil ties have considerably expanded in the recent years and I am sure that this trend will continue in your term in office."
- Mexico: President Felipe Calderón contacted Rousseff by telephone and expressed his willingness to "continue the strengthening of bilateral relations", and conveyed his approval "for his exemplary civic and democratic exercise" of the election.
- Morocco: King Mohammed VI sent a congratulatory message to Rousseff. In this message, the Monarch expressed to Rousseff his best wishes for good health, happiness and success in her high office and in her endeavours to lead the Brazilian people towards further progress and prosperity. "The democratic choice expressed by the people of Brazil is a tribute to your lofty human qualities and vast political experience. It attests to the Brazilian people's trust in your ability to lead your country towards further social and economic accomplishments and enhance its standing at regional and international levels," the King said.
- Nicaragua: President Daniel Ortega sent an enthusiastic greeting to Dilma Rousseff, for her victory in the presidential elections, "What a joy and blessing the triumph of a woman as president of immense Brazil, that integrates cultures and proposals; Brazil that has grown amongst the world, with a worthy policy demanding recognition and participation of the [nations of the] South, against the rich arrogant powers of the North," reads the message.
- Paraguay: President Fernando Lugo spoke by telephone with the president-elect of Brazil, Dilma Rousseff, to congratulate her electoral victory, said the Paraguayan Minister of Justice and Labour, Humberto Blasco. Miguel Lopez Perito, Chief of Staff, said that Rousseff's election "represents a favorable position" to Paraguay.
- Peru: President Alan Garcia expressed his most sincere congratulations and best wishes on behalf of the people and Government of Peru. He expressed interest and commitment of his Government to further strengthen and deepen the strategic ties between Peru and Brazil, said the report issued by the Presidency.
- Portugal: President Aníbal Cavaco Silva signed an official statement that says he is confident that the mandate of Dilma Rousseff "[will] provide a renewed opportunity to deepen our relationship and our strategic cooperation. You can, Your Excellency, have my strong personal commitment accordingly." Silva invited the President-elect to visit Portugal soon. "I ask you to accept my hope for the personal happiness of Your Excellency and the continued prosperity and progress of the brotherly people of Brazil" concluded the president. Prime Minister Jose Socrates also congratulated the president-elect.
- Russia: President Dmitry Medvedev congratulated the new president of Brazil, Rousseff, for her "convincing" victory: "Accept my sincere congratulations on the occasion of her convincing victory in presidential elections," said Medvedev in a message addressed to Dilma Rousseff. The Russian president praised the "important achievements in the development of friendly relations and cooperation between Russia and Brazil" and was "ready" to continue with this association, according to the Kremlin statement. "I wish you success in this high office and wish happiness and prosperity to the Brazilian people" he added.
- Spain: Prime Minister José Luis Rodríguez Zapatero sent a telegram of congratulations to Dilma Rousseff that highlights that he will continue to work to maintain good relations between the two countries.
- United States: President Barack Obama spoke by telephone with the president-elect of Brazil, Dilma Rousseff, to congratulate her and wish good luck on her government. Obama invited Dilma Rousseff to visit the United States and expressed interest in continuing the strategic projects with the Brazilian government, like those established in the energy area. The State Department also separately congratulated Rousseff on her win. "The exemplary electoral process again illustrates Brazil's long-standing respect for democratic governance, civil rights and individual liberties, values that we share in common," State Department spokesman Philip Crowley said in a statement. "We look forward to working with president-elect Dilma Rousseff to deepen our partnership and advance common goals for the benefit of our two peoples and the Americas."
- Uruguay: President José Mujica spoke by telephone with President-elect Dilma Rousseff and expressed his satisfaction with her electoral success.
- Venezuela: President Hugo Chávez congratulated Dilma at the end of his TV show "Aló Presidente," saying: "Sister, friend, welcome to the club. I send you a kiss, a hug. Viva Lula!"

== Analysis ==
One of the important outcomes of the election was seen as the role of new media. Al Jazeera English also analysed the difference between the Brazil and Myanmar elections where the former was a "defeat for big media" and the latter saw a media clampdown in the run-up to the election.
