= Opinion polling for the 2010 Brazilian presidential election =

Dilma Rousseff PT	José Serra PSDB	Marina Silva PV

Opinion polling for the 2010 Brazilian presidential election started as early as 2008. All polls conducted between 1 January 2010 and election day were registered in the Superior Electoral Court database, as required by electoral law. The main nationwide polling institutes are Datafolha, IBOPE, Vox Populi, and Sensus.

== Election information ==
The first round of the 2010 Brazilian presidential election was held on October 3, as part of the country's general election, with a second round between the two leading candidates on October 31. That happened because under Brazilian law, if none of the candidates receives more than a half of the valid votes, a run-off is held four weeks after the first round. The leading candidate, Dilma Rousseff, received 46.9% of the first-round vote, thereby making a second round necessary.

In the election, Brazilian citizens eligible to vote chose their successor to then-President Luiz Inácio Lula da Silva, of the democratic socialist/social democratic Workers' Party. According to the Constitution, the president is elected directly to a four-year term, with a limit of two terms. Lula was hence ineligible for a third term, since he was elected in 2002 and re-elected in 2006. The 2010 election marked the first time since the end of the military dictatorship that Lula was not a candidate for the presidency.

=== Candidates overview ===
Since the earliest polls for president, former São Paulo Governor José Serra – candidate for the center-right opposition group led by the centrist/Third Way Social Democratic Party – was ahead of Dilma Rousseff, pre-candidate for the ruling center-left bloc led by the Workers' Party. Rousseff, however, increased her popularity greatly, rising from 3% in March 2008 to 30% in March 2010. On the May 8, 2010 poll by Vox Populi, she finally surpassed Serra, achieving 37% of the voting intention.

Another potential candidate for the ruling center-left group was Ciro Gomes from the Brazilian Socialist Party, who lost his comfortable second place in polls to Rousseff in May 2009. After that, he maintained an average of 12% of voting intention. On April 27, 2010, Gomes' party declined to launch his candidacy, instead supporting Rousseff. In the left-wing opposition group, Socialism and Freedom Party's Heloísa Helena was the most likely candidate, but her name was withdrawn from polling after she decided to run for a seat in the Senate for Alagoas. Plínio de Arruda Sampaio was her party's candidate for president. Almost simultaneously, Marina Silva left the Workers' Party and joined the Green Party to run for president. Prior to her candidature, she was well known internationally as a defender of the Amazon rainforest, but was less known in her native Brazil.

== Polls ==
The results displayed in this article excludes results for spontaneous polls (in which cards with the names of likely candidates are not presented to researched voters), due to the significant number of voters that would vote for Luiz Inácio Lula da Silva. By law, leaders of all stances of the Executive branch can only be re-elected once.

In September, Vox Populi institute began an unprecedented tracking poll for president, which was intended to last for 36 days until October 2.

=== First round ===
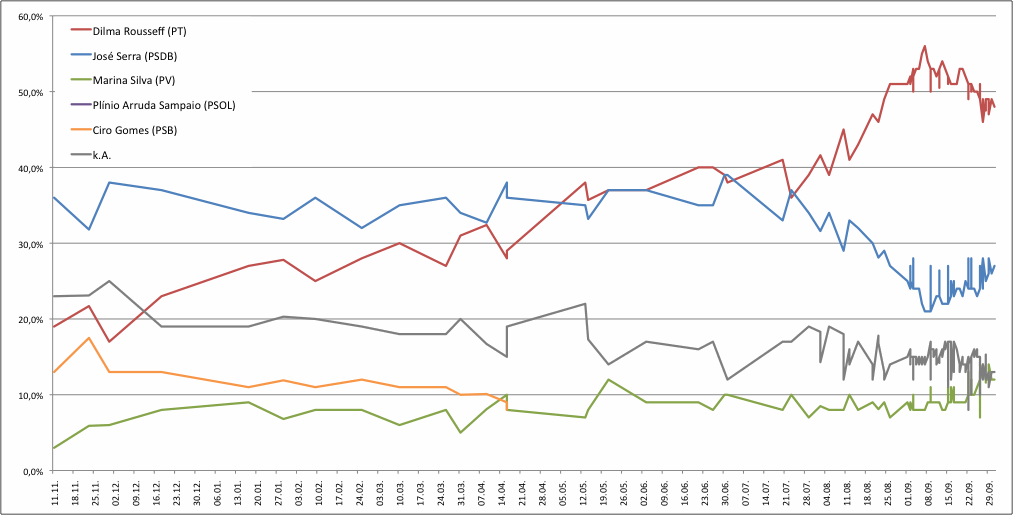
Graphic representation of polls up to 29 September 2010.

Pollster/client(s)	Date(s) conducted	Rousseff PT	Serra PSDB	Silva PV	Others	Abst. Undec.	Lead
2010 election	3 Oct	46.91%	32.61%	19.33%	1.15%	8.64%	14.3%
Vox Populi	2 Oct	47%	26%	14%	0%	13%	21%
Ibope	1–2 Oct	47%	29%	16%	0%	8%	18%
Datafolha	1–2 Oct	47%	29%	16%	0%	8%	18%
Vox Populi	1 Oct	48%	27%	12%	0%	13%	21%
Vox Populi	30 Sep	49%	26%	12%	0%	13%	23%
Vox Populi	29 Sep	49%	26%	12%	0%	13%	23%
Datafolha	28–29 Sep	47%	28%	14%	0%	11%	19%
Vox Populi	28 Sep	49%	25%	12%	0%	14%	24%
Datafolha	27 Sep	46%	28%	14%	0%	12%	18%
Vox Populi	27 Sep	49%	24%	13%	0%	14%	25%
CNT/Sensus	26–28 Sep	47.5%	25.6%	11.6%	0.0%	15.3%	21.9%
Vox Populi	26 Sep	49%	24%	12%	0%	15%	25%
Ibope	25–26 Sep	50%	27%	13%	0%	10%	23%
Vox Populi	25 Sep	50%	23%	11%	0%	16%	27%
Vox Populi	24 Sep	50%	24%	10%	0%	16%	26%
Vox Populi	23 Sep	51%	24%	10%	0%	15%	27%
Vox Populi	22 Sep	51%	24%	10%	0%	15%	27%
Ibope	21–23 Sep	50%	28%	12%	0%	10%	22%
Datafolha	21–22 Sep	49%	28%	13%	0%	10%	21%
Vox Populi	21 Sep	52%	25%	9%	0%	14%	27%
Vox Populi	20 Sep	53%	23%	9%	0%	15%	30%
Vox Populi	19 Sep	53%	24%	9%	0%	14%	29%
Vox Populi	18 Sep	51%	24%	9%	0%	16%	27%
Vox Populi	17 Sep	51%	23%	9%	0%	17%	28%
Vox Populi	16 Sep	51%	23%	9%	0%	17%	28%
Vox Populi	15 Sep	52%	22%	9%	0%	17%	30%
Ibope	14–17 Sep	51%	25%	11%	0%	13%	26%
Vox Populi	14 Sep	53%	22%	8%	0%	17%	31%
Datafolha	13–15 Sep	51%	27%	11%	0%	11%	24%
Vox Populi	13 Sep	54%	22%	8%	0%	16%	32%
Vox Populi	12 Sep	53%	23%	9%	0%	15%	30%
Vox Populi	12 Sep	52%	23%	9%	0%	16%	29%
CNT/Sensus	10–12 Sep	50.5%	26.4%	8.9%	0.0%	14.2%	24.1%
Vox Populi	10 Sep	53%	22%	9%	0%	16%	31%
Vox Populi	9 Sep	53%	21%	9%	0%	17%	32%
Datafolha	8–9 Sep	50%	27%	11%	0%	12%	23%
Vox Populi	8 Sep	54%	21%	9%	0%	15%	33%
Vox Populi	7 Sep	56%	21%	8%	0%	15%	35%
Vox Populi	6 Sep	55%	22%	8%	0%	15%	33%
Vox Populi	5 Sep	53%	24%	8%	0%	15%	29%
Vox Populi	4 Sep	53%	24%	8%	0%	15%	29%
Vox Populi	3 Sep	52%	24%	8%	0%	16%	28%
Datafolha	2–3 Sep	50%	28%	10%	0%	12%	22%
Vox Populi	2 Sep	51%	25%	9%	0%	15%	26%
Vox Populi	1 Sep	51%	25%	9%	0%	15%	26%
Ibope	31 Aug–2 Sep	51%	27%	8%	0%	14%	24%
Ibope	24–26 Aug	51%	27%	7%	0%	15%	24%
Datafolha	23–24 Aug	49%	29%	9%	0%	13%	20%
CNT/Sensus	20–22 Aug	46.0%	28.1%	8.1%	1.3% (Note: Eymael (PSDC) with 0.3%; Plínio de Arruda (PSOL) with 0.4%; Rui Costa (PCO) with 0.2%; José Maria (PSTU) with 0.4%)	17.8%	17.9%
Datafolha	20 Aug	47%	30%	9%	0%	14%	17%
Ibope	12–15 Aug	43%	32%	8%	0%	17%	11%
Datafolha	9–12 Aug	41%	33%	10%	0%	16%	8%
Vox Populi	7–10 Aug	45%	29%	8%	0%	18%	16%
Ibope	2–5 Aug	39%	34%	8%	0%	19%	5%
CNT/Sensus	31 Jul–2 Aug	41.6%	31.6%	8.5%	4.4% (Note: Ivan Pinheiro (PCB) with 0.1%; Eymael (PSDC) with 0.5%; Levy Fidelix (PRTB) with 0.1%; Plínio de Arruda (PSOL) with 1.7%; Rui Costa (PCO) with 0.1%; José Maria (PSTU) with 1.9%)	18.3%	10%
Ibope	26–29 Jul	39%	34%	7%	0%	19%	5%
Datafolha	20–23 Jul	36%	37%	10%	0%	17%	1%
Vox Populi	17–20 Aug	41%	33%	8%	0%	17%	8%
Datafolha	30 Jun–1 Jul	38%	39%	10%	0%	12%	1%
Ibope	27–30 Jun	39%	39%	10%	0%	13%	Tie
Vox Populi	24–26 Jun	40%	35%	8%	0%	17%	5%
CNI/Ibope	19–21 Jun	40%	35%	9%	0%	16%	5%
Ibope	31 May–3 Jun	37%	37%	9%	0%	17%	Tie
Datafolha	20–21 May	37%	37%	12%	0%	14%	Tie
CNT/Sensus	10–14 May	35.7%	33.2%	8.0%	2.2% (Note: Eymael (PSDC) with 1.1%; Levy Fidelix (PRTB) with 0.1%; Plínio de Arruda Sampaio (PSOL) with 0.4%; Rui Costa Pimenta (PCO) with 0.2%; José Maria (PSTU) with 0.4%)	17.3%	2.5%
Vox Populi	8–13 May	38%	35%	7%	0%	22%	3%
Datafolha	15–16 Apr	28%	38%	10%	10% (Note: Ciro Gomes (PSB) with 9%; José Maria (PSTU) with 1%)	15%	10%
Ibope	13–16 Apr	29%	36%	8%	8% (Note: Ciro Gomes (PSB) with 8%)	19%	7%
CNT/Sensus	5–9 Apr	32.4%	32.7%	8.1%	10.1% (Note: Ciro Gomes (PSB) with 10.1%)	16.7%	0.3%
Vox Populi	30–31 Mar	31%	34%	5%	10% (Note: Ciro Gomes (PSB) with 10%)	20%	3%
Datafolha	25–26 Mar	27%	36%	8%	11% (Note: Ciro Gomes (PSB) with 11%)	18%	9%
Ibope	6–10 Mar	30%	35%	6%	11%	18%	5%
Datafolha	24–25 Feb	28%	32%	8%	12% (Note: Ciro Gomes (PSB) with 12%)	19%	4%
Ibope	6–9 Feb	25%	36%	8%	11%	20%	11%
CNT/Sensus	25–29 Jan	27.8%	33.2%	6.8%	11.9% (Note: Ciro Gomes (PSB) with 11.9%)	20.3%	5.4%
Vox Populi	14–17 Jan	27%	34%	9%	11%	19%	7%
Datafolha	14–18 Dec 2009	23%	37%	8%	13% (Note: Ciro Gomes (PSB) with 13%)	19%	14%
Ibope	26–30 Nov 2009	17%	38%	6%	13%	25%	21%
CNT/Sensus	23 Nov 2009	21.7%	31.8%	5.9%	17.5% (Note: Ciro Gomes (PSB) with 17.5%)	23.1%	10.1%
Vox Populi	11 Nov 2009	19%	36%	3%	19% (Note: Ciro Gomes (PSB) with 13%; Heloísa Helena (PSOL) with 6%)	23%	17%
CNT/Sensus	8 Sep 2009	19%	39.5%	4.8%	9.7% (Note: Heloísa Helena (PSOL) with 9.7%)	27%	20.5%
Vox Populi	18 Aug 2009	21%	30%	–	29% (Note: Ciro Gomes (PSB) with 17%; Heloísa Helena (PSOL) with 12%)	20%	9%
Datafolha	16 Aug 2009	17%	38%	3%	26% (Note: Ciro Gomes (PSB) with 14%; Heloísa Helena (PSOL) with 12%)	18%	21%
Ibope	9 Jun 2009	18%	38%	–	19% (Note: Ciro Gomes (PSB) with 12%; Heloísa Helena (PSOL) with 7%)	25%	20%
Datafolha	28 May 2009	16%	38%	–	25% (Note: Ciro Gomes (PSB) with 15%; Heloísa Helena (PSOL) with 10%)	21%	22%
Datafolha	19 Mar 2009	11%	41%	–	27% (Note: Ciro Gomes (PSB) with 16%; Heloísa Helena (PSOL) with 11%)	21%	25%
Datafolha	28 Nov 2008	8%	41%	–	29% (Note: Ciro Gomes (PSB) with 15%; Heloísa Helena (PSOL) with 14%)	21%	26%
Datafolha	27 Mar 2008	3%	38%	–	34% (Note: Ciro Gomes (PSB) with 20%; Heloísa Helena (PSOL) with 14%)	25%	18%

=== Second round ===
Pollster/client(s)	Date(s) conducted	Rousseff PT	Serra PSDB	Abst. Undec.	Lead
2010 election	31 Oct	56.05%	43.95%	6.70%	12.1%
Vox Populi	30 Oct	51%	39%	10%	12%
Datafolha	29–30 Oct	51%	41%	8%	10%
CNT/Sensus	28–29 Oct	50.3%	37.6%	12.1%	12.7%
Datafolha	28 Oct	50%	40%	10%	10%
Ibope	27–30 Oct	52%	40%	8%	12%
Datafolha	27 Oct	49%	38%	13%	11%
Ibope	26–28 Oct	52%	39%	9%	13%
CNT/Sensus	23–25 Oct	51.9%	36.7%	11.4%	15.2%
Vox Populi	23–24 Oct	49%	38%	13%	11%
Datafolha	21 Oct	50%	40%	10%	10%
CNT/Sensus	18–19 Oct	46.8%	41.8%	11.4%	5.0%
Ibope	17–20 Oct	51%	40%	9%	11%
Vox Populi	15–17 Oct	51%	39%	10%	12%
Datafolha	14–15 Oct	47%	41%	12%	6%
CNT/Sensus	11–13 Oct	46.8%	42.7%	10.5	4.1%
Ibope	11–13 Oct	49%	43%	8%	6%
Vox Populi	10–11 Oct	48%	40%	12%	8%
Datafolha	8 Oct	48%	41%	11%	7%

== See also ==
- Opinion polling for the 2018 Brazilian presidential election
- Opinion polling for the 2022 Brazilian presidential election
- Opinion polling for the 2026 Brazilian presidential election
