= Change Brazil =

Change Brazil Muda Brasil
- Leader(s): José Serra (2010–2013); Aécio Neves (2013–2017)
- Founded: 2010
- Dissolved: 2018
- Ideology: Catch-all coalition Third Way; Anti-Lulism
- Political position: Centre

Brazil Can Do More (Portuguese: O Brasil pode mais), renamed Change Brazil (Portuguese: Muda Brasil) as of 2014, was a centrist electoral coalition in Brazil formed around the centrist Brazilian Social Democracy Party (PSDB) for the 2010 presidential election. It was formed by six parties: PSDB, Democrats (DEM), Brazilian Labour Party (PTB), Popular Socialist Party (PPS), Party of National Mobilization (PMN) and Labour Party of Brazil (PTdoB). Its presidential candidate was former São Paulo Governor José Serra from PSDB and the vice-presidential candidate was Rio de Janeiro federal deputy Indio da Costa from DEM.

On October 3, Serra was the second most-voted candidate at the presidential election. Because the most voted candidate, Dilma Rousseff, was not able to get 50%+1 of the unspoilt votes, she faced Serra in a run-off on October 31, which Rousseff won.

At the legislative election, the Brazil Can Do More coalition gained 136 out of 513 seats in the Chamber of Deputies, as well as 25 out of 81 seats in the Federal Senate. This result was an all-time low for the Lulist opposition. On the other hand, the center-left For Brazil to Keep on Changing coalition, which gathered around Lula's chosen successor Dilma Rousseff, reached an all-time high.

For the 2014 elections, the alliance changed its name to Change Brazil (Portuguese: Muda Brasil) and was led by Aécio Neves. The coalition once again lost the election.

In 2017, Aécio Neves was forced to step down from the coalition leadership after he got involved in a series of corruption scandals including Operation Car Wash.

The coalition was dissolved in 2018, with its parties supporting different candidates in the 2018 general election.

== Composition ==
Party	Main ideology	Leader/s
Brazilian Social Democracy Party	Third Way	Geraldo Alckmin
Brazilian Labour Party	Populism	Roberto Jefferson
Democrats	Liberal conservatism	Antônio Carlos Magalhães Neto
Solidariedade	Social democracy	Paulo Pereira da Silva
National Labour Party	Centrism	Renata Abreu
Party of National Mobilization	Populism	Antonio Carlos Bosco Massarollo
National Ecologic Party	Christian democracy	Adilson Barroso
Christian Labour Party	Christian democracy	Daniel Tourinho
Labour Party of Brazil	Centrism	Luis Tibé

== Electoral results ==
=== Presidential elections ===
2010
Round	Candidate	Running mate	Votes	%
1st	José Serra	Indio da Costa	33,132,283	32,61%
2nd	José Serra	Indio da Costa	43,711,388	43.95%

2014
Round	Candidate	Running mate	Votes	%
1st	Aécio Neves	Aloysio Nunes	34,897,211	33.55%
2nd	Aécio Neves	Aloysio Nunes	51,041,155	48.36%

=== Legislative elections ===
Chamber of Deputies
Election year	# of overall votes	% of overall vote	# of overall seats won	+/–	Leader
2010	27,082,726 (#2)	28.0	136 / 513	–	Henrique Eduardo Alves
2014	24,706,769 (#2)	25.52	128 / 513	▼8	Aécio Neves

Federal Senate
Election year	# of overall votes	% of overall vote	# of overall seats won	+/–	Leader
2010	57,617,892 (#2)	33.8	25 / 81	–	Henrique Eduardo Alves
2014	30,729,552 (#2)	34.47	19 / 81	▼6	Aécio Neves
