= With the Strength of the People =

With the Strength of the People Coligação Com a Força do Povo
- Leader: Dilma Rousseff
- Founded: 2010
- Dissolved: 2016
- Ideology: Social democracy Left-wing populism Progressivism; Lulism
- Political position: Centre-left to left-wing

With the Strength of the People (Portuguese: Coligação Com a Força do Povo), until 2014 named For Brazil to Keep on Changing (Portuguese: Para o Brasil Seguir Mudando, pronounced [ˈpaɾɐ u bɾaˈziw seˈɡiʁ muˈdɐ̃du]), was a left-wing electoral coalition formed around the democratic socialist Workers' Party (PT) in Brazil for the 2010 presidential election. It consisted of ten parties: the Worker's Party (PT), Brazilian Democratic Movement Party (PMDB), Communist Party of Brazil (PCdoB), Democratic Labour Party (PDT), Brazilian Republican Party (PRB), Party of the Republic (PR), Brazilian Socialist Party (PSB), Social Christian Party (PSC), Christian Labour Party (PTC) and National Labor Party (PTN). On October 14, they were unofficially joined by the Progressive Party (PP). The coalition's presidential candidate was Dilma Rousseff from the PT while the vice-presidential candidate was Michel Temer from the PMDB. They were finally elected on October 31, 2010.

For the 2014 election, the coalition changed its name to 'With the Strength of the People' and was joined by the newly created Social Democratic Party (PSD) and Republican Party of the Social Order (PROS); the PSB left the Dilma administration in order to launch the candidacy of Eduardo Campos, while the PSC launched the candidacy of Pastor Everaldo. The PTC and PTN both decided to support Aécio Neves, from the rival centrist Change Brazil coalition.

== History ==
=== 2010 election ===
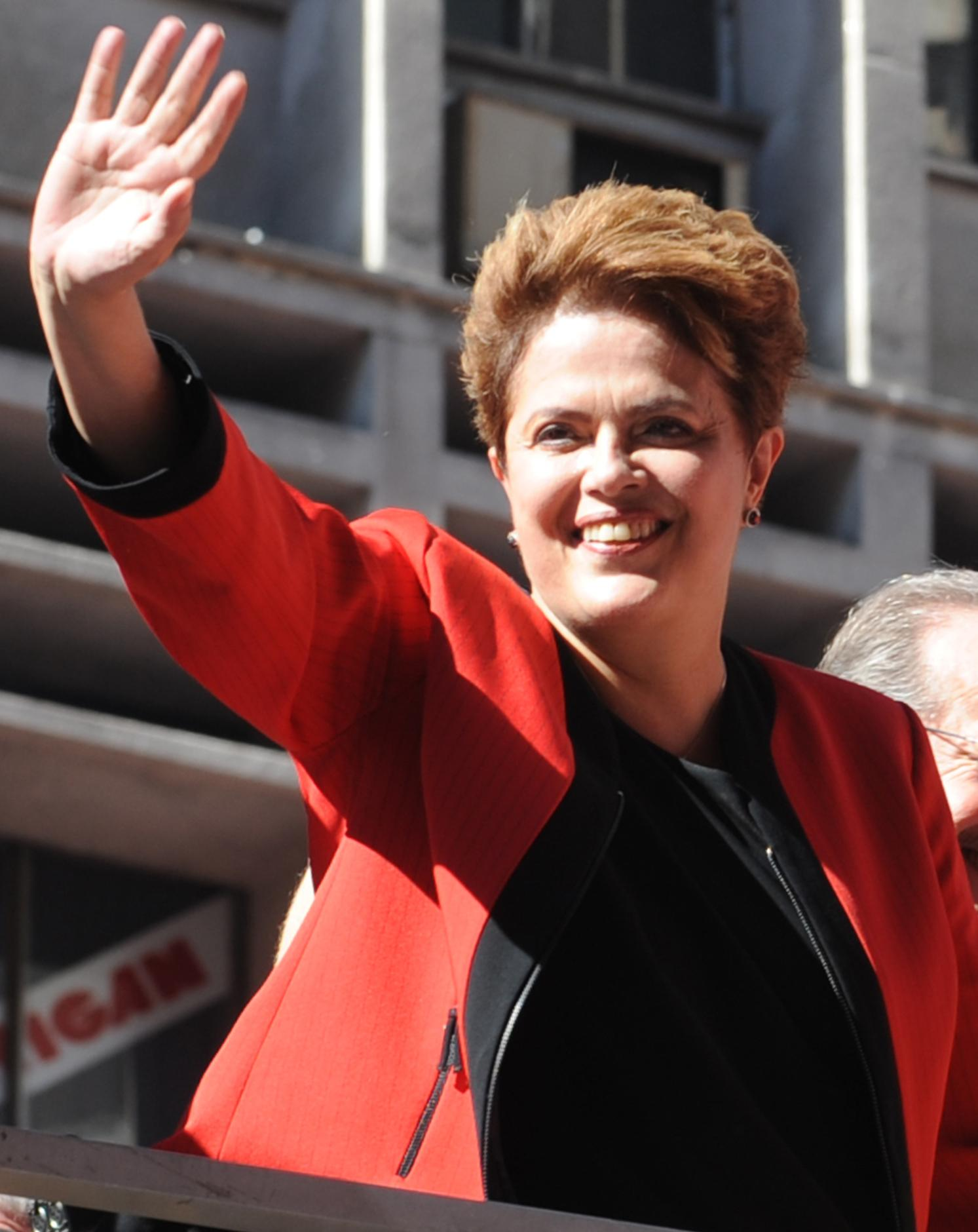
Dilma Rousseff, President of Brazil and For Brazil to keep on changing presidential candidate.

On October 3, Rousseff won a plurality of votes at the presidential election. Achieving over 47 million votes, she became the most voted-for female in the Americas. However, according to Brazilian law, she had to face a run-off against the second highest candidate – José Serra from the Brazilian Social Democratic Party (PSDB) – on October 31, as she was not able to win more than 50% of unspoilt votes and therefore the majority of votes.

At the parliamentary election held that same day, the For Brazil to Keep on Changing coalition gained control of 352 out of the 513 seats in the Chamber of Deputies, as well as 54 out of the 81 seats in the Federal Senate. This gave Rousseff a broad majority in both houses, which the previous PT administration, led by President Luiz Inácio Lula da Silva, never had. The coalition was also able to elect 11 out of the 18 governorships that were decided in the first round. It gained control of five further governorships on October 31 among the ten states which had run-off voting.

Results of the presidential election: Rousseff Serra ██ 50%–55% ██ ██ 55%–60% ██ ██ 60%–65% ██ ██ 65%–80% ██

The same election also saw a major decrease in the number of seats controlled by the centre-right opposition, which gathered around the Brazil Can Do More coalition led by former São Paulo Governor José Serra. It shrank from 133 to 111 deputies and from 38 to 27 Senators. It elected 7 out of the 18 governor seats defined on October 3, gaining control of four more on October 31. On the other hand, the left-wing opposition, formed by the PSOL, which had broken away from the PT, retained control of its three seats in the Chamber and gained one seat in the Senate.

On the second round, the For Brazil to Keep on Changing coalition received the support of the PP, which had remained neutral in the first round, although most of its directories had already supported Rousseff. The PSOL instructed its members not to give any votes to Serra. While its presidential candidate Plínio de Arruda Sampaio advocated casting blank votes, the party's Congressmen advocated a "critical vote" on Rousseff.

=== Dilma Rousseff cabinet ===
On December 22, 2010, Dilma Rousseff appointed all 38 members of her cabinet. She handed out offices to six out of the ten political parties that formed the For Brazil to Keep on Changing coalition, in addition to the PP.

However, with the dismissal of Nelson Jobim, former Minister of Defense, on August 4, 2011, the PT presence in the Dilma cabinet increased to almost 45%, while the PMDB presence was reduced to 13.5%. This happened because Rousseff named Celso Amorim, a PT member, to replace Jobim. After the last cabinet reform, in January 2014, 17 ministers were from the PT, 3 were from the PMDB, 2 from the PR, 1 from the PCdoB, 1 from the PP, 1 from the PRB, 1 from the PDT, and 1 from the PSD while 12 were independents.

The PSB pulled out of the Dilma Rousseff cabinet on September 18, 2013, in order to launch the candidacy of the late Eduardo Campos. The Social Christian Party departed from the Rousseff administration in January 2014 in order to launch the candidacy of Pastor Everaldo, who, unlike Dilma, had a strong neoliberal stance, promising to privatize Petrobras. Another Christian party, the PTC, decided to support Aécio Neves' Brazil Can Do More coalition, as did the PTN.

=== 2014 election ===
For the 2014 election, the coalition changed its name to With the Strength of the People (Portuguese: Com a Força do Povo) and was formed by the PT, PMDB, PCdoB, PDT, PRB, PR, PP, PSD and PROS.

=== Impeachment of Dilma Rousseff ===
The coalition was dissolved in 2016 because of different position about the impeachment of Dilma Rousseff: PT, PCdoB and PDT voted against the impeachment, while PMDB, PSD, PP, PR, PRB and PROS voted in favour and later supported the presidency of Michel Temer.

== Composition ==
Party	Main ideology	Leader(s)
Workers' Party (PT)	Social democracy	Gleisi Hoffmann
Brazilian Democratic Movement Party (PMDB)	Catch-all	Romero Jucá
Social Democratic Party (PSD)	Economic liberalism	Alfredo Cotait Neto
Progressive Party (PP)	Liberal conservatism	Ciro Nogueira
Party of the Republic (PR)	Populism	Antonio Carlos Rodrigues
Brazilian Republican Party (PRB)	Christian democracy	Marcos Pereira
Democratic Labour Party (PDT)	Social democracy	Carlos Lupi
Republican Party of the Social Order (PROS)	Centrism	Eurípedes Júnior
Communist Party of Brazil (PCdoB)	Marxism-Leninism	Luciana Santos

== Electoral results ==
=== Presidential elections ===
2010
Round	Candidate	Running mate	Votes	%
1st	Rousseff	Michel Temer	47,651,434	46.9%
2nd	Rousseff	Michel Temer	55,752,483	56.0%

2014
Round	Candidate	Running mate	Votes	%
1st	Rousseff	Michel Temer	43,267,668	41.59%
2nd	Rousseff	Michel Temer	54,501,119	51.64%

=== Parliamentary elections ===
Chamber of Deputies
Election year	# of overall votes	% of overall vote	# of overall seats won	+/–	Leader
2010	56,076,454 (#1)	58.1	359 / 513	–	Fernando Ferro
2014	53,894,012 (#1)	55.7	308 / 513	▼51	Rui Falcão

Federal Senate
Election year	# of overall votes	% of overall vote	# of overall seats won	+/–	Leader
2010	94,049,918 (#1)	55.2	53 / 81	–	Fernando Ferro
2014	44,009,313 (#1)	49.4	56 / 81	▲3	Rui Falcão
