= United Socialist Workers' Party =

Political party in Brazil

United Socialist Workers' Party Partido Socialista dos Trabalhadores Unificado
- President: José Maria de Almeida
- Founded: 5 June 1994
- Registered: 19 December 1995
- Split from: Workers' Party
- Newspaper: Opinião Socialista
- Youth wing: Coletivo Rebeldia
- Women's wing: Secretaria Nacional de Mulheres
- LGBT wing: Secretaria LGBT
- Black wing: Raça e Classe
- Membership (December 2019): 15,873
- Ideology: Anti-capitalism; Communism; Socialism; Trotskyism; Internationalism; Morenism
- Political position: Left-wing to far-left
- International affiliation: IWL-FI
- Colours: Red; Yellow

Party flag

Website
- pstu.org.br

The United Socialist Workers' Party (Portuguese: Partido Socialista dos Trabalhadores Unificado, PSTU) is a Trotskyist party in Brazil. It is the largest section of the International Workers' League (Fourth International) (LIT), an international body of groups in the Morenoist tradition.

== History ==
=== Early history ===
The origins of the PSTU can be traced to 1972 when a number of Brazilian militants from a variety of political backgrounds contacted the reunified Fourth International (FI). These militants formed the Starting Point group in Salvador Allende's Chile, only to find themselves dispersed in 1973 when Allende's government was overthrown. Some members of Turning Point fled to Argentina and founded the Workers League.

Returning to Brazil in 1974, the Workers League commenced publication of the magazine Workers Independence and recruited new members from within the student movement. By 1977 the group had grown to 300 members. At that point, Nahuel Moreno of the Argentinian Socialist Workers Party (PST) organised the Bolshevik Faction within the FI, to which the Workers League adhered.

In 1978, the Workers League formed the Movimento Convergência Socialista (CS) as part of a tactic aimed at the establishment of a new mass socialist party. The Workers League also renamed itself the Socialist Workers Party (PST). Later in the year a number of members were jailed, alongside them Nahuel Moreno. An international campaign for their release won the support of Gabriel García Márquez.

By 1979, CS was part of a growing campaign for a new Workers' Party and played an important role in the metal working strikes that took place in the ABC region that year. In January the PST fully integrated itself into the CS ending its separate organisational form. The following year again saw CS taking a role in the important 40-day strike in the ABC region. Its own growth was marked by the attendance of 3,000 people at a rally of the CS and Moreno's international tendency, then linked to Pierre Lambert's France-based tendency. By 1982 Moreno and Lambert had parted company and the former organised the International Workers' League (Fourth International) to which CS affiliated.

In the early 1980s, CS took part in the founding of the Central Unica dos Trabalhadores (CUT) union centre as strikes spread through Brazil along with other forms of social unrest. They were also to form part of the Workers' Party when it was founded in 1980 and recognised officially by the state in 1982. As an officially recognised platform or faction of the PT, the CS saw a number of its members elected to national, state and local legislative bodies during the 1980s.

=== Recent history ===
The affiliation of CS with the PT was not to last and by late 1991 the leadership of the latter was concerned at the activities of some PT factions particularly CS. This situation arose due to the involvement of CS in extra-parliamentary struggles and deepened in 1992 as the CS campaigned against the government of Fernando Collor de Mello and the International Monetary Fund. The situation continued to deteriorate and in June CS was expelled from PT. In response the CS formed the Revolutionary Front which at a Congress in April 1993 became the PSTU with the fusion of CS into the new party alongside a number of smaller groups including Democracia Operária (RS), the PFS, MSR (PE), Liga and the CS. 21 of April Movement.

Since then the PSTU has continued as a persistent presence in the Brazilian labour and social movements to the left of the PT. It has lost a number of members in splits, most recently to the newly formed PSOL, which it refused to become a part of. It contests national and local elections and is involved in social movements, particularly the labor movement and student movement. The PSTU publishes the weekly newspaper Opinião Socialista (Socialist Opinion) and is the main group contributing to the journal Marxism Alive/Marxismo Vivo.

The PSTU is the Brazilian section of the International Workers League – Fourth International (Lit) with which the Italian Progetto Comunista - Rifondare l'Opposizione dei Lavoratori (PC-ROL) has for a long time had a close political relationship and mutual collaboration. The PSTU first took part in elections in the Third Pole that supported the candidacy of Heloísa Helena Lima de Moraes Carvalho, former member of the PT (the party of Luiz Inácio Lula da Silva) expelled from the PT with others for her opposition to the reform of pensions (in 2008 she became leader of the Socialism and Liberty Party with Ivan Valente and Luciana Genro).

In the 2010 presidential election, the PSTU candidate received 0.08% of votes (88,000).

== Election results ==
=== Presidential election ===
Election	Candidate	Running mate	Coalition	First round		Second round		Result
Election	Candidate	Running mate	Coalition	Votes	%	Votes	%	Result
1998	Zé Maria (PSTU)	José Galvão de Lima (PSTU)	None	202,659	0.30%	–	–	Lost ✗
2002	Zé Maria (PSTU)	Dayse Oliveira (PSTU)	None	402,236	0.47%	–	–	Lost ✗
2006	Heloísa Helena (PSOL)	César Benjamin (PSOL)	PSOL; PCB; PSTU	6,575,393	6.75%	–	–	Lost ✗
2010	Zé Maria (PSTU)	Cláudia Durans (PSTU)	None	84,609	0.08%	–	–	Lost ✗
2014	Zé Maria (PSTU)	Cláudia Durans (PSTU)	None	91,209	0.09%	–	–	Lost ✗
2018	Vera Lúcia Salgado (PSTU)	Hertz Dias (PSTU)	None	55,762	0.05%	–	–	Lost ✗
2022	Vera Lúcia Salgado (PSTU)	Kunã Yporã Tremembé (PSTU)	None	25,625	0.02%	–	–	Lost ✗
2026	Hertz Dias (PSTU)	Vanessa Portugal (PSTU)	None	42,979	0.04%	–	–	Lost ✗

=== Legislative elections ===
Election	Chamber of Deputies				Federal Senate				Role in government
Election	Votes	%	Seats	+/–	Votes	%	Seats	+/–	Role in government
1994	154,666 (Note: Votes obtained in coalition with PV, PCB and PRTB.)	0.34%	0 / 513	New	674,856	0.70%	0 / 81	New	Extra-parliamentary
1998	187,675	0.28%	0 / 513	0	371,618	0.60%	0 / 81	0	Extra-parliamentary
2002	159,251	0.18%	0 / 513	0	490,251	0.32%	0 / 81	0	Extra-parliamentary
2006	101,307	0.11%	0 / 513	0	196,636	0.23%	0 / 81	0	Extra-parliamentary
2010	102,120	0.11%	0 / 513	0	436,192	0.26%	0 / 81	0	Extra-parliamentary
2014	188,473	0.19%	0 / 513	0	355,585	0.40%	0 / 81	0	Extra-parliamentary
2018	41,304	0.04%	0 / 513	0	413,914	0.24%	0 / 81	0	Extra-parliamentary
2022	27,905	0.03%	0 / 513	0	135,599	0.13%	0 / 81	0	Extra-parliamentary
2026	18,696	0.02%	0 / 513	0	216,829	0.10%	0 / 81	0	Extra-parliamentary

Preceded by 15 - BDM (MDB)	Numbers of Brazilian Official Political Parties; 16 - USWP (PSTU)	Succeeded by 18 – NETWORK (REDE)
