= Vera Lúcia Salgado =

Brazilian politician

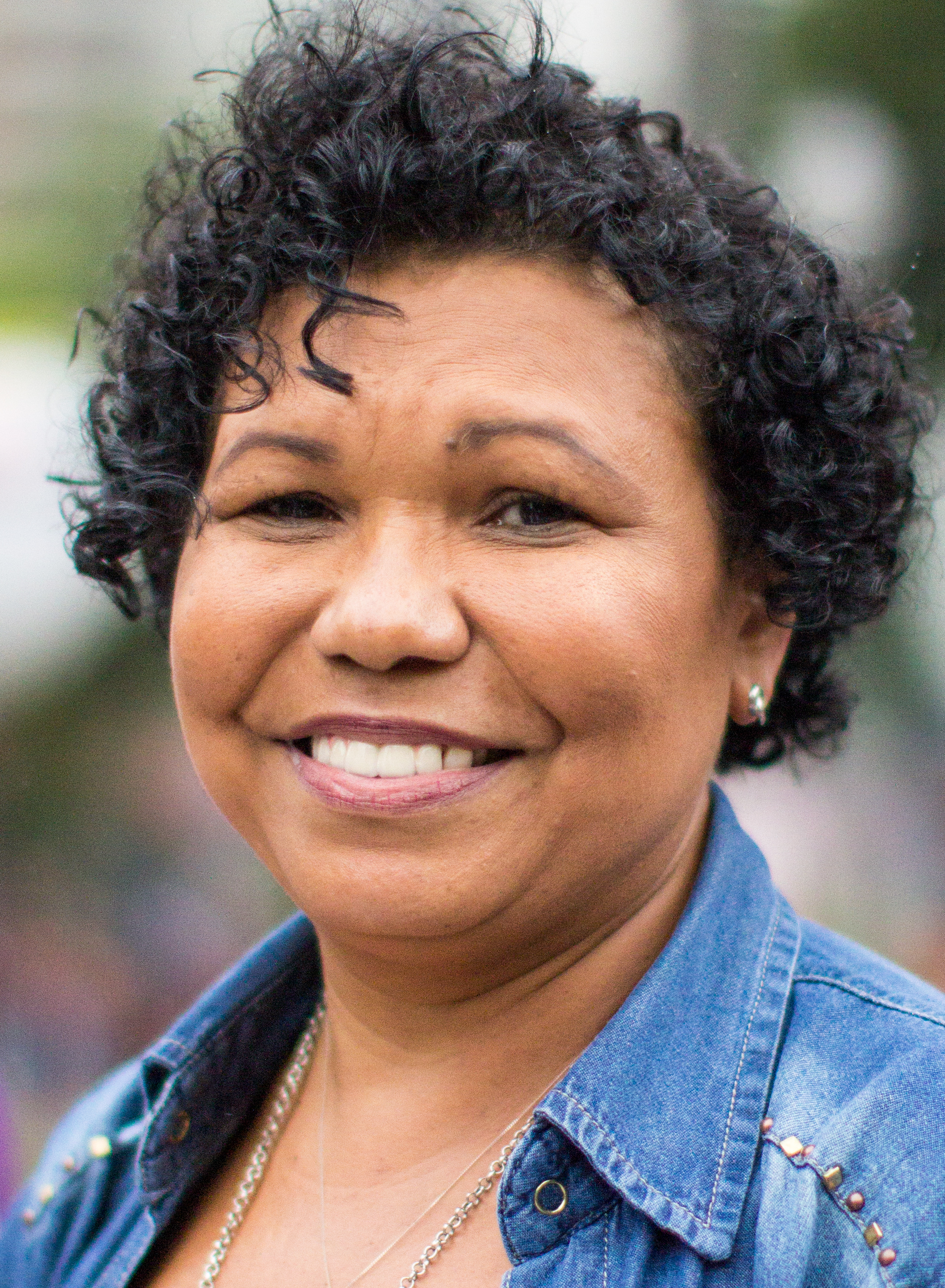

Personal details
- Born: Vera Lúcia Pereira da Silva Salgado; 12 September 1967 (age 59) Inajá, Pernambuco, Brazil
- Party: PSTU (1994–present)
- Other political affiliations: PT (1992)
- Education: Federal University of Sergipe

Vera Lúcia Pereira da Silva Salgado (born 12 September 1967) better known as Vera Lúcia is a Brazilian politician affiliated with the Unified Workers' Socialist Party. She has contested elections many times, including the 2018 Brazilian presidential election, but has not been elected to public office.

== Personal life ==
Salgado grew up the youngest of 10 children, in a poor Afro-Brazilian family in the state of Pernambuco. In her youth she worked in the shoe making industry, and became involved in trade unionist organizations as a result of the companies taking advantage of their workers. Throughout her life Salgado has worked various jobs to sustain herself, such as a being a waitress, cleaning lady, and even a typist. She is an alumna of the Federal University of Sergipe.

== Political career ==
Originally affiliated with the Worker's Party, Salgado and several other politicians were expelled in 1992 after supporting the impeachment of then president Fernando Collor de Mello. In 1994 she joined the newly formed Unified Workers' Socialist Party, and was one of the party's key founders. She is the leader for the party in the northeast division of Brazil.

Salgado has been the PSTU candidate for mayor of Aracaju in the last four elections, with the best result coming in 2012 where she received 20,241 votes, or 6.6% of the valid votes. In the 2006 Brazilian general election and the 2014 Brazilian general election she ran for the Chamber of Deputies and in 2010 was a candidate for the governor of Sergipe, although she was not successful in any of these elections. Salgado was nominated and ran for president in the 2018 election, and received 55,762 votes, or 0.05% of the valid votes.

Party political offices
Preceded by José Maria de Almeida	PSTU nominee for President of Brazil; 2018	Most recent
Preceded by Altino Prazeres	PSTU nominee for Mayor of São Paulo; 2020	Most recent
