= Antônio Pedro de Siqueira Indio da Costa =

Brazilian lawyer and politician

Indio da Costa
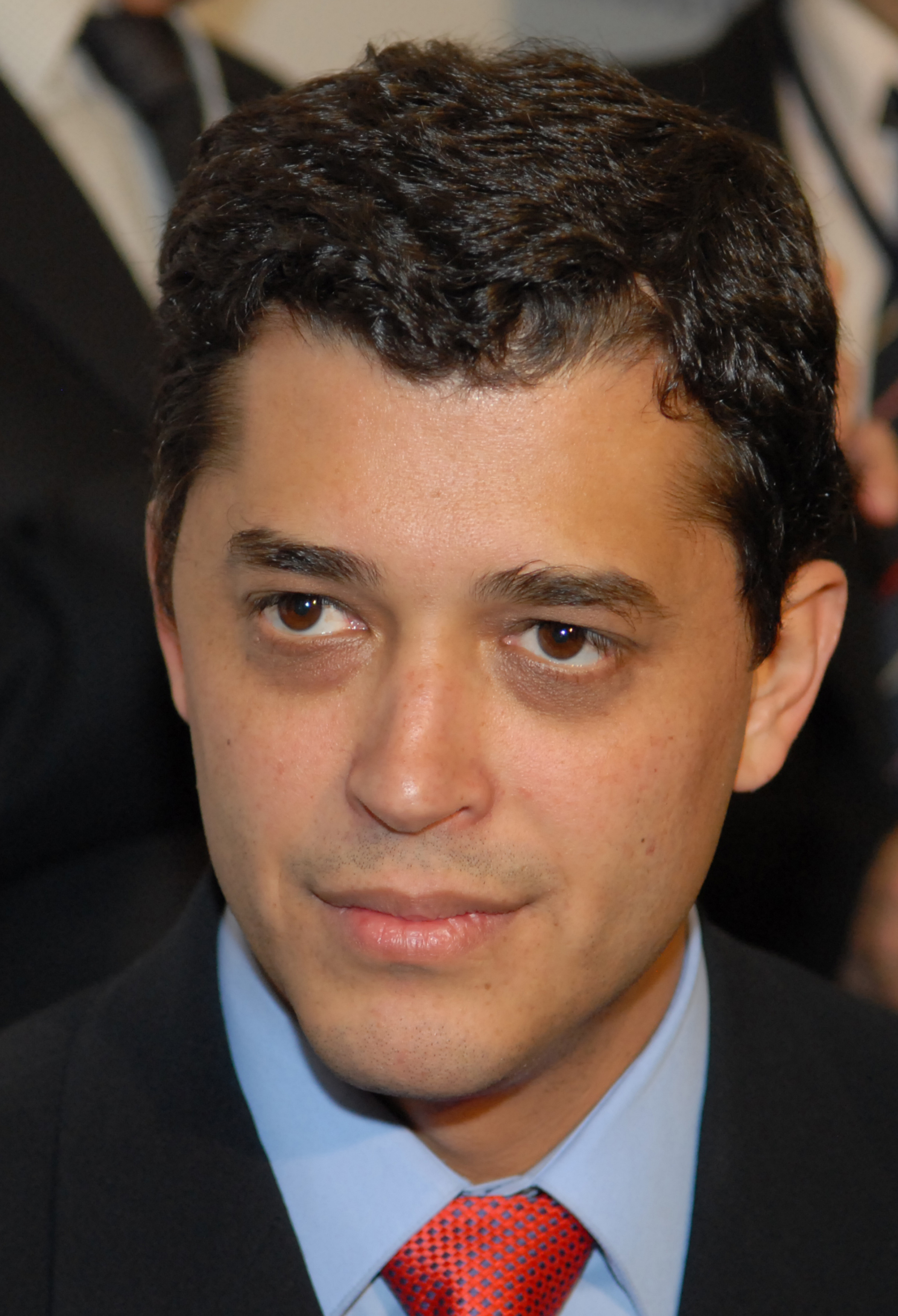

Municipal Secretary of Urbanism, Infrastructure and Housing of Rio de Janeiro
- In office 1 January 2017 – 31 January 2018
- Mayor: Marcelo Crivella

Federal Deputy from Rio de Janeiro
- In office 1 February 2015 – 1 January 2017
- In office 1 February 2007 – 1 February 2011

Municipal Secretary of Administration of Rio de Janeiro
- In office 1 January 2001 – 1 January 2007
- Mayor: César Maia

City Councillor of Rio de Janeiro
- In office 1 January 1997 – 1 February 2007

Personal details
- Born: Antônio Pedro de Siqueira Índio da Costa; 20 October 1970 (age 55) Rio de Janeiro, Rio de Janeiro, Brazil
- Party: UNIÃO (2022–present)
- Other political affiliations: PFL (1995–1999; 2001–2007); PTB (1999–2001); DEM (2007–2011); PSD (2011–2019); Independent (2019–2022)
- Children: Olivia (daughter)
- Education: Universidade Candido Mendes; Universidade Federal do Rio de Janeiro
- Website: www.indiodacosta.com.br

Antônio Pedro de Siqueira Indio da Costa (born October 20, 1970), also known as Índio da Costa, is a Brazilian lawyer and politician. On June 30, 2010, it was announced that da Costa had been chosen as the vice presidential running mate by leading presidential candidate José Serra of the PSDB party.

== Background ==
Indio da Costa holds a law degree from the Universidade Candido Mendes and has a master's degree from the Universidade Federal do Rio de Janeiro. Divorced, he has one daughter. Da Costa's cousin, Luís Octavio Indio da Costa, is a banker himself, owning the Banco Cruzeiro do Sul. Da Costa's father and brother are known as architects and designers.

== Political Life ==
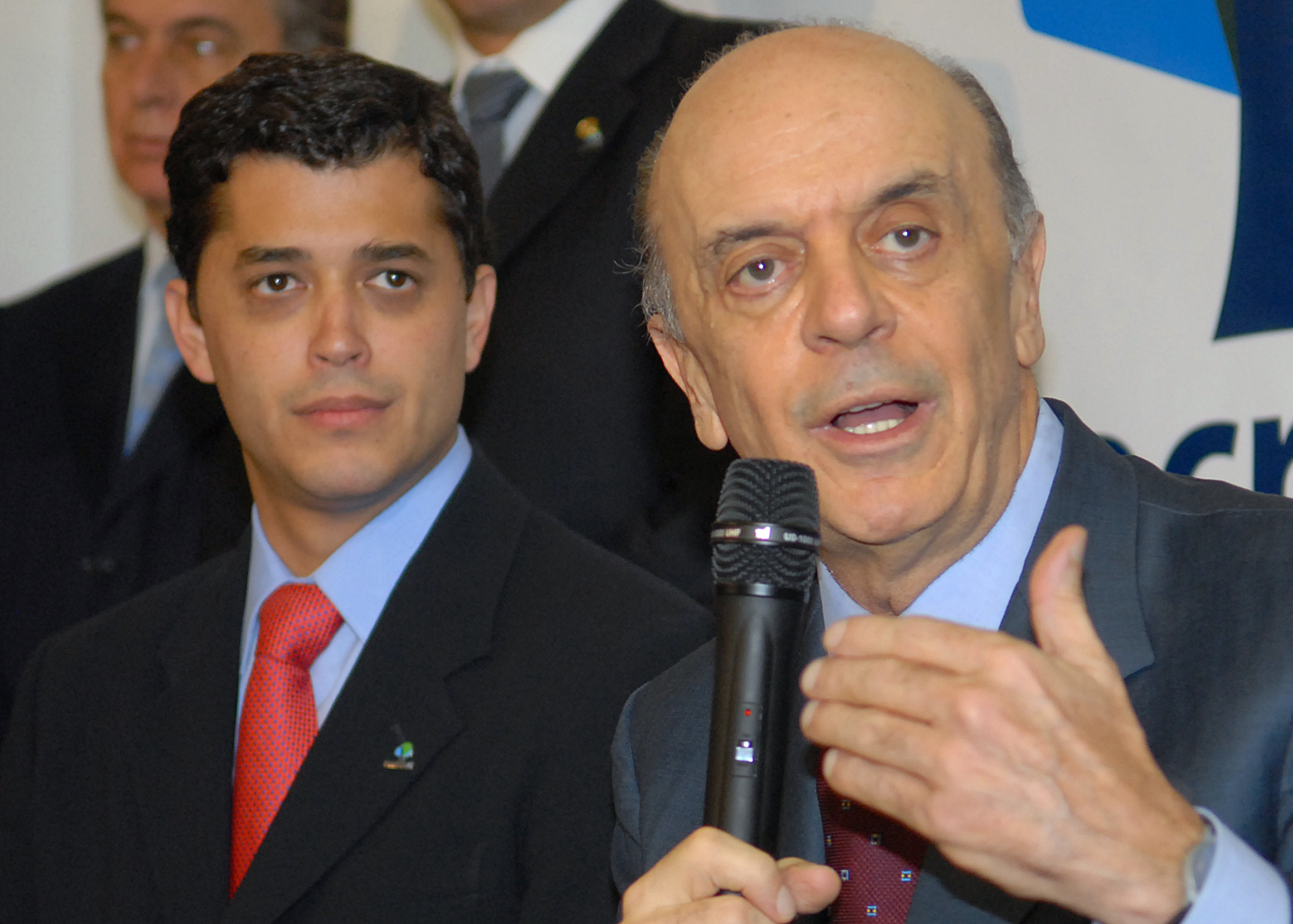
Indio da Costa and José Serra.

Indio da Costa entered politics in 1996 as part of the center-right PFL. He later joined the administration of Rio de Janeiro mayor Cesar Maia, busying himself with managing the Aterro do Flamengo gardens first and later as Secretary of Administration (i.e. as comptroller for all matters regarding personnel and public purchases) . Da Costa was elected to the Rio de Janeiro City Council in 1997, where he stayed for three terms, until 2007. As councilman, he was investigated by an inquiry commission of the same council for suspects of overpriced contracting of catering services for Rio's public schools during his earlier spell as secretary, such charges being eventually dismissed. While at the city council, he presented a polemical bill that proposed to forbid almsgiving in the city of Rio de Janeiro, subjecting it to a fine - a bill that was rejected out of hand by the city council as unconstitutional. Between 1999 and 2001, Da Costa was affiliated with the center-left PTB Party. In 2001, he returned to the PFL, which had rebranded itself as the Democrat Party (Democrats or DEM, as it is known today.)

In 2000, Da Costa spent several weeks in New York City working inside a major election operation in the United States to get acquainted with tactics and technology used in the mayoral campaign of Michael R. Bloomberg. Da Costa worked alongside Arick Wierson who was heading Bloomberg's field operations. Da Costa later announced that he had earlier implemented many of the Bloomberg's management tactics while he was Secretary for Administration in the Maia mayoralty.

In 2006, Da Costa was elected as a Brazilian Federal Deputy (Congressman) and on June 30, 2010, was chosen as the running mate to presidential candidate José Serra. - in what was seem as a move pressed on Serra by the DEM leadership, as Serra tended to favour a "pure-blooded" PSDB ticket As vice-presidential candidate, he made himself noticed mostly by his declarations accusing the Workers' Party of connections with the FARC and international drug dealing, something that earned him the nickname of "Serra['s] Palin".

After the results of the 2010 election, which by the popular vote elected Dilma Rousseff as Brazil's first female president, Indio da Costa parted from his former political party "DEM" to become one of the founders of the PSD "Social Democrats Party" along with the then Mayor of São Paulo, Gilberto Kassab.

== Notes ==
Party political offices
| Preceded by José Jorge (as PFL) | Democrats nominee for Vice President of Brazil; 2010 | Most recent |
