= José Maria de Almeida =

Brazilian politician

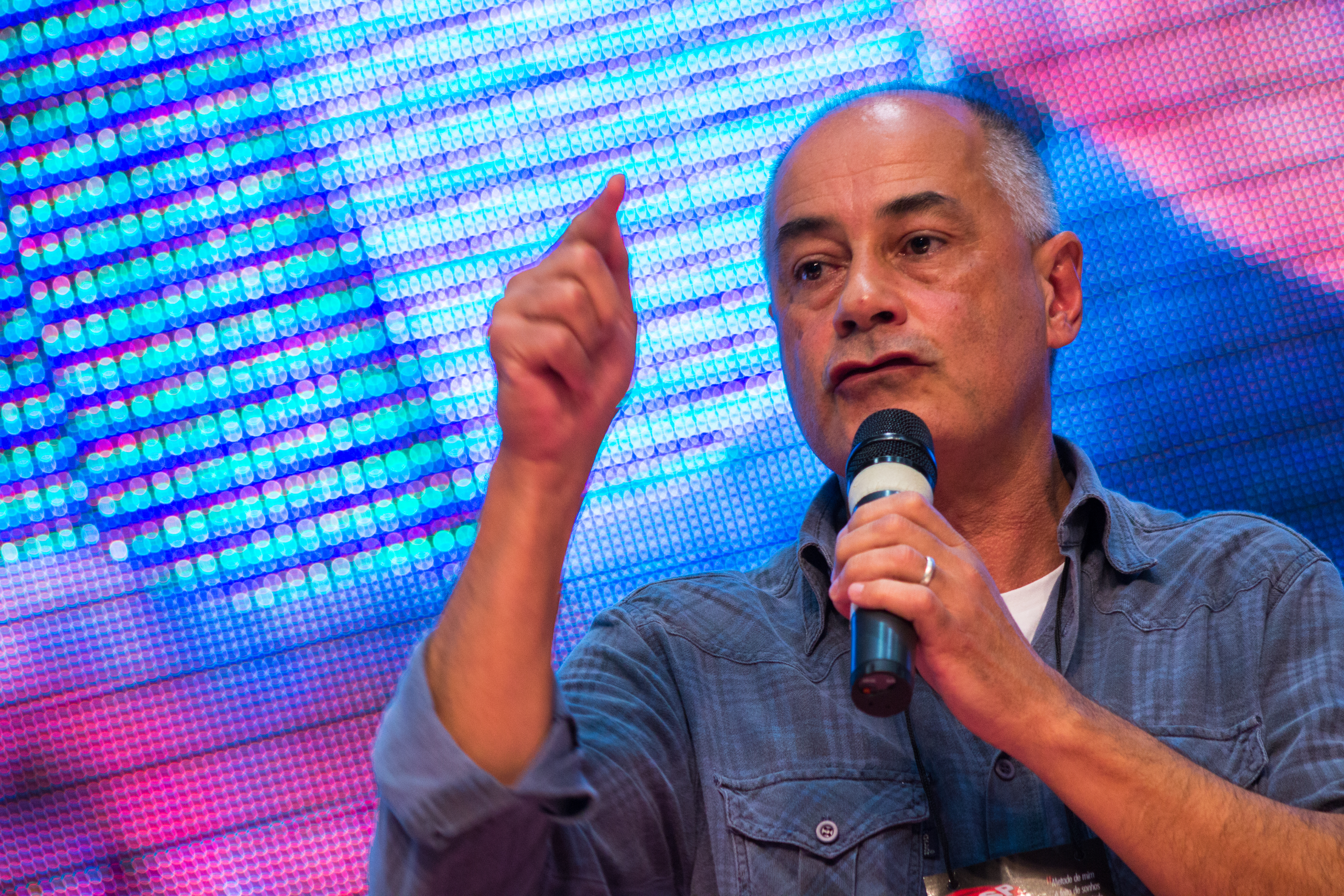
- Almeida in 2015

National President of United Socialist Workers' Party (PSTU)
- Incumbent
- Assumed office 30 September 1993
- Preceded by: Created office

Personal details
- Born: José Maria de Almeida; 2 October 1957 (age 68) Santa Albertina, SP, Brazil
- Party: PSTU (1993–present); PT (1980–1993)
- Occupation: Metallurgic

José Maria de Almeida (born 2 October 1957), often known as Zé Maria, is a Brazilian politician and the leader of the United Socialist Workers' Party (PSTU).

Almeida was the party's candidate for President of Brazil in the 1998, 2002, 2010, and 2014 elections.

Party political offices
New political party	National President of United Socialist Workers' Party; 1993–present	Incumbent
New political party	United Socialist Workers' Party nominee for President of Brazil; 1998, 2002, 2010, 2014	Succeeded by Vera Lúcia Salgado
