= Sérgio Guerra =

Brazilian politician and economist

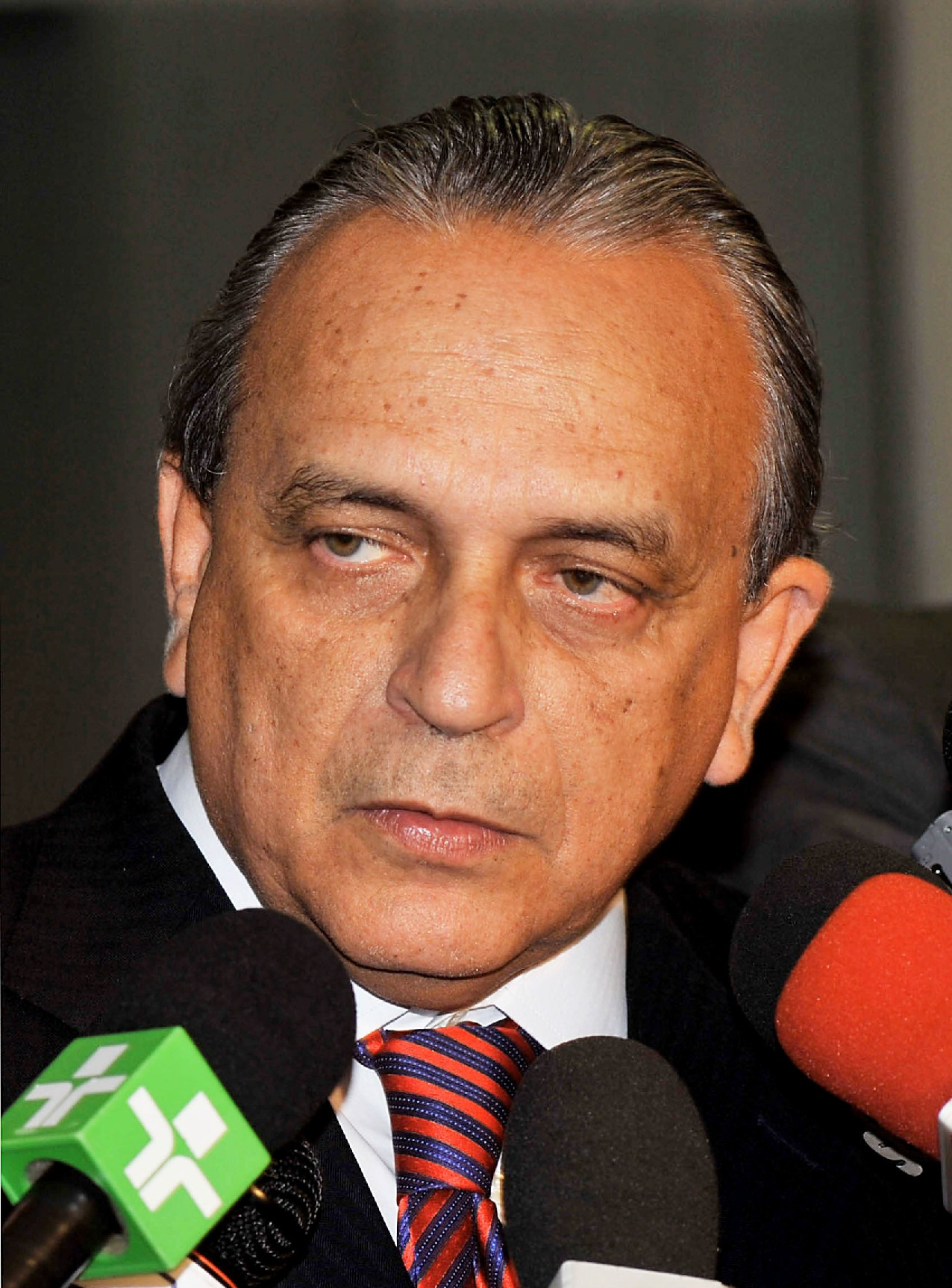
Guerra in 2009

Severino Sérgio Estelita Guerra (9 November 1947 – 6 March 2014) was a Brazilian economist and politician. His last political positions in public life were as the national president of the PSDB. He served as deputy senator for Pernambuco.

Guerra died on 6 March 2014 from lung cancer in Rio de Janeiro, Brazil, aged 66.
