= Iris de Araújo =

Brazilian politician (1943–2023)

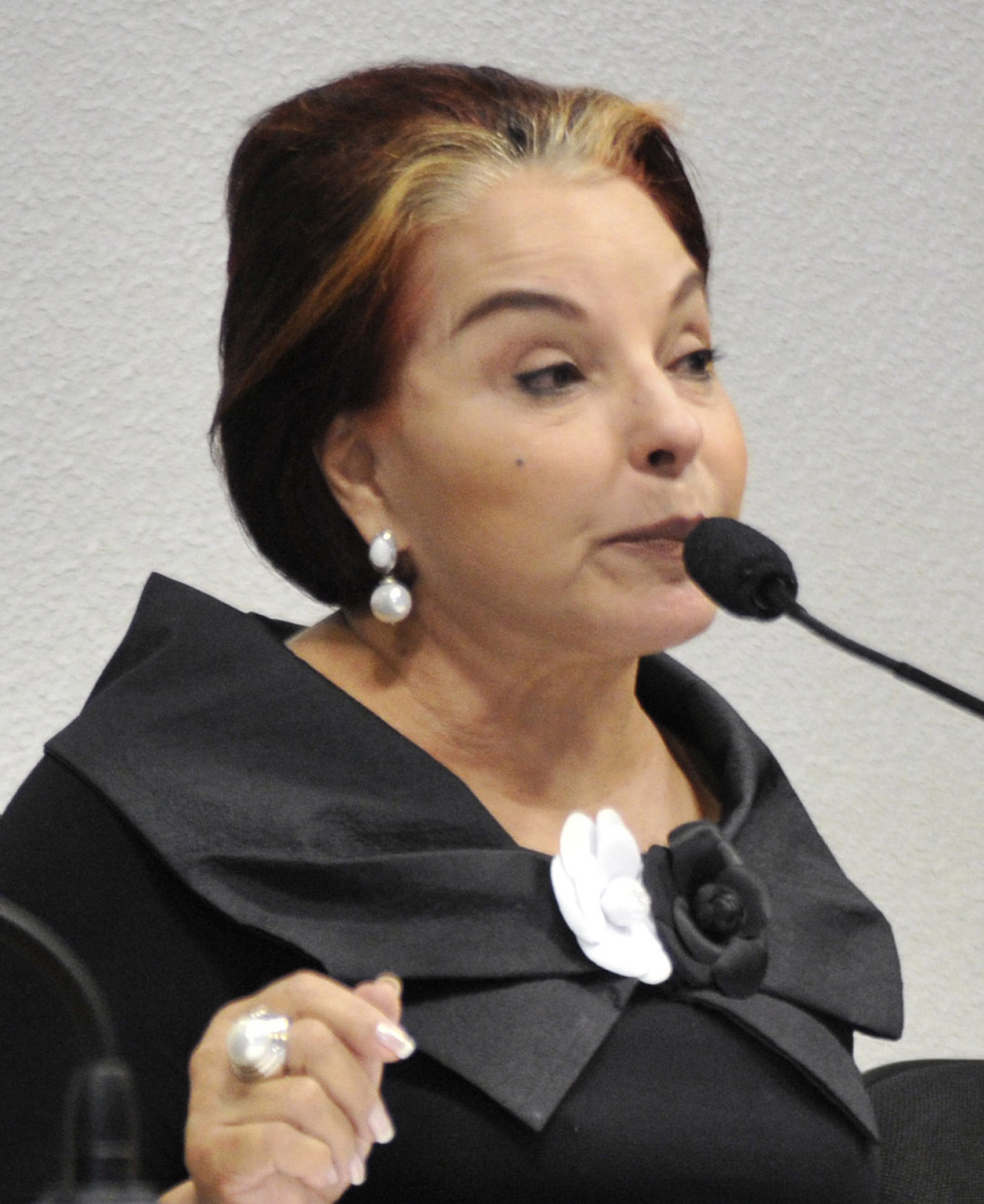
- De Araújo in 2012

First Lady of Goiás
- In office 15 March 1991 – 2 April 1994
- Governor: Iris Rezende
- Preceded by: Sônia Santillo
- Succeeded by: Laci de Resende
- In office 15 March 1983 – 13 February 1986
- Governor: Iris Rezende
- Preceded by: Maria Valadão
- Succeeded by: Lídia Quinan

Member of the Chamber of Deputies of Brazil
- In office 1 February 2007 – 31 January 2015

Personal details
- Born: Iris de Araújo Rezende Machado; 7 May 1943 Três Lagoas, Brazil
- Died: 21 February 2023 (aged 79) Goiânia, Brazil
- Party: MDB

Iris de Araújo Rezende Machado (7 May 1943 – 21 February 2023) was a Brazilian politician. A member of the Brazilian Democratic Movement, she served in the Chamber of Deputies from 2007 to 2015.

De Araújo died in Goiânia on 21 February 2023, at the age of 79.
