= Banco Cruzeiro do Sul =

Bank of Brazil

Banco Cruzeiro do Sul S.A.
- Type: Sociedade Anônima
- Industry: Financial
- Founded: (1993)
- Headquarters: São Paulo, Brazil
- Key people: Luis Octavio A.L. Indio da Costa, (Chairman & CEO)
- Products: Loan, Financing
- Revenue: ▼US$ 251.2 Million (2010)
- Net income: ▼ - US$ 37.1 Million (2010)
- Total assets: ▲US$ 7.1 Billion (2011)
- Number of employees: 3,666
- Website: www.bcsul.com.br

Banco Cruzeiro do Sul (lit. 'Southern Cross Bank') was a Brazil-based bank mainly engaged in the consumer financing segment. It was declared bankrupt on August 11, 2015.

It offered credit, investment, brokerage and consulting services, as well as a range of financial products. It also offered public bond market intermediation and loans. The bank's products were distributed in Brazil through a network of banking correspondents which included more than 360 small and midsized companies.

The bank was headquartered in São Paulo and was owned by the Indio da Costa family, prior to being liquidated by the Central Bank. Administration was taken over by the FGC (Credit Granting Fund) for 180 days in 2012, while investigations occurred over a balance of negative 150 million reais, caused by a false declaration of funds.
