= Banco Nossa Caixa =

Nossa Caixa
- Trade name: Banco Nossa Caixa S.A.
- Company type: Public company
- Founded: 30 December 1916 in São Paulo, Brazil
- Defunct: 30 November 2009
- Fate: Acquired by Banco do Brasil
- Successor: Banco do Brasil
- Headquarters: São Paulo, Brazil
- Area served: Whole of São Paulo state
- Key people: Ricardo José da Costa Flores (CEO)
- Products: Bank services
- Revenue: ▲ R$ 4.8 billion (2008)
- Net income: ▲ R$ 405 million (2008)
- Total assets: ▲ R$ 40.7 billion (2009)
- Number of employees: 15,000 (2008)
- Parent: São Paulo State Government
- Website: www.nossacaixa.com.br

Banco Nossa Caixa was a Brazilian bank founded on September 7, 1971. On May 23, 2008, their shares rose to 43 percent. Banco do Brasil, however, slowly dropped due to the rise of Banco Nossa Caixa, making it the second largest.
