= Luis Tibé =

Brazilian politician (born 1971)

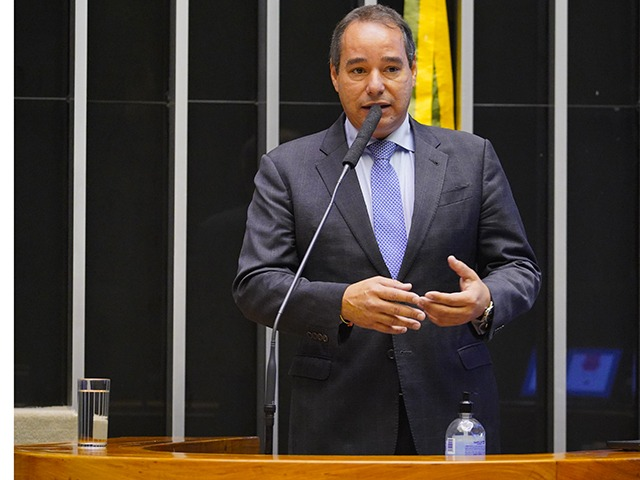
- Tibé in 2021

Member of the Chamber of Deputies
- Incumbent
- Assumed office 1 February 2011
- Constituency: Minas Gerais

Personal details
- Born: 23 July 1971 (age 54)
- Party: Avante (since 2002)

Luis Henrique de Oliveira Resende, better known as Luis Tibé (born 23 July 1971), is a Brazilian politician serving as a member of the Chamber of Deputies since 2011. He has served as president of Avante since 2006.
