= Plínio de Arruda Sampaio =

Brazilian politician

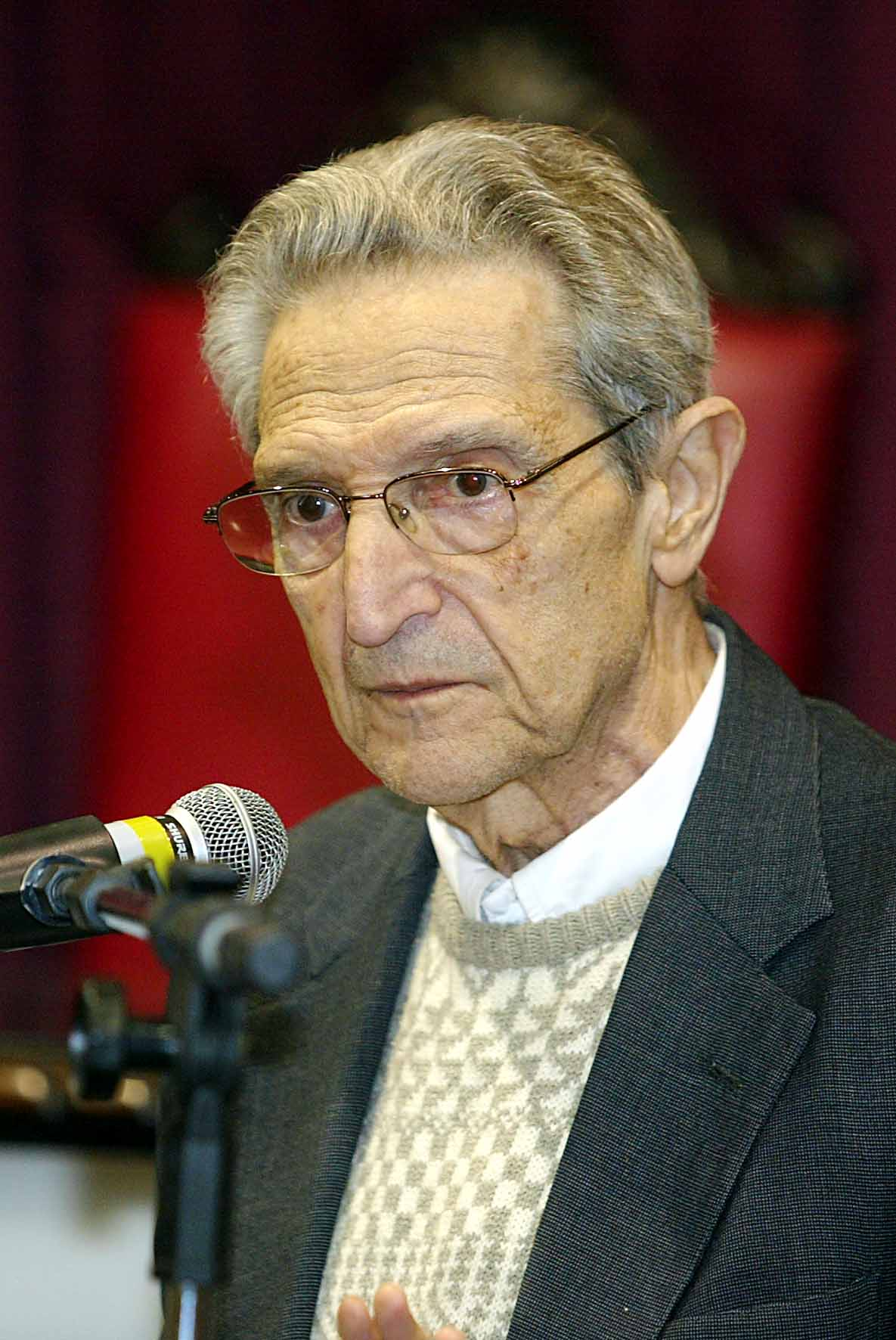

Member of the Chamber of Deputies
- In office 6 August 1985 – 13 September 1990
- Constituency: São Paulo
- In office 2 February 1963 – 10 April 1964
- Constituency: São Paulo

Personal details
- Born: Plínio Soares de Arruda Sampaio; 26 July 1930 São Paulo, São Paulo, Brazil
- Died: 8 July 2014 (aged 83) São Paulo, São Paulo, Brazil
- Cause of death: Bone cancer
- Resting place: Araçá Cemitery, São Paulo, São Paulo, Brazil; 23.5534291°S 46.6682753°W
- Party: PSOL (2005–2014); PT (1980–2005); MDB (1976–1980); PDC (1950–1965)
- Spouse: Marietta Ribeiro de Azevedo (m. 1955)
- Children: 6
- Parents: João Batista de Arruda Sampaio (father); Maria Aparecida Soares de Arruda Sampaio (mother)
- Occupation: Public prosecutor, teacher

Plínio Soares de Arruda Sampaio (26 July 1930 – 8 July 2014) was a Brazilian intellectual and political activist, who was affiliated with the Partido Socialismo e Liberdade (PSOL). He ran as a candidate for the presidency of the Federative Republic of Brazil in 2010.

A graduate of University of São Paulo School of Law in the class of 1954, he was president of the Catholic University Youth and was an active member of Popular Action.

He had been a prosecutor, deputy in the 1988 Constituent Assembly and chaired the Brazilian Association for Land Reform (ABRA), an institution that fights for land reform in Brazil. He also directed the weekly newspaper Correio da Cidadania.

== Beginning of public life ==
Arruda Sampaio was born in São Paulo. He entered public life when Carvalho Pinto was the governor of the state of São Paulo (1959–1963). At this time, he was appointed as the vice director of the Civil State House. In 1959, a year after the election of Carvalho Pinto, Arruda Sampaio became coordinator of the government's action plan, a position he held until 1962.

He was also secretary of legal affairs, and between 1961 and 1962 he worked for the city of São Paulo as secretary of interior and justice affairs. In 1962, he was elected congressman by the Christian Democratic Party and became a member of the committee on economics, agriculture and law enforcement and the committee on social legislation in the Brazilian chamber of deputies.

At this point, he created a special committee for land reform and proposed a model of reform that aroused the indignation of the country's powerful landlords. After the 1964 Brazilian coup d'état he was one of the first 100 Brazilians to be deprived of their political rights for ten years by the military dictatorship during the first ten days of the new regime.

== Exile and the Brazilian Democratic Movement ==
Arruda Sampaio was exiled to Chile, where he lived for six years, working at the FAO. In 1970, he moved to the United States, where he worked at the FAO and at the IDB in Washington, before beginning a master's degree in agricultural economics at Cornell University.

Returning to Brazil in 1976, he began teaching at the Getulio Vargas Foundation, where he founded the Center for Contemporary Cultural Studies (Cedec) and engaged in the campaign to end the military regime and the amnesty of politicians who had been expelled from political life.

At this time, along with other intellectuals, he the leftist party, the Brazilian Democratic Movement (MDB), one of two political parties permitted by the militaries. Alongside Almino Affonso, Francisco Weffort and Fernando Henrique Cardoso, the party nurtured important leaders like Marcos Freire and Jarbas Vasconcelos. In parallel, Arruda Sampaio, Affonso and Weffort launched the candidacy of Cardoso for the Brazilian Senate.

The agreement between them was to build a new left-of-centre party if Cardoso won more than one million votes (he received 1.6 million votes). The party already had a platform and would be called the People's Democratic Socialist Party (PSD).

According to Arruda Sampaio, the new party would be democratic and mass-based popular program and socialist, organized in clusters. But the idea of creating a new party was aborted by Cardoso's change of plans. After being elected senator in 1978, he stated that the strengthening of the MDB party was a priority, despite the promise made to Arruda Sampaio, Affonso and Weffort to build a new party. Arruda Sampaio, perplexed by the reversal, broke from the MDB.

== Foundation and trajectory in the Workers' Party (1980–2005) ==
Disappointed with the attitude of Cardoso, Arruda and Weffort entered the Workers' Party (PT) at its foundation, in 1980. Arruda was the author of the rules of the party and one of the creators of its core base.

In 1982 he ran for congress for São Paulo and lost, but later he came to occupy the seat of Eduardo Suplicy, who resigned to run for mayor of São Paulo. In 1986, Arruda Sampaio was elected deputy of the constituent, with 63,899 votes, was the second most popular deputy of the PT (after Luiz Inácio Lula da Silva) and the 27th most popular in São Paulo.

As a member of the constituent assembly, he became widely known for proposing and defending a model of constitutional reform which aimed to wipe out the plantations, and also became the only PT deputy to chair a working committee. During the constituent assembly, Arruda was a member of the drafting committee, the committee of systematization, the committee on state institutions, and the subcommittee on cities and regions which he presided.

He was also deputy leader of the PT in 1987, and replaced Lula da Silva in the party leadership in 1988. At this same year he lost to Luiza Erundina the PT nomination for the São Paulo mayor election. Erundina went on to win the first major election for the PT.

In 1990 he ran for governor of São Paulo, being defeated by the state secretary of public safety Luiz Antonio Fleury Filho, candidate for the PMDB, which had the support of the sitting governor Orestes Quércia.

== PSOL and presidencial candidature ==
After leaving the Workers Party, in which he was a founding member and historic leader, Arruda Sampaio joined the PSOL. He did not agree with the political direction of the PT at the time, quitting the party in 2005.

In 2006 Arruda Sampaio was PSOL candidate for the governorship of São Paulo. Defending the struggle for socialism, the program differed from the popular-democratic direction of the PSOL majority, represented by Heloísa Helena, who was then the PSOL presidential candidate.

During the Second Congress of the PSOL, the state deputy Raul Marcelo launched the pre-candidacy of Arruda Sampaio to the presidency. His purpose was to build a program that served to counter the effects of the economic crisis on workers, and the unity of the socialist left against capital.

== Death ==
On July 8, 2014, Arruda Sampaio died at the Hospital Sírio-Libanês (Syrian-Lebanese Hospital) in São Paulo, victim of a bone cancer which he fought against for over a month. He was survived by six children, including Plínio de Arruda Sampaio Jr.

Chamber of Deputies (Brazil)
Preceded by Luiz Inácio Lula da Silva	Leader of the Workers' Party in the Chamber of Deputies; 1988–1990	Succeeded by Gumercindo Milhomem
Party political offices
Preceded by Heloísa Helena	PSOL nominee for President of Brazil; 2010	Succeeded by Luciana Genro
