= Heloísa Helena (politician) =

Brazilian politician

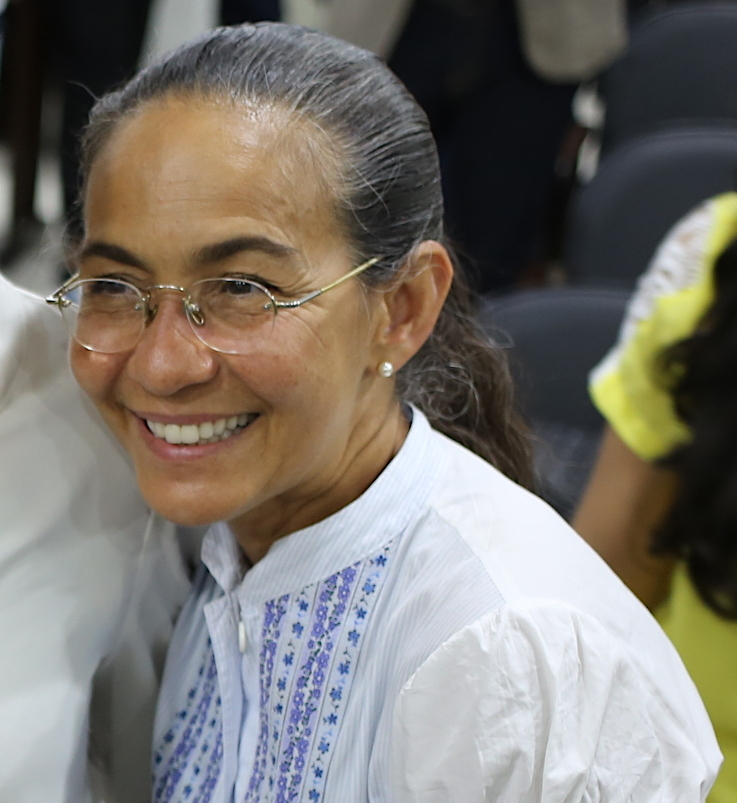
- Heloísa Helena in December 2016

Federal Deputy
- Incumbent
- Assumed office 16 December 2025
- Constituency: Rio de Janeiro

Councillor of Maceió
- In office 1 January 2009 – 1 January 2017
- Constituency: At-large

Senator for Alagoas
- In office 1 February 1999 – 1 February 2007

State Deputy of Alagoas
- In office 1 January 1995 – 1 January 1999
- Constituency: At-large

Vice Mayor of Maceió
- In office 1 January 1993 – 1 January 1995
- Mayor: Ronaldo Lessa
- Preceded by: João Sampaio
- Succeeded by: Petrúcio Bandeira

Personal details
- Born: Heloísa Helena Lima de Moraes Carvalho; 6 June 1962 (age 64) Pão de Açúcar, Alagoas, Brazil
- Party: REDE (2015–present)
- Other political affiliations: PT (1990–2004); PSOL (2004–2015)
- Occupation: Nurse

Heloísa Helena Lima de Moraes Carvalho (Portuguese pronunciation: [eloˈizɐ eˈlenɐ ˈlimɐ dʒi moˈɾajs kaʁˈvaʎu]; born 6 June 1962 in Pão de Açúcar, Alagoas) is a Brazilian nurse, schoolteacher, and politician, member of the political party Rede Sustentabilidade. She is the Brazilian woman to have received the third highest voting in a presidential race, ranking behind Marina Silva and Dilma Rousseff in 2010.

In 1998, she was elected Senator for Alagoas. Then a member of the Workers' Party, but in 2003 was expelled from the party. The following year, she was one of the founding members of the Socialism and Liberty Party. In 2013, she helped found the Rede Sustentabilidade Party.

In March 2022 she was amongst 151 international feminists signing Feminist Resistance Against War: A Manifesto, in solidarity with the Russian Feminist Anti-War Resistance. (Note: This manifesto was criticized by both Ukrainian feminists and members of the Feminist Anti-War Resistance themselves.)

== Notes ==
Political offices
Preceded by João Sampaio	Vice Mayor of Maceió; 1993–1995	Vacant Title next held by Petrúcio Bandeira
Party political offices
New political party	National President of PSOL; 2004–2010	Succeeded by Afrânio Boppré
New political party	PSOL nominee for President of Brazil; 2006	Succeeded by Plínio de Arruda Sampaio
