= Presidency of Ernesto Geisel =

Brazilian governmental presidency (1974–1979)

- Official portrait, c. 1974
- Presidency of Ernesto Geisel; 15 March 1974 – 15 March 1979
- Vice President: Adalberto Pereira dos Santos
- Party: ARENA
- Election: 1974

General Ernesto Geisel's tenure as the 29th president of Brazil began with his inauguration on 15 March 1974 and ended on 15 March 1978 when General João Figueiredo took office.

Geisel was the fourth president of Brazil's military dictatorship. During his government, the country's process of re-democratization began, Guanabara was annexed to Rio de Janeiro, the state of Mato Grosso was divided into Mato Grosso do Sul and the Brazilian Miracle and Institutional Act Number Five were abolished.

The administration of Geisel was marked by growth of 31.88% in GDP (an average of 6.37%) and 19.23% in per capita income (an average of 3.84%). However, growth slowed after the 1973 Oil Crisis. Geisel took office with inflation at 15.54% and handed over at 40.81%.

== The president ==
Ernesto Geisel began his career in 1921 as a student at the Military College in Porto Alegre and reached his most important political positions during the 1964 military regime as head of the Military Cabinet in the Castelo Branco government and minister of the Superior Military Court in the Costa e Silva administration. He was president of Petrobrás when he was nominated by President Médici as a candidate to succeed him on 18 June 1973.

A month later, he resigned from Petrobrás and was endorsed as a presidential candidate at ARENA's national convention on 14 September; his vice-presidential partner was General Adalberto Pereira dos Santos. On 15 January 1974, they beat the MDB team formed by Ulysses Guimarães and Barbosa Lima Sobrinho by a score of 400 votes to 76 in the first election held by an Electoral College. Geisel was sworn in at a solemn session of the National Congress chaired by Senator Paulo Torres (ARENA-RJ). He followed the moderate line of the armed forces, as he saw the military regime as a transitional measure to ensure liberalism in the country. (Note: Federal deputies José Maria Alkmin, Oscar Pedroso Horta and Stélio Maroja were absent from the vote for health reasons, while Fernando Gama, Jerônimo Santana and Nadyr Rossetti did not vote for the MDB candidates.) (Note: The choices of Castelo Branco, Costa e Silva and Emílio Médici were made by the National Congress, the last two already under bipartisanship and without the participation of the MDB.)

== Ministers and assistants ==
=== Ministers of State ===
Ministry	Responsible	Period
Ministry of Justice	Armando Ribeiro Falcão	15 March 1974 to 15 March 1979
Ministry of the Navy	Geraldo Azevedo Henning	15 March 1974 to 15 March 1979
Ministry of the Army	Vicente de Paulo Dale Coutinho	15 March 1974 to 27 May 1974
Ministry of the Army	Sílvio Couto Coelho da Frota	28 May 1974 to 12 October 1977
Ministry of the Army	Fernando Belfort Bethlem	12 October 1977 to 15 March 1979
Ministry of Foreign Affairs	Antônio Francisco Azeredo da Silveira	15 March 1974 to 15 March 1979
Ministry of Finance	Mário Henrique Simonsen	15 March 1974 to 15 March 1979
Ministry of Transportation	Dirceu Araújo Nogueira	15 March 1974 to 15 March 1979
Ministry of Agriculture	Alysson Paulinelli	15 March 1974 to 15 March 1979
Ministry of Education and Culture	Ney Amintas de Barros Braga	15 March 1974 to 15 March 1979
Ministry of Labour and Social Security	Arnaldo da Costa Prieto	15 March 1974 to 2 May 1974
Ministry of Labour	Arnaldo da Costa Prieto	2 May 1974 to 15 March 1979
Ministry of Aeronautics	Joelmir Campos de Araripe Macedo	15 March 1974 to 15 March 1979
Ministry of Health	Paulo de Almeida Machado	15 March 1974 to 15 March 1979
Ministry of Industry and Trade	Severo Fagundes Gomes	15 March 1974 to 8 February 1977
Ministry of Industry and Trade	ngelo Calmon de Sá	9 February 1977 to 15 March 1979
Ministry of Mines and Energy	Shigeaki Ueki	15 March 1974 to 15 March 1979
Ministry of Planning and General Coordination	João Paulo dos Reis Veloso	15 March 1974 to 15 March 1979
Ministry of the Interior	Maurício Rangel Reis	15 March 1974 to 15 March 1979
Ministry of Communications	Euclides Quandt de Oliveira	15 March 1974 to 15 March 1979
Ministry of Welfare and Social Assistance	Arnaldo da Costa Prieto	2 May 1974 to 4 July 1974 (cumulatively)
Ministry of Welfare and Social Assistance	Luís Gonzaga do Nascimento e Silva	4 July 1974 to 15 March 1979

=== Advisory bodies ===
Ministry	Responsible	Period
Military Office	Hugo de Andrade Abreu	15 March 1974 to 6 January 1978 (Note: As of 2 May 1974, the holder of the post was granted the status of Minister of State.)
Military Office	Gustavo Morais Rego Reis	6 January 1978 to 15 March 1979
Civil Cabinet	Golbery do Couto e Silva	15 March 1974 to 15 March 1979
National Information Service	João Batista de Oliveira Figueiredo	15 March 1974 to 14 June 1978
Armed Forces General Staff	Humberto de Sousa Melo	15 March 1974 to 27 September 1974
Armed Forces General Staff	Antônio Jorge Correia	4 October 1974 to 3 August 1976
Armed Forces General Staff	Moacir Barcelos Potiguara	5 August 1976 to 27 October 1977
Armed Forces General Staff	Tácito Teófilo Gaspar de Oliveira	27 October 1977 to 19 December 1978
Armed Forces General Staff	José Maria de Andrada Serpa	20 December 1978 to 15 March 1979

== Political actions ==
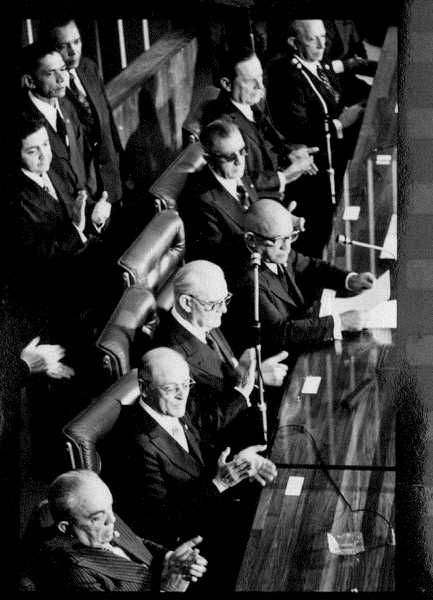
Inauguration of Geisel and his vice-president Adalberto Pereira dos Santos on 15 March 1974

Geisel assumed office after promising a "slow, gradual and secure" political opening in order to meet the demands of organized civil society without interrupting the regime. During his administration, there were fewer complaints about the death, torture and disappearance of political prisoners and confrontation with the hardline, a group opposed to the government's directives. Institutional Act Number Five was used to decree federal intervention in Rio Branco in 1975 after the MDB councillors refused to ratify the mayoral nominee and to remove some parliamentarians from office. AI-5 was progressively replaced by "constitutional safeguards".

In the campaign for the 1974 elections, MDB candidates won sixteen of the twenty-two seats in the Federal Senate and increased their representation in the Chamber of Deputies and the Legislative Assemblies. Fearing that this would happen again, in 1978 the government sanctioned the Falcão Law, which only allowed candidates' CVs to be read out during election time on radio and television. (Note: The law, sanctioned under the number 6.339 on 1 July 1976, was named after its creator, the then Minister of Justice Armando Falcão.)

On 8 April 1977, the Pacote de Abril (English: April Package) was approved and included an increase in the presidential term from five to six years, the creation of the two-year senator, the maintenance of indirect elections for governor and an increase in the number of federal deputies in the states where the government had a majority. The measures prompted criticism from the opposition, but ensured the election of General João Figueiredo as Geisel's successor on 15 October 1978. The Institutional Act Number 5 was revoked on 31 December that year.

After the deaths of journalist Vladmir Herzog and worker Manuel Fiel Filho in the DOI-CODI, also known as DOPS, between October 1975 and January 1976, the government was forced to curb the actions of the hardliners. This culminated in the replacement of General Sylvio Frota by General Fernando Belfort Bethlem in the Ministry of the Army, as a result of criticism of the High Command of the Armed Forces and the General Command of the National Information System (SNI) for allowing infiltrators to destroy important files on the premises of regional organizations. The measure represented a victory against the "radical" sectors of the Armed Forces. The Geisel government also experienced bomb attacks on the Brazilian Press Association, the Order of Attorneys of Brazil, the Brazilian Centre for Analysis and Planning and the residence of journalist Roberto Marinho.

During the Geisel government, the states of Rio de Janeiro and Guanabara merged, the state of Mato Grosso do Sul was created and former presidents Eurico Gaspar Dutra, Ranieri Mazzilli, Juscelino Kubitschek and João Goulart died.

== Society ==
The Divorce Law was sanctioned on 26 December 1977, following the adoption of a simple majority quorum for the approval of constitutional amendments. The inclusion of divorce had been a cause defended by Nelson Carneiro for years. (Note: Originally, divorce was included in Constitutional Amendment No. 9 of 28 June 1977.)

== Economic overview ==
The Geisel government was marked by the end of the Brazilian Miracle, the 1973 Oil Crisis and an increase in both inflation and external debt. To overcome the obstacles, the government decided to draw up the Second National Development Plan and instituted the National Alcohol Programme in order to diversify the energy matrix. Construction began on the Itaipu Hydroelectric Power Plant in partnership with Paraguay and a contract with Bolivia to supply gas to Brazil was signed in 1974. The following year, a nuclear agreement was signed with the then West Germany.

Due to the rise in the cost of living and inflation, workers began to organize and protest more emphatically. As a result, the trade union movement in the Greater ABC region gained prominence and the figure of Luiz Inácio Lula da Silva was projected nationally. The repercussions of the movement led the government to ban strikes in essential sectors.

== Foreign relations ==
Brazil established diplomatic relations with China and with Eastern European countries such as Bulgaria, Hungary and Romania, and was the first nation to recognize Angola's independence. Relations with the United States were cut during the presidency of Jimmy Carter after accusations of human rights violations. Geisel strengthened diplomatic ties with China and reached a nuclear agreement with Germany.

== See also ==
- Military dictatorship in Brazil
