= Elections in Brazil =

Brazil elects on the national level a head of state – the president – and a legislature. The president is elected to a four-year term by absolute majority vote through a two-round system. The National Congress (Congresso Nacional) has two chambers. The Chamber of Deputies (Câmara dos Deputados) has 513 members, elected to a four-year term by proportional representation. The Federal Senate (Senado Federal) has 81 members, elected to an eight-year term, with elections every four years for alternatively one-third and two-thirds of the seats. Brazil has a multi-party system with a high effective number of parties and political fragmentation. Often no one party has a chance of gaining a majority alone, and so they must work with each other to form coalition governments.

== Latest election ==
=== Presidential election ===
Candidate	Running mate	Party	First round		Second round	
Candidate	Running mate	Party	Votes	%	Votes	%
Luiz Inácio Lula da Silva	Geraldo Alckmin (PSB)	Workers' Party	53,879,538	45.16	64,256,232	51.79
Flávio Bolsonaro	Alfredo Gaspar	Liberal Party	56,104,503	47.03	59,826,041	48.21
Augusto Cury	Júlio Delgado	Avante	3,448,569	2.89		
Renan Santos	Aroldo Medina	Mission Party	2,675,887	2.24		
Ronaldo Caiado	Gilberto Kassab	Social Democratic Party	2,605,148	2.18		
Romeu Zema	Eduardo Girão	New Party	326,488	0.27		
Samara Martins	Raquel Brício	Popular Unity	122,911	0.10		
Hertz Dias	Vanessa Portugal	United Socialist Workers' Party	43,103	0.04		
Clariana Barão	Fabiana Torquato	Christian Democracy	40,043	0.03		
Edmilson Costa	Cleusa Santos	Brazilian Communist Party	22,693	0.02		
Wilson Grassi	Suêd Haidar	Democrata	16,881	0.01		
Rui Costa Pimenta	Antônio Carlos	Workers' Cause Party	15,024	0.01		
Total			119,300,788	100.00	124,082,273	100.00
Valid votes			119,300,788	95.23	124,082,273	96.76
Invalid votes			3,674,249	2.93	2,723,305	2.12
Blank votes			2,300,798	1.84	1,430,496	1.12
Total votes			125,275,835	100.00	128,236,074	100.00
Registered voters/turnout			158,745,502	78.92	158,745,502	80.78
Source: Superior Electoral Court

=== Parliamentary election ===
==== Chamber of Deputies ====
Party or alliance		Votes	%	Seats	+/–
Liberal Party		25,824,755	22.69	121	+22
Brazil of Hope	Workers' Party	14,793,128	13.00	70	+1
Brazil of Hope	Green Party	1,368,491	1.20	7	+1
Brazil of Hope	Communist Party of Brazil	1,306,368	1.15	11	+5
Progressive Union	Brazil Union	7,876,904	6.92	46	–13
Progressive Union	Progressistas	7,616,758	6.69	41	–6
Social Democratic Party		9,391,321	8.25	43	+1
Republicanos		7,911,780	6.95	41	+1
Brazilian Democratic Movement		7,890,384	6.93	36	–6
Podemos		5,887,427	5.17	27	+9 (Note: Compared to the combined results of Podemos and the Social Christian Party in 2022. The Social Christian Party merged into Podemos in 2023.)
PSOL REDE	Socialism and Liberty Party	5,312,161	4.67	14	+2
PSOL REDE	Sustainability Network	264,181	0.23	1	–1
Brazilian Socialist Party		5,007,692	4.40	15	+1
PSDB Cidadania	Brazilian Social Democracy Party	2,742,544	2.41	11	–2
PSDB Cidadania	Cidadania	291,324	0.26	0	–5
New Party		2,914,364	2.56	10	+7
Solidary Renewal	Democratic Renewal Party	1,203,659	1.06	5	0 (Note: Compared to the combined results of the Brazilian Labour Party and Patriot in 2022. The two parties merged to form the Democratic Renewal Party in 2022.)
Solidary Renewal	Solidarity	1,049,014	0.92	2	–2
Democratic Labour Party		1,868,424	1.64	6	–11
Avante		1,807,942	1.59	5	–2
Mission Party		1,223,569	1.08	1	New
Christian Democracy		114,402	0.10	0	0
Popular Unity		45,431	0.04	0	0
National Mobilization		34,272	0.03	0	0
Democrat		27,195	0.02	0	0 (Note: Compared to the Brazilian Woman's Party in 2022. The party was renamed to Democrat in 2025.)
United Socialist Workers' Party		18,696	0.02	0	0
Agir		7,155	0.01	0	0
Workers' Cause Party		3,041	0.00	0	0
Brazilian Communist Party		0	0.00	0	0
Brazilian Labour Renewal Party		0	0.00	0	0
Total		113,802,382	100.00	513	0
Valid votes		113,802,382	91.40		
Invalid votes		4,264,784	3.43		
Blank votes		6,445,372	5.18		
Total votes		124,512,538	100.00		
Registered voters/turnout		158,745,502	78.44		

Popular vote
PL	22.69%
FE Brasil	15.35%
UPB	13.61%
PSD	8.25%
Republicanos	6.95%
MDB	6.93%
PODE	5.17%
PSOL REDE	4.90%
PSB	4.40%
PSDB Cidadania	2.67%
NOVO	2.56%
Solidary Renewal	1.98%
PDT	1.64%
Avante	1.59%
MISSÃO	1.08%

Parliamentary seats
PL	23.58%
FE Brasil	17.15%
UPB	16.96%
PSD	8.38%
Republicanos	7.99%
MDB	7.02%
PODE	5.26%
PSOL REDE	2.92%
PSB	2.92%
PSDB Cidadania	2.14%
NOVO	1.95%
Solidary Renewal	1.36%
PDT	1.17%
Avante	0.97%
MISSÃO	0.19%

==== Federal Senate ====
Party or alliance		Votes	%	Seats		
Party or alliance		Votes	%	Elected	Total	+/–
Liberal Party		58,307,861	28.11	19	29	+14
Brazil of Hope	Workers' Party	27,306,998	13.16	6	9	0
Brazil of Hope	Green Party	5,644	0.00	0	0	0
Brazil of Hope	Communist Party of Brazil	0	0.00	0	0	0
Brazilian Democratic Movement		11,881,617	5.73	7	8	–1
Progressive Union	Progressistas	22,082,660	10.65	3	6	–2
Progressive Union	Brazil Union	7,968,162	3.84	3	5	+2
Republicanos		8,911,223	4.30	2	6	0
Social Democratic Party		10,522,601	5.07	2	5	–9
Brazilian Socialist Party		14,804,125	7.14	3	4	–2
New Party		11,067,357	5.34	3	3	+3
PSDB Cidadania	Brazilian Social Democracy Party	2,789,626	1.34	2	2	–2
PSDB Cidadania	Cidadania	205,849	0.10	0	0	0
Podemos		3,951,521	1.91	2	2	–1
PSOL REDE	Sustainability Network	10,777,999	5.20	1	1	+1
PSOL REDE	Socialism and Liberty Party	8,028,938	3.87	0	0	0
Democratic Labour Party		5,395,434	2.60	1	1	–1
Solidary Renewal	Democratic Renewal Party	608,874	0.29	0	0	0
Solidary Renewal	Solidarity	134,992	0.07	0	0	0
Mission Party		684,138	0.33	0	0	0
National Mobilization		533,859	0.26	0	0	0
Popular Unity		431,082	0.21	0	0	0
Avante		406,723	0.20	0	0	–1
United Socialist Workers' Party		216,829	0.10	0	0	0
Christian Democracy		189,353	0.09	0	0	0
Democrata		67,585	0.03	0	0	0
Workers' Cause Party		50,478	0.02	0	0	0
Brazilian Labour Renewal Party		39,609	0.02	0	0	0
Brazilian Communist Party		33,330	0.02	0	0	0
Agir		23,881	0.01	0	0	0
Total		207,428,348	100.00	54	81	0
Registered voters/turnout		154,404,390	–			

Popular vote
PL	28.11%
UPB	14.49%
FE Brasil	13.16%
PSOL REDE	9.07%
PSB	7.14%
MDB	5.73%
NOVO	5.34%
PSD	5.07%
Republicanos	4.30%
PDT	2.60%
PODE	1.91%
PSDB Cidadania	1.44%

Parliamentary seats
PL	35.80%
UPB	13.58%
FE Brasil	11.11%
MDB	9.88%
Republicanos	7.41%
PSD	6.17%
PSB	4.94%
NOVO	3.70%
PODE	2.47%
PSDB Cidadania	2.47%
PDT	1.23%
PSOL REDE	1.23%

== Schedule ==
=== Election ===
Basic rotation of Brazilian general elections
Year	2026	2027	2028	2029	2030
Type	Presidential year	Off-year	Local year	Off-year	Presidential year
President	Yes	No			Yes
Senate	54 seats	No			27 seats
Chamber	All 513 seats	No			All 531 seats
Governor	All 27 federative units	No			All 27 federative units
Legislative Assemblies	All 27 federative units	No			All 27 federative units
Mayor	No		All 5,568 municipalities	No	
Municipal Chambers	No		All 5,568 municipalities	No	

=== Inauguration ===
Position	2027	2028	2029	2030	2031	2032	2033	2034	2035
Type	Presidential (January); National Congress (February); Gubernatorial (January); States and Federal District Parliaments (January)	None	Mayors (January); City Councils (January)	None	Presidential (January); National Congress (February); Gubernatorial (January); States and Federal District Parliaments (January)	None	Mayors (January); City Councils (January)	None	Presidential (January); National Congress (February); Gubernatorial (January); States and Federal District Parliaments (January)
President and vice president	5 January	None			5 January	None			5 January
National Congress	1 February	None			1 February	None			1 February
States, cities and municipalities	1 January (state parliaments); 6 January (Governors)	None	1 January	None	1 January (state parliaments); 6 January (Governors)	None	1 January	None	1 January (state parliaments); 6 January (Governors)

== Electoral systems ==
A presidential candidate in Brazil needs to gain fifty per cent plus one of votes to be named as winner. A second-round runoff is mandated if no candidate receives fifty per cent plus one of votes.

Deputies are elected to the Chamber of Deputies using a form of party-list proportional representation known as the open list. Seats are distributed in 27 multi-member constituencies based on the Federation Units (26 States and the Federal District), ranging from 8 to 70 seats. Seats are allocated through the D'Hondt method.

Senators are elected to the Federal Senate with a plurality of the vote in a first-past-the-post system, which is not proportional. Three senators are elected for each state and for the Federal District.

In lower levels of government, the state legislative assemblies and city councils are elected using an open list proportional representation system. Seats are allocated using a version of the D'Hondt method where only parties who receive at least V/n votes (where V is the total number of votes cast and n is the total number of seats to be filled) may win seats in the legislature.

Voting in Brazil is compulsory for all literate citizens over 18 and under 70, and optional for citizens who are aged 16 and 17, older than 70 or illiterate. Brazil introduced compulsory voting into its Electoral Code in 1932 and lowered the voting age from 18 to 16 in the 1988 constitution. The 1988 constitution also granted voluntary suffrage to the illiterate citizens of Brazil.

== Brazilian voting machines ==
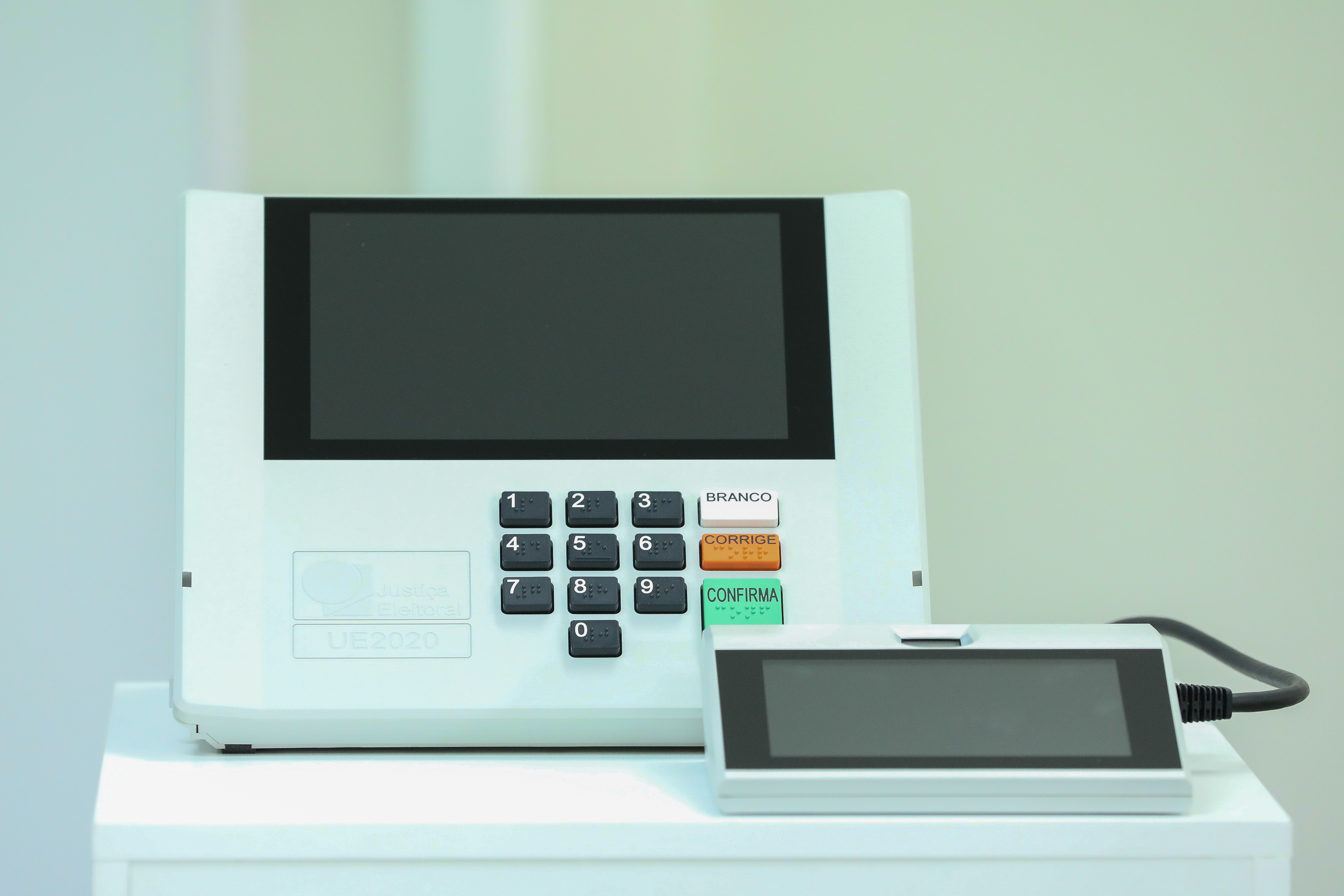
Brazilian voting machine, 2020

Electronic voting in Brazil was first deployed in 1996, in pilot use in dozens of municipalities including in the state of Santa Catarina, and was progressively expanded nationwide. The system is administered by the Electoral Justice (Justiça Eleitoral), headed by the Superior Electoral Court (Tribunal Superior Eleitoral, TSE) and the Regional Electoral Courts (Tribunais Regionais Eleitorais, TREs), which are responsible for voter registration, biometric identification, vote collection, result tabulation, transmission and consolidation of results, and formal certification of the outcome. The electronic voting machine used at polling places (urna eletrônica) is just one component of this broader infrastructure. Its design emphasizes operational simplicity for voters — often compared to the usability of a public phone booth, and it functions as a dedicated terminal that records each ballot locally, encrypts and stores the vote, and produces a digital tally at the end of the day. As of 2023, Brazil is the only country in the world to conduct its elections entirely through electronic voting.

== Presidential elections by party ==
Current parties
Party	Acronym	Election	Presidential candidate	Vice presidential candidate	Colligation	Results
Act	AGIR (previously PTC)	2026	-	-	-	-
Act	AGIR (previously PTC)	2022	Luiz Inácio Lula da Silva (PT)	Geraldo Alckmin (PSB)	Brazil of Hope Federation (PT, PCdoB, PV), PSB, AGIR, Avante, PSOL-Rede Federation (PSOL, Rede), Solidariedade, PROS	Elected ✓
Act	AGIR (previously PTC)	2018	Álvaro Dias (PODE)	Paulo Rabelo de Castro (PSC)	PODE, PSC, PTC, PRP	Lost ✗
Act	AGIR (previously PTC)	2014	Aécio Neves (PSDB)	Aloysio Nunes (PSDB)	PSDB, PTC, PTdoB, DEM, Patriota, PMN, PTN, PTB, Solidariedade	Lost ✗
Act	AGIR (previously PTC)	2010	Dilma Rousseff (PT)	Michel Temer (PMDB)	PT, PMDB, PTC, PCdoB, PDT, PR, PTN, PSB, PSC, PRB	Elected ✓
Act	AGIR (previously PTC)	2002	Anthony Garotinho (PSB)	José Antônio Figueiredo (PSB)	PSB, PTC, PGT	Lost ✗
Act	AGIR (previously PTC)	1994	Carlos Antônio Gomes (PTC)	Dilton Carlos Salomoni (PTC)	-	Lost ✗
Act	AGIR (previously PTC)	1989	Fernando Collor de Mello (PTC)	Itamar Franco (PTC)	PTC, PSC, PST, PTR	Elected ✓
Brazilian Communist Party	PCB	2026	Edmilson Costa (PCB)	Cleusa Santos (PCB)	-	Lost ✗
Brazilian Communist Party	PCB	2022	Sofia Manzano (PCB)	Antonio Alves da Silva (PCB)	-	Lost ✗
Brazilian Communist Party	PCB	2018	Guilherme Boulos (PSOL)	Sônia Guajajara (PSOL)	PSOL, PCB	Lost ✗
Brazilian Communist Party	PCB	2014	Mauro Iasi (PCB)	Sofia Manzano (PCB)	-	Lost ✗
Brazilian Communist Party	PCB	2010	Ivan Pinheiro (PCB)	Edmilson Costa (PCB)	-	Lost ✗
Brazilian Communist Party	PCB	2006	Heloísa Helena (PSOL)	César Benjamin (PSOL)	PSOL, PCB, PSTU	Lost ✗
Brazilian Communist Party	PCB	2002	Luiz Inácio Lula da Silva (PT)	José Alencar (PL)	PT, PL, PCB, PCdoB, PMN	Elected ✓
Brazilian Communist Party	PCB	1998	Luiz Inácio Lula da Silva (PT)	Leonel Brizola (PDT)	PT, PDT, PCB, PCdoB, PSB	Lost ✗
Brazilian Communist Party	PCB	1994	Luiz Inácio Lula da Silva (PT)	Aloizio Mercadante (PT)	PT, Cidadania, PCB, PCdoB, PSB, PSTU, PV	Lost ✗
Brazilian Communist Party	PCB	1989	Roberto Freire (PCB)	Sérgio Arouca (PCB)	-	Lost ✗
Brazilian Communist Party	PCB	1985	-	-	-	-
Brazilian Communist Party	PCB	1978	-	-	-	-
Brazilian Communist Party	PCB	1974	-	-	-	-
Brazilian Communist Party	PCB	1969	-	-	-	-
Brazilian Communist Party	PCB	1966	-	-	-	-
Brazilian Communist Party	PCB	1964	-	-	-	-
Brazilian Communist Party	PCB	1960	-	-	-	-
Brazilian Communist Party	PCB	1955	-	-	-	-
Brazilian Communist Party	PCB	1950	-	-	-	-
Brazilian Communist Party	PCB	1945	Iedo Fiúza (PCB)	-	-	Lost ✗
Brazilian Communist Party	PCB	1934	-	-	-	-
Brazilian Communist Party	PCB	1930	Minervino de Oliveira (PCB)	-	-	Lost ✗
Brazilian Communist Party	PCB	1930	-	Gastão Valentim (PCB)	-	Lost ✗
Brazilian Communist Party	PCB	1926	-	-	-	-
Brazilian Communist Party	PCB	1922	-	-	-	-
Brazilian Democratic Movement	MDB (previously PMDB)	2026	-	-	-	-
Brazilian Democratic Movement	MDB (previously PMDB)	2022	Simone Tebet (MDB)	Mara Gabrilli (PSDB)	MDB, Always Forward Federation (Cidadania, PSDB), PODE	Lost ✗
Brazilian Democratic Movement	MDB (previously PMDB)	2018	Henrique Meirelles (MDB)	Germano Rigotto (MDB)	MDB, PHS	Lost ✗
Brazilian Democratic Movement	MDB (previously PMDB)	2014	Dilma Rousseff (PT)	Michel Temer (PMDB)	PT, PMDB, PCdoB, PDT, PL, PP, PROS, PSD, Republicanos	Elected ✓
Brazilian Democratic Movement	MDB (previously PMDB)	2010	Dilma Rousseff (PT)	Michel Temer (PMDB)	PT, PMDB, AGIR, PCdoB, PDT, PL, PODE, PSB, PSC, Republicanos	Elected ✓
Brazilian Democratic Movement	MDB (previously PMDB)	2006	-	-	-	-
Brazilian Democratic Movement	MDB (previously PMDB)	2002	José Serra (PSDB)	Rita Camata (PMDB)	PSDB, PMDB	Lost ✗
Brazilian Democratic Movement	MDB (previously PMDB)	1998	-	-	-	-
Brazilian Democratic Movement	MDB (previously PMDB)	1994	Orestes Quércia (PMDB)	Iris de Araújo (PMDB)	PMDB, PSD, PRP	Lost ✗
Brazilian Democratic Movement	MDB (previously PMDB)	1989	Ulysses Guimarães (PMDB)	Waldir Pires (PMDB)	-	Lost ✗
Brazilian Democratic Movement	MDB (previously PMDB)	1985	Tancredo Neves (PMDB)	José Sarney (PMDB)	-	Elected ✓
Brazilian Democratic Movement	MDB (previously PMDB)	1978	Euler Bentes Monteiro (MDB)	Paulo Brossard (MDB)	-	Lost ✗
Brazilian Democratic Movement	MDB (previously PMDB)	1974	Ulysses Guimarães (MDB)	Barbosa Lima Sobrinho (MDB)		Lost ✗
Brazilian Democratic Movement	MDB (previously PMDB)	1969	-	-	-	-
Brazilian Democratic Movement	MDB (previously PMDB)	1966	-	-	-	-
Brazilian Labour Renewal Party	PRTB	2026	-	-	-	-
Brazilian Labour Renewal Party	PRTB	2022	-	-	-	-
Brazilian Labour Renewal Party	PRTB	2018	Jair Bolsonaro (PSL)	Hamilton Mourão (PRTB)	PSL, PRTB	Elected ✓
Brazilian Labour Renewal Party	PRTB	2014	Levy Fidelix (PRTB)	José Alves de Oliveira (PRTB)	-	Lost ✗
Brazilian Labour Renewal Party	PRTB	2010	Levy Fidelix (PRTB)	Luiz Eduardo Ayres Duarte (PRTB)	-	Lost ✗
Brazilian Labour Renewal Party	PRTB	2006	-	-	-	-
Brazilian Labour Renewal Party	PRTB	2002	-	-	-	-
Brazilian Labour Renewal Party	PRTB	1998	-	-	-	-
Brazilian Social Democracy Party	PSDB	2026	-	-	-	-
Brazilian Social Democracy Party	PSDB	2022	Simone Tebet (MDB)	Mara Gabrilli (PSDB)	MDB, Always Forward Federation (Cidadania, PSDB), PODE	Lost ✗
Brazilian Social Democracy Party	PSDB	2018	Geraldo Alckmin (PSDB)	Ana Amélia Lemos (PP)	PSDB, PP, Cidadania, DEM, PL, PSD, PTB, Republicanos, Solidariedade	Lost ✗
Brazilian Social Democracy Party	PSDB	2014	Aécio Neves (PSDB)	Aloysio Nunes (PSDB)	PSDB, AGIR, Avante, DEM, Patriota, PMN, PODE, PTB, Solidariedade	Lost ✗
Brazilian Social Democracy Party	PSDB	2010	José Serra (PSDB)	Indio da Costa (DEM)	PSDB, DEM, Avante, Cidadania, PMN, PTB	Lost ✗
Brazilian Social Democracy Party	PSDB	2006	Geraldo Alckmin (PSDB)	José Jorge (DEM)	PSDB, DEM	Lost ✗
Brazilian Social Democracy Party	PSDB	2002	José Serra (PSDB)	Rita Camata (PMDB)	PSDB, PMDB	Lost ✗
Brazilian Social Democracy Party	PSDB	1998	Fernando Henrique Cardoso (PSDB)	Marco Maciel (DEM)	PSDB, DEM, PP, PSD, PTB	Elected ✓
Brazilian Social Democracy Party	PSDB	1994	Fernando Henrique Cardoso (PSDB)	Marco Maciel (DEM)	PSDB, DEM, PTB	Elected ✓
Brazilian Social Democracy Party	PSDB	1989	Mário Covas (PSDB)	Almir Gabriel (PSDB)	-	Lost ✗
Brazilian Socialist Party	PSB	2026	Luiz Inácio Lula da Silva (PT)	Geraldo Alckmin (PSB)	Brazil of Hope Federation (PT, PCdoB, PV), PSB, PSOL-Rede Federation (PSOL, Rede), PDT	Elected ✓
Brazilian Socialist Party	PSB	2022	Luiz Inácio Lula da Silva (PT)	Geraldo Alckmin (PSB)	Brazil of Hope Federation (PT, PCdoB, PV), PSB, AGIR, Avante, PSOL-Rede Federation (PSOL, Rede), Solidariedade, PROS	Elected ✓
Brazilian Socialist Party	PSB	2018	-	-	-	-
Brazilian Socialist Party	PSB	2014	Marina Silva (PSB)	Beto Albuquerque (PSB)	PSB, Cidadania, PHS, PPL, PRP, PSL	Lost ✗
Brazilian Socialist Party	PSB	2010	Dilma Rousseff (PT)	Michel Temer (PMDB)	PT, PMDB, AGIR, PCdoB, PDT, PL, PODE, PSB, PSC, Republicanos	Elected ✓
Brazilian Socialist Party	PSB	2006	-	-	-	-
Brazilian Socialist Party	PSB	2002	Anthony Garotinho (PSB)	José Antônio Figueiredo (PSB)	PSB, AGIR, PGT	Lost ✗
Brazilian Socialist Party	PSB	1998	Luiz Inácio Lula da Silva (PT)	Leonel Brizola (PDT)	PT, PDT, PCB, PCdoB, PSB	Lost ✗
Brazilian Socialist Party	PSB	1994	Luiz Inácio Lula da Silva (PT)	Aloizio Mercadante (PT)	PT, Cidadania, PCB, PCdoB, PSB, PSTU, PV	Lost ✗
Brazilian Socialist Party	PSB	1989	Luiz Inácio Lula da Silva (PT)	José Paulo Bisol (PSB)	PT, PSB, PCdoB	Lost ✗
Brazilian Socialist Party	PSB	1985	-	-	-	-
Brazilian Socialist Party	PSB	1978	-	-	-	-
Brazilian Socialist Party	PSB	1974	-	-	-	-
Brazilian Socialist Party	PSB	1969	-	-	-	-
Brazilian Socialist Party	PSB	1966	-	-	-	-
Brazilian Socialist Party	PSB	1964	-	-	-	-
Brazilian Socialist Party	PSB	1960	Henrique Teixeira Lott (PSD)	-	PSD, PTB, PRT, PSB, PST	Lost ✗
Brazilian Socialist Party	PSB	1960	-	João Goulart (PTB)	PSD, PTB, PRT, PSB, PST	Elected ✓
Brazilian Socialist Party	PSB	1955	Juarez Távora (UDN)		UDN, PDC, PL, PSB	Lost ✗
Brazilian Socialist Party	PSB	1955		Milton Campos (UDN)	UDN, PDC, PL, PSB	Lost ✗
Brazilian Socialist Party	PSB	1950	João Mangabeira (PSB)	-	-	Lost ✗
Brazilian Socialist Party	PSB	1950	-	Alípio Correia Neto (PSB)	-	Lost ✗
Brazil Union	UNIÃO	2026	-	-	-	-
Brazil Union	UNIÃO	2022	Soraya Thronicke (UNIÃO)	Marcos Cintra (UNIÃO)	-	Lost ✗
Christian Democracy	DC (previously PSDC)	2026	Clariana Barão (DC)	Fabiana Torquato (DC)	-	Lost ✗
Christian Democracy	DC (previously PSDC)	2022	José Maria Eymael (DC)	João Barbosa Bravo (DC)	-	Lost ✗
Christian Democracy	DC (previously PSDC)	2018	José Maria Eymael (DC)	Hélvio Costa (DC)	-	Lost ✗
Christian Democracy	DC (previously PSDC)	2014	José Maria Eymael (DC)	Roberto Lopes (DC)	-	Lost ✗
Christian Democracy	DC (previously PSDC)	2010	José Maria Eymael (DC)	José Paulo da Silva Neto (DC)	-	Lost ✗
Christian Democracy	DC (previously PSDC)	2006	José Maria Eymael (DC)	José Paulo da Silva Neto (DC)	-	Lost ✗
Christian Democracy	DC (previously PSDC)	2002	-	-	-	-
Christian Democracy	DC (previously PSDC)	1998	José Maria Eymael (DC)	Josmar Oliveira Alderete (DC)	-	Lost ✗
Citizenship	Cidadania (previously PPS)	2026	-	-	-	-
Citizenship	Cidadania (previously PPS)	2022	Simone Tebet (MDB)	Mara Gabrilli (PSDB)	MDB, Always Forward Federation (Cidadania, PSDB), PODE	Lost ✗
Citizenship	Cidadania (previously PPS)	2018	Geraldo Alckmin (PSDB)	Ana Amélia Lemos (PP)	PSDB, PP, Cidadania, DEM, PL, PSD, PTB, Republicanos, Solidariedade	Lost ✗
Citizenship	Cidadania (previously PPS)	2014	Marina Silva (PSB)	Beto Albuquerque (PSB)	PSB, Cidadania, PHS, PPL, PRP, PSL	Lost ✗
Citizenship	Cidadania (previously PPS)	2010	José Serra (PSDB)	Indio da Costa (DEM)	PSDB, DEM, Avante, Cidadania, PMN, PTB	Lost ✗
Citizenship	Cidadania (previously PPS)	2006	-	-	-	-
Citizenship	Cidadania (previously PPS)	2002	Ciro Gomes (Cidadania)	Paulinho da Força (PTB)	Cidadania, PTB, PDT	Lost ✗
Citizenship	Cidadania (previously PPS)	1998	Ciro Gomes (Cidadania)	Roberto Freire (Cidadania)	Cidadania, PAN, PL	Lost ✗
Citizenship	Cidadania (previously PPS)	1994	Luiz Inácio Lula da Silva (PT)	Aloizio Mercadante (PT)	PT, Cidadania, PCB, PCdoB, PSB, PSTU, PV	Lost ✗
Communist Party of Brazil	PCdoB	2026	Luiz Inácio Lula da Silva (PT)	Geraldo Alckmin (PSB)	Brazil of Hope Federation (PT, PCdoB, PV), PSB, AGIR, PSOL-Rede Federation (PSOL, Rede), PDT	Elected ✓
Communist Party of Brazil	PCdoB	2022	Luiz Inácio Lula da Silva (PT)	Geraldo Alckmin (PSB)	Brazil of Hope Federation (PT, PCdoB, PV), PSB, AGIR, Avante, PSOL-Rede Federation (PSOL, Rede), Solidariedade, PROS	Elected ✓
Communist Party of Brazil	PCdoB	2018	Fernando Haddad (PT)	Manuela D'Ávila (PCdoB)	PT, PCdoB, PROS	Lost ✗
Communist Party of Brazil	PCdoB	2014	Dilma Rousseff (PT)	Michel Temer (PMDB)	PT, PMDB, PCdoB, PDT, PL, PP, PROS, PSD, Republicanos	Elected ✓
Communist Party of Brazil	PCdoB	2010	Dilma Rousseff (PT)	Michel Temer (PMDB)	PT, PMDB, AGIR, PCdoB, PDT, PL, PODE, PSB, PSC, Republicanos	Elected ✓
Communist Party of Brazil	PCdoB	2006	Luiz Inácio Lula da Silva (PT)	José Alencar (Republicanos)	PT, Republicanos, PCdoB	Elected ✓
Communist Party of Brazil	PCdoB	2002	Luiz Inácio Lula da Silva (PT)	José Alencar (PL)	PT, PL, PCB, PCdoB, PMN	Elected ✓
Communist Party of Brazil	PCdoB	1998	Luiz Inácio Lula da Silva (PT)	Leonel Brizola (PDT)	PT, PDT, PCB, PCdoB, PSB	Lost ✗
Communist Party of Brazil	PCdoB	1994	Luiz Inácio Lula da Silva (PT)	Aloizio Mercadante (PT)	PT, Cidadania, PCB, PCdoB, PSB, PSTU, PV	Lost ✗
Communist Party of Brazil	PCdoB	1989	Luiz Inácio Lula da Silva (PT)	José Paulo Bisol (PSB)	PT, PSB, PCdoB	Lost ✗
Democrat	Democrata (previously PMB)	2026	-	-	-	-
Democrat	Democrata (previously PMB)	2022	-	-	-	-
Democrat	Democrata (previously PMB)	2018	-	-	-	-
Democratic Labour Party	PDT	2026	Luiz Inácio Lula da Silva (PT)	Geraldo Alckmin (PSB)	Brazil of Hope Federation (PT, PCdoB, PV), PSB, PSOL-Rede Federation (PSOL, Rede), PDT	Elected ✓
Democratic Labour Party	PDT	2022	Ciro Gomes (PDT)	Ana Paula Matos (PDT)	PDT	Lost ✗
Democratic Labour Party	PDT	2018	Ciro Gomes (PDT)	Kátia Abreu (PDT)	PDT, Avante	Lost ✗
Democratic Labour Party	PDT	2014	Dilma Rousseff (PT)	Michel Temer (PMDB)	PT, PMDB, PCdoB, PDT, PL, PP, PROS, PSD, Republicanos	Elected ✓
Democratic Labour Party	PDT	2010	Dilma Rousseff (PT)	Michel Temer (PMDB)	PT, PMDB, AGIR, PCdoB, PDT, PL, PODE, PSB, PSC, Republicanos	Elected ✓
Democratic Labour Party	PDT	2006	Cristovam Buarque (PDT)	Jefferson Péres (PDT)	-	Lost ✗
Democratic Labour Party	PDT	2002	Ciro Gomes (Cidadania)	Paulinho da Força (PTB)	Cidadania, PTB, PDT	Lost ✗
Democratic Labour Party	PDT	1998	Luiz Inácio Lula da Silva (PT)	Leonel Brizola (PDT)	PT, PDT, PCB, PCdoB, PSB	Lost ✗
Democratic Labour Party	PDT	1994	Leonel Brizola (PDT)	Darcy Ribeiro (PDT)	PDT, PMN	Lost ✗
Democratic Labour Party	PDT	1989	Leonel Brizola (PDT)	Fernando Lyra (PDT)	-	Lost ✗
Forward	Avante (previously PTdoB)	2026	Augusto Cury (Avante)	Júlio Delgado (Avante)	Avante, Agir	Lost ✗
Forward	Avante (previously PTdoB)	2022	Luiz Inácio Lula da Silva (PT)	Geraldo Alckmin (PSB)	Brazil of Hope Federation (PT, PCdoB, PV), PSB, AGIR, Avante, PSOL-Rede Federation (PSOL, Rede), Solidariedade, PROS	Elected ✓
Forward	Avante (previously PTdoB)	2018	Ciro Gomes (PDT)	Kátia Abreu (PDT)	PDT, Avante	Lost ✗
Forward	Avante (previously PTdoB)	2014	Aécio Neves (PSDB)	Aloysio Nunes (PSDB)	PSDB, AGIR, Avante, DEM, Patriota, PMN, PODE, PTB, Solidariedade	Lost ✗
Forward	Avante (previously PTdoB)	2010	José Serra (PSDB)	Indio da Costa (DEM)	PSDB, DEM, Avante, Cidadania, PMN, PTB	Lost ✗
Forward	Avante (previously PTdoB)	2006	-	-	-	-
Forward	Avante (previously PTdoB)	2002	-	-	-	-
Forward	Avante (previously PTdoB)	1998	João de Deus (Avante)	Nanci Pilar (Avante)	-	Lost ✗
Green Party	PV	2026	Luiz Inácio Lula da Silva (PT)	Geraldo Alckmin (PSB)	Brazil of Hope Federation (PT, PCdoB, PV), PSB, PSOL-Rede Federation (PSOL, Rede), PDT	Elected ✓
Green Party	PV	2022	Luiz Inácio Lula da Silva (PT)	Geraldo Alckmin (PSB)	Brazil of Hope Federation (PT, PCdoB, PV), PSB, AGIR, Avante, PSOL-Rede Federation (PSOL, Rede), Solidariedade, PROS	Elected ✓
Green Party	PV	2018	Marina Silva (Rede)	Eduardo Jorge (PV)	Rede, PV	Lost ✗
Green Party	PV	2014	Eduardo Jorge (PV)	Célia Sacramento (PV)	-	Lost ✗
Green Party	PV	2010	Marina Silva (PV)	Guilherme Leal (PV)	-	Lost ✗
Green Party	PV	2006	-	-	-	-
Green Party	PV	2002	-	-	-	-
Green Party	PV	1998	Alfredo Sirkis (PV)	Carla Piranda Rabello (PV)	-	Lost ✗
Green Party	PV	1994	Luiz Inácio Lula da Silva (PT)	Aloizio Mercadante (PT)	PT, Cidadania, PCB, PCdoB, PSB, PSTU, PV	Lost ✗
Green Party	PV	1989	Fernando Gabeira (PV)	Mauricio Lobo de Abreu (PV)	-	Lost ✗
Liberal Party	PL	2026	Flávio Bolsonaro (PL)	Alfredo Gaspar (PL)	-	Lost ✗
Liberal Party	PL	2022	Jair Bolsonaro (PL)	Walter Braga Netto (PL)	PL, Republicanos, PP	Lost ✗
Liberal Party	PL	2018	Geraldo Alckmin (PSDB)	Ana Amélia Lemos (PP)	PSDB, PP, Cidadania, DEM, PL, PSD, PTB, Republicanos, Solidariedade	Lost ✗
Liberal Party	PL	2014	Dilma Rousseff (PT)	Michel Temer (PMDB)	PT, PMDB, PCdoB, PDT, PL, PP, PROS, PSD, Republicanos	Elected ✓
Liberal Party	PL	2010	Dilma Rousseff (PT)	Michel Temer (PMDB)	PT, PMDB, AGIR, PCdoB, PDT, PL, PODE, PSB, PSC, Republicanos	Elected ✓
National Mobilization	MOBILIZA (previously PMN)	2026	-	-	-	-
National Mobilization	MOBILIZA (previously PMN)	2022	-	-	-	-
National Mobilization	MOBILIZA (previously PMN)	2018	-	-	-	-
National Mobilization	MOBILIZA (previously PMN)	2014	Aécio Neves (PSDB)	Aloysio Nunes (PSDB)	PSDB, AGIR, Avante, DEM, Patriota, PMN, PODE, PTB, Solidariedade	Lost ✗
National Mobilization	MOBILIZA (previously PMN)	2010	José Serra (PSDB)	Indio da Costa (DEM)	PSDB, DEM, Avante, Cidadania, PMN, PTB	Lost ✗
National Mobilization	MOBILIZA (previously PMN)	2006	-	-	-	-
National Mobilization	MOBILIZA (previously PMN)	2002	Luiz Inácio Lula da Silva (PT)	José Alencar (PL)	PT, PL, PCB, PCdoB, PMN	Elected ✓
National Mobilization	MOBILIZA (previously PMN)	1998	Ivan Frota (PMN)	João Ferreira da Silva (PMN)	-	Lost ✗
National Mobilization	MOBILIZA (previously PMN)	1994	Leonel Brizola (PDT)	Darcy Ribeiro (PDT)	PDT, PMN	Lost ✗
National Mobilization	MOBILIZA (previously PMN)	1989	Celso Brant (PMN)	José Natan Emídio Neto (PMN)	-	Lost ✗
New Party	NOVO	2026	Romeu Zema (NOVO)	Eduardo Girão (NOVO)	-	Lost ✗
New Party	NOVO	2022	Luiz Felipe d'Avila (NOVO)	Tiago Mitraud (NOVO)	-	Lost ✗
New Party	NOVO	2018	João Amoêdo (NOVO)	Christian Lohbauer (NOVO)	-	Lost ✗
Progressives	PP	2026	-	-	-	-
Progressives	PP	2022	Jair Bolsonaro (PL)	Walter Braga Netto (PL)	PL, Republicanos, PP	Lost ✗
Progressives	PP	2018	Geraldo Alckmin (PSDB)	Ana Amélia Lemos (PP)	PSDB, PP, Cidadania, DEM, PL, PSD, PTB, Republicanos, Solidariedade	Lost ✗
Progressives	PP	2014	Dilma Rousseff (PT)	Michel Temer (PMDB)	PT, PMDB, PCdoB, PDT, PL, PP, PROS, PSD, Republicanos	Elected ✓
Progressives	PP	2010	-	-	-	-
Progressives	PP	2006	-	-	-	-
Progressives	PP	2002	-	-	-	-
Progressives	PP	1998	Fernando Henrique Cardoso (PSDB)	Marco Maciel (DEM)	PSDB, DEM, PP, PSD, PTB	Elected ✓
Popular Unity	UP	2026	Samara Martins (UP)	Raquel Brício (UP)	-	Lost ✗
Popular Unity	UP	2022	Léo Péricles (UP)	Samara Martins (UP)	-	Lost ✗
Republicans	Republicanos (previously PRB)	2026	-	-	-	-
Republicans	Republicanos (previously PRB)	2022	Jair Bolsonaro (PL)	Walter Braga Netto (PL)	PL, Republicanos, PP	Lost ✗
Republicans	Republicanos (previously PRB)	2018	Geraldo Alckmin (PSDB)	Ana Amélia Lemos (PP)	PSDB, PP, Cidadania, DEM, PL, PSD, PTB, Republicanos, Solidariedade	Lost ✗
Republicans	Republicanos (previously PRB)	2014	Dilma Rousseff (PT)	Michel Temer (PMDB)	PT, PMDB, PCdoB, PDT, PL, PP, PROS, PSD, Republicanos	Elected ✓
Republicans	Republicanos (previously PRB)	2010	Dilma Rousseff (PT)	Michel Temer (PMDB)	PT, PMDB, AGIR, PCdoB, PDT, PL, PODE, PSB, PSC, Republicanos	Elected ✓
Republicans	Republicanos (previously PRB)	2006	Luiz Inácio Lula da Silva (PT)	José Alencar (Republicanos)	PT, Republicanos, PCdoB	Elected ✓
Social Democratic Party	PSD	2026	Ronaldo Caiado (PSD)	Gilberto Kassab (PSD)	-	Lost ✗
Social Democratic Party	PSD	2022	-	-	-	-
Social Democratic Party	PSD	2018	Geraldo Alckmin (PSDB)	Ana Amélia Lemos (PP)	PSDB, PP, Cidadania, DEM, PL, PSD, PTB, Republicanos, Solidariedade	Lost ✗
Social Democratic Party	PSD	2014	Dilma Rousseff (PT)	Michel Temer (PMDB)	PT, PMDB, PCdoB, PDT, PL, PP, PROS, PSD, Republicanos	Elected ✓
Socialism and Liberty Party	PSOL	2026	Luiz Inácio Lula da Silva (PT)	Geraldo Alckmin (PSB)	Brazil of Hope Federation (PT, PCdoB, PV), PSB, PSOL-Rede Federation (PSOL, Rede), PDT	Elected ✓
Socialism and Liberty Party	PSOL	2022	Luiz Inácio Lula da Silva (PT)	Geraldo Alckmin (PSB)	Brazil of Hope Federation (PT, PCdoB, PV), PSB, AGIR, Avante, PSOL-Rede Federation (PSOL, Rede), Solidariedade, PROS	Elected ✓
Socialism and Liberty Party	PSOL	2018	Guilherme Boulos (PSOL)	Sônia Guajajara (PSOL)	PSOL, PCB	Lost ✗
Socialism and Liberty Party	PSOL	2014	Luciana Genro (PSOL)	Jorge Paz (PSOL)	-	Lost ✗
Socialism and Liberty Party	PSOL	2010	Plínio de Arruda Sampaio (PSOL)	Hamilton Assis (PSOL)	-	Lost ✗
Socialism and Liberty Party	PSOL	2006	Heloísa Helena (PSOL)	César Benjamin (PSOL)	PSOL, PCB, PSTU	Lost ✗
Solidarity	Solidariedade	2026	-	-	-	-
Solidarity	Solidariedade	2022	Luiz Inácio Lula da Silva (PT)	Geraldo Alckmin (PSB)	Brazil of Hope Federation (PT, PCdoB, PV), PSB, AGIR, Avante, PSOL-Rede Federation (PSOL, Rede), Solidariedade, PROS	Elected ✓
Solidarity	Solidariedade	2018	Geraldo Alckmin (PSDB)	Ana Amélia Lemos (PP)	PSDB, PP, Cidadania, DEM, PL, PSD, PTB, Republicanos, Solidariedade	Lost ✗
Solidarity	Solidariedade	2014	Aécio Neves (PSDB)	Aloysio Nunes (PSDB)	PSDB, AGIR, Avante, DEM, Patriota, PMN, PODE, PTB, Solidariedade	Lost ✗
Sustainability Network	Rede	2026	Luiz Inácio Lula da Silva (PT)	Geraldo Alckmin (PSB)	Brazil of Hope Federation (PT, PCdoB, PV), PSB, PSOL-Rede Federation (PSOL, Rede), PDT	Elected ✓
Sustainability Network	Rede	2022	Luiz Inácio Lula da Silva (PT)	Geraldo Alckmin (PSB)	Brazil of Hope Federation (PT, PCdoB, PV), PSB, AGIR, Avante, PSOL-Rede Federation (PSOL, Rede), Solidariedade, PROS	Elected ✓
Sustainability Network	Rede	2018	Marina Silva (Rede)	Eduardo Jorge (PV)	Rede, PV	Lost ✗
United Socialist Workers' Party	PSTU	2026	Hertz Dias (PSTU)	Vanessa Portugal (PSTU)	-	Lost ✗
United Socialist Workers' Party	PSTU	2022	Vera Lúcia Salgado (PSTU)	Kunã Yporã Tremembé (PSTU)	-	Lost ✗
United Socialist Workers' Party	PSTU	2018	Vera Lúcia Salgado (PSTU)	Hertz Dias (PSTU)	-	Lost ✗
United Socialist Workers' Party	PSTU	2014	José Maria de Almeida (PSTU)	Cláudia Durans (PSTU)	-	Lost ✗
United Socialist Workers' Party	PSTU	2010	José Maria de Almeida (PSTU)	Cláudia Durans (PSTU)	-	Lost ✗
United Socialist Workers' Party	PSTU	2006	Heloísa Helena (PSOL)	César Benjamin (PSOL)	PSOL, PCB, PSTU	Lost ✗
United Socialist Workers' Party	PSTU	2002	José Maria de Almeida (PSTU)	Dayse Oliveira (PSTU)	-	Lost ✗
United Socialist Workers' Party	PSTU	1998	José Maria de Almeida (PSTU)	José Galvão de Lima (PSTU)	-	Lost ✗
United Socialist Workers' Party	PSTU	1994	Luiz Inácio Lula da Silva (PT)	Aloizio Mercadante (PT)	PT, Cidadania, PCB, PCdoB, PSB, PSTU, PV	Lost ✗
We Can	PODE (previously PTN)	2026	-	-	-	-
We Can	PODE (previously PTN)	2022	Simone Tebet (MDB)	Mara Gabrilli (PSDB)	MDB, Always Forward Federation (Cidadania, PSDB), PODE	Lost ✗
We Can	PODE (previously PTN)	2018	Álvaro Dias (Podemos)	Paulo Rabelo de Castro (PSC)	PODE, PSC, AGIR, PRP	Lost ✗
We Can	PODE (previously PTN)	2014	Aécio Neves (PSDB)	Aloysio Nunes (PSDB)	PSDB, AGIR, Avante, DEM, Patriota, PMN, PODE, PTB, Solidariedade	Lost ✗
We Can	PODE (previously PTN)	2010	Dilma Rousseff (PT)	Michel Temer (PMDB)	PT, PMDB, AGIR, PCdoB, PDT, PL, PODE, PSB, PSC, Republicanos	Elected ✓
We Can	PODE (previously PTN)	2006	-	-	-	-
We Can	PODE (previously PTN)	2002	-	-	-	-
We Can	PODE (previously PTN)	1998	Thereza Ruiz (Podemos)	Eduardo Gomes (Podemos)	-	Lost ✗
Workers' Cause Party	PCO	2026	Rui Costa Pimenta (PCO)	Antônio Carlos (PCO)	-	Lost ✗
Workers' Cause Party	PCO	2022	-	-	-	-
Workers' Cause Party	PCO	2018	-	-	-	-
Workers' Cause Party	PCO	2014	Rui Costa Pimenta (PCO)	Ricardo Machado (PCO)	-	Lost ✗
Workers' Cause Party	PCO	2010	Rui Costa Pimenta (PCO)	Edson Dorta Silva (PCO)	-	Lost ✗
Workers' Cause Party	PCO	2006	-	-	-	-
Workers' Cause Party	PCO	2002	Rui Costa Pimenta (PCO)	Pedro Paulo de Abreu (PCO)	-	Lost ✗
Workers' Cause Party	PCO	1998	-	-	-	-
Workers' Party	PT	2026	Luiz Inácio Lula da Silva (PT)	Geraldo Alckmin (PSB)	Brazil of Hope Federation (PT, PCdoB, PV), PSB, PSOL-Rede Federation (PSOL, Rede), PDT	Elected ✓
Workers' Party	PT	2022	Luiz Inácio Lula da Silva (PT)	Geraldo Alckmin (PSB)	Brazil of Hope Federation (PT, PCdoB, PV), PSB, AGIR, Avante, PSOL-Rede Federation (PSOL, Rede), Solidariedade, PROS	Elected ✓
Workers' Party	PT	2018	Fernando Haddad (PT)	Manuela D'Ávila (PCdoB)	PT, PCdoB, PROS	Lost ✗
Workers' Party	PT	2014	Dilma Rousseff (PT)	Michel Temer (PMDB)	PT, PMDB, PCdoB, PDT, PL, PP, PROS, PSD, Republicanos	Elected ✓
Workers' Party	PT	2010	Dilma Rousseff (PT)	Michel Temer (PMDB)	PT, PMDB, AGIR, PCdoB, PDT, PL, PODE, PSB, PSC, Republicanos	Elected ✓
Workers' Party	PT	2006	Luiz Inácio Lula da Silva (PT)	José Alencar (Republicanos)	PT, Republicanos, PCdoB	Elected ✓
Workers' Party	PT	2002	Luiz Inácio Lula da Silva (PT)	José Alencar (PL)	PT, PL, PCB, PCdoB, PMN	Elected ✓
Workers' Party	PT	1998	Luiz Inácio Lula da Silva (PT)	Leonel Brizola (PDT)	PT, PDT, PCB, PCdoB, PSB	Lost ✗
Workers' Party	PT	1994	Luiz Inácio Lula da Silva (PT)	Aloizio Mercadante (PT)	PT, Cidadania, PCB, PCdoB, PSB, PSTU, PV	Lost ✗
Workers' Party	PT	1989	Luiz Inácio Lula da Silva (PT)	José Paulo Bisol (PSB)	PT, PSB, PCdoB	Lost ✗

== Election results, 1982–2026 ==
Brazilian legislative elections (Chamber of Deputies), 1982–2018

Parties	1982	1986	1990	1994	1998	2002	2006	2010	2014	2018	2022	2026
Workers' Party	3.5	6.9	10.2	12.8	13.2	18.4	15.0	16.9	14.0	10.3	12.1	13.0
Brazilian Democratic Movement	43.0	48,1	19.3	20.3	15.2	13.4	14.6	13.0	11.1	5.5	7.2	6.9
Brazilian Social Democracy Party	-	-	8.7	13.9	17.5	14.3	13.6	11.9	11.4	6.0	3.0	2.4
Brazil Union	-	-	-	-	-	-	-	-	-	-	9.3	6.9
Liberal Front Party / Democrats	-	17.7	12.4	12.9	17.3	13.4	10.9	7.6	4.2	4.7	-	-
Party of the Republic / Liberal Party	-	2.8	4.3	3.5	2.5	4.3	4.4	7.6	5.8	5.3	16.6	22.7
Brazilian Socialist Party	-	0.9	1.9	2.2	3.4	5.3	6.2	7.1	6.5	5.5	3.8	4.4
Progressistas	-	-	-	6.9	11.3	7.8	7.1	6.6	6.4	5.6	7.9	6.7
Democratic Labour Party	5.8	6.5	10.0	7.2	5.7	5.1	5.2	5.0	3.6	4.6	3.5	1.6
Brazilian Labour Party	4.5	4.5	5.6	5.2	5.7	4.6	4.7	4.2	4.0	2.1	1.3	-
Green Party	-	-	-	0.1	0.4	1.3	3.6	3.8	2.1	1.6	0.9	1.2
Social Christian Party	-	-	0.8	0.5	0.7	0.6	1.9	3.2	2.5	1.8	-	-
Communist Party of Brazil	-	0.8	0.9	1.2	1.3	2.2	2.1	2.8	2.0	1.4	1.0	1.1
Popular Socialist Party / Cidadania	-	0.9	1.0	0.6	1.3	3.1	3.9	2.6	2.0	1.6	1.5	0.3
Brazilian Republican Party / Republicanos	-	-	-	-	-	-	0.3	1.7	4.5	5.1	7.0	6.9
Socialism and Liberty Party	-	-	-	-	-	-	1.2	1.2	1.8	2.8	3.5	4.7
Party of National Mobilization / National Mobilization	-	-	0.6	0.6	0.5	0.3	0.9	1.1	0.5	0.6	0.2	0.0
Democratic Social / Reform Progressive Party	43.2	7.8	8.9	9.4	-	-	-	-	-	-	-	-
National Reconstruction Party / Christian Labour Party / Agir	-	-	8.3	0.4	0.1	0.1	0.9	0.6	0.7	0.6	0.1	0.0
Christian Democratic Party / Christian Social Democratic Party / Christian Democracy	-	1.2	3.0	-	0.1	0.2	0.4	0.2	0.5	0.4	0.0	0.1
Party of the Reconstruction of the National Order	-	-	-	0.7	0.9	2.1	1.0	-	-	-	-	-
Social Democratic Party	-	-	-	-	-	-	-	-	6.2	5.8	7.6	8.2
Republican Party of the Social Order	-	-	-	-	-	-	-	-	2.0	2.1	-	-
Solidariedade	-	-	-	-	-	-	-	-	2.7	2.0	1.6	0.9
National Labour Party / Podemos	-	-	-	-	0.1	0.1	0.2	0.2	0.4	2.3	3.3	5.2
National Ecologic Party / Patriota	-	-	-	-	-	-	-	-	0.7	1.5	1.4	-
Labour Party of Brazil / Avante	-	-	0.2	-	0.3	0.2	0.3	0.7	0.8	1.9	2.0	1.6
Humanist Party of Solidarity	-	-	-	-	-	0.3	0.5	0.8	0.9	1.5	-	-
Progressive Republican Party	-	-	0.2	0.5	0.4	0.3	0.3	0.3	0.7	0.9	-	-
Social Liberal Party	-	-	-	-	0.3	0.5	0.2	0.5	0.8	11.7	-	-
Brazilian Labour Renewal Party	-	-	-	0.1	0.1	0.3	0.2	0.3	0.5	0.7	0.3	0.0
New Party	-	-	-	-	-	-	-	-	-	2.8	1.2	2.6
Sustainability Network	-	-	-	-	-	-	-	-	-	0.8	0.7	0.2
Mission Party	-	-	-	-	-	-	-	-	-	-	-	1.1
Others	0.0	2.8	3.7	0.7	1.7	1.5	0.4	0.0	0.7	0.7	0.2	0.0

Source: Source:

=== Referendums ===
Brazil has held three national referendums in its history. In the first, held on January 6, 1963, the people voted for the re-establishment of the presidential system of government (82% of valid ballots), which had been modified by a constitutional amendment in 1961. A second referendum, as ordered by the Federal Constitution of 1988, was held on April 21, 1993, when the voters voted for a republican form of government and reaffirmed the presidential system.

A third national referendum, on the prohibition of the commerce of personal firearms and ammunition, was held on October 23, 2005. The ban proposal was rejected by 64% of the electorate.

== See also ==
- Censorship in Brazil
- Electoral calendar
- Electoral system
- List of political parties in Brazil
- List of senators in Brazil
