= Severo Gomes =

Former Brazilian politician and businessman

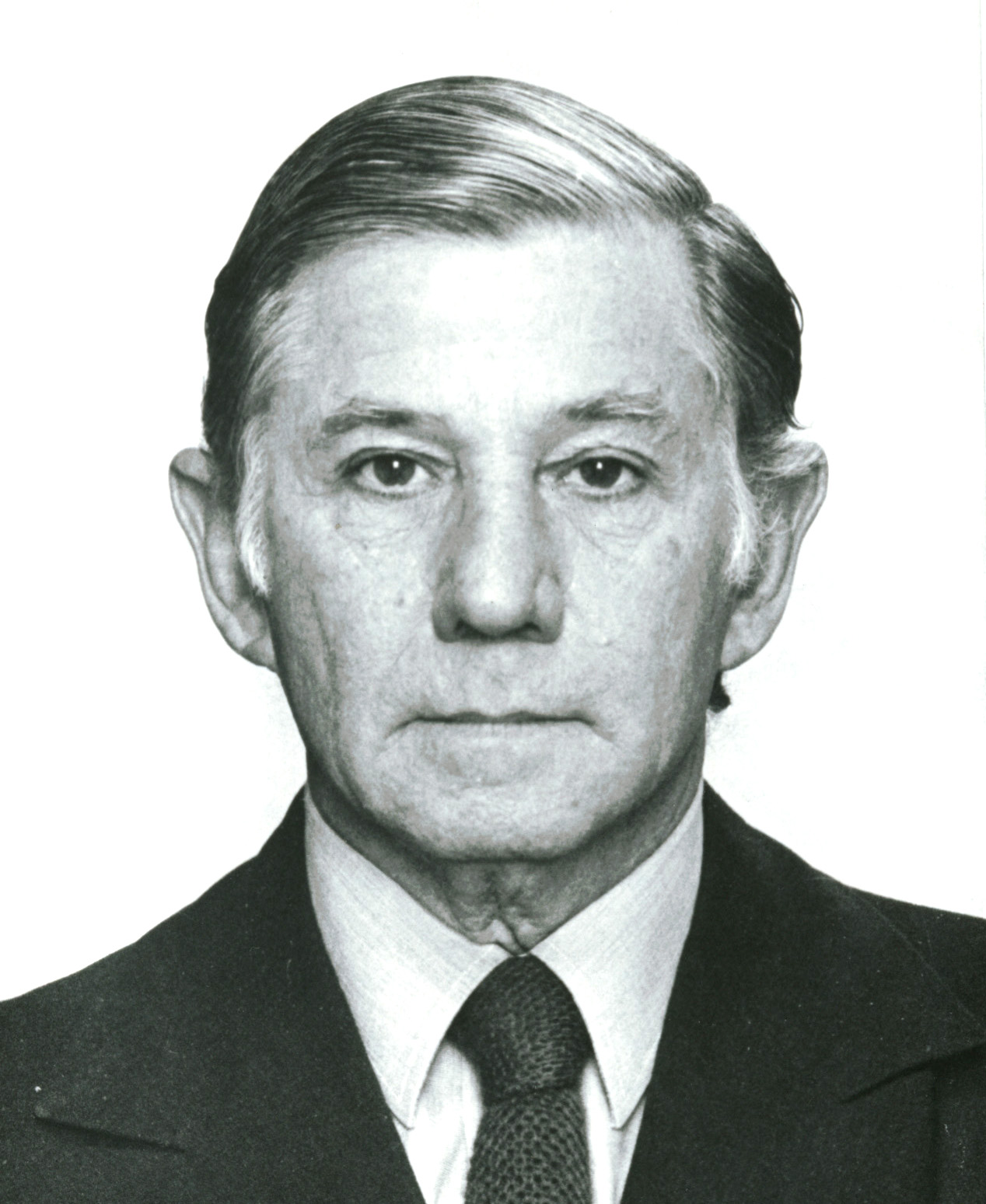

Minister of Agriculture of Brazil
- In office 12 August 1966 – 15 March 1967
- President: Castelo Branco
- Preceded by: Nei Braga
- Succeeded by: Ivo Arzua Pereira

Minister of Industry and Trade of Brazil
- In office 15 March 1974 – 8 February 1977
- President: Ernesto Geisel
- Preceded by: Pratini de Moraes
- Succeeded by: Ângelo Calmon de Sá

Senator for São Paulo
- In office 15 March 1983 – 1 February 1991
- Preceded by: Orestes Quércia
- Succeeded by: Eduardo Suplicy

Personal details
- Born: Severo Fagundes Gomes; 10 August 1924 São Paulo, SP, Brazil
- Died: 12 October 1992 (aged 68) Angra dos Reis, RJ, Brazil
- Party: PMDB
- Spouse: Anna Maria Henriqueta Marsiaj
- Parents: Olívio Gomes (father); Augusta Fagundes Gomes (mother)
- Education: University of São Paulo
- Profession: Businessman; Lawyer

Severo Fagundes Gomes (10 August 1924 – 12 October 1992) was a Brazilian politician and businessman. He was a Minister of State in Brazil and a Senator representing the state of São Paulo.

An entrepreneur in the agricultural and weaving sectors, with Tecelagem Parahyba, he played an important role in his mandate as senator during redemocratization.

Severo died in a helicopter crash off the coast of Angra dos Reis, in the south of Rio de Janeiro state, which was also carrying Ulysses Guimarães.

== Biography ==
=== Early years and education ===
The son of Augusta Fagundes Gomes and Olívio Gomes, Severo studied at traditional schools in the city of São Paulo, such as Caetano de Campos Normal School and St. Louis College.

He entered the traditional Law School of the University of São Paulo (USP). At the Faculty of Law, both student organizations were linked to the government of President Getúlio Vargas. Gomes was one of the founders of a third group, the Academic Front for Democracy, and one of the signatories of the 'Manifesto to the Nation' (1/11/1943) against the Estado Novo, sponsored by the XI de Agosto Academic Center. He also studied Social Sciences at Faculty of Philosophy, Languages and Human Sciences.

=== Career ===
Gomes graduated in law in 1947 and joined the family business. Influential in São Paulo's economic elite, he held advisory positions in trade associations and banks. He was also close to intellectuals and artists and was director of the São Paulo Museum of Modern Art (MAM).

A sympathizer of the National Democratic Union (UDN), he took part in the preparations for the military coup against President João Goulart, which began the Brazilian military dictatorship. After managing Banco do Brasil's agricultural credit portfolio, Castelo Branco announced him as Minister of Agriculture to replace Ney Braga. Close to the Minister of Finance, Antônio Delfim Netto, he took part in drawing up policies to curb the Land Statute.

At the end of Castello Branco's government, he was removed from the government of Costa e Silva and Médici – who disliked Severo. After Geisel became president, Severo returned to the military government, this time as Minister of Industry and Trade. Incisive defender of nationalism, protectionism and Market reserves, he defended the ban on the indiscriminate entry of foreign companies into the country and was one of the driving forces behind the National Information Technology Policy, with Cristina Tavares.

From the outset, he sought to apply what he would later call the "strategy of national independence". To this end, the policy of the Industrial Development Council (CDI), a body linked to his ministry, was reformulated to strengthen national companies. During a trip to Rio Grande do Sul, he took on the defense of local shoe manufacturers, who were suffering from the imposition of import surcharges by the US government, while at the same time advocating the search for alternative markets. The US ambassador to Brazil, John Crimmins, later expressed his concern about the content of the statements.

In a lecture given at the Escola Superior de Guerra (ESG) in Rio de Janeiro, he pointed out the risks of excessive dependence on foreign markets and an inordinate involvement of foreign capital in the country's economy. He identified distortions in the economy and society resulting from the new direction taken by government policy after 1967, highlighting the concentration of income, regional inequalities and the deterioration of living conditions in large urban centers.

With this nationalist vision, in the same year he stopped the purchase of the Consul refrigerator factory in Santa Catarina by the Dutch group Philips. Because of his ideological views, hostility towards Severo Gomes increased in some of the country's largest newspapers, notably O Estado de S. Paulo and Jornal do Brasil.

With his political positions, his divergence with another government current of thought deepened, which was evidenced at the end of May when the ministers of Finance, Mário Henrique Simonsen, Planning and General Coordination, João Paulo dos Reis Veloso, and Agriculture, Alysson Paolinelli.

In December, when paranymphing a graduating class at the Technological Institute of Aeronautics (ITA) in São José dos Campos, he insisted on the same themes and defended the debate on the "Brazilian model". The following month, he began to clearly preach political openness. In a lecture at the Federation of Industries of Rio Grande do Sul (FIERGS), he proposed "a pact between small and medium-sized companies and the government that would strengthen national life politically", the only way to "control the actions of state and foreign companies". He said that "companies in Rio and São Paulo are allied with the big multinationals to prevent changes in the government's economic policy" and mentioned the "extreme right-wing forces that are preventing greater political openness".

On 1 February 1977, Severo Gomes attended a dinner in São Paulo hosted by the president of the Cica group and Auxiliar Bank, Rodolfo Bonfiglioli. During the reception, he got into a heated argument with engineer Carlos D'Alamo Lousada, a board member of the French and Brazilian Bank. A participant in the Dictatorship's conspiratorial phase, Lousada had been linked to Admiral Sílvio Heck, with whom he later had a falling out, and had established relations with the Costa e Silva and Garrastazu Médici governments. After an exchange of accusations in which Severo Gomes was called a "leftist minister" and Lousada retorted by calling him a "fascist businessman", the two insulted each other with swear words.

Severo in 1974.

Later, Lousada phoned Roberto Médici, son of former president Garrastazu Médici, denouncing that Severo Gomes had called the two governments prior to General Geisel's fascist. After successive phone calls, the matter reached the president, who requested a report from the National Intelligence Service (SNI) and summoned the minister. The minister confirmed what he had said during the reception, including that "the military establishment opts for absolute security, which generates insecurity in civil society". In February 1977, Severo Gomes was received by the President's Chief of Staff, Golbery do Couto e Silva, asking Severo to resign from his post. The following day, the minister handed in his letter of resignation to the President of the Republic. After the dismiss, In the evening, the Rio newspaper Tribuna da Imprensa was banned from publishing any information about his resignation. Its editor, Hélio Fernandes, rebelled against the order given by the Federal Police censors who had been present in the newspaper's newsroom since 1968, and in the early hours of the next morning the newspaper's edition was seized at the printing plant before being distributed.

He helped to secure his party's nomination for Paulo Maluf to be governor of São Paulo in 1978. After leaving the ministry, he left National Renewal Alliance (ARENA), the party that supported the dictatorship. In follow year, with Almino Afonso, Teotônio Vilela, Fernando Henrique Cardoso and Raphael de Almeida Magalhães joined to Brazilian Democratic Movement Party (PMDB), opposite party to dictatorship and favor to political openness.

Affiliated to PMDB, in the 1982 São Paulo gubernatorial elections, he was elected senator for the state of São Paulo, receiving 2 860 435 votes. Together Ulysses Guimarães, he supported the Diretas Já movement for direct votes for the presidency of Brazil and used to go to the Senate wearing a yellow tie in support of the movement. His agenda was protectionism and national industrialization, and he was critical of the liberalizing ideas of Senator Roberto Campos.

He didn't run for re-election and in March 1991, he took over as São Paulo's Secretary of Science and Technology and Economic Development in the government of Luiz Antônio Fleury Filho (1991–1995), but stayed on for a short time, leaving in June because he didn't accept a fraud - overpricing - in the import of equipment from Israel for USP and the State University of Campinas (Unicamp), which had taken place at the end of governor Orestes Quércia's administration (1987–1991). (Note: Despite the accusations, Quércia was acquitted of the charges.) He then returned to private enterprise.

=== Death ===
Severo died on 12 October 1992, the victim of a helicopter crash in the region of Angra dos Reis, in the interior of the state of Rio de Janeiro, after returning from a weekend in the city. His wife Maria, Ulysses Guimarães and his wife, Mora Guimarães, were on the flight.

In his honor, a park in the Granja Julieta neighborhood of São Paulo bears his name.

== Personal life ==
He was married to Maria Henriqueta Marsiaj Gomes, with whom he had three children, two girls and a boy. He lost his only son, Pedro, at the age of twenty after a car accident in the city of São Paulo in 1978.

He defined himself as a man of the center, conservative, but marked by the "liberalism of the Arcades, of the old square of São Francisco, where I studied law".
