= Brazilian Constituent Assembly (1988) =

Brazilian assembly to establish a new constitution

National Constitutional Assembly Assembleia Nacional Constituinte

Type
- Type: Unicameral constituent assembly

History
- Founded: 1 February 1987
- Disbanded: 22 July 1988

Leadership
- President: Ulysses Guimarães, PMDB
- 1st Vice President: Mauro Benevides, PMDB
- 2nd Vice President: Jorge Arbage, PDS

Structure
- Seats: 559 constituents
- Political groups: Government (509): PMDB (303); PFL (135); PDS (38); PTB (18); PL (7); PDC (6); PSC (1); PMB (1); Opposition (50): PDT (26); PT (16); PCdoB (3); PCB (3); PSB (2)
- Authority: Constitutional Amendment no. 26 of 27 November 1985

Elections
- Voting system: Open list proportional representation (Deputies); Dual-member block voting (Senators)
- Last election: 15 November 1986

Meeting place
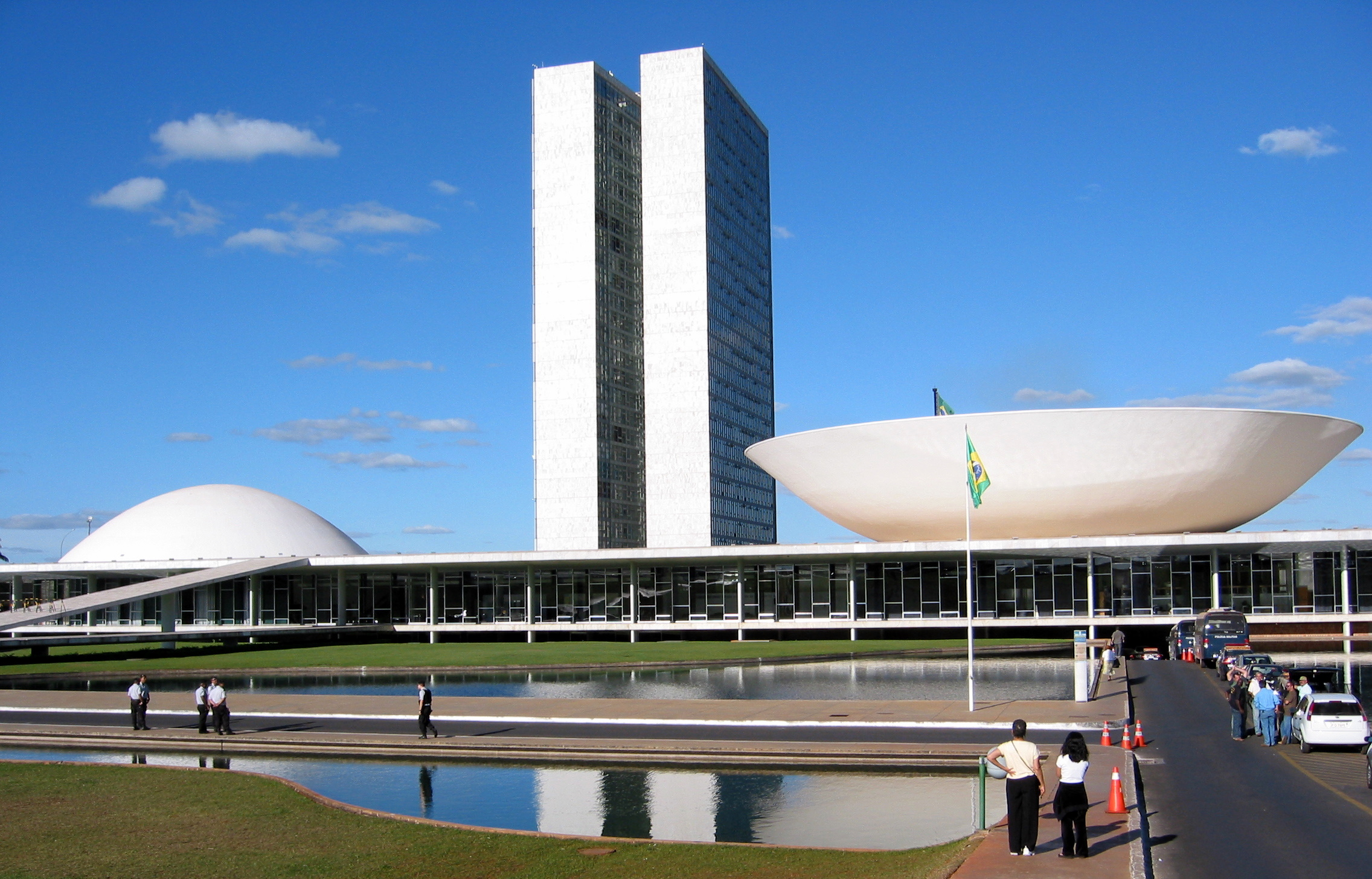
- Nereu Ramos Palace; Brasília, Federal District, Brazil

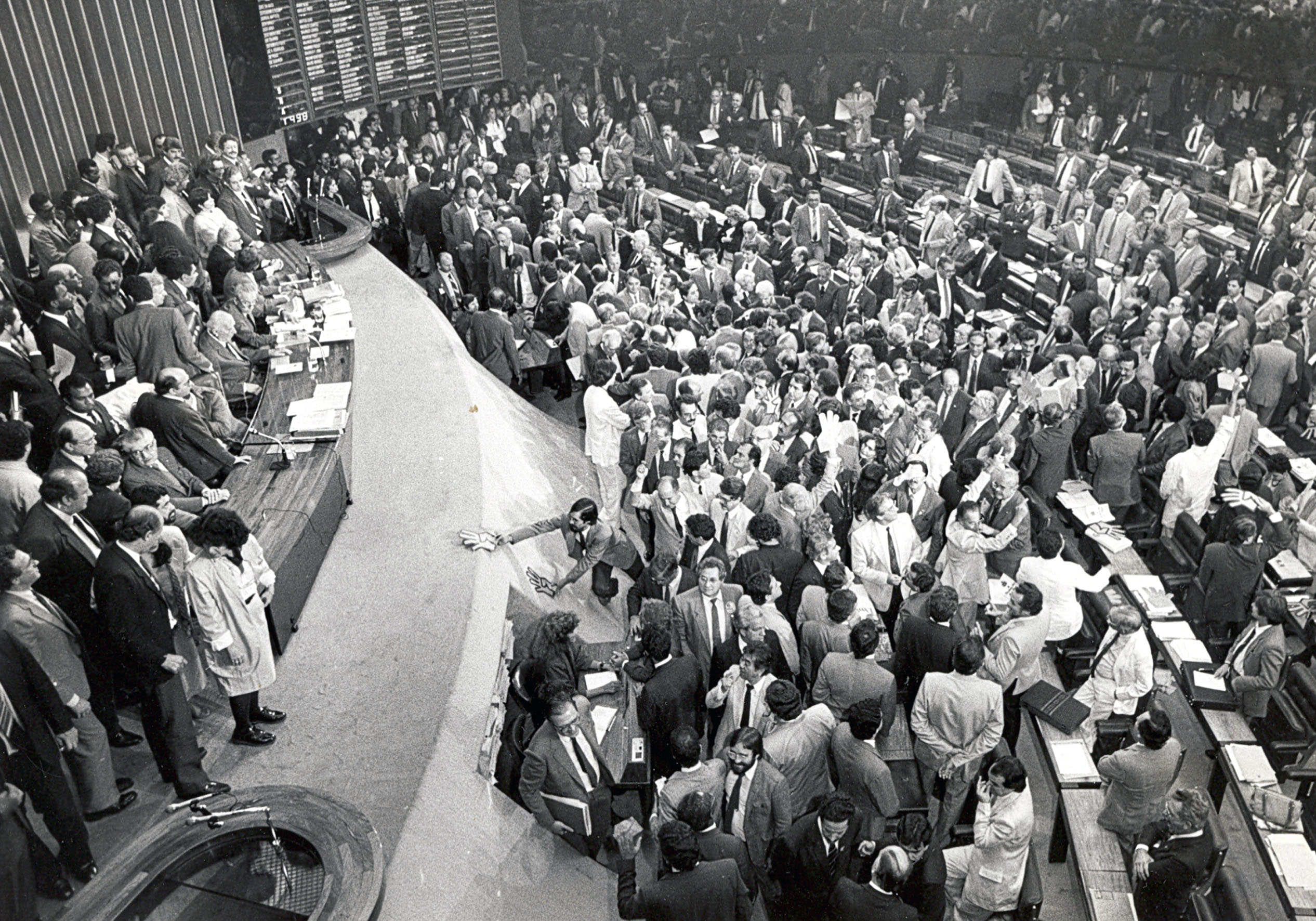
The final working session of the 1988 Constituent Assembly, in which Constituent Deputies approved the final text of country's new Constitution, that days later was promulgated in solemn session.

The 1988 Constituent Assembly (Portuguese: Assembléia Constituinte de 1988), also known as the National Constituent Assembly (Portuguese: Assembléia Nacional Constituinte) was held in Brasília to establish Brazil's new democratic Constitution after 21 years under military rule. In November 1986, general elections were held to elect the members of the constituent assembly, which took office on February 1, 1987. Ulysses Guimarães, from the Brazilian Democratic Movement Party of São Paulo, served as president of the Assembly.

The majority in the Constituent Assembly was formed by the Democratic Centre (PMDB, PFL, PTB, PDS, and smaller parties), also known as "Big Centre" (Centrão). They were supported by the executive branch and represented conservative factions of the society, and had a decisive influence in the work of the Constituent and the outcome of important decisions, such as the duration of then President Sarney's term, the maintenance of the agrarian policy and the role of the Armed Forces.

== See also ==
- Brazilian Constituent Assembly (1823)
