= Brazilian Socialist Party =

Political party in Brazil

Brazilian Socialist Party Partido Socialista Brasileiro
- President: João Henrique Campos
- Founded: Current: 2 July 1989; 37 years ago; Historical: 6 August 1947; 79 years ago
- Split from: National Democratic Union
- Headquarters: SCLN 304, bloco "A", Entrada 63, sobreloja Brasília, Brazil
- Newspaper: Folha Socialista (1947–1964)
- Youth wing: Juventude Socialista Brasileira (JSB)
- Women's wing: Mulheres Socialistas
- LGBT wing: LGBT Socialista
- Black wing: Negritude Socialista Brasileira (NSB)
- Membership: 648,012
- Ideology: Social liberalism; Social democracy; Progressivism; Historical: Democratic socialism; Christian socialism
- Political position: Centre to centre-left; Historical: Left-wing
- Regional affiliation: São Paulo Forum (1991–2019)
- International affiliation: Progressive Alliance
- Colours: Red; Orange; Yellow
- Slogan: Socialism and Freedom
- Anthem: The Internationale
- TSE Identification Number: 40
- Chamber of Deputies: 17 / 513
- Federal Senate: 4 / 81
- Governorships: 3 / 27
- State Assemblies: 71 / 1,059
- Mayors: 327 / 5,566
- City councillors: 3,484 / 51,748

Website
- www.psb40.org.br

The Brazilian Socialist Party (Portuguese: Partido Socialista Brasileiro, PSB) is a centre-left political party in Brazil. It was founded in 1947, before being abolished by the military regime in 1965 and was refounded in 1989 after the re-democratisation of Brazil.

The PSB is considered a center-left and moderate party, supporting the governments of presidents Itamar Franco, Luiz Inácio Lula da Silva and Dilma Rousseff, while it opposed the governments of Fernando Collor, Michel Temer (interim) and Jair Bolsonaro. The party also maintained an independent or partially oppositional stance at times toward Fernando Henrique Cardoso and the second term of Dilma Rousseff. It has also elected Geraldo Alckmin as Vice President of Brazil in 2022 and 2026 as Lula's running mate.

The original PSB (1947–1965) was influenced by European social democracy and progressive Catholic movements, counting prominent intellectuals such as João Mangabeira among its founders. The modern PSB was refounded in 1989 under the leadership of Miguel Arraes, linking the party’s historical socialist ideals with Brazil’s post-dictatorship democratic resurgence. After the leadership of Arraes from 1993 to 2005, it became led by the Campos family, with Eduardo Campos and, after his death in a plane crash in 2014, his son João Campos.

Ideologically, the PSB defines itself as socialist and social-democratic, but it has frequently adopted a pragmatic stance, positioning itself as a catch-all party within Brazil’s center-left spectrum, engaging in dialogue with and accommodating members beyond the left. To this end, during Lula's third and fourth terms, the PSB has become associated with formerly centre-right figures who support Lula, including Lula's Vice President Geraldo Alckmin (a former member of the PSDB) and former Minister of Planning and Budget Simone Tebet (formerly of the MDB).

== History ==
=== First PSB (1947–1965) ===
The name Brazilian Socialist Party or variants had been used by several small socialist parties of brief existence prior to the foundation of PSB on 1947.

PSB has its origins at the end of Getúlio Vargas' Estado Novo regime, when the Democratic Left (Esquerda Democrática – ED) emerged as a faction of the National Democratic Union (União Democrática Nacional – UDN) in 1945. Its goals were to combine the social changes of the period with broad civil and political liberties. ED's ideology was based on a broad left-wing concept: it advocated that socialism had to be built gradually and legally, through the defence of democracy and a national identity. In this sense, it differed greatly from other opposition parties, such as UDN, which advocated free market policies, and the Communist Party (PCB), which advocated the authoritarian socialism of the Soviet Union.

As UDN became increasingly a right-leaning party, binding itself with the Brazilian Army and the aspirations of urban middle classes, ED's Socialist proposals were extremely at odds with the party, which led to a split and the subsequent foundation of PSB. On 6 August 1947, the Brazilian Socialist Party was founded, maintaining the same program and proposals it had as a faction of the UDN. In its 1947 manifesto, the PSB sought to represent an alternative to the main left-wing parties of that period: Vargas' Brazilian Labour Party (PTB) and the Brazilian Communist Party (PCB). PSB opposed the centralism and authoritarianism of Vargas, as well as the rigid labour union structure supported by PTB. They opposed PCB's cult of personality and radical Marxism, which placed the PSB in the centre-left to left-wing spectrum, between radical Marxism and social democracy.

PSB proposed to be a party of "everyone who relies on their own work". It advocated immediate reforms, such as the nationalisation of economically strategic areas, the expansion of workers' rights, the ensuring of public health and education, and the development of democracy through means of popular participation. Its structure brought a new experience which characterised PSB's democratic profile: the Base Centres (núcleos de base). Through them, Socialist militants could get involved in the party project, discuss national issues and form the orientation and the target of partisan action.

In the 1950 election, PSB's candidate, João Mangabeira won only 0.12% of the vote and the PSB elected only one deputy from Sergipe. At the same time, the PSB approached the PCB, banned in 1947 and operating underground. A number of communists ran for office under the PSB's endorsement.

In the 1955 election, the PSB endorsed the UDN candidate, Juarez Távora. In São Paulo, the PSB supported the electoral endeavors of Jânio Quadros: first in the São Paulo mayoral election in 1953 and Quadros' successful bid for Governor in 1954. However, the PSB's support for Quadros, a rather middle-class reformer, split the party, a split which ended with the expulsion of Quadros supporters from the party. In the 1960 election, won by Quadros, the PSB supported the candidacy of Henrique Teixeira Lott.

The PSB had limited legislative representation between 1947 and 1964, but in 1962 it elected one Senator, Aurélio Viana defeated the UDN's candidate, Juracy Magalhães in Guanabara State.

The party supported left-wing President João Goulart, who was overthrown by the military in 1964, which later abolished all parties, including the PSB, in 1965. Most Socialists joined the Brazilian Democratic Movement (MDB), the only opposition party recognised by the military regime. Following the fall of the military in 1985, a number of former PSB members joined the Democratic Labour Party or the Workers' Party (PT).

=== Second PSB (1989–present) ===
Following the return to a democracy in the country, a Brazilian Socialist Party was re-organised on the 1947 manifesto. At first, it achieved limited electoral success, though it elected some legislators and mayors. In the 1989 presidential election, it supported the PT candidate, Luiz Inácio Lula da Silva.

In 1990, Pernambuco Governor Miguel Arraes joined the party, giving the PSB a certain electoral boost in subsequent elections. In the 1994 election, the party again endorsed Lula. In the same election, Arraes was re-elected Governor with 54% by the first round, and the PSB elected another governor, João Capiberibe, in Amapá, as well as a Senator in Pará. The party continued to grow with the adhesion of several officeholders in 1995 and 1996, but it did not endorse the left-wing candidacy of Ciro Gomes in the 1998 election, preferring to endorse Lula. The same year, Arraes was defeated in Pernambuco but the party gained the governorship of Alagoas.

In 2000, the Governor of Rio de Janeiro, Anthony Garotinho joined the PSB following a feud with Leonel Brizola, the leader of the Democratic Labour Party. The adhesion of Garotinho caused several members of the PSB to leave the party to join Lula's PT. The PSB supported Garotinho's candidacy in the 2002 election, winning 17.9% in the first round.

However, Garotinho's membership proved a source of controversy and division, notably with President Lula's government. The split was resolved when Garotinho left the party in 2003. The party unofficially supported Lula's re-election in 2006 and won 27 deputies in the 2006 election. After that election, the PSB had three Governors: Cid Gomes (Ceará), Eduardo Campos (Pernambuco) and Wilma de Faria (Rio Grande do Norte).

Ciro Gomes joined the PSB in 2003, and was expected to be the PSB's candidate in the 2010 election; however, the PSB decided not to run a presidential candidate.

The PSB did well overall in the 2010 elections; it picked up 7 seats in the Chamber of Deputies for a total of 34 seats, and regained representation in the Senate, winning 3 Senate seats. While it lost the governorship of Rio Grande do Norte, it easily retained the governorships of Ceará and Pernambuco and also overwhelmingly won the governorship of Espírito Santo. Following runoffs, it also won the governorships of Amapá, Paraíba, and Piauí, for a total of six state governorships.

Despite its socialist name and identity, the PSB was criticised by many on the Brazilian political scene, especially on the left, for its efforts to attract right-wing Brazilian politicians like senator Heraclito Fortes, and to support the candidacy of Eduardo Campos and, later, Marina Silva. These positions led many traditional socialists and social-democrats in Brazil to leave the party for more left-wing outfits such as the PSOL and PDT.

In 2014 general elections, the PSB did not support Rousseff and was part of the United for Brazil coalition, which supported Marina Silva as its presidential candidate. It advocated greater economic stability, low inflation, high economic growth, sustainable development, and social welfare programs. The party did well in the legislative elections, electing 34 deputies and seven senators.

The party later voted in favour of the impeachment of Dilma Rousseff and formed a coalition government with Brazil's new president, Michel Temer.

In May 2017, the PSB withdrew its support from Temer and went into opposition.

In the 2018 general election, PSB did not support any candidate (although some members of the party supported Ciro Gomes of the Democratic Labour Party) in the first round; it later endorsed Fernando Haddad of the Workers' Party in the second round. The party saw a decrease in support in the parliamentary election, winning 32 deputies and two senators. PSB later joined the opposition to Jair Bolsonaro.

On 30 August 2019, the Brazilian Socialist Party withdrew from the Foro de Sao Paulo, denouncing its support of Nicolas Maduro's presidency.

In 2022, Geraldo Alckmin, a founder and member of the Brazilian Social Democracy Party (PSDB) and rival of the Workers' party, left PSDB and joined the Brazilian Socialist Party, running as Lula's running mate in the 2022 general election, winning the run-off.

== International relations ==
Despite being a socialist party, the PSB has never been a member of the Socialist International (position held by the Democratic Labour Party). However, in 2013, it joined the newly formed Progressive Alliance.

In 1991, the party joined the Foro de Sao Paulo, an association of South American leftist parties which also included the majority of Brazilian left-wing formations (PCB, PCdoB, PT, PDT and, until 2004, PPS). However, in 2019 PSB withdrew from the Foro, denouncing its support for the regime of Nicolas Maduro in Venezuela.

== Election results ==
=== Presidential elections ===
Election	Candidate	Running mate	Colligation	First round		Second round		Result
Election	Candidate	Running mate	Colligation	Votes	%	Votes	%	Result
1950	João Mangabeira (PSB)	None	None	9,466	0.12% (#4)	–	–	Lost ✗
1950	None	Alípio Correia Neto (PSB)	None	10,800	0,15% (#5)	–	–	Lost ✗
1955	Juarez Távora (UDN)	None	UDN; PDC; PL; PSB	2,610,462	30.27% (#2)	–	–	Lost ✗
1955	None	Milton Campos (UDN)	UDN; PDC; PL; PSB	3,384,739	41,70% (#2)	–	–	Lost ✗
1960	Henrique Teixeira Lott (PSD)	None	PSD; PTB; PST; PSB; PRT	3,846,825	32.94% (#2)	–	–	Lost ✗
1960	None	João Goulart (PTB)	PTB; PSD; PST; PSB; PRT	4,547,010	36,10% (#1)	–	–	Elected ✓
1964	None	None	None	–	–	–	–	–
1966	None	None	None	–	–	–	–	–
1969	None	None	None	–	–	–	–	–
1974	None	None	None	–	–	–	–	–
1978	None	None	None	–	–	–	–	–
1985	None	None	None	–	–	–	–	–
1989	Luiz Inácio Lula da Silva (PT)	José Paulo Bisol (PSB)	PT; PSB; PCdoB	11,622,673	16.1% (#2)	31,076,364	47.0% (#2)	Lost ✗
1994	Luiz Inácio Lula da Silva (PT)	Aloizio Mercadante (PT)	PT; PSB; PCdoB; PPS; PV; PSTU	17,122,127	27.0% (#2)	–	–	Lost ✗
1998	Luiz Inácio Lula da Silva (PT)	Leonel Brizola (PDT)	PT; PDT; PSB; PCdoB; PCB	21,475,211	31.7% (#2)	–	–	Lost ✗
2002	Anthony Garotinho (PSB)	José Antônio Figueiredo (PSB)	PSB; PGT; PTC	15,180,097	17.86% (#3)	–	–	Lost ✗
2006	None	None	None	–	–	–	–	–
2010	Dilma Rousseff (PT)	Michel Temer (PMDB)	PT; PMDB; PR; PSB; PDT; PCdoB; PSC; PRB; PTC; PTN	47,651,434	46.9% (#1)	55,752,529	56.1% (#1)	Elected ✓
2014	Marina Silva (PSB)	Beto Albuquerque (PSB)	PSB; PHS; PRP; PPS; PPL; PSL	22,176,619	21.32% (#3)	–	–	Lost ✗
2018	None	None	None	–	–	–	–	–
2022	Luiz Inácio Lula da Silva (PT)	Geraldo Alckmin (PSB)	PT; PCdoB; PV; PSOL; REDE; PSB; Solidariedade; Avante; Agir	57,259,504	48.43% (#1)	60,345,999	50.90% (#1)	Elected ✓
2026	Luiz Inácio Lula da Silva (PT)	Geraldo Alckmin (PSB)	PT; PCdoB; PV; PSOL; REDE; PSB; PDT	53,879,538	45.16% (#2)	64,256,232	51.79% (#1)	Elected ✓

=== Chamber of Deputies and Senate elections ===
Election	Chamber of Deputies				Federal Senate				Role in government
Election	Votes	%	Seats	+/–	Votes	%	Seats	+/–	Role in government
1986	450,948	0.95%	1 / 487	New	N/A	N/A	0 / 49	New	Opposition
1990	756,034	1.87%	11 / 502	▲10	N/A	N/A	0 / 31	0	Coalition
1994	995,298	2.18%	15 / 513	▲4	2,336,549	2.44%	1 / 54	▲1	Opposition
1998	2,273,751	3.41%	19 / 513	▲4	3,949,025	6.39%	3 / 81	▲2	Opposition
2002	4,616,674	5.28%	22 / 513	▲3	3,389,139	2.21%	4 / 81	▲1	Opposition
2006	5,732,464	6.15%	27 / 513	▲5	2,143,355	2.54%	3 / 81	▼1	Coalition
2010	6,851,053	7.09%	34 / 513	▲7	6,129,463	3.60%	3 / 81	0	Coalition
2014	6,267,878	6.44%	34 / 513	0	12,123,194	13.57%	7 / 81	▲4	Independent (2014–2016)
2014	6,267,878	6.44%	34 / 513	0	12,123,194	13.57%	7 / 81	▲4	Opposition (2016–2018)
2018	5,386,400	5.48%	32 / 513	▼2	8,234,195	4.80%	2 / 81	▼5	Opposition
2022	4,202,376	3.81%	14 / 513	▼18	13,615,846	13.39%	1 / 81	▼1	Coalition
2026	5,007,692	4.40%	15 / 513	▲1	14,804,125	7.14%	4 / 81	▲3	Coalition

=== Prominent Members ===
- Geraldo Alckmin, Vice President of Brazil and former Minister of Development, Industry and Foreign Trade
- Renato Casagrande, former Governor of Espírito Santo
- João Azevêdo, Governor of Paraíba
- Tabata Amaral, Federal Deputy for the state of São Paulo and education activist
- Flávio Arns, Senator for the State of Paraná
- Augusto de Arruda Botelho, Brazilian jurist, Law Professor, writer, Human Rights activist and former National Justice Secretary

== Notes ==
Preceded by 36 – Act (Agir)	Numbers of Brazilian Official Political Parties; 40 – BSP (PSB)	Succeeded by 43 – GP (PV)
