= Iluska Pereira da Cunha Simonsen =

Brazilian chess player (1941–2017)

Iluska Simonsen
Personal information
- Full name: Iluska Pereira da Cunha Simonsen
- Born: 22 February 1941
- Died: 28 March 2017 (aged 76)

Chess career
- Country: Brazil
- Title: ICCF Lady Grandmaster (2000)
- ICCF rating: 2359 (October 2005)
- ICCF peak rating: 2464 (July 1993)

Iluska Pereira da Cunha Simonsen (22 February 1941 – 28 March 2017) was a Brazilian chess player who held the ICCF title of Lady International Correspondence Chess Grand Master (2000).

== Biography ==
In the mid of 1970s Iluska Pereira da Cunha Simonsen was one of the leading Brazilian chess female players. She has participated in many Brazilian Women's Chess Championships. In 1978, in Brasília Iluska Pereira da Cunha Simonsen participated in the Women's World Chess Championship South American Zonal Tournament and shared 5th-6th place with Julia Arias.

Iluska Pereira da Cunha Simonsen played for Brazil in the Women's Chess Olympiad:

- In 1978, at second board in the 8th Chess Olympiad (women) in Buenos Aires (+4, =5, -0).

In later years, Iluska Pereira da Cunha Simonsen active participated in correspondence chess tournaments. She participated in 5th Ladies World Championship Final (1993-1998) and ranked in 5th place. In 1993, Iluska Pereira da Cunha Simonsen was awarded the ICCF International Correspondence Chess Master (IM) title. In 2000, she received Lady International Correspondence Chess Grand Master title.

By profession Iluska Pereira da Cunha Simonsen was an anthropologist.

== Family ==
She was married to Brazilian economist Mário Henrique Simonsen. They had two sons and a daughter.
