= Ulysses Guimarães =

Brazilian politician and lawyer (1916–1992)

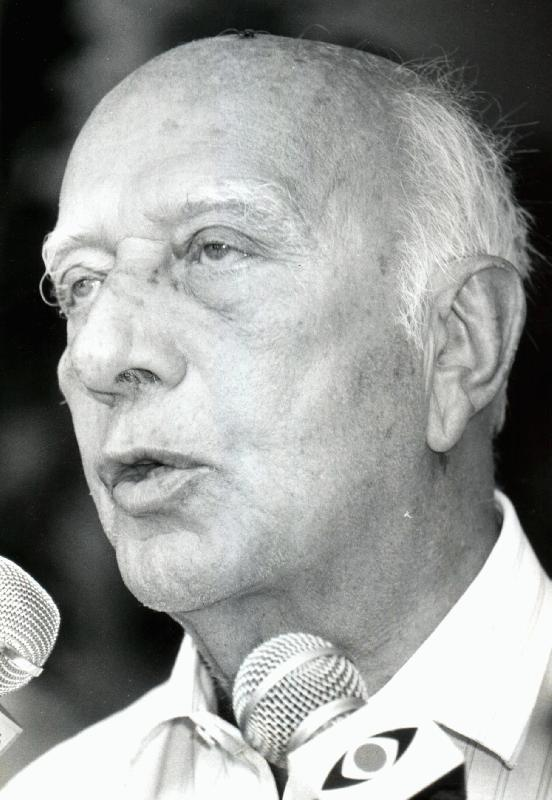

President of the Chamber of Deputies
- In office 28 February 1985 – 15 February 1989
- Preceded by: Flávio Marcílio
- Succeeded by: Paes de Andrade
- In office 11 March 1956 – 11 March 1958
- Preceded by: Flores da Cunha
- Succeeded by: Ranieri Mazzilli

Minister of Industry and Trade
- In office 8 September 1961 – 18 September 1962
- President: João Goulart
- Preceded by: Artur Bernardes Filho
- Succeeded by: Dias Carneiro

Member of the Chamber of Deputies
- In office 26 June 1962 – 12 October 1992
- Constituency: São Paulo
- In office 11 March 1951 – 11 September 1961
- Constituency: São Paulo

State Deputy of São Paulo
- In office 14 March 1947 – 11 March 1951
- Constituency: At-large
- Born: Ulysses Silveira Guimarães; 6 October 1916; Itirapina, São Paulo, Brazil
- Disappeared: 12 October 1992 (aged 76); Angra dos Reis, Rio de Janeiro, Brazil
- Status: Missing for 34 years and 11 days; declared dead in absentia on 12 October 1992 (aged 76)
- Education: Law School, University of São Paulo (BSS)
- Occupations: Lawyer, politician, professor
- Political party: PSD (1947–1965); MDB (1965–1979); PMDB (1979–1992)
- Spouse: Ida de Almeida Guimarães

Signature
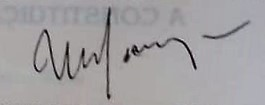

Ulysses Silveira Guimarães (Portuguese pronunciation: [uˈlisis siwˈvejɾɐ ɡimɐˈɾɐ̃js] 6 October 1916 – 12 October 1992) was a Brazilian politician and lawyer who played an important role in opposing the military dictatorship in Brazil and in the fight to restore democracy in the country. He died in a helicopter accident by the shore near Angra dos Reis, in the south of Rio de Janeiro state.

== Biography ==
=== Childhood and youth ===
Ulysses Silveira Guimarães was born in the village of Itaqueri da Serra, today a district of Itirapina, which was then part of Rio Claro, São Paulo State. He had an active academic life, participating in the Centro Acadêmico XI de Agosto (August XI Academic Center) and held the position of vice president of the União Nacional dos Estudantes (National Union of Students). Guimarães studied and graduated with a degree in Law and Social Sciences, at the School of Law of University of São Paulo (USP).

=== Professional life ===
He was a teacher for several years at the Mackenzie University School of Law, where he eventually became Professor of Public International Law. He taught Municipal Law at the Law Faculty of Itu, and Constitutional Law at the Law School of Bauru. He specialized in Tax Law. Ulysses Guimarães worked at Santos Futebol Clube, starting on January 10, 1941. In 1942, he was appointed chief executive of the club's offices in São Paulo, a position he took back in 1945. In 1944, he was elected vice president of the club.

He was elected state deputy for São Paulo, for Constituent Assembly of 1947, by the Social Democratic Party (PSD). Since then, Guimarães was elected for the role of federal deputy for the State for eleven consecutive terms from 1951 to 1995 (not having finished the last term).

Guimarães held the Ministry of Industry and Trade at the office of Tancredo Neves, during the short parliamentary experience in Brazil (1961-1962). He initially welcomed the military takeover of 1964, but soon moved to the opposition. With the introduction of bipartisanship (1965), he joined the Brazilian Democratic Movement, of which he would be vice president and then president. He was president of the Latin American Parliament from 1967 to 1970.

=== Struggle for political opening ===
In 1973, he launched his symbolic "anticandidacy" to the presidency for the 1974 election as a form of repudiation of the military regime, having as running mate the journalist and former governor of Pernambuco, Barbosa Lima Sobrinho. It was the first time during the military era that the MDB even put up a candidate. At the time, the president was indirectly elected by a joint session of Congress. The military's official party, the National Renewal Alliance Party (ARENA), had such a massive majority in both chambers that ARENA's candidate could not possibly be defeated. As expected, Guimarães lost in a landslide to the military candidate, Ernesto Geisel, garnering only 76 votes.

On November 29, 1976, at the Plenary Tiradentes of the Legislative Assembly of São Paulo, he founded OPB - Order of Parliamentarians of Brazil, a class association without partisan, religious or social ties, of which he is patron. Ahead of the party, he has participated in all campaigns for a return to democracy, including the struggle for broad, general and unrestricted amnesty. With the end of bipartisanship (1979), the MDB became Brazilian Democratic Movement Party (PMDB), of which he would be national president.

=== Political activism ===
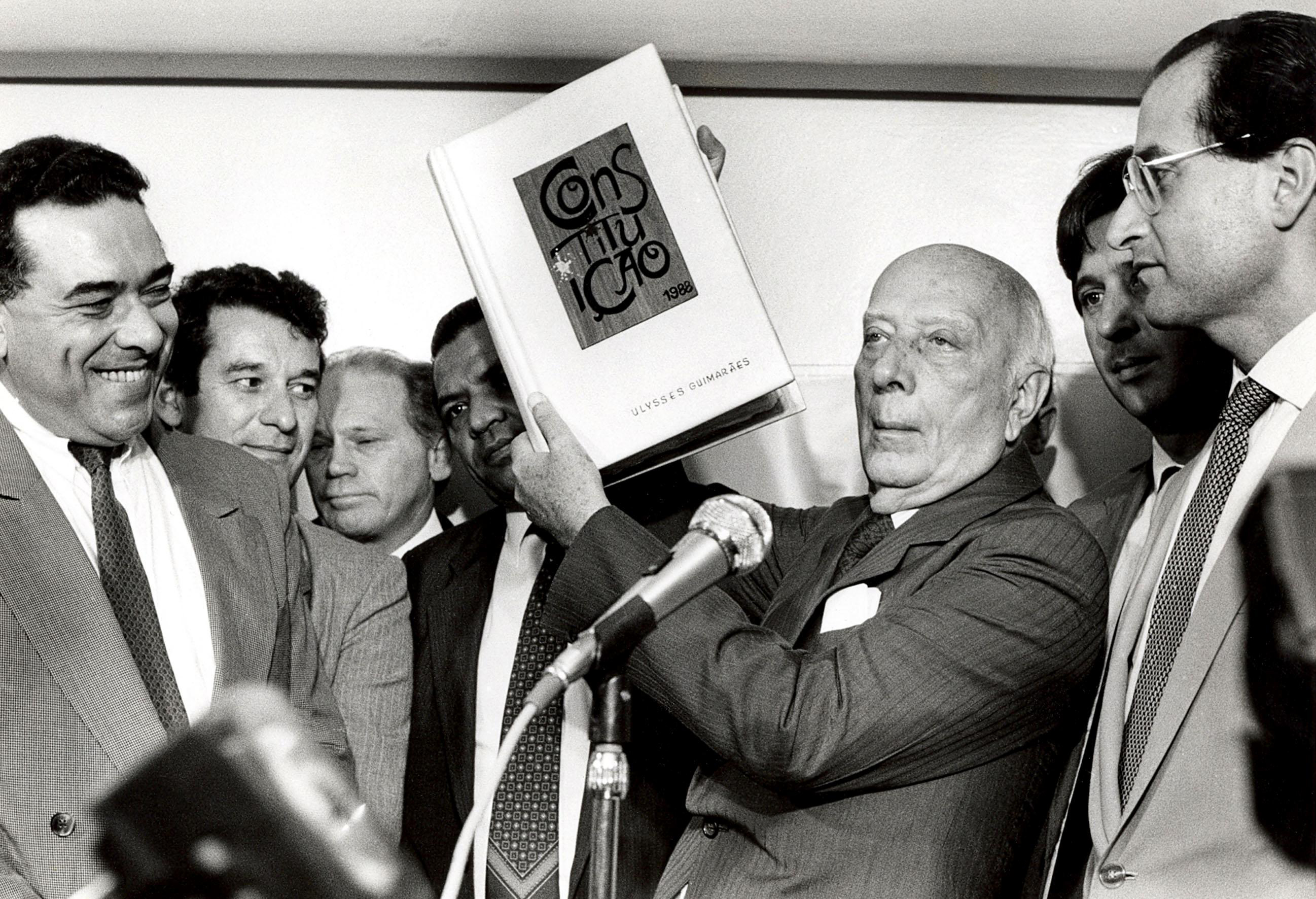
Ulysses Guimarães holding the final draft of the 1988 Constitution.

Together with Tancredo Neves, Orestes Quércia and Franco Montoro, Guimarães led new campaigns by democratization such as direct elections, popularly known by the slogan: Diretas Já. Ulysses Guimarães was almost the candidate for president of the Republic in 1985 by PMDB, when elections were held in the electoral college. The political articulations of the era ultimately led to the election of a "mixed" ticket with Tancredo Neves as PMDB presidential candidate and José Sarney, ex-PDS/Frente Liberal, as running mate.

The Neves/Sarney ticket won in a landslide. However, Neves fell gravely ill in the weeks leading up to his inauguration, and it soon became apparent that he would be too sick to be sworn in as scheduled on March 15. Several politicians argued that Guimarães, who had been elected President of the Chamber of Deputies, should have ascended as acting president. They took the line that Sarney should be sworn in alongside Neves, as he had only been elected vice president by virtue of being Neves' running mate. However, Guimarães himself argued that Sarney should assume office as acting president, since the vice president's main duty was to stand in for the president when necessary. Accordingly, Sarney was sworn in as vice president, and immediately became acting president, formally ascending as president upon Neves' death on April 21.

Guimarães was President of the Chamber of Deputies in three periods (1956-1958, 1985-1987 and 1987–1989), chairing the National Constituent Assembly in 1987–1988. The new constitution, in which he was instrumental, was promulgated on October 5, 1988, and was by him called Citizen Constitution, by the social advances that incorporated in the text. Due to his great popularity, he ran for president for PMDB in the 1989 direct elections, won by Fernando Collor.

=== Death ===
He died in a helicopter crash off the coast of Angra dos Reis, in Rio de Janeiro on October 12, 1992, with his wife D. Mora, former Senator Severo Gomes, his wife and the pilot. The body of Guimarães has never been found.

=== Written works ===
- Vida Exemplar de Prudente de Morais, 1940
- Navegar é preciso, Viver não é preciso, 1973
- Socialização do Direito, 1978
- Esperança e Mudança, 1982
- Tentativa, 1983
- Diretas Já, 1984
- PT Saudações, 1988
- Da Fé fiz Companheira, 1989
- Ou Mudamos ou seremos Mudados, 1991
- Parliamentarismo – Além de ser mais forte, substitui um regime fraco, February 1992.

Political offices
Preceded by Flores da Cunha	President of the Chamber of Deputies; 1956−1958	Succeeded by Ranieri Mazzilli
Preceded by Artur Bernardes Filho	Minister of Industry and Trade; 1961−1962	Succeeded by Dias Carneiro
Preceded by Flávio Marcílio	President of the Chamber of Deputies; 1985−1989	Succeeded by Paes de Andrade
Office established	President of the National Constituent Assembly; 1987−1988	Office abolished
