= Hélio Fernandes =

Brazilian journalist (1921–2021)

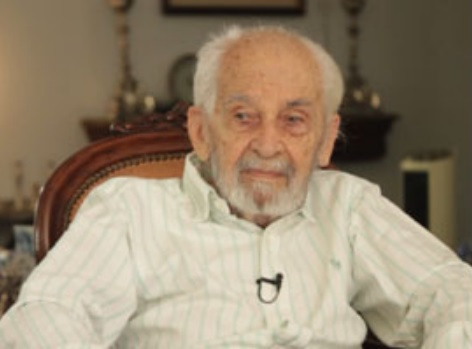
- Fernandes in 2014
- Born: 11 January 1921; Rio de Janeiro, Brazil
- Died: 10 March 2021 (aged 100); Rio de Janeiro, Brazil
- Occupation: Journalist
- Children: Rodolfo Fernandes and Hélio Fernandes Filho

Hélio Fernandes (11 January 1921 – 10 March 2021) was a Brazilian journalist.

He owned the newspaper Tribuna da Imprensa from 1962 until his death. Hélio was the father of journalists Rodolfo Fernandes and Hélio Fernandes Filho and brother of the artist and comedian Millôr Fernandes.

== Biography ==
Hélio Fernandes was born on January 11, 1921, in Rio de Janeiro, Brazil. In 1933, he started working for the O Cruzeiro magazine with his brother Millôr Fernandes and worked for 16 years. He became head of the sports section of the Diario Carioca and then the director of the Manchete after Diario Carioca closed.
