= Tribuna da Imprensa =

Brazilian daily newspaper

- Type: Daily newspaper
- Founder: Carlos Lacerda
- Founded: 27 December 1949; 76 years ago
- Ceased publication: 2009
- Relaunched: 2022
- Headquarters: Rio de Janeiro, Brazil
- Circulation: Rio de Janeiro, Brazil (national edition)
- Website: tribuna.com.br

Tribuna da Imprensa (lit. Press Tribune) is a Brazilian online newspaper and former print publication founded on 27 December 1949 in the state of Rio de Janeiro by journalist Carlos Lacerda.

== History ==
The newspaper's name derives from Lacerda's column Da Tribuna da Imprensa (From the Tribune of the Press), which he wrote for the Correio da Manhã from 1946 to 1949. After being removed from the paper, he retained the rights to the column's name. On 12 August 1954, Lacerda published an editorial in Tribuna da Imprensa urging the military to demand the resignation of President Getúlio Vargas, intensifying the political crisis that led to Vargas's suicide on 24 August. Following Vargas's death, government supporters stormed and ransacked the newspaper's headquarters.

In October 1961, during João Goulart's presidency, Lacerda sold the newspaper to Manuel Francisco do Nascimento Brito (son-in-law of Pereira Carneiro, owner of the Jornal do Brasil) for 10 million dollars due to financial difficulties. By late 1962, journalist Hélio Fernandes assumed the newspaper's assets and liabilities, claiming he paid nothing for the acquisition but relieved Brito of ongoing losses. During the 1964 Brazilian coup d'état, the paper published on 2 April 1964:

"Expelled, gagged, and cowardly, Mr. João Belchior Marques Goulart, infamous leader of communist-careerist-syndicalist negotiators, left power as demanded by the legitimate will of the people. One of the greatest thieves in Brazilian history, Mr. João Goulart now enters history also as one of its greatest cowards."

— Tribuna da Imprensa

From June 1968 to June 1978, the newspaper underwent pre-publication censorship under Brazil's military regime. It faced over 20 seizures, had censors stationed in its offices for a decade, and its owner was imprisoned for six days in 1973.

On 26 March 1981, a group of armed and hooded men stormed the offices of the newspaper's headquarters on Rua do Lavradio and detonated six bombs, destroying part of the building and its printing presses. The attack was another episode of repression against media outlets critical of the military dictatorship.

In 2001, the newspaper faced bankruptcy and closure after failing to pay moral damages awarded to judge Paulo César Salomão. The ruling stemmed from a 1994 article titled "O crime ao amparo da lei" ("Crime Under Legal Protection") by economist Romero da Costa Machado (not a staff member), which referred to Salomão as "PC Salomão", which was taken as a reference to Fernando Collor campaign treasurer Paulo Cesar Farias. It was shut down on 3 May following a court order. Initially, the editors planned to print the newspaper elsewhere but eventually decided against this so as to comply with the courts. Tribuna da Imprensa reopened on 8 May when its injunction was lifted after payment of the damages to Salomão. Tribuna da Imprensa ceased print publication in December 2008, and continued operating as a website until February 2009. In digital form, the website was relaunched in the second half of 2022.

== See also ==
- Carlos Lacerda
- Fourth Brazilian Republic
- Military dictatorship in Brazil
