= 1960 Brazilian presidential election =

- 3 October 1960
- President
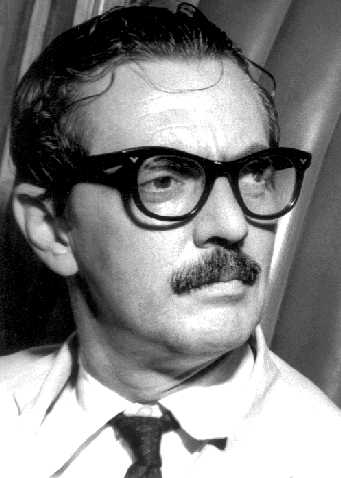

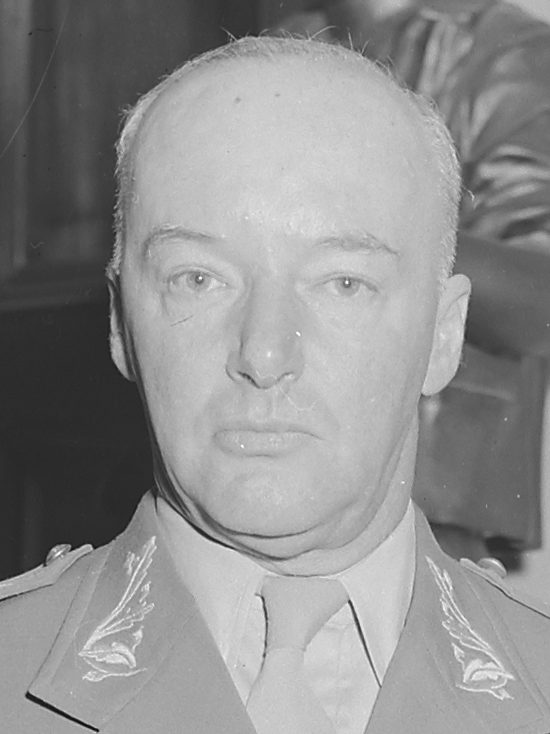

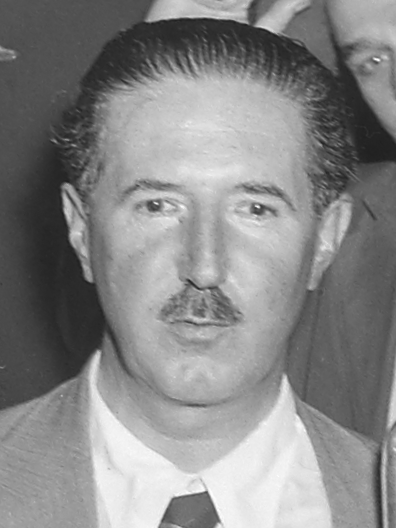
Candidate	Jânio Quadros	Henrique Lott	Adhemar de Barros
Party	PTN	PSD	PSP
Popular vote	5,636,623	3,846,825	2,195,709
Percentage	48.26%	32.94%	18.8%
- Results by state
President before election
Juscelino Kubitschek
PSD
Elected President
Jânio Quadros
PTN
- Vice president

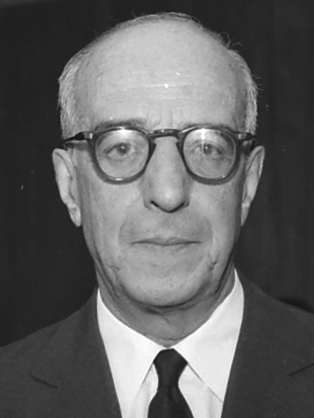

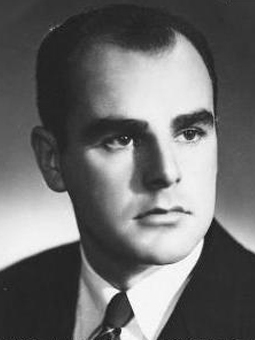
Candidate	João Goulart	Milton Campos	Fernando Ferrari
Party	PTB	UDN	PDC
Popular vote	4,547,010	4,237,719	2,137,385
Percentage	41.63%	38.8%	19.57%
Vice President before election
João Goulart
PTB
Elected Vice President
João Goulart
PTB

Presidential elections were held in Brazil on 3 October 1960 to elect the president and vice president. Jânio Quadros of the National Labour Party (PTN), heading a coalition of the PTN, the National Democratic Union and the Christian Democratic Party was elected president with 48% of the vote. João Goulart, backed by a coalition of the Brazilian Labour Party, Social Democratic Party, Social Labour Party, Brazilian Socialist Party and Labour Republican Party, was elected vice president with 42% of the vote. Voter turnout was 81%.

Quadros' victory was the largest of any free election in Brazilian history at the time; the 16 percent margin of victory would remain a record until Fernando Henrique Cardoso won by 27 points in 1994. The election marked the first time in 31 years that the presidency had not been won by an heir to the legacy of Getúlio Vargas.

This would be the last direct presidential election held in Brazil until 1989.

== Results ==
=== President ===
Candidate	Party	Votes	%
Jânio Quadros	PTN–UDN–PDC	5,636,623	48.26
Henrique Teixeira Lott	PSD–PTB	3,846,825	32.94
Adhemar de Barros	Social Progressive Party	2,195,709	18.80
Total		11,679,157	100.00
Valid votes		11,679,157	92.79
Invalid/blank votes		907,197	7.21
Total votes		12,586,354	100.00
Registered voters/turnout		15,543,332	80.98
Source: Nohlen, TRE-PB

=== Vice president ===
Candidate	Party	Votes	%
João Goulart	PTB–PSD–PST–PSB–PRT	4,547,010	41.63
Milton Campos	UDN–PR–PL–PTN	4,237,719	38.80
Fernando Ferrari	MTR–PDC	2,137,382	19.57
Total		10,922,111	100.00
Valid votes		10,922,111	86.78
Invalid/blank votes		1,664,243	13.22
Total votes		12,586,354	100.00
Registered voters/turnout		15,543,332	80.98
