= Reis Veloso =

Brazilian economist and politician (1931–2019)

- Veloso in 1974

Minister of Planning
- In office 31 October 1969 – 15 March 1979
- President: Emílio Garrastazu Médici; Ernesto Geisel
- Preceded by: Hélio Beltrão
- Succeeded by: Mário Henrique Simonsen

Personal details
- Born: 12 July 1931 Parnaíba, Piauí, Brazil
- Died: 19 January 2019 (aged 87) Rio de Janeiro, Brazil

João Paulo dos Reis Veloso (12 July 1931 – 19 February 2019) was a Brazilian economist and politician who served as Minister of Planning between 1969 and 1979, and also as President of the Institute of Applied Economic Research.
