= 1974 Brazilian presidential election =

- 15 January 1974

503 members of the electoral college 252 electoral votes needed to win

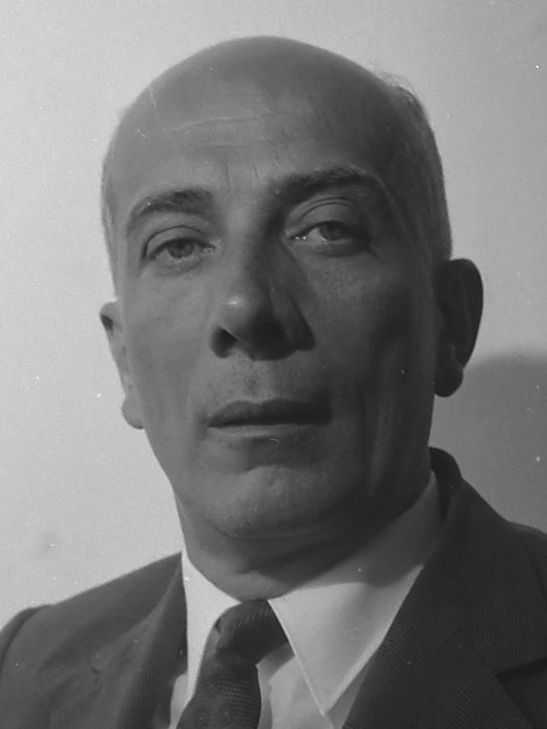
Candidate	Ernesto Geisel	Ulysses Guimarães
Party	ARENA	MDB
Running mate	Adalberto Pereira	Barbosa Lima Sobrinho
Electoral vote	400	76
Percentage	84.03%	15.97%
President before election
Emílio Garrastazu Médici
ARENA
Elected President
Ernesto Geisel
ARENA

Indirect presidential elections were held in Brazil on 15 January 1974. They were the fourth presidential elections held under the military government and were carried out through an electoral college.

== Background ==
All elections during the military government elected candidates from the National Renewal Alliance Party (ARENA), though the 1966 and 1969 were one-party elections. In other elections during the military government, there were two parties running for elections.

== Candidates ==
The candidatures were defined in September 1973, on party conventions. The first defined were from the ARENA on day 14 and 15, when Ernesto Geisel was chosen as president candidate, and Adalberto Pereira dos Santos as vice-president.

The Brazilian Democratic Movement (MDB) chose its candidates on day 22, when they chose Ulysses Guimarães and Barbosa Lima Sobrinho with 201 votes. The MDB president declared that "with no popular vote, all solutions chosen will be from the ruling party".

== Results ==
Candidate	Running mate	Party	Votes	%
Ernesto Geisel	Adalberto Pereira	National Renewal Alliance	400	84.03
Ulysses Guimarães	Barbosa Lima Sobrinho	Brazilian Democratic Movement	76	15.97
Total			476	100.00
Total votes			476	–
Registered voters/turnout			503	94.63
Source: Folha de S.Paulo
