= Mário Henrique Simonsen =

Minister of Finance
- In office 15 March 1974 – 15 March 1979
- President: Ernesto Geisel
- Preceded by: José Flávio Pécora
- Succeeded by: Karlos Rischbieter

Minister of Planning
- In office 15 March 1979 – 10 August 1979
- President: João Figueiredo
- Preceded by: Reis Veloso
- Succeeded by: Golbery do Couto e Silva

Personal details
- Born: 19 February 1935 Rio de Janeiro, Federal District, Brazil
- Died: 9 February 1997 (aged 61) Rio de Janeiro, Brazil
- Profession: Engineer, banker, economist

Mário Henrique Simonsen (19 February 1935 – 9 February 1997) was a Brazilian economist, who served as Brazil's finance minister from 1974 to 1979.

Simonsen was appointed Brazil's finance minister by President Ernesto Geisel with instructions to reduce the country's runaway inflation rate.

Despite Simonsen's efforts, the official inflation rate had risen to 40% per annum in 1979 and he was shifted to Planning Minister.

He was succeeded by Antonio Delfim Netto, with whom he had an uneasy relationship due to the latter's inclination to increase borrowing, and hence inflation.

Simonsen resigned from Cabinet in 1980 and became a director of Citicorp, a position he held until 1995 when he was forced by ill-health to retire. He was a chronic heavy smoker and suffered from emphysema. Simonsen expressed public support for the return of the Brazilian Monarchy.

== Other interests ==
Simonsen was an excellent baritone and an opera aficionado.

== Family ==
He was married to Iluska Pereira da Cunha Simonsen. Thy had two sons and a daughter.

== See also ==
- Portuguese Wikipedia entry

Political offices
Preceded by José Flávio Pécora	Minister of Finance; 1974–1979	Succeeded by Karlos Rischbieter
Preceded by Reis Veloso	Minister of Planning; 1979	Succeeded by Golbery do Couto e Silva
