= Barbosa Lima Sobrinho =

Brazilian writer and historian (1897–2000)

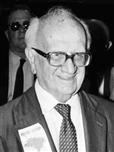
- vice–president candidate, 1974
- Born: Alexandre José Barbosa Lima Sobrinho; January 22, 1897; Recife, Brazil
- Died: July 16, 2000 (aged 103); Rio de Janeiro, Brazil
- Occupations: Lawyer; writer; historian; essayist; journalist; politician
- Known for: Candidate for the Vice President of Brazil for the 1974 Brazilian presidential election
- Political party: Brazilian Democratic Movement

Alexandre José Barbosa Lima Sobrinho (January 22, 1897 – July 16, 2000) was a Brazilian lawyer, writer, historian, essayist, journalist and politician.

Sobrinho was born in Recife on January 22, 1897. In 1917 he graduated in law and social sciences in Recife. In 1926 he published his first book and was elected president of the Brazilian Press Association. He was a member of the Brazilian Academy of Letters since 1937 and, at the end of the 1990s, appeared in the Guinness World Records as the oldest active journalist in the world. Author of over 70 books, he died in 2000 at the age of 103.
