= 1966 Brazilian presidential election =

- 3 October 1966

471 members of the electoral college 236 electoral votes needed to win
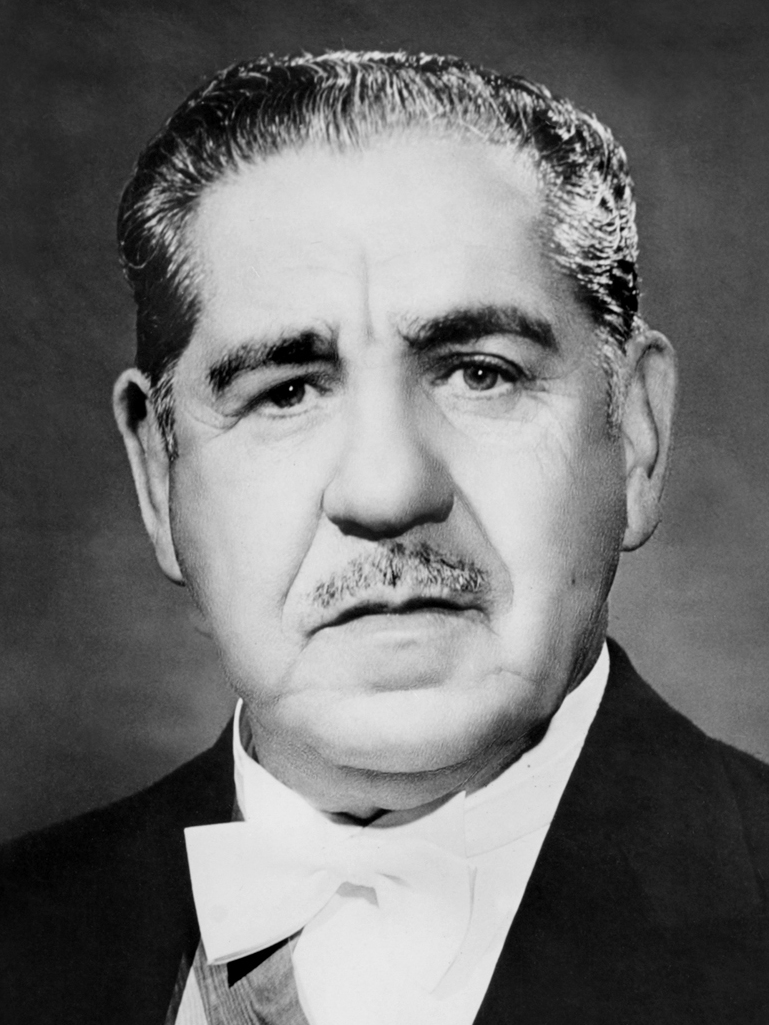
Candidate	Artur da Costa e Silva
Party	ARENA
Running mate	Pedro Aleixo
Electoral vote	294
Percentage	100%
President before election
Castelo Branco
ARENA
Elected President
Artur da Costa e Silva
ARENA

Indirect presidential elections were held in Brazil on 3 October 1966 through an electoral college system. It was the second election during the Brazilian military government, with Artur da Costa e Silva as the sole candidate. Costa e Silva was elected with 294 votes from the ruling National Renewal Alliance Party (ARENA).

== Background ==
Presidential elections had been scheduled for 3 October 1965. However, nine days after the Congress declared the vacancy of the Presidency, the Castelo Branco government published on 27 October 1965 Institutional Act no. 2 which, among its attributions, defined that the next President would be chosen by the National Congress with a maximum of two candidates contesting. Therefore, Castelo Branco, who was supposed to govern temporarily until 31 January 1966, extended his term until 15 March 1967, when the new president would replace him.

There had been five pre-candidacies for the election scheduled for 1964: former president Juscelino Kubitschek with the slogan "JK-65, the time of agriculture" (Portuguese: JK-65, a vez da agricultura), governor of Guanabara Carlos Lacerda, former governor of Rio Grande do Sul Leonel Brizola, former president Jânio Quadros and then-governor of Pernambuco Miguel Arraes. All candidacies were aborted and the election never occurred.

Following various cessations of political rights, politicians including Kubitschek, Lacerda, Quadros and Adhemar de Barros were proscribed after allegations of conspiracy and corruption. Once again, the National Congress of Brazil elected the president. The vice-presidential candidacy was linked to the candidacy of the presidency. Only two political parties were legal at the time. However, the opposition party did not put forward a candidate.

== Results ==
Candidate	Running mate	Party	Votes	%
Artur da Costa e Silva	Pedro Aleixo	National Renewal Alliance	294	100.00
Total			294	100.00
Total votes			294	–
Registered voters/turnout			471	62.42
