= Empire of Brazil =

Monarchy in South America (1822–1889)

Coordinates: 22°54′13″S 43°10′27″W

Empire of Brazil Império do Brasil
- 1822–1889
- Flag Coat of arms
- Motto: Independência ou Morte! (Portuguese) "Independence or Death!"
- Anthem: Hino da Independência "Independence Anthem" (1822–1831/de facto 1889) Hino Nacional Brasileiro "Brazilian National Anthem" (from 1831)
- Lesser Arms

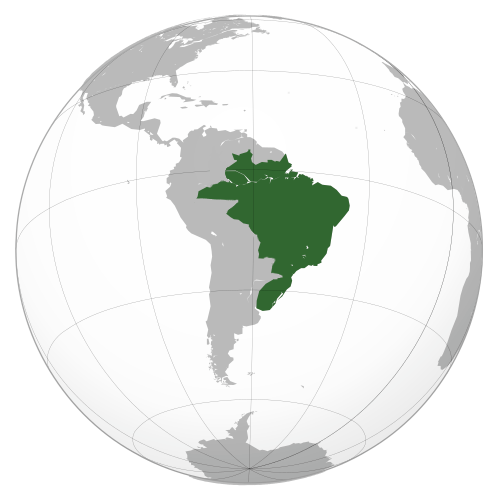
- The Empire of Brazil in 1822, including former Cisplatina province
- Capital: Rio de Janeiro
- Common languages: Portuguese
- Ethnic groups (1872): 38.3% Pardo; 38.1% White; 19.7% Black; 3.9% Indigenous/Caboclo
- Religion: Roman Catholicism
- Demonym: Brazilians
- Government: Unitary parliamentary constitutional monarchy
- Emperor
  - 1822–1831: Pedro I
  - 1831–1889: Pedro II
- Prime Minister
  - 1843–1844 (de facto): Marquis of Paraná
  - 1847–1848 (first): 2nd Viscount of Caravelas
  - 1889 (last): Viscount of Ouro Preto
- Legislature: General Assembly
  - Upper house: Senate
  - Lower house: Chamber of Deputies
- History
  - Independence: 7 September 1822
  - Accession of Pedro I: 12 October 1822
  - Constitution of 1824: 25 March 1824
  - Regency period: 7 April 1831
  - Accession of Pedro II: 23 July 1840
  - Abolition of slavery: 13 May 1888
  - Monarchy abolished: 15 November 1889

Area
- 1889: 8,337,218 km^{2} (3,219,018 sq mi)

Population
  - 1823: 4,000,000
  - 1854: 7,000,700
  - 1872: 9,930,478
  - 1890: 14,333,915
- Currency: Real
Preceded by	Succeeded by
United Kingdom of Portugal, Brazil and the Algarves; Kingdom of Brazil	First Brazilian Republic; Uruguay
- Today part of: Brazil; Uruguay

The Empire of Brazil (Portuguese: Império do Brasil) was a 19th-century state that broadly comprised the territories which form modern Brazil and Uruguay until the latter achieved independence in 1828. The empire's government was a representative parliamentary constitutional monarchy under the rule of Emperors Pedro I and his son Pedro II. A colony of the Kingdom of Portugal, Brazil became the seat of the Portuguese Empire in 1808, when the Portuguese Prince regent, later King Dom John VI, fled from Napoleon's invasion of Portugal and established himself and his government in the Brazilian city of Rio de Janeiro. John VI later returned to Portugal, leaving his eldest son and heir-apparent, Pedro, to rule the Kingdom of Brazil as regent. On 7 September 1822, Pedro declared the independence of Brazil and, after waging a war against his father's kingdom, was acclaimed on 12 October as Pedro I, the first Emperor of Brazil. The new country was vast, sparsely populated, and ethnically diverse.

Unlike most of the neighboring Hispanic American republics, Brazil had political stability, vibrant economic growth, constitutionally guaranteed freedom of speech, and respect for civil rights of its subjects, albeit with legal restrictions on women and slaves, the latter regarded as property and not citizens. The Empire's bicameral parliament was elected under comparatively democratic methods for the era, as were the provincial and local legislatures. This led to a long ideological conflict between Pedro I and a sizable parliamentary faction over the role of the monarch in the government. He also had to face other obstacles. The unsuccessful Cisplatine War against the neighboring United Provinces of the Río de la Plata in 1828 led to the secession of the province of Cisplatina (later to become Uruguay). In 1826, despite his role in Brazilian independence, he became the king of Portugal; he abdicated the Portuguese throne in favor of Maria, his eldest daughter. Two years later, she was usurped by Pedro I's younger brother Miguel. Unable to deal with both Brazilian and Portuguese affairs, Pedro I abdicated his Brazilian throne on 7 April 1831 and immediately departed for Europe to restore his daughter to the Portuguese throne.

Pedro I's successor in Brazil was his five-year-old son, Pedro II. As the latter was still a minor, a weak regency was created. The power vacuum resulting from the absence of a ruling monarch as the ultimate arbiter in political disputes led to regional civil wars between local factions. Having inherited an empire on the verge of disintegration, Pedro II, once he was legally declared of age, managed to bring peace and stability to the country, which eventually became an emerging international power. Brazil was victorious in three international conflicts (the Platine War, the Uruguayan War, and the Paraguayan War) under Pedro II's rule, and the Empire prevailed in several other international disputes and outbreaks of domestic strife. With prosperity and economic development came an influx of European immigration, including Protestants and Jews, although Brazil remained mostly Catholic. Slavery, which had initially been widespread, was restricted by successive legislation until its final abolition in 1888. Brazilian visual arts, literature and theater developed during this time of progress. Although heavily influenced by European styles that ranged from Neoclassicism to Romanticism, each concept was adapted to create a culture that was uniquely Brazilian.

Even though the last four decades of Pedro II's reign were marked by continuous internal peace and economic prosperity, he had no desire to see the monarchy survive beyond his lifetime and made no effort to maintain support for the institution. The next in line to the throne was his daughter Isabel, but neither Pedro II nor the ruling classes considered a female monarch acceptable. Lacking any viable heir, the Empire's political leaders saw no reason to defend the monarchy. After a 58-year reign, on 15 November 1889 the Emperor was overthrown in a sudden coup d'état led by a clique of military leaders whose goal was the formation of a republic headed by a dictator, forming the First Brazilian Republic.

== History ==
=== Independence and early years ===
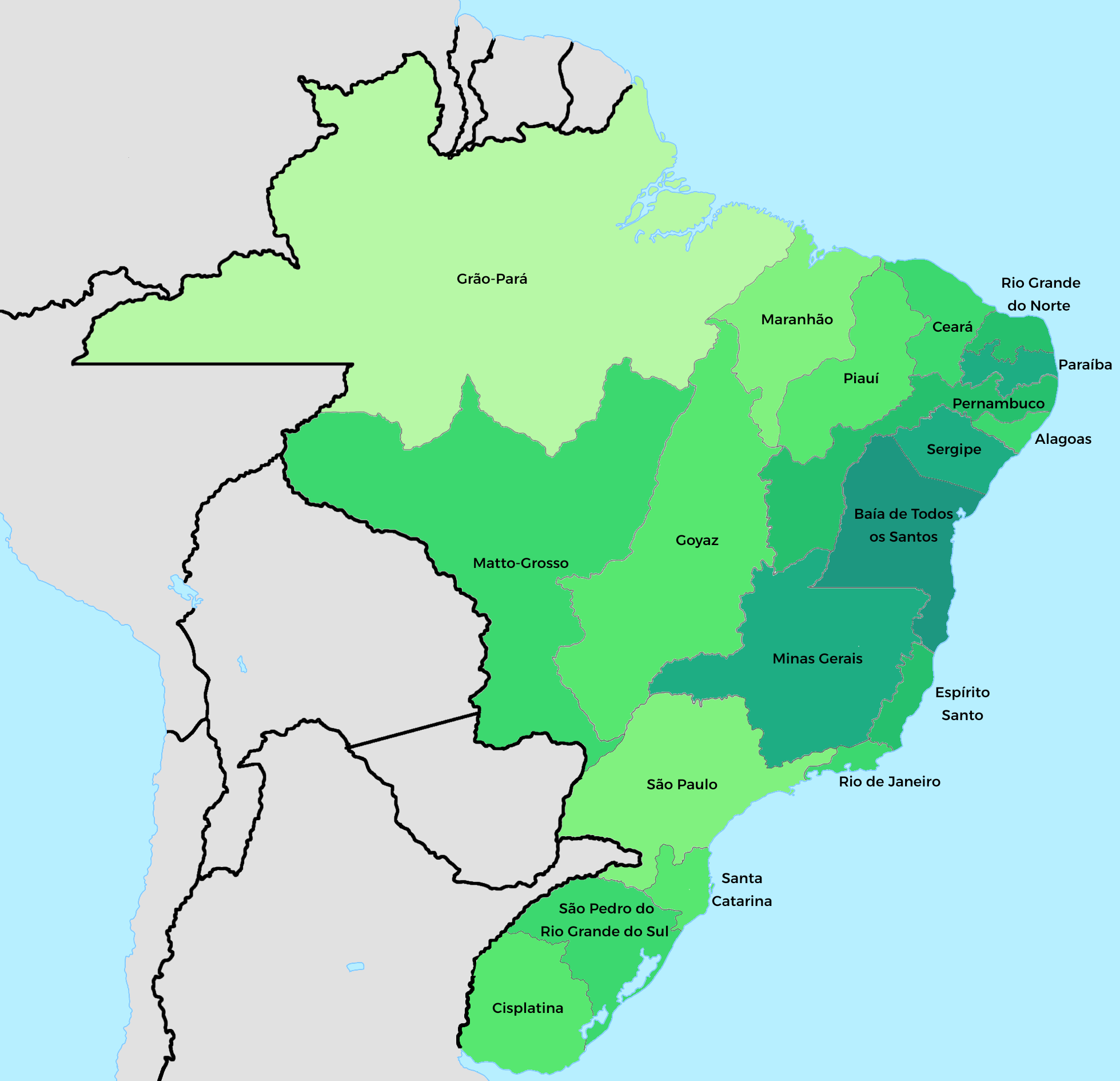
The Empire of Brazil. A map showing the Empire and its provinces

The territory which would come to be known as Brazil was claimed by Portugal on 22 April 1500, when the navigator Pedro Álvares Cabral landed on its coast. Permanent settlement followed in 1532, and for the next 300 years the Portuguese slowly expanded westwards until they had reached nearly all of the borders of modern Brazil. In 1808, the army of French Emperor Napoleon I invaded Portugal, forcing the Portuguese royal family—the House of Braganza, a branch of the thousand-year-old Capetian dynasty—into exile. They re-established themselves in the Brazilian city of Rio de Janeiro, which became the unofficial seat of the Portuguese Empire.

In 1815, the Portuguese crown prince Dom John (later Dom John VI), acting as regent, created the United Kingdom of Portugal, Brazil and the Algarves, which raised the status of Brazil from colony to kingdom. He ascended the Portuguese throne the following year, after the death of his mother, Maria I of Portugal. He returned to Portugal in April 1821, leaving behind his son and heir, Prince Dom Pedro, to rule Brazil as his regent. The Portuguese government immediately moved to revoke the political autonomy that Brazil had been granted since 1808. The threat of losing their limited control over local affairs ignited widespread opposition among Brazilians. José Bonifácio de Andrada, along with other Brazilian leaders, convinced Pedro to declare Brazil's independence from Portugal on 7 September 1822. On 12 October, the prince was acclaimed Pedro I, first Emperor of the newly created Empire of Brazil, a constitutional monarchy. The declaration of independence was opposed throughout Brazil by armed military units loyal to Portugal. The ensuing war of independence was fought across the country, with battles in the northern, northeastern, and southern regions. The last Portuguese soldiers to surrender did so in March 1824, and independence was recognized by Portugal in August 1825.

Pedro I encountered a number of crises during his reign. A secessionist rebellion in the Cisplatina Province in early 1825 and the subsequent attempt by the United Provinces of the Río de la Plata (later Argentina) to annex Cisplatina led the Empire into the Cisplatine War: "a long, inglorious, and ultimately futile war in the south". In March 1826, John VI died and Pedro I inherited the Portuguese crown, briefly becoming King Pedro IV of Portugal before abdicating in favor of his eldest daughter, Maria II. The situation worsened in 1828 when the war in the south ended with Brazil's loss of Cisplatina, which would become the independent republic of Uruguay. During the same year in Lisbon, Maria II's throne was usurped by Prince Miguel, Pedro I's younger brother.

Other difficulties arose when the Empire's parliament, the General Assembly, opened in 1826. Pedro I, along with a significant percentage of the legislature, argued for an independent judiciary, a popularly elected legislature and a government which would be led by the emperor who held broad executive powers and prerogatives. Others in parliament argued for a similar structure, only with a less influential role for the monarch and the legislative branch being dominant in policy and governance. The struggle over whether the government would be dominated by the emperor or by the parliament was carried over into debates from 1826 to 1831 on the establishment of the governmental and political structure. Unable to deal with the problems in both Brazil and Portugal simultaneously, the Emperor abdicated on behalf of his son, Pedro II, on 7 April 1831 and immediately sailed for Europe to restore his daughter to her throne.

=== Chaos ===
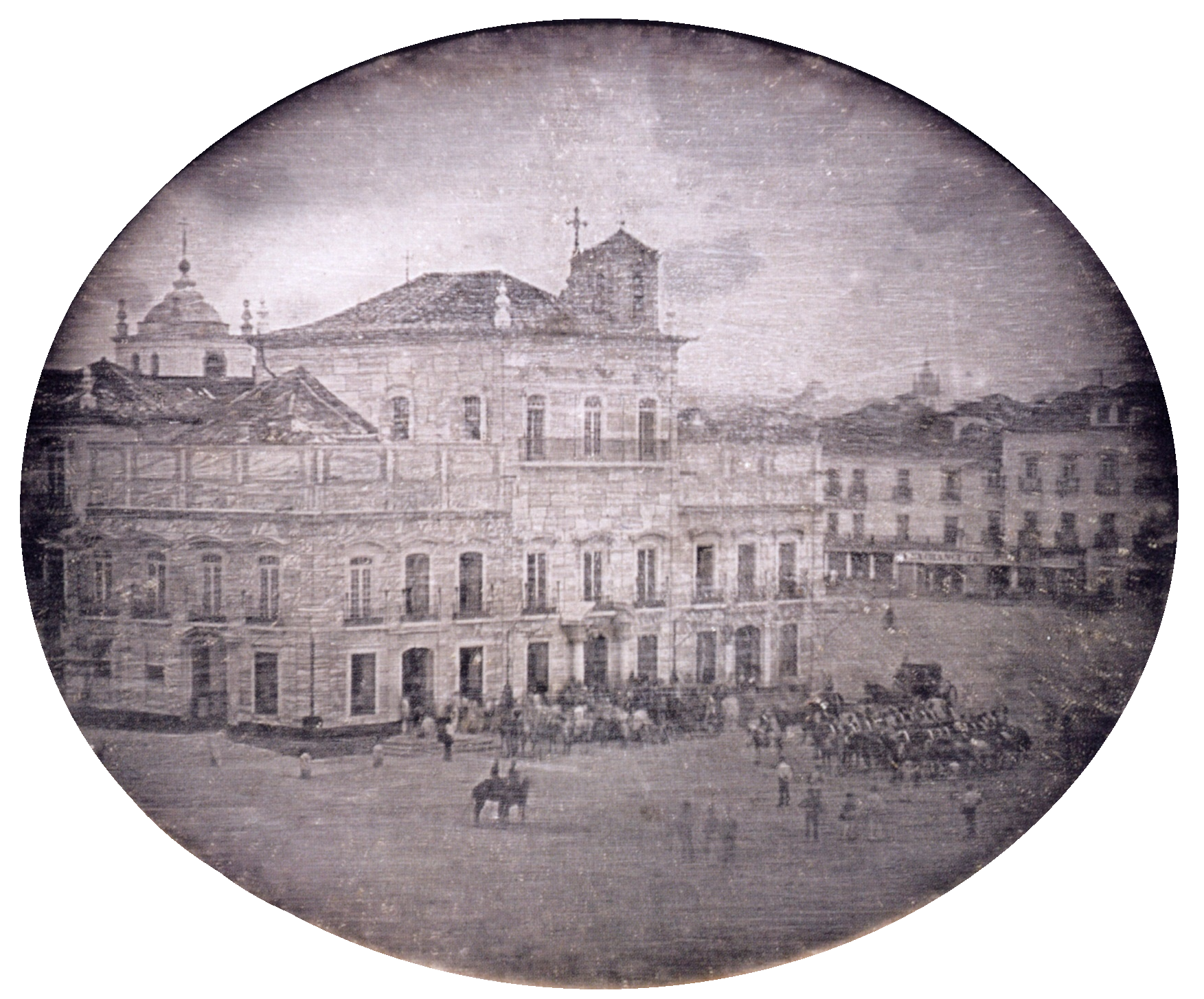
The Paço Imperial in Rio de Janeiro, seat of the Brazilian government (1840)

Following the hasty departure of Pedro I, Brazil was left with a five-year-old boy as head of state. With no precedent to follow, the Empire was faced with the prospect of a period of more than twelve years without a strong executive, as, under the constitution, Pedro II would not attain his majority and begin exercising authority as Emperor until 2 December 1843. A regency was elected to rule the country in the interim. Because the Regency held few of the powers exercised by an emperor and was completely subordinated to the General Assembly, it could not fill the vacuum at the apex of Brazil's government.

The hamstrung Regency proved unable to resolve disputes and rivalries between national and local political factions. Believing that granting provincial and local governments greater autonomy would quell the growing dissent, the General Assembly passed a constitutional amendment in 1834, called the Ato Adicional (Additional Act). Instead of ending the chaos, these new powers only fed local ambitions and rivalries. Violence erupted throughout the country. Local parties competed with renewed ferocity to dominate provincial and municipal governments, as whichever party dominated the provinces would also gain control over the electoral and political system. Those parties which lost elections rebelled and tried to assume power by force, resulting in several rebellions.

The politicians who had risen to power during the 1830s had by then become familiar with the difficulties and pitfalls of power. According to historian Roderick J. Barman, by 1840, "they had lost all faith in their ability to rule the country on their own. They accepted Pedro II as an authority figure whose presence was indispensable for the country's survival." Some of these politicians (who would form the Conservative Party in the 1840s) believed that a neutral figure was required—one who could stand above political factions and petty interests to address discontent and moderate disputes. They envisioned an emperor who was more dependent on the legislature than the constitutional monarch envisioned by Pedro I, yet with greater powers than had been advocated at the beginning of the Regency by their rivals (who later formed the Liberal Party). The liberals, however, contrived to pass an initiative to lower Pedro II's age of majority from eighteen to fourteen. The Emperor was declared fit to rule in July 1840.

=== Consolidation ===
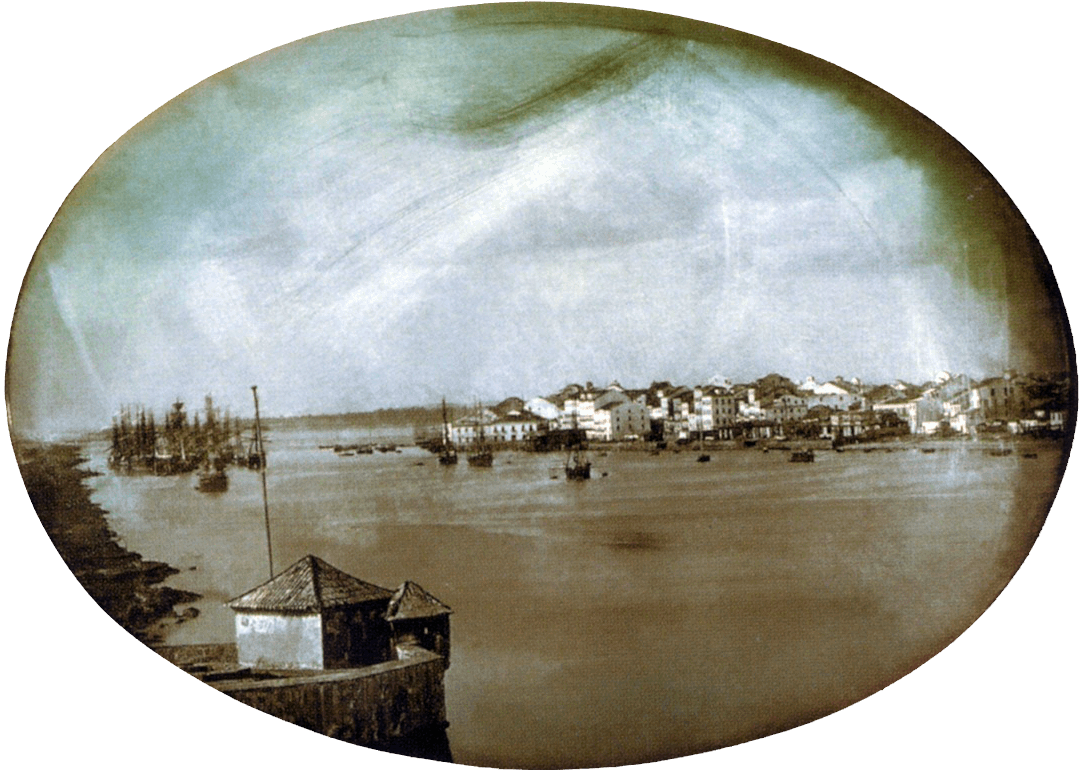
Recife, capital of Pernambuco (Brazilian northeast), two years after the end of the Praieira revolt

To achieve their goals, the liberals allied themselves with a group of high-ranking palace servants and notable politicians: the "Courtier Faction". The courtiers were part of the Emperor's inner circle and had established influence over him, which enabled the appointment of successive liberal-courtier cabinets. Their dominance, however, was short-lived. By 1846, Pedro II had matured physically and mentally. No longer an insecure 14-year-old swayed by gossip, suggestions of secret plots, and other manipulative tactics, the young emperor's weaknesses faded and his strength of character came to the fore. He successfully engineered the end of the courtiers' influence by removing them from his inner circle without causing any public disruption. He also dismissed the liberals, who had proved ineffective while in office, and called on the conservatives to form a government in 1848.

The abilities of the Emperor and the newly appointed conservative cabinet were tested by three crises between 1848 and 1852. The first crisis was a confrontation over the illegal importation of slaves. Importing slaves had been banned in 1826 as part of a treaty with Britain. Trafficking continued unabated, however, and the British government's passage of the Slave Trade (Brazil) Act 1845 (8 & 9 Vict. c. 122) authorized British warships to board Brazilian ships and seize anyone who was found to be involved in the slave trade. While Brazil grappled with this problem, the Praieira revolt, a conflict between local political factions within Pernambuco province (and one in which liberal and courtier supporters were involved), erupted on 6 November 1848, but was suppressed by March 1849. It was the last rebellion to occur during the monarchy, and its end marked the beginning of forty years of internal peace in Brazil. The Eusébio de Queirós Law was promulgated on 4 September 1850 giving the government broad authority to combat the illegal slave trade. With this new tool Brazil moved to eliminate the importation of slaves, and by 1852 this first crisis was over, with Britain accepting that the trade had been suppressed.

The third crisis was a conflict with the Argentine Confederation over ascendancy in territories adjacent to the Río de la Plata and free navigation of that waterway. Since the 1830s, Argentine dictator Juan Manuel de Rosas had supported rebellions within Uruguay and Brazil. The Empire was unable to address the threat posed by Rosas until 1850, when an alliance was forged between Brazil, Uruguay and disaffected Argentines, leading to the Platine War and the subsequent overthrow of the Argentine ruler in February 1852. The Empire's successful navigation of these crises considerably enhanced the nation's stability and prestige, and Brazil emerged as a hemispheric power. Internationally, Europeans came to see the country as embodying familiar liberal ideals, such as freedom of the press and constitutional respect for civil liberties. Its representative parliamentary monarchy also stood in stark contrast to the mix of dictatorships and instability endemic in the other nations of South America during this period.

=== Growth ===
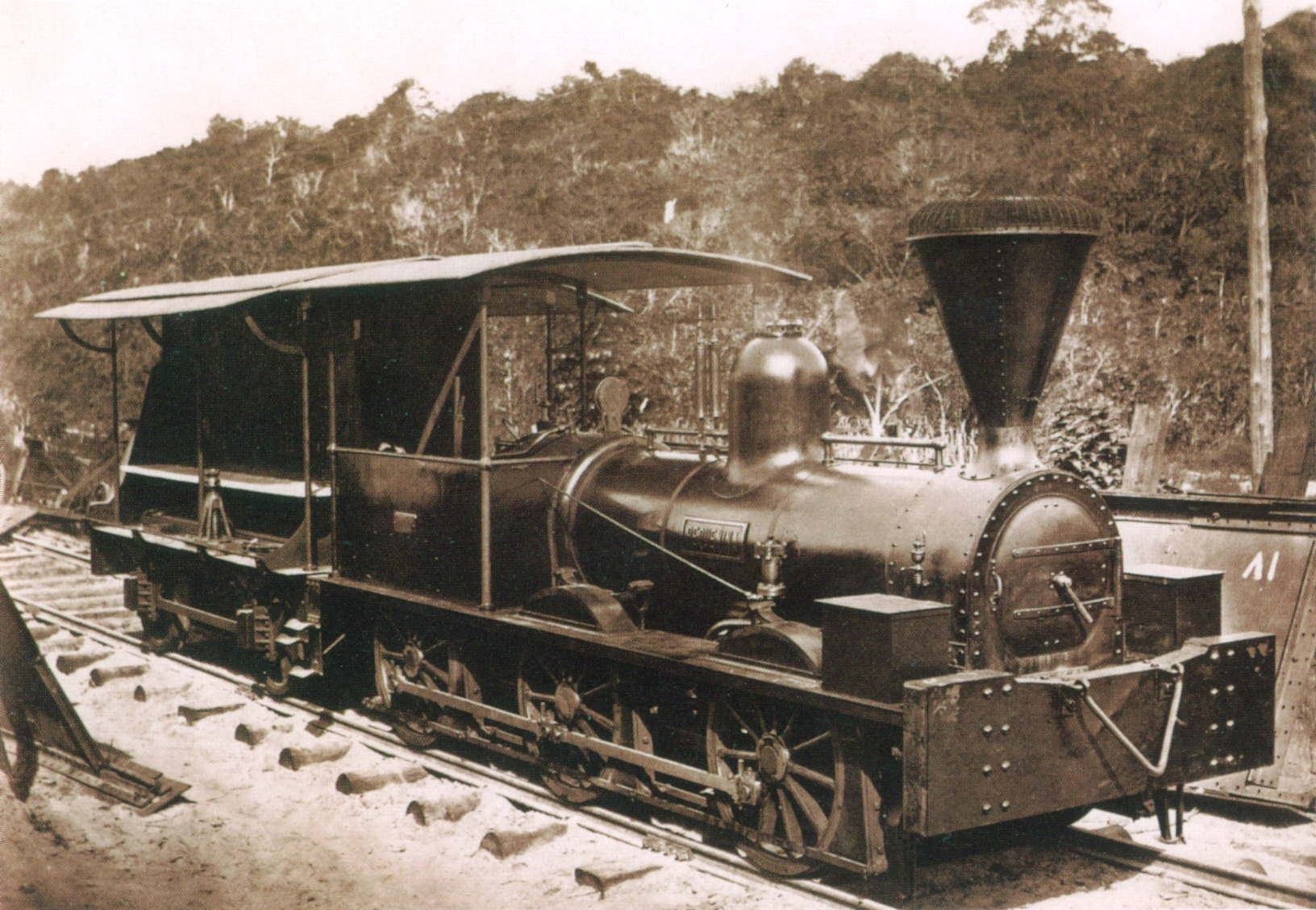
A locomotive in Bahia province (Brazilian northeast), c. 1859

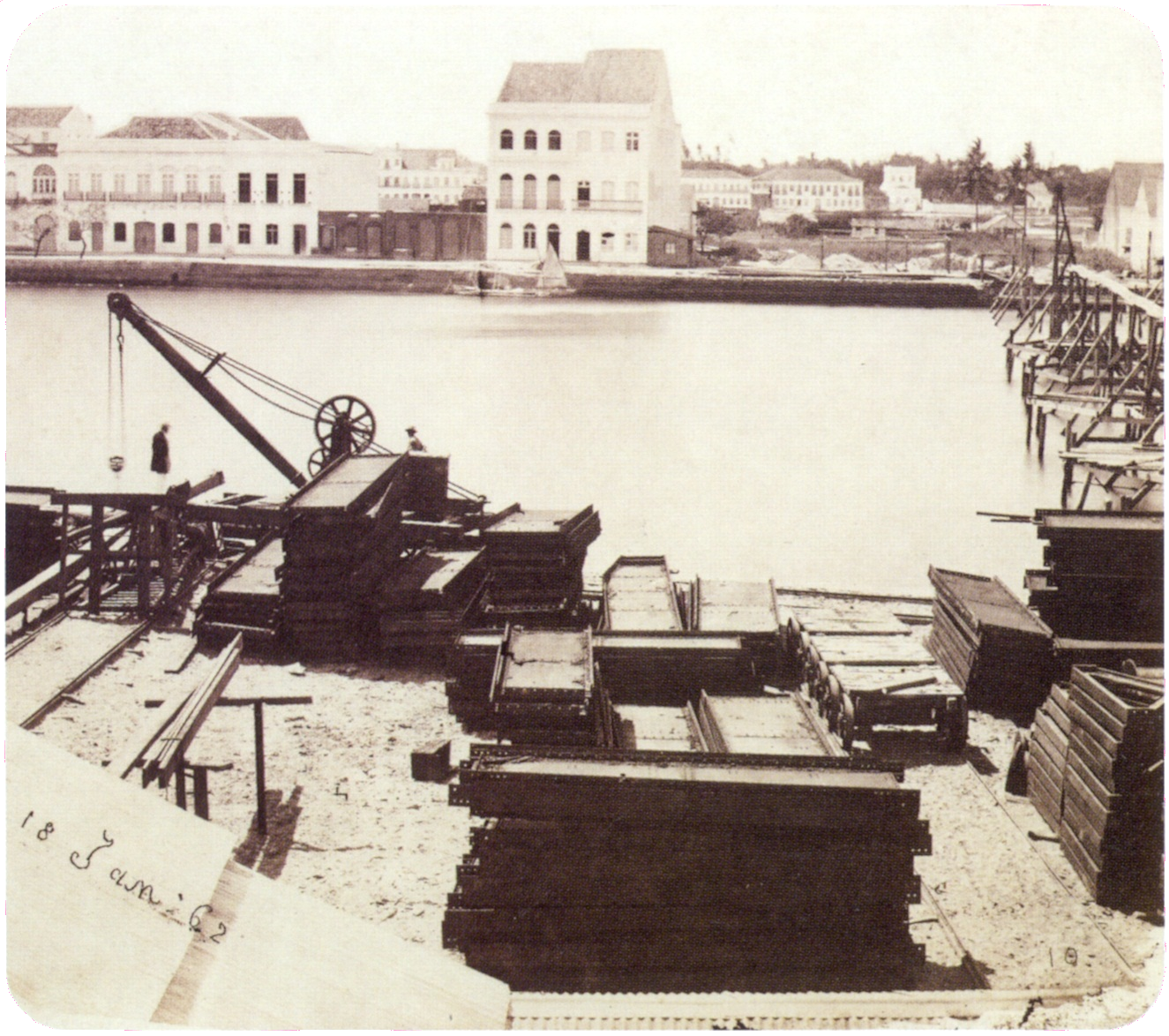
A construction site in the docks of Recife, 1862

At the beginning of the 1850s, Brazil was enjoying internal stability and economic prosperity. The nation's infrastructure was being developed, with progress in the construction of railroads, the electric telegraph and steamship lines uniting Brazil into a cohesive national entity. After five years in office, the successful conservative cabinet was dismissed and in September 1853, Honório Hermeto Carneiro Leão, Marquis of Paraná, head of the Conservative Party, was charged with forming a new cabinet. Emperor Pedro II wanted to advance an ambitious plan, which became known as "the Conciliation", aimed at strengthening the parliament's role in settling the country's political disputes.

Paraná invited several liberals to join the conservative ranks and went so far as to name some as ministers. The new cabinet, although highly successful, was plagued from the start by strong opposition from ultraconservative members of the Conservative Party who repudiated the new liberal recruits. They believed that the cabinet had become a political machine infested with converted liberals who did not genuinely share the party's ideals and were primarily interested in gaining public offices. Despite this mistrust, Paraná showed resilience in fending off threats and overcoming obstacles and setbacks. However, in September 1856, at the height of his career, he died unexpectedly, although the cabinet survived him until May 1857.

The Conservative Party had split down the middle: on one side were the ultraconservatives, and on the other, the moderate conservatives who supported the Conciliation. The ultraconservatives were led by Joaquim Rodrigues Torres, Viscount of Itaboraí, Eusébio de Queirós, and Paulino Soares de Sousa, 1st Viscount of Uruguai—all former ministers in the 1848–1853 cabinet. These elder statesmen had taken control of the Conservative Party after Paraná's death. In the years following 1857, none of the cabinets survived long. They quickly collapsed due to the lack of a majority in the Chamber of Deputies.

The remaining members of the Liberal Party, which had languished since its fall in 1848 and the disastrous Praieira rebellion in 1849, took advantage of what seemed to be the Conservative Party's impending implosion to return to national politics with renewed strength. They delivered a powerful blow to the government when they managed to win several seats in the Chamber of Deputies in 1860. When many moderate conservatives defected to unite with liberals to form a new political party, the Progressive League, the conservatives' hold on power became unsustainable due to the lack of a workable governing majority in the parliament. They resigned, and in May 1862 Pedro II named a progressive cabinet. The period since 1853 had been one of peace and prosperity for Brazil: "The political system functioned smoothly. Civil liberties were maintained. A start had been made on the introduction into Brazil of railroad, telegraph and steamship lines. The country was no longer troubled by the disputes and conflicts that had racked it during its first thirty years."

=== Paraguayan War ===
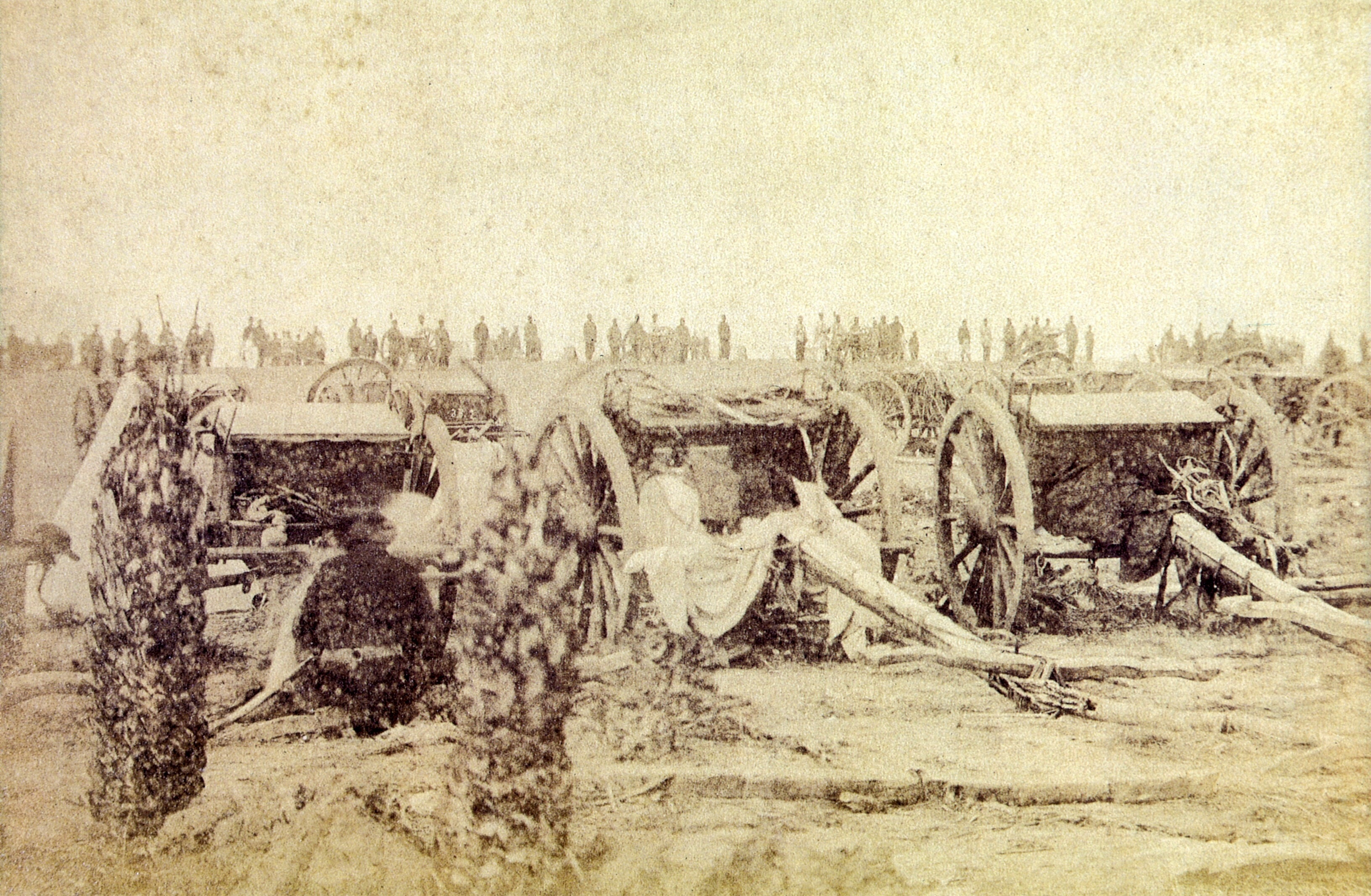
Brazilian artillery in position during the Paraguayan War, 1866

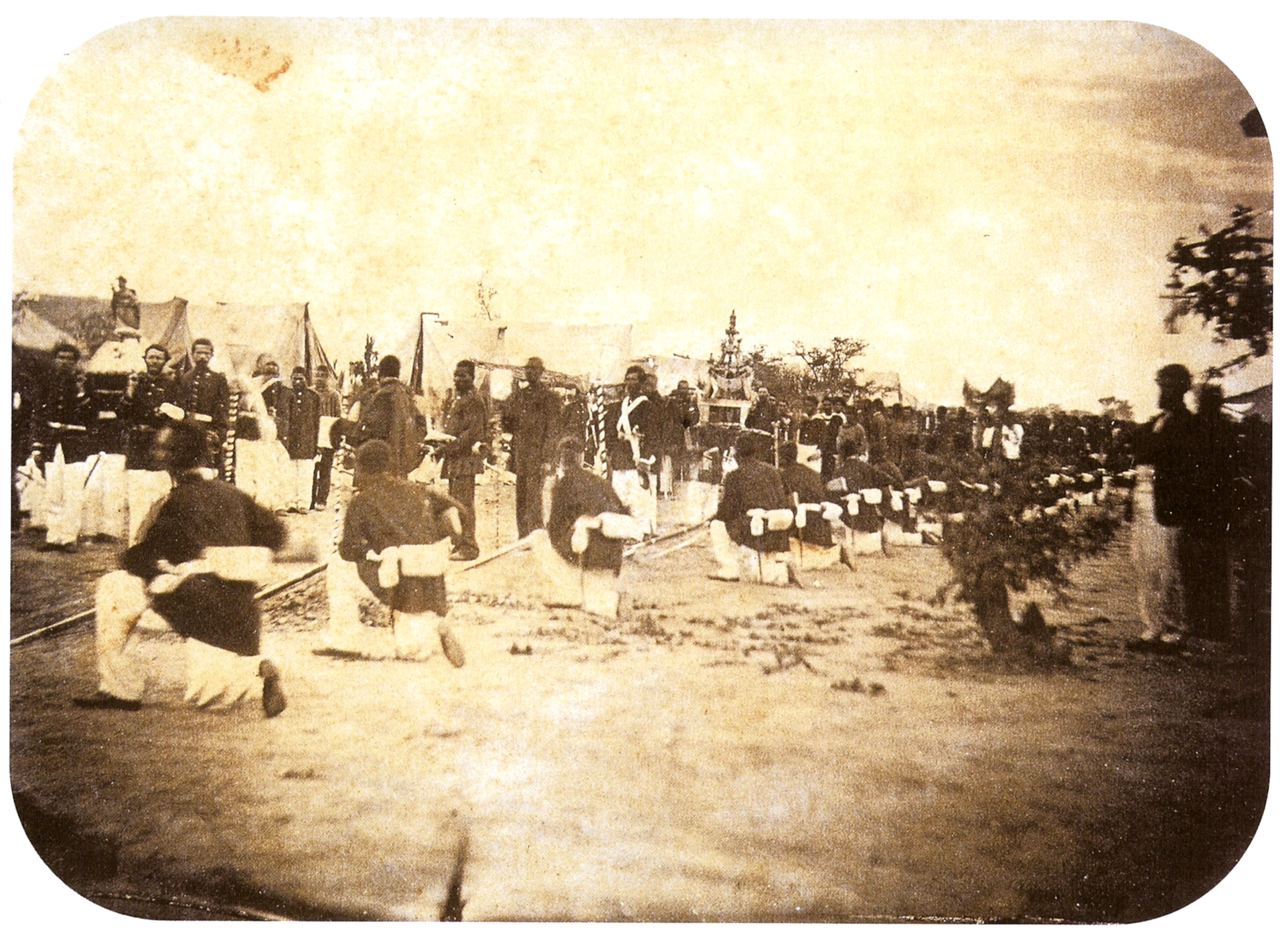
Brazilian soldiers kneeling before a religious procession during the Paraguayan War, 1868

This period of calm came to an end in 1863, when the British consul in Rio de Janeiro nearly sparked a war by issuing an abusive ultimatum to Brazil in response to two minor incidents. The Brazilian government refused to yield, and the consul issued orders for British warships to capture Brazilian merchant vessels as indemnity. Brazil prepared itself for the imminent conflict, and coastal defenses were given permission to fire upon any British warship that tried to capture Brazilian merchant ships. The Brazilian government then severed diplomatic ties with Britain in June 1863.

As war with the British Empire loomed, Brazil had to turn its attention to its southern frontiers. Another civil war had begun in Uruguay which pitted its political parties against one another. The internal conflict led to the murder of Brazilians and the looting of their Uruguayan properties. Brazil's progressive cabinet decided to intervene and dispatched an army, which invaded Uruguay in December 1864, beginning the brief Uruguayan War. The dictator of nearby Paraguay, Francisco Solano López, took advantage of the Uruguayan situation in late 1864 by attempting to establish his nation as a regional power. In November of that year, he ordered a Brazilian civilian steamship seized, triggering the Paraguayan War, and then invaded Brazil.

What had appeared at the outset to be a brief and straightforward military intervention led to a full-scale war in South America's southeast. However, the possibility of a two-front conflict (with Britain and Paraguay) faded when, in September 1865, the British government sent an envoy who publicly apologized for the crisis between the empires. The Paraguayan invasion in 1864 led to a conflict far longer than expected, and faith in the progressive cabinet's ability to prosecute the war vanished. Also, from its inception, the Progressive League was plagued by internal conflict between factions formed by former moderate conservatives and by former liberals.

The cabinet resigned and the Emperor named the aging Viscount of Itaboraí to head a new cabinet in July 1868, marking the return of the conservatives to power. This impelled both progressive wings to set aside their differences, leading them to rechristen their party as the Liberal Party. A third, smaller and radical progressive wing would declare itself republican in 1870—an ominous signal for the monarchy. Nonetheless, the "ministry formed by the viscount of Itaboraí was a far abler body than the cabinet it replaced" and the conflict with Paraguay ended in March 1870 with total victory for Brazil and its allies. More than 50,000 Brazilian soldiers had died, and war costs were eleven times the government's annual budget. However, the country was so prosperous that the government was able to retire the war debt in only ten years. The conflict was also a stimulus to national production and economic growth.

The war also accelerated the expansion of the Brazilian state. The central government sharply increased its expenditures and took on a greater role in organizing the war effort. It also encouraged state investment in infrastructure, including the expansion of the Pedro II Railway, which gained greater strategic importance during the conflict.

=== Apogee ===
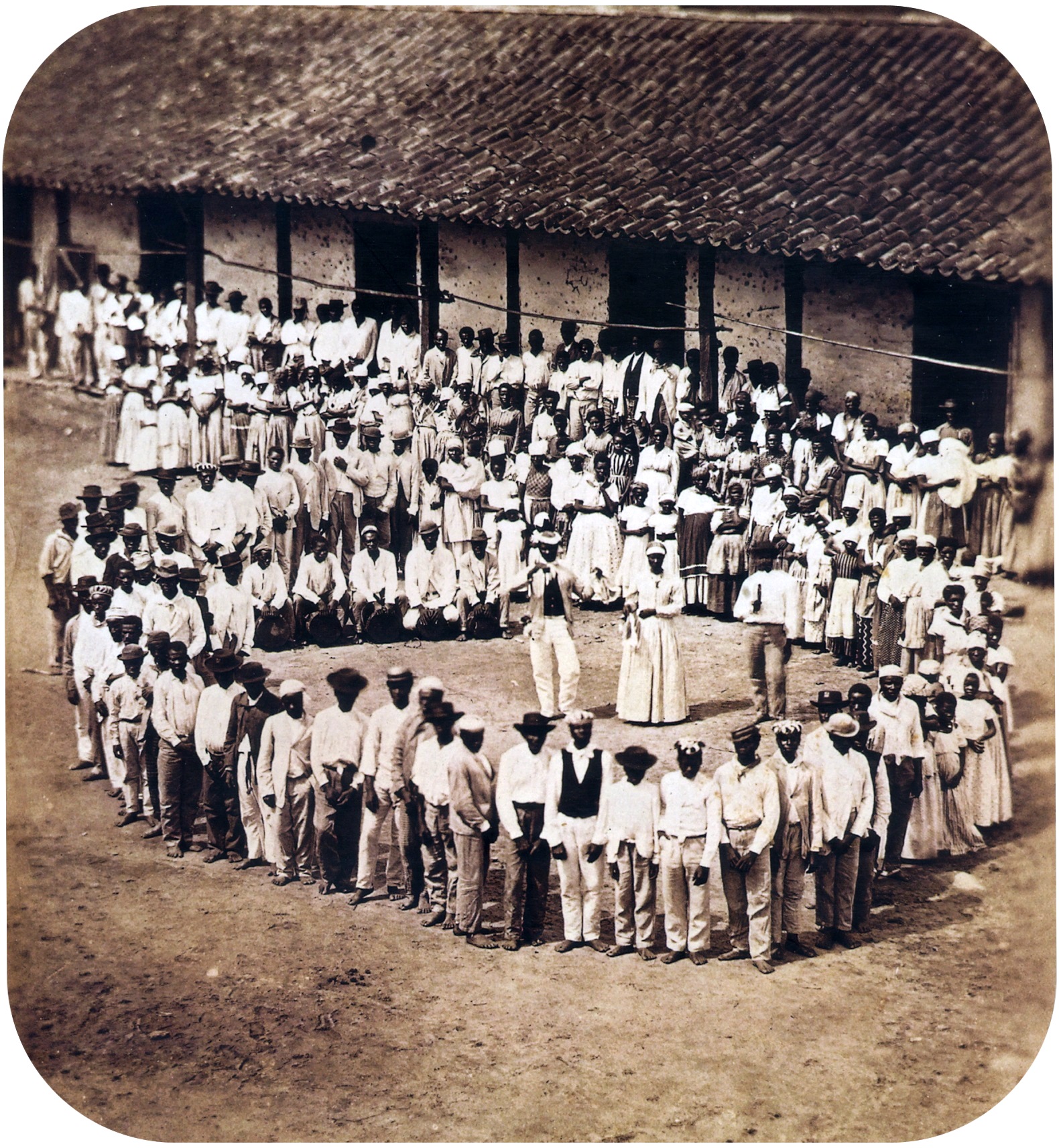
Slaves on a farm in the province of Minas Gerais, 1876

The diplomatic victory over the British Empire and the military victory over Uruguay in 1865, followed by the successful conclusion of the war with Paraguay in 1870, marked the beginning of the "golden age" of the Brazilian Empire. The Brazilian economy grew rapidly; railroad, shipping and other modernization projects were started; immigration flourished. The Empire became known internationally as a modern and progressive nation, second only to the United States in the Americas; it was a politically stable economy with a good investment potential.

In March 1871, Pedro II named the conservative José Paranhos, Viscount of Rio Branco as the head of a cabinet whose main goal was to pass a law to immediately free all children born to female slaves. The controversial bill was introduced in the Chamber of Deputies in May and faced "a determined opposition, which commanded support from about one third of the deputies and which sought to organize public opinion against the measure." The bill was finally promulgated in September and became known as the "Law of Free Birth". Rio Branco's success, however, seriously damaged the long-term political stability of the Empire. The law "split the conservatives down the middle, one party faction backed the reforms of the Rio Branco cabinet, while the second—known as the escravocratas (English: slavocrats)—were unrelenting in their opposition", forming a new generation of ultraconservatives.

The "Law of Free Birth", and Pedro II's support for it, resulted in the loss of the ultraconservatives' unconditional loyalty to the monarchy. The Conservative Party had experienced serious divisions before, during the 1850s, when the Emperor's total support for the conciliation policy had given rise to the Progressives. The ultraconservatives led by Eusébio, Uruguai and Itaboraí who opposed conciliation in the 1850s had nonetheless believed that the Emperor was indispensable to the functioning of the political system: the Emperor was an ultimate and impartial arbiter when political deadlock threatened. By contrast, this new generation of ultraconservatives had not experienced the Regency and early years of Pedro II's reign, when external and internal dangers had threatened the Empire's very existence; they had only known prosperity, peace and a stable administration. To them—and to the ruling classes in general—the presence of a neutral monarch who could settle political disputes was no longer important. Furthermore, since Pedro II had clearly taken a political side on the slavery question, he had compromised his position as a neutral arbiter. The young ultraconservative politicians saw no reason to uphold or defend the Imperial office.

=== Decline ===
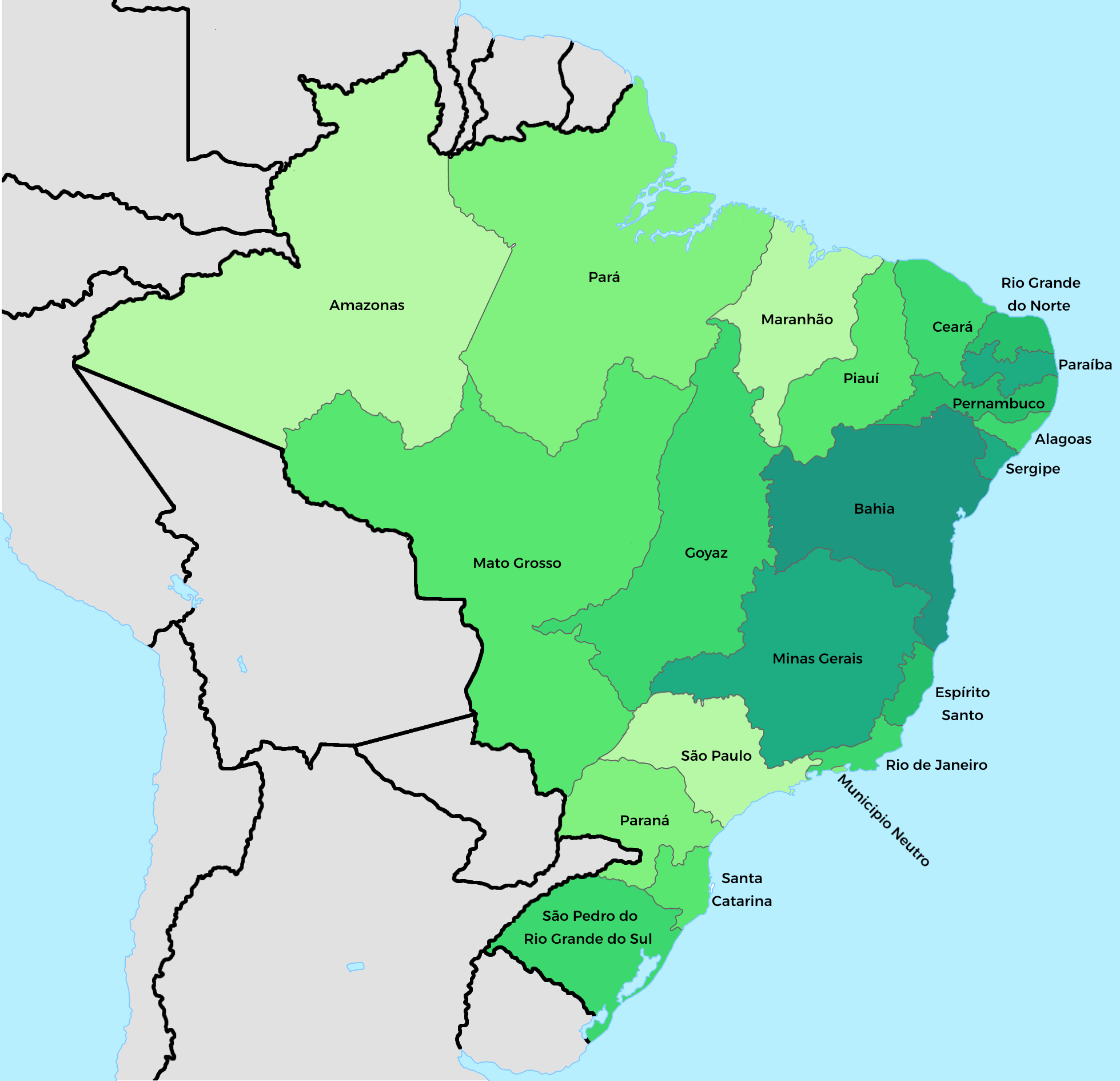
The Empire of Brazil, c. 1889. Cisplatina had been lost since 1828 and two new provinces had been created since then (Amazonas and Paraná)

The weaknesses in the monarchy took many years to become apparent. Brazil continued to prosper during the 1880s, with the economy and society both developing rapidly, including the first organized push for women's rights (which would progress slowly over the next decades). By contrast, letters written by Pedro II reveal a man grown world-weary with age, increasingly alienated from current events and pessimistic in outlook. He remained diligent in performing his formal duties as Emperor, albeit often without enthusiasm, but he no longer actively intervened to maintain stability in the country. His increasing "indifference towards the fate of the regime" and his inaction to protect the imperial system once it came under threat have led historians to attribute the "prime, perhaps sole, responsibility" for the dissolution of the monarchy to the Emperor himself.

The lack of an heir who could feasibly provide a new direction for the nation also threatened the long-term prospects for the Brazilian monarchy. The Emperor's heir was his eldest daughter Isabel, the Princess Imperial, who had no interest in, nor expectation of, becoming the monarch. Even though the Constitution allowed female succession to the throne, Brazil was still a very traditional, male-dominated society, and the prevailing view was that only a male monarch would be capable as head of state. Pedro II, the ruling circles and the wider political establishment all considered a female successor to be inappropriate, and Pedro II himself believed that the death of his two sons and the lack of a male heir were a sign that the Empire was destined to be supplanted.

A weary emperor who no longer cared for the throne, an heir who had no desire to assume the crown, an increasingly discontented ruling class who were dismissive of the Imperial role in national affairs: all these factors presaged the monarchy's impending doom. The means to achieve the overthrow of the Imperial system would soon appear within the Army ranks. Republicanism had never flourished in Brazil outside of certain elitist circles, and had little support in the provinces. A growing combination of republican and positivist ideals among the army's junior and mid-level officer ranks, however, began to form a serious threat to the monarchy. These officers favored a republican dictatorship, which they believed would be superior to the liberal democratic monarchy. Beginning with small acts of insubordination at the beginning of the 1880s, discontent in the army grew in scope and audacity during the decade, as the Emperor was uninterested and the politicians proved incapable of re-establishing the government's authority over the military.

=== Fall ===
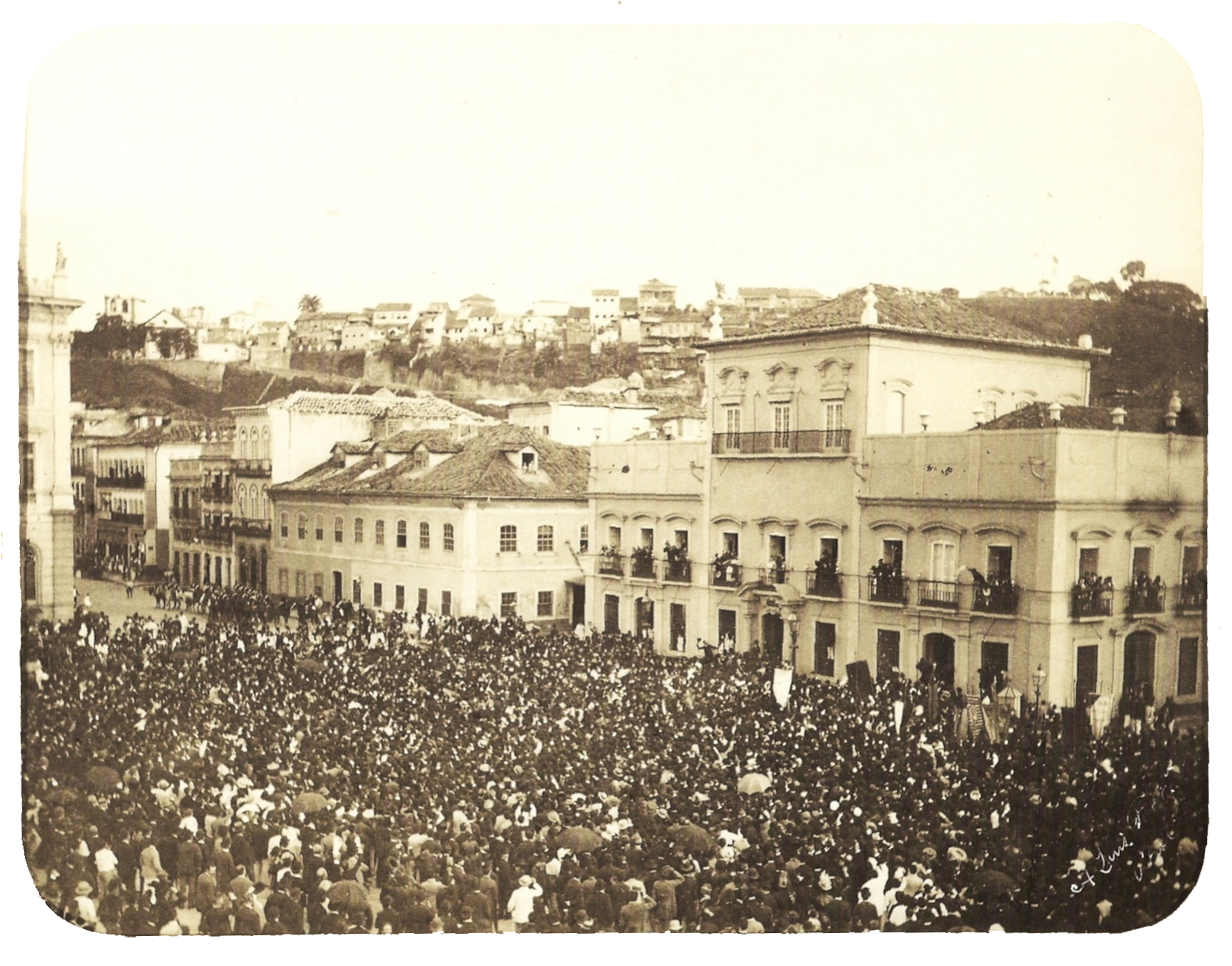
A few moments after signing the Golden Law, Princess Isabel is greeted from the central balcony of the City Palace by a huge crowd below in the street

The nation enjoyed considerable international prestige during the final years of the Empire and had become an emerging power in the international arena. While Pedro II was receiving medical treatment in Europe, the parliament passed, and Princess Isabel signed on 13 May 1888, the Golden Law, which completely abolished slavery in Brazil. Predictions of economic and labor disruption caused by the abolition of slavery proved to be unfounded. Nonetheless, the end of slavery was the final blow to any remaining belief in the crown's neutrality, and this resulted in an explicit shift of support to Republicanism by the ultraconservatives—themselves backed by rich and powerful coffee farmers who held great political, economic and social power in the country.

To avert a republican backlash, the government exploited the credit readily available to Brazil as a result of its prosperity to fuel further development. The government extended massive loans at favorable interest rates to plantation owners and lavishly granted titles and lesser honors to curry favor with influential political figures who had become disaffected. The government also indirectly began to address the problem of the recalcitrant military by revitalizing the moribund National Guard, by then an entity which existed mostly only on paper.

The measures taken by the government alarmed civilian republicans and the positivists in the military. The republicans saw that it would undercut support for their own aims, and were emboldened to further action. The reorganization of the National Guard was begun by the cabinet in August 1889, and the creation of a rival force caused the dissidents among the officer corps to consider desperate measures. For both groups, republicans and military, it had become a case of "now or never". Although there was no desire among the majority of Brazilians to change the country's form of government, republicans began pressuring army officers to overthrow the monarchy.

They launched a coup and instituted the republic on 15 November 1889. The few people who witnessed what occurred did not realize that it was a rebellion. Historian Lídia Besouchet noted that, "[r]arely has a revolution been so minor." Throughout the coup Pedro II showed no emotion, as if unconcerned about the outcome. He dismissed all suggestions put forward by politicians and military leaders for quelling the rebellion. The Emperor and his family were sent into exile on 17 November. Although there was significant monarchist reaction after the fall of the Empire, this was thoroughly suppressed, and neither Pedro II nor his daughter supported a restoration. Despite being unaware of the plans for a coup, once it occurred and in light of the Emperor's passive acceptance of the situation, the political establishment supported the end of the monarchy in favor of a republic. They were unaware that the goal of the coup leaders was the creation of a dictatorial republic rather than a presidential or parliamentary republic.

== Government ==
=== Parliament ===
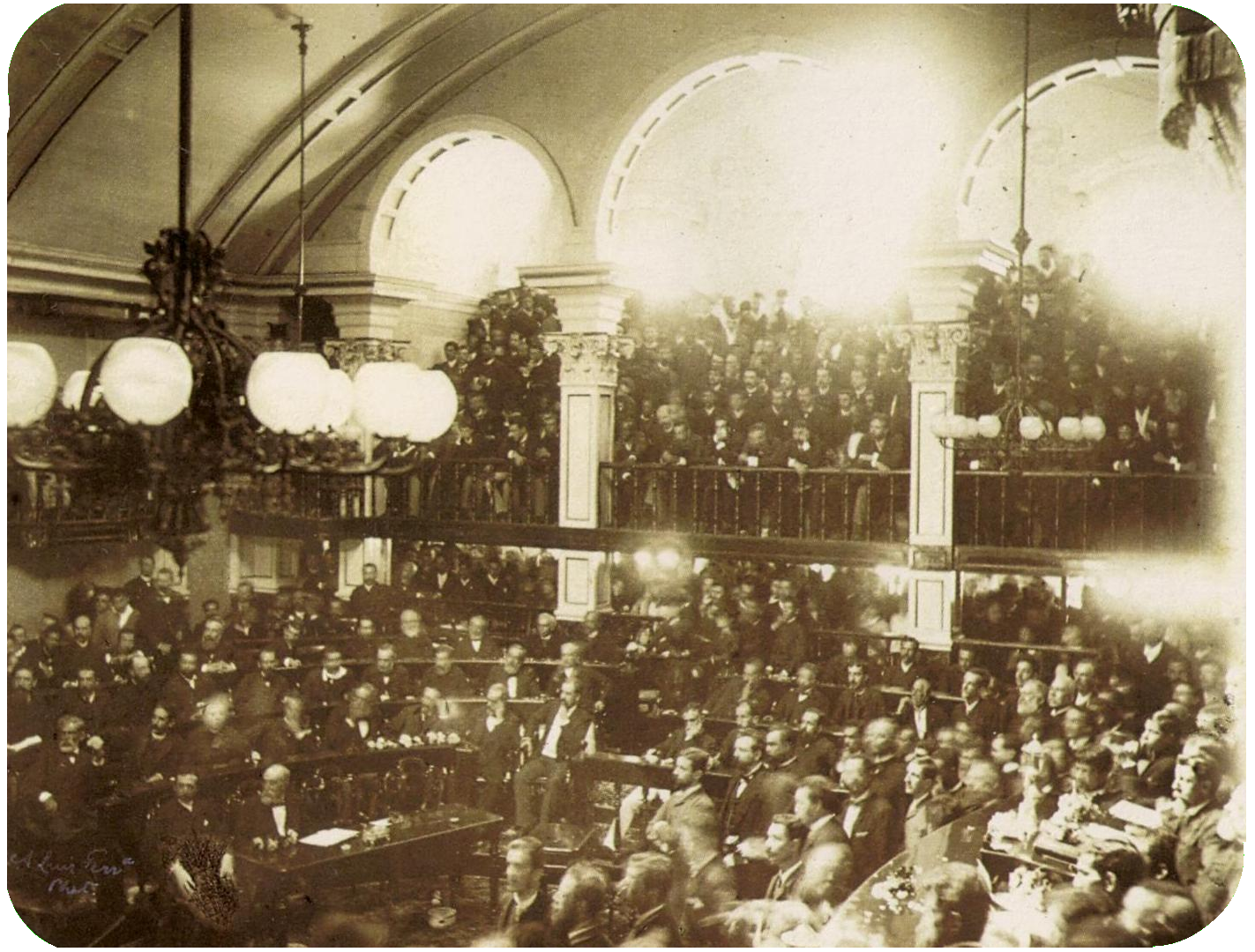
The Brazilian Senate voting on the Golden Law in 1888 as spectators watch from the gallery

Article 2 of Brazil's 1824 Constitution defined the roles of both the emperor and the General Assembly of Brazil which in 1824 was composed of 50 senators and 102 general deputies, as the nation's representatives. The Constitution endowed the Assembly with both status and authority, and created legislative, moderating, executive and judicial branches as "delegations of the nation" with the separation of those powers envisaged as providing balances in support of the Constitution and the rights it enshrined.

The prerogatives and authority granted to the legislature within the Constitution meant that it could and would play a major and indispensable role in the functioning of the government—it was not a mere rubber stamp. The General Assembly alone could enact, revoke, interpret, and suspend laws under Article 13 of the Constitution. The legislature also held the power of the purse and was required to annually authorize expenditures and taxes. It alone approved and exercised oversight of government loans and debts. Other responsibilities entrusted to the Assembly included setting the size of the military's forces, the creation of offices within the government, monitoring the national welfare and ensuring that the government was being run in conformity to the Constitution. This last provision allowed the legislature wide authority to examine and debate government policy and conduct.

Regarding matters of foreign policy, the Constitution (under Article 102) required that the General Assembly be consulted about declarations of war, treaties and the conduct of international relations. A determined legislator could exploit these Constitutional provisions to block or limit government decisions, influence appointments and force reconsideration of policies.

During the Assembly's annual four-month sessions, the body conducted public debates that were widely reported and served as a national forum for the expression of public concerns from all parts of the country. These debates frequently provided a venue for expressing opposition to policies and airing grievances. Legislators enjoyed immunity from prosecution for speeches made from the floor and in the discharge of their duties, and only their own chambers within the Assembly could order the arrest of a member during their tenure. "With no actual responsibility for the actual conduct of affairs, the legislators were free to propose sweeping reforms, advocate ideal solutions, and denounce compromising and opportunistic conduct by the government."

=== Emperor and council of ministers ===
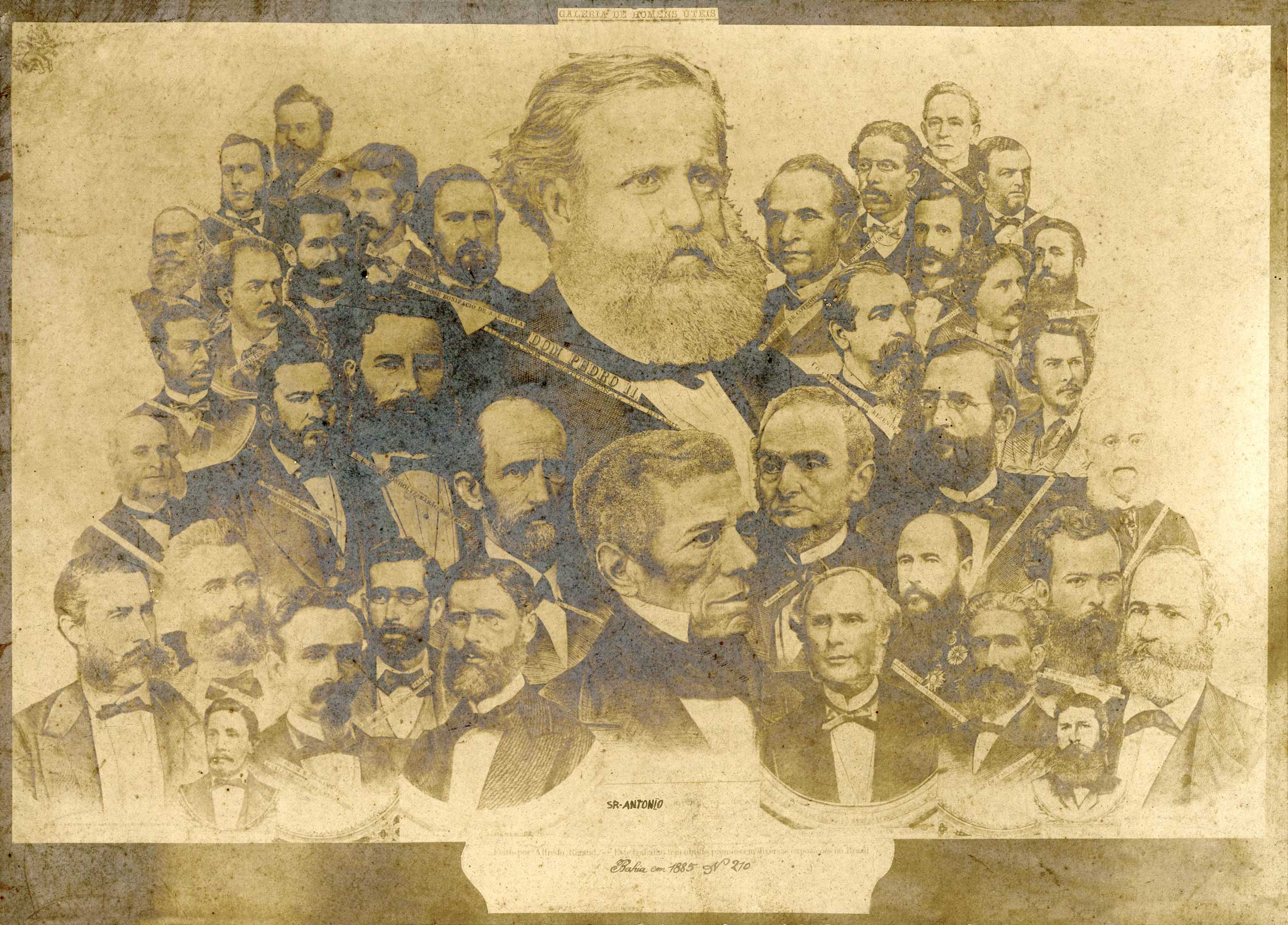
Emperor Pedro II surrounded by prominent politicians and national figures c. 1875

The emperor was the head of both the moderating and executive branches (being aided by the Council of State and the Council of Ministers, respectively); he had the final say and held ultimate control over the national government. He was tasked with ensuring national independence and stability. The Constitution (Article 101) gave him very few avenues for imposing his will upon the General Assembly. His main recourse was the right to dissolve or extend legislative sessions. In the Senate, an emperor's authority to appoint senators did not necessarily give him added influence since senators held their offices for life and were thus freed from government pressure once confirmed. On those occasions when the Chamber of Deputies was dissolved, new elections were required to be held immediately and the new Chamber seated. "This power was effective when held in reserve as a threat. It could not be employed repeatedly, nor would its use work to the emperor's advantage."

During the reign of Pedro I, the Chamber of Deputies was never dissolved and legislative sessions were never extended or postponed. Under Pedro II, the Chamber of Deputies was only ever dissolved at the request of the president of the Council of Ministers (prime minister). There were eleven dissolutions during Pedro II's reign and, of these, ten occurred after consultation with the Council of State, which was beyond what was required by the Constitution. A constitutional balance of power existed between the General Assembly and the executive branch under the emperor. The legislature could not operate alone and the monarch could not force his will upon the Assembly. In practice, the system functioned smoothly only when both Assembly and Emperor acted in a spirit of cooperation for the national good.

A new element was added when the office of "president of the Council of Ministers" was formally created in 1847—although the role had existed informally since 1843. The president of the Council owed his position to both his party and to the Emperor and these could sometimes come into conflict. 19th-century abolitionist leader and historian Joaquim Nabuco said that the "president of the Council in Brazil was no Russian chancellor, Sovereign's creature, nor a British prime minister, made only by the trust of the [House of] Commons: the delegation of the Crown was to him as necessary and important as the delegation of the Chamber, and, to exert with safety his functions, he had to dominate the caprice, the oscillations and ambitions of the Parliament, as well as to preserve always unalterable the favor, the good will of the emperor."

=== Provincial and local government ===
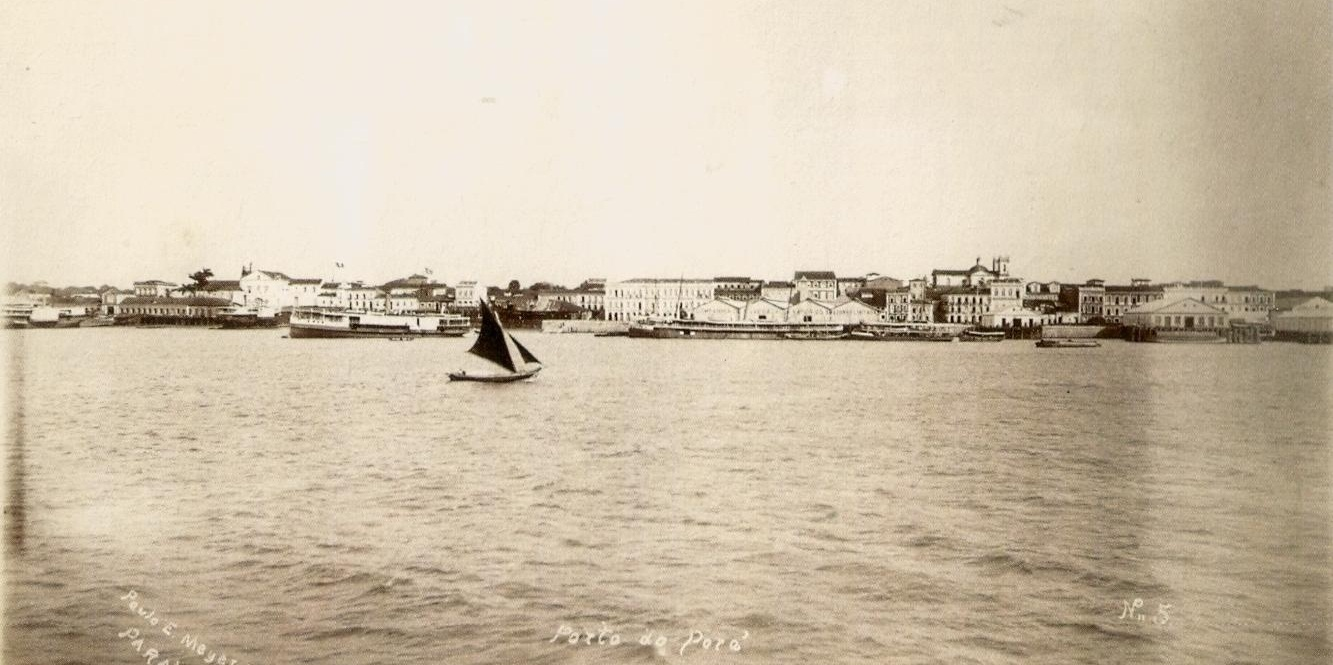
Belém, a medium-sized city and capital of Pará province (Brazilian north), 1889

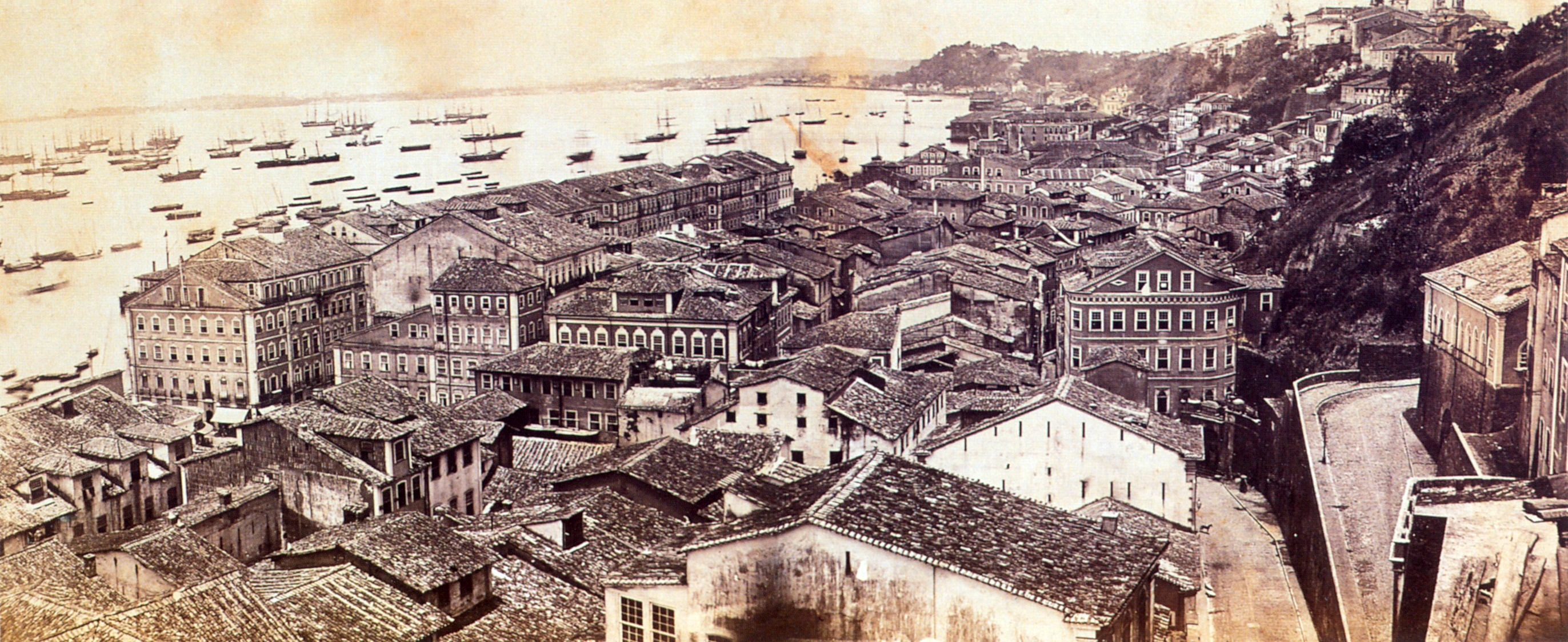
Salvador, a large city and capital of Bahia province (Brazilian northeast), 1870

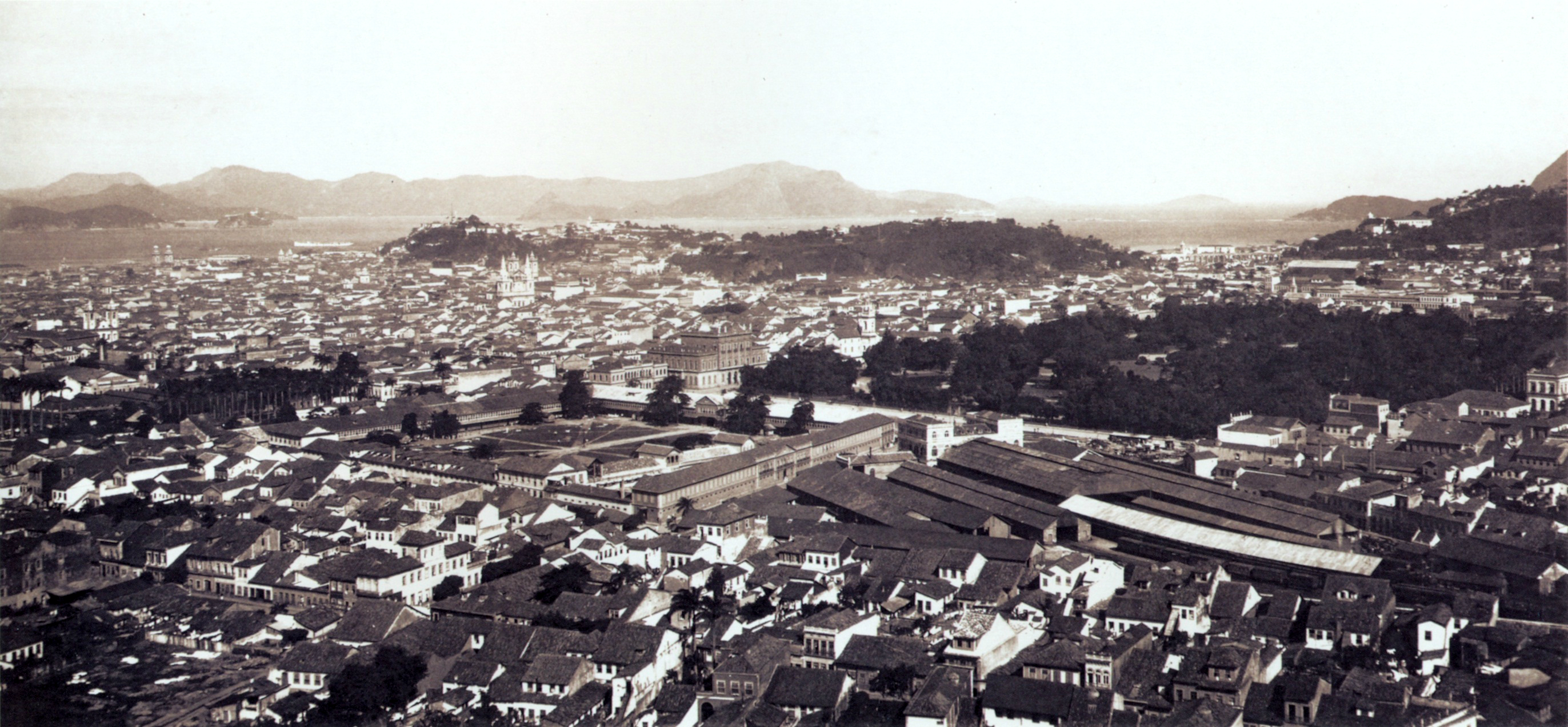
Rio de Janeiro, a metropolis and imperial capital, 1889 (Brazilian southeast). All provinces had great autonomy in relation to the national government.

When enacted in 1824, the Imperial Constitution created the Conselho Geral de Província (Provincial General Council), the legislature of the provinces. This council was composed of either 21 or 13 elected members, depending on the size of a province's population. All "resolutions" (laws) created by the councils required approval by the General Assembly, with no right of appeal. Provincial Councils also had no authority to raise revenues, and their budgets had to be debated and ratified by the General Assembly. Provinces had no autonomy and were entirely subordinate to the national government as the country was a unitary state.

With the 1834 constitutional amendment known as the Additional Act, Provincial General Councils were supplanted by the Assembleias Legislativas Provinciais (Provincial Legislative Assemblies). The new Assemblies enjoyed much greater autonomy from the national government. A Provincial Assembly was composed of 36, 28 or 20 elected deputies, the number depending on the size of the province's population. The election of provincial deputies followed the same procedure as used to elect general deputies to the national Chamber of Deputies.

The responsibilities of the Provincial Assembly included defining provincial and municipal budgets and levying the taxes necessary to support them; providing primary and secondary schools (higher education was the responsibility of the national government); oversight and control of provincial and municipal expenditures; and providing for law enforcement and maintenance of police forces. The Assemblies also controlled the creation and abolishment of, and salaries for, positions within provincial and municipal civil services. The nomination, suspension and dismissal of civil servants was reserved for the president (governor) of the province, but how and under what circumstances he could exercise these prerogatives was delineated by the Assembly. The expropriation of private property (with due monetary compensation) for provincial or municipal interests was also a right of the Assembly. In effect, the Provincial Assembly could enact any kind of law—with no ratification by Parliament—so long as such local laws did not violate or encroach upon the Constitution. However, provinces were not permitted to legislate in the areas of criminal law, criminal procedure laws, civil rights and obligations, the armed forces, the national budget or matters concerning national interests, such as foreign relations.

The provincial presidents were appointed by the national government and were, in theory, charged with governing the province. In practice, however, their power was intangible, varying from province to province based upon each president's relative degree of personal influence and personal character. Since the national government wanted to ensure their loyalty, presidents were, in most cases, sent to a province in which they had no political, familial or other ties. To prevent them from developing any strong local interests or support, presidents would be limited to terms of only a few months in office. As the president usually spent a great deal of time away from the province, often traveling to their native province or the imperial capital, the de facto governor was the vice-president, who was chosen by the Provincial Assembly and was usually a local politician. With little power to undermine provincial autonomy, the president was an agent of the central government with little function beyond conveying its interests to the provincial political bosses. Presidents could be used by the national government to influence, or even rig, elections, although to be effective the president had to rely on provincial and local politicians who belonged to his own political party. This interdependency created a complex relationship which was based upon exchanges of favors, private interests, party goals, negotiations, and other political maneuvering.

The câmara municipal (town council) was the governing body in towns and cities and had existed in Brazil since the beginning of the colonial period in the 16th century. The Chamber was composed of vereadores (councilmen), the number of which depended on the size of the town. Unlike the Provincial General Council, the Constitution gave town councils great autonomy. However, when the Provincial Assembly replaced the Provincial General Council in 1834, many of the powers of town councils (including the setting of municipal budgets, oversight of expenditures, creation of jobs, and the nomination of civil servants) were transferred to the provincial government. Additionally, any laws enacted by the town council had to be ratified by the Provincial Assembly—but not by Parliament. While the 1834 Additional Act granted greater autonomy to the provinces from the central government, it transferred the towns' remaining autonomy to the provincial governments. There was no office of mayor, and towns were governed by a town council and its president (who was the councilman who won the most votes during elections).

=== Elections ===
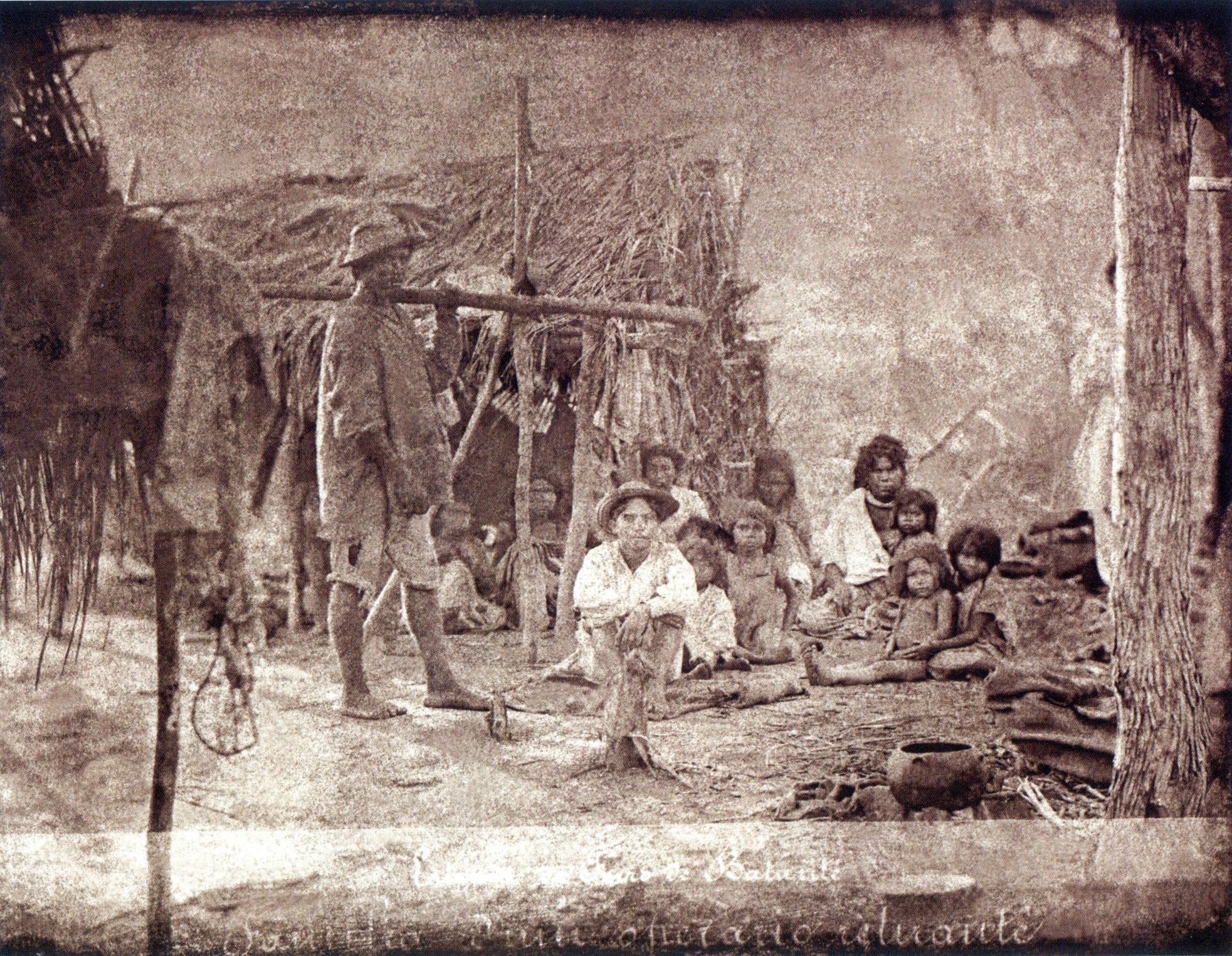
A very poor family of caboclos in Ceará province (Brazilian northeast), 1880. In practice, any employed male citizen could qualify to vote, so most electors had low incomes

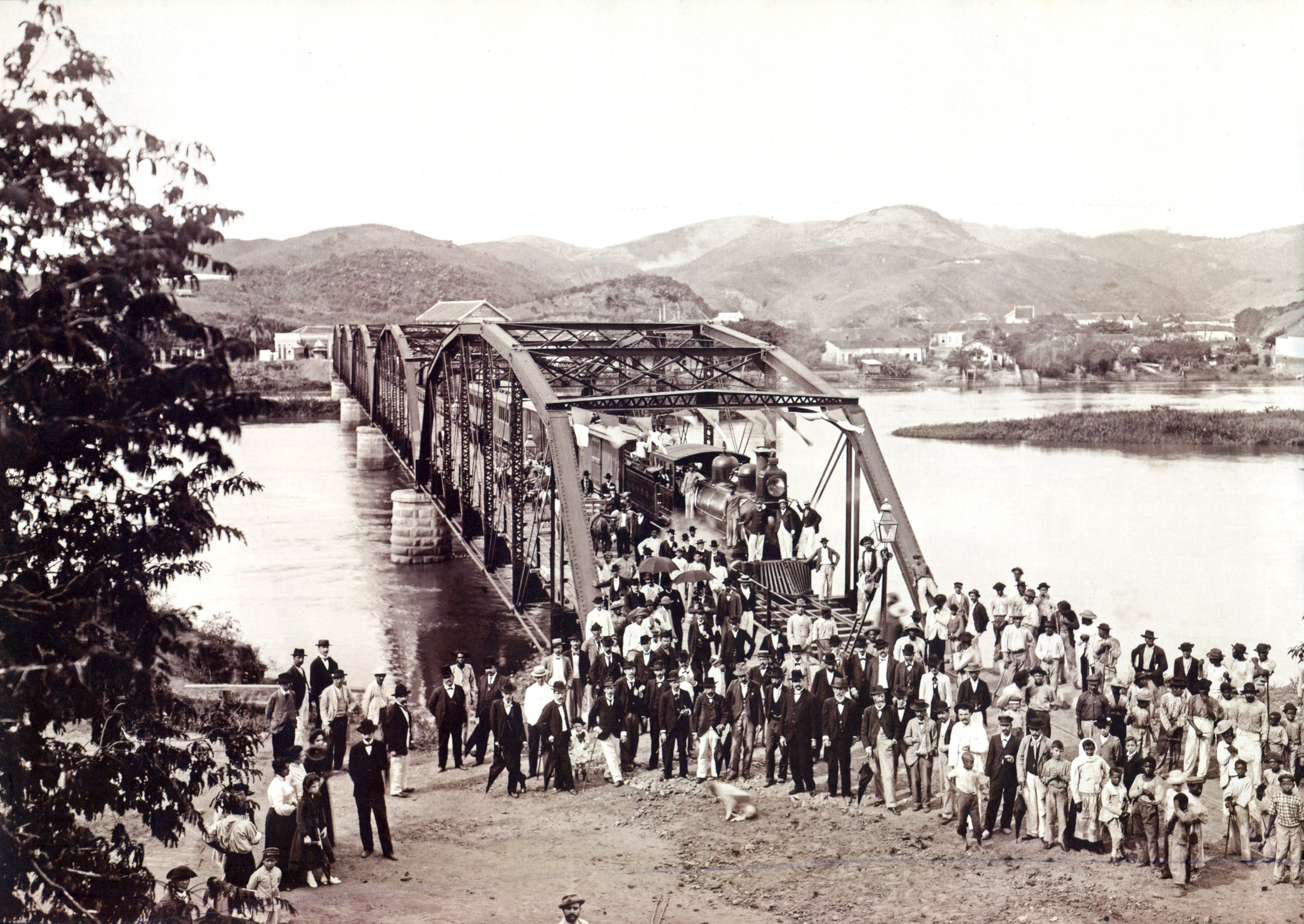
White Brazilians and afro-descendants gathered in the Rio de Janeiro province (Brazilian southeast), c. 1888. Brazil's 19th-century elections were very democratic for the time, but were plagued by fraud

Until 1881, voting was mandatory and elections occurred in two stages. In the first phase voters chose electors who then selected a slate of senatorial candidates. The emperor would choose a new senator (member of the Senate, the upper house in the General Assembly) from a list of the three candidates who had received the highest number of votes. The electors also chose the General Deputies (members of the Chamber of Deputies, the lower house), provincial deputies (members of the Provincial Assemblies) and councilmen (members of the town councils) without the involvement of the emperor in making a final selection. All men over the age of 25 with an annual income of at least Rs 100$000 (or 100,000 réis; the equivalent in 1824 to $98 US) were eligible to vote in the first phase. The voting age was lowered to 21 for married men. To become an elector it was necessary to have an annual income of at least Rs 200$000.

The Brazilian system was relatively democratic for a period during which indirect elections were common in democracies. The income requirement was much higher in the United Kingdom, even after the reforms of 1832. At the time the only nations not requiring a minimum level of income as a qualification for voting were France and Switzerland where universal suffrage was introduced only in 1848. It is probable that no European country at the time had such liberal legislation as Brazil. The income requirement was low enough that any employed male citizen could qualify to vote. As an illustration, the lowest paid civil employee in 1876 was a janitor who earned Rs 600$000 annually.

Most voters in Brazil had a low income. For example, in the Minas Gerais town of Formiga in 1876, the poor constituted 70% of the electorate. In Irajá in the province of Rio de Janeiro, the poor were 87% of the electorate. Former slaves could not vote, but their children and grandchildren could, as could the illiterate (which few countries allowed). In 1872, 10.8% of the Brazilian population voted (13% of the non-slave population). By comparison, electoral participation in the UK in 1870 was 7% of the total population; in Italy it was 2%; in Portugal 9%; and in the Netherlands 2.5%. In 1832, the year of the British electoral reform, 3% of the British voted. Further reforms in 1867 and 1884 expanded electoral participation in the UK to 15%.

Although electoral fraud was common, it was not ignored by the Emperor, politicians or observers of the time. The problem was considered a major issue and attempts were made to correct abuses, with legislation (including the electoral reforms of 1855, 1875 and 1881) repeatedly being enacted to combat fraud. The 1881 reforms brought significant changes: they eliminated the two-stage electoral system, introduced direct and facultative voting, and allowed the votes of former slaves and enfranchised non-Catholics. Conversely, illiterate citizens were no longer allowed to vote. Participation in elections dropped from 13% to only 0.8% in 1886. In 1889, about 15% of the Brazilian population could read and write, so disenfranchising the illiterate does not solely explain the sudden fall in voting percentages. The discontinuation of mandatory voting and voter apathy may have been significant factors contributing to the reduction in the number of voters.

=== Military ===
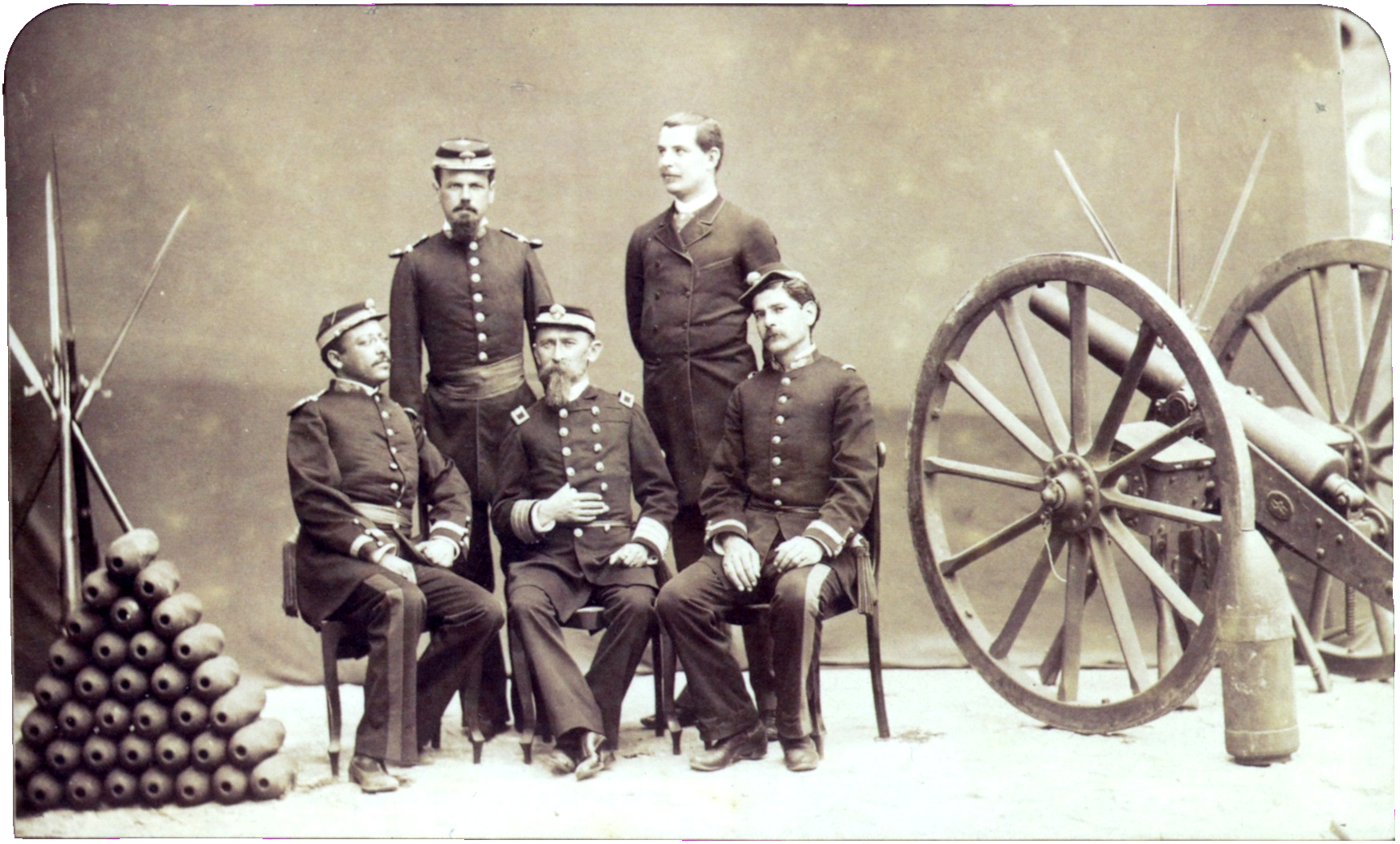
Brazilian Army officers, 1886

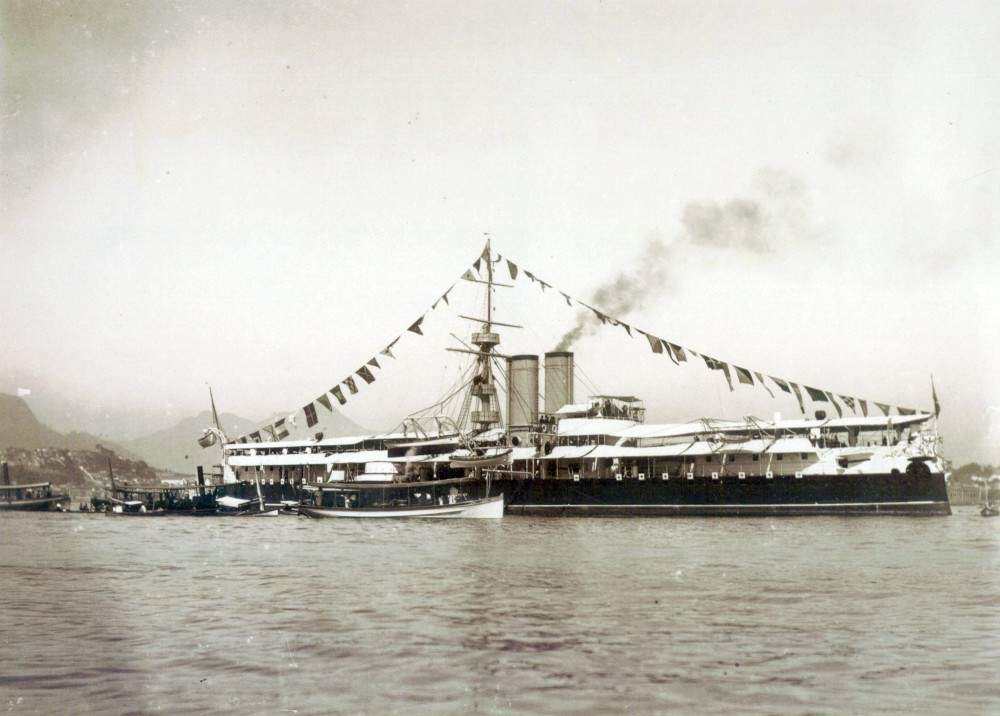
The Brazilian ironclad warship Riachuelo, 1885

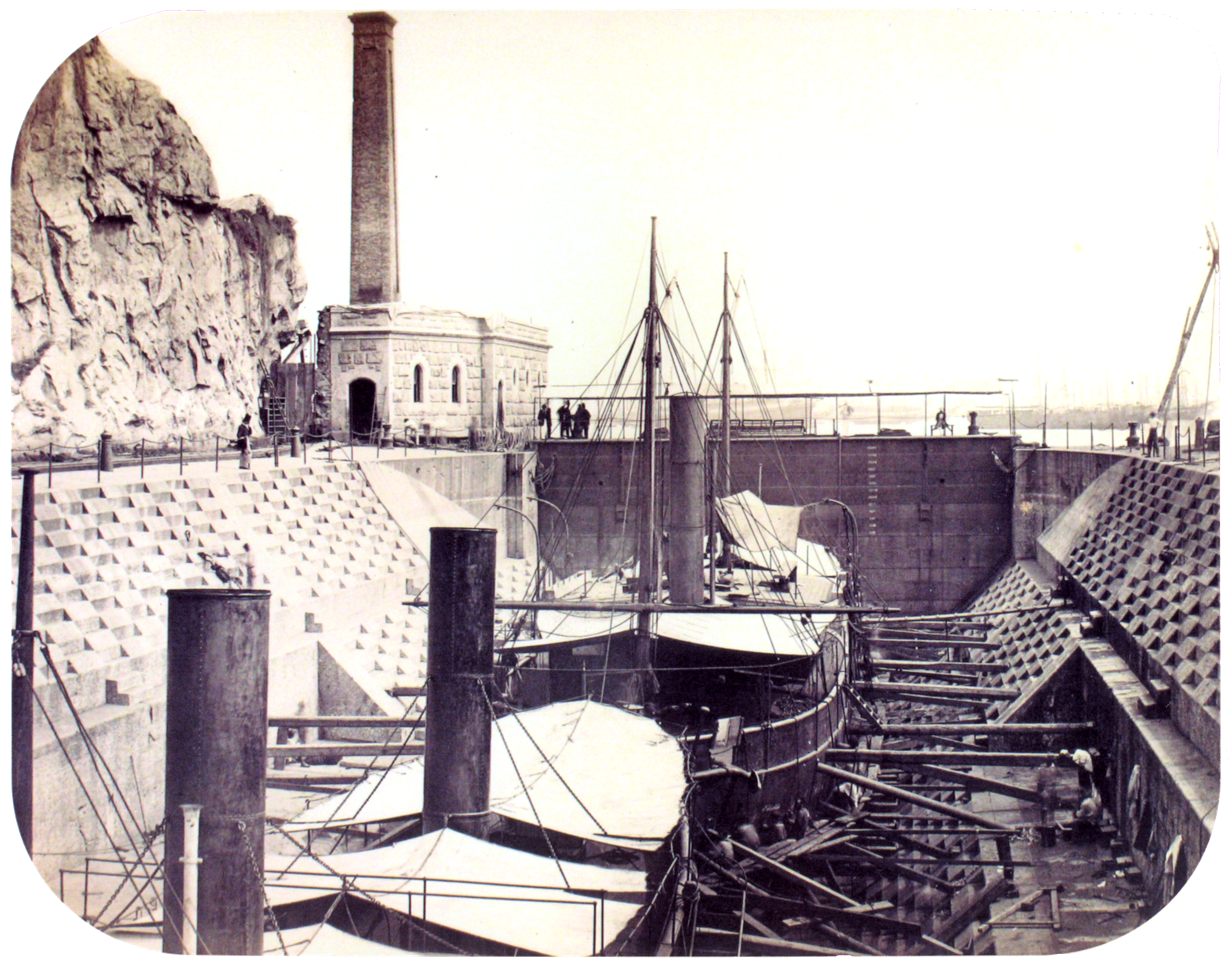
Shipyard in Rio de Janeiro city, c. 1862

Under Articles 102 and 148 of the Constitution, the armed forces were subordinate to the emperor as commander-in-chief. He was aided by the Ministry of War and Ministry of Navy in matters concerning the Army and the Armada (Navy)—although the president of the Council of Ministers usually exercised oversight of both branches in practice. The ministers of War and Navy were, with few exceptions, civilians.

The military was organized along similar lines to the British and American armed forces of the time, in which a small standing army could quickly augment its strength during emergencies from a reserve militia force (in Brazil, the National Guard). Brazil's first line of defense relied upon a large and powerful navy to protect against foreign attack. As a matter of policy, the military was to be completely obedient to civilian governmental control and to remain at arm's length from involvement in political decisions.

Military personnel were allowed to run for and serve in political office while remaining on active duty. However they did not represent the Army or the Armada, but were instead expected to serve the interests of the city or province which had elected them. Pedro I chose nine military officers as senators and appointed five (out of fourteen) to the Council of State. During the Regency, two were named to the Senate and none to the Council of State (this body was dormant during the Regency). Pedro II chose four officers as senators during the 1840s, two in the 1850s and three others during the remaining years of his reign. He also appointed seven officers to be state councilors during the 1840s and 1850s, and three others after that.

The Brazilian armed forces were created in the aftermath of Independence. They were originally composed of Brazilian- and Portuguese-born officers and troops who had remained loyal to the government in Rio de Janeiro during the war of secession from Portugal. The Armed Forces were crucial to the successful outcomes of international conflicts faced by the Empire, starting with Independence (1822–1824), followed by the Cisplatine War (1825–1828), then the Platine War (1851–1852), the Uruguayan War (1864–1865), and finally, the Paraguayan War (1864–1870). They also played a part in quelling rebellions, beginning with the Confederation of the Equator (1824) under Pedro I, followed by the uprisings during Pedro II's early reign, such as the Ragamuffin War (1835–1845), Cabanagem (1835–1840), Balaiada (1838–1841), among others.

The Armada was constantly being modernized with the latest developments in naval warfare. It adopted steam navigation in the 1830s, ironclad plate armor in the 1860s, and torpedoes in the 1880s. By 1889, Brazil had the fifth or sixth most powerful navy in the world, and the most powerful battleships in the Western Hemisphere. The Army, despite its highly experienced and battle-hardened officer corps, was plagued during peacetime by units which were badly paid, inadequately equipped, poorly trained and thinly spread across the vast Empire.

Dissension resulting from inadequate government attention to Army needs was restrained under the generation of officers who had begun their careers during the 1820s. These officers were loyal to the monarchy, believed the military should be under civilian control, and abhorred the caudillism (Hispanic American dictatorships) against which they had fought. However, by the early 1880s, this generation (including commanders such as the Duke of Caxias, the Count of Porto Alegre, and the Marquis of Erval) had died, were retired, or no longer exercised direct command.

Dissatisfaction became more evident during the 1880s, and some officers began to display open insubordination. The Emperor and the politicians did nothing to improve the military nor meet their demands. The dissemination of positivist ideology among young officers brought further complications, as positivism opposed the monarchy under the belief that a dictatorial republic would bring improvements. A coalition between a mutinous Army faction and the positivist camp was formed and directly led to the republican coup on 15 November 1889. Battalions and even full regiments of soldiers loyal to the Empire, who shared the ideals of the older generation of leaders, attempted to restore the monarchy. Attempts at a restoration proved futile and supporters of the Empire were executed, arrested or forcibly retired.

=== Foreign relations ===
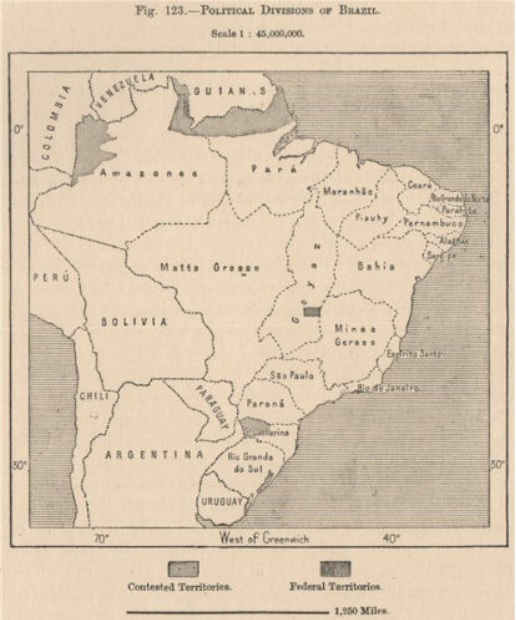
By 1889, most of Brazil's borders had been established by international treaties, with a few contested areas (Note: The matter of the contested regions were later settled peacefully in favor of Brazil's pretentions. The exception was the border with Argentina next to the Brazilian province of Santa Catarina, in which half of its territory were divided amicably between Brazil and its neighbor. The current-day state of Acre, formerly part of Bolivia, was purchased by Brazil in 1903 and had not been claimed during the imperial era.)

Upon independence from Portugal, the immediate focus of Brazil's foreign policy was to gain widespread international recognition. There is no consensus about which countries were the first to recognize the independence of Brazil. According to historian Toby Green, they were the African states of Dahomey and Onim in 1822 and 1823 respectively while researcher Rodrigo Wiese Randig argues that it was the United Provinces of the Río de la Plata around June 1823, followed by the United States in May 1824, and the Kingdom of Benin in July 1824. Other nations followed in establishing diplomatic relations over the next few years. Portugal recognized the separation in August 1825. The Brazilian government subsequently made it a priority to establish its international borders through treaties with its neighbors. The task of securing recognized frontiers was complicated by the fact that, between 1777 and 1801, Portugal and Spain had annulled their previous treaties setting out the borders between their American colonial empires. However, the Empire was able to sign several bilateral treaties with neighbors, including Uruguay (1851), Peru (1851 and 1874), the Republic of New Granada (later Colombia, 1853), Venezuela (1859), Bolivia (1867) and Paraguay (1872). By 1889, most of its borders were firmly established. The remaining issues—including the purchase of the region of Acre from Bolivia which would give Brazil its present-day configuration—were only finally resolved after the country became a republic.

A number of conflicts occurred between the Empire and its neighbors. Brazil experienced no serious conflicts with its neighbors to the north and west, due to the buffer of the nearly impenetrable and sparsely populated Amazonian rainforest. (Note: The only exceptions regarding border disputes in the north and west were minor diplomatic disputes with France and Britain in the northern region. During the 1830s, both countries occupied and unsuccessfully attempted to claim some areas in the north as part of their colonial empires. See Viana 1994, p. 575.) In the south, however, the colonial disputes inherited from Portugal and Spain over the control of the navigable rivers and plains which formed the frontiers continued after independence. The lack of mutually agreed borders in this area led to several international conflicts, from the Cisplatine War to the Paraguayan War.

"Brazil is, next to ourselves, the great power on the American continent", affirmed James Watson Webb, the US minister to Brazil, in 1867. The Empire's rise was noticed as early as 1844 by John C. Calhoun, the US Secretary of State: "Next to the United States, Brazil is the most wealthy, the greatest and the most firmly established of all the American powers." By the early 1870s, the international reputation of the Empire of Brazil had improved considerably, and it remained well-regarded internationally until its end in 1889. Christopher Columbus Andrews, an American diplomat in the Brazilian capital in the 1880s, later recalled Brazil as an "important Empire" in his memoirs. In 1871, Brazil was invited to arbitrate the dispute between the United States and Britain which became known as the Alabama Claims. In 1880, the Empire acted as arbiter between the United States and France over the damage caused to US nationals during the French intervention in Mexico. In 1884, Brazil was called upon to arbitrate between Chile and several other nations (namely France, Italy, Britain, Germany, Belgium, Austria-Hungary and Switzerland) over damages arising from the War of the Pacific.

The Brazilian government eventually felt confident enough to negotiate a trade deal with the United States in 1889, the first to be undertaken with any nation since the disastrous and exploitative trade treaty with Britain in 1826 (canceled in 1844). American historian Steven C. Topik said that Pedro II's "quest for a trade treaty with the United States was part of a grander strategy to increase national sovereignty and autonomy." Unlike the circumstances of the previous pact, the Empire was in a strong position to insist on favorable trade terms, as negotiations occurred during a time of Brazilian domestic prosperity and international prestige.

== Economy ==
=== Currency ===
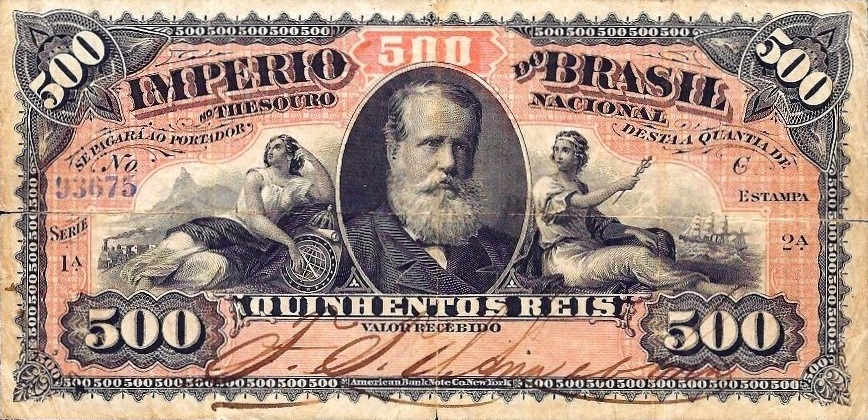
500 réis (royals) or Rs 500

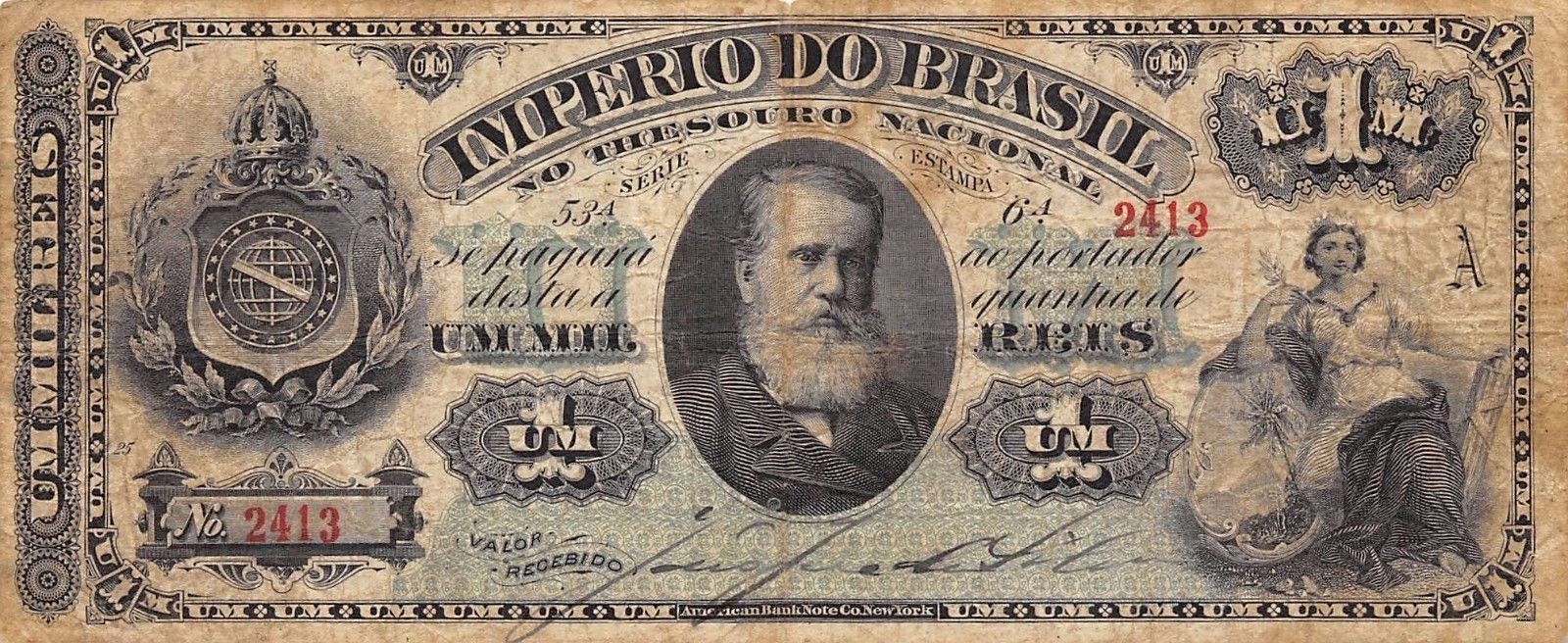
1,000 réis (royals) or Rs 1$000 or milréis (thousand royals)

The unit of currency from the Empire's founding, and until 1942, was the real ("royal" in English, its plural form was réis and is reais in modern Portuguese), and was derived from the Portuguese real. It was usually called milréis (English: thousand royals) and written as 1$000. A thousand milréis (1:000$000)—or one million réis—was known as conto de réis. One conto de réis was represented by the symbol Rs written before the value and by a dollar sign was written before any amounts lower than 1,000 réis. Thus, 350 réis was written as "Rs 350"; 1,712 réis as "Rs 1$712"; and 1,020,800 réis was written as "Rs 1:020$800". For millions, a period was used as a separator between millions, billions, trillions, etc. (e.g., 1 billion réis was written as "Rs 1.000:000$000"). A colon functioned to separate millions from thousands, and the $ sign (typically written as) was inserted between thousands and hundreds (999 or fewer).

=== Overview ===
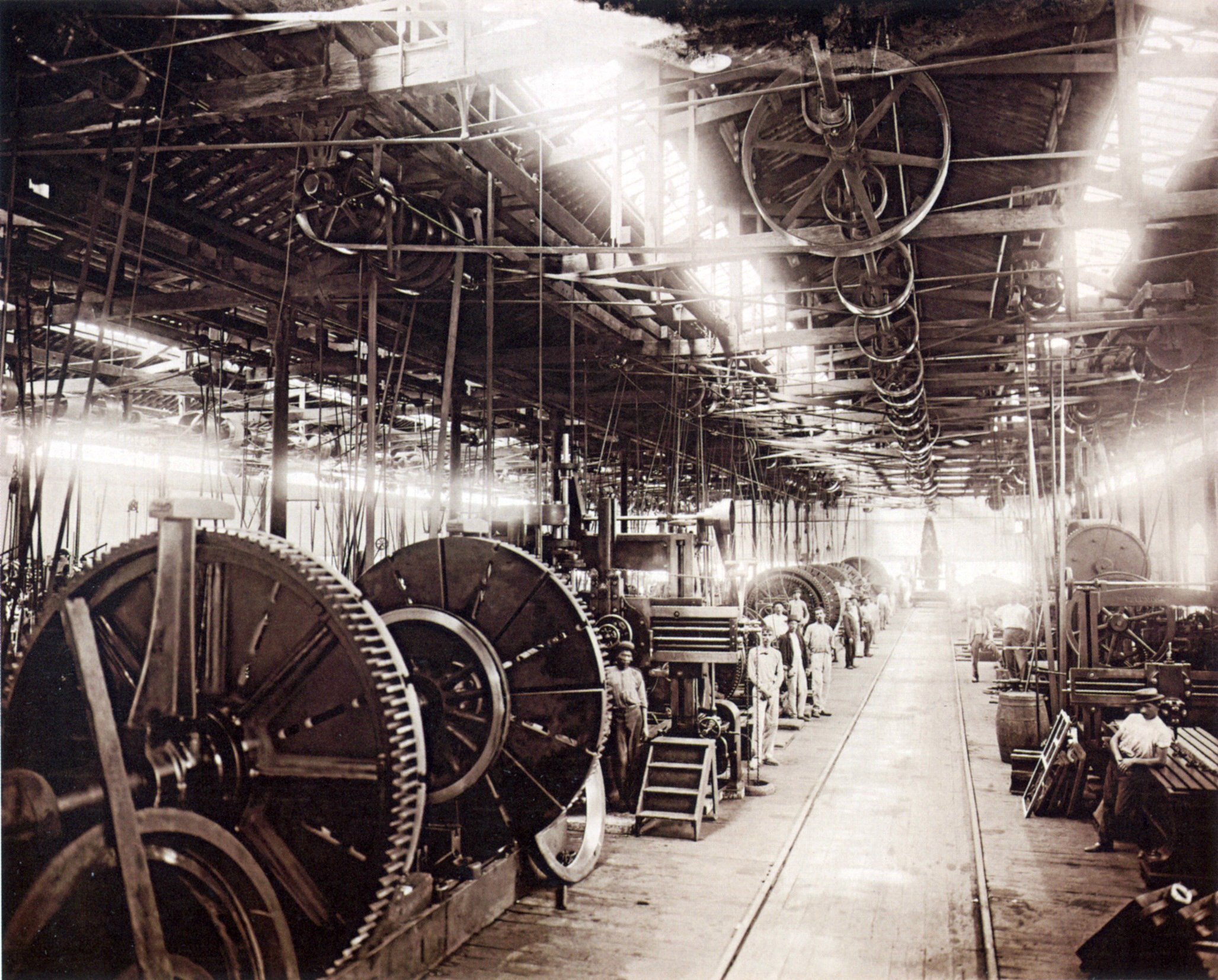
A Brazilian factory, 1880

Brazil's international trade reached a total value of Rs 79.000:000$000 between 1834 and 1839. This continued to increase every year until it reached Rs 472.000:000$000 between 1886 and 1887: an annual growth rate of 3.88% since 1839. The absolute value of exports from the Empire in 1850 was the highest in Latin America, and triple that of Argentina which was in fourth place. Brazil would keep its high standing in exports and general economic growth until the end of the monarchy. Brazilian economic expansion, especially after 1850, compared well with that of the United States and European nations. The national tax revenue amounted to Rs 11.795:000$000 in 1831 and rose to Rs 160.840:000$000 in 1889. By 1858, national tax revenues ranked as the eighth-largest in the world. Imperial Brazil was, despite its progress, a country where wealth was very unequally distributed. However, for purposes of comparison, according to historian Steven C. Topik, in the United States, "by 1890, 80 percent of the population lived on the margin of subsistence, while 20 percent controlled almost all wealth."

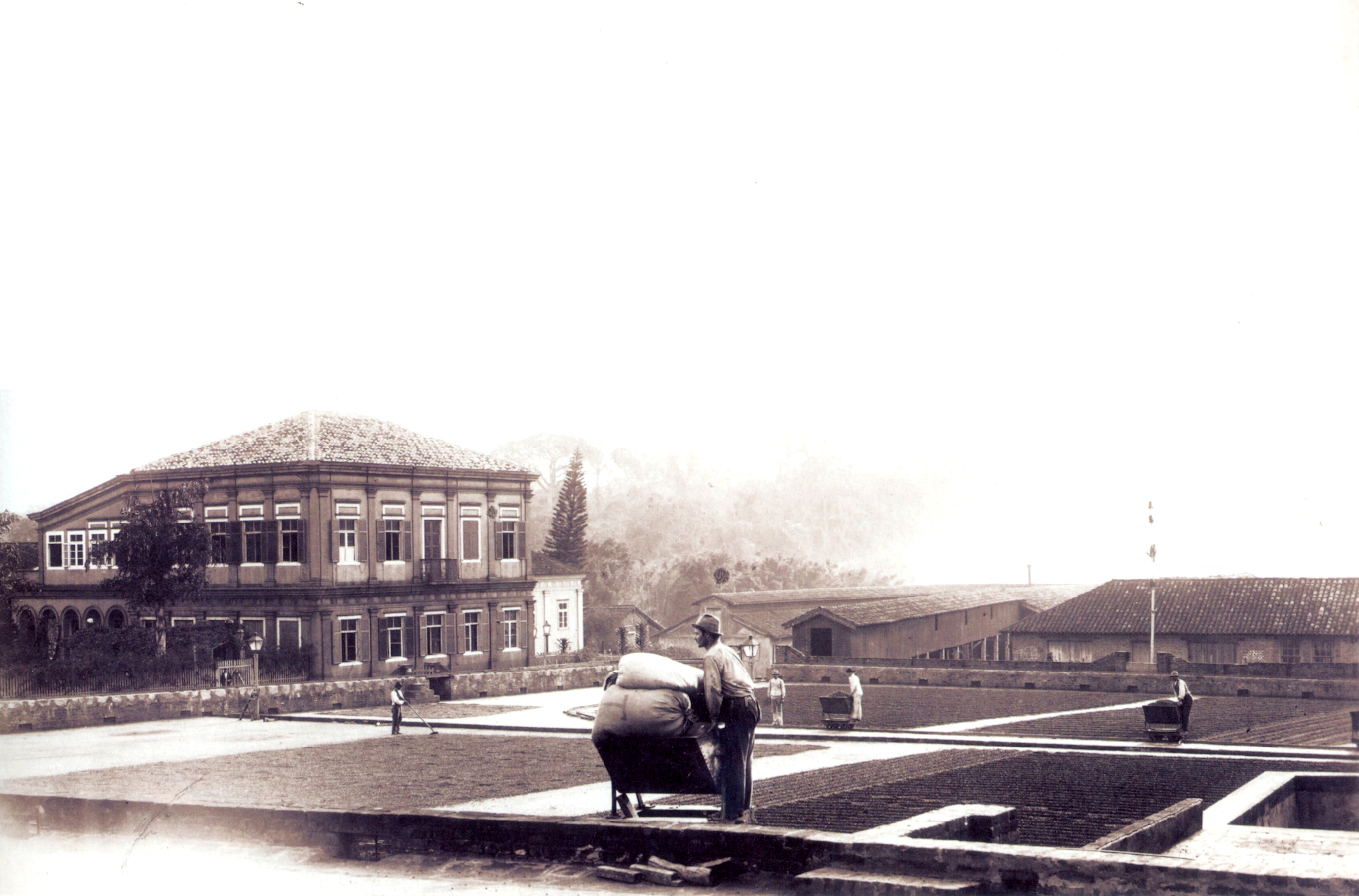
A coffee farm in São Paulo province, 1880

As new technologies appeared, and with increases in internal productivity, exports increased considerably. This made it possible to reach equilibrium in the balance of trade. During the 1820s sugar constituted about 30% of total exports while cotton constituted 21%, coffee 18% and leather and skins 14%. Twenty years later, coffee would reach 42%, sugar 27%, leather and skins 9%, and cotton 8% of the total exports. This did not mean a reduction in the production of any of these items and, in fact, the opposite occurred. Growth occurred in all sectors, some more than others. In the period between 1820 and 1840, Fausto says "Brazilian exports had doubled in volume and had tripled in nominal value" while the valuation denominated in pounds sterling increased by over 40%. Brazil was not the only country where agriculture played an important role on exports. Around 1890, in the United States, by then the richest nation in the Americas, agricultural goods represented 80% of all its exports.

In the 1820s, Brazil exported 11,000 tons of cacao and by 1880 this had increased to 73,500 tons. Between 1821 and 1825, 41,174 tons of sugar were exported, rising to 238,074 tons between 1881 and 1885. Until 1850, rubber production was insignificant, but between 1881 and 1890, it had reached third place among Brazilian exports. This was about 81 tons between 1827 and 1830 reaching 1,632 tons in 1852. By 1900 the country was exporting 24,301,452 tons of rubber. Brazil also exported around 3,377,000 tons of coffee between 1821 and 1860 while between 1861 and 1889 this reached 6,804,000 tons. Technological innovations also contributed to the growth of exports, in particular the adoption of steam navigation and railroads allowed for faster and more convenient cargo transportation.

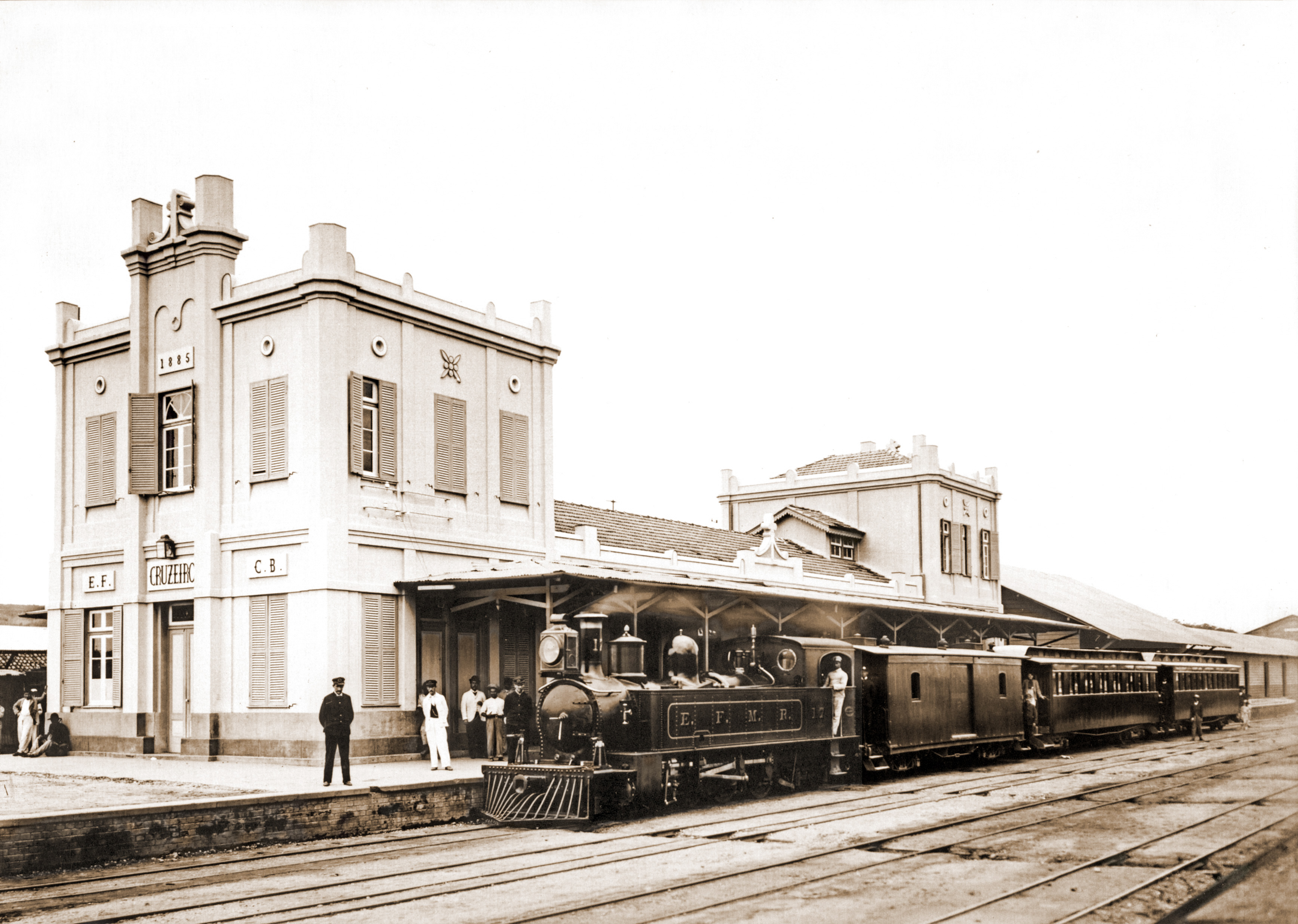
Railroad station in São Paulo province (Brazilian southeast), c. 1885

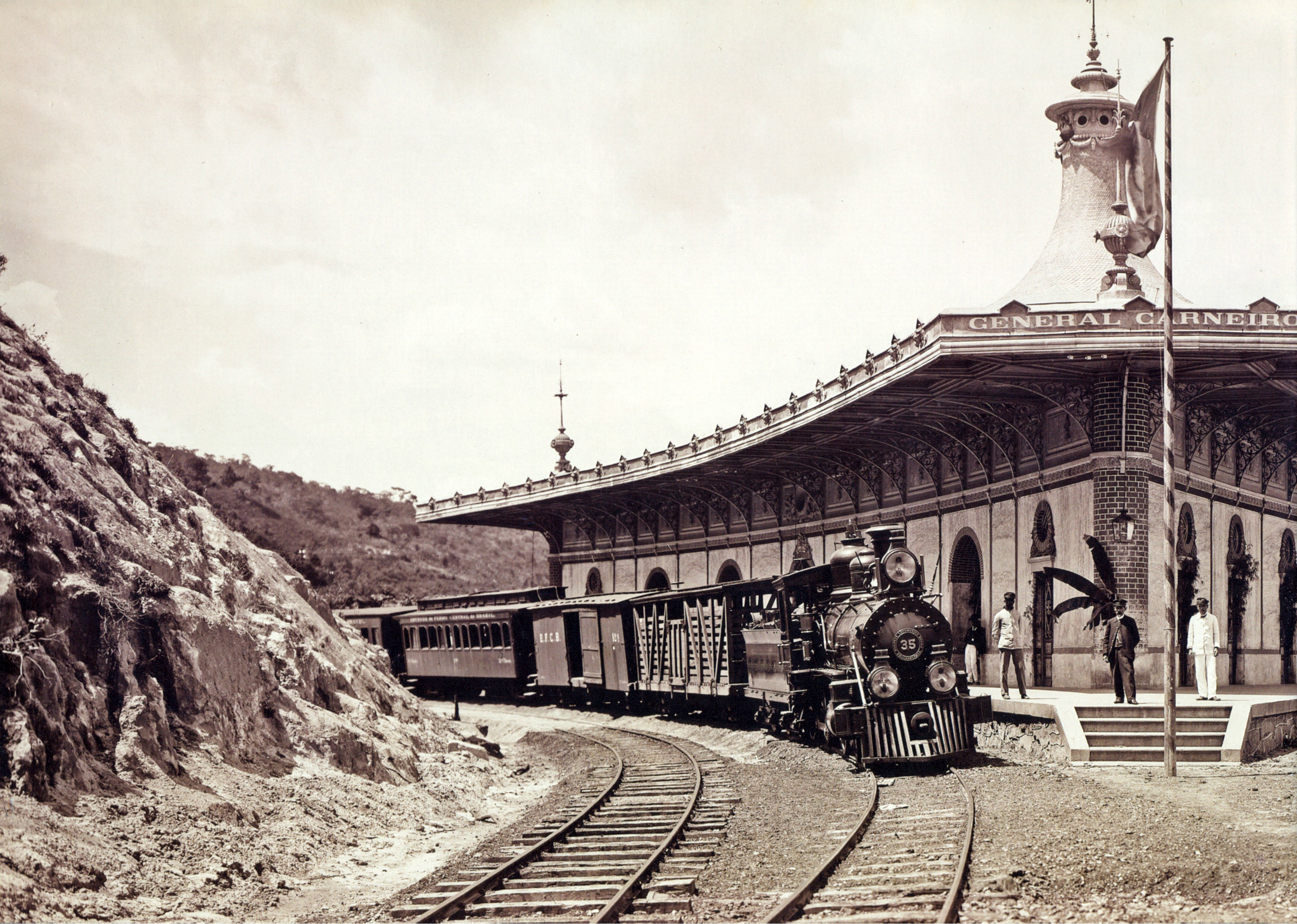
A railroad station in Minas Gerais province (Brazilian southeast), c. 1884

=== Development ===
Development on an immense scale occurred during this period, anticipating similar advancements in European countries. In 1850, there were fifty factories with a total capital of Rs 7.000:000$000. At the end of the Imperial period in 1889, Brazil had 636 factories representing an annual rate of increase of 6.74% over the number in 1850, and with a total capital of approximately Rs 401.630:600$000 (which represents an annual growth rate in value of 10.94% from 1850 to 1889). The "countryside echoed with the clang of iron track being laid as railroads were constructed at the most furious pace of the 19th century; indeed, building in 1880s was the second greatest in absolute terms in Brazil's entire history. Only eight countries in the entire world laid more track in the decade than Brazil." The first railroad line, with only 15 kilometres (9.3 mi) of track, was opened on 30 April 1854 at a time when some European countries still had no rail service. By 1868, there were 718 kilometres (446 mi) of railroad lines, and by the end of the empire in 1889 this had grown to 9,200 kilometres (5,700 mi) with another 9,000 kilometres (5,600 mi) under construction making it the country with "the largest rail network in Latin America".

Factories were constructed throughout the Empire in the 1880s, allowing Brazil's cities to be modernized and "receive the benefits of gas, electrical, sanitation, telegraph, and tram companies. Brazil was entering the modern world." It was the fifth country in the world to install modern city sewers, the third to have sewage treatment and one of the pioneers in the installation of a telephone service. In addition to the foregoing improvements to infrastructure, it was also the first South American nation to adopt public electric lighting (in 1883) and the second in the Americas (behind the United States) to establish a transatlantic telegraphic line connecting it directly to Europe in 1874. The first domestic telegraph line appeared during 1852 in Rio de Janeiro. By 1889, there were 18,925 kilometres (11,759 mi) of telegraph lines connecting the country's capital to distant Brazilian provinces such as Pará and even linking to other South American countries such as Argentina and Uruguay.

== Society ==
=== Demographics ===
Since the second half of the 18th century, when Brazil was still a colony, the government had attempted to gather data regarding the population. However, few captaincies (later called provinces) collected the requested information. After independence the government instituted a commission for statistics in an 1829 decree with a mandate to hold a national census. The commission was a failure and was disbanded in 1834. In the ensuing years, provincial governments were tasked with collecting census information, but their census reports were often incomplete or not submitted at all. In 1851, another attempt at a nationwide census failed when rioting broke out. This was the result of the erroneous belief among Brazilians of mixed-race descent that the survey was a subterfuge designed to enslave anyone having African blood.

Estimated population of Brazil in the 1868:

Province	Capital	Population	Slaves	Army and police	National guard
Neutral Municipality		400.000	50.000	10.000	
Amazonas	Manaus	70.000	5.000		2.700
Grão-Pará	Belém do Pará	250.000	15.000	1.000	23.000
Maranhão	São Luís	400.000	70.000	1.000	28.000
Piauí	Teresina	175.000	10.000	650	20.000
Ceará	Fortaleza	486.000	30.000	286	40.000
Rio Grande do Norte	Natal	210.000	20.000	100	20.000
Paraíba	João Pessoa	260.000	5.000	400	21.000
Pernambuco	Recife	1,180,000	250.000	1.600	42.000
Alagoas	Maceió	250.000	45.000	429	25.000
Sergipe	Aracaju	250.000	50.000	200	2.000
Bahia	Salvador	1,200,000	250.000	2.400	110.000
Espírito Santo	Vitória, Espírito Santo	55.000	10.000	223	6.000
Rio de Janeiro	Niterói	850.000	200.000	2.400	43.000
São Paulo	São Paulo	800.000	60.000	679	40.000
Paraná	Curitiba	105.000	20.000	388	8.000
Santa Catarina	Florianópolis	120.000	15.000	100	9.000
São Pedro do Rio Grande do Sul	Porto Alegre	392.725	77.416	1.600	42.991
Minas Gerais	Ouro Preto	1,350,000	150.000	1.000	75.000
Goiás	Goiânia	200.000	15.000	300	13.000
Mato Grosso	Cuiabá	80.000	10.000		5.000
Brasil	Neutral Municipality	9,083,725	1,357,416		

The first true national census with exhaustive and broad coverage was carried out in 1872. The small number of people and small number of towns reported by the census reveal Brazil's enormous territory to have been sparsely populated. It showed Brazil as having a total population of 9,930,478 inhabitants. Estimates made by the government in prior decades showed 4,000,000 inhabitants in 1823 and gave a figure of 7,000,700 in 1854. The population was distributed across 20 provinces and the Neutral Municipality (the Empire's capital) with 641 municipalities.

Among the free population 23.4% of males and 13.4% of females were considered literate. Men represented 52% (5,123,869) of the total population. Figures for the population by age showed 24.6% were children younger than 10 years old; 21.1% were between 11 and 20; 32.9% were between 21 and 40; 8.4% were between 41 and 50; 12.8% were between 51 and 70; and lastly, only 3.4% were over 71. The residents in the combined northeast and southeast regions comprised 87.2% of the nation's population. The second national census was held in 1890 when the Brazilian republic was only a few months old. Its results showed that the population had grown to 14,333,915 inhabitants since the 1872 census.

=== Ethnic groups ===
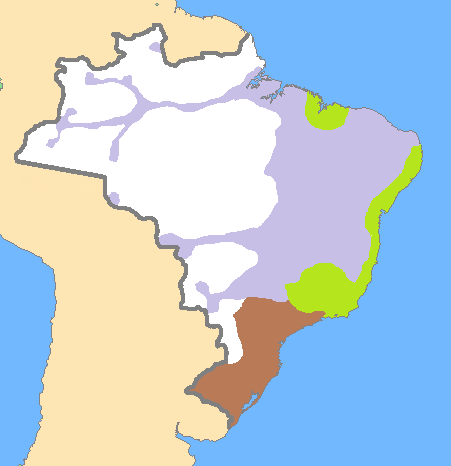
This map shows where ethnic groups predominated within Brazil: purple—caboclos; brown—whites; green—mulattoes; white—sparsely populated. Note: over 80% of the population lived along the coastline

Four ethnic groups were recognized in Imperial Brazil: white, black, Indian, and brown. Brown (Portuguese: pardo) was a designation for multiracial Brazilians which is still officially used, though some scholars prefer the term "mixed one" (Portuguese: mestiço). The term denotes a broad category which includes caboclos (descendants of whites and Indians), mulattoes (descendants of whites and blacks) and cafuzos (descendants of blacks and Indians).

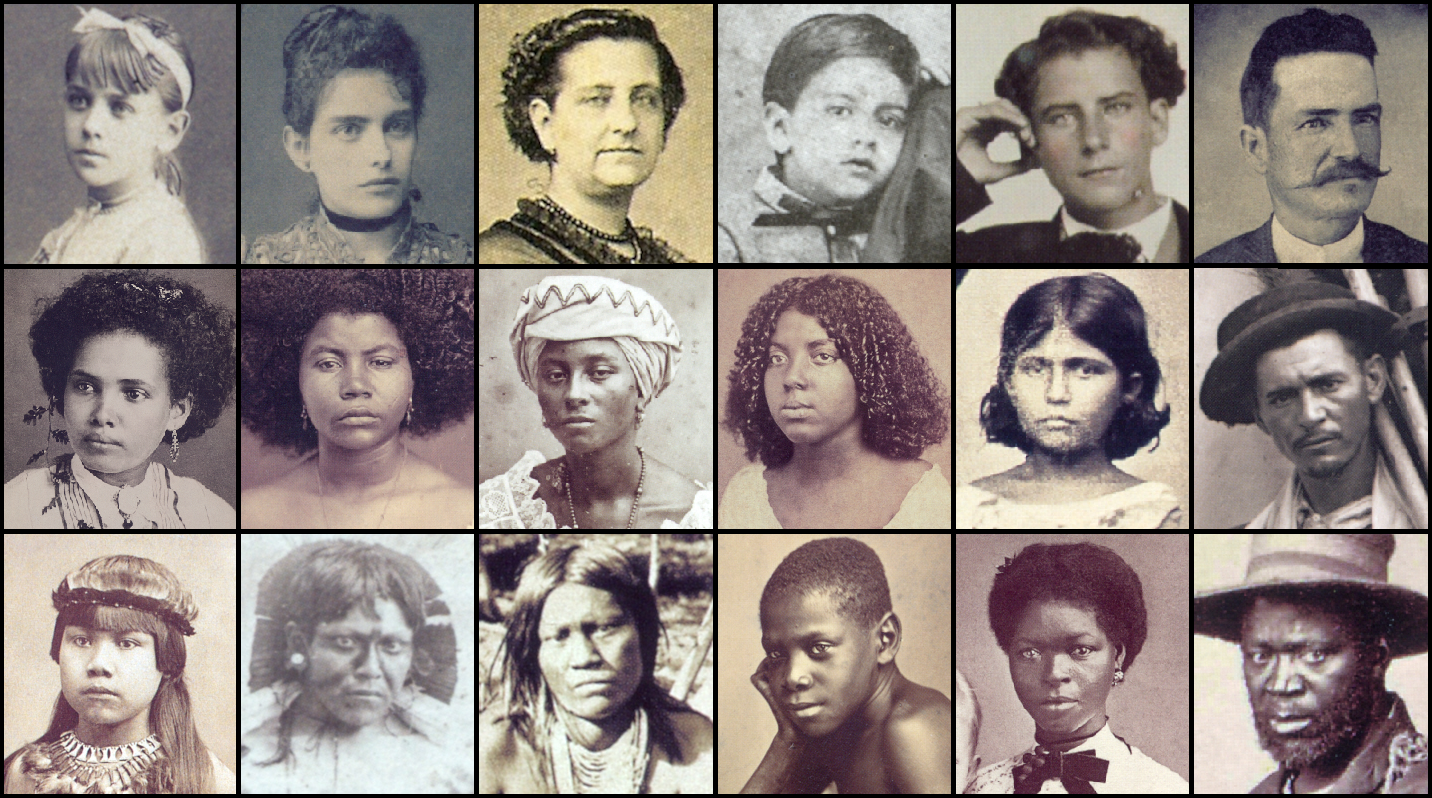
19th-century Brazilians. 1st row: White Brazilians. 2nd row: Brown Brazilians (left to right: two female mulattoes, two female cafuzos and a caboclo girl and man). 3rd row: three Brazilian Indians of different tribes followed by Afro-Brazilians of distinct ethnic background

The caboclos formed the majority of the population in the Northern, Northeastern and Central-Western regions. A large mulatto population inhabited the eastern coast of the northeastern region from Bahia to Paraíba and were also present in northern Maranhão, southern Minas Gerais, eastern Rio de Janeiro and in Espírito Santo. The cafuzos were the smallest and most difficult to distinguish from the two other mixed-race subgroups since the descendants of caboclos and mulattoes also fell into this category and were found in the northeast sertão (hinterland). These groups may still be found in the same areas today.

White Brazilians descended from the original Portuguese settlers. From the 1870s onwards this ethnic group also included other European immigrants: mainly Italians and Germans. Although whites could be found throughout the country, they were the majority group in the southern region and in São Paulo province. Whites also comprised a significant proportion (40%) of the population in the northeastern provinces of Ceará, Paraíba, and Rio Grande do Norte. Afro-Brazilians inhabited the same areas as mulattoes. The majority of the population of Rio de Janeiro, Minas Gerais, Espírito Santo, Bahia, Sergipe, Alagoas, and Pernambuco provinces (the last four having the smallest percentages of whites in the whole country—less than 30% in each) were black or brown. The Indians, or the indigenous peoples of Brazil, were found mainly in Piauí, Maranhão, Pará, and Amazonas.

Ethnic groups in Brazil (1835, 1872 and 1890)
Years	Whites	Browns	Blacks	Indians	Total
1835	24.4%	18.2%	51.4%		100%
1872	38.1%	38.3%	19.7%	3.9%	100%
1890	44.0%	32.4%	14.6%	9%	100%

Because of the existence of distinct racial and cultural communities, 19th century Brazil developed as a multi-ethnic nation. However, there is no reliable information available for the years prior to 1872. The first official national census was compiled by the government in 1872 showing that out of 9,930,479 inhabitants there were 38.1% whites, 38.3% browns, 19.7% blacks and 3.9% Indians. The second official national census in 1890 revealed that in a population of 14,333,915, 44% were whites, 32.4% browns, 14.6% blacks and 9% Indians.

=== European immigration ===
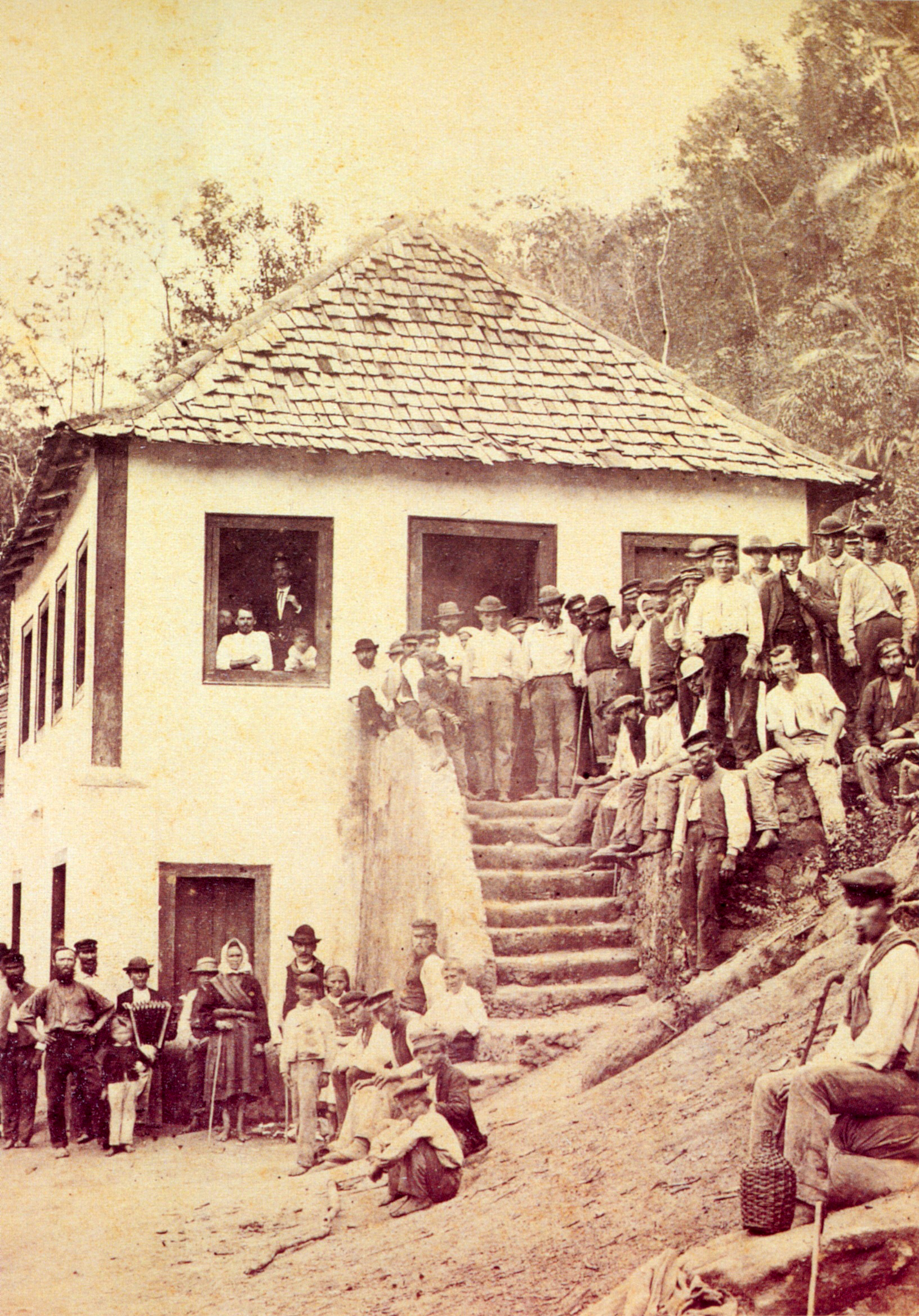
German and Luxembourger immigrants in Santa Leopoldina colony in Espírito Santo province (southeast region), 1875

Prior to 1808, the Portuguese were the only European people to settle Brazil in significant numbers. Although Italians, British, Germans and Spanish had previously immigrated to Brazil, they had only done so as a small number of individuals or in very small groups. These earliest non-Portuguese settlers did not have a significant impact on the culture of Portugal's Brazilian colony. The situation changed after 1808 when King John VI began to encourage immigration from European countries outside Portugal.

The first to arrive in numbers were the Swiss, of whom some 2,000 settled in Rio de Janeiro province (the southeast) during 1818. They were followed by Germans and Irish, who immigrated to Brazil in the 1820s. German settlers gravitated mostly to the southern provinces, where the environment was more like their homeland. In the 1830s, due to the instability of the Regency, European immigration ground to a halt, only recovering after Pedro II took the reins of government and the country entered a period of peace and prosperity. Farmers in the southeast, enriched by lucrative coffee exports, created the "partnership system" (a form of indentured servitude) to attract immigrants. The scheme endured until the end of the 1850s, when the system collapsed and was abandoned. The failure was rooted in the large debts European settlers incurred to subsidize their travel and settlement expenses, leaving them as virtual slaves to their employers. Immigration suffered another decline during the Paraguayan War, which lasted from 1864 to 1870.

Immigrant numbers soared during the 1870s in what came to be called the "great immigration". Up to that point, around 10,000 Europeans arrived in Brazil annually, but after 1872, their numbers increased dramatically. It is estimated by the Brazilian Institute of Geography and Statistics that 500,000 Europeans immigrated to Brazil between 1808 and 1883. The figure for European settlers arriving between 1884 and 1893 climbed to 883,668. The number of Europeans immigrating continued to rise in the following decades, with 862,100 between 1894 and 1903; and 1,006,617 between 1904 and 1913.

From 1872 until 1879, the nationalities forming the bulk of the new settlers were composed of Portuguese (31.2%), Italians (25.8%), Germans (8.1%) and Spanish (1.9%). In the 1880s, Italians would surpass the Portuguese (61.8% to 23.3% respectively), and the Spanish would displace the Germans (6.7% to 4.2% respectively). Other, smaller groups also arrived, including Russians, Poles and Hungarians. Since nearly all European immigrants settled in the southeastern and southern areas of the Empire, ethnic distribution, already unequal before the mass immigration, became even more divergent between regions. For a nation that had a small, widely scattered population (4,000,000 in 1823 and 14,333,915 in 1890), the immigration of more than 1,380,000 Europeans had a tremendous effect upon the country's ethnic composition. In 1872, the year of the first reliable national census, white Brazilians represented just over a third (38.1%) of the total population; in 1890, they had increased to a little under half (44.0%) of all Brazilians.

=== Slavery ===
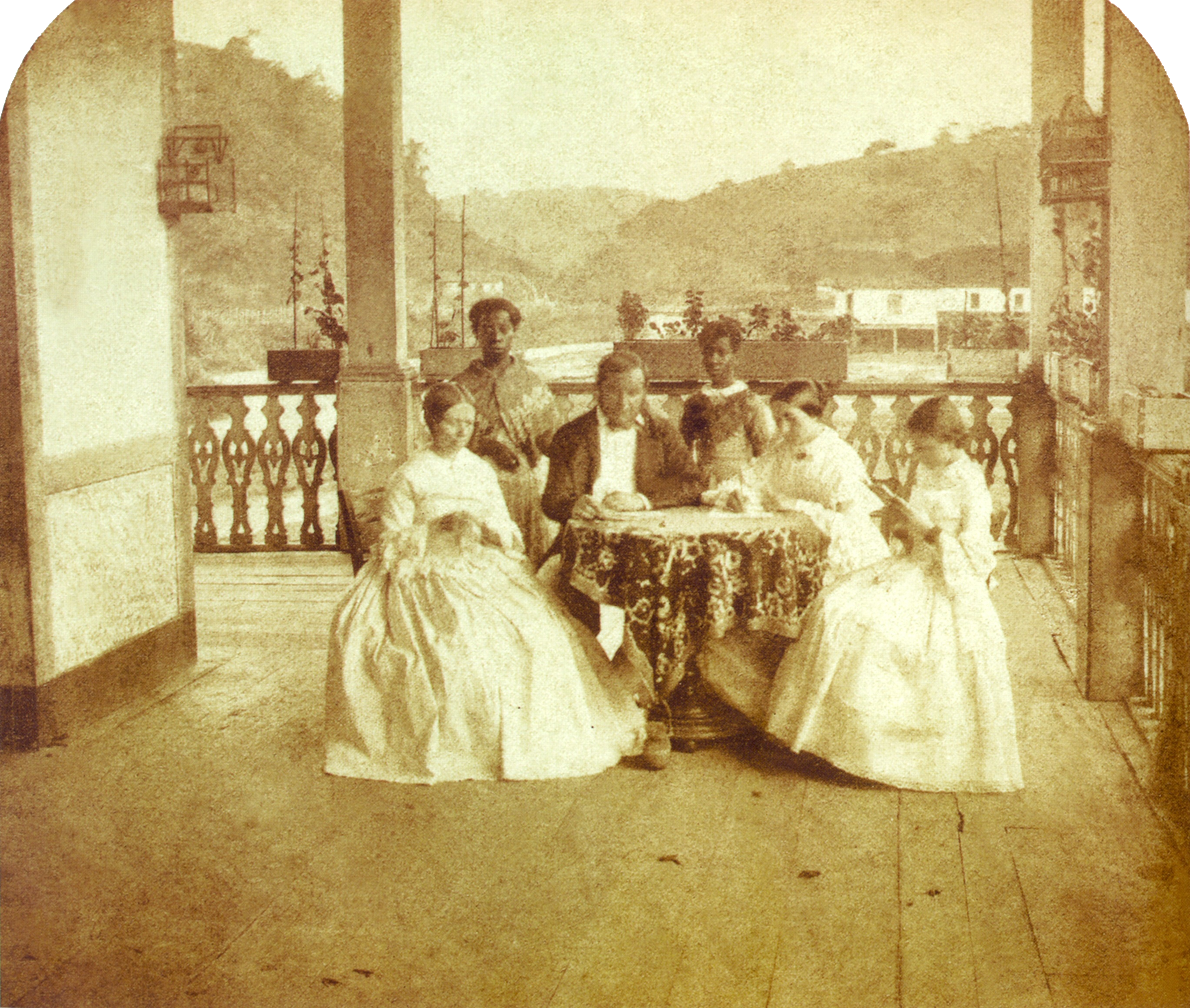
A Brazilian family and its female house slaves, c. 1860

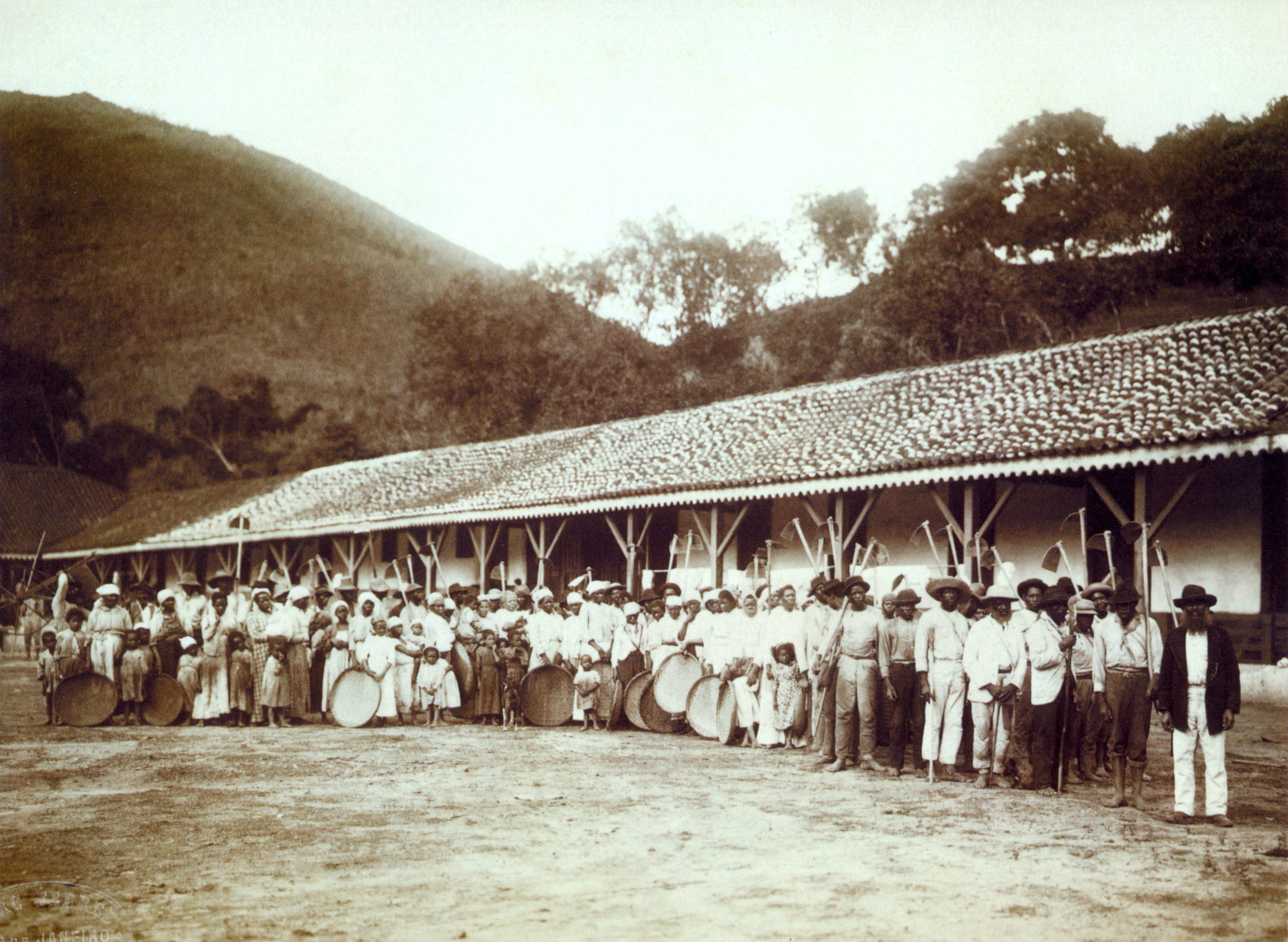
Slaves and their free children on a coffee farm in Brazil, c. 1885

In 1823, a year after independence, slaves made up 29% of the population of Brazil, a figure which fell throughout the lifetime of the Empire: from 24% in 1854, to 15.2% in 1872, and finally to less than 5% in 1887—the year before slavery was completely abolished. Slaves were mostly adult males from southwestern Africa. Slaves brought to Brazil differed ethnically, religiously and linguistically, each identifying primarily with his or her own nation of origin, rather than by a shared African ethnicity. Some of the slaves brought to the Americas had been captured while fighting intertribal wars in Africa and had then been sold to slave dealers.

Slaves and their descendants were usually found in regions devoted to producing exports for foreign markets. Sugarcane plantations on the eastern coast of the northeast region during the 16th and 17th centuries are typical of economic activities dependent on slave labor. In northern Maranhão province, slave labor was used in cotton and rice production in the 18th century. In this period, slaves were also exploited in Minas Gerais province where gold was extracted. Slavery was also common in Rio de Janeiro and São Paulo during the 19th century for the cultivation of coffee which became vital to the national economy. The prevalence of slavery was not geographically uniform across Brazil. Around 1870 only five provinces (Rio de Janeiro with 30%, Bahia with 15%, Minas Gerais with 14%, São Paulo with 7% and Rio Grande do Sul also with 7%) held 73% of the nation's total slave population. These were followed by Pernambuco (with 6%) and Alagoas (with 4%). Among the remaining 13 provinces none individually had even 3%.

Most slaves worked as plantation laborers. Relatively few Brazilians owned slaves and most small and medium-sized farms employed free workers. Slaves could be found scattered throughout society in other capacities: some were used as house servants, farmers, miners, prostitutes, gardeners and in many other roles. Many emancipated slaves went on to acquire slaves and there were even cases of slaves who had their own slaves. While slaves were usually black or mulatto there were reported cases of slaves who appeared to be of European descent—the product of generations of inter-ethnic sexual relations between male slave owners and their female mulatto slaves. Even the harshest slave owners adhered to a long-established practice of selling slaves along with their families, taking care not to separate individuals. Slaves were regarded by law as properties. The ones who were freed immediately became citizens with all civil rights guaranteed—the only exception being that, until 1881, freed slaves were barred from voting in elections, although their children and descendants could vote.

=== Nobility ===
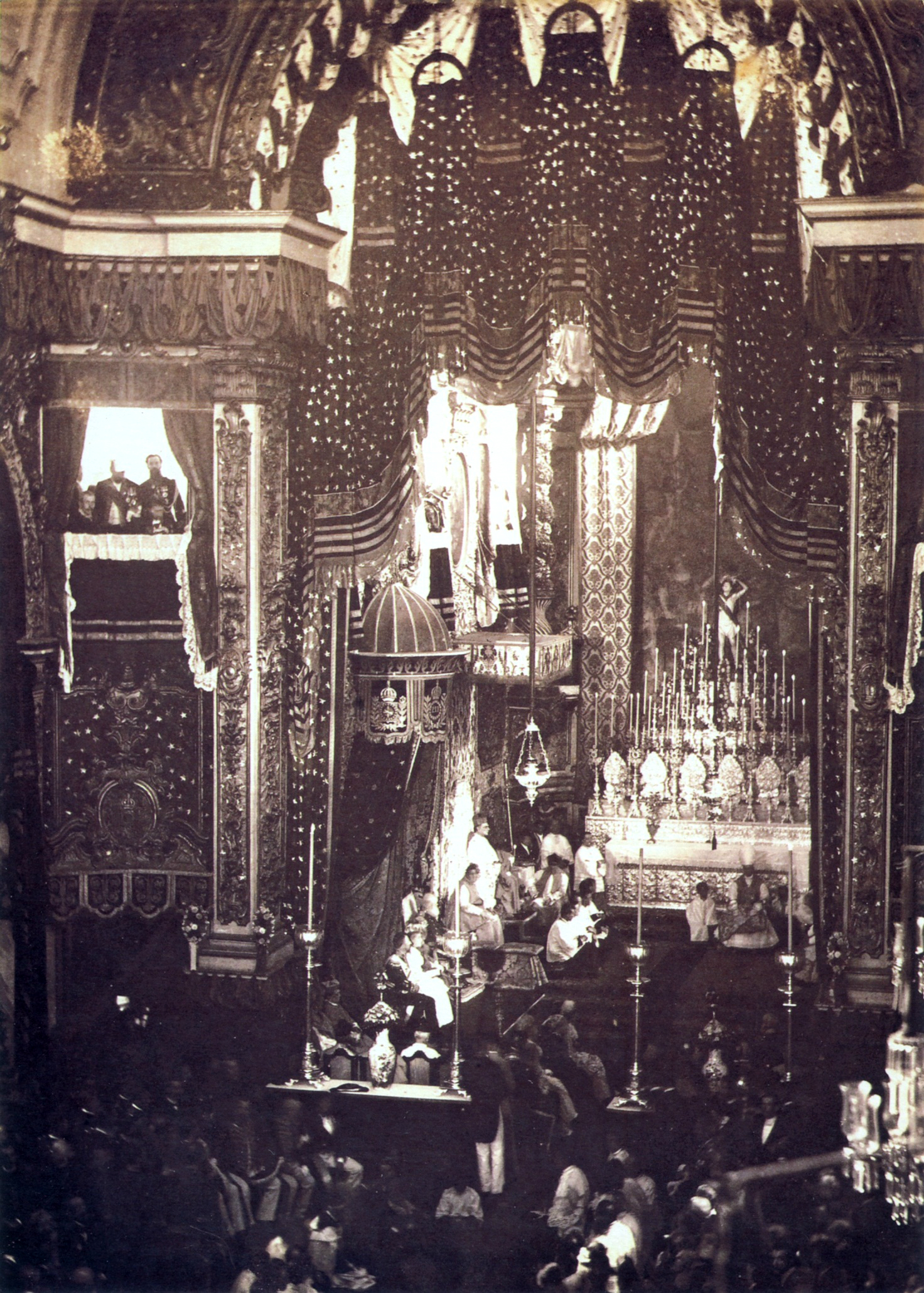
A state ceremony in the Old Cathedral of Rio de Janeiro; the attendees are wearing court dress

The nobility of Brazil differed markedly from its counterparts in Europe: noble titles were not hereditary, with the exception of members of the Imperial Family, and those who had received a noble title were not considered to belong to a separate social class, and received no appanages, stipends or emoluments. However, many ranks, traditions, and regulations in Brazil's system of nobility were co-opted directly from the Portuguese aristocracy. During Pedro I's reign there were no clear requisites for someone to be ennobled. During Pedro II's reign (apart from the Regency period during which the regent could not grant titles or honors) the nobility evolved into a meritocracy with titles granted in recognition of an individual's outstanding service to the Empire or for the public good. Noble rank did not represent "recognition of illustrious ancestry."

It was the emperor's right, as head of the executive branch, to grant titles and honors. The titles of nobility were, in ascending order: baron, viscount, count, marquis, and duke. Apart from position in the hierarchy there were other distinctions between the ranks: counts, marquises and dukes were considered "Grandees of the Empire" while the titles of barons and viscounts could be bestowed "with Greatness" or "without Greatness". All ranks of the Brazilian nobility were to be addressed as Excelência (Excellency).

Between 1822 and 1889, 986 people were ennobled. Only three became dukes: Auguste de Beauharnais, 2nd Duke of Leuchtenberg (as Duke of Santa Cruz, brother-in-law to Pedro I), Dona Isabel Maria de Alcântara Brasileira (as Duchess of Goiás, illegitimate daughter of Pedro I) and lastly Luís Alves de Lima e Silva (as Duke of Caxias, commander-in-chief during the Paraguayan War). The other titles granted were as follows: 47 marquises, 51 counts, 146 viscounts "with Greatness", 89 viscounts "without Greatness", 135 barons "with Greatness" and 740 barons "without Greatness" resulting in a total of 1,211 noble titles. There were fewer nobles than noble titles because many were elevated more than once during their lifetime, such as the Duke of Caxias who was first made a baron, then a count, then a marquis and finally was elevated to a duke. Grants of nobility were not limited to male Brazilians: Thomas Cochrane, 10th Earl of Dundonald, a Scot, was made Marquis of Maranhão for his role in the Brazilian War of Independence, and 29 women received grants of nobility in their own right. As well as being unrestricted by gender, no racial distinctions were made in conferring noble status. Caboclos, mulattoes, blacks and even Indians were ennobled.

The lesser nobility, who were untitled, were made up of members of the Imperial Orders. There were six of these: the Order of Christ, the Order of Saint Benedict of Aviz, the Order of Saint James of the Sword, the Order of the Southern Cross, the Order of Pedro I and the Order of the Rose. The first three had grades of honor beyond the Grand Master (reserved for the Emperor only): knight, commander and grand cross. The latter three, however, had different ranks: the Order of the Southern Cross with four, the Order of the Rose with six, and the Order of Pedro I with three.

=== Religion ===
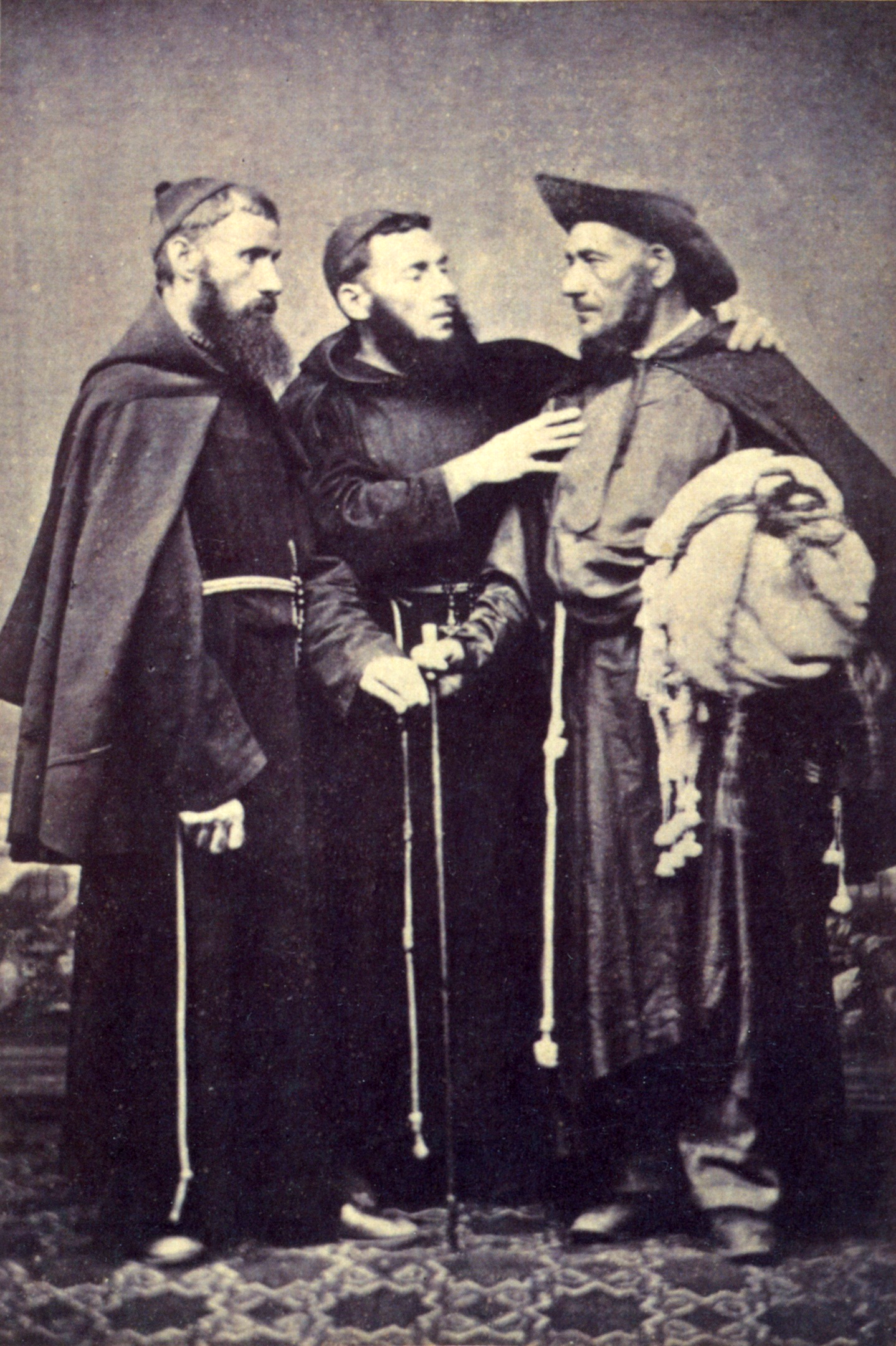
Brazilian friars c. 1875

Article five of the Constitution declared Catholicism to be the state religion. However, the clergy had long been understaffed, undisciplined and poorly educated, all of which led to a general loss of respect for the Catholic Church. During Pedro II's reign, the Imperial government embarked upon a program of reform designed to address these deficiencies. As Catholicism was the official religion, the emperor exercised a great deal of control over Church affairs and paid clerical stipends, appointed parish priests, nominated bishops, ratified papal bulls and supervised seminaries. In pursuing reform, the government selected bishops whose moral fitness, stance on education and support for reform met with their approval. However, as more capable men began to fill the clerical ranks, resentment of government control over the Church increased. Catholic clerics moved closer to the pope and his doctrines. This resulted in the Religious Issue, a series of clashes during the 1870s between the clergy and the government, since the former wanted a more direct relationship with Rome and the latter sought to maintain its oversight of Church affairs.

The Constitution did allow followers of other, non-Catholic, faiths to practice their religious beliefs, albeit only in private. The construction of non-Catholic places of worship was officially forbidden. From the outset these restrictions were ignored by both the citizenry and authorities. In Belém, Pará's capital, the first synagogue was built in 1824. Jews migrated to Brazil soon after its independence and settled mainly in the northeastern provinces of Bahia and Pernambuco and in the northern provinces of Amazonas and Pará. Other Jewish groups came from the Alsace–Lorraine region of Germany and from Russia. By the 1880s, there were several Jewish communities and synagogues scattered throughout Brazil.

The Protestants were another group that began settling in Brazil at the beginning of the 19th century. The first Protestants were English, and an Anglican church was opened in Rio de Janeiro in 1820. Others were established afterwards in São Paulo, Pernambuco and Bahia provinces. They were followed by German and Swiss Lutherans who settled in the South and Southwest regions and built their own houses of worship. Following the U.S. Civil War in the 1860s, immigrants from the southern United States seeking to escape Reconstruction settled in São Paulo. Several American churches sponsored missionary activities, including Lutherans, Baptists, Congregationalists, and Methodists.

Among African slaves, Catholicism was the religion of the majority. Most slaves came originally from the midwestern and southwestern portions of the African coast. For over four centuries this region had been the subject of Christian mission activities. Some Africans and their descendants, however, held onto elements of polytheistic religious traditions by merging them with Catholicism. This resulted in the creation of syncretic creeds such as Candomblé. Islam was also practiced among a small minority of African slaves, although it was harshly repressed and by the end of the 19th century had been completely extinguished. By the beginning of the 19th century, the Indians in most of eastern Brazil had been either assimilated or decimated. Some tribes resisted assimilation and either fled farther west, where they were able to maintain their diverse polytheistic beliefs, or were restricted to aldeamentos (reservations), where they eventually converted to Catholicism.

== Culture ==
=== Visual arts ===
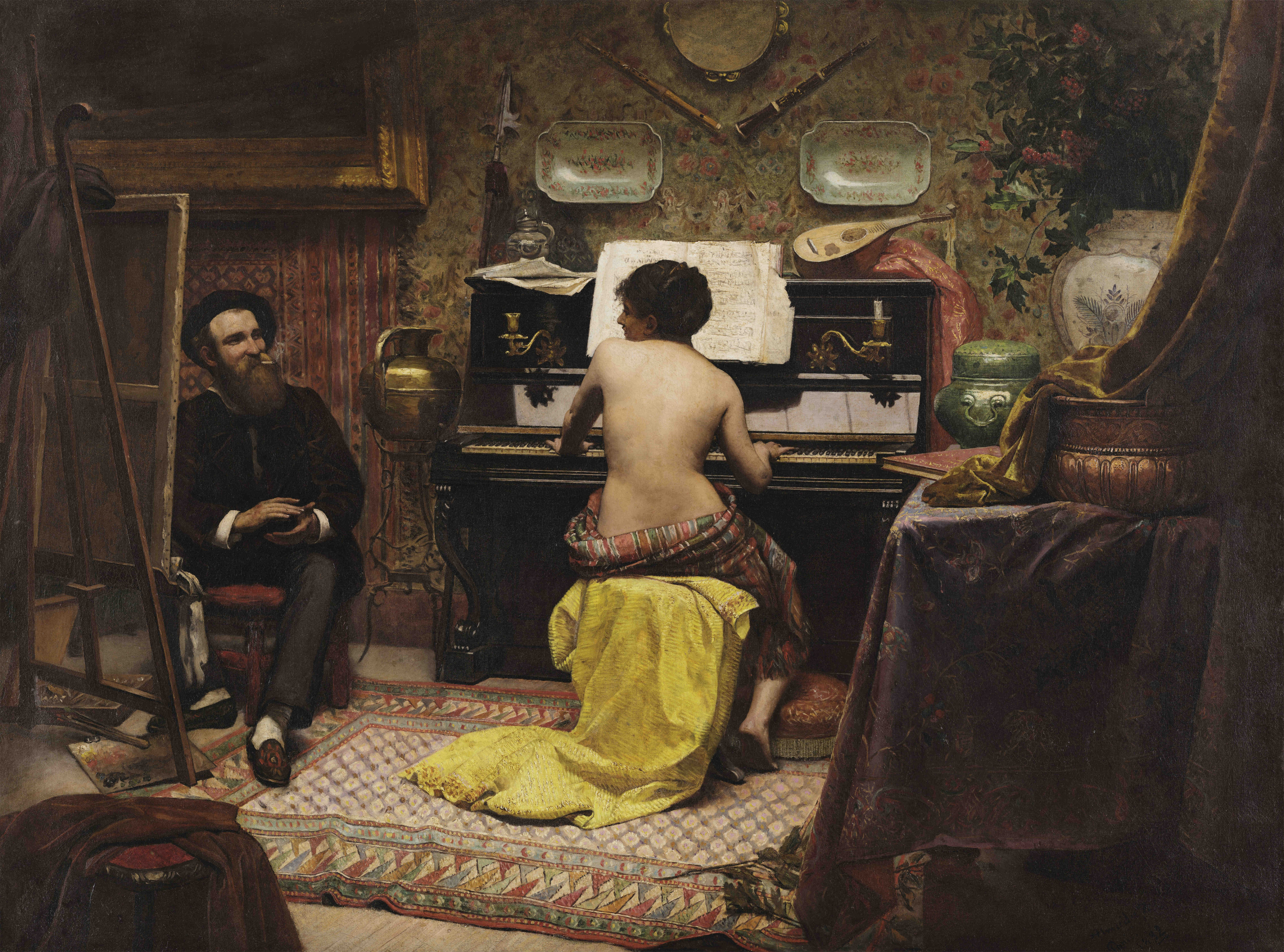
O descanso do modelo (The model's rest), by Almeida Júnior, 1882

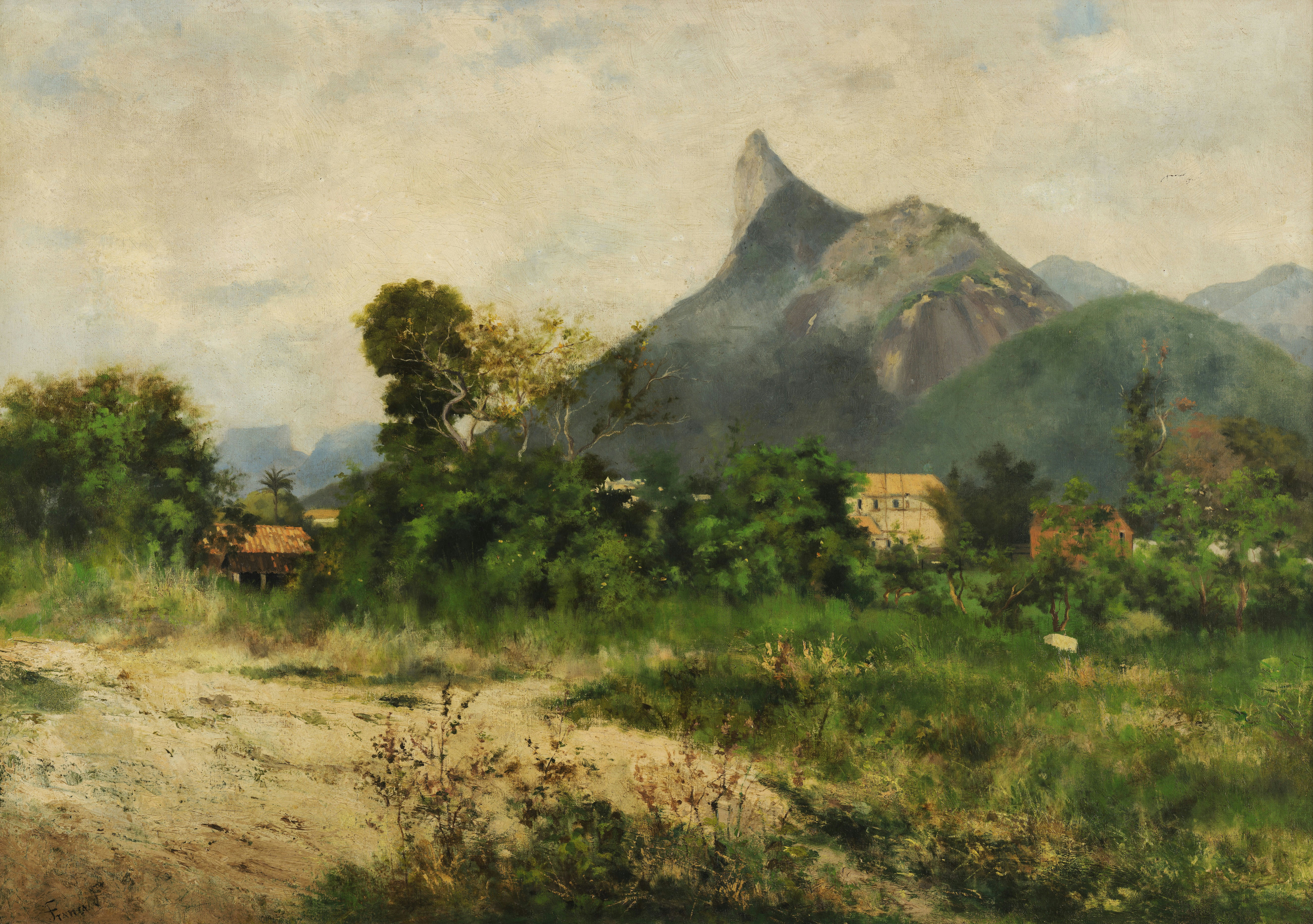
Morro da Viúva (Widow's mount), by França Júnior, c. 1888

According to historian Ronald Raminelli, "visual arts underwent huge innovations in the Empire in comparison to the colonial period." With independence in 1822, painting, sculpture and architecture were influenced by national symbols and the monarchy, as both surpassed religious themes in their importance. The previously dominant old Baroque style was superseded by Neoclassicism. New developments appeared, such as the use of iron in architecture and the appearance of lithography and photography, which revitalized the visual arts.

The government's creation of the Imperial Academy of Fine Arts in the 1820s played a pivotal role in influencing and expanding the visual arts in Brazil, mainly by educating generations of artists but also by serving as a stylistic guideline. The academy's origins lay in the foundation of the Escola Real das Ciências, Artes e Ofícios (Royal School of the Sciences, Arts and Crafts) in 1816 by the Portuguese King John VI. Its members—of whom the most famous was Jean-Baptiste Debret—were French émigrées who worked as painters, sculptors, musicians and engineers. The school's main goal was to encourage French aesthetics and the Neoclassical style to replace the prevalent baroque style. Plagued by a lack of funds since its inception, the school was later renamed as the Academy of Fine Arts in 1820, and in 1824 received its final name under the Empire: Imperial Academy of Fine Arts.

It was only following Pedro II's majority in 1840, however, that the academy became a powerhouse, part of the Emperor's greater scheme of fomenting a national culture and consequently uniting all Brazilians in a common sense of nationhood. Pedro II would sponsor the Brazilian culture through several public institutions funded by the government (not restricted to the Academy of Fine Arts), such as Brazilian Historic and Geographic Institute and Imperial Academy of Music and National Opera. That sponsorship would pave the way not only for the careers of artists, but also for those engaged in other fields, including historians such as Francisco Adolfo de Varnhagen and musicians such as the operatic composer Antônio Carlos Gomes.

By the 1840s, Romanticism had largely supplanted Neoclassicism, not only in painting, but also in sculpture and architecture. The academy did not resume its role of simply providing education: prizes, medals, scholarships in foreign countries and funding were used as incentives. Among its staff and students were some of the most renowned Brazilian artists, including Simplício Rodrigues de Sá, Félix Taunay, Manuel de Araújo Porto-alegre, Pedro Américo, Victor Meirelles, Rodolfo Amoedo, Almeida Júnior, Rodolfo Bernardelli, and João Zeferino da Costa. In the 1880s, after having been long regarded as the official style of the academy, Romanticism declined, and other styles were explored by a new generation of artists. Among the new genres was Landscape art, the most famous exponents of which were Georg Grimm, Giovanni Battista Castagneto, França Júnior, and Antônio Parreiras. Another style which gained popularity in the fields of painting and architecture was Eclecticism.

=== Literature and theater ===
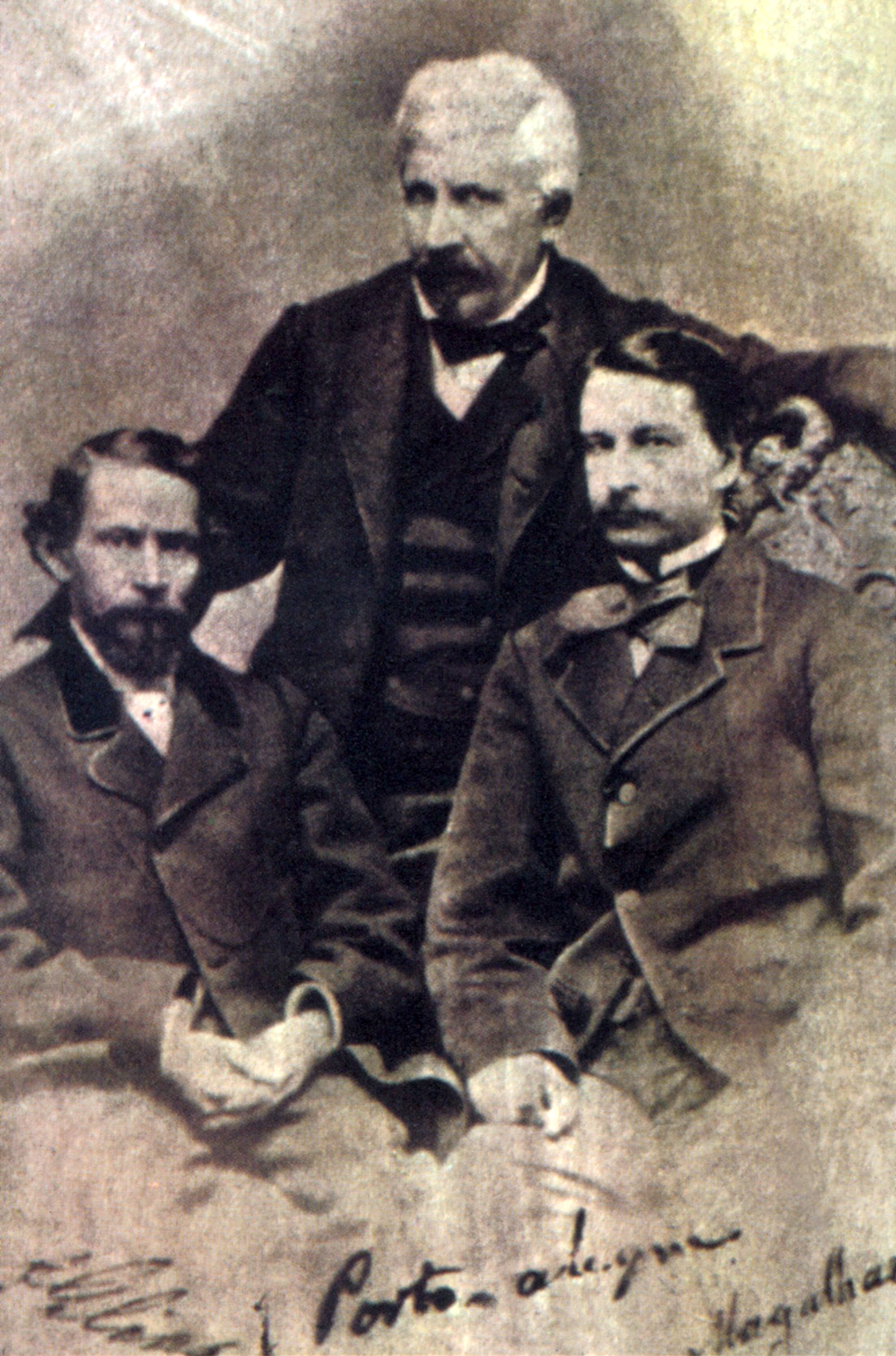
A photograph dating from c. 1858, showing three major Brazilian Romantic writers. From left to right: Gonçalves Dias, Manuel de Araújo Porto Alegre and Gonçalves de Magalhães

In the first years after independence, Brazilian literature was still heavily influenced by Portuguese literature and its predominant Neoclassical style. In 1837, Gonçalves de Magalhães published the first work of Romanticism in Brazil, beginning a new era in the nation. The next year, 1838, saw the first play performed by Brazilians with a national theme, which marked the birth of Brazilian theater. Until then themes were often based on European works even if not performed by foreign actors. Romanticism at that time was regarded as the literary style that best fitted Brazilian literature, which could reveal its uniqueness when compared to foreign literature. During the 1830s and 1840s, "a network of newspapers, journals, book publishers and printing houses emerged which together with the opening of theaters in the major towns brought into being what could be termed, but for the narrowness of its scope, a national culture".

Romanticism reached its apogee between the late 1850s and the early 1870s as it divided into several branches, including Indianism and sentimentalism. The most influential literary style in 19th-century Brazil, many of the most renowned Brazilian writers were exponents of Romanticism: Manuel de Araújo Porto Alegre, Gonçalves Dias, Gonçalves de Magalhães, José de Alencar, Bernardo Guimarães, Álvares de Azevedo, Casimiro de Abreu, Castro Alves, Joaquim Manuel de Macedo, Manuel Antônio de Almeida, and Alfredo d'Escragnolle Taunay. In theater, the most famous Romanticist playwrights were Martins Pena and Joaquim Manuel de Macedo. Brazilian Romanticism did not have the same success in theater as it had in literature, as most of the plays were either Neoclassic tragedies or Romantic works from Portugal or translations from Italian, French or Spanish. After the opening of the Brazilian Dramatic Conservatory in 1845, the government gave financial aid to national theater companies in exchange for staging plays in Portuguese.

By the 1880s, Romanticism was superseded by new literary styles. The first to appear was Realism, which had among its most notable writers Machado de Assis and Raul Pompeia. Newer styles that coexisted with Realism, Naturalism and Parnassianism, were both connected to the former's evolution. Among the best-known Naturalists were Aluísio Azevedo and Adolfo Caminha. Notable Parnassians were Gonçalves Crespo, Alberto de Oliveira, Raimundo Correia, and Olavo Bilac. Brazilian theater became influenced by Realism in 1855, decades earlier than the style's impact upon literature and poetry. Famous Realist playwrights included José de Alencar, Quintino Bocaiuva, Joaquim Manuel de Macedo, Júlia Lopes de Almeida, and Maria Angélica Ribeiro. Brazilian plays staged by national companies competed for audiences alongside foreign plays and companies. Performing arts in Imperial Brazil also encompassed the staging of musical duets, dancing, gymnastics, comedy and farces. Less prestigious, but more popular with the working classes were puppeteers and magicians, as well as the circus, with its travelling companies of performers, including acrobats, trained animals, illusionists, and other stunt-oriented artists.

== See also ==
- Monarchies in the Americas
- List of titles and honours of the Brazilian Crown
- Imperial Regalia of Brazil
- Imperial Crown of Brazil
- Second Reign
- First Reign
