= 1884 Brazilian parliamentary election =

- 1 December 1884

125 members of the Chamber of Deputies
	First party	Second party	Third party
Party	Liberal	Conservative	PRP
Seats won	67	55	3
Seat change	▼7	▲7
- Results by Electoral District

Parliamentary elections were held in the Empire of Brazil on 1 December 1884 to elect members of the 19th legislature of the Chamber of Deputies. These were the second direct elections held in the country after the Saraiva Law was enacted (Law No. 3,029 of 9 January 1881). The Liberal Party won 67 seats, the Conservative Party won 55, and the Republican Party won 3. The chamber was later dissolved on 26 September 1885. The province of Pará was redivided into 6 districts.

== Results ==
Party	Seats	+/–
Liberal Party	67	–7
Conservative Party	55	+7
Paulista Republican Party	3	–
Total	125	+3
Source: Câmara dos Deputados 1889, p. 385

=== Results by province ===
Provinces and Neutral Municipality	Districts	Liberals	Conservatives	Republicans	Elected votes	Total votes
Alagoas	5	3	2	–	2,049	3,576
Amazonas	2	2	–	–	453	760
Bahia	14	9	5	–	1,288	13,652
Ceará	8	5	3	–	3,857	6,989
Espírito Santo	2	1	1	–	740	1,445
Goiás	2	2	–	–	1,466	2,134
Maranhão	6	3	3	–	2,223	3,609
Mato Grosso	2	2	–	–	673	1,018
Minas Gerais	20	12	7	1	11,410	19,658
Neutral Municipality and Rio de Janeiro	12	3	9	–	7,845	13,211
Pará	6	1	5	–	2,425	4,108
Paraíba	5	2	3	–	2,369	3,952
Paraná	2	1	1	–	1,256	1,994
Pernambuco	13	6	7	–	6,044	11,178
Piauí	3	2	1	–	1,643	2,907
Rio Grande do Norte	2	2	–	–	1,502	2,821
Rio Grande do Sul	6	6	–	–	5,990	10,624
Santa Catarina	2	2	–	–	1,194	2,179
São Paulo	9	2	5	2	6,900	12,522
Sergipe	4	1	3	–	1,503	2,939
Source: Câmara dos Deputados 1889, p. 385
