= President of the Chamber of Deputies (Brazil) =

Political office of Brazil

- Presidente da Câmara dos Deputados
- Logo of the Chamber

- Flag of Brazil

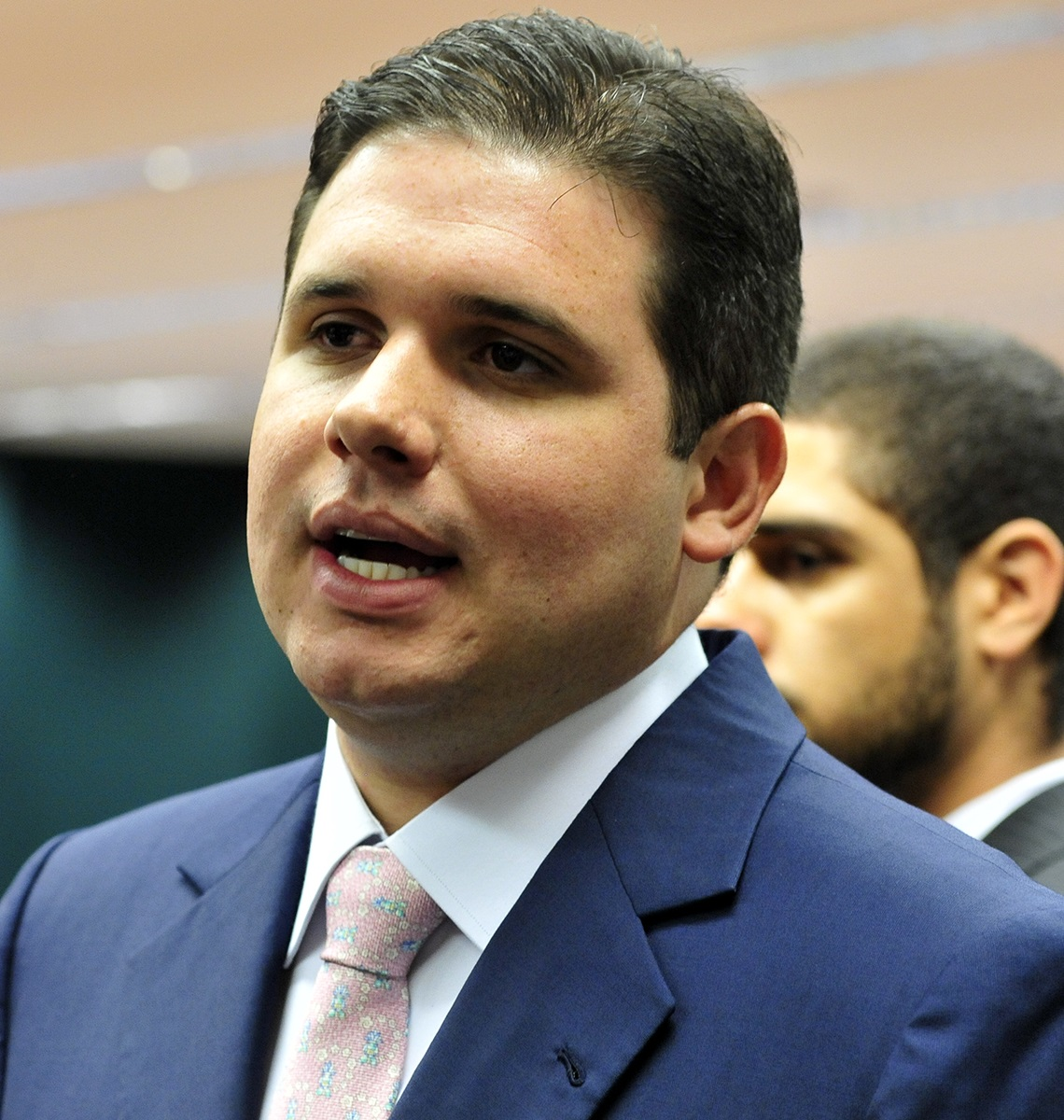
- Incumbent; Hugo Motta since 1 February 2025
- National Congress; Chamber of Deputies
- Style: Mr. President, or simply President (informal); The Most Excellent Mr. President of the Chamber (formal); His Excellency (alternative formal, diplomatic)
- Status: Presiding officer
- Member of: National Defense Council; Council of the Republic
- Residence: Lago Sul, Brasília, Federal District
- Seat: National Congress, Brasília, Federal District
- Appointer: Chamber of Deputies; Elected by the Chamber
- Term length: Two years, not eligible for re-election immediately
- Constituting instrument: Constitution of Brazil
- Formation: 25 March 1824; 202 years ago
- First holder: Luís Pereira da Nóbrega Sousa Coutinho
- Succession: Second
- Salary: R$ 405,156 annually

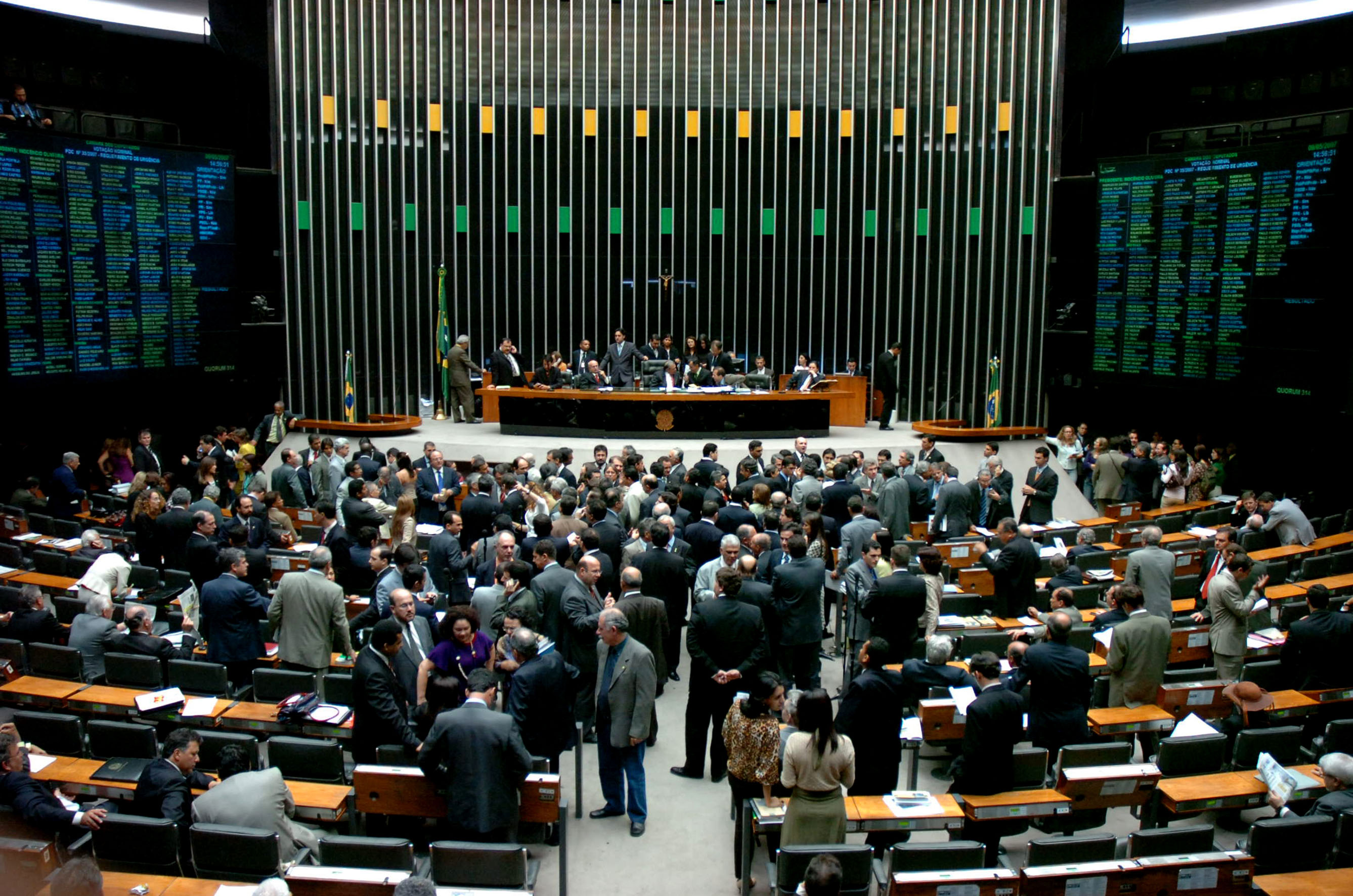
The Chamber of Deputies in session

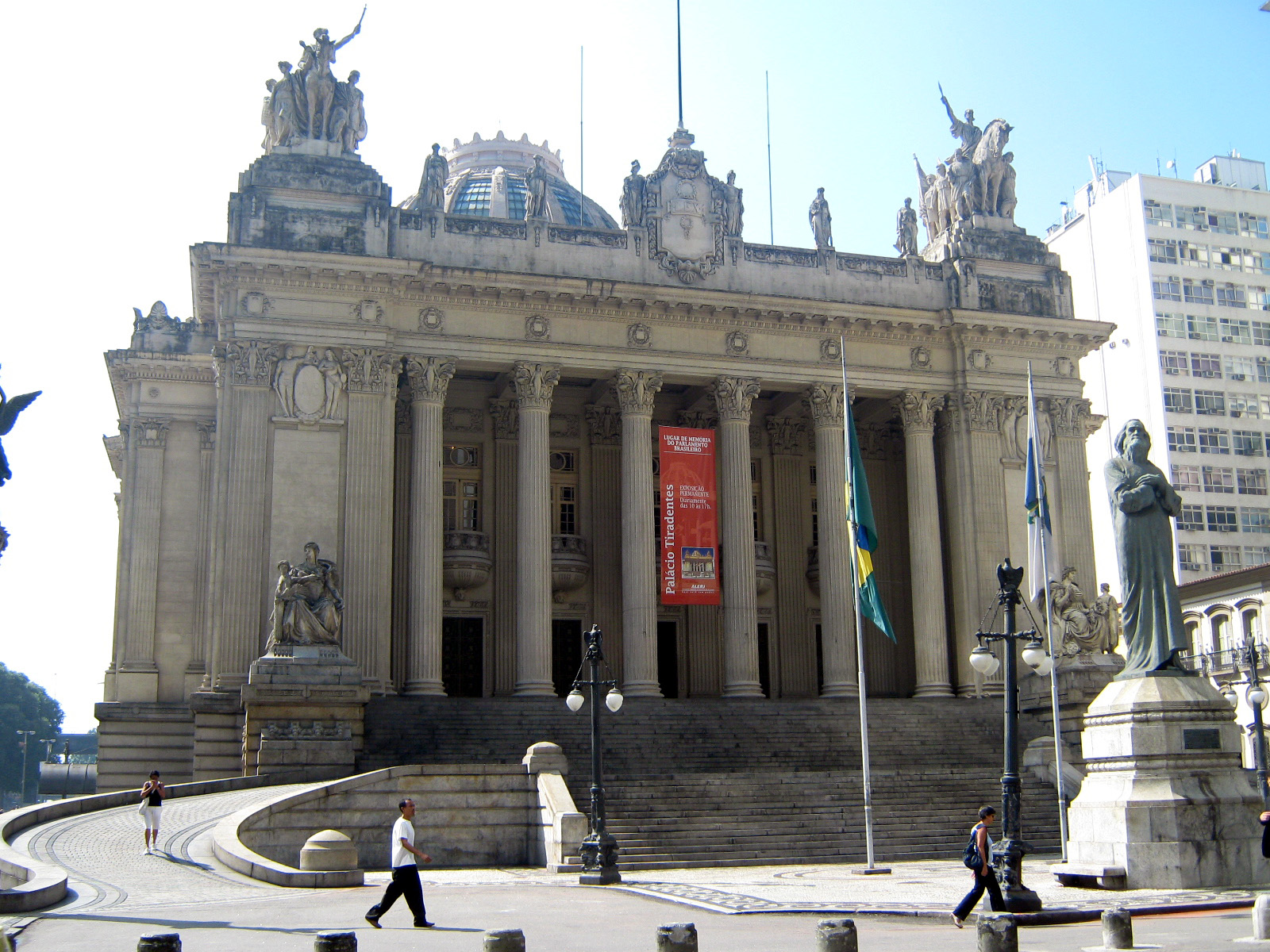
The Tiradentes Palace, in Rio de Janeiro, was the building of the Brazilian Parliament from 1926 until 1960

The President of the Chamber of Deputies (Portuguese: Presidente da Câmara dos Deputados) is the speaker of the lower house of the National Congress of Brazil, elected by his peers for a two-year term. The president is assisted by a board of directors.

Hugo Motta, a deputy from Paraíba and a member of Republicanos, currently holds the office since 1 February 2025.

== List of presidents of the Chamber of Deputies ==
=== Empire of Brazil (1826–1889) ===
No.	Portrait	President	Took office	Left office	Time in office	Province
1	Luís da Nóbrega Sousa Coutinho	Luís da Nóbrega Sousa Coutinho (1760–1826)	8 May 1826	21 December 1826	227 days	Rio de Janeiro
2	Francisco de Paula Sousa e Melo	Francisco de Paula Sousa e Melo (1791–1854)	4 May 1827	2 June 1827	29 days	Rio de Janeiro
3	Pedro de Araújo Lima, Marquis of Olinda	Pedro de Araújo Lima, Marquis of Olinda (1793–1870)	2 June 1827	5 May 1828	338 days	Pernambuco
4	José da Costa Carvalho, Marquis of Monte Alegre	José da Costa Carvalho, Marquis of Monte Alegre (1796–1860)	5 May 1828	6 July 1828	62 days	Bahia
5	Romualdo Antônio de Seixas, Marquis of Santa Cruz	Romualdo Antônio de Seixas, Marquis of Santa Cruz (1787–1860)	6 July 1828	4 May 1829	302 days	Grão-Pará
6	Pedro de Araújo Lima, Marquis of Olinda	Pedro de Araújo Lima, Marquis of Olinda (1793–1870)	4 May 1829	4 May 1830	1 year, 0 days	Pernambuco
7	José da Costa Carvalho, Marquis of Monte Alegre	José da Costa Carvalho, Marquis of Monte Alegre (1796–1860)	4 May 1830	3 July 1830	60 days	Bahia
8	José Ribeiro Soares da Rocha	José Ribeiro Soares da Rocha	3 July 1830	3 August 1830	31 days	Bahia
9	José da Costa Carvalho, Marquis of Monte Alegre	José da Costa Carvalho, Marquis of Monte Alegre (1796–1860)	3 August 1830	4 May 1831	274 days	Bahia
10	Martim Francisco Ribeiro de Andrada	Martim Francisco Ribeiro de Andrada (1775–1844)	4 May 1831	11 July 1831	68 days	Minas Gerais
11	José Martiniano de Alencar	José Martiniano de Alencar (1829–1877)	11 July 1831	16 May 1832	310 days	Ceará
12	Antonio Paulino Limpo de Abreu, Viscount of Abaeté	Antonio Paulino Limpo de Abreu, Viscount of Abaeté (1798–1883)	16 May 1832	2 May 1834	1 year, 351 days	Minas Gerais
13	Bento de Oliveira Braga	Bento de Oliveira Braga	2 May 1834	7 June 1834	36 days	Rio de Janeiro
14	Venâncio Henriques de Resende	Venâncio Henriques de Resende (1781–1866)	7 June 1834	11 August 1834	65 days	Pernambuco
15	Antônio Maria de Moura	Antônio Maria de Moura (1794–1842)	11 August 1834	2 May 1835	264 days	Minas Gerais
16	Pedro de Araújo Lima, Marquis of Olinda	Pedro de Araújo Lima, Marquis of Olinda (1793–1870)	2 May 1835	27 September 1837	2 years, 148 days	Pernambuco
17	Cândido José de Araújo Viana, Marquis of Sapucaí	Cândido José de Araújo Viana, Marquis of Sapucaí (1793–1875)	27 September 1837	6 May 1840	2 years, 222 days	Minas Gerais
18	Joaquim Marcelino de Brito	Joaquim Marcelino de Brito (1799–1879)	6 May 1840	16 May 1841	1 year, 10 days	Bahia
19	Romualdo Antônio de Seixas, Marquis of Santa Cruz	Romualdo Antônio de Seixas, Marquis of Santa Cruz (1787–1860)	16 May 1841	7 August 1841	83 days	Grão-Pará
20	Venâncio Henriques de Resende	Venâncio Henriques de Resende (1781–1866)	7 August 1841	4 April 1842	240 days	Pernambuco
21	Martim Francisco Ribeiro de Andrada	Martim Francisco Ribeiro de Andrada (1825–1886)	4 April 1842	12 January 1843	283 days	São Paulo
22	Manuel Inácio Cavalcanti de Lacerda, Baron of Pirapama	Manuel Inácio Cavalcanti de Lacerda, Baron of Pirapama (1799–1882)	12 January 1843	1 January 1845	1 year, 355 days	Pernambuco
23	Antonio Paulino Limpo de Abreu, Viscount of Abaeté	Antonio Paulino Limpo de Abreu, Viscount of Abaeté (1798–1883)	1 January 1845	21 June 1845	171 days	Minas Gerais
24	José Joaquim Fernandes Torres	José Joaquim Fernandes Torres (1797–1869)	21 June 1845	25 June 1846	1 year, 4 days	Minas Gerais
25	Francisco Muniz Tavares	Francisco Muniz Tavares (1793–1876)	25 June 1846	2 May 1847	311 days	Pernambuco
26	José Pedro Dias de Carvalho	José Pedro Dias de Carvalho (1808–1881)	2 May 1847	24 June 1848	1 year, 53 days	Minas Gerais
27	Antônio Pinto Chichorro da Gama	Antônio Pinto Chichorro da Gama (1800–1887)	24 June 1848	1 January 1850	1 year, 191 days	Pernambuco
28	Gabriel Mendes dos Santos	Gabriel Mendes dos Santos (1800–1873)	1 January 1850	30 April 1852	2 years, 120 days	Minas Gerais
29	José Ildefonso de Sousa Ramos, Viscount of Jaguari	José Ildefonso de Sousa Ramos, Viscount of Jaguari (1812–1883)	30 April 1852	20 May 1852	20 days	Rio de Janeiro
30	Antônio Peregrino Maciel Monteiro, 2nd Baron of Itamaracá	Antônio Peregrino Maciel Monteiro, 2nd Baron of Itamaracá (1804–1868)	20 May 1852	16 May 1854	1 year, 361 days	Pernambuco
31	Brás Carneiro Nogueira da Costa e Gama, Count of Baependi	Brás Carneiro Nogueira da Costa e Gama, Count of Baependi (1812–1887)	16 May 1854	15 May 1861	6 years, 364 days	Rio de Janeiro
32	Pedro Cavalcanti de Albuquerque, Viscount of Camaragibe	Pedro Cavalcanti de Albuquerque, Viscount of Camaragibe (1806–1875)	15 May 1861	1 January 1864	2 years, 231 days	Pernambuco
33	Zacarias de Góis e Vasconcelos	Zacarias de Góis e Vasconcelos (1815–1877)	1 January 1864	1 January 1865	31 days	Paraná
34	Francisco José Furtado	Francisco José Furtado (1818–1870)	1 February 1864	10 August 1864	191 days	Maranhão
35	Camilo Ferreira Armond, Count of Prados	Camilo Ferreira Armond, Count of Prados (1815–1882)	10 August 1864	31 August 1866	2 years, 21 days	Minas Gerais
36	Saldanha Marinho	Saldanha Marinho (1816–1895)	31 August 1866	15 May 1867	257 days	Rio de Janeiro
37	Francisco de Paula da Silveira Lobo	Francisco de Paula da Silveira Lobo (1826–1886)	15 May 1867	15 May 1869	2 years, 0 days	Minas Gerais
38	Pedro Cavalcanti de Albuquerque, Viscount of Camaragibe	Pedro Cavalcanti de Albuquerque, Viscount of Camaragibe (1806–1875)	15 May 1869	8 June 1869	24 days	Pernambuco
39	Joaquim Otávio Nébias	Joaquim Otávio Nébias (1811–1872)	8 June 1869	15 May 1870	341 days	São Paulo
40	Brás Carneiro Nogueira da Costa e Gama, Count of Baependi	Brás Carneiro Nogueira da Costa e Gama, Count of Baependi (1812–1887)	15 May 1870	14 August 1871	1 year, 91 days	Rio de Janeiro
41	Jerônimo José Teixeira Júnior, Viscount of Cruzeiro	Jerônimo José Teixeira Júnior, Viscount of Cruzeiro (1830–1892)	14 August 1871	30 March 1873	1 year, 228 days	Rio de Janeiro
42	Inocêncio de Araújo Góis, Baron of Araújo Góis	Inocêncio de Araújo Góis, Baron of Araújo Góis (1811–1897)	30 March 1873	17 June 1874	1 year, 79 days	Bahia
43	Manuel Francisco Correia	Manuel Francisco Correia (1831–1905)	17 June 1874	9 February 1877	2 years, 237 days	Paraná
44	Paulino de Sousa	Paulino de Sousa (1834–1901)	9 February 1877	22 December 1878	1 year, 316 days	Rio de Janeiro
45	Camilo Ferreira Armond, Count of Prados	Camilo Ferreira Armond, Count of Prados (1815–1882)	22 December 1878	1 January 1882	3 years, 10 days	Minas Gerais
46	Martinho Álvares da Silva Campos	Martinho Álvares da Silva Campos (1816–1887)	1 January 1882	15 February 1882	45 days	Minas Gerais
47	Martim Ribeiro de Andrada	Martim Ribeiro de Andrada (1825–1886)	15 February 1882	28 March 1882	41 days	São Paulo
48	João Ferreira Moura	João Ferreira Moura (1830–1912)	28 March 1882	11 July 1882	105 days	Bahia
49	José Lima Duarte, Viscount of Lima Duarte	José Lima Duarte, Viscount of Lima Duarte (1826–1896)	11 July 1882	18 June 1884	1 year, 343 days	Minas Gerais
50	Antônio Moreira de Barros	Antônio Moreira de Barros (1841–1896)	18 June 1884	31 August 1884	74 days	São Paulo
51	Manuel Alves de Araújo	Manuel Alves de Araújo (1832–1908)	31 August 1884	16 March 1885	197 days	Paraná
52	Antônio Moreira de Barros	Antônio Moreira de Barros (1841–1896)	15 March 1885	5 May 1885	51 days	São Paulo
53	Franklin Dória, Baron of Loreto	Franklin Dória, Baron of Loreto (1836–1906)	5 May 1885	7 August 1885	94 days	Piauí
54	André Augusto de Pádua Fleury	André Augusto de Pádua Fleury (1830–1895)	7 August 1885	19 May 1886	285 days	Goiás
55	Domingos de Andrade Figueira	Domingos de Andrade Figueira (1834–1910)	19 May 1886	14 May 1887	360 days	Rio de Janeiro
56	Augusto Gomes de Castro	Augusto Gomes de Castro (1836–1909)	14 May 1887	21 May 1888	1 year, 6 days	Maranhão
57	Henrique de Lucena, Baron of Lucena	Henrique de Lucena, Baron of Lucena (1835–1913)	21 May 1888	15 November 1889	1 year, 178 days	Pernambuco

=== Federative Republic of Brazil (1889–present) ===
No.	Portrait	President	Took office	Left office	Time in office	Party		State
1	João da Mata Machado	João da Mata Machado (1850–1901)	18 June 1891	31 October 1891	135 days		PRM	Minas Gerais
2	Bernardino José de Campos Júnior	Bernardino José de Campos Júnior (1841–1941)	31 October 1891	18 August 1892	292 days		PRP	São Paulo
3	João Lopes Ferreira Filho	João Lopes Ferreira Filho (1854–1928)	18 August 1892	17 May 1894	1 year, 272 days		Federalist	Ceará
4	Francisco de Assis Rosa e Silva	Francisco de Assis Rosa e Silva (1857–1929)	17 May 1894	19 May 1896	2 years, 2 days		PR Federal	Pernambuco
5	Artur César Rios	Artur César Rios (1846–1906)	19 May 1896	9 May 1899	2 years, 355 days		PRB	Bahia
6	Carlos Vaz de Melo	Carlos Vaz de Melo (1842–1904)	9 May 1899	6 May 1903	3 years, 362 days		PRM	Minas Gerais
7	Francisco de Paula Oliveira Guimarães	Francisco de Paula Oliveira Guimarães (1852–1909)	6 May 1903	9 May 1907	4 years, 3 days		PRB	Bahia
8	Carlos Peixoto	Carlos Peixoto (1871–1917)	9 May 1907	5 May 1909	1 year, 361 days		PRM	Minas Gerais
9	Sabino Barroso	Sabino Barroso (1859–1919)	5 May 1909	21 November 1914	5 years, 200 days		PRM	Minas Gerais
10	Astolfo Dutra Nicácio	Astolfo Dutra Nicácio (1864–1920)	21 November 1914	8 July 1917	2 years, 229 days		PRM	Minas Gerais
11	Sabino Barroso	Sabino Barroso (1859–1919)	8 July 1917	15 June 1919	1 year, 342 days		PRM	Minas Gerais
12	Astolfo Dutra Nicácio	Astolfo Dutra Nicácio (1864–1920)	15 June 1919	7 May 1920	0 days		PRM	Minas Gerais
13	Júlio Bueno Brandão	Júlio Bueno Brandão (1858–1931)	7 May 1920	16 May 1921	1 year, 9 days		PRM	Minas Gerais
14	Arnolfo Azevedo	Arnolfo Azevedo (1868–1942)	16 May 1921	1 January 1927	5 years, 230 days		PRP	São Paulo
15	Sebastião do Rego Barros	Sebastião do Rego Barros (1879–1946)	9 May 1927	11 November 1930	3 years, 186 days		PR Federal	Pernambuco
16	Antônio Ribeiro de Andrada IV	Antônio Ribeiro de Andrada IV (1870–1946)	15 November 1933	4 May 1937	3 years, 170 days	Minas Gerais		
17	Pedro Aleixo	Pedro Aleixo (1901–1975)	4 May 1937	10 November 1937	190 days	Minas Gerais		
18	Honório Fernandes Monteiro	Honório Fernandes Monteiro (1894–1968)	4 February 1946	18 March 1947	1 year, 42 days		PSD	São Paulo
19	Samuel Duarte	Samuel Duarte (1904–1979)	18 March 1947	12 March 1949	1 year, 359 days		PSD	Paraíba
20	Carlos Cyrillo Júnior	Carlos Cyrillo Júnior (1886–1965)	12 March 1949	12 March 1951	2 years, 0 days		PSD	São Paulo
21	Nereu Ramos	Nereu Ramos (1888–1958)	12 March 1951	3 February 1955	3 years, 328 days		PSD	Santa Catarina
22	Carlos Luz	Carlos Luz (1894–1961)	3 February 1955	15 November 1955	285 days		PSD	Rio de Janeiro
23	José Flores da Cunha	José Flores da Cunha (1880–1959)	15 November 1955	11 March 1956	117 days		UDN	Rio Grande do Sul
24	Ulysses Guimarães	Ulysses Guimarães (1916–1992)	11 March 1956	11 March 1958	2 years, 0 days		PSD	São Paulo
25	Ranieri Mazzilli	Ranieri Mazzilli (1910–1975)	11 March 1958	24 February 1965	6 years, 350 days		PSD	São Paulo
26	Olavo Bilac Pinto	Olavo Bilac Pinto (1908–1985)	24 February 1965	2 March 1966	1 year, 6 days		ARENA	Minas Gerais
27	Adauto Lúcio Cardoso	Adauto Lúcio Cardoso (1904–1974)	2 March 1966	3 February 1967	338 days		ARENA	Guanabara
28	João Batista Ramos	João Batista Ramos (1910–2002)	3 February 1967	23 February 1968	1 year, 20 days		ARENA	São Paulo
29	José Bonifácio Lafayette de Andrada	José Bonifácio Lafayette de Andrada (1904–1986)	23 February 1968	30 March 1970	2 years, 35 days		ARENA	Minas Gerais
30	Geraldo Freire	Geraldo Freire (1912–2002)	30 March 1970	3 February 1971	310 days		ARENA	Minas Gerais
31	Ernesto Pereira Lopes	Ernesto Pereira Lopes (1905–1993)	3 February 1971	28 February 1973	2 years, 25 days		ARENA	São Paulo
32	Flávio Marcílio	Flávio Marcílio (1917–1992)	28 February 1973	2 February 1975	1 year, 339 days		ARENA	Ceará
33	Célio Borja	Célio Borja (1928–2022)	2 February 1975	28 February 1977	2 years, 26 days		ARENA	Rio de Janeiro
34	Marco Maciel	Marco Maciel (1940–2021)	28 February 1977	2 February 1979	1 year, 339 days		ARENA	Pernambuco
35	Flávio Marcílio	Flávio Marcílio (1917–1992)	2 February 1979	26 February 1981	2 years, 24 days		ARENA	Ceará
36	Nelson Marchezan	Nelson Marchezan (1938–2002)	26 February 1981	2 February 1983	1 year, 341 days		PDS	Rio Grande do Sul
37	Flávio Marcílio	Flávio Marcílio (1917–1992)	2 February 1983	28 February 1985	2 years, 26 days		PDS	Ceará
38	Ulysses Guimarães	Ulysses Guimarães (1916–1992)	28 February 1985	15 February 1989	3 years, 353 days		MDB	São Paulo
39	Antonio Paes de Andrade	Antonio Paes de Andrade (1927–2015)	15 February 1989	2 February 1991	1 year, 352 days		MDB	Ceará
40	Ibsen Pinheiro	Ibsen Pinheiro (1935–2020)	2 February 1991	2 February 1993	2 years, 0 days		MDB	Rio Grande do Sul
41	Inocêncio de Oliveira	Inocêncio de Oliveira (born 1938)	2 February 1993	2 February 1995	2 years, 0 days		PFL	Pernambuco
42	Luís Eduardo Magalhães	Luís Eduardo Magalhães (1955–1998)	2 February 1995	5 February 1997	2 years, 3 days		PFL	Bahia
43	Michel Temer	Michel Temer (born 1940)	5 February 1997	14 February 2001	4 years, 9 days		MDB	São Paulo
44	Aécio Neves	Aécio Neves (born 1960)	14 February 2001	17 December 2002	1 year, 306 days		PSDB	Minas Gerais
45	Efraim Morais	Efraim Morais (born 1952)	17 December 2002	2 February 2003	47 days		PFL	Paraíba
46	João Paulo Cunha	João Paulo Cunha (born 1958)	2 February 2003	14 February 2005	2 years, 12 days		PT	São Paulo
47	Severino Cavalcanti	Severino Cavalcanti (1930–2020)	14 February 2005	21 September 2005	219 days		PP	Pernambuco
–	José Thomaz Nonô	José Thomaz Nonô (born 1947); Acting	21 September 2005	28 September 2005	7 days		PFL	Alagoas
48	Aldo Rebelo	Aldo Rebelo (born 1956)	28 September 2005	1 February 2007	1 year, 126 days		PCdoB	São Paulo
49	Arlindo Chinaglia	Arlindo Chinaglia (born 1949)	1 February 2007	2 February 2009	2 years, 1 day		PT	São Paulo
50	Michel Temer	Michel Temer (born 1940)	2 February 2009	17 December 2010	1 year, 318 days		MDB	São Paulo
51	Marco Maia	Marco Maia (born 1965)	17 December 2010	4 February 2013	2 years, 49 days		PT	Rio Grande do Sul
52	Henrique Eduardo Alves	Henrique Eduardo Alves (born 1948)	4 February 2013	1 February 2015	1 year, 362 days		MDB	Rio Grande do Norte
53	Eduardo Cunha	Eduardo Cunha (born 1958)	1 February 2015	5 May 2016	1 year, 94 days		MDB	Rio de Janeiro
–	Waldir Maranhão	Waldir Maranhão (born 1955); Acting	5 May 2016	14 July 2016	70 days		PP	Maranhão
54	Rodrigo Maia	Rodrigo Maia (born 1970)	14 July 2016	1 February 2021	4 years, 202 days		DEM	Rio de Janeiro
55	Arthur Lira	Arthur Lira (born 1969)	1 February 2021	1 February 2025	4 years, 0 days		PP	Alagoas
56	Hugo Motta	Hugo Motta (born 1989)	1 February 2025	Incumbent	1 year, 245 days		Republicanos	Paraíba

== See also ==
- President of the Federal Senate (Brazil)
- (in Portuguese) Lista de presidentes da Câmara dos Deputados do Brasil
