= Luís Eduardo Magalhães =

Luís Eduardo Magalhães may refer to:

- Luís Eduardo Magalhães (Brazilian politician) (1955–1998), speaker of the Chamber of Deputies of Brazil from 1995 to 1997.
- Luís Eduardo Magalhães, Bahia, a city in the Brazilian state of Bahia.
