= Provinces of Brazil =

Primary subdivisions of the Empire of Brazil (1822–1889)

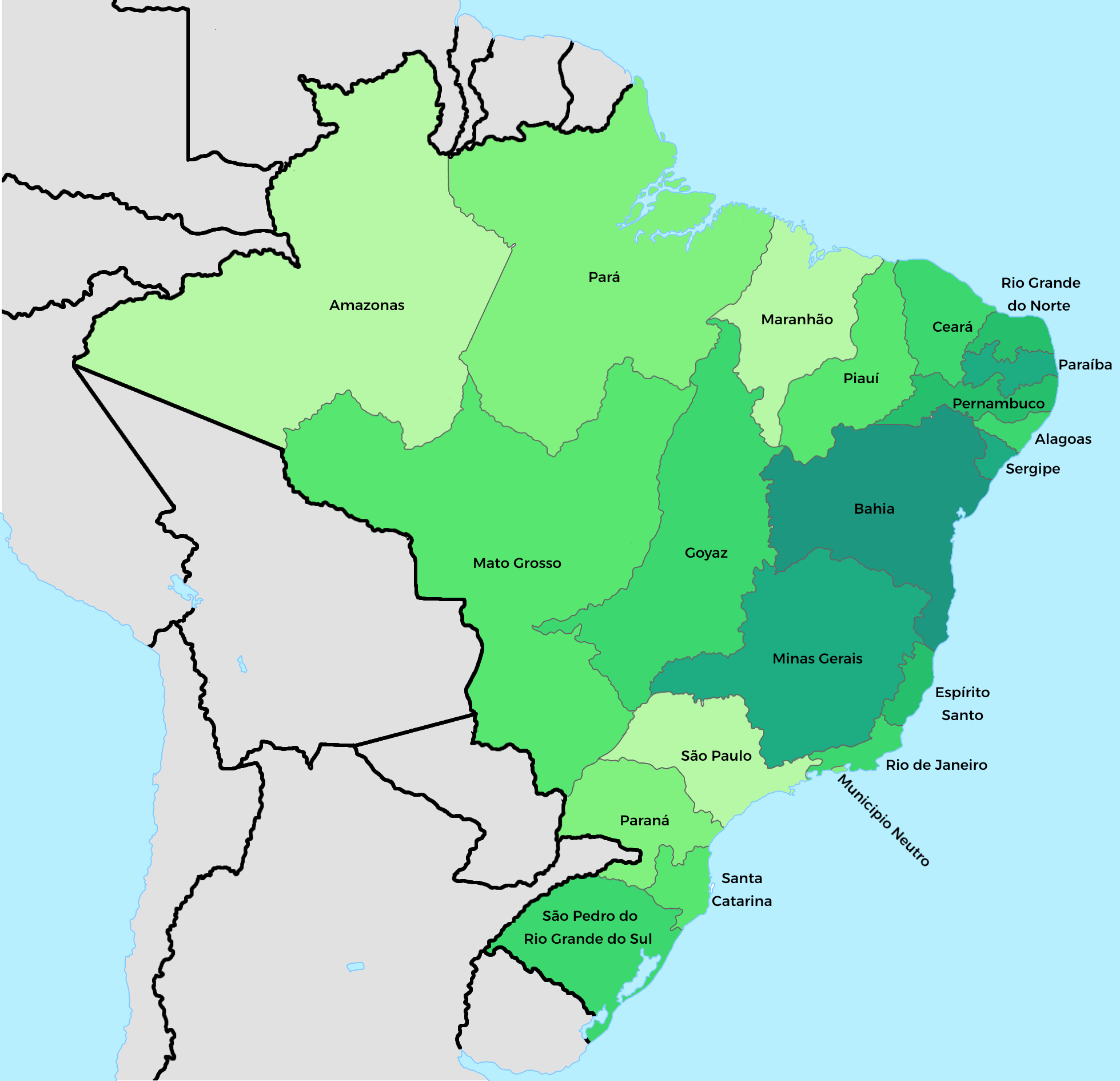
- The Empire of Brazil in 1889. Cisplatina had been lost since 1828 and two new provinces had been created since then (Amazonas and Paraná)
- Category: Province
- Location: Empire of Brazil
- Created: February 28, 1821
- Abolished: November 15, 1889
- Number: 20 provinces and 1 neutral municipality (as of 1889)
- Populations: 57,610 (Amazonas) – 2,039,735 (Minas Gerais) (as of 1872)
- Subdivisions: Municipality

The provinces of Brazil were the primary subdivisions of the country during the period of the Kingdom of Brazil (1821–1822) and then of the Empire of Brazil (1822–1889).

On February 28, 1821, the provinces were established in the Kingdom of Brazil (then part of the United Kingdom of Portugal, Brazil and the Algarves), superseding the captaincies that were in place at the time.

== Provinces of 1821 ==
Name	Entity since	Note
Alagoas	1817	Capitania de Alagoas split from the Capitania de Pernambuco
Bahia Province	1501	
Ceará Province	1822	
Cisplatina	1821	Banda Oriental (present-day Uruguay) annexed by the United Kingdom of Portugal, Brazil and the Algarves and incorporated into the Kingdom of Brazil under the name of Província Cisplatina.)
Espírito Santo Province	1534	
Goiás Province	1744	Capitania Geral de Goiás split from Capitania Geral de São Paulo; Archaic spelling: Goyaz
Grão-Pará Province	1775	
Maranhão Province	1535	
Mato Grosso Province	1748	Archaic spelling: Matto Grosso
Minas Gerais Province	1720	Archaic spelling: Minas Geraes
Paraíba Province	1574	Archaic spelling: Parahyba
Piauí Province	1718	Split from the Estado do Maranhão as the Capitania do Piauí; Archaic spelling: Piauhy
Pernambuco Province	1534	
Rio de Janeiro Province	1565	
Rio Grande do Norte Province	1530	created as the Capitania do Rio Grande
Santa Catarina Province	1738	Capitania de Santa Catarina split from the Capitania de São Paulo; Archaic spelling: Santa Catharina
São Paulo	1720	Capitania de São Paulo split from the Capitania de São Paulo e Minas de Ouro
São Pedro do Rio Grande do Sul Province	1760	
Sergipe Province	1590	

== Changes from 1821–1889 ==
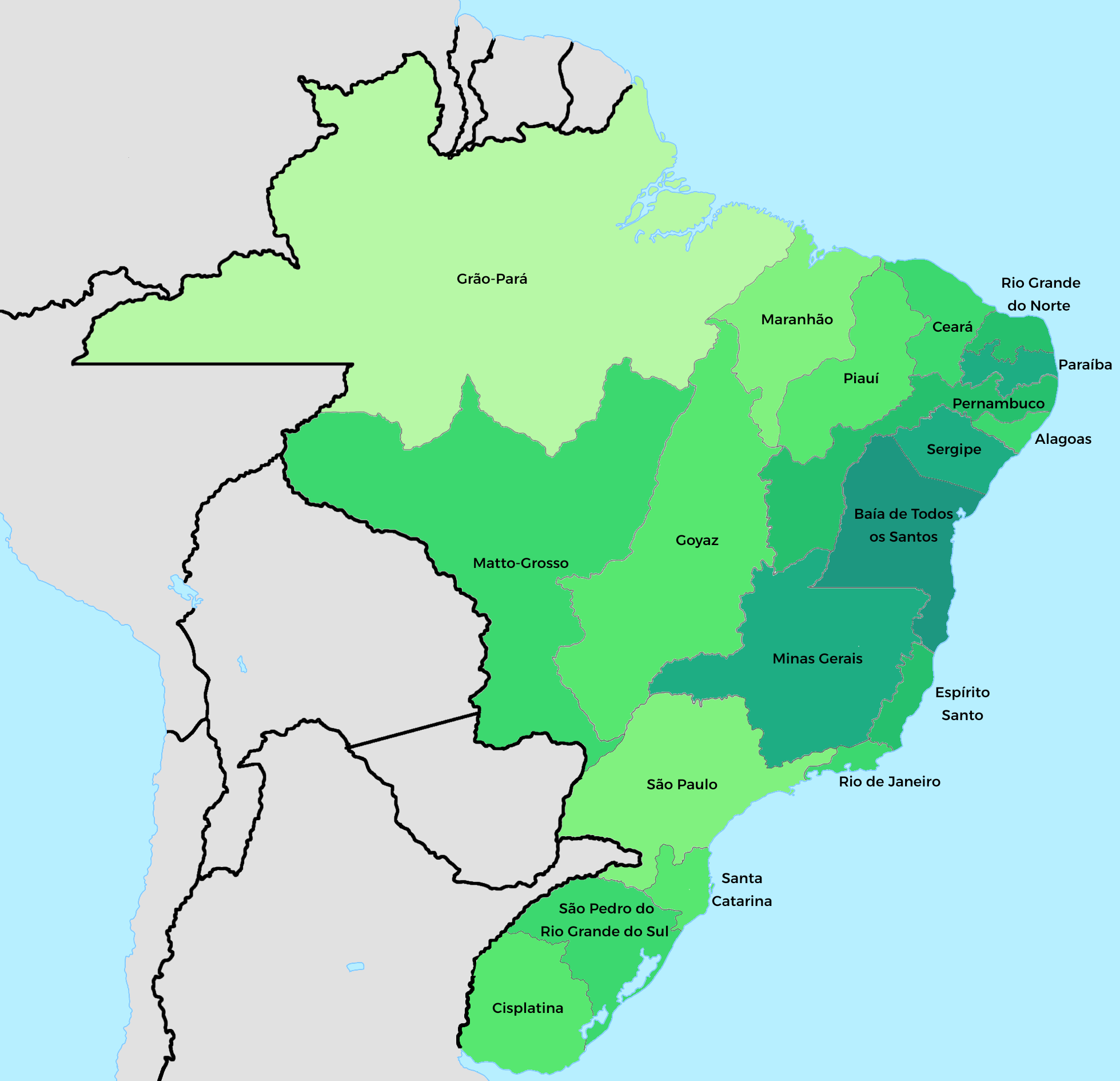
The provinces of the Empire of Brazil in 1822

=== 1821 ===
The captaincies of Brazil are renamed provinces.

The present-day Uruguay is occupied by the Portuguese Army and incorporated in Brazil as its Cisplatine Province.

=== 1822 ===
Independence of Brazil, with the provinces becoming provinces of the Empire of Brazil.

=== 1823 ===
The last Brazilian provinces that remained loyal to the Portuguese Government in Lisbon adhere to the Empire of Brazil.

=== 1828 ===
Cisplatina Province became the independent state of Uruguay.

=== 1834 ===
The city of Rio de Janeiro, the imperial capital, was removed from the province of Rio de Janeiro, and was included in the Neutral Municipality. At the same time, the capital of the province of Rio de Janeiro was transferred to Niterói.

=== 1850 ===
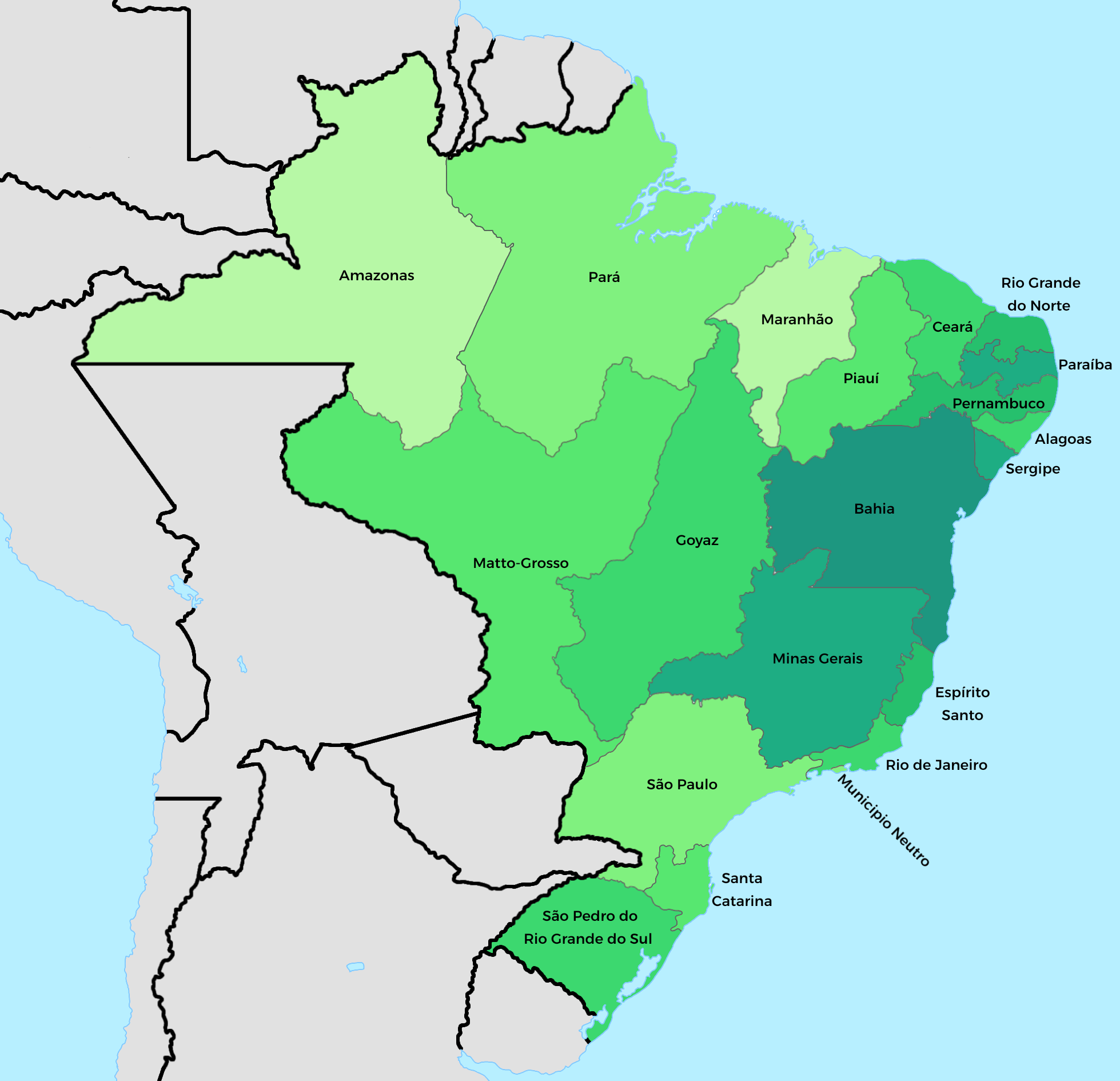
Brazil in 1851

Grão-Pará split into Amazonas and Pará.

=== 1889 ===
In 1889 the Empire of Brazil became the Republic of the United States of Brazil and the provinces became states. The Neutral Municipality that included the city of Rio de Janeiro became the Federal District.

== See also ==
- States of Brazil
- Captaincies of Brazil
