= Aldo Rebelo =

Brazilian politician (born 1956)

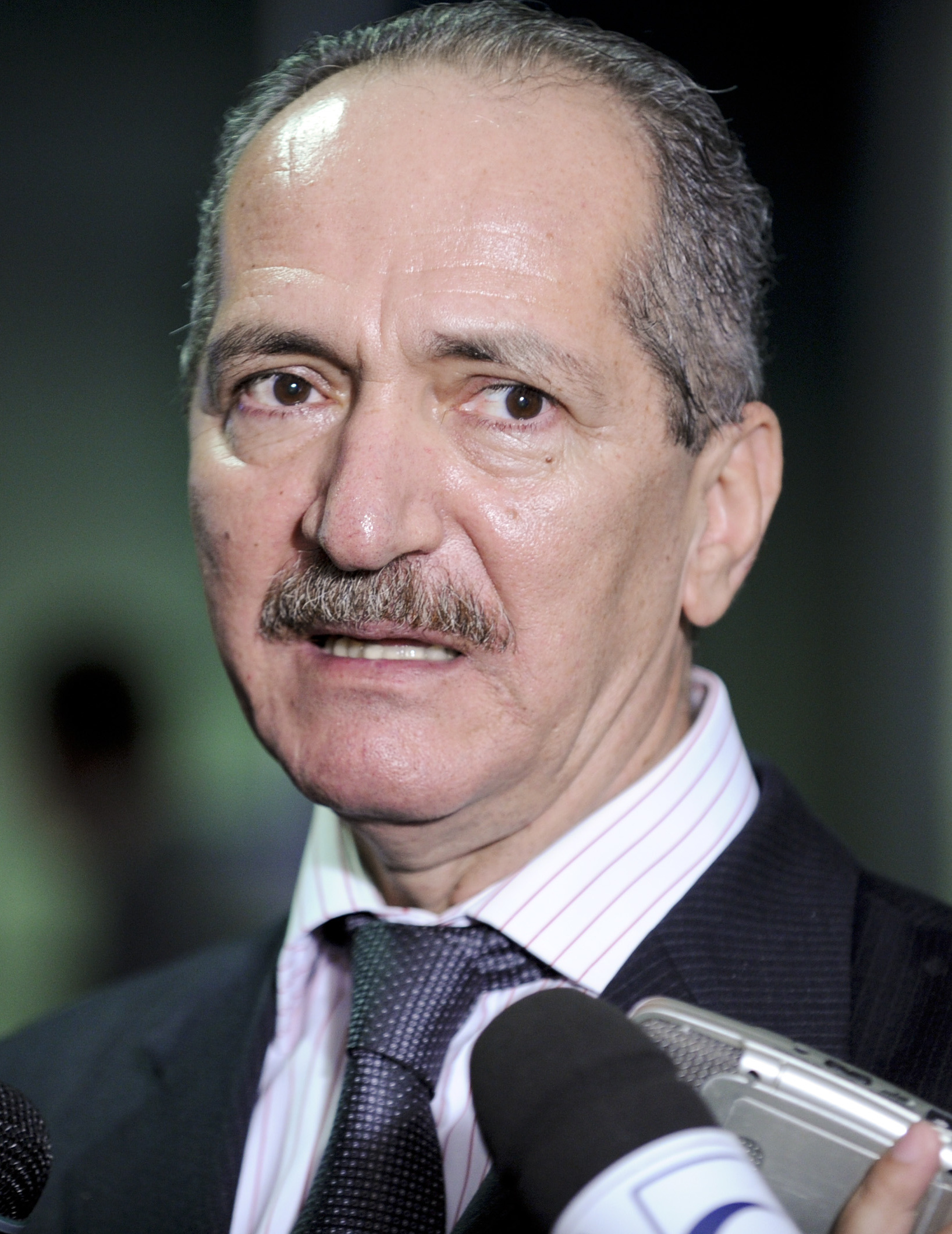
- Rebelo in 2015

Municipal Secretary of International Affairs of São Paulo
- In office 18 January 2024 – 17 July 2024
- Mayor: Ricardo Nunes
- Preceded by: Marta Suplicy
- Succeeded by: Ricardo Gomyde

Chief of Staff to the Governor of São Paulo
- In office 22 August 2018 – 31 December 2018
- Governor: Márcio França
- Preceded by: Samuel Moreira
- Succeeded by: Gilberto Kassab

Minister of Defence
- In office 2 October 2015 – 12 May 2016
- President: Dilma Rousseff
- Preceded by: Jaques Wagner
- Succeeded by: Raul Jungmann

Minister of Science, Technology and Innovations
- In office 1 January 2015 – 1 October 2015
- President: Dilma Rousseff
- Preceded by: Clelio Campolina Diniz
- Succeeded by: Celso Pansera

Minister of Sports
- In office 27 October 2011 – 31 December 2014
- President: Dilma Rousseff
- Preceded by: Orlando Silva
- Succeeded by: George Hilton

President of the Chamber of Deputies
- In office 28 September 2005 – 1 February 2007
- Preceded by: Severino Cavalcanti
- Succeeded by: Arlindo Chinaglia

Minister of Institutional Affairs
- In office 23 January 2004 – 20 July 2005
- President: Luiz Inácio Lula da Silva
- Preceded by: Office established
- Succeeded by: Jaques Wagner

Federal Deputy
- In office 1 February 1991 – 1 February 2015
- Constituency: São Paulo

Councillor of São Paulo
- In office 1 January 1989 – 1 February 1991
- Constituency: At-large

Personal details
- Born: 23 February 1956 (age 70) Viçosa, Alagoas, Brazil
- Party: DC (since 2025)
- Other political affiliations: MDB (1980–1985); PCdoB (1985–2017); PSB (2017–2018); Solidariedade (2018–2019); PDT (2022–2024); MDB (2024–2025)

José Aldo Rebelo Figueiredo (born 23 February 1956) is a Brazilian politician and a federal deputy elected by the state of São Paulo. He was President of the Chamber of Deputies of Brazil from 2005 to 2007.

With President Luiz Inácio Lula da Silva in Venezuela and Vice President José Alencar undergoing medical tests in the United States, Rebelo became the first communist to assume the duties of acting President of Brazil on 12 November 2006. His brief period in office lapsed the next day upon Lula's return.

He was the main author of a controversial project to change Brazil's Forest Code introduced in the 1960s. Those changes, lobbied by Brazilian farmers, aimed to extend the areas that can be legally deforested. Although President Rousseff vetoed some parts of the law drafted under Rebelo's leadership and finally passed in May 2012, critics such as the WWF saw the law as a catastrophe for the Amazon forest.

Rebelo was the Minister of Sports from 27 October 2011 until 31 December 2014. He was the Minister of Science, Technology and Innovation from 1 January 2015 to 1 October 2015. He was the Minister of Defense in the cabinet of President Dilma Rousseff from 1 October 2015 to 12 May 2016, when he was replaced by the acting president Michel Temer. He left the Communist Party in August, but then joined the Brazilian Socialist Party in September 2017. On 12 April 2018, he left the Brazilian Socialist Party (PSB) for being against a possible candidacy of the former minister of the Federal Supreme Court (STF) Joaquim Barbosa. Rebelo joined Solidariedade (SD) on the same day. On 26 July 2018, Rebelo officially withdrew his candidacy after the party announced support for Geraldo Alckmin along with other parties in the political center, and the name of Rebelo himself as a running mate of Alckmin was also discarded. On 18 August 2018, he took over as State Secretary of Chief of Staff on Márcio França's government (PSB), who became governor of São Paulo with Alckmin's resignation. In December 2019, he left Solidariedade. In August 2021, he launched himself as a presidential candidate again, besides not being affiliated with any party. In March 2022, Rebelo joined the Democratic Labour Party (PDT). In April 2024, he joined to MDB.

Football fan, is a declared fan of Palmeiras.

Political offices
| New office | Minister of Institutional Affairs; 2004–2005 | Succeeded by Jaques Wagner |
| Preceded by Severino Cavalcanti | President of the Chamber of Deputies; 2005–2007 | Succeeded by Arlindo Chinaglia |
| Preceded by Orlando Silva | Minister of Sports; 2011–2015 | Succeeded by George Hilton |
| Preceded by Clelio Campolina Diniz | Minister of Science, Technology and Innovations; 2015 | Succeeded by Celso Pansera |
| Preceded by Jaques Wagner | Minister of Defence; 2015–2016 | Succeeded by Raul Jungmann |
| Preceded by Samuel Moreira | Chief of Staff to the Governor of São Paulo; 2018 | Succeeded by Gilberto Kassab |
| Preceded by Marta Suplicy | Municipal Secretary of International Affairs of São Paulo; 2024 | Succeeded by Ricardo Gomyde |
