= Severino Cavalcanti =

Brazilian politician (1930–2020)

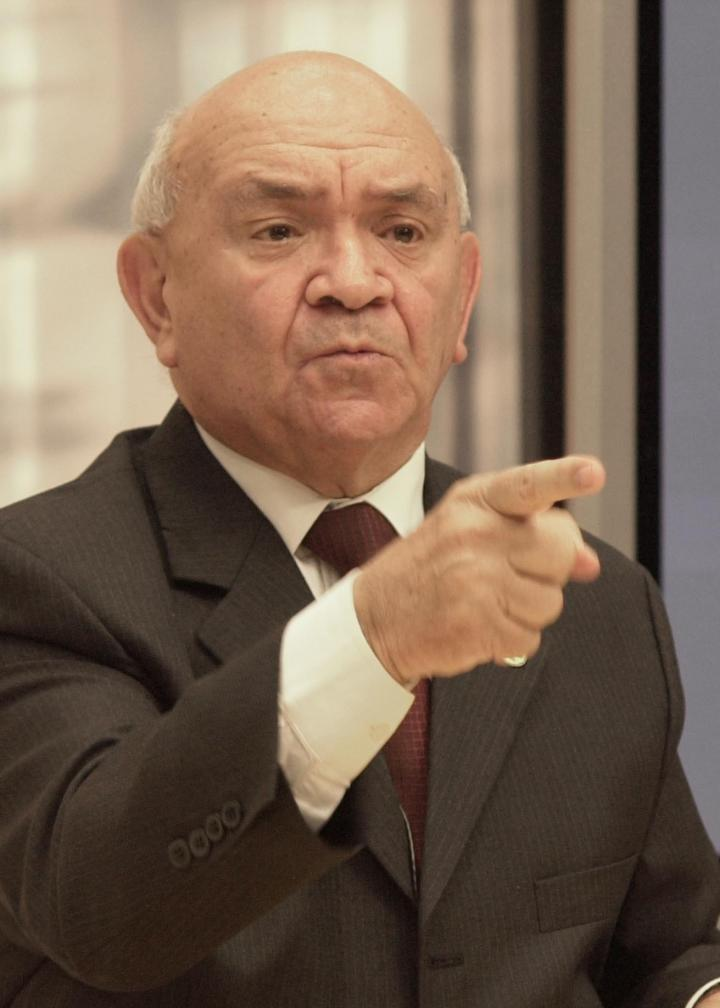
- Cavalcanti in 2005

Mayor of João Alfredo
- In office 1 January 2009 – 31 December 2012
- Vice Mayor: Dimas Neto
- Preceded by: Maria Sebastiana da Conceição
- Succeeded by: Maria Sebastiana da Conceição
- In office 3 July 1964 – 19 January 1966
- Preceded by: José Ferreira da Silva
- Succeeded by: João Francisco de Barros

President of the Chamber of Deputies
- In office 14 February 2005 – 21 September 2005
- Preceded by: João Paulo Cunha
- Succeeded by: Aldo Rebelo

Federal Deputy for Pernambuco
- In office 1 February 1995 – 21 September 2005
- Constituency: At-large

State Deputy of Pernambuco
- In office 1 February 1967 – 1 February 1995
- Constituency: At-large

Personal details
- Born: Severino José Cavalcanti Ferreira; 18 December 1930 João Alfredo, Pernambuco, Brazil
- Died: 15 July 2020 (aged 89) Recife, Pernambuco, Brazil
- Party: UDN (1962–66); ARENA (1966–79); PDS (1980–87); PDC (1987–90); PL (1990–92); PPR (1992–93); PFL (1994–95); PP (1995–2020)

Severino José Cavalcanti Ferreira (18 December 1930 – 15 July 2020) was a Brazilian politician, born in João Alfredo, Pernambuco. He was a member of the Progressive Party, despite having changed parties eight times in his career. He was the mayor of João Alfredo, a member of the Pernambuco State Assembly and a federal congressman.

In 2005, he ran for the presidency of Brazilian chamber of deputies, thinking that the official candidate of the Lula government, Luiz Eduardo Greenhalgh, would win. However, because of the internal crisis of the government at the time, Cavalcanti was able to take the post.

On 21 September 2005, he resigned from his position as federal deputy, and his position as President of the House was taken over provisionally by the Vice-President of the House José Thomaz Nonô.

In October 2008, Cavalcanti was elected as mayor of João Alfredo.

Political offices
Preceded by José Ferreira da Silva	Mayor of João Alfredo; 1964–1966; 2009–2013	Succeeded by João Francisco de Barros
Preceded by Maria Sebastiana da Conceição	Mayor of João Alfredo; 1964–1966; 2009–2013	Succeeded by Maria Sebastiana da Conceição
Preceded by João Paulo Cunha	President of the Chamber of Deputies; 2005	Succeeded by Aldo Rebelo
