= Ibsen Pinheiro =

Brazilian journalist (1935–2020)

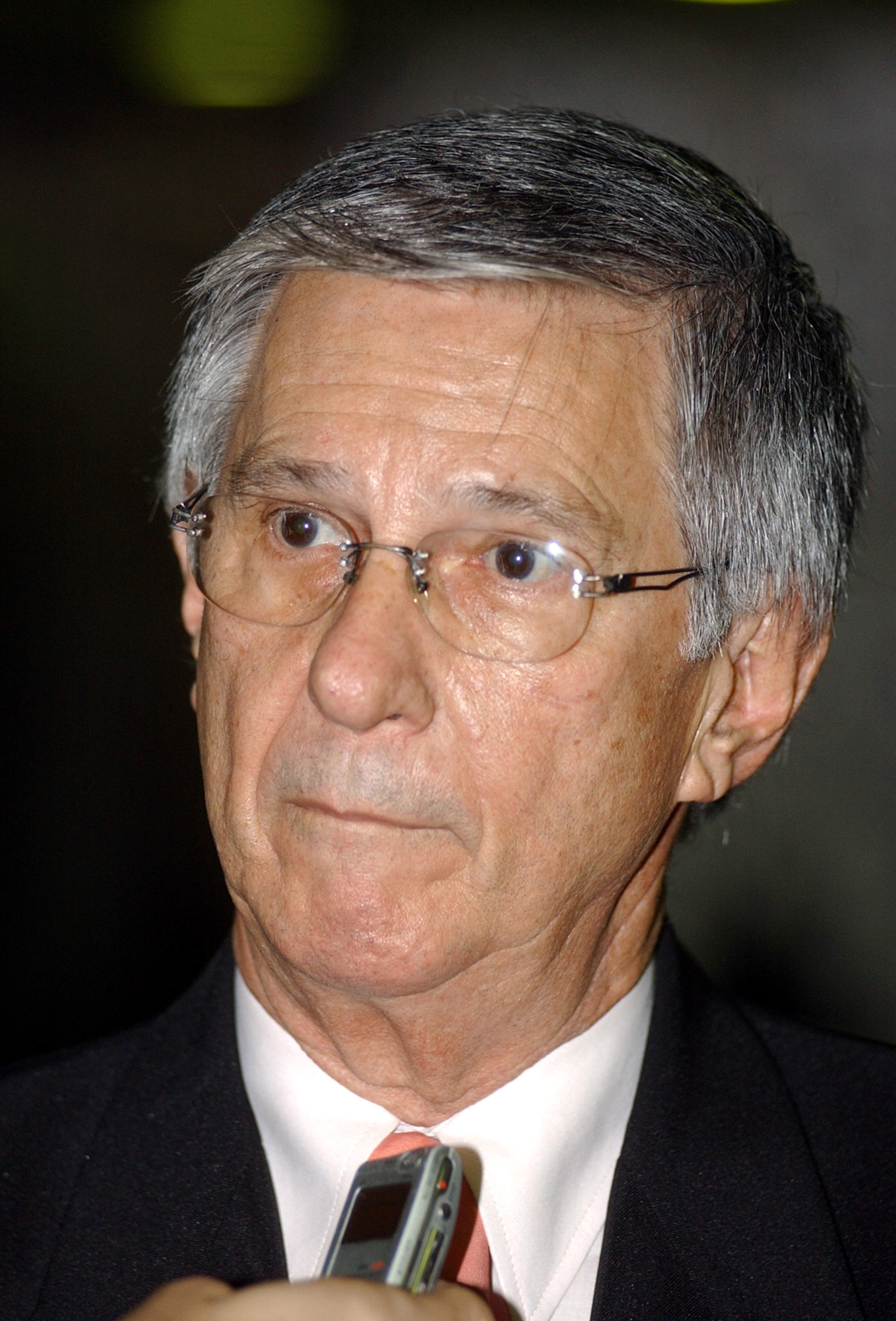
- Pinheiro in 2006

President of the Chamber of Deputies
- In office 2 February 1991 – 2 February 1993

Federal Deputy for the Federal District
- In office 1 February 2003 – 31 January 2011
- In office 1 February 1983 – 18 May 1994

State representative for Federal District
- In office 1 January 1979 – 1 January 1981

Personal details
- Born: 5 July 1935; São Borja, Rio Grande do Sul, Brazil
- Died: 25 January 2020 (aged 84); Porto Alegre, Rio Grande do Sul, Brazil
- Political party: MDB

Ibsen Pinheiro (5 July 1935 – 24 January 2020) was a Brazilian journalist politician who served as a Deputy and as President of the Chamber of Deputies. He was president of the chamber during the impeachment of Fernando Collor de Mello.

== Early life ==
Pinheiro was the son of Ricardo Pinheiro Bermudes and Lilia Valls Pinheiro. He graduated with a degree in law from the Pontifical Catholic University of Rio Grande do Sul in the 1960s.
