= Amazonas Province (Brazil) =

Province of the Empire of Brazil

Amazonas Province Provínicia do Amazonas
- 1850–1889
- Flag of Amazonas Coat of arms from Empire of Brazil

- Status: Province
- Capital: Manaus
- Common languages: Portuguese
- Religion: Roman Catholic
- Government: Constitutional monarchy
- Provincial President
  - 1852–1853: João Batista Figueiredo Tenreiro Aranha (office created)
  - 1889: Manuel Francisco Machado (last)
- History
  - Established: 1850
  - Disestablished: 1889
- Currency: Real
Preceded by	Succeeded by
Grão-Pará Province	Amazonas (Brazilian state)
- Today part of: Amazonas; Roraima

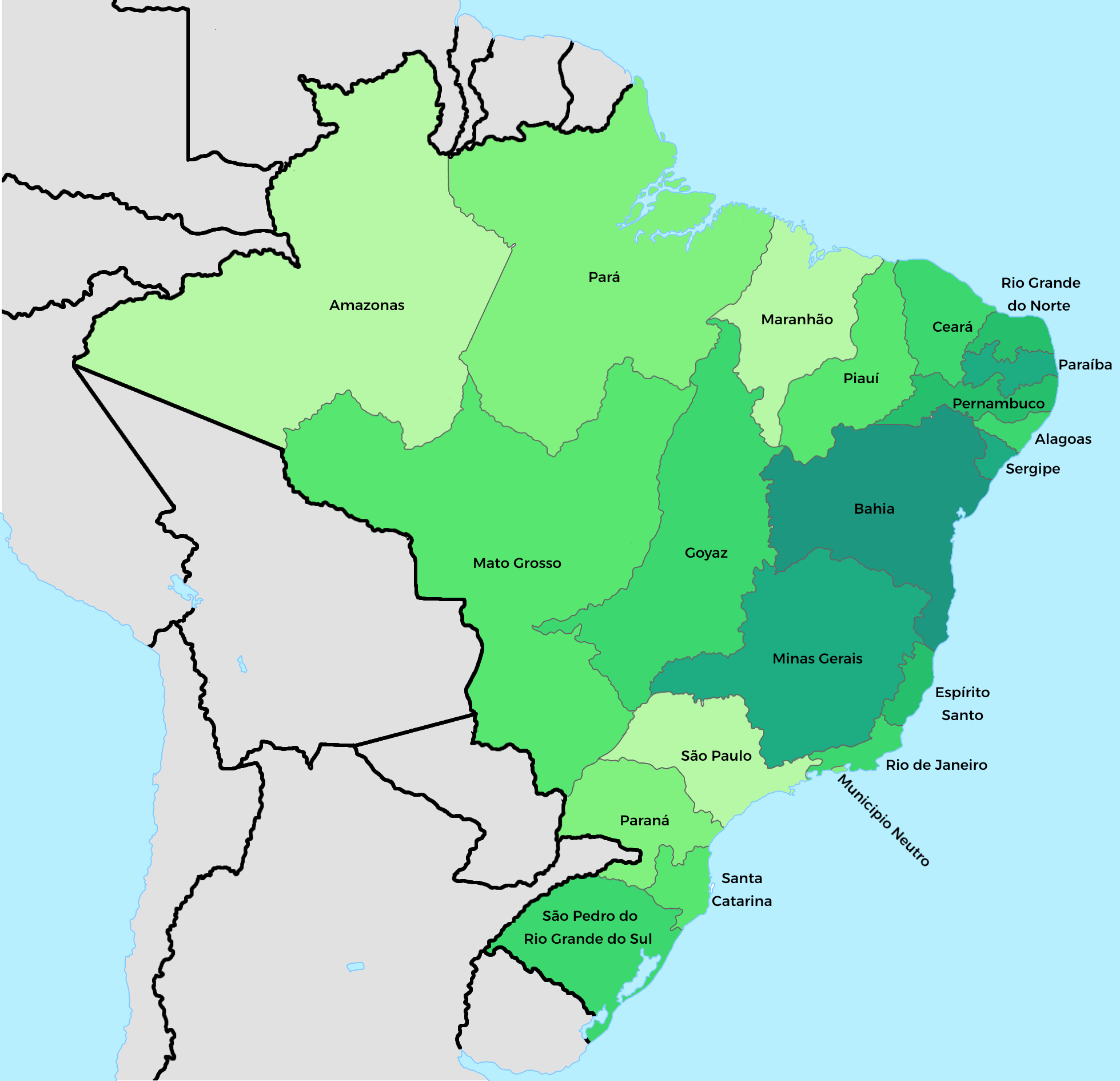
The Empire of Brazil, c. 1889.

Amazonas Province was one of the provinces of the Empire of Brazil. It was created in 1850 from territory of Grão-Pará Province.

In 1889 it became Amazonas (Brazilian state).
