= Saraiva Law =

Law in the Empire of Brazil

Chamber of Deputies
- Long title: Decree No. 3,029 of 9 January 1881
- Territorial extent: Empire of Brazil
- Passed by: Chamber of Deputies
- Passed: 25 June 1880
- Passed by: Senate
- Passed: 4 January 1881
- Signed by: Pedro II
- Commenced: 9 January 1881

First chamber: Chamber of Deputies
- Introduced by: José Antônio Saraiva

Summary
- Reforms electoral legislation

The so-called Saraiva Law (Portuguese: Lei Saraiva), officially Decree No. 3,029 of 9 January 1881, was the law that reformed the electoral system in the Empire of Brazil, instituting, for the first time, the elector registration in the country, and the direct elections for all elective positions: senators, deputies to the General Assembly, members of the Provincial Legislative Assemblies, municipal councilors and justices of the peace, but prohibited the illiterate to vote, which significantly reduced the number of people eligible to vote as most of the country's population was illiterate.

The law also established that immigrants, in particular merchants and small industrialists, as well as those who were not Catholics, the official religion of the Empire, could be elected, provided they had an annual income of no less than two hundred thousand réis.

The final drafter of the law was general deputy Ruy Barbosa. The law's name was a tribute to councilor José Antônio Saraiva, then President of the Council of Ministers (Prime Minister) of Brazil, who was responsible for the biggest electoral reform in the country until then (Saraiva Cabinet of 1880).

== Background ==
=== The electoral process in the Empire of Brazil ===
In the twenty years before the end of the 19th century, Brazil was characterized by being a predominantly agrarian, landowning and slave-holding country. To maintain the order of the monarchic regime, the Empire used a political system in which the two main parties were controlled by the government and the electoral process kept much of society marginalized. It was from the economic progress in the coffee cycle, mainly in the province of São Paulo, that urban groups began to demand greater political participation, the replacement of the indirect electoral system by the direct one and the end of the census vote.

According to the 1824 Constitution, issued by emperor Pedro I, Brazilian elections would be for the choice of representatives of the legislative and executive powers. To vote, the citizens had to be male (slaves and women excluded) and be at least 25 years old (this minimum age was not valid only in the case of married men, clergymen, military personnel and graduates, who could vote at 21). In addition to these sieves, the electoral system used census voting, where one would only be able to vote by proving a minimum annual income from employment, commerce, industry or land ownership. With slavery still legal, the census vote excluded more parts of the Brazilian population, transforming the vote into an instrument of political action for the elites of the time.

Even with all the requirements, the few people who could vote did not directly choose their representatives; this was because, in the electoral system of the Empire, voters were divided between "parish voters" and "provincial voters". Parish voters were those who proved a minimum annual income of 100 thousand réis to vote for provincial voters, who, in turn, proved a minimum annual income of 200 thousand réis and voted directly for deputies and senators.

At the time, deputies and senators had to prove a minimum income even higher than voters in order to be a candidate. Candidates for deputy should have a minimum income of 400 thousand réis per year, while candidates for the Senate had to earn 800 thousand réis. This requirement meant that, in the country's main legislative positions, there were no representatives of the majority of the Brazilian population, which were the less financially affluent layers of society.

== The law ==
=== The Sinimbu project ===
In January 1878, emperor Pedro II, pressured by society's demands for direct elections, summoned João Lins Vieira Cansanção de Sinimbu, the Viscount of Sinimbu, to preside over a liberal cabinet, with the task of carrying out electoral reform to introduce the direct vote in Brazil. The law project proposed doubling the minimum income for citizens to vote, from 200 to 400 thousand réis in addition to excluding the right to vote for all those who could not read and write - a condition that did not exist in the 1824 Constitution.

Before the project was presented in the Chamber of Deputies, some deputies already argued that giving the right to vote to those who could not read and write would undermine democracy. Other deputies, such as Sinimbu himself, then Prime Minister, argued that literacy would be the least one can demand as a sieve of a person's intellectual capacity when choosing their representatives. The bill was eventually passed in the Chamber on 9 June 1879 and sent to the Senate. There, analyzed by two commissions, the bill was rejected as unconstitutional on 12 November 1879.

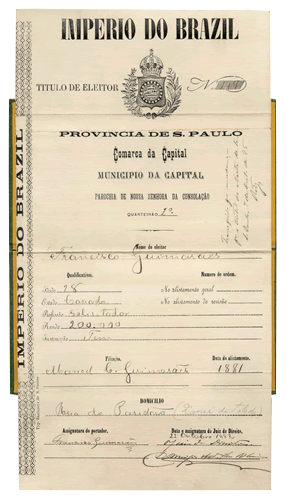
The elector registration license instituted by the Saraiva Law

This context was responsible for placing illiteracy as a central topic of discussion at the time, causing the definition of an illiterate person to be associated with a condition of ignorance, blindness, lack of intelligence and political incapacity.

=== The Saraiva project ===
Since the Senate had denied the electoral reform of Sinimbu by constitutional means, the Imperial government had the only way out to introduce the reform through an ordinary law to the new government. The emperor appointed José Antônio Saraiva to institute a new ministry that would have the task of carrying out an electoral reform in Brazil on 28 April 1880.

In an extraordinary session held on 29 April 1880, José Antônio Saraiva presented the electoral reform project prepared by his cabinet, where, according to the law, there would be no literacy requirement for voters to choose their representatives, only the basics would be required, such as a signature, to give regularity to the vote. A special commission took care of the proposal and, on May 25, offered a replacement project that had the support of Saraiva's cabinet. In this project, illiterates continued to be excluded from the electoral process, though indirectly, since, although literacy was no longer mandatory, at the time of voting the individual had to write the names of the candidates and sign the date of the election.

Even though the project was approved by the Chamber on 25 June 1880, Saraiva's project caused great discussions in the Senate. The senators who were against the project claimed that the illiterate would not be able to have the intellectual capacity to choose a candidate, since they did not know how to write their names with their own hands. The senators who were in favor argued that any Brazilian citizen, who acquired insignificant income or any education, should enter the electorate.

The replacement project of Saraiva's cabinet was approved in the Senate on 4 January 1881, becoming Decree No. 3,029 of 9 January 1881, which was commonly referred to as the Saraiva Law.

== Consequences ==
The Saraiva Law maintained the census voting system of the 1824 Constitution and added the exclusion of those considered illiterate from the electoral system. The very definition of what illiteracy was changed as the law projects on the participation of this layer of society in the electoral system were discussed on the Chamber of Deputies and the Senate, coming to mean not only the inability to read, write and perform simple mathematical calculations, but also, ignorance, moral and material blindness, dependence and, therefore, generating the inability to choose their representatives.

The majority of the Brazilian population was agrarian and in fact could not read or write. In 1872, the first Brazilian census showed that, for the population aged five years and over, the illiteracy rate marked 82.3% - it is estimated that, for individuals over 10 years old, the percentage was 78%. Thus, the literacy requirement to vote prevented the expansion of popular participation in the electoral process.

In 1872, Brazil had 1,089,659 parish voters, which represented about 10% of the country's population, and only 20,006 provincial voters, representing 0.2% of the Brazilian population. In the first election under Saraiva Law, on 31 October 1881, 96,411 voters turned out, out of an electorate of 145,296, less than 1.5% of the population and less than 1%, if the registered voters are considered.

More than a century later, prior to the 1988 Constitution, illiterates were granted the right to vote, with Constitutional Amendment No. 25 of 1985.
