= João Paulo Cunha =

Brazilian politician

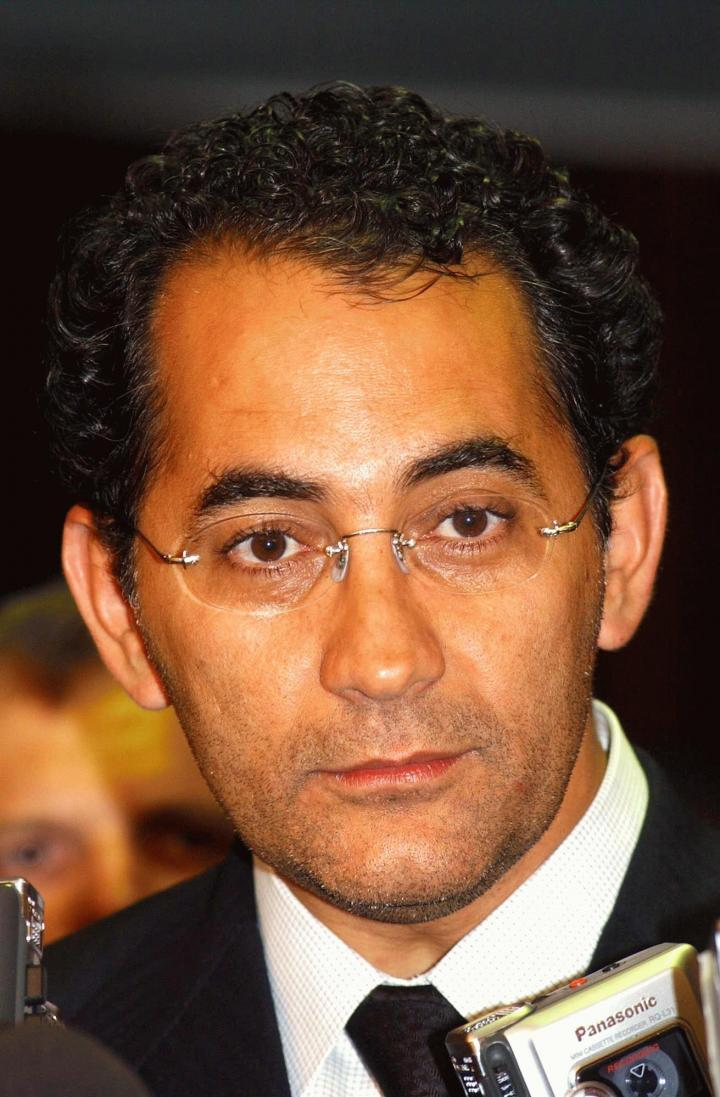

Member-elect of the Chamber of Deputies
- Assuming office 1 February 2027
- Constituency: São Paulo
- In office 1 February 1995 – 7 February 2014
- Constituency: São Paulo

President of the Chamber of Deputies
- In office 2 February 2003 – 14 February 2005
- Preceded by: Efraim Morais
- Succeeded by: Severino Cavalcanti

Member of the Legislative Assembly of São Paulo
- In office 15 March 1991 – 1 February 1995
- Constituency: At-large

Member of the Municipal Chamber of Osasco
- In office 1 January 1983 – 1 January 1988
- Constituency: At-large

Personal details
- Born: 6 June 1958 (age 68) Caraguatatuba, São Paulo, Brazil
- Party: PT (1981–present)
- Profession: Metalworker, lawyer

João Paulo Cunha (born 6 June 1958) is a deputy of the Workers' Party from São Paulo and was elected President of the Chamber of Deputies in 2003. He left this position in 2005.

In August 2012, whilst running the Brazilian municipal election in Osasco, Cunha was forced to pull out after he was convicted of corruption and money laundering. According to the accusation he received $24,000 (£15,000) from a businessman who was awarded a contract with Congress.

Political offices
Preceded by Efraim Morais	President of the Chamber of Deputies; 2003–2005	Succeeded by Severino Cavalcanti
