= George Hilton (politician) =

Brazilian politician (born 1971)

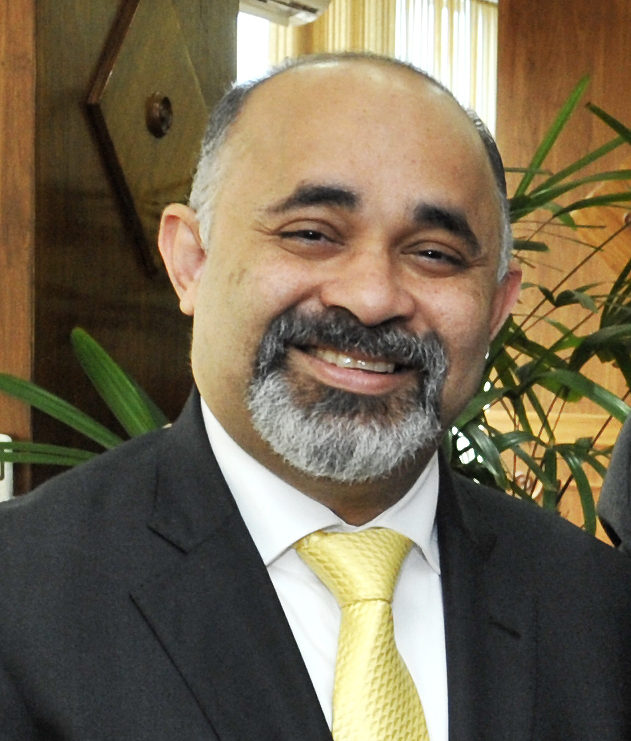
- Hilton in 2015

Minister of Sports
- In office 1 January 2015 – 23 March 2016
- President: Dilma Rousseff
- Preceded by: Aldo Rebelo
- Succeeded by: Ricardo Leyser

Federal Deputy
- In office 1 February 2007 – 1 February 2019
- Constituency: Minas Gerais

State Deputy of Minas Gerais
- In office 1 February 1999 – 31 January 2007
- Constituency: At-large

Personal details
- Born: 11 June 1971 (age 55) Alagoinhas, Bahia, Brazil
- Party: PT (since 2020)
- Other political affiliations: PSL (1999–2003); PL (2003–2007); PP (2007–2009); PRB (2009–2016); PROS (2016–2017); PSB (2017–2019); PSC (2019–2020)
- Profession: Radio host

George Hilton dos Santos Cecílio (born 11 June 1971) more commonly known as George Hilton is a Brazilian politician and radio personality. Although born in Bahia, he has spent his political career representing Minas Gerais, having served as state representative from 2007 to 2019.

== Personal life ==
Before becoming a politician Hilton worked as a radio personality. He is also an ordained pastor with the Universal Church of the Kingdom of God, although he says that his religion does not influence his political decisions.

== Political career ==
Hilton served two consecutive terms in the Legislative Assembly of Minas Gerais, between 1999 and 2007, for the PSL and PL parties. In 2006, he was elected federal deputy for Minas Gerais, being re-elected successively in 2010 and 2014. During the period he was a member of the Progressive Party, and from 2009 until 2016, he was affiliated to the Brazilian Republican Party.

On 23 December 2014, it was officially announced that Hilton was appointed as the future Brazilian Minister of Sportfor during the second term of the Dilma Rousseff's cabinet.

After being appointed to be minister of sports, the Brazilian Republican party announced that they would be expelling Hilton as the party was in opposition to the government of Dilma Rousseff, with Hilton joining the Republican Party of the Social Order. On 23 March 2016, he left the ministry of sport, with Ricardo Leyser being appointed his successor.

On April 17, 2016, George Hilton voted against opening the impeachment process of then president Dilma Rousseff. Subsequently, he voted against the PEC on the Ceiling of Public Spending. In January 2017, he joined the Brazilian Socialist Party. In August of the same year, he voted in favor of the process calling for the opening of a corruption investigation into then president Michel Temer.

Political offices
Preceded by Aldo Rebelo	Minister of Sports; 2015–2016	Succeeded by Ricardo Leyser
