= Luís Eduardo Magalhães, Bahia =

Municipality of Bahia, Brazil

Coordinates: 12.0919°S 45.805°W

City of Luís Eduardo Magalhães
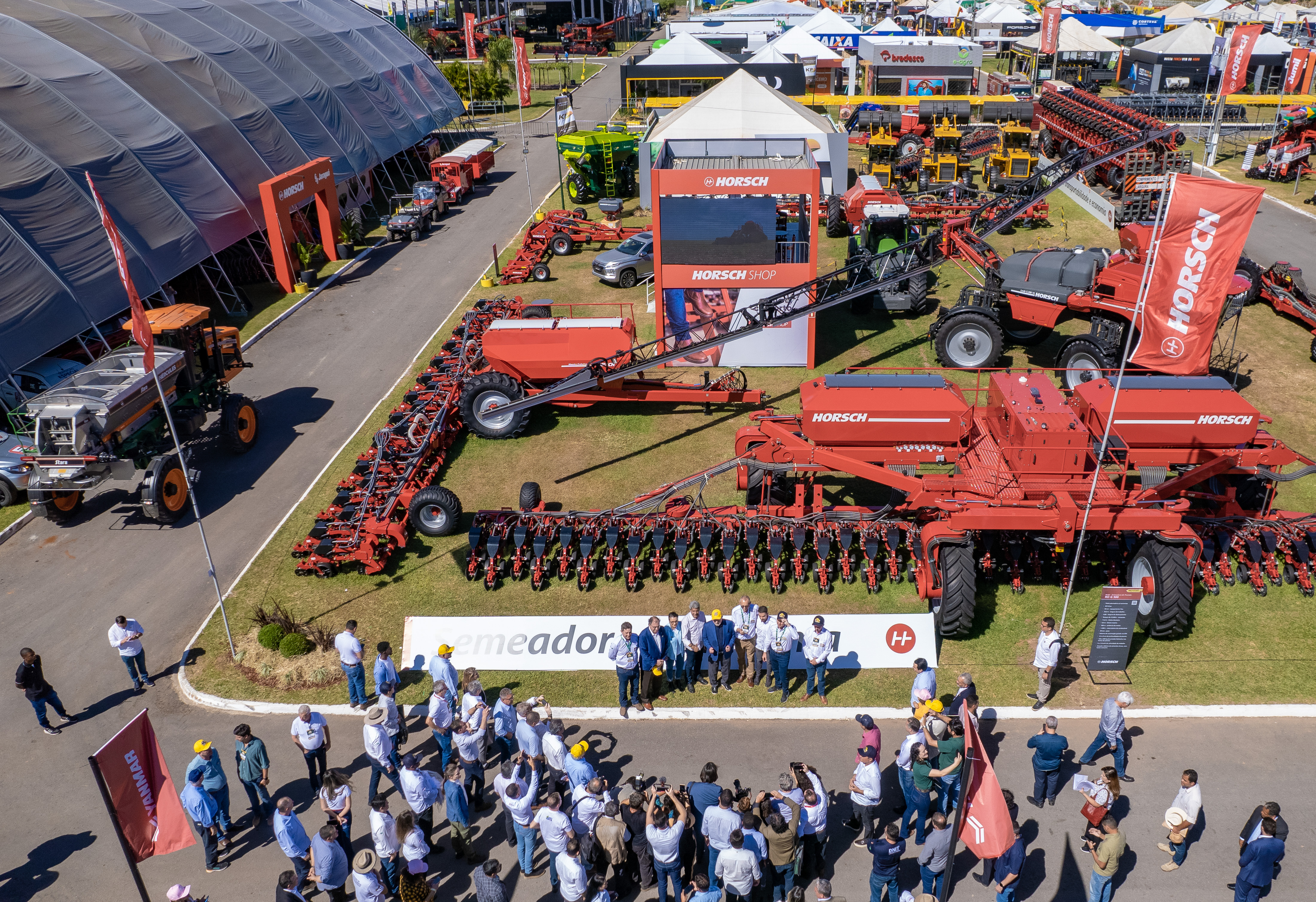
- Bahia Farm Show event in Luiz Eduardo Magalhães

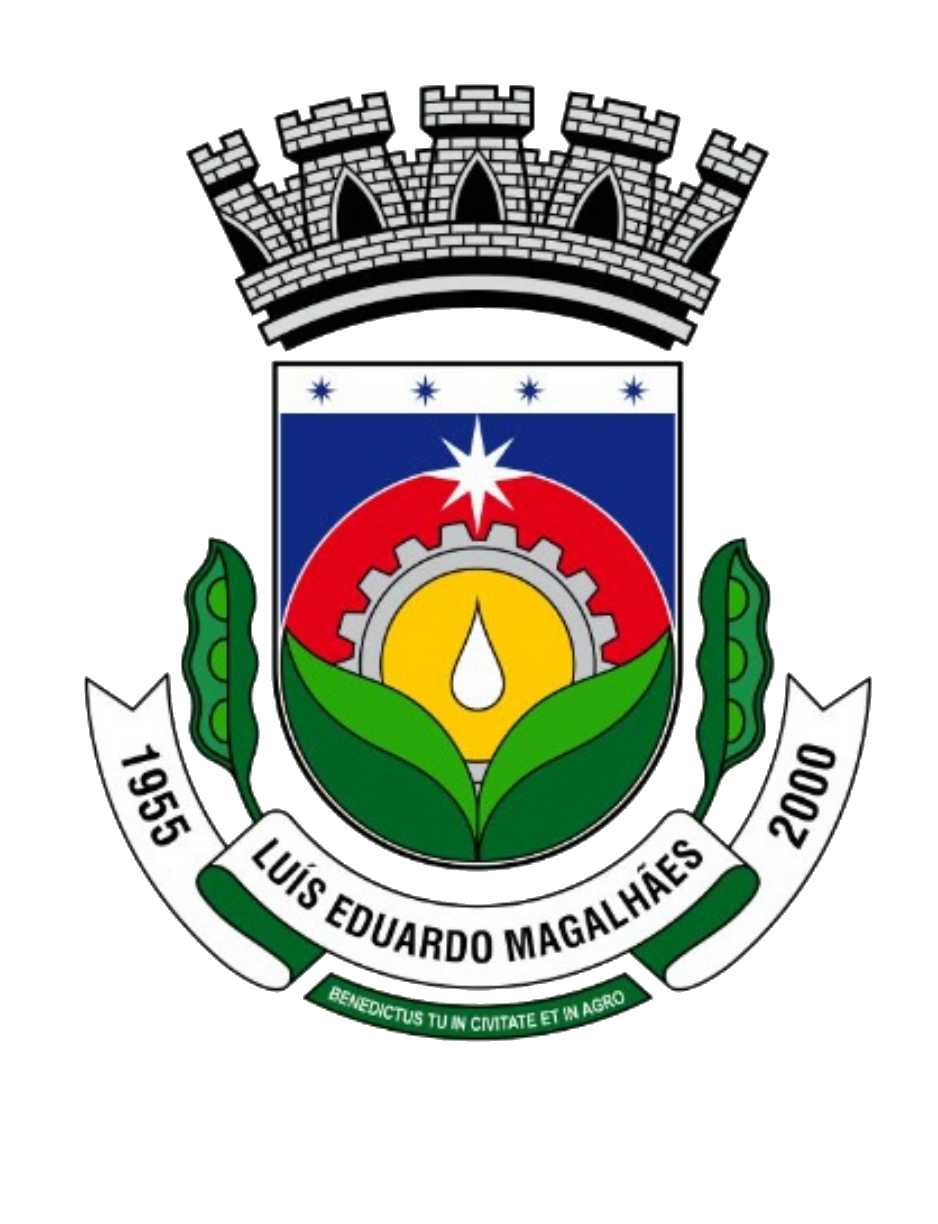
- Flag Coat of arms
- Nickname: The Capital of Agribusiness
- Motto: Citizen Development
- Location of Luís Eduardo Magalhães
- Country: Brazil
- Region: Northeast
- State: Bahia
- Founded: March 30, 2000

Government
  - Mayor: Junior Marabá (DEM)

Area
  - Total: 4,018 km^{2} (1,551 sq mi)
- Elevation: 720 m (2,360 ft)

Population (2022 Census)
  - Total: 107,909
  - Estimate (2025): 118,382
  - Density: 15.3/km^{2} (40/sq mi)
- Time zone: UTC−3 (BRT)
- CEP postal code: 47850-000
- Website: luiseduardomagalhaes.ba.gov.br

Luís Eduardo Magalhães is a municipality in western Bahia, Brazil. The town's main business is agriculture, and it is known as the capital of agribusiness. The city is located in the heart of a rapidly growing agribusiness region and as a result it is the fastest growing city in Brazil. As recently as the 1990s the community was little more than a gas station. It is currently home to Brazil's largest soy processing plant and a big John Deere dealership.

Because commercial hauling of all commodities to and from the region is done by diesel trucking, there exists high demand for diesel fuel. In 2004, the population of Luís Eduardo Magalhães was 21,454. In 2022 Census, the population was 107,909. The strong population growth was caused by the agribusiness.

The city received many farmers from Southern and Southeastern Brazil, contributing to the economic and cultural development of the city. Luís Eduardo Magalhães has been home to a significant community of young international farmers. The city is also one of the wealthiest agricultural cities in Brazil. Most of its development was made via channeling resources from other areas of the region. The creation of this municipality was ruled unconstitutional by Brazil's Supreme Court. It is named after a deceased member of a powerful oligarchic family, and the city was created solely as a display of power and disdain for the law. The Supreme Court was unable to undo its creation, and simply restated that creating new municipalities in the same fashion is deemed unconstitutional.

The city was named after former speaker of the Chamber of Deputies of Brazil Luís Eduardo Magalhães.

== Geography ==
=== Climate ===
The climate is Highland Tropical. The rainfall pattern is the same as that of the tropical climate. The summer rains are more intense due to the action of the Atlantic tropical mass.

Average temp: 22 °C (71.6 °F).

Rainfall: 700 to 2.000 mm (27.55 to 78,74 in).

Rainy Season: October – April.

Air Humidity: Annual: 70%. December: 80%. August: 50%.

== Economy ==
The economy of Luís Eduardo Magalhães is focused on agribusiness. The region is a major producer of cereals (soybeans and corn), coffee, cotton, as well as cattle raising. Irrigation, the level terrain, and the dry climate with well-defined dry and rainy seasons have made Luis Eduardo Magalhaes a leader in agriculture. Farmers and large agricultural companies from all over the world are purchasing large tracts of the region's fertile flat land. Individuals and companies from the United States, Canada, China, Argentina, India, United Kingdom, New Zealand, Netherlands, Germany and Ireland are making substantial investments in the region.

The GDP for the city was R$1,003,460,120 (2005).

The per capita income for the city was R$22,669 (2005).

== Education ==
The Portuguese language is the official national language, and thus the primary language taught in schools, but English and Spanish are part of the official high school curriculum.

=== Educational institutions ===
- Faculdade Arnaldo Horácio Ferreira (FAAHF);
- Faculdade Luiz Eduardo Magalhães (FILEM);
- Instituto de Educação Superior Unyahna Luis Eduardo Magalhães (IESULEM).
- Universidade Federal do Oeste da Bahia (UFOB)

== International Farmers in L.E.M. ==
In few years, the region of Luís Eduardo Magalhães has become home to a new community of International farmers. Though some locals have complained about foreigners bidding up land prices, the overseas investors seem to be very welcome. "Absolutely" is how LEM's former mayor, Oziel Oliveira, responded to the question. "They're turning into Brazilians."

== Distances ==
- 100 km (62 mi) from Barreiras;
- 947 km (588 mi) from Salvador;
- 540 km (340 mi) from Brasília;
- 1,282 km (797 mi) from São Paulo.

== See also ==
- List of municipalities in Bahia
