= Luís Eduardo Magalhães (Brazilian politician) =

Brazilian politician (1955-1998)

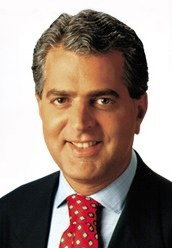

President of the Chamber of Deputies
- In office 2 February 1995 – 2 February 1997

Federal Deputy from Bahia
- In office 1 February 1987 – 21 April 1998

President of the Legislative Assembly of Bahia
- In office 1 February 1983 – 1 February 1985

State Deputy of Bahia
- In office 1 February 1979 – 1 February 1987

Personal details
- Born: Luís Eduardo Maron Magalhães; 16 March 1955 Salvador, Bahia, Brazil
- Died: 21 April 1998 (aged 43) Brasília, Federal District, Brazil
- Spouse: Michelle Marie Magalhães (m. 1976)
- Children: 3
- Parents: Antônio Carlos Magalhães (father); Arlette Magalhães (mother)
- Education: Federal University of Bahia

Luís Eduardo Maron Magalhães (Salvador, 16 March 1955 - Brasília, 21 April 1998) was a Brazilian politician. He was the speaker of the Chamber of Deputies of Brazil from 1995 to 1997, and a member of the Chamber of Deputies from 1987 until his death. He was also a member of the Legislative Assembly of Bahia from 1979 until 1987, where he also held the office of speaker from 1983 until 1985. He was a member of the Liberal Front Party (PFL).

== Biography ==
Luís Eduardo Maron Magalhães was born in Salvador, the capital of the state of Bahia, in northeastern Brazil, on 16 March 1955. He was the son of former governor of Bahia, senator, and minister of communications Antônio Carlos Magalhães with his wife Arlette Maron de Magalhães. He was also the grandson of politician Francisco Peixoto de Magalhães Neto, brother of ACM Júnior and the uncle of ACM Neto. He was a law graduate from the Federal University of Bahia, although he never practiced law.

He had a taste for music and literature and was considered a cinephile, spending entire Sundays watching "stacks" of films at his home in Brasília. In music, he considered Tom Jobim "the greatest", but without neglecting singers like Tony Bennett and Frank Sinatra. In literature, the writer Jorge Amado was, in his words, "the unbeatable ambassador of Bahia", followed by João Ubaldo Ribeiro, described as "simply brilliant".

== Political career ==
=== Early political career ===
At the age of 18, he began his public life as an officer in the Governor's Office of the State of Bahia in 1973, when his father was governor for the first time. Two years later he became Chief of Staff to the First Secretary of the Legislative Assembly of Bahia, remaining there until he ran for state representative at only 23 years old and subsequently won a seat in the Legislative Assembly of Bahia in 1978.

He served as a state representative for two consecutive terms, from 1979 until 1987, and he also served as the speaker of the Legislative Assembly of Bahia from 1983 to 1985. In 1984, when he learned that militants from the Bahia wing of the PCdoB had been arrested, he went to the police station to protest the arbitrary action.

=== Federal deputy ===
He was elected to the Chamber of Deputies of Brazil in the 1986 Brazilian general election, taking office in 1987. He was therefore a member of the National Constituent Assembly which drafted and wrote the constitution of Brazil, ratified in 1988. He fiercely criticized the final text of the 1988 Brazilian constitution, which he called unstructured, demagogic, and extravagant.

Over time, he became a great political articulator and strategist, although he opposed Fernando Collor's impeachment in 1992, as he thought Collor "deserved the necessary time for "complete clarification of the truth", as he understood that the president was a victim not only of his mistakes but also of his successes, among which he cited the policy of modernizing the economy and reducing import tariffs.

In 1993, he was admitted by President Itamar Franco to the Order of Military Merit in the degree of Special Commander. Magalhães was also admitted to the Order of Prince Henry the Navigator in 1997 in the degree of Grand Officer by Portuguese President Jorge Sampaio. He was posthumously promoted to the highest degree, the Grand Cross, in 2000.

In the 1994 Brazilian general election, his last one, he was the most voted federal deputy in Bahia, being re-elected with more than 138,000 votes.

He was an important link in bringing Antônio Carlos Magalhães closer to Fernando Henrique Cardoso, with his father exerting a strong influence to guarantee his candidacy for vice-president (Cardoso ultimately chose Marco Maciel as his running mate), although he preferred to remain a congressman and later was elected the speaker of the Chamber of Deputies.

=== Speaker of the Chamber of Deputies ===
He was elected the speaker of the chamber in 1995. As the speaker of the Chamber of Deputies, he oversaw the approval of more than fifty laws and fourteen constitutional amendments proposed by the government. He spearheaded the breaking of the oil monopoly, approved the new concept of national companies, ended restrictions on foreign capital, and was instrumental in the approval of the reelection amendment, his last act as the speaker of the Chamber. He was even described by his more malicious political adversaries as the most subservient speaker of the Chamber to the Planalto Palace since the military dictatorship.

He decided to break with the practice of convening the so-called "college of leaders", in which decisions were made by a top-down consensus that brought together the government and the opposition. Seeking to expedite voting and knowing that the majority of deputies favored the reforms, he began to put the bills and amendments directly to the floor. He served as acting president of the republic on 17 October 1995, and from 5 November 1995 to 8 November 1995.

After private conversations with Fernando Henrique Cardoso, Luís Eduardo yielded to pressure from his father, who feared leaving the state government without a Magalhães for too long, in order to run for governor, even though he clearly preferred the Senate. Antônio Carlos awaited his son's answer at a lunch in Brasília, where they always followed the same routine when they were close. Luís Eduardo uttered the password: "Bahia". It was all his father wanted to hear. His candidacy for Governor of Bahia was already taking off. His father and also his party dreamed of having a presidential candidate in the future, and they thought Luís Eduardo Magalhães seemed to be the best option until then.

A defender of free enterprise and the opening of the economy to foreign capital, a disciple and admirer of former minister Roberto Campos, Luís Eduardo had no difficulty navigating the left wing of Congress, despite his firm stance in Congress, as in the case of the expulsion of Sérgio Naya, the deputy who built the faulty Palace II building in Rio de Janeiro (which was built with faulty materials and partly collapsed in 1998, after which the rest of the building was imploded).

Luís Eduardo was considered an efficient negotiator due to his aptitude, eloquence, and skill. He had the patience to negotiate, knew each deputy by name, and had no reservations about receiving the so-called lower clergy in his office.

== Death and legacy ==
On 21 April 1998, he suffered an acute myocardial infarction, identified after feeling unwell upon returning from one of his usual walks in Brasília, around 11:30.

According to his father, then senator Antônio Carlos Magalhães, he noticed in a phone call with his son that the congressman's voice was different from usual and advised him, instead of going to Congress, to go to the Santa Lúcia hospital. He also reported that Luís Eduardo was overly emotional about the death of the then minister of Communications, Sérgio Motta, who had died on 19 April, two days earlier.

Luís Eduardo's death was confirmed by doctors later that day at 20:00, and his funeral was held that same evening at the National Congress. His burial took place on the next day, in Salvador. He was 43 years old.

After his death and the consequent political vacuum left behind, Jorge Bornhausen, then president of the PFL, worked intensely to give prominence to his Santa Catarina party members in the face of the weakening of the Bahia wing of the party. Also after his death, the then-district of Mimoso do Oeste (in Western Bahia) was renamed after him and became a municipality with his name.
