= Federal District of Brazil (1891–1960) =

Federal district that existed in Brazil from 1891 to 1960

Federal District of Brazil Distrito Federal do Brasil
- Federation unit of Brazil
- 1891–1960
- Flag

- Location of the state of Rio de Janeiro (light yellow) and the now-defunct Federal District (red) in Brazil.
- Capital: Rio de Janeiro
- Area
  - Coordinates: 22°55′S 43°28′W
  - Type: Presidential republic
- History
  - Constitution of 1891: 24 February 1891
  - Revolution of 1930: 3 October 1930
  - Fourth Republic: 18 September 1946
  - Creation of Brasília: 21 April 1960
Preceded by	Succeeded by
Neutral Municipality	Guanabara (state)

The Federal District (Portuguese: Distrito Federal) was an administrative division of Brazil created by the Brazilian Constitution of 1891. During the Empire of Brazil, the administrative unit that corresponded to this territory was designated the Neutral Municipality (Município Neutro). It was a legal entity under public law until 1960, in the territory corresponding to the current municipality of Rio de Janeiro.

With the transfer of Brazil's federal capital to the city of Brasília, the new Federal District was created through the division of part of the state of Goiás on 21 April 1960. With the transfer of the federal capital, the former Federal District was transformed into the state of Guanabara, which in turn was merged with the state of Rio de Janeiro thus creating the municipality of Rio de Janeiro, the current capital of the state.
