= Neutral Municipality =

Administrative division of the Empire of Brazil

Neutral Municipality of the Court Município Neutro da Corte
- Neutral municipality of the Empire of Brazil
- 1834–1889
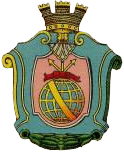
- Flag Coat of arms

- Map of the Neutral Municipality in 1880
- Capital: Rio de Janeiro
- Area
  - Coordinates: 22°54′S 43°11′W
  - 1872: 1,356 km^{2} (524 sq mi)
- Population
  - 1872: 274,972
- History
  - Established: 12 August 1834
  - Proclamation of the Republic: 15 November 1889
  - Republican constitution: 24 February 1891
Preceded by	Succeeded by
Province of Rio de Janeiro	Federal District
- Today part of: Rio de Janeiro; Niterói

The Neutral Municipality (Portuguese: Município Neutro), officially known during the imperial period as the Neutral Municipality of the Court (Município Neutro da Corte), was an administrative division of the Empire of Brazil. It covered the area of present-day Rio de Janeiro and existed from 12 August 1834, following the enactment of the Additional Act to the Constitution of 1824, until the proclamation of the republic on 15 November 1889. It only officially ceased to exist with the promulgation of the 1891 Constitution in 1891. The municipality was formally abolished under the 1891 Constitution, after which its territory became the Federal District of Brazil.

== History ==
After the Portuguese royal court was transferred to Rio de Janeiro in 1808, the captaincy came under direct administration of the central government, unlike other captaincies which enjoyed greater local autonomy.

Following Brazilian independence in 1822, Rio de Janeiro continued to be governed more directly than other provinces, largely because it remained the capital of the Viceroyalty of Brazil.

Furthermore, Rio de Janeiro remained as the capital of the Empire of Brazil, which caused the minister to administer the whole province using decrees, which he directed to the Municipal chambers of cities which, at that time, were growing at a rapid pace due to the expansion and strengthening of coffee plantations in the Paraíba Valley, which already surpassed the strength of sugarcane plantations in the North Fluminense region.

In 1834, the Additional Act created the Neutral Municipality, separating the city of Rio de Janeiro from the surrounding Province of Rio de Janeiro. While the municipality remained under direct imperial control as the seat of government, the province established its capital in Vila Real da Praia Grande (renamed Niterói (Note: At the time spelled "Nictheroy") in 1835).

The Neutral Municipality maintained its own elected municipal chamber, responsible for local administration, though certain services remained under national authority. After the proclamation of the republic in 1889, Rio de Janeiro continued to serve as Brazil's capital, and the Neutral Municipality was replaced by the Federal District under the Constitution of 1891.
