= Samuel Moreira =

Brazilian politician (born 1963)

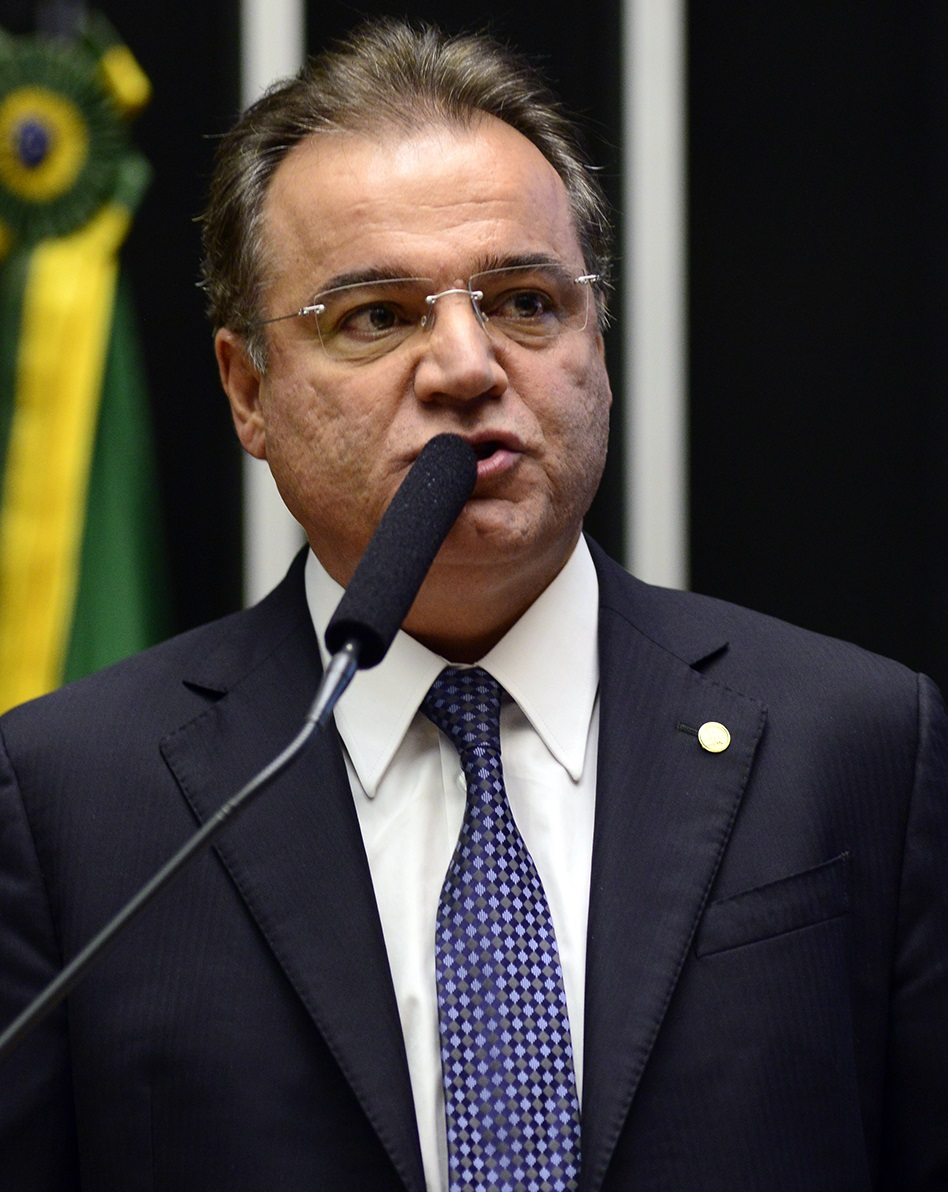
- Moreira in 2016

Member of the Chamber of Deputies
- In office 1 February 2015 – 31 January 2023
- Constituency: São Paulo

Personal details
- Born: 9 February 1963 (age 63)
- Party: Social Democratic Party (since 2024)

Samuel Moreira da Silva Júnior (born 9 February 1963) is a Brazilian politician. He has served as mayor of Registro since 2025, having previously served from 1997 to 2004. From 2015 to 2023, he was a member of the Chamber of Deputies.
