= Paraná Province =

Former province in Imperial Brazil

Paraná Province Província do Paraná
- Province of the Empire of Brazil
- 1853–1889
- Flag (unofficial) Coat of arms from Empire of Brazil

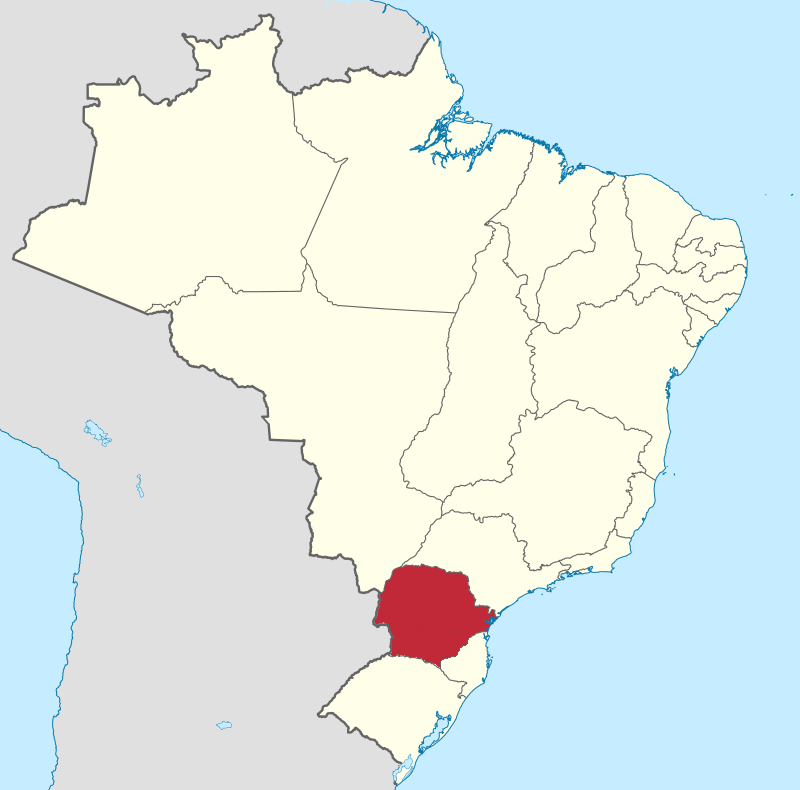
- Location in the Empire of Brazil
- Capital: Curitiba
- Demonym: Paranaense
- Population
  - 1872: 126,722
- Government
  - Type: Provincial government
- President
  - 1853–55: Zacarias de Góis (first)
  - 1889: Jesuíno Marcondes (last)
- Legislature: Provincial Assembly
- Historical era: 19th century
  - Creation: 29 August 1853
  - Statehood: 15 November 1889
- Political subdivisions: Municipalities
| Preceded by | Succeeded by |
| São Paulo | Paraná |
- Today part of: Brazil

The province of Paraná was one of the provinces of the Empire of Brazil. It was created by law on 29 August 1853, which split the comarca of Curitiba from the province of São Paulo and elevated it to the status of province.

In 1889, following the proclamation of the Republic in Brazil, it became the state of Paraná.

== History ==
The territory that eventually became the province of Paraná was a comarca of the captaincy of São Paulo. The region was neglected and suffered from lack of attention from the government of São Paulo, which prompted some of the locals to desire having a province of their own.

The political debate on the creation of the province of Paraná continued on 12 April 1843 when Joaquim José Pacheco, a general deputy for São Paulo, presented to the Chamber of Deputies of the Empire of Brazil a request for information on the pretensions of the inhabitants of the comarca of Curitiba to the Imperial government. The request also included data on the region's production, population and its borders. Its goal was to assist the evaluation of the necessity of the elevation of the comarca of Curitiba to the status of province.

Due to the province's lack of manpower to work on food supply, the provincial government soon began to promote immigration. On 21 March 1855 the local government sanctioned Law No. 29, promoting immigration from various nationalities.

== Gallery ==
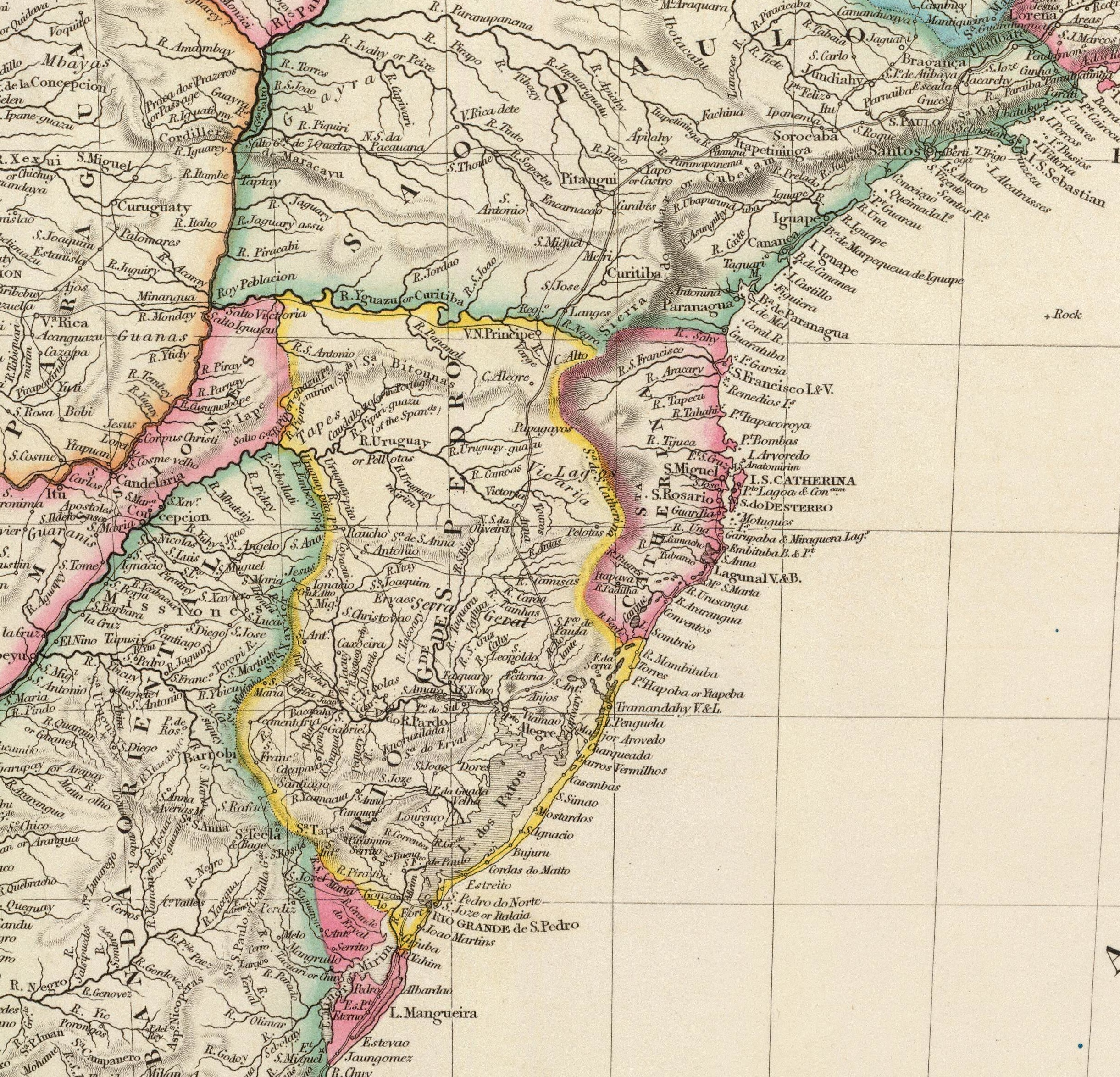
Map of the region in 1844 by John Arrowsmith, before the split

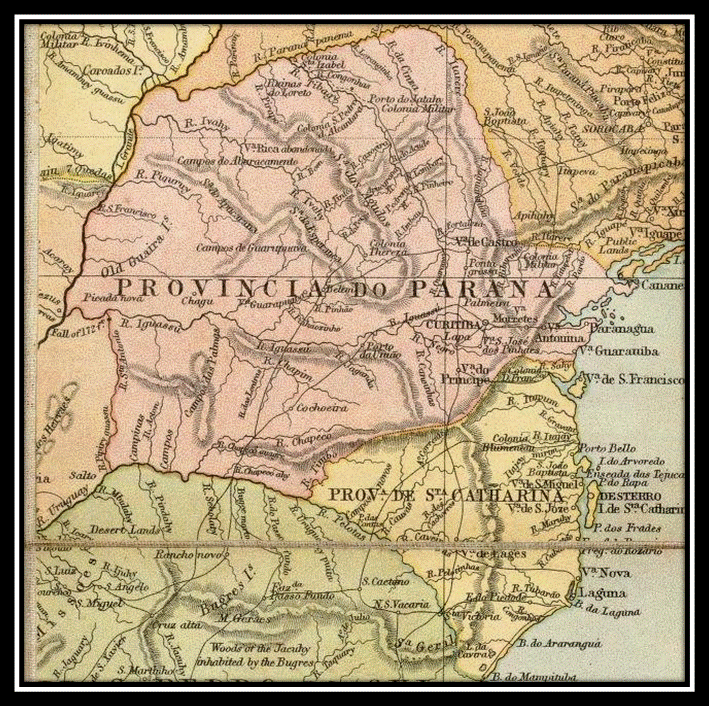
Map of the province in 1866

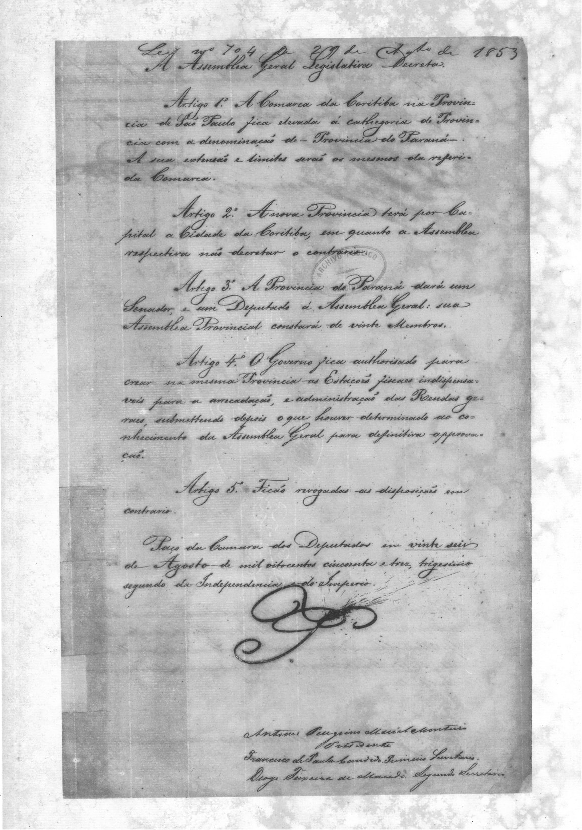
Imperial Law No. 704 of 29 August 1853 that created the province
