= São Paulo Province =

São Paulo Province Província de São Paulo
- 1821–1889
- Flag (unofficial)

- Status: Province of United Kingdom of Portugal, Brazil and the Algarves (1821–1822); Province of Empire of Brazil (1821–1889)
- Capital: São Paulo
- Common languages: Portuguese
- Religion: Roman Catholic
- Government: Constitutional monarchy
- Governor
  - 1821: João Carlos Augusto von Oyenhausen-Gravenburg
- Provincial President
  - 1821–1822: João Carlos Augusto von Oyenhausen-Gravenburg; José Bonifácio de Andrada e Silva (provisional government)
  - 1822–1823: Mateus de Abreu Pereira, José Correia Pacheco e Silva, Cândido Xavier de Almeida e Sousa (provisional triumvirate)
  - 1823–1824: Cândido Xavier de Almeida e Sousa (first)
  - 1889: José Vieira Couto de Magalhães (last)
- Legislature: Provincial Legislative Assembly
- History
  - Established: 1821
  - Disestablished: 1889
- Currency: Real
Preceded by	Succeeded by
Captaincy of São Paulo	Paraná Province; São Paulo (state)

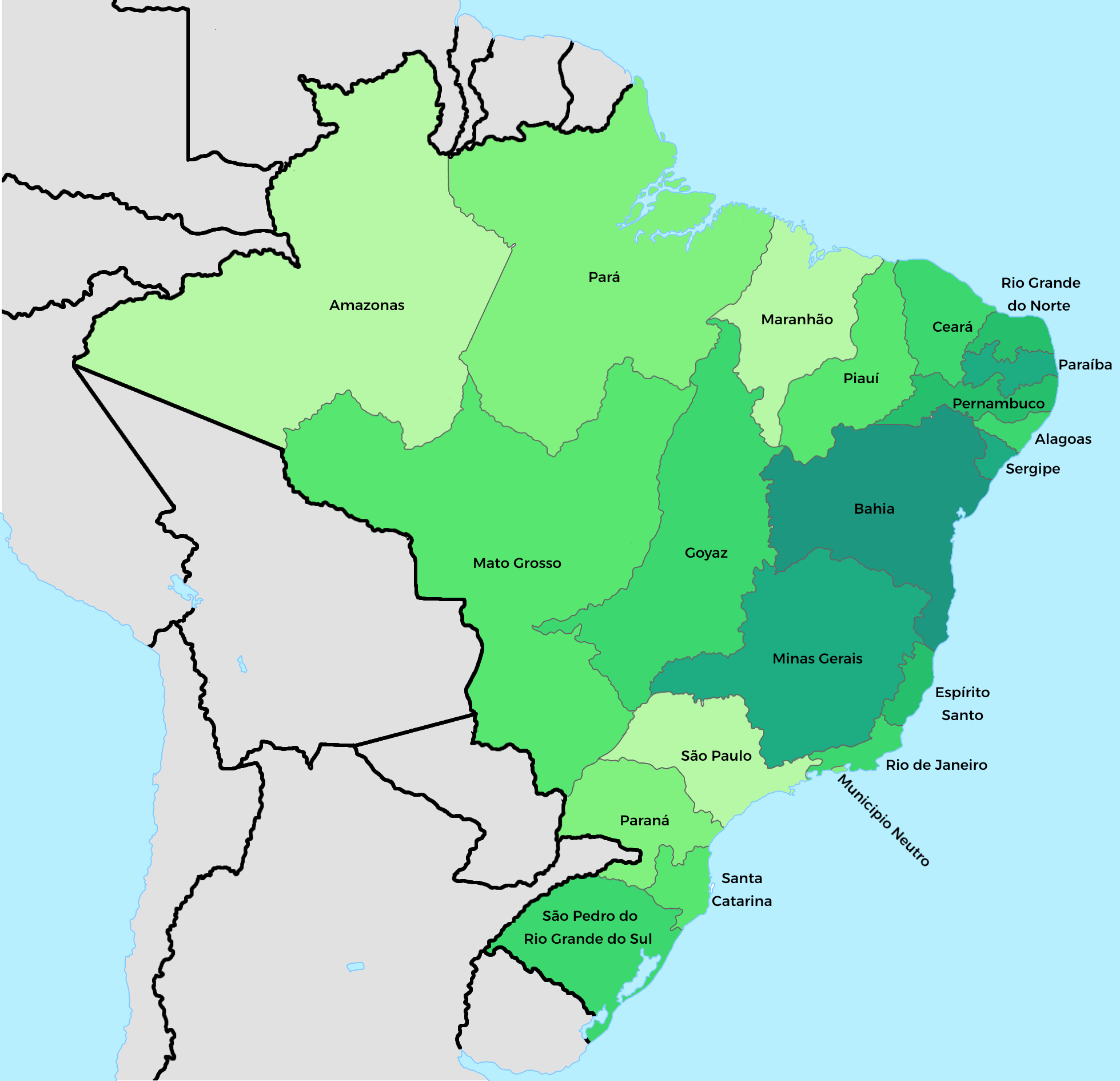
The Empire of Brazil, c. 1889.

São Paulo Province was one of the provinces of Brazil.

== See also ==
- List of governors of São Paulo
