= Pará Province =

Former province of the Empire of Brazil

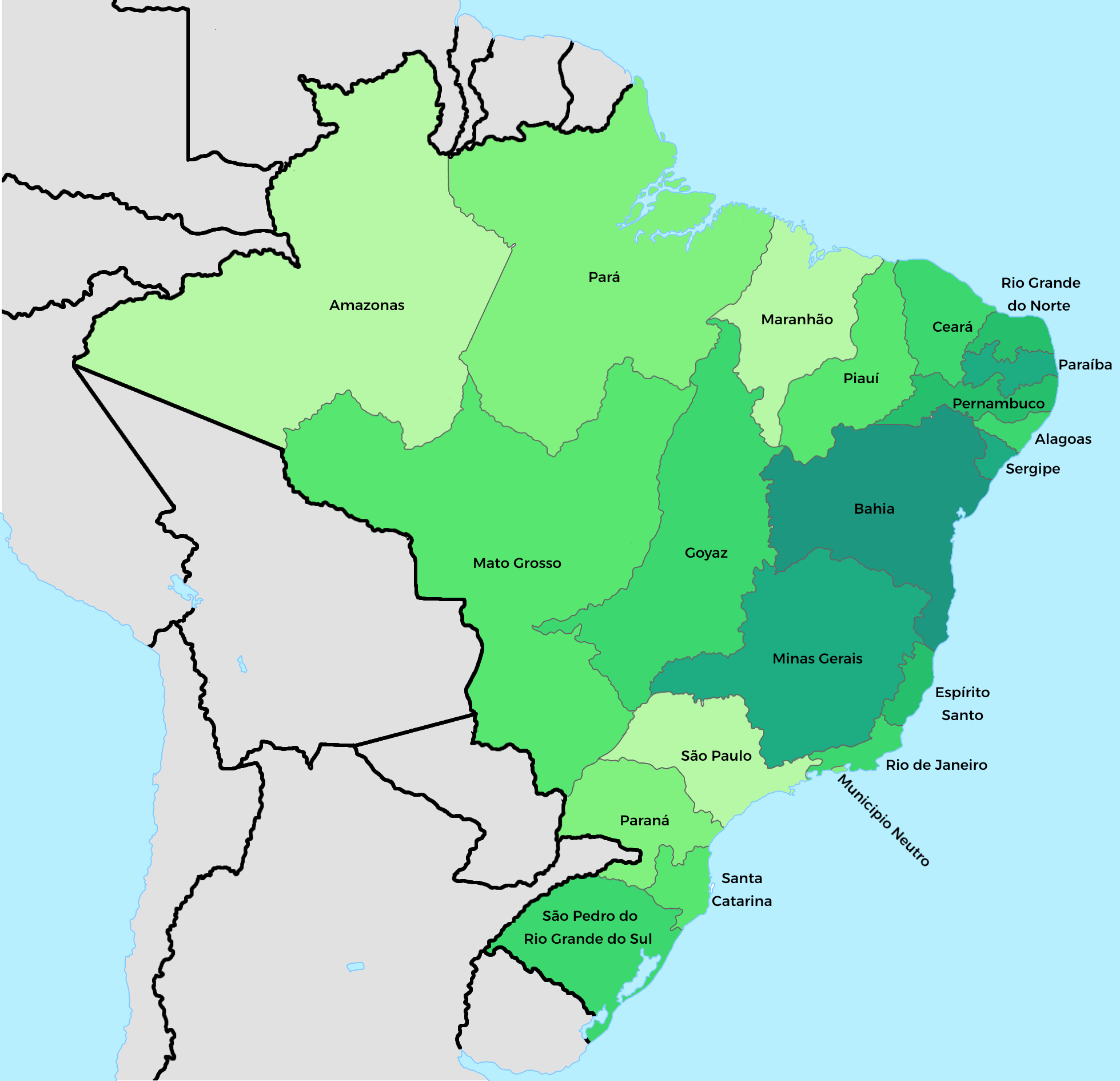
The Empire of Brazil, c. 1889.

Pará Province was one of the provinces of the Empire of Brazil. It was created in 1850 from territory of Grão-Pará Province.

In 1889 it became the state of Pará.

Its status was not defined until 1833, when the Penal Code downgraded the province to the status of a district subordinate to the province of Pará. The region regained its autonomy in 1850, with the creation of the province of Amazonas.
