= Mensalão scandal =

2005 vote-buying scandal in Brazil

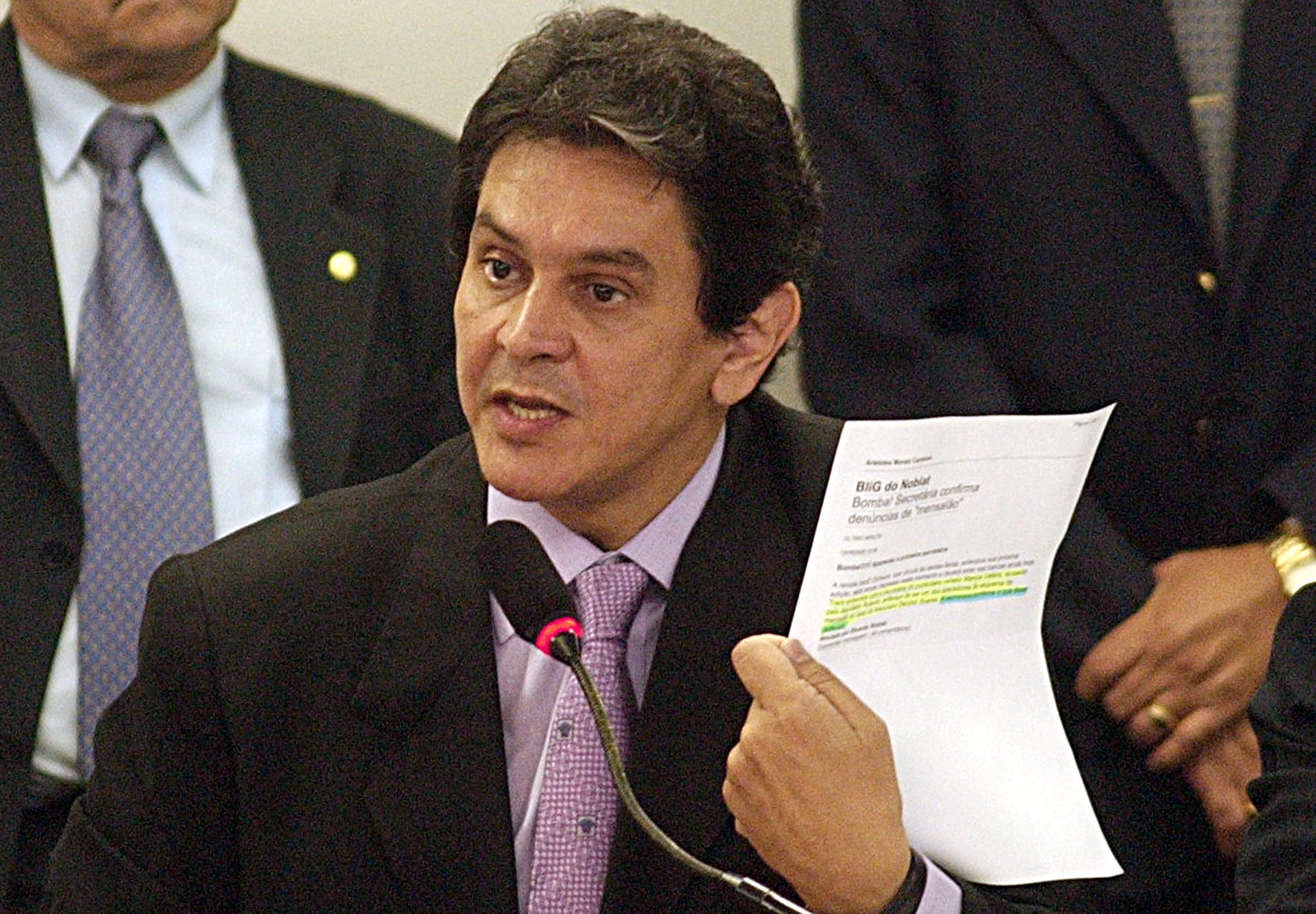
Roberto Jefferson was the whistleblower of the alleged corruption scheme.

The Mensalão scandal (Portuguese: Escândalo do Mensalão, IPA: [isˈkɐ̃dɐlu du mẽsɐˈlɐ̃w]) was a major parliamentary scandal in 2005 that threatened to bring down the government of Brazil, in which Luiz Inácio Lula da Silva's administration was accused of vote-buying. Mensalão is a neologism, an augmentative variant of the word for "monthly payment" (salário mensal or mensalidade).

The scandal broke on June 6, 2005 when Brazilian deputy Roberto Jefferson (Brazilian Labour Party) told the Folha de S.Paulo newspaper that the ruling Workers' Party (PT) had paid a number of deputies 30,000 reais (around US$12,000 at the time) a month to vote for legislation favored by the ruling party. The funds allegedly came from state-owned companies' advertising budgets, funneled through an advertising agency owned by Marcos Valério.

The investigation then implicated members of the Brazilian Social Democracy Party, Democrats, Brazilian Democratic Movement Party and seven other political parties also involved. Many key advisers to Lula resigned, and several deputies were faced with the choice of resignation or expulsion from congress. The president himself went on to be re-elected in 2006, and in 2010 Brazil elected his chief of staff, Dilma Rousseff, as president. Much of PT's leadership was affected in some way, with many resigning or failing to win re-election. Brazil's economy was widely perceived as not having been substantially impacted by the scandal.

Roberto Jefferson, who initially sparked the scandal, was expelled from the Chamber of Deputies on September 14, 2005 for ethical violations determined by the Congressional Council of Ethics. Despite continued additional resignations, in October the scandal died down somewhat as Brazil held a contentious referendum on a banning gun sales, an initiative soundly rejected by voters.

== Origins ==
When Lula was elected in 2003, his party held less than 20% of the seats in the Assembly. He put together a coalition of twelve parties, but since his appointees were primarily from his own party, the payments were intended to assure the continued support of other members of the coalition government.

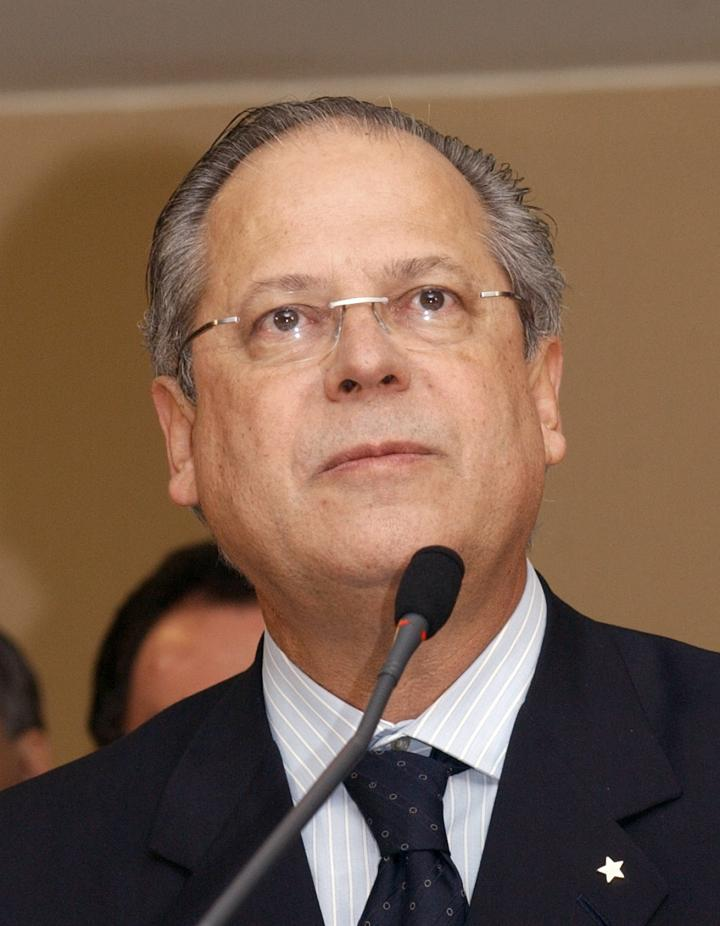
José Dirceu was the Chief of Staff of Brazil when the scandal broke. He was dropped after Jefferson described Dirceu as the ringleader of a plot to hand out illegal monthly payments to congressmen.

On September 18, 2004, Brazilian weekly magazine Veja printed a cover story entitled "Scandal: PT's buyout of PTB". The article described an alliance between the Workers Party (PT) and the Brazilian Labour Party (PTB). According to Veja, PT promised to pay R$150,000 to each PTB deputy if they would support the executive branch. Allegedly because these promises were not kept, a storm of corruption allegations against PT began in May 2005.

On September 24, 2004, the Rio de Janeiro newspaper Jornal do Brasil published an article citing Veja which also said that former Minister of Communications Miro Teixeira had revealed the monthly payments to the Ministry of Public Prosecution.

Jornal do Brasil then published another story saying that the president of the Chamber of Deputies João Paulo Cunha (PT) promised to fully investigate the claims and quoted president of the Popular Socialist Party (Brazil) Roberto Freire saying: "This subject has been circulating for months in Congress but nobody has the courage to approach it."

== The scandal emerges ==
On May 14, 2005, Veja published a new story describing an apparent corruption scheme in the Brazilian Postal Service, describing a 110-minute video recording, made with a hidden camera, that showed former Post Office Chief Maurício Marinho apparently receiving a bribe from a businessman. The full bribery scheme involving government contracts was allegedly administered by Post Office administrative director Antônio Osório Batista and by Jefferson, a Post Office manager as well as a federal deputy. On the tape, aired by the major Brazilian television stations, Marinho receives, then pockets, R$3,000 (about $1,259 US) in cash.

Agents from the Brazilian Intelligence Agency (ABIN) investigated. As the scandal developed, it was argued that this was linked to an attempt to destroy PT's former allies without the scandal exploding upon the government. However, a major political battle began when the government tried to systematically obstruct the creation of a Parliamentary Commission of Investigation (CPI) to investigate the growing corruption scandal.

On June 3, 2005 the newspaper Folha de S.Paulo published a story saying that the government was tying funds for various projects to support for the creation of the CPI. Because of these allegations, part of the government's base joined the opposition to support the creation of a Parliamentary Commission of Investigation. Abandoned by his allies, Jefferson began to counterattack. On June 6, Folha de S.Paulo published an interview with Jefferson claiming that Delúbio Soares, treasurer of the Workers' Party, made monthly payments of R$30,000 to certain Congressional deputies, to influence them to vote with the government. Jefferson said that those who received the monthly payment called it mensalão, derived from the Portuguese word for a monthly payment. "Mensalão" quickly became the adopted popular label for the scandal, now identified as the "escândalo do mensalão."

According to Jefferson, businessman Marcos Valério, owner of the advertising agencies SMPB and DNA, which had large government contracts, operated the scheme. After the investigative commission was set up, the government allegedly tried to control it by installing government allies Senator Delcídio do Amaral (PT) as president of the commission and Deputy Osmar Serraglio (PMDB) as the key rapporteur, responsible for writing the final report.

Although the investigation of the Post Office scandal was officially restricted in scope to irregularities in the Post Office's administration, it began to investigate the expanding monthly payment claims because of apparent connections between the cases. An additional commission was created to investigate the broader scandal on July 20. Allies of the government occupied key posts. The president of the CPI was Senator Amir Lando and the rapporteur was Deputy Ibrahim Abi-Ackel. Abi-Ackel had been minister of justice in the government of João Baptista Figueiredo, and had also been accused of involvement in the corruption scandal.

José Dirceu, once a leftist student leader who organized against the right-wing military dictatorship after it took power in a 1964 coup, was arrested in 1968, then released at the demand of the kidnappers of the US ambassador. He was exiled to Cuba. Later, he secretly returned to Brazil, under a false identity and had plastic surgery to disguise his face. He hid in Paraná and opened a shop. During this time, he became involved as a student union leader. He married but did not reveal his true identity even after he had a son with his wife. Only after 1979, when political amnesty was declared, did he openly return to political life, campaigning for democratic elections and the end of the dictatorship regime.

As a consequence of the mensalão scandal, Dirceu resigned in 2005 as chief of staff to President Lula.

== The scandal develops ==
In early July 2005, an advisor to a Congressional deputy and brother of Workers’ Party President José Genoíno, was stopped at an airport with $100,000 in his underwear and additional funds in his luggage. The wives and secretaries of key figures testified before numerous and overlapping Congressional panels, including Valério's secretary, Fernanda Karina Somaggio, and the ex-wife of Valdemar Costa Neto, Maria Christina Mendes Caldeira, who later fled to the United States with nothing but her clothes and a support animal. She applied for asylum under a secret identity.

Congressional hearings were often marked by fiery rhetoric and emotional outbursts, including numerous incidents of crying by witnesses and Workers' Party deputies. Although still murky and unclear, reported links between the scandal, its key figures, the murder of Santo André's mayor Celso Daniel and various mafia and criminal figures only intensified its sensational tone and societal impact, even though no proof of such links have been divulged. One key event that broadened the scandal into a more general investigation of the Workers' Party history as whole was the testimony of Duda Mendonça, public relations specialist and campaign manager for Lula's 2002 campaign, on August 11. He said he was paid using off-shore bank accounts and possibly illegal funds connected to Valério.

The scandal, which had at that time not yet involved finance minister Antonio Palocci, said to be popular with the international finance community, threatened his standing after lawyer and former advisor Rogério Tadeu Buratti testified that Palocci was involved in corrupt activities while he was mayor of Ribeirão Preto in the mid-1990s.

Lula's popularity waxed and waned, but no definite proof emerged that he orchestrated or had knowledge of the payments. Much of PT's leadership was affected in some way, with many resigning or failing to win re-election. Brazil's economy was widely perceived as not having been substantially impacted by the scandal.

Roberto Jefferson, who initially sparked the scandal, was expelled from the Chamber of Deputies on September 14, 2005 after the Congressional Council of Ethics determined that he had committed ethical violations. Despite continued resignations of those implicated, in October the scandal died down somewhat and Brazil had a referendum on gun sales that resulted in a loss for the government's position. At the end of October, Veja published a new story claiming that the Workers' Party had received illegal campaign funds from Cuba—threatening to re-intensify the scandal once again, though that was not ultimately the case.

== First joint preliminary CPI report ==
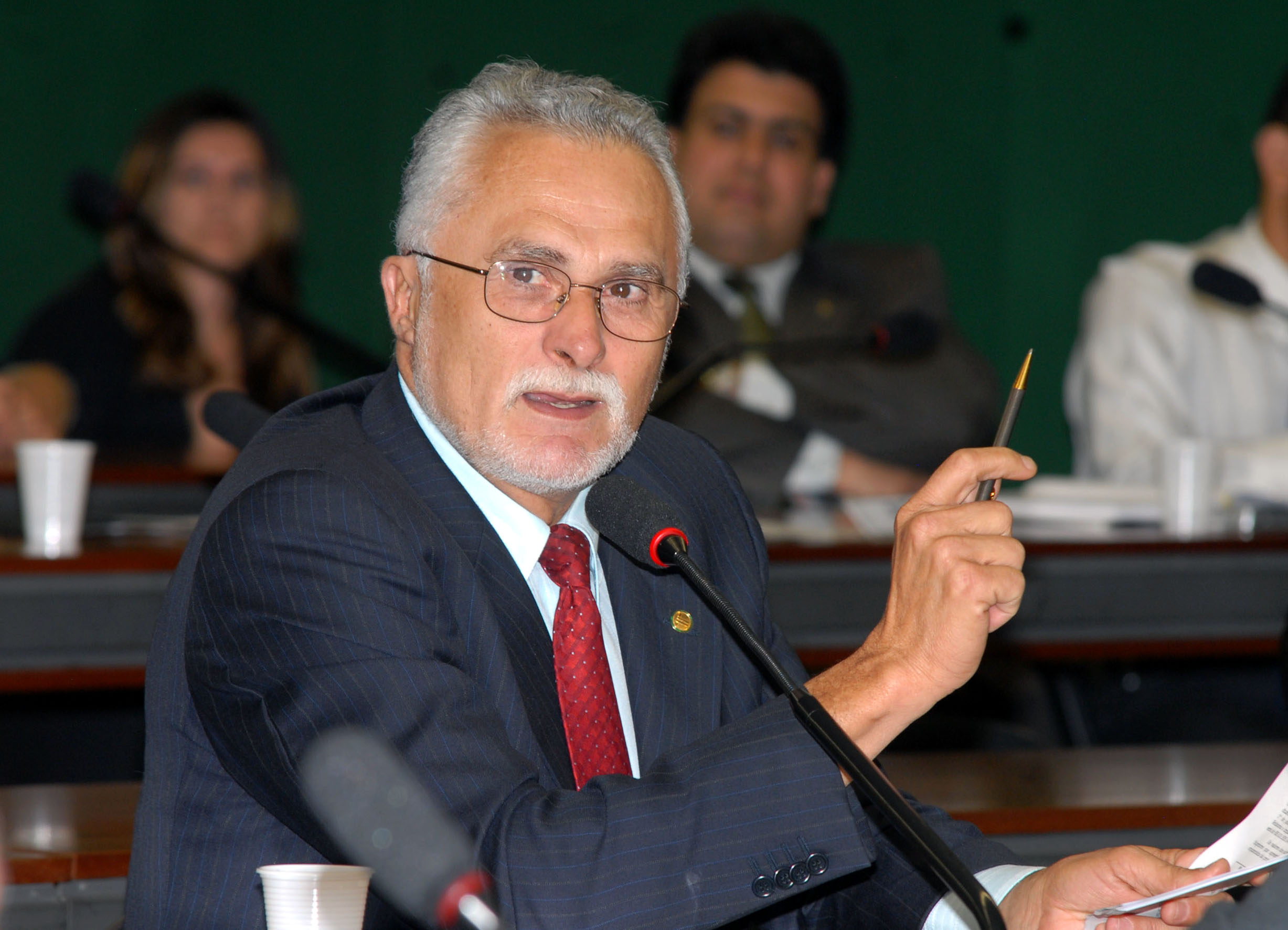
José Genoino was found guilty of bribery by the Supreme Federal Court for his involvement in the Mensalão scandal.

The investigations into Post Office corruption and vote-buying unanimously approved their first joint preliminary report on September 1, 2005.

The report accused 18 Brazilian deputies of involvement in the corruption scandal:

- Carlos Rodrigues (Liberal Party (PL)-Rio de Janeiro)
- José Janene (Progressive Party (PP)-Paraná)
- Pedro Corrêa (PP-Pernambuco)
- Pedro Henry (PP-Mato Grosso do Sul)
- Sandro Mabel (PL-Goiás)
- João Magno (PT-Minas Gerais)
- João Paulo Cunha (PT-São Paulo)
- José Borba (PMDB-Paraná)
- Josias Gomes (PT-Bahia)
- Paulo Rocha (PT-Bahia)
- Professor Luizinho (PT-São Paulo) - later acquitted and sufficiently angry about the accusation to take his underwear off in front of a group of reporters
- Vadão Gomes (PP-São Paulo)
- Vanderval Santos (PL-São Paulo)
- José Mentor (PT-São Paulo)
- Roberto Brant (Liberal Front Party (PFL)-Minas Gerais)
- José Dirceu (PT-São Paulo)
- Roberto Jefferson (PTB-Rio de Janeiro)

The report accused them of misdeeds ranging from illegal campaign finance activity, placing cronies in strategic positions in government-owned businesses in return for kickbacks, to taking cash payments for voting with the government in the Brazilian Congress.

The report states that as to the charges initially made by deputy Roberto Jefferson (PTB):

- Everything he said that could be verified appeared to be valid, including his own confessions.
- Everything he said, when compared to other testimony, showed a great degree of validity.

The report added that several documents had been identified and validated which proved that large sums of money were withdrawn from agencies of the Rural Bank in Brasília and Belo Horizonte, as well as from the bank accounts of the enterprises SMPB and DNA. According to the documents, the beneficiaries were federal deputies who received funds in person or through relatives, advisers, or individuals chosen by Marcos Valério. Some payments were made monthly, and others either more or less frequently. The report called the defense made by some parliamentarians that the funds were used to settle debts from electoral campaigns a "lame excuse".

== Congressional Committees of Investigation (CPIs) ==
The following CPIs were involved in investigating issues related to the cash-for-votes scandal.

- Post Office CPI: Created June 9, 2005, to investigate alleged irregularities and corruption in the Brazilian Post Office following allegations made by Deputy Roberto Jefferson, this CPI focused on alleged payments made to Brazilian deputies by the ruling party. The scheduled end of the investigation was February 21, 2006.
- Bingo CPI: Created on June 19, 2005, to investigate money laundering through bingo parlours, and the relationship between bingo and organized crime. The CPI was proposed after a tape revealed that Waldomiro Diniz (an advisor to José Dirceu) apparently extorted the gambling mafia of Rio de Janeiro to obtain funds for Workers' Party political campaigns. The end of this work was scheduled for October 26, 2005.
- Vote-buying CPI: Created July 20, 2005, to investigate alleged monthly payments to deputies. The Workers' Party requested a parallel investigation of the electoral reform that allowed a second term for ex-President Fernando Henrique Cardoso (PSDB). The end of this committee's work was scheduled for November 16, 2005.

Members of the opposition also wanted a fourth CPI to investigate off-book accounts held by all parties during the most recent elections. Due to serial allegations of this kind of operation in many campaigns in 2002, including President Lula's, many believed this CPI could result in a legal and concrete reason to start his impeachment process. However, this process was aborted.

== Ethics Council ==
The Council of Ethics and Parliamentary Decorum of the House is responsible for processing and disciplining members for behavior not in concordance with parliamentary decorum.

To expel a deputy, 257 votes out of 513 are needed. Expelled deputies lose their seats and also their parliamentary privileges and immunity. Members can also be barred from holding public office for eight years. Jefferson for example cannot run for office again until 2015.

== Supreme Court indictment ==
On August 24, 2007, the Supreme Federal Court, responsible for criminal proceedings against parliamentarians due to parliamentary immunity, accepted the indictments of 40 individuals related to the Mensalão scandal, most of them former or current federal deputies, and all of whom were or are allies of former Brazilian president Luiz Inácio Lula da Silva.

== Supreme Court trial ==
The trial began in August 2012.

In the first 23 sessions of the trial the Supreme Court found that misuse of public money and bank loans did occur. Ten of the 37 defendants received sentences, including Marcos Valério, a ringleader. Three were acquitted.

On 15 September 2012 Veja published a new story alleging that Valério had told friends that former president Lula masterminded the corruption scheme. José Dirceu's allies called this a lie and said Valério was out of his head and desperate, a convict facing prison.

On September 17 the court began to examine the primary accusation, which included allegations that Dirceu led of the vote-buying scheme which laundered and then disbursed millions in public and private money to secure votes in Congress from 2003 to 2005. The rapporteur found clear evidence that such activities occurred, saying "there is no doubt that this scheme existed."

On 9 October 2012, the court found Dirceu, José Genoino and Delúbio Soares guilty of bribery (Corrupção Ativa). On 15 November 2013 the STF president ordered them imprisoned. This coincided with the anniversary of the proclamation of the Republic so there was much debate about Barbosa's reasons for waiting until then. Some days later Genoino was transferred to house arrest out of concerns about his health.

== Timing of key withdrawals and votes ==
Documents from the Conselho de Controle de Atividades Financeiras (COAF) indicate that between July and May 2003, withdrawals of 27 million reais were made from the accounts of businessman Marcos Valério.

According to deputy Roberto Jefferson, the money for the mensalão came from Banco Rural and the Banco do Brasil. Documents from COAF validate the withdrawals from Banco Rural; the withdrawals from Banco do Brasil have not yet been traced.

The table below shows a side-by-side description of some of the withdrawals and allegedly connected votes in the Senate and Chamber of Deputies.

Withdrawals that Possibly Connected Votes in the Legislative
Vote	Withdrawal
Tax reform approved, September 24, 2003	R$1.212 million between September 23, 25, and 26, 2003
Modified Tax reform bill in Senate, December 17, 2003	R$470,000 between December 17 and 19, 2003
Provisional measure for the minimum wage approved in the House, June 2, 2004	R$500,000
Provisional measure for minimum wage approved June 23 in the House after being passed in the Senate	R$200,000
Status of the Central Bank President, December 1, 2004 (House)	R$480,000 on November 29 and 30, 2004
Bingo reform approved, March 30, 2004 (House)	R$200,000 on March 29, 2004
Social Security reform approved (first round, House), August 5, 2003	R$200,000 on August 6, 2003
Social Security reform approved (second round, House), August 27, 2003	R$200,000 between August 25 and 26
Social Security reform approved (Senate), November 26, 2003	R$400,000 November 26 and 26, 2003
Social Security reform approved (Senate, second round), December 11, 2003	R$120,000, December 10, 2003

== Principal figures in the scandal ==
=== Workers Party ===
1. José Dirceu, accused by Jefferson of being the leader of the scheme. Sentenced to ten years and ten months.
2. José Genoíno, president of PT, suspected in connection with his brother, deputy José Guimarães (politician), whose political advisor was caught trying to go through airport security with wads of cash in his underwear. Sentenced to six years and eleven months.
3. Delúbio Soares, treasurer of PT
4. Luiz Inácio Lula da Silva, president of Brazil. The scandal occurred during his term, so is much debate about his role in it, if any. Later Jefferson said Lula did know of the scheme but so far Lula has not been charged.
5. Marcelo Sereno, National leader of PT
6. Silvio Pereira, National leader of PT, who received a Land Rover from a Petrobras supplier
7. João Paulo Cunha (PT-São Paulo) - Ex-Speaker of the House. Witnesses testified they saw his wife visiting Banco Rural in Brasília
8. Paulo Rocha (PT-Pará) - Former leader of PT in the House. An adviser of his was seen outside the Banco Rural.
9. Luiz Carlos da Silva, known as Professor Luizinho (PT-São Paulo) - Former leader of the government in the House. An adviser who received R$20,000 from Marcos Valério
10. José Mentor (PT-São Paulo) - His office received R$60,000.00 from a Banco Rural account belonging to Marcos Valério
11. José Guimarães (politician) (PT-Ceará) - Brother of PT party chief José Genou. His adviser was caught with US$100,000.00 in his underwear and R$200,000.00 in a suitcase while trying to pass through airport security. Guimarães was also accused of receiving R$250,000.00 from the accounts of Marcos Valério.
12. José Adalberto Vieira da Silva (PT-Ceará) adviser to José Nobre Guimarães, found to have money hidden in his underpants.
13. Josias Gomes (PT-Bahia) - suspected of personally withdrawing R$100,000 from the accounts of Marcos Valério.
14. Luiz Gushiken, former secretary of communication, accused of issues relating to his former firms. He was cleared of all charges during the trial, but died of cancer a few months later.

=== Allied figures ===
The following members of other parties that gave political support to the Workers' Party before the scandal: PTB, PP, PL, and the PMDB.

1. Roberto Jefferson (PTB-Rio de Janeiro) - Deputy who sparked the scandal with his initial allegations. Accused of operating a corruption scheme using state enterprises and the Post Office. Also accused of receiving millions of dollars from Marcos Valério to assist PTB electoral efforts without declaring it to the electoral oversight authorities
2. José Carlos Martinez (PTB-Paraná) - Deputy, deceased. Accused of receiving R$1,000,000
3. José Janene (PP-Paraná) - Cited by Jefferson from the beginning of the scandal. Accused of distributing the mensalão to the PP parliamentary party. His involvement was confirmed by testimony from his advisor João Cláudio Genu to the Federal Police, who confessed to making the withdrawals and delivering the money to the treasury of the PP
4. Pedro Corrêa (PP-Pernambuco) - President of the PP, also accused by Jefferson and incriminated by Genu
5. Pedro Henry (PP-Mato Grosso) - Former leader of the House, implicated by the testimony of Genu
6. José Borba (PMDB-Paraná) - Former head of the PMDB in the House. Accused of receiving R$2.1 million by the financial director of Valério's firm, SMPB, but of refusing to sign a receipt for the withdrawal, which forced an SMPB employee to go to the bank branch to release the payment
7. Valdemar Costa Neto (PL-São Paulo) - Accused of distributing the mensalão to the bench of the PL. His ex-treasurer, Jacinto Lamas, was accused of being the main beneficiary of withdrawals from the accounts of Marcos Valério in Banco Rural, receiving R$10,837,500. To avoid removal from his seat in Congress, resigned on August 1, before an inquiry could be opened.
8. Bishop Rodrigues (PL-Rio de Janeiro) - Coordinated the grouping of members of the Universal Church of the Kingdom of God in the House. Accused of receiving R$150,000. Was afterwards expelled from the church.
9. Anderson Adauto (PL-Minas Gerais) - Former Minister of Transportation, accused of receiving, through his chief of staff, one million reals from Marcos Valério

=== Others ===
1. Marcos Valério - Businessman. Accused of being the operator of the "mensalão", supposedly operated several public relations firms and advertising agencies whose bank accounts were used to distribute funds to members of the Workers' Party and other allied Brazilian parties. Accused of participating in Eduardo Azeredo's off-book accounting.
2. Duda Mendonça - Campaign manager and public relations specialist who led Lula's presidential campaign. His partner, Zilmar da Silveira, appears in records as a recipient of funds from Marcos Valério (R$15,500,000)
3. Fernanda Karina Somaggio - Secretary to Marcos Valério. Her calendar was seized by the Federal Police of Brazil. She confirmed Valério's connection to Delúbio Soares and other deputies accused of involvement in the scheme and charged that payments were made with suitcases full of money.
4. Renilda Soares - Valério's wife. Accused José Dirceu of knowing much about the corruption scheme
5. Toninho da Barcelona - also known as Antonio Oliveira Claramunt. One of the principal Brazilian foreign exchange specialists, who is accused of sending $500 million abroad between 1996 and 2002. Arrested for illegal financial activities, he alleged that he carried out various exchanges for PT and other parties and claimed PT maintained a secret foreign bank account.
6. Rogério Buratti - ex-advisor to Antonio Palocci. Arrested August 16, 2005, accused of fraud in contracts between the district of Ribeirão Preto and garbage collection firms, as well as money laundering, and extortion. Said that in the administration of Antonio Palocci a corruption scheme diverted funds to the Workers' Party
7. Sérgio Gomes da Silva, aka "the Shadow" - Businessman and ex-bodyguard of Santo André mayor Celso Daniel. Accused of ordering the mayor's assassination
8. Maria Christina Mendes Caldeira - ex-wife of deputy Valdemar Costa Neto. Accused her former husband of receiving mensalão as well as intermittent donations from Taiwanese businessmen.

== Major businesses involved ==
=== Brazil ===
==== State companies ====
- Furnas – power utility
- Eletronuclear – power utility
- Petrobras – oil company
- Instituto de Resseguros do Brasil (IRB) – reinsurance company
- Empresa Brasileira de Correios e Telégrafos (EBCT) – Brazilian Post Office
- Caixa de Previdência dos Funcionários do Banco do Brasil (Previ)

==== Private companies ====
- Guaranhuns (front company)
- DNA (business of Marcos Valério)
- SMP&B (business of Marcos Valério, Cristiano Paz and Ramon Cardoso)

==== Financial institutions ====
- Banco Rural: used by Marcos Valério for his operations
- Banco do Brasil: used by Marcos Valério for his operations

==== United States ====
- Bank of Beacon Hill: used by Marcos Valério for his operations

== Figures who lost their posts ==
1. Mauricio Marinho, Post Office Chief, May 14
2. The director of the Post Office Administration, Antonio Osório Batista and his assistant Fernando Godoy, May 16
3. Luiz Appolonio Neto, President of the Instituto de Resseguros do Brasil (IRB), May 21
4. The leadership of the Correios and of the IRB, June 7
5. The directors of electrical firms: Dimas Fabiano Toledo, Rodrigo Botelho Campos and José Roberto Cesaroni Cury, June 30
6. José Dirceu, Presidential Chief of Staff, June 14
7. Roberto Jefferson, President of PTB, June 17
8. Silvio Pereira, Secretary-General of PT, July 4
9. Delúbio Soares, Treasurer of PT, July 5
10. Glenio Guedes, Director of the Conselho de Recursos do Sistema Financeiro, July 6
11. José Adalberto Vieira da Silva, aide to deputy José Nobre Guimarães, July 8
12. José Nobre Guimarães, manager of the state directory of PT-CE, July 9
13. José Genoino, President of the Workers' Party (PT), July 9
14. Marcelo Sereno, Communication Secretary of PT, July 9
15. Henrique Pizzolato, Director of marketing of the Banco do Brasil, July 10
16. Luiz Gushiken, Ministério da Comunicação e Gestão Estratégica, demoted, July 12.
17. Luiz Gushiken was downgraded again. Left position as at Secretary of Communication to become an adviser to President Lula, July 21
18. Valdemar Costa Neto, Federal deputy and president of the Liberal Party (PL), resigned his mandate, August 1
19. Marcio Lacerda, executive secretary in the Ministry of National Integration, August 2
20. Manoel Severino, President of the Casa da Moeda do Brasil, tendered resignation, August 3
21. Danilo de Camargo, Coordinator of the Commission of Ethics in PT, August 6
22. Juscelino Antonio Dourado, Cabinet chief of Finance Minister, September 1

== See also ==
- Timeline of the Mensalão scandal
- Corruption in Brazil
- List of scandals in Brazil
- Operation Car Wash
- Panama Papers
