= Alfredo Gaspar =

Brazilian politician (born 1970)

- Gaspar in 2026

Member of the Chamber of Deputies
- Incumbent
- Assumed office 1 February 2023
- Constituency: Alagoas

Secretary of Public Security of Alagoas
- In office 8 January 2021 – 21 March 2022
- Governor: Renan Filho
- Preceded by: Lima Júnior
- Succeeded by: Coronel Elias
- In office 1 January 2015 – 23 March 2016
- Governor: Renan Filho
- Preceded by: Diógenes Tenório de Albuquerque
- Succeeded by: Lima Júnior

Prosecutor General of Alagoas
- In office 1 January 2017 – 2 March 2020
- Governor: Renan Filho
- Preceded by: Sérgio Jucá
- Succeeded by: Márcio Roberto Tenório de Albuquerque

Personal details
- Born: Alfredo Gaspar de Mendonça Neto; 13 August 1970 (age 56) Maceió, Alagoas, Brazil
- Party: PL (since 2026)
- Other political affiliations: MDB (2020–2022); Brazil Union (2022–2026)
- Spouse: Adriana Andrade (m. 1990)
- Children: 4
- Education: Centro Universitário CESMAC (LLB)

Alfredo Gaspar de Mendonça Neto (born 13 August 1970) is a Brazilian politician serving as a member of the Chamber of Deputies since 2023. He served as secretary of public security of Alagoas from 2015 to 2016 and from 2021 to 2022.

On 5 August 2026, Gaspar was announced as the vice-presidential candidate on Flávio Bolsonaro's ticket for the 2026 Brazilian elections.

== Family background and personal life ==
He is the youngest son of Carlos Alberto Pinheiro de Mendonça and Felina Teixeira Gama de Mendonça. His grandfather had also been a public prosecutor and later served as president of the Alagoas State Court of Justice, in addition to working as a university professor. At age 20, Gaspar married Adriana Andrade, daughter of former Alagoas governor Moacir Lopes de Andrade. Their first daughter, Ana Luisa, was born when he was 21; she was later diagnosed with cancer and died at one year and eight months old after months of treatment. The couple later had two more children, Catarina and Carlos. In May 2020, both of his parents contracted COVID-19; Gaspar was also hospitalized, and his father died from the disease. Gaspar is a Roman Catholic.

== Legal career ==
Gaspar was appointed to a prosecutor's post in the city of Maravilha, Alagoas, on April 8, 1996, and later that same year moved to a prosecutor's post in Palmeira dos Índios. In 1997 he was assigned to the prosecutor's office in Maceió, where he held several posts over the years.

=== Entry into public administration ===
In 2015, then-governor Renan Filho invited him to serve as Alagoas' Secretary of State for Social Defense, temporarily stepping away from the Public Prosecutor's Office to join the executive branch (taking office via decree on January 1, 2015). In March 2016, a Brazilian Supreme Federal Court ruling barred members of the Public Prosecutor's Office from holding political posts in the executive branch, forcing him to leave the secretariat and return to the Alagoas Public Prosecutor's Office.

=== Prosecutor-General of Alagoas ===
Back at the Public Prosecutor's Office, he ran unopposed for Prosecutor-General of Justice of Alagoas and won, taking office on January 1, 2017, for a two-year term (2017–2018). He was reappointed for a second term starting January 1, 2019. He remained in the role until March 2, 2020, when he resigned from the Public Prosecutor's staff (as a third-tier prosecutor); his resignation was published in the state's official gazette on March 3, 2020, and republished March 4, 2020. He was also elected president of the National Group to Combat Organized Crime (GNCOC).

== Political career ==
=== 2020 mayoral run ===
After resigning as prosecutor, Gaspar ran for Mayor of Maceió in 2020. He won the first round with 110,234 votes (28.87%), narrowly ahead of João Henrique Caldas, who had 109,053 votes (28.56%). However, he lost the runoff to JHC (Brazilian Socialist Party, PSB).

=== Return to state security post and 2022 election ===
In January 2021, Governor Renan Filho appointed him Secretary of Public Security for Alagoas; he resigned in March 2022 to run for office. Later in 2022, he broke with Renan Filho over the governor's alliance with state assembly president Marcelo Victor — an alliance that led to Paulo Dantas being installed as a caretaker governor and set up for direct re-election. As a result, Gaspar left the MDB party for União Brasil, breaking politically with the Calheiros family faction, and ran for federal deputy under the União Brasil banner. In the 2022 elections, he was elected Federal Deputy for Alagoas, finishing as the second most-voted candidate in the state overall and the most-voted candidate in the capital, Maceió, with 102,039 votes.

=== INSS Parliamentary Inquiry Committee ===
Gaspar was rapporteur of the Parliamentary Inquiry Committee that investigated the INSS fraud scheme, which began on 20 August 2025. On 27 March 2026, he called for the indictment of Lulinha, son of President Luiz Inácio Lula da Silva, along with 216 other individuals under investigation. The report sought Lulinha's arrest on charges of influence peddling, money laundering or concealment of assets, criminal organization, and passive corruption. Gaspar justified the request for pretrial detention by citing Lulinha's departure from Brazil to Spain. The committee concluded on 28 March 2026, when the report was rejected by a vote of 19 to 12.

== Controversies ==
=== Federal funds transfer investigation ===
In August 2026, an audit by Brazil's Federal Court of Accounts (TCU) found irregularities in a R$6.2 million transfer, known in Brazil as an "emenda Pix" (a direct, no-agreement transfer of federal funds), that Gaspar had directed to the municipality of São José da Laje, Alagoas, in 2024. The audit reported failures in the transfer submitted by the deputy to the municipality of roughly 20,800 residents, and auditors found that the traceability of the funds had been lost because money was moved out of the earmark's designated account into other accounts. The report also noted the municipality had failed to file a required management report in the federal Transferegov system. Based on this finding, congressman Lindbergh Farias had asked federal prosecutors to investigate, but in May 2026 the deputy prosecutor-general closed the request, concluding there was no evidence directly implicating Gaspar, since the management of the funds is the responsibility of the municipal government that received them. Gaspar's office maintained that he was not personally under investigation and that the funds had been transferred in accordance with the law.

The case resurfaced days later as part of a broader probe. On 7 August 2026, Supreme Federal Court Justice Flávio Dino ordered the Federal Police to investigate a wider TCU audit that found irregularities in 82% of a sample of 100 special transfers, pointing to a potential loss to public coffers of R$49.1 million. The irregularities affected 61 of the 74 states and municipalities examined, out of R$198.1 million in transfers reviewed, with the estimated damage representing about 25% of that total. Among the transfers cited was Gaspar's earmark to São José da Laje, which auditors said could not be traced after being moved between the municipal administration's bank accounts. At that stage, individual lawmakers named in the report, including Gaspar and Chamber of Deputies president Hugo Motta, were not personally under investigation, though they could become targets as the Federal Police probe advances. Gaspar again stated through his office that he was not a subject of the inquiry.

== Electoral history ==
Year	Election	Party	Office	Coalition	Partners	Party	Votes	Percent	Result
2020	Mayoral Election of Maceió	MDB	Mayor	Maceió Stronger (MDB, PODE, PL, Avante, PRTB, PSC, PTC, PV, PSD)	Tácio Melo	PODE	110,234	28.87%	Runoff
2020	Mayoral Election of Maceió	MDB	Mayor	Maceió Stronger (MDB, PODE, PL, Avante, PRTB, PSC, PTC, PV, PSD)	Tácio Melo	PODE	156,704	41.36%	Not elected
2022	State Elections of Alagoas	UNIÃO	Congressman	—N/a			102,039	6.17%	Elected
2026	Presidential election	PL	Vice President	—N/a	Flavio Bolsonaro	PL	56,104,503	47.03%	Runoff
2026	Presidential election	PL	Vice President	—N/a	Flavio Bolsonaro	PL	59,826,041	48.21%	Not elected

Party political offices
Preceded by Walter Braga Netto	PL nominee for Vice President of Brazil; 2026	Most recent
