= Paulo Rocha (Brazilian politician) =

Brazilian politician

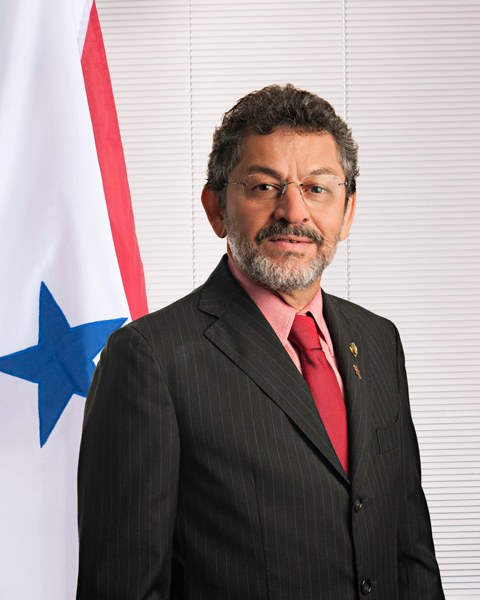

Senator for Pará
- In office February 1, 2015 – February 1, 2023

Member of the Chamber of Deputies
- In office February 1, 2007 – February 1, 2011
- Constituency: Pará
- In office February 1, 1991 – October 17, 2005
- Constituency: Pará

Personal details
- Born: Paulo Roberto Galvão da Rocha; April 1, 1951 (age 75) Curuçá, Pará, Brazil
- Party: PT (1981–present)
- Profession: Technician in graphic arts
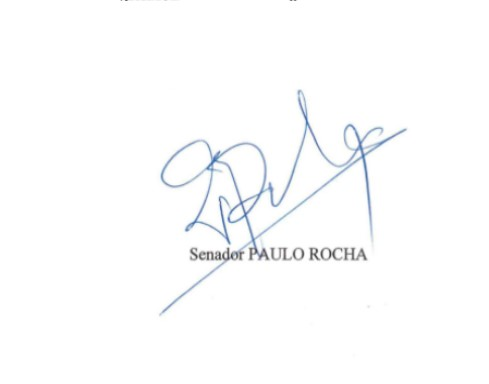
- Signature

Paulo Roberto Galvão da Rocha (born April 1, 1951) is a Brazilian politician. He had represented Pará in the Federal Senate from 2015 to 2023. Previously, he was a deputy from Pará from 1991 to 2005 and from 2007 to 2011. He is a member of the Workers' Party.

== Controversies ==
Paulo Rocha resigned from his seat as a federal deputy and from his leadership role in the Workers' Party (PT) on October 17, 2005, after his name was linked to the Mensalão scandal. The investigation revealed that one of his aides, Anita Leocádia, had withdrawn 620,000 reais from Marcos Valério's accounts at Banco Rural. He was indicted and faced charges of money laundering but was ultimately acquitted by the Supreme Federal Court (STF).

On June 17, 2025, the news outlet Metrópoles reported that Paulo Rocha had submitted amendments, drafted by the Confederation itself, that benefited Contag in facilitating illegal deductions as part of a social security (INSS) fraud scheme.

On October 12, 2026, Paulo Rocha was detained and taken to a police station following a disturbance at a wedding reception in Belém, Pará. According to reports, the politician was accused of assaulting women and causing a scene during the event. In a recorded video, he appeared visibly intoxicated and out of control, and was forcibly removed from the party. In a statement, the politician apologized for the incident and admitted he had gone too far, though he denied committing any assaults.
