= Liberal Party (Brazil) =

Conservative political party in Brazil

Liberal Party Partido Liberal
- Abbreviation: PL
- Leader: Flávio Bolsonaro
- President: Valdemar Costa Neto
- General Secretary: Mariucia Tozatti
- First Treasurer: Jucivaldo Salazar
- International Secretary: Eduardo Bolsonaro
- Founded: 26 October 2006; 20 years ago (as the Party of the Republic); 7 May 2019; 7 years ago (current form)
- Registered: 19 December 2006; 19 years ago
- Merger of: Liberal Party (1985); PRONA
- Headquarters: Edifício Liberty Mall Asa Norte, Brasília, Federal District
- Think tank: Instituto Fundação Alvaro Valle
- Youth wing: PL Jovem
- Women's wing: PL Mulher
- Membership (2024): ▲939,614
- Ideology: Bolsonarism; National conservatism (Brazil); Right-wing populism; Historical: Liberalism (Brazilian); Social liberalism; Big tent
- Political position: Right-wing to far-right Historically: Centre-right
- Colours: Green; Yellow; Blue; White
- Slogan: Liberdade, Verdade e Fé, pelo bem do Brasil ('Freedom, Truth and Faith, for the good of Brazil')
- TSE Identification Number: 22
- Federal Senate: 29 / 81
- Chamber of Deputies: 121 / 513
- Governorships: 6 / 27
- Mayors: 517 / 5,568
- State Assemblies: 129 / 1,024
- City Councillors: 4,929 / 56,810
- Mercosur Parliament: 7 / 38

Party flag

Website
- partidoliberal.org.br
- Politics of Brazil; Political parties; Elections; A: Before its rightward shift, it was classified as a centre-right party, part of the Centrão.

The Liberal Party (Portuguese: Partido Liberal, PL) is a right-wing to far-right Bolsonarist political party in Brazil. From its foundation in 2006 until 2019, it was called the Party of the Republic (Portuguese: Partido da República, PR).

The party was founded in 2006 as a merger of the 1985 Liberal Party and the Party of the Reconstruction of the National Order (PRONA), as a big tent, centre-right party, and was considered part of the Centrão, a bloc of parties without consistent ideological orientation that support different sides of the political spectrum in order to gain political privileges. As such, it supported the government of Luiz Inácio Lula da Silva and Dilma Rousseff—members of the centre-left Workers' Party (PT)—and Michel Temer.

In 2021, it became the base of the then-president of Brazil Jair Bolsonaro for the 2022 Brazilian general election. This led to many of his supporters joining the party, which thereby became the largest bloc in the National Congress of Brazil.

== History ==
The Party of the Republic was founded on 26 October 2006, by the merger of the old Liberal Party—which initially started as a classical liberal party, but slowly shifted towards social conservatism after it became influenced by evangelicals—and the Party of the Reconstruction of the National Order (Partido da Reedificação da Ordem Nacional, PRONA)—a far-right nationalist party. The merger was performed in order to surpass the electoral threshold of 5%, (Note: The electoral threshold (Cláusula de Barreira) was first passed as a law in 1995 for the 2006 Brazilian general election, but a coalition of smaller parties petitioned the Supreme Federal Court to block it alleging it was inconstitutional. The electoral threshold only started taking place after the 2018 Brazilian general election.) but also as a rebranding as the Liberal Party was heavily implicated in the Mensalão scandal.

Historically, the party was a pragmatic party of business interests, supporting the candidacies of Lula and Dilma from the Workers' Party (PT) for the sake of moderating their presidencies. It generally supported a form of Lulism, which had less economic regulation. As such, the Party of the Republic was considered part of the Centrão. PR's predecessor, the Liberal Party, was heavily involved in the Mensalão—a vote-buying scheme done by the Workers' Party in order to gain support in the National Congress, and Lula's Vice President José Alencar was a member of the old PL.

During the 2010 elections, the Party of the Republic focused on the parliamentary elections; it won 41 of the 513 seats in the Chamber of Deputies and 4 of the 81 Senate seats. One of PR's elected politicians was professional humorist and professional clown Tiririca, who became the State of São Paulo's most voted representative with more than one million votes, and due to Brazil's proportional voting system, Tiririca thus supported PR in electing a sizeable amount of representatives.

Sergio Victor Tamer, founder of the Party of the Republic, was the party's president from 2006 to 2014. Alfredo Nascimento succeeded Tamer as president of the PR until April 2016, when he resigned due to party leadership not supporting the impeachment of Dilma Rousseff. However, 26 of the PR's MPs did vote for her impeachment.

Liberal Party leaders are frequently implicated in corruption cases. Its president, Valdemar Costa Neto, was convicted of corruption and money laundering in the Mensalão scandal. The party's vice president, Carlos "Bispo" Rodrigues, former transport minister Anderson Adauto and former party treasurer Jacinto Lodos, as well as several deputies and councillors, were also charged in the case.

After that move by its MPs, the party took a more rightward turn away from its bipartisan past and supported Geraldo Alckmin's failed campaign in the 2018 Brazilian presidential election.

On 7 May 2019, the Superior Electoral Court (TSE) voted to approve a motion of the party to change its name back to Liberal Party (PL). According to party leadership, the change was done in order to return to the party's roots as body defending economic liberalism, the free market and low intervention of the state in the economy. The social positions of the party remained socially conservative, however. Other specialists point it out as part of a national tendency of parties in Brazil rebranding in order to get better perception from the electorate due a process of loss of trust caused by the Brazilian political crisis, and also riding a wave of pro-liberalism sentiment in Brazil.

The Liberal Party provoked controversy in 2020 by nominating an openly neo-Nazi activist as a municipal candidate in the town of Pomerode. Following the controversy, the candidate was expelled from the party, which claimed to be unaware of the candidate's ideology. The candidacy was subsequently withdrawn.

On 30 November 2021, President of Brazil Jair Bolsonaro and his son Senator Flávio Bolsonaro—who were previously affiliated with the Social Liberal Party (PSL) and left it, attempting to create the Alliance for Brazil party with no avail—joined the PL in preparation for the 2022 Brazilian general election, as presidential candidates must be affiliated with a political party. He had previously considered returning to the Progressists (PP), the Social Christian Party (PSC), Brazilian Labour Party (PTB), as well negotiation with number of other smaller and/or right-wing to far-right parties. Bolsonaro's affiliation to the PL has been pointed out by analysts as a consolidation of an alliance with the Centrão.

In the 2022 general election, the party had formed a presidential ticket and many gubernatorial tickets with a hard right coalition of the Republicans and the Progressists (PP). The election was a great success to the party, resulting in PL becoming the largest bloc in the National Congress of Brazil with 99 seats and the Federal Senate with 13 seats. According to some analysts, the party had been divided between two wide factions: one with traditional Centrão politicians loyal to party president Valdemar Costa Neto, and a Bolsonarist one, composing about two-thirds of the PL's elected bench, with Bolsonaro's followers from the PSL. In an interview, Neto revealed he feared that in case Luiz Inácio Lula da Silva is elected president, there would be a split in the party as the traditional faction might want to align themselves with a possible PT government, while the Bolsonarist branch would form an opposition. Lula was ultimately elected.

In 2026, the Liberal Party emerged as the largest single party in Brazil, electing 29 Senators (an increase of 14) and 121 deputies (an increase of 22). However, the presidential ticket of Flávio Bolsonaro and Alfredo Gaspar was defeated by Lula in the second round.

== Ideology ==
The Liberal Party is a big tent right-wing conservative party. It was formerly described as centre-right, but since Bolsonaro's incorporation the party has moved to the far-right of the political spectrum.

Though previously a party of national liberalism, before its merger with PRONA, the party has increasingly been affiliated with the far-right in Brazil. This has come as a result of the party's joining around the political philosophy of Jair Bolsonaro, who was initially affiliated with the PSL and other socially conservative parties. With the questioning of democracy, foreign policy, and the anti-democratic statements of Bolsonaro, the party seems to have re-embraced some of the tendencies of the head of PRONA Eneas Carneiro, a noted supporter of LaRoucheism, the previous military dictatorship, and a right-wing opposition to neoliberalism.

Generally the party is right-wing populist, economically liberal, but socially anti-liberal and pro-Evangelical, aligning with the ideology of Bolsonaro. The party is pro-agrobusiness, pro-military, and pro-life. The party promotes a generally more economically open form of Brazilian nationalism than Carneiro. In a letter to members in 2021, PL president Valdemar Costa Neto defined the values of freedom, Christian faith, family, and economic liberalism as ideological commitments. He also maintained that the party will act in the interests of agribusiness and the advancement of anti-drug public policies. The party also has defended the right to bear arms and advocates reducing the age of criminal responsibility from 18 to 16 years.

The party has frequently supported Bolsonaro's attacks on the media and the electoral system in Brazil.

== Notable members ==
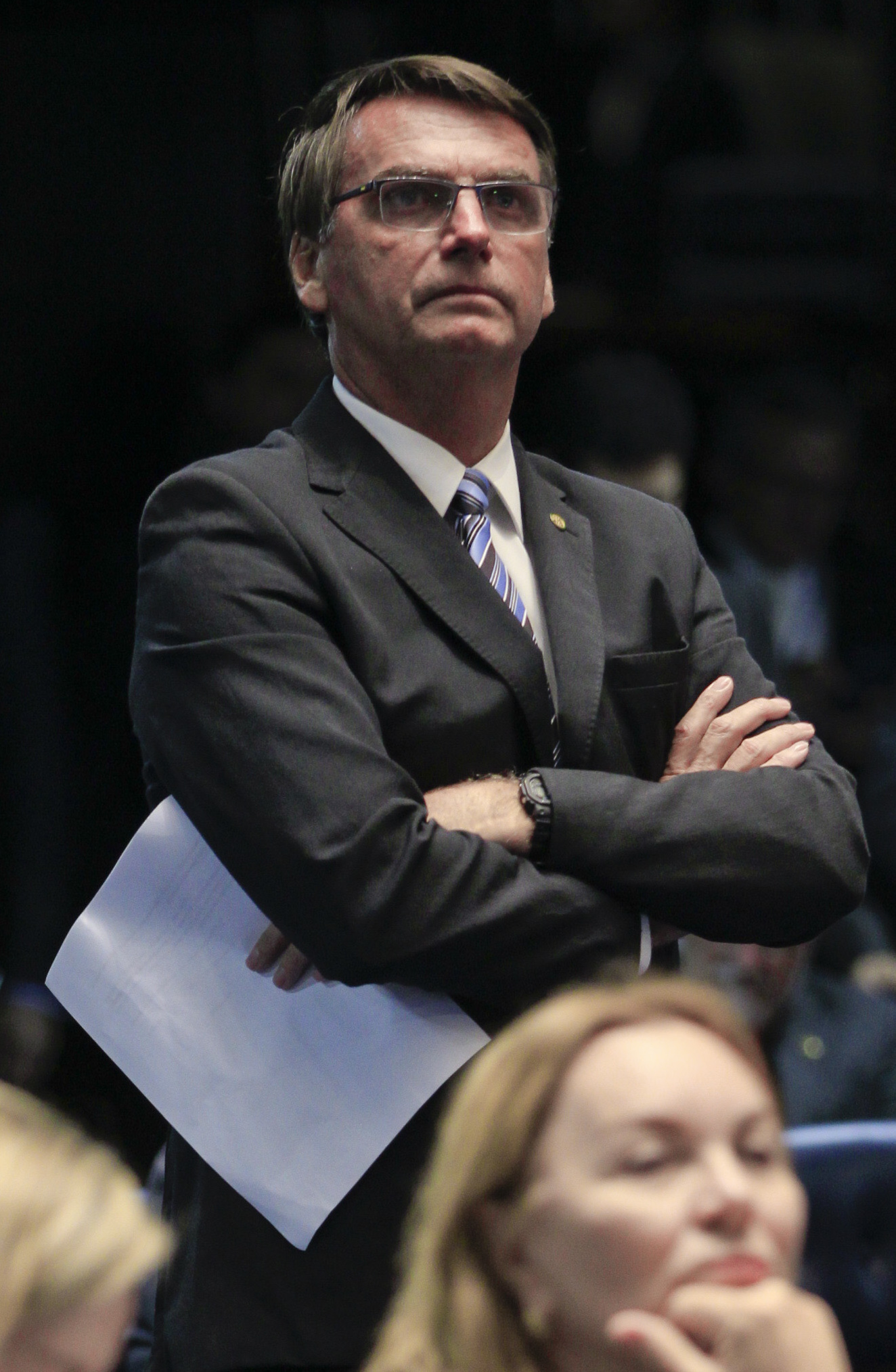
President Jair Bolsonaro visiting the Federal Senate

- Flávio Bolsonaro, entrepreneur, Federal Deputy for Rio de Janeiro from 2003 to 2019, and Senator for Rio de Janeiro since 2019
- Jair Bolsonaro, former army captain, Federal Deputy for Rio de Janeiro from 1991 to 2018, and President of Brazil from 2019 to 2023
- Valdemar Costa Neto, former Federal Deputy for São Paulo from 1991 to 2005 and from 2007 to 2013 and current Party President
- Marco Feliciano, pastor and Federal Deputy for São Paulo since 2011
- Onyx Lorenzoni, veterinarian, cabinet minister, and politician from Rio Grande do Sul
- Romário, football player and Senator for Rio de Janeiro
- Tiririca, comedian, singer-songwriter, and Federal Deputy for São Paulo since 2011, joined PSD in 2025

== Election results ==
=== Presidential elections ===
Year	President	Vice-president	Coalition	Results	
2010	Dilma Rousseff	Michel Temer (Note: PMDB)	For Brazil to Keep on Changing (Note: PT, PMDB, PR, PSB, PDT, PCdoB, PSC, PRB, PTC and PTN)	55,752,529 (56.05%)	Won
2014	Dilma Rousseff	Michel Temer (Note: PMDB)	With the Strength of the People (Note: PT, PMDB, PSD, PP, PR, PROS, PDT, PCdoB and PRB)	54,495,459 (51.64%)	Won
2018	Geraldo Alckmin (Note: PSDB)	Ana Amélia Lemos	To unite Brazil (Note: PSDB, PP, PTB, PSD, PRB, PR, DEM, Solidarity and PPS)	5,096,350 (4.76%)	Lost
2022	Jair Bolsonaro	Walter Braga Netto	For the good of Brazil (Note: PL, Republicans and PP)	58,197,923 (49.1%)	Lost
2026	Flávio Bolsonaro	Alfredo Gaspar	No coalition	59,826,041 (48.21%)	Lost

=== Legislative elections ===
Election	Chamber of Deputies				Federal Senate				Status
Election	Votes	%	Seats	+/–	Votes	%	Seats	+/–	Status
2010	7,311,655	7.57	42 / 513	New	4,649,024	2.73	4 / 81	New	Coalition
2014	5,635,519	5.79	34 / 513	▼8	696,462	0.78	4 / 81	0	Coalition (2015–2016)
2014	5,635,519	5.79	34 / 513	▼8	696,462	0.78	4 / 81	0	Opposition (2016)
2014	5,635,519	5.79	34 / 513	▼8	696,462	0.78	4 / 81	0	Coalition (2016–2018)
2018	5,224,591	5.31	33 / 513	▼1	3,130,082	1.83	2 / 81	▼2	Support
2022	18,228,958	16.54	99 / 513	▲66	25,278,764	24.86	13 / 81	▲11	Opposition
2026	25,824,755	22.69%	121 / 513	▲22	58,307,861	28.11%	29 / 81	▲16	Opposition

== Logos ==
Logo used from 2006 to 2019, when the party was called the Party of the Republic

Logo used from 2019 to 2022

Logo used in 2022

Logo used since 2023

== See also ==
- 2026 Brazilian general election
- List of political parties in Brazil

== Notes ==
Preceded by 21 – BCP (PCB)	Numbers of Brazilian Official Political Parties; 22 – LP (PL)	Succeeded by 23 – Citizenship (Cidadania)
