= Pizzolato =

Pizzolato (pronounced [pittsoˈlaːto]) is an Italian surname from Veneto and from Trapani. Notable people with the surname include:

- Antonino Pizzolato (born 1996), Italian weightlifter
- Fabio Pizzolato (born 1975), Italian pole vaulter
- Gabriella Pizzolato (born 1958), Italian long jumper and heptathlete
- Gavino Pizzolato (1884–1943), Italian general during World War II.
- Henrique Pizzolato (born 1952), Brazilian politician
- Orlando Pizzolato (born 1958), Italian long-distance runner
- Rachel Pizzolato (born 2004), American model and influencer

== See also ==
- Nic Pizzolatto (born 1975), American novelist, screenwriter and producer
- 33187 Pizzolato, a main-belt asteroid
