= Parliamentary Inquiry Commission (Brazil) =

In Brazil, several parliamentary inquiries (CPIs) have been established over the years.

== History ==
In Brazil, the first draft of what would become the future CPI dates back to the time of the Empire, amid the Paraguayan War. The Senate studied the creation of a commission, similar to the current CPIs, to investigate alleged failures of the Brazilian government in the military conflict with the neighboring country. The request was presented in 1867, when the war was two and a half years old, by Senator Silveira da Mota. According to him, the Senate needed to investigate why the combat was consuming so much money from the public coffers and peace was not being achieved. After heated debates at the Palácio do Conde dos Arcos, the headquarters of the imperial Senate in Rio de Janeiro, the senators decided to bury the proposal.

The first constitution to establish the CPI was the 1934 Constitution, but only for the Chamber of Deputies. Only the Chamber could create the CPIs.

The 1937 Constitution, decreed by Getúlio Vargas, was silent regarding the CPIs. They returned in the 1946 Constitution, where they were provided for the first time for both houses of the Legislative Branch: the Chamber of Deputies and the Federal Senate.

In the 1988 Constitution, the CPIs are regulated in Article 58, Paragraph 3: "The parliamentary investigative commissions, which shall have powers of investigation inherent to judicial authorities, in addition to others provided for in the internal regulations of their respective Houses, shall be created by the Chamber of Deputies and by the Federal Senate, jointly or separately, upon request by one-third of their members, for the investigation of a specific fact and for a specified period, and their conclusions, if applicable, shall be forwarded to the Public Prosecutor's Office, for the purpose of promoting civil or criminal liability of the offenders."

== Establishment and operation ==
The request for the establishment of a CPI in Congress can be made by one-third of the Senators or one-third of the Federal Deputies. In the Senate, for example, composed of 81 senators, 27 signatures are required. The Supreme Court has already ruled, in defense of parliamentary minorities, in the Writ of Mandamus No. 26,441 that if there is such a request from 1/3 of the members of the legislative body and the other requirements required by law are met, the majority cannot attempt to obstruct the installation of the CPI by referring the matter to the plenary for judgment.

When a CPI is composed jointly by the Senate and the Chamber of Deputies, it is called a Mixed Parliamentary Inquiry Commission. Even in this case, however, it is commonly referred to by the media and the Brazilian society as CPI, instead of CPM. In this case, in addition to the 27 signatures of the senators, the support of 171 deputies is also required, exactly one-third of the members of the Chamber.

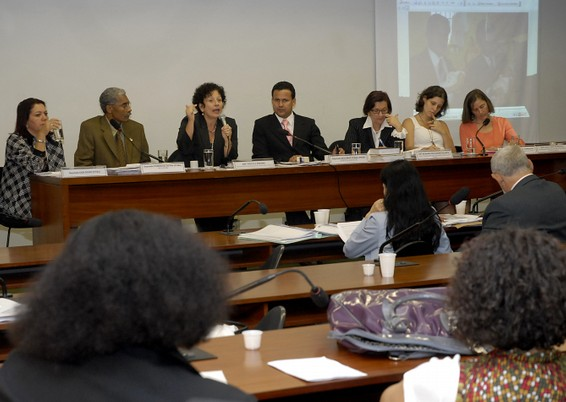
Meeting of the Prison System CPI. Source: Antônio Cruz - Agência Brasil

The Federal Constitution requires that the CPI investigate a specific fact, but there is no obstacle to creating a new CPI or adding to the current one if a new relevant fact that needs to be investigated is identified.

Once the minimum required signatures have been collected, the request for opening the investigation with a description of the facts to be investigated is presented to the board of directors, which reads it in plenary. However, this is not enough for it to function. It is still necessary for the parties that have representation in the House to appoint members to the commission, and only then is its effective installation carried out. The work should last 120 days, which can be extended as many times as necessary within the same .

The non-establishment of the CPI due to the omission of the House board of directors in appointing the members of the CPI infringes on the subjective right of the minorities to see the parliamentary inquiry established, in support of the right of opposition, as already decided by the Supreme Court in the Writ of Mandamus No. 24,831/DF.

After concluding the investigations, the Parliamentary Inquiry Commission may send its findings, if applicable, to the Public Prosecutor's Office, so that it can promote the civil or criminal liability of the accused.

The work schedule of a Parliamentary Inquiry Commission is determined by its members, who will define the investigations and the taking of testimonies. The final report is the exclusive responsibility of the rapporteur, who must be chosen by vote.

== Investigative powers ==
All inquiries, external hearings, and summoning of testimonies must be approved by the plenary of the CPI, in accordance with the principle of collegiality.

To carry out its work, the CPI has the same investigative powers as a judicial authority and, therefore, through a reasoned decision of its plenary, it can:

- Break banking secrecy, fiscal secrecy, data secrecy, and telephone secrecy (not to be confused with wiretapping);
- Request information and confidential documents directly from financial institutions or through the Central Bank or CVM, provided they are previously approved by the Plenary of the Chamber of Deputies, the Senate, or their respective CPIs (Article 4, Paragraph 1, of Law No. 105);
- Hear witnesses, under penalty of coercive measures;
- Hear the investigated or indicted parties.

However, the powers of the CPIs are not identical to those of magistrates, as the latter have some powers guaranteed by the Constitution that are not granted to the Parliamentary Commissions, considering the understanding of the Supreme Federal Court (Writ of Mandamus No. 23,452) that such powers are reserved by the Constitution only for magistrates. Thus, the CPI cannot:

- Determine the unavailability of the assets of the investigated party.
- Order preventive detention (it can only order in flagrante detention);
- Determine the removal from office or public function during the investigation; and
- Order the search and seizure of documents at the residence.

It is a well-established jurisprudence of the Supreme Federal Court that the investigated or accused party has the possibility to remain silent, avoiding self-incrimination (HC 89269). From this guarantee, the following rights arise for the person under investigation, and even for witnesses: a) to remain silent in the face of questions whose answers may imply self-incrimination; b) not to be arrested in flagrante for exercising this constitutional prerogative, on the pretext of committing the crime of disobedience (Article 330 of the Penal Code), nor for perjury (Article 342 of the same Code); and c) not to have silence interpreted against them. (HC 84,214-MC, Rel. Min. Cezar Peluso, monocratic decision, judgment on April 23, 2004, DJ on April 29, 2004)

The investigative powers of the CPI can only be exercised by the members or by a member of the CPI with the prior and express authorization of this commission by majority decision (Article 47 of the Federal Constitution). Without this, the exercise of any of these powers – by any member, even by the president or the rapporteur of the CPI – is arbitrary and can be challenged or rectified through legal action, including constitutional remedies, especially habeas corpus and writ of mandamus.

== List ==
- PC Farias CPI (1992), which investigated corruption allegations involving President Fernando Collor, and ended with his resignation (before the Senate decided on impeachment).
- Budget CPI (1993), which became famous for revealing the scheme of the so-called "budget dwarves" (a group of lawmakers who controlled the budget and were accused of massive corruption. The name "dwarves" refers to the size of the party of the lawmakers, considered "dwarves" compared to the size of other parties).
- Narcotrafficking CPI (1999) and cargo theft.
- Judicial CPI (1999), investigation of concrete allegations of irregularities committed by members of superior courts, regional courts, and courts of justice.
- Mixed Parliamentary Inquiry Commission of the Mensalão scandal (2005), investigating the vote-buying of lawmakers in the National Congress to approve government projects.
- Correios CPI (2005), investigation of corruption in the state-owned company, which led to the Mensalão scandal.
- Bingo CPI (2005), investigation of the use of bingo halls for money laundering and their connection to organized crime. Part of the investigations related to the Mensalão scandal.
- Air Traffic Blackout CPI (2007), investigation of allegations of irregularities in the Brazilian air traffic system.
- Pension Funds CPI (2015), investigation of a shortfall of BRL 46 billion in the funds of the Post Office (Postalis), Petrobras (Petros), Caixa Econômica Federal (Funcef), and Banco do Brasil (Previ).
- BNDES CPI (2015), investigation of allegations of losses in financing by the National Bank for Economic and Social Development (BNDES).
- Petrobras CPI (2015), investigation of allegations of embezzlement of resources from Petrobras by the PP, PT, and PMDB through former directors of the state-owned company Paulo Roberto Costa, Renato Duque, Nestor Cerveró, and Jorge Zelada, along with operators Alberto Youssef, João Vaccari Neto, and Fernando Soares (known as Fernando Baiano), businessmen, and contractors. Considered by the Federal Public Prosecutor's Office, Federal Police, and ministers of the Supreme Federal Court as the biggest scandal in the country's history, with identified payments exceeding BRL 6 billion in bribes.
- Fake News CPI (2019) Investigation of the existence of a network for the production and dissemination of fake news and virtual harassment on social media.
- COVID-19 CPI (2021) Investigation into irregularities in the COVID-19 pandemic in Brazil at the federal level.
