= José Janene =

Brazilian politician

José Mohamed Janene
- Born: September 12, 1955; Santo Inácio, Brazil
- Died: September 14, 2010 (aged 55); São Paulo, Brazil
- Occupation(s): businessman, cowman, politician

José Mohamed Janene (Santo Inácio, September 12, 1955 – São Paulo, September 14, 2010) was a Brazilian businessman, cowman and politician. He had many farms and ran many companies, mostly in Londrina, where he lived. He became notable via politics and by being involved in the Mensalão scandal. He was the first and only Muslim to ever be elected to the Brazilian national congress.

== Involvement in Mensalão ==
At the time of the Mensalão scandal, Janene was the Progressive Party leader in the Chamber of Deputies and was accused of having received R$ 4.1 million from the scheme operated by advertiser Marcos Valério. Among the 19 congressmen involved in the scheme named "valerioduto", Janene was the last one to be tried by the Chamber. Although the lawsuit was initiated on October 17, 2005, the Ethics committee of the Chamber delayed for over 13 months voting on the report that recommended the revocation of Janene's mandate. From September 2005, when he left the Chamber in on sick leave, Janene succeeded in postponing the lawsuit many times by claiming health issues. He also asked for retirement before the vote on the revocation of his mandate but the request was rejected by the Chamber's direction board. On December 6, 2006, the licensed congressman was found not guilty in a Chamber session with very few voters. In a secret ballot, 210 congressmen voted to revoke his mandate, 128 voted against the revocation, 5 voted blank ballots and 23 refused to vote. A minimum of 257 votes for revocation was necessary to revoke Janene's mandate, so Janene escaped condemnation.

== Land reform issue ==
On September 15, 2006, one of his farms, known as "3 Jota", located in Guaravera district, Londrina, was invaded by members of Landless Workers' Movement. The invaders said that the property had been bought with money from political corruption and should be included in agrarian reform.

== Illness and death ==
On December 31, 2006, the Brazilian newspaper of record published the Chamber's decision to allocate Janene a 12.8 thousand real retirement pension due to his health problems.

In 2009, new accusations of money laundering stunned José Janene even more, worsening his cardiopathy. Investigation of Janene resumed. Because of the worsening of his health condition, due to a stroke, besides the promulgation of "Ficha Limpa Law", Janene was forced to quit his political career and began to act behind the scenes. He planned to return to politics but had a second stroke in February 2010. Janene waited three months for a heart transplantation but it never happened. He died on September 14, 2010, in INCOR Hospital, in São Paulo, due to septic shock. His body was buried in the Muslim cemetery in Londrina.
