= Liberalism in Brazil =

Overview of liberalism in Brazil

Liberalism in Brazil began around 1831, initially emerging as the opposition to conservatism. However, with the republican revolution of 1889, organized liberalism faded away. Liberal parties were established in the twentieth century and from 1966 onwards, the Democratic Movement became liberalism's primary representative. As multi-partyism was established, more parties began to adopt the label of "liberal", although the term was often used by moderate conservative factions.

Three parties in Brazil identify themselves as liberal, but the Liberal Front Party (Partido da Frente Liberal) is conservative and a member of the International Democrat Union. The right-leaning Liberal Party (Partido Liberal) could be classified as a conservative-liberal party. The centrist Brazilian Democratic Movement (Movimento Democrático Brasileiro) occupies a liberal position on the political spectrum.

== Left-wing liberalism ==
Left-wing liberal movements in Brazil include some centrist parties and organizations rooted in socialism in the past, including Cidadania and Livres.

== The timeline ==
=== Liberal Party (1831) ===
- 1831: In resistance to the imperial regime, liberals formed the Liberal Party (Partido Liberal) in 1831, loosely connected to the urban petty bourgeoisie. It became the leading progressive party during the monarchy.
- 1863: A left wing faction formed the Progressive Party.
- 1868: The Progressive Party reunited with the party.
- 1869: A left wing faction formed the New Liberal Party.
- 1882: A new Progressive Party is formed.
- 1889: After the fall of the monarchy, the party vanished.

=== Progressive Party (1863) ===
- 1863: A left wing faction of the Liberal Party formed the Progressive Party (Partido Progressista).
- 1868: The party reunited with the Liberal Party.

=== New Liberal Party ===
- 1869: A left wing faction of the Liberal Party formed the New Liberal Party, led by Joaquím Nabuco.

=== Progressive Party (1882) ===
- 1882: A left wing faction of the Liberal Party formed the Progressive Party (Partido Progressista).
- 1889: After the fall of the monarchy, the party disappeared.

=== Republican Party ===
- 1870: The Republican Party (Partido Republicano), a party of the urban middle class, was formed.
- 1889: After the fall of the monarchy, the party disappeared.

=== Liberal Alliance ===
- 1930: The liberal bourgeoisie formed the Liberal Alliance (Aliança Liberal), led by Getúlio Vargas. After he lost the 1930 election, the party came to power in a revolution.
- 1934: When Vargas established an authoritarian regime in 1934, the party fell apart.

=== Brazilian Democratic Movement ===
- 1966: The military government allowed the formation of a democratic opposition party in a bi-partisan system, the Brazilian Democratic Movement (Movimento Democrático Brasileiro). Liberals were united with social democrats, socialists and right-leaning opponents of the rightist military government. The party was led by Oscar Passos, Pedroso Horta (since 1970) and Ulysses Guimarães.
- 1979: The party was reorganized into the Brazilian Democratic Movement Party (Partido do Movimento Democrático Brasileiro, PMDB).
- 1981: The Popular Party merged into the PMDB.
- 1988: The Brazilian Social Democracy Party seceded from the Brazilian Democratic Movement.

=== Popular Party ===
- 1980: A liberal faction of the National Renewal Alliance established the liberal Popular Party (Partido Popular), led by Tancredo de Almeida Neves.
- 1981: The Popular Party merged into the Brazilian Democratic Movement.

=== Liberal Front Party ===
- 1985: The center-right Liberal Front Party (Partido da Frente Liberal) was formed by a secession from the Democratic Social Party.
- 2007: PFL changed its name to the Democrats (Democratas).

=== Liberal Party (1985) ===
- 1985: The center-right Liberal Party (Partido Liberal) was formed.

=== Libertarians ===
- 2005: The Libertarians (Libertários) party was formed as a libertarian party with some classic liberal members. The Libertarians have no electoral register and cannot participate in elections.

=== New Party ===
- 2011: The New Party (Partido Novo) was formed.

=== MBL ===
- 2014: The Free Brazil Movement (Movimento Brasil Livre) was founded.

=== Livres ===
- 2016: The Free movement (Livres) was founded.

== Liberal leaders ==
- Joaquim Nabuco
- Tancredo Neves
- Ulysses Guimarães
- Rui Barbosa
- Roberto Campos

== See also ==
- History of Brazil
- Politics of Brazil
- List of political parties in Brazil
- Lulism
