= Alberto Youssef =

Brazilian black-market banker (born 1967)

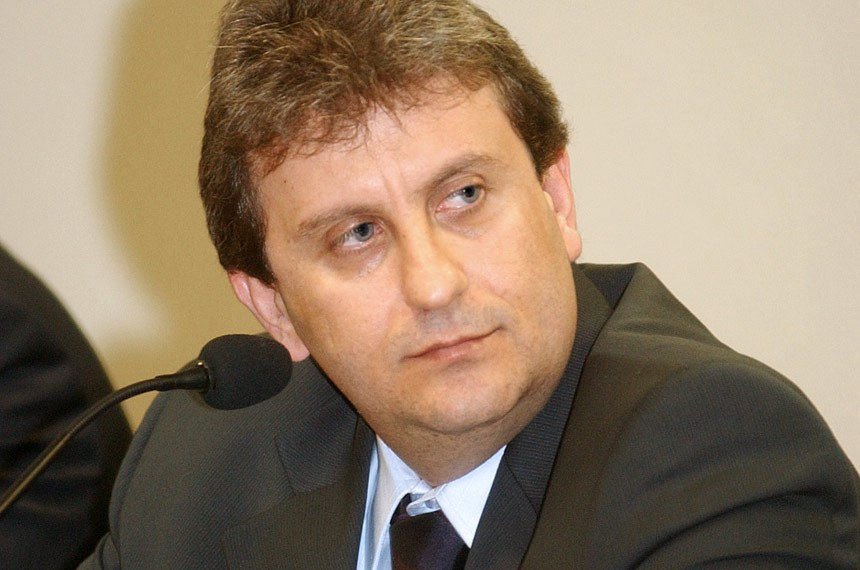
- Youssef testifies before the Petrobras Inquiry Committee in the Federal Senate
- Born: 6 October 1967 (age 59); Londrina, Paraná, Brazil
- Occupation: Black-market banker
- Known for: Operation Car Wash
- Status: On parole
- Criminal charge: Money laundry
- Penalty: 3 years in closed regime

Alberto Youssef (Portuguese pronunciation: [awˈbɛʁ.tu jo(w)ˈsɛf]; born 6 October 1967) is a Brazilian black-market banker. He has been implicated in several of Brazil's largest scandals during the past generation. He was a figure in the Banestado scandal, and later was a major target of Operation Car Wash, the official investigation of corruption surrounding Petrobras, the government-controlled oil company.

Bloomberg described Youssef in January 2015 as “Brazil's black-market central banker, a career criminal who smuggled cash for the rich and powerful”. In August 2015, The New York Times called him “a convicted money launderer and former bon vivant.”

Youssef was arrested in March 2014 for violating the terms of a plea-bargaining agreement. He is currently incarcerated.

== Early life and activities ==
Youssef is the son of Kalim Youssef, a Lebanese immigrant, and Antoinette Youssef, a Brazilian. He grew up in very modest circumstances in Londrina, a town in the state of Paraná.

When he was a boy, he sold snacks in the streets of Londrina. During his teenage years, after earning a pilot's license, he began smuggling costly electronic items and other merchandise into Brazil from Paraguay, where taxes were far lower, and selling them on. His older sister worked with him on this smuggling operation, which first put Youssef on the government's radar, in the 1980s. Also during his teens, he helped his mother sell food at a shop at the local airport.

It was at the airport that he met José Janene, a businessman and pilot who would later become a member of Congress and helped Youssef with his career.

== Career ==
=== Early activities and scandals ===
By the early 1990s, Youssef had left smuggling behind and gone into the business of money laundering. Soon he was considered one of the top doleiros, or black-market currency changers, in Brazil. According to Bloomberg, Youssef began driving an armored car to deliver cash amounts daily.

Youssef was arrested both in 2000, and again in 2001, because of a corrupt operation that was based in Londrina and that involved the bribery of bank employees who in return cashed municipal checks, including unsigned checks. He was never put on trial, however, and spent less than a month behind bars.

Youssef was also involved with a case of embezzlement in Maringá, a town near Londrina around the same time as his other arrests. Indicted on charges of criminal conspiracy, he escaped punishment by snitching on local government officials who had been involved in the scandal.

=== Banestado scandal ===
Youssef was then charged with money laundering in the Banestado scandal. Banestado was a state-run bank that had been used by many wealthy persons to launder money and thus avoid high Brazilian taxes. Youssef was in charge of the money laundering, and was said to have laundered more than $830 million.

Once again, Youssef plea-bargained, turning in other doleiros, whose conviction and imprisonment only enhanced Youssef's standing in his profession.

=== Further activities and scandals ===
In yet another investigation, Youssef got off by telling prosecutors about the manipulation of tax credits at a government power utility.

In 2006, Janene was indicted in a scandal involving members of congress who sold their votes. Prosecutors later determined that some of the money generated by this scheme was laundered by Youssef through a Brasília gas station. After Janene's death in 2010, Youssef took control of Janene's network of corruption in both Brasília and Petrobras.

=== Petrobras scandal ===
Youssef has been called a "principal player" in the largest scandal in Brazilian history. It involves money laundering and other corrupt activities at the government-owned oil company, Petrobras, executives of which accepted bribes in return for overpaying construction firms doing work for the firm. Youssef became part of the operation in late 2006 at the invitation of Janene; it was his job to collect the bribes from the contractors.

The scandal has been under investigation since March 2014. The investigators' big break came with the discovery of an e-mail by Youssef in which he discussed a Range Rover bought for Paulo Roberto Costa, who had been Petrobras's supplies director from 2004 to 2012. As he had in many other scandals, Youssef agreed to turn state’s evidence. When he handed his lawyers a piece of paper on which he had written the names of the participants in the Petrobras operation, Reinaldet asked, “Are you serious?” Reinaldet later told the Times, "It was kind of like, in Brazil, we know that corruption is a monster. But we never really see the monster. This was like seeing the monster."

Youssef told prosecutors that President Dilma Rousseff, who had served as chairwoman of Petrobras from 2003 through 2010, was aware of the kickback scheme. One investigator said that Youssef's revelations made it clear “we had a case that was 100 times bigger” than they had originally imagined.

Because of his agreement with prosecutors, Youssef, who would ordinally have received a prison sentence of over 8 years, will instead serve only three years for his involvement in Petrobras.

== Imprisonment ==
Youssef was arrested in March 2014, and in September he was sentenced to four years and four months for having violated the terms of a plea bargain regarding the Banestado case. He is now in Curitiba.

== Personal life ==
Youssef is married to Joan of Arc Fernandes da Silva Youssef, who separated from him after learning of his extramarital affairs. His mistresses have included Nelma Kodama, a convicted criminal who is now in prison, and Taiana Camargo, a fashion model.

In Londrina, he was known as an extravagant spender on parties and women.
