= INSS fraud scheme =

2020s fraud scandal in Brazil

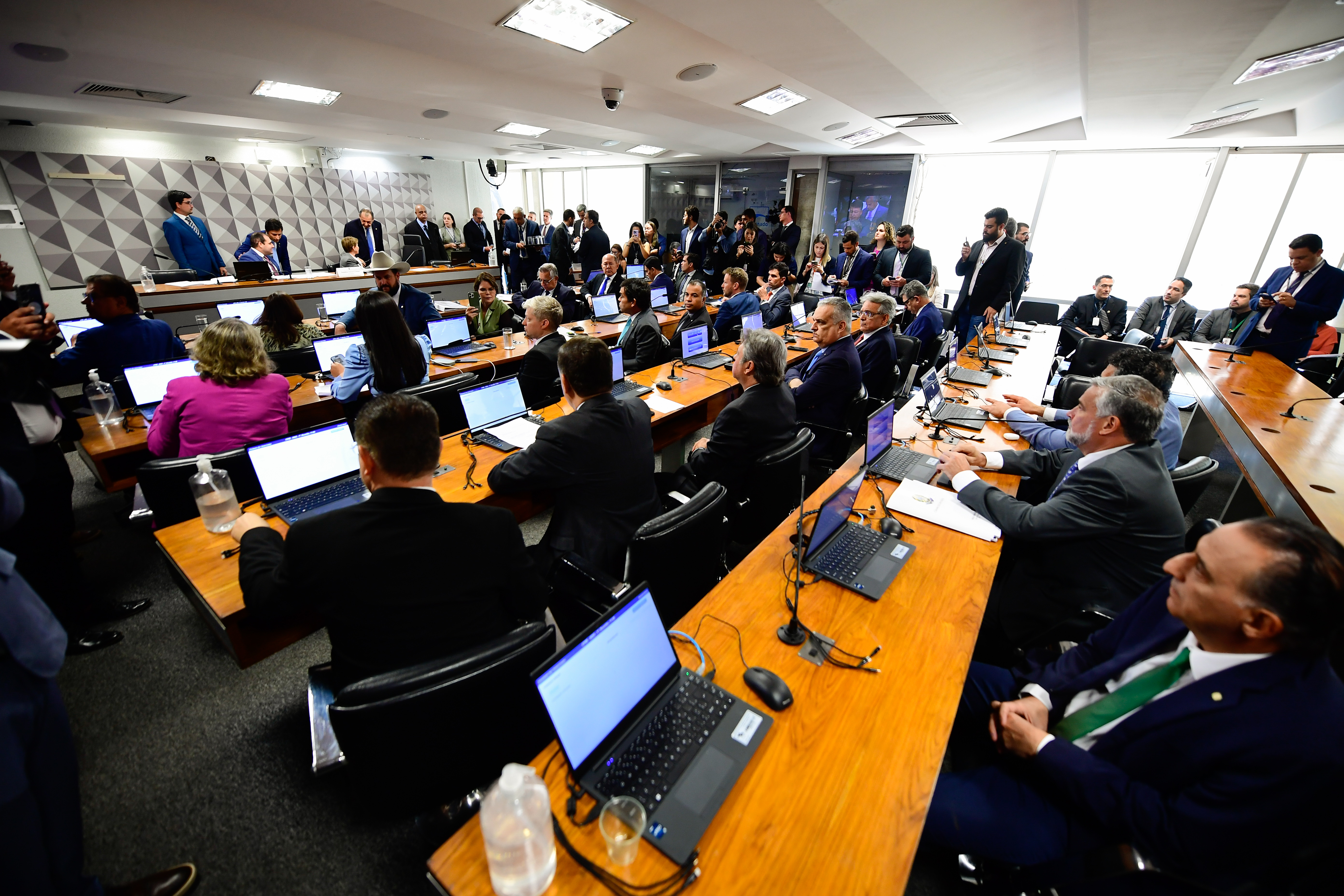
- Joint Parliamentary Inquiry Committee on the INSS - 2025
- Operation codename: Operation No Discount
- Type: Embezzlement; Money laundering

Participants
- Initiated by: Federal Police of Brazil; Comptroller General of the Union
- Executed by: Lead prosecutor (PGR): Paulo Gonet; (Jun 2025 – present); Primary judge (STF): Dias Toffoli; (Jun – Ago 2025); André Mendonça; (Ago 2025 – present)

Mission
- Target: INSS officials; Union leaders (Conafer and other entities); Dataprev staff; federal deputies and other public officials allegedly linked to the scheme
- Objective: Investigate an illegal-deduction scheme against INSS retirees and pensioners' benefits, embezzlement, document forgery, organized crime, and money laundering

Timeline
- Date begin: 23 April 2025 (ongoing)

Results
- Suspects: 48
- Arrests: 27

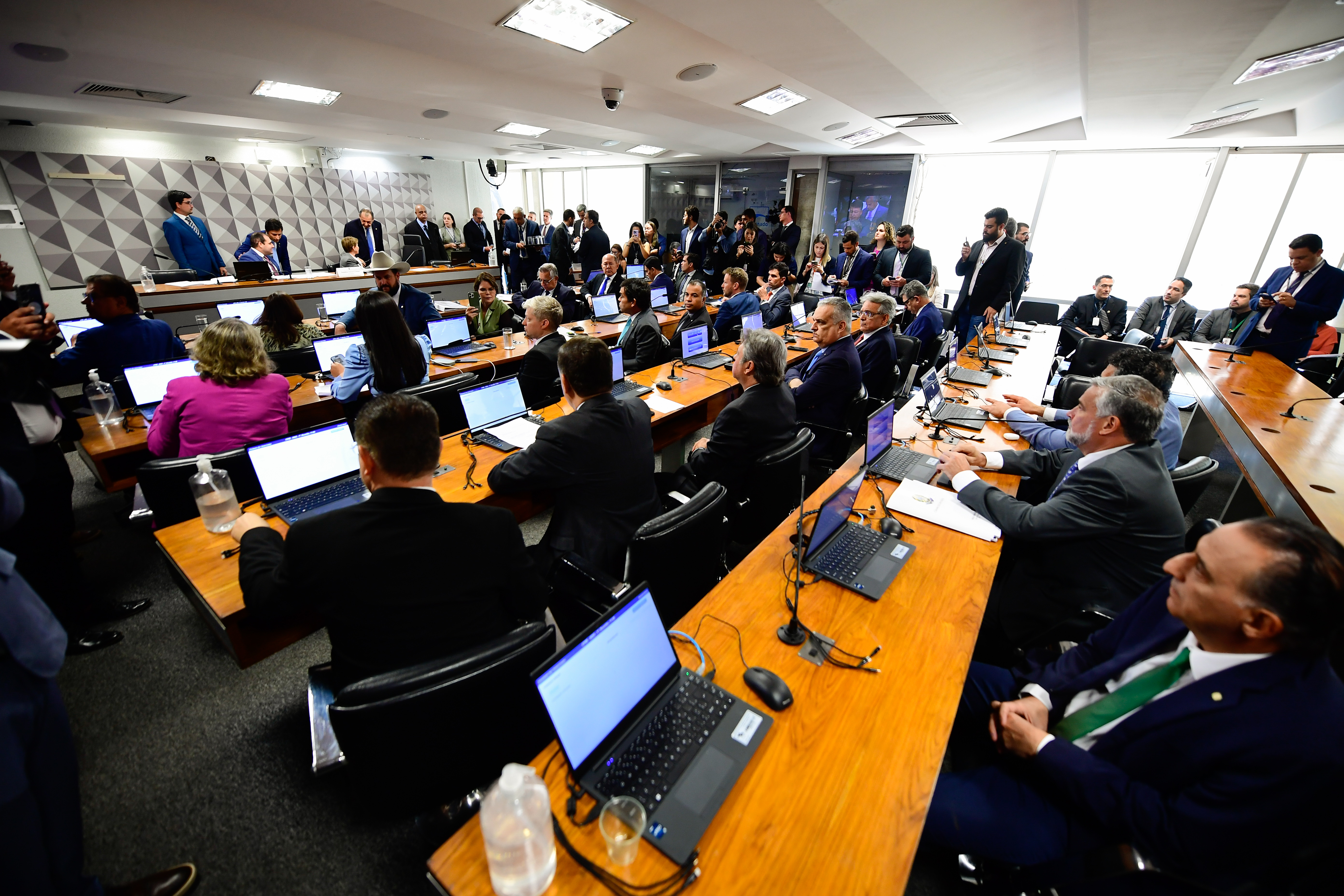
Session of the Joint Parliamentary Inquiry Commission on the INSS scandal at the Federal Senate on August 20, 2025.

The INSS fraud scheme, also known as the "INSS Scam" or "Aposentão", refers to a criminal scheme that diverted and laundered funds from beneficiaries of the National Social Security Institute (INSS) through irregular deductions by associations and unions, without authorization, from retirees' and pensioners' benefits, as investigated by Operation No Discount. The scheme, investigated by the Federal Police and the Comptroller General of the Union, is estimated to have caused losses of R$6.3 billion during the period spanning the Bolsonaro and Lula administrations. According to the Federal Police, the scheme began in 2019, during the government of Jair Bolsonaro, who had received warnings about the frauds, and continued until 2024, with 64% of this amount referring to 2023 and 2024, during the Lula administration. However, it is estimated that the scheme may have started earlier, and in August 2025, the Joint Parliamentary Inquiry Commission approved investigations starting from 2015, during the Dilma administration. The INSS estimates that 4.1 million beneficiaries may have been affected. The operators of the scheme were Maurício Camisotti and Antônio Carlos Camilo Antunes, the "Bald Guy of the INSS".

The scheme was revealed with the launch of the police operation "No Discount" in April 2025, which carried out 211 search and seizure warrants across 13 states and the Federal District. Among the measures taken, the then-president of the INSS, Alessandro Stefanutto, was removed from his position, and six arrest warrants were issued, resulting in three detentions. The Federal Police recovered approximately one billion reais in assets and valuables. Initial estimates from the Federal Police indicate that 11 entities are formally implicated in the scheme, but there are suspicions of involvement by more than 20 similar organizations. The National Confederation of Agricultural Workers (CONTAG) was the entity that diverted the most funds, with a suspected amount of two billion reais. In total, six civil servants were removed from their positions. The scandal led to the downfall of the then-Minister of Social Security, Carlos Lupi of the Democratic Labour Party (PDT), who admitted to having been alerted about irregularities but denied direct responsibility. Prior to this, the newspaper Metrópoles published a series of reports on the "INSS Scam" starting in December 2023.

In August 2025, a Joint Parliamentary Inquiry Commission (CPMI) was established to investigate the scandal, at the joint request of Damares Alves and Coronel Fernanda. In September, it was revealed that in 2018, during the government transition, former President Jair Bolsonaro had received information about "diversions, frauds, and irregularities with public funds within the INSS" from the National Association of Social Security Medical Experts, and that in 2019, his administration had received an official letter from the São Paulo Secretariat of Justice issued on August 1 of that year; the document reveals that Sérgio Moro, then Minister of Justice and Public Security; Luciano Timm, then National Secretary of Consumer Affairs; and Renato Vieira, then President of the INSS, received complaints of irregular deductions from retirement benefits through Fernando Capez, former executive director of São Paulo Consumer Protection and Defense Program. Months before these complaints reached Moro's office, they had already passed through the office of then-Minister of the Economy Paulo Guedes, on February 25, 2019. To date, the Federal Police have arrested Antônio Carlos Camilo Antunes and businessman Maurício Camisotti. Subsequently, in November 2025, the Federal Police arrested former president of the autarchy Alessandro Stefanutto, and former INSS prosecutor Virgílio Antônio Ribeiro de Oliveira Filho.

A survey conducted by CNN Brasil showed that the INSS downplayed complaints and grievances filed by retirees through the Access to Information Law regarding improper deductions from benefits, providing evasive responses claiming that the deductions were provided for by law. Among the reasons cited for the increase in deductions are the relaxation of rules, driven by lobbying in the National Congress, failures in INSS oversight and control, and political appointments to the agency—which was confirmed by the minutes of a meeting between the Comptroller General of the Union and INSS leadership on August 9, 2024, revealing that a monumental scheme was on the verge of being exposed and that the agency's leadership had failed to act. Furthermore, in an interview with Folha de S.Paulo in June 2025, the president of Dataprev, Rodrigo Assumpção, confirmed that the agency chose to maintain a vulnerable system for six months even though a more secure one was available, and it was only discontinued after Operation No Discount. In July, the Lula administration initiated reimbursements for individuals who suffered improper deductions between March 2020 and March 2025. In February 2026, two former high-ranking INSS employees entered into plea bargain agreements and mentioned Fábio Luís Lula da Silva, son of Brazilian President Luiz Inácio Lula da Silva, in connection with the scheme. On the 26th of the same month, the INSS CPMI approved the breach of Fábio Luís's (Lulinha) banking secrecy in a tumultuous session. Prior to that, the case's rapporteur, Justice André Mendonça, authorized the Federal Police to breach Lulinha's secrecy due to his alleged involvement in the scheme. Former minister Carlos Lupi was also implicated in the scheme through the plea bargain. In March 2026, in a new phase of the operation, Federal Deputy Maria Gorete Pereira became a target and was ordered to wear an electronic ankle monitor; lawyer Cecília Rodrigues Mota and businessman Natjo de Lima Pinheiro were arrested in the operation. In May 2026, the Federal Police changed the coordination of the operation's inquiries during the plea bargain of businessman Maurício Camisotti.

== See also ==
- Corruption in Brazil
- Banco Master scandal
- National Social Security Institute
