= Valdemar Costa Neto =

Brazilian politician (born 1949)

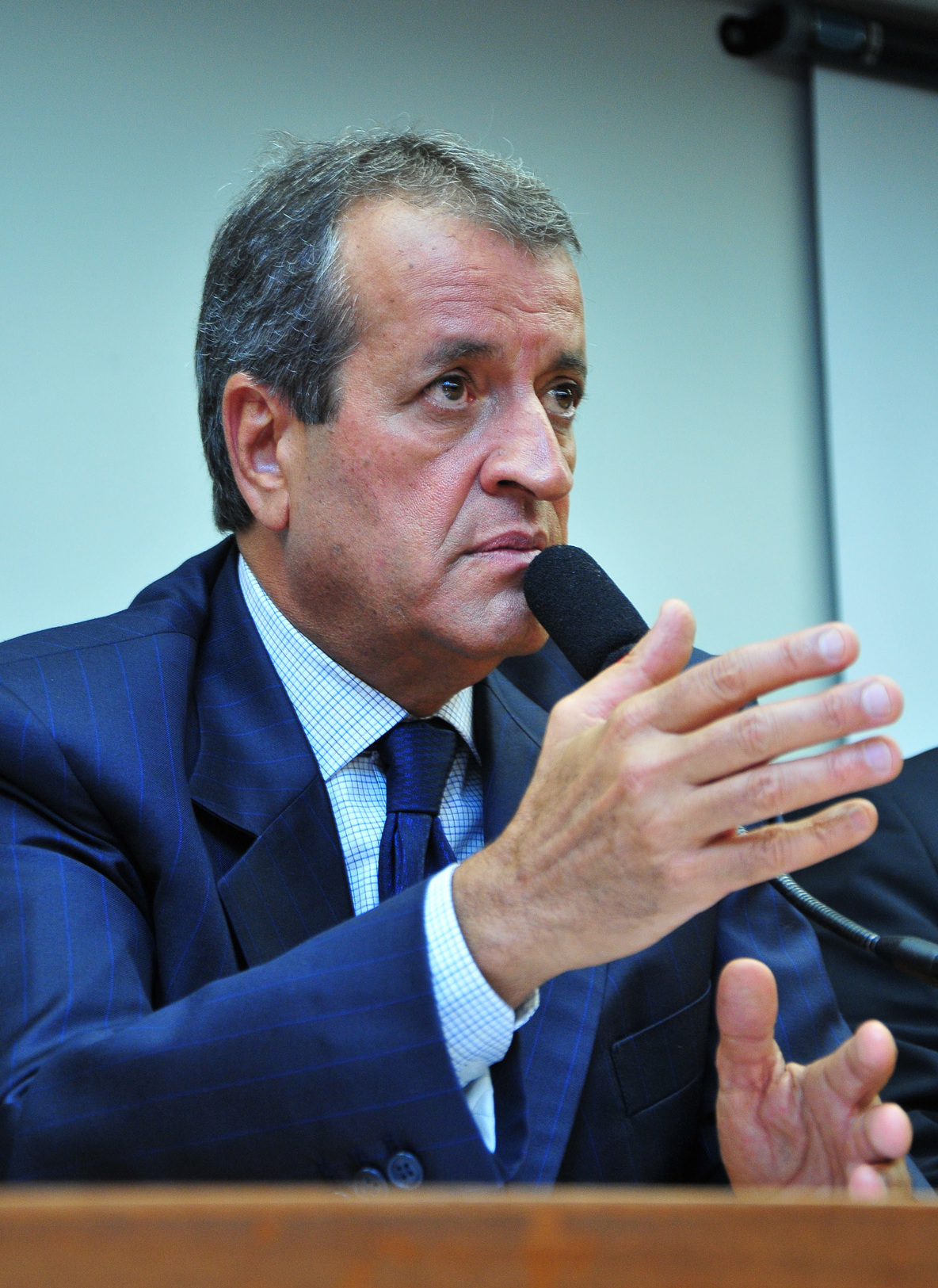

President of the Liberal Party (Note: The current Liberal Party was founded in 2006, as the Party of the Republic, through the merger of the 1985 Liberal Party and the Party of the Reconstruction of the National Order (PRONA).)
- Incumbent
- Assumed office 28 November 2020
- Preceded by: José Tadeu Candelária

President of the Liberal Party
- In office 10 January 2000 – 26 October 2006
- Preceded by: Álvaro Valle
- Succeeded by: Position abolished

Member of the Chamber of Deputies
- In office 1 February 2007 – 5 December 2013 (Note: Resigned after an arrest warrant was issued on corruption charges.)
- Constituency: São Paulo
- In office 1 February 1991 – 1 August 2005 (Note: Resigned during the Mensalão scandal.)
- Constituency: São Paulo

Personal details
- Born: 11 August 1949 (age 77) São Paulo, Brazil
- Party: PL (since 2006)
- Other political affiliations: ARENA (1979); PDS (1979–1984); PL (1985–2006)
- Criminal information
- Known for: Mensalão scandal
- Status: Released
- Convictions: Passive corruption; Money laundering
- Penalty: 7 years and 10 months

Valdemar Costa Neto (born 11 August 1949) is a Brazilian politician. He is a congressman and president of the Liberal Party (PL), the party of former President of Brazil Jair Bolsonaro.

In 2012, he was charged with corruption and money laundering. He was arrested in the same year, but in 2016 he received a pardon by the Supreme Federal Court (STF). Valdemar was detained on 8 February 2024 by the Federal Police (PF) for possession of a firearm.
