= Liberal Party (Brazil, 1985) =

Liberal Party Partido Liberal
- Abbreviation: PL
- President: Valdemar Costa Neto
- Founder: Álvaro Valle
- Founded: June 25, 1985
- Dissolved: October 2006
- Merged into: Party of the Republic
- Headquarters: SCN-Qd. 2, Bl. D Sala 601, Edifício Liberty Mall Asa Norte, Brasília
- Ideology: Liberalism (Brazilian); Social-liberalism
- Political position: Centre-right
- Colours: Scarlett Red; Liberal Blue
- TSE Identification Number: 22

The Liberal Party (Portuguese: Partido Liberal, PL) was a centre-right political party of Brazil, active from 1985 to 2006. The Pentecostal Universal Church of the Kingdom of God heavily influenced the party after 1999. In the 2002 election, José Alencar of the PL was elected vice president as the running mate of Luiz Inácio Lula da Silva. At the legislative elections on 6 October 2002, the party won 26 out of 513 seats in the Chamber of Deputies and three out of 81 seats in the Senate of Brazil and supported Luiz Inácio Lula da Silva's government. Some of its members were investigated following corruption allegations and suspected involvement in the so-called "Mensalão scandal". The Universal Church-led faction then left the PL to create a new party named Brazilian Republican Party (PRB) in 2005.

At the last elections the party contested, in October 2006, it won 23 seats in the Chamber of Deputies and one seat in the Senate for a total of three senate seats. The party did not run candidates in presidential or gubernatorial elections.

On 21 December 2006, the Liberal Party merged with the Party of the Reconstruction of the National Order (Partido da Reedificação da Ordem Nacional, PRONA) to create the Party of the Republic (Partido da Republica, PR). In 2019, the Party of the Republic renamed itself to the Liberal Party.
