= José Borba =

Brazilian politician (1949–2026)

Member of the Chamber of Deputies of Brazil for Paraná
- In office 1 February 1995 – 17 October 2005

Personal details
- Born: José Rodrigues Borba; 14 July 1949 Mandaguari, Paraná, Brazil
- Died: 3 February 2026 (aged 76) Jandaia do Sul, Paraná, Brazil
- Party: PTB (1993–1999); PMDB (1999–2007)
- Occupation: Businessman

José Rodrigues Borba (14 July 1949 – 3 February 2026) was a Brazilian politician. A member of the Brazilian Labour Party and the Brazilian Democratic Movement Party, he served in the Chamber of Deputies from 1995 to 2005.

Borba died in Jandaia do Sul on 3 February 2026, at the age of 76.
