= Santo Inácio =

Coordinates: 22°41′52″S 51°47′38″W

- Municipality
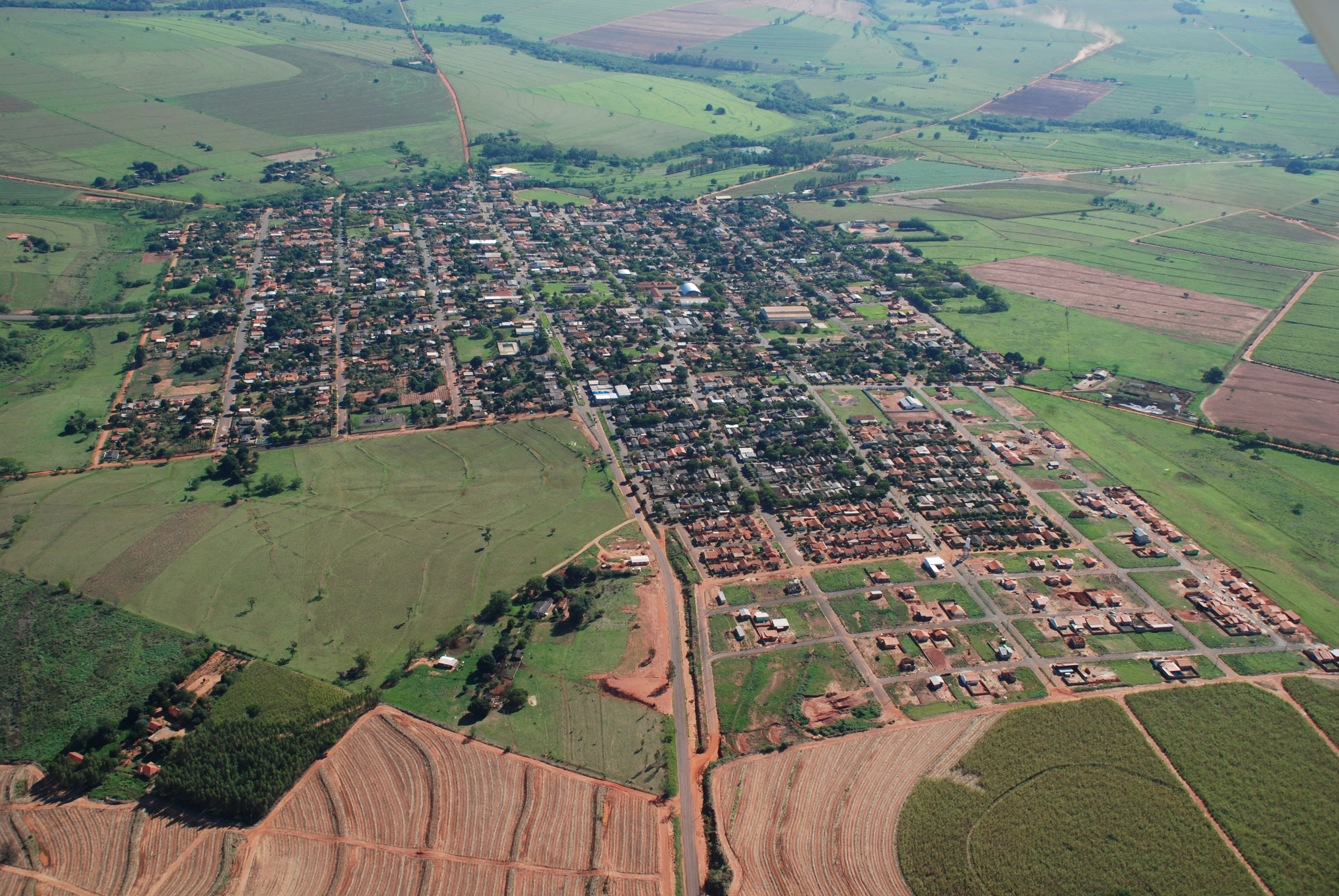
- View of Santo Inácio
- Interactive map of Santo Inácio
- Country: Brazil
- Region: Southern
- State: Paraná
- Mesoregion: Noroeste Paranaense

Population (2020)
  - Total: 5,416
- Time zone: UTC−3 (BRT)

Santo Inácio is a municipality in the state of Paraná in the Southern Region of Brazil.

== See also ==
- List of municipalities in Paraná
