= IRB(Re) =

Brazilian reinsurance company

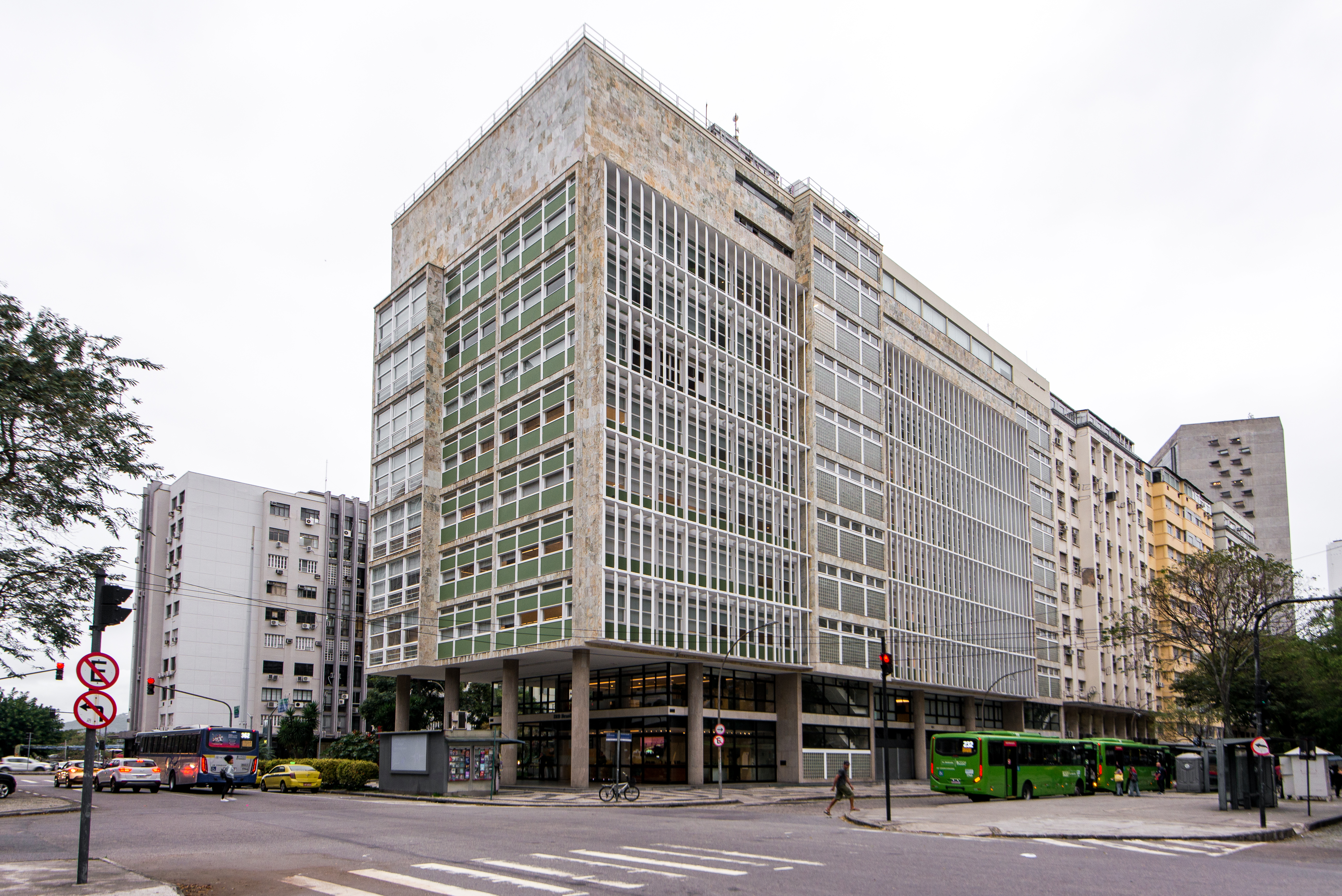
- IRB building in Rio de Janeiro.
- Native name: Instituto de Resseguros do Brasil
- Formerly: Reinsurance Institute of Brazil
- Type: Public Company
- Industry: Reinsurance
- Founded: 1939
- Founder: Getúlio Vargas
- Headquarters: Rio de Janeiro, Brazil
- Key people: Marcos Falcão (CEO)
- Website: irbre.com

IRB(Re), formally registered as IRB-Brasil Resseguros S.A., is the largest reinsurance company in Brazil. Founded as a state-owned enterprise, the company was the sole provider of reinsurance in the country for nearly seven decades until the market was opened to private and foreign competition.

== History ==
=== Creation and monopoly ===
The company was created on April 3, 1939, by then-president Getúlio Vargas through Decree-Law No. 1,186, originally named Instituto de Resseguros do Brasil [Reinsurance Institute of Brazil].

For almost 70 years, IRB held a legal and absolute state monopoly over the Brazilian reinsurance market. The legal framework of the monopoly was formally ended by Constitutional Amendment No. 13 in 1996, though the effective opening of the market to private and international reinsurers only occurred later with the promulgation of Complementary Law No. 126 in 2007. IRB was classified as a local reinsurer.

Despite the opening of the market, the company remained as a dominant entity in Brazilian reinsurance sector.

Since October 2013, IRB Brasil RE operates as a private company. In addition to the Brazilian Federal Government, the controlling shareholders are BB Seguros Participações S.A., Bradesco Auto Re Companhia de Seguros, Itaú Seguros S.A., Itaú Vida e Previdência S.A. and the Investment Fund on Participations Caixa Barcelona. Together, these controlling shareholders have over 90% of the company's total capital stock.

According to Standard & Poor's in 2005, the IRB was the 64th reinsurance company in the world in volume of awards, with a net revenue of 525.9 million U.S. dollars, and a retrocession of 47.7%.

=== Privatization and IPO ===
In 2017, the company launched its initial public offering (IPO) on the B3. In 2019, the Brazilian government sold its remaining stakes in the company.

=== 2020 accounting scandal ===
In early 2020, an independent asset management firm Squadra Investimentos published a report detailing significant inconsistencies in IRB's financial statements, indicating that the company's reported accounting profits had been artificially inflated.

With a sharp drop in its stock price taking place, rumours circulated, falsely claiming that Berkshire Hathaway had significantly increased its shareholding position in IRB. Berkshire Hathaway subsequently issued an official statement denying any investment or intention to invest in the company. The revelation of the false claims and the confirmed accounting fraud resulted in a massive devaluation of the company's shares, a formal investigation by the CVM (the Brazilian Securities Commission), and the resignation of its top executives.

== Scandal of the IRB ==
Former deputy Roberto Jefferson, an insurance broker and state president Luiz Henrique Brandao Neto Appolonio were accused of corruption related to an allowance of 400,000 charged by the PTB to the real leader of the IRB.
