= Duda Mendonça =

Brazilian businessman (1944–2021)

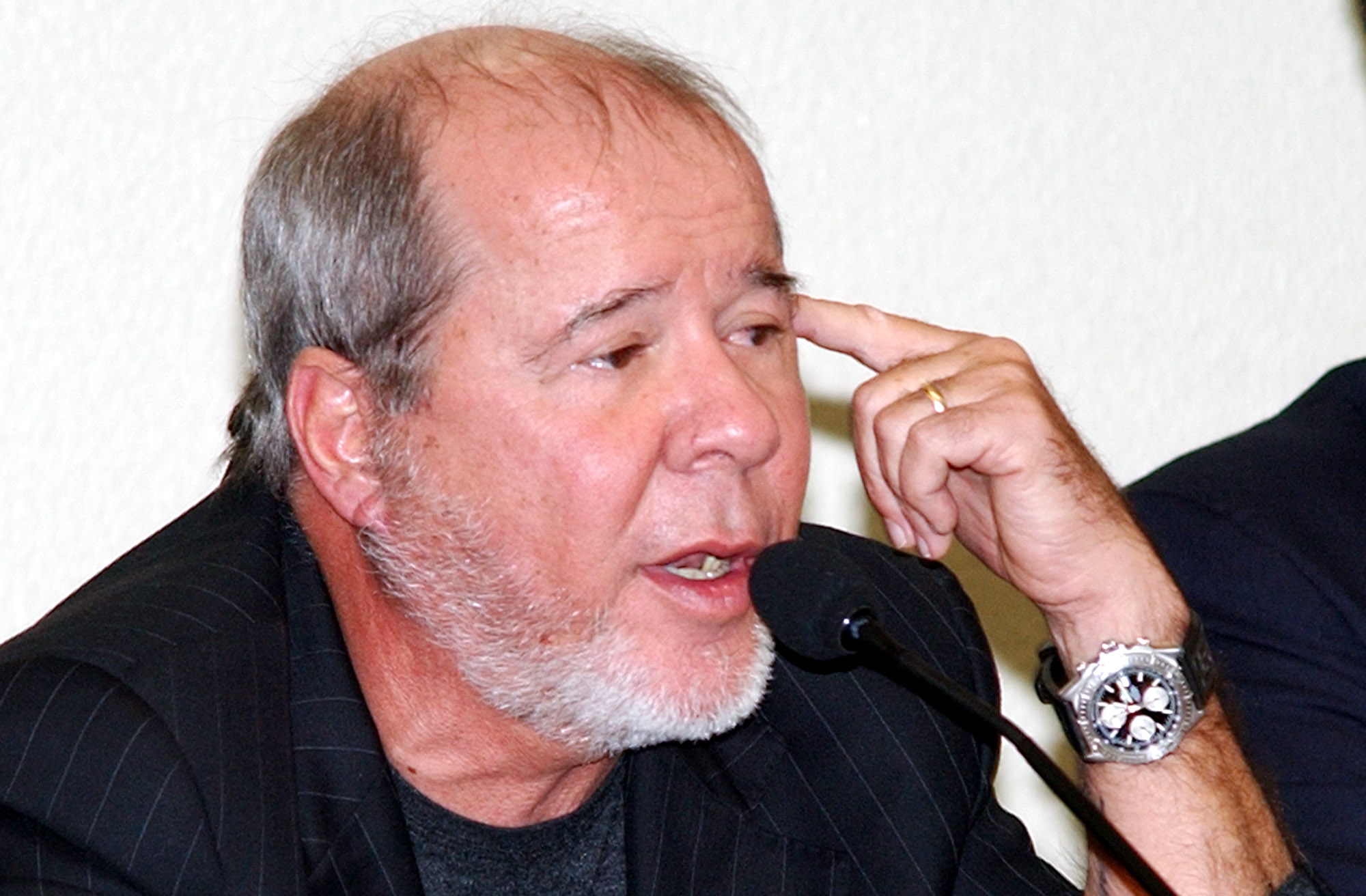
Mendonça in 2005

José Eduardo Cavalcanti de Mendonça, known as Duda Mendonça (10 August 1944 – 16 August 2021) was a Brazilian advertising strategist and businessman.

== Career ==
He owned a publicity agency called Duda Propaganda, where he became known for his political campaigns, managing more than 55 national campaigns, including mayoral, senatorial, gubernatorial and presidential races with more than 20 years of experience.

His work in the 2002 presidential campaign for Luiz Inácio Lula da Silva was praised. Duda was referred to as "the man who elected Lula", because he helped establish Lula as a more mainstream and moderate politician (Lulinha paz e amor), compared to the more radical left-wing approach of Lula’s 3 previous presidential campaigns.

He also worked on the campaigns of Paulo Maluf, Miguel Arraes, and Ciro Gomes in Brazil, and of the Portuguese Prime Minister Pedro Passos Coelho.

He worked for Óscar Iván Zuluaga's campaign in the 2014 Colombian presidential elections. He was allegedly paid with money illegally paid by the multinational Odebrecht to Zuluaga's campaign. Between June and July 2014, Odebrecht wired US$1,610,000 to the accounts of a company that the publicist had in Panama.

== Personal life ==
In October 2004, he was arrested at an illegal cock fighting arena in the State of Rio de Janeiro.

Mendonça was born in Salvador and died on 16 August 2021 in São Paulo, at the age of 77, from COVID-19, during the COVID-19 pandemic in Brazil. He was also suffering from a brain tumor.
