= Henrique Pizzolato =

Brazilian politician (born 1952)

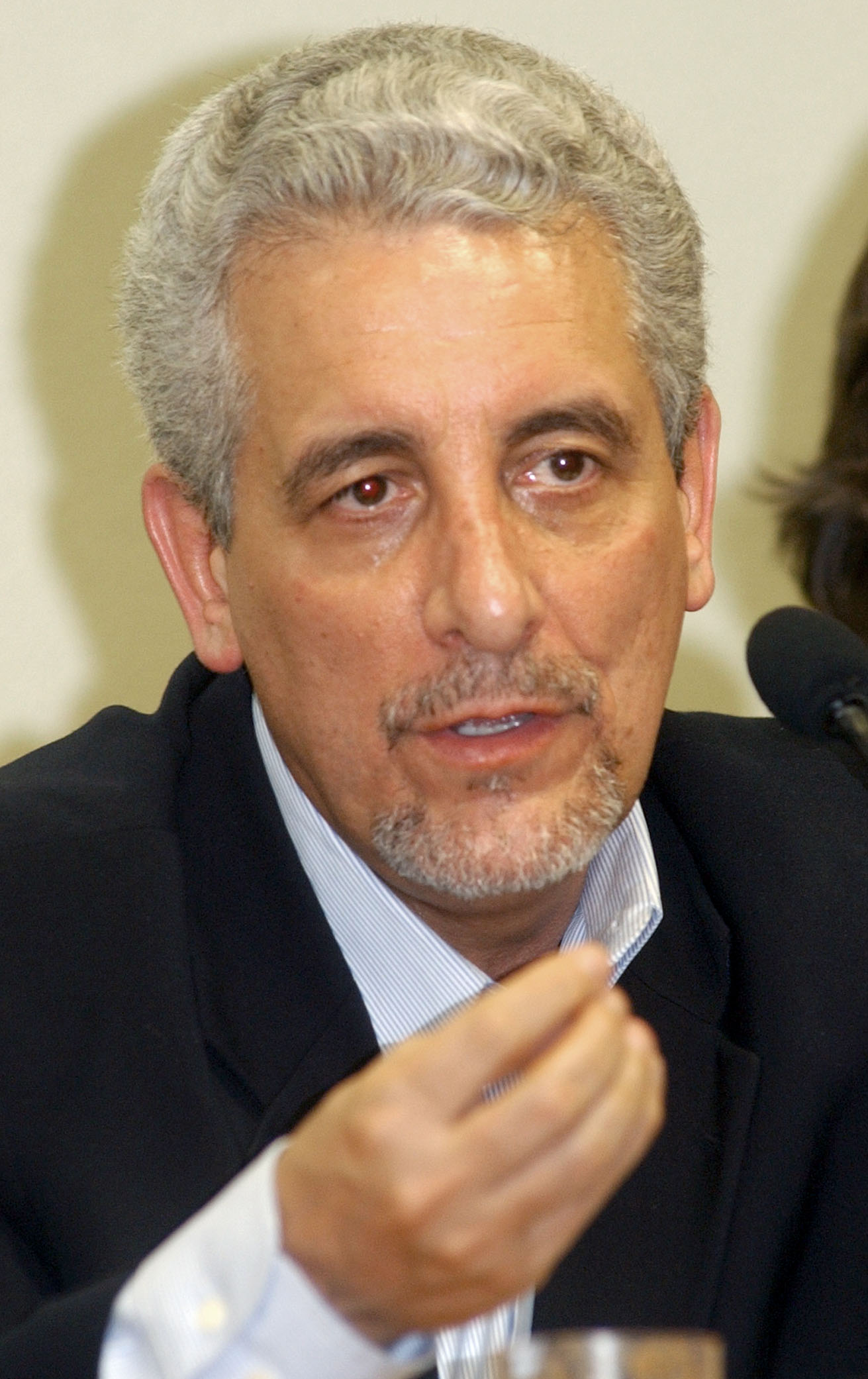
- Pizzolato in 2005

Personal details
- Born: 9 September 1952 (age 74) Concórdia, Santa Catarina, Brazil

Henrique Pizzolato (born 9 September 1952) is a former union leader in Brazil associated with the Workers Party (Portuguese: Partido dos Trabalhadores, PT), with electoral base in the state of Paraná. He was also director of the Bank of Brazil and president of the Bank of Union's Employees in Toledo (Paraná) and the CUT in the same state.

Pizzolato was denounced and condemned for bribery, embezzlement and money laundering in 2005. as a defendant in the proceedings in the Mensalão scandal case. He was the only one of those found guilty and sentenced to jail terms in the trial who did not turn himself in. On 5 February 2014, Pizzolato was arrested in Italy.

== Extradition ==
The arrest of Pizzolato was cause for celebration for others politicians arrested by order of the Brazilian Supreme Court, for the reopening of the case in an international court could cause a reversal in the path of the process in Brazil. On 5 June 2014, the court postponed a decision on extradition of Pizzolato; however, a new hearing was set for 28 October 2014. Subsequently, in this new hearing, the Bologna Court of Appeals denied the extradition of Mr. Pizzolato and ordered his release from prison, so he wait for the process free. Brazil appealed Pizzolato's case, and Italy's highest court, in 2015, ruled that Pizzolato should be extradited to Brazil. Pizzolato was successfully extradited to Brazil on October 23, 2015, where he arrived in the custody of Brazilian authorities to begin serving a 12-year prison sentence.
