= José Mentor =

Brazilian politician (1948–2020)

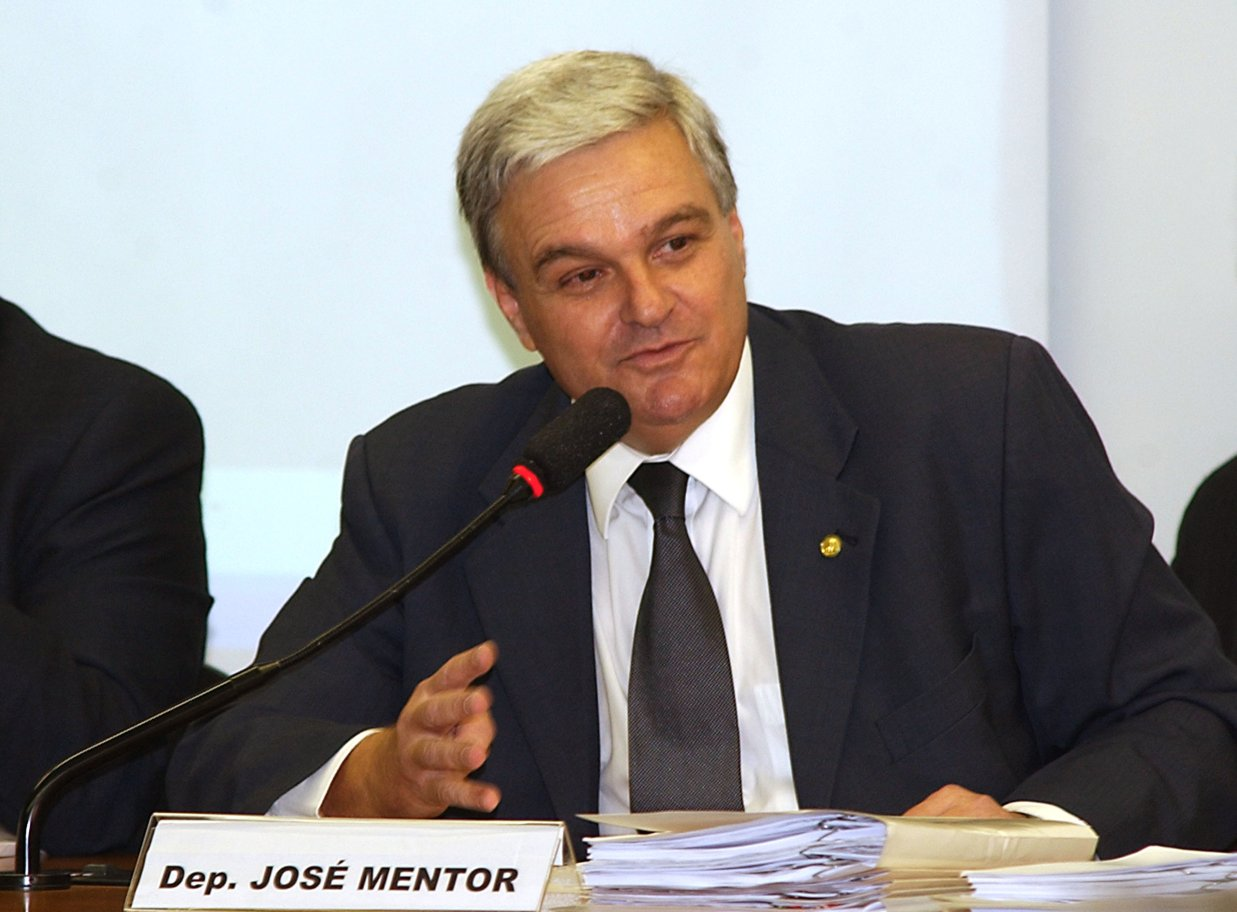

Member of the Chamber of Deputies from São Paulo
- In office 2003–2019

City councilor of São Paulo
- In office 1993–2003

Member of the Legislative Assembly of São Paulo
- In office 1989–1991

Personal details
- Born: 30 September 1948 Santa Isabel, São Paulo, Brazil
- Died: 25 July 2020 (aged 71) São Paulo, São Paulo, Brazil
- Party: Workers' Party (PT)
- Other political affiliations: Movimento Democrático Brasileiro (former)
- Education: Pontifical Catholic University of São Paulo
- Profession: Politician, lawyer

José Mentor Guilherme de Mello Netto (30 September 1948 – 25 July 2020), better known simply as José Mentor, was a Brazilian lawyer and politician from the state of São Paulo who served as a Federal Deputy.

== Career ==
Before pursuing a career in politics, Mentor graduated as a Lawyer at the Pontifical Catholic University of São Paulo.

Between the years of 1989 and 1991, he was elected and worked as a Member of the Legislative Assembly of São Paulo.

In 1992, he was elected City councilor of São Paulo. His tenure went from 1993 to 1996. In 1996, he was re-elected to the City council, and remained in office from 1997 to 2000, when he was again re-elected. His third and last term lasted until 2003.

in 2002, Mentor was elected a Member of the Chamber of Deputies, representing his birth state of São Paulo. His tenure went from 2003 to 2007, and in 2006, he was re-elected. His second term lasted from 2007 to 2011. In 2010, he was re-elected for a third term, lasting between 2011 and 2015. His fourth term started in 2015 and finished in 2019.

In 2018, he attempted to obtain a fifth term in the Chamber of Deputies, but he failed to secure enough votes to be elected.

== Death ==
On 25 July 2020, Mentor died in São Paulo at the age of 71 due to complications brought on by COVID-19 during the COVID-19 pandemic in Brazil.
