= Confederação Nacional dos Trabalhadores na Agricultura =

CONTAG
- National Confederation of Agricultural Workers
- Confederação Nacional dos Trabalhadores na Agricultura
- Founded: December 22, 1963
- Headquarters: Brasília, Brazil
- Location: Brazil
- Key people: Vânia Marques Pinto, president
- Website: www.contag.org.br

Confederação Nacional dos Trabalhadores na Agricultura (National Confederation of Agricultural Workers, CONTAG) is the largest federation of agricultural workers' labor unions in Brazil. It represents 20 million rural workers in 27 associations and around 4 thousand unions.

The CONTAG was founded on December 22, 1963 in Rio de Janeiro. At the time there were 14 associations and 475 rural workers' unions. With the 1964 military coup, the federation and its unions were taken over by the government. Many union leaders were imprisoned or forced into exile. However, by 1968 the organization began to act independently and encouraged the formation of rural unions and federations in Brazil. The number of rural unions grew from 625 in 1968 to 2144 in 1980.

== Presidents ==
Intervenor

| President | Term start | Term end | References | Notes |
|---|---|---|---|---|
| Lyndolpho Silva (SP) | 1963 | 1964 | | |
| José Rotta (SP) | 1965 | 1968 | | President appointed after 1964 |
| José Francisco da Silva (PE) | 1968 | 1989 | | |
| Aloísio Carneiro (BA) | 1989 | 1992 | | |
| Francisco Urbano de Araújo Filho (RN) | 1992 | 1997 | | |
| Manoel José dos Santos (PE) | 1998 | 2009 | | |
| Alberto Ercilio Broch (RS) | 2010 | 2017 | | |
| Aristides Veras dos Santos (PE) | 2017 | 2021 | | |
| Vânia Marques Pinto (BA) | 2025 | present | | First woman elected to lead the union |
