= Timeline of the Mensalão scandal =

The Mensalão scandal (Portuguese: Escândalo do Mensalão) took place in Brazil in 2005 and threatened to bring down the government of Luiz Inácio Lula da Silva. Mensalão is a neologism and variant of the word for "big monthly payment" (salário mensal or mensalidade).

== June ==
- 8 June 2005 – A CPI is installed to investigate alleged corruption in the Post Office after the testimony of Roberto Jefferson. Workers Party treasurer Delúbio Soares denied the claims in a press conference and said that he would authorize the investigation of all of his personal bank accounts.
- 14 June – Additional testimony of Roberto Jefferson in front of the Council of Ethics of the Chamber of the Deputies. Jefferson says that he informed the ministers Aldo Rebelo, Walfrido Mares Guia, Ciro Gomes, Miro Teixeira, José Dirceu and Antônio Palocci about the alleged payments. Palocci and Dirceu deny they were warned by Jefferson; Rebelo, Guia, and Gomes, and Teixeira confirm that Jefferson warned them about the existence of the "mensalão". Roberto Jefferson states that José Dirceu should resign from the government "quickly".
- 16 June – Minister of Civilian Household José Dirceu resigns. Dirceu was labeled by his opponents the "Rasputin" of the government because he was a strong figure with influence over President Lula.
- 17 June – Roberto Jefferson leaves the presidency of the Brazilian Labour Party (PTB)
- 22 June – Deputy Raquel Teixeira (Goiás) testifying in front of the Council of Ethics confirms that on 18 February 2004 deputy Sandro Mabel of the Liberal Party (PL) invited her to leave the PSDB in exchange for a monthly payment if she also promised to support the government. According to Raquel, the offer was R$30,000 (about US$12,913) a month – which could be increased up to a sum of R$50,000 (about US$21,521) with R$1 million ($430,420) as a "bonus" at the end of the year. Raquel says she denounced the request and spoke to the governor of Goiás Marconi Perillo about it.
- 22 June – Governor Marconi Perillo (PSDB-Goiás) tells the Council of Ethics that on 5 March 2004 during an official visit of President Luiz Inácio Lula da Silva to the food enterprise Perdigão S.A. in Rio Verde, he notified and warned the president about the offer received by deputy Raquel Teixeira (PSDB-Goiás).
- 30 June – With his left eye injured due to an accident moving an armoire – Deputy Roberto Jefferson (PTB-Rio de Janeiro) testifies to the Post Office CPI. Jefferson says that the agency of the Rural Bank at the 9th floor of Brasília shopping mall is used to withdraw the money of mensalão since the delivery by suitcases got very risky.

== July ==
- 4 July – Workers Party member Silvio Pereira resigns from his post as secretary general of the party. According to Jefferson he was the manager of the "mensalão".
- 4 July – The magazine Veja publishes photos of a contract from the Bank BMG S/A indicating Marcos Valério as the guarantor of a 17 February 2003 R$2.4 million bank loan to the Workers Party (PT). The document was signed by Workers Party President José Genoíno and party treasurer Delúbio Soares. Genoino claimed that he didn't read the document when he signed it. Valério had paid back the first R$300,000 of the loan.
- 5 July – Workers Party (PT) treasurer Delúbio Soares resigned.
- Deputy José Borba (leader of the PMDB) claimed that Valério, despite not having a public post, directly took part in the nomination of directors for strategic positions in state-run enterprises. Valério denied the claim.
- 6 July – It is discovered that Marcos Valério had moved more than R$800 million within his bank accounts in the past 3 years.
- 6 July – Marcos Valério testified before the Post Office CPI and maintained that he did not do anything illegal. The veracity of his testimony was questioned by parliamentarians and many political analysts because Valério spoke under a preemptive habeas corpus (exempting the individual from certain legal sanctions for not telling the truth) granted by Brazilian courts.
- 6 July – Deputy Carlos Rodrigues (bishop) (PL-RJ), former bishop of the Igreja Universal do Reino de Deus (Universal Church of the Kingdom of God) denied involvement in the scandal.
- 7 July – It became public that the Bank of Brazil (BB) had loaned R$20 million to the Workers' Party without any guarantor or guarantees. The CPI for the Post Office began to investigate loans to the Workers' Party. There were also new claims that members or supporters of the Workers' Party had unique control of the bank.
- 7 July – The bank, postal, and telephone records of Roberto Jefferson, Delúbio Soares, José Genoíno and José Dirceu were subpoenaed.
- 8 July – José Adalberto Vieira da Silva, an adviser to deputy José Nobre Guimarães, who is the brother of Workers' Party President José Genoíno, was detained at Cumbica airport in Guarulhos (SP) with US$100,000 in cash stuffed in his underpants and R$200,000 in his luggage.
- 9 July – Workers' Party president José Genoíno resigns.
- 12 July – Lula completes a ministerial reform which includes the removal of cabinet-level ministerial status from Luiz Gushiken, the Secretariat of Government Communication and Strategic Management (Secom), who had been suspected of having questionable relationships with pensions firms under his jurisdiction.
- 14 July – Mauro Marcelo, director of the Agência Brasileira de Inteligência (Abin), resigns after calling the Post Office CPI a "circus ring" and their members "wild beasts".
- Henrique Pizzolato, director of Marketing and Communications for the Banco do Brasil petitions for retirement. Several days earlier, Fernanda Karina Somaggio, former secretary of Marcos Valério had accused the director of being part of the circle that connected Valério to the government. Pizzolato had already been attacked because he used Banco do Brasil funds to pay for a Brazilian country music (sertaneja) concert which returned profits to the Workers Party (PT).
- 15 July – During an interview with the national newscast Jornal Nacional (Rede Globo) Marcos Valério admits that the funds in his bank accounts were used as loans to the Workers Party (PT), thereby administering an illegal off-book accounting scheme for the party.
- 15 July – A number of non-governmental parties assert that Valerio's concessions are actually a strategy to reduce the apparent severity of the crimes since the penalties for off-book accounting are less severe. Some parliamentarians on the CPI recall the "Uruguay Operation", a fictitious financial entity created by some supporters of the impeached President Fernando Collor de Mello to explain his alleged large financial gains. The deputy Eduardo Paes (PSDB-RJ) labels the Marcos Valério claims as the "Paraguay Operation" as an allusion to this episode. The Paraguayan ambassador to Brazil Luis González Arias protests against the use of the name of his country in this "pejorative manner".
- 17 July – During an interview to Rede Globo, Workers Party treasurer Delúbio Soares says that the only impropriety he committed was the use of off-book accounting as described by the businessman Marcos Valério two days earlier.
- 17 July – In Paris for the Bastille Day celebrations, Brazilian President Lula says during an exclusive interview with a Brazilian freelance journalist aired in Brazil by Rede Globo that off-book accounting is a "common practice in Brazil".
- 19 July – The former secretary-general of the Workers Party (PT) Silvio Pereira testifies with habeas corpus protection before the CPI on the Post Office. He does not explain how he received a Land Rover from an employee of the firm GDK whose president César Oliveira Silvio he admits to knowing. GDK had won a major contract of R$90 million together with Petrobras in 2004. Silvio Pereira, whose salary as a worker of the PT is R$9,000 per month, is accused of living a lifestyle incompatible with his inheritance and income, including a penthouse apartment in São Paulo and a mansion in Ilhabela
- 19 July – The subpoenaed bank records of Marcos Valério and his businesses reveal connections to the leaders of a number of parties, including the PT. The then former President of the House of Deputies João Paulo Cunha (PT-SP) appears to be the beneficiary of a withdrawal of R$50 thousand made by wife. This information denies his previous claim that his wife was seen at the Banco Rural branch only while paying a cable television bill. It is also discovered that there were withdrawals of R$320 thousand made by Anita Leocádia, an advisor to the leader of the PT in the House Paulo Rocha (PT-BA), in addition to numerous other withdrawals made by advisors to PT members and other party leaders.
- 20 July – The Vote Buying Congressional Inquiry (CPI) is installed.
- 20 July – Workers' Party (PT) treasurer Delúbio Soares testifies under habeas corpus protection before the Post Office CPI. He says that the only irregularity practiced by his party is book-off accounting and that he is the only guilty party.
- 20 July – Maria Christina Mendes Caldeira, the former wife of Deputy Valdemar Costa Neto (PL), accuses Valdemar of receiving the "mensalão". She says her former husband illegally brought dollars into Brazil and that he is a compulsive gambler.
- 20 July – Also, the STF, after a communication from the Council for Control of Financial Activities (COAF), blocks an account of Marcos Valério's wife Renilda Fernandes de Souza after she tried to withdraw R$1.8 million from a Bank Boston account in Belo Horizonte, MG
- 20 July – The President of the Municipal Foundation of Culture in Belo Horizonte Rodrigo Barroso Fernandes resigns because of accusations related to money laundering. He has ties to Belo Horizonte mayor Fernando Pimentel (PT) because of his work as treasurer during the 2002 election campaign. Rodrigo's name had appeared in the lists of withdrawals from the accounts of Valério's firms SMP&B and DNA (including a R$350 thousand withdrawal from an account of SMP&B with Banco Rural).
- 21 July – Deputy Paulo Rocha resigns as the leader of the Workers' Party (PT) in the Chamber of Deputies.
- 22 July – In Rio de Janeiro, Lula states that "among 180 million Brazilians, there is not a single man or woman" that can lecture him about ethics and that the "Brazilian elite" will not bring him down.
- 22 July – The head of the CPI on the Post Office Delcídio Amaral admits that Roberto Costa Pinho worked for his election campaign in 2002. Roberto was discovered to have initiated a withdrawal of R$350 thousand from an account of SMP&B, a firm of Valério's. Also, Amaral confirms that he was guarantor of a rent contract for a house in Campo Grande/Mato Grosso do Sul for Costa Pinho.
- 22 July – The former secretary-general of the Workers' Party (PT) Silvio Pereira admits that it was improper to accept a Land Rover from a businessman. He apologizes and requests his disaffiliation from the Workers' Party.
- 22 July – Newspapers, including O Globo, report that the police have recorded a phone conversation between members of the "máfia da previdência", a gang specializing in fraud against the National Social Security Institute (INSS) and the Receita Federal (Federal Revenue Service), mentioning the names of political figures Delúbio Soares, José Dirceu and Roberto Jefferson. The Ministério Público Federal (the Federal Prosecutor's Office) begins to investigate the new connection. here
- 28 July – Newspapers report that Delúbio Soares had told the General Public Prosecution Office that the loans guaranteed by Marcos Valério paid expenses connected to the government transition and Presidential inauguration.
- 28 July – In Rio Grande do Sul, Lula states that the economy is vulnerable and that the policies of his government had antagonized the opposition.

== August ==
- 1 August – President of the PL, Valdemar Costa Neto, resigns. He concedes that he received illegal money to pay off debts from his political campaigns.
- 2 August – President of the Brazilian Social Democracy Party (PSDB) Eduardo Azeredo confesses that his reelection campaign for the state of Minas Gerais maintained a system of off-book funds and received money from Marcos Valério. Azeredo tries to minimize the weight of the accusations against him by claiming they attempt to divert attention from the investigations of the CPI for the Post Office. He maintains that funding irregularities in the election campaigns should not be confused with the more serious charges regarding monthly payments to influence congressional votes.
- 2 August – Deputy and former minister José Dirceu (PT-SP) testifies before the Ethics Council. Deputy Roberto Jefferson (PTB-RJ) sits in the front row at the hearing. Dirceu denies Jefferson's accusations regarding the payment of monthly allowances. Jefferson reaffirms all of his previous accusations and makes a new allegation as well. Jefferson claims that in January 2005 PT and PTB emissaries were sent to Portugal to request money from the firm Portugal Telecom.
- 3 August – It is discovered that Marcos Valério had paid the lawyers for the Workers' Party (PT) in the case of the murder of Mayor Celso Daniel (PT-SP).
- 3 August – The Brazilian government denies that Marcos Valério was ever authorized to present himself as an "adviser of the President of Brazil to the government of Portugal or in any other situation".
- 3 August – Lula visits his birthplace Garanhuns and Teresina. He says that "with or without hatred, they will to have to swallow me", "who should pay, will pay", and that "it is necessary to separate the wheat from the chaff".
- 4 August – Public Works Minister of Portugal Antonio Mexia has a meeting with the Brazilian ambassador Antônio Paes de Andrade in Portugal. Mexia says that he had "the opportunity to make clear to the ambassador the total repudiation of the attempt to involve his name in internal political questions in Brazil."
- 4 August – Mexia says that Marcos Valério didn't introduce himself as a "consultant of Brazilian government". Mexia's declarations contradict his statements in an earlier interview to the Portuguese newspaper Expresso, on 16 July 2005. Mexia had said to Expresso that he had received Valério as the "consultant of the Brazilian government".
- 4 August – The press reports that the official schedule reveals that Marcos Valério had met with the President of the bank that controlled shares in Portugal Telecom thirteen days before his trip to Lisbon with the treasurer of the PTB and meeting with officials from the firm.
- 5 August – Portugal Telecom repudiates the insinuations that they had an underhanded relationship with Marcos Valério. The President of the firm Miguel Horta e Costa says that the company could sue Roberto Jefferson.
- 8 August – Marcos Valério distributes a statement to the press denying the version of his trip presented by Roberto Jefferson and says that the trip to Portugal was to have negotiations with Portugal Telecom in relation to the business Telemig Celular. Valério says that he and his friend, the secretary of the PTB Emerson Palmieri accompanied him on his trip in order to "relax".
- 11 August – The vice-president of the Vote-Buying CPI, deputy Paulo Pimenta (PT-RS) resigns. The day before Pimenta had released a controversial list of the names of politicians who had supposedly received money from Marcos Valério. The list was attacked by the President of the CPI Senator Amir Lando and others. The lawyers of Marcos Valério stated that the list was unknown. Pimenta had been accused of having had a secret encounter with Marcos Valério in the Senate's garage where they rode together in Valerio's car.
- 11 August – Public relations specialist and advertiser Duda Mendonça testifies suddenly and spontaneously before the Post Office CPI. He accuses Marcos Valério of asking him to open an offshore bank account to receive payments for his services managing political campaigns for the PT in 2002 and 2004. Deputies from the PT announce their separation from the party in Congress.
- 12 August – The magazine Época, number 378, prints an interview with the former deputy Valdemar Costa Neto. Costa Neto says, according to the magazine, that Lula and José Alencar knew about the payment of R$10 million from the Workers Party (PT) to the Liberal Party to form an alliance which resulted in the election list that stood in the 2002 presidential election.
- 12 August – In a public pronouncement transmitted on television, President Luiz Inácio Lula da Silva says, "I have no shame to say the Brazilian people that we need to apologize. The PT needs to request forgiveness. The government, when it errs, needs to request forgiveness." Without citing names, he says he was "betrayed."
- 16 August – Lawyer Rogério Tadeu Buratti is arrested in Ribeirão Preto accused of money laundering. He worked as a municipal secretary in Ribeirão Preto during the term of mayor Antonio Palocci, later the Minister of Finance in the government of Lula.
- 16 August – The Post Office CPI travels to São Paulo to speak with the dollar dealer Antonio Oliveira Claramunt, aka "Toninho da Barcelona", who has been sentenced to 25 years in prison for money laundering. Toninho claims he has information about the financial activities of important politicians including members of the Workers' Party. He promises to reveal his information in exchange for protection and a reduction of his sentence.
- 16 August – The chief secretary and unofficial treasurer of the PTB, Emerson Palmieri testifies in front of the Vote Buying CPI that he traveled along with Marcos Valério to Portugal to attend a meeting of Portugal Telecom where Valério was supposed to request financial help for the Workers Party and PTB. He says that he doesn't consider himself a friend of Valério.
- 17 August – The Workers Party (PT) National Executive Committee issues a request asking the nation's forgiveness. It states: "For the first time the party is asking for the country's pardon, for acts practiced by leaders of the party without the knowledge of other party members, acts that in the eyes of the Brazilian nation, were morally and politically condemnable."
- 19 August – Buratti makes an agreement with the authorities and reveals the alleged plan and receipt of money in numerous local districts in Minas Gerais and São Paulo. The most controversial element is his allegation regarding the Minister of Finance Antonio Palocci who was mayor (1993–1996) of Ribeirão Preto and whom Buratti accuses of receiving 50 million reals from garbage collection firms.
- 19 August – Buratti makes an agreement with the authorities and reveals the alleged plan and receipt of money in numerous local districts in Minas Gerais and São Paulo. The most controversial element is his allegation regarding the Minister of Finance Antonio Palocci who was mayor (1993–1996) of Ribeirão Preto and whom Buratti accuses of receiving 50 million reals from garbage collection firms.
- 20 August – the magazine Veja, edition 1919, dated 24 August, releases the allegations of Rogério Tadeu Buratti and the currency dealer "Toninho da Barcelona".
- 21 August – the Minister of Finance Antonio Palocci makes a statement transmitted on television that denies "with vehemence" all of the allegations made by former advisor Rogério Tadeu Buratti.
- 23 August – Former deputy and President of the Liberal Party Valdemar Costa Neto tells the CPI for the investigation of the Bingo scandal that he received from Workers' Party treasurer Delúbio Soares checks from the account of Marcos Valério of a total of R$6.5 million over 18 months until January 2005. According to Costa Neto, the money was used to pay debts of the campaign of Lula in São Paulo. He says that at first he didn't believe that the money he was receiving was illegal and he alleges the political agreement between PL and PT was normal and proper.
- 24 August – The Supreme Federal Tribunal, responsible for judging criminal proceedings against parliamentarians due to parliamentary immunity, accepted the indictments of 40 individuals relating to the Mensalão scandal, most which are former or current federal deputies, all of which were allies of Brazilian president Luiz Inácio Lula da Silva.
- 25 August – Rogério Buratti testifies in front of the CPI investigating the Bingo scandal and confirms the claims about irregularities in the local government of Ribeirão Preto during the term of mayor Antonio Palocci, present day Minister of Finance.
- 25 August – The House accepts the retirement of deputy Valdemar Costa Neto, granting his petition. Valdemar is able to receive a monthly pension of R$5.542 until the end of his life, except if he is reelected.
- 29 August – Deputy André Costa (PT-RJ) announces his separation with the Workers Party (PT) and states that because of the scandal accusations he no longer supports the government and the party. Costa is the first deputy to abandon the party since the breaking of the scandal.
- 29 August – The Ethics Council recommends the expulsion of deputy Roberto Jefferson (PTB-RJ). The resolution needs to be affirmed by a Congressional vote to be enacted.
- 30 August – In Minas Gerais state, Lula recalls the experiences of previous Brazilian Presidents: Jânio Quadros, João Goulart, Getúlio Vargas, and Juscelino Kubitschek. Lula claims that he is inspired by Juscelino Kubitschek. Lula says that he considers the crisis "extremely serious" and says that "it is necessary to be very patient in order to avoid any hasty decisions."
- 30 August – The newspaper Folha de S. Paulo publishes an interview with the President of the Chamber of the Deputies Severino Cavalcanti (PP-PE) where he defends lighter punishments for the guilty deputies.
- 30 August – Brazilian parliamentarians criticize Cavalcanti's statements. Senator Demostenes Torres (PFL-GO) accuses Cavalcanti of promoting an agreement to avoid the expulsion of some deputies.

== September ==
- 1 September – The CPI for the Bingo scandal hears the ophthalmologist João Francisco Daniel, brother of the assassinated mayor of Santo André (SP), Celso Daniel (PT-SP). João says that his brother participated in a corruption scheme in the local district of Santo André used to collect funds for the Workers' Party (PT). According to João, Celso died after discovering that some people including the ex-bodyguard Sérgio Gomes da Silva (aka "O Sombra" or "The Shadow", suspected of having assassinated Celso Daniel) were diverting funds intended for the Workers' Party to themselves.
- 1 September – João Francisco Daniel testifies before the CPI for the Bingo scandal that the money in the corruption scheme in Santo André was transported in suitcases and delivered to José Dirceu, during the period he was President of the Workers' Party (PT). João says that the present chief of Lula's cabinet Gilberto Carvalho took part in the scheme. Dirceu and Carvalho deny the accusations.
- 1 September – The Post Office and Vote Buying parliamentary commissions unanimously approve their first joint preliminary report. The report accuses 18 deputies of involvement in the scandal.
- 9 September – Senator Cristovam Buarque (DF) leaves the Workers Party (PT). He later joins the Democratic Labour Party (PDT).
- 12 September – Deputy Carlos Rodrigues resigns. Rodrigues' name had appeared in the CPIs' first joint preliminary report in the list of the 18 deputies accused of involvement in the scandal.
- 13 September – Political Coordination and Institutional Affairs ex-Minister Aldo Rebelo (PCdoB) confirms in front of the Council of Ethics that the deputy Roberto Jefferson warned Lula in March 2005 about the payments to deputies. According to Rebelo, Lula ordered an investigation and the question was shelved because of a concluded lack of evidence.
- 14 September – The Brazilian Chamber of Deputies approves the expulsion of Deputy Roberto Jefferson (PTB-RJ), following the recommendation of the Council of Ethics.
- 15 September – Post Office CPI reports that the bank accounts of eight enterprises belonging to Marcos Valério received 4.9 billion reals (about 2.24 billion U.S. dollars) between 2000 and 2005. The big financial activities are from DNA propaganda (2.6 billion reals) and SMPB (1,8 billion reals). The CPI's assistant reporter on financial activities, deputy Gustavo Fruet (PSDB-PR), says that the investigations show evidence of misrepresentation, corruption, illegal inducement, dishonest acts of administration and crimes against the financial system.
- 20 September – The convicted dollar dealer, Antônio Oliveira Claramunt – A.K.A. "Toninho da Barcelona", tells the Post Office, Bingo and Mensalão CPIs the money transferred to the Workers' Party (PT) by the Rural Bank came from foreign accounts belonging to Marcos Valério, and was introduced into Brazil through transactions with money changers. "Two schemes fattened the PT's account. These schemes involved the Rural Bank and the Bonus-Banval brokerage firm," says Barcelona.
- 21 September – The President of the House of Deputies Severino Cavalcanti resigns. He was under pressure in relation to accusations about bribes received from a restaurant located in the Congression building. Deputy José Thomaz Nonô (Liberal Front Party – Alagoas) assumes power temporarily.
- 22 September – President of Banco Rural Kátia Rabelo tells the Council of Ethics that "the Banco Rural was used by Marcos Valério" but denies any bank involvement in the corruption scheme. Rabelo says that Valério had scheduled meetings between the bank's leadership and government minister José Dirceu.
- 23 September – The Executive offers 500 million reals to Brazilian parliamentarians' pet projects. The Minister of Planning, Budget, and Management Paulo Bernardo denies any relationship between the funds granted by the government and the upcoming election for the new President of the Congress.
- 27 September – Testifying in the front of the Council of Ethics, Ex-minister and deputy José Dirceu denies participation by Lula or himself in any corruption scheme.
- 28 September – The Government's candidate Aldo Rebelo from the Brazilian Communist Party wins the election for the Presidency of the House. The election is perceived as a victory for Lula and other politicians under pressure by the scandal.

== October ==
- 5 October – The main suspects in connection to the corruption allegations regarding contracts between the Brazilian public bank Caixa Econômica Federal and the enterprise Gtech confront each other in front of the Bingo CPI. Waldomiro Diniz, Enrico Gianelli, Rogério Buratti, Marcelo José Rovai, and Carlos Augusto de Almeida Ramos (Carlinhos Cachoeira) exchange insults and accusations.
- 6 October – Bruno José Daniel Filho, younger brother of Celso Daniel, tells the Bingo CPI that the President's cabinet chief Gilberto Carvalho was aware of the alleged corruption scheme in the municipality of Santo André.
- 11 October – Lula's former minister Ricardo Berzoini is elected president of the Workers Party.
- 12 October – The medical examiner responsible for examining the body of Celso Daniel, Carlos Delmonte Printes (55), is found dead in his residence by police. The physician is allegedly the seventh person in connection with the case to have been found dead under mysterious circumstances.
- 18 October – The Council of Ethics' rapporteur in the case against deputy José Dirceu, deputy Júlio Delgado (PSB-Minas Gerais), calls for Dirceu's expulsion for breach of parliamentary decorum.
- 19 October – Ex-treasurer for the President of the PSDB, Senator Eduardo Azeredo (Minas Gerais), tells the Post Office CPI of having received US$4.863 million (R$11 million) from Marcos Valério during Azeredo's gubernatorial reelection campaign in 1998.
- 22 October – The Workers Party approves the expulsion of the ex-treasurer Delúbio Soares, nearly five months since the original denunciations made by Roberto Jefferson.
- 25 October – The President of PSDB, Senator Eduardo Azeredo, resigns his post.
- 25 October – Federal judge João Carlos da Rocha Mattos, arrested in November 2003 in São Paulo for alleged involvement in corruption involving influencing judicial sentences, testifies in front of the Bingo CPI claiming that the Workers Party didn't want a full investigation of the murder of mayor Celso Daniel.
- 26 October – Brothers of Celso Daniel, João Francisco and Bruno, confront presidential cabinet chief Gilberto Carvalho in the Bingo CPI. The brothers claim that Carvalho is aware of the alleged corruption scheme in Santo André, São Paulo. Both say that Carvalho transported a suitcase with money from the corruption scheme in Santo Andre by car to then Workers Party President José Dirceu. They also accuse the Workers Party of putting obstacles in the way of the investigation. Gilberto Carvalho denies all the accusations and accuses the brothers of disrespecting the memory of Celso Daniel.
- 28 October – Attorney general Luciano Sampaio Gomes Rolim initiates legal action against José Dirceu for alleged impropriety. Documents brought forward by the Attorney General's office indicate that between 2003 and 2004 Dirceu organized a special privileged structure for granting federal money for his son, the mayor of Cruzeiro do Oeste (Paraná), José Carlos Becker de Oliveira (aka Zeca Dirceu).
- 29 October – Vladimir Poleto and Rogerio Buratti, two former advisers to Finance Minister Antonio Palocci, are quoted in the Brazilian magazine Veja claiming that Cuban funds were used to support the political campaign of Luiz Inácio Lula da Silva in 2002. According to the magazine's different sources, either $3 or $1.4 million are brought to Brazil through former diplomat and Cuban Communist Party leader Sergio Cervantes. Poleto states that he personally carried the money by plane from Brasília to Campinas. He claimed the money was then carried by car to São Paulo and finally delivered to the Workers Party treasurer Delúbio Soares in Vila Mariana. He explicitly states that the money was hidden in boxes of liquor: Johnnie Walker Red Label and Black Label and Havana Club.
- 30 October – The Cuban embassy in Brasília denies the allegations that Cuba illegally contributed to da Silva's political campaign: "The Government of Cuba categorically rejects this slander and confirms it has never interfered in the internal affairs of a sister nation and attributes full responsibility for this propaganda scheme on the aggressive plans of the imperialists against Cuba and Lula".
- 31 October – Leader of the Cuban Communist Party Sérgio Cervantes leaves Brazil without commenting on the information regarding Cuba.

== November ==
- 1 November – In Congress, deputy Antonio Carlos Magalhães Neto (PFL) said that he and his family were being spied on by ABIN agents. Like Virgílio, Magalhães Neto says that he is able to "trash" President Lula. In the Senate, senator Heloísa Helena (PSOL) says that she is also able to "trash" President Lula due to threats to her family.
- 1 November – The Council of Ethics dismisses the expulsion process against the leader of the Liberal Party, deputy Sandro Mabel. The deputy Raquel Teixeira (PSDB) accused Mabel of trying to bribe her. The Council of Ethics' conclusion is that there is no evidence to back such a claim and it is boils down to the word of one against the other.
- 2 November – The president of the Council of Ethics, deputy Ricardo Izar (PTB-SP) declares that he found a covert listening device in his office.
- 3 November – The Post Office CPI rapporteur, deputy Osmar Serraglio (PMDB-PR) and the deputy Eduardo Paes (PSDB-RJ) believe they are victims of eavesdropping attempts as well.
- 3 November – The Post Office CPI rapporteur deputy Osmar Serraglio (PMDB-PR) claims to have discovered a scheme for diverting 10 million Reais (approximately US$4.5 million) from the state-run Banco do Brasil to the Worker's Party. According to Serraglio the money was transferred via the Visanet company to bank accounts held by the advertising executive Marcos Valério, and from there to the Workers Party.
- 3 November – The businessman Roberto Colnaghi confirms he lent his Seneca airplane prefix PT-RSX on 31 July 2002, though he refuses to say to whom he loaned the plane, declaring that "the identity is implicity".
- 5 November – The pilot Alécio Fongaro tells Folha de S. Paulo and Veja he flew from Brasília to Campinas on 31 July 2002. The pilot says that he flew in company of Vladimir Poleto and 3 sealed boxes of whiskey. The Brazilian Civil Aviation Department (DAC) confirms the airplane's route.
- 7 November – President Lula tells Brazilian TV show Roda Viva that the "mensalão" has never existed and it is piece of "folklore of the Congress". Lula defends his former minister José Dirceu against the charges of improbity.
- 9 November – The former Minister of Transportation Anderson_Adauto_Pereira (PL) tells the Vote Buying CPI that he used undeclared funds in 11 political campaigns. Adauto confirms he received 410,000 Reais (about U$187,138) from Marcos Valério.
- 9 November – The Congress approves the Council of Ethics report which absolves the deputy Sandro Mabel (PL-GO).
- 10 November – The former aide of Finance Minister Antonio Palocci, Rogério Buratti, tells the Bingo CPI that he was consulted by Ralf Barquete -close advisor of Palocci- about how to bring $3 million from Cuba in 2002. According to Buratti, the money came and it was used in Lula's political campaign.
- 10 November – Lula prepares a political operation to the time-extension of the Post Office CPI. The Executive branch promises to free 1.2 billion Reais (547.72 million dollars) in appropriations for deputies who do not sign the extension bill. 35 deputies decide to remove their signatures. A preliminary count shows 170 signatures of deputies supporting the bill. Since the minimum number of signatures of deputies is 171, it seems that the extension will not be approved.
- 11 November – A new count shows that there are signatures of 171 deputies and 35 senators supporting the extension of the works of the Post Office CPI. The bill is approved and the Post Office CPI is extended for 120 days more, until 2006.
- 11 November – The economist Vladimir Poleto – former aid of Treasury Minister Antonio Palocci when he was the Mayor of the city of Ribeirão Preto- speaks under a writ of habeas corpus (preventing his immediate arrest in case of perjury) to the Bingos CPI. Poleto alleges his interview to the Brazilian magazine Veja should not be considered reliable because he was threatened by the journalist and he spoke under the influence of alcohol. The economist told he transported 3 boxes of Johnnie Walker whiskey from Brasília to Campinas (by airplane) and from Campinas to São Paulo (by car) on 31 July 2002 as a favor to his friend Ralf Barquete. Poleto guarantees the shipment was only whiskey. The senators of the CPI ask Poleto to explain the motives for a complex and expensive operation to deliver an alcoholic beverage which can be easily bought in any Brazilian supermarket, including in São Paulo, the ultimate destination. Vladimir Poleto does not answer.
- 11 November – The magazine Veja publishes on its website the audio file of the interview given by Vladimir Poleto. The senators of the Bingos CPI play the file in front of Poleto. The tape contradicts Poleto's previous statements. In the recording, the journalist begins the conversation with Poleto's verbal permission. Poleto's voice is also not slurred in any way, indicating that he was not drunk. The senators ridicule the testimony of Vladimir Poleto and they approve a statement asking for the indictment of Poleto for perjury.
- 16 November – Afternoon. The minister of Finance Antonio Palocci speaks to the Brazilian Senate Economic Affairs Commission (CAE). The senators don't ask about the allegations of corruption involving the name of the Minister. The senators understand that the Minister should explain the accusations before a CPI. Palocci does make a short statement denying the accusations of corruption during his administration in Ribeirão Preto and of Cuban, FARC and Angola funds tied to the political campaign of Luiz Inácio Lula da Silva in 2002, of which Palocci was one of the main coordinators.
