= Delúbio Soares =

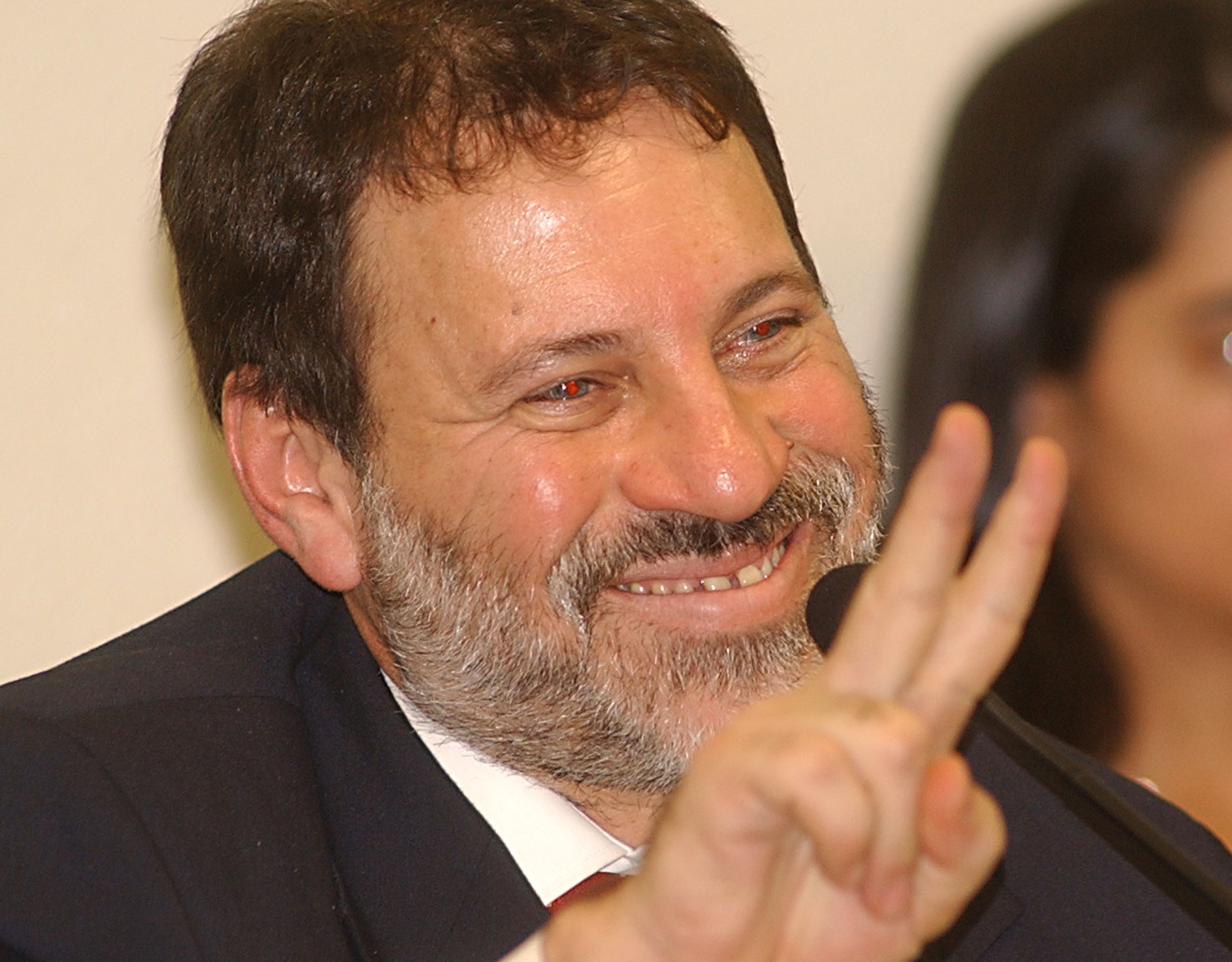

Treasurer of the Workers' Party
- In office November 6, 2000 – February 14, 2005

Personal details
- Born: November 6, 1955 (age 70) Buriti, Alegre, Goiás
- Party: Worker's Party
- Occupation: Academic, politician

Delúbio Soares de Castro (Buriti Alegre, November 6, 1955) is a Brazilian trade unionist who has had a long professional association with the Brazilian Workers Party (PT). He is particularly noted for his involvement in the mensalão scandal.

== Background ==
A native of Goiás, Soares graduated with a degree in mathematics from the Catholic University of Goias.

He is married to Monica Valente.

== Career ==
Soares has been active in Brazilian politics since the 1970s, when he worked for the Amnesty Movement in Goiânia (GO). During this period, he began to teach mathematics in public schools in Goiás and to participate in the coordination of teacher's strikes. He helped found the Central Única dos Trabalhadores (CUT), at which he held the posts of Secretary of Trade Union Policy and Secretary of Finance, and the Trade Union of Education Workers of Goiás.

He was also a coordinator of Luiz Inácio Lula da Silva's presidential campaigns in 1989 and 1998. He was a member of the National Directorate of the PT, held the position of Trade Union Secretary from 1995 to 2000, and became the treasurer of the PT. For many years, Soares was also part of the political group known as the Majoritarian Camp, which later changed its name to Building a New Brazil.

== Mensalão scandal ==
On June 6, 2005, Brazilian deputy Roberto Jefferson told the Folha de S.Paulo newspaper that the PT had paid some deputies 30,000 reais (then around US$12,000) per month apiece to vote for certain legislation favored by the party. This led to the so-called Mensalão scandal, “mensalão” being a neologism referring to large monthly payments. After being identified as a key figure in the scandal, Soares was expelled from PT, a decision that was approved by a majority of votes in the National Directory.

Soares was one of forty persons who were denounced to the Federal Supreme Court (STF) on March 30, 2006, by Attorney General Antonio Fernando de Souza for having been involved in the distribution of the secret payments. Souza described the group as a criminal organization and named José Dirceu, José Genoino, Silvio Pereira, and Delúbio as its leaders. Delúbio played a crucial role in the Mensalão scandal, causing a significant crisis for the Luiz Inácio Lula da Silva administration and nearly cost him his reelection. Of all the persons involved in the Mensalão scandal, Soares was the only one to be expelled from the party. Six years later, by a vote of 60 to 15, the PT's national directory permitted Soares to return to the party.

In November 2012, Soares was sentenced by the STF to 8 years and 11 months in prison for conspiracy and racketeering in connection with the Mensalão scandal. After he appealed the sentence, the STF acquitted him of the charge of racketeering in 2014. In September 2014 he was permitted to serve the remainder of his sentence under house arrest. In March 2016, he was pardoned for his participation in the scandal and released from prison.

== Operation Car Wash ==
On April 1, 2016, Soares was one of the targets of the 27th phase of Operation Car Wash (Lava Jato). This phase of the operation was named Carbono 14 and it involved the R$12 million loan made by Banco Schahin to cattle rancher Jose Carlos Bumlai, half of which was funneled to Ronan Maria Pinto, owner of the newspaper Diario do Grande ABC. The fund was eventually spent on campaigns for political candidates supported by the PT. Soares was initially brought in as a witness but was indicted as a defendant in the Carbon 14 action for the crime of money laundering.

Federal Judge Sergio Moro found him and four other defendants guilty, and sentenced him on March 2, 2017, to five years in prison, noting that he had previously been convicted of complicity in the Mensalao scandal and that the money laundering in this case was particularly sophisticated, in that two people were interposed between the source of the funds and their final destination and that the scheme had involved two false loan agreements. Soares appealed his conviction. After Bumlai was questioned again in February 2019, Soares asked in March 2019 that Bumlai be questioned yet again, claiming that in 2016 Bumlai's testimony had effectively absolved him, Soares, of guilt. In late March, a panel of judges denied requests to free Soares and others jailed in Operation Car Wash.

== See also ==
- List of scandals in Brazil
