= Tito Livio Ferreira =

Brazilian historian, teacher, and journalist

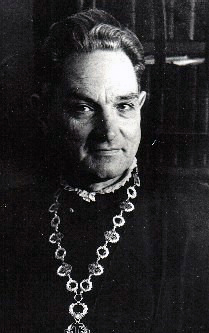
- Born: 4 June 1894; São Paulo, Brazil
- Died: 15 December 1988 (aged 94); São Paulo, Brazil

Education
- Education: Federal University of Rio de Janeiro

Philosophical work
- Region: Brazilian historian
- Notable ideas: Brazil was not a colony

Tito Livio Ferreira (June 4, 1894 – December 15, 1988) was a Brazilian historian, professor, and journalist. He taught Portuguese and Medieval history at the Pontifical Catholic University of São Paulo.

== Partial bibliography ==
(By year of first ed.)

- "Anchieta e as Canárias" (1953)
- "Padre Manoel da Nobrega" (1957)
- “História da Civilização Brasileira” (1959)
- “A Maçonaria na Independência Brasileira” (1961)
- "Histórico das Festas Centenarias da Beneficêcia Portuguesa de S. Paulo" (1964)
- "História da Educação Lusobrasileira" (1966)
- "Nóbrega e Anchieta Em São Paulo de Piratininga"
- "O Elemento Espanhol na Capitania de São Vicente" (1973)
- "O Idioma Oficial do Brasil é o Português?" (1977)
- "A Ordem de Cristo e o Brasil" (Ibrasa, 1980)
- "O Brasil não foi Colónia".
