= Belchior =

Belchior may refer to:

- Belchior (singer) (1946–2017), Brazilian singer
- Belchior (footballer) (born 1982), Portuguese footballer
- Douglas Belchior (born 1978), Brazilian teacher and activist
