= Celso Daniel =

Brazilian politician (1951–2002)

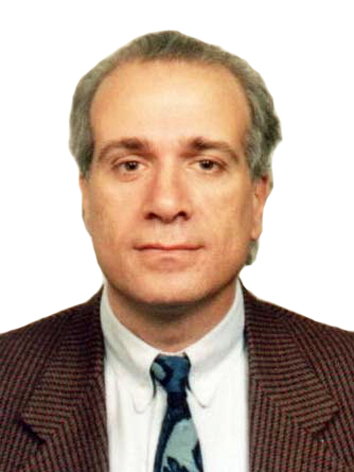

20th Mayor of Santo André
- In office 1 January 2002 – 18 January 2002
- Vice Mayor: João Avamileno
- Preceded by: Newton Brandão
- Succeeded by: João Avamileno

18th Mayor of Santo André
- In office 1 January 1989 – 1 January 1993
- Preceded by: Newton Brandão
- Succeeded by: Newton Brandão

Personal details
- Born: Celso Augusto Daniel; April 16, 1951 Santo André, SP, Brazil
- Died: January 18, 2002 (aged 50) Juquitiba, SP, Brazil
- Cause of death: Assassination by gunshots
- Party: PT (1988–2002)
- Spouse: Miriam Belchior

Celso Augusto Daniel (April 16, 1951 – January 18, 2002) was the mayor in 2002 for the third time of the city of Santo André in São Paulo, Brazil, as a representative of the Workers' Party (PT). He was kidnapped and murdered in the same year.

A civil engineer who graduated in 1973, from the Engenharia Mauá School, in São Caetano do Sul, he followed an academic career and obtained a master's degree in public administration from the Fundação Getúlio Vargas (FGV-SP) and a doctorate in political science from the Pontifícia Universidade Católica (PUC-SP). He acted later as a teacher in both universities. As mayor he was connected to the United Nations Urban Management Programme. He received the 2002 Dubai International Awards for Best Practices.

Celso Daniel's murder has not been properly solved by the local authorities, and the conclusions obtained by the investigations are still under dispute; the criminals who kidnapped him have been arrested but theories about their motivation for the crime vary from suggestions that it was a botched kidnapping attempt caused by a misunderstanding of the mayor's identity to conspiracy theories that the crime was politically motivated and the killers were actually paid by figures of Daniel's own political party, PT. Since the beginning of the investigation, seven witnesses have been found dead. Globoplay created a documentary about him, titled "O Caso Celso Daniel" (2022).

== Kidnapping and death ==
Celso Daniel was fifty years old, when he held the office of mayor of Santo André for the third time, he was kidnapped on the night of January 18, 2002, as he was leaving a steakhouse located in the Jardins region, in São Paulo.

According to the press, the mayor was in an armored Mitsubishi Pajero, in the company of businessman Sérgio Gomes da Silva, also known as "Shadow". The car would have been chased by three other vehicles: a Santana, a Tempra and a Blazer.

The car was followed by kidnappers and, near number 393 of Rua Antônio Bezerra, in the neighborhood of Sacomã, the cars managed to block their path. Shots were fired against the tires and the glasses; Da Silva, who was the driver, said that at that moment the brakes and the transmission didn't work. The armed bandits then opened the car door, pulled the mayor out of there and took him away, while he stayed in the area and remained unscathed.

On the morning of January 20, 2002, Sunday, the body of Mayor Celso Daniel, was found with eight shots, on Estrada das Cachoeiras, in Bairro do Carmo, at kilometer 328 of the Régis Bittencourt highway (BR-116), in Juquitiba.

== Investigation ==
The Civil Police of the State of São Paulo completed the investigation into the death of Celso Daniel on April 1, 2002. According to the final police report, presented by Delegado Armando de Oliveira Costa Filho, from the Department of Homicide and Personal Protection (DHPP), six people from a gang in the Pantanal favela, in the South Zone of São Paulo, committed the crime. Among them was a minor, who confessed to having been the author of the shots that hit the mayor. The police investigation concluded that the criminals kidnapped Celso Daniel by chance, frustrated by losing sight of their target, a businessman whose identity was not revealed. They had mistaken him for a different person, a businessman whose identity was not revealed, supposedly the true target of the kidnapping.

The member of the criminal band were identified as: Rodolfo Rodrigo de Souza Oliveira (Bozinho), José Édson da Silva (Édson), Itamar Messias Silva dos Santos (Itamar), Marcos Roberto Bispo dos Santos (Marquinhos), and Elcyd Oliveira Brito (John). The leader of the group was identified as Ivan Rodrigues da Silva (Monstro, "Monster" in Portuguese). The area of his captivity was chosen by Édson, who had rented a spot in the city of Juquitiba for this purpose. Two cars were stolen for the kidnapping, a Chevrolet S-10 Blazer and a Volkswagen Santana. The gang assembled on January 17, 2002, and decided that the kidnapping would take place the following day.

On January 18, in the afternoon, the operation began. Monstro and Marquinhos left on the Santana and the other criminals went on the Blazer. Through a cell phone, the Monster coordinated all the action. The perpetrators on the Blazer began to pursue the merchant they intended to arrest, however they lost sight of him. The leader of the gang, Monstro, then ordered the group to abort the action and attack the passenger of the first imported car that was found on the way.

The group began to pursue the vehicle and eventually crashed into it. Itamar and Bonzinho exited their car firing at the Pajero and grabbed Celso Daniel from the car. He was then taken to the Pantanal favela, between Diadema and São Paulo. In the favela, the criminals took Daniel out of the Blazer, placed him in the Santana and drove him to their planned captivity spot in Juquitiba. The bandits began to travel through the streets of the region and Monstro chose the Pajero as a new target, where Mayor Celso Daniel and businessman Sérgio Gomes were traveling. The gang began chasing the mayor's Pajero, using the Blazer to ram into the back of the Pajero. Until Itamar and Bonzinho got out of the Blazer, fired in the direction of the Pajero and pulled Mayor Celso Daniel out of the car, surrendered by force. He was taken to Favela Pantanal, on the border between Diadema and São Paulo. In the favela, the bandits removed Celso Daniel from the Blazer, put him in the Santana and took him to prison in Juquitiba.

On January 19, the criminals learned from the newspapers that they had kidnapped the mayor of Santo André. They got scared and decided to give up. Monster ordered Edson to have the victim "dismissed". According to the other members of the gang, Monstro meant by that that Celso Daniel should be freed. However, Edson understood that he should kill the mayor. Edson hired a minor known as "Lalo" to kill the victim. Edson, Lalo and Celso Daniel went to Cachoeira road, in Juquitiba, and Edson gave the order for Lalo to kill the mayor. Two days later, Celso Daniel's body was found, with eight bullet holes.

Celso Daniel's family was not satisfied with the result of the first police investigation, which said that the mayor was the victim of a common crime, mistakenly murdered by a gang of kidnappers. For the mayor's family, the crime was politically motivated. Celso Daniel's brother, João Francisco Daniel, who said that José Dirceu would have received money from bribes, recanted in 2006 after Dirceu filed a lawsuit for moral damages and said that he only wanted to see his brother's murder solved.

Businessman Sérgio Gomes da Silva, who was the driver of the Pajero where Mayor Celso Daniel was traveling, said that, when he was closed by the bandits, the lock and the gearshift of the vehicle did not work, which made it impossible to escape and allowed the bandits to open the car door and take the mayor. An expert analysis was carried out on the Pajero and the experts' conclusion is that the car had no electrical or mechanical defect that would justify a failure. According to experts, if there was a failure at the time, it was human.

One of the prosecutors in the case showed the minor who claimed to have shot the mayor a photo of Celso Daniel. He was unable to recognize the person in the photo, and the hypothesis that he was the author of the shots that killed Celso Daniel was called into question.

The family put pressure on the authorities to have the case of the mayor's death reopened. On August 5, 2002, the Public Ministry of São Paulo requested the reopening of investigations into the kidnapping and murder of the mayor.

In August 2010, prosecutor Eliana Vendramini, responsible for the investigation and complaint that investigates the murder of former mayor Celso Daniel, suffered a car accident on an expressway in São Paulo. The armored vehicle driven by the prosecutor overturned three times after being repeatedly hit by another car, which fled without providing assistance.

=== Suspicious deaths of people connected to the case ===
After the death of Celso Daniel, seven other people were murdered, all in mysterious situations. However, in an interview given in April 2016, retired police chief Marcos Carneiro Lima, who worked in the Anti-Kidnapping Division between the 1990s and 2000s, and was a general police officer in São Paulo, ruled out that such deaths could be politically motivated.

- Dionísio Aquino Severo – Celso Daniel's kidnapper and one of the main witnesses in the case. A rival faction killed him three months after the crime.
- Sérgio 'Orelha' – He hid Dionísio at home after the kidnapping. Shot in November 2002.
- Otávio Mercier – Civil Police Investigator. He telephoned Dionysius on the eve of Daniel's death. Shot dead in his home.
- Antonio Palácio de Oliveira – The waiter who served Celso Daniel on the night of the crime shortly before the kidnapping. In February 2003.
- Paulo Henrique Brito – Witnessed the death of the waiter. Got shot 20 days later.
- Iran Moraes Redua – The undertaker who recognized the mayor's body lying on the road and who called the police in Juquitiba, died of two gunshots in November 2004.
- Carlos Delmonte Printes – Coroner who attested torture marks on Celso Daniel's corpse, was found dead in his office in São Paulo, on October 12, 2005.
- Manuel Sérgio Estevam, Sérgio Orelha – Friend of Dionízio, with whom he shared a cell in the Avaré Penitentiary. Sérgio sheltered Dionízio in his apartment as soon as he escaped from prison. Orelha would be assassinated in September 2002.

Businessman Sérgio Gomes da Silva, known as "Shadow", one of the main people involved in the crime, died of cancer on September 27, 2016, in the city of São Paulo.

== Hypothesis of a political crime ==
Many members of the dead mayor's family believe in the hypothesis of political crime. According to Celso Daniel's brother, the ophthalmologist João Francisco Daniel, the mayor died because he had a file on corruption in the Santo André city hall. This hypothesis is questioned by many, since João Francisco, affiliated to the Brazilian Labor Party (PTB), opposed his brother, with whom he was personally and politically broken. Bruno Daniel, the brother who most frequently comes forward to demand that the hypothesis of a political crime be further investigated, has already explained that he never accused members of the PT of being the masterminds of the crime.

João alleges that his brother, when he was mayor of Santo André, knew and was colluding in a corruption scheme in the city hall, which served to divert money to the Workers' Party. The alleged scheme would involve members of the municipal government and businessmen from the transport sector and would also count on the participation of José Dirceu.

Bus operators in the ABC Paulista region, such as the Gabrilli family, which controls Viação São José / Expresso Guarará, confirmed that Sérgio Gomes da Silva, known as Sombra, collected a monthly bribe from companies, with amounts ranging from R$40,000 to BRL 120 thousand. Still according to these complaints, the companies that participated in the alleged scheme would benefit in Santo André. The daughter of the owner of Viação São José/Expresso Guarará, Ângela Gabrilli, told in a statement to the Special Action Group for the Repression of Organized Crime (GAECO), of the Public Ministry of Santo André, and to the CPI of the City Councilde Santo André, carried out shortly after Celso Daniel's death, that Viação Padroeira, which supposedly participated in the aforementioned scheme, won the concession of a line, the B 47 R (Jardim Santo André/Terminal Santo André Oeste), harming the Viação São José which maintained a line with a similar itinerary. The Viação Padroeira line ended up causing São José to extinguish the oldest line, the T 45 (Vila Suiça/Santo André Station) and incur losses. Until then, Viação São José did not participate in the alleged scheme.

The accused deny the allegations and have been defending themselves in the appropriate forums. Still according to the testimony of Celso's brother, João Francisco Daniel, some people started diverting the money to their personal accounts, which in turn was already illegally diverted to the PT. Celso Daniel discovered this and prepared a dossier, which would have disappeared after his murder.

Inmate José Felício, known as "Geleião", told police he had heard about Celso Daniel's dossier and a death threat. Businessman Sérgio Gomes da Silva (the "Shadow"), who was driving the car in which the mayor was traveling on the night of the kidnapping, was indicted by the Public Ministry of São Paulo, accused of being the person who ordered the mayor's murder. According to the Public Prosecutor's Office, it was Sombra who ordered the mayor's death so that an alleged corruption scheme in Santo André's city hall would not be discovered. Sombra was arrested and denies any participation in the mayor's death.

Prosecutors Roberto Wider Filho and Amaro José Tomé, from the Gaeco of the Public Ministry of Santo André, asked in 2005 for the reopening of police investigations. By order of the Secretary of Security of the State of São Paulo, Saulo de Castro Abreu Filho, the case was referred to the police chief Elisabete Sato, then head of Police District number 78, in Jardins. Prosecutors asked that the case not be forwarded again to the Department of Homicide and Personal Protection (DHPP) of the São Paulo Civil Police., who had already concluded by the thesis of common crime. Even after the investigations were reopened, the general delegate at the time, Marco Antônio Desgualdo, declared that he believed in the thesis of common crime, which is vehemently denied by prosecutors and Celso Daniel's family.

A second inquiry, conducted again by the chief delegate of the 78th DP, Elizabete Sato, indicated by the then secretary Saulo de Abreu, opened in the second half of 2005, amidst the turmoil of the CPMI dos Bingos, the so-called "CPI of the End of the World " . Elizabete was assigned by the Security Secretariat to investigate complaints from the disaffected brothers of the mayor, João Francisco and Bruno. Elizabete Sato forwarded a five-page report on the case to the Justice and Public Ministry, with the conclusion that the crime was not politically motivated. The survey, dated September 26, 2006, predates the first round of presidential elections. Its impact in the mediaonly happened at the end of November 2006.

The delegate heard the seven gunmen arrested on charges of having been the mayor's executioners. Again they confessed to the crime. What was new was that one of the accused had admitted to being responsible for the eight shots that killed the mayor. Lalo, fifteen years old at the time of the crime, said he had shot José Edson da Silva, Zé Edson, "by order and coercion", "he was indeed the main executor of the crime and an individual who exudes violence and lack of commitment to human life", according to the report.

Seven years later, the Justice had still not concluded the hearings of defense witnesses of the eight accused of the homicide. The prediction was that, when this phase was completed, if the Justice recognized that there was sufficient evidence that the defendants were the perpetrators, it would submit the case to the final judgment in the jury court. Otherwise, the Judiciary could close the process.

Investigations into the death of Celso Daniel gained new elements in 2012 with the testimony of Marcos Valério, operator of the monthly allowance, in a trial before the Federal Supreme Court. Marcos Valério told the Attorney General's Office, trying to sign a plea agreement, that former President Lula and former Minister Gilberto Carvalho were being extorted by a criminal involved in the case. The reason would be a bribe collection scheme existing in Santo André city hall, which was administered by Celso Daniel.

In 2019, a new complaint was made by Marcos Valério, who accused, through rumors, former president Luiz Inácio Lula da Silva of being one of the masterminds of the murder. The prosecutor responsible for investigating the murder, Roberto Wider Filho, denied having heard this accusation from Valério, and GAECO itself also rejected this version. Referring to the rumors, political scientist Andre Pagliarini stated in 2025: "For decades, Daniel's murder has been the subject of often absurd conspiracy theories by critics of the PT".

== See also ==
- Antonio da Costa Santos
- Corruption in Brazil
- List of kidnappings

Political offices
Preceded by Newton Brandão	18th and 20th Mayor of Santo André; 1989–1993; 1997–2002	Succeeded by Newton Brandão
Preceded by Newton Brandão	18th and 20th Mayor of Santo André; 1989–1993; 1997–2002	Succeeded by João Avamileno
