= Jack Bowles (businessman) =

French businessman

- Born: Jack Marie Henry David Bowles; July 1963 (age 62); France
- Occupation: Businessman
- Title: former CEO, British American Tobacco
- Term: April 2019 – May 2023
- Predecessor: Nicandro Durante
- Successor: Tadeu Marroco
- Board member of: British American Tobacco
- Spouse: Christine Junge Bowles
- Children: 3

Jack Marie Henry David Bowles is a French businessman, and was chief executive (CEO) of British American Tobacco (BAT) from 2019 to 2023.

Bowles was born in France. He was educated at IPAG Business School, Paris, France.

Bowles joined BAT in 2004 as head of their French business and later became head of the Malaysian business, before becoming chief operating officer (COO) in 2017.

In September 2018, it was announced that Bowles would succeed Nicandro Durante as CEO from April 2019. On 15 May 2023, in an unexpected move, BAT announced that Bowles would be stepping down as CEO with immediate effect, to be succeeded by the company's CFO Tadeu Marroco.

Bowles is married, with three children. He is a keen scuba diver.
