= IPAG Business School =

French business school

Coordinates: 48°51′15.998″N 2°19′52.541″E

- Motto: Going beyond together
- Type: Business School
- Established: 1965
- Dean: Thierry Tron Lozai
- Students: 3000
- Location: Paris, Nice, Los Angeles, Kunming, France
- Affiliations: CGE, UGEI
- Website: ipag.edu

The IPAG Business School (formerly Institut de préparation à l’administration et à la gestion) is a French private business school founded in 1965 by Jacques Rueff. It is located in Paris, Nice, Los Angeles and Kunming.

== Research ==
The IPAG Lab, created in 2009 by Frédéric Teulon, is the research center of the IPAG Business School and as of 2017 was among the best French laboratories in economics according to the RePEc ranking and the Shanghai ranking.

In 2014, an article by l'Etudiant examines IPAG's research policy and the controversy surrounding it in the field of management teachers and researchers.

== Notable alumni ==
- Inés Arrimadas, Spanish lawyer and politician
- Jack Bowles, French businessman
