= Faculdade de Direito de São Bernardo do Campo =

Law school in Sao Bernardo do Campo, Brazil

Coordinates: 23.6891°S 46.5579°W

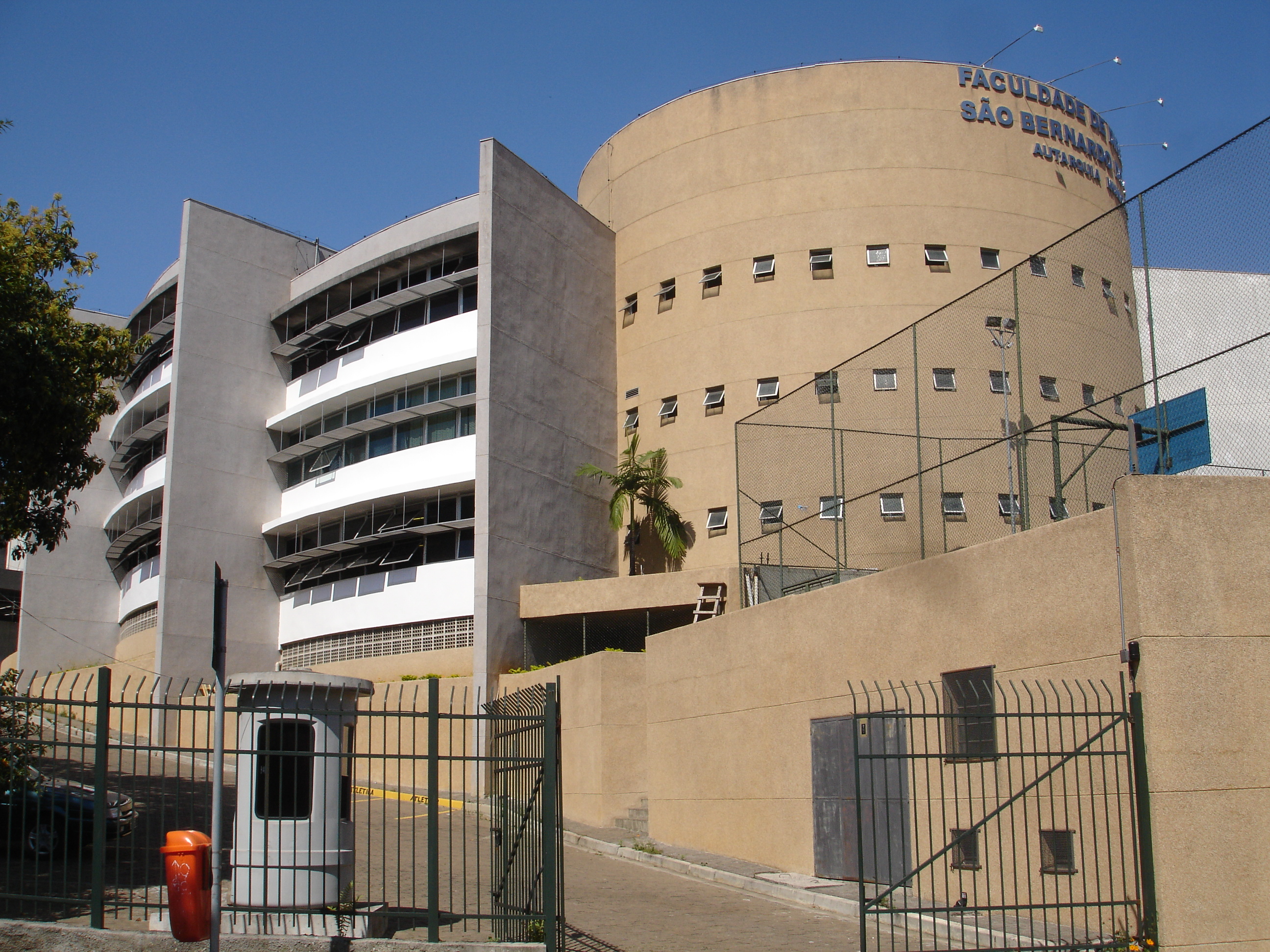
São Bernardo do Campo School of Law

São Bernardo do Campo School of Law (in Portuguese: Faculdade de Direito de São Bernardo do Campo (FDSBC), also known as "Direito São Bernardo") is a public institution of higher education located in São Bernardo do Campo. As of 2019, it had the fourth best public undergraduate law program in the state of São Paulo.

== History ==
Created by the Municipal Law nº 1.246/1964, the São Bernardo do Campo School of Law was built in the district of Jardim do Mar, in São Bernardo do Campo. The admission exam, called vestibular, is the same of the Pontifical Catholic University of São Paulo.
