= Rui Falcão =

Brazilian politician (born 1943)

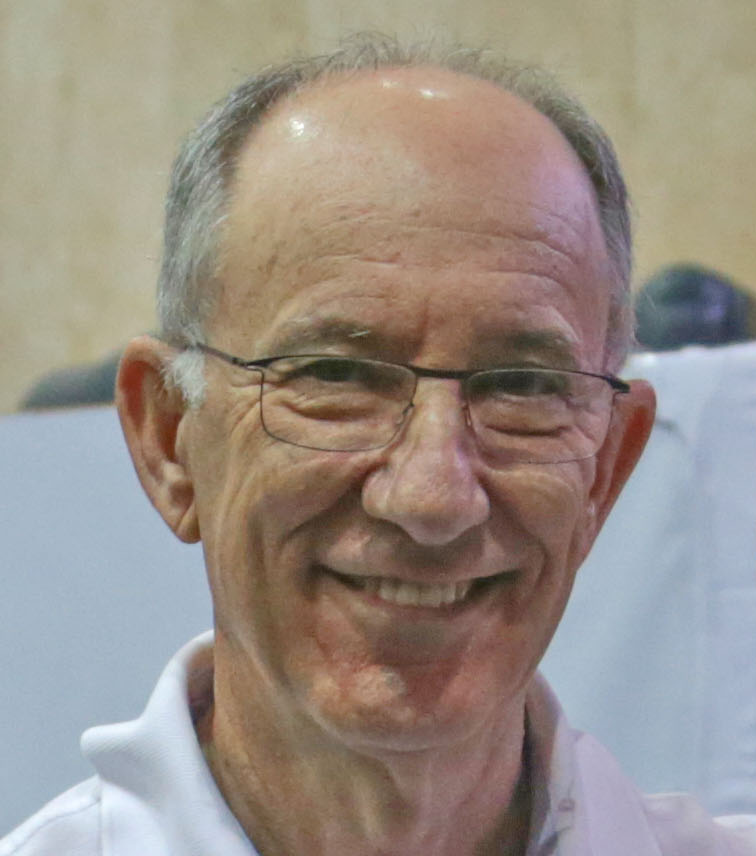

Federal Deputy for São Paulo
- Incumbent
- Assumed office 1 February 2019

National President of the Workers' Party
- In office 29 April 2011 – 3 June 2017
- Preceded by: José Eduardo Dutra
- Succeeded by: Gleisi Hoffmann
- In office 24 January 1994 – 29 October 1995
- Preceded by: Luiz Inácio Lula da Silva
- Succeeded by: José Dirceu

State Deputy of São Paulo
- In office 15 March 2007 – 15 March 2015
- In office 15 March 1991 – 15 March 1999

Personal details
- Born: 26 November 1943 (age 82) Pitangui, Minas Gerais, Brazil
- Party: Workers' Party
- Education: University of São Paulo

Rui Goethe da Costa Falcão (Brazilian Portuguese: [ˈʁuj fawˈkɐ̃w]; born 26 November 1943, in Pitangui) is a Brazilian politician, former president of the Workers' Party (Partido dos Trabalhadores) and current Federal Deputy representing the state of São Paulo. He also served as the President of the Workers' Party in 1994 and was elected again president of the party to the terms 2011–2013, 2013-2015 and 2015–2017. Preceded senator Gleisi Hoffmann, who took office on 3 June 2017. He was the Secretary of Government of São Paulo during Marta Suplicy's administration.

Party political offices
Preceded by Luiz Inácio Lula da Silva	President of the Workers' Party; 1994–1995; 2011–2017	Succeeded by José Dirceu
Preceded by José Eduardo Dutra	President of the Workers' Party; 1994–1995; 2011–2017	Succeeded by Gleisi Hoffmann
