= Nicandro Durante =

Brazilian businessman

- Born: 13 September 1956 (age 69); São Paulo, Brazil
- Education: Pontifícia Universidade Católica de São Paulo
- Occupation: Businessman
- Years active: 1977–present
- Title: CEO, British American Tobacco
- Term: 2011–2019
- Predecessor: Paul Adams
- Successor: Jack Bowles
- Children: 2

Nicandro Durante (born 13 September 1956) is a Brazilian business executive who served as the chief executive officer (CEO) of British American Tobacco (BAT), the world's largest tobacco company by sales, from 2011 to 2019. In September 2022 he was appointed as temporary CEO of Reckitt Benckiser.

== Early life ==
Durante was born in São Paulo, Brazil, to Italian parents. He went on to earn a bachelor's degree in finance, economics and business administration from the Pontifícia Universidade Católica de São Paulo.

== Career ==
Durante joined BAT's Brazilian subsidiary Souza Cruz in 1981. In January 2008, he was appointed BAT's chief operating officer (COO), and in March 2011 became the company's first non-British CEO. During his initial tenure as CEO, BAT's shares began to climb in value, and had doubled in price by 2016. However, in 2018 BAT's share price collapsed, returning to levels last seen in 2011; it appeared that Durante had misjudged the FDA's attitude towards menthol cigarettes, and that BAT had overpaid in the acquisition of the Reynolds American tobacco company minority interest in July 2017. At the time, this amounted to the largest foreign investment ever made in a US firm, costing $49 billion and "creating the world's biggest listed tobacco company". In December 2023, the Reynolds American asset was impaired by BAT for $31m USD; concrete evidence of the over payment when Durante was at the helm of BAT.

In 2015, Durante reportedly earned almost £8 million as CEO of BAT. In 2016, he asked for his salary to be raised to £10 million, claiming that he deserved another £2 million.

In late 2018, BAT announced that Durante would retire at the end of March 2019. His retirement came at a highly controversial time in the firm's history.

In September 2022, it was announced that Durante had been appointed as temporary CEO of Reckitt Benckiser, the Anglo-Dutch multinational consumer goods company, after the unexpected resignation of former CEO Laxman Narasimhan. Durante joined Reckitt's board of directors in 2013, and was its senior independent director prior to becoming CEO.

== Personal life ==
Durante enjoys smoking cigars, the opera, running and playing football and tennis. He also enjoys travelling and "fine Italian food". He is married with two children.
