= Sílvio Pereira =

Brazilian sociologist and politician

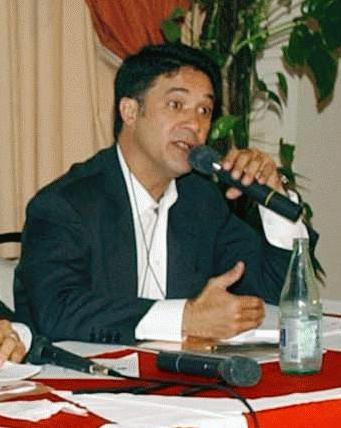
Silvio Pereira

Silvio José Pereira (born May 4, 1961) is a sociologist and co-founder of the Brazilian Workers Party. Born in Osasco, São Paulo, he was a key figure in the mensalão scandal and resigned from his post of secretary general of the party on June 4, 2005.

Under Luiz Inácio Lula da Silva's administration, Pereira was responsible for the allocation of the 32,000 commissioned positions.

== Operation Car Wash ==
The 27th phase of the Operation Car Wash (Lava Jato) uncovered Pereira's involvement in the oil corruption scheme linked to Petrobras through his company DNP Eventos Ltds. The investigation revealed that he was one of the recipient of payments from GDK and OAS contractors in the scheme that involved overpaying contracts so that excess funds are funneled to personal accounts. For example, he was accused of receiving a Land Rover from a supplier of Petrobras and of receiving, together with other leading members of the party, illegal withdrawals from the accounts of Marcos Valério. Pereira also allegedly gained favors from OAS and GDK for appointing Renato Duque to the Petrobras Services directorate.

Brazil's Federal Public Prosecution Service charged Pereira with passive corruption and money laundering and was arrested in April 2016.
