= Douglas Belchior =

Brazilian teacher and activist (born 1978)

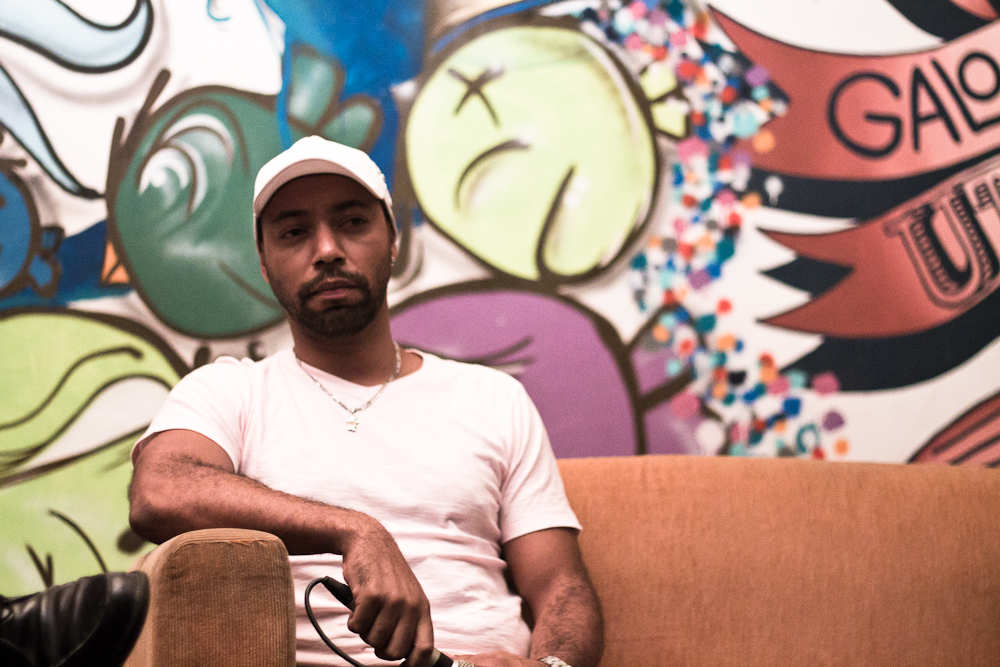
- Born: November 24, 1978 (age 47)
- Occupation: Activist

Douglas Belchior (born November 24, 1978) is a Brazilian activist.

== Early life ==
Douglas Belchior, also known as Negro Belchior, was born on November 24, 1978, in São Paulo, Brazil. Belchior spent much of his childhood along the border of Itaim Paulista, a district of São Paulo located in southeastern Brazil. Hailing from an impoverished family, Belchior began working at the age of eight as an ice cream vendor at a train station. He later ran a candy stand before becoming a child guard at a factory at the age of thirteen. He went on to intern at the company's personnel department, rising up to run the company club. He was the only Black person to work in the personnel department, a role in which “people often approached the club to make agreements and doubted that I was the one responsible.”

== Education and Career ==
Belchior's mother encouraged him to pursue his education, and he received a bachelor's degree in history from PUC-SP, the Pontifical Catholic University of São Paulo . He went on to receive a master's degree in Social and Human Sciences from the Federal University of ABC. Douglas became a volunteer History teacher and helped found the Poa Education Center in São Paulo, in addition to continuing his involvement in political activism.

As a child, Belchior first began assisting his mother with her own activism in the Catholic Church as part of a Base Ecclesial Community. Belchior received support to attend university from Educafro, an organization offering preparatory courses for college entrance exams. Upon entering school, Belchior joined numerous mobilization movements and political unions, while also enrolling in courses dealing with Black issues in Brazil. At the age of 17, he became an active member of Black and left-wing movements in Brazil. In 2009 he co-founded Uneafro Brasil, also known as the Union of Popular Education Centers for Black People and the Working Class. The organization, offering prep courses to Black and periphery people of Brazil, is dedicated to increasing access to higher education for underserved youth. The organization is deeply intertwined with numerous political movements, and is vocally anti-racist and against all forms of economic and political exploitation. Much of Belchior's activism involves increasing access to education—he shared “...education is a very powerful instrument for social mobility and for the opportunity for better living conditions.”

Belchior has made numerous attempts to run for political office in Brazil. In 2012, he ran for city councilor in Porto Alegre for the PSOL Party, also known as the Socialism and Liberty Party. After this unsuccessful election, he announced his candidacy for federal deputy before accusing PSOL of not providing equitable support to Black members following his open dialogue on the nature of racism in Brazilian politics. In 2021, following the accusation, Belchior chose to leave PSOL and return to the Workers’ Party. As part of the Workers’ Party, he announced his support for former President Luiz Inácio Lula da Silva in the 2022 Presidential election.

Belchior's activism focuses on the uplifting of Black Brazilians and the acknowledgement of the Black struggle within the country. Belchior helped found the Black Coalition for Rights, an organization seeking to mobilize Black Brazilians against state violence. During the COVID-19 pandemic, Belchior was an outspoken advocate against the poverty and food insecurity that arose in the face of the public health crisis. He is an opponent of former right-wing President Jair Bolsonaro, who he accused of being a threat to democracy and furthering police violence against Black and impoverished Brazilians. Belchior has accused the Brazilian military and corrupt officials of the Bolsonaro regime of committing a Black genocide.

== Awards ==
Belchior has received numerous awards for his advocacy in Brazil.

- Virada Sustentável/Catraca Livre (2014)
- Movimento Nacional de Direitos Humanos (2015)
- Dr. Benedicto Galvao – President of OAB-SP (2015) award
- Premio Zumbi dos Palmares (2016)
- Premio Almerinda Farias Gama (2017)
