= Pontifical Catholic University of São Paulo =

Private Catholic university in Brazil

- Pontifícia Universidade Católica de São Paulo
- Coat of arms of the university
- Other names: PUC-SP
- Motto: Sapientia et Augebitur Scientia
- Motto in English: Wisdom and Science will be increased
- Type: Pontifical, private, philanthropic and confessional
- Established: 1908 (as Faculty of Philosophy, Sciences and Languages of São Bento). 22 August 1946 (as Catholic University); 20 de janeiro de 1947 (Glorified as Pontifical by Pope Pius XII).
- Affiliations: Roman Catholic Church
- Chancellor: Cardinal Odilo Pedro Scherer
- Rector: Maria Amalia Pie Abib Andery
- Vice Rector: Fernando Antonio Almeida
- Academic staff: 1,517
- Students: 19,971
- Undergraduates: 15,766
- Postgraduates: 4,205
- Other students: 14,442 students of extension and specialization
- Location: São Paulo (headquarters) and Sorocaba, State of São Paulo, Brazil; 23.537889°S 46.671122°W
- Campus: Urban
- Colors: Blue, yellow and white
- Website: www.pucsp.br

The Pontifical Catholic University of São Paulo (Portuguese: Pontifícia Universidade Católica de São Paulo, PUC-SP), locally known as PUC or Catholic University (Universidade Católica), is a private and non-profit Catholic university. It is maintained by the Catholic Archdiocese of São Paulo. The university is also responsible for the St. Lucinda Hospital (Sorocaba) and the TUCA theatre (São Paulo).

== Overview ==
PUC-SP was the first university in Brazil to offer graduate programs in the areas of Philosophy, Multimedia, Social Service, Psychology of Learning, Applied Linguistics and Speech-language Therapy. It also was the second university to offer a bachelor's degree in International Relations, which offers "double diplôme" for selected students that can finish their studies in Sciences Po. Since 2003, PUC-SP participates in the joint graduate program in International Relations Programa San Tiago Dantas together with UNICAMP and UNESP, one of the most important graduate programs in the area in Brazil. Since 2010 it also offers a joint master's degree with Pantheon-Sorbonne University at "Economie de La Mondialisation" ("Mestrado Profissional em Economia da Mundialização e do Desenvolvimento").

Besides postgraduate programs (29 Masters and PhDs), research is also encouraged at the undergraduate level: every year the university provides almost 400 research grants (US$800/ year) for the Institutional Scientific Initiation Program (similar to the Undergraduate Research Opportunities Program in the U.S.), a national integrated system organized by the National Council for Scientific and Technological Development (CNPq) that makes research undergrad students 2,2 times more likely to achieve a master's degree and 1,51 time to became a PhD.

In 2010, 80% of employees had a college degree. In 2020, 63,3% of PUC-SP's researchers were women.

Several former professors and students have been honored with significant awards, including 2 Emmy Awards.

== History ==
=== Foundation ===
The Pontifícia Universidade Católica de São Paulo was founded in 1946, from the union of the Faculdade de Filosofia, Ciências e Letras de São Bento (School of Philosophy, Sciences and Letters of São Bento, founded in 1908) and the Paulista School of Law. Together, four other institutions of the Church were connected.

Founded by the archbishop of São Paulo, Cardinal Carlos Carmelo Vasconcellos Motta as the "Catholic University of São Paulo", the university received the title of "Pontifical Catholic University" in 1947, by the Pope Pius XII.

In 1969s, PUC-SP was the first university in Brazil to have a post-graduation course.

=== During the Military Dictatorship ===
During the Military Dictatorship in Brazil, many students and professors at PUC-SP were present in manifestations against the Government, and the archbishop at that time, Paulo Evaristo Arns, admitted teachers from the public universities who were dismissed by the militaries. Some of the persons who started working at PUC are Florestan Fernandes, Octavio Ianni, Bento Prado Jr., José Arthur Gianotti.

In 1977, PUC hosted the 29th meeting of the Sociedade Brasileira para o Progresso da Ciência (SBPC, Brazilian Society for the Progress of Science), which had been forbidden by the government in public universities. In September, some students celebrated the third National Meeting of the Students, also forbidden by the dictatorship. As a response, troops of the Military Police broke into the campus and arrested some students, professors and other workers.

In the early 1980s, PUC-SP was the first Brazilian university to elect the rector and other administrative functions by direct vote from the students and teachers. In 1984, two fires (one in September, the other in December, the latter believe to be criminal) damaged the theater of the university.

=== Financial crisis ===
In the early 2000s, two new campuses, one in Santana and one in Barueri, were created.

In 2001, the university had a deficit of 4 million reais, and that deficit increased in the following years, forcing PUC-SP to make a loan with banks, which generated a debt of 82 million reais by the end of 2005. and the results could be observed for most of the year 2006. Some courses were closed for the low demand and the several professors were fired (although some of them had accepted to have their salaries decreased to avoid being dismissed), generating protests from professors and students. By the end of 2006, the university had its first non-deficitary months.

In 2012, for the first time since the students, professors and staff have been given the right to directly elect the university's rector, the most voted candidate (Dirceu de Mello, which had already been elected for the 2008–2012 mandate and was on campaign for reelection) was not appointed for the position by Odilo Scherer, bishop-cardinal and responsible for appointing the rector. Instead, he opted for Anna Cintra, the least voted of all three candidates. She accepted the position, even though she signed a document (a gesture imitated by the other two candidates) promising not to take over unless she was the most voted candidate. The cardinal's decision was received with dissatisfaction by students and professors, who started a strike for indefinite time and did other demonstrations as an answer to Anna Cintra's indication. On 30 November, she tried to gain access to the rector's room, but was barred by the students, who surrounded her and her bodyguards and caused her to flee by taxi.

== Campuses ==
The main campus of PUC-SP and its administrative headquarters are located in Perdizes, a middle-class neighbourhood in the subprefecture of Lapa, in the west side of São Paulo City. It mostly consists of academic buildings, the University Theater (TUCA) and the University Church. Most of these buildings, built between 1920 and 1940, are part of the historical patrimonium of the city. The School of Exact Sciences and Technology is located near the city centre (Consolação Campus) while Business and Economy courses are also offered in the north side of São Paulo City (Santana Campus). The School of Medical and Health Sciences is located in the city of Sorocaba (90 km from São Paulo) and a campus in the city of Barueri offers courses of Business, Economics, Physical Therapy and Psychology.

=== Unities and courses ===
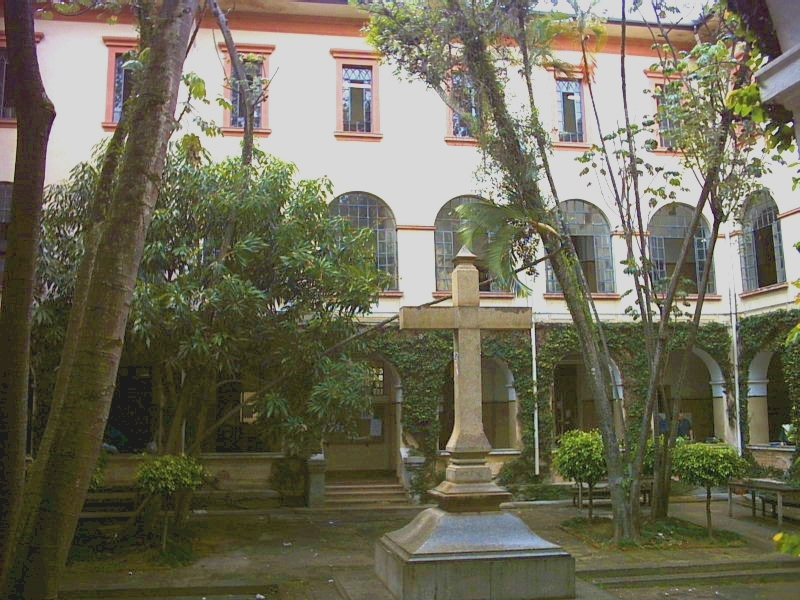
Cross Patio inside PUC-SP in campus Perdizes.

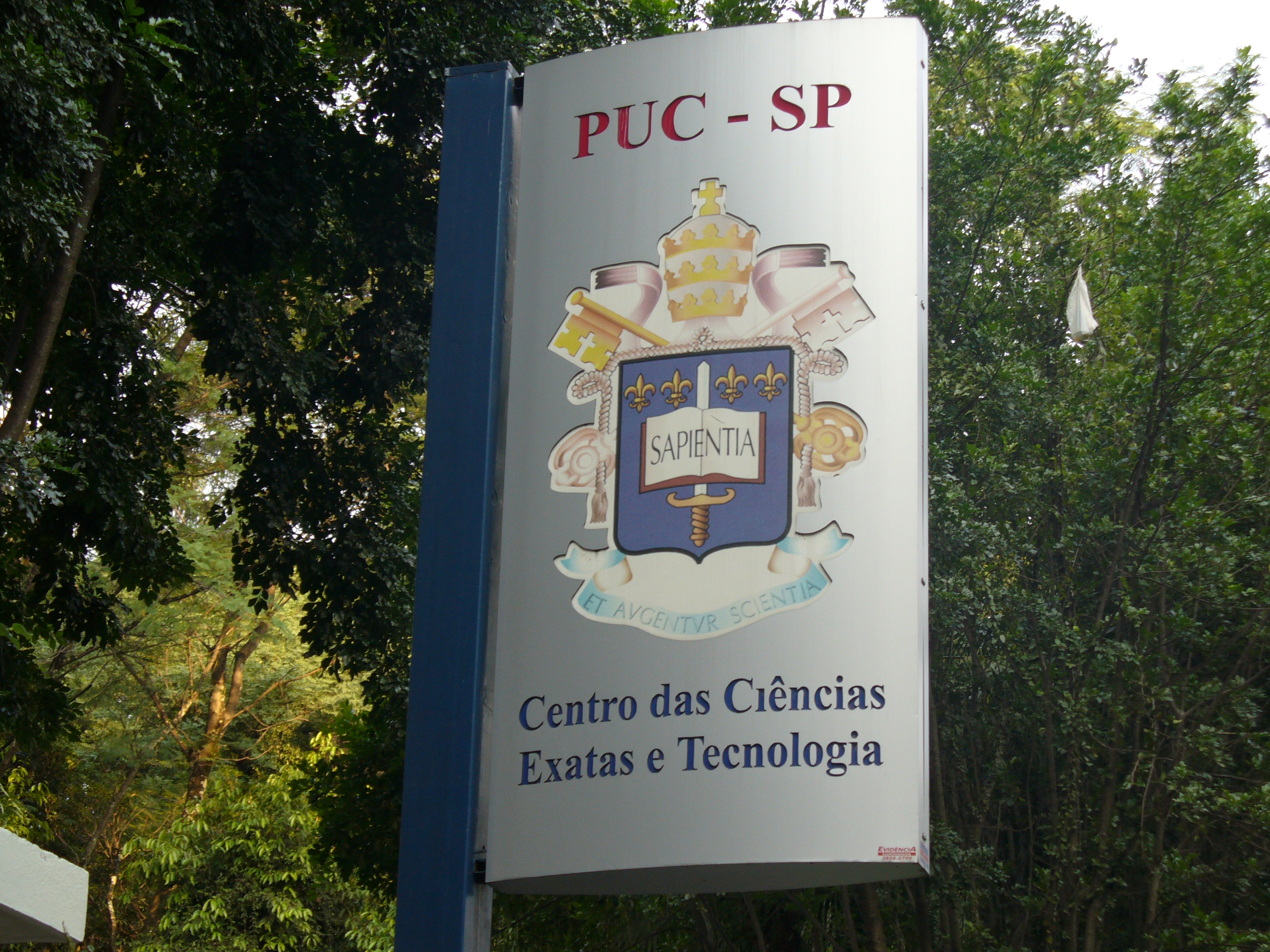
School of Exact Sciences and Technology, in 'Consolação' campus

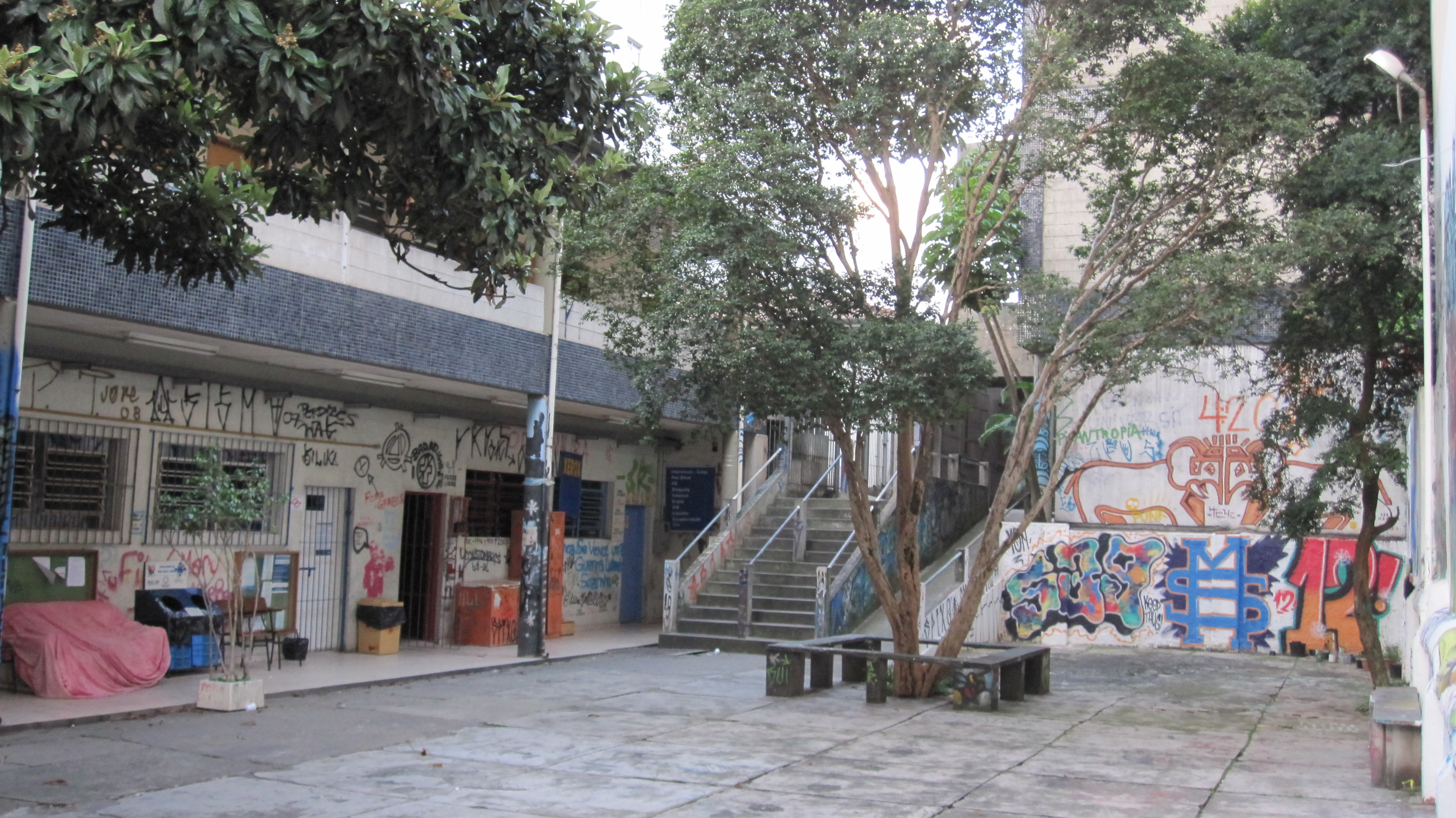
School of Philosophy, Communication, Letters and Arts of PUC-SP, located near the main campus.

Faculty	Course	Campus
School of Social Sciences	Geography	Perdizes
School of Social Sciences	History	Perdizes
School of Social Sciences	International relations	Perdizes
School of Social Sciences	Social sciences	Perdizes
School of Social Sciences	Social work	Perdizes
School of Social Sciences	Tourism	Perdizes
School of Philosophy, Communication, Letters and Arts	Art: History, Criticism and Curatorship	Consolação
School of Philosophy, Communication, Letters and Arts	Communication of the Body Arts	Perdizes
School of Philosophy, Communication, Letters and Arts	Communication in Multimedia	Perdizes
School of Philosophy, Communication, Letters and Arts	Letters: Spanish language (Licenciate)	Perdizes
School of Philosophy, Communication, Letters and Arts	Letters: English language (Bachelor)	Perdizes
School of Philosophy, Communication, Letters and Arts	Letters: English language (Licenciate)	Perdizes
School of Philosophy, Communication, Letters and Arts	Letters: French language (Licenciate)	Perdizes
School of Philosophy, Communication, Letters and Arts	Letters: Portuguese language (Licentiate)	Perdizes
School of Philosophy, Communication, Letters and Arts	Philosophy	Perdizes
School of Philosophy, Communication, Letters and Arts	Social communication: Journalism	Perdizes
School of Philosophy, Communication, Letters and Arts	Social communication: Publicity and propaganda	Perdizes
School of Philosophy, Communication, Letters and Arts	Superior of technology in Conservation-restoration	Consolação
School of Law	Law	Perdizes
School of Administration, Economics, Accountancy and Actuarial sciences	Administration	Perdizes
School of Administration, Economics, Accountancy and Actuarial sciences	Administration	Santana
School of Administration, Economics, Accountancy and Actuarial sciences	Administration	Barueri
School of Administration, Economics, Accountancy and Actuarial sciences	Actuarial sciences	Perdizes
School of Administration, Economics, Accountancy and Actuarial sciences	Accountancy	Perdizes
School of Administration, Economics, Accountancy and Actuarial sciences	Accountancy	Santana
School of Administration, Economics, Accountancy and Actuarial sciences	Economic sciences	Perdizes
School of Administration, Economics, Accountancy and Actuarial sciences	Economic sciences with emphasis in international trade	Barueri
School of Administration, Economics, Accountancy and Actuarial sciences	Superior of technology in Marketing	Santana
School of Administration, Economics, Accountancy and Actuarial sciences	Superior of technology in International trade	Santana
School of Administration, Economics, Accountancy and Actuarial sciences	Superior of technology in Environmental management	Santana
School of Human Sciences and Health	Speech therapy	Perdizes
School of Human Sciences and Health	Physical therapy	Barueri
School of Human Sciences and Health	Psychology	Perdizes
School of Human Sciences and Health	Psychology	Barueri
School of Education	Pedagogy	Perdizes
School of Education	Pedagogy	Santana
School of Exact Sciences and Technology	Biomedical engineering	Consolação
School of Exact Sciences and Technology	Civil engineering	Consolação
School of Exact Sciences and Technology	Electrical engineering	Consolação
School of Exact Sciences and Technology	Industrial engineering	Consolação
School of Exact Sciences and Technology	Computer engineering	Consolação
School of Exact Sciences and Technology	Information systems	Consolação
School of Exact Sciences and Technology	Mathematics (Licenciate)	Consolação
School of Exact Sciences and Technology	Physics (Bachelor/Licenciate)	Consolação
School of Exact Sciences and Technology	Superior of technology in Digital games	Consolação
School of Exact Sciences and Technology	Technology and Digital media	Consolação
School of Medical Sciences and Health	Biological sciences	Sorocaba
School of Medical Sciences and Health	Medicine	Sorocaba
School of Medical Sciences and Health	Nursing	Sorocaba

== Admission ==
Like other Brazilian universities, students are admitted by an entrance exam called vestibular which consists of two tests containing questions on languages, science, math and history. The vestibular of PUC-SP also selects students for other colleges and universities in the state of São Paulo (Examples: Faculty of Medicine of Marília (public institution), Faculty of Medicine of ABC and the Faculty of Law of São Bernardo do Campo).

== Notable professors and alumni ==
=== Professors ===
Economy school

- Plínio de Arruda Sampaio (1930–2014), Federal Deputy for São Paulo
- Celso Daniel (1951–2002), Mayor of Santo André
- Celso Furtado (1920–2004), Minister of Development and Minister of Culture
- Guido Mantega (1949–), Finance Minister
- Aloizio Mercadante (1954–), Senator for São Paulo

Education school

- Paulo Freire (1921–1997), critical pedagogy theorist

Law school

- Osvaldo Aranha Bandeira de Melo (1908–1980), Director of São Paulo city legal department, first lay rector of PUC-SP between 1963 and 1972, desembargador of the Court of São Paulo
- Tércio Sampaio Ferraz Júnior (1941–), philosopher of law and jurist.
- Michel Temer (1940-), President of Brazil.

Philosophy school

- Zeljko Loparić (1939–), History of Philosophy scholar
- Bento Prado Júnior (1937–2007), literary critic, writer, poet and translator
- Jeanne Marie Gagnebin (1952 – ), philosopher, History of Philosophy scholar and writer

Sociology school

- Octavio Ianni (1926–2004), populism and imperialism scholar
- Florestan Fernandes (1920–1995), Federal Deputy for São Paulo
- Maurício Tragtenberg (1929–1998), Libertarian Education exponent

Arts and Letters school

- Haroldo de Campos (1929–2003), literary critic, writer, translator and one of the most important poet of twentieth-century Brazilian poetry.

=== Alumni ===
- Gabriel Chalita, Secretary of education of the State of São Paulo
- Rafael Cortez, journalist, actor and comedian
- Rui Ricardo Dias, actor
- José Dirceu, Chief of Staff
- Nicandro Durante, Chief executive of British American Tobacco
- Luiz Fernando Furlan, Finance Minister and entrepreneur
- Reynaldo Gianecchini, actor
- Nina da Hora, computer scientist and anti-racism activist
- Maria Rita Kehl, psychoanalyst and writer
- Antonio Claudio Mariz de Oliveira, criminalist lawyer
- Monalisa Perrone, journalist of TV Globo
- Suzane von Richthofen, convicted murderer
- Amir Slama, stylist and entrepreneur
- Ulisses Soares, Apostle of The Church of Jesus Christ of Latter-Day Saints
- Marta Suplicy, psychologist, and mayor of São Paulo city
- Shigeaki Ueki, President of Petrobrás
- Douglas Belchior, activist

== See also ==
- Brazil University Rankings
- Universities and Higher Education in Brazil
