= José Genoíno =

Brazilian politician (born 1946)

José Genoino
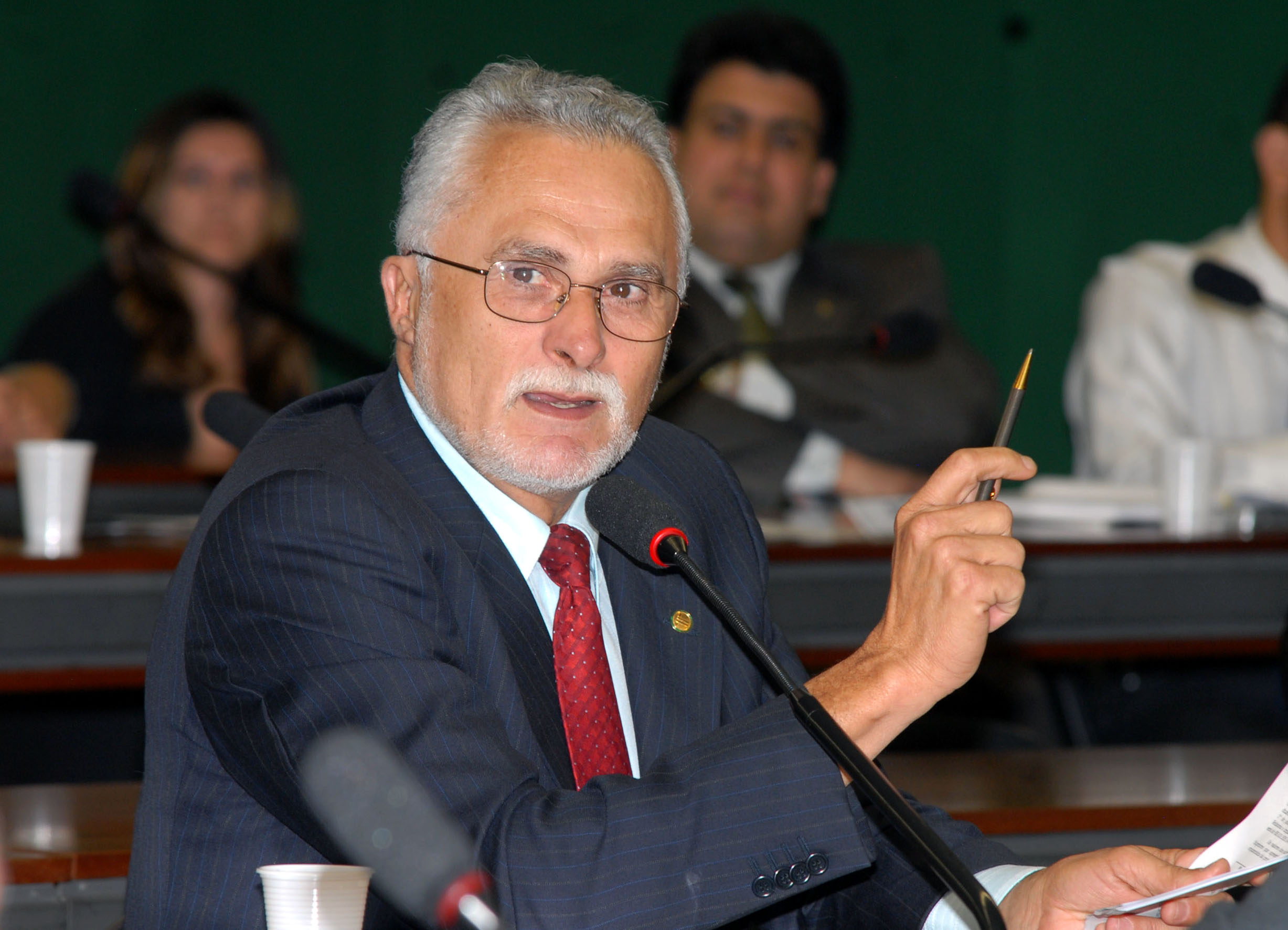

Member of the Chamber of Deputies
- In office January 3, 2013 – December 3, 2013
- Constituency: São Paulo
- In office February 1, 2007 – February 1, 2011
- Constituency: São Paulo
- In office February 1, 1983 – February 1, 2003
- Constituency: São Paulo

National President of the Workers' Party
- In office December 7, 2002 – July 9, 2005
- Preceded by: José Dirceu
- Succeeded by: Tarso Genro

Personal details
- Born: 3 May 1946 (age 80) Quixeramobim, Ceará, Brazil
- Party: Workers' Party

José Genoino Neto (born 3 May 1946) is a Brazilian politician and former guerrilla fighter.

== Biography ==
Born in Quixeramobim in the state of Ceará, he fought as a guerrilla in one of the movements against the Brazilian military leaders Artur da Costa e Silva, Emílio Garrastazu Médici and Ernesto Geisel who ruled Brazil in the seventies. Ultimately, he was given amnesty, and elected as a congressman for São Paulo, serving between 1982 and 2002. At the end of 2002, he was elected president of the Brazilian Workers Party. In 2012, he was found guilty of corruption in one of the largest corruption scandals case by the Brazilian Supreme Court and, as of 2014, is under house arrest.
