= José Dirceu =

Brazilian politician

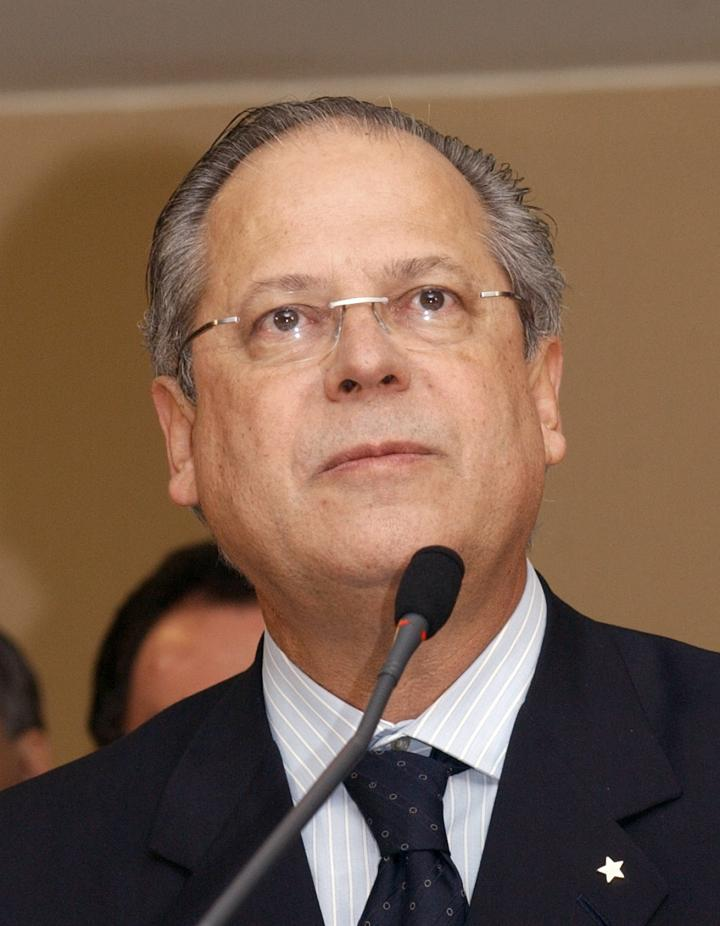

Chief of Staff of the Presidency
- In office January 1, 2003 – June 21, 2005
- President: Luiz Inácio Lula da Silva
- Preceded by: Pedro Parente
- Succeeded by: Dilma Rousseff

Member of the Chamber of Deputies
- In office February 1, 1999 – December 1, 2005
- Constituency: São Paulo
- In office February 1, 1991 – February 1, 1995
- Constituency: São Paulo

National President of the Workers' Party
- In office October 29, 1995 – December 7, 2002
- Preceded by: Rui Falcão
- Succeeded by: José Genoíno

State Deputy of São Paulo
- In office February 1, 1987 – February 1, 1991
- Constituency: At-large

Personal details
- Born: José Dirceu de Oliveira e Silva; March 16, 1946 (age 80) Passa Quatro, Minas Gerais, Brazil
- Party: PT (1980–present)
- Other political affiliations: PCB (1961–1966)
- Children: Zeca Dirceu
- Education: Pontifical Catholic University of São Paulo

José Dirceu de Oliveira e Silva (Note: Portuguese pronunciation: [ʒoˈzɛ d͡ʒiʁˈsew d͡ʒi o.liˈve(j).ɾɐ i ˈsiw.vɐ]) (born March 16, 1946) is a former Brazilian politician. His political rights were suspended by the Brazilian House of Representatives and he was found guilty by the Brazilian Supreme Court of active corruption and conspiracy in two separate lawsuits.

He participated in an armed revolutionary group after the 1964 Brazilian coup d'état, and was exiled in 1969. He returned in 1980 and was politically active, culminating in a post as chief-of-staff to Luiz Inácio Lula da Silva's administration from 2003 until his resignation due to corruption charges.

== Early life ==
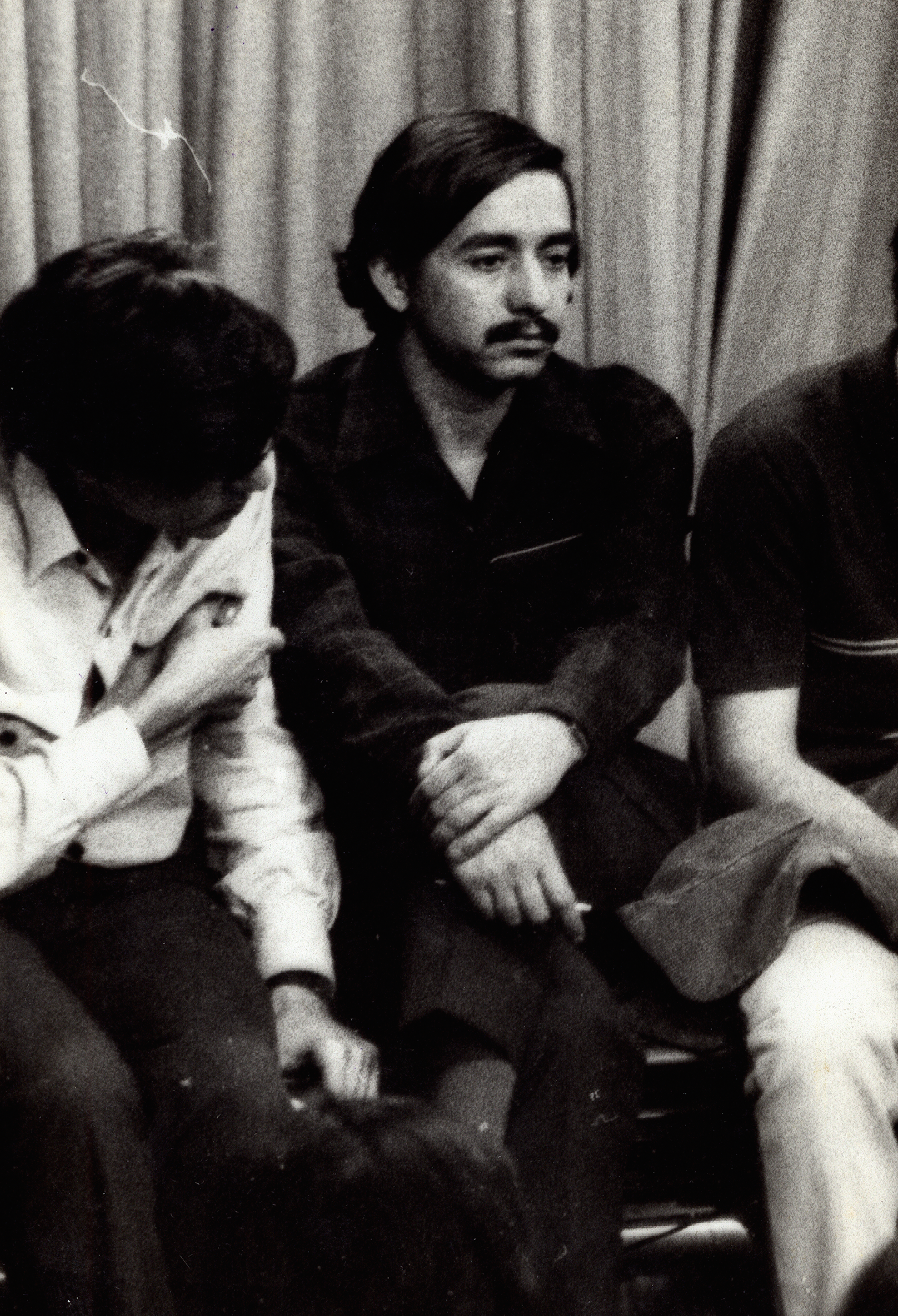
Dirceu in 1968

Dirceu moved to São Paulo in 1961 and in 1966 joined the Ala Marighella, later called the ALN, a revolutionary armed group linked to the Brazilian Communist Party. In 1968 Dirceu, known as "Daniel", was the leader of the State Union of Students (UEE). As a consequence, Dirceu was arrested on October 12, 1968, during the 30th Congress of the National Student Union (UNE), in Ibiúna.

In 1969 Marxist revolutionary groups MR8 and ALN abducted the US ambassador to Brazil, Charles Burke Elbrick. The revolutionaries demanded the liberation of fifteen prisoners, including José Dirceu. This incident is the basis of the film Four Days in September.

After that he travelled to Cuba. While in exile, Dirceu worked, received military training and studied on the island. According to him, he changed his appearance through plastic surgery. Dirceu returned to Brazil in 1975 under the false name of "Carlos Henrique Gouveia de Mello". He married his first wife and lived in Paraná in total secrecy, with his true identity unknown even to his wife, until 1979, when he returned to Cuba.

His official exile ended in 1980, after amnesty. Separated from his first wife, he married again, to the psychologist Ângela Saragosa, and assumed his real identity. The marriage to Saragosa came to an end in 1990. In 1991 he married his current wife, Maria Rita Garcia Andrade, an old friend from his militant days. He has three children.

Dirceu played an active role in the movement to grant amnesty to those tried for and convicted of political activities, as well as in the coordination of the Diretas Já campaign in 1984 in favor of direct presidential elections.

== Political career ==
With a law degree from the Pontifical Catholic University of São Paulo, he served as assemblyman from 1987 to 1991 (SP-PT) and congressman from 1991 to 1995 (SP-PT) and, again, from 1999 to 2003 (SP-PT). He was elected president of the PT in 1995 and re-elected in 1997.

Dirceu held numerous posts in the Partido dos Trabalhadores (PT), of which he is a founder, including the presidency of the National Executive between 1995 and 1997. In 1989 he coordinated first presidential campaign of Luiz Inácio Lula da Silva.

He exercised various parliamentary activities in municipal councils, state legislative assemblies, and the legislative chamber of the Federal District. Among them, he was a member of the Finance and Budget Commission and vice-president of the Public Safety Commission.

From January 1, 2003, to June 16, 2005, Dirceu was Lula's chief-of-staff. In Brazil, the chief-of-staff has a ministerial status similar to the British Cabinet Office, and Lula's presidential decree putting him in charge of all government appointments gave him more power still.

== Mensalão corruption scandal ==
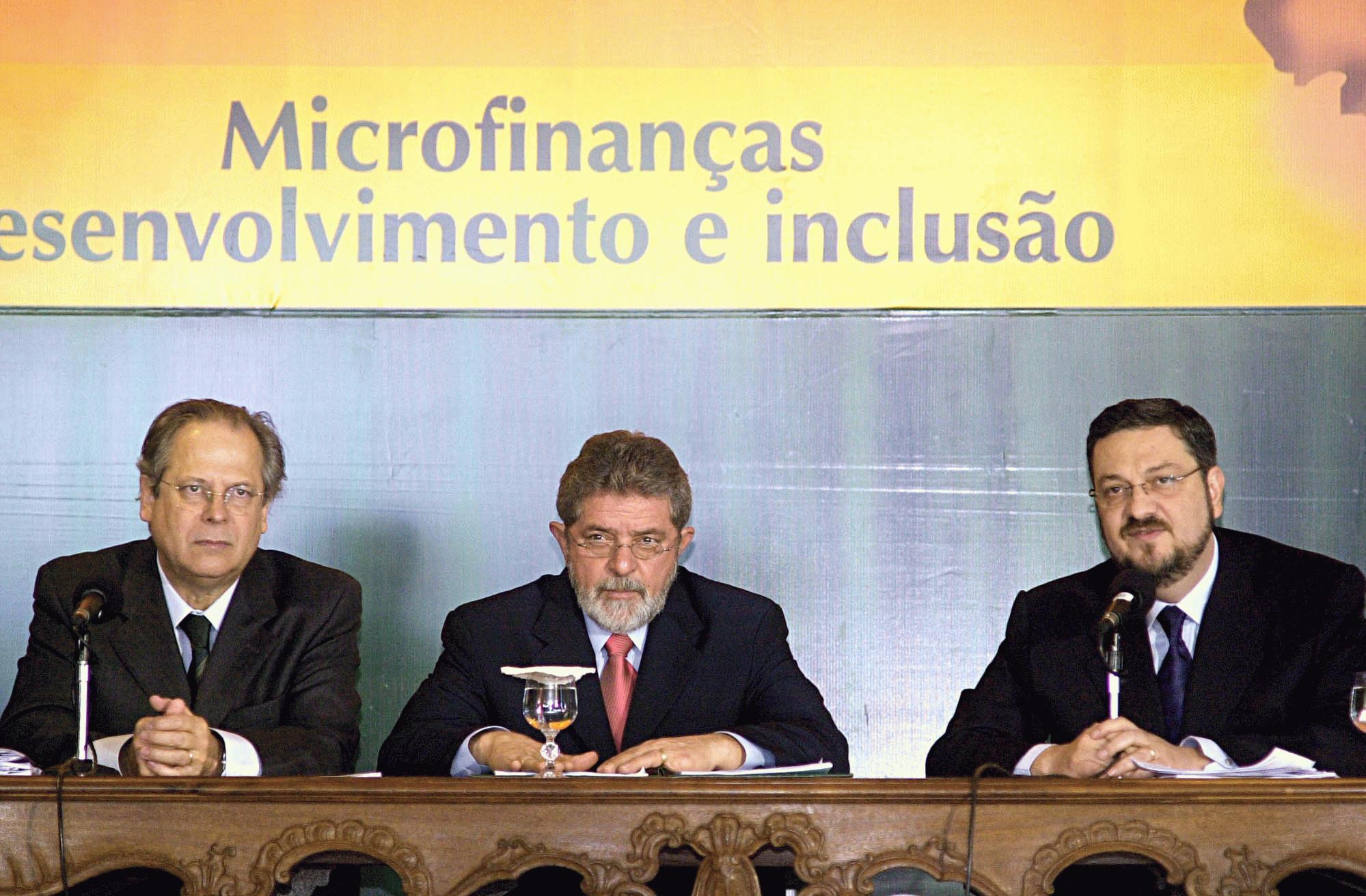
Chief of staff José Dirceu, president Lula, and finance minister Antonio Palocci, 2003

Dirceu's departure as Lula's chief-of-staff is attributed to a massive corruption scheme in the legislature, the Mensalão scandal. Upon leaving the government, Dirceu resumed his roles as an elected congressman for the state of São Paulo. He was expelled from the Congress on November 30, 2005, accused of breaching the parliamentary decorum due to his involvement with the Mensalão scandal, and barred from holding any executive or legislative positions until 2015. As of 2006, he was practicing in a law firm in Rio de Janeiro.

He was prosecuted and convicted by the Attorney General, charged with being the leader of the mensalão. He charged with of corruption, embezzlement, racketeering and money laundering, among other charges, by the Supreme Federal Tribunal in August 2012, and found guilty in October 2012. He is currently serving a 7-year sentence at the Papuda prison.

== Petrobras corruption scandal ==
On August 3, 2015, he was again arrested on suspicion of corruption and money laundering as result of the Operation Car Wash investigation. On May 18, 2016, he was found guilty and sentenced to 23 years and three months in prison. He had previously been sentenced to more than ten years' imprisonment in connection with the mensalão scandal. On May 3, 2017, an appeal court granted him bail pending appeal, which had previously been denied. The prosecutor in charge of the investigation called the decision "incoherent" and said that Dirceu's liberty posed "real risk to society". Prosecutors charged Dirceu the same day with diverting R2.4 million from Petrobras contracts with Engevix and UTC.

== Notes ==
Party political offices
Preceded by Rui Falcão	National President of the Workers' Party; 1995–2002	Succeeded by José Genoíno
Political offices
Preceded by Pedro Parente	Chief of Staff of the Presidency; 2003–2005	Succeeded by Dilma Rousseff
