= Marcos Valério =

Brazilian businessman

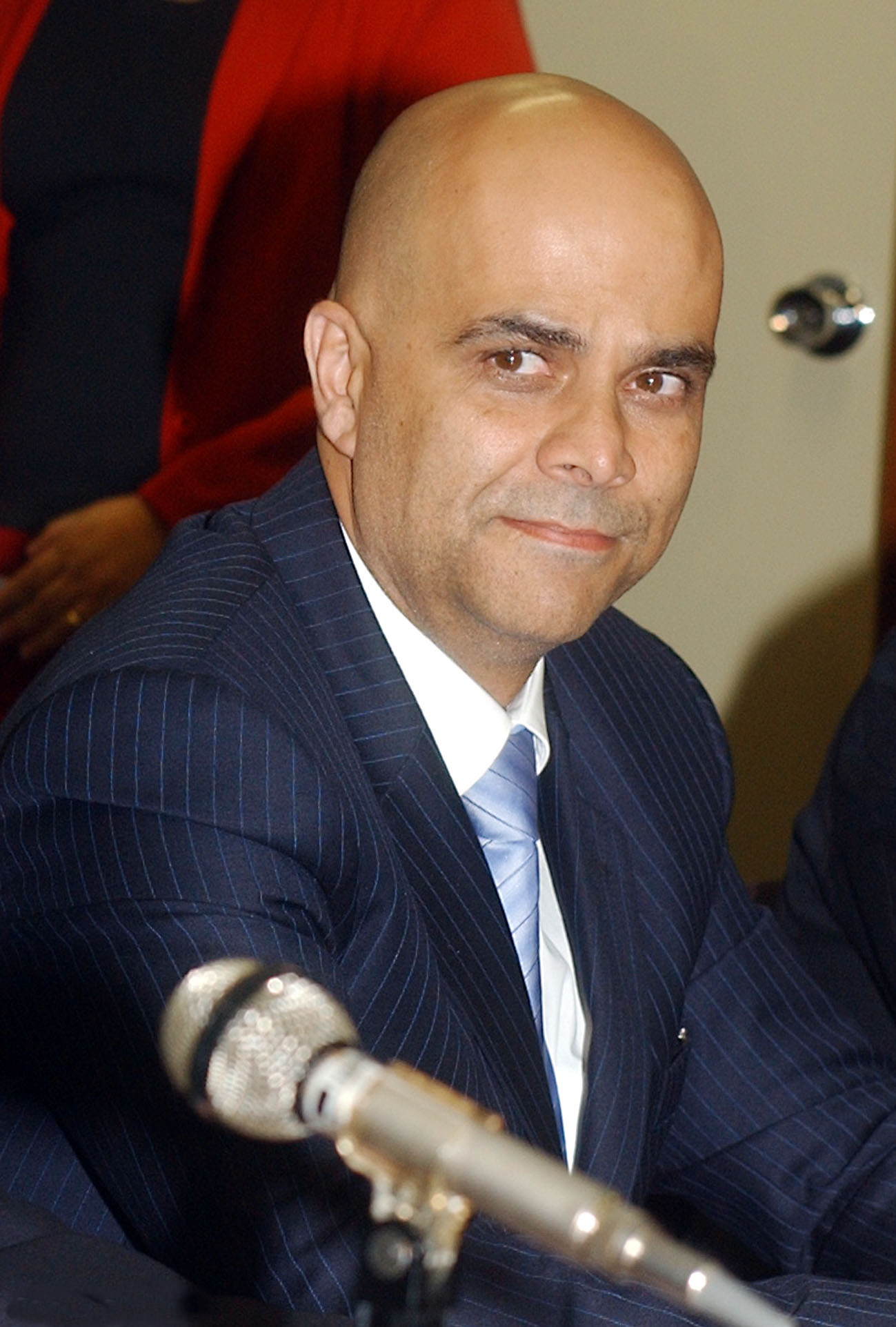
- Born: Marcos Valério Fernandes de Souza; 29 January 1961 (age 65); Curvelo, Minas Gerais, Brazil
- Occupations: Businessman and marketer
- Known for: Mensalão scandal
- Status: On parole
- Convictions: Bribery, criminal organization, embezzlement, money laundering, tax evasion
- Trial: Mensalão scandal (2 August 2012 – 18 December 2012)
- Penalty: 40 years, 4 months and 6 days in prison and fine of R$ 3 million

Marcos Valério Fernandes de Souza (born January 29, 1961) is a Brazilian businessman in the field of public relations. He is the owner of two communications firms: DNA and SMP&B. Because of his involvement in the Mensalão scandal, he was sentenced to more than 40 years of imprisonment.

== Career ==
The son of Aidê Fernandes de Souza and Adeliro Francisco de Souza, he was born on January 29, 1961, in Curvelo, Minas Gerais. He spent his early life in the northeast of Belo Horizonte.

His professional career began in the state bank of Minas Gerais, known as Bemge (bought by Banco Itaú, in 1998).

He entered the business of public relations in 1996 with a partnership with Clésio Andrade, Cristiano Paz and Ramon Cardoso with the public relations and advertising firm SMP&B. Later, he bought Andrade's stake and also bought shares of another agency, DNA.

He was one of the main accused in the Mensalão scandal and found guilty of bribery, embezzlement, money laundering, tax evasion and conspiracy. In October 2012 he was given a sentence of 40 years 2 months and 10 days imprisonment and a fine of R$2.72 million. His associates Ramon Hollerbach, Cristiano Paz and Simone Vasconcelos were sentenced to 29 years, 7 months, 20 days respectively 25 `years, 11 months, 20 days imprisonment and 12 years imprisonment.
