= 2010 São Paulo gubernatorial election =

Brazilian gubernatorial election

- 3 October 2010
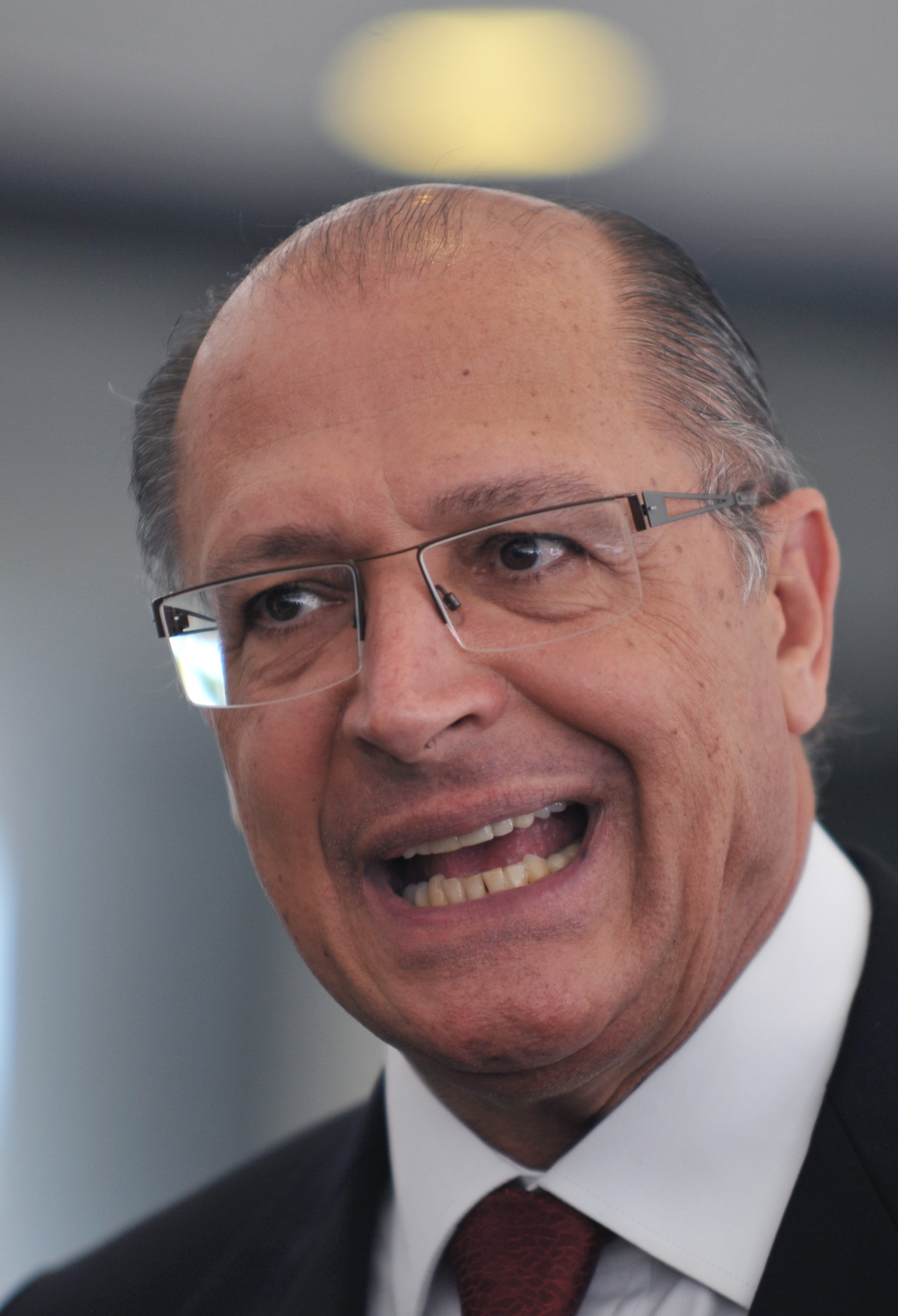

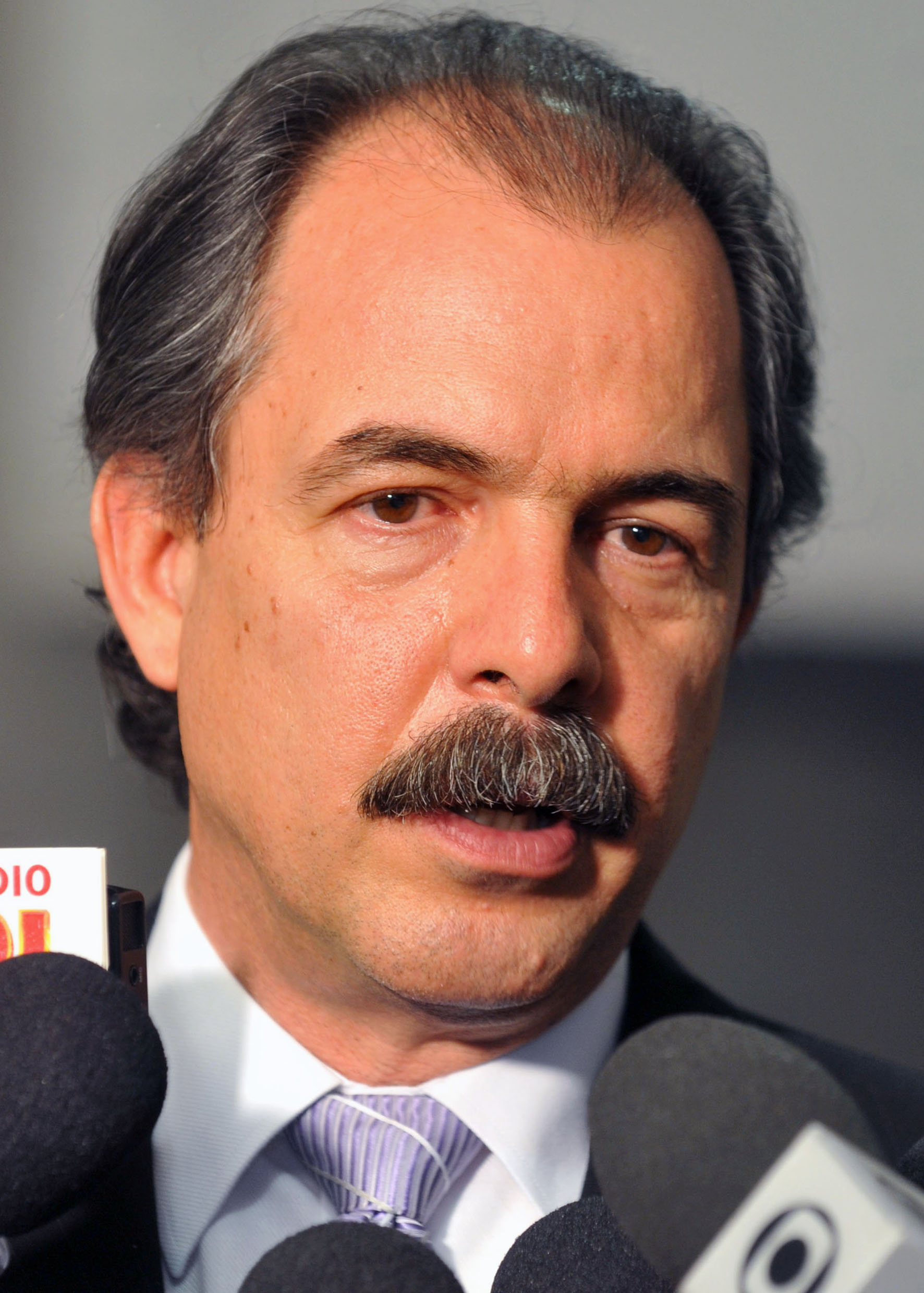
Candidate	Geraldo Alckmin	Aloizio Mercadante
Party	PSDB	PT
Alliance	United for São Paulo	Union to Change
Running mate	Afif Domingos	Coca Ferraz
Popular vote	11,519,314	8,016,866
Percentage	50.63%	35.23%
- Candidate with the most votes per municipality (645): Geraldo Alckmin (594 municipalities); Aloizio Mercadante (51 municipalities)
Governor before election
Alberto Goldman
PSDB
Elected Governor
Geraldo Alckmin
PSDB

2010 Brazilian senate election
- 3 October 2010
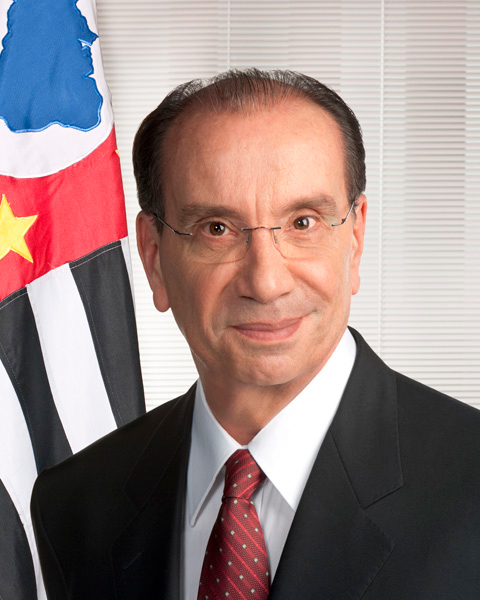

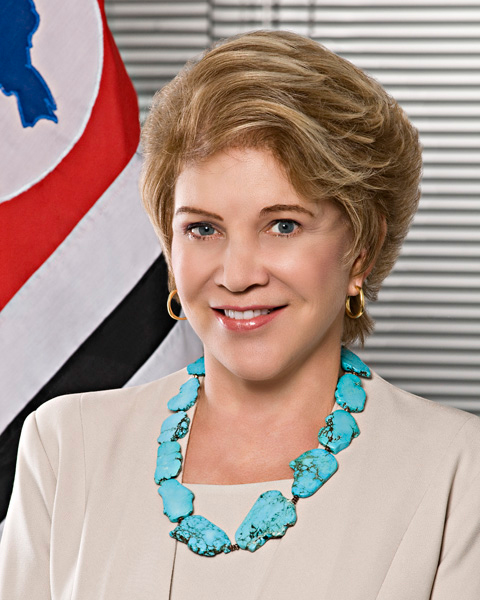

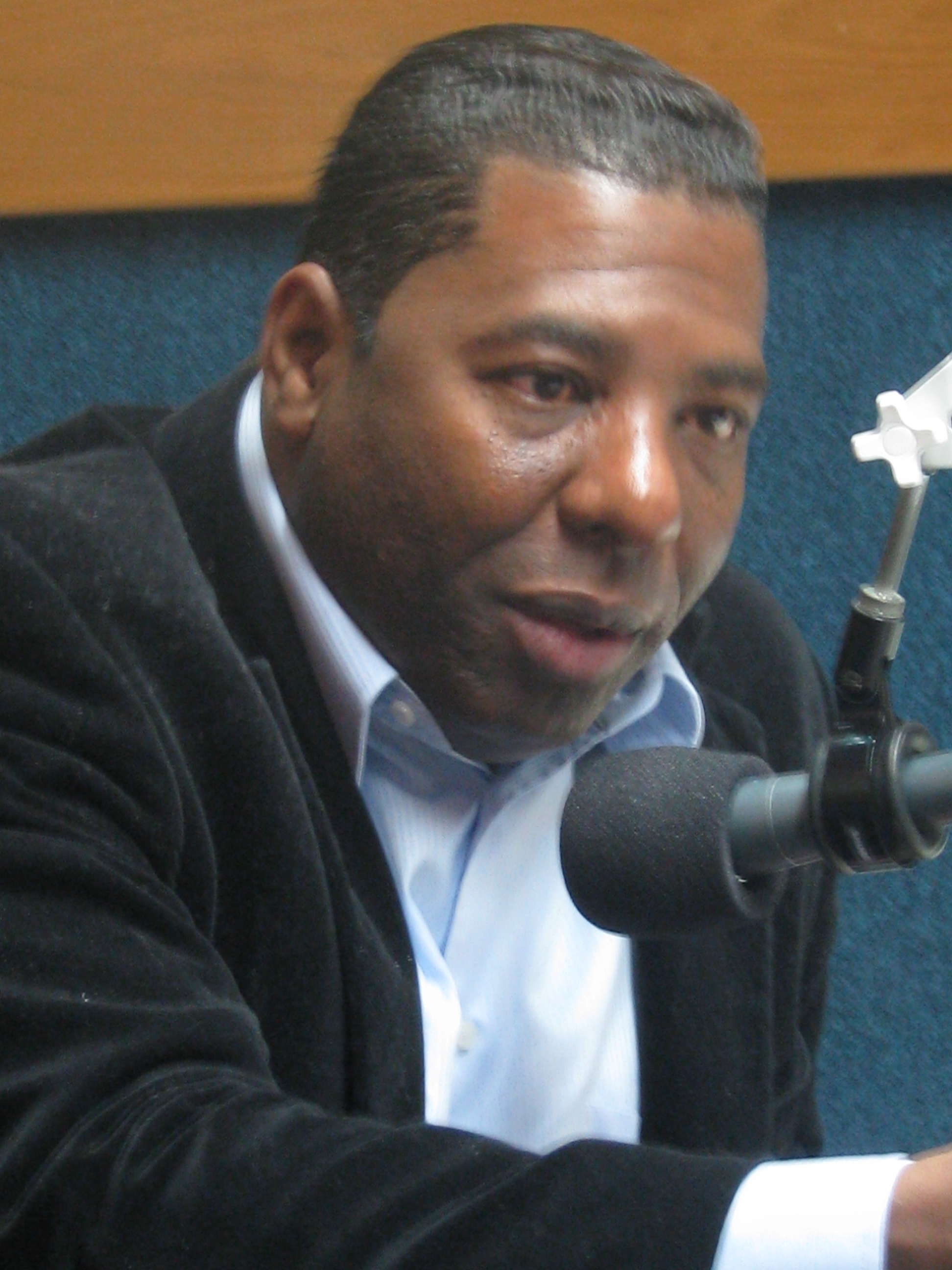
Nominee	Aloysio Nunes	Marta Suplicy	Netinho de Paula
Party	PSDB	PT	PCdoB
Alliance	United for São Paulo	Union to Change	Union to Change
Popular vote	11,189,168	8,314,027	7,773,327
Percentage	30.42%	22.61%	21.13%
Senators before election
Aloizio Mercadante, Romeu Tuma
PT, PTB
Elected Senators
Aloysio Nunes, Marta Suplicy
PSDB, PT

The state elections in São Paulo in 2010 were held on October 3 as part of the general elections in Brazil. At this time, elections were held in all 26 Brazilian states and the Federal District. Citizens eligible to vote elected the president, the governor and two senators per state, plus state and federal deputies. Since none of the candidates for governor to the presidency and some got more than half the valid votes, a runoff was held on October 31. In the presidential election was a runoff between Dilma Rousseff (PT) and José Serra (PSDB) with the victory of Dilma. In São Paulo there was no runoff for governor. Under the Federal Constitution, the President and the governors are directly elected for a term of four years, with a limit of two terms. President Luiz Inácio Lula da Silva (PT) can not be re-elected, since he was elected twice in 2002 and 2006. As Governor José Serra resigned in April to run for the presidency, Alberto Goldman (PSDB) became governor, but has not applied for the position.

The main candidates were Geraldo Alckmin (PSDB), Aloizio Mercadante (PT), Celso Russomanno (PP), Paulo Skaf (PSB), Fabio Feldmann (PV). Geraldo Alckmin (PSDB) was elected in the first round with more than 11 million votes.

== Candidates ==
=== Governor ===
Party	Candidate	Most relevant political office or occupation	Party	Running mate	Coalition	Electoral number
Progressive Party (PP)	Celso Russomanno	Member of the Chamber of Deputies (1995–2011)	Progressive Party (PP)	Marcus Vinícius de Freitas	In the Defense of the Citizen: Progressive Party (PP); Christian Labour Party (PTC)	11
Workers' Party (PT)	Aloizio Mercadante	Senator for São Paulo (2003–2011)	Democratic Labour Party (PDT)	Coca Ferraz	Union to Change: Workers' Party (PT); Democratic Labour Party (PDT); Communist Party of Brazil (PCdoB); Party of the Republic (PR); Christian Social Democratic Party (PSDC); National Labour Party (PTN); Brazilian Republican Party (PRB); Progressive Republican Party (PRP); Brazilian Labour Renewal Party (PRTB); Labour Party of Brazil (PTdoB)	13
Workers' Cause Party (PCO)	Anaí Caproni	Member of PCO National Executive and Central Committee	Workers' Cause Party (PCO)	José Dorta	—N/a	29
Brazilian Socialist Party (PSB)	Paulo Skaf	President of FIESP (2004–2021)	Brazilian Socialist Party (PSB)	Marianne Pinotti	Pay Attention São Paulo: Brazilian Socialist Party (PSB); Social Liberal Party (PSL)	40
Green Party (PV)	Fabio Feldmann	Secretary of Environment of São Paulo (1995–1998)	Green Party (PV)	Rogério Menezes	—N/a	43
Brazilian Social Democracy Party (PSDB)	Geraldo Alckmin	Governor of São Paulo (2001–2006)	Democrats (DEM)	Afif Domingos	United for São Paulo: Brazilian Social Democracy Party (PSDB); Democrats (DEM); Brazilian Democratic Movement Party (PMDB); Social Christian Party (PSC); Popular Socialist Party (PPS); Humanist Party of Solidarity (PHS); Party of National Mobilization (PMN)	45

=== Senator ===
Party	Candidate	Most relevant political office or occupation	Party	Candidates for Alternate Senators	Coalition	Electoral number
Progressive Party (PP)	Sérgio Redó	Journalist, entrepreneur, writer, university professor	Progressive Party (PP)	1st alternate senator: Luis Carlos Reis	In the Defense of the Citizen: Progressive Party (PP); Christian Labour Party (PTC)	111
Progressive Party (PP)	Sérgio Redó	Journalist, entrepreneur, writer, university professor	Progressive Party (PP)	2nd alternate senator: Luiz Carlos Grecco	In the Defense of the Citizen: Progressive Party (PP); Christian Labour Party (PTC)	111
Christian Labour Party (PTC)	Ciro Moura	PTC National Vice President	Christian Labour Party (PTC)	1st alternate senator: Eduardo Souza	In the Defense of the Citizen: Progressive Party (PP); Christian Labour Party (PTC)	360
Christian Labour Party (PTC)	Ciro Moura	PTC National Vice President	Christian Labour Party (PTC)	2nd alternate senator: Luiz Antonio Pizzolato	In the Defense of the Citizen: Progressive Party (PP); Christian Labour Party (PTC)	360
Workers' Party (PT)	Marta Suplicy	Minister of Tourism of Brazil (2007–2008)	Party of the Republic (PR)	1st alternate senator: Antonio Carlos Rodrigues	Union to Change: Workers' Party (PT); Democratic Labour Party (PDT); Communist Party of Brazil (PCdoB); Party of the Republic (PR); Christian Social Democratic Party (PSDC); National Labour Party (PTN); Brazilian Republican Party (PRB); Progressive Republican Party (PRP); Brazilian Labour Renewal Party (PRTB); Labour Party of Brazil (PTdoB)	133
Workers' Party (PT)	Marta Suplicy	Minister of Tourism of Brazil (2007–2008)	Workers' Party (PT)	2nd alternate senator: Paulo Frateschi	Union to Change: Workers' Party (PT); Democratic Labour Party (PDT); Communist Party of Brazil (PCdoB); Party of the Republic (PR); Christian Social Democratic Party (PSDC); National Labour Party (PTN); Brazilian Republican Party (PRB); Progressive Republican Party (PRP); Brazilian Labour Renewal Party (PRTB); Labour Party of Brazil (PTdoB)	133
Communist Party of Brazil (PCdoB)	Netinho de Paula	Member of the Municipal Chamber of São Paulo (2009–2015)	Workers' Party (PT)	1st alternate senator: Ricardo Zarattini	Union to Change: Workers' Party (PT); Democratic Labour Party (PDT); Communist Party of Brazil (PCdoB); Party of the Republic (PR); Christian Social Democratic Party (PSDC); National Labour Party (PTN); Brazilian Republican Party (PRB); Progressive Republican Party (PRP); Brazilian Labour Renewal Party (PRTB); Labour Party of Brazil (PTdoB)	650
Communist Party of Brazil (PCdoB)	Netinho de Paula	Member of the Municipal Chamber of São Paulo (2009–2015)	Workers' Party (PT)	2nd alternate senator: Matilde Ribeiro	Union to Change: Workers' Party (PT); Democratic Labour Party (PDT); Communist Party of Brazil (PCdoB); Party of the Republic (PR); Christian Social Democratic Party (PSDC); National Labour Party (PTN); Brazilian Republican Party (PRB); Progressive Republican Party (PRP); Brazilian Labour Renewal Party (PRTB); Labour Party of Brazil (PTdoB)	650
Brazilian Labour Party (PTB)	Romeu Tuma	Senator for São Paulo (1995–2010)	Brazilian Labour Party (PTB)	1st alternate senator: Antonio Carbonari	—N/a	141
Brazilian Labour Party (PTB)	Romeu Tuma	Senator for São Paulo (1995–2010)	Brazilian Labour Party (PTB)	2nd alternate senator: Murilo Campos	—N/a	141
United Socialist Workers' Party (PSTU)	Ana Luiza	Federal public servant	United Socialist Workers' Party (PSTU)	1st alternate senator: Joel Paradela	—N/a	160
United Socialist Workers' Party (PSTU)	Ana Luiza	Federal public servant	United Socialist Workers' Party (PSTU)	2nd alternate senator: Paula Pascarelli	—N/a	160
Social Liberal Party (PSL)	Moacyr Franco	Member of the Chamber of Deputies (1983–1987)	Social Liberal Party (PSL)	1st alternate senator: Marco Aurélio de Souza	Pay Attention São Paulo: Brazilian Socialist Party (PSB); Social Liberal Party (PSL)	177
Social Liberal Party (PSL)	Moacyr Franco	Member of the Chamber of Deputies (1983–1987)	Social Liberal Party (PSL)	2nd alternate senator: Reinaldo Milan	Pay Attention São Paulo: Brazilian Socialist Party (PSB); Social Liberal Party (PSL)	177
Brazilian Socialist Party (PSB)	Alexandre Serpa		Brazilian Socialist Party (PSB)	1st alternate senator: Edilberto de Paula	Pay Attention São Paulo: Brazilian Socialist Party (PSB); Social Liberal Party (PSL)	400
Brazilian Socialist Party (PSB)	Alexandre Serpa		Brazilian Socialist Party (PSB)	2nd alternate senator: Wagner Bellucci	Pay Attention São Paulo: Brazilian Socialist Party (PSB); Social Liberal Party (PSL)	400
Workers' Cause Party (PCO)	Afonso Teixeira Filho		Workers' Cause Party (PCO)	1st alternate senator: Osmar Brito	—N/a	290
Workers' Cause Party (PCO)	Afonso Teixeira Filho		Workers' Cause Party (PCO)	2nd alternate senator: Nilson Ferreira	—N/a	290
Green Party (PV)	Ricardo Young	Entrepreneur, professor and political scientist	Green Party (PV)	1st alternate senator: Marco Mroz	—N/a	430
Green Party (PV)	Ricardo Young	Entrepreneur, professor and political scientist	Green Party (PV)	2nd alternate senator: Mara Prado	—N/a	430
Brazilian Social Democracy Party (PSDB)	Aloysio Nunes	Minister of Justice of Brazil (2001–2002)	Brazilian Democratic Movement Party (PMDB)	1st alternate senator: Airton Sandoval	United for São Paulo: Brazilian Social Democracy Party (PSDB); Democrats (DEM); Brazilian Democratic Movement Party (PMDB); Social Christian Party (PSC); Popular Socialist Party (PPS); Humanist Party of Solidarity (PHS); Party of National Mobilization (PMN)	451
Brazilian Social Democracy Party (PSDB)	Aloysio Nunes	Minister of Justice of Brazil (2001–2002)	Democrats (DEM)	2nd alternate senator: Marta Costa	United for São Paulo: Brazilian Social Democracy Party (PSDB); Democrats (DEM); Brazilian Democratic Movement Party (PMDB); Social Christian Party (PSC); Popular Socialist Party (PPS); Humanist Party of Solidarity (PHS); Party of National Mobilization (PMN)	451

== Results ==
=== Governor ===
Candidate	Running mate	Party	Votes	%
Geraldo Alckmin	Afif Domingos (DEM)	PSDB	11,519,314	50.63
Aloizio Mercadante	Coca Ferraz (PDT)	PT	8,016,866	35.23
Celso Russomanno	Marcus Vinícius de Freitas	PP	1,233,897	5.42
Paulo Skaf	Marianne Pinotti	PSB	1,038,430	4.56
Fábio Feldmann	Rogério Menezes	PV	940,379	4.13
Anaí Caproni	José André Dorta	PCO	4,656	0.02
Paulo Buffalo	Aldo Santos	PSOL	0	0.00
Igor Grabois	Wagner Farias	PCB	0	0.00
Luiz Carlos Prates	Eliana Lúcia Ferreira	PSTU	0	0.00
Total			22,753,542	100.00
Valid votes			22,753,542	89.90
Invalid votes			1,326,601	5.24
Blank votes			1,230,124	4.86
Total votes			25,310,267	100.00
Registered voters/turnout			30,289,723	83.56
PSDB hold				

Popular vote
Alckmin	50.63%
Mercadante	35.23%
Russomanno	5.42%
Skaf	4.56%
Others	4.15%

=== Senator ===
Candidate	Party	Votes	%
Aloysio Nunes	PSDB	11,189,168	30.42
Marta Suplicy	PT	8,314,027	22.61
Netinho de Paula	PCdoB	7,773,327	21.14
Ricardo Young	PV	4,117,634	11.20
Romeu Tuma (incumbent)	PTB	3,970,169	10.79
Moacyr Franco	PSL	411,661	1.12
Ciro Moura	PTC	275,664	0.75
Marcelo Henrique	PSOL	249,600	0.68
Sérgio Redó	PP	203,443	0.55
Alexandre Serpa	PSB	150,079	0.41
Ana Luiza	PSTU	109,415	0.30
Afonso Teixeira Filho	PCO	14,584	0.04
Total		36,778,771	100.00
Valid votes		36,778,771	72.66
Invalid votes		8,224,020	16.25
Blank votes		5,617,743	11.10
Total votes		50,620,534	100.00
Registered voters/turnout		60,579,446	83.56
PSDB gain from PTB			
PT hold			

Popular vote
Nunes	30.42%
Suplicy	22.61%
Paula	21.14%
Young	11.20%
Tuma	10.79%
Others	3.85%

=== Chamber of Deputies ===
Party	Votes	%	Seats	+/–
Brazilian Social Democracy Party	4,169,596	19.56	13	▼4
Workers' Party	4,114,623	19.30	16	▲2
Brazilian Socialist Party	2,102,072	9.86	7	▲3
Party of the Republic	1,928,102	9.04	4	▲1 (Note: Compared to the combined deputies of the Liberal Party and the Party of the Reconstruction of the National Order elected in 2006. The parties merged after that election.)
Green Party	1,716,592	8.05	6	▲1
Democrats	1,512,179	7.09	6	▲1 (Note: Compared to the deputies of the Liberal Front Party elected in 2006. The party was renamed Democrats in 2007.)
Democratic Labour Party	883,108	4.14	3	Steady
Progressive Party	832,725	3.91	2	▼4
Popular Socialist Party	725,799	3.40	3	▲2
Brazilian Labour Party	676,326	3.17	2	▼2 (Note: Compared to the combined deputies of the Brazilian Labour Party and the Party of Nation's Retirees elected in 2006. The parties merged after that election.)
Social Christian Party	624,938	2.93	2	▲1
Brazilian Democratic Movement Party	460,653	2.16	1	▼1
Communist Party of Brazil	446,087	2.09	2	▲1
Socialism and Liberty Party	317,668	1.49	1	Steady
Brazilian Republican Party	281,371	1.32	2	New
Christian Labour Party	125,713	0.59	0	▼2
Party of National Mobilization	114,360	0.54	0	Steady
Progressive Republican Party	62,839	0.29	0	Steady
Social Liberal Party	54,686	0.26	0	Steady
National Labour Party	52,312	0.25	0	Steady
Humanist Party of Solidarity	43,753	0.21	0	Steady
United Socialist Workers' Party	23,036	0.11	0	Steady
Labour Party of Brazil	19,147	0.09	0	0
Christian Social Democratic Party	11,654	0.05	0	Steady
Brazilian Communist Party	7,773	0.04	0	Steady
Brazilian Labour Renewal Party	6,107	0.03	0	Steady
Workers' Cause Party	4,108	0.02	0	Steady
Total	21,317,327	100.00	70	–
Valid votes	21,317,327	84.22		
Invalid votes	2,149,100	8.49		
Blank votes	1,843,840	7.28		
Total votes	25,310,267	100.00		
Registered voters/turnout	30,289,723	83.56		
