= 2006 São Paulo gubernatorial election =

Brazilian gubernatorial election

- 1 October 2006
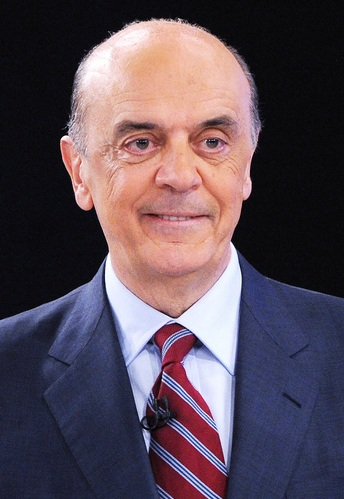

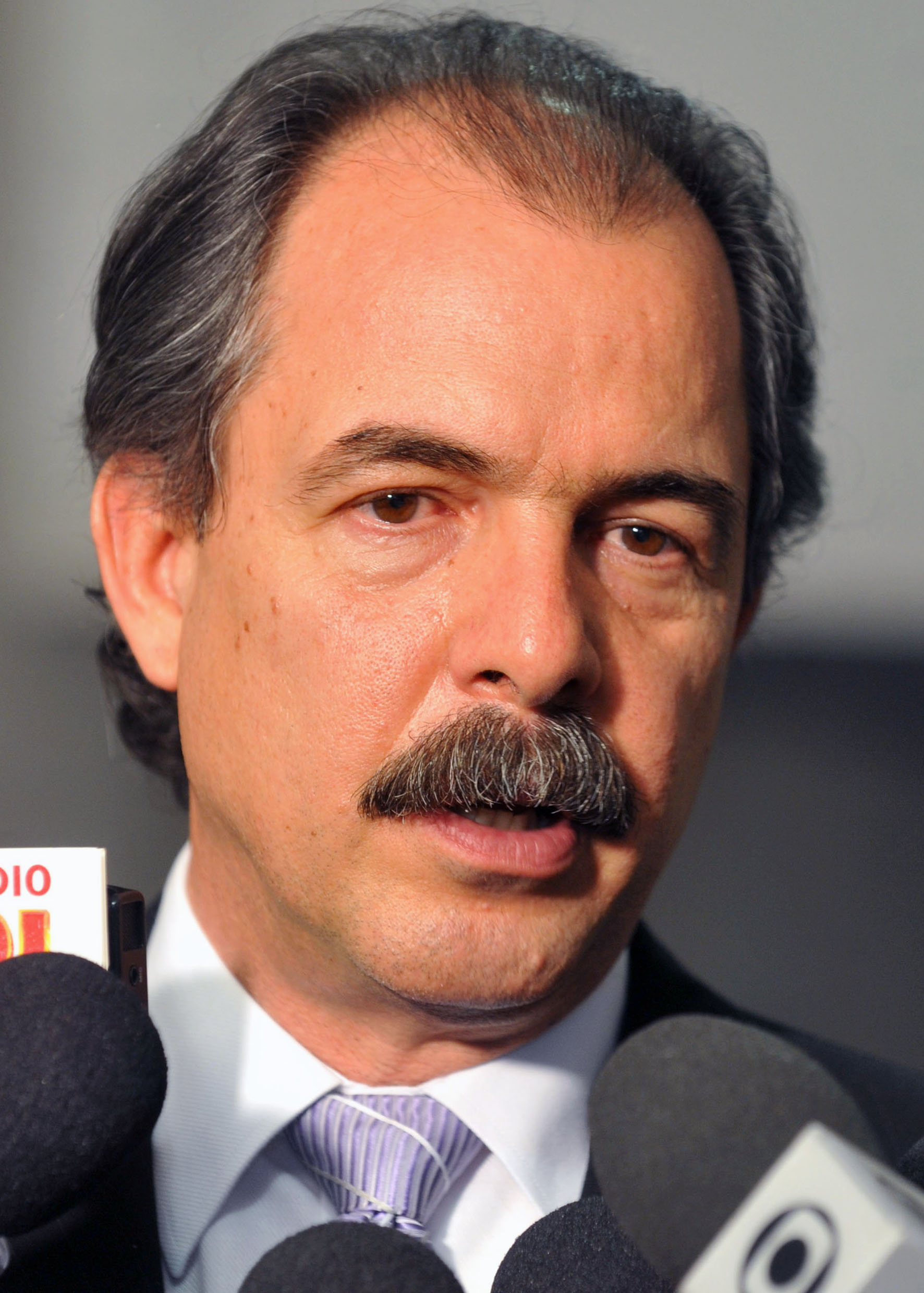
| Nominee | José Serra | Aloizio Mercadante |
| Party | PSDB | PT |
| Running mate | Alberto Goldman | Nádia Campeão |
| Popular vote | 12,381,038 | 6,771,582 |
| Percentage | 57.93% | 31.68% |
- Candidate with the most votes per municipality (645): José Serra (629 municipalities); Aloizio Mercadante (13 municipalities); Orestes Quércia (3 municipalities)
Governor before election
Claudio Lembo
PFL
Elected Governor
José Serra
PSDB

2006 São Paulo gubernatorial election
- 1 October 2006
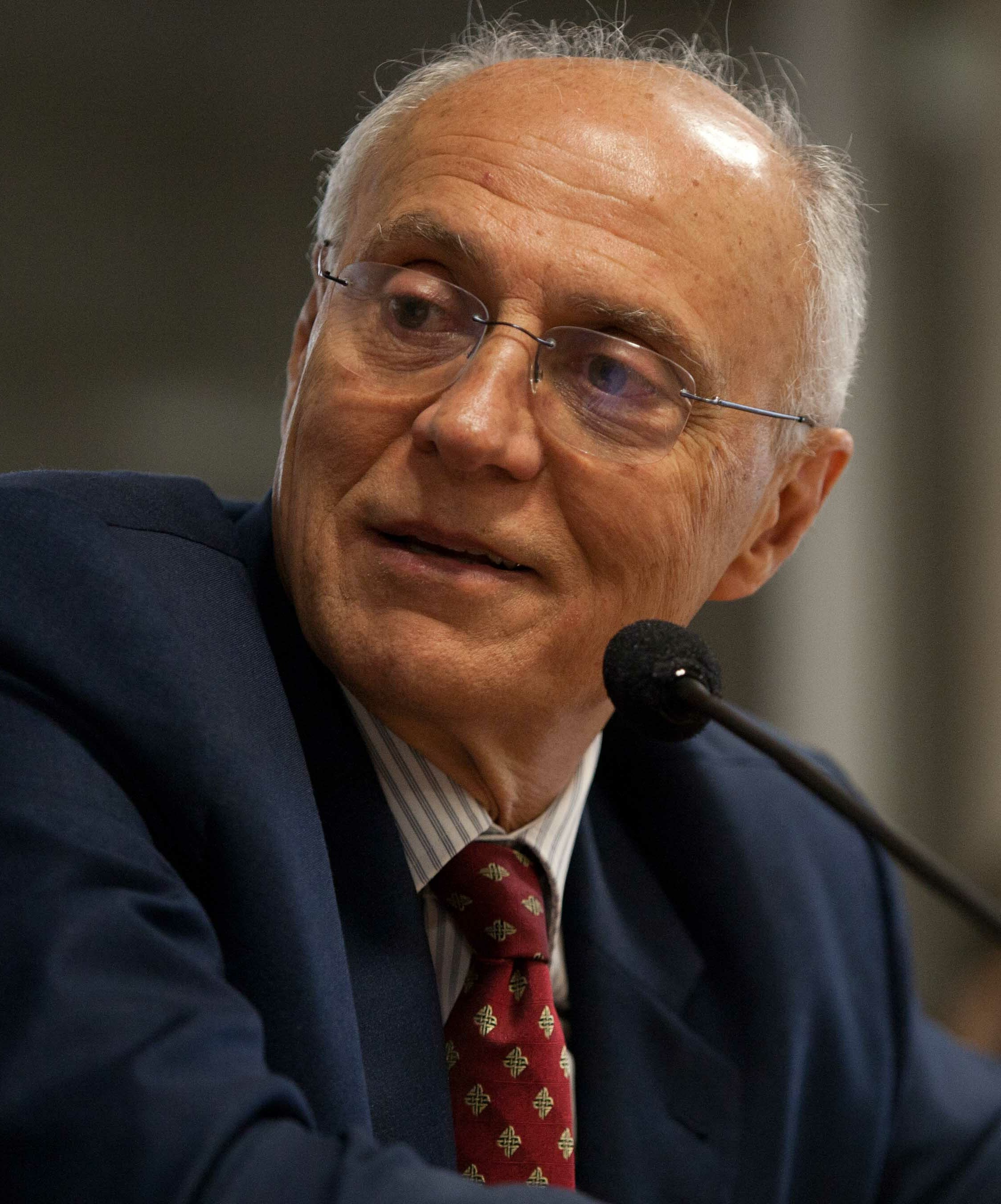

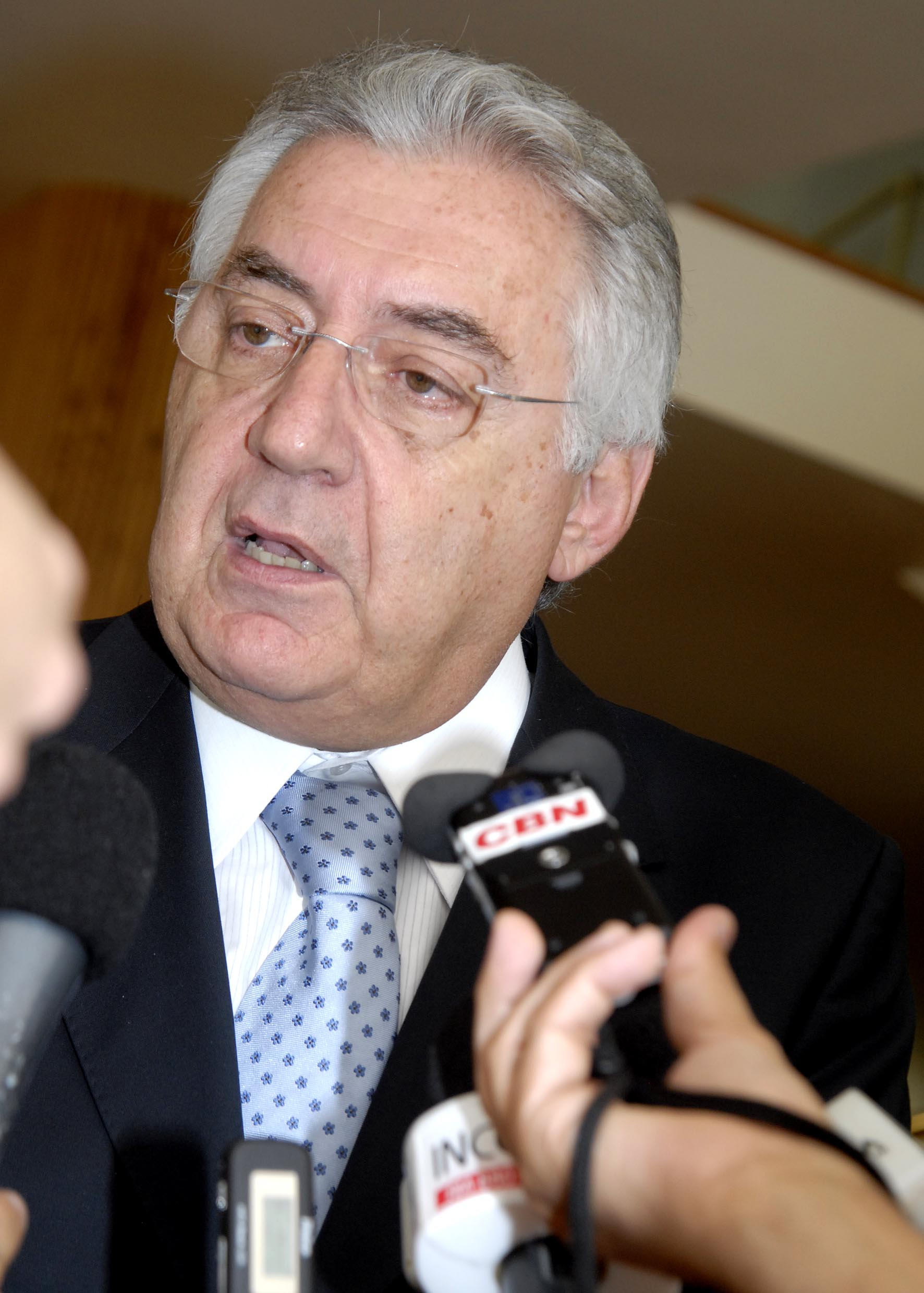
| Nominee | Eduardo Suplicy | Afif Domingos |
| Party | PT | PFL |
| Popular vote | 8,986,803 | 8,212,177 |
| Percentage | 47.82% | 43.70% |
- Candidate with the most votes per municipality (645): Eduardo Suplicy; Afif Domingos
Senator before election
Eduardo Suplicy
PT
Elected Senator
Eduardo Suplicy
PT

The São Paulo state elections of 2006 was held along with Brazilian general elections, on October 1 and on October 29, 2006. Since 1994, as a result of a constitutional amendment which reduced the presidential term to four years, all federal and state elections in Brazil have coincided. The state elections decide Governors and the state deputies for the Legislative Assemblies. Also, the members of the National Congress are elected by state.

== Governor and Vice-Governor ==
In general, the rules of the presidential ballot also apply to the gubernatorial one. That is, the ballot is taken in two rounds, if no one reaches at least an absolute majority of the valid votes, a second round between the two most voted candidates will be held. All the candidates holding executive posts had to renounce till April 2, 2006 in order to be able to run.

The candidates for Governor of São Paulo were, in no particular order:

- The Brazilian Social Democracy Party (PSDB) – was the governing party, but governor Geraldo Alckmin could not run for reelection. Thus, the party had to appoint a new name for the run. After governor Alckmin was selected as the presidential candidate on a dispute with the state capital mayor José Serra, it was proposed that Serra should be the candidate for the state government.
- Workers' Party (PT) – the main opposition party in the state held primaries and chose Aloizio Mercadante, senator of São Paulo in the fourth year of his term (the term of a senator in Brazil is eight years-long).
- Brazilian Democratic Movement Party (PMDB) – chose former governor of São Paulo Orestes Quércia as their candidate.
- Other candidates included Plinio de Arruda Sampaio (PSOL) and Carlos Apolinário (PDT)

== Results ==
=== Governor ===
| Candidate | Running mate | Party | Votes | % |
|---|---|---|---|---|
| José Serra | Alberto Goldman | PSDB | 12,381,038 | 57.93 |
| Aloizio Mercadante | Nádia Campeão (PCdoB) | PT | 6,771,582 | 31.68 |
| Orestes Quércia | Átila Russomanno (PP) | PMDB | 977,695 | 4.57 |
| Plínio de Arruda Sampaio | Mauro Iasi (PCB) | PSOL | 532,470 | 2.49 |
| Carlos Apolinário | José Pereira dos Santos | PDT | 430,847 | 2.02 |
| Cláudio de Mauro | Aurélio Nomura | PV | 186,087 | 0.87 |
| Mario Guide | Marcos Gava | PSB | 39,857 | 0.19 |
| Tarcísio Foglio | Samuel Rodrigues | PSC | 17,420 | 0.08 |
| Antônio da Cunha Lima | Edna Ortolan | PSDC | 7,073 | 0.03 |
| Roberto Sarli Júnior | Roberto Machioni | PAN | 6,607 | 0.03 |
| Eder Xavier | Jarbas Ávila | PTC | 6,047 | 0.03 |
| Roberto Siqueira Gomes | Marcos Germano | PSL | 5,982 | 0.03 |
| Anaí Caproni | Firmino Alves Rosa | PCO | 5,902 | 0.03 |
| Fred Corrêa | Evandro de Lima (PTdoB) | PTN | 4,523 | 0.02 |
| Pedro Viviani | Armando Coelho Neto | PMN | 0 | 0.00 |
| Rui Reichmann | Gioconda Cornélio | PRONA | 0 | 0.00 |
| Total | | | 21,373,130 | 100.00 |
| Valid votes | | | 21,373,130 | 89.91 |
| Invalid votes | | | 1,274,283 | 5.36 |
| Blank votes | | | 1,124,475 | 4.73 |
| Total votes | | | 23,771,888 | 100.00 |
| Registered voters/turnout | | | 28,037,734 | 84.79 |
| PSDB hold | | | | |

Popular vote
| Serra | 57.93% |
| Mercadante | 31.68% |
| Quércia | 4.57% |
| Sampaio | 2.49% |
| Apolinário | 2.02% |
| Others | 1.31% |

=== Senator ===
| Candidate | Party | Votes | % |
|---|---|---|---|
| Eduardo Suplicy (incumbent) | PT | 8,968,803 | 47.77 |
| Guilherme Afif | PFL | 8,212,177 | 43.74 |
| Alda Marco Antônio | PMDB | 929,179 | 4.95 |
| Elza Pereira | PDT | 195,817 | 1.04 |
| Domingos Fernandes | PV | 187,587 | 1.00 |
| Luís Carlos Prates | PSTU | 81,525 | 0.43 |
| Manoel do Nascimento | PSC | 52,388 | 0.28 |
| Marcelo Reis Lobo | PSB | 48,581 | 0.26 |
| Robson Malek | PRONA | 42,971 | 0.23 |
| Paulo Piasenti | PTdoB | 22,484 | 0.12 |
| João Dárcio Filho | PTN | 9,856 | 0.05 |
| José Ribamar Dantas | PMN | 9,426 | 0.05 |
| Ana Prudente | PTC | 7,050 | 0.04 |
| Antônio Carlos Silva | PCO | 3,027 | 0.02 |
| João Rezende | PAN | 2,550 | 0.01 |
| Constantino Cury | PHS | 0 | 0.00 |
| Félix Gil Fernandes | PRP | 0 | 0.00 |
| Raimundo Souza Teixeira | PRTB | 0 | 0.00 |
| Rubens Pavão | PSDC | 0 | 0.00 |
| Total | | 18,773,421 | 100.00 |
| Valid votes | | 18,773,421 | 79.03 |
| Invalid votes | | 2,757,189 | 11.61 |
| Blank votes | | 2,223,288 | 9.36 |
| Total votes | | 23,753,898 | 100.00 |
| Registered voters/turnout | | 28,037,734 | 84.72 |
| PT hold | | | |

Popular vote
| Suplicy | 47.77% |
| Afif | 43.74% |
| Antônio | 4.95% |
| Others | 3.27% |

=== Chamber of Deputies ===
| Party | Votes | % | Seats | +/– |
|---|---|---|---|---|
| Brazilian Social Democracy Party | 4,291,456 | 21.08 | 17 | ▲6 |
| Workers' Party | 3,869,122 | 19.01 | 14 | ▼4 |
| Liberal Front Party | 1,587,703 | 7.80 | 5 | ▼2 |
| Progressive Party | 1,571,945 | 7.72 | 6 | ▲3 |
| Green Party | 1,442,429 | 7.09 | 5 | ▲3 |
| Brazilian Socialist Party | 1,154,455 | 5.67 | 4 | ▼1 |
| Brazilian Labour Party | 1,082,382 | 5.32 | 4 | ▼1 |
| Democratic Labour Party | 1,037,481 | 5.10 | 3 | ▲2 |
| Brazilian Democratic Movement Party | 792,331 | 3.89 | 3 | ▼1 |
| Liberal Party | 668,164 | 3.28 | 2 | ▼1 |
| Christian Labour Party | 527,373 | 2.59 | 2 | ▲2 |
| Popular Socialist Party | 497,105 | 2.44 | 1 | ▼2 |
| Social Christian Party | 476,306 | 2.34 | 1 | ▲1 |
| Party of the Reconstruction of the National Order | 437,096 | 2.15 | 1 | ▼5 |
| Socialism and Liberty Party | 295,933 | 1.45 | 1 | New |
| Communist Party of Brazil | 258,731 | 1.27 | 1 | ▼1 |
| Christian Social Democratic Party | 82,283 | 0.40 | 0 | Steady |
| Social Liberal Party | 75,132 | 0.37 | 0 | Steady |
| Progressive Republican Party | 33,478 | 0.16 | 0 | Steady |
| Humanist Party of Solidarity | 31,474 | 0.15 | 0 | Steady |
| Labour Party of Brazil | 27,945 | 0.14 | 0 | Steady |
| Party of National Mobilization | 27,547 | 0.14 | 0 | Steady |
| Party of the Nation's Retirees | 25,908 | 0.13 | 0 | Steady |
| United Socialist Workers' Party | 18,227 | 0.09 | 0 | Steady |
| National Labour Party | 14,715 | 0.07 | 0 | Steady |
| Brazilian Labour Renewal Party | 12,110 | 0.06 | 0 | Steady |
| Brazilian Communist Party | 10,456 | 0.05 | 0 | Steady |
| Workers' Cause Party | 5,591 | 0.03 | 0 | Steady |
| Total | 20,354,878 | 100.00 | 70 | – |
| Valid votes | 20,354,878 | 85.63 | | |
| Invalid votes | 1,749,645 | 7.36 | | |
| Blank votes | 1,667,056 | 7.01 | | |
| Total votes | 23,771,579 | 100.00 | | |
| Registered voters/turnout | 28,037,734 | 84.78 | | |
