= Guilherme Afif Domingos =

Brazilian politician (born 1943)

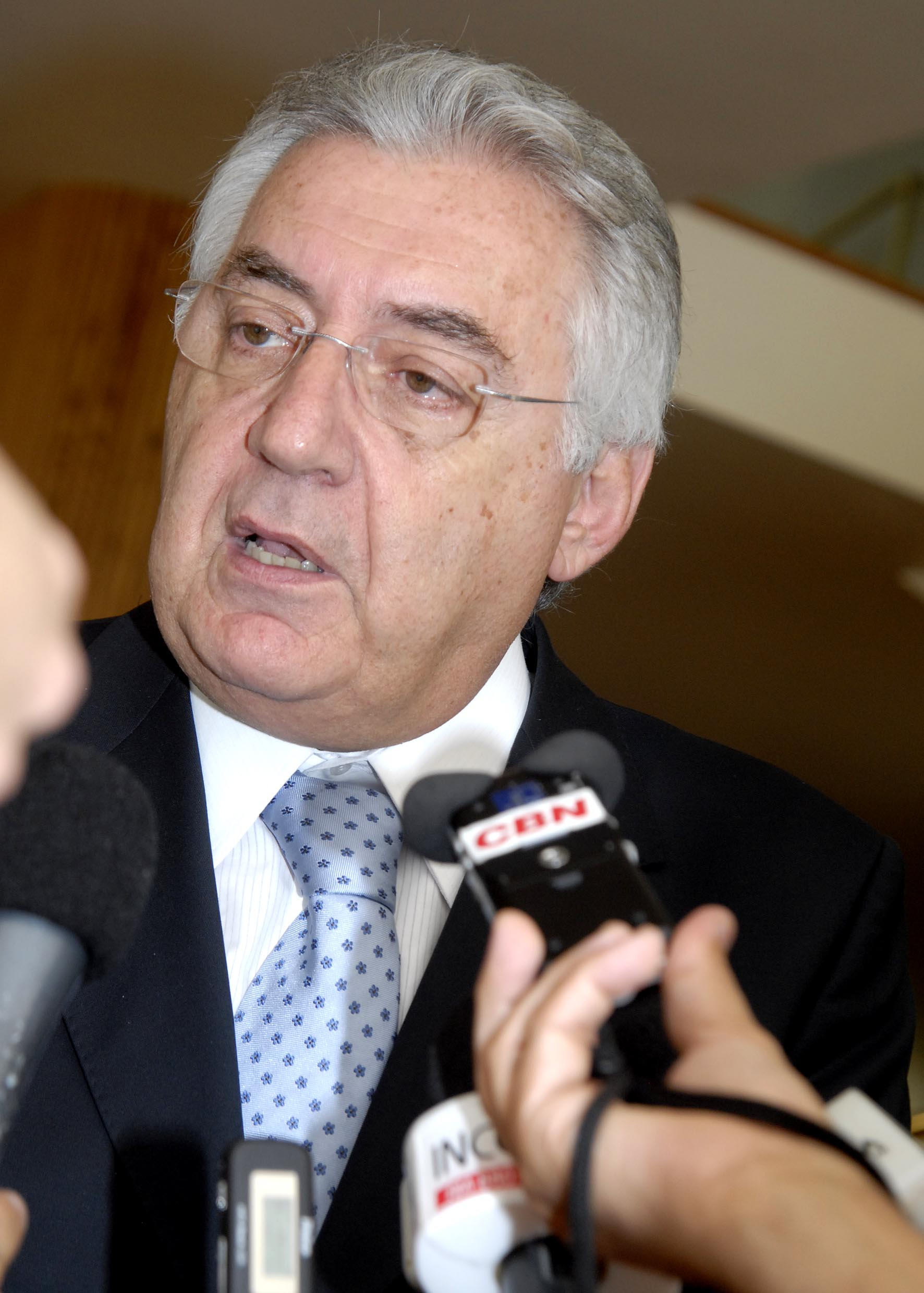

Secretary of Special Projects of São Paulo
- Incumbent
- Assumed office 1 January 2023
- Governor: Tarcísio de Freitas
- Preceded by: Office established

President of Sebrae
- In office 29 October 2015 – 7 January 2019
- Preceded by: Luiz Barretto Filho
- Succeeded by: João Henrique Sousa

Minister for Micro and Small Enterprises
- In office 6 May 2013 – 2 October 2015
- President: Dilma Rousseff
- Preceded by: Office established
- Succeeded by: Carlos Leony (Special Secretary)

Lieutenant Governor of São Paulo
- In office 1 January 2011 – 1 January 2015
- Governor: Geraldo Alckmin
- Preceded by: Alberto Goldman
- Succeeded by: Márcio França

Secretary of Development of São Paulo
- In office 1 January 2011 – 2 May 2011
- Governor: Geraldo Alckmin
- Preceded by: Luciano Almeida
- Succeeded by: Paulo Alexandre Barbosa

Secretary of Labour and Employment of São Paulo
- In office 1 January 2007 – 31 March 2010
- Governor: José Serra
- Preceded by: Walter Caveanha
- Succeeded by: Pedro Rubez Jehá

Secretary of Planning of São Paulo
- In office 31 March 1998 – 11 May 1998
- Mayor: Celso Pitta
- Preceded by: Gilberto Kassab
- Succeeded by: Heloísa Proença

Member of the Chamber of Deputies
- In office 1 February 1987 – 1 February 1991
- Constituency: São Paulo

Secretary of Agriculture and Supply of São Paulo
- In office 4 February 1980 – 13 February 1982
- Governor: Paulo Maluf
- Preceded by: Eduardo de Carvalho
- Succeeded by: Cláudio Ferreira

Personal details
- Born: Guilherme Afif Domingos; 18 September 1943 (age 83) São Paulo, São Paulo, Brazil
- Party: PDS (1981–85); PL (1985–92); PFL (1992–2007); DEM (2007–11); PSD (2011–present)
- Spouse: Silvia Maria Dellivenneri (m. 1970)
- Parents: Jamil Domingos (father); Henriette Afif (mother)
- Profession: Company administrator, entrepreneur

Guilherme Afif Domingos (born 18 September 1943) is a Brazilian company administrator, entrepreneur, and politician of Lebanese descent, member of the Social Democratic Party (PSD). He was Vice Governor of São Paulo between 2011 and 2014, and chief-minister of the Secretariat of Micro and Small Business of the Presidency of the Republic between 2013 and 2015. Currently, is president of the Sebrae.

In 1970, he is married to the writer Silvia Maria Dellivenneri, with whom he has four children and ten grandchildren. On 13 October 2024, his wife died at the age of 74 in the municipality of São Paulo.

After the leaving of former Minister of Finance Henrique Meirelles from the PSD, Afif started his pre-campaign to be confirmed as the party candidate for President of Brazil in the July convention.

Political offices
Vacant Title last held by Alberto Goldman	Lieutenant Governor of São Paulo; 2011–2015	Succeeded by Márcio França
New office	Chief Minister of the Department for Micro and Small Businesses; 2013–2015	Office abolished
Party political offices
Preceded by Claudio Lembo (as PFL)	DEM nominee for Lieutenant Governor of São Paulo; 2010	Succeeded by Rodrigo Garcia (2018)
