= Rodrigues Alckmin =

Brazilian jurist, lawyer and politician

His Excellency Rodrigues Alckmin

Justice of the Supreme Federal Court
- In office 11 October 1972 – 6 November 1978
- Appointed by: Emílio Garrastazu Médici
- Preceded by: Moacir Amaral Santos
- Succeeded by: Luís Rafael Mayer

Personal details
- Born: José Geraldo Rodrigues de Alckmin; 4 April 1915 São Paulo, São Paulo, Brazil
- Died: 6 November 1978 (aged 63)
- Education: University of São Paulo

José Geraldo Rodrigues de Alckmin (Guaratinguetá, 4 April 1915 – Brasília, 6 November 1978) was a Brazilian jurist and professor. He was a minister of the Federal Supreme Court, appointed during the military dictatorship by Emílio Garrastazu Médici.

A prominent member of Opus Dei in Brazil, he was the uncle of current Brazilian Vice President Geraldo Alckmin. He taught at the Mackenzie Presbyterian University.
