= José Gregori =

Portuguese lawyer and politician (1930–2023)

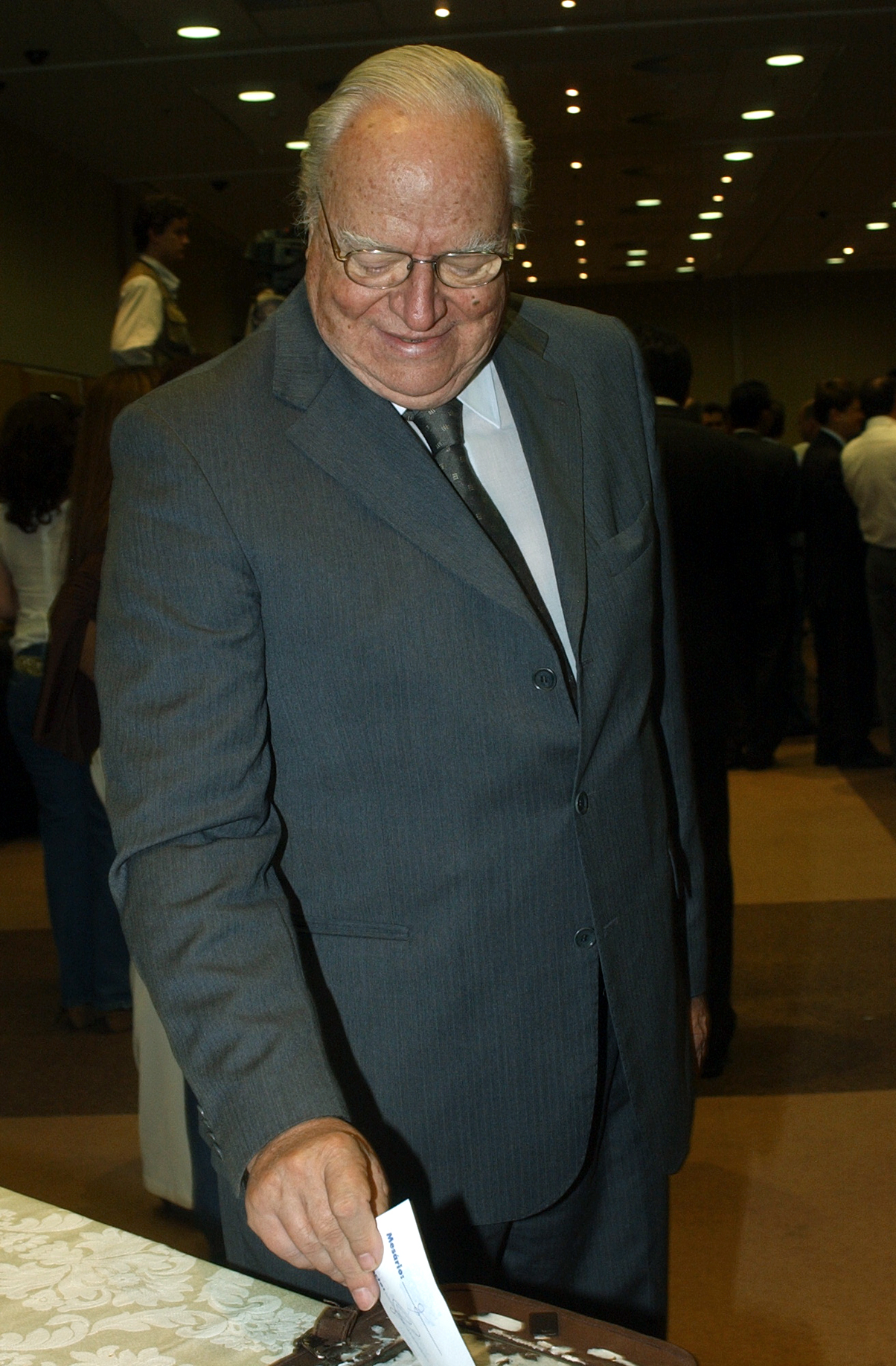
- Gregori in 2007

Minister of Justice
- In office 14 April 2000 – 14 November 2001
- Preceded by: José Carlos Dias
- Succeeded by: Aloysio Nunes

Personal details
- Born: 13 October 1930; São Paulo, Brazil
- Died: 3 September 2023 (aged 92); São Paulo, Brazil
- Political party: PMDB; PSDB
- Education: Law School, University of São Paulo
- Occupation: Lawyer

José Gregori (13 October 1930 – 3 September 2023) was a Brazilian lawyer and politician. A member of the Brazilian Democratic Movement Party and the Brazilian Social Democracy Party, he served as Special Secretary for Human Rights from 1997 to 2000 and as Minister of Justice from 2000 to 2001.

Gregori died on 3 September 2023, at the age of 92.
