= Aloysio Nunes =

Brazilian politician and lawyer

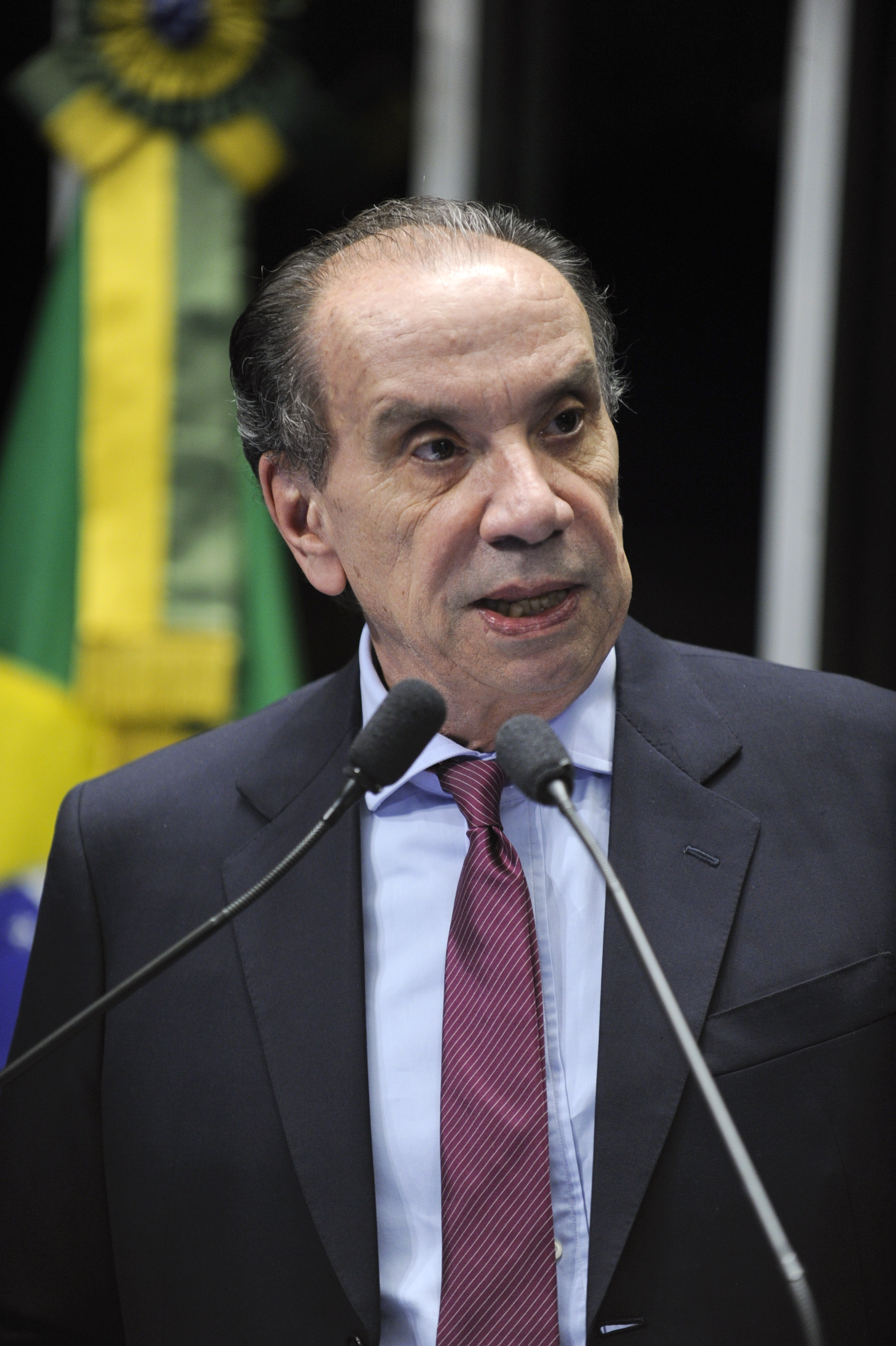

Minister of Foreign Affairs
- In office 7 March 2017 – 1 January 2019
- President: Michel Temer
- Preceded by: José Serra
- Succeeded by: Ernesto Araújo

Senator for São Paulo
- In office 1 February 2011 – 1 February 2019
- Preceded by: Aloizio Mercadante
- Succeeded by: Airton Sandoval

Minister of Justice
- In office 14 November 2001 – 3 April 2002
- President: Fernando Henrique Cardoso
- Preceded by: José Gregori
- Succeeded by: Miguel Reale Júnior

Secretary-General of the Presidency
- In office 3 August 1999 – 14 November 2001
- President: Fernando Henrique Cardoso
- Preceded by: Eduardo Graeff
- Succeeded by: Arthur Virgílio Neto

Member of the Chamber of Deputies
- In office 1 February 1995 – 1 February 2007
- Constituency: São Paulo

Lieutenant Governor of São Paulo
- In office 15 March 1991 – 1 January 1995
- Governor: Luiz Antônio Fleury
- Preceded by: Almino Afonso
- Succeeded by: Geraldo Alckmin

Member of the Legislative Assembly of São Paulo
- In office 15 March 1983 – 15 March 1991
- Constituency: At-large

Personal details
- Born: 5 April 1945 (age 81) São José do Rio Preto, São Paulo, Brazil
- Party: PSDB (1997–present)
- Other political affiliations: PCB (1963–1974); MDB (1974–1980); PMDB (1980–1997)
- Spouse: Gisele Nu
- Education: University of São Paulo

Aloysio Nunes Ferreira Filho (born 5 April 1945) is a Brazilian lawyer and politician. A member of PSDB, Nunes was a senator from São Paulo from 2011 to 2017, and was Brazil's Minister of Foreign Affairs from 2017 to 2018.

== Biography ==
Aloysio Nunes attended the University of São Paulo Law School in the 1960s when he got involved into politics, associated with the Brazilian Communist Party. During the military dictatorship he participated in protests against the regime. Later he was exiled in Paris, France.

In 1979 he was able to return to Brazilian soil due to the Amnesty Law, that pardoned the oppositionist political militants. He de-affiliated from the Brazilian Communist Party and joined the Brazilian Democratic Movement Party. In 1982 he was elected deputy in São Paulo. The dictatorship ended in 1985.

== Political career ==
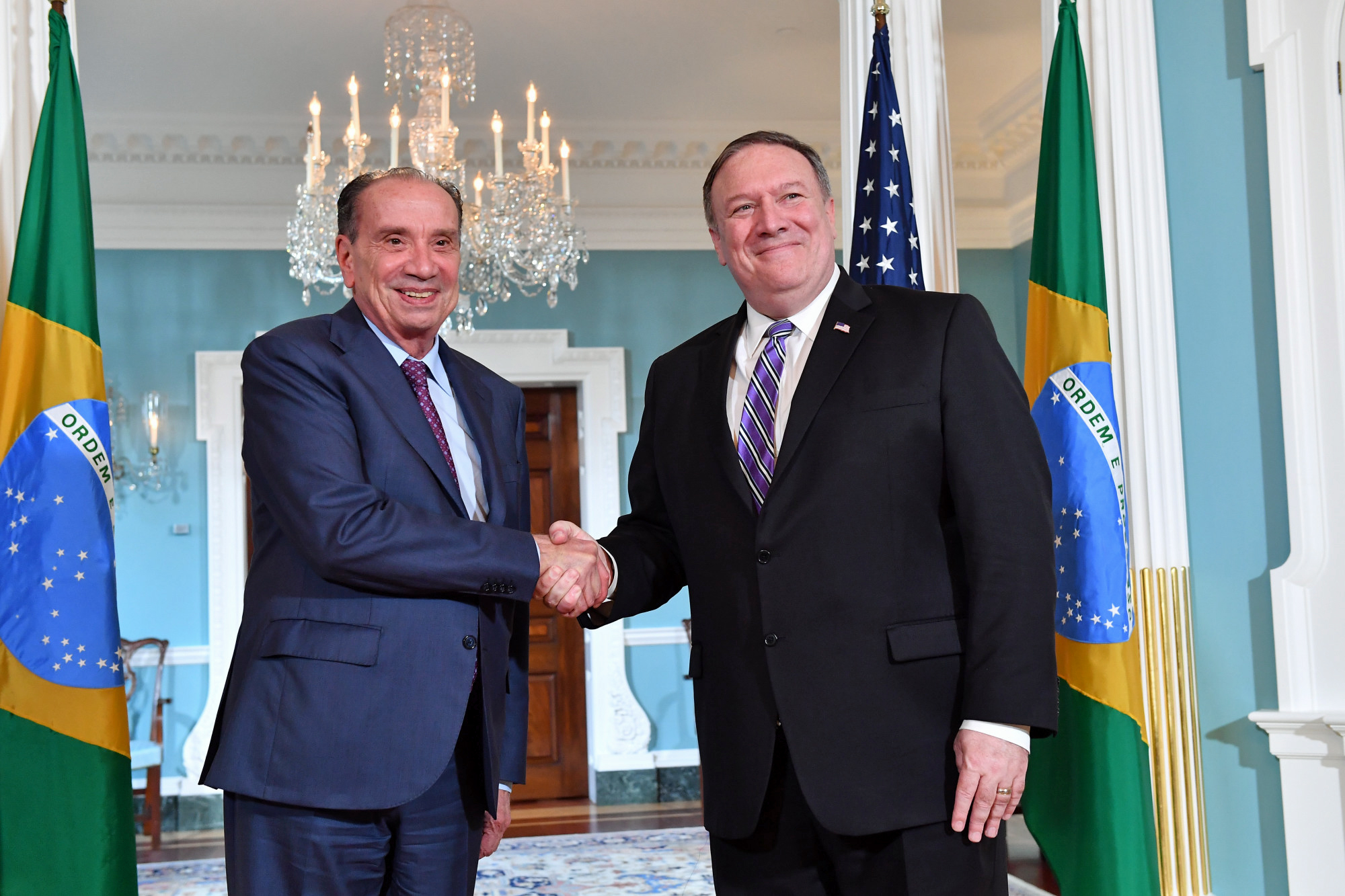
Nunes meets with U.S. Secretary of State Mike Pompeo at the U.S. Department of State in Washington, D.C., on June 4, 2018.

In 1990 he was elected vice governor of São Paulo. He governed the state in a few occasions, when the governor was travelling or in each case, absent.

He was candidate for mayor of the city of São Paulo in 1992, but lost to Paulo Maluf.

He was elected federal deputy in 1994. In 1997 he left the party and joined the Brazilian Social Democracy Party. He was a special aide to president Fernando Henrique Cardoso and later his minister of justice.

He worked in the governments of José Serra in the city and the state of São Paulo.

In 2010 he was elected the senator with the highest number of votes in the history of Brazil, with astonishing 11.189.168 votes (30.4%).

He was the candidate to the vice presidency in the 2014 presidential elections in Aécio Neves's ticket. Together they had obtained slightly more than 51 million votes, however they lost the elections by a slight margin to Dilma Rousseff, from the Workers' Party (Partido dos Trabalhadores - PT).

== See also ==
- List of foreign ministers in 2017
- List of current foreign ministers

Political offices
Preceded by Almino Afonso	Vice Governor of São Paulo; 1991–95	Succeeded by Geraldo Alckmin
Preceded by José Gregori	Minister of Justice; 2001–02	Succeeded by Miguel Reale Júnior
Preceded by Marcos Galvão; Acting	Minister of Foreign Affairs; 2017–19	Succeeded by Ernesto Araújo
Party political offices
Preceded by Almir Gabriel (1989)	PSDB nominee for Vice President of Brazil; 2014	Succeeded by Mara Gabrilli
