= Airton Sandoval =

Brazilian lawyer and politician

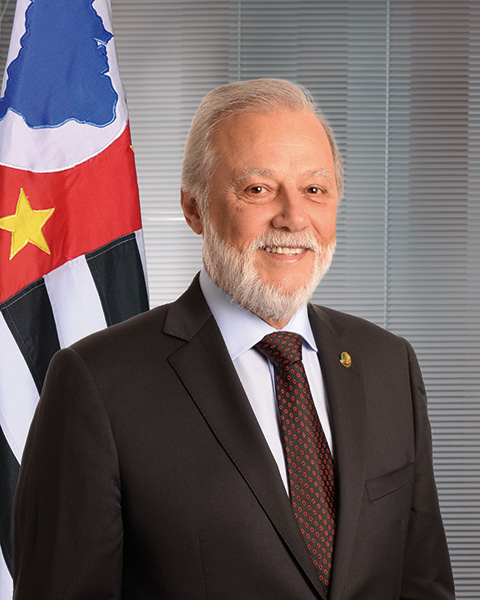

Senator from São Paulo
- Incumbent
- Assumed office 9 March 2017

Chief of Staff of the Mayor of Franca
- In office 1 January 2013 – 1 January 2017
- Mayor: Alexandre Ferreira

Federal Deputy from São Paulo
- In office 1 February 1973 – 1 February 1995

Personal details
- Born: Airton Sandoval Santana; 21 June 1943 (age 82) Itirapuã, SP, Brazil
- Political party: MDB (1974–1977); ARENA (1977–1979); PMDB (1979–present)
- Occupation: Lawyer

Airton Sandoval Santana (born 21 June 1943 in Itirapuã) is a Brazilian lawyer and politician affiliated to the Brazilian Democratic Movement Party (PMDB).

Sandoval was elected in 2010 as 1st Substitute of senator Aloysio Nunes, but officially assumed office as senator after Nunes assumed office as Minister of Foreign Affairs, appointed by president Michel Temer.
