= Geraldo Alckmin =

Vice President of Brazil since 2023

His Excellency Geraldo Alckmin
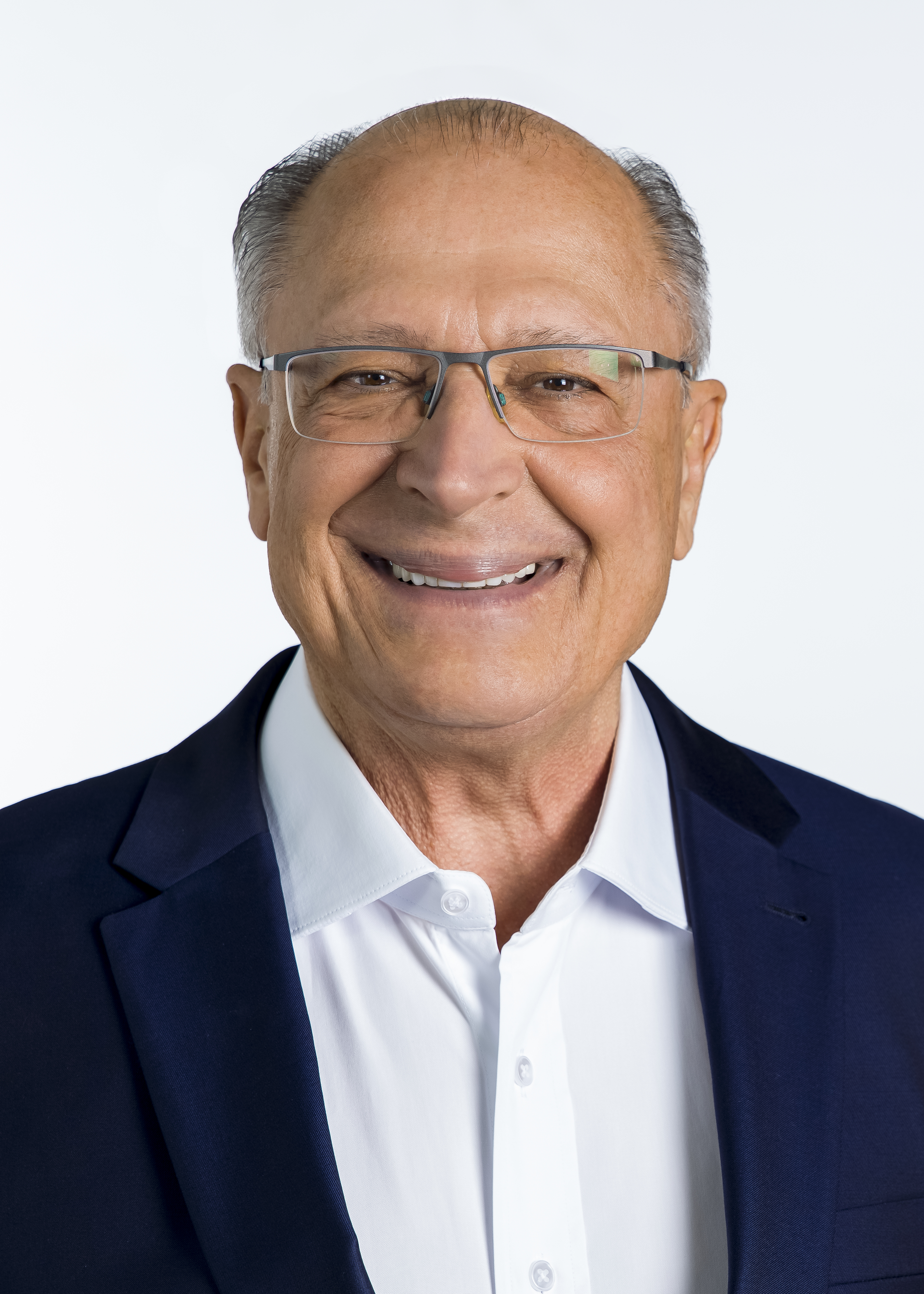
- Alckmin in 2026

26th Vice President of Brazil
- Incumbent
- Assumed office 1 January 2023
- President: Luiz Inácio Lula da Silva
- Preceded by: Hamilton Mourão

Minister of Development, Industry, Trade and Services
- In office 1 January 2023 – 3 April 2026
- President: Luiz Inácio Lula da Silva
- Preceded by: Marcos Jorge
- Succeeded by: Márcio Elias Rosa
Executive offices
Governor of São Paulo
In office 1 January 2011 – 6 April 2018
Vice Governor	Afif Domingos (2011–2014); Márcio França (2015–2018)
Preceded by	Alberto Goldman
Succeeded by	Márcio França
In office 6 March 2001 – 30 March 2006; Acting: 22 January 2001 – 6 March 2001
Vice Governor	Vacant (2001–2003); Cláudio Lembo (2003–2006)
Preceded by	Mário Covas
Succeeded by	Cláudio Lembo
Secretary of Development of São Paulo
In office 19 January 2009 – 1 April 2010
Governor	José Serra
Preceded by	Alberto Goldman
Succeeded by	Luciano Almeida
Vice Governor of São Paulo
In office 1 January 1995 – 6 March 2001
Governor	Mário Covas
Preceded by	Aloysio Nunes
Succeeded by	Cláudio Lembo
Mayor of Pindamonhangaba
In office 31 January 1977 – 15 May 1982
Vice Mayor	Thiers Fernandes Lobo
Preceded by	João Bosco Nogueira
Succeeded by	Thiers Fernandes Lobo
Legislative offices
Member of the Chamber of Deputies
In office 1 February 1987 – 31 December 1994
Constituency	São Paulo
State Deputy of São Paulo
In office 15 March 1983 – 1 February 1987
Constituency	At-large
Councillor of Pindamonhangaba
In office 1 January 1973 – 31 December 1976
Constituency	At-large
Party political offices
First Vice President of the Brazilian Socialist Party
Incumbent
Assumed office 1 June 2025
Preceded by	Paulo Câmara
President of the Brazilian Social Democracy Party
In office 9 December 2017 – 31 May 2019
Preceded by	Aécio Neves
Succeeded by	Bruno Araújo

Personal details
- Born: Geraldo José Rodrigues Alckmin Filho; 7 November 1952 (age 73) Pindamonhangaba, São Paulo, Brazil
- Party: PSB (since 2022)
- Other political affiliations: MDB (1972–1980); PMDB (1980–1988); PSDB (1988–2021); Independent (2021–2022)
- Spouse: Maria Lúcia Ribeiro (m. 1979)
- Children: 3
- Relatives: Rodrigues Alckmin (uncle)
- Education: University of Taubaté (BM)
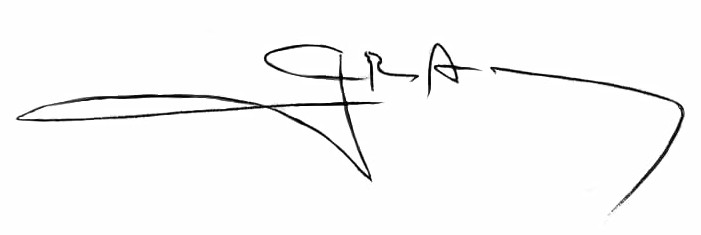
- Signature
- Website: Official website

Geraldo José Rodrigues Alckmin Filho (Brazilian Portuguese pronunciation: [ʒeˈɾawdu ʒoˈzɛ ʁoˈdɾiɡez ˈawkmĩ ˈfiʎu]; born 7 November 1952) is a Brazilian physician and politician serving as the 26th vice president of Brazil since 2023. He previously was the Governor of São Paulo for two nonconsecutive terms, the longest serving since democratization, 2001 to 2006 and 2011 to 2018.

Before entering politics, Alckmin attended the Universidade de Taubaté's medical school, specializing in anesthesiology, going on to work in the São Paulo Public Service Hospital. Alckmin was elected mayor of his hometown Pindamonhangaba in 1982, becoming a founder of the Brazilian Social Democracy Party (PSDB) in 1988. Alckmin first became governor of São Paulo in 2001 after the death of Mário Covas.

Alckmin was a candidate for President of Brazil in 2006 for the PSDB, losing to incumbent President Luiz Inácio Lula da Silva in the second round. Alckmin again ran for president for the PSDB in 2018, but placed fourth, not advancing to the second round.

Alckmin joined the Brazilian Socialist Party (PSB) in 2022 to be the running mate of former rival da Silva in the 2022 presidential election. After the ticket's victory, Alckmin became vice-president. Alckmin is usually described by political analysts and supporters as a pro-business centrist, closely associated with the political and financial establishment.

== Biography ==
Geraldo José Rodrigues Alckmin Filho was born in the city of Pindamonhangaba, Vale do Paraíba. Alckmin is the son of Geraldo José Rodrigues Alckmin and Míriam Penteado. According to Época magazine, Geraldo received a Christian formation from the Opus Dei Catholic prelature, and told the magazine that his uncle José Geraldo was from Opus Dei.

The Alckmin family has a history in politics, most notably Rodrigues Alckmin, a minister of the Supreme Federal Court, and José Maria Alkmin, vice-president in the Castelo Branco administration.

Geraldo is married to Maria Lúcia Ribeiro Alckmin and is the father of three children. Sophia, Geraldo and Thomaz. Thomaz died in a helicopter accident on 2 April 2015.

== Early political career ==
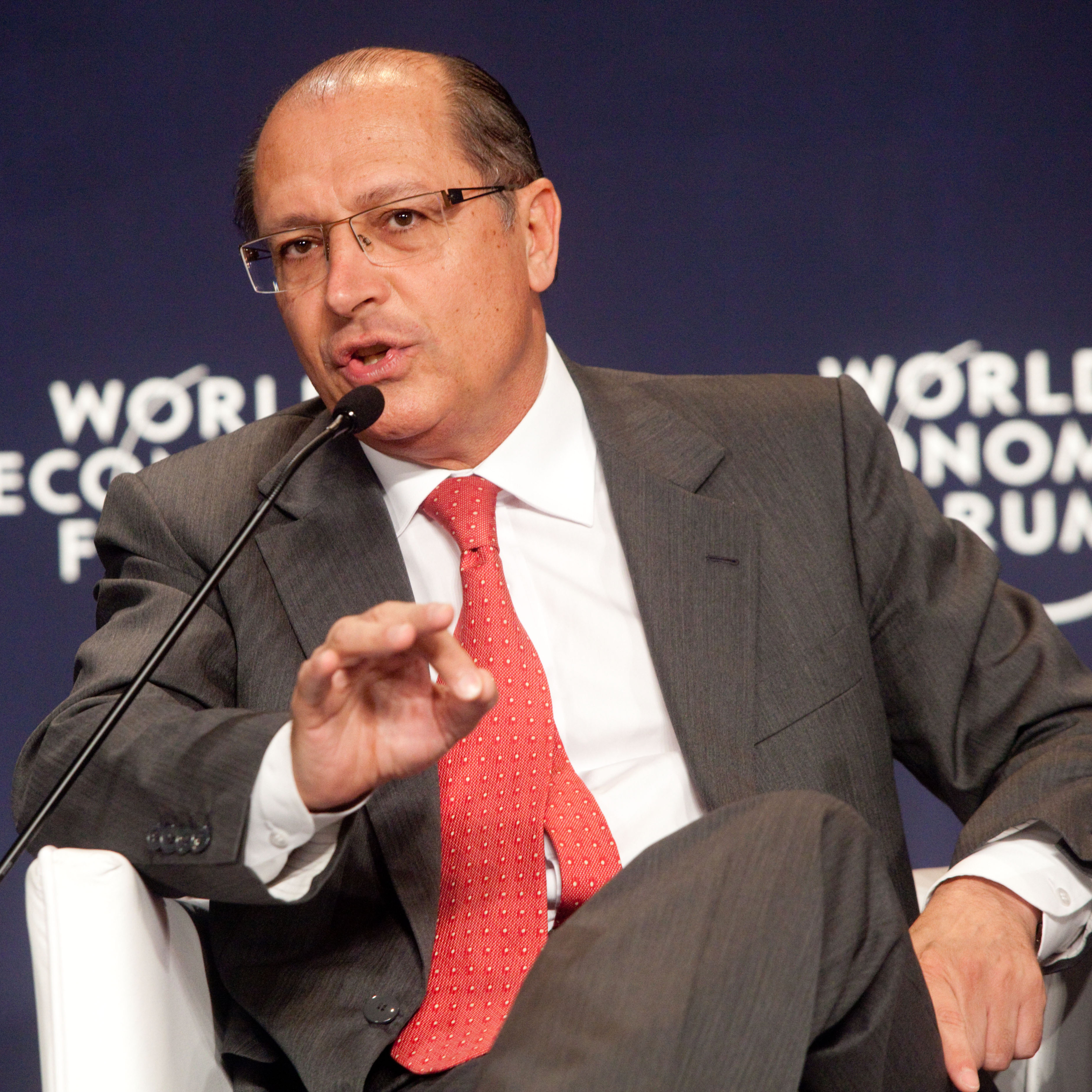
Alckmin at the World Economic Forum Latin America in 2011

While still in his first year of medical school, Alckmin began his political career in 1972 when he was elected to the Pindamonhangaba city council (1973–1977), and then its mayor (1977–1982). At age 25, he was the youngest Brazilian mayor. He was elected a federal deputy for two terms, (1983–1987 and 1987–1994), distinguishing himself by authoring consumer protection laws. In 1988, he was one of the founders of the Brazilian Social Democracy Party (PSDB).

== First term as São Paulo governor (2001–2006) ==
He was elected vice governor of São Paulo, Mário Covas's running-mate first in the 1994 election and then again in 1998. With the death of Covas, he assumed the governorship of the state of São Paulo in March 2001, he continued Covas' policies, investing in large, state-run projects, health and education programs. All of these investments were possible through privatization programs that sold off public and state-owned companies.

He was elected governor on 27 October 2002, through a runoff election, for the 2003–2006 term, with 12 million votes (or 58.64%). His current administration was marked by a reduction in the state payroll from 49% to 46% of the state's budget, the unification of purchasing systems and other "smart spending" initiatives, as well as the implementation of Public-Private Partnerships (PPPs).

== 2006 presidential election ==
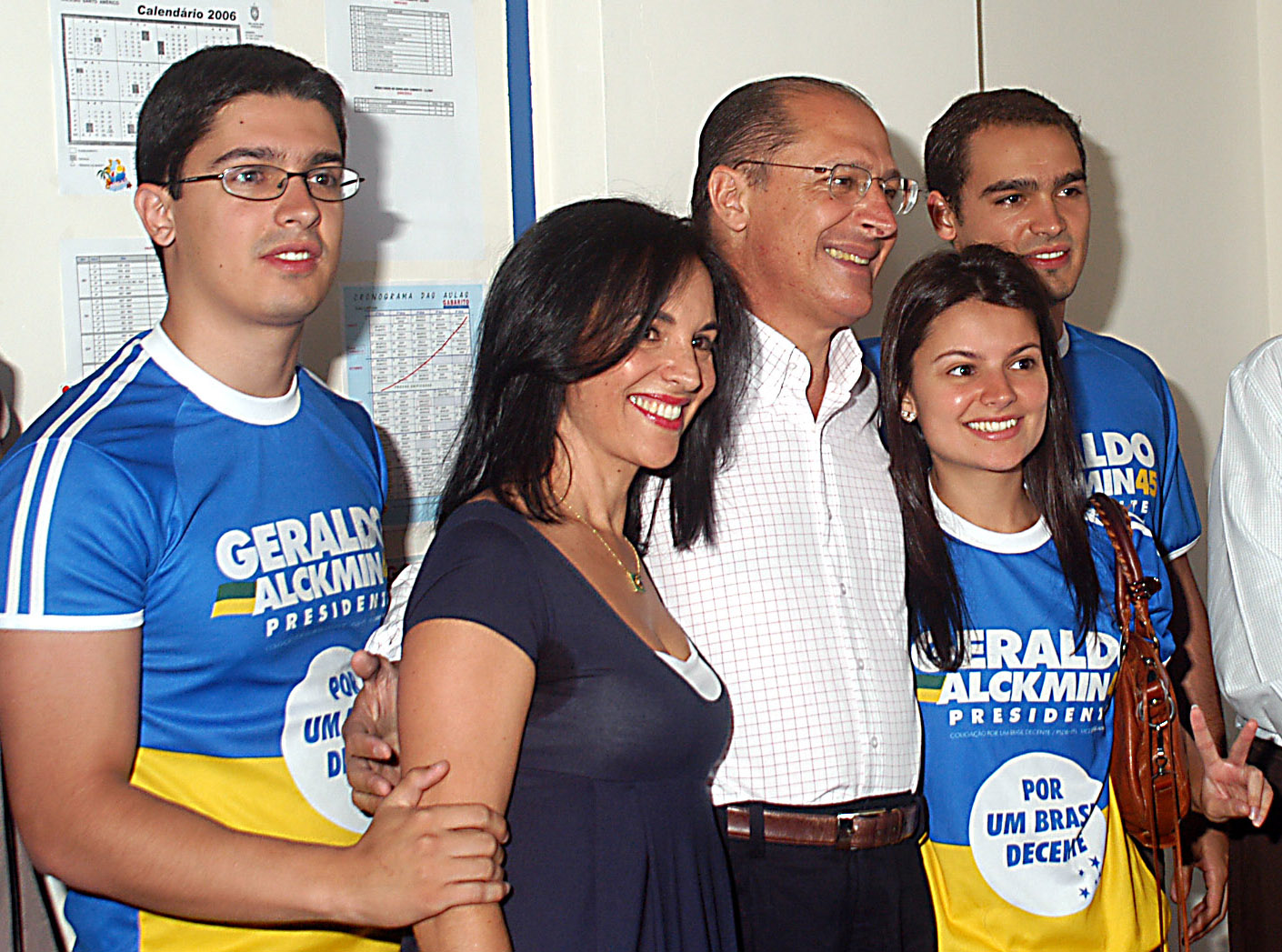
Alckmin and his family during the 2006 presidential campaign

On 14 March 2006, PSDB nominated Alckmin as its candidate for president in the 2006 elections. Because of electoral rules, no candidate running for office may currently be in an executive office, forcing him to resign the governorship on 31 March 2006. Cláudio Lembo, the lieutenant governor, finished Alckmin's term. Alckmin's party mate, José Serra, the PSDB's presidential standard-bearer who lost to Luiz Inácio Lula da Silva in 2002, then announced his candidacy to replace Alckmin in the 2006 state elections. Serra won the vote in Brazil's first round elections on 1 October 2006 and was elected as the governor of São Paulo.

Contrary to all major polls taken in the run-up to the 1 October 2006 balloting, Alckmin surprised almost everyone and came in second place in the presidential election. His 41.64% of the vote, along with votes cast for two less significant candidates, as well as ballots that were left blank or spoiled, was enough to deny the simple majority necessary to re-elect incumbent President Luiz Inácio Lula da Silva ("Lula") in the first round. Lula and Alckmin faced one another in a run-off election on 29 October 2006. Alckmin received 39% of the vote, losing to Lula, who received 61% of the vote and was then reelected.

== Second term as São Paulo governor (2011–2018) ==
=== Return to São Paulo ===
On 19 January 2009, Geraldo was appointed Secretary of Development for the State of São Paulo by then-Governor José Serra.

=== State elections, 2010 ===
At the PSDB convention held on 13 June 2010, Alckmin was officially named the party's candidate for the São Paulo government.

Alckmin was elected governor in the first round with 11.5 million votes (50.63%) defeating Senator Aloizio Mercadante (PT) who obtained 8 million votes (35.23%).

=== Third term as governor, 2011–2014 ===
Alckmin assumed the government of São Paulo for the third time on 1 January 2011. The inauguration took place during a ceremony held at State Legislative Assembly.

His administration in 2013 faces strikes in education and health. After the readjustment in the passage of the metropolitan trains and the subway, great manifestations of protests began, that also happened in all Brazil. The readjustment was later suspended by Alckmin and the mayor of São Paulo, Fernando Haddad.

Alckmin's reelection campaign for 2014 was officialized on 29 June 2014. In the first round, on 5 October 2014, he was re-elected with 12.2 million votes (57.31%), being the second highest percentage of votes since the redemocratization of Brazil.

=== Fourth term as governor, 2015–2018 ===
Alckmin took office for the fourth time as governor of São Paulo on 1 January 2015.

== 2018 presidential campaign ==
In a convention held on 9 December 2017, Alckmin was elected the PSDB's national president in a 470–3 vote, succeeding Minas Gerais senator Aécio Neves, and announced his pre-candidacy for next year's presidential race. On the same day, Alckmin spoke negatively of a potential Lula da Silva candidacy, stating that: "After having broken Brazil, Lula says he wants to return to power, that is, he wants to return to the scene of the crime. We will defeat him at the polls. Lula will be condemned at the polls by the biggest recession in history." On 23 February 2018, after Manaus mayor Arthur Virgílio Neto suspended his campaign, Alckmin became the sole candidate for the party's primary. His candidacy became official on 6 March 2018.

Since resigning as governor and losing his legal immunity, Alckmin has been the target of a probe by electoral justice authorities for allegations that construction company Odebrecht illegally funneled R$10 million into his 2010 and 2014 campaign. He has denied wrongdoing, saying the funds were of "electoral nature" and that the allegation "does not proceed".

In early May 2018, Alckmin announced his campaign communications team, which is headed by Luiz Felipe d'Avila with Lula Guimarães as marketing director. Later that month, he announced his economic advisorial team, which includes Plano Real economists Edmar Bacha and Persio Arida. In late July, Alckmin negotiated a coalition with the "centrão" (big centre), a group of parties in Congress composed of DEM, PP, PR, PRB and SD. On 2 August 2018, Rio Grande do Sul senator Ana Amélia Lemos, a member of PP, was confirmed as Alckmin's running mate in the general election. As the candidate with the largest coalition, Alckmin has secured the longest slot for political ads on free-to-air television channels. As candidate, Alckmin has proposed a smaller government and reduction of taxes, and has defended the labor reform that took place in the administration of President Michel Temer.

== 2022 presidential election ==
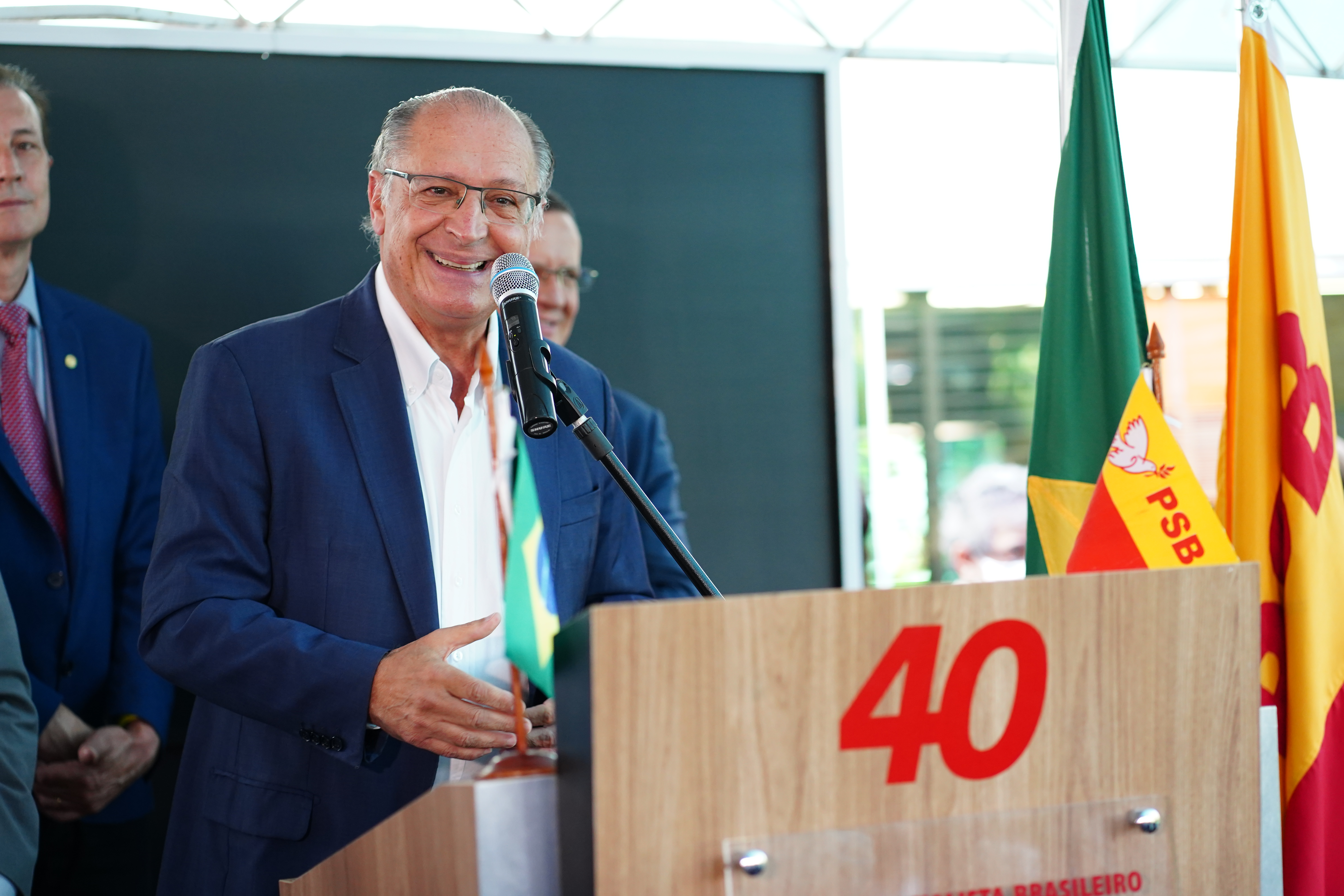
Alckmin, during the affiliation ceremony to the PSB, March 2022

After his defeat in the 2018 elections, Alckmin considered running again for São Paulo governor in 2022. His former ally, São Paulo governor João Doria, launched his vice governor Rodrigo Garcia as the PSDB's candidate for the role. Alckmin considered staying with the PSDB in the case of Eduardo Leite's victory against Doria in the party's presidential primaries. After Doria's victory in November 2021, Alckmin's departure from the party became inevitable.

On 15 December 2021, Alckmin formally announced his departure from the PSDB. After his departure, there were speculations that he would join the Social Democratic Party (PSD) if he decided to run for governor of São Paulo in 2022, or the leftist Brazilian Socialist Party (PSB) if he decided to run for vice president on former president Luiz Inácio Lula da Silva's ticket in the 2022 presidential elections.

In March 2022, Alckmin joined PSB to be Lula's running mate in the 2022 presidential election. The two were formerly rivals in the 2006 Brazilian presidential election, where Alckmin, then a PSDB member, was defeated by Lula in the second round. On 7 May 2022, Alckmin and Lula officially launched the Lula-Alckmin ticket, and on 29 July, he officially affiliated with the PSB and his candidacy for the vice-presidency was finalized. Alckmin's candidacy as vice-president for his former rival, Lula da Silva, had been seen as an attempt by Lula to form a broad front against the re-election of Jair Bolsonaro.

The Lula-Alckmin ticket won the second round of the 2022 elections, on 30 October, defeating the ticket of incumbent President Jair Bolsonaro (PL, of whom Alckmin was seen as more centrist and economically liberal then Bolsonaro himself.) Alckmin took the office of Hamilton Mourão (Republicans).

== Vice President of Brazil (2023–present) ==
On 22 December 2022, Alckmin was announced as the minister of Development, Industry and Foreign Trade in the second presidency of Lula da Silva.

Following the election of Luiz Inácio Lula da Silva as President of Brazil, Alckmin assumed office as vice president of Brazil on 1 January 2023. Alckmin was again selected as Lula's running mate for the 2026 Brazilian presidential election, with the ticket winning the second round, defeating the ticket of Flávio Bolsonaro and Alfredo Gaspar.

== Electoral history ==
Year	Election	Party	Office	Coalition	Partners	Party	Votes	Percent	Result	Ref.
1972	Municipal Elections of Pindamonhangaba	MDB	Councillor	None			1,447	10.00%	Elected	
1976	Pindamonhangaba Mayoral Election	MDB	Mayor	None	Thiers Fernandes Lobo	MDB		23.80%	Elected	
1982	State Elections of São Paulo	MDB	State Deputy	None			96,232	0.91%	Elected	
1986	State Elections of São Paulo	PMDB	Federal Deputy	None			125,127	0.81%	Elected	
1990	State Elections of São Paulo	PSDB	Federal Deputy	None			55,639	0.32%	Elected	
1994	São Paulo Gubernatorial Election	PSDB	Vice-Governor	Commitment to São Paulo (PSDB, PFL)	Mário Covas	PSDB	6,574,517	46.84%	2nd Round	
1994	São Paulo Gubernatorial Election	PSDB	Vice-Governor	Commitment to São Paulo (PSDB, PFL)	Mário Covas	PSDB	8,661,960	56.12%	Elected; 2nd Round	
1998	São Paulo Gubernatorial Election	PSDB	Vice-Governor	São Paulo on the Right Track (PSDB, PTB, PSD)	Mário Covas	PSDB	3,813,186	22.95%	2nd Round	
1998	São Paulo Gubernatorial Election	PSDB	Vice-Governor	São Paulo on the Right Track (PSDB, PTB, PSD)	Mário Covas	PSDB	9,800,253	55.37%	Elected; 2nd Round	
2000	São Paulo Mayoral Election	PSDB	Mayor	Respect for São Paulo (PSDB, PTB, PV, PSD, PRP)	Campos Machado	PTB	952,890	17.26%	Lost; 1st Round	
2002	São Paulo Gubernatorial Election	PSDB	Governor	São Paulo in Good Hands (PSDB, PFL, PSD)	Cláudio Lembo	PFL	7,505,486	38.28%	2nd Round	
2002	São Paulo Gubernatorial Election	PSDB	Governor	São Paulo in Good Hands (PSDB, PFL, PSD)	Cláudio Lembo	PFL	12,008,819	58.64%	Elected; 2nd Round	
2006	Brazilian Presidential Election	PSDB	President	For a Decent Brazil (PSDB, PFL)	José Jorge	PFL	39,968,369	41.62%	2nd Round	
2006	Brazilian Presidential Election	PSDB	President	For a Decent Brazil (PSDB, PFL)	José Jorge	PFL	37,543,178	39.17%	Lost; 2nd Round	
2008	São Paulo Mayoral Election	PSDB	Mayor	São Paulo in the Best Direction (PSDB, PTB, PHS, PSL, PSDC)	Campos Machado	PTB	1,431,670	22.48%	Lost; 1st Round	
2010	São Paulo Gubernatorial Election	PSDB	Governor	United by São Paulo (PSDB, DEM, PMDB, PPS, PSC, PHS, PMN)	Afif Domingos	DEM	11,519,314	50.63%	Elected; 1st Round	
2014	São Paulo Gubernatorial Election	PSDB	Governor	This is São Paulo (PSDB, PSB, DEM, PRB, Solidarity, PPS, PSC, PSL, PEN, PMN, PSDC, PTC, PTN, PTdoB)	Márcio França	PSB	12,230,807	57.31%	Elected; 1st Round	
2018	Brazilian Presidential Election	PSDB	President	To Unite Brazil (PSDB, PP, PTB, PSD, PRB, PR, DEM, Solidarity, PPS)	Ana Amélia	PP	5,096,277	4.76%	Lost; 1st Round	
2022	Brazilian Presidential Election	PSB	Vice-President	Brazil of Hope (Brazil of Hope (PT, PCdoB, PV), PSOL-REDE Federation (PSOL, REDE), PSB, Solidarity, Avante, Act, PROS)	Luiz Inácio Lula da Silva	PT	57,259,504	48.43%	2nd Round	
2022	Brazilian Presidential Election	PSB	Vice-President	Brazil of Hope (Brazil of Hope (PT, PCdoB, PV), PSOL-REDE Federation (PSOL, REDE), PSB, Solidarity, Avante, Act, PROS)	Luiz Inácio Lula da Silva	PT	60,345,999	50.90%	Elected; 2nd Round	
2026	Brazilian Presidential Election	PSB	Vice-President	Brazil Ready for More (Brazil of Hope (PT, PCdoB, PV), PSOL REDE Federation (PSOL, REDE), PSB, PDT)	Luiz Inácio Lula da Silva	PT	53,879,538	45.16%	2nd Round	
2026	Brazilian Presidential Election	PSB	Vice-President	Brazil Ready for More (Brazil of Hope (PT, PCdoB, PV), PSOL REDE Federation (PSOL, REDE), PSB, PDT)	Luiz Inácio Lula da Silva	PT	64,256,232	51.79%	Elected; 2nd Round	

== Notes ==
Political offices
Preceded by João Bosco Nogueira	Mayor of Pindamonhangaba; 1977–1982	Succeeded by Thiers Fernandes Lobo
Preceded by Aloysio Nunes	Vice Governor of São Paulo; 1995–2001	Vacant Title next held by Cláudio Lembo
Preceded by Mário Covas	Governor of São Paulo; 2001–2006	Succeeded by Cláudio Lembo
Preceded by Alberto Goldman	Governor of São Paulo; 2011–2018	Succeeded by Márcio França
Preceded by Hamilton Mourão	Vice President of Brazil; 2023–present	Incumbent
Preceded by Paulo Guedes as Minister of the Economy	Minister of Development, Industry, Trade and Services; 2023–present	Incumbent
Party political offices
Preceded by Mário Covas	PSDB nominee for Governor of São Paulo; 2002	Succeeded by José Serra
Preceded by José Serra	PSDB nominee for President of Brazil; 2006	Succeeded by José Serra
Preceded by José Serra	PSDB nominee for Mayor of São Paulo; 2008	Succeeded by José Serra
Preceded by José Serra	PSDB nominee for Governor of São Paulo; 2010, 2014	Succeeded by João Doria
Preceded by Alberto Goldman; Acting	PSDB National President; 2017–2019	Succeeded by Bruno Araújo
Preceded by Aécio Neves	PSDB nominee for President of Brazil; 2018	Most recent
Lines of succession
First	Brazilian presidential line of succession 1st in line as Vice President of Brazil	Followed by Hugo Motta as President of the Chamber of Deputies
Order of precedence
Preceded by Luiz Inácio Lula da Silva as President of Brazil	Brazilian order of precedence 2nd in order as Vice President of Brazil	Followed by Brazilian cardinals
