= Alberto Goldman =

Brazilian engineer and politician (1937–2019)

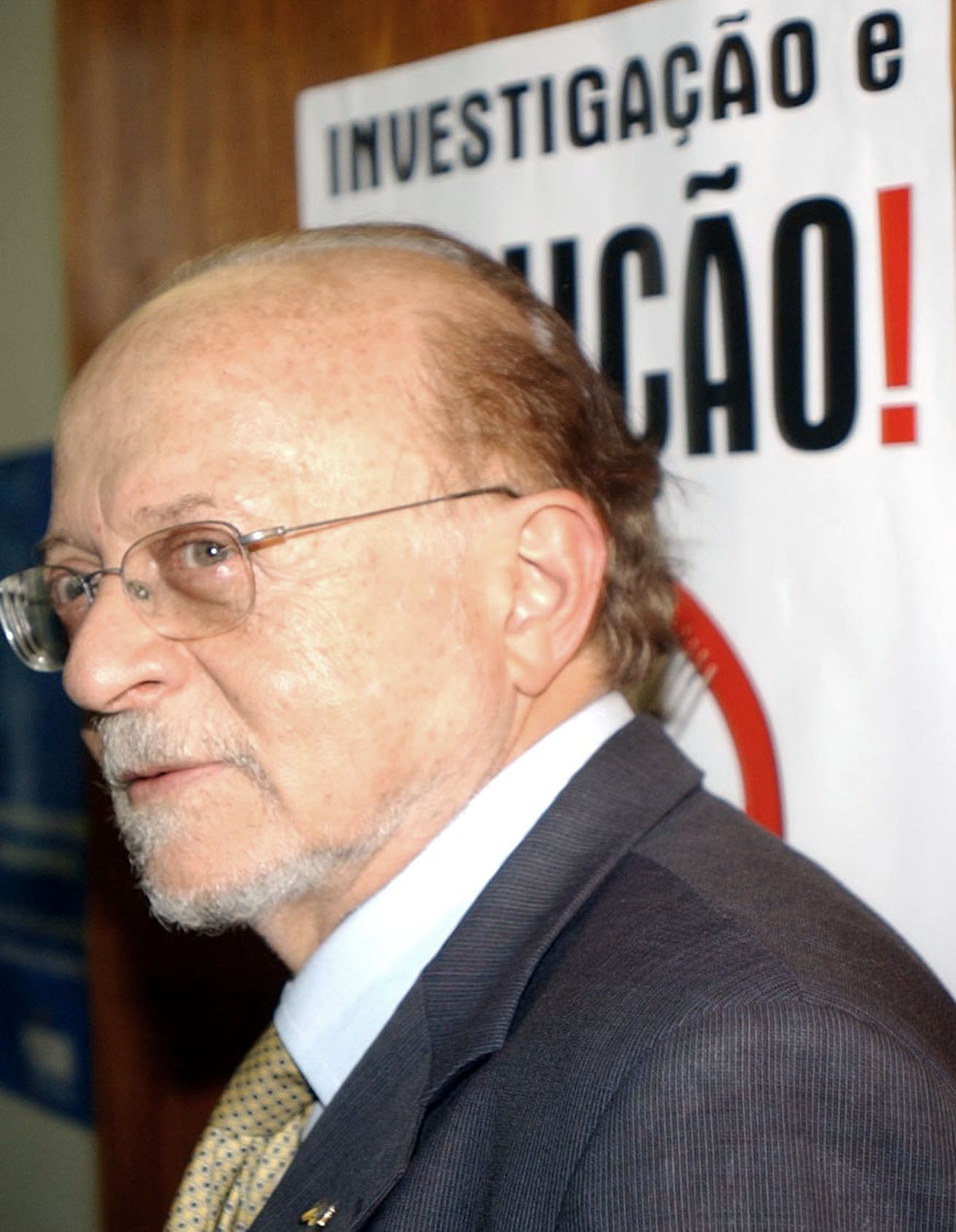

Governor of São Paulo
- In office 2 April 2010 – 1 January 2011
- Lieutenant: Vacant
- Preceded by: José Serra
- Succeeded by: Geraldo Alckmin

Lieutenant Governor of São Paulo
- In office 1 January 2007 – 2 April 2010
- Governor: José Serra
- Preceded by: Cláudio Lembo
- Succeeded by: Afif Domingos

Secretary of Development of São Paulo
- In office 1 January 2007 – 19 January 2009
- Governor: José Serra
- Preceded by: Maria Helena Guimarães de Castro
- Succeeded by: Geraldo Alckmin

Minister of Transport
- In office 2 October 1992 – 21 December 1993
- President: Itamar Franco
- Preceded by: Affonso Camargo Neto
- Succeeded by: Margarida Coimbra do Nascimento

Member of the Chamber of Deputies
- In office 1 February 1991 – 1 January 2007
- Constituency: São Paulo
- In office 1 February 1979 – 1 February 1987
- Constituency: São Paulo

State Deputy of São Paulo
- In office 15 March 1971 – 1 February 1979
- Constituency: At-large

Personal details
- Born: 12 October 1937 São Paulo, Brazil
- Died: 1 September 2019 (aged 81) São Paulo, Brazil
- Party: PCB (1956–1970); MDB (1970–1985); PCB (1985–1987); PMDB (1987–1997); PSDB (1997–2019)
- Spouse: Deuzeni Trisoglio (m. 1977)
- Profession: Engineer

Alberto Goldman (Portuguese pronunciation: [awˈbɛɾtu ˈɡowdmã]; 12 October 1937 – 1 September 2019) was a Brazilian engineer and politician who served as Governor of São Paulo for nine months in 2010 after the resignation of José Serra. He had previously served as Vice Governor of that state from 2007 to 2010.

== Personal life ==
Goldman began studying engineering at the Polytechnic School of the University of São Paulo when he was 18. When the 1964 Brazilian coup d'état took place, he was a militant of the Brazilian Communist Party (PCB). Soon after the AI-5, he became a member of the Brazilian Democratic Movement (MDB).

After the end of the MDB in the late 1970s, he became a member of the Brazilian Democratic Movement Party (PMDB). He went back to PCB but ended up leaving it for PMDB in 1987. From 1992 to 1994, he served as the Transport Minister during the presidency of Itamar Franco. In 1996, he left PMDB and became a member of PSDB and was elected a federal deputy two years later.

He served as governor of the state of São Paulo from April 2010 to January 2011, replacing José Serra who resigned from office in order to run for the presidency in 2010, and was succeeded by the current governor Geraldo Alckmin.

He served as acting National President and National Vice President of the Brazilian Social Democracy Party. He replaced senator Aécio Neves, who was the candidate of the party in the 2014 race for the presidency.

After complications caused by surgery to treat heart disease, Goldman died on 1 September 2019 in Sírio Libanês Hospital, in São Paulo.

Political offices
Preceded by José Serra	Governor of São Paulo; 2010–2011	Succeeded by Geraldo Alckmin
Vacant Title last held by Cláudio Lembo	Vice-Governor of São Paulo; 2007–2010	Vacant Title next held by Guilherme Afif Domingos
Party political offices
Preceded by Tasso Jereissati (acting)	President of the Brazilian Social Democracy Party (acting); 2017	Succeeded by Geraldo Alckmin
Preceded by Geraldo Alckmin	PSDB nominee for Vice-Governor of São Paulo; 2006	Most recent
