= Cláudio Lembo =

Brazilian politician, lawyer and academic (1934–2025)

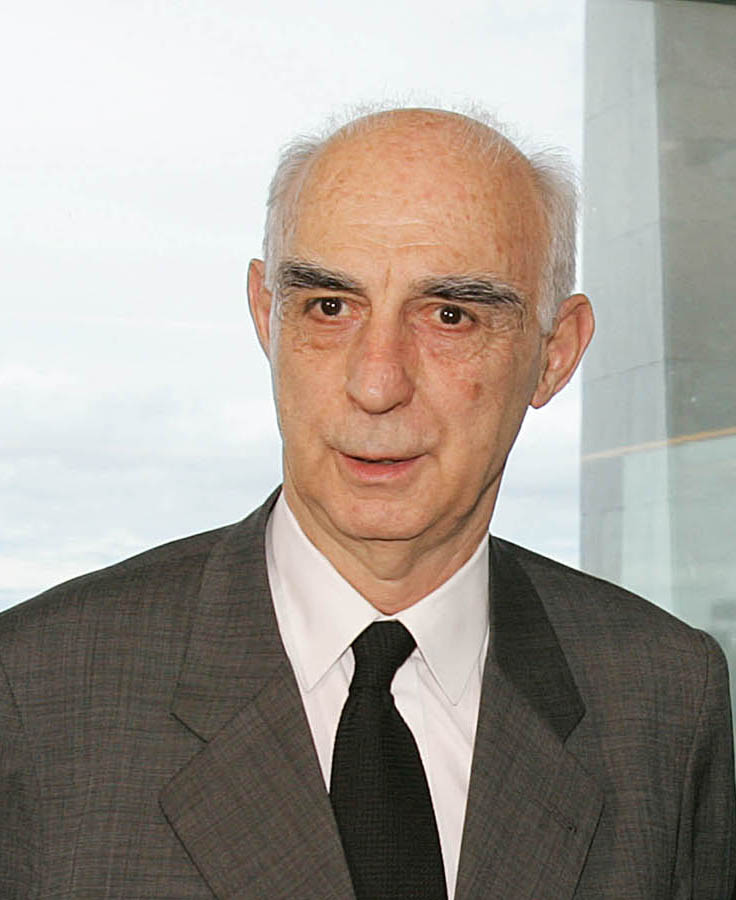

Secretary of Legal Affairs of São Paulo
- In office 28 November 2008 – 1 January 2013
- Mayor: Gilberto Kassab
- Preceded by: Ricardo Dias Leme
- Succeeded by: Luís Fernando Massonetto
- In office 1 January 1986 – 1 January 1989
- Mayor: Jânio Quadros
- Preceded by: José Afonso da Silva
- Succeeded by: Hélio Bicudo

Governor of São Paulo
- In office 31 March 2006 – 1 January 2007
- Lieutenant: Vacant
- Preceded by: Geraldo Alckmin
- Succeeded by: José Serra

Lieutenant Governor of São Paulo
- In office 1 January 2003 – 31 March 2006
- Governor: Geraldo Alckmin
- Preceded by: Geraldo Alckmin
- Succeeded by: Alberto Goldman

Secretary of Planning of São Paulo
- In office 1 January 1993 – 11 March 1993
- Mayor: Paulo Maluf
- Preceded by: Jorge Wilheim
- Succeeded by: Marcos Cintra

Secretary of Extraordinary Affairs of São Paulo
- In office 17 August 1975 – 11 July 1979
- Mayor: Olavo Setúbal
- Preceded by: Luiz Mendonça de Freitas
- Succeeded by: Alex Freua Netto

Personal details
- Born: 12 October 1934 São Paulo, São Paulo, Brazil
- Died: 19 March 2025 (aged 90) São Paulo, São Paulo, Brazil
- Party: ARENA (1966–1980); PMDB (1980–1985); PFL (1985–2007); DEM (2007–2011); PSD (2011–2025)
- Spouse: Renéa de Castilho
- Children: 2
- Education: University of São Paulo (LLB); Mackenzie Presbyterian University (PhD)

Cláudio Salvador Lembo (Brazilian Portuguese pronunciation: [ˈklawdʒu ˈlẽbu]; 12 October 1934 – 19 March 2025) was a Brazilian lawyer, politician, and academic from Neapolitan background. He was elected Vice Governor in 2002 with Governor Geraldo Alckmin. After Alckmin's resignation, to be able to run for the presidency of Brazil in the general elections of October 2006, Lembo became governor of São Paulo on 31 March 2006. His political origins were in the ARENA pro-military party of the 1970s.

Lembo was a professor of constitutional law and civil law at Mackenzie Presbyterian University.

Claydio Lembo died on 19 March 2025, at the age of 90.

Political offices
Vacant Title last held by Geraldo Alckmin	Lieutenant Governor of São Paulo; 2003–2006	Vacant Title next held by Alberto Goldman
Preceded by Geraldo Alckmin	Governor of São Paulo; 2006–2007	Succeeded by José Serra
