= Nelson Carneiro =

Brazilian journalist and politician

President of the Federal Senate of Brazil
- In office 15 March 1989 – 15 March 1995
- Vice-president: Iram Saraiva
- Preceded by: Humberto Lucena
- Succeeded by: Mauro Benevides

Senator of Rio de Janeiro
- In office 15 March 1975 – 31 January 1995

Senator of Guanabara
- In office 1 February 1971 – 15 March 1975

Federal deputy of Guanabara
- In office 14 April 1960 – 31 January 1971

Federal deputy of the Federal District
- In office 1 February 1959 – 14 April 1960

Federal deputy of Bahia
- In office 17 April 1947 – 31 January 1955

Personal details
- Born: Nelson de Souza Carneiro; 8 April 1910 Salvador, Bahia, Brazil
- Died: 6 February 1996 (aged 85) Niterói, Rio de Janeiro, Brazil
- Party: PPB (1995–1996)
- Other political affiliations: See list: UDN (1945–1953); PL (1953–1958); PSD (1958–1965); MDB (1966–1979); PMDB (1980–1982); PTB (1982–1985); PMDB (1985–1993); PP (1993–1995)
- Spouse(s): Juracy Gomes de Souza Carneiro; Maria Luísa Monteza de Souza Carneiro (div.); Carmem Perim Casagrande de Souza Carneiro
- Children: Laura Carneiro
- Relatives: Edison Carneiro (brother)
- Education: Federal University of Bahia

Nelson de Souza Carneiro (8 April 1910 – 6 February 1996) was a Brazilian journalist and politician who had a long career in the federal legislature since the late 1940s, representing various states. He became known for his defense of the right to divorce, which became law in 1977. He is an inductee into the Livro dos Heróis e Heroínas da Pátria.

== Early life and political start in Bahia ==
Carneiro was born in Salvador, Bahia on 8 April 1910, one of 12 children to Antônio Joaquim de Souza Carneiro (the first specialist to discover oil in the region, in the Lobato neighborhood of Salvador) and Laura Coelho de Souza Carneiro. He was the brother of Edison Carneiro, a writer and ethnologist of Afro-Brazilian culture. He began his career in public life as a reporter for O Jornal (linked to the democratic opposition in Bahia) in 1929. He became a lawyer after he graduated from the law school of the Federal University of Bahia (UFBA) in 1932. He was arrested for having supported the Constitutionalist Revolution against the government of Getúlio Vargas, serving time in the former capital Rio de Janeiro.

With the redemocratization of the country in 1945, he became a member of the UDN and ran for a vacancy in the Constituent Assembly meant to write out the new constitution, though he only became a substitute. He went through the political-electoral scuffle and covered the constitutional works for two Bahian newspapers: Jornal da Bahia and O Imparcial. Called on to take office in April 1947, he was reelected in 1950 in a coalition with the PSD. The year after, he proposed his first laws, one dealing with divorce and the other that designated women as on equal standing in marriage with her husband, which resulted in sharp debates with the main adversary of such laws, Padre Arruda Câmara. Affiliating once again with the Liberator Party, he was not reelected in 1954, with his defeat attributed in part to the firm opposition of the Catholic Church to his proposals.

== Political life in Rio de Janeiro ==
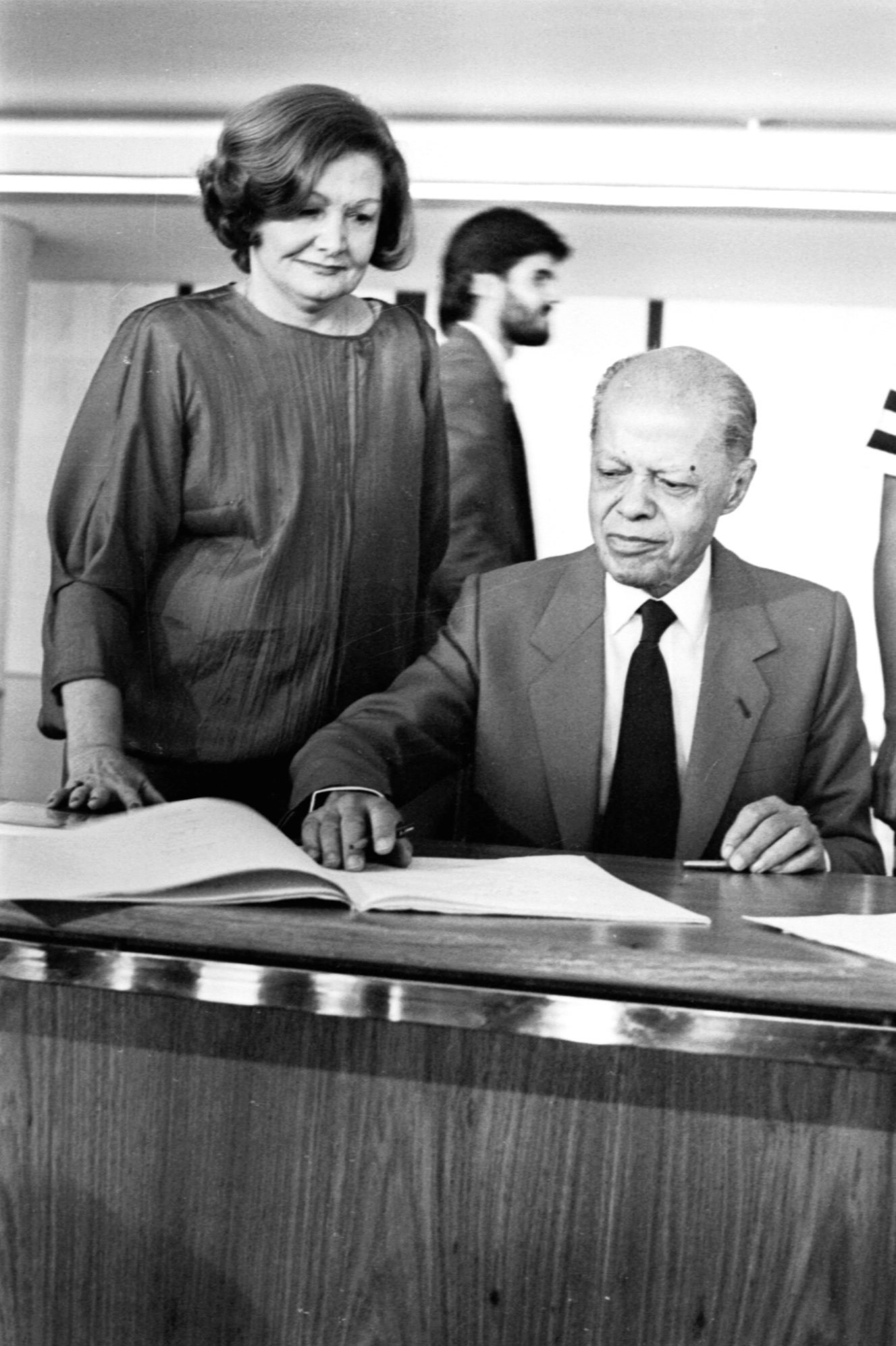
Signing the Brazilian Constitution in 1988 as a member of the National Constituent Assembly (Photo: Célio Azevedo/Agência Senado)

In 1958, Carneiro moved to Rio de Janeiro with the intention to run for elections in what was then the Federal District, betting that a less conservative electorate would be more receptive to his proposals. He was elected as a federal deputy for the PSD in 1958 and, from 21 April 1960 onward, would represent the state of Guanabara, being reelected in 1962.

In the middle of the crisis that was triggered by the resignation of president Jânio Quadros on 25 August 1961, Carneiro was the author of an amendment that implemented parliamentarianism in Brazil in order to secure the swearing in of vice-president João Goulart to the presidency since the government had been in the hands of a prime minister, in this case Tancredo Neves. With the deposing of Goulart through a military coup on 31 March 1964, and the subsequent implementation of the military dictatorship, Carneiro became a member of the MDB and was reelected in 1966. He was elected as a senator for Guanabara in 1970, later on representing the state of Rio de Janeiro after the fusion of the two federative entities on 15 March 1975 due to laws sanctioned by president Ernesto Geisel.

On 8 June 1967, in the Chamber of Deputies, Carneiro retaliated against a slap by deputy Estácio Souto Maior after they had argued over the presidency of the Parliamentary Union a few days earlier, by shooting Souto Maior. Both survived and were later acquitted.

Carneiro began to fight for the right to divorce in 1951 after receiving letters from hundreds of women to pursue the matter. After 26 years fighting for the law, Carneiro was able to pass Law 6.515 that legalized divorce in Brazil on 26 December 1977, and for which the law still endures by way of changes through a quorum to yield approvals of constitutional amendments, that passed by a two thirds majority relative to the number of members of Congress elected due to the Pacote de Abril being lowered by the government.

Reelected in 1978, he presided over the orientation of governor Chagas Freitas, who founded the Partido Popular, and would affiliate with the PTB, founded by Ivete Vargas. The party’s run to become governor of the state of Rio de Janeiro in 1982 saw Sandra Cavalcanti as their candidate, an adversary of Carneiro. During the indirect presidential election of 1985, Carneiro voted for Tancredo Neves. On returning to collaborate with old acquaintances, he became a member of the PMDB and disputed the party convention for their nomination for governor. However, the nomination of Moreira Franco led him to dispute a third term for senator in 1986, where he was reelected.

A member of the National Constituent Assembly which led to the ratification of the Constitution of 1988, and was later elected president of the Federal Senate the following year, as Fernando Collor took office as president on 15 March 1990. Carneiro ran for governor of Rio de Janeiro in 1990 and came in third place, with Leonel Brizola winning. He ran again for senator as a member of the Progressistas in 1994, but was not reelected.

== Personal life and death ==
Carneiro married his first wife, Juracy Gomes de Souza Carneiro, in 1938. After becoming a widow, Carneiro later married Maria Luísa Monteza de Souza Carneiro, a native of Peru, with whom they had a daughter, Laura Carneiro. After divorcing her, he went on to marry Carmem Perim Casagrande de Souza Carneiro. He died on 6 February 1996 in Niterói.

== Legacy ==
On 9 July 2016, the 1400m tunnel of the Transolímpica extension was named Túnel Senador Nelson Carneiro, in the Serra do Engelho Velho neighborhood of Rio de Janeiro. In the Cidade Tiradentes neighborhood in the eastern edge of São Paulo, there is a road named after Carneiro.
