= Therezinha Zerbini =

Brazilian attorney and feminist leader (1928–2015)

Therezinha Zerbini ORB
- Born: Therezinha de Godoy Zerbini; 16 April 1928; São Paulo, Brazil
- Died: 14 March 2015 (aged 86); São Paulo, Brazil
- Occupations: Social assistant; lawyer; human rights activist
- Organization: Women's Movement for Amnesty
- Spouse: Euryale de Jesus Zerbini (died 1982)
- Awards: Order of Rio Branco (Commander)

Therezinha de Jesus Zerbini ORB (née de Godoy Zerbini; 12 December 1928 – 14 March 2015) was a Brazilian attorney, feminist leader, and founder of the Women's Movement for Amnesty in Brazil. Zerbini chronicled contemporary Brazilian history, reporting on civilians and politicians who had been imprisoned, tortured, and persecuted by the dictatorship, which was systematically denied by the military authorities.

Zerbini was a political prisoner who occupied the same cell as president Dilma Rousseff in the Tiradentes State Prison. The amnesty movement was greatly enhanced when the Brazilian Committee for Amnesty (CBA) in Rio de Janeiro was launched, formed by lawyers of political prisoners demanding a broad, general, and unrestricted amnesty, promoted by the Order of Attorneys of Brazil, in February 1978. The following month, Zerbini risked her life in an attempt to deliver a letter to American president Jimmy Carter.

In 1979, Zerbini stood by Leonel Brizola, member of the Brazilian Labor Party (PTB) in São Paulo and founder of the Democratic Labor Party (PDT), when the acronym of the party was lost to Ivete Vargas. Despite her clear position against the military dictatorship, Zerbini also signed the "Manifesto for the Defense of Democracy", coordinated by national personalities, intellectuals, and politicians in reaction to the political practices of the Lula government, thus supporting the democrat Jose Serra.

== Life ==
Zerbni met her husband, Euryale Jesus Zerbini, twenty years her senior, in 1951, when he commanded the security forces in São Paulo. He was the brother of cardiologist Euryclides de Jesus Zerbini. At the time, she was a social worker at the Mandaqui Hospital, which cared for children with tuberculosis.

Euryale Zerbini, commanding the Caçapava unit at the time of the 1964 Brazilian coup d'état, was one of four generals to take a legalist position against the army coup. His political rights were revoked over this. Therezinha Zerbini was required to respond to a military police investigation for helping Frei Tito to get a sitio in Ibiúna, owned by a friend of the Zerbini family, which would be the place where the União Nacional dos Estudantes Congress (an organization outlawed by the military regime) was to be held. She was indicted in December 1969 and convicted under the National Security Act, spending eight months in prison, six of them in the Tiradentes prison in São Paulo, where she lived with then-gerrilheira Dilma Rousseff.

In 1975, Therezinha Zerbini founded the Female Movement for Amnesty (Movimento Feminino pela Anistia, MFPA), which issued a manifesto for general amnesty, managing to gather 16,000 signatures supporting the cause. She dealt with complaints regarding imprisonment, torture, and political persecution, a fact systematically denied by the Brazilian military government. Thereafter, the MFPA began forming committees for amnesty in major cities throughout the country.

== Female Movement for Amnesty ==
The opposition group MFPA was founded at a time when guerrilla warfare had erupted in Brazil. At the same time, the reorganization of Brazilian society and citizens' electoral participation, even under limitations, were valued as a "means in itself" for achieving a real democracy. The movement was considered a landmark when political activity returned to public spaces, aggregating and mobilizing various sectors of Brazilian society, such as the Brazilian Democratic Movement (MDB), the Brazilian Communist Party (PCB), and other political parties still considered illegal entities, as well as the Christian left, academic personnel, trade associations, and Brazilians living in exile, such as political prisoners and their families. The MFPA was a legalized movement with founding documents and a legal statute recorded in 1976, consisting mainly of Catholic women such as Zerbini and other middle-class activists. In this sense, Zerbini created opposition from inside the regime, playing against its own initial justification, thus attempting to preserve a democracy threatened by totalitarianism. In February 1978, the movement was expanded with the creation of the Brazilian Committee for Amnesty (Comite Brasileiro pela Anistia, CBA) in Rio de Janeiro. Formed initially by lawyers of political prisoners in support of the Order of Attorneys of Brazil, the CBA called for an immediate broad amnesty. The following month, during the visit of then-US President Jimmy Carter to Brasília, Zerbini was able to break through US security around the president and deliver a letter to the First Lady, Rosalynn Carter, on behalf of Brazilian women and the movement for amnesty.

== Political activism after the amnesty ==
After the revocation of the AI-5 in 1978, Zerbini stood by Leonel Brizola in the rebuilding process of the Brazilian Labour Party in São Paulo, and then in the foundation of the Democratic Labour Party in 1979. More recently, in September 2010, just before the presidential elections in November, Zerbini was the fifth person to sign the "Manifesto for the Defence of Democracy", issued by intellectuals and politicians opposed to the Workers' Party.

== Awards ==
Bertha Lutz Prize (Diploma Woman-Citizen Bertha Lutz)
