= Laura Carneiro =

Brazilian politician

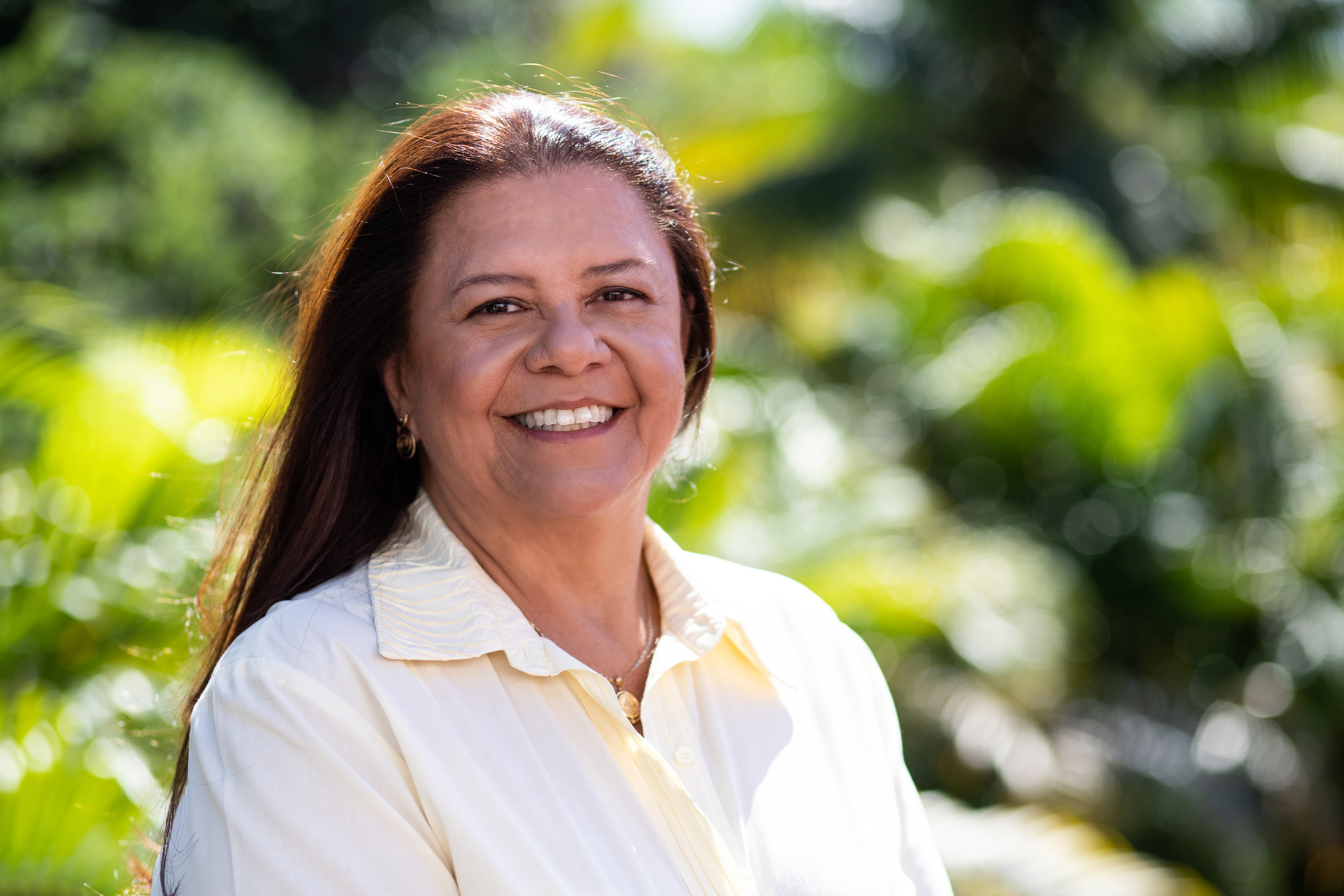

Federal deputy of Rio de Janeiro
- Incumbent
- Assumed office 1 February 2023
- In office 27 October 2015 – 1 February 2019
- In office 1 February 1995 – 1 February 2007

Councilwoman of Rio de Janeiro
- In office 1 January 2021 – 1 January 2023
- In office 1 January 2013 – 27 October 2015
- In office 1 January 1989 – 1 February 1995

Personal details
- Born: Maria Laura Monteza de Souza Carneiro; 1 May 1961 (age 65) Rio de Janeiro, Brazil
- Party: PSD (2022–present)
- Other political affiliations: See list: PSDB (1988–1990); PMDB (1990–1993); PP (1993–1995); PPB (1995); PFL (1995–2007); DEM (2007–2009); PTB (2009–2015); MDB (2015–2018); DEM (2018–2022); UNIÃO (2022); PL (2022)
- Parent: Nelson Carneiro (father)
- Relatives: Edison Carneiro (uncle)
- Education: Rio de Janeiro State University

Maria Laura Monteza de Souza Carneiro (born 1 May 1963) is a Brazilian lawyer and politician. She has been a councilwoman in the city of Rio de Janeiro, as well as a federal deputy for the state of Rio de Janeiro, in on and off terms since the 1980s. She started her current term as federal deputy in 2023.

== Biography ==
Carneiro began her career becoming a parliamentary advisor for Ulysses Guimarães, the then president of the Brazilian Constituent Assembly of 1988. A year after, in 1989, she was elected to her first mandate as city councilwoman of Rio de Janeiro, at 25 years old. Since then, she has been elected councilwoman two other times and has had three other consecutive mandates in the Chamber of Deputies.

She is the daughter of Nelson Carneiro, former senator and ex-president of the National Congress, and his wife, Maria Luísa Monteza de Souza Carneiro, who was of Peruvian origin. He was the author of the first amendment that instituted a parliamentary system in Brazil, after having been jailed by the military dictatorship. He also wrote the country's divorce laws, after 30 years fighting for such provisions. Her uncle was writer and ethnologist on Afro-Brazilian culture Edison Carneiro. Laura graduated with a law degree from Rio de Janeiro State University (UERJ) in 1985.

=== Parliamentary career ===
Carneiro was the Municipal Secretary of Social Development before she was 30. She was the co-author of proposals related to Statutes relating to the elderly. She has presented more than a thousand propositions since her first mandate as councilwoman in 1989, mainly relating to combatting violence against women, having also firmly making efforts behind the scenes in Congress to approve the Maria da Penha law.

In 2017 and 2018, she was the vice-president of the Commission for the Defense of Women's Rights, vice-president of the Joint Budget Commission, and was the vice-leader of the MDB in the Chamber of Deputies, but was removed from her position for having voted in favor of an investigation into corruption allegations against then-president Michel Temer.

Carneiro is the lone politician in Brazil to have had 6 laws sanctioned in less than two years. This includes Law 13.413/17, creating comprehensive legislation to protect the rights of children and adolescent victims and witnesses of violence.

While on the commission on the Defense of the Rights of Women, she helped to increase the penalties for collective and punitive rape, as well as other forms of rape that were not already determined in the Brazilian Penal Code. She helped to codify the crime of releasing media showing rape. She created the criminal offense of sexual importuning and passed laws that stripped men who killed their wives, beat their children, or committed sexual abuse of their rights within the family. She is also the author of laws that authorized the commercialization of anorectics to treat obesity, as well as the law that disposed of the national energy policy that had brought $3 billion reais to the state of Rio de Janeiro annually.

Carneiro was also able to approve laws that banned child marriage in Brazil, as well as laws regulating the release by telephone services about cases related to violence against women, in relation to Poder Público that had intensively advertised of Disque 180 in public and private in great circulation.

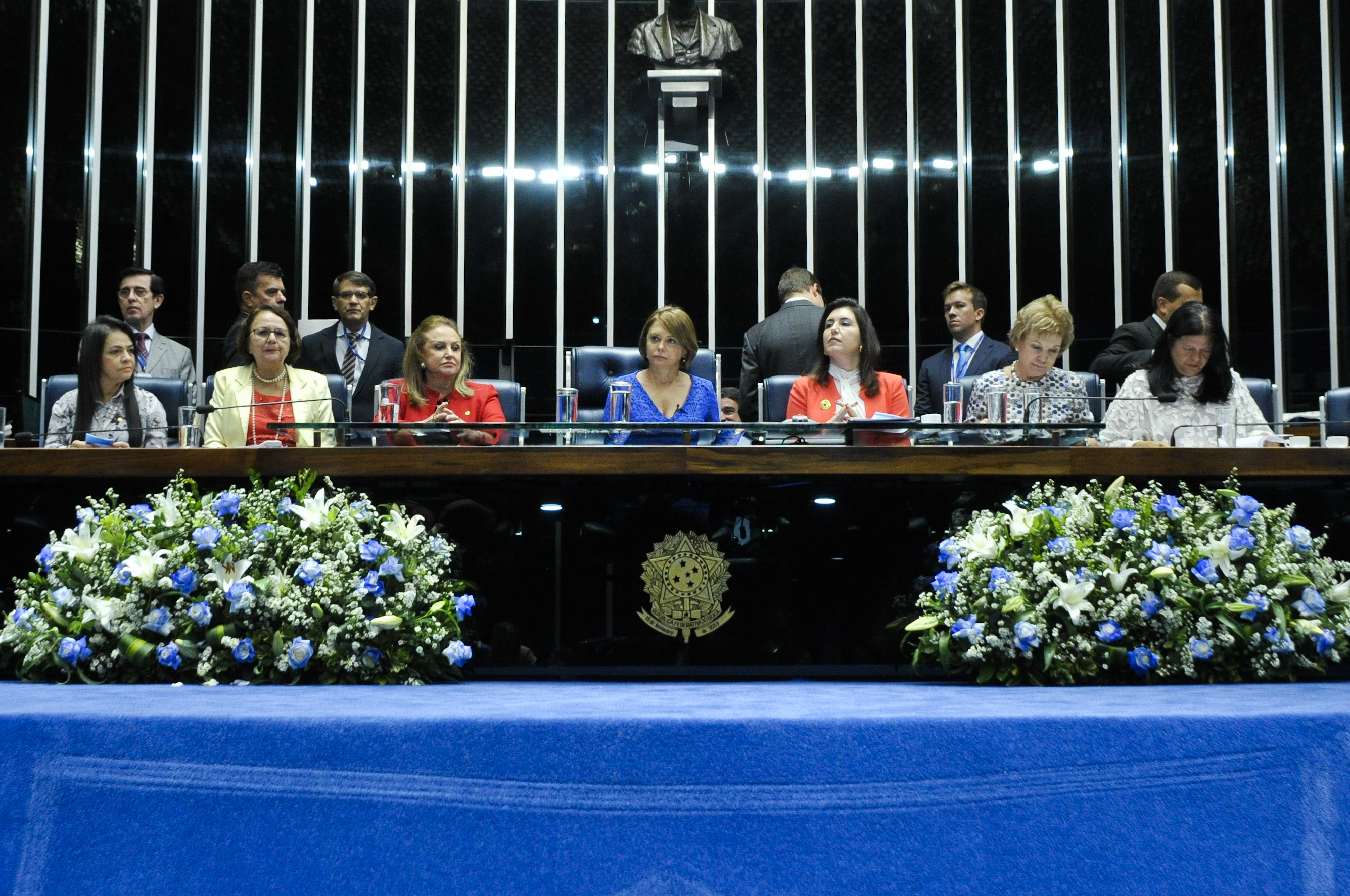
Laura Carneiro overseeing the Managing Table of the Chamber during a "Sessão Solene" to commemorate International Women's Day

Carneiro would later introduce bills that includes as civil identifications for gender male, female, or undetermined, as prescribed by the Brazilian Constitution in reference to the dignity of citizens relating to gender expression, along with promoting a series for public meetings on the subject. From October 2015 to November 2016, she became a member of five permanent commissions in the Chamber, most notably the commission on Women's Rights. She had become most well known on the commission for their analysis of PEC 134/15, which reserves a minimum percent for female representation in the Legislative branch. She would eventually become a member of more than 10 special commissions, highlighting to put forth resources for the 2016 Summer Olympics and Paralympics in Rio de Janeiro that year, as well as her coordinating the attempt to resolve the fiscal crisis hitting the state of Rio de Janeiro.

She would later become the rapporteur of the Federal Intervention in Rio de Janeiro, as well as vice-president of the Joint Budgeting Commission. During her latest term, she introduced more than 100 proposals and two Constitutional Amendments. Carneiro also became a member of the Brazilian delegation to the Latin American Parliament, an organization that unites national parliaments in Latin America that are elected democratically by popular vote, of which she served as president. She also was a substitute member for the 8 January CPMI.

In 2023, she was recognized by the Order of Attorneys of Brazil for her work in advocating for the rights of women in Brazil.

== Electoral history ==
Year	Election	Coalition	Party	Position	Vote	Result
1988	Rio de Janeiro Municipal Elections	Rio, Amanhã Melhor (PSDB, PCdoB)	PSDB	Councilwoman	7,837	Won
1992	Rio de Janeiro Municipal Elections	Pensa Rio (PMDB, PMSD, PL)	PMDB	Councilwoman	12,214 (0.44%)	Won
1994	Rio de Janeiro State Elections	Rio Unido (PSDB, PFL, PP, PL)	PP	Federal deputy	34,932 (0.77%)	Won
1998	Rio de Janeiro State Elections	Governo de Verdade (PFL, PPB, PTB)	PFL	Federal deputy	83,124 (1.17%)	Won
2002	Rio de Janeiro State Elections	Todos pelo Rio (PFL, PMDB, PSDB)	PFL	Federal deputy	62,472 (0.85%)	Won
2006	Rio de Janeiro State Elections	no coalition	PFL	Federal deputy	29,495 (0.40%)	Lost (substitute)
2010	Rio de Janeiro State Elections	PTB, PTN, PSDC, PHS, PTC	PTB	Federal deputy	29,354 (0.37%)	Lost (substitute)
2012	Rio de Janeiro Municipal Elections	no coalition	PTB	Councilwoman	14,621 (0.47%)	Won
2014	Rio de Janeiro State Elections	PMDB, PP, PSC, PSD, PTB	PTB	Federal deputy	34,550 (0.49%)	Lost (substitute)
2018	Rio de Janeiro State Elections	O Rio quer paz (DEM, MDB, PP, PTB)	DEM	Federal deputy	40,212 (0.57%)	Lost (substitute)
2020	Rio de Janeiro Municipal Elections	no coalition	DEM	Councilwoman	14,646 (0.60%)	Won
2022	Rio de Janeiro State Elections	no coalition	PSD	Federal deputy	48,073 (0.58%)	Won
