= List of political parties in Brazil =

Brazil has a multi-party system since 1979, when the country's military dictatorship disbanded an enforced two-party system and allowed the creation of multiple parties. All candidates for federal, state, municipal, and Federal District offices must be nominated by a political party. Independent politicians are not allowed to run for office in Brazil.

The Brazilian National Congress has been since characterized by political fragmentation, reaching a peak of 35 registered political parties in 2018, 30 of which were represented in congress after the 2018 general election, with an effective number of parties of 16.5. An electoral threshold introduced in 2017, which restricted access to party subsidies and free party political broadcasts, combined with the end of coalitions in proportional elections, has since caused this number to decrease. Since 2021, parties are allowed to unite under party federations, with a minimum duration of four years, sharing a common statute and leadership.

Since the 2022 general election, the Liberal Party (PL), the Workers' Party (PT), the Brazil Union (UNIÃO), the Progressives (PP), the Social Democratic Party (PSD), the Brazilian Democratic Movement (MDB) and the Republicans together control over 80% of the Brazilian Congress, along with over 70% of the mayors in municipalities.

Brazilian parties have access to party subsidies in the form of Fundo Partidário (lit. 'Party Fund') and Fundo Eleitoral (lit. 'Electoral Fund'), and a system of free party political broadcasts during election time known as the horário eleitoral gratuito.

Since 1982, Brazilian political parties have been given an electoral number to make it easier for illiterate people to vote. Initially, it was a one-digit number: 1 for PDS, 2 for PDT, 3 for PT, 4 for PTB, and 5 for PMDB. When it became clear that there was going to be more than nine parties, two-digit numbers were assigned, with the first five parties having a "1" added to their former one-digit number (PDS becoming number 11, PDT 12, PT 13, PTB 14, and PMDB 15). Political parties often change their names, but they can retain their number.

== Active parties ==
=== Parties with representation in the National Congress ===
Logo	Party		Ideology	Political position	President	Chamber	Senate	Assemblies	Governors
	Liberal Party; Partido Liberal	PL	Bolsonarism; National conservatism (Brazil); Right-wing populism; Historical: Liberalism (Brazilian); Social liberalism; Big tent	Right-wing to far-right	Valdemar Costa Neto	121 / 513	29 / 81	128 / 1,059	2 / 27
	Workers' Party; Partido dos Trabalhadores	PT	Social democracy; Progressivism; Lulism	Centre-left	Edinho Silva	70 / 513	9 / 81	118 / 1,059	4 / 27
	Brazil Union; União Brasil	UNIÃO	Liberal conservatism; Economic liberalism; Social conservatism	Centre-right	Antônio de Rueda	46 / 513	5 / 81	98 / 1,059	4 / 27
	Social Democratic Party; Partido Social Democrático	PSD	Economic liberalism; Big tent	Centre	Gilberto Kassab	43 / 513	5 / 81	79 / 1,059	4 / 27
	Progressives; Progressistas	PP	Conservative liberalism	Centre-right	Ciro Nogueira	41 / 513	6 / 81	86 / 1,059	2 / 27
	Republicans; Republicanos	Repub.	Conservatism; Christian right; Economic liberalism	Right-wing	Marcos Pereira	41 / 513	6 / 81	76 / 1,059	2 / 27
	Brazilian Democratic Movement; Movimento Democrático Brasileiro	MDB	Economic liberalism; Neoliberalism; Big tent	Centre to centre-right; Historical: Centre to centre-left	Baleia Rossi	36 / 513	8 / 81	94 / 1,059	3 / 27
	We Can; Podemos	PODE	Economic liberalism; Anti-corruption; Direct democracy; Historically: Labourism; Janismo	Centre-right	Renata Abreu	27 / 513	2 / 81	48 / 1,059	0 / 27
	Brazilian Socialist Party; Partido Socialista Brasileiro	PSB	Social liberalism; Social democracy; Progressivism; Historical: Democratic socialism; Christian socialism	Centre to centre-left Historically: Left-wing	João Henrique Campos	15 / 513	4 / 81	54 / 1,059	3 / 27
	Socialism and Liberty Party; Partido Socialismo e Liberdade	PSOL	Democratic socialism; Socialism of the 21st century; Progressivism	Left-wing to far-left	Paula Coradi	14 / 513	0 / 81	22 / 1,059	0 / 27
	Brazilian Social Democracy Party; Partido da Social Democracia Brasileira	PSDB	Third Way; Social liberalism; Neoliberalism; Historical: Social democracy	Centre to Centre-right; Historical, now faction: Centre to centre-left	Marconi Perillo	11 / 513	2 / 81	55 / 1,059	1 / 27
	Communist Party of Brazil; Partido Comunista do Brasil	PCdoB	Communism (Brazilian); Developmentalism; Historical: Maoism; Hoxhaism	Centre-left to left-wing Historically: Far-left	Luciana Santos	11 / 513	0 / 81	18 / 1,059	0 / 27
	New Party; Partido Novo	NOVO	Conservative liberalism; Libertarianism	Far-right	Eduardo Ribeiro	10 / 513	3 / 81	5 / 1,059	1 / 27
	Green Party; Partido Verde	PV	Green politics	Centre to left-wing	José Luiz Penna	7 / 513	0 / 81	20 / 1,059	0 / 27
	Democratic Labour Party; Partido Democrático Trabalhista	PDT	Social democracy; Social liberalism; Democratic socialism; Left-wing nationalism; Left-wing populism; Labourism; Getulism	Centre-left; Historical: Left-wing	Carlos Lupi	6 / 513	1 / 81	44 / 1,059	0 / 27
	Democratic Renewal Party; Partido Renovação Democrática	PRD	National conservatism	Right-wing	Marcus Vinícius Neskau	5 / 513	0 / 81	25 / 1,059	0 / 27
	Forward; Avante	Avante	Labourism; Christian solidarism	Centre	Luis Tibé	5 / 513	0 / 81	14 / 1,059	0 / 27
	Solidarity; Solidariedade	Solid.	Social democracy; Third Way; Labourism	Centre	Paulinho da Força	2 / 513	0 / 81	29 / 1,059	1 / 27
	Sustainability Network; Rede Sustentabilidade	REDE	Environmentalism; Progressivism; Eco-socialism; Neoliberalism	Centre-left to left-wing	Paulo Lamac; Iaraci Dias	1 / 513	0 / 81	6 / 1,059	0 / 27
	Mission Party; Partido Missão	MISSÃO	The Yellow Book: Conservative liberalism; Social conservatism; National liberalism; Brazilian nationalism; Technocapitalism; Bukelism; Enemy criminal law; Law and order; Fiscalism	Right-wing to far-right	Renan Santos	1 / 513	0 / 81	1 / 1,059	0 / 27

=== Parties without representation in the National Congress ===
Logo	Party		Ideology	Political position	President	Assemblies
	Citizenship; Cidadania	Cidad.	Social liberalism; Parliamentarism; Federalism; Historically: Social democracy; Democratic socialism	Centre to centre-right; Historical: Centre-left	Roberto Freire	19 / 1,059
	Brazilian Labour Renewal Party; Partido Renovador Trabalhista Brasileiro	PRTB	Brazilian nationalism; Conservatism; Social conservatism; Fiscal conservatism; Militarism; Janism; Christian right; Right-wing antiglobalism; Right-wing populism	Far-right	Leonardo Avalanche	6 / 1,059
	Act; Agir	AGIR	Autistic people's interests; Historical: Conservatism; Christian democracy; Economic liberalism; During Collor's Presidency: Conservatism; Reformism; Neoliberalism; Neopopulism; Economic liberalism; Pro-free markets; Social liberalism; Democratic capitalism; Social capitalism; Keynesianism; Anti-Third Way	Centre; Historical: Right-wing	Daniel Tourinho	5 / 1,059
	National Mobilization; Mobilização Nacional	Mobiliza	Brazilian nationalism; Civic nationalism; Historical: Third-worldism	Centre-right; Historical: Centre-left	Antonio Massarollo	5 / 1,059
	Democrat; Democrata		Social conservatism	Center-right	Suêd Haidar	3 / 1,059
	Christian Democracy; Democracia Cristã	DC	Christian democracy; Catholic social teaching; Paternalistic conservatism	Centre-right	José Maria Eymael	1 / 1,059
	Workers' Cause Party; Partido da Causa Operária	PCO	Communism; Marxism; Trotskyism; Socialist patriotism; Left conservatism	Left-wing to far-left	Rui Costa Pimenta	—N/a
	Brazilian Communist Party; Partido Comunista Brasileiro	PCB	Communism (Brazilian); Marxism–Leninism	Far-left	Edmilson Costa	—N/a
	United Socialist Workers' Party; Partido Socialista dos Trabalhadores Unificado	PSTU	Anti-capitalism; Communism; Socialism; Trotskyism; Internationalism; Morenism	Left-wing to far-left	Zé Maria	—N/a
	Popular Unity; Unidade Popular	UP	Socialism	Left-wing	Léo Péricles	—N/a

== Party federations ==
On 28 September 2021, Law No. 14,208 was enacted, establishing "federations" (Portuguese: federações). These federations are associations between parties, considered as a single party in elections and legislative activities such as the creation of caucuses and committees. The associated parties must belong to the federation for at least four years from the date of its registration, with penalties if they leave before the deadline.

The establishment of party federations followed the abolition of coalitions in proportional elections, which allowed parties to function as single in seat allocation. This change was implemented through Constitutional Amendment No. 97 of 2017, which also introduced an electoral threshold for future parliamentary elections. Parties and federations that surpass this threshold gain access to public subsidies through the Party Fund (Portuguese: Fundo Partidário) and are entitled to free advertising on radio and television.

Below are listed the federations currently registered with the Superior Electoral Court:

Federation	President	Representation			Parties
Federation	President	Deputies	Senators	Assemb.	Parties
Brazil of Hope Federation; Federação Brasil da Esperança	José Luiz Penna	88 / 513	9 / 81	156 / 1,059	PT
Brazil of Hope Federation; Federação Brasil da Esperança	José Luiz Penna	88 / 513	9 / 81	156 / 1,059	PCdoB
Brazil of Hope Federation; Federação Brasil da Esperança	José Luiz Penna	88 / 513	9 / 81	156 / 1,059	PV
Progressive Union; Federação União Progressista	Antônio Rueda; Ciro Nogueira	87 / 513	11 / 81	186 / 1,060	UNIÃO
Progressive Union; Federação União Progressista	Antônio Rueda; Ciro Nogueira	87 / 513	11 / 81	186 / 1,060	PP
PSOL REDE Federation; Federação PSOL REDE	Paula Coradi	15 / 513	0 / 81	28 / 1,060	PSOL
PSOL REDE Federation; Federação PSOL REDE	Paula Coradi	15 / 513	0 / 81	28 / 1,060	REDE
PSDB Cidadania Federation; Federação PSDB Cidadania	Aécio Neves	11 / 513	2 / 81	74 / 1,060	PSDB
PSDB Cidadania Federation; Federação PSDB Cidadania	Aécio Neves	11 / 513	2 / 81	74 / 1,060	Cidadania
Solidary Renewal Federation; Federação Renovação Solidária	Ovasco Resende	7 / 513	0 / 81	54 / 1,060	Solidariedade
Solidary Renewal Federation; Federação Renovação Solidária	Ovasco Resende	7 / 513	0 / 81	54 / 1,060	PRD

== Extinct parties ==
This list presents the parties of the current Sixth Republic that were once registered with the Superior Electoral Court, but have ceased to exist. The existence of all these parties has ended by the result of mergers.

- Democrats - DEM (Democratas) (Note: Known from 1985 to 2007 as the Party of the Liberal Front (Partido da Frente Liberal).)
- Party of the Nation's Retirees - PAN (Partido dos Aposentados da Nação)
- Christian Democratic Party (1985) - PDC (Partido Democrata Cristão)
- Democratic Social Party - PDS (Partido Democrático Social)
- Workers' General Party - PGT (Partido Geral dos Trabalhadores)
- Humanist Party of Solidarity - PHS (Partido Humanista da Solidariedade) (Note: Known from 1995 to 1998 as the National Solidarist Party (Partido Solidarista Nacional), and from 1998 to 2000 as the Party of National Solidarity (Partido da Solidariedade Nacional).)
- Liberal Party (1985) - PL (Partido Liberal)
- Free Fatherland Party - PPL (Partido Pátria Livre)
- Progressive Party (1993) - PP (Partido Progressista)
- Reform Progressive Party - PPR (Partido Progressista Reformador)
- Party of Reconstruction of the National Order - PRONA (Partido de Reedificação da Ordem Nacional)
- Republican Party of the Social Order - PROS (Partido Republicano da Ordem Social)
- Progressive Republican Party - PRP (Partido Republicano Progressista)
- Social Christian Party - PSC (Partido Social Cristão)
- Social Democratic Party (1987) - PSD (Partido Social Democrático)
- Social Liberal Party - PSL (Partido Social Liberal)
- Social Labour Party (1983) - PST (Partido Social Trabalhista)
- Brazilian Labour Party (1981) - PTB (Partido Trabalhista Brasileiro)
- Renewal Labour Party - PTR (Partido Trabalhista Renovador)
- Patriot (Patriota) (Note: Known from 2011 to 2017 as the National Ecological Party (Partido Ecológico Nacional).)

== Historical parties ==
This list presents the parties that never reached the Sixth Republic. Due to the large number of parties that were dissolved, especially during the First and Second Republics, it is not intended to be an exhaustive list.

=== Imperial Brazil (1822–1889) ===
- Conservative Party (Partido Conservador)
- Liberal Party (Partido Liberal)
- Progressive League (Liga Progressista) (Note: Also called Progressive Party.)

=== First and Second Republics (1889–1937) ===
- Paulista Republican Party - PRP (Partido Republicano Paulista)
- Rio-grandense Republican Party - PRR (Partido Republicano Rio-Grandense)
- Minas Gerais Republican Party - PRM (Partido Republicano Mineiro)
- Fluminense Republican Party - PRF (Partido Republicano Fluminense)
- Federal Republican Party - PRF (Partido Republicano Federal)
- Conservative Republican Party - PRC (Partido Republicano Conservador)
- Democratic Party - PD (Partido Democrático)
- Liberating Party - PL (Partido Libertador)
- Brazilian Black Front - FNB (Frente Negra Brasileira)
- Catholic Electoral League (Liga Eleitoral Católica)
- Brazilian Integralist Action - AIB (Ação Integralista Brasileira)

=== Fourth Republic (1945–1964) ===
- National Democratic Union - UDN (União Democrática Nacional)
- Brazilian Labour Party (1945) - PTB (Partido Trabalhista Brasileiro)
- Brazilian Socialist Party (1945) - PSB (Partido Socialista Brasileiro) (Note: Known from 1945 to 1947 as the Democratic Left (Esquerda Democrática).)
- Orienting Labour Party - POT (Partido Orientador Trabalhista)
- Christian Democratic Party (1945) - PDC (Partido Democrata Cristão)
- Social Democratic Party (1945) - PSD (Partido Social Democrático)
- Republican Party - PR (Partido Republicano)
- Popular Representation Party - PRP (Partido de Representação Popular)
- National Labour Party - PTN (Partido Trabalhista Nacional)
- Social Labour Party (1946) - PST (Partido Social Trabalhista) (Note: Known from 1946 to 1947 as the Proletarian Party of Brazil (Partido Proletário do Brasil).)
- Social Progressive Party - PSP (Partido Social Progressista) (Note: Created from the merger of three parties: the National Agrarian Party (Partido Agrário Nacional), the Popular Syndicalist Party (Partido Popular Sindicalista) and the Progressive Republican Party (Partido Republicano Progressista).)
- Republican Labour Party - PRT (Partido Republicano Trabalhista) (Note: Known from 1958 until its dissolution in 1965 as the Rural Labour Party (Partido Rural Trabalhista).)
- Renewal Labour Movement - MTR (Movimento Trabalhista Renovador)

=== Military Dictatorship (1964–1985) ===
- National Renewal Alliance - ARENA (Aliança Renovadora Nacional)
- Brazilian Democratic Movement - MDB (Movimento Democrático Brasileiro)

== See also ==
- Politics of Brazil
- List of political parties by country
