= Celso Pitta =

Brazilian politician (1946–2009)

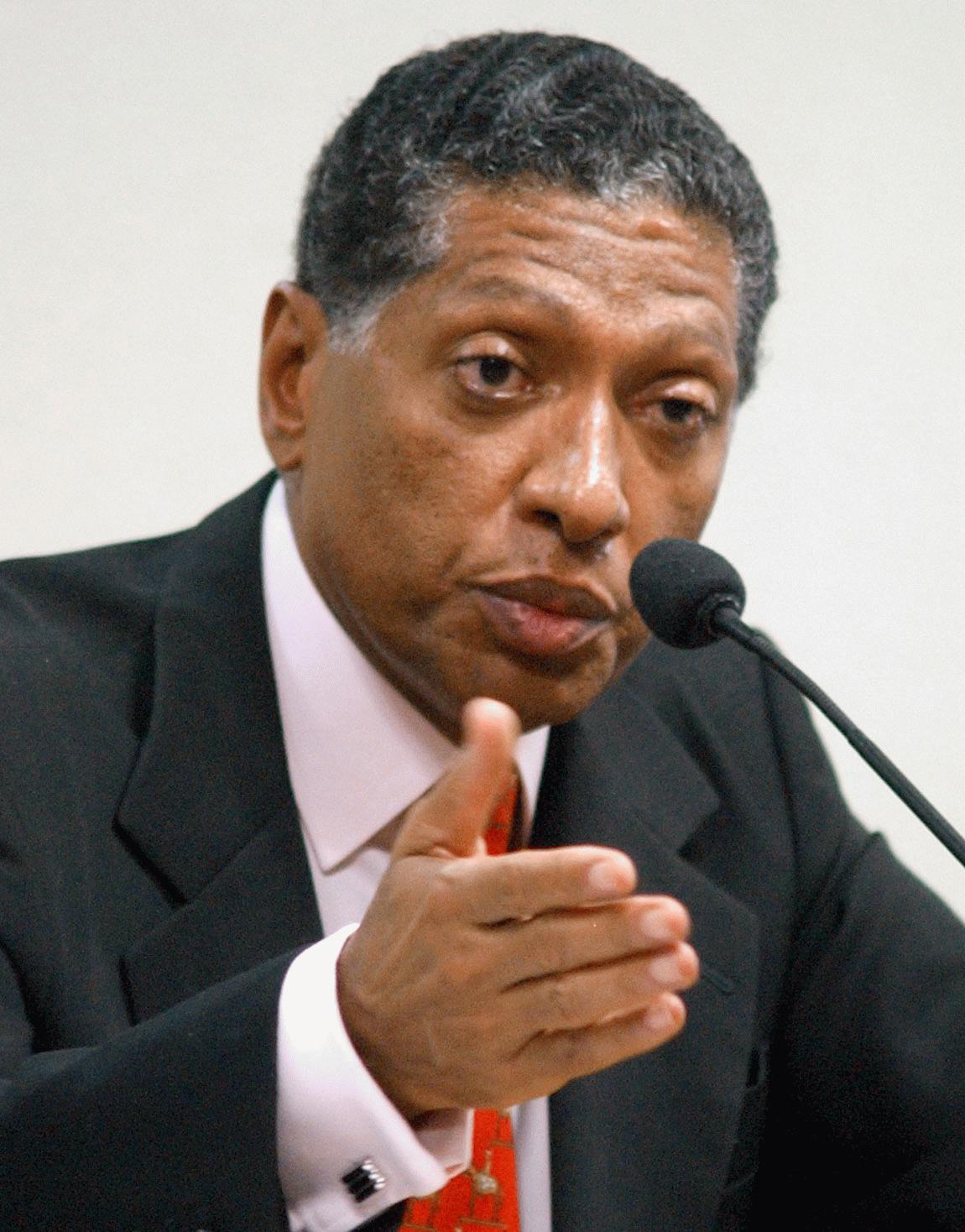

Mayor of São Paulo
- In office January 1, 1997 – January 1, 2001; Suspended: May 26, 2000 – June 13, 2000
- Vice Mayor: Régis de Oliveira
- Preceded by: Paulo Maluf
- Succeeded by: Marta Suplicy

Personal details
- Born: September 29, 1946 Rio de Janeiro, Brazil
- Died: November 20, 2009 (aged 63) São Paulo, Brazil
- Party: PPB, PTB
- Spouse: Nicéa Camargo (divorced)
- Occupation: Economist

Celso Roberto Pitta do Nascimento (Brazilian Portuguese: [ˈsɛwsu ˈpitɐ]; 29 September 1946 – 21 November 2009) was a Brazilian economist and politician. He had a Bachelor in Economics by Fluminense Federal University, master in Economics by University of Leeds and specialist in Advanced Administration by Harvard University.

== Mayor ==
Pitta was the second Afro-Brazilian mayor of São Paulo, after Paulo Lauro. Elected as mayor from 1997 to 2000, he succeeded Paulo Maluf, under whom he was Municipal Secretary of Finance. Pitta was a member of the PPB party at that time, and faced corruption allegations like his predecessor, most notoriously with accusations coming from his ex-wife, Nicéa Camargo. On May 26, 2000, he was ousted from office by a decision of the São Paulo State Supreme Court, and Vice Mayor Régis de Oliveira succeeded to the mayoralty. Eighteen days later the court's decision was reversed, and Pitta returned to office with Régis de Oliveira as vice mayor. In 2002 and 2006, Pitta ran for a seat in the Federal Chamber of Deputies, but was defeated both times.

The biggest corruption scandal which involved Pitta's administration was called, the “Escândalo dos Precatórios” and concerned the issue of municipal-guaranteed bonds (precatórios in Portuguese) to pay off debts resulting from judgments of claims against the city. At that time, the issue of municipal bonds for any other purpose had already been forbidden. To get around the budget limits, false precatórios were created so that bonds could be issued to get money to pay a variety of expenses.

== Later life ==
Illegal financial operations made by Pitta were intercepted by the Federal Police during an Operation called Satiagraha, on 8 July 2008, leading to others' and the former mayor's arrest. The Satiagraha's Operation caught the former mayor illegal negotiations, between them, another precatóro’s negotiation with the liquid value of 92 million reais, more than US$170 million, at that time.

Celso Pitta was indicted for money laundering and fraud, having already been convicted on two charges related to the precatórios, before his arrest during the Satiagraha Operation.

In November 2009, he died from colorectal cancer at the Hospital Sírio-Libanês in São Paulo.

== See also ==
- Politics of Brazil
- Mensalão

Preceded by Paulo Maluf	Mayor of São Paulo; 1997–2000	Succeeded by Régis de Oliveira
Preceded by Régis de Oliveira	Mayor of São Paulo; 2000	Succeeded by Marta Suplicy
