= Trade unions in Brazil =

Labour movement in Brazil

- National organization(s): COB, CAT, CUT, CBTC, CGT, CONTAG, FS
- Density: 13% (2019)
- CBA coverage: 64.8% (2020)

Global Rights Index
- 5 No guarantee of rights

International Labour Organization
- Brazil is a member of the ILO

Convention ratification
- Freedom of Association: Not ratified
- Right to Organise: 18 November 1952

Trade unions in Brazil first emerged in the late 19th century with the expansion of manufacturing and the influx of immigrant workers, especially from Spain, Italy and Germany, who were influenced by socialist and anarchist movements in their home countries.

== History ==
Trade unions in Brazil originated during the period of industrialisation at the end of the 19th century. As in other countries, Brazilian workers faced unfavorable working conditions, low wages and a lack of social protection.

The first organized movements emerged in the context of strikes and revolts by factory workers, mainly in industrialised urban areas such as São Paulo and Rio de Janeiro. One of the first major strikes occurred in 1917, in the city of São Paulo, known as the general strike of 1917.

During the following decades, trade unions grew stronger with the formation of unions and worker associations in different sectors of the economy. The growth of industry and the urbanization of the country contributed to the increase in the organization and mobilization of workers.

In the 1930s, the government of Getúlio Vargas implemented policies that recognized unions and granted some rights to workers, such as regulating working hours and creating the Labor Court. This period also saw the rise of the state-linked trade union movement.

During the military dictatorship (1964-1985), unions were repressed and many union leaders were persecuted, arrested or exiled due to the anti-communism of the government at the time. However, the period also witnessed worker resistance, with strikes and demonstrations.

In the 1980s, with the redemocratization, the trade union movement re-emerged with strength, leading popular mobilizations for democratic and social rights. During this period, the Unified Workers' Central was created, later becoming one of the main trade union organizations in the country.

Since then, the labour movement in Brazil has continued to play an important role in the fight for better working conditions, decent wages and social rights.

=== Labourism ===
Based on the demands of the labour movement, the so-called "labourism" (in Portuguese: trabalhismo) developed in Brazil as a set of doctrines on the economic situation of workers. Labourism emerged with the aim of defending workers' rights and promoting economic development with social justice. Among its characteristics are economic nationalism, social protection, corporatism, populism and developmentalism.

Labourism had, as theorists, Alberto Pasqualini and San Tiago Dantas. Pasqualini rejected revolutionary socialism and defended the market economy, but, inspired by Catholic solidarism, although agnostic in his public life, he considered that all profit must correspond to social gain, even using the term "solidarist capitalism" as a synonym of labourism. Considering freedom and solidarity to be the two fundamental values of a society, he saw the possibility of social transformations through a change in mentality, which would be possible through public education policies.

The roots of the Brazilian labour movement go back to factory trade unions, at the beginning of the 20th century, "tenentismo" of the 1920s, a movement formed by low-ranking military officers who demanded secret ballots, women's suffrage and educational reform, and Castilhism, the political doctrine of Júlio de Castilhos, which promoted state centralization, administrative modernization, and positivist-inspired reforms that influenced early labor organization and political activism in Rio Grande do Sul. Figures like Getúlio Vargas, João Goulart and Leonel Brizola all came from this southern political and social milieu.

In 1929, the lieutenants joined the Liberal Alliance, which also had the support of Alberto Pasqualini, opposing the milk coffee politics, which guaranteed oligarchs from Minas Gerais and São Paulo would alternated as president of the republic. Formally, labourism began with the founding of the Brazilian Labour Party inspired by Vargas. However, Pasqualini and his followers, called "Pasqualinistas", constituted a group more critical of Vargas inside the party.

In the 1930s, the Vargas government implemented labour policies that recognized unions and granted some rights to workers, such as the regulation of working hours and the creation of the Labour Court. This period also saw the rise of the state-linked trade union movement.

During the 1950s and 1960s, labourism became the main branch of the moderate left in Brazilian politics, attracting sectors and voters who rejected both right-wing economics and communism. During his campaign for governor of Rio Grande do Sul, Leonel Brizola published a text giving his definition of labourism:

Among other things, it is worth saying that labourim is nationalist, communism is international; communism is materialist, labourism is inspired by Christian social doctrine; communism is the abolition of property, labourism defends property within a social purpose; communism enslaves man to the State and prescribes the work guarantee regime, labourism is the dignification of work and does not tolerate the exploitation of man by the State nor of man by man; communism educates to form a society of ants, labourism educates for progress, for freedom, for the elevation of the human person. Communism exists where reactionary and exploitative capitalism pontificates and disappears in communities and countries that are well organized from a social and human point of view.

— Leonel Brizola, 1958

Still in the 1960s, labourism had already experienced splits. From the end of the 1970s, the Brazilian Labour Party found itself divided politically by groups that disputed the use of the party's name as well as control over it. In 1980, by decision of the Superior Electoral Court, Ivete Vargas won the dispute, obtaining the right to use the name and control over the party, resulting in the confluence of left-leaning labourists founding the Democratic Labour Party, led by Brizola, and other smaller groups organizing themselves into the Labour Party of Brazil (now Avante) and the National Labour Party (now Podemos).
