= Junior Lourenço =

Brazilian politician (born 1978)

Júnior Lourenço
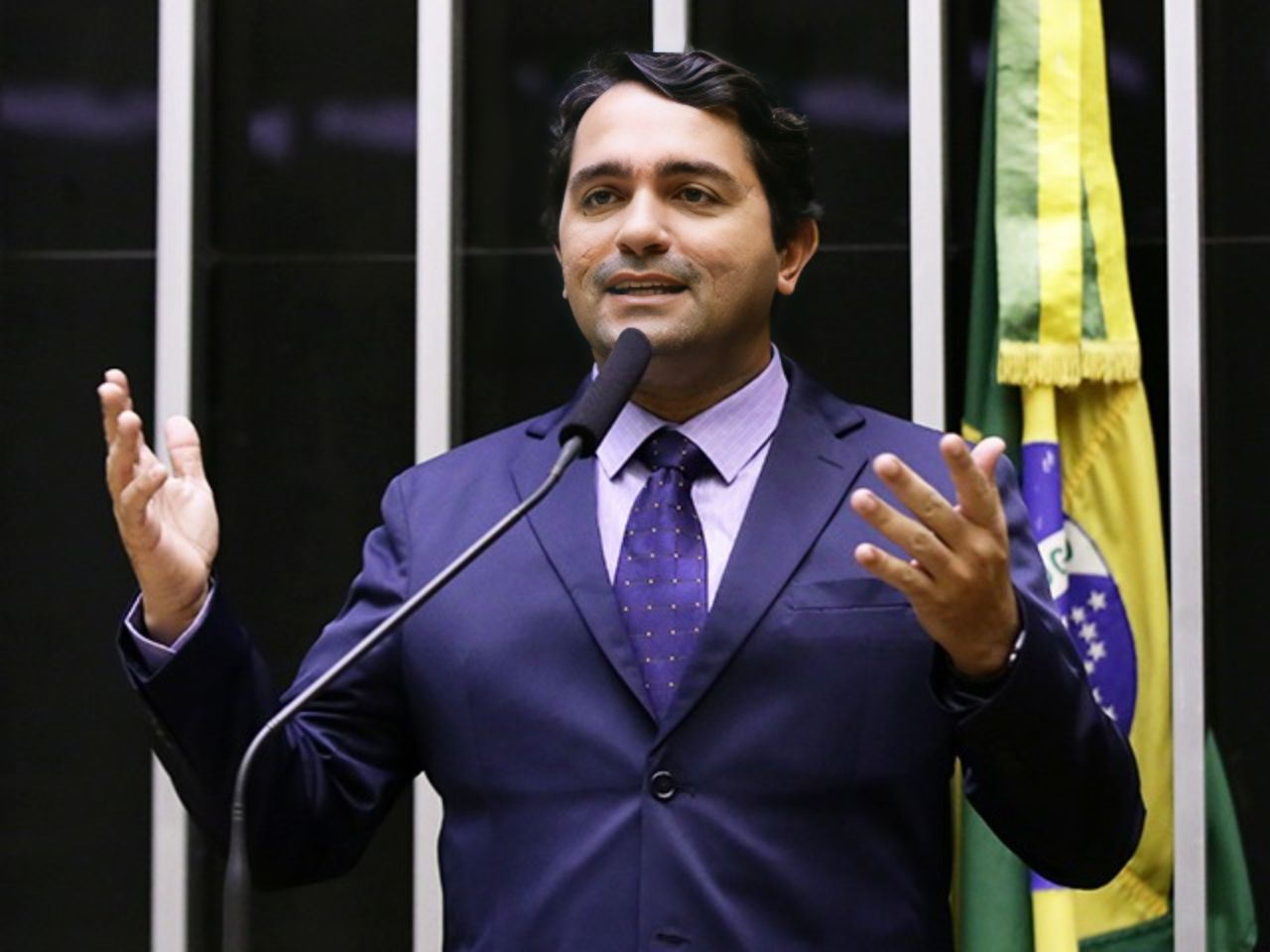
- Lourenço in 2023

Member of the Chamber of Deputies
- Incumbent
- Assumed office 1 February 2019
- Constituency: Maranhão

Personal details
- Born: José Lourenço Bonfim Júnior; 18 October 1978 (age 48) São Luís, Maranhão, Brazil
- Party: MDB (2026–present)
- Other political affiliations: PTB (2003–2018); PL (2018–2026)

José Lourenço Bonfim Júnior, better known as Júnior Lourenço (born 18 October 1978), is a Brazilian politician serving as a member of the Chamber of Deputies since 2019. From 2009 to 2016, he served as mayor of Miranda do Norte.
