= CBTC (disambiguation) =

CBTC mostly refers to Communications-based train control. It can also refer to:

- Confederação Brasileira de Trabalhadores Cristãos, a trade union in Brazil
- CBTC-FM, a rebroadcaster of CBYG-FM
