= 1986 Brazilian legislative election =

- 15 November 1986
- Chamber of Deputies
- 487 seats in the Chamber of Deputies
| Party | Leader | Vote % | Seats | +/– |
Chamber of Deputies
| MDB | José Sarney | 47.84 | 260 | +60 |
| PFL | | 17.70 | 118 | New |
| PDS | Paulo Maluf | 7.89 | 33 | −202 |
| PT | Lula da Silva | 6.88 | 16 | +8 |
| PDT | Leonel Brizola | 6.50 | 24 | +1 |
| PTB | Ricardo Ribeiro | 4.46 | 17 | +4 |
| PL | Álvaro Valle | 2.82 | 6 | New |
| PDC | | 1.19 | 5 | New |
| PSB | | 0.95 | 1 | New |
| PCB | Giocondo Dias | 0.90 | 3 | New |
| PCdoB | | 0.63 | 3 | New |
| PSC | | 0.44 | 1 | New |
This lists parties that won seats. See the complete results below.
- Senate
- 49 seats in the Senate
| Party | Leader | Vote % | Seats |
|---|---|---|---|
| MDB | José Sarney | | 38 |
| PFL | | | 7 |
| PDS | Paulo Maluf | | 2 |
| PDT | Leonel Brizola | | 1 |
| PMB | | | 1 |
This lists parties that won seats. See the complete results below.

Legislative elections were held in Brazil on 15 November 1986. The Brazilian Democratic Movement Party won 260 of the 487 seats in the Chamber of Deputies and 38 of the 49 seats in the Senate. The members of both chambers elected in this election, together with the Senators elected in 1982 came together to form a Constitutional Assembly during 1987 and 1988. The Assembly produced a new constitution, which was promulgated on 5 October 1988.

== Results ==
=== Chamber of Deputies ===
| Party | Votes | % | Seats | +/– |
|---|---|---|---|---|
| Brazilian Democratic Movement Party | 22,633,805 | 47.84 | 260 | +60 |
| Liberal Front Party | 8,374,709 | 17.70 | 118 | New |
| Democratic Social Party | 3,731,735 | 7.89 | 33 | –202 |
| Workers' Party | 3,253,999 | 6.88 | 16 | +8 |
| Democratic Labour Party | 3,075,429 | 6.50 | 24 | +1 |
| Brazilian Labour Party | 2,110,467 | 4.46 | 17 | +4 |
| Liberal Party | 1,335,139 | 2.82 | 6 | New |
| Christian Democratic Party | 565,021 | 1.19 | 5 | New |
| Brazilian Socialist Party | 450,948 | 0.95 | 1 | New |
| Brazilian Communist Party | 427,618 | 0.90 | 3 | New |
| Communist Party of Brazil | 297,237 | 0.63 | 3 | New |
| Social Christian Party | 207,903 | 0.44 | 1 | New |
| Brazilian Municipalist Party | 180,207 | 0.38 | 0 | New |
| Humanist Party | 124,882 | 0.26 | 0 | New |
| Communitarian Municipalist Party | 101,693 | 0.21 | 0 | New |
| Labour Agrarian and Renewing Socialist Party | 68,121 | 0.14 | 0 | New |
| Socialist Party | 59,165 | 0.13 | 0 | New |
| Brazilian People's Party | 57,959 | 0.12 | 0 | New |
| Party of National Mobilization | 44,173 | 0.09 | 0 | New |
| Renewing Labour Party | 37,229 | 0.08 | 0 | New |
| Democratic Nationalist Party | 34,740 | 0.07 | 0 | New |
| Labour Reforming Party | 29,387 | 0.06 | 0 | New |
| New Republic Party | 28,751 | 0.06 | 0 | New |
| National Community Party | 21,768 | 0.05 | 0 | New |
| Youth Party | 19,048 | 0.04 | 0 | New |
| National Tancredista Party | 17,611 | 0.04 | 0 | New |
| Nationalist Party | 12,298 | 0.03 | 0 | New |
| Independent Democratic Party | 7,329 | 0.02 | 0 | New |
| Progressive Renewal Party | 2,787 | 0.01 | 0 | New |
| Total | 47,311,158 | 100.00 | 487 | +8 |
| Valid votes | 47,311,158 | 71.88 | | |
| Invalid/blank votes | 18,512,433 | 28.12 | | |
| Total votes | 65,823,591 | 100.00 | | |
| Registered voters/turnout | 69,309,231 | 94.97 | | |
Source: Nohlen

=== Senate ===
| Party | Seats |
|---|---|
| Brazilian Democratic Movement Party | 38 |
| Liberal Front Party | 7 |
| Democratic Social Party | 2 |
| Democratic Labour Party | 1 |
| Brazilian Municipalist Party | 1 |
| Total | 49 |
Source: Nohlen
