= Régis de Oliveira =

Brazilian lawyer, professor, and politician

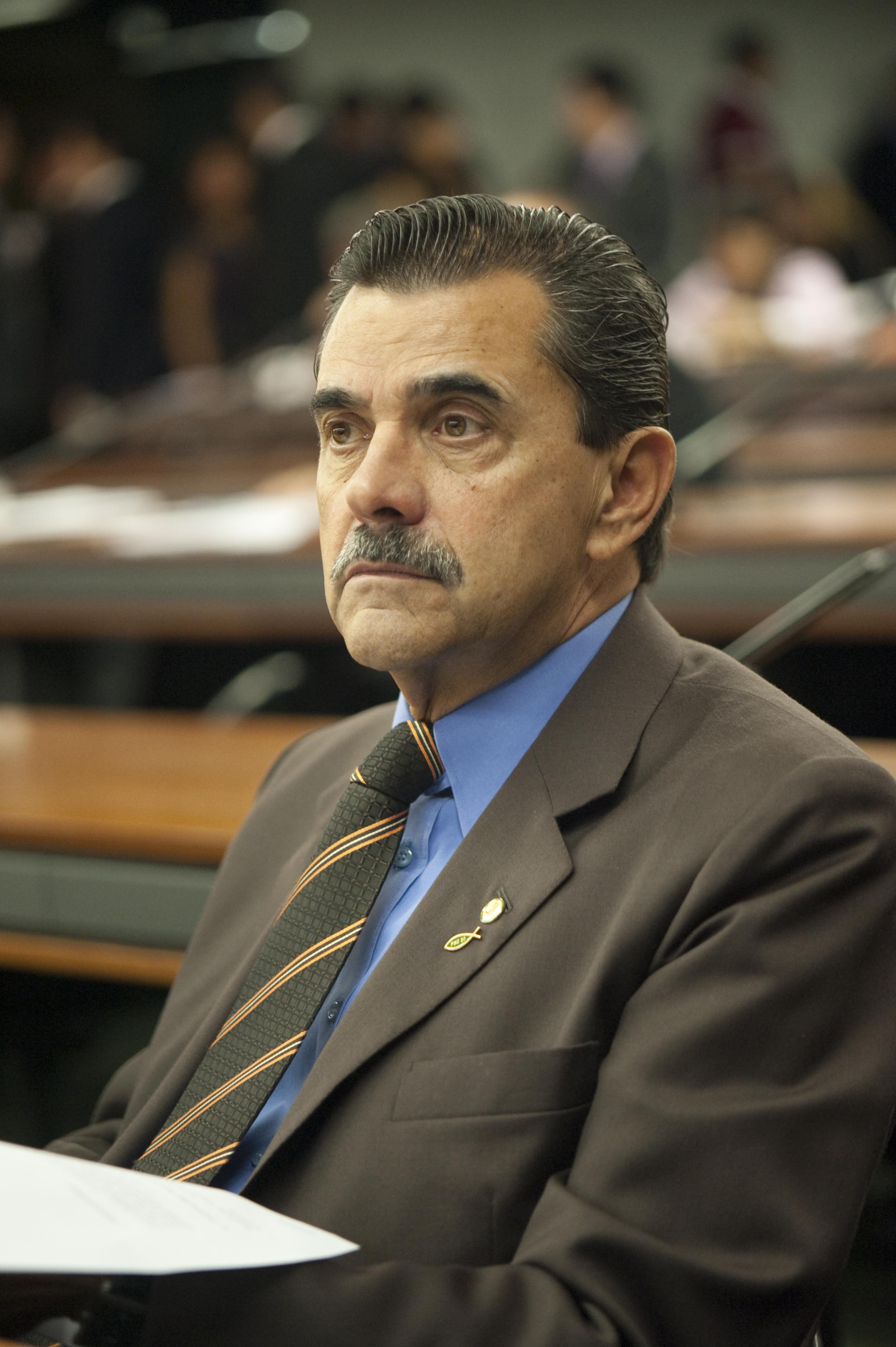

56th Mayor of São Paulo
- In office May 26, 2000 – June 13, 2000
- Preceded by: Celso Pitta
- Succeeded by: Celso Pitta

Vice Mayor of São Paulo
- In office January 1, 1997 – January 1, 2001
- Mayor: Celso Pitta
- Preceded by: Sólon Borges dos Reis
- Succeeded by: Hélio Bicudo

Federal Deputy of Brazil
- In office 1 February 2007 – 1 February 2011
- Constituency: São Paulo

Personal details
- Born: September 19, 1944 (age 81) Monte Aprazível, Brazil
- Party: PSC
- Occupation: Lawyer
- Website: http://www.regisdeoliveira.com.br/

Régis de Oliveira (born September 19, 1944) is a Brazilian lawyer, professor, and politician. He was mayor of São Paulo from May 26 to June 13, 2000.

A magistrate in the São Paulo state court, he was elected a federal deputy for Brazilian Social Democracy Party in 1994. In 1996 he was elected deputy-mayor of São Paulo for the Liberal Front Party, along with mayor Celso Pitta. In 2000, while a member of the National Mobilization Party, he succeeded to the mayoralty when the São Paulo state court sentenced Pitta to the loss of his office, due to corruption charges stemming from an irregular loan given to him by businessman Jorge Yunes. Appealing the court's decision, Pitta was allowed 18 days later to return to office, pending the outcome of the appeal, and Régis de Oliveira resumed his post as deputy-mayor.

He is now a chaired professor of finance law at the Universidade de São Paulo law school. In 2007, he was again elected federal deputy with a term ending in 2011, now for the Social Christian Party.

Preceded by Celso Pitta	Mayor of São Paulo; May 26 - June 13, 2000	Succeeded by Celso Pitta
