= Democratic Social Party =

Democratic Social Party Partido Democrático Social
- President: Paulo Maluf (last)
- Founded: 31 January 1980
- Dissolved: 4 April 1993
- Preceded by: National Renewal Alliance
- Merged into: Reform Progressive Party
- Headquarters: Brasília, DF
- Ideology: Conservatism; Liberal conservatism
- Political position: Right-wing
- Colours: Blue

The Democratic Social Party (Portuguese: Partido Democrático Social, PDS) was a conservative Brazilian political party.

It was established in 1979 as a continuation of the National Renewal Alliance (ARENA), the political wing of the military during the 1965–79 military dictatorship, at a time in which the country was moving away from authoritarianism. However, the official foundation date is 31 January 1980. In 1985, when Paulo Maluf won the party's nomination for the presidential bid, a huge group, led by José Sarney (former leader of ARENA from 1971 to 1980 and of the PDS from 1980 to 1985), Jorge Bornhausen and Marco Maciel, founded the Liberal Front Party (PFL). Sarney was elected vice-president in that year's election, but he served from the beginning as president, due to the death of President-elect Tancredo Neves.

The Democratic Social Party suffered bad defeats in both the 1986 (7.9%) and 1990 (8.9%) elections for the Chamber of Deputies, when at the same time PFL took 17.7% and 12.4%. In 1986, in particular, the party was seriously defeated also in state elections, so that all of the 12 governorships won in 1982 were lost.

In 1993, the party merged with the Christian Democratic Party (3.0% in 1990 elections for the lower house) to form the Reform Progressive Party (PPR), which was intended to be a moderate-conservative party. In 1995 the PPR merged with the Progressive Party, formed a new party called Brazilian Progressive Party, currently known as Progressistas (PP). While the PFL became known as the Democrats (DEM) in 2007 and mrged with the Social Liberal Party (PSL) in 2021 to form Brazil Union (UNIÃO). In 2025, both successors of the PDS–PP and União–formed the Progressive Union Federation.

== Electoral history ==
=== Presidential elections ===
Election was on electoral college not popular vote.

| Election | Party candidate | Electoral votes | % | Result |
|---|---|---|---|---|
| 1985 | Paulo Maluf | 180 | 27.27% | Lost ✗ |

| Election | Party candidate | Votes | % | Result |
|---|---|---|---|---|
| 1989 | Paulo Maluf | 5,986,012 | 8.9% | Lost ✗ |

=== Chamber of Deputies and Senate elections ===
| Election | Chamber of Deputies | | | | | Federal Senate | | | | |
| Election | Votes | % | Seats | +/– | Position | Votes | % | Seats | +/– | Position |
|---|---|---|---|---|---|---|---|---|---|---|
| 1982 | 17,775,738 | 43.2% | 235 / 479 | ▲4 | 1st | 17,799,069 | 42.2% | 15 / 25 | Steady | 1st |
| 1986 | 3,731,735 | 7.9% | 38 / 487 | ▼198 | ▼3rd | | | 2 / 49 | ▼13 | ▼3rd |
| 1990 | 3,609,196 | 8.9% | 42 / 502 | ▲9 | ▼5th | | | 2 / 31 | Steady | ▼5th |

== Notorious members ==
Former members

| Name | Birth date | Death date | Relevant offices by PDS | Relevant offices by other parties |
|---|---|---|---|---|
| João Figueiredo | 15 January 1918 | 24 December 1999 | President of Brazil (1979—1985, by PDS and ARENA). | |
| Aureliano Chaves | 13 January 1929 | 30 April 2003 | Vice President of Brazil (1979—1985, by PDS and ARENA); Minister of Mines and Energy (1985—1988, by DEM and PDS) | Governor of Minas Gerais (1975—1978, by ARENA); Federal Deputy for Minas Gerais (1967—1975, by ARENA) |
| Paulo Maluf | 3 September 1931 | living | Governor of São Paulo (1979—1982, by PDS and ARENA); Federal Deputy for São Paulo (2007—2018, by Progressives, and 1983—1987, by PDS) | Mayor of São Paulo (1993—1997, by PPR and Progressives, and 1969—1971, by ARENA) |
| José Maria Marin | 6 May 1932 | living | Governor of São Paulo (1982—1983, by PDS); Vice Governor of São Paulo (1979—1982, by PDS and ARENA) | State deputy of São Paulo (1971—1979, by ARENA) |
| Antônio Carlos Magalhães | 4 September 1927 | 20 July 2007 | Governor of Bahia (1991—1994, by DEM, 1979—1983, by PDS and ARENA, and 1971—1975, by ARENA); Minister of Communications (1985—1990, by DEM and PDS) | President of the Federal Senate (1997—2001, by DEM); Mayor of Salvador (1967—1970, by ARENA); Senator for Bahia (2003—2007, by DEM, and 1995—2001, by DEM) |
| João Alves Filho | 3 July 1941 | 24 November 2020 | Governor of Sergipe (2003—2007, by DEM, 1991—1995, by DEM, and 1983—1987, by PDS and DEM) | Minister of Internal Affairs (1987—1990, by DEM); Mayor of Aracaju (2013—2017, by DEM, and 1975—1979, by ARENA) |
| Jorge Kalume | 3 December 1920 | 26 October 2010 | Mayor of Rio Branco (1989—1993, by PDS); Senator for Acre (1979—1987, by PDS and ARENA) | Governor of Acre (1966—1971, by ARENA); Federal Deputy for Acre (1963—1966, by PSD) |
| Fernando Collor de Mello | 12 August 1949 | living | Mayor of Maceió (1979—1983, by ARENA and PDS); Federal Deputy for Alagoas (1983—1986, by PDS) | President of Brazil (1990—1992, by Act); Governor of Alagoas (1987—1989, by MDB and Act); Senator for Alagoas (2019—present, by Act, PROS and PL, and 2007—2019, by PTB and Act) |
| Vasco Azevedo Neto | 25 February 1916 | 30 September 2010 | Federal Deputy for Minas Gerais (1970—1986, by PSC, DEM, PDS and ARENA) | |
