= Vasco Azevedo Neto =

Brazilian engineer and politician

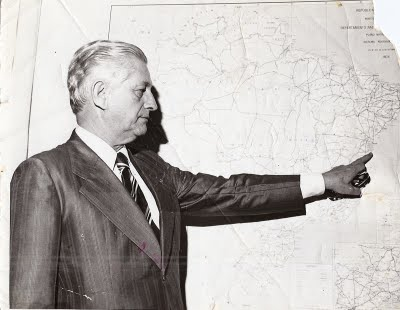

Member of the Chamber of Deputies
- In office 1 February 1971 – 1 February 1979
- Constituency: Bahia
- In office 20 September 1979 – March 1982
- Constituency: Bahia
- In office 5 October 1982 – 1 February 1983
- Constituency: Bahia
- In office 8 January 1986 – 1 February 1987
- Constituency: Bahia
- In office 27 February 1989 – 15 November 1989
- Constituency: Bahia

Personal details
- Born: 25 February 1916 Guaxupé, Minas Gerais, Brazil
- Died: 30 September 2010 (aged 94) Salvador, Bahia, Brazil
- Party: ARENA (1970–1979); PDS (1980–1985); PFL (1985–1986); PSC (1986–1995); PHS (1995–2000)
- Education: University of Bahia (B.Eng.)
- Profession: Politician, civil engineer, professor

Vasco Azevedo Neto (25 February 1916 – 30 September 2010) was a Brazilian engineer and politician. He served as federal deputy for Bahia from 1970 to 1986.

In the 1998 general election, he ran for the Presidency of Brazil by the Humanist Party of Solidarity (PHS), with no success.

== Personal life ==
He was born in Guaxupé, Minas Gerais on 25 February 1916. In 1939, he graduated in the Polytechnic School of the Federal University of Bahia.
