= Edison Carneiro =

Brazilian writer, historian and ethnologist

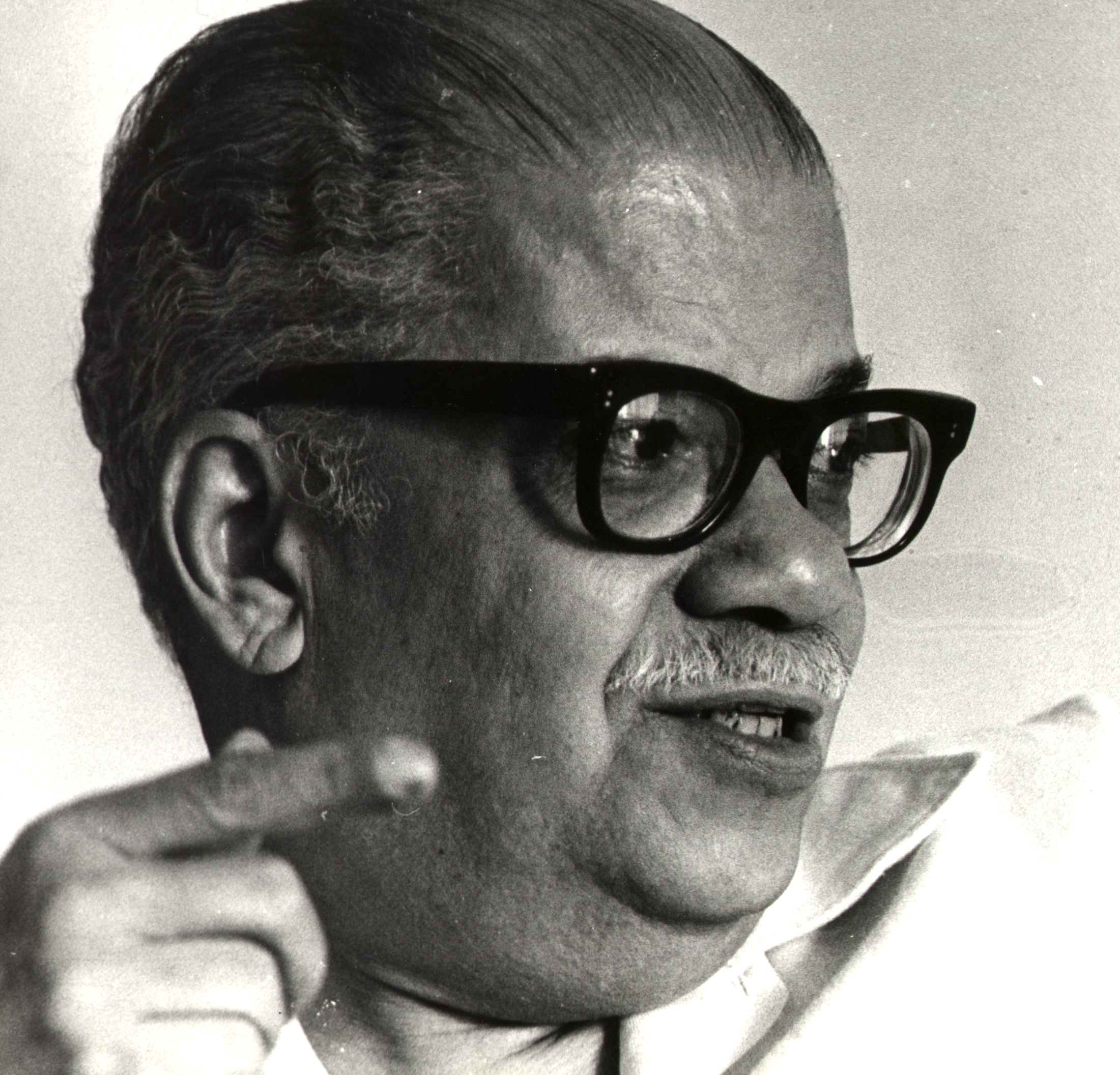
- Born: Edison de Souza Carneiro; 12 August 1912; Salvador, Bahia, Brazil
- Died: 2 December 1972 (aged 60); Rio de Janeiro, Brazil
- Occupations: Writer, ethnologist
- Relatives: Nelson Carneiro (brother); Laura Carneiro (niece)

Edison de Souza Carneiro (12 August 1912 – 2 December 1972) was a Brazilian writer, historian, folclorist and ethnologist who specialized in Afro-Brazilian culture. He was one of the most well-known Brazilian ethnologists during his time with his studies on Afro-Brazilian culture and history, which had largely been ignored by Brazilian academic literature up to that point. He was also an activist with the Brazilian Communist Party (PCB), starting in the 1930s.

== Biography ==
Carneiro was born on 12 August 1912 in Salvador, Bahia, one of 12 children to Antônio Joaquim de Souza Carneiro, the first to find oil in the Lobato neighborhood of Salvador, and Laura Coelho de Souza Carneiro. His brother was senator and president of the national congress Nelson Carneiro, and through him, his niece is federal deputy and Rio de Janeiro councilwoman Laura Carneiro.

He was a part of a wave of historians in the 1930s that gave greater attention academically to Candomblé, with this wave mostly focusing on the Nagô tradition. The growing literature, both scholarly and popular, helped document Candomblé while contributing to its greater standardization. He would later be invited by Dorothy B. Porter, alongside statesmen such as Kwame Nkrumah and Eric Williams, to give lectures at Howard University.

Carneiro, along with Solano and Margarida Trindade, would co-found the Teatro Popular Brasileiro (TPB), a popular theater group inspired by Brazilian Black and indigenous cultural traditions.

In 1962, the "Carta do samba" ("The samba letter"), a document written by Carneiro, was made public, which expressed the need to preserve traditional features of samba, such as the syncopa, without, however, "denying or taking away spontaneity and prospects for progress". This letter came to meet a series of circumstances that made traditional urban samba not only revalued in different Brazilian cultural circles, but also started to be considered by them as a kind of "counter-hegemonic" and "resistance music" in the Brazilian music scene. In a decade characterized in the Brazilian music industry by the domination of international rock music and its Brazilian variant, Jovem Guarda, the traditional samba would have started to be seen as an expression of the greatest authenticity and purity of the genre, which led to the creation of terms such as "samba autêntico" ("authentic samba"), "samba de morro" ("samba of the hill"), "samba de raiz" ("roots samba"), or "samba de verdade" ("real samba").

Carneiro died on 2 December 1972 in Rio de Janeiro.

== Works ==
- Religiões Negras, Editora Civilização Brasileira, Rio de Janeiro, 1936, 1963;
- Negros Bantos, Editora Civilização Brasileira, Rio de Janeiro, 1937;
- O Quilombo dos Palmares, Editora Brasiliense, São Paulo, 1947, 1958;
- Castro Alves, 1947, 1958;
- Candomblés da Bahia, Editora do Museu do Estado da Bahia, Salvador, 1948;
- Antologia do Negro Brasileiro, Editora Globo, Porto Alegre, 1950;
- A Cidade do Salvador, 1954;
- A Conquista da Amazônia, 1956;
- A Sabedoria Popular, 1957;
- Insurreição Praiana, 1960;
- Samba de Umbigada, Ministério da Educação e Cultura, Rio de Janeiro, 1961.

== See also ==
- Afro-Brazilian culture
- Arthur Ramos
- Donald Pierson
- Gilberto Freyre
- Melville J. Herskovits
- Ruth Landes

== Bibliography ==
- Johnson, Paul Christopher (2002). Secrets, Gossip, and Gods: The Transformation of Brazilian Candomblé. Oxford and New York: Oxford University Press. ISBN 9780195150582.
- Hayes, Kelly E. (2007). "Black Magic and the Academy: Macumba and Afro-Brazilian "Orthodoxies"". History of Religions. 46 (4): 283–31. doi:10.1086/518811. JSTOR 10.1086/518811.
- Lopes, Nei (29 May 2020). "O amplo e diversificado universo do samba". In Stroeter, Guga; Mori, Elisa (eds.). Uma árvore da música brasileira (in Brazilian Portuguese). São Paulo: Sesc (published 2019). ISBN 9788594932181.
- Carneiro, Edison (2012). "Carta do samba" (PDF). Centro Nacional de Folclore e Culturar Popular (in Brazilian Portuguese). Rio de Janeiro: Instituto do Patrimônio Histórico e Artístico Nacional.
- Lopes, Nei; Simas, Luiz Antonio (2015). Dicionário da História Social do Samba (in Brazilian Portuguese) (2ª ed.). Rio de Janeiro: Civilização Brasileira.
- Benzecry, Lena (2015). A radiodifusão sonora do samba urbano carioca: uma retrospectiva crítica das principais representações construídas acerca desse gênero musical em programas radiofônicos do Rio de Janeiro (PhD) (in Brazilian Portuguese). Rio de Janeiro: Federal University of Rio de Janeiro. Archived from the original on 26 December 2021.
