= 1982 Brazilian legislative election =

- 15 November 1982
- Chamber of Deputies
- 479 seats in the Chamber of Deputies; 240 seats needed for a majority
Party	Leader	Vote %	Seats	+/–
Chamber of Deputies
PDS	Paulo Maluf	43.22	235	+4
PMDB	Tancredo Neves	42.96	200	+9
PDT	Leonel Brizola	5.82	23	New
PTB	Ivete Vargas	4.45	13	New
PT	Lula da Silva	3.55	8	New
This lists parties that won seats. See the complete results below.
- Senate
- 25 seats in the Senate
Party	Leader	Vote %	Seats
PMDB	Tancredo Neves	43.67	9
PDS	Paulo Maluf	42.22	15
PDT	Leonel Brizola	5.92	1
This lists parties that won seats. See the complete results below.
Chamber of Deputies results by state

Legislative elections were held in Brazil on 15 November 1982. The elections were conducted under the military dictatorship. Massive popular street demonstrations led the military dictatorship to stage the elections.

The pro-government Democratic Social Party (the successor of the ruling National Renewal Alliance) won 235 of the 479 seats in the Chamber of Deputies and 15 of the 25 seats in the Senate. Voter turnout was 82% for the Chamber of Deputies and 83% for the Senate.

== Electoral system ==
Due to the growing popularity of the opposition Brazilian Democratic Movement, the ruling National Renewal Alliance Party passed electoral reforms in 1979, replacing the two-party system in place since 1965 with a multi-party system.

== Results ==
=== Chamber of Deputies ===
Party	Votes	%	Seats	+/–
Democratic Social Party	17,775,738	43.22	235	+4
Brazilian Democratic Movement Party	17,666,773	42.96	200	+9
Democratic Labour Party	2,394,723	5.82	23	New
Brazilian Labour Party	1,829,055	4.45	13	New
Workers' Party	1,458,719	3.55	8	New
Total	41,125,008	100.00	479	+57
Valid votes	41,125,008	84.87		
Invalid/blank votes	7,330,871	15.13		
Total votes	48,455,879	100.00		
Registered voters/turnout	58,871,378	82.31		
Source: Nohlen

=== Senate ===
Party	Votes	%	Seats
Brazilian Democratic Movement Party	18,410,338	43.67	9
Democratic Social Party	17,799,069	42.22	15
Democratic Labour Party	2,496,188	5.92	1
Brazilian Labour Party	1,909,452	4.53	0
Workers' Party	1,538,786	3.65	0
Total	42,153,833	100.00	25
Valid votes	42,153,833	86.48	
Invalid/blank votes	6,592,970	13.52	
Total votes	48,746,803	100.00	
Registered voters/turnout	58,871,378	82.80	
Source: Nohlen
