= Democratic Labour Party (Brazil) =

Brazilian political party

Democratic Labour Party Partido Democrático Trabalhista
- President: Carlos Lupi
- Founder: Leonel Brizola
- Founded: 17 June 1979; 47 years ago
- Split from: Brazilian Democratic Movement
- Preceded by: Brazilian Labour Party
- Headquarters: Rua Sete de Setembro, 141, 4º andar, Centro, Rio de Janeiro
- Think tank: Fundação Leonel Brizola-Alberto Pasqualini
- Youth wing: Juventude Socialista (Socialist Youth)
- Women's wing: Ação da Mulher Trabalhista
- LGBT wing: PDT Diversidade
- Labour wing: Central dos Sindicatos Brasileiros
- Black wing: PDT Negro
- Membership (2023): 1,106,481
- Ideology: Social democracy; Social liberalism; Democratic socialism; Left-wing nationalism; Left-wing populism; Labourism; Getulism
- Political position: Centre-left; Historical: Left-wing
- Regional affiliation: São Paulo Forum
- Continental affiliation: COPPPAL
- International affiliation: Socialist International
- Colours: Red; White; Blue; Green; Yellow
- TSE Identification Number: 12
- Federal Senate: 3 / 81
- Chamber of Deputies: 17 / 513
- Governorships: 1 / 27
- State Assemblies: 52 / 1,060
- Mayors: 314 / 5,568
- City Councillors: 3,441 / 56,810
- Mercosur Parliament: 1 / 55

Party flag

Website
- pdt.org.br

The Democratic Labour Party (Portuguese: Partido Democrático Trabalhista, PDT) is a centre-left political party in Brazil. It defends laborist, democratic socialist, social-democratic and nationalist ideologies.

The Democratic Labour Party (PDT) was founded in 1979 during the redemocratization in Brazil at the end of the Brazilian military dictatorship by Leonel Brizola as a successor of the original Brazilian Labour Party (PTB), continuing the legacy of João Goulart and Getúlio Vargas, while also incorporating and syncretizing elements of European social-democracy he encountered during his exile. However, Brizola was unable to use the name Brazilian Labour Party (PTB), as the military government awarded it to a rival group led by Ivete Vargas, and he established the PDT instead, officially registered in 1980. After Brizola's death in 2004, the party has been led by Carlos Lupi. Ciro Gomes joined the party in 2015, becoming its main national figure and presidential candidate in 2018 and 2022, leaving the party in 2025.

It was the major left-wing party in Brazil until the rise of the Workers' Party (PT) in the late 1980s and early 1990s. Since then, the two parties have maintained a complex and often contentious relationship, alternating between cooperation and rivalry as both sought leadership of the Brazilian left. The PDT has supported PT-led governments at times but has also positioned itself as an independent centre-left alternative. At the 2006, 2018 and 2022 elections the party disputed the presidency, particularly under Ciro Gomes, promoting a nationalist and developmentalist platform distinct from that of the PT. The party also has opposed the Impeachment of Dilma Rousseff, and the governments of Michel Temer and Jair Bolsonaro.

The party joined the Socialist International in 1986, and uses the fist and rose as its symbol. Its TSE Identification Number is 12, and members and sympathizers are called "pedetistas".

== History ==
Logo used between 1979 and 2016

The Democratic Labour Party (PDT) was founded in 1979 by left-wing leader Leonel Brizola as an attempt to reorganise the Brazilian left-wing forces during the end of the Brazilian military dictatorship. Many of its members, including Brizola, had been active in the historical Brazilian Labour Party prior to the 1964 coup, which drove into exile or assassinated a number of its prominent members including ousted President João Goulart. Returning from exile in Uruguay, Brizola originally wanted to reclaim the PTB name for his party, but the military government awarded it to a more moderate grouping led by Ivete Vargas, Getúlio Vargas's great-niece, leading to PDT being formed by a large majority of historical PTB members a week later. The PDT joined the Socialist International as a consultative member in 1986 and a full member in 1989.

The minimalist logo used by the PDT in the 1980s; the fist and rose symbol associated with the party began being used in 1990

The Socialist Youth, founded in 1981, was originally called Labour Youth. Its name had been changed twice: in 1984, to Socialist Labour Youth, and then to Socialist Youth in 1985. The intention was to support the group that defended the participation of the party in the Socialist International as well as the change of the party's name to Socialist Party. The latter never happened, partly due to the founding of the Brazilian Socialist Party.

PDT enjoyed wide, but regionalized electoral success in the 1980s and 1990s, with Brizola winning the governorship of the Rio de Janeiro state, becoming the first and only Brazilian to have governed two different states, previously his native Rio Grande do Sul before the coup and while leading a civil resistance campaign which had successfully delayed an earlier coup attempt in 1962. Meanwhile, it also elected Alceu Collares for the latter's governorship, the first Black Brazilian governor in history.

The best result of the party in a presidential election was reached by historical leader Brizola, with 17% of the votes in the first round of the 1989 presidential elections. However, Brizola lost to rival Luiz Inácio Lula da Silva by a margin of 0.5%, stopping him from facing the right-wing candidate, Fernando Collor de Mello, in the runoff. Brizola lost two more additional bids in 1994, and 1998, as Lula's running mate. In 2002 it launched Ciro Gomes, but later supported Lula in the runoffs as he won in his fourth presidential attempt.

In the 2002 legislative elections, the party won 21 out of the 513 seats of the Chamber of Deputies and five out of the 81 seats of the Senate. Its candidate also won the gubernatorial election in Amapá. Differences with PT, which had accumulated over the 90s as they disputed for similar voter bases, led to an early breakway from the Lula administration, and PDT entered the opposition.

In the local elections of October 2004, the party elected 300 mayors, 3252 city councilors, earning 5.5 million votes. Brizola's death in June that year resulted in a decade of stagnation.

After the political crisis involving the government of Lula, the PDT has received the affiliation of several left-wing leaders from the president's party, the Workers' Party (PT), that disagree with the government policies, including the former Minister of Education, Cristovam Buarque. Cristovam faced president Lula in the first round of the 2006 National Elections, reaching 4th place (with 2.538.834 or 2.64% of the votes). At the legislative elections of October 1, 2006, the party experienced slight gains, winning 24 seats in the Chamber of Deputies. The PDT held onto the governorship of Amapá, and won a surprising victory in the gubernatorial election in Maranhão, which however was overturned due to electoral irregularities in 2009. At the 2010 elections, the PDT made gains in Parliament, winning 28 representatives, and it will have 4 Senate seats. It did not win any governorships, however, and only made it to one gubernatorial runoff, in Alagoas.

Logo used between 2016 and 2021

The PDT was the first party of president Dilma Rousseff (now in PT). Although the PDT voted against the impeachment of Rousseff, six deputies voted in favor, resulting in the suspension of five deputies and the expulsion of the sixth, Giovani Cherini.

In 2018, the party announced Ciro Gomes, former Minister of Finance (1994-1995) and governor from the state of Ceará (1991-1994), to run for the presidency, receiving 12.47% of the votes in the first round, the second highest by a PDT candidate, second only to Leonel Brizola's bid, in 1989. Despite being against the winner of the first round, and the eventual president elected, Jair Bolsonaro, he did not formally endorse Fernando Haddad. It launched Gomes for president again in 2022.

== Ideology ==
The PDT combines a pro-labour, democratic socialistic and social-democratic orientation with nationalism. Apart from a small truce in 1998, the PT and PDT had a rivalry for more than 20 years for the leadership of Brazilian left. The PDT eventually lost the battle and became an ally of the PT on the national level. The alliance, however, was always uneasy; the party always had a strong dissident wing led by the former Federal District governor, former petista and senator for the Federal District Cristovam Buarque. This internal movement was always ousted and disenfranchised by the national chairman of the party, Carlos Lupi, who was always loyal to the PT government. However, many dissidents left the PDT for other parties, such as the Brazilian Socialist Party, Popular Socialist Party, Brazilian Social Democracy Party or Socialism and Liberty Party.

With the arrival of Ciro Gomes and the crisis within the PT, PDT sought to regain the leadership of the left in the post-2014 elections. The move was partially successful: the PDT made significant gains in the municipal elections of 2016 and won more mayoral races than any party of the left apart from the PSB, while PT's own seats fell by 60%. Ciro Gomes, despite having a comparatively much smaller campaign and multiple deals on PT's part to sway other parties, mainly PSB, away from PDT, managed to finish in third place. In the runoff, Fernando Haddad, supported by former President Lula, then in jail, expected support from Ciro but this was ignored, and PDT instead assumed a position of neutrality. From 2019 onwards, PDT kept struggling with PT for leadership of the left.

== Logo ==
Logo used between 2021 and 2026

The current logo is the fist and rose, based on the version created by José María Cruz Novillo for the Spanish Socialist Workers Party in 1977. In the logo introduced in 2021, the leafs and stem bear the main colours of the flag of Brazil (yellow, blue and green): party president Carlos Lupi stated that this was in response to the political use of the national flag by President Jair Bolsonaro.

== Organisation ==
The party is organised in state and municipal directories and also in cooperational social movements, such as the Black Movement, the Labour Woman Association, the Labour Syndicate Union, the Socialist Youth and the Green Labour Movement. Its national directory is composed of over 250 members, while its national executive is composed of 21 members. The cooperational social movements have their own statutes and nationwide organisation.

== Election results ==
=== Presidential elections ===
Election	Candidate	Running mate	Coalition	First round		Second round		Result
Election	Candidate	Running mate	Coalition	Votes	%	Votes	%	Result
1989	Leonel Brizola (PDT)	Fernando Lyra (PDT)	None	11,168,228	16.51% (#3)	-	-	Lost ✗
1994	Leonel Brizola (PDT)	Darcy Ribeiro (PDT)	PDT; PMN	2,015,836	3.19% (#5)	-	-	Lost ✗
1998	Luiz Inácio Lula da Silva (PT)	Leonel Brizola (PDT)	PT; PDT; PSB; PCdoB; PCB	21,475,211	31.71% (#2)	-	-	Lost ✗
2002	Ciro Gomes (PPS)	Paulinho da Força (PTB)	PPS; PTB; PDT	10,170,882	11.97% (#4)	-	-	Lost ✗
2006	Cristovam Buarque (PDT)	Jefferson Péres (PDT)	None	2,538,844	2,64% (#4)	-	-	Lost ✗
2010	Dilma Rousseff (PT)	Michel Temer (PMDB)	PT; PMDB; PR; PSB; PDT; PCdoB; PSC; PRB; PTC; PTN	47,651,434	46.9% (#1)	55,752,529	56.1% (#1)	Elected ✓
2014	Dilma Rousseff (PT)	Michel Temer (PMDB)	PT; PMDB; PSD; PP; PR; PDT; PRB; PROS; PCdoB	43,267,668	41.6% (#1)	54,501,118	51.6% (#1)	Elected ✓
2018	Ciro Gomes (PDT)	Kátia Abreu (PDT)	PDT; AVANTE	13,334,371	12,47% (#3)	-	-	Lost ✗
2022	Ciro Gomes (PDT)	Ana Paula Matos (PDT)	None	3,599,285	3,04% (#4)	-	-	Lost ✗
Source: Election Resources: Federal Elections in Brazil – Results Lookup

=== Legislative elections ===
Election	Chamber of Deputies				Federal Senate				Role in government
Election	Votes	%	Seats	+/–	Votes	%	Seats	+/–	Role in government
1982	2,394,723	5.82%	23 / 479	New	2,496,188	5.92%	1 / 25	New	Opposition
1986	3,075,429	6.50%	24 / 487	▲1	N/A	N/A	1 / 49	0	Opposition
1990	4,068,078	10.04%	46 / 502	▲22	N/A	N/A	1 / 31	0	Opposition
1994	3,303,404	7.23%	34 / 513	▼12	7,299,932	7.62%	4 / 54	▲3	Opposition
1998	3,776,541	5.67%	25 / 513	▼9	3,195,863	5.17%	4 / 81	0	Opposition
2002	4,482,538	5.12%	21 / 513	▼4	7,932,624	5.26%	5 / 81	▲1	Coalition
2006	4,854,017	5.21%	24 / 513	▲3	5,023,041	5.95%	5 / 81	0	Coalition
2010	4,854,602	5.03%	28 / 513	▲4	2,431,940	1.43%	4 / 81	▼1	Coalition
2014	3,469,168	3.57%	19 / 513	▼9	3,609,643	4.04%	8 / 81	▲4	Coalition (2014–2016)
2014	3,469,168	3.57%	19 / 513	▼9	3,609,643	4.04%	8 / 81	▲4	Opposition (2016–2018)
2018	4,545,846	4.62%	28 / 513	▲9	7,737,982	4.52%	5 / 81	▼3	Opposition
2022	3,843,174	3.49%	17 / 513	▼11	1,650,222	1.62%	2 / 81	▼3	Coalition (2023–2025)
2022	3,843,174	3.49%	17 / 513	▼11	1,650,222	1.62%	2 / 81	▼3	Independent (2025–present)
2026	1,868,424	1.64%	6 / 513	▼11	5,395,434	2.60%	1 / 81	▼1	Coalition

== Important party leaders ==
- Leonel Brizola (1922–2004), the brother-in-law of President João Goulart, Brizola formed the Democratic Labour Party in 1979 in an attempt to reorganize the left wing of the country after the last military sponsored President João Figueiredo brought an end to the political persecution of the left.
- Ciro Gomes, lawyer and politician, former governor of Ceará.
- Doutel de Andrade, Leader of the PTB Bench in the Chamber of Deputies in the Government of João Goulart (1961-1964), presided over PDT during the 1980s.
- Darcy Ribeiro, an anthropologist, one of the founders of the University of Brasília.
- Abdias do Nascimento, black intellectual and activist, he would become Senator in the 1990s by the PDT.
- Carlos Alberto Caó, a former student leader in the early 1960s and a black activist, "Caó" was the author, in 1989, of Law 7716, the "Anti-Racism Law"
- Alceu Collares, first Black Brazilian governor
- Jackson Lago, former mayor of São Luís and governor of Maranhão.
- Carlos Lupi, current party president and Minister of Social Security
- André Figueiredo, economist and former leader of the opposition
- Aldo Rebelo, former Minister of Defence and President of the Chamber of Deputies of Brazil

== See also ==
- List of political parties in Brazil

Preceded by 11 - PP	Numbers of Brazilian Official Political Parties; 12 - DLP (PDT)	Succeeded by 13 - WP (PT)
