= Confederação Brasileira de Trabalhadores Cristãos =

CBTC
- Confederação Brasileira de Trabalhadores Cristâos
- Headquarters: Brasília, Brazil
- Location: Brazil
- Key people: Walter De Souza Matos Filho, president
- Affiliations: ITUC

The Confederação Brasileira de Trabalhadores Cristâos (CBTC) is a trade union centre in Brazil. It is affiliated with the International Trade Union Confederation.
