= Paulo Maluf =

Brazilian politician (born 1931)

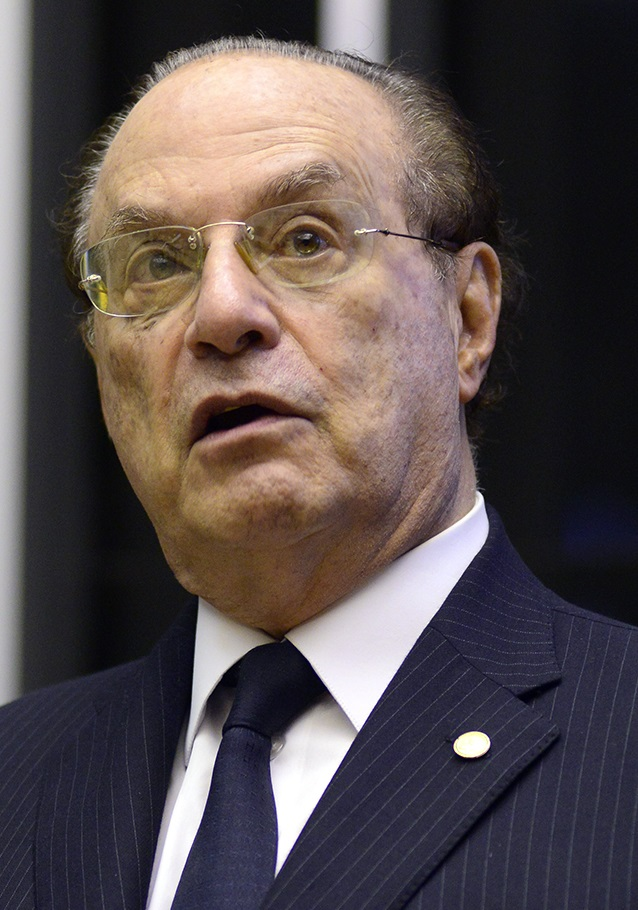
- Maluf in 2015

Federal Deputy
- In office 1 February 2007 – 22 August 2018
- Constituency: São Paulo
- In office 1 February 1983 – 1 February 1987
- Constituency: São Paulo

Mayor of São Paulo
- In office 1 January 1993 – 1 January 1997
- Vice Mayor: Sólon Borges dos Reis
- Preceded by: Luiza Erundina
- Succeeded by: Celso Pitta
- In office 8 April 1969 – 8 April 1971
- Nominated by: Abreu Sodré
- Preceded by: José Vicente Faria Lima
- Succeeded by: Figueiredo Ferraz

Governor of São Paulo
- In office 15 March 1979 – 14 May 1982
- Vice Governor: José Maria Marin
- Preceded by: Paulo Egydio Martins
- Succeeded by: José Maria Marin

President of the São Paulo Comercial Junta
- In office 31 March 1976 – 14 March 1979
- Preceded by: Boaventura Farina
- Succeeded by: Mário Jorge Germanos

President of the Federal Savings Bank
- In office 13 May 1967 – 7 April 1969
- Appointed by: Artur da Costa e Silva
- Preceded by: Lélio Pizza
- Succeeded by: Reinaldo de Barros

Personal details
- Born: 3 September 1931 (age 95) São Paulo, Brazil
- Party: PP (1995–present)
- Other political affiliations: ARENA (1967–1979); PDS (1980–1993); PPR (1993–1995)
- Spouse: Sylvia Lutfalla (m. 1955)
- Children: 4
- Parents: Salim Farah Maluf (father); Marie Estéfano Maluf (mother)
- Education: University of São Paulo (B.E.)
- Occupation: Civil engineer

Paulo Salim Maluf (Portuguese pronunciation: [ˈpawlu saˈlĩ maˈluf(i)]; born 3 September 1931) is a Brazilian politician with a career spanning over four decades and many functions, including those of State Governor of São Paulo, Mayor of the City of São Paulo, Congressman and Presidential candidate. His political base is founded on populism and the provision of major public works; he was a prolific corrupt politician.

His career has been plagued with substantial allegations of corruption, although he was only convicted by Brazilian Courts in 2017. He spent a few months in jail and is now under house arrest due to his poor health and advanced age.

He is the president of the local branch, in the state of São Paulo, of the right-wing Progressive Party of Brazil (PP), heir to the old National Renewal Alliance (ARENA). Interpol has issued a Red Notice to arrest Maluf, extradite him and try him in the United States on charges of conspiracy and criminal possession.

== Early life ==
Paulo Salim Maluf, the son of Lebanese Christian immigrants Salim Farah Maluf and Maria Stephan Maluf, was born in São Paulo, and graduated 1954 in engineering at the University of São Paulo (USP), where coincidentally he was a colleague of the late Mário Covas, another important Brazilian politician who would later become one of his biggest political rivals.

At the time a self-acknowledged playboy with a taste for fast-racing sportscars, Maluf entered professional politics thanks to his family's friendship with the then military president Artur da Costa e Silva, with whom he shared a common interest in Horse racing bets. Banking on this friendship, he was to be appointed mayor of São Paulo in 1969, replacing the very popular Faria Lima. In a manner very similar to New York’s Robert Moses, he suspended the construction of the São Paulo Metro and built one of the most controversial constructions of Brazil: Costa e Silva elevated expressway, also known as Minhocão (“Big Earthworm” in Portuguese). This expressway is seen as responsible for the degradation of a great area of São Paulo's downtown by placing a high-traffic elevated road in the middle of a residential area and is considered as the hallmark of the military dictatorship's – and Maluf's – authoritarian, road enhancement and private-car-friendly urban policies in São Paulo – its building being made possible only by the impossibility of a public reaction to it on the surrounding community's side.

== Unsuccessful presidential contender ==
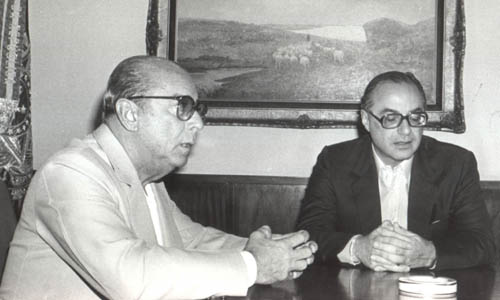
Maluf with President João Figueiredo in the 1980s.

In 1972, following his mayorship, he served as secretary of transport of the state of São Paulo. He would then dispute a convention of the dictatorship's ruling party, ARENA – which was supposed to be a rubber-stamping caucus aimed at choosing as official "candidate" to the state government the former governor Laudo Natel. Maluf, however, succeeded in being appointed official candidate for the following indirect elections by the State Legislative – something he did by means of abundant personal (and generous) promises to the convention's members – being afterwards elected governor for the state of São Paulo in 1978.

During his ensuing term (1979–1983), Maluf used his position for advertising his prospective candidacy to the Presidency in the forthcoming 1985 indirect elections, by means mostly of schemes such as donation of ambulances to impoverished municipalities in Northeastern Brazil, as well as decorating influential people with the State's chief decoration – having them flown to São Paulo free of charge and lodged in luxury hotels before the official decoration ceremony. He also spent wildly in public works, including in some schemes of doubtful validity, such as in an eventually failed plan to move the state's capital city. It was because of such schemes that one of the most notable accusations of corruption against him emerged, concerning the oil company Paulipetro. This was a state company founded by Maluf during his tenure as governor with the purpose of digging the state for oil and which consumed around US$500 million whilst drilling 21 holes and finding nothing but a few pockets of natural gas and water. By then, Maluf had already fostered a reputation "for engaging in corrupt machine politics".

In 1982, he was elected federal deputy with a then national record 672 629 votes and came to stand as the military's preferred presidential candidate for the 1985 presidential elections – the last to be held by means of an Electoral College – where he stood a good chance of winning. His overweening strategy, however, estranged him from most of the party bosses – the civilian caucus which had provided political support to the military dictatorship in the last twenty years. That caused his PDS party (as the current PP was known at the time) to splinter into the PFL, a move that made good the mutual alienation between the ruling military scheme and its civilian base, something which resulted in the election of opposition candidate Tancredo Neves.

== Post-dictatorship career and political resilience ==
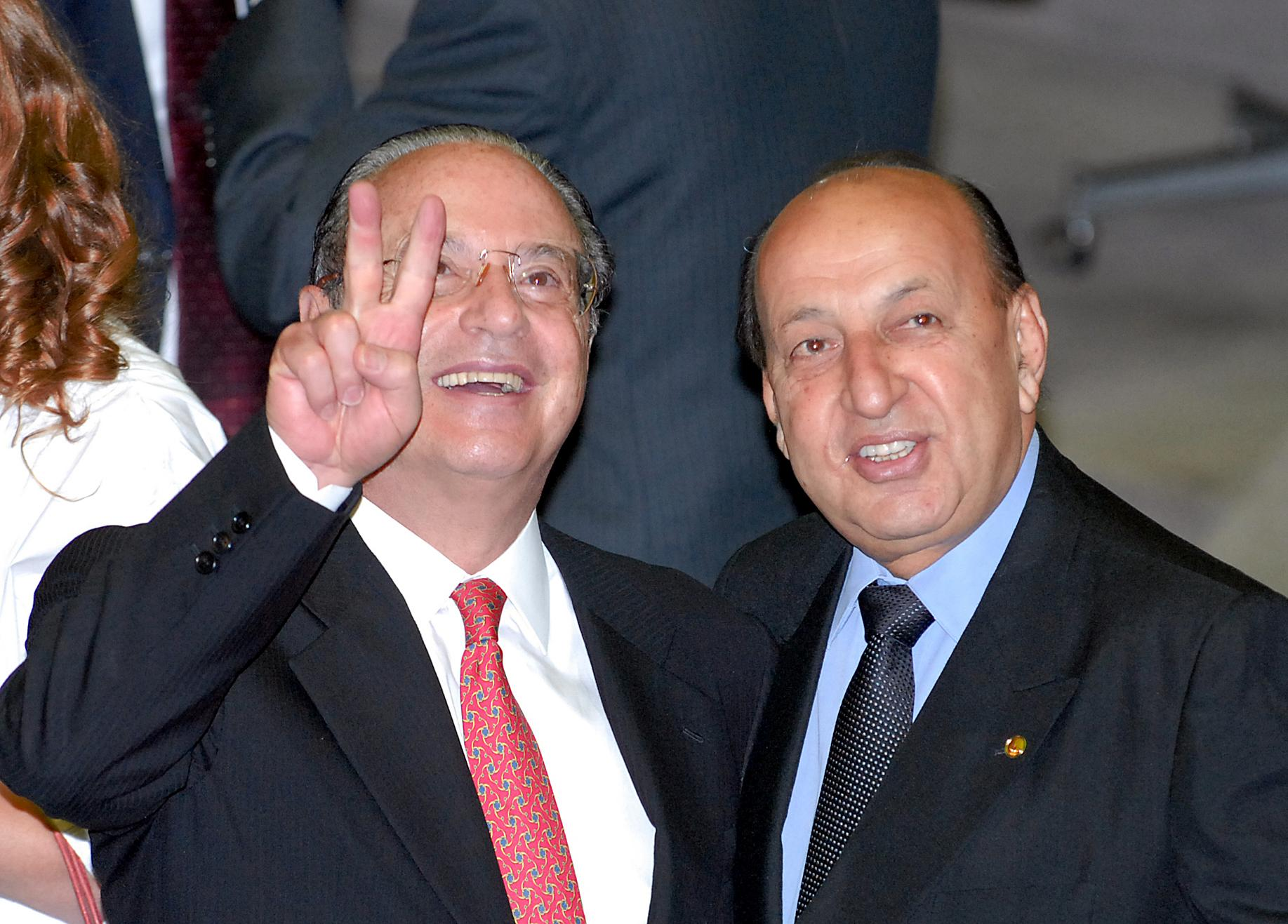
Maluf and fellow Progressive Party Federal Deputy Simão Sessim in 2007.

Since then, Maluf only managed to get himself elected to the Executive once, in 1992, again as mayor of São Paulo, despite his participation in nearly every gubernatorial and mayoral election for São Paulo state and São Paulo city, with the exception of 1989 when he was a presidential candidate in the first direct presidential elections since 1960 – in what was a disastrous campaign, remembered in Brazilian political lore only because of Maluf's "antic", said at a speech made to Medical Faculty students in Belo Horizonte: declaring himself favourable to capital punishment in cases of rape followed by murder, he said jokingly that "if one has sexual urges, that's okay; rape, but do not kill!" (estupra mas não mata). Nevertheless, Maluf remained a regional political force in São Paulo, the election of Celso Pitta as São Paulo city mayor being directly attributed to his endorsement. When he ended his last mayoral term in 1996, he was considered the best mayor São Paulo had ever had up until then, receiving an 80% approval rate. In 2011, a survey by the Datafolha research firm, after asking, again, a sample of São Paulo locals about who would be the best mayor the city had ever had, obtained the result that Maluf stood first with 47% of the sample's preferences.

Such high rates of local approval stand as a reflection of the fact that Maluf was able to forge himself a successful career in post-dictatorship Brazil, despite his perennial reputation for shady deals and for an unsavory personality pointing directly to his former connections to the authoritarian régime. This has led various scholars to try to explain his political resilience. To some, this resilience is of an ideological nature: having his career nurtured in a right-wing military dictatorship, Maluf came to stand for a kind of reactionary activism, especially strong among small businesspeople and the self-employed, whose hallmark consisted "in the refusal to admit the social character of social problems", proposing instead a heavy-handed approach to them. In the words of the extreme-left political analyst Marilena Chaui, writing in the mid-1980s, malufismo stood for the privatization of political power: "a fringe form of the [military] dictatorship as it turned from raw force into mob rule".

== Later life and money laundering indictments ==
However, one of the consequences of Pitta's disastrous administration in São Paulo, was that it left the São Paulo municipality mired in debt, as such drawing attention to Maluf's and his former protégé's management practices: in the words of a Brazilian professor at the end of Pitta's term, "Sao Paulo's corruption has been transformed into a public horror from the whispered-about horror it always was". That called eventually for judicial scrutiny of Maluf's policies, especially his public works, his relentless extension of "the city's [São Paulo's] unmitigating concrete sprawl". One notable example of the allegations of corruption that surfaced around Maluf was the Ayrton Senna tunnel, which passes underneath Ibirapuera Park and cost more, per kilometer, than the Channel Tunnel (it is alleged that the tunnel cost over US$400 million more than it should). Under dispute is Maluf's personal wealth, which critics attribute to his involvement in corruption scandals. Supporters, conversely, point to a legitimate origin of such wealth in his family's companies – such as the large plywood company Eucatex.

Maluf was also part of an extensive investigation, by a Parliamentary Inquiry Committee set up in 2003, regarding money laundering involving bank accounts held by him and his family in Jersey (one of the Channel Islands). He has been convicted of corruption multiple times, but only in 2001 was the sentence final, with no possibility of appeal. At the time, he was forced to pay approximately R$500 thousand to the government. Many of his alleged crimes cannot be prosecuted, due to the nature of the Brazilian statute of limitations. Even if he were to be convicted, there would be serious questions about whether he would serve jail time, as he was already over 70 years of age.

In early September 2005, Paulo Maluf and his son Flávio Maluf were temporarily arrested by the Brazilian Federal Police, under the charge of intimidating witnesses of an ongoing investigation. They were only incarcerated for a few weeks. So notorious is Maluf's reputation that in Brazil the verb malufar was created, meaning "to steal public money". This verb is also sometimes used outside Brazil, with one example being the French newspaper "Le Monde".

In the 2006 elections, Maluf ran for a seat in the Brazilian Chamber of Deputies, being elected as the candidate for the Federal Legislature with the largest number of votes ever (739,837). He was reelected again in 2010, with something around 497,000 ballots cast for him. His 2010 bid for reelection was fraught with legal doubts, as a recent federal statute (Complementary Law 135/2010, commonly known as Lei Ficha Limpa or "Clean Record Act") allowed electoral courts to refuse to register the candidacies of people already found guilty by a higher, collegiate court (possibility of further appeals notwithstanding); however, as the Brazilian STF decided in March 2011 that the "Clean Record Act" did not apply to the 2010 elections, according to the principle of anteriority (no offence being punished when defined by a non-previously existing law, and a Brazilian electoral law must be in force at least a year before the election is held), all charges against Maluf's registration and subsequent office-taking were eventually dropped. During the 2014 elections, Maluf stood again as a congressional candidate, but his candidacy was this time denied acceptance by a 4-to-3 decision of the TSE. Pending a recourse to the STF, Maluf was allowed to campaign and to receive ballots cast for him on October 5, 2014, but such votes are legally regarded as null until - and if - his candidacy is declared as lawful. Were this to happen, his 2014 voting would make him the eighth most voted candidate for the Federal Legislature in the State of São Paulo, with 246,446 ballots.

On March 9, 2007, Robert M. Morgenthau of the Manhattan's District Attorney's office issued an indictment against Paulo Maluf for money laundering in relation to a kickback and inflated invoice scheme that allegedly stole US$11.6 million from a Brazilian road contract project totaling US$140 million. From November 1997 to May 1999 the money passed through an account at the Safra National Bank of New York and was secretly controlled by Maluf. This indictment was maintained by a New York judge on April 25, 2012, who dismissed a petition from the Malufs, Paulo and Flávio, who sought a court order to toss out the indictment.

Also refused by the same judge was the Malufs' bid for having lifted their March 2010 inclusion in the Red notice of Interpol, which makes them subject to arrest and extradition in 181 countries. As this arrest warrant is not valid in Brazil because the Brazilian Constitution does not allow for the extradition of Brazilian citizens, its practical meaning is that the Malufs are to be arrested if they travel outside Brazil.

In addition, Maluf and his son Flávio were sentenced to three years in prison (along with a two-year sentence for his wife Sylvia) in France in 2016.

On 20 December 2017, after being convicted of corruption by the Supreme Court of Brazil and after a few attempts to challenge that conviction by means of internal appeals within the Supreme Court, Maluf surrendered to Brazilian police, to begin his prison sentence as ordered. On 30 March 2018 he was released from prison under house arrest on humanitarian grounds, due to his advanced age and poor health. He currently remains under house arrest and, as ordered by the Brazilian Supreme Court, in August 2018 the Chamber of Deputies of Brazil officially declared that, as a result of his conviction, Maluf lost his Federal Deputy seat.

Government offices
Preceded by Lélio Pizza	President of the Federal Savings Bank; 1967–1969	Succeeded by Reynaldo de Barros
Political offices
Preceded by Faria Lima	Mayor of São Paulo; 1969–1971; 1993–1997	Succeeded by Figueiredo Ferraz
Preceded by Luiza Erundina	Mayor of São Paulo; 1969–1971; 1993–1997	Succeeded by Celso Pitta
Preceded by Paulo Egydio Martins	Governor of São Paulo; 1979–1982	Succeeded by José Maria Marin
