= Humanist Party of Solidarity =

Political party in Brazil

Humanist Party of Solidarity Partido Humanista da Solidariedade
- Abbreviation: PHS
- President: Eduardo Machado
- Founded: 6 July 1995 (as the National Solidarity Party (PSN) in Belo Horizonte (MG))
- Dissolved: September 19, 2019
- Merged into: Podemos
- Headquarters: Brasília, Brazil
- Membership: 210,299
- Ideology: Christian humanism Christian democracy Distributism
- Political position: Centre-right
- Colours: Blue, Yellow, Red
- TSE Identification Number: 31

Website
- www.phs.org.br

The Humanist Party of Solidarity (Portuguese: Partido Humanista da Solidariedade) was a Brazilian political party. Its electoral code was 31 and it became a registered political party on 6 July 1995 with the denomination of "National Solidarity Party" (PSN) and obtained permanent record on 20 March 1997, with its first president being Phillipe Guedon of France. The party advocated distributism and Christian morals.

In the presidential elections of 1998, still with the previous denomination, launched the candidate Vasco Neto. He would receive 109,003 votes, totaling 0.16% of intentions, finishing in 12th place. In 2000 it changed its name to the current one, merging with the group that tried to organize the National Humanist Party. In 2006, the party had officialized its merger with the Popular Socialist Party (PPS) and Party of National Mobilization (PMN) in order to form the Democratic Mobilization, a new association created in order to circumvent the restrictions of the barrier clause, but with its overthrow, the association was broken up and the parties separated.

In 2018, after not getting enough electoral votes to keep receiving funds from the Brazilian Supreme Electoral Court, the party decided to disband itself and merge with Podemos.

== Electoral results ==
=== Presidential elections ===
| Election | Candidate | Running mate | Colligation | First round | | Second round | | Result |
| Election | Candidate | Running mate | Colligation | Votes | % | Votes | % | Result |
|---|---|---|---|---|---|---|---|---|
| 1998 | Vasco Azevedo Neto (PSN) | Alexandre José Ferreira dos Santos (PSN) | None | 109,003 | 0.16% (#12) | - | - | Lost ✗ |
| 2002 | None | None | None | - | - | - | - | - |
| 2006 | None | None | None | - | - | - | - | - |
| 2010 | None | None | None | - | - | - | - | - |
| 2014 | Marina Silva (PSB) | Beto Albuquerque (PSB) | PSB; PPS; PSL; PHS; PPL; PRP | 22,176,619 | 21.3% (#3) | - | - | Lost ✗ |
| 2018 | Henrique Meirelles (MDB) | Germano Rigotto (MDB) | MDB; PHS | 1,288,950 | 1,20% (#7) | - | - | Lost ✗ |
Source: Election Resources: Federal Elections in Brazil – Results Lookup

| Preceded by 30 - NEW (NOVO) | Numbers of Brazilian Official Political Parties; 31 - HPS (PHS)(defunct) | Succeeded by 33 - PNM (PMN) |
