= Ivete Vargas =

Brazilian journalist and politician

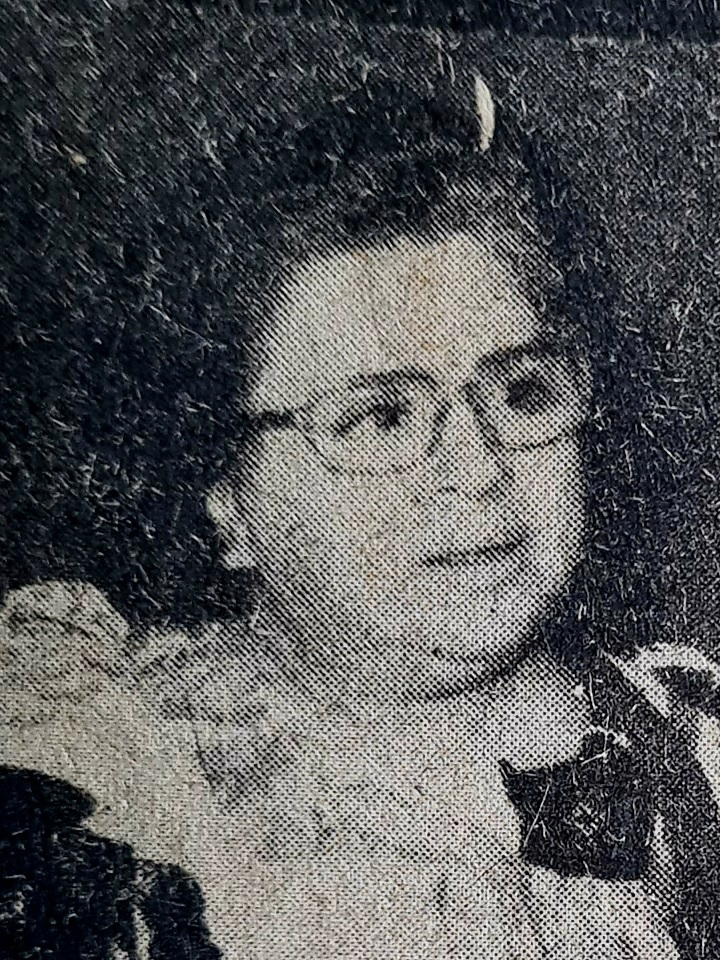
- Vargas around the time of the foundation of the Brazilian Labour Party

Federal Deputy
- In office 1 February 1983 – 3 January 1984
- In office 11 March 1951 – 16 January 1969
- Constituency: São Paulo

National President of the Brazilian Labour Party
- In office 3 November 1981 – 3 January 1984
- Succeeded by: Ricardo Ribeiro

Personal details
- Born: Cândida Ivete Vargas Martins; 17 July 1927 São Borja, Rio Grande do Sul, Brazil
- Died: 3 January 1984 (aged 56) São Paulo, Brazil
- Party: PTB (1950–1965); MDB (1965–1980); PTB (1981–1984)
- Relatives: Getúlio Vargas (granduncle)
- Education: Pontifical Catholic University of Rio de Janeiro
- Profession: Journalist, politician

Cândida Ivete Vargas Martins (17 July 1927 – 3 January 1984), commonly known as Ivete Vargas, was a Brazilian journalist and politician.

== Political career and background ==
Ivete Vargas was the daughter of Newton Barbosa Tatsch and Cândida Vargas, a niece of President Getúlio Vargas, during the second of whose Presidencies her own political career had already begun.

Ivete Vargas served multiple terms representing São Paulo as a Federal Deputy.

=== President of Brazilian Labour Party ===
In 1979, the military dictatorship lifted its enforcement of a two-party state, allowing pluripartidism. Soon thereafter, the social-democratic wing of the original PTB, led by Leonel Brizola, attempted to recreate the Brazilian Labour Party, a party founded by Getúlio Vargas of which Brizola had been a member, but the military government instead awarded the name to a group led by Ivete Vargas. Many of her group were politicians who did not follow PTB's historical labourist ideology, conservatives and even former oppositors of the party, which all but ensured that the new PTB would abandon leftist politics. In response, Brizola instead led his faction to found the Democratic Labour Party (PDT). From 1981 until her death in 1984, Ivete Vargas served as President of the Brazilian Labour Party. The new party embraced centrist or slightly right-leaning politics, but since the conservative wave in the 2010s, it showed strong support for the government of Jair Bolsonaro, in addition to affiliating federal deputy Daniel Silveira, known for making references to AI-5.

== See also ==
- Death of Getúlio Vargas

Party political offices
Party reestablished	National President of the Brazilian Labour Party; 1981–1984	Succeeded by Ricardo Ribeiro
