= Brazilian Labour Party (1981) =

1981–2023 political party in Brazil

Brazilian Labour Party Partido Trabalhista Brasileiro
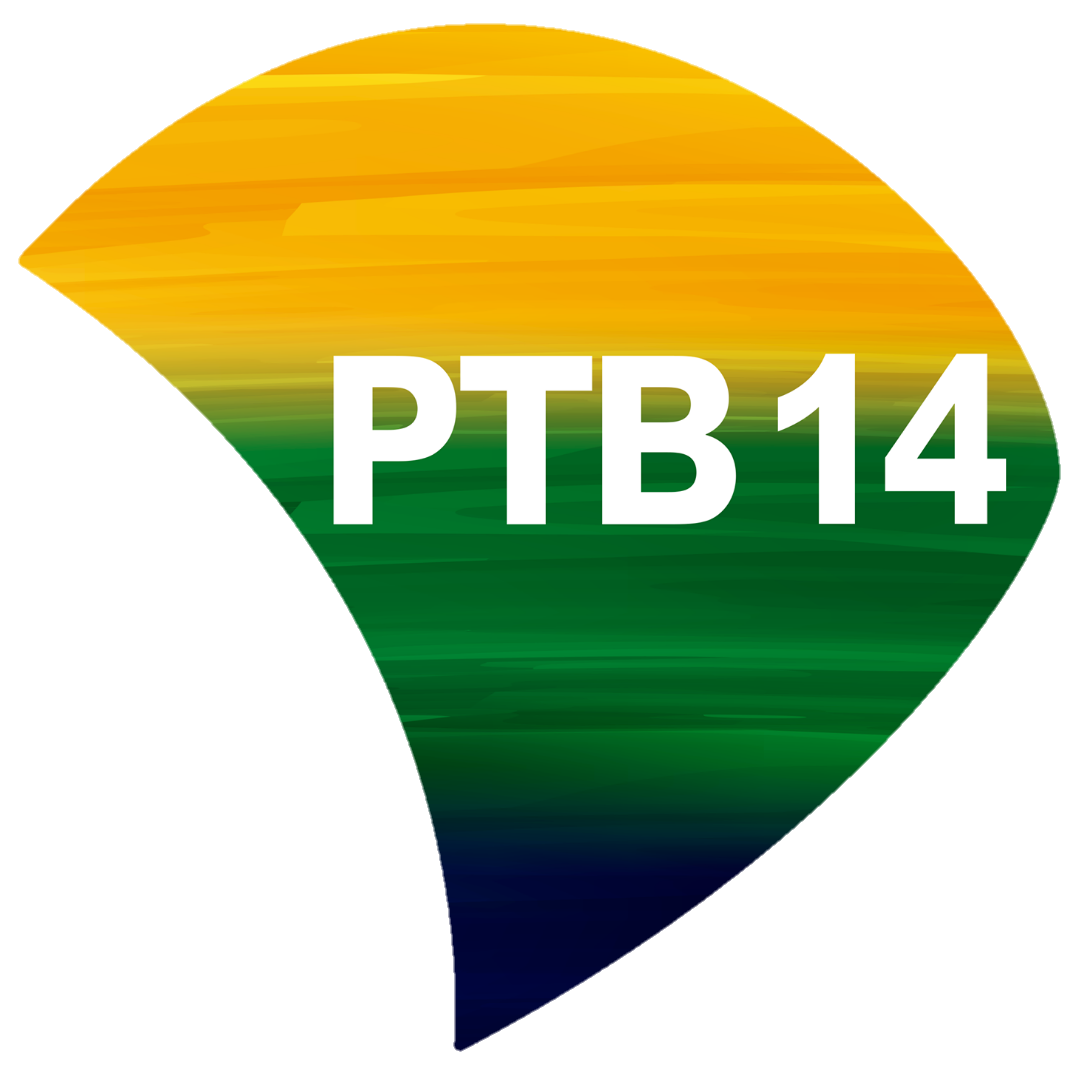
- President: Marcus Vinícius Neskau
- Honorary President: Roberto Jefferson
- Founder: Ivete Vargas
- Founded: 21 November 1979
- Registered: 3 November 1981
- Dissolved: 9 November 2023
- Merger of: Party of the Nation's Retirees; Social Democratic Party
- Preceded by: Brazilian Labour Party
- Merged into: Democratic Renewal Party
- Headquarters: SAS, Qd. 1, Bloco M, Ed. Libertas, Loja 101; Brasília, Brazil
- Think tank: Fundação Ivete Vargas
- Youth wing: Juventude Trabalhista Cristã Conservadora; Historical: Juventude do PTB
- Membership (2021): ▼1,075,750
- Ideology: Right-wing populism; Christian right; Factions: Brazilian Integralism; Historical: Labourism; Left-wing nationalism
- Political position: Far-right; Historical: Centre-left
- Colours: White; Yellow; Green; Blue
- Slogan: "God, Family, Homeland and Freedom"
- TSE Identification Number: 14

Website
- ptb.org.br

The Brazilian Labour Party (Portuguese: Partido Trabalhista Brasileiro, PTB) was a political party in Brazil registered in 1981. It was the seventh largest political party in Brazil with more than a million affiliated as of 2022.

The party was founded by Ivete Vargas, niece of President Getúlio Vargas, and claimed the legacy of the historical PTB founded by Getúlio, although many historians reject this because while early version of PTB was a center-left party with wide support in the working class, and despite the name suggesting a left-leaning unionist labour party, the later PTB was mainly a big tent centrist party for most of its history, considered part of the Centrão, a bloc of parties without consistent ideological orientation which supports different sides of the political spectrum in order to gain political privileges, while Leonel Brizola's Democratic Labour Party (PDT) came to be regarded as the true heir to the original PTB's labourist and leftist traditions. As such, they supported the presidency of Fernando Collor de Mello, Itamar Franco, and Fernando Henrique Cardoso — all considered center-right — as well as Luiz Inácio Lula da Silva and the first term of Dilma Rousseff — who were left-leaning presidents. Since the conservative wave in the 2010s, the party had shown strong support for the government of Jair Bolsonaro, presenting policies from a more right-wing angle, in addition to affiliating federal deputy Daniel Silveira, known for making references to AI-5.

After the 2022 Brazilian general elections, PTB failed to break through the electoral threshold, thus cutting access to party subsidies and free political advertisement. Thus, in November 2023, it merged with the party Patriota to form the Democratic Renewal Party.

== History ==
PTB's logo from 1981 to 2019

The original PTB was a center-left labourist party with strong support from trade unions founded in 1945 by former Brazilian president Getúlio Vargas, who formerly presided the country from 1930 to 1945. After Vargas' suicide in 1954, PTB's main figures became Leonel Brizola and João Goulart, who was elected vice-president in 1960 — becoming president after the resignation of Jânio Quadros — until his deposition after the 1964 coup d'état. After that PTB, along with every other Brazilian party, was banned.

In 1979, the military dictatorship that had dismantled the historical PTB decided to revoke its legislation which enforced a two-party state. Soon thereafter, the social-democratic wing of the original PTB, led by Leonel Brizola, attempted to recreate the party, but the military government instead awarded the name to a group led by Ivete Vargas, niece of Getúlio Vargas, who became the president of the party. Many of her group were politicians who did not follow PTB's historical labourist ideology, conservatives and even former oppositors of the party. Leonel Brizola instead led his faction to found the Democratic Labour Party (PDT). This all but ensured that the PTB would abandon leftist politics, ultimately embracing centrist or slightly right-leaning politics.

At the legislative elections of October 6, 2002, the party won 26 out of 513 seats in the Chamber of Deputies and 3 out of 81 seats in the Senate.

In the 1989, a small dissident faction of moderate social democrats and populists abandoned the PTB and founded the Labour Party of Brazil (PTdoB), which was renamed to Avante in 2017.

Before the 2010 presidential election, PTB participated in the coalition government of former President Luiz Inácio Lula da Silva, and did not field presidential candidates. The party, however, did not support Lula's candidate to succeed him, Dilma Rousseff (herself a former historical PTB/PDT member), as it embarked on PSDB José Serra's failed campaign for president.

Since 2018 with the rise of conservatism and Bolsonarism in Brazil (a phenomenon known as the 'conservative wave'), the party started a strong turn to right-wing politics, declaring itself an openly conservative party, supporting the government of Jair Bolsonaro and his positions. Senator Armando Monteiro left the party in 2021, calling it a "Bolsonarist cult".

In 2020, Jair Bolsonaro left his original party Social Liberal Party (PSL) and failed to form his own Alliance for Brazil, PTB was one of the parties that had extensive negotiations for affiliating him, which helped as Bolsonaro was previously a PTB member from 2003 to 2005, but the negotiations ended up failing.

For the 2022 Brazilian general election, PTB initially chose Roberto Jefferson as their presidential candidate, but on 1 September 2022, the Superior Electoral Court denied Jefferson's candidacy as it ruled him ineligible for public office until 24 December 2023 due to a prior criminal conviction. After this ruling, the party nominated Padre Kelmon Souza for president, a self-proclaimed orthodox priest who is not part of the Brazilian Orthodox Churches, and Luiz Cláudio Gamonal — an evangelical pastor — for vice president. Kelmon was accused of beginning an "auxiliary line" for Jair Bolsonaro, making a campaign for Bolsonaro and not himself, and at debates exclusively attacking Bolsonaro's opponents and praising his presidency. When Jefferson previously had announced he would launch his candidacy, he announced that it would be to support the campaign of Jair Bolsonaro.

After the 2022 general elections, PTB elected only one federal deputy, failing to break through the electoral threshold and thus cutting access to party subsidies and free advertisement on television. On October, the PTB assembly voted to merge with right-wing conservative party Patriota in order to form a party tentatively titled Mais Brasil ("More Brazil"). The merger was approved by the Superior Electoral Court on 9 November 2023 and the party is now called the Democratic Renewal Party.

== Notable members ==
Members at the time of the merger

- Roberto Jefferson, former Federal Deputy for Rio de Janeiro (1983—2005, by PTB).
- Eduardo Cunha, former President of the Chamber of Deputies of Brazil (2015—2016, by MDB) and Federal Deputy for Rio de Janeiro (2003—2016, by MDB).
- Iolanda Fleming, former Governor of Acre (1986—1987, by MDB) and Vice Governor of Acre (1983—1986, by MDB).
- Daniel Silveira, Federal Deputy for Rio de Janeiro (2019—present, by PSL, UNIÃO and PTB).
- Fernando Collor de Mello, Senator for Alagoas (2007—present, by PTB, PROS, PTC, former President of Brazil (1990—1992, by Act), Governor of Alagoas (1987—1989, by MDB and PRN), Mayor of Maceió (1979—1983, by ARENA and PDS) and Federal Deputy for Alagoas (1983—1986, by PDS).

Former members

- Jair Bolsonaro, former President of Brasil (2019—2022, by PSL and PL) and Federal Deputy for Rio de Janeiro (1991—2018, by PSL, PSC, Progressives, DEM, PTB, PPR and PDC).
- Jânio Quadros, former President of Brazil (1961, by PTN), Governor of São Paulo (1955—1959, by PDC) and Mayor of São Paulo (1986—1988, by PTB, and 1953–1955, by PDC).
- Eduardo Paes, Mayor of Rio de Janeiro (2021—present, by DEM and PSD, and 2009–2016, by MDB) and former Federal Deputy for Rio de Janeiro (2002—2006, by PSDB, and 1999–2001, by PTB)
- Telmário Mota, Senator for Roraima (2015—present, by PDT, PTB and PROS).
- Ivete Vargas, former Federal Deputy for São Paulo (1983—1984, by PTB, and 1951–1969, by PTB (defunct) and MDB).
- Cristiane Brasil, former Federal Deputy for Rio de Janeiro (2015—2019, by PTB).

== Electoral history ==
=== Legislative elections ===
Election	Chamber of Deputies				Federal Senate				Role in government
Election	Votes	%	Seats	+/–	Votes	%	Seats	+/–	Role in government
1982	1,829,055	4.45%	13 / 479	New	1,909,452	4.53%	0 / 25	New	Opposition
1986	2,110,467	4.46%	17 / 487	▲4	N/A	N/A	0 / 49	0	Opposition
1990	2,277,882	5.62%	38 / 502	▲21	N/A	N/A	4 / 31	▲4	Coalition
1994	2,379,773	5.21%	31 / 513	▼7	4,015,701	4.19%	3 / 54	▼1	Coalition
1998	3,768,260	5.66%	31 / 513	0	2,449,479	3.96%	1 / 81	▼2	Coalition
2002	4,052,111	4.63%	26 / 513	▼5	5,190,032	3.38%	3 / 81	▲2	Coalition
2006	4,397,743	4.72%	22 / 513	▼4	2,676,469	3.17%	4 / 81	▲1	Coalition
2010	4,039,239	4.18%	21 / 513	▼1	7,999,589	4,69%	6 / 81	▲2	Coalition
2014	3,914,193	4.02%	25 / 513	▲4	2,803,999	3,14%	3 / 81	▼3	Coalition
2018	2,022,719	2.06%	10 / 513	▼15	1,899,838	1.11%	3 / 81	3	Coalition
2022	1,433,638	1.30%	1 / 513	▼9	3,621,532	3.56%	0 / 81	▼3	Opposition
