= Brazilian Labour Renewal Party =

Political party in Brazil

Brazilian Labour Renewal Party Partido Renovador Trabalhista Brasileiro
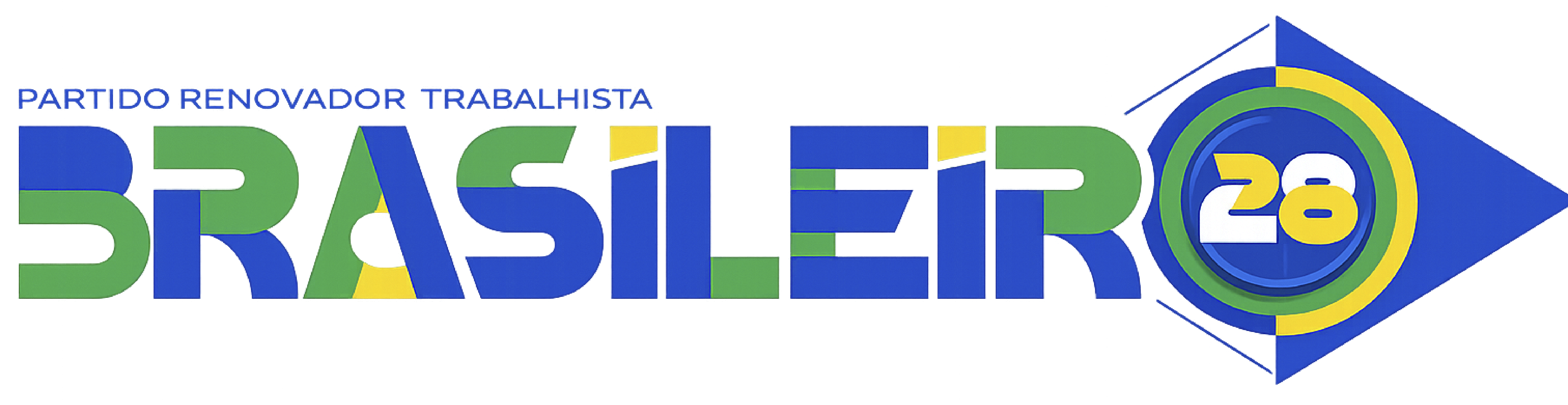
- President: Leonardo Avalanche
- Founder: Levy Fidelix
- Founded: 27 November 1994; 31 years ago
- Registered: 28 March 1995; 31 years ago
- Split from: Renovator Labour Party
- Headquarters: Brasília, Federal District; São Paulo, São Paulo
- Youth wing: PRTB Jovem
- Women's wing: PRTB Mulher
- Membership: 136,171
- Ideology: Brazilian nationalism; Conservatism; Social conservatism; Fiscal conservatism; Militarism; Janism; Christian right; Right-wing antiglobalism; Right-wing populism
- Political position: Far-right
- Colours: Green; Yellow; Blue; White
- Slogan: Homeland and family in first place!
- State assemblies: 7 / 1,024
- Mayors: 6 / 5,568
- City Councillors: 220 / 56,810

Website
- prtb.org.br

The Brazilian Labour Renewal Party (Portuguese: Partido Renovador Trabalhista Brasileiro, PRTB), or Brazilian (Portuguese: Brasileiro), is a conservative Brazilian political party. It was founded in 1994 and its electoral number is 28. According to the party's official website, the PRTB described its ideology main ideology as participatory economics, proposing "to establish an economic system based on participatory decision making as the primary economic mechanism for allocation in society". Despite this, the actual political stance has been characterized as socially and fiscally conservative, and aligned to the far-right. The PRTB was led by Levy Fidelix, known for his nationalist and socially conservative positions, from 1994 until his death in 2021.

The PRTB gained national prominence when its member Hamilton Mourão, was elected as Vice President of Brazil in 2018 on the ticket of Jair Bolsonaro. However, Mourão left PRTB in 2022.

== Overview ==
It comes from members of the extinct Renovator Labour Party, a party that functioned between 1985 and 1993, which had merged with the Social Labour Party, originating the Progressive Party. This group, led by Levy Fidelix, had already tried to organize the PTRB, which only ran in the 1994 elections.

During the 1998 Brazilian general election, Fernando Collor de Mello decided to run again for the office of President of Brazil for the same party that elected him in 1989: the National Reconstruction Party (PRN), now the Christian Labour Party (PTC). The PRTB, together with the PRN, formed the Renova Brasil (Renew Brazil) coalition, in support of the former President of the Republic. The Superior Electoral Court (TSE), however, prevented his candidacy from materializing, due to the eight-year period in which he could not be elected to any elective term.

It was registered on the Superior Electoral Court on 18 February 1997 and Levy Fidelix was elected as party president.

In 2006, the party gained electoral importance because of the election of ex-President Fernando Collor de Mello, impeached in 1992, who made his comeback in national politics as a Senator. However, in 2007 De Mello left PRTB and switched to the Brazilian Labour Party.

The party candidated its president Levy Fidelix in the Brazilian presidential election of 2010 and he obtained 57,960 votes (0.06%). In the second round, Fidelix endorsed left-wing candidate Dilma Rousseff.

In the Brazilian general election of 2014, Fidelix was candidate again and presented himself with a conservative speech and, according to him, the only right-wing candidate. In the first round of the general election, Fidelix received 446,878 votes, representing 0.43% of the popular vote. The PRTB's founder ranked seventh out of 11 candidates, however achieved his best performance in an election throughout his career. In the second round, Fidelix supported candidate Aécio Neves.

For the Brazilian general election of 2018, the PRTB formed the coalition "Brazil above everything, God above everyone" (Brasil acima de tudo, Deus acima de todos) together with the Social Liberal Party to support candidate Jair Bolsonaro. In May 2018, his pick for Vice President, Hamilton Mourão, joined the party.

Party founder Levy Fidelix died in 2021 due to COVID-19 complications.

After the death of Levy Fidelix and the affiliation of influencer Pablo Marçal to the party, the party adopted a new phase, inspired by his worldview, coined the name 'Governalismo'.

According to Marçal, "Governalismo is based on the idea that each Brazilian is unique and was born with the mission of governing themselves, their family and their sphere of influence" and that "values the individuality of each Brazilian, so freedom, respect for differences and tolerance are fundamental principles".

Governalism proposes overcoming the country's current polarization, where, according to the author himself, capitalist (right) and socialist (left) ideas have limitations and cause "national division between two extremes, leading Brazilians to see each other as enemies simply because they think differently. This consumes all energies and diverts focus from the future, creating an environment of hatred, intolerance and fear."

The influencer argues that this division, which began in the French Revolution, hinders "the nation's progress towards sustainable development and prosperity". He has also stated several times that he is "neither a capitalist nor a communist."

For this ideology, the role of the state is to help people fulfill their mission in society. "The state should be a support, not a limit". With this, he "advocates decentralization and specific actions by the state to promote the progress of families". To reiterate: the state must play a supplementary role, "fostering the development of families, categories and regions according to their specific needs".

Governalism proposes three pillars that underpin all actions and projects: Virtualization, Entrepreneurialization and Change of Mentality.

== Controversies ==
The party has been accused of having links with neo-Nazi and neo-fascist organizations and promoting fake news and conspiracy theories on the internet.

During the 2014 Brazilian general election, the party leader and candidate Levy Fidelix during a debate made a statement that homosexuals “need psychological care” and were better kept “well away from [the rest of] us." He also said that Brazil’s population of 200 million would be reduced by half if homosexuality were encouraged because “the excretory system” does not function as a means of reproduction. Fidelix obtained 0.43% of votes.

== Election results ==
=== Presidential elections ===
Election	Candidate	Running mate	Colligation	First round		Second round		Result
Election	Candidate	Running mate	Colligation	Votes	%	Votes	%	Result
1998	Didn't contest							
2002	Didn't contest							
2006	Didn't contest							
2010	Levy Fidelix (PRTB)	Luiz Eduardo Ayres Duarte (PRTB)	None	57,960	0.06 (#7)	-	-	Lost ✗
2014	Levy Fidelix (PRTB)	José Alves de Oliveira (PRTB)	None	446,878	0.43 (#7)	-	-	Lost ✗
2018	Jair Bolsonaro (PSL)	Hamilton Mourão (PRTB)	Brazil above everything, God above everyone PSL; PRTB	49,227,010	46,03 (#1)	57,797,121	55,13 (#1)	Elected ✓
2022	Didn't contest							
2026	Didn't contest							
Source: Election Resources: Federal Elections in Brazil – Results Lookup

=== Legislative elections ===
Election	Chamber of Deputies				Federal Senate				Role in government
Election	Votes	%	Seats	+/–	Votes	%	Seats	+/–	Role in government
1994	154,666 (Note: Votes obtained in coalition with PV, PCB and PSTU.)	0.34%	0 / 513	New	—N/a				Extra-parliamentary
1998	53,778	0.08%	0 / 513	0	67,586	0.11%	0 / 81	New	Extra-parliamentary
2002	304,092	0.35%	0 / 513	0	27,301	0.02%	0 / 81	0	Extra-parliamentary
2006	171,908	0.18%	0 / 513	0	644,111	0.76%	1 / 81	▲1	Independent
2010	307,925	0.32%	2 / 513	▲2	74,478	0.04%	0 / 81	▼1	Independent
2014	454,190	0.74%	1 / 513	▼1	38,429	0.04%	0 / 81	0	Independent
2018	684,976	0.70%	0 / 513	▼1	886,267	0.52%	0 / 81	0	Extra-parliamentary
2022	294,315	0.27%	0 / 513	0	758,938	0.75%	0 / 81	0	Extra-parliamentary
2026	Didn't contest		0 / 513	0	39,609	0.02%	0 / 81	0	Extra-parliamentary

== Notable members ==
Current members
Name	Birth date	Relevant offices by PRTB	Relevant offices by other parties
Havanir Nimtz	7 September 1953		State deputy of São Paulo (2003—2007, by PRONA, PSDB and Act)

Former members
Name	Birth date	Death date	Relevant offices by PRTB	Relevant offices by other parties
Fernando Collor de Mello	12 August 1949	living		President of Brazil (1990—1992, by Act); Governor of Alagoas (1987—1989, by MDB and Act); Senator for Alagoas (2019—present, by Act, PROS and PL, and 2007—2019, by PTB and Act); Mayor of Maceió (1979—1983, by ARENA and PDS); Federal Deputy for Alagoas (1983—1986, by PDS)
Antônio Hamilton Mourão	15 August 1953	living	Vice President of Brazil (2019—present, by PRTB and Republicans)	
Joaquim Roriz	4 August 1936	27 September 2018		Governor of the Federal District (1999—2006, by MDB, 1991—1995, by PTR and PP, 1988—1990, by MDB and PTR); Vice Governor of Goiás (1986—1987, by MDB); Senator for the Federal District (2007, by MDB); Mayor of Goiânia (1987—1988, by MDB); Federal Deputy for Goiás (1982—1986, by MDB); State Deputy of Goiás (1978—1982, by PT and MDB)
Áureo Ribeiro	17 February 1979	living	Federal Deputy for Rio de Janeiro (2011—present, by Solidarity and PRTB)	
Janaina Paschoal	25 June 1974	living	State deputy of São Paulo (2019—present, by PP, PSL and PRTB)	
Levy Fidelix	27 December 1951	23 April 2021	National President of PRTB (1994—2021)	

Preceded by 27 - CD (DC)	Numbers of Brazilian Official Political Parties; 28 - BLRP (PRTB)	Succeeded by 29 - WCP (PCO)
