= Fabiano Soares =

Brazilian footballer and manager (born 1966)

Personal information
- Full name: Fabiano Soares Pessoa
- Date of birth: 10 June 1966 (age 60)
- Place of birth: Mutum, Brazil
- Height: 1.78 m (5 ft 10 in)
- Position: Attacking midfielder

Team information
- Current team: Tirol (head coach)

Senior career*
Years	Team	Apps	(Gls)
1987	Botafogo		
1988	Cruzeiro		
1989	São José-SP		
1989–1992	Celta	101	(16)
1992–2003	Compostela	334	(44)
2001	→ Botafogo (loan)	25	(0)
2003–2004	Racing Ferrol	24	(2)
Total		484+	(62+)

Managerial career
- 2006–2007: Compostela
- 2008–2009: Bergantiños
- 2009–2010: Compostela
- 2010–2011: Estradense
- 2011–2015: Estoril (assistant)
- 2015–2016: Estoril
- 2017: Athletico Paranaense
- 2019: Jeonnam Dragons
- 2021: Barra-SC
- 2022: Vitória
- 2022–2023: Compostela
- 2023–2024: River-PI
- 2024: Atlético Tubarão
- 2025–: Tirol
- * Club domestic league appearances and goals

Fabiano Soares Pessoa (born 10 June 1966), known simply as Fabiano as a player, is a Brazilian former professional footballer who played as an attacking midfielder. He is currently head coach of Tirol.

His career was mostly associated with Compostela, as both a player and manager. Over ten seasons, he played 364 competitive matches for the club and scored 47 goals.

In 2006, Soares started working as a coach.

== Playing career ==
=== Celta ===
Born in Mutum, Minas Gerais, Fabiano started his career with Botafogo, Cruzeiro and São José Esporte Clube. In 1989, immediately after having finished runner-up in the Campeonato Paulista with the latter club and suffered the loss of his father, he moved to Spain where he would remain the following 15 years, starting out at Celta de Vigo.

Fabiano made his La Liga debut on 17 September 1989, coming on as a late substitute in a 2–0 away loss against Athletic Bilbao. He scored his first goal in the Spanish top flight on 14 January 1990, contributing to a 5–1 home win over Cádiz as the season ended in relegation.

=== Compostela ===
In 1992, after two additional campaigns in the Segunda División, Fabiano signed with neighbouring Compostela also in that level. He helped to a first-ever promotion for the Galicians in 1994 and, over the course of the following four seasons, was a midfield mainstay, notably netting in consecutive home draws against Real Madrid (1–1 on 2 April 1995, and 3–3 on 25 February 1996) and scoring once in the 6–2 away rout of Deportivo de La Coruña in a local derby in May 1998.

At the end of 2002–03, Compos were relegated to Segunda División B for financial irregularities. Fabiano subsequently left and joined another team in that region, Racing de Ferrol, retiring at the end of the season at the age of 38.

== Coaching career ==
Soares started working as a coach in 2006, with former club Compostela in the regional leagues. He held a UEFA PRO Licence, his course classmates including future football heavyweights like Luis Enrique and Pep Guardiola.

From 2008 to 2011, Soares was in charge of amateurs Bergantiños, Compostela again – taking the reins of the latter after the ninth round, he eventually failed to prevent relegation from the third tier as last– and Estradense.

In summer 2011, Soares was appointed assistant coach at Estoril from Portugal, going on to work under several managers including compatriot Vinícius Eutrópio and Marco Silva. In March 2015, following José Couceiro's departure, both he and former club player Hugo Leal took the reins until the end of the season, eventually leading the team to the 12th position in the Primeira Liga; in July, he was appointed the sole head coach.

On 11 December 2016, after only 15 points in 13 matches during the campaign, Soares was relieved of his duties. The following 11 July, he returned to his home country after being named Athletico Paranaense manager; he was sacked on 4 December, with his side having finished in 11th position.

Soares was hired at K League 2 title favourites Jeonnam Dragons in January 2019. He was dismissed in July, with the team third from bottom.

In April 2021, Soares was appointed at Barra-SC, but left by mutual agreement on 17 June, two weeks before the start of the Campeonato Catarinense Série B. On 26 April 2022, he signed for Vitória of the Campeonato Brasileiro Série C, being sacked on 19 June.

Soares returned to Compostela's bench in summer 2022. On 22 March 2023, however, in spite of being placed second in the Segunda Federación with 45 points with eight matches remaining, he was fired.

On 6 November 2023, Soares was appointed head coach of River Atlético Clube for the upcoming season. In March 2024, in the same capacity, he joined fellow Série D club Atlético Tubarão.

On 12 December 2024, Soares became the manager of Tirol.
