= Mutum, Minas Gerais =

Municipality in Minas Gerais, Brazil

- Municipality
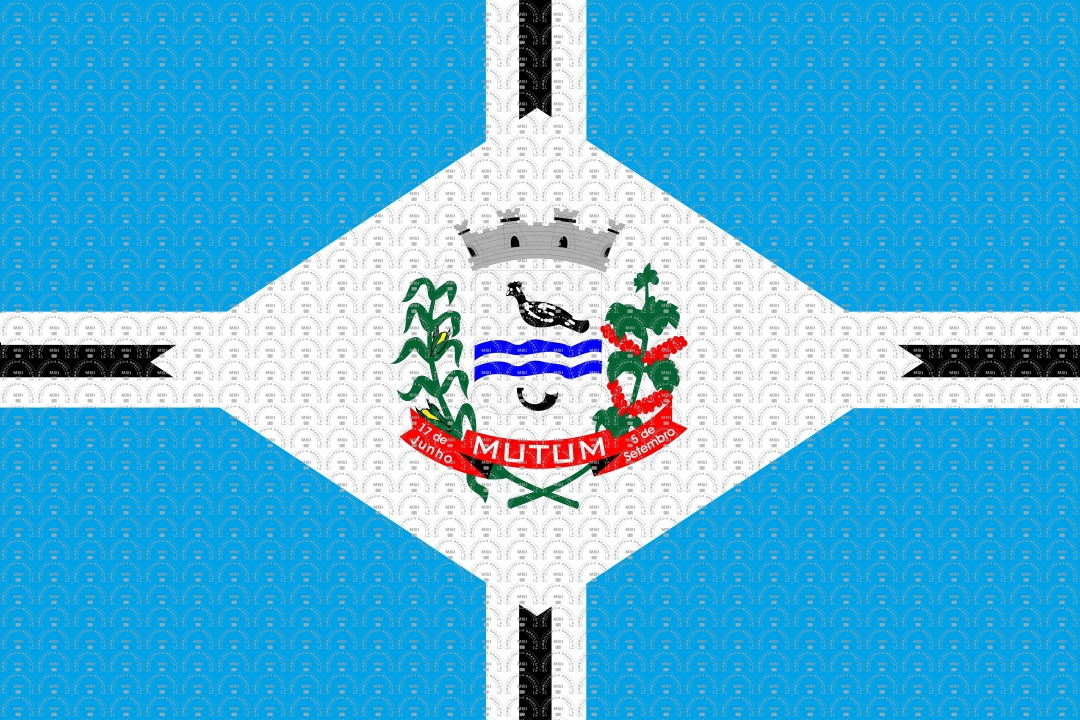
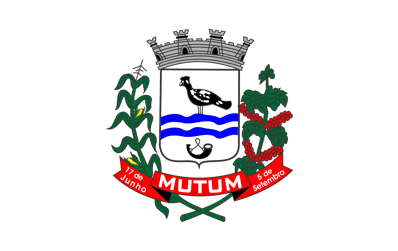
- Flag Coat of arms
- Interactive map of Mutum, Minas Gerais
- Country: Brazil
- State: Minas Gerais
- Region: Southeast
- Time zone: UTC−3 (BRT)

Location of Mutum

Mutum is a Brazilian municipality in the interior of the state of Minas Gerais, in the Southeast Region of the country. Its population in the 2022 census was 27,635. The municipality is surrounded by Pedra Invejada, Pedra do Facão, and Pedra do Gaspar, symbols of ecotourism in the Caparaó region.

== Etymology ==
The name "Mutum" comes from the abundance of the bird of the same name in the region at the time of the city's founding. "Mutum" is the common name for galliform birds of the Cracidae family, forest-dwelling birds of the genera Crax and Mitu, with several species threatened with extinction. These birds generally have black plumage, with crested or smooth feathers on their heads and brightly colored beaks.

== History ==
The first inhabitants of Mutum were the Botocudos indigenous people, who came from the Recôncavo region of Bahia, expelled by the Guarani in warfare. In the early 19th century (1809), the region was no longer "forbidden" by the crown, and people began to settle near the Rio Pardo (now the municipality of Iúna, Espírito Santo). The first settlers were muleteers, with their distinctive Creole-style clothing, who established small ranches and transported goods on mules. Small inns were formed, followed by Jesuit missionaries and priests who built chapels. A small village developed, attracting people on weekends for religious services and commerce. Festivals were held in June (the traditional "Festa Junina" of Saint John), featuring pork cracklings, flour cakes, barbecues, cornbread, and potatoes. The dances included the quadrilha, congo, and boi-bumbá, which remain important folk traditions.

Mutum is located in what was once called the "Região das Matas" (Forest Region). The city is rich in natural beauty, including numerous waterfalls, making it attractive to nature lovers. The municipality has lesser-known tourist attractions, such as an indigenous archaeological park discovered by the Rodrigues da Fonseca family. Today, it hosts a major agricultural fair in July, alongside the "Encontro do Mutuense Ausente" (Gathering of Absent Mutuenses), when those born there but living elsewhere return to visit their hometown, friends, and witness the changes.

== Geography ==
According to the regional division established in 2017 by the IBGE, the municipality belongs to the Intermediate Geographic Region of Juiz de Fora and the Immediate Geographic Region of Manhuaçu. Previously, under the microregion and mesoregion divisions, it was part of the Aimorés microregion, which was included in the Vale do Rio Doce mesoregion.

=== Geographic Location ===
The municipality of Mutum is located in the Vale do Rio Doce region. It covers an area of 1,256.08 km² and is bordered to the north by Aimorés and Pocrane, to the south by Chalé and Lajinha, to the east by Ibatiba (ES), Brejetuba (ES), and Afonso Cláudio (ES), and to the west by Taparuba and Conceição de Ipanema.

Besides the headquarters, the municipality has six districts (Ocidente, Centenário, Humaitá, Imbiruçu, Santa Rita do Mutum, and Roseiral, whose registry office was established on August 28, 1892), four villages (São Roque, Santa Maria, Santa Efigênia, Lajinha do Mutum, Palha Branca, and Povoado dos Franças), and 54 communities. The headquarters is at an altitude of 240 meters, at coordinates 19°49'01" S and 41°26'18" W.

Mutum is served by highway MG-108, which connects to the city of Lajinha (MG) and BR-262 (paved) to the south, and by BR-474, which provides access to Aimorés to the north, with a paved section (42 km) and an unpaved section (28 km).

=== Hydrography ===
It is traversed by the São Manoel, Mutum, and José Pedro rivers.

=== Relief ===
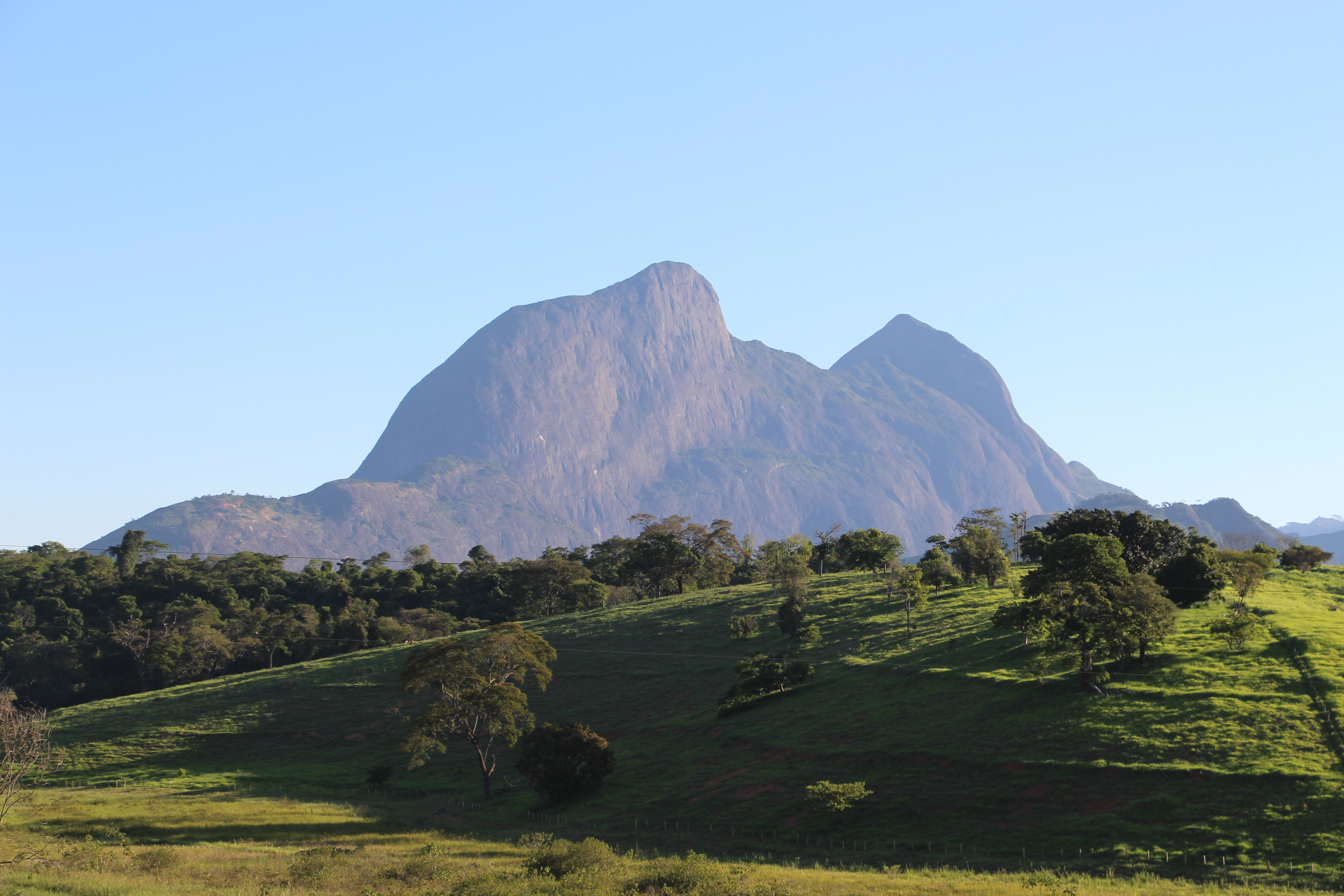
Pedra Invejada in 2015.

The relief consists partly of lowlands, influenced by the Rio Doce valley, where several lagoons are found, and partly of mountains. The municipality marks the boundary where the lowlands end and the elevations leading to the Serra do Caparaó begin. Notable elevations include Pedra Pirraça or Pedra Santa (located in the Imbiruçu district), where a small wooden church was built by carpenter Teófilo Belmiro, dedicated to Our Lady of Montserrat. The church was destroyed by wind and time, rebuilt twice, and now stands as a masonry structure. At the top of the rock, a spring considered holy never dries up. Other landmarks include Pedra do Gaspar, Pedra do Facão, and especially Pedra Invejada, one of the most beautiful landscapes in inland Minas Gerais.

The districts of Roseiral, Humaitá, and Imbiruçu have mountainous terrain with altitudes exceeding 1,000 meters above sea level. The area is known for coffee production, morning fog, and golden sunsets in June.

Due to the elevation changes, the municipality has several beautiful waterfalls, particularly on the São Manoel River.

=== Vegetation ===
The predominant vegetation is Atlantic Forest. The tallest trees reach 25–30 meters. The forest is rich in vines and epiphytes. Species like peroba (Aspidosperma sp.), cedar (Cedrella spp.), jacaranda (Machaerium villosum), heart-of-palm (Euterpe edulis), Brazilwood (Caesalpina echinata), and yellow ipê (Tabebuia sp.) were historically exploited.

The Atlantic Forest's fertile soils, including terra roxa, support coffee, sugarcane, corn, rice, and beans. Grasslands are dominated by Guinea grass (Panicum maximum).

Unfortunately, the municipality is increasingly invaded by eucalyptus plantations, which destroy native vegetation, reduce biodiversity, and displace traditional cattle farming and coffee production.

== Economy ==
Mutum's economy is primarily agricultural, with coffee, corn, beans, and cattle as key products. The dairy sector is prominent, with several dairy factories such as Laticínios Porto Alegre, Mutumilk, Laticínios Lito, and Laticínios São Roque.

The banking sector includes branches of Banco do Brasil, Sicoob, Itaú, and a Caixa Econômica Federal lottery outlet.

The annual Exposição Agropecuária de Mutum (ExpoMutum) in July features rodeos, food stalls, amusement parks, national and regional shows, and a traditional bingo game, boosting the local economy.

== Education ==
The city has several primary and secondary schools, including 13 state schools offering fundamental to technical education, as well as EJA (Youth and Adult Education) and CESEC.

Mutum also has distance learning centers affiliated with Uniasselvi and Universidade Cruzeiro do Sul, as well as a UAITEC (Open Integrated University) center.

== Religion ==
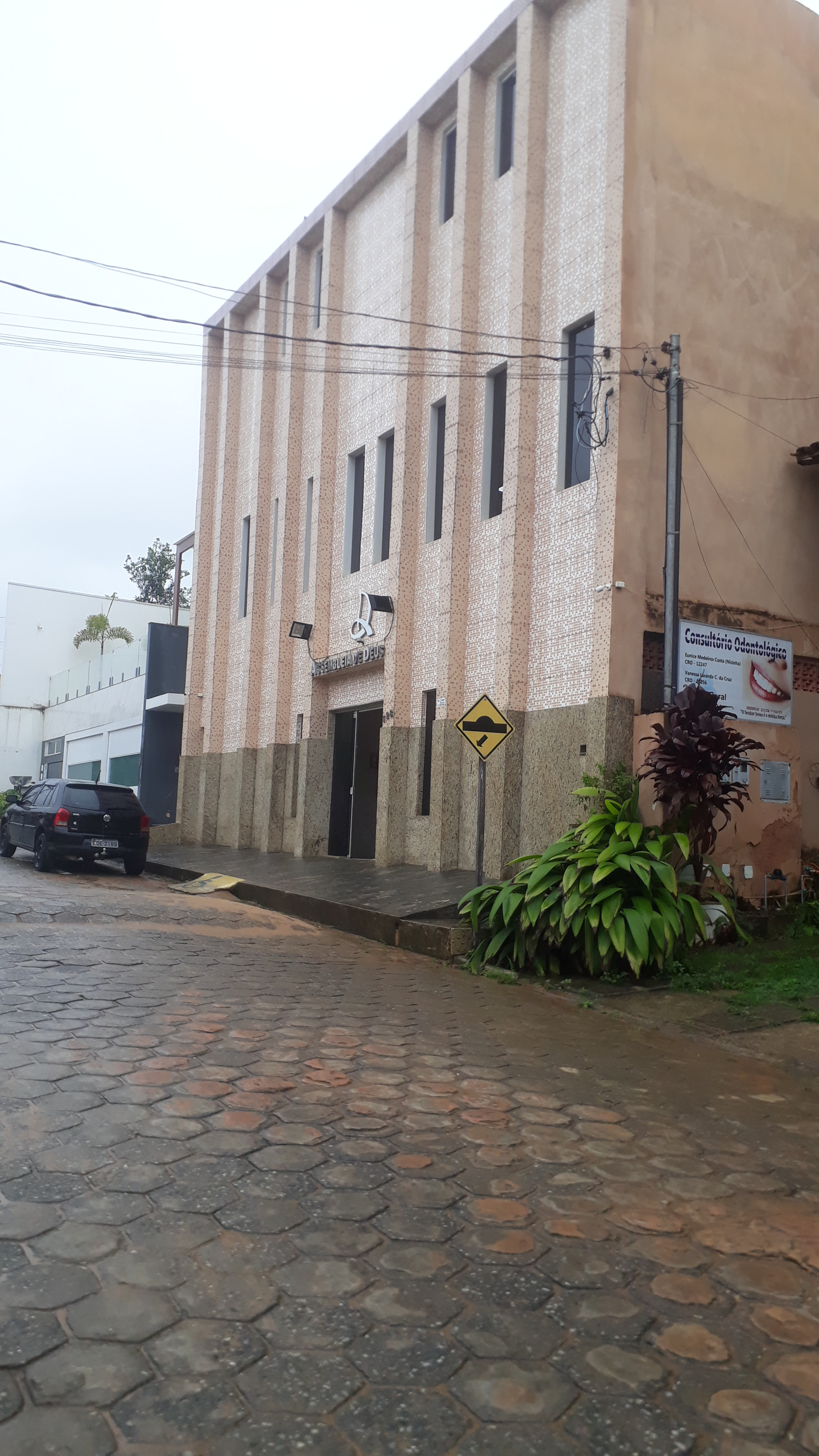
Assembly of God Church in Mutum, 2025

According to the 2022 IBGE census, Mutum has diverse religious affiliations: 13,032 Catholics, 8,303 Evangelicals (including Assemblies of God, Baptists, Presbyterians, Adventists, etc.), 101 Spiritists, 40 Umbanda and Candomblé practitioners, 285 other religions, and 2,234 non-religious.

== Notable Citizens ==
- Levy Fidelix
- Vinícius Eutrópio
- Ramon Menezes

== See also ==
- List of municipalities in Minas Gerais
- List of municipalities in Brazil
