= Lajinha =

- Municipality
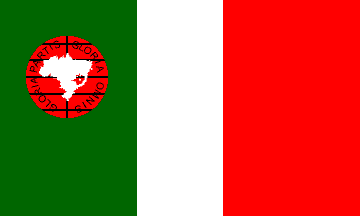
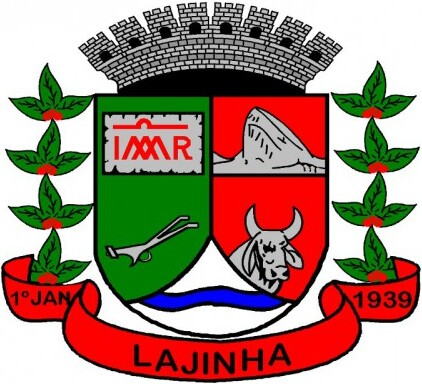
- Flag Coat of arms

- Location in Minas Gerais state

- Location in Brazil
- Coordinates: 20°9′3″S 41°37′22″W
- Country: Brazil
- Region: Southeast
- State: Minas Gerais
- Mesoregion: Zona da Mata
- Microregion: Manhuaçu

Area
  - Total: 431.92 km^{2} (166.77 sq mi)

Population (2020)
  - Total: 19,918
  - Density: 46.115/km^{2} (119.44/sq mi)
- Time zone: UTC−3 (BRT)

Lajinha is a municipality in the northeastern part of the state of Minas Gerais, Brazil. As of 2020, the population was estimated to be 19,918. It has an area of 431.92 square kilometres (166.77 sq mi). The town borders the state Espírito Santo to the east.

== Neighboring municipalities ==
- Chalé, Minas Gerais
- Ibatiba, Espírito Santo
- Mutum, Minas Gerais
- Iúna, Espírito Santo

== Population history ==
Year	Population
2004	20,706
2015	20,262
2020	19,918

== See also ==
- List of municipalities in Minas Gerais
