= Lajinha (disambiguation) =

Lajinha may refer to:

- Lajinha, a municipality in the state of Minas Gerais, Brazil
- Lajinha (beach), a beach in the island of São Vicente, Cape Verde
- O mar na Lajinha, a novel published in 2004 by Germano Almeida
