= Hamilton Mourão =

Brazilian politician (born 1953)

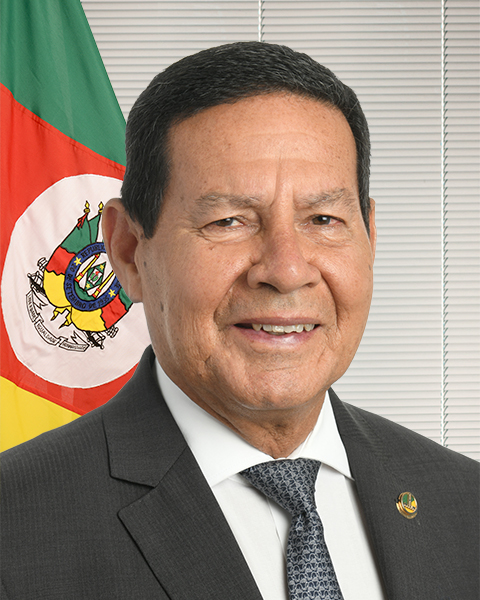
- Official portrait, 2023

25th Vice President of Brazil
- In office 1 January 2019 – 1 January 2023
- President: Jair Bolsonaro
- Preceded by: Michel Temer
- Succeeded by: Geraldo Alckmin

Member of the Federal Senate
- Incumbent
- Assumed office 1 February 2023
- Preceded by: Lasier Martins
- Constituency: Rio Grande do Sul

President of the Military Club
- In office 26 June 2018 – 10 September 2018
- Preceded by: Gilberto Pimentel
- Succeeded by: Eduardo José Barbosa

Personal details
- Born: 15 August 1953 (age 73) Porto Alegre, Rio Grande do Sul, Brazil
- Party: Republicanos (2022–present)
- Other political affiliations: PRTB (2018–2022)
- Spouse(s): Elisabeth Rossell (m. 1976; died 2016) Paula de Oliveira (m. 2018)
- Children: 2
- Education: Agulhas Negras Military Academy

Military service
- Allegiance: Brazil
- Branch/service: Brazilian Army
- Years of service: 1971–2018
- Rank: General
- Commands: 27th Field Artillery Group; 2nd Jungle Infantry Brigade; 6th Army Division; Southern Military Command; Secretariat of Economy and Finances

Antônio Hamilton Martins Mourão (Brazilian Portuguese pronunciation: [ɐ̃ˈtoni.u ɐˈmiwtõ maʁˈtʃĩz mowˈɾɐ̃w, ɐ̃ˈtonju -]; born 15 August 1953) is a Brazilian politician and retired military officer who served as the 25th vice president of Brazil from 2019 to 2023.

Mourão served in the Brazilian Army for almost five decades from 1971 to 2018, retiring as a General, the highest rank a Brazilian soldier can reach during peace time. During his tenure in the military, he became nationally-known after a 2015 incident in which he criticized then-President Dilma Rousseff and called for "the awakening of a patriotic struggle".

In the 2018 election, Mourão intended to run for President as a member of the far-right Brazilian Labour Renewal Party. However, he dropped out of the race in order to join Jair Bolsonaro's successful campaign as his running mate. The two were elected in the second round of the election, and Mourão took office as Vice President on 1 January 2019.

Mourão is a controversial figure, owing to his praise of the military dictatorship in Brazil (1964–1985), during which he had served in the military. Nonetheless, during the Bolsonaro presidency, he was sometimes seen as a moderate voice in the administration. His public disputes with Bolsonaro led to friction with Bolsonaro and his supporters, including calls for Mourão's impeachment from Bolsonaro-supporting members of Congress. Bolsonaro did not choose Mourão as his running mate in the 2022 election, instead picking Walter Souza Braga Netto in a losing presidential bid. Mourão opted instead to run for the Senate in the 2022 Brazilian general election, representing the state of Rio Grande do Sul, which he won.

== Early life ==
Mourão was born in Porto Alegre, Rio Grande do Sul, the son of General Antônio Hamilton Mourão and Wanda Coronel Martins. He retired on 28 February 2018. He is of Indigenous Brazilian descent, and declares himself Indigenous Brazilian. Hamilton is a practicing Roman Catholic and a Freemason, although the Catholic Church prohibits Catholics from being freemasons.

== Military career ==
=== Military career ===
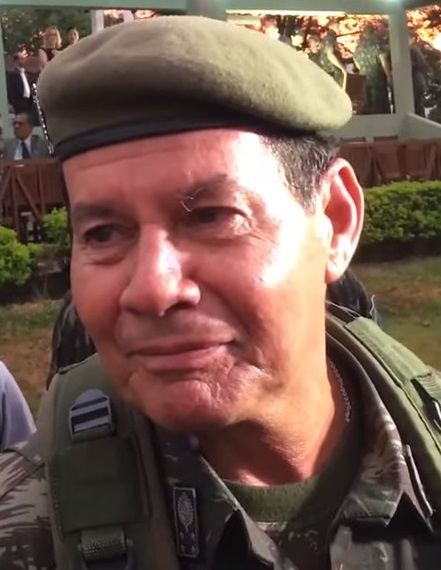
General Mourão in 2016

Mourão joined the Brazilian Army in February 1972, in the Academia Militar das Agulhas Negras (AMAN), in Resende, Rio de Janeiro, where he became on officer on December 12, 1975. As lieutenant, he was instructor at Military Academy and as Captain, he worked with Jair Bolsonaro in the 8th Paratrooper Field Artillery Group, placed in Rio de Janeiro.

He later had classes at the Escola de Comando e Estado-Maior do Exército (ECEME) where he graduated as Staff Officer and attended classes of Politics, Strategy and Army High Administration. He also trained in Basic Parachuting, Jump Master and Free Jump.

During his military career he was an instructor at AMAN, was part of a peace mission in Angola and was the Military Attache for Brazil's Embassy to Venezuela. He commanded the 27th Field Artillery Group in Ijuí, Rio Grande do Sul; the 2nd Jungle Infantry Brigade in São Gabriel da Cachoeira, Amazonas; the 6th Army Division and Military Command of the South in Porto Alegre, Rio Grande do Sul. Leaving the active service in 2018, Mourão considered running for president of the Military Club.

== Political career ==
=== Entrance into politics in 2015 ===
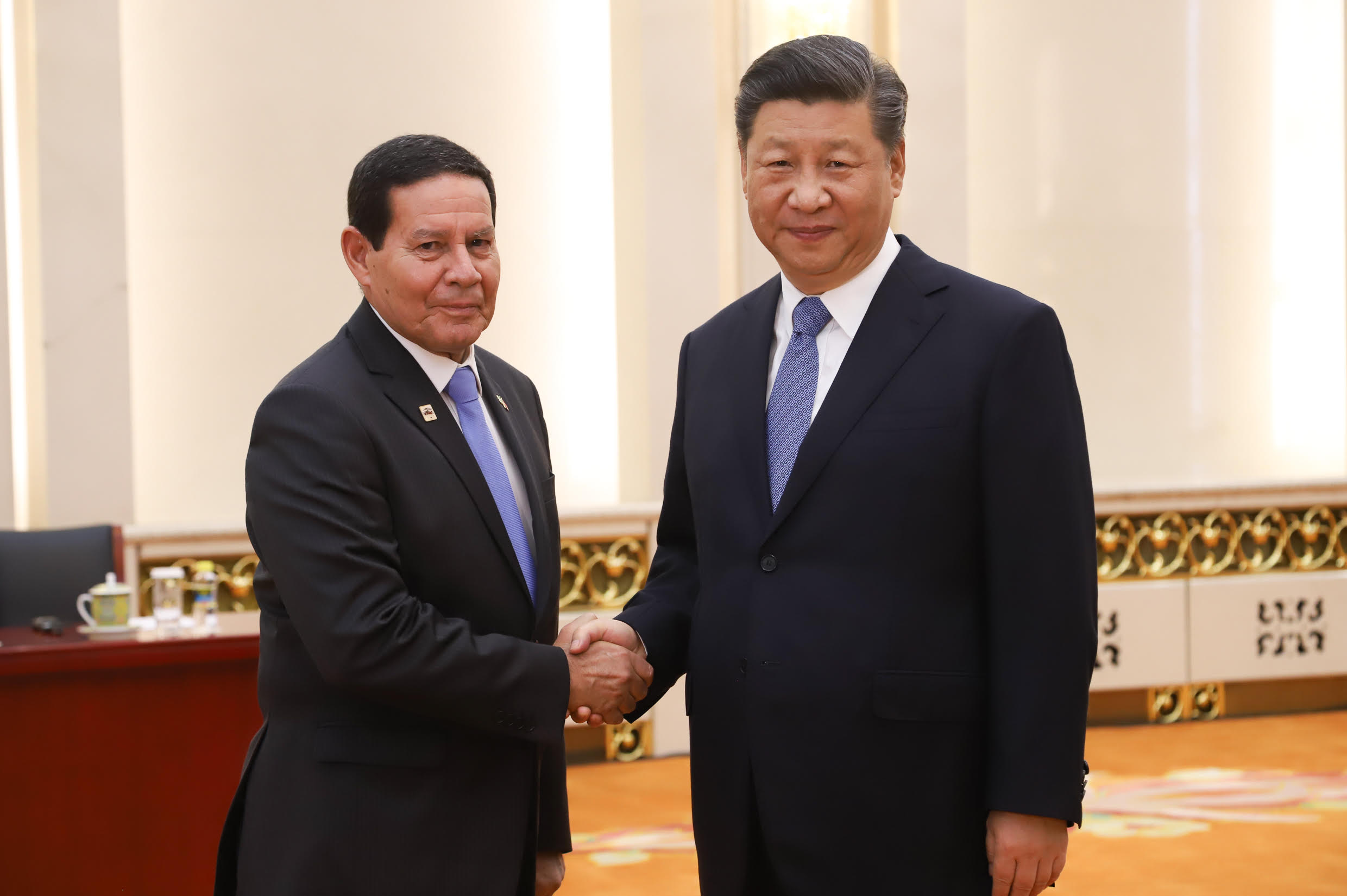
Mourão with Chinese President Xi Jinping, Beijing, 24 May 2019

Mourão gained fame in 2015 during the political crisis in the second term of president Dilma Rousseff, when he was transferred from the Military Command of the South (CMS) to the Secretary of Economy and Finance, in the Federal District, due to statements made in a speech about the current state of politics.

In a public announcement of the Masonic Lodge Grande Oriente in September 2017, in the Federal District, Mourão stated that, "among the duties of the Brazilian Army, there was the guarantee of the operation of the institutions and of the law and order", and that, if the judiciary "couldn't be able to heal the existing politics in the country, this would be imposed by the army through a military intervention", which, in his vision, "is provided by the Federal Constitution of 1988".

However, in May 2018, following the truck drivers' strike, Mourão spoke against calls for military intervention in the government, stating that "if the government lacks conditions to govern, leave, resign. Call elections earlier, do whatever, but end its immobilism", and that "the country cannot descend to chaos". He also called the Unified Federation of Oil Workers' strike, "shameful", and said "there are people taking advantage [of the situation] on both sides".

=== 2018 vice presidential candidacy ===
On 8 May 2018, Mourão announced his membership in the Brazilian Labor Renewal Party (PRTB) and his intention to run for President of Brazil, along with Levy Fidelix. However, in August 2018, Mourão became vice presidential running mate of far-right Presidential candidate Jair Bolsonaro.

On 28 October 2018, Jair Bolsonaro won 55.2% of the vote against 44.8% for Fernando Haddad of the left-wing Workers' Party in the Brazilian presidential election.

=== Vice President of Brazil (2019–2023) ===
On 1 January 2019, Mourão was sworn in as the Vice President of Brazil. He has been seen as a more moderate figure in the President Jair Bolsonaro’s government, causing rivalry with Bolsonaro.

In February 2022, Mourão was disauthorized by Brazilian President Jair Bolsonaro for saying that Brazil opposed the Russian invasion of Ukraine. Bolsonaro stated that the President is the one who makes statements about that subject.

In March 2022, Mourão changed his political affiliation to Republicanos, declaring his intention to run for the Senate in the 2022 Brazilian general election, to represent the state of Rio Grande do Sul. He also declared his support for the reelection of Jair Bolsonaro.

As Bolsonaro left the country on 30 December, on the 31st, Mourão as the acting president, did the last statement before the end of his term. Mourão attacked the 2022 Brazilian election protests and "leaderships" of the legislative and judiciary for creating a "climate of chaos" "with inopportune and deleterious silence or protagonism" in Brazil attempting a coup, leaving the Armed Forces and the Brazilian people to "pay the bill".

=== Senator from Rio Grande do Sul (2023-present) ===
In the 2022 Brazilian general election, Mourão ran for Senate to represent the state of Rio Grande do Sul as a member of the Republicanos party. He assumed the office on 1 February 2023.

== Personal life ==
Mourão became a widower in December 2016. He married Paula Mourão in October 2018. Paula is a first lieutenant of the Brazilian Army, where the couple met. They made their relationship public in 2017. The Mourãos own residences in Brasília and Rio de Janeiro.

Mourão is a practising Catholic.

Party political offices
Preceded by José Alves de Oliveira	PRTB nominee for Vice President of Brazil; 2018	Most recent
Political offices
Vacant Title last held by Michel Temer	Vice President of Brazil; 2019–2023	Succeeded by Geraldo Alckmin
