= Leonardo Avalanche =

Brazilian politician

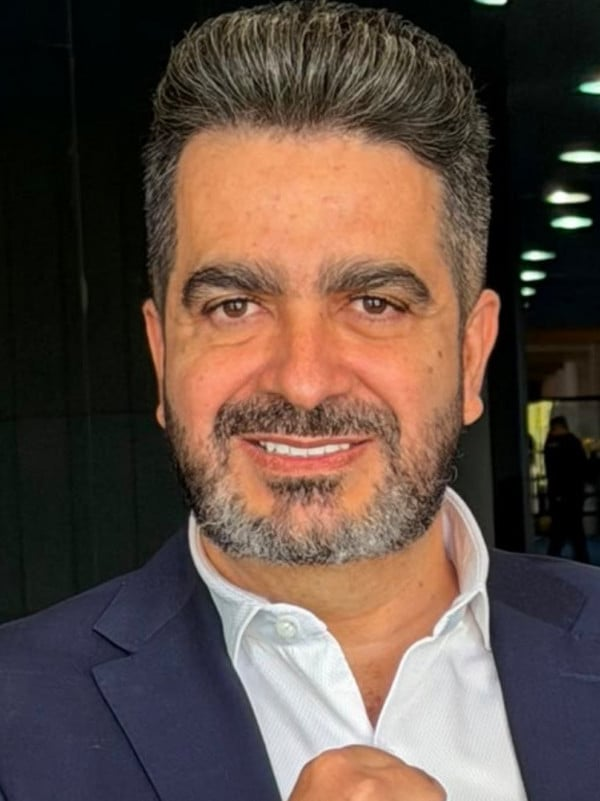

President of the Brazilian Labour Renewal Party
- Incumbent
- Assumed office 23 February 2024

Personal details
- Born: Leonardo Alves de Araújo; 1977 (age 48–49) Anápolis, Goiás, Brazil
- Party: Brazilian Labour Renewal Party (PRTB)
- Occupation: Businessman, politician

Leonardo Alves de Araújo, better known as Leonardo Avalanche, (born 1977) is a Brazilian businessman and politician who has served as the national president of the Brazilian Labour Renewal Party (PRTB) since 2024. In July 2026, he was announced as the party's pre-candidate for President of Brazil in the 2026 Brazilian general election.

His presidency of the PRTB coincided with the party's increased national visibility during Pablo Marçal's campaign for mayor of São Paulo in 2024.

== Early life ==
Avalanche was born in Anápolis, in the state of Goiás, in 1989. He is the son of an evangelical pastor.

Before entering party leadership, he worked in the private sector and later became involved in political organization within the PRTB.

== Political career ==
=== President of the PRTB ===
On 23 February 2024, Avalanche was elected national president of the Brazilian Labour Renewal Party (PRTB). His election came after an internal dispute over the party's leadership following the death of its founder, Levy Fidelix.

Under his leadership, the PRTB gained national prominence during the 2024 São Paulo mayoral election, serving as the party of businessman Pablo Marçal. Avalanche acted as one of the principal political coordinators of Marçal's campaign.

During 2025, he advocated expanding the PRTB's role within Brazil's conservative political movement and publicly stated that the party would be open to supporting prominent right-wing figures in the 2026 presidential election.

=== 2026 presidential campaign ===
On 15 July 2026, the PRTB officially announced Avalanche as its pre-candidate for President of Brazil.

The announcement followed the departure of Pablo Marçal from the party, making Avalanche the PRTB's prospective presidential nominee.

Launching his campaign, Avalanche defended a platform centered on lower taxation, free enterprise, public security, and reducing the size of the federal government.

== Legal issues ==
=== Criminal charges concerning the PRTB leadership election ===
In January 2026, the São Paulo Public Prosecutor's Office (Ministério Público de São Paulo, MPSP) charged Avalanche and six other individuals with offenses allegedly committed during the PRTB's internal leadership election in February 2024.

According to prosecutors, the group used forged identification documents and false information to influence the party's internal election and subsequently manipulated party and electoral records to consolidate control over the organization.

The indictment also accused Avalanche of criminal association, electoral fraud, inserting false information into public databases, and other related offenses.

Avalanche denied all allegations. His legal defense stated that the internal election complied with Brazilian electoral law and the party's bylaws and argued that the prosecution's accusations were unfounded.

As of July 2026, the criminal proceedings remained pending and no final judgment had been issued.

=== Allegations of political gender violence ===
The same indictment accused Avalanche of committing acts of political gender violence against Rachel Carvalho, then the PRTB's national vice president.

According to prosecutors, Avalanche allegedly threatened, intimidated and harassed Carvalho in an effort to prevent her from exercising her party functions. The prosecution also alleged that members of the group fraudulently transferred Carvalho's party registration to another political party through Brazil's electoral system, resulting in the automatic cancellation of her PRTB membership.

Avalanche denied the allegations through his legal defense.

=== Alleged links to the PCC ===
In 2024, Avalanche's name appeared in media reports concerning a police investigation involving individuals allegedly connected to the criminal organization Primeiro Comando da Capital (PCC).

Later that year, Folha de S.Paulo published an audio recording purportedly featuring Avalanche claiming involvement in the release of alleged drug trafficker André do Rap.

Avalanche denied any connection with the PCC and stated that the recording had been fabricated or generated using artificial intelligence.

== Political positions ==
Avalanche has described himself as a conservative and has advocated lower taxes, deregulation, free enterprise, public security, and reducing the size of the federal government.

== Electoral history ==
Year	Election	Party	Office	Votes	%	Result
2026	Presidential	PRTB	President	—	—	TBD
