= BR-262 (Brazil highway) =

Highway of Brazil

BR-262

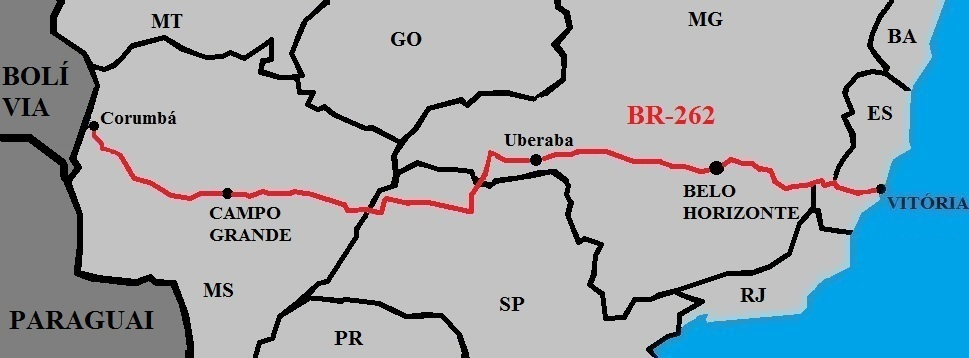

Route information
- Length: 2,295.4 km (1,426.3 mi)

Major junctions
- East end: Vitória, Espírito Santo
- West end: Corumbá, Mato Grosso do Sul

Location
- Country: Brazil

Highway system
- Highways in Brazil; Federal

BR-262 is an east-west highway connecting the Brazilian states of Espírito Santo, Minas Gerais, São Paulo and Mato Grosso do Sul.

The highway runs from the Vitória state capital of Espírito Santo to the Bolivian border at Corumbá, Mato Grosso do Sul.

== Duplications ==
The 84 km stretch from Betim (MG) to Nova Serrana (MG) was upgraded into a dual carriageway in 2011.

The 180 km stretch between Viana (ES) and the border with Minas Gerais will be granted in 2020, and the duplication should occur by 2040. The stretch between Viana and the Victor Hugo district, in Marechal Floriano, must be duplicated by 2028.

== Economy ==
The highway is important for products from Brazilian agriculture, livestock, mining and industry. In the future, it will also act in conjunction with the Bioceanic Corridor, which connects Campo Grande-MS with the ports of northern Chile. At the other end, it reaches the coast of Espírito Santo. As some examples, the production of coffee from Minas Gerais, as well as iron ore from Minas Gerais to Espírito Santo, and soybeans and other grains and beef from Mato Grosso do Sul, all are largely transported by this highway.

== Tourism ==
The highway is of great tourist importance, especially for Espírito Santo, which receives a large flow of people from Minas Gerais to the beaches of Espírito Santo.

In Mato Grosso do Sul, the road that runs along the Pantanal is also an important tourist route. Together with the bi-oceanic corridor that will link Brazil with Paraguay, northern Argentina and northern Chile, the BR -262 will serve as a link to several tourist destinations: the entrance of the Andes Mountains, in Jujuy, Argentina; the Atacama Desert, in Chile (which connects the most flooded area on the planet, the Pantanal, with the driest area on the planet); and even to the beaches of the Northeast.

== Gallery ==
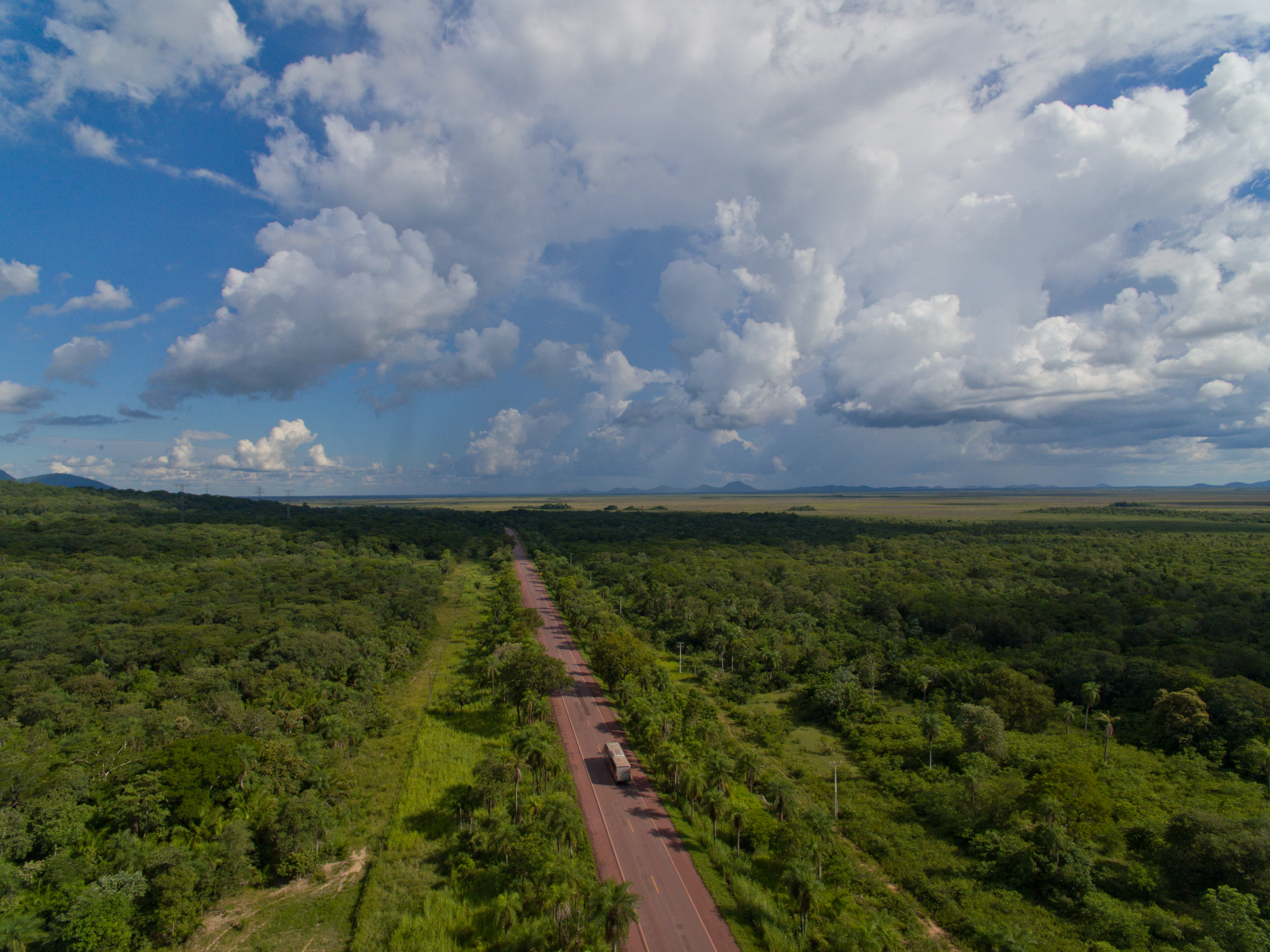
BR-262, about 50 km from Corumbá, Mato Grosso do Sul

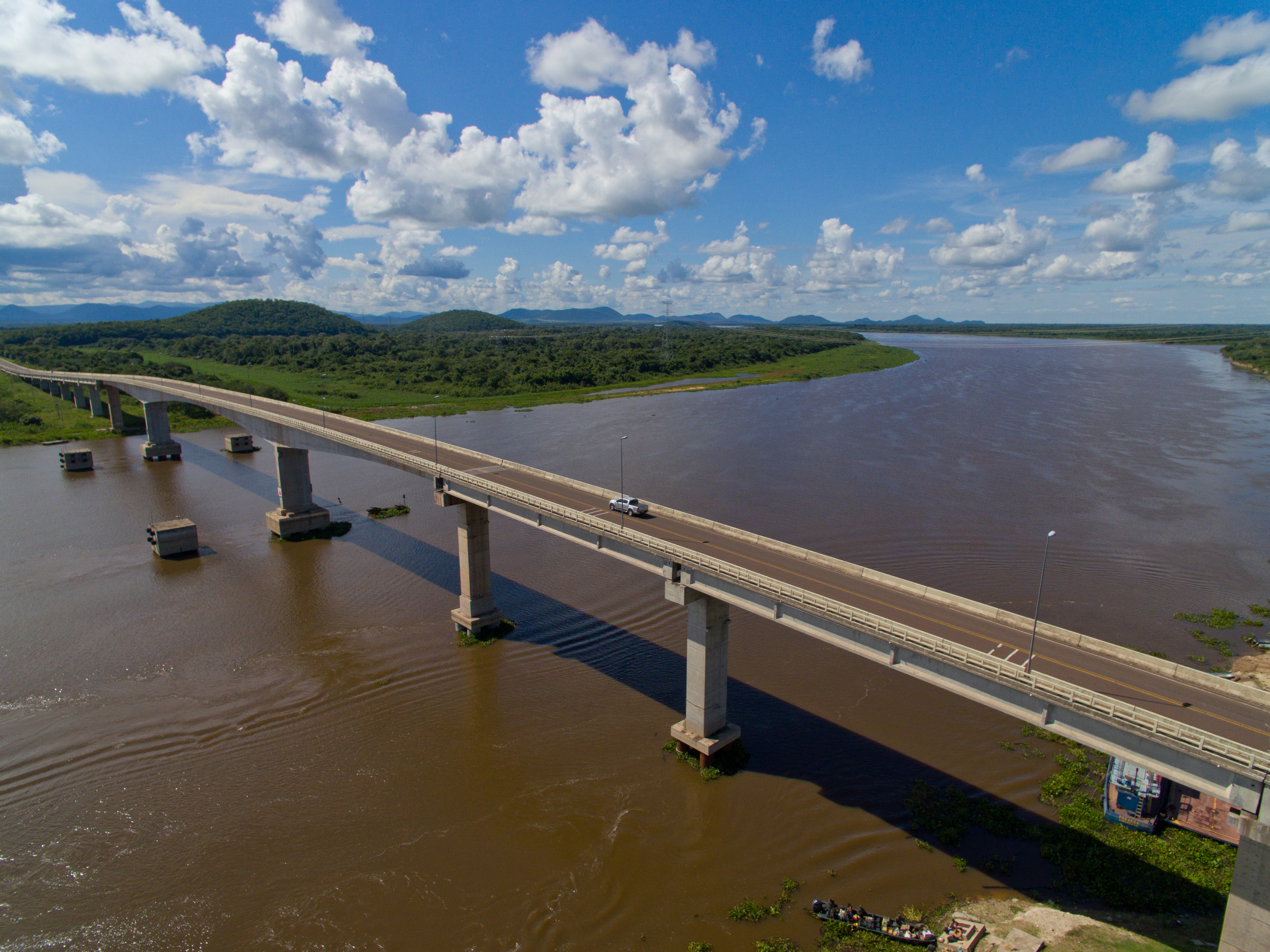
Poet Manoel de Barros bridge, in Corumbá, Mato Grosso do Sul

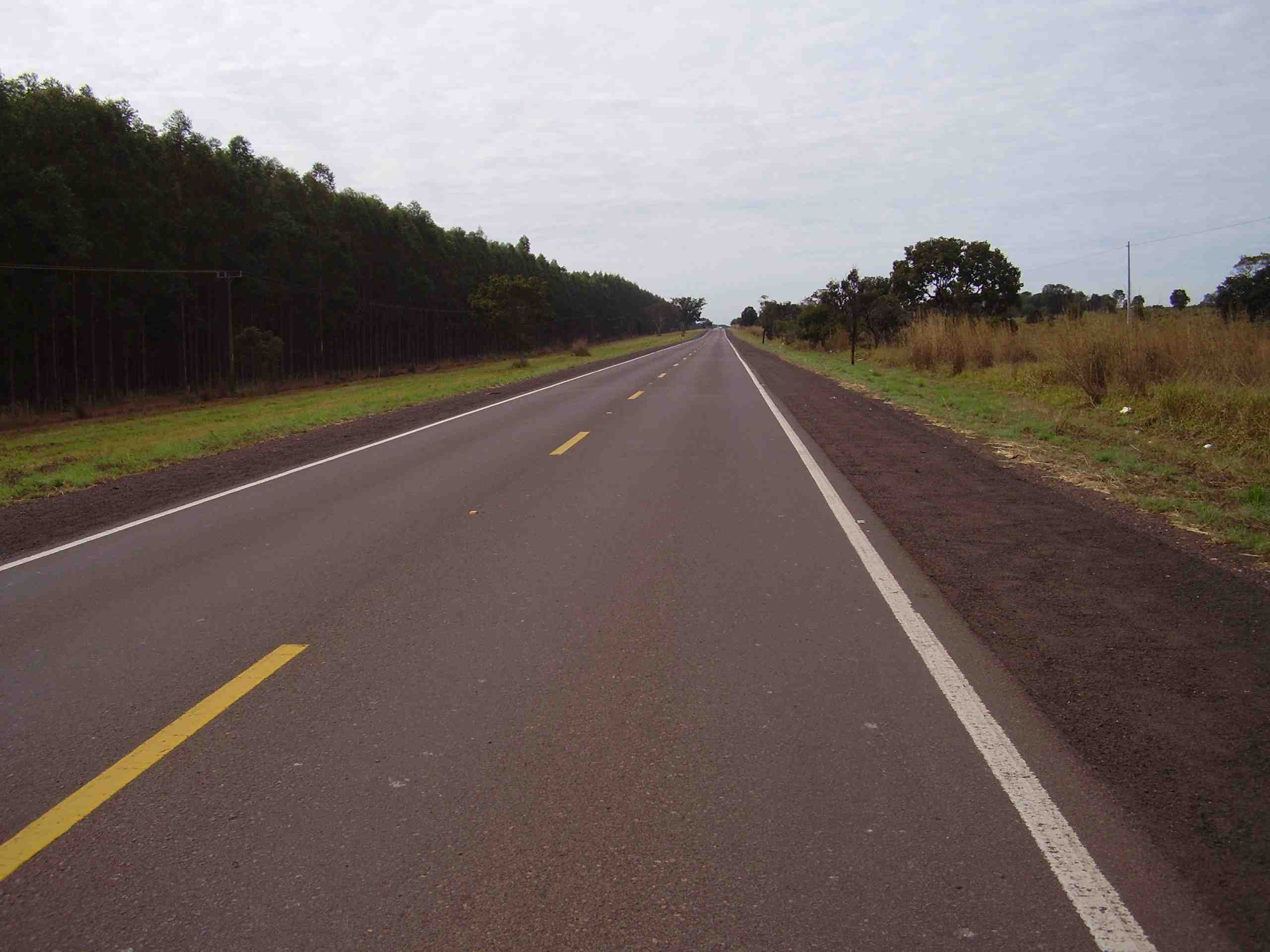
BR-262 in Mato Grosso do Sul

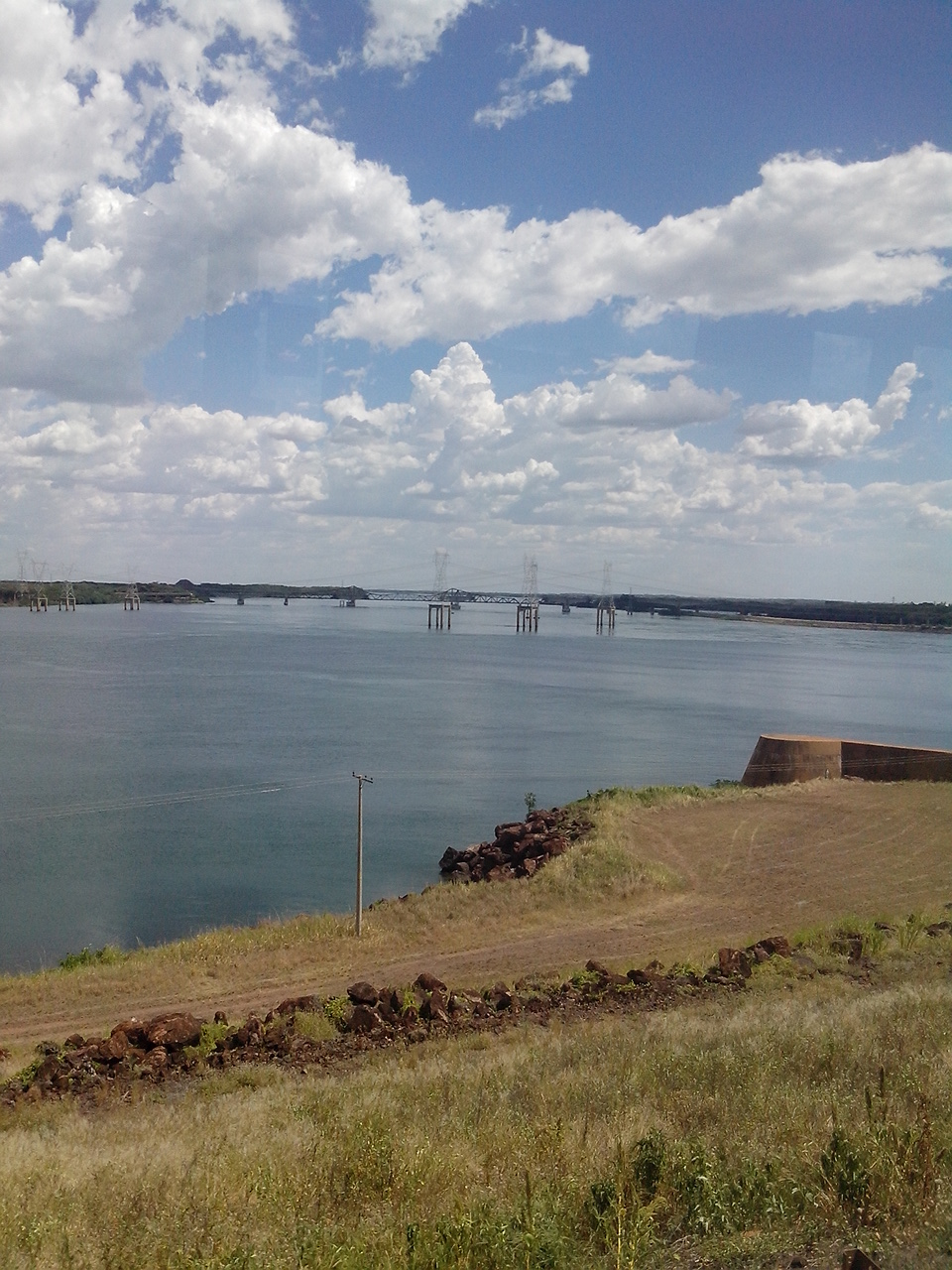
Bridge of BR-262 in Castilho, São Paulo

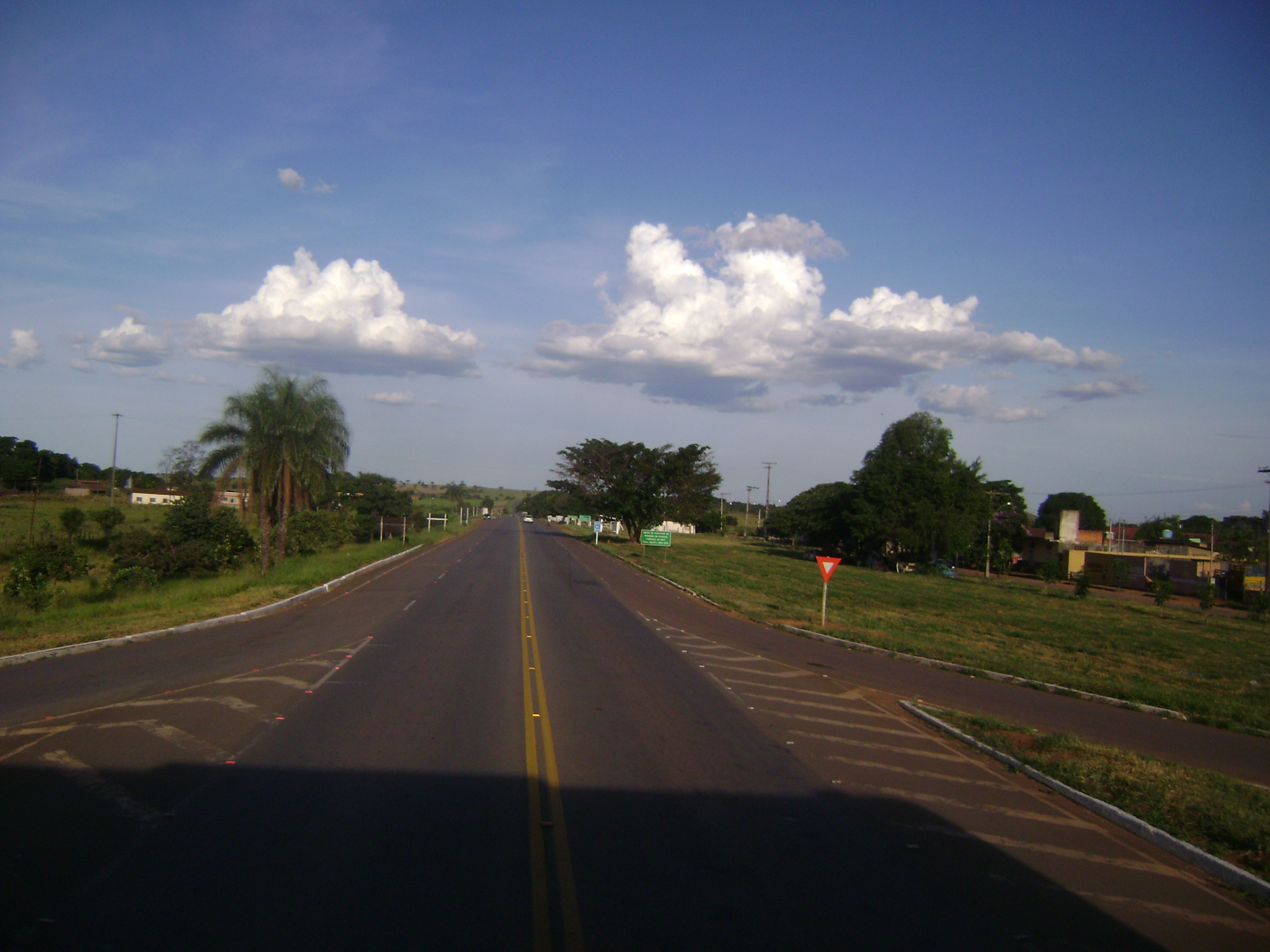
BR-262 in Luz, Minas Gerais

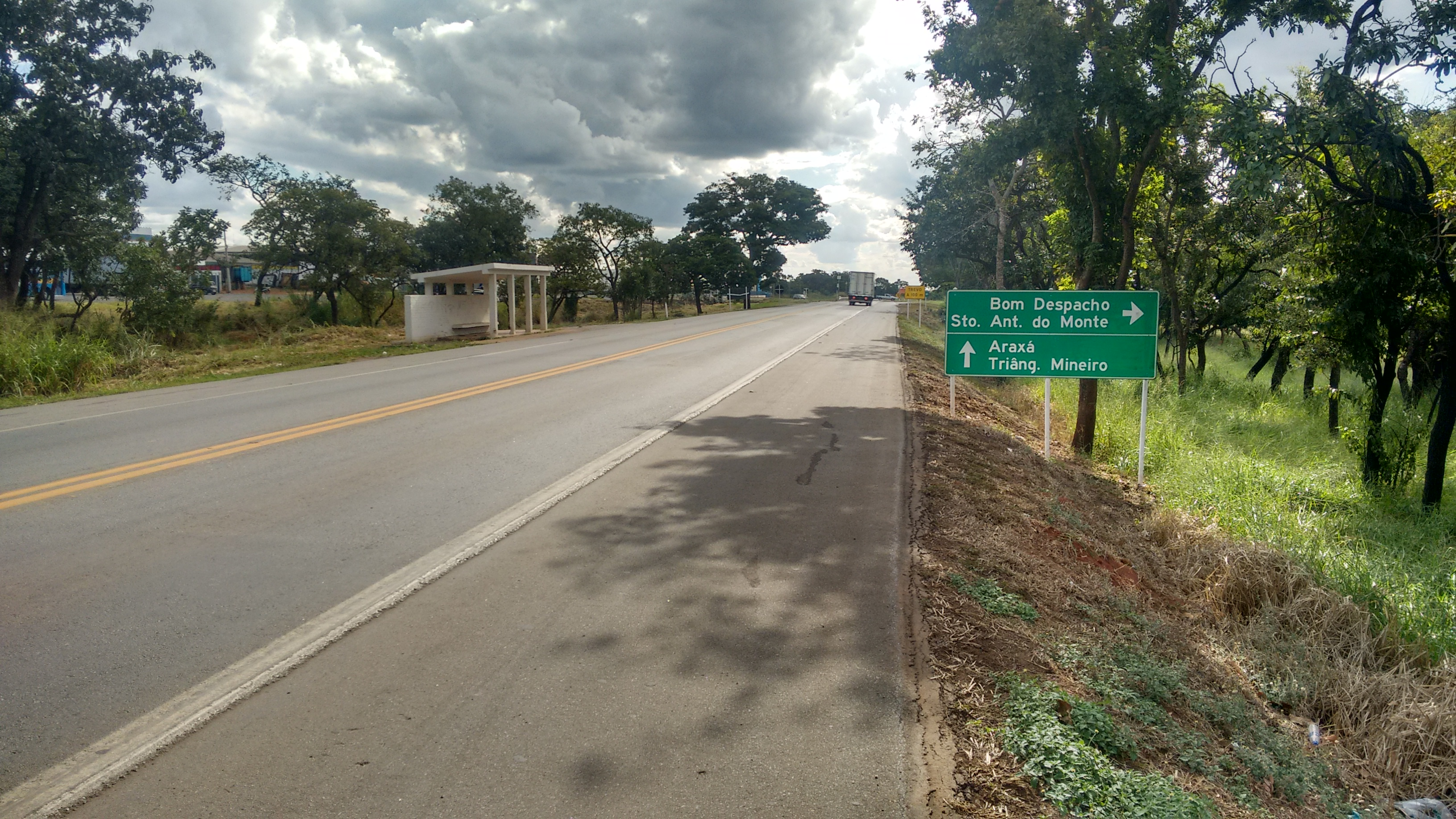
BR-262 near Bom Despacho, Minas Gerais

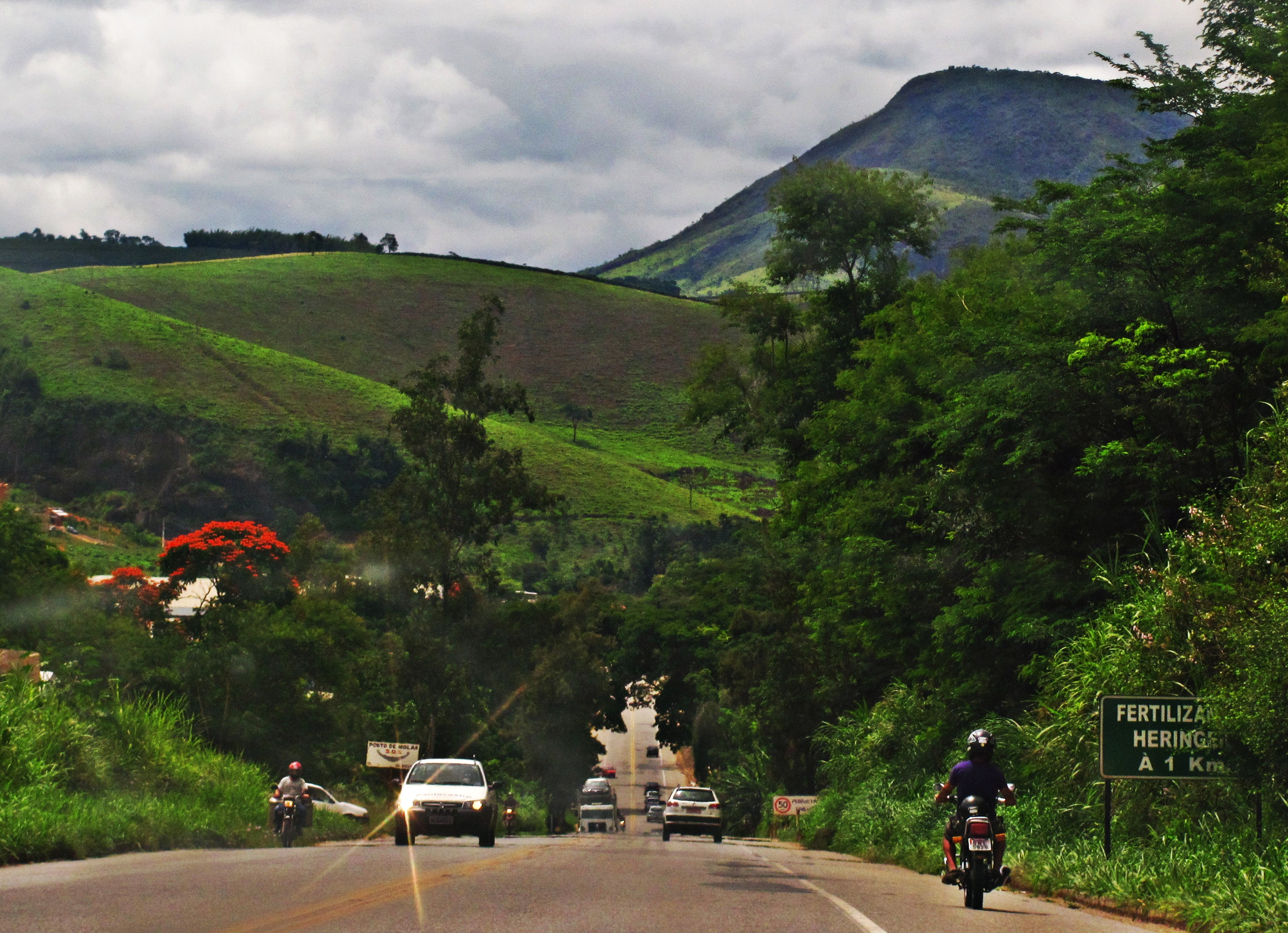
BR-262 in Manhuaçu, Minas Gerais

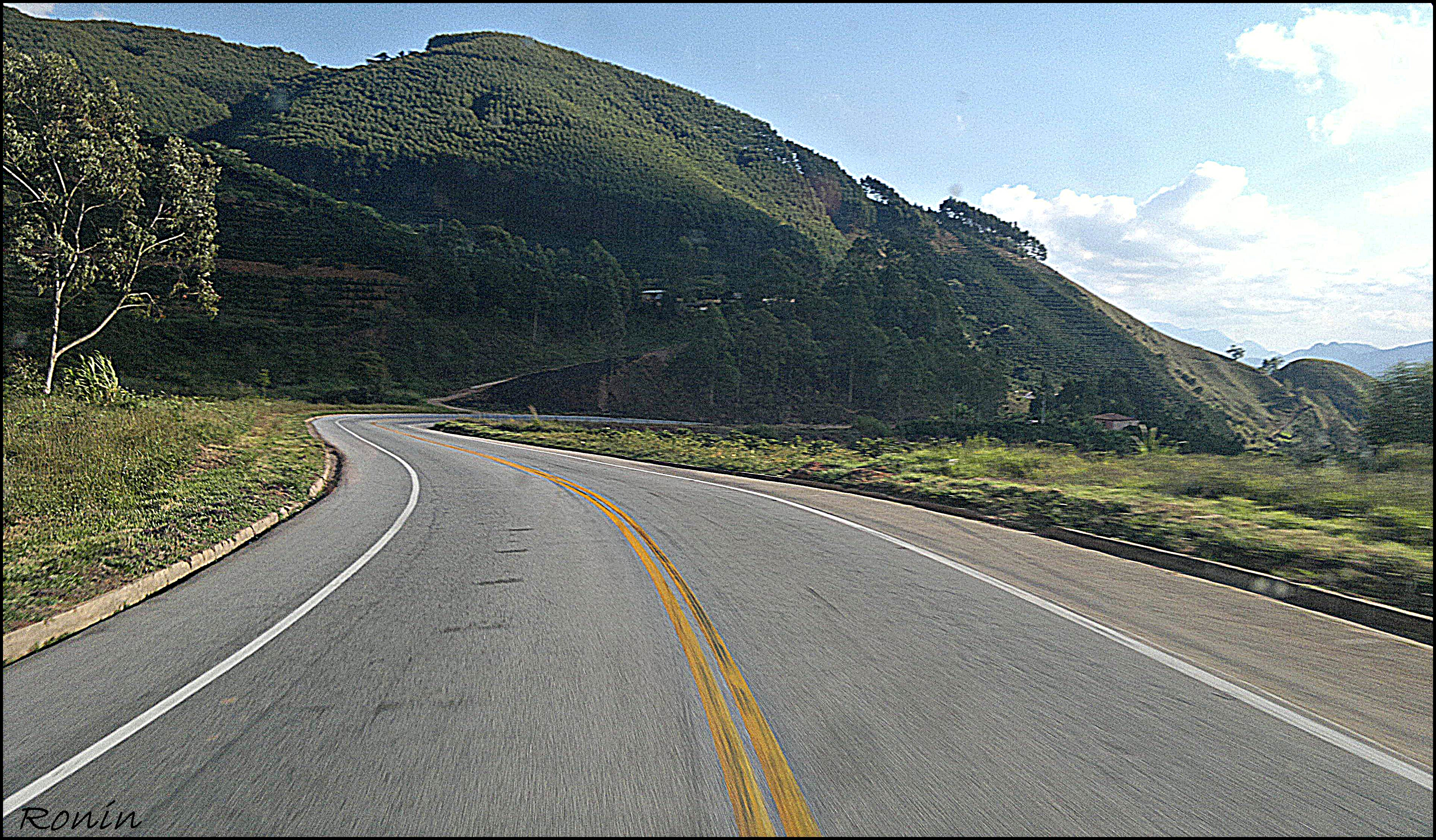
BR-262 in Ibatiba, Espírito Santo

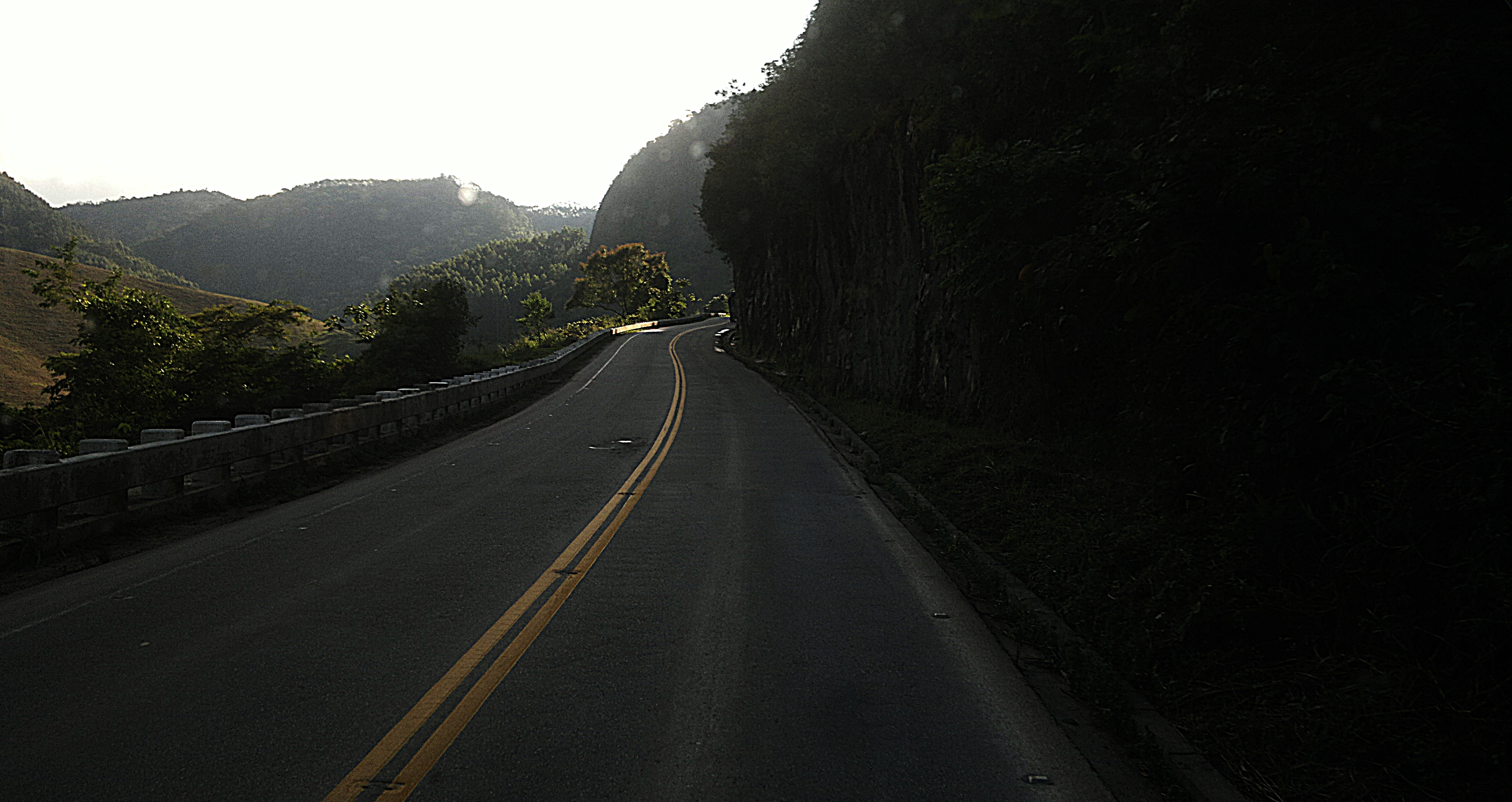
BR-262 in Conceição do Castelo, Espírito Santo
