= Lincoln Portela =

Brazilian politician (born 1953)

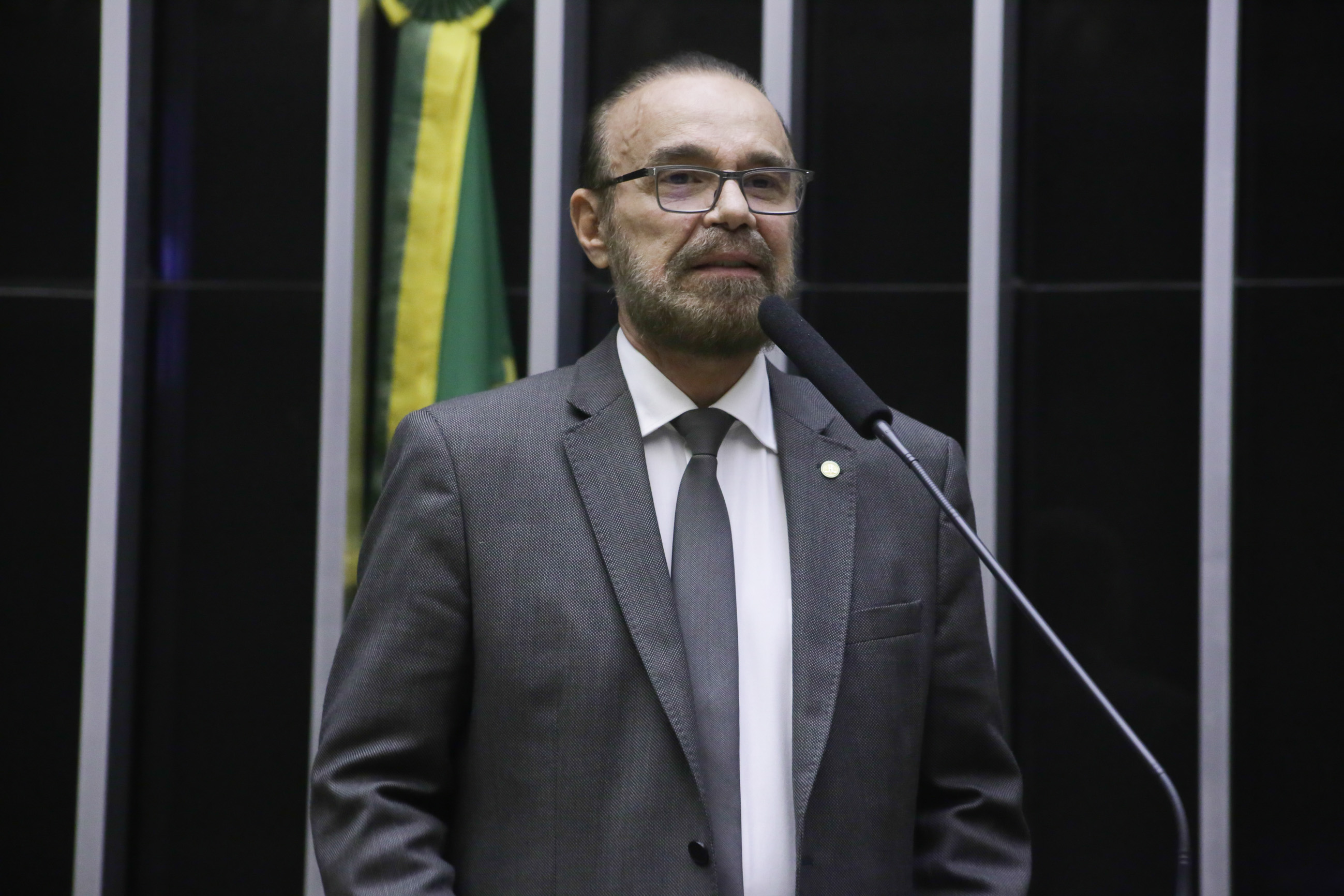

Member of the Chamber of Deputies
- Incumbent
- Assumed office 1 January 1999
- Constituency: Minas Gerais

First Vice President of the Chamber of Deputies
- In office 25 May 2022 – 1 February 2023
- Preceded by: Marcelo Ramos
- Succeeded by: Marcos Pereira

Personal details
- Born: Lincoln Dinz Portela; 3 November 1953 (age 72) Belo Horizonte, Minas Gerais, Brazil
- Party: PL (since 2018)
- Other political affiliations: PST (1993–2000); PSL (2000–2003); PL (2003–2006); PR (2006–2016); PRB (2016–2018)
- Occupation: Radio host and evangelical pastor

Lincoln Dinz Portela (born 3 November 1953) is a Brazilian politician, television and radio personality as well as an evangelical pastor. He has spent his political career representing Minas Gerais, having served as state representative since 1999.

== Personal life ==
Portela worked for three years on the Record TV Network from 1996 to 1998 appearing on the program Record News. As a radio broadcaster he has run the "Espaço Aberto" program on 88.7 FM broadcast in Belo Horizonte. In addition Portela is an evangelical pastor of the Solidarity Baptist Church (Igreja Batista Solidária).

== Political career ==
During his early political career Portela was affiliated with and/or received endorsements from the PST, PSL, and PL; in 2007 Portela formally joined the Brazilian Republican Party or PRB.

Although homeschooling has been prohibited in Brazil since the 1990s, in 2013 Portela proposed a bill that would legalize homeschooling if parents followed educational guidelines approved by the state. The bill was ultimately rejected, with Brazilian Supreme Court ruling for the second time that homeschooling was illegal in 2018.

Portela voted in favor of the impeachment against then-president Dilma Rousseff. Portela voted against the Brazil labor reform (2017), and would later vote for a corruption investigation in Rousseff's successor Michel Temer.

Political offices
Preceded by Marcelo Ramos	First Vice President of the Chamber of Deputies; 2022–2023	Succeeded by Marcos Pereira
