= Renovator Labour Party =

Renewal Labour Party Partido Trabalhista Renovador
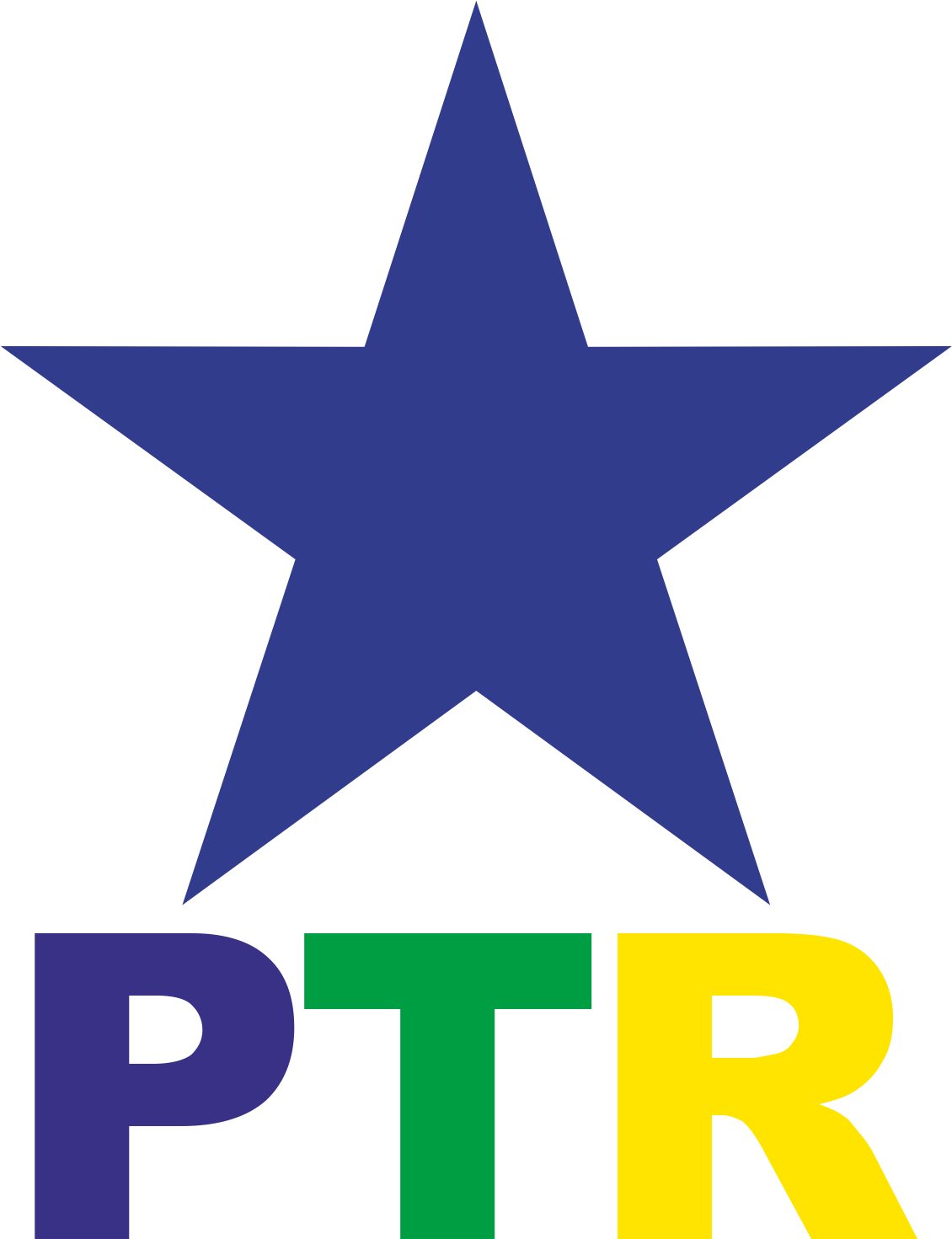
- Abbreviation: PTR
- Founder: Iran Pereira da Silva
- Founded: July 1985
- Registered: March 22, 1990
- Dissolved: February 2, 1993
- Merged into: Progressive Party
- Succeeded by: Brazilian Labour Renewal Party (dissidents)
- Ideology: Labourism
- Political position: Centre-left
- Colours: Blue; Green; Yellow
- TSE Identification Number: 28

The Renewal Labour Party (Portuguese: Partido Trabalhista Renovador, PTR) was a Brazilian political party founded under a provisory registration in July 1985.

Under the presidency of its founder, Iran Pereira da Silva, the PTR was a centre-left party. It defended the adoption of an emergency program to "generate new productive centers and work fronts," the implementation of a housing policy aimed at the working class, the creation of a Ministry of Defense, the suspension of foreign debt payments for a minimum period of five years, among other points.

In 1986, the PTR supported the victorious candidacy of Moreira Franco for the government of the state of Rio de Janeiro. In the same year, it participated in the elections for the National Constituent Assembly, but failed to elect any representative. However, the party hosted the constituent deputy from Rio de Janeiro, Messias Soares, for a few months.

In the 1989 presidential election, the party formally supported the candidacy of the former governor of Alagoas, Fernando Collor de Mello, joining a colligation with the National Reconstruction Party (PRN), the Social Labour Party (PST), and the Social Christian Party (PSC).

In the 1990 elections, the party elected two governors: Osvaldo Piana Filho, in Rondônia, and Joaquim Roriz, in the Federal District. It also elected two federal deputies: Paulo Cardoso de Almeida and Benedito Domingos, who integrated the governing coalition in the National Congress. On March 22, 1990, it received a definitive registration from the Superior Electoral Court (TSE).

In the first semester of 1992, the Collor government was seriously shaken by accusations of corruption, which resulted in the opening of an impeachment process against the president. The party attempted to dissociate itself from Collor's image, although investigations pointed to evidence of involvement of some party leaders in the corruption scheme set up within the government.

== Fusion ==
In October 1992, the PTR and the PST officially formed a parliamentary bloc in the Congress, the first step towards the merger of the two parties. On February 2, 1993, the fusion took place, creating the Progressive Party (PP), nationally presided by the former governor of Paraná, Alvaro Dias.

Some dissidents followed Levy Fidelix to found the Brazilian Labour Renewal Party in 1994.
