= 1990 Brazilian legislative election =

- 3 October 1990
- Chamber of Deputies
- 503 seats in the Chamber of Deputies
Party	Leader	Vote %	Seats	+/–
PMDB		19.26	108	−152
PFL	Jorge Bornhausen	12.41	83	−35
PT	Lula da Silva	10.19	35	+19
PDT	Leonel Brizola	10.04	46	+22
PDS	Paulo Maluf	8.91	42	+9
PSDB	Franco Montoro	8.68	38	New
PRN	Daniel Tourinho	8.29	40	New
PTB		5.62	38	+21
PL	Alvaro Valle	4.25	16	+10
PDC		2.98	22	+17
PSB		1.87	11	+10
PTR		1.05	2	New
PCB		0.96	3	0
PST		0.92	2	New
PCdoB		0.87	5	+2
PSC		0.84	6	+5
PMN		0.62	1	+1
PRS		0.60	4	New
PSD		0.53	1	New
This lists parties that won seats. See the complete results below.
- Senate
- 32 seats in the Senate
Party	Leader	Seats
MDB		8
PFL	Jorge Bornhausen	8
PTB		4
PRN	Daniel Tourinho	2
PDC		2
PDS		2
PT	Lula da Silva	1
PDT	Leonel Brizola	1
PSDB		1
PL	Alvaro Valle	1
PST		1
Independents	–	1
This lists parties that won seats. See the complete results below.

Legislative elections were held in Brazil on 3 October 1990, the first held under the 1988 constitution. The Brazilian Democratic Movement Party emerged as the largest party, winning 108 of the 502 seats in the Chamber of Deputies and 8 of the 31 seats in the Senate. Allies of President Fernando Collor de Mello, elected the previous year, won a majority in both houses of Congress. However in September 1992, Collor's presidency came to an abrupt end when he resigned in a failed attempt to avoid impeachment on corruption charges.

== Results ==
=== Chamber of Deputies ===
Party	Votes	%	Seats	+/–
Brazilian Democratic Movement Party	7,798,653	19.26	108	–152
Liberal Front Party	5,026,474	12.41	83	–35
Workers' Party	4,128,052	10.19	35	+19
Democratic Labour Party	4,068,078	10.04	46	+22
Democratic Social Party	3,609,196	8.91	42	+9
Brazilian Social Democracy Party	3,515,809	8.68	38	New
National Reconstruction Party	3,357,091	8.29	40	New
Brazilian Labour Party	2,277,882	5.62	38	+21
Liberal Party	1,721,929	4.25	16	+10
Christian Democratic Party	1,205,506	2.98	22	+17
Brazilian Socialist Party	756,034	1.87	11	+10
Renovator Labour Party	426,848	1.05	2	New
Brazilian Communist Party	388,564	0.96	3	0
Social Labour Party	373,986	0.92	2	New
Communist Party of Brazil	352,049	0.87	5	+2
Social Christian Party	342,079	0.84	6	+5
Party of National Mobilization	249,606	0.62	1	+1
Social Reforms Party	243,231	0.60	4	New
Social Democratic Party	215,226	0.53	1	New
National Community Party	141,453	0.35	0	0
Progressive Republican Party	94,069	0.23	0	New
Labour Party of Brazil	78,358	0.19	0	New
Social Action Party	42,790	0.11	0	New
Liberating Solidarity Party	27,082	0.07	0	New
Democratic Party	17,102	0.04	0	New
Party of the Reconstruction of the National Order	12,464	0.03	0	New
Humanist Liberal Party	10,076	0.02	0	New
Workers' Nationalist Party	8,395	0.02	0	New
United Socialist Party	3,912	0.01	0	New
Progressive Action Party	3,669	0.01	0	New
Socialist Party	2,274	0.01	0	0
Brazilian Students' Party	638	0.00	0	New
Brazilian Party of Women	194	0.00	0	New
Total	40,498,769	100.00	503	+16
Valid votes	40,498,769	56.29		
Invalid/blank votes	31,442,144	43.71		
Total votes	71,940,913	100.00		
Registered voters/turnout	83,820,558	85.83		
Source: Nohlen, Marchetti Ferraz Júnior

=== Senate ===
Party	Seats
Brazilian Democratic Movement Party	8
Liberal Front Party	8
Brazilian Labour Party	4
National Reconstruction Party	2
Christian Democratic Party	2
Democratic Social Party	2
Workers' Party	1
Democratic Labour Party	1
Brazilian Social Democracy Party	1
Liberal Party	1
Social Labour Party	1
Independents	1
Total	32
Source: Nohlen
