= Chalé =

Brazilian municipality located in the state of Minas Gerais

Coordinates: 20°2′38″S 41°41′16″W

- Municipality
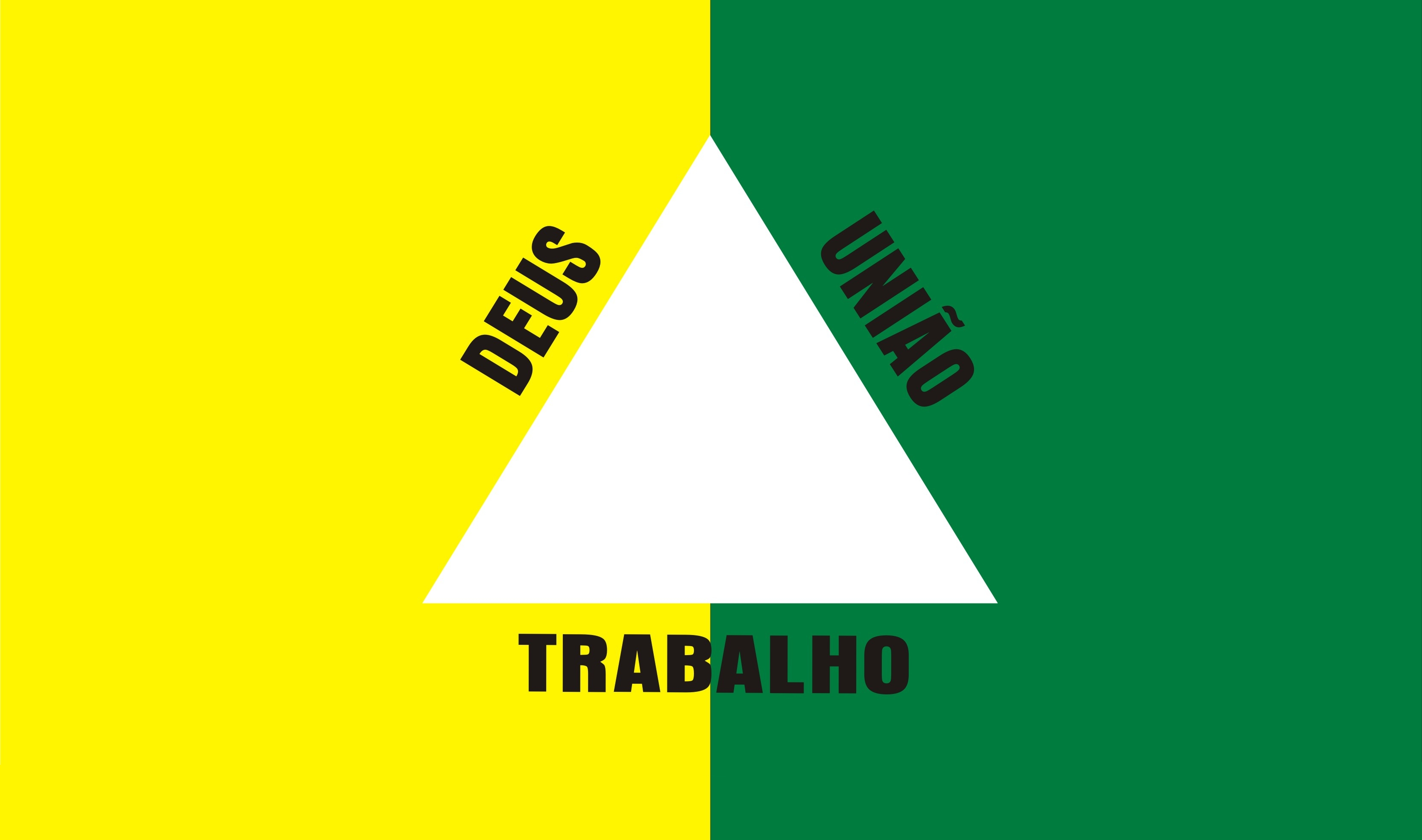
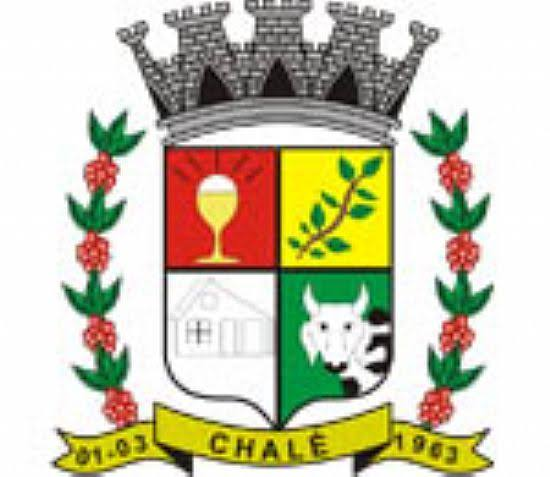
- Flag Coat of arms
- Interactive map of Chalé
- Country: Brazil
- State: Minas Gerais
- Region: Southeast
- Time zone: UTC−3 (BRT)

Location of Chalé within Minas Gerais

Chalé is a Brazilian municipality located in the state of Minas Gerais. The city belongs to the mesoregion of Zona da Mata and to the microregion of Manhuaçu. As of 2020, the estimated population was 5,699.

== See also ==
- List of municipalities in Minas Gerais
