= Vinícius Eutrópio =

Brazilian footballer

Personal information
- Full name: Vinícius Soares Eutrópio
- Date of birth: 27 June 1966 (age 60)
- Place of birth: Mutum, Brazil
- Position: Defensive midfielder

Senior career*
Years	Team	Apps	(Gls)
1984–1989	América Mineiro		
1990	Figueirense		
1991–1992	Catanduvense		
1993–1994	Caxias		
1994	Inter de Limeira		
1995	Novorizontino		
1996	Figueirense		
1996	União São João		
1997	Criciúma		
1998	América Mineiro		
1999	Tubarão		
2000	Náutico		

Managerial career
- 2006: Atlético Paranaense (interim)
- 2007–2009: Fluminense (assistant)
- 2009: Ituano
- 2009: Fluminense (assistant)
- 2009: Fluminense
- 2009–2010: Grêmio Barueri
- 2010: South Africa (assistant)
- 2010–2011: Estoril
- 2012: Grêmio Barueri
- 2012: Duque de Caxias
- 2012–2013: América Mineiro
- 2013: ASA
- 2013–2014: Figueirense
- 2014: Al-Ittihad Kalba
- 2015: Chapecoense
- 2016: Ponte Preta
- 2016: Figueirense
- 2016–2017: Santa Cruz
- 2017: Chapecoense
- 2018: Bolívar
- 2019: Guarani
- 2019: Figueirense
- 2020–2021: Joinville
- 2021: Paysandu
- 2022: Londrina
- 2022–2023: Confiança
- 2023–2024: Tacuary
- 2024–2025: Brunei
- 2025–: A'Ali
- * Club domestic league appearances and goals

Vinícius Soares Eutrópio (born 27 June 1966) is a Brazilian professional football coach and former player who played as a defensive midfielder. He is currently head coach of A'Ali.

== Managerial career ==
After being seven years in Atlético Paranaense's staff, Eutrópio moved to Fluminense as a part of Carlos Alberto Parreira's team. On 13 November 2008, he left the latter, being appointed manager of Ituano.

Eutrópio returned to Flu in March 2009 as Parreira's assistant, being named manager on 13 July. After leaving the club just months later, he was appointed at the helm of Grêmio Barueri on 16 December.

After finishing third in the 2010 Campeonato Paulista, Eutrópio was again appointed Parreira's assistant, now with South Africa. After the year's FIFA World Cup, he joined Estoril, being sacked by the latter on 27 September 2011.

In 2012, Eutrópio returned to Barueri, being relieved from his duties on 4 June. In August, he was appointed at Duque de Caxias, leaving the club in November to manage América Mineiro.

On 19 August 2013, after a brief stint at ASA in March, Eutrópio was appointed Figueirense manager. Despite achieving promotion to Série A at the end of the campaign, and winning 2014 Campeonato Catarinense, he was dismissed on 30 April 2014.

On 2 June 2014, Eutrópio moved to Al-Ittihad Kalba, leaving the club on 20 October. On 11 December, he was appointed at Chapecoense.

This was followed by spells at Ponte Preta and Figueirense, leaving the latter in July 2016. He joined Santa Cruz in December 2016.

Eutrópio returned to Chapecoense on 6 July 2017. He resigned in September 2017.

Eutrópio joined Bolívar in January 2018. He left the club in June 2018 after a poor run of results.

In September 2024, he announced on social media of his appointment as the head coach of the Brunei national football team. Initially signing for three months, he reneged on an extension in February 2025 due to disagreements and lack of respect shown by the football association.

In July 2025, he signed with A'Ali as their new head coach.

== Honours ==
=== Player ===
Criciúma

- Campeonato Catarinense: 1989

Figueirense

- Campeonato Catarinense: 1996
- Copa Santa Catarina: 1996

=== Manager ===
Figueirense

- Campeonato Catarinense: 2014
