= Social Labour Party =

Political party in Brazil

Social Labour Party Partido Social Trabalhista
- Abbreviation: PST
- Founded: 1983 (refounded in 1994)
- Registered: 12 June 1990; 28 August 1996
- Dissolved: 1 April 2003
- Merged into: Progressive Party (1993); Liberal Party (2003)
- Ideology: Labourism
- Political position: Center-left
- Electoral number: 52 (1990–1993); 18 (1994–2003)

The Social Labour Party (Portuguese: Partido Social Trabalhista, PST) was a Brazilian political party. Founded in 1983, with the publication of its manifesto and statute, it received permanent registration in 1990 and, three years later, merged with the Renewal Labour Party (PTR), creating the Progressive Party. The party was recreated in 1994 and contested every election from then until 2003, the year in which it was merged into the Liberal Party.

According to one of its leaders, Dalmo Honaiser, the PST was a centre-right party based on the alliance between medium and small entrepreneurs, liberal professionals and workers. The party's manifesto included support for medium and small businesses, the strengthening of democratic institutions and the progressive taxation of unproductive land as a means of carrying out agrarian reform.

== History ==
The Social Labour Party was founded in 1983, when it first applied for registration with the Superior Electoral Court (TSE) and its manifesto and statute were published. Frustrated by the rejection, the party made a new attempt after the approval of Constitutional Amendment No. 25 in May 1985, which allowed unregistered parties to run candidates in the next municipal elections under provisional registration. However, an internal dispute between two of the party's main leaders, Dalmo Honaiser and Altemir Pessoa Figliuolo, who submitted simultaneous applications to the TSE, made registration impossible.

In January 1989, an application submitted by Honaiser was approved, and the PST was granted provisional registration. That same year, it participated in the coalition supporting the presidential candidate Fernando Collor de Mello, from the National Reconstruction Party, as did the Social Christian Party and the Renewal Labour Party (PTR). From May to June 1990, the PST organized its first national convention and obtained permanent registration from the TSE.

Under the presidency of Marcilio Duarte, the party welcomed some important figures, such as Espírito Santo Senator José Ignacio Ferreira and television presenter Sílvio Santos, whose candidacy for governor of São Paulo was considered but never materialized. Before participating in parliamentary elections, the PST was represented by 20 state deputies and, in the National Congress, by 12 federal deputies and two senators. These numbers were reduced to 15 state deputies and just two federal deputies with the advent of the 1990 election.

In 1991, Marcilio Duarte welcomed former Paraná governor Alvaro Dias, who soon rose to the position of national president. Under his leadership, the party once again received congressmen from other parties. In October 1992, a parliamentary bloc was formed between the PST and the PTR — then chaired by the governor of the Federal District, Joaquim Roriz — which revealed the intention of merging the two parties. This merger was carried out in February 1993, giving rise to the Progressive Party.

The PST was recreated in November 1994, under the leadership of its former president Marcilio Duarte. Permanently registered in 1996, it won nine mayoralties in the that year's municipal elections and had one federal deputy elected in 1998: Lincoln Portela, from Minas Gerais. In 2002, the number of elected congressmen increased to three federal deputies.

However, the approval of a 5% electoral threshold that would be implemented in 2007, vetoed by the Supreme Federal Court in 2006, excluded most of the parties from access to free electoral advertising on radio and television and to public funding, among them the PST. For this reason, the party was merged into the Liberal Party in 2003, together with the Workers' General Party, in order to guarantee the right to these benefits.
