= Progressive Party (Brazil, 1993) =

Progressive Party Partido Progressista
- Abbreviation: PP
- President: Alvaro Dias
- Founded: May 27, 1993
- Dissolved: September 24, 1995
- Preceded by: Social Labour Party; Renewal Labour Party
- Merged into: Brazilian Progressive Party
- Ideology: Conservatism
- Political position: Centre-right

The Progressive Party (Portuguese: Partido Progressista, PP) was a political party in Brazil founded in 1993 by the Social Labour Party and the Reform Labour Party.

In 1995 the party merged with the Reform Progressive Party into Brazilian Progressive Party.

This new party re-changed its name to the Progressive Party in 2003.

Its first national president was Alvaro Dias, former governor and now senator for Podemos in the state of Paraná, having been a candidate for the government of Paraná in 1994, coming in 2nd place, being defeated by Jaime Lerner
