= Levy Fidelix =

Brazilian politician (1951–2021)

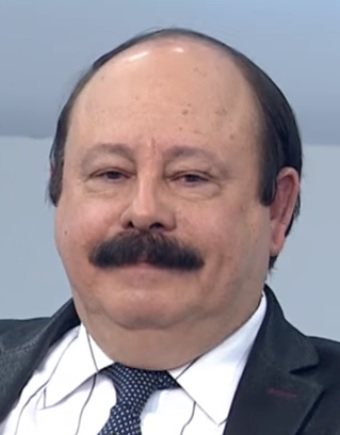
- Fidelix in 2016

PRTB National President
- In office 27 December 1994 – 23 April 2021
- Preceded by: Position established
- Succeeded by: Aldiceia Rodrigues

Personal details
- Born: 27 December 1951 Mutum, Minas Gerais, Brazil
- Died: 23 April 2021 (aged 69) São Paulo, Brazil
- Party: PRTB (1994–2021)
- Other political affiliations: PL (1986–88); PTR (1988–93); PTRB (1993–94)
- Website: www.levyfidelix.com.br

José Levy Fidelix da Cruz (27 December 1951 – 23 April 2021) was a Brazilian conservative politician, businessman, and journalist. He was the founder of the Brazilian Labour Renewal Party (PRTB) and ran for president of Brazil in the elections of 2010 and 2014. He was particularly known in Brazil for his promise of building a bullet train system connecting São Paulo and Rio de Janeiro (the aerotrem) and for his controversial declarations about homosexuals during a political debate in 2014. Also known for being a perennial candidate, he ran for several political posts but never won one. Fidelix died around 20:00 BRT on 23 April 2021 due to COVID-19 complications.

== Biography ==
Fidelix was born in the town of Mutum, Minas Gerais on 27 December 1951 to Jarbas Fidelix, a merchant who worked in the field of transportation, and Lecy Araújo, an educator. He moved to Rio de Janeiro, then the capital of Brazil, and studied communication science at the Fluminense Federal University, but he did not graduate. He later became a journalist and professional advertiser. Fidelix was a Roman Catholic.

At the age of 24, he founded the advertising agency Staff Publicidade and also worked as a design director at Art&Som and Vogue Publicidade. As a journalist, he worked for Correio da Manhã and Última Hora, where he revised the Diário Oficial da União.

Fidelix worked for the government as a communications assistant and created Agricultura Urgente, the first national bulletin of agriculture. Through Agricultura Urgente, he launched Brazil's first ecological campaign, which earned him a presidential medal. He co-founded the business magazine Governo e Empresa and the political magazine O Poder. Around 1976, he was the chief communications officer of Estanave, a company related to Petrobras.

In 1982, he founded Interface, the first Brazilian magazine about informatics. In 1983, he moved to São Paulo, where he worked for two years as an anchorman for TV Informátika, a TV program about informatics, in which he interviewed specialists and politicians.

=== Political career ===
In 1984, Fidelix co-founded the Liberal Party with Álvaro Valle. In 1986, he contested his first political election, running for State Deputy of São Paulo, and received 735 votes.

He later switched to the Renovator Labour Party and contested his second election running for Federal Deputy. He received 541 votes.

In 1989 and 1990, he worked as a communications assistant for Fernando Collor's presidential campaign. In 1994, he founded the Brazilian Labour Renewal Party (PRTB), the party he remained with until his death in 2021, and tried to run for president for the first time but was unable to register. He subsequently ran for Mayor of São Paulo in 1996 (receiving 3,608 votes or 0.068% of the total), Governor of São Paulo in 1998 (receiving 14,406 votes) and 2002 (8,654 votes), Alderman of São Paulo in 2004 (3,382 votes), Federal Deputy in 2006 (5,518 votes), and Mayor of São Paulo in 2008 (receiving 0.09% of the vote).

In 2010, he ran for president of Brazil for the first time and placed seventh (57,960 or 0.06% of the total). He ran for Mayor of São Paulo in 2012 and again for President of Brazil in 2014, supporting the Brazilian military dictatorship. He received 446,878 votes (0.43% of the vote), again finishing seventh; this was the closest Fidelix came during his political career to winning an election.

== Statements about homosexuals ==
On 29 September 2014, during a debate among candidates of the 2014 presidential election hosted by RecordTV, Fidelix stated that homosexuals "need psychological care" and were better kept "well away from [the rest of] us". He also said that Brazil's population of 200 million would be reduced by half if homosexuality were encouraged because "the excretory system" does not function as a means of reproduction. He was asked to apologize but refused, believing that his statements were not offensive.

Fidelix's statements were condemned by opponents like Luciana Genro (PSOL), Marina Silva (PSB), Aécio Neves (PSDB), Dilma Rousseff (PT), who later won the election, as well as organizations such as ABGLT, the Green Party, and even the Ministry of Human Rights. On the other hand, other notable conservative politicians, such as Jair Bolsonaro (PP) and religious personalities, like Silas Malafaia, declared their support for Fidelix.

On 13 March 2015, São Paulo's Court of Justice fined Fidelix with R$1 million for hate speech in his declarations. The court lifted the fine on 3 February 2017 but imposed a revised fine of R$25,000 on 22 February.

== Electoral performance ==
=== Presidential ===
Election	Candidate	First round				Second round			
Election	Candidate	Votes	%	Position	Result	Votes	%	Position	Result
2010		57,960	0.06%	7/9	Lost	—	—	—	—
2014		446,878	0.43%%	▲7/11	Lost	—	—	—	—

Party political offices
New political party	PRTB National President; 1994–2021	Succeeded by Aldiceia Rodrigues
New political party	PRTB nominee for Mayor of São Paulo; 1996, 2008, 2012, 2016, 2020	Most recent
New political party	PRTB nominee for Governor of São Paulo; 1998, 2002	Succeeded by Walter Ciglioni
Preceded by Edson Orloski	PRTB nominee for Vice Mayor of São Paulo; 2000	Succeeded by Marcelo Ayres Duarte
New political party	PRTB nominee for President of Brazil; 2010, 2014	Most recent
