= Ibatiba =

Municipality in Espírito Santo, Brazil

- Municipality
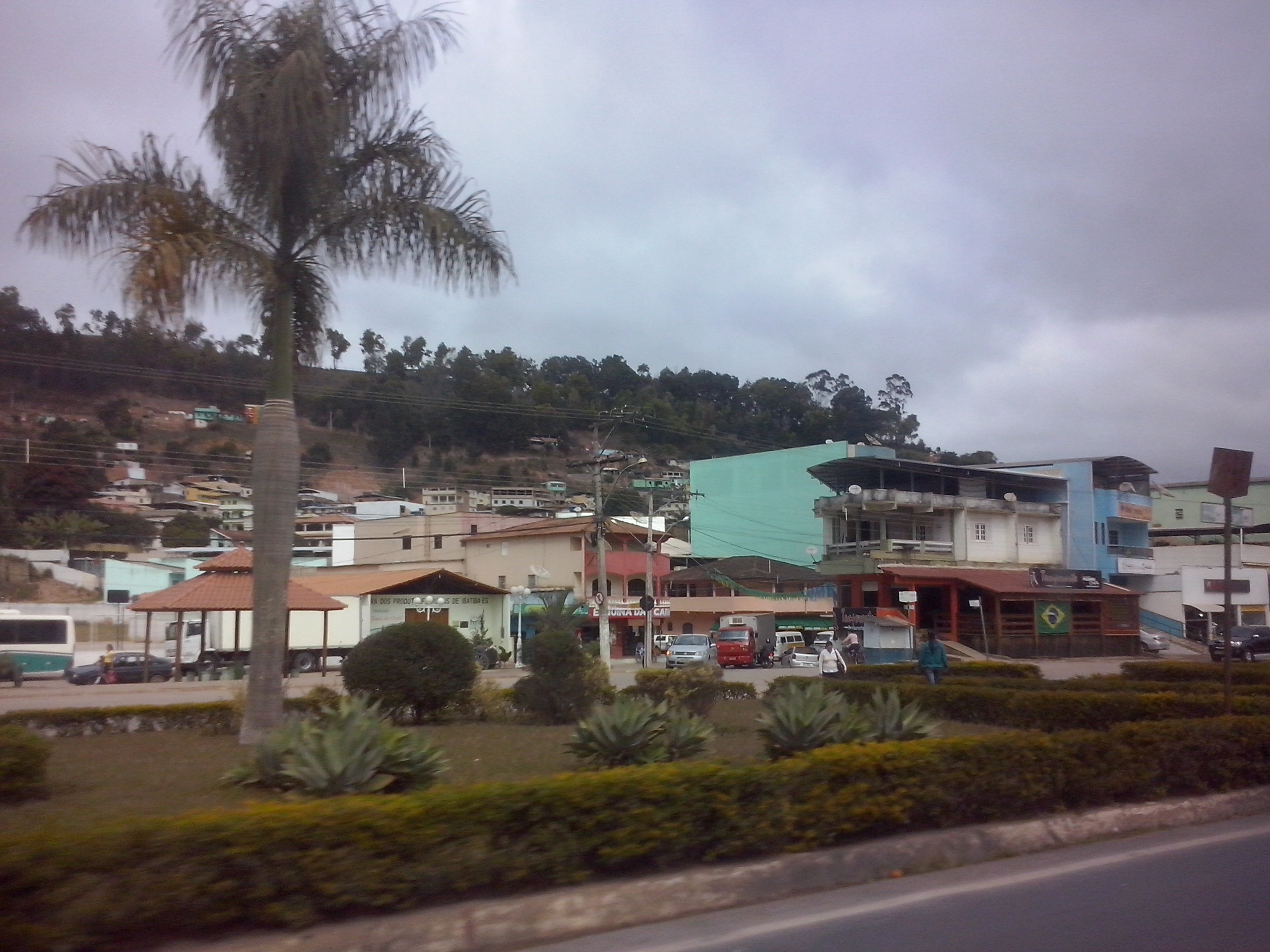

- Flag Coat of arms

- Location in Espírito Santo state

- Location in Brazil
- Coordinates: 20°14′11″S 41°30′33″W
- Country: Brazil
- Region: Southeast
- State: Espírito Santo
- Established: 7 November 1981

Area
  - Total: 241 km^{2} (93 sq mi)

Population (2020)
  - Total: 26,426
  - Density: 110/km^{2} (284/sq mi)
- Time zone: UTC−3 (BRT)

Ibatiba, Espírito Santo is a municipality located in the Brazilian state of Espírito Santo. As of 2020, its population was 26,426. Its area is 241 square kilometres (93 sq mi).
