= Presidential elections in Brazil =

Direct presidential elections are held in Brazil as part of the general elections every four years (which has been regular since 1994), typically in October. The current electoral law provides for a two-round system in which a candidate must receive more than 50% of the vote to win in the first round; if no candidate passes the 50% threshold, a run-off is held between the top two candidates. Every candidate has a running mate who disputes the post of vice-president; prior to 1966, the vice-president was elected separately.

The country has held presidential elections since 1891, spanning over a period of several different republican governments and national constitutions.

== Old Republic ==
Presidentialism was introduced in Brazil after the Proclamation of the Republic in 1889, and the first election was held in 1891. According to the 1891 Constitution, the right to vote was restricted to men over 21 years old who were not illiterate, homeless or enlisted-rank soldiers. The elections for president and vice-president were held separately and the same person could be a candidate for both.

Overall, only a small portion of the population voted. Since coronelism was common, the colonel elites often persuaded people to vote for certain candidates.

=== 1891 ===
The very first president was elected indirectly by the Congress.

Candidate	Votes	%
Deodoro da Fonseca	129	55.60
Prudente de Morais	97	41.81
Floriano Peixoto	3	1.29
Saldanha Marinho	2	0.86
José Higino Duarte Pereira	1	0.43
Total	232	100.00
Valid votes	232	99.15
Invalid/blank votes	2	0.85
Total votes	234	100.00
Registered voters/turnout	268	87.31

=== 1894 ===
From 1894 on, elections were held every four years.

Candidate	Party	Votes	%
Prudente de Morais	Federal Republican	290,889	84.38
Afonso Pena	Mineiro Republican Party	38,291	11.11
Cesário Alvim	Mineiro Republican Party	3,719	1.08
Ruy Barbosa	Paulista Republican Party	3,718	1.08
José Luiz de Almeida Couto		3,137	0.91
Lauro Sodré	Federal Republican	1,876	0.54
Others		3,092	0.90
Total		344,722	100.00
Valid votes		344,722	96.93
Invalid/blank votes		10,903	3.07
Total votes		355,625	100.00
Registered voters/turnout		1,050,000	33.87

=== 1898 ===
Candidate	Party	Votes	%
Campos Sales	Paulista Republican Party	420,286	90.98
Lauro Sodré	Federal Republican	38,929	8.43
Júlio de Castilhos	Rio-Grandense Republican	621	0.13
Others		2,115	0.46
Total		461,951	100.00
Valid votes		461,951	98.34
Invalid/blank votes		7,812	1.66
Total votes		469,763	100.00
Registered voters/turnout		1,168,000	40.22

=== 1902 ===
Candidate	Party	Votes	%
Rodrigues Alves	Paulista Republican Party	592,038	91.69
Quintino Bocaiuva	Conservative Republican	42,542	6.59
Others		11,147	1.73
Total		645,727	100.00
Valid votes		645,727	97.84
Invalid/blank votes		14,273	2.16
Total votes		660,000	100.00
Registered voters/turnout		1,286,000	51.32

=== 1906 ===
Candidate	Party	Votes	%
Afonso Pena	Mineiro Republican Party	288,285	98.27
Lauro Sodré	Federal Republican	4,865	1.66
Ruy Barbosa	Paulista Republican Party	207	0.07
Others			
Total		293,357	100.00
Valid votes		293,357	98.13
Invalid/blank votes		5,599	1.87
Total votes		298,956	100.00
Registered voters/turnout		1,357,000	22.03

=== 1910 ===
Candidate	Party	Votes	%
Hermes da Fonseca	Conservative Republican	403,867	64.35
Ruy Barbosa	Paulista Republican Party	222,822	35.51
Venceslau Brás	Mineiro Republican Party	152	0.02
Others		726	0.12
Total		627,567	100.00
Valid votes		627,567	98.06
Invalid/blank votes		12,433	1.94
Total votes		640,000	100.00
Registered voters/turnout		1,490,000	42.95

=== 1914 ===
Candidate	Party	Votes	%
Venceslau Brás	Mineiro Republican Party	532,107	91.58
Ruy Barbosa	Liberal Republican	47,782	8.22
Pinheiro Machado	Conservative Republican	222	0.04
Others		889	0.15
Total		581,000	100.00
Valid votes		581,000	98.47
Invalid/blank votes		9,000	1.53
Total votes		590,000	100.00
Registered voters/turnout		1,580,000	37.34

=== 1918 ===
Candidate	Party	Votes	%
Rodrigues Alves	Paulista Republican Party	386,467	99.03
Nilo Peçanha	Fluminense Republican	1,768	0.45
Ruy Barbosa	Paulista Republican Party	1,044	0.27
Others		962	0.25
Total		390,241	100.00
Valid votes		390,241	98.80
Invalid/blank votes		4,749	1.20
Total votes		394,990	100.00
Registered voters/turnout		1,726,000	22.88

=== 1919 ===
Since Rodrigues Alves, the President-elect, caught the Spanish flu and died before taking office, a new election was held in 1919.

Candidate	Party	Votes	%
Epitácio Pessoa	Mineiro Republican Party	286,373	70.96
Ruy Barbosa	Paulista Republican Party	116,414	28.85
Altino Arantes	Paulista Republican Party	161	0.04
Others		612	0.15
Total		403,560	100.00
Valid votes		403,560	96.55
Invalid/blank votes		14,440	3.45
Total votes		418,000	100.00
Registered voters/turnout		1,766,000	23.67

=== 1922 ===
Candidate	Party	Votes	%
Artur Bernardes	Mineiro Republican Party	466,972	59.46
Nilo Peçanha	Fluminense Republican	317,714	40.46
Urbano Santos	Mineiro Republican Party	232	0.03
Others		383	0.05
Total		785,301	100.00
Valid votes		785,301	73.67
Invalid/blank votes		280,699	26.33
Total votes		1,066,000	100.00
Registered voters/turnout		1,900,000	56.11

=== 1926 ===
Candidate	Party	Votes	%
Washington Luís	Paulista Republican Party	688,528	99.70
Assis Brasil	Democratic Republican	1,116	0.16
Melo Viana	Mineiro Republican Party	341	0.05
Others		598	0.09
Total		690,583	100.00
Valid votes		690,583	98.37
Invalid/blank votes		11,417	1.63
Total votes		702,000	100.00
Registered voters/turnout		2,210,000	31.76

=== 1930 ===
Candidate	Party	Votes	%
Júlio Prestes	Paulista Republican Party	1,091,709	59.39
Getúlio Vargas	Liberal Alliance	742,794	40.41
Minervino de Oliveira	Workers and Peasants' Bloc	151	0.01
Others		3,550	0.19
Total		1,838,204	100.00
Valid votes		1,838,204	96.74
Invalid/blank votes		61,921	3.26
Total votes		1,900,125	100.00
Registered voters/turnout		2,525,000	75.25

== Vargas Era ==
With the Revolution of 1930, the country was governed until 1930 by a military triumvirate, while Getúlio Vargas was the de facto president (officially President of the Provisional Government). The new Constitution predicted that the first president would be chosen by the Congress in an indirect election.

=== 1934 ===
Candidate	Party	Votes	%
Getúlio Vargas (incumbent)	Independent	175	57.00
Borges de Medeiros	Rio-Grandense Republican	59	19.22
Others		73	23.78
Total		307	100.00

A second election was scheduled for 1938, but it did not happen due to the 1937 coup d'état, under which another Constitution was written.

== Fourth Republic ==
After Vargas was forced to resign in 1945, a new state was born under a democratic constitution written in 1946. The new Constitution provided for direct elections every five years for both president and vice-president.

=== 1945 ===
Candidate	Party	Votes	%
Eurico Gaspar Dutra	PSD	3,251,507	55.39
Eduardo Gomes	UDN	2,039,341	34.74
Yedo Fiúza	PCB	569,818	9.71
Mário Rolim Teles	PAN	10,001	0.17
Total		5,870,667	100.00
Valid votes		5,870,667	97.74
Invalid votes		65,217	1.09
Blank votes		70,328	1.17
Total votes		6,006,212	100.00

=== 1950 ===
Candidate	Party	Votes	%
Getúlio Vargas	PTB	3,879,040	48.93
Eduardo Gomes	UDN	2,342,384	29.55
Cristiano Machado	PSD	1,697,173	21.41
João Mangabeira	PSB	9,466	0.12
Total		7,928,063	100.00
Valid votes		7,928,063	95.68
Invalid votes		146,473	1.77
Blank votes		211,433	2.55
Total votes		8,285,969	100.00

=== 1955 ===
Candidate	Party	Votes	%
Juscelino Kubitschek	PSD	3,077,411	35.68
Juarez Távora	UDN	2,610,462	30.27
Adhemar de Barros	PSP	2,222,725	25.77
Plínio Salgado	PRP	714,379	8.28
Total		8,624,977	100.00
Valid votes		8,624,977	94.81
Invalid votes		310,185	3.41
Blank votes		161,852	1.78
Total votes		9,097,014	100.00

=== 1960 ===
Candidate	Party	Votes	%
Jânio Quadros	PTN	5,636,825	48.26
Teixeira Lott	PSD	3,846,825	32.94
Adhemar de Barros	PSP	2,195,709	18.80
Total		11,679,359	100.00
Valid votes		11,679,359	92.79
Invalid votes		473,806	3.76
Blank votes		433,391	3.44
Total votes		12,586,556	100.00

== Military rule ==
With the 1964 military coup d'état, the direct democracy ended and presidents (who were all members of military, except for the last one) were now elected by the Congress. The interval between elections was irregular.

=== 1964 ===
Candidate	Party	Votes	%
Humberto Castello Branco	Ind.	361	98.63
Juarez Távora	PDC	3	0.82
Eurico Gaspar Dutra	PSD	2	0.55
Total		366	100.00
Valid votes		366	83.56
Invalid/blank votes		72	16.44
Total votes		438	100.00
Registered voters/turnout		475	92.21

=== 1966 ===
With the two-party system, only ARENA and MDB could dispute elections. President and vice-president were now part of the same ticket. The 1966 and 1969 elections had only one candidate.

Candidate	Running mate	Party	Votes	%
Artur da Costa e Silva	Pedro Aleixo	ARENA	294	100.00
Total			294	100.00
Valid votes			294	87.76
Invalid/blank votes			41	12.24
Total votes			335	100.00
Registered voters/turnout			475	70.53

=== 1969 ===
First election under the 1967 Constitution.

Candidate	Running mate	Party	Votes	%
Emílio Garrastazu Médici	Augusto Rademaker	ARENA	293	100.00
Total			293	100.00
Valid votes			293	79.40
Invalid/blank votes			76	20.60
Total votes			369	100.00
Registered voters/turnout			475	77.68

=== 1974 ===
Candidate	Running mate	Party	Votes	%
Ernesto Geisel	Adalberto Pereira dos Santos	ARENA	400	84.03
Ulysses Guimarães	Barbosa Lima Sobrinho	MDB	76	15.97
Total			476	100.00
Valid votes			476	95.77
Invalid/blank votes			21	4.23
Total votes			497	100.00
Registered voters/turnout			503	98.81

=== 1978 ===
Candidate	Running mate	Party	Votes	%
João Figueiredo	Aureliano Chaves	ARENA	355	61.10
Euler Bentes Monteiro	Paulo Brossard	MDB	226	38.90
Total			581	100.00
Valid votes			581	98.14
Invalid/blank votes			11	1.86
Total votes			592	100.00
Registered voters/turnout			592	100.00

=== 1985 ===
The two-party system ended in 1979 and many other parties were created. This was the last election under the military regime.

Candidate	Running mate	Party	Votes	%
Tancredo Neves	José Sarney	PMDB	480	72.73
Paulo Maluf	Flávio Marcílio	PDS	180	27.27
Total			660	100.00
Valid votes			660	96.21
Invalid/blank votes			26	3.79
Total votes			686	100.00
Registered voters/turnout			695	98.71

== New Republic ==
Under the current Constitution enacted in October 1988, elections are held every four years (except for the first one, which was held five years before the second to match the centenary of the Proclamation of the Republic) and citizens elect a ticket for both president and vice-president. Voting is mandatory for men and women between 18 and 70 years old who are not illiterate, and optional for people aged 16–17, over 70, and illiterates.

=== 1989 ===
Candidate	Running mate	Party	First round		Second round	
Candidate	Running mate	Party	Votes	%	Votes	%
Fernando Collor	Itamar Franco	PRN	20,611,030	30.48	35,090,206	53.03
Luiz Inácio Lula da Silva	José Paulo Bisol (PSB)	PT	11,622,321	17.19	31,075,803	46.97
Leonel Brizola	Fernando Lyra	PDT	11,167,665	16.51		
Mário Covas	Almir Gabriel	PSDB	7,790,381	11.52		
Paulo Maluf	Bonifácio de Andrada	PDS	5,986,585	8.85		
Guilherme Afif Domingos	Aluísio Pimenta (PDC)	PL	3,272,520	4.84		
Ulysses Guimarães	Waldir Pires	PMDB	3,204,996	4.74		
Roberto Freire	Sérgio Arouca	PCB	769,117	1.14		
Aureliano Chaves	Cláudio Lembo	PFL	600,821	0.89		
Ronaldo Caiado	Camilo Calazans (PDN)	PSD	488,893	0.72		
Affonso Camargo Neto	Paiva Muniz	PTB	379,284	0.56		
Enéas Carneiro	Lenine Madeira	PRONA	360,578	0.53		
José Alcides de Oliveira	Reinau Valim	PSP	238,408	0.35		
Paulo Gontijo	Luís Paulino	PP	198,710	0.29		
Zamir José Teixeira	William Pereira	PCN	187,164	0.28		
Lívia Maria Pio	Ardwin Grunewald	PN	179,925	0.27		
Eudes Oliveira Mattar	Daniel Lazzeoroni Jr	PLP	162,343	0.24		
Fernando Gabeira	Maurício Lobo Abreu	PV	125,844	0.19		
Celso Brant	Emídio Neto	PMN	109,903	0.16		
Antônio Pedreira	José Fortunato	PPB	86,107	0.13		
Manoel Horta	Jorge Coelho de Sá	PDCdoB	83,291	0.12		
Armando Corrêa	Agostinho Linhares	PMB	0	0.00		
Total			67,625,886	100.00	66,166,009	100.00
Valid votes			67,625,886	93.55	66,166,009	94.17
Invalid votes			3,487,963	4.82	3,108,232	4.42
Blank votes			1,176,367	1.63	986,460	1.40
Total votes			72,290,216	100.00	70,260,701	100.00
Registered voters/turnout			82,074,718	88.08	82,074,718	85.61

=== 1994 ===
Candidate	Running mate	Party	Votes	%
Fernando Henrique Cardoso	Marco Maciel (PFL)	PSDB	34,314,961	54.24
Luiz Inácio Lula da Silva	Aloizio Mercadante	PT	17,122,127	27.07
Enéas Carneiro	Roberto Gama	PRONA	4,671,457	7.38
Orestes Quércia	Iris de Araújo	PMDB	2,772,121	4.38
Leonel Brizola	Darcy Ribeiro	PDT	2,015,836	3.19
Esperidião Amin	Gardênia Gonçalves	PPR	1,739,894	2.75
Carlos Antônio Gomes	Dilton Salomoni	PRN	387,738	0.61
Hernani Fortuna	Vítor Nósseis	PSC	238,197	0.38
Total			63,262,331	100.00
Valid votes			63,262,331	81.21
Invalid votes			7,444,017	9.56
Blank votes			7,192,116	9.23
Total votes			77,898,464	100.00
Registered voters/turnout			94,732,410	82.23

=== 1998 ===
Candidate	Running mate	Party	Votes	%
Fernando Henrique Cardoso (incumbent)	Marco Maciel (PFL)	PSDB	35,936,540	53.06
Luiz Inácio Lula da Silva	Leonel Brizola (PDT)	PT	21,475,218	31.71
Ciro Gomes	Roberto Freire	PPS	7,426,170	10.97
Enéas Carneiro	Irapuan Teixeira	PRONA	1,447,090	2.14
Ivan Frota	João Ferreira da Silva	PMN	251,337	0.37
Alfredo Sirkis	Carla Rabello	PV	212,984	0.31
José Maria de Almeida	José Galvão de Lima	PSTU	202,659	0.30
João de Deus	Nanci Pilar	PTdoB	198,916	0.29
José Maria Eymael	Jormar Alderete	PSDC	171,831	0.25
Thereza Ruiz	Eduardo Gomes	PTN	166,138	0.25
Sérgio Bueno	Ronald Azaro	PSC	124,659	0.18
Vasco Azevedo Neto	Alexandre José dos Santos	PSN	109,003	0.16
Total			67,722,545	100.00
Valid votes			67,722,545	81.30
Invalid votes			8,886,895	10.67
Blank votes			6,688,403	8.03
Total votes			83,297,843	100.00
Registered voters/turnout			106,101,067	78.51

=== 2002 ===
Candidate	Running mate	Party	First round		Second round	
Candidate	Running mate	Party	Votes	%	Votes	%
Luiz Inácio Lula da Silva	José Alencar (PL)	PT	39,455,233	46.44	52,793,364	61.27
José Serra	Rita Camata (PMDB)	PSDB	19,705,445	23.20	33,370,739	38.73
Anthony Garotinho	José Antônio Almeida	PSB	15,180,097	17.87		
Ciro Gomes	Paulo Pereira da Silva	PPS	10,170,882	11.97		
José Maria de Almeida	Dayse Oliveira	PSTU	402,236	0.47		
Rui Costa Pimenta	Pedro Paulo de Abreu	PCO	38,619	0.05		
Total			84,952,512	100.00	86,164,103	100.00
Valid votes			84,952,512	89.61	86,164,103	94.00
Invalid votes			6,976,107	7.36	3,772,138	4.12
Blank votes			2,873,720	3.03	1,727,760	1.88
Total votes			94,802,339	100.00	91,664,001	100.00
Registered voters/turnout			115,254,113	82.26	115,254,113	79.53

=== 2006 ===
Candidate	Running mate	Party	First round		Second round	
Candidate	Running mate	Party	Votes	%	Votes	%
Luiz Inácio Lula da Silva (incumbent)	José Alencar (PRB)	PT	46,662,365	48.61	58,298,042	60.83
Geraldo Alckmin	José Jorge (PFL)	PSDB	39,968,369	41.64	37,543,178	39.17
Heloísa Helena	César Benjamin	PSOL	6,575,393	6.85		
Cristovam Buarque	Jefferson Peres	PDT	2,538,844	2.64		
Ana Maria Rangel	Delma Gama e Narcini	PRP	126,404	0.13		
José Maria Eymael	José Paulo Neto	PSDC	63,294	0.07		
Luciano Bivar	Américo de Souza	PSL	62,064	0.06		
Total			95,996,733	100.00	95,841,220	100.00
Valid votes			95,996,733	91.58	95,841,220	93.96
Invalid votes			5,957,521	5.68	4,808,553	4.71
Blank votes			2,866,205	2.73	1,351,448	1.32
Total votes			104,820,459	100.00	102,001,221	100.00
Registered voters/turnout			125,913,134	83.25	125,913,134	81.01

=== 2010 ===
Candidate	Running mate	Party	First round		Second round	
Candidate	Running mate	Party	Votes	%	Votes	%
Dilma Rousseff	Michel Temer (PMDB)	PT	47,651,434	46.91	55,752,529	56.05
José Serra	Indio da Costa (DEM)	PSDB	33,132,283	32.61	43,711,388	43.95
Marina Silva	Guilherme Leal	PV	19,636,359	19.33		
Plínio de Arruda Sampaio	Hamilton Assis	PSOL	886,816	0.87		
José Maria Eymael	José Paulo Neto	PSDC	89,350	0.09		
José Maria de Almeida	Cláudia Durans	PSTU	84,609	0.08		
Levy Fidelix	Luiz Eduardo Duarte	PRTB	57,960	0.06		
Ivan Pinheiro	Edmilson Costa	PCB	39,136	0.04		
Rui Costa Pimenta	Edson Dorta	PCO	12,206	0.01		
Total			101,590,153	100.00	99,463,917	100.00
Valid votes			101,590,153	91.36	99,463,917	93.30
Invalid votes			6,124,254	5.51	4,689,428	4.40
Blank votes			3,479,340	3.13	2,452,597	2.30
Total votes			111,193,747	100.00	106,605,942	100.00
Registered voters/turnout			135,804,433	81.88	135,804,433	78.50

=== 2014 ===
Candidate	Running mate	Party	First round		Second round	
Candidate	Running mate	Party	Votes	%	Votes	%
Dilma Rousseff (incumbent)	Michel Temer (PMDB)	PT	43,267,668	41.59	54,501,118	51.64
Aécio Neves	Aloysio Nunes	PSDB	34,897,211	33.55	51,041,155	48.36
Marina Silva	Beto Albuquerque	PSB	22,176,619	21.32		
Luciana Genro	Jorge Paz	PSOL	1,612,186	1.55		
Everaldo Pereira	Leonardo Gadelha	PSC	780,513	0.75		
Eduardo Jorge	Célia Sacramento	PV	630,099	0.61		
Levy Fidelix	José Alves de Oliveira	PRTB	446,878	0.43		
José Maria de Almeida	Cláudia Durans	PSTU	91,209	0.09		
José Maria Eymael	Roberto Lopes	PSDC	61,250	0.06		
Mauro Iasi	Sofia Manzano	PCB	47,845	0.05		
Rui Costa Pimenta	Ricardo Machado	PCO	12,324	0.01		
Total			104,023,802	100.00	105,542,273	100.00
Valid votes			104,023,802	90.36	105,542,273	93.66
Invalid votes			6,678,580	5.80	5,219,787	4.63
Blank votes			4,420,488	3.84	1,921,819	1.71
Total votes			115,122,870	100.00	112,683,879	100.00
Registered voters/turnout			142,822,046	80.61	142,822,046	78.90

=== 2018 ===
Candidate	Running mate	Party	First round		Second round	
Candidate	Running mate	Party	Votes	%	Votes	%
Jair Bolsonaro	Hamilton Mourão (PRTB)	PSL	49,276,990	46.03	57,797,847	55.13
Fernando Haddad	Manuela d'Ávila (PCdoB)	PT	31,342,051	29.28	47,040,906	44.87
Ciro Gomes	Kátia Abreu	PDT	13,344,371	12.47		
Geraldo Alckmin	Ana Amélia Lemos (PP)	PSDB	5,096,350	4.76		
João Amoêdo	Christian Lohbauer	NOVO	2,679,745	2.50		
Cabo Daciolo	Suelene Balduino	Patriota	1,348,323	1.26		
Henrique Meirelles	Germano Rigotto	MDB	1,288,950	1.20		
Marina Silva	Eduardo Jorge (PV)	REDE	1,069,578	1.00		
Alvaro Dias	Paulo Rabello (PSC)	PODE	859,601	0.80		
Guilherme Boulos	Sônia Guajajara	PSOL	617,122	0.58		
Vera Lúcia Salgado	Hertz Dias	PSTU	55,762	0.05		
José Maria Eymael	Helvio Costa	DC	41,710	0.04		
João Goulart Filho	Léo Alves	PPL	30,176	0.03		
Total			107,050,729	100.00	104,838,753	100.00
Valid votes			107,050,729	91.21	104,838,753	90.43
Invalid votes			7,206,222	6.14	8,608,105	7.43
Blank votes			3,106,937	2.65	2,486,593	2.14
Total votes			117,363,888	100.00	115,933,451	100.00
Registered voters/turnout			147,306,295	79.67	147,306,294	78.70

=== 2022 ===
In the second round, Lula received 50.90% of the votes to Bolsonaro's 49.10%, the closest presidential election result in Brazil to date.

Candidate	Running mate	Party	First round		Second round	
Candidate	Running mate	Party	Votes	%	Votes	%
Luiz Inácio Lula da Silva	Geraldo Alckmin (PSB)	PT	57,259,504	48.43	60,345,999	50.90
Jair Bolsonaro (incumbent)	Walter Braga Netto	PL	51,072,345	43.20	58,206,354	49.10
Simone Tebet	Mara Gabrilli (PSDB)	MDB	4,915,423	4.16		
Ciro Gomes	Ana Paula Matos	PDT	3,599,287	3.04		
Soraya Thronicke	Marcos Cintra	UNIÃO	600,955	0.51		
Luiz Felipe d'Avila	Tiago Mitraud	NOVO	559,708	0.47		
Kelmon Souza	Luiz Cláudio Gamonal	PTB	81,129	0.07		
Leonardo Péricles	Samara Martins	UP	53,519	0.05		
Sofia Manzano	Antônio Alves	PCB	45,620	0.04		
Vera Lúcia Salgado	Kunã Yporã Tremembé	PSTU	25,625	0.02		
José Maria Eymael	Professor Bravo	DC	16,604	0.01		
Total			118,229,719	100.00	118,552,353	100.00
Valid votes			118,229,719	95.59	118,552,353	95.41
Invalid votes			3,487,874	2.82	3,930,765	3.16
Blank votes			1,964,779	1.59	1,769,678	1.42
Total votes			123,682,372	100.00	124,252,796	100.00
Registered voters/turnout			156,453,354	79.05	156,453,354	79.42

=== 2026 ===
Candidate	Running mate	Party	First round		Second round	
Candidate	Running mate	Party	Votes	%	Votes	%
Luiz Inácio Lula da Silva	Geraldo Alckmin (PSB)	Workers' Party	53,879,538	45.16	64,256,232	51.79
Flávio Bolsonaro	Alfredo Gaspar	Liberal Party	56,104,503	47.03	59,826,041	48.21
Augusto Cury	Júlio Delgado	Avante	3,448,569	2.89		
Renan Santos	Aroldo Medina	Mission Party	2,675,887	2.24		
Ronaldo Caiado	Gilberto Kassab	Social Democratic Party	2,605,148	2.18		
Romeu Zema	Eduardo Girão	New Party	326,488	0.27		
Samara Martins	Raquel Brício	Popular Unity	122,911	0.10		
Hertz Dias	Vanessa Portugal	United Socialist Workers' Party	43,103	0.04		
Clariana Barão	Fabiana Torquato	Christian Democracy	40,043	0.03		
Edmilson Costa	Cleusa Santos	Brazilian Communist Party	22,693	0.02		
Wilson Grassi	Suêd Haidar	Democrata	16,881	0.01		
Rui Costa Pimenta	Antônio Carlos	Workers' Cause Party	15,024	0.01		
Total			119,300,788	100.00	124,082,273	100.00
Valid votes			119,300,788	95.23	124,082,273	96.76
Invalid votes			3,674,249	2.93	2,723,305	2.12
Blank votes			2,300,798	1.84	1,430,496	1.12
Total votes			125,275,835	100.00	128,236,074	100.00
Registered voters/turnout			158,745,502	78.92	158,745,502	80.78
