= 1989 Brazilian presidential election =

- 15 November 1989 (first round); 17 December 1989 (second round)
- Turnout: 88.08% (first round); 85.61% (second round)
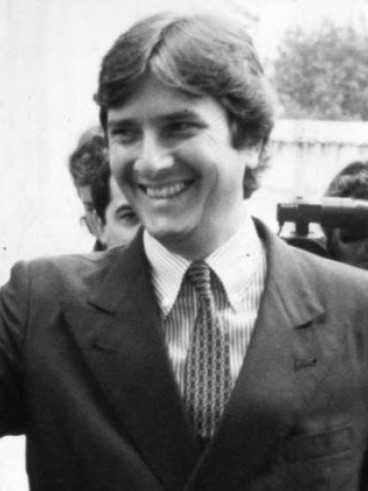

Candidate	Fernando Collor	Lula da Silva
Party	PRN	PT
Alliance	New Brazil	Popular Brazil Front
Running mate	Itamar Franco	José Paulo Bisol (PSB)
Popular vote	35,090,206	31,075,803
Percentage	53.03%	46.97%
President before election
José Sarney
MDB
Elected President
Fernando Collor
PRN

Presidential elections were held in Brazil in 1989, with the first round on November 15 and a second round on December 17. They were the first direct presidential elections since 1960, the first to be held using a two-round system and the first to take place under the 1988 constitution, which followed two decades of authoritarian rule after the 1964 Brazilian coup d'état.

The collapse of the military-imposed two-party system that pitted the right-wing authoritarian National Renewal Alliance (ARENA) against the catch-all Brazilian Democratic Movement (MDB) resulted in a wide array of new parties seeking to fill the political vacuum. President José Sarney of the PMDB, the MDB's successor, was ineligible to run. Sarney, who was elected Vice President on Tancredo Neves's ticket in the 1985 elections, had taken office due to Neves's death before his scheduled inauguration.

Popular Governor of Alagoas Fernando Collor de Mello resigned from his position to mount a bid for the presidency. Previously a member of the PMDB, Collor joined the small National Reconstruction Party (PRN) in the run-up to the presidential campaign. Collor, who presented himself as a political outsider and was noted for his charisma, polled at a mere 5% according to polling taken in early 1989. Collor's emergence as an unlikely frontrunner was credited to his campaign's skilled use of television advertisements to make the case for his candidacy. Collor, who had governed one of the smallest states in the country, chose Senator Itamar Franco of the populous and electorally crucial state of Minas Gerais as his running mate. Further, Collor's campaign was noted for his relative youth at the mere age of 40.

Following the end of state repression of socialist parties, the Brazilian Left faced a fractured field defined by two primary candidates: Popular labour leader Luiz Inácio Lula da Silva, known as Lula, of the industrial ABC Region of São Paulo, and Leonel Brizola, a longtime staple of the Brazilian Left who had served as Governor of Rio Grande do Sul prior to the 1964 military coup. Lula was widely known in Brazil for his role leading the highly publicized metalworkers' strike in the State of São Paulo during the late 1970s and had been elected a federal deputy in 1986 with the most votes nationwide. Lula ran as a member of the Workers' Party (PT), a left-wing party he helped found in 1980. For his running mate, Lula chose Senator José Paulo Bisol of Rio Grande do Sul, a member of the Brazilian Socialist Party (PSB), to unite the left. In the first round, Lula narrowly defeated Brizola, who was running as a member of the Democratic Labour Party (PDT), for a position in the runoff.

The general election was marked by negative campaigning, with Collor accusing Lula of supporting divisive class struggle. The role of Rede Globo, the largest and most-watched TV network in Brazil, in Collor's election remains controversial. Following a tumultuous election cycle, Collor defeated Lula to become the first directly elected President of Brazil in almost thirty years. Collor would later resign from office facing an impending impeachment trial.

== Background ==
On January 15, 1985, following two decades of a US-backed right-wing military dictatorship, in power since the 1964 Brazilian coup d'état, Tancredo Neves of the Brazilian Democratic Movement, the opposition party in a military junta-imposed two-party system, was indirectly elected president by Congress. The government was an authoritarian illiberal democracy which directly elected representatives, but not the president. It was in a process of slow liberalization since the 1974 indirect election of Ernesto Geisel, who was more permissive of political dissent than his hard-liner predecessor, Emílio Garrastazu Médici. Neves was the first civilian to be elected president since 1960.

However, Neves was hospitalized of an untreated cancer on the eve of his inauguration, and finally died in 21 April, before taking office. José Sarney, the Vice-president-elect, was immediately sworn in. The legitimacy of Sarney's appointment was widely questioned, since Neves had died as president-elect without ever taking office. Sarney was seen with suspicion by the civilian population as a member of the military regime's party, the National Renewal Alliance. The support of General Leônidas Pires Gonçalves, slated to be Minister of the Army in Neves' future cabinet, was decisive for Sarney taking office.

Nevertheless, as promised by Neves, Sarney led a transitional government which allowed for liberalization of the authoritarian military government. In 1986, he called for elections to form a constituent assembly, which designed and promulgated the seventh and current constitution of Brazil on October 5, 1988. A markedly liberal democratic and social democratic constitution, it prescribed first-past-the-post two-round direct elections for executive and legislative seats at the federal, state, and municipal levels, and set the date for the 1989 election. It also provided for freedom of expression and legalized formerly clandestine parties such as the Brazilian Communist Party and the Brazilian Socialist Party.

== Candidates ==
=== Candidates in the runoff ===
Party	Presidential candidate	Running mate (Note: Same party as the presidential candidate, unless mentioned in parentheses)	Coalition
National Reconstruction Party	Fernando Collor Governor of Alagoas (1987–1989)	Itamar Franco Senator from Minas Gerais	New Brazil: National Reconstruction Party; Renewal Labour Party; Social Christian Party; Social Labour Party
Workers' Party	Lula da Silva Federal Deputy	José Paulo Bisol (PSB) Senator from Rio Grande do Sul	Popular Brazil Front: Workers' Party; Brazilian Socialist Party; Communist Party of Brazil

=== Candidates not advanced to runoff ===
Party	Presidential candidate	Running mate	Coalition
Brazilian Communist Party	Roberto Freire Federal Deputy	Sérgio Arouca President of Fiocruz (1985–1989)	—N/a
Brazilian Labour Party	Affonso Camargo Netto Senator from Paraná	José Roberto Faria Lima	—N/a
Brazilian Municipalist Party	Armando Corrêa President of the party	Agostinho Linhares	—N/a
Brazilian People's Party	Antônio Pedreira President of the party	Orestes Ferreira Alves	—N/a
Brazilian Social Democracy Party	Mário Covas Senator from São Paulo	Almir Gabriel Senator from Pará	—N/a
Democratic Labour Party	Leonel Brizola Governor of Rio de Janeiro (1983–1987)	Fernando Lyra Federal Deputy	—N/a
Democratic Social Party	Paulo Maluf Governor of São Paulo (1979–1982)	Bonifácio de Andrada Federal Deputy	—N/a
Green Party	Fernando Gabeira	Maurício Lobo Abreu	—N/a
Liberal Party	Guilherme Afif Federal Deputy	Aluísio Pimenta (PDC)	Christian Liberal Alliance: Liberal Party; Christian Democratic Party
National Communitarian Party	Zamir José Teixeira	William Pereira da Silva President of the party	—N/a
Nationalist Party	Lívia Maria Pio	Ardwin Retto Grünewald	—N/a
National Mobilization Party	Celso Brant President of the party	José Natan	—N/a
Brazilian Democratic Movement Party	Ulysses Guimarães Federal Deputy	Waldir Pires Governor of Bahia (1987–1989)	—N/a
Christian Democracy Party of Brazil	Manoel Horta	Jorge Coelho de Sá	—N/a
Liberal Front Party	Aureliano Chaves Minister of Mines and Energy (1985–1988)	Cláudio Lembo Secretary of Legal Affairs of São Paulo (1986–1989)	—N/a
Party of the Reconstruction of the National Order	Enéas Carneiro President of the party	Lenine Madeira	—N/a
People's Party	Paulo Gontijo President of the party	Luiz Paulino	—N/a
Progressive Liberal Party	Eudes Mattar	Dante Lazzaroni Júnior	—N/a
Social Democratic Party	Ronaldo Caiado Leader of the Ruralist Democratic Union	Camillo Calazans (PDN)	City-Country Union: Social Democratic Party; National Democratic Party
Social Progressive Party	Marronzinho President of the party	Reinaldo Valim	—N/a

== Campaign ==
Most political parties were relatively new but managed to actively mobilise the population, with the election coming five years after massive demonstrations for direct elections in the late 1980s Diretas Já movement had called for the end of the military regime. Sarney was barred by the 1988 constitution from running for immediate reelection as a vice president ascending to the office of president counts as a full term.

Twenty-two candidates entered the race, a record number of candidates in a single presidential election. The 1989 elections were the first in which the president and vice-president were jointly elected as running mates.

Among the twenty-two candidates, only Ulysses Guimarães and Paulo Maluf had previously run for the presidency, although Jânio Quadros planned to run but eventually dropped his candidacy. Aureliano Chaves had also previously served as vice-president. Orestes Quercia, a member of Sarney's Brazilian Democratic Movement, led the polls until he decided to drop out of the contest. TV host Silvio Santos announced he would run just 20 days before the election, but his candidacy was mired in uncertainty and eventually revoked by the Superior Electoral Court because of a technicality.

The first round took place on November 15, 1989, the 100th anniversary of the republican coup which deposed Pedro II of Brazil and proclaimed the First Brazilian Republic. Since no candidate managed to win a majority of votes, a second round was held on December 17, featuring the two top finishers: Fernando Collor de Mello of the economically liberal right-wing populist National Reconstruction Party and Luiz Inácio Lula da Silva of the social democratic left-wing populist Workers' Party.

Both candidates had a reputation as outsiders. Despite being a charismatic leader, Lula failed to attract the majority of votes from poor, unskilled and semiskilled workers – who would, later on, form the basis of the Workers' Party electorate. These voters predominantly favored Collor, who was associated with the traditional economic elites of northeastern Brazil. Lula's support was greater among progressive intellectuals, Catholic activists, skilled industrial workers, and the college-educated middle class of the South and Southeast, despite himself being a poor immigrant from the Northeast.

Collor argued that Lula's plans of aggressive spending on inequality reduction programs would destroy Brazil's then-fragile economy, harming the poor people he claimed to champion. He also appealed to his young age and distanced himself from the previous military governments, as well as from the newer political elites who had supported the Sarney government and its Plano Cruzado, which had failed to stop hyperinflation.

After Leonel Brizola was defeated in the first round, he supported Lula, with his support being considered crucial to Lula's strong performance in Rio Grande do Sul in the second round.

Ultimately, Collor was elected with a six-point lead. His initial widespread support, based on his strong rhetoric against corruption, quickly vanished in the wake of his 1992 impeachment for corruption charges, leading to Collor resigning from office in an unsuccessful attempt to stop the proceedings. Lula would go on to be elected president for the first time in the 2002 elections, win a second term in the 2006 contest and be elected president for the second time in the 2022 elections. The Workers' Party also won the presidency twice more with Dilma Rousseff, a protégé of Lula, in the 2010 and 2014 elections. The party would remain in power until her impeachment in 2016 and the 2018 election of right-wing populist Jair Bolsonaro.

== Debates ==
=== First round ===
Following the first round, Rede Globo aired a debate between Lula and Collor live. During the broadcast of primetime news program Jornal Nacional on the following day, an edited-down highlight reel of the debate was aired. Critics argued that it highlighted Collor's best moments and Lula's worst ones, and that coverage was sympathetical to Collor, who was supposedly close to Globo's CEO Roberto Marinho. The event was explored on the British Channel 4 documentary Beyond Citizen Kane, which features an interview with then head of journalism at Globo, Armando Nogueira, where he says his edit of the debate was edited so as to favor Collor and claims that after complaining to Marinho about the edit, he was dismissed from the company.

Some attribute Collor's electoral victory to this particular event and other media coverage, such as a Jornal do Brasil article claiming Lula had fathered an illegitimate daughter. Later, Collor's campaign contacted Lula's ex-girlfriend, the mother of the child in question, and claimed that Lula had asked her to perform an abortion. This is said to be compounded by a prohibition on electoral advertising immediately preceding an election, which prevented Lula from responding to the accusations.

The kidnapping of wealthy businessman Abilio Diniz on the day of the election by alleged supporters of PT is believed to have harmed Lula, who was legally forbidden from speaking to the press on election day to disavow the crime due to Brazilian election rules.

A 2023 study found that Rede Globo's media coverage on the eve of the election led Lula to lose millions of votes.

1989 Brazilian presidential election debates
No.	Date	Hosts	Moderators	Participants										
Key: P Present A Absent O Invited to other debate N Not invited				PRN	PT	PDT	PSDB	PDS	PL	PMDB	PCB	PFL	PSD	PTB
Key: P Present A Absent O Invited to other debate N Not invited				Collor	Lula	Brizola	Covas	Maluf	Afif	Ulysses	Freire	Chaves	Caiado	Camargo
1	Monday, 17 July 1989	Rede Bandeirantes	Marília Gabriela	A	P	P	P	P	P	A	P	P	P	P
2.1	Monday, 14 August 1989	Rede Bandeirantes	Marília Gabriela	O	O	P	O	P	P	O	P	P	O	O
2.2	Tuesday, 15 August 1989	Rede Bandeirantes	Marília Gabriela	A	P	O	P	O	O	P	O	O	P	P
3	Monday, 16 October 1989	Rede Bandeirantes	Marília Gabriela	A	P	P	P	P	P	A	P	A	P	N
4	Sunday, 5 November 1989	Rede Bandeirantes	Marília Gabriela	A	P	P	P	P	P	A	P	A	P	N
5	Sunday, 12 November 1989	SBT	Boris Casoy	A	P	P	P	P	P	A	P	A	P	N

=== Second round ===
1989 Brazilian presidential election debates
No.	Date	Hosts	Moderators	Participants	
Key: P Present A Absent				PRN	PT
Key: P Present A Absent				Collor	Lula
1	Sunday, 3 December 1989	Rede Manchete	Alexandre Garcia; Boris Casoy; Eliakim Araújo; Marília Gabriela	P	P
2	Thursday, 14 December 1989	Rede Bandeirantes	Alexandre Garcia; Boris Casoy; Eliakim Araújo; Marília Gabriela	P	P

== Opinion polls ==
=== First round ===
Polling aggregates
- Active candidates
- Fernando Collor (PRN)
- Lula (PT)
- Leonel Brizola (PDT)
- Mário Covas (PSDB)
- Paulo Maluf (PDS)
- Afif Domingos (PL)
- Ulysses Guimarães (PMDB)
- Others
- Abstentions/Undecided

Pollster/client(s)	Date(s) conducted	Sample size	Collor PRN	Lula PT	Brizola PDT	Covas PSDB	Maluf PDS	Afif PL	Guimarães PMDB	Others	Abst. Undec.	Lead
1989 election	15 Nov	–	30.48%	17.19%	16.51%	11.52%	8.85%	4.84%	4.74%	5.87%	6.45%	13.29%
Datafolha	15 Nov (Note: Exit poll conducted on election day.)	10,645	30%	18%	14%	10%	8%	4%	4%	–	6%	12%
Datafolha	14 Nov	–	26%	15%	14%	11%	9%	5%	5%	4%	11%	11%
Datafolha	10 Nov	–	27%	15%	14%	11%	9%	5%	4%	5%	10%	12%
Datafolha	6–7 Nov	–	25%	15%	14%	9%	7%	4%	4%	13% (Note: Sílvio Santos (PMB) with 10%)	9%	10%
Datafolha	1–3 Nov	–	21%	14%	13%	9%	7%	4%	4%	17% (Note: Sílvio Santos (PMB) with 14%)	13%	7%
Datafolha	25–26 Oct	5,251	26%	14%	15%	9%	9%	5%	4%	5% (Note: Aureliano Chaves (PFL) with 1%)	13%	11%
Datafolha	18–19 Oct	5,261	26%	14%	15%	8%	9%	7%	3%	5% (Note: Aureliano Chaves (PFL) with 1%)	13%	11%
Datafolha	7–8 Oct	4,893	29%	10%	13%	7%	8%	8%	3%	4%	17%	16%
Datafolha	23–24 Sep	5,057	33%	7%	15%	6%	7%	7%	3%	5%	17%	18%
Datafolha	2–3 Sep	4,981	40%	6%	14%	5%	8%	5%	2%	4%	16%	26%
Datafolha	19–20 Aug	5,079	41%	5%	14%	5%	7%	3%	3%	4%	18%	27%
Datafolha	22–23 Jul	5,156	38%	6%	12%	6%	7%	2%	4%	4%	21%	26%
Datafolha	1–2 Jul	10,212	40%	7%	12%	6%	5%	2%	5%	5% (Note: Aureliano Chaves (PFL) with 2%)	18%	28%
Datafolha	3–4 Jun	10,447	42%	7%	11%	5%	4%	1%	5%	4%	21%	31%
Datafolha	23–24 Apr	10,421	14%	12%	13%	6%	5%	1%	–	24% (Note: Orestes Quércia (PMDB) with 18%; Jânio Quadros with 4%)	21%	4%

=== Second round ===
Polling aggregates
- Active candidates
- Fernando Collor (PRN)
- Lula (PT)
- Abstentions/Undecided

Pollster/client(s)	Date(s) conducted	Sample size	Collor PRN	Lula PT	Abst. Undec.	Lead
1989 election	17 Dec	–	53.03%	46.97%	5.42%	6.06%
Datafolha	17 Dec	11,995	51.5%	48.5%	–	3.0%
Datafolha	16 Dec	11,995	47%	44%	10%	3%
Datafolha	12–13 Dec	5,250	46%	45%	9%	1%
Datafolha	8 Dec	5,250	47%	44%	9%	3%
Datafolha	4 Dec	5,250	49%	41%	10%	9%
Datafolha	30 Nov	5,250	50%	40%	10%	10%
Datafolha	22 Nov	5,716	48%	39%	13%	9%

== Results ==
Fernando Collor received the most votes in most states, except for the Federal District, where Lula came first, and Rio de Janeiro, Santa Catarina and Rio Grande do Sul, won by Leonel Brizola. In the second round, Lula won in Rio Grande do Sul, Rio de Janeiro, the Federal District, and his home state of Pernambuco, whilst Collor carried every other state.

Candidate	Party	First round		Second round	
Candidate	Party	Votes	%	Votes	%
Fernando Collor	National Reconstruction Party	20,611,030	30.48	35,090,206	53.03
Lula da Silva	Workers' Party	11,622,321	17.19	31,075,803	46.97
Leonel Brizola	Democratic Labour Party	11,167,665	16.51		
Mário Covas	Brazilian Social Democracy Party	7,790,381	11.52		
Paulo Maluf	Democratic Social Party	5,986,585	8.85		
Guilherme Afif	Liberal Party	3,272,520	4.84		
Ulysses Guimarães	Party of the Brazilian Democratic Movement	3,204,996	4.74		
Roberto Freire	Brazilian Communist Party	769,117	1.14		
Aureliano Chaves	Party of the Liberal Front	600,821	0.89		
Ronaldo Caiado	Social Democratic Party	488,893	0.72		
Affonso Camargo	Brazilian Labour Party	379,284	0.56		
Enéas Carneiro	Party of the Reconstruction of the National Order	360,578	0.53		
Marronzinho	Social Progressive Party	238,408	0.35		
Paulo Gontijo	People's Party	198,710	0.29		
Zamir Teixeira	National Communitarian Party	187,164	0.28		
Lívia Maria	Nationalist Party	179,925	0.27		
Eudes Mattar	Progressive Liberal Party	162,343	0.24		
Fernando Gabeira	Green Party	125,844	0.19		
Celso Brant	Party of National Mobilization	109,903	0.16		
Antônio Pedreira	Brazilian People's Party	86,107	0.13		
Manoel Horta	Party of the Christian Democracy of Brazil	83,291	0.12		
Armando Corrêa (Note: On 9 November 1989, the Superior Electoral Court revoked the provisional registry of the Brazilian Municipalist Party, for not having held the minimum number of regional conventions required by law. Armando Corrêa was therefore disqualified for the election, and all votes cast for the candidate were annulled.)	Brazilian Municipalist Party	0	0.00		
Total		67,625,886	100.00	66,166,009	100.00
Valid votes		67,625,886	93.55	66,166,009	94.17
Invalid/blank votes		4,664,330	6.45	4,094,692	5.83
Total votes		72,290,216	100.00	70,260,701	100.00
Registered voters/turnout		82,074,718	88.08	82,074,718	85.61
Source: Superior Electoral Court

=== By federative unit ===
==== First round ====
Federative unit	Collor		Lula		Brizola		Covas		Maluf		Afif		Ulysses		Other candidates	
Federative unit	Votes	%	Votes	%	Votes	%	Votes	%	Votes	%	Votes	%	Votes	%	Votes	%
Acre	49,862	38.95%	22,954	17.93%	8,582	6.70%	3,716	2.90%	12,882	10.06%	7,149	5.58%	14,580	11.39%	8,285	6.47%
Alagoas	554,612	64.38%	76,227	8.85%	63,071	7.32%	67,240	7.81%	9,253	1.07%	26,869	3.12%	9,138	1.06%	55,060	6.39%
Amapá	42,255	48.42%	21,026	24.09%	4,935	5.65%	3,695	4.23%	1,960	2.25%	4,323	4.95%	3,883	4.45%	5,194	5.95%
Amazonas	300,848	50.49%	125,406	21.05%	26,129	4.39%	36,380	6.11%	24,832	4.17%	36,544	6.13%	17,303	2.90%	28,427	4.77%
Bahia	1,408,614	34.77%	1,050,444	25.93%	229,186	5.66%	248,803	6.14%	72,200	1.78%	100,970	2.49%	638,007	15.75%	302,851	7.48%
Ceará	861,030	33.09%	321,526	12.36%	505,440	19.43%	477,286	18.34%	108,877	4.18%	60,228	2.31%	85,406	3.28%	182,063	7.00%
Espírito Santo	468,910	39.62%	264,983	22.39%	105,093	8.88%	118,048	9.97%	32,221	2.72%	45,644	3.86%	71,408	6.03%	77,263	6.53%
Federal District	172,818	22.75%	220,720	29.06%	71,719	9.44%	135,227	17.81%	31,364	4.13%	48,068	6.33%	26,167	3.45%	53,397	7.03%
Goiás	803,199	45.39%	298,261	16.86%	70,146	3.96%	101,514	5.74%	80,376	4.54%	111,808	6.32%	157,355	8.89%	146,852	8.30%
Maranhão	609,758	46.93%	255,586	19.67%	116,539	8.97%	44,154	3.40%	35,939	2.77%	54,021	4.16%	72,794	5.60%	110,471	8.50%
Mato Grosso	344,973	46.60%	76,700	10.36%	75,194	10.16%	33,472	4.52%	43,679	5.90%	66,916	9.04%	56,209	7.59%	43,132	5.83%
Mato Grosso do Sul	436,539	53.23%	73,697	8.99%	63,721	7.77%	50,465	6.15%	47,237	5.76%	60,061	7.32%	44,130	5.38%	44.313	5.40%
Minas Gerais	2,801,422	36.12%	1,792,789	23.11%	418,935	5.40%	799,227	10.30%	275,669	3.55%	503,027	6.48%	459,308	5.92%	706,515	9.11%
Pará	793,384	52.01%	294,981	19.34%	52,361	3.43%	101,282	6.64%	62,848	4.12%	65,419	4.29%	66,384	4.35%	88,667	5.81%
Paraíba	457,129	35.16%	313,895	24.14%	186,076	14.31%	94,774	7.29%	33,777	2.60%	25,659	1.97%	97,634	7.51%	91,247	7.02%
Paraná	1,738,216	40.64%	353,907	8.27%	616,170	14.41%	325,652	7.61%	319,932	7.48%	494,608	11.56%	144,687	3.38%	284,052	6.64%
Pernambuco	1,066,986	37.74%	950,189	33.61%	265,548	9.39%	101,093	3.58%	43,518	1.54%	70,093	2.48%	89,991	3.18%	239,410	8.47%
Piauí	383,632	39.75%	219,406	22.73%	93,507	9.69%	48,763	5.05%	38,236	3.96%	36,829	3.82%	61,037	6.32%	83,662	8.67%
Rio de Janeiro	1,189,385	16.07%	904,223	12.22%	3,855,561	52.09%	643,786	8.70%	115,656	1.56%	191,751	2.59%	124,752	1.69%	376,389	5.09%
Rio Grande do Norte	326,878	33.37%	239,010	24.40%	78,259	7.99%	56,768	5.80%	52,546	5.36%	20,846	2.13%	139,093	14.20%	66,084	6.75%
Rio Grande do Sul	480,842	9.23%	350,062	6.72%	3,262,925	62.66%	249,384	4.79%	309,406	5.94%	178,311	3.42%	185,433	3.56%	190,826	3.66%
Rondônia	165,607	42.82%	75,532	19.53%	39,650	10.25%	13,718	3.55%	24,934	6.45%	26,123	6.75%	19,370	5.01%	21,800	5.64%
Roraima	32,130	59.72%	5,417	10.07%	5,092	9.47%	2,944	5.47%	1,377	2.56%	2,252	4.19%	1,589	2.95%	2,996	5.57%
Santa Catarina	566,990	23.52%	255,015	10.58%	632,170	26.22%	177,980	7.38%	236,151	9.79%	206,957	8.58%	242,757	10.07%	93,042	3.86%
São Paulo	4,085,223	24.40%	2,921,970	17.45%	252,651	1.51%	3,802,330	22.71%	3,934,334	23.50%	807,944	4.83%	331,576	1.98%	605,316	3.62%
Sergipe	301,730	50.81%	108,002	18.19%	55,751	9.39%	39,499	6.65%	23,550	3.97%	9,744	1.64%	12,161	2.05%	43,442	7.31%
Tocantins	164,964	57.08%	27,888	9.65%	11,605	4.02%	9,739	3.37%	13,258	4.59%	9,822	3.40%	32,701	11.32%	19,023	6.58%
Abroad	3,094	24.66%	2,505	19.96%	1,649	13.14%	3,442	27.43%	573	4.57%	534	4.26%	143	1.14%	609	4.85%
Source: Superior Electoral Court

==== Second round ====
Federative unit	Collor		Lula	
Federative unit	Votes	%	Votes	%
Acre	89,103	69.18%	39,695	30.82%
Alagoas	683,920	76.07%	215,177	23.93%
Amapá	53,780	64.25%	29,926	35.75%
Amazonas	397,103	66.79%	197,431	33.21%
Bahia	2,118,307	51.68%	1,980,907	48.32%
Ceará	1,478,288	56.91%	1,119,367	43.09%
Espírito Santo	689,981	59.30%	473,597	40.70%
Federal District	268,963	37.32%	451,780	62.68%
Goiás	1,160,446	68.44%	535,142	31.56%
Maranhão	867,188	62.44%	521,753	37.56%
Mato Grosso	475,046	66.39%	240,486	33.61%
Mato Grosso do Sul	579,064	72.85%	215,859	27.15%
Minas Gerais	4,186,658	55.51%	3,355,125	44.49%
Pará	1,105,646	72.49%	419,643	27.51%
Paraíba	740,208	54.97%	606,446	45.03%
Paraná	2,793,218	67.29%	1,357,754	32.71%
Pernambuco	1,455,747	49.10%	1,509,102	50.90%
Piauí	590,594	58.92%	411,814	41.08%
Rio de Janeiro	1,941,499	27.08%	5,227,886	72.92%
Rio Grande do Norte	535,195	52.59%	482,463	47.41%
Rio Grande do Sul	1,532,824	31.28%	3,366,795	68.72%
Rondônia	234,272	63.25%	136,123	36.75%
Roraima	39,916	76.35%	12,364	23.65%
Santa Catarina	1,167,689	50.32%	1,152,730	49.68%
São Paulo	9,270,501	57.90%	6,739,403	42.10%
Sergipe	403,480	65.89%	208,829	34.11%
Tocantins	227,029	78.39%	62,576	21.61%
Abroad	4,541	44.65%	5,630	55.35%
Source: Superior Electoral Court
