= Andrada =

Andrada is a surname, as well as a Romanian feminine given name. Notable people with the surname include:

- Alonso Andrada (1590–1672), biographer and ascetic writer
- Bonifácio de Andrada (1930–2021), Brazilian politician
- Diogo de Paiva de Andrada (1528–1575), Portuguese theologian born at Coimbra
- Doorgal Andrada (born 1992), Brazilian politician
- Edgardo Andrada (1939–2019), retired professional Argentine footballer who played as goalkeeper
- Esteban Andrada (born 1991), Argentine international football goalkeeper
- José Andrada (1948–2025), Argentine actor
- José Bonifácio Lafayette de Andrada (1904–1986), Brazilian lawyer & politician
- Lafayette de Andrada (born 1966), Brazilian politician
- Manuel Andrada (1890-?), Argentine polo player
- Marliece Andrada (born 1972), Playboy's Playmate of the Month in March 1998
- Tobías Andrada (born 2007), Argentine footballer
- Víctor Hugo Andrada (born 1958), former Argentine - Bolivian football midfielder nicknamed "Copito"

Notable people with the given name include:

- Andrada-Maria Moroșanu (born 2002), Romanian rower

== See also ==
- Andrada Polytechnic High School (founded 2012), high school in the Vail Unified School District
- José Bonifácio de Andrada e Silva (1763–1838), Brazilian politician, diplomat and naturalist
