= Doorgal Andrada =

Brazilian politician (born 1992)

Member of the Legislative Assembly of Minas Gerais
- Incumbent
- Assumed office 1 February 2019

Personal details
- Born: 21 October 1992 (age 33)
- Party: Progressistas
- Relatives: Bonifácio de Andrada (grandfather); José Bonifácio Lafayette de Andrada (great-grandfather); Lafayette de Andrada (uncle)

Doorgal Gustavo Sad Lafayette de Andrada (born 21 October 1992) is a Brazilian politician serving as a member of the Legislative Assembly of Minas Gerais since 2019. He has served as chairman of the Constitution and Justice Committee since 2025. He is the grandson of Bonifácio de Andrada, the great-grandson of José Bonifácio Lafayette de Andrada, and the nephew of Lafayette de Andrada.
