= Leda Bisol =

Brazilian linguist

Leda Bisol (December 1, 1924 – July 28, 2025) was a Brazilian linguist known for her research in the area of Brazilian Portuguese phonology.

== Biography ==
Leda Bisol was born in Porto Alegre, Brazil, in 1924. Her brother was the politician and judge José Paulo Bisol.

She began studying in the Federal University of Rio Grande do Sul's teacher training program, graduating in 1954. In 1972, she obtained a master's in linguistics from the National Museum of Brazil at the Federal University of Rio de Janeiro, followed by a doctorate from the same institution in 1981.

Bisol became a prominent linguist in Brazil, helping to shape the field in her country. She was known in particular as an authority on Brazilian Portuguese phonology. Notably, in the 1980s, she initiated the Urban Language Variation in the South of the Country (VARSUL) project, which produced a key Brazilian oral language database.

A longtime professor at the Federal University of Rio Grande do Sul, she later taught at the Pontifical Catholic University of Rio Grande do Sul.

In 2021, Bisol was elected as an honorary member of the Brazilian Linguistics Association. That same year, she was named professor emeritus at the Federal University of Rio Grande do Sul, and in 2025 she became an emeritus researcher at Brazil's National Council for Scientific and Technological Development. She died in 2025 at 100 years old.

== Selected works ==
=== Books ===
- Harmonia vocálica: uma regra variável (doctoral thesis, 1981)
- Introdução a estudos de fonologia do português brasileiro (1996)

=== Articles and chapters ===
- "Harmonização vocálica, uma regra variável" (1987)
- "O ditongo na perspectiva da fonologia atual" (1989)
- "O acento e o pé métrico binário" (1992)
- "Ditongos derivados" (1994)
- "A sílaba e seus constituintes" (1999)
- "O clítico e seu status prosódico" (2000)
- "Neutralização das átonas" (2003)
- "Mattoso Câmara Jr. e a palavra prosódica" (2004)
- "O acento: Duas alternativas de análise" (2013)
