= Lafayette de Andrada =

Brazilian politician (born 1966)

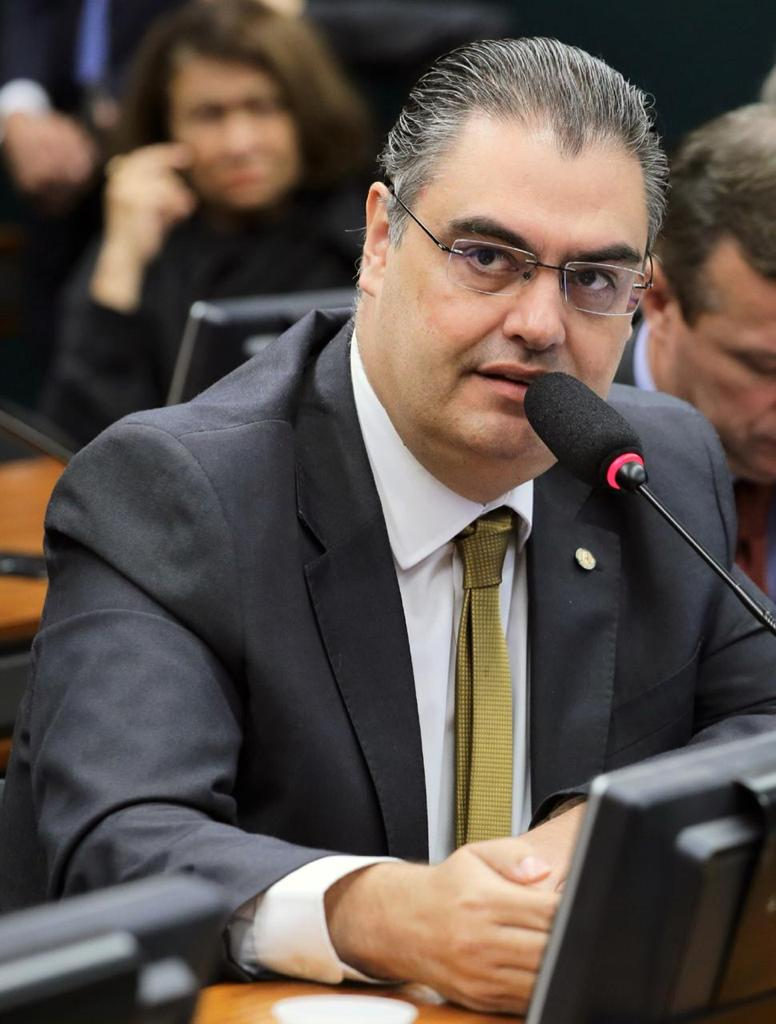
- Andrada in 2020

Member of the Chamber of Deputies
- Incumbent
- Assumed office 1 February 2019
- Constituency: Minas Gerais

Personal details
- Born: 17 October 1966 (age 60)
- Party: Republicans (since 2018)
- Parent: Bonifácio José Tamm de Andrada (father)
- Relatives: José Bonifácio Lafayette de Andrada (grandfather); Doorgal Andrada (nephew)

Lafayette de Andrada (born 17 October 1966) is a Brazilian politician serving as a member of the Chamber of Deputies since 2019. From 2007 to 2019, he was a member of the Legislative Assembly of Minas Gerais.
