= Theodoro Henrique Maurer Júnior =

Brazilian philologist and linguist

- Born: May 13, 1906; Cosmópolis, São Paulo
- Died: 1979 (aged 72–73); São Paulo
- Education: Faculty of Philosophy, Sciences and Languages, University of São Paulo
- Spouse: Maria Branca Vogel
- Scientific career
- Fields: Linguistics, Romance linguistics

Theodoro Henrique Maurer Júnior (May 13, 1906 – 1979) was a Brazilian philologist and linguist known for his work on Romance languages. He received his PhD in Latin from the Faculty of Philosophy, Sciences and Languages of the University of São Paulo in 1944, where he was an active professor from 1947 to 1967. From 1945 to 1946 he received a Rockefeller Foundation grant to study at Yale University, where he did research under linguists such as Leonard Bloomfield, Franklin Edgerton and Edgar Sturtevant.

He was one of the founders of the Brazilian Linguistics Association.

== Biography ==
=== Early years ===
Maurer was born on May 13, 1906, in the Swiss colony "Campos Sales", in Cosmópolis, at that time a rural region of Campinas, São Paulo. His parents, Henrique Maurer and Rosette H. Maurer, were from Zürich and had come to Brazil in 1898. However, Maurer Júnior spent his childhood, until the age of five, in the countryside of the United States, where his family had temporarily moved.

=== Early academic experiences ===
Back in Brazil, they settled in the Rebouças region, now Sumaré, where Maurer lived until he was fifteen. His secondary education was carried out in Campinas, as an autodidact, and, from 1925 to 1928, he attended the Pre-Theological and Theological Courses at the Presbyterian Theological Seminary. He married Maria Branca Vogel on June 24, 1931. They moved to Franca, where Maurer worked as pastor of the Presbyterian Church.

In Franca, he taught English and Latin at the Escola Normal Livre from 1930 to 1934. That year, he took a public exam for the Latin chair at the Campinas State Gymnasium, defending the thesis O Caso Ablativo: estudo sintático (The Ablative case: syntactic study) and obtaining the first place. However, the Gymnasium's Congregation changed the three-name list and, thus, he was not selected. He moved to São Paulo, where he taught high school.

From 1935 to 1937, he taught Latin and Portuguese in the high school at the Mackenzie Presbyterian Institute, and also in 1935, at the Pre-Theology course at the José Manuel da Conceição Institute (where he was a teacher of Isaac Nicolau Salum, his future colleague at the University of São Paulo), in Jandira, he started teaching Portuguese, French, Latin and Greek. From 1935 to 1938 he worked at the Theology Faculty of the Independent Presbyterian Church as a professor of Old and New Testament Exegesis and Biblical archaeology.

=== Higher education and experience at Yale ===
From 1938, he studied Classical Languages and Portuguese at the Faculty of Philosophy, Sciences and Languages (FFCL) of the University of São Paulo, where he graduated in 1940. He continued teaching at the José Manuel da Conceição Institute until 1943 and, from this year to 1945, he taught Greek at Colégio Oswaldo Cruz. From 1944 to 1952, he taught philosophy and logic at the Theology Faculty of the Methodist Church of Brazil. Since his graduation from FFCL, he became Assistant Professor and Professor of Latin (initially also of Greek) at the same college. He got his doctorate, in 1944, with the dissertation A Morfologia e a Sintaxe do Genitivo Latino: estudo histórico (The Morphology and Syntax of the Latin Genitive: a historical study).

The Rockefeller Foundation offered him a fellowship at Yale University, and from 1945 to 1946 he took courses in Indo-European, Sanskrit, and Hittite linguistics at Yale with Leonard Bloomfield, Franklin Edgerton, and Edgard Sturtevant. These studies resulted in two articles in Language: "Unity of the Indo-European Ablaut System: The Dissyllabic Roots" (1947, vol. 23, no. 1) and "The Romance Conjugation in -ēscō (-īscō) -īre: Its Origin in Vulgar Latin" (1951, vol. 27, no. 2).

=== Career at the University of São Paulo ===
In 1949, upon his return from Yale, he was hired as the Chair of Romance Philology at FFCL, where he focused his studies on Romance languages and was also in charge of the Classical Glottology program (which, at his suggestion, was then renamed Indo-European Linguistics). He became a full professor in 1951, with the thesis A Unidade da România Ocidental (The Unity of Western Romance), and, in 1952, he took the Chair Competition with the thesis O Latim Vulgar: Estudo Crítico (Vulgar Latin: A Critical Study), and was approved and appointed Full Professor of Romance Philology.

With such a position, Maurer gave a start to specialized studies in General Linguistics at USP and, when the area was included in the Minimum Curriculum, he also took responsibility for the undergraduate courses, which he did until his retirement. This happened in 1967, but he continued to devote himself to linguistic studies and also to studies on cooperativism and politics.

He died in 1979, in São Paulo.

== Selected works ==
=== Linguistics ===
==== Papers, theses and essays ====
- "Unity of the Indo-European Ablaut System: The Dissyllabic Roots". Language. Vol. 23, No. 1 (Jan.-Mar., 1947), pp. 1–22.
- "A Morfologia e a Sintaxe do Genitivo Latino". São Paulo, 1948 (Boletim nº 55 da Faculdade de Filosofia, Ciências e Letras da USP), 96 p. (PhD Thesis).
- "The Romance Conjugation in -ēscō (-īscō) -īre: Its Origin in Vulgar Latin". Language. Vol. 27, No. 2 (Apr.-Jun., 1951), pp. 136–145.
- "A Unidade da România Ocidental". São Paulo, 1951 (Boletim nº 118 da Faculdade de Filosofia, Ciências e Letras da USP), 232 p. (Full Professor Thesis).
- "Dois Problemas da Língua Portuguesa". São Paulo, 1951 (Boletim nº 128 da Faculdade de Filosofia, Ciências e Letras da USP), 74 p.

==== Books ====
- Gramática do latim vulgar. Rio de Janeiro: Livraria Acadêmica, 1959, 300 p.
- O problema do latim vulgar. Rio de Janeiro: Livraria Acadêmica, 1962, 202 p.
- O Infinito Flexionado Português. São Paulo, Companhia Editora Nacional e Edusp, 1968, XII + 250 p.

=== Other areas ===
- O Cooperativismo: Um Ideal de Solidariedade Humana na Vida Econômica. São Paulo, 1950, 120 p.
- A Democracia Integral. São Paulo, 1960, 84 p.
- O Cooperativismo: Uma Economia Humana. São Paulo, 1966, 330 p.
