= Clearing (geography) =

Permanent removal of forest for change of land use

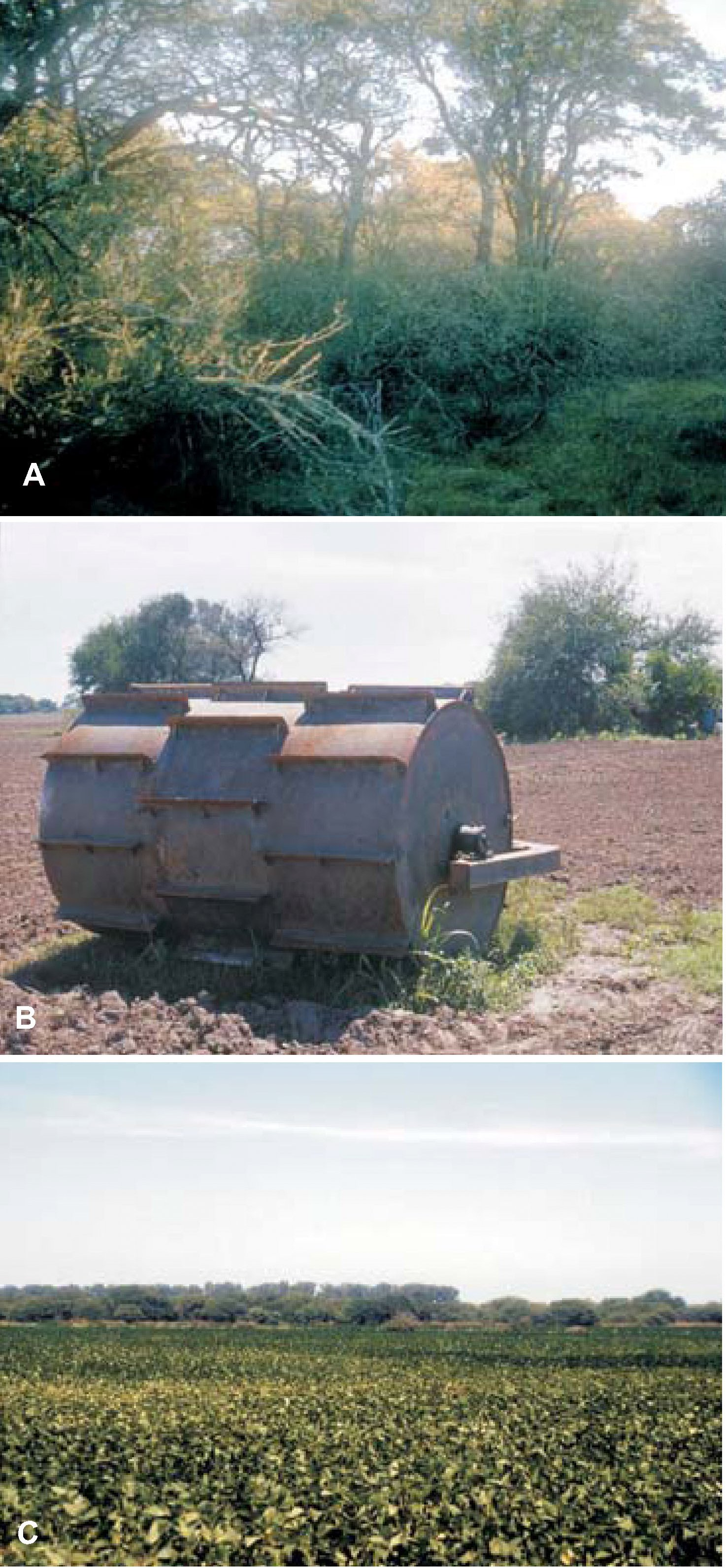
Thorn bushes in the Gran Chaco region of Argentina and Bolivia (A) are cleared and turned into fields (B), in order to be able to plant soya beans (C).

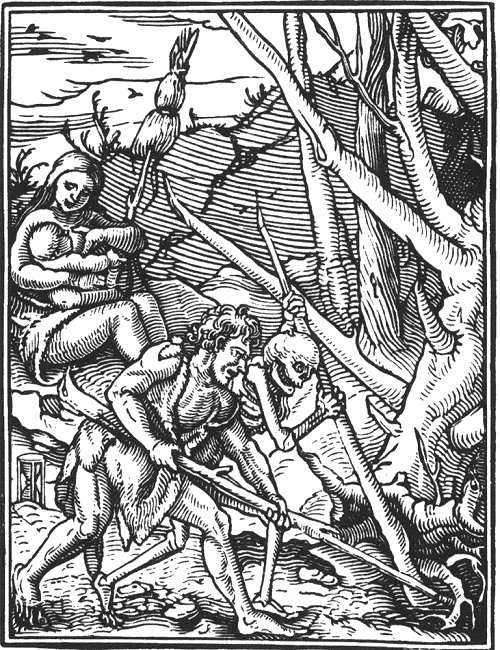
Part of the wood engraving, Totentanz (1538), by Hans Holbein the Younger, showing the clearing of a forest to create farmland.

The clearing of woods and forests is the process by which native vegetation, such as trees and shrubs, together with their roots are permanently removed. The main aim of this process is to clear areas of forest, woodland or scrub in order to develop the area for another purpose, such as pasture, arable farming, human settlement or the construction of roads or railways.

Many of the world's most prominent forests have suffered significant levels of clearing in recent years, including the Amazon. Between 2018 and 2019, 2 years following the presidential election of Jair Bolsonaro, clearing in eastern Brazil increased by 27%.

Between 2015 and 2025, South America recorded the highest annual rate of net forest loss globally, losing 410,110 square kilometres (41.01 million hectares) of forest.

== Description ==
One definition of forest clearing is given in the Austrian federal law that governs the forestry industry which defines it as "the use of forest land for purposes other than forestry".

Sometimes a distinction is made between forest clearing or tree clearing, whereby the trees, including the stumps, are cleared, and stump or root clearing where the trees are first felled and the stumps removed subsequently.

Forest clearings may result in small, isolated, treeless areas or cleared corridors, for example along rivers or other linear features. Isolated clearings frequently occur in advance of more general and large-scale deforestation.

Many towns and villages in Central Europe emerged during historical "clearance periods" resulting in "clearing or clearance landscapes as a form of internal colonisation. An example of this is the settlement of people in the Central Uplands in so-called Waldhufendorf villages. The names of many towns and villages in Europe derives from their origin as clearance settlements, for example, names ending in -rode (Gernrode, Wernigerode) or -reuth (Bayreuth).

Unlike in other areas of the world, clearing in Europe has decreased in recent years. In the 35 years from 1990 to 2025, forested areas in Europe increased by 411,540 square kilometres (41.15 million hectares).

== Methods ==
Clearing processes depend on both vegetation density and the intended future use of the cleared land. Methods can vary from large-scale clearing techniques to small manual ones.

=== Slash-and-burn ===
Slash-and-burn is a clearing technique where vegetation is manually cut down (slashed), then left to dry before being burned. This technique is commonly used for agricultural reasons because the resulting ash from burned organic materials leave behind beneficial nutrients for farming.

=== Mulching ===
Mulching uses heavy machinery with a fast rotating drum fitted with steel teeth mounted to the front of the vehicle to clear vegetation by shredding vegetation into small pieces of organic material.

=== Grubbing ===
Grubbing is the process of removing cut down vegetation and their stumps and roots, as well as any other debris from a clearing site.

== See also ==
- History of the forest in Central Europe
- Deforestation in Indonesia

== Literature ==
- Richard B. Hilf: Der Wald. Wald und Weidwerk in Geschichte und Gegenwart - Erster Teil [reprint]. Aula, Wiebelsheim, 2003, ISBN 3-494-01331-4.
- Hans Hausrath: Geschichte des deutschen Waldbaus. Von seinen Anfängen bis 1850. Schriftenreihe des Instituts für Forstpolitik und Raumordnung der Universität Freiburg. Hochschulverlag, Freiburg im Breisgau, 1982, ISBN 3-8107-6803-0.
- Jens Lüning: Steinzeitliche Bauern in Deutschland. Die Landwirtschaft im Neolithikum, Habelt, Bonn, 2000, ISBN 3-7749-2953-X, Universitätsforschungen zur prähistorischen Archäologie; Vol. 58, pp. 49–52
