= Leila Cordeiro =

Brazilian journalist

- Born: December 5, 1956 (age 69); Salvador, Bahia, Brazil
- Occupation: Journalist
- Spouse: Eliakim Araújo (m. 1984; died 2016)

Leila Cordeiro (born December 5, 1956) is a Brazilian journalist.

== Biography ==
Born in Bahia, Leila began her career on TV Aratu, in Salvador, in 1974. She joined to TV Globo in 1977, acting as a reporter and at the end of 1986, took over the post of Leilane Neubarth at Jornal da Globo, sharing the bench with her husband, Eliakim Araújo, died in 2016.

In May 1989, she took over the presentation of Jornal Hoje, together with Márcia Peltier, but the venture was short-lived and the journalist decided to change the direction of her career. In July 1989, she and her husband left Globo and went to Rede Manchete, presenting Jornal da Manchete. At the invitation of Silvio Santos, the couple moved to São Paulo, in 1993, to be part of the SBT's journalism team; in this station, they presented Aqui Agora and Jornal do SBT (the latter replacing Lilian Witte Fibe, who had left the station). Four years later, in 1997, the couple decided to move to the United States, where they presented Jornal do SBT/CBS Telenotícias for three years.

The journalist is also an artist and has published two books of poetry: "Pedaços de Mim" (Pieces of Me), 1990, and "De Mala e Vida na Mão" (With Suitcase and Life in Hand), 1995.

Together with her husband, she was the inspiration for a humorous picture of the extinct TV Pirata, a TV Globo program: Casal Telejornal, which portrayed the relationship of the so-called "couple 20" of journalism, as they always worked together.

Currently, she lives with her family in the US state of Florida and develops professional activities on the internet, on the websites Conexão América and Direto da Redação, involved with local community TVs.
