= Oscar Noronha Filho =

Brazilian politician and lawyer

National President of the National Mobilization Party
- In office June 1999 – March 2014
- Preceded by: Celso Brant
- Succeeded by: Telma Ribeiro dos Santos

Federal Deputy for Guanabara
- In office April 13, 1964 – January 31, 1967

Personal details
- Born: January 9, 1916 Caxambu, Minas Gerais, Brazil
- Died: Rio de Janeiro, Rio de Janeiro, Brazil
- Party: PMN (1989–2015); PTB (1979–1989); MDB (1965–1979); PTB
- Spouse: Leda Maria de Albuquerque Noronha
- Education: Federal University of Minas Gerais (UFMG)

Military service
- Allegiance: Brazil
- Branch/service: Brazilian Army
- Years of service: 1943–1944
- Commands: Brazilian Expeditionary Force
- Battles/wars: World War II

Oscar Noronha Filho (January 9, 1916 – April 2015) was a Brazilian lawyer, military and politician. He was the Federal Deputy who replaced Leonel Brizola during the first years of the Militar Dictatorship in Brazil.

== Biography ==
During the World War II, he fought in the Brazilian Expedicionary Force (FAB).

In the 1962 Legislative Elections, was unsuccessfully candidate for Federal Deputy for Guanabara. However, due to the 1964 Coup d'état, he took office on April 13, 1964, replacing Leonel Brizola (PTB).

In 1999, Noronha Filho became the president of the National Mobilization Party (PMN) after the exit of Celso Brant (AVANTE).
