= Christian Democracy (Brazil) =

Christian Democracy Democracia Cristã
- Abbreviation: DC
- President: João Caldas
- General Secretary: Rubens Pavão
- Founded: 30 March 1995; 31 years ago
- Registered: 5 August 1997; 29 years ago
- Preceded by: Christian Democratic Party
- Headquarters: Av. Padre Pereira de Andrade, 758, Boaçava, São Paulo
- Think tank: Fundação Democrata Cristã
- Youth wing: Christian Nationalist Youth
- Women's wing: DC Mulher
- Membership (2023): ▼171,465
- Ideology: Christian democracy; Catholic social teaching; Paternalistic conservatism
- Political position: Centre-right
- Regional affiliation: Christian Democrat Organization of America (observer)
- Colors: Azure; Royal blue; Gold
- Slogan: "Commitment to the Family"
- Electoral number: 27
- Chamber of Deputies: 1 / 514
- Legislative Assemblies: 1 / 1,024
- Mayors: 2 / 5,568
- Municipal Chambers: 123 / 58,043

Party flag
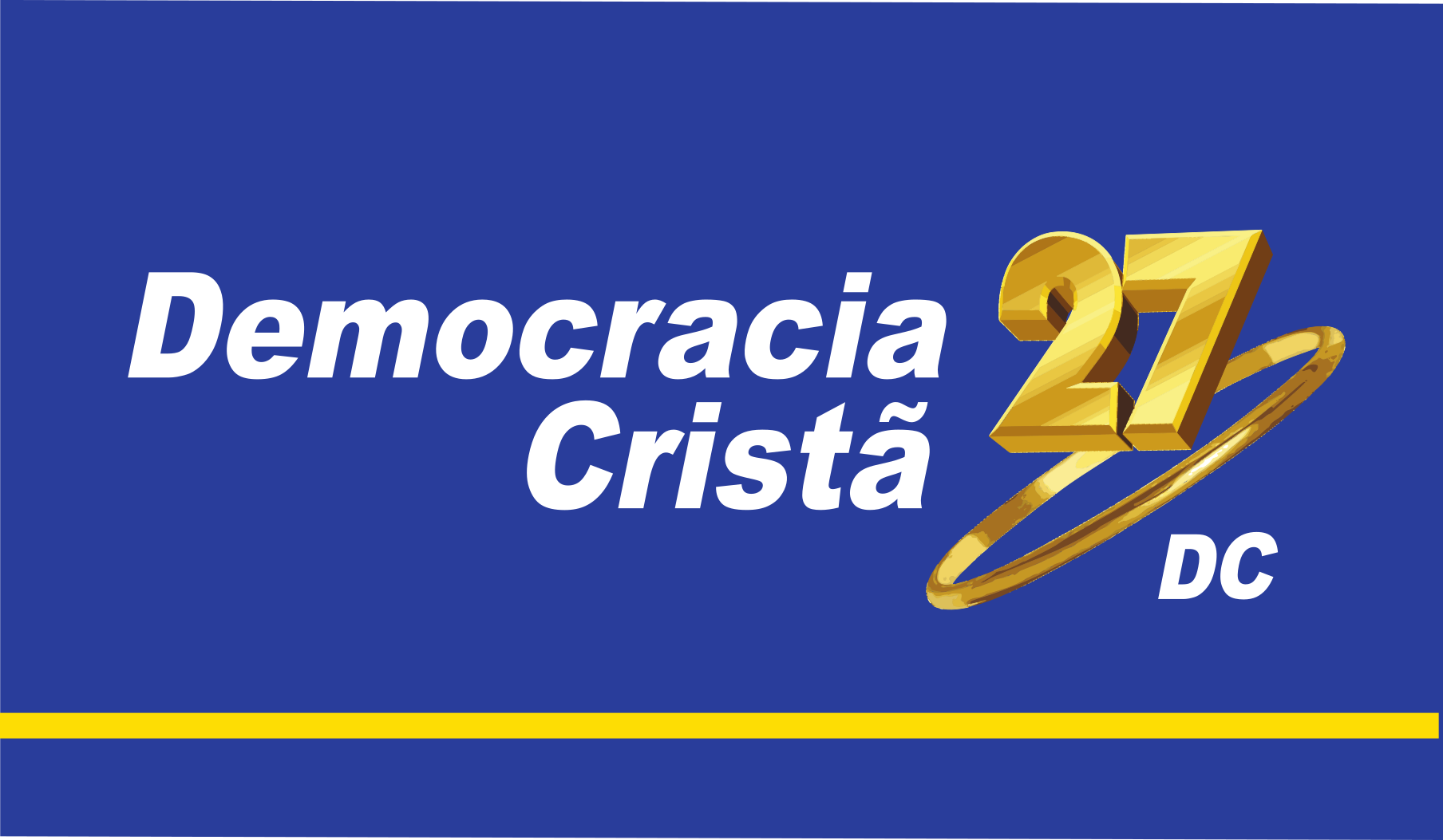

Website
- democraciacrista.org.br

Christian Democracy (Portuguese: Democracia Cristã, DC) is a Christian democratic political party in Brazil. It was founded in 1995 as the Christian Social Democratic Party (Portuguese: Partido Social Democrata Cristão, PSDC), and was officially registered in 1997. The party is presided by João Caldas, which succeeded José Maria Eymael, who has competed the presidential elections six times. In 2017, it changed its name to the current one.

The PSDC was established to be a continuation of the Christian Democratic Party, which had merged with the Democratic Social Party to form the Reform Progressive Party in 1993.

== Election results ==
=== Presidential elections ===
Election	Candidate	Running mate	Colligation	First round		Second round		Result
Election	Candidate	Running mate	Colligation	Votes	%	Votes	%	Result
1998	José Maria Eymael (PSDC)	Josmar Oliveira Alderete (PSDC)	None	171,831	0.25% (#9)	-	-	Lost ✗
2002	None*	None	None	-	-	-	-	-
2006	José Maria Eymael (PSDC)	José Paulo da Silva Neto (PSDC)	None	63,294	0.07% (#6)	-	-	Lost ✗
2010	José Maria Eymael (PSDC)	José Paulo da Silva Neto (PSDC)	None	89,350	0.09% (#5)	-	-	Lost ✗
2014	José Maria Eymael (PSDC)	Roberto Lopes (PSDC)	None	61,250	0.06% (#9)	-	-	Lost ✗
2018	José Maria Eymael (DC)	Hélvio Costa (DC)	None	41,710	0.04% (#12)	-	-	Lost ✗
2022	José Maria Eymael (DC)	João Barbosa Bravo (DC)	None	16,604	0,01 (#11)	-	-	Lost ✗
2026	Clariana Barão (DC)	Fabiana Torquato (DC)	None	39,945	0.03 (#9)	-	-	Lost ✗
Source: Election Resources: Federal Elections in Brazil – Results Lookup *DC supported José Serra (PSDB) and Rita Camata (PMDB) in the second round of 2002 general elections.

=== Legislative elections ===
Election	Chamber of Deputies				Federal Senate				Role in government
Election	Votes	%	Seats	+/–	Votes	%	Seats	+/–	Role in government
1998	62,057	0.09%	0 / 513	New	114,573	0.19%	0 / 81	New	Extra-parliamentary
2002	192,546	0.22%	1 / 513	▲1	29,768	0.03%	0 / 81	0	Independent
2006	354,217	0.38%	0 / 513	▼1	53,025	0.06%	0 / 81	0	Extra-parliamentary
2010	191,835	0.20%	0 / 513	0	73,227	0.04%	0 / 81	0	Extra-parliamentary
2014	509,936	0.52%	2 / 513	▲2	31,011	0.03%	0 / 81	0	Independent
2018	369,386	0.38%	1 / 513	▼1	154,068	0.09%	0 / 81	0	Opposition
2022	138,818	0.13%	0 / 513	▼1	101,722	0.10%	0 / 81	0	Extra-parliamentary
2026	114,402	0.10%	0 / 513	0	189,353	0.09%	0 / 81	0	Extra-parliamentary

Preceded by 25 – DRP (PRD)	Numbers of Brazilian Official Political Parties; 27 – CD (DC)	Succeeded by 28 – BLRP (PRTB)
