= Armando Nogueira =

Brazilian sports journalist

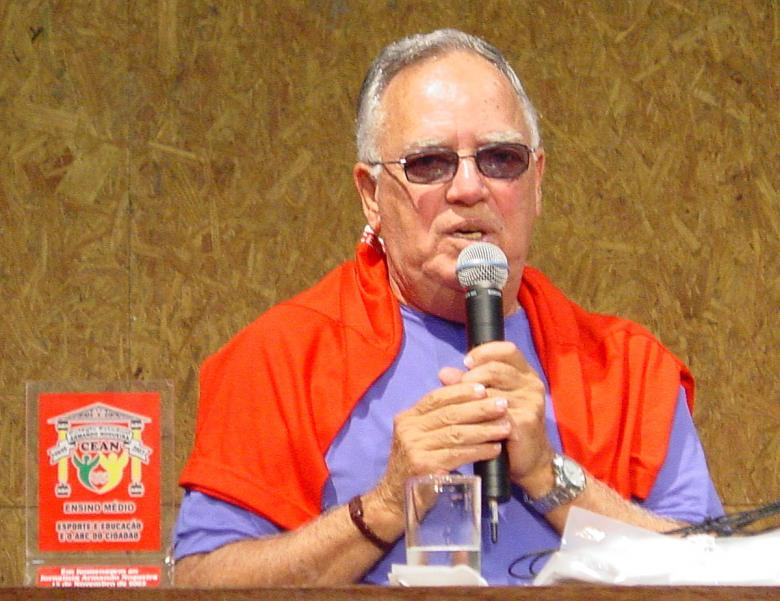
Armando Nogueira

Armando Nogueira (January 27, 1927 – March 29, 2010) was one of the most important Brazilian sports journalists.
