= Party of the Christian Democracy of Brazil =

Party of the Christian Democracy of Brazil Partido da Democracia Cristã do Brasil
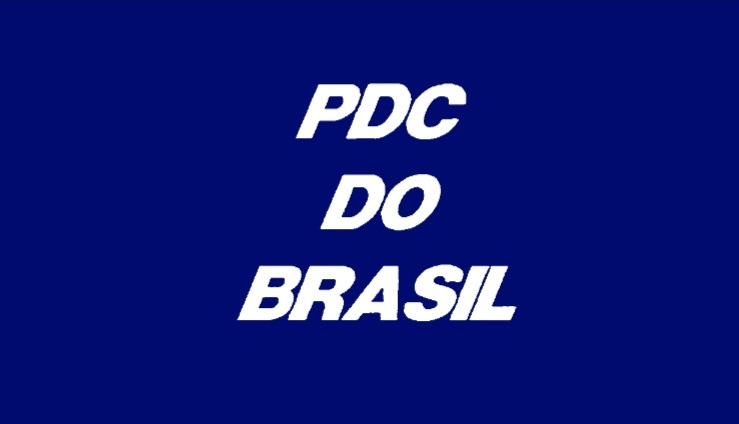
- Abbreviation: PDCdoB (official); PDC do Brasil (unofficial)
- President: Jorge Coelho de Sá
- Secretary-General: Manoel Antonio de Oliveira Horta
- Registered: 1 June 1989 (provisionally)
- Dissolved: 1990

The Party of the Christian Democracy of Brazil (Portuguese: Partido da Democracia Cristã do Brasil, PDCdoB), commonly abbreviated to PDC do Brasil, was a Brazilian political party that participated in the 1989 presidential election with a provisional registration. Its candidate was secretary-general Manoel Antonio de Oliveira Horta, who received 0.1% of the votes in the first round.

In November 1989, members of the party took part in the foundation of the Labour Party of Brazil (PTdoB), now called Avante. In April 1990, the PDC do Brasil, the PTdoB and the Brazilian People's Party had their merger request denied by the Superior Electoral Court, as parties with provisional registration were not allowed to merge.

The registration of the party expired later in 1990.
