= José Paulo Bisol =

Brazilian politician and judge (1928–2021)

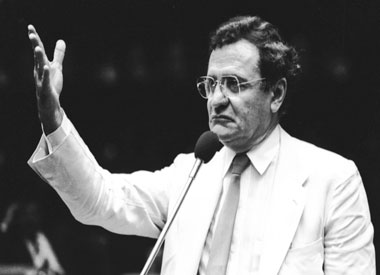

Secretary of Justice and Security of Rio Grande do Sul
- In office 1 January 1999 – 31 December 2002
- Governor: Olívio Dutra
- Preceded by: José Eichenberg
- Succeeded by: José Otávio Germano

Senator for Rio Grande do Sul
- In office 1 February 1987 – 1 February 1995

State Deputy of Rio Grande do Sul
- In office 31 January 1983 – 31 January 1987

Personal details
- Born: 22 October 1928 Porto Alegre, Rio Grande do Sul, Brazil
- Died: 26 June 2021 (aged 92) Porto Alegre, Rio Grande do Sul, Brazil
- Party: PMDB (1980–1987); PSB (1987–2000); PT (2000–2021)
- Education: Pontifical Catholic University of Rio Grande do Sul

José Paulo Bisol (22 October 1928 – 26 June 2021) was a Brazilian politician and judge. Bisol most notably served as the vice presidential running mate of Luiz Inácio Lula da Silva, known as Lula, in the 1989 presidential election. Bisol was originally set to serve as Lula's running mate in the 1994 presidential election, but was replaced by Aloizio Mercadante. Bisol was famous for being an opponent of corruption, and was said to have had a "Mr. Clean" image that was damaged by accusations surrounding his career as a judge during the 1994 campaign.

== Career ==
Throughout his career, Bisol served as a member of the Brazilian Democratic Movement (MDB), the Brazilian Socialist Party (PSB), and the Workers' Party, which he remained a member of. Born in Porto Alegre, Bisol served in a variety of positions representing his home state of Rio Grande do Sul, including as a member of the Senate and the Chamber of Deputies. Additionally, Bisol served as state Secretary of Justice and Security of Rio Grande do Sul.

Later in his career, Bisol emerged as a critic of Lula, accusing him of being a neoliberal. Additionally, Bisol was outspoken against the centre-right presidency of Michel Temer. Bisol was a graduate of the Pontifical Catholic University of Rio Grande do Sul, where he studied law.

== Personal life ==
Bisol suffered from kidney problems, having to endure hemodialysis sessions three times a week as of 2018. He was the brother of prominent Brazilian linguist Leda Bisol, who is primarily known for his contribution to the phonology of Brazilian Portuguese.

== Death ==
Bisol died at 10:26 a.m. on 26 June 2021, at the age of 92. He suffered multiple organ failure at Moinhos de Vento Hospital in Porto Alegre, where he had been admitted to the intensive care unit since 31 May following an acute myocardial infarction; he also had chronic kidney disease, and his condition was worsened by cardiogenic shock. Bisol was survived by his wife, Vera Lúcia Zanette, three children, Tula, Ricardo and Janeiro, nine grandchildren and one great-grandchild. Lula da Silva described Bisol as "the best companion I could have had on that journey", referring to the 1989 campaign, which he called "the most exciting of my life".
