= Eliakim Araújo =

Brazilian journalist

- Born: April 28, 1941; Guaxupé, Minas Gerais, Brazil
- Died: July 17, 2016 (aged 75); Fort Lauderdale, Florida, U.S.
- Occupation: Journalist
- Spouse: Leila Cordeiro (m. 1984–2016)

Eliakim Araújo Pereira Filho, best known as Eliakim Araújo (April 28, 1941 - July 17, 2016), was a Brazilian journalist.

== Biography ==
On July 1, 1961, when he was 20 years old, law student, he was hired as editor of Rádio Continental of Rio de Janeiro. So, his career in journalism was started, as described in an interview given to Jornal da ABI 370 and made available on the blog Dois Pontos. Shortly after, he became editor and presenter of the report Reportagem Ducal. It was in this condition that he announced the resignation of President Jânio Quadros, in August 1961.

After almost twenty years acting on Rádio Jornal do Brasil, of Rio de Janeiro, in 1983, he was invited by TV Globo to present Jornal da Globo, where he stayed until 1989, having also sporadically presented editions of almost all the other newscasts of the station. In 1984, he anchored the Diretas Já rally in Candelária, Rio de Janeiro.

He resigned from Globo and went to Rede Manchete, where he presented, together with another journalist, Leila Cordeiro, with whom he was married from 1984 until his death, the main newscast of the station, Jornal da Manchete.

In 1989, Eliakim represented Rede Manchete in the two presidential debates between Fernando Collor de Mello and Luiz Inácio Lula da Silva, broadcast by a pool of stations that year. It was the first direct election for president of the republic, after the 1964 military coup.

In 1992, invited by Silvio Santos and by the then national director of journalism at SBT, Marcos Wilson, the couple moved to São Paulo, where they initially presented Aqui Agora (from Portuguese: Here Now) and, in 1993, due to the departure of Lillian Witte Fibe from the station, took over Jornal do SBT for more than four years.

In 1997 came the invitation from the American television network CBS to anchor the first international news channel in Portuguese language, CBS Telenotícias, which had a telejournal of the same name (CBS Telenotícias) on SBT. The project lasted three years. Eliakim and Leila then decided to stay in the United States with their children. For three years, he presented Câmera Record News, which aired documentaries from the American program 60 Minutes, on CBS - one of the largest television and radio networks in the United States.

In 2016, Eliakim was diagnosed with pancreatic cancer, and was admitted to a hospital in Fort Lauderdale, where he lived, to treat the disease with chemotherapy. However, a month after the diagnosis, Eliakim died on July 17, aged 75, from complications of the disease.
