= José Maria Eymael =

Brazilian politician (born 1939)

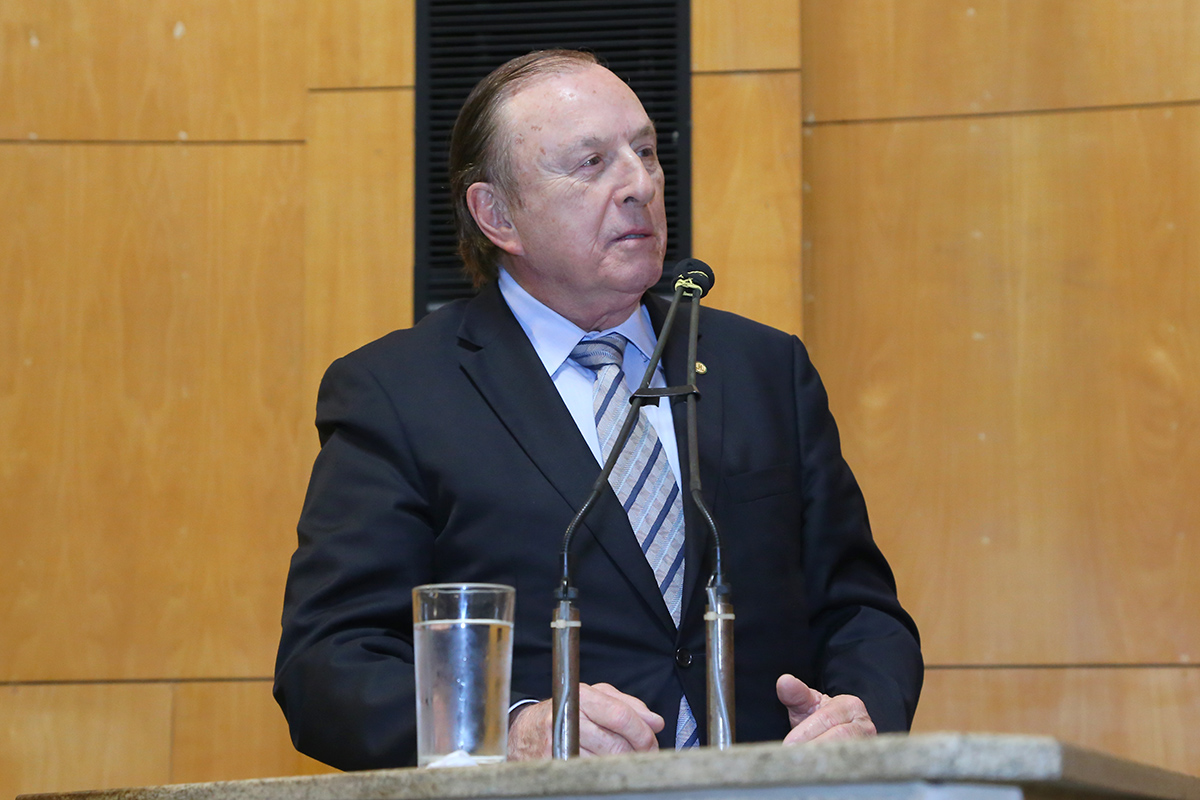
- Eymael in 2018

President of the Christian Democracy
- In office 5 August 1997 – 30 July 2025
- Preceded by: Office established
- Succeeded by: João Caldas

Federal Deputy from São Paulo
- In office 1 February 1986 – 1 February 1995

Personal details
- Born: 2 November 1939 (age 86) Porto Alegre, Rio Grande do Sul, Brazil
- Party: DC (1995–present)
- Other political affiliations: PDC (1962–65); ARENA (1965-80); PDS (1980–82); PTB (1982–85); PDC (1985–93); PPR (1993–95)
- Occupation: Politician

José Maria Eymael (born 2 November 1939) is a Brazilian politician, lawyer, businessman, and founder of the Democracia Cristã (DC), known in English as the Christian Democracy.

Eymael was a candidate for president in 1998, 2006, 2010, 2014, 2018 and 2022, being a perennial candidate.

== Political biography ==
Eymael joined the Christian Democratic Party (PDC) in 1962, in Porto Alegre, becoming a member of the Young Christian Democrats. The PDC was extinguished by the Institutional Act number two on 27 October 1965, during Brazil's military dictatorship, and was refounded in 1985. Eymael was responsible for its reorganization in the state of São Paulo.

In 1985 Eymael was a candidate for mayor of São Paulo, but lost the election. However, the PDC's campaign jingle, with the chorus "Ey Ey Eymael", helped make him popular, and has been associated with him throughout his political career.

In 1986 and again in 1990, he was elected to the Chamber of Deputies, the lower house of the National Congress of Brazil. He ran again for mayor of São Paulo in 1992 but lost once again.

In 1993 the PDC merged with the Democratic Social Party (Partido Democrático Social, PDS), forming the Reform Progressive Party (Partido Progressista Reformador, PPR). Eymael opposed the merge and left the PPR. In 1995, he founded the PSDC, professing a commitment to familiar and religious values.

=== Accomplishments as a member of the Representative Body ===
Congressman Eymael was rated by the Interunionist Department of Parliamentary Advising (Departamento Intersindical de Assessoria Parlamentar, DIAP) as one of the twelve most influential lawmakers in Congress and finishing his work at the Constituent National Assembly he had 145 proposals approved, placing him among the fifteen with the highest number. Among these proposals, there are the following:

- Advance notice of 30 days for all workers;
- Workweek of 44 hours;
- Employee's right to leisure;
- Prohibition of the existence of tax for purposes of confiscation;
- Requirement for taxpayers in the same situation have the same tax treatment;
- Admissibility of an injunction also against acts by any corporation in the exercise of public functions;
- Chance of GST be lower for most needed products, such as the products that comprise the market basket;
- Article 180 of the Constitution, which obliges the Union, states and municipalities to support and encourage tourism as a factor in economic and social development;
- Article 17 of the Temporary Constitutional Provisions Act, which states that whenever a public official to receive compensation or retirement incomes exceed the constitutional limits, these values must be lowered immediately to those limits, not fitting in this case, invocation of rights acquired;
- Obligatoriness of unions, states and municipalities to publish until the 30th of each month the amounts collected or received in that month, thus enabling the society's control over public revenue;
- Duty of adult children caring for parents in aging conditions, narrow circumstances or sickness (Article 229 of the Constitution);

While in the National Constituent Assembly, Eymael was also the author of the speech advocating the retention of the name of God in the preamble of the Constitution, opposing its proposed removal.

=== Presidential candidacies ===
Eymael was a candidate for president in 1998, 2006, 2010, 2014, 2018 and 2022 traveling in each campaign through every Brazilian state. In the 2010 election, Eymael gathered 89,350 votes, placing fifth.

== Life outside politics ==
Jose Maria Eymael is a lawyer specializing in Tax Law and an entrepreneur in the areas of marketing and communications. He is married, and has two children and five grandchildren.

Party political offices
New political party	National President of DC; 1997–present	Incumbent
New political party	DC nominee for President of Brazil; 1998, 2006, 2010, 2014, 2018, 2022	Succeeded by Clariana Barão
