= Sérgio Arouca =

Brazilian politician (1941–2003)

Antônio Sérgio da Silva Arouca (20 August 1941 — 2 August 2003) was a Brazilian public health physician and politician. He served as federal deputy for Rio de Janeiro from 1991 to 1999 by PCB and PPS.

In the 1989 presidential election, he ran for the Vice Presidency of Brazil on Roberto Freire's ticket by the Brazilian Communist Party (PCB), with no success.

== Personal life ==
He was born in Ribeirão Preto, São Paulo, on 20 August 1941. In 1966, he graduated in the Ribeirão Preto Medical School.
