= Brazilian Linguistics Association =

The Brazilian Linguistics Association (abbreviated as "ABRALIN" from the Brazilian Portuguese Associação Brasileira de Lingüística) is an organization intended to bring together professionals in the field of linguistics in order to promote, develop, and disseminate information about theoretical and applied linguistics to students and interested community members in Brazil. The organization hosts scientific conferences, courses, and publications.

The association was founded on January 9, 1969, in an assembly presided over by Professor Joaquim Mattoso Câmara Júnior, in São Paulo.

The first administration (1969–1971) consisted of the following people:

President: Aryon Dall'Igna Rodrigues (Museu Nacional-RJ)
Secretary: Francisco Gomes de Matos (UFPE)
Treasurer: Maria Marta Coelho (UFRJ)
Advisors:

Ataliba Teixeira de Castilho (FFCL-Marília/SP)
Geraldo Calábria Lapenda (UFPE)
Isaac Nicolau Salum (USP)
Joaquim Mattoso Câmara Júnior (UFRJ)
Jürn Philipson (USP)
Nelson Rossi (UFBA)

Today, the ABRALIN headquarters is located at Universidade Estadual de Campinas (UNICAMP)

== Presidents ==
Period	Name	Institution
1969–1971	Aryon Dall'Igna Rodrigues	Museu Nacional - RJ
1973–1975	Ângela Vaz Leão	UFMG
1975–1977	Nelson Rossi	UFBA
1977–1979	Carlos Franchi	UNICAMP
1979–1981	Yonne de Freitas Leite	Museu Nacional - RJ
1981–1983	Francisco Cardoso Gomes de Matos	UFPE
1983–1985	Ataliba Teixeira de Castilho	UNICAMP
1985–1987	Carlos Alberto Faraco	UFPR
1987–1989	Miriam Lemle	UFRJ
1989–1991	Maria Bernadete Marques Abaurre	UNICAMP
1991–1993	Diana Luz Pessoa de Barros	USP
1993–1995	Suzana Alice Marcelino da Silva Cardoso	UFBA
1995–1997	Maria Denilda Moura	UFAL
1997–1999	Leonor Scliar-Cabral	UFSC
1999–2001	Maria Elias Soares	UFCE
2001–2003	Maria Cecília de Magalhães Mollica	UFRJ
2003–2005	Lúcia Maria Pinheiro Lobato	UNB
2005–2007	Thaïs Cristófaro Silva	UFMG
2007–2009	Dermeval da Hora	UFPB
2009-2011	Maria José Foltran	UFPR
2011-2013	Luiz Passeggi	UFRN
2013-2015	Marília Ferreira	UFPA
2015-2017	Mariângela Rios de Oliveira	UFF
2017-2019	Miguel Oliveira Jr.	UFAL
