= Celso Brant =

Brazilian politician (1920–2004)

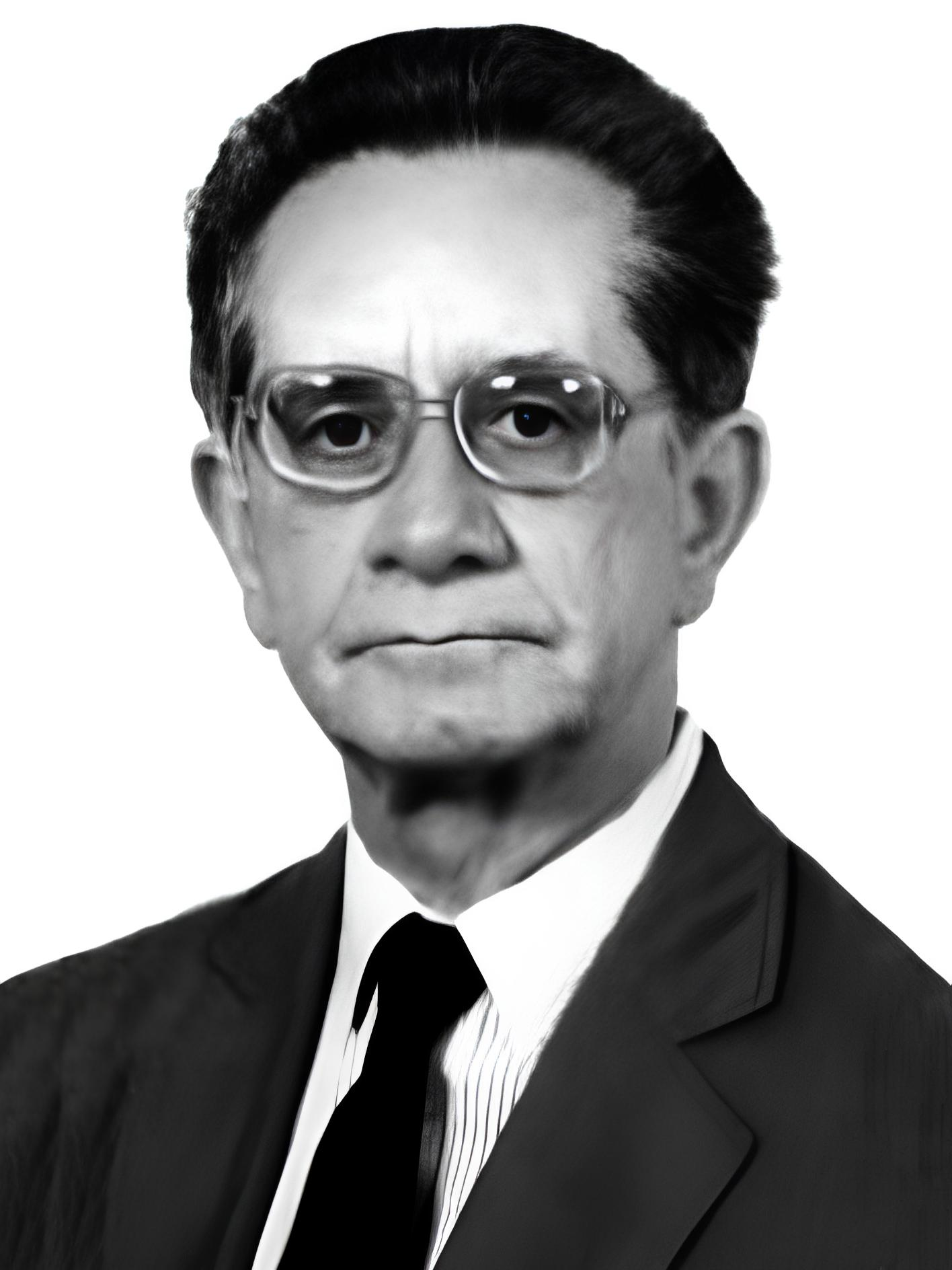

National President of the National Mobilization Party
- In office April 21, 1984 – June 1999
- Preceded by: Position established
- Succeeded by: Oscar Noronha Filho

Alderman of Belo Horizonte
- In office 1 January 1993 – 31 December 1996

Federal Deputy for Minas Gerais
- In office 1 February 1959 – 31 December 1963

Minister of Education Acting
- In office 30 April 1956 – 3 October 1956
- President: Juscelino Kubitschek
- Preceded by: Clóvis Salgado
- Succeeded by: Nereu Ramos

Personal details
- Born: 16 December 1920 Diamantina, Minas Gerais, Brazil
- Died: 24 April 2004 (aged 83) Belo Horizonte, Minas Gerais, Brazil
- Party: PTdoB (1999–2004)
- Other political affiliations: PMN (1985–1999); PTB (1981–1985); PR (1954–1964)

Celso Teixeira Brant (December 16, 1920 - April 24, 2004) was a Brazilian jurist, university professor of the Federal University of Minas Gerais (UFMG), writer and politician. He was the National Mobilization Party (PMN) candidate for President of Brazil in the 1989 General Election.

== Biography ==
For being Clóvis Salgado's cabinet chief, he became the acting Minister of Education between April and October 1956.

In the 1958 Legislative Elections he was elected Federal Deputy from Minas Gerais by the Republican Party (PR), adhering to the National Parliamentary Group.

Brant was nominated and ran for President of Brazil in the 1989 General Election by National Mobilization Party (PMN), receiving 109,909 votes or 0,16% of the valid votes. In the 1992 Municipal Elections he was elected Alderman of Belo Horizonte also by the PMN.
