= Affonso Camargo Neto =

Brazilian civil engineer and politician

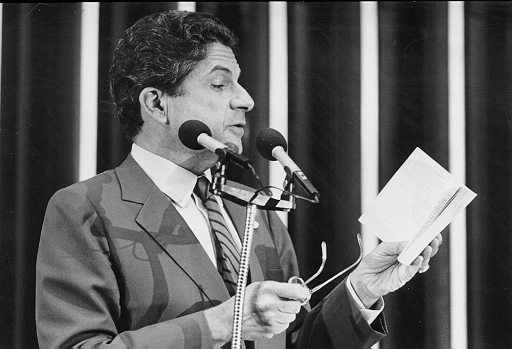
Affonso Camargo Netto in an undated photo

Affonso Alves de Camargo Netto (April 30, 1929 – March 24, 2011) was a Brazilian civil engineer and politician. He was the son of Pedro Alípio Alves de Camargo and Ismênia Marçallo de Camargo, grandson of the former governor of Paraná and descendant of the founder of Curitiba, bandeirante Baltasar Carrasco dos Reis.

He was vice governor of the state of Paraná, senator by the same state, besides federal deputy, elected in 1995, representing Paraná.

Camargo Netto was a candidate for president in 1989. His paternal family, formed by cattle ranchers and owners of refrigerators, had provided political pictures to the former Parana Republican Party. His grandfather, Affonso Alves de Camargo, was a state deputy for four terms (1898–1914), federal deputy (1921–1922), senator (1922–1927), and president of the State of Paraná twice (1916–1920) and 1928–1930) during the Old Republic. It occupied this last position when the outbreak of Revolution of 1930.

Affonso Camargo Netto was married to Gina Flores de Camargo, daughter of Fernando Flores, constituent of 1946 and federal deputy for Paraná between 1946 and 1955, with whom she had five children, of whom two adopted. He married for the second time in March 1994 with Nadir de Santa Maria de Camargo, with whom he had a son.

== Biography ==
Civil Engineer graduated from the Federal University of Paraná in 1952, worked in the private initiative until approaching the then governor Ney Braga who named him successively director of the Department of Water and Electric Energy of Paraná and Secretary of Justice being elected deputy governor in 1964. Political opponent of Paulo Pimentel, changed the old Democratic Christian Party by the Brazilian Democratic Movement after the institution of bipartisanship by the military dictatorship in Brazil (1964–1985). Such political option made him break with Ney Braga being by this one derelict in the dispute to the Senate in 1966.

Later, Ney Braga and Paulo Pimentel broke up politically, and Afonso Camargo recomposed his alliance with his former political godfather, a fact that led him to the presidency of the State Bank of Paraná and to be Secretary of Finance (1973–1974). Elected president of the regional directory of the ARENA in 1975 was indicated [bionic position] in 1978. With the return of the multi-party system it followed towards the PP led by Tancredo Neves, whom he followed when he joined the PMDB. Secretary General of the party, was indicated in 1985 after the election of Tancredo Neves to the Presidency of the Republic and with the death of this one was kept in the portfolio by Jose Sarney. In this period, he created the vale-transporte and thus became known by the nickname of "the father of the transport valley". After leaving the government was reelected senator in 1986.

Afonso Camargo left the PMDB in the first year of his new term and was candidate to the presidency of the Republic in 1989, without passing the first shift. In the next round he supported the candidacy of Fernando Collor, whom he served again as Minister of Transport during the last months of his administration when he also held the Communications portfolio. He was elected federal deputy in 1994, 1998, 2002 and 2006 and during that period he was affiliated with the PPR and the Liberal Front Party before joining PSDB in 2001.

=== Party Activities ===
- Secretary of the PDC National Directory
- President of the Arena Regional Directory (1975)
- Vice-President of the Executive Committee of the PP (1979)
- Deputy Leader of the PP in the Federal Senate (1979)
- Secretary General of the PMDB
- Deputy Leader of the PSDB (May May 2, 3, 2006)

=== Professional Activities and Public Positions ===
- Director of Real Estate Development Company
- Director of the Department of Water and Electric Power of Paraná (1961)
- Founding President of the [Paraná Development Company] (CODEPAR), in Curitiba (1962)
- Secretary of the Interior and Justice of the State of Paraná (1963)
- President (1973) and Secretary of Finance (1974) of the Bank of the State of Paraná
- Secretary of the Treasury of the State of Paraná (1974)
- Minister of State for Transport (1985–1986)
- Minister of State for Transport and Communications (1992)

=== Studies and Courses ===
- Graduated in Civil Engineering from Federal University of Paraná in 1952
- Graduated in Accounting Sciences from Federal University of Paraná in 1951
- Course of Design of Machines by the Federal Technical School of Paraná (1946–1947)
- Course on Transactional Analysis and Management by Objectives (1974)
