= Bonifácio de Andrada =

Brazilian politician (1930–2021)

Bonifácio José Tamm de Andrada
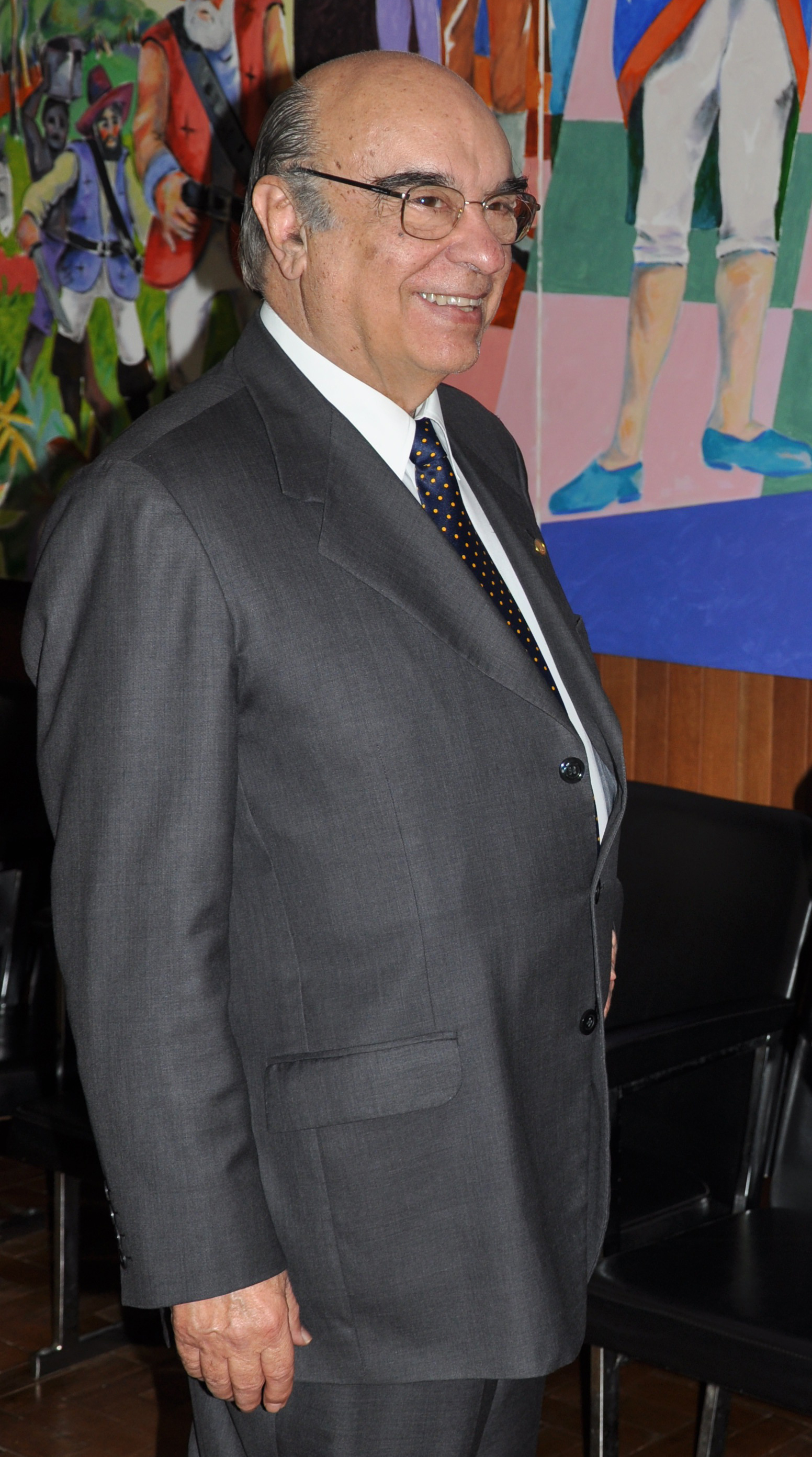
- Tamm de Andrada in October 2011

Federal Deputy for Minas Gerais
- In office 1 February 1979 – 31 January 2019

State Deputy of Minas Gerais
- In office 1959–1975

Personal details
- Born: 14 May 1930 Barbacena, Minas Gerais, Brazil
- Died: 5 January 2021 (aged 90) Belo Horizonte, Minas Gerais, Brazil
- Party: National Democratic Union (1950–1965); National Renewal Alliance (1966–1979); Democratic Social Party (1980–1993); Brazilian Labour Party (1994–1996); Brazilian Social Democracy Party (1997–2017); Democrats (2018–2021)

Bonifácio José Tamm de Andrada (14 May 1930 – 5 January 2021) was a Brazilian politician affiliated to Democrats (DEM), law academic, university professor, political scientist and journalist.

Born in Barbacena, Minas Gerais, he was a member of several political parties throughout his career.

Previously, he was councillor for Barbacena, from 1954 to 1958, and state deputy in Minas Gerais, from 1959 to 1975, having thus held legislative positions for sixty years. He was also a candidate for Vice President of the Republic in the 1989 elections, joining Paulo Maluf's ticket.

From 1979 to 2019, he was a member of the Chamber of Deputies, having served ten consecutive terms.

== Political career ==
Bonifácio was one of the founders of the National Campaign for Free Educandários – (CNEC) in the 1950s and graduated in Law from the Pontifical Catholic University of Rio de Janeiro after having completed the first years of the course at Faculdade Mineira de Direito. After graduating, he started private law in his hometown, where he was elected councilor for a term (1954 to 1958) by the UDN. He was a state deputy in Minas Gerais for four consecutive terms (1959–1975), for the UDN in the first two and for ARENA in the others.

He was a federal deputy for Minas Gerais for the tenth consecutive term (since 1979), elected by the National Renovating Alliance (ARENA) in his first term, by the Social Democratic Party (PDS) in the following 3, by the Brazilian Labour Party (PTB) in the 1994 elections. and the Brazilian Social Democracy Party (PSDB) since then.

Andrada founded in Barbacena, together with his father, the weekly Correio da Serra in 1954, a staunch opposition newspaper of the "udenist" line of which he was editor-in-chief for many years. He was affiliated to the UDN (1954–1965) – for which he was elected councilor and state deputy, when he defended, among other topics, the parliamentary regime (on which, even, he has published works), ARENA (1966–1979), PDS (1980–1993), PTB (1994–1996) and PSDB (since 1997).

He was absent on the vote of Dante de Oliveira Amendment in 1984 that proposed Direct Elections for the Presidency of the Republic, in which twenty-two votes were missing for the amendment to be approved. He was a member of the National Assembly that drafted the 1988 Constitution.

As a state deputy, Andrada chaired the Legislative Assembly of Minas Gerais in 1968. And as a federal deputy, he chaired the Constitution and Justice Commission of the Chamber of Deputies in Brasília. Until the beginning of January 2021, he was the oldest federal deputy in Brazil. He was a candidate for vice-president of the Republic of Brazil in the 1989 presidential election in Paulo Maluf's plate, with this plate obtaining 5,986,575 votes, placing fifth, behind the winner Fernando Collor de Mello, by Luiz Inácio Lula da Silva, by Leonel Brizola and Mário Covas, and defeating known names like Ulysses Guimarães, Aureliano Chaves and Enéas Carneiro. He was elected federal deputy in 2014, for the 55th legislature (2015–2019), by the PSDB. He voted in favor of Dilma Rousseff's impeachment process. In the Michel Temer government, he voted in favor of the PEC on the Ceiling of Public Spending.

In August 2017, Andrada voted against the lawsuit in which he was asked to open an investigation by then President Michel Temer, helping to file the complaint of the Federal Public Ministry. In September 2017, he was chosen by the Constitution and Justice Commission (CCJ) to be the rapporteur of the second complaint against the President of the Republic Michel Temer for the crimes of obstruction to Justice and criminal organization. On 10 October, he recommended that the complaint be rejected by the CCJ.

== Public positions ==
Andrada began his public life as a cabinet officer for the Minister of Agriculture (1955) in the Eurico Gaspar Dutra government. After having served several elective terms, he was appointed Secretary of State for Education and Culture of Minas Gerais (1965) under the then governor Magalhães Pinto. Later, he would occupy the Minas Gerais State Secretariat of Interior and Justice (1974–1977) during the Aureliano Chaves government. And after successive federal parliamentary terms, he was invited during the government by Hélio Garcia to be once again the head of state secretariat – now the secretary of Administration and Human Resources (1994–1997).

== Personal life ==
Andrada is the son of José Bonifácio Lafayette de Andrada and Vera Raymunda Tamm de Andrada, and brother of the late deputy José Bonifácio Tamm de Andrada. He is also a descendant of statesman José Bonifácio de Andrada e Silva – brother of his great-great-grandfather, Martim Francisco Ribeiro de Andrada, married to the daughter of the independence patriarch.

He was married to Amália Borges de Andrada and left 8 children, including politicians like Antônio Carlos Doorgal de Andrada and Lafayette Luiz Doorgal de Andrada, the former attorney general of the Union and deputy attorney general of the Republic José Bonifácio Borges de Andrada, and the judge of the TJMG Doorgal Gustavo Borges de Andrada. He was Roman Catholic.

Andrada died from COVID-19 complications on 5 January 2021, aged 90, at the Mater Dei hospital in Belo Horizonte during the COVID-19 pandemic in Brazil.

== Published works ==
- Ideias e propostas para um Brasil livre;
- Seminário Minas e a Constituição;
- Parlamentarismo e a evolução brasileira: breve ensaio sobre o parlamentarismo, presidencialismo e a evolução política brasileira (1962);
- A educação e segurança nacional (1966);
- Os poderes da Assembleia Nacional Constituinte;
- Migrações sazonais no Nordeste: relatório de pesquisa (1981);
- Constituição, regime democrático e revisão constitucional (1993);
- Parlamentarismo e a realidade nacional (1993);
- A revolução de 1930: marco histórico (1995);
- Ciência política, ciência do poder (1998)

== Tributes and decorations ==
During his career, Bonifácio Andrada has received honors and decorations. Among them, the following stand out:

- Medal of Inconfidência, government of Minas Gerais (1966);
- Medal Santos Dumont, government of Minas Gerais (1968);
- Medal Santos Dumont, from the FAB (1969);
- Medal Alferes Tiradentes, Military Police of Minas Gerais (1977);
- Baron of Rio Branco Order of Merit (1980);
- Legislative Merit of Minas Gerais (1982);
- Merit of the Chilean government;
- Merit of the Superior Labor Court;
- Army Military Merit Medal;
- Military Merit of the Navy;
- Military Merit of Aeronautics

== See also ==
- José Bonifácio de Andrada
