= José Bonifácio Lafayette de Andrada =

Brazilian lawyer & politician (1904–1986)

Lafayette de Andrada

President of the Chamber of Deputies
- In office February 2, 1968 – March 31, 1970
- Preceded by: João Batista Ramos
- Succeeded by: Geraldo Freire

Federal Deputy from Minas Gerais
- In office 1946–1979

State Deputy of Minas Gerais
- In office 1934–1937

Mayor of Barbacena
- In office 1931–1934

Personal details
- Born: José Bonifácio Lafayette de Andrada; May 1, 1904 Barbacena, Minas Gerais, Brazil
- Died: February 18, 1986 (aged 81) Belo Horizonte, Minas Gerais, Brazil
- Party: UDN (1945–65); ARENA (1965–79)
- Education: Federal University of Rio de Janeiro
- Profession: Lawyer, politician

Jose Bonifacio Lafayette de Andrada (Barbacena, May 1, 1904 – Belo Horizonte, February 18, 1986) was a Brazilian lawyer and politician signing the "Manifesto dos Mineiros", constituent state in 1935 and a member of the National Constituent Assembly of 1946, Congressman eight federal mandates and President of the Chamber of Deputies (1968–1970).

Political offices
Preceded by João Batista Ramos	President of the Chamber of Deputies; 1968–1970	Succeeded by Geraldo Freire
